= List of teams and cyclists in the 2002 Giro d'Italia =

The 2002 Giro d'Italia was the 85th edition of the Giro d'Italia, one of cycling's Grand Tours. The field consisted of 198 riders, and 140 riders finished the race.

== By rider ==
Legend
| No. | Starting number worn by the rider during the Giro |
| Pos. | Position in the general classification |
| DNF | Denotes a rider who did not finish |

| No. | Name | Nationality | Team | Pos. | Ref |
|---|---|---|---|---|---|
| 1 | Gilberto Simoni | Italy | Saeco–Longoni Sport | DNF | |
| 2 | Igor Astarloa | Spain | Saeco–Longoni Sport | 53 | |
| 3 | Oscar Mason | Italy | Saeco–Longoni Sport | 56 | |
| 4 | Biagio Conte | Italy | Saeco–Longoni Sport | 101 | |
| 5 | Alessio Galletti | Italy | Saeco–Longoni Sport | 117 | |
| 6 | Igor Pugaci | Moldova | Saeco–Longoni Sport | 40 | |
| 7 | Marius Sabaliauskas | Lithuania | Saeco–Longoni Sport | DNF | |
| 8 | Fabio Sacchi | Italy | Saeco–Longoni Sport | 58 | |
| 9 | Alessandro Spezialetti | Italy | Saeco–Longoni Sport | 48 | |
| 11 | Mario Cipollini | Italy | Acqua & Sapone–Cantina Tollo | 100 | |
| 12 | Roberto Conti | Italy | Acqua & Sapone–Cantina Tollo | 79 | |
| 13 | Martin Derganc | Slovenia | Acqua & Sapone–Cantina Tollo | 95 | |
| 14 | Cristian Gasperoni | Italy | Acqua & Sapone–Cantina Tollo | 131 | |
| 15 | Gabriele Colombo | Italy | Acqua & Sapone–Cantina Tollo | 130 | |
| 16 | Giovanni Lombardi | Italy | Acqua & Sapone–Cantina Tollo | 87 | |
| 17 | Michele Scarponi | Italy | Acqua & Sapone–Cantina Tollo | 18 | |
| 18 | Mario Scirea | Italy | Acqua & Sapone–Cantina Tollo | 109 | |
| 19 | Guido Trenti | United States | Acqua & Sapone–Cantina Tollo | 125 | |
| 21 | Alessandro Bertolini | Italy | Alessio | 83 | |
| 22 | Pietro Caucchioli | Italy | Alessio | 3 | |
| 23 | Daniele De Paoli | Italy | Alessio | 32 | |
| 24 | Angelo Furlan | Italy | Alessio | 128 | |
| 25 | Ivan Gotti | Italy | Alessio | 13 | |
| 26 | Cristian Moreni | Italy | Alessio | 28 | |
| 27 | Vladimir Miholjević | Croatia | Alessio | 35 | |
| 28 | Franco Pellizotti | Italy | Alessio | 16 | |
| 29 | Mauro Zanetti | Italy | Alessio | DNF | |
| 31 | Graeme Brown | Australia | Ceramiche Panaria–Fiordo | DNF | |
| 32 | Julio Alberto Pérez | Mexico | Ceramiche Panaria–Fiordo | 19 | |
| 33 | Faat Zakirov | Russia | Ceramiche Panaria–Fiordo | DNF | |
| 34 | Sergiy Matveyev | Ukraine | Ceramiche Panaria–Fiordo | DNF | |
| 35 | Vladimir Duma | Ukraine | Ceramiche Panaria–Fiordo | 36 | |
| 36 | Nicola Chesini | Italy | Ceramiche Panaria–Fiordo | DNF | |
| 37 | Filippo Perfetto | Italy | Ceramiche Panaria–Fiordo | DNF | |
| 38 | Yauheni Seniushkin | Belarus | Ceramiche Panaria–Fiordo | 126 | |
| 39 | Enrico Degano | Italy | Ceramiche Panaria–Fiordo | 138 | |
| 41 | Fredy González | Colombia | Colombia–Selle Italia | DNF | |
| 42 | Carlos Alberto Contreras | Colombia | Colombia–Selle Italia | DNF | |
| 43 | José Castelblanco | Colombia | Colombia–Selle Italia | 34 | |
| 44 | Hernán Darío Muñoz | Colombia | Colombia–Selle Italia | 27 | |
| 45 | Ruber Marín | Colombia | Colombia–Selle Italia | 74 | |
| 46 | Juan Diego Ramírez | Colombia | Colombia–Selle Italia | DNF | |
| 47 | Jhon García | Colombia | Colombia–Selle Italia | DNF | |
| 48 | Fortunato Baliani | Italy | Colombia–Selle Italia | DNF | |
| 49 | Mikhaylo Khalilov | Ukraine | Colombia–Selle Italia | 84 | |
| 51 | Michele Bartoli | Italy | Fassa Bortolo | DNF | |
| 52 | Wladimir Belli | Italy | Fassa Bortolo | DNF | |
| 53 | Francesco Casagrande | Italy | Fassa Bortolo | DNF | |
| 54 | Serhiy Honchar | Ukraine | Fassa Bortolo | 23 | |
| 55 | Alessandro Petacchi | Italy | Fassa Bortolo | 94 | |
| 56 | Gorazd Štangelj | Slovenia | Fassa Bortolo | DNF | |
| 57 | Matteo Tosatto | Italy | Fassa Bortolo | 63 | |
| 58 | Dimitri Konyshev | Russia | Fassa Bortolo | 103 | |
| 59 | Denis Zanette | Italy | Fassa Bortolo | 119 | |
| 61 | Daniele Contrini | Italy | Gerolsteiner | DNF | |
| 62 | Gianni Faresin | Italy | Gerolsteiner | 21 | |
| 63 | René Haselbacher | Austria | Gerolsteiner | 106 | |
| 64 | Ellis Rastelli | Italy | Gerolsteiner | 123 | |
| 65 | Davide Rebellin | Italy | Gerolsteiner | DNF | |
| 66 | Saulius Ruškys | Lithuania | Gerolsteiner | DNF | |
| 67 | Torsten Schmidt | Germany | Gerolsteiner | DNF | |
| 68 | Georg Totschnig | Austria | Gerolsteiner | 7 | |
| 69 | Peter Wrolich | Austria | Gerolsteiner | 82 | |
| 71 | Dario Andriotto | Italy | Index–Alexia Alluminio | DNF | |
| 72 | Mario Manzoni | Italy | Index–Alexia Alluminio | 136 | |
| 73 | Bo Hamburger | Denmark | Index–Alexia Alluminio | 77 | |
| 74 | Paolo Lanfranchi | Italy | Index–Alexia Alluminio | 41 | |
| 75 | Paolo Savoldelli | Italy | Index–Alexia Alluminio | 1 | |
| 76 | Eddy Serri | Italy | Index–Alexia Alluminio | 140 | |
| 77 | Ivan Quaranta | Italy | Index–Alexia Alluminio | DNF | |
| 78 | Daniele Righi | Italy | Index–Alexia Alluminio | 85 | |
| 79 | Mauro Zinetti | Italy | Index–Alexia Alluminio | DNF | |
| 81 | Ángel Vicioso | Spain | Kelme–Costa Blanca | 50 | |
| 82 | Aitor González | Spain | Kelme–Costa Blanca | 6 | |
| 83 | Isaac Gálvez | Spain | Kelme–Costa Blanca | 121 | |
| 84 | Francisco León Mane | Spain | Kelme–Costa Blanca | 69 | |
| 85 | Juan José de los Ángeles | Spain | Kelme–Costa Blanca | 33 | |
| 86 | Jesús Manzano | Spain | Kelme–Costa Blanca | DNF | |
| 87 | José Julia | Spain | Kelme–Costa Blanca | 88 | |
| 88 | Santiago Pérez | Spain | Kelme–Costa Blanca | DNF | |
| 89 | Gustavo Otero | Spain | Kelme–Costa Blanca | 62 | |
| 91 | Pavel Tonkov | Russia | Lampre–Daikin | 5 | |
| 92 | Simone Bertoletti | Italy | Lampre–Daikin | DNF | |
| 93 | Massimo Codol | Italy | Lampre–Daikin | DNF | |
| 94 | Juan Manuel Gárate | Spain | Lampre–Daikin | 4 | |
| 95 | Gabriele Missaglia | Italy | Lampre–Daikin | 72 | |
| 96 | Mariano Piccoli | Italy | Lampre–Daikin | 43 | |
| 97 | Milan Kadlec | Czech Republic | Lampre–Daikin | 64 | |
| 98 | Max Sciandri | Italy | Lampre–Daikin | 68 | |
| 99 | Sergio Barbero | Italy | Lampre–Daikin | 66 | |
| 101 | Rolf Sørensen | Denmark | Landbouwkrediet–Colnago | 124 | |
| 102 | Yaroslav Popovych | Ukraine | Landbouwkrediet–Colnago | 12 | |
| 103 | Lorenzo Bernucci | Italy | Landbouwkrediet–Colnago | 76 | |
| 104 | Domenico Romano | Italy | Landbouwkrediet–Colnago | DNF | |
| 105 | Oscar Cavagnis | Italy | Landbouwkrediet–Colnago | 120 | |
| 106 | Marc Streel | Belgium | Landbouwkrediet–Colnago | DNF | |
| 107 | Sergey Advejev | Ukraine | Landbouwkrediet–Colnago | 54 | |
| 108 | Volodymyr Bileka | Ukraine | Landbouwkrediet–Colnago | DNF | |
| 109 | Yuriy Metlushenko | Ukraine | Landbouwkrediet–Colnago | DNF | |
| 111 | Christophe Detilloux | Belgium | Lotto–Adecco | 118 | |
| 112 | Robbie McEwen | Australia | Lotto–Adecco | DNF | |
| 113 | Thierry Marichal | Belgium | Lotto–Adecco | 97 | |
| 114 | Stefan van Dijk | Netherlands | Lotto–Adecco | DNF | |
| 115 | Kurt Van De Wouwer | Belgium | Lotto–Adecco | 26 | |
| 116 | Kurt Van Lancker | Belgium | Lotto–Adecco | DNF | |
| 117 | Ief Verbrugghe | Belgium | Lotto–Adecco | DNF | |
| 118 | Rik Verbrugghe | Belgium | Lotto–Adecco | 9 | |
| 119 | Aart Vierhouten | Netherlands | Lotto–Adecco | 104 | |
| 121 | Paolo Bettini | Italy | Mapei–Quick-Step | DNF | |
| 122 | Davide Bramati | Italy | Mapei–Quick-Step | 71 | |
| 123 | Dario Cioni | Italy | Mapei–Quick-Step | 29 | |
| 124 | Cadel Evans | Australia | Mapei–Quick-Step | 14 | |
| 125 | Paolo Fornaciari | Italy | Mapei–Quick-Step | 92 | |
| 126 | Stefano Garzelli | Italy | Mapei–Quick-Step | DNF | |
| 127 | Robert Hunter | South Africa | Mapei–Quick-Step | DNF | |
| 128 | Daniele Nardello | Italy | Mapei–Quick-Step | 42 | |
| 129 | Andrea Noè | Italy | Mapei–Quick-Step | 20 | |
| 131 | Marco Pantani | Italy | Mercatone Uno | DNF | |
| 132 | Andrey Mizurov | Kazakhstan | Mercatone Uno | 37 | |
| 133 | Daniel Clavero | Spain | Mercatone Uno | DNF | |
| 134 | Riccardo Forconi | Italy | Mercatone Uno | DNF | |
| 135 | Luca Mazzanti | Italy | Mercatone Uno | 67 | |
| 136 | Francesco Secchiari | Italy | Mercatone Uno | DNF | |
| 137 | Roberto Sgambelluri | Italy | Mercatone Uno | DNF | |
| 138 | Gianmario Ortenzi | Italy | Mercatone Uno | 99 | |
| 139 | Fabiano Fontanelli | Italy | Mercatone Uno | 135 | |
| 141 | Domenico Gualdi | Italy | Mobilvetta Design–Formaggi Trentini | DNF | |
| 142 | Ruggero Marzoli | Italy | Mobilvetta Design–Formaggi Trentini | DNF | |
| 143 | Saša Gajičić | Yugoslavia | Mobilvetta Design–Formaggi Trentini | DNF | |
| 144 | Antonio Rizzi | Italy | Mobilvetta Design–Formaggi Trentini | DNF | |
| 145 | Moreno Di Biase | Italy | Mobilvetta Design–Formaggi Trentini | 137 | |
| 146 | Denis Bondarenko | Russia | Mobilvetta Design–Formaggi Trentini | 105 | |
| 147 | Uroš Murn | Slovenia | Mobilvetta Design–Formaggi Trentini | 86 | |
| 148 | Héctor Mesa | Colombia | Mobilvetta Design–Formaggi Trentini | 80 | |
| 149 | Luis Laverde | Colombia | Mobilvetta Design–Formaggi Trentini | 31 | |
| 151 | Matthias Buxhofer | Austria | Phonak | 55 | |
| 152 | Juan Carlos Domínguez | Spain | Phonak | 75 | |
| 153 | Cédric Fragnière | Switzerland | Phonak | DNF | |
| 154 | Fabrice Gougot | France | Phonak | 127 | |
| 155 | Bert Grabsch | Germany | Phonak | 61 | |
| 156 | Alexandre Moos | Switzerland | Phonak | 51 | |
| 157 | Óscar Pereiro | Spain | Phonak | 11 | |
| 158 | Massimo Strazzer | Italy | Phonak | 116 | |
| 159 | Sven Teutenberg | Germany | Phonak | DNF | |
| 161 | Michael Boogerd | Netherlands | Rabobank | 17 | |
| 162 | Jan Boven | Netherlands | Rabobank | 57 | |
| 163 | Marc Lotz | Netherlands | Rabobank | 70 | |
| 164 | Geert Verheyen | Belgium | Rabobank | 47 | |
| 165 | Steven de Jongh | Netherlands | Rabobank | 98 | |
| 166 | Addy Engels | Netherlands | Rabobank | 24 | |
| 167 | Grischa Niermann | Germany | Rabobank | 22 | |
| 168 | Mathew Hayman | Australia | Rabobank | 91 | |
| 169 | Thorwald Veneberg | Netherlands | Rabobank | 65 | |
| 171 | Dario Frigo | Italy | Tacconi Sport | 10 | |
| 172 | Ruggero Borghi | Italy | Tacconi Sport | DNF | |
| 173 | Massimo Apollonio | Italy | Tacconi Sport | 114 | |
| 174 | Eddy Mazzoleni | Italy | Tacconi Sport | 15 | |
| 175 | Zoran Klemenčič | Slovenia | Tacconi Sport | DNF | |
| 176 | Mauro Gerosa | Italy | Tacconi Sport | 102 | |
| 177 | Sylwester Szmyd | Poland | Tacconi Sport | 44 | |
| 178 | Mauro Radaelli | Italy | Tacconi Sport | 113 | |
| 179 | Steve Zampieri | Switzerland | Tacconi Sport | 89 | |
| 181 | Manuel Beltrán | Spain | Team Coast | 52 | |
| 182 | André Korff | Germany | Team Coast | 115 | |
| 183 | Fernando Escartín | Spain | Team Coast | 8 | |
| 184 | Fabrizio Guidi | Italy | Team Coast | DNF | |
| 185 | Frank Høj | Denmark | Team Coast | 107 | |
| 186 | Francisco Lara | Spain | Team Coast | 46 | |
| 187 | Lars Michaelsen | Denmark | Team Coast | 112 | |
| 188 | Raphael Schweda | Germany | Team Coast | 78 | |
| 189 | Malte Urban | Germany | Team Coast | 134 | |
| 191 | Denis Lunghi | Italy | Team Colpack–Astro | 30 | |
| 192 | Matteo Carrara | Italy | Team Colpack–Astro | 81 | |
| 193 | Michele Colleoni | Italy | Team Colpack–Astro | DNF | |
| 194 | Matteo Gigli | Italy | Team Colpack–Astro | 133 | |
| 195 | Leonardo Giordani | Italy | Team Colpack–Astro | DNF | |
| 196 | Renzo Mazzoleni | Italy | Team Colpack–Astro | 96 | |
| 197 | Miguel Ángel Meza | Mexico | Team Colpack–Astro | 129 | |
| 198 | Hidenori Nodera | Japan | Team Colpack–Astro | 139 | |
| 199 | Vladimir Smirnov | Lithuania | Team Colpack–Astro | DNF | |
| 201 | Carlos Sastre | Spain | CSC–Tiscali | 38 | |
| 202 | Francisco Cerezo | Spain | CSC–Tiscali | 59 | |
| 203 | Marcelino García Alonso | Spain | CSC–Tiscali | 39 | |
| 204 | Tyler Hamilton | United States | CSC–Tiscali | 2 | |
| 205 | Danny Jonasson | Denmark | CSC–Tiscali | 132 | |
| 206 | Jimmi Madsen | Denmark | CSC–Tiscali | 108 | |
| 207 | Andrea Peron | Italy | CSC–Tiscali | 73 | |
| 208 | Michael Rasmussen | Denmark | CSC–Tiscali | 45 | |
| 209 | Manuel Calvente | Spain | CSC–Tiscali | 60 | |
| 211 | Ralf Grabsch | Germany | Team Telekom | 111 | |
| 212 | Serguei Yakovlev | Kazakhstan | Team Telekom | 90 | |
| 213 | Torsten Hiekmann | Germany | Team Telekom | 49 | |
| 214 | Jens Heppner | Germany | Team Telekom | DNF | |
| 215 | Danilo Hondo | Germany | Team Telekom | DNF | |
| 216 | Kai Hundertmarck | Germany | Team Telekom | 93 | |
| 217 | Matthias Kessler | Germany | Team Telekom | 25 | |
| 218 | Jan Schaffrath | Germany | Team Telekom | 122 | |
| 219 | Stephan Schreck | Germany | Team Telekom | 110 | |
