= List of teams and cyclists in the 2001 Giro d'Italia =

The 2001 Giro d'Italia was the 84th edition of the Giro d'Italia, one of cycling's Grand Tours. The field consisted of 180 riders, and 136 riders finished the race.

== By rider ==
Legend
| No. | Starting number worn by the rider during the Giro |
| Pos. | Position in the general classification |
| DNF | Denotes a rider who did not finish |

| No. | Name | Nationality | Team | Pos. | Ref |
|---|---|---|---|---|---|
| 1 | Stefano Garzelli | Italy | Mapei–Quick-Step | DNF | |
| 2 | Rinaldo Nocentini | Italy | Mapei–Quick-Step | 66 | |
| 3 | Manuel Beltrán | Spain | Mapei–Quick-Step | DNF | |
| 4 | Davide Bramati | Italy | Mapei–Quick-Step | 92 | |
| 5 | Luca Scinto | Italy | Mapei–Quick-Step | 109 | |
| 6 | Paolo Fornaciari | Italy | Mapei–Quick-Step | 112 | |
| 7 | Paolo Lanfranchi | Italy | Mapei–Quick-Step | 41 | |
| 8 | Andrea Noè | Italy | Mapei–Quick-Step | 6 | |
| 9 | Stefano Zanini | Italy | Mapei–Quick-Step | 93 | |
| 11 | Stefano Casagranda | Italy | Alessio | 108 | |
| 12 | Davide Casarotto | Italy | Alessio | 96 | |
| 13 | Pietro Caucchioli | Italy | Alessio | 9 | |
| 14 | Ivan Gotti | Italy | Alessio | 7 | |
| 15 | Martin Hvastija | Slovenia | Alessio | 105 | |
| 16 | Ruslan Ivanov | Moldova | Alessio | 39 | |
| 17 | Endrio Leoni | Italy | Alessio | DNF | |
| 18 | Alexandr Shefer | Kazakhstan | Alessio | 25 | |
| 19 | Mauro Zanetti | Italy | Alessio | 17 | |
| 21 | Dario Andriotto | Italy | Alexia Alluminio | 130 | |
| 22 | Andrea Brognara | Italy | Alexia Alluminio | 131 | |
| 23 | Pascal Hervé | France | Alexia Alluminio | DNF | |
| 24 | Marco Magnani | Italy | Alexia Alluminio | 18 | |
| 25 | Gianluca Valoti | Italy | Alexia Alluminio | 51 | |
| 26 | Mario Manzoni | Italy | Alexia Alluminio | 116 | |
| 27 | Ivan Quaranta | Italy | Alexia Alluminio | 129 | |
| 28 | Eddy Serri | Italy | Alexia Alluminio | 134 | |
| 29 | Marco Villa | Italy | Alexia Alluminio | 133 | |
| 31 | Jean-Cyril Robin | France | Bonjour | DNF | |
| 32 | Franck Bouyer | France | Bonjour | DNF | |
| 33 | Pascal Deramé | France | Bonjour | DNF | |
| 34 | Thomas Voeckler | France | Bonjour | 135 | |
| 35 | Noan Lelarge | France | Bonjour | DNF | |
| 36 | Frédéric Mainguenaud | France | Bonjour | DNF | |
| 37 | Damien Nazon | France | Bonjour | DNF | |
| 38 | Mickaël Pichon | France | Bonjour | DNF | |
| 39 | Fabrice Salanson | France | Bonjour | DNF | |
| 41 | Danilo Di Luca | Italy | Cantina Tollo–Acqua & Sapone | 24 | |
| 42 | Gabriele Colombo | Italy | Cantina Tollo–Acqua & Sapone | 65 | |
| 43 | Roberto Conti | Italy | Cantina Tollo–Acqua & Sapone | 55 | |
| 44 | Massimiliano Gentili | Italy | Cantina Tollo–Acqua & Sapone | 22 | |
| 45 | Filippo Simeoni | Italy | Cantina Tollo–Acqua & Sapone | DNF | |
| 46 | Alessandro Spezialetti | Italy | Cantina Tollo–Acqua & Sapone | 64 | |
| 47 | Guido Trenti | United States | Cantina Tollo–Acqua & Sapone | 124 | |
| 48 | Serguei Yakovlev | Kazakhstan | Cantina Tollo–Acqua & Sapone | 53 | |
| 49 | Cristian Pepoli | Italy | Cantina Tollo–Acqua & Sapone | 103 | |
| 51 | Giuliano Figueras | Italy | Ceramiche Panaria–Fiordo | 10 | |
| 52 | Nathan O'Neill | Australia | Ceramiche Panaria–Fiordo | DNF | |
| 53 | Vladimir Duma | Ukraine | Ceramiche Panaria–Fiordo | 36 | |
| 54 | Michele Coppolillo | Italy | Ceramiche Panaria–Fiordo | 136 | |
| 55 | Enrico Degano | Italy | Ceramiche Panaria–Fiordo | DNF | |
| 56 | Julio Alberto Pérez | Mexico | Ceramiche Panaria–Fiordo | 45 | |
| 57 | Domenico Romano | Italy | Ceramiche Panaria–Fiordo | 125 | |
| 58 | Antonio Varriale | Italy | Ceramiche Panaria–Fiordo | 86 | |
| 59 | Tom Leaper | Australia | Ceramiche Panaria–Fiordo | DNF | |
| 61 | Fabio Baldato | Italy | Fassa Bortolo | 79 | |
| 62 | Wladimir Belli | Italy | Fassa Bortolo | DNF | |
| 63 | Francesco Casagrande | Italy | Fassa Bortolo | DNF | |
| 64 | Dario Frigo | Italy | Fassa Bortolo | DNF | |
| 65 | Dimitri Konyshev | Russia | Fassa Bortolo | 75 | |
| 66 | Andrea Peron | Italy | Fassa Bortolo | 43 | |
| 67 | Roberto Petito | Italy | Fassa Bortolo | 100 | |
| 68 | Matteo Tosatto | Italy | Fassa Bortolo | 50 | |
| 69 | Tadej Valjavec | Slovenia | Fassa Bortolo | 30 | |
| 71 | José Luis Arrieta | Spain | iBanesto.com | 29 | |
| 72 | Marzio Bruseghin | Italy | iBanesto.com | 16 | |
| 73 | Pablo Lastras | Spain | iBanesto.com | 49 | |
| 74 | David Navas | Spain | iBanesto.com | 88 | |
| 75 | David Latasa | Spain | iBanesto.com | 35 | |
| 76 | Jon Odriozola | Spain | iBanesto.com | 59 | |
| 77 | Unai Osa | Spain | iBanesto.com | 3 | |
| 78 | Leonardo Piepoli | Italy | iBanesto.com | DNF | |
| 79 | César Solaun | Spain | iBanesto.com | 28 | |
| 81 | Laurent Desbiens | France | Kelme–Costa Blanca | 102 | |
| 82 | Juan Miguel Cuenca | Spain | Kelme–Costa Blanca | DNF | |
| 83 | Alexis Rodríguez | Spain | Kelme–Costa Blanca | 69 | |
| 84 | Francisco León | Spain | Kelme–Costa Blanca | 31 | |
| 85 | Gustavo Otero | Spain | Kelme–Costa Blanca | DNF | |
| 86 | Joaquín López | Spain | Kelme–Costa Blanca | 57 | |
| 87 | Jesús Manzano | Spain | Kelme–Costa Blanca | DNF | |
| 88 | Carlos García Quesada | Spain | Kelme–Costa Blanca | DNF | |
| 89 | Juan José de los Ángeles | Spain | Kelme–Costa Blanca | DNF | |
| 91 | Gilberto Simoni | Italy | Lampre–Daikin | 1 | |
| 92 | Oscar Camenzind | Switzerland | Lampre–Daikin | 27 | |
| 93 | Massimo Codol | Italy | Lampre–Daikin | 37 | |
| 94 | Sergio Barbero | Italy | Lampre–Daikin | DNF | |
| 95 | Mariano Piccoli | Italy | Lampre–Daikin | 87 | |
| 96 | Simone Bertoletti | Italy | Lampre–Daikin | 82 | |
| 97 | Juan Manuel Gárate | Spain | Lampre–Daikin | 20 | |
| 98 | Max Sciandri | Great Britain | Lampre–Daikin | 58 | |
| 99 | Gabriele Missaglia | Italy | Lampre–Daikin | 60 | |
| 101 | Davide Rebellin | Italy | Liquigas–Pata | DNF | |
| 102 | Serhiy Honchar | Ukraine | Liquigas–Pata | 4 | |
| 103 | Marco Zanotti | Italy | Liquigas–Pata | 117 | |
| 104 | Denis Zanette | Italy | Liquigas–Pata | 101 | |
| 105 | Gorazd Štangelj | Slovenia | Liquigas–Pata | 72 | |
| 106 | Stefano Cattai | Italy | Liquigas–Pata | 67 | |
| 107 | Ellis Rastelli | Italy | Liquigas–Pata | 85 | |
| 108 | Gianni Faresin | Italy | Liquigas–Pata | 19 | |
| 109 | Mirko Marini | Italy | Liquigas–Pata | 113 | |
| 111 | Mario Aerts | Belgium | Lotto–Adecco | 63 | |
| 112 | Christophe Brandt | Belgium | Lotto–Adecco | 42 | |
| 113 | Jeroen Blijlevens | Netherlands | Lotto–Adecco | 99 | |
| 114 | Hans De Clercq | Belgium | Lotto–Adecco | 126 | |
| 115 | Glenn D'Hollander | Belgium | Lotto–Adecco | DNF | |
| 116 | Niko Eeckhout | Belgium | Lotto–Adecco | DNF | |
| 117 | Kurt Van Lancker | Belgium | Lotto–Adecco | 78 | |
| 118 | Rik Verbrugghe | Belgium | Lotto–Adecco | DNF | |
| 119 | Ief Verbrugghe | Belgium | Lotto–Adecco | 122 | |
| 121 | Marco Pantani | Italy | Mercatone Uno–Stream TV | DNF | |
| 122 | Daniel Clavero | Spain | Mercatone Uno–Stream TV | 26 | |
| 123 | Ermanno Brignoli | Italy | Mercatone Uno–Stream TV | 97 | |
| 124 | Marco Velo | Italy | Mercatone Uno–Stream TV | 11 | |
| 125 | Marcello Siboni | Italy | Mercatone Uno–Stream TV | 84 | |
| 126 | Gianpaolo Mondini | Italy | Mercatone Uno–Stream TV | 74 | |
| 127 | Daniele De Paoli | Italy | Mercatone Uno–Stream TV | 21 | |
| 128 | Riccardo Forconi | Italy | Mercatone Uno–Stream TV | DNF | |
| 129 | Simone Borgheresi | Italy | Mercatone Uno–Stream TV | 95 | |
| 131 | Alberto Ongarato | Italy | Mobilvetta Design–Formaggi Trentini | 115 | |
| 132 | Massimo Strazzer | Italy | Mobilvetta Design–Formaggi Trentini | 94 | |
| 133 | Moreno Di Biase | Italy | Mobilvetta Design–Formaggi Trentini | 118 | |
| 134 | Uroš Murn | Slovenia | Mobilvetta Design–Formaggi Trentini | 81 | |
| 135 | Michele Gobbi | Italy | Mobilvetta Design–Formaggi Trentini | 128 | |
| 136 | Devis Miorin | Italy | Mobilvetta Design–Formaggi Trentini | 123 | |
| 137 | Timothy Jones | Zimbabwe | Mobilvetta Design–Formaggi Trentini | 73 | |
| 138 | José Jaime González | Colombia | Mobilvetta Design–Formaggi Trentini | DNF | |
| 139 | Domenico Gualdi | Italy | Mobilvetta Design–Formaggi Trentini | 132 | |
| 141 | Abraham Olano | Spain | ONCE–Eroski | 2 | |
| 142 | René Andrle | Czech Republic | ONCE–Eroski | 62 | |
| 143 | José Azevedo | Portugal | ONCE–Eroski | 5 | |
| 144 | Francisco Tomás García | Spain | ONCE–Eroski | DNF | |
| 145 | Álvaro González de Galdeano | Spain | ONCE–Eroski | 70 | |
| 146 | Jan Hruška | Czech Republic | ONCE–Eroski | 47 | |
| 147 | Isidro Nozal | Spain | ONCE–Eroski | 68 | |
| 148 | Miguel Ángel Peña | Spain | ONCE–Eroski | DNF | |
| 149 | Joaquim Rodríguez | Spain | ONCE–Eroski | 80 | |
| 151 | Mario Cipollini | Italy | Saeco | 107 | |
| 152 | Biagio Conte | Italy | Saeco | 127 | |
| 153 | Laurent Dufaux | Switzerland | Saeco | 40 | |
| 154 | Massimiliano Mori | Italy | Saeco | 119 | |
| 155 | Pavel Padrnos | Czech Republic | Saeco | 38 | |
| 156 | Fabio Sacchi | Italy | Saeco | DNF | |
| 157 | Paolo Savoldelli | Italy | Saeco | 14 | |
| 158 | Mario Scirea | Italy | Saeco | 121 | |
| 159 | Francesco Secchiari | Italy | Saeco | 48 | |
| 161 | Hernán Buenahora | Colombia | Selle Italia–Pacific | 13 | |
| 162 | José Castelblanco | Colombia | Selle Italia–Pacific | 15 | |
| 163 | Carlos Alberto Contreras | Colombia | Selle Italia–Pacific | 8 | |
| 164 | Fredy González | Colombia | Selle Italia–Pacific | 46 | |
| 165 | Ruber Marín | Colombia | Selle Italia–Pacific | 110 | |
| 166 | Fortunato Baliani | Italy | Selle Italia–Pacific | 32 | |
| 167 | Leonardo Scarselli | Italy | Selle Italia–Pacific | 120 | |
| 168 | Gianluca Tonetti | Italy | Selle Italia–Pacific | DNF | |
| 169 | Jhon García | Colombia | Selle Italia–Pacific | DNF | |
| 171 | Giuseppe Di Grande | Italy | Tacconi Sport–Vini Caldirola | DNF | |
| 172 | Peter Luttenberger | Austria | Tacconi Sport–Vini Caldirola | 12 | |
| 173 | Paolo Bossoni | Italy | Tacconi Sport–Vini Caldirola | 104 | |
| 174 | Ruggero Borghi | Italy | Tacconi Sport–Vini Caldirola | 34 | |
| 175 | Diego Ferrari | Italy | Tacconi Sport–Vini Caldirola | 106 | |
| 176 | Mauro Gerosa | Italy | Tacconi Sport–Vini Caldirola | 77 | |
| 177 | Nicola Miceli | Italy | Tacconi Sport–Vini Caldirola | DNF | |
| 178 | Zoran Klemenčič | Slovenia | Tacconi Sport–Vini Caldirola | DNF | |
| 179 | Andrej Hauptman | Slovenia | Tacconi Sport–Vini Caldirola | 56 | |
| 181 | Fabio Bulgarelli | Italy | Team Colpack–Astro | 71 | |
| 182 | Matteo Carrara | Italy | Team Colpack–Astro | 111 | |
| 183 | Michele Colleoni | Italy | Team Colpack–Astro | 76 | |
| 184 | Alessandro Cortinovis | Italy | Team Colpack–Astro | 90 | |
| 185 | Gianni Gobbini | Italy | Team Colpack–Astro | DNF | |
| 186 | Denis Lunghi | Italy | Team Colpack–Astro | 61 | |
| 187 | Rafael Mateos | Spain | Team Colpack–Astro | DNF | |
| 188 | Renzo Mazzoleni | Italy | Team Colpack–Astro | 83 | |
| 189 | Hidenori Nodera | Japan | Team Colpack–Astro | DNF | |
| 191 | Jan Ullrich | Germany | Team Telekom | 52 | |
| 192 | Alberto Elli | Italy | Team Telekom | 54 | |
| 193 | Giuseppe Guerini | Italy | Team Telekom | 44 | |
| 194 | Kai Hundertmarck | Germany | Team Telekom | 98 | |
| 195 | Danilo Hondo | Germany | Team Telekom | 91 | |
| 196 | Matthias Kessler | Germany | Team Telekom | 23 | |
| 197 | Kevin Livingston | United States | Team Telekom | 114 | |
| 198 | Giovanni Lombardi | Italy | Team Telekom | 89 | |
| 199 | Roberto Sgambelluri | Italy | Team Telekom | 33 | |
