= 2002 Giro d'Italia, Stage 11 to Stage 20 =

Cycling race stages

The 2002 Giro d'Italia was the 85th edition of the Giro d'Italia, one of cycling's Grand Tours. The Giro began in Groningen, the Netherlands, with a Prologue individual time trial on 11 May, and Stage 11 occurred on 23 May with a stage from Benevento. The race finished in Milan on 2 June.

== Stage 11 ==
23 May 2002 — Benevento to Campitello Matese, 140 km (87 mi)

Stage 11 result

Rank	Rider	Team	Time
1	Gilberto Simoni (ITA)	Saeco–Longoni Sport	4h 03' 37"
2	Francesco Casagrande (ITA)	Fassa Bortolo	s.t.
3	Franco Pellizotti (ITA)	Alessio	+ 4"
4	Fernando Escartín (ESP)	Team Coast	s.t.
5	Dario Frigo (ITA)	Tacconi Sport	s.t.
6	Andrea Noè (ITA)	Mapei–Quick-Step	s.t.
7	José Castelblanco (COL)	Colombia–Selle Italia	s.t.
8	Pietro Caucchioli (ITA)	Alessio	s.t.
9	Aitor González (ESP)	Kelme–Costa Blanca	s.t.
10	Juan Manuel Gárate (ESP)	Lampre–Daikin	s.t.

General classification after Stage 11

Rank	Rider	Team	Time
1	Jens Heppner (GER)	Team Telekom	52h 54' 27"
2	Francesco Casagrande (ITA)	Fassa Bortolo	+ 2' 58"
3	Gilberto Simoni (ITA)	Saeco–Longoni Sport	+ 3' 15"
4	Paolo Savoldelli (ITA)	Index–Alexia Alluminio	+ 3' 43"
5	Pietro Caucchioli (ITA)	Alessio	s.t.
6	Fernando Escartín (ESP)	Team Coast	+ 3' 46"
7	Yaroslav Popovych (UKR)	Landbouwkrediet–Colnago	+ 3' 50"
8	Wladimir Belli (ITA)	Fassa Bortolo	+ 3' 55"
9	Aitor González (ESP)	Kelme–Costa Blanca	+ 3' 58"
10	Cadel Evans (AUS)	Mapei–Quick-Step	+ 4' 03"

== Stage 12 ==
24 May 2002 — Campobasso to Chieti, 200 km (120 mi)

Stage 12 result

Rank	Rider	Team	Time
1	Denis Lunghi (ITA)	Team Colpack–Astro	5h 38' 16"
2	Bert Grabsch (GER)	Phonak	+ 37"
3	Lorenzo Bernucci (ITA)	Landbouwkrediet–Colnago	+ 38"
4	Alessandro Bertolini (ITA)	Alessio	+ 54"
5	Matthias Buxhofer (AUT)	Phonak	s.t.
6	Peter Wrolich (AUT)	Gerolsteiner	+ 3' 43"
7	Mikhaylo Khalilov (UKR)	Colombia–Selle Italia	+ 7' 47"
8	Mariano Piccoli (ITA)	Lampre–Daikin	s.t.
9	Alexandre Moos (SUI)	Phonak	s.t.
10	Jhon García (COL)	Colombia–Selle Italia	s.t.

General classification after Stage 12

Rank	Rider	Team	Time
1	Jens Heppner (GER)	Team Telekom	58h 40' 30"
2	Francesco Casagrande (ITA)	Fassa Bortolo	+ 2' 58"
3	Paolo Savoldelli (ITA)	Index–Alexia Alluminio	+ 3' 43"
4	Pietro Caucchioli (ITA)	Alessio	s.t.
5	Fernando Escartín (ESP)	Team Coast	+ 3' 46"
6	Yaroslav Popovych (UKR)	Landbouwkrediet–Colnago	+ 3' 50"
7	Wladimir Belli (ITA)	Fassa Bortolo	+ 3' 55"
8	Aitor González (ESP)	Kelme–Costa Blanca	+ 3' 58"
9	Dario Frigo (ITA)	Tacconi Sport	+ 4' 00"
10	Cadel Evans (AUS)	Mapei–Quick-Step	+ 4' 03"

== Stage 13 ==
25 May 2002 — Chieti to San Giacomo di Valle Castellana, 190 km (120 mi)

Stage 13 result

Rank	Rider	Team	Time
1	Julio Alberto Pérez (MEX)	Ceramiche Panaria–Fiordo	5h 04' 02"
2	Cadel Evans (AUS)	Mapei–Quick-Step	+ 13"
3	Dario Frigo (ITA)	Tacconi Sport	+ 17"
4	Francesco Casagrande (ITA)	Fassa Bortolo	+ 19"
5	Fernando Escartín (ESP)	Team Coast	s.t.
6	Franco Pellizotti (ITA)	Alessio	s.t.
7	Michael Boogerd (NED)	Rabobank	+ 22"
8	Pietro Caucchioli (ITA)	Alessio	s.t.
9	Ivan Gotti (ITA)	Alessio	s.t.
10	Aitor González (ESP)	Kelme–Costa Blanca	s.t.

General classification after Stage 13

Rank	Rider	Team	Time
1	Jens Heppner (GER)	Team Telekom	63h 46' 01"
2	Francesco Casagrande (ITA)	Fassa Bortolo	+ 1' 48"
3	Fernando Escartín (ESP)	Team Coast	+ 2' 36"
4	Pietro Caucchioli (ITA)	Alessio	s.t.
5	Cadel Evans (AUS)	Mapei–Quick-Step	+ 2' 39"
6	Dario Frigo (ITA)	Tacconi Sport	+ 2' 44"
7	Paolo Savoldelli (ITA)	Index–Alexia Alluminio	+ 2' 45"
8	Aitor González (ESP)	Kelme–Costa Blanca	+ 2' 51"
9	Wladimir Belli (ITA)	Fassa Bortolo	+ 2' 57"
10	Franco Pellizotti (ITA)	Alessio	+ 3' 07"

== Stage 14 ==
26 May 2002 — Numana to Numana, 30.3 km (18.8 mi) (ITT)

Stage 14 result

Rank	Rider	Team	Time
1	Tyler Hamilton (USA)	CSC–Tiscali	41' 21"
2	Serhiy Honchar (UKR)	Fassa Bortolo	+ 31"
3	Cadel Evans (AUS)	Mapei–Quick-Step	+ 41"
4	Rik Verbrugghe (BEL)	Lotto–Adecco	+ 53"
5	Aitor González (ESP)	Kelme–Costa Blanca	+ 56"
6	Dario Frigo (ITA)	Tacconi Sport	s.t.
7	Dario Cioni (ITA)	Mapei–Quick-Step	+ 1' 02"
8	Juan Manuel Gárate (ESP)	Lampre–Daikin	+ 1' 08"
9	Georg Totschnig (AUT)	Gerolsteiner	s.t.
10	Pietro Caucchioli (ITA)	Alessio	+ 1' 16"

General classification after Stage 14

Rank	Rider	Team	Time
1	Jens Heppner (GER)	Team Telekom	64h 29' 54"
2	Cadel Evans (AUS)	Mapei–Quick-Step	+ 48"
3	Tyler Hamilton (USA)	CSC–Tiscali	+ 1' 06"
4	Francesco Casagrande (ITA)	Fassa Bortolo	+ 1' 07"
5	Dario Frigo (ITA)	Tacconi Sport	+ 1' 11"
6	Aitor González (ESP)	Kelme–Costa Blanca	+ 1' 15"
7	Pietro Caucchioli (ITA)	Alessio	+ 1' 20"
8	Fernando Escartín (ESP)	Team Coast	+ 1' 40"
9	Paolo Savoldelli (ITA)	Index–Alexia Alluminio	+ 1' 49"
10	Rik Verbrugghe (BEL)	Lotto–Adecco	+ 2' 13"

== Rest day ==
27 May 2002

== Stage 15 ==
28 May 2002 — Terme Euganee to Conegliano, 156 km (97 mi)

Stage 15 result

Rank	Rider	Team	Time
1	Mario Cipollini (ITA)	Acqua & Sapone–Cantina Tollo	3h 42' 49"
2	Isaac Gálvez (ESP)	Kelme–Costa Blanca	s.t.
3	Alessandro Petacchi (ITA)	Fassa Bortolo	s.t.
4	Steven de Jongh (NED)	Rabobank	s.t.
5	Zoran Klemenčič (SLO)	Tacconi Sport	s.t.
6	René Haselbacher (AUT)	Gerolsteiner	s.t.
7	Massimo Strazzer (ITA)	Phonak	s.t.
8	Christophe Detilloux (BEL)	Lotto–Adecco	s.t.
9	Igor Astarloa (ESP)	Saeco–Longoni Sport	s.t.
10	Mathew Hayman (AUS)	Rabobank	s.t.

General classification after Stage 15

Rank	Rider	Team	Time
1	Jens Heppner (GER)	Team Telekom	68h 12' 43"
2	Cadel Evans (AUS)	Mapei–Quick-Step	+ 48"
3	Tyler Hamilton (USA)	CSC–Tiscali	+ 1' 06"
4	Dario Frigo (ITA)	Tacconi Sport	+ 1' 11"
5	Aitor González (ESP)	Kelme–Costa Blanca	+ 1' 15"
6	Pietro Caucchioli (ITA)	Alessio	+ 1' 20"
7	Fernando Escartín (ESP)	Team Coast	+ 1' 40"
8	Paolo Savoldelli (ITA)	Index–Alexia Alluminio	+ 1' 49"
9	Rik Verbrugghe (BEL)	Lotto–Adecco	+ 2' 13"
10	Juan Manuel Gárate (ESP)	Lampre–Daikin	+ 2' 17"

== Stage 16 ==
29 May 2002 — Conegliano to Corvara, 163 km (101 mi)

Stage 16 result

Rank	Rider	Team	Time
1	Julio Alberto Pérez (MEX)	Ceramiche Panaria–Fiordo	4h 54' 54"
2	Paolo Savoldelli (ITA)	Index–Alexia Alluminio	+ 53"
3	Dario Frigo (ITA)	Tacconi Sport	+ 55"
4	Juan Manuel Gárate (ESP)	Lampre–Daikin	s.t.
5	Aitor González (ESP)	Kelme–Costa Blanca	s.t.
6	Tyler Hamilton (USA)	CSC–Tiscali	+ 58"
7	Cadel Evans (AUS)	Mapei–Quick-Step	s.t.
8	Pietro Caucchioli (ITA)	Alessio	s.t.
9	Eddy Mazzoleni (ITA)	Tacconi Sport	+ 2' 09"
10	Óscar Pereiro (ESP)	Phonak	+ 2' 10"

General classification after Stage 16

Rank	Rider	Team	Time
1	Cadel Evans (AUS)	Mapei–Quick-Step	73h 09' 23"
2	Dario Frigo (ITA)	Tacconi Sport	+ 16"
3	Tyler Hamilton (USA)	CSC–Tiscali	+ 18"
4	Aitor González (ESP)	Kelme–Costa Blanca	+ 24"
5	Pietro Caucchioli (ITA)	Alessio	+ 32"
6	Paolo Savoldelli (ITA)	Index–Alexia Alluminio	+ 48"
7	Juan Manuel Gárate (ESP)	Lampre–Daikin	+ 1' 26"
8	Fernando Escartín (ESP)	Team Coast	+ 2' 09"
9	Rik Verbrugghe (BEL)	Lotto–Adecco	+ 4' 21"
10	Eddy Mazzoleni (ITA)	Tacconi Sport	+ 4' 26"

== Stage 17 ==
30 May 2002 — Corvara to Folgaria, 222 km (138 mi)

Stage 17 result

Rank	Rider	Team	Time
1	Pavel Tonkov (RUS)	Lampre–Daikin	7h 24' 57"
2	Paolo Savoldelli (ITA)	Index–Alexia Alluminio	+ 2' 11"
3	Juan Manuel Gárate (ESP)	Lampre–Daikin	+ 3' 08"
4	Georg Totschnig (AUT)	Gerolsteiner	+ 3' 14"
5	Denis Lunghi (ITA)	Team Colpack–Astro	s.t.
6	Pietro Caucchioli (ITA)	Alessio	s.t.
7	Hernán Darío Muñoz (COL)	Colombia–Selle Italia	+ 3' 21"
8	Fernando Escartín (ESP)	Team Coast	+ 4' 01"
9	Tyler Hamilton (USA)	CSC–Tiscali	s.t.
10	Addy Engels (NED)	Rabobank	+ 4' 14"

General classification after Stage 17

Rank	Rider	Team	Time
1	Paolo Savoldelli (ITA)	Index–Alexia Alluminio	80h 37' 11"
2	Pietro Caucchioli (ITA)	Alessio	+ 55"
3	Tyler Hamilton (USA)	CSC–Tiscali	+ 1' 28"
4	Juan Manuel Gárate (ESP)	Lampre–Daikin	+ 1' 39"
5	Pavel Tonkov (RUS)	Lampre–Daikin	+ 3' 08"
6	Fernando Escartín (ESP)	Team Coast	+ 3' 19"
7	Georg Totschnig (AUT)	Gerolsteiner	+ 5' 32"
8	Rik Verbrugghe (BEL)	Lotto–Adecco	+ 7' 54"
9	Aitor González (ESP)	Kelme–Costa Blanca	+ 8' 12"
10	Dario Frigo (ITA)	Tacconi Sport	+ 9' 41"

== Stage 18 ==
31 May 2002 — Rovereto to Brescia, 143 km (89 mi)

Stage 18 result

Rank	Rider	Team	Time
1	Mario Cipollini (ITA)	Acqua & Sapone–Cantina Tollo	4h 12' 44"
2	Alessandro Petacchi (ITA)	Fassa Bortolo	s.t.
3	René Haselbacher (AUT)	Gerolsteiner	s.t.
4	Lars Michaelsen (DEN)	Team Coast	s.t.
5	Massimo Strazzer (ITA)	Phonak	s.t.
6	Mariano Piccoli (ITA)	Lampre–Daikin	s.t.
7	Fabio Sacchi (ITA)	Saeco–Longoni Sport	s.t.
8	Aart Vierhouten (NED)	Lotto–Adecco	s.t.
9	Mauro Gerosa (ITA)	Tacconi Sport	s.t.
10	Biagio Conte (ITA)	Saeco–Longoni Sport	s.t.

General classification after Stage 18

Rank	Rider	Team	Time
1	Paolo Savoldelli (ITA)	Index–Alexia Alluminio	84h 49' 55"
2	Pietro Caucchioli (ITA)	Alessio	+ 55"
3	Tyler Hamilton (USA)	CSC–Tiscali	+ 1' 28"
4	Juan Manuel Gárate (ESP)	Lampre–Daikin	+ 1' 39"
5	Pavel Tonkov (RUS)	Lampre–Daikin	+ 3' 08"
6	Fernando Escartín (ESP)	Team Coast	+ 3' 19"
7	Georg Totschnig (AUT)	Gerolsteiner	+ 5' 32"
8	Rik Verbrugghe (BEL)	Lotto–Adecco	+ 7' 54"
9	Aitor González (ESP)	Kelme–Costa Blanca	+ 8' 12"
10	Dario Frigo (ITA)	Tacconi Sport	+ 9' 41"

== Stage 19 ==
1 June 2002 — Cambiago to Monticello Brianza, 44.3 km (27.5 mi) (ITT)

Stage 19 result

Rank	Rider	Team	Time
1	Aitor González (ESP)	Kelme–Costa Blanca	55' 56"
2	Serhiy Honchar (UKR)	Fassa Bortolo	+ 44"
3	Paolo Savoldelli (ITA)	Index–Alexia Alluminio	+ 1' 17"
4	Tyler Hamilton (USA)	CSC–Tiscali	+ 1' 31"
5	Bert Grabsch (GER)	Phonak	+ 2' 22"
6	Pietro Caucchioli (ITA)	Alessio	+ 2' 35"
7	Georg Totschnig (AUT)	Gerolsteiner	+ 2' 47"
8	Rik Verbrugghe (BEL)	Lotto–Adecco	+ 2' 48"
9	Juan Manuel Gárate (ESP)	Lampre–Daikin	+ 2' 53"
10	Daniele Nardello (ITA)	Mapei–Quick-Step	+ 3' 14"

General classification after Stage 19

Rank	Rider	Team	Time
1	Paolo Savoldelli (ITA)	Index–Alexia Alluminio	85h 47' 09"
2	Tyler Hamilton (USA)	CSC–Tiscali	+ 1' 41"
3	Pietro Caucchioli (ITA)	Alessio	+ 2' 12"
4	Juan Manuel Gárate (ESP)	Lampre–Daikin	+ 3' 14"
5	Pavel Tonkov (RUS)	Lampre–Daikin	+ 5' 34"
6	Aitor González (ESP)	Kelme–Costa Blanca	+ 6' 54"
7	Georg Totschnig (AUT)	Gerolsteiner	+ 7' 02"
8	Fernando Escartín (ESP)	Team Coast	+ 7' 07"
9	Rik Verbrugghe (BEL)	Lotto–Adecco	+ 9' 24"
10	Dario Frigo (ITA)	Tacconi Sport	+ 11' 50"

== Stage 20 ==
2 June 2002 — Cantù to Milan, 142 km (88 mi)

Stage 20 result

Rank	Rider	Team	Time
1	Mario Cipollini (ITA)	Acqua & Sapone–Cantina Tollo	3h 35' 28"
2	Alessandro Petacchi (ITA)	Fassa Bortolo	s.t.
3	René Haselbacher (AUT)	Gerolsteiner	s.t.
4	Isaac Gálvez (ESP)	Kelme–Costa Blanca	s.t.
5	Fabio Sacchi (ITA)	Saeco–Longoni Sport	s.t.
6	Steven de Jongh (NED)	Rabobank	s.t.
7	Lars Michaelsen (DEN)	Team Coast	s.t.
8	Aart Vierhouten (NED)	Lotto–Adecco	s.t.
9	Cristian Moreni (ITA)	Alessio	s.t.
10	Angelo Furlan (ITA)	Alessio	s.t.

General classification after Stage 20

Rank	Rider	Team	Time
1	Paolo Savoldelli (ITA)	Index–Alexia Alluminio	89h 22' 42"
2	Tyler Hamilton (USA)	CSC–Tiscali	+ 1' 41"
3	Pietro Caucchioli (ITA)	Alessio	+ 2' 12"
4	Juan Manuel Gárate (ESP)	Lampre–Daikin	+ 3' 14"
5	Pavel Tonkov (RUS)	Lampre–Daikin	+ 5' 34"
6	Aitor González (ESP)	Kelme–Costa Blanca	+ 6' 54"
7	Georg Totschnig (AUT)	Gerolsteiner	+ 7' 02"
8	Fernando Escartín (ESP)	Team Coast	+ 7' 07"
9	Rik Verbrugghe (BEL)	Lotto–Adecco	+ 9' 24"
10	Dario Frigo (ITA)	Tacconi Sport	+ 11' 50"
