= Trofeo dello Scalatore =

Race details
- Date: August
- Region: Marche, Italy
- English name: Climber's Trophy
- Discipline: Road
- Type: One-day race

History
- First edition: 1987
- Editions: 15
- Final edition: 2001
- First winner: Stefano Tomasini (ITA)
- Final winner: Fredy González (COL)

The Trofeo dello Scalatore was a single-day road bicycle race held annually in Marche, Italy from 1987 to 2001. The race consisted of a very hilly course designed as a competition for climbing specialists. It consisted of several competitions throughout the race which awarded points, with the race winner being the rider with the most total points.

== Winners ==
Year	Winner	Second	Third
1987	(Italy) Stefano Tomasini	(Italy) Marco Giovannetti	(Italy) Franco Chioccioli
1988	(Italy) Silvano Contini	(Italy) Franco Vona	(Italy) Stefano Tomasini
1989	(Italy) Michele Moro	(Switzerland) Daniel Steiger	(Soviet Union) Piotr Ugrumov
1990	(Italy) Roberto Gusmeroli	(Soviet Union) Piotr Ugrumov	(Italy) Roberto Conti
1991	(Italy) Davide Cassani	(Italy) Stefano Della Santa	(Italy) Michele Moro
1992	(Italy) Alberto Elli	(Italy) Oscar Pellicioli	(Italy) Ivan Gotti
1993	(Switzerland) Pascal Richard	(Italy) Alberto Elli	(Latvia) Piotr Ugrumov
1994	(Poland) Zenon Jaskuła	(Italy) Francesco Casagrande	(Kazakhstan) Andrei Teteriouk
1995	(Italy) Oscar Pellicioli	(Italy) Wladimir Belli	(Italy) Stefano Colagé
1996	(Italy) Marco Fincato	(Italy) Gianluca Valoti	(Italy) Massimo Donati
1997	(Russia) Pavel Tonkov	(Italy) Simone Borgheresi	(Russia) Vladislav Bobrik
1998	(Italy) Massimo Donati	(Italy) Leonardo Piepoli	(Italy) Michele Laddomada
1999	(Italy) Roberto Sgambelluri	(Italy) Mauro Zanetti	(Italy) Massimo Donati
2000	(Italy) Ruggero Borghi	(Italy) Massimiliano Gentili	(Italy) Fortunato Baliani
2001	(Colombia) Fredy González	(Italy) Gianluca Tonetti	(Italy) Ruggero Borghi
