= 2003 La Flèche Wallonne =

Race details
- Dates: 23 April 2003
- Stages: 1
- Distance: 199.5 km (124.0 mi)
- Winning time: 4h 39' 17"

Results
	Winner	Igor Astarloa (ESP)	(Saeco)
	Second	Aitor Osa (ESP)	(iBanesto.com)
	Third	Alexandr Shefer (KAZ)	(Saeco)

The 2003 La Flèche Wallonne was the 67th edition of La Flèche Wallonne cycle race and was held on 23 April 2003. The race started in Charleroi and finished in Huy. The race was won by Igor Astarloa of the Saeco team.

== General classification ==
Final general classification

Rank	Rider	Team	Time
1	Igor Astarloa (ESP)	Saeco	4h 39' 17"
2	Aitor Osa (ESP)	iBanesto.com	+ 16"
3	Alexandr Shefer (KAZ)	Saeco	+ 56"
4	Unai Etxebarria (VEN)	Euskaltel–Euskadi	+ 1' 00"
5	Alexandr Kolobnev (RUS)	De Nardi–Colpack	+ 1' 06"
6	Oscar Mason (ITA)	Vini Caldirola–So.di	+ 1' 08"
7	Cristian Moreni (ITA)	Alessio	+ 1' 13"
8	Ángel Castresana (ESP)	ONCE–Eroski	+ 1' 15"
9	Christophe Moreau (FRA)	Crédit Agricole	+ 1' 19"
10	Eddy Mazzoleni (ITA)	Vini Caldirola–So.di	+ 1' 19"
