= Oscar Mason (cyclist) =

Italian cyclist

Personal information
- Born: 25 May 1975 (age 51) Varese, Italy

Cycling career
- Sport: Cycling
- Current team: Retired
- Discipline: Road
- Role: Rider

Professional teams
- 1998–1999: Brescialat–Liquigas
- 2000–2001: Mercatone Uno–Albacom
- 2002: Saeco–Longoni Sport
- 2003–2004: Vini Caldirola–So.di
- 2005: Liquigas–Bianchi

Oscar Mason (born 25 May 1975 in Varese) is an Italian former racing cyclist, who competed as a professional from 1998 to 2005.

== Major results ==
1996
3rd Girobio
3rd Triptyque Ardennais
1997
1st Road race, National Under-23 Road Championships
1st Overall Girobio
1st Gran Premio Palio del Recioto
1st Stages 1 & 4 Triptyque Ardennais
1998
6th GP Industria Artigianato e Commercio Carnaghese
1999
5th GP Industria & Artigianato di Larciano
5th Giro di Toscana
2000
3rd Trofeo Melinda
4th Giro del Veneto
5th Klasika Primavera
7th Giro del Lazio
7th Giro dell'Appennino
9th Overall Tour de Suisse
2001
8th Giro della Provincia di Siracusa
2002
7th GP Llodio
2003
1st Overall Giro d'Abruzzo
3rd Coppa Agostoni
6th La Flèche Wallonne
6th Trofeo Pantalica
7th Giro della Provincia di Reggio Calabria
2004
5th Giro di Toscana

=== Grand Tour general classification results timeline ===
Grand Tour	1998	1999	2000	2001	2002	2003	2004	2005
Giro d'Italia	DNF	25	—	—	56	DNF	30	—
Tour de France	—	—	—	—	—	—	—	—
Vuelta a España	—	—	—	—	—	DNF	—	DNF

Legend
DNF	Did not finish
