= Mauro Zinetti =

Italian former road cyclist (born 1975)

Personal information
- Born: 26 June 1975 (age 51) Gazzaniga, Itay

Cycling career
- Sport: Cycling
- Discipline: Road
- Role: Rider

Amateur teams
- 1996: L'Edile–Ok Baby Gaverina–Futura 95
- 1997: Colpack–Polti
- 1997: Team Polti (stagiaire)

Professional teams
- 1998–1999: Team Polti
- 2000: Team Colpack
- 2001–2002: Alexia Alluminio
- 2003: Amore & Vita–Beretta
- 2004: Vini Caldirola–Nobili Rubinetterie

Mauro Zinetti (born 26 June 1975) is an Italian former road cyclist, who was professional from 1998 to 2004.

== Major results ==
1997
1st Trofeo Alcide Degasperi
1st Trofeo Papà Cervi
3rd Overall Tour de Hokkaido

1st Stage 4

1998
1st La Côte Picarde
1999
1st Stage 3 Regio-Tour
1st Stage 6 Hessen Rundfahrt
2000
3rd G.P. Costa degli Etruschi
9th Giro di Romagna
2002
4th Grand Prix Pino Cerami
7th Scheldeprijs
2003
1st Stage 1 Course Cycliste de Solidarnosc et des Champions Olympiques
2004
2nd Giro della Provincia di Reggio Calabria
6th GP Chiasso
