= 2000 Tour de Suisse =

Race details
- Dates: 13–22 June 2000
- Stages: 10
- Distance: 1,358 km (844 mi)
- Winning time: 34h 01' 05"

Results
	Winner	Oscar Camenzind (SUI)	(Lampre–Daikin)
	Second	Dario Frigo (ITA)	(Fassa Bortolo)
	Third	Wladimir Belli (ITA)	(Fassa Bortolo)

The 2000 Tour de Suisse was the 64th edition of the Tour de Suisse cycle race and was held from 13 June to 22 June 2000. The race started in Romanshorn and finished in Zürich. The race was won by Oscar Camenzind of the Lampre team.

== Teams ==
Seventeen teams of eight riders started the race:

- Vini Caldirola–Sidermec
- Mapei–Quick-Step
- Team Telekom
- Rabobank
- Lampre–Daikin
- Fassa Bortolo
- Cofidis
- Saeco–Valli & Valli
- Lotto–Adecco
- Liquigas–Pata
- Française des Jeux
- Mercatone Uno–Albacom
- Team Polti
- Phonak
- Post Swiss Team
- Gerolsteiner
- Manheim Auctions–Mercury

== Route ==
Stage characteristics and winners
Stage	Date	Course	Distance	Type	Winner	Leader
1	13 June	Uster to Uster	24 km (14.9 mi)	Team time trial	Team Telekom	Steffen Wesemann (Germany)
2	14 June	Uster to Rheinfelden	197 km (122.4 mi)		Fred Rodriguez (USA)	Markus Zberg (Switzerland)
3	15 June	Rheinfelden to Fribourg	182 km (113.1 mi)		Wladimir Belli (ITA)	Michael Boogerd (Netherlands)
4	16 June	Fribourg to Verbier	156 km (96.9 mi)		Pascal Hervé (FRA)	Pascal Hervé (France)
5	17 June	Sierre to Sierre	30 km (18.6 mi)	Individual time trial	Raivis Belohvoščiks (LAT)	Jan Ullrich (Germany)
6	18 June	Ulrichen to Ulrichen	103 km (64 mi)		Eddy Mazzoleni (ITA)	Jan Ullrich (Germany)
7	19 June	Locarno to Lugano	171 km (106.3 mi)		Marco Fincato (ITA)	Jan Ullrich (Germany)
8	20 June	Locarno to La Punt	170 km (105.6 mi)		Stefano Garzelli (ITA)	Oscar Camenzind (Switzerland)
9	21 June	St. Moritz to Arosa	150 km (93.2 mi)		Francesco Secchiari (ITA)	Oscar Camenzind (Switzerland)
10	22 June	Herisau to Baden	175 km (108.7 mi)		Stefano Zanini (ITA)	Oscar Camenzind (Switzerland)

== General classification ==
Final general classification

Rank	Rider	Team	Time
1	Oscar Camenzind (SUI)	Lampre–Daikin	34h 01' 05"
2	Dario Frigo (ITA)	Fassa Bortolo	+ 14"
3	Wladimir Belli (ITA)	Fassa Bortolo	+ 26"
4	Sven Montgomery (SUI)	Française des Jeux	+ 1' 42"
5	Jan Ullrich (GER)	Team Telekom	+ 2' 07"
6	Richard Virenque (FRA)	Team Polti	+ 2' 22"
7	Daniele Nardello (ITA)	Mapei–Quick-Step	+ 2' 40"
8	Michael Boogerd (NED)	Rabobank	+ 5' 13"
9	Oscar Mason (ITA)	Mercatone Uno–Albacom	+ 6' 21"
10	Daniel Atienza (ESP)	Saeco–Valli & Valli	+ 6' 40"
