= Roberto Sgambelluri =

Italian cyclist

Personal information
- Born: 6 April 1974 (age 52) Melito di Porto Salvo, Italy
- Height: 1.75 m (5 ft 9 in)
- Weight: 63 kg (139 lb)

Cycling career
- Sport: Cycling
- Current team: Retired
- Discipline: Road
- Role: Rider

Amateur teams
- 1993–1994: VC Casano
- 1995: Brunero Bongioanni Boeris
- 1996: UC Trevigiani
- 2005: Clubmagnagrecia

Professional teams
- 1997–1998: Brescialat–Oyster
- 1999–2000: Cantina Tollo–Alexia Alluminio
- 2001: Team Telekom
- 2002: Mercatone Uno
- 2004: Vini Caldirola–Nobili Rubinetterie

Roberto Sgambelluri (born 6 April 1974) is an Italian former professional racing cyclist. He rode in six editions of the Giro d'Italia.

== Major results ==
1996
1st Overall Giro Ciclistico d'Italia

1st Stage 7

UCI Under-23 Road World Championships

2nd Time trial
2nd Road race

6th Overall GP Tell
1997
1st Stage 6 Giro d'Italia
1999
4th Trofeo dello Scalatore
5th Overall Giro del Trentino
7th Overall Tour de Suisse
8th Coppa Placci
8th Giro dell'Emilia
10th Overall Giro d'Italia
10th Giro di Toscana
2000
6th Overall Giro del Trentino
7th GP Industria & Artigianato di Larciano
8th Overall Volta a Catalunya
2001
4th Trofeo Matteotti
2004
4th Coppa Agostoni
6th GP Industria Artigianato e Commercio Carnaghese
10th Giro d'Oro

=== Grand Tour general classification results timeline ===
Grand Tour	1997	1998	1999	2000	2001	2002	2003	2004
Giro d'Italia	32	19	10	33	33	DNF	—	—
Tour de France	—	—	—	—	—	—	—	—
Vuelta a España	DNF	37	—	37	63	—	—	79

Legend
—	Did not compete
DNF	Did not finish
