= Leonardo Giordani =

Italian cyclist (born 1977)

Personal information
- Born: 27 May 1977 (age 49) Rome, Italy
- Height: 1.90 m (6 ft 3 in)
- Weight: 68 kg (150 lb)

Cycling career
- Sport: Cycling
- Current team: Retired
- Discipline: Road
- Role: Rider

Amateur teams
- 1997: Giusti Vellutex Vigorplant–Casini Micco
- 1998: Casini–Vellutex
- 1999: Vellutex

Professional teams
- 2000–2001: Fassa Bortolo
- 2002: Team Colpack–Astro
- 2003–2004: De Nardi–Pasta Montegrappa
- 2005: Team Universal Caffé–Styloffice
- 2006–2007: Naturino–Sapore di Mare
- 2008–2010: Ceramica Flaminia–Bossini Docce
- 2011–2013: Farnese Vini–Neri Sottoli

Leonardo Giordani (born 27 May 1977) is an Italian former racing cyclist, who competed as a professional from 2000 to 2013. He most notably won the under-23 road race at the 1999 UCI Road World Championships.

== Major results ==
1995
2nd Trofeo Buffoni
1997
1st Gran Premio Chianti Colline d'Elsa
1st Stages 2 (TTT & 4 Giro della Valle d'Aosta
2nd Gran Premio di Poggiana
1998
1st Piccolo Giro di Lombardia
1st Gran Premio Chianti Colline d'Elsa
2nd Overall Giro della Valle d'Aosta

1st Stage 2

2nd Piccola Sanremo
1999
1st Road race, UCI Under-23 Road World Championships
1st Overall Giro delle Regioni

1st Stage 3

1st Trofeo Gianfranco Bianchin
2002
7th Giro dell'Emilia
10th Giro del Lazio
2003
9th Overall Brixia Tour
2005
2nd Coppa Agostoni
6th GP Città di Camaiore
6th Trofeo Matteotti
2006
6th Rund um Köln
2008
4th Firenze–Pistoia
5th Overall Giro della Provincia di Grosseto
5th Giro del Veneto
5th Memorial Marco Pantani
9th Overall GP CTT Correios de Portugal
2010
7th Coppa Agostoni

=== Grand Tour general classification results timeline ===
Grand Tour	2002	2003	2004	2005	2006	2007	2008	2009	2010	2011
Giro d'Italia	DNF	90	75	—	—	—	—	—	—	114
Tour de France	—	—	—	—	—	—	—	—	—	—
Vuelta a España	—	—	—	—	—	—	—	—	—	—

Legend
—	Did not compete
DNF	Did not finish
