= Christian Murro =

Italian cyclist

Personal information
- Full name: Christian Murro
- Born: 19 May 1978 (age 48) Saronno, Italy

Cycling career
- Sport: Cycling
- Discipline: Road
- Role: Rider

Professional teams
- 2004: Miche
- 2005–2007: Tenax
- 2008: Lampre-Fondital

Christian Murro (born 19 May 1978, in Saronno) is an Italian road bicycle racer.

== Palmares ==
2004
1st, Gran Premio Industria e Commercio Artigianato Carnaghese
2006
1st, Ruddervoorde
2007
1st, Tre Valli Varesine
