= Giosuè Bonomi =

Italian former road racing cyclist (born 1978)

Personal information
- Full name: Giosuè Bonomi
- Born: 21 October 1978 (age 47) Gazzaniga, Italy

Cycling career
- Sport: Cycling
- Discipline: Road
- Role: Rider

Professional teams
- 2000: Team Polti (stagiaire)
- 2001–2002: Team Colpack–Astro
- 2003–2004: Saeco
- 2005: Lampre–Caffita
- 2006–2007: Team Barloworld

Giosuè Bonomi (born 21 October 1978) is an Italian former road racing cyclist. After appearing as a stagiaire with Team Polti in 2000, he rode for Team Colpack–Astro, Saeco, Lampre–Caffita and Team Barloworld between 2001 and 2007.

== Career ==
Bonomi was born in Gazzaniga, in the Province of Bergamo. In 2004, while riding for Saeco, he finished third in the Coppa Bernocchi in Legnano; the race was won by Angelo Furlan ahead of Fred Rodriguez.

He rode for Lampre–Caffita in 2005 and moved to Team Barloworld for the 2006 season. Cyclingnews described him at the time as a 27-year-old Italian professional entering his sixth season in the professional peloton. During the 2006 GP Internacional Costa Azul, Bonomi was third on stage 2 behind teammate Enrico Degano and Robbie McEwen, and was third overall after the stage. He finished third overall in the race.

Later in 2006, Bonomi finished second in the Coppa Bernocchi behind Danilo Napolitano and ahead of Luca Paolini. Ahead of the 2007 season, Radsport-News listed him among Barloworld's group of fast finishers, alongside Degano, Robert Hunter and Fabrizio Guidi.

In 2019, Sanremonews reported that Bonomi was coaching the newly formed U.C. Imperia Raineri youth cycling team.

== Major results ==
2004

- 3rd Coppa Bernocchi

2006

- 2nd Coppa Bernocchi
- 3rd Overall GP Costa Azul
