= Oscar Cavagnis =

Italian cyclist (1974–2021)

Personal information
- Born: 12 December 1974 Bergamo, Italy
- Died: 19 May 2021 (aged 46) Königspitze

Cycling career
- Sport: Cycling
- Discipline: Road
- Role: Rider

Amateur teams
- 1994: Ecoclear Sumirago
- 1996: Casini Saeco–Vigorplant Vellutex
- 1997: San Pellegrino–Bottoli–Artoni

Professional teams
- 1998–1999: Cantina Tollo–Alexia Alluminio
- 2000: Alexia Alluminio
- 2001: Saeco
- 2002: Landbouwkrediet–Colnago

Oscar Cavagnis (12 December 1974 – 19 May 2021) was an Italian cyclist. He competed professionally from 1998 to 2002 and rode in the 2002 Giro d'Italia.

Cavagnis died on 19 May 2021, aged 46, from an avalanche on the Königspitze.

== Major results ==
1996
1st Prologue (TTT) Giro delle Regioni
2nd Gran Premio di Poggiana
1997
1st GP Industrie del Marmo
1st Stage 5 Giro d'Abruzzo
2nd Overall Giro del Ticino

1st Stage 2

2nd Overall Tour de Nouvelle-Calédonie
5th Gran Premio della Liberazione
1998
1st Stages 5 & 9 Peace Race
2000
1st Stage 1 Settimana Internazionale Coppi e Bartali
2nd Giro di Campania
3rd Route Adélie
5th Classic Haribo
2002
2nd Poreč Trophy 3
6th Trofeo dell'Etna
8th Grand Prix d'Ouverture La Marseillaise
