= Addy Engels =

Dutch cyclist

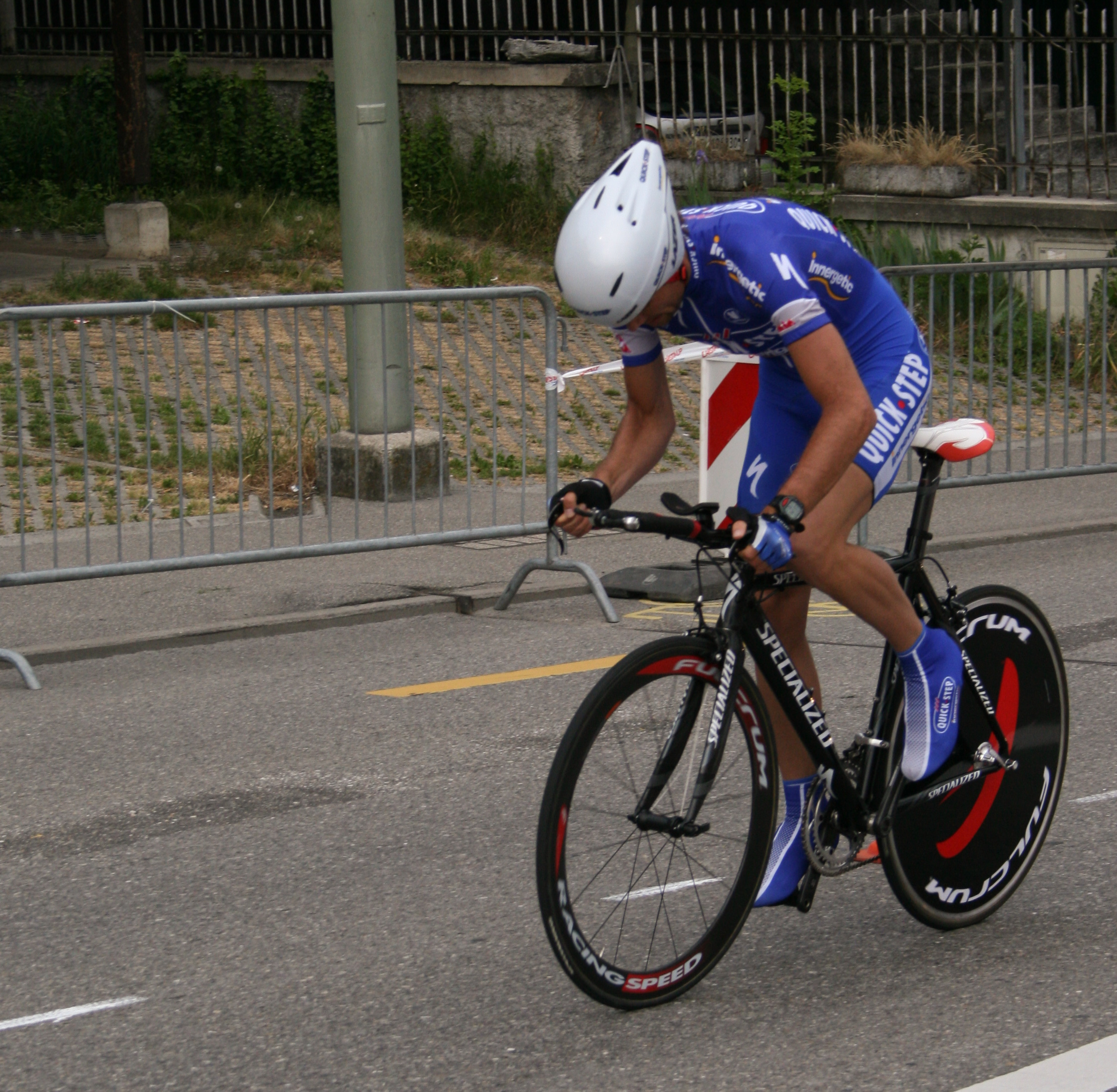
- Engels during the 2007 Tour de Romandie

Personal information
- Full name: Addy Engels
- Born: 16 June 1977 (age 49) Emmen, the Netherlands
- Height: 1.81 m (5 ft 11 in)
- Weight: 64 kg (141 lb)

Cycling career
- Sport: Cycling
- Current team: Visma–Lease a Bike
- Discipline: Road
- Role: Rider (retired); Sports director

Professional teams
- 2000–2003: Rabobank
- 2004: BankGiroLoterij
- 2005–2011: Quick-Step–Innergetic

Managerial teams
- 2012–2015: Project 1t4i
- 2016–: LottoNL–Jumbo

Addy Engels (born 16 June 1977 in Emmen, Drenthe) is a former Dutch professional road bicycle racer, who competed between 2000 and 2011. After retiring, Engels joined the Team Picnic–PostNL team as a sports director. At the end of 2015 it was announced that he would make the switch to LottoNL–Jumbo.

== Major results ==
1998
1st U23 Road Race championships
1999
2nd U23 Road Race championships
5th Overall Le Triptyque des Monts et Châteaux
2000
2nd DAB Classic Dortmund
2004
8th Overall Rheinland-Pfalz Rundfahrt
2007
9th Overall Ster Elektrotoer

=== Grand Tour general classification results timeline ===
Grand Tour	2000	2001	2002	2003	2004	2005	2006	2007	2008	2009	2010	2011
Giro d'Italia	80	—	24	—	—	69	84	81	105	112	126	110
Tour de France	—	—	94	—	—	—	—	—	—	—	—	146
Vuelta a España	—	84	—	114	—	—	124	83	—	—	—	—
