= Mauro Zanetti =

Italian cyclist

Personal information
- Born: 5 April 1973 (age 53) Iseo, Italy

Cycling career
- Sport: Cycling
- Current team: Retired
- Discipline: Road
- Role: Rider

Professional teams
- 1997: Aki–Safi
- 1998–2000: Vini Caldirola
- 2001–2002: Alessio
- 2003: Tenax

Mauro Zanetti (born 5 April 1973) is an Italian former cyclist. He rode in six editions of the Giro d'Italia and two editions of the Vuelta a España.

== Major results ==
1996
1st Stage 2 Giro del Friuli Venezia Giulia
1st Cronoscalata Gardone Val Trompia-Prati di Caregno
2nd Overall Giro della Valle d'Aosta

1st Stage 6

1998
1st Coppa Placci
1999
3rd Coppa Sabatini
2000
1st Giro dell'Appennino
