= Hidenori Nodera =

Japanese professional cyclist

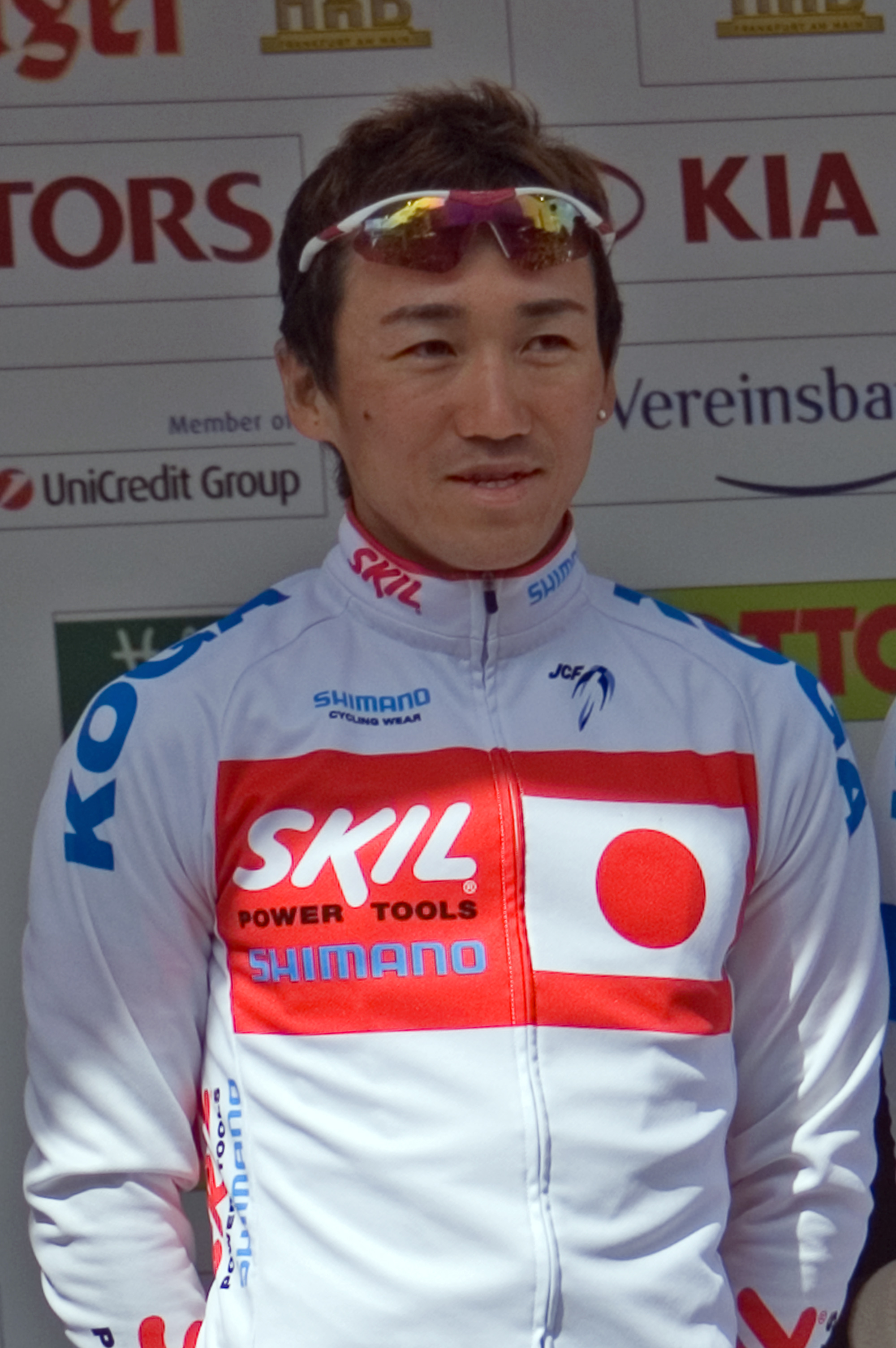

Personal information
- Full name: Hidenori Nodera; Japanese: 野寺秀徳
- Born: June 7, 1975 (age 51) Japan
- Height: 1.66 m (5 ft 5 1/2 in)
- Weight: 58 kg (128 lb; 9.1 st)

Cycling career
- Sport: Cycling
- Current team: Shimano Racing Team
- Discipline: Road
- Role: Rider (retired); Directeur sportif

Professional teams
- 1998–2000: Shimano Racing
- 2001–2002: Team Colpack–Astro
- 2003–2004: Shimano Racing
- 2005–2008: Shimano–Memory Corp
- 2009–2010: Shimano Racing Team

Managerial team
- 2010–: Shimano Racing Team

Major wins
- National Road Race Championships (2005, 2008)

Hidenori Nodera (野寺秀徳, Nodera Hidenori; born June 7, 1975) is a Japanese former professional racing cyclist, who currently works as a directeur sportif for UCI Continental team Shimano Racing Team.

== Career ==
Born in Izu, Shizuoka Prefecture, Nodera graduated from Hosei University and became a professional in 1998 with Shimano Racing, the team operated by Shimano. He joined the Italian team Colpack–Astro in 2001 and became only the second Japanese to complete the Giro d'Italia, after Masatoshi Ichikawa in 1990. Returning to Shimano, he continued to ride in both Europe and Asia, becoming Japanese national champion in 2005 and 2008. He retired in 2010, finishing third in his last race, the Japanese National Road Race Championships. With that result, he finished on the podium for eight straight years in the national championship. He then became the team manager for Shimano Racing Team.

== Major results ==
2003
1st Overall Jelajah Malaysia
2nd Road race, National Road Championships
2004
3rd Road race, National Road Championships
2005
1st Road race, National Road Championships
2006
2nd Road race, National Road Championships
2007
2nd Road race, National Road Championships
2008
1st Road race, National Road Championships
2009
1st Challenge Cycle Road Race
3rd Road race, National Road Championships
2010
3rd Road race, National Road Championships

=== Grand Tour general classification results timeline ===
Grand Tour	2001	2002
Giro d'Italia	DNF	139
Tour de France	—	—
Vuelta a España	—	—

Legend
DSQ	Disqualified
DNF	Did not finish
