= Francesco Secchiari =

Italian cyclist

Personal information
- Born: August 24, 1972 (age 54) Fivizzano, Italy

Cycling career
- Sport: Cycling
- Current team: Retired
- Discipline: Road
- Role: Rider

Professional teams
- 1995–1998: Navigare–Blue Storm
- 1999–2001: Saeco–Cannondale
- 2002: Mercatone Uno
- 2003–2004: Domina Vacanze–Elitron

Francesco Secchiari (born 24 August 1972 in Fivizzano) is an Italian former racing cyclist, who competed as a professional from 1995 to 2004. He competed in 9 editions of the Giro d'Italia, 2 of the Tour de France, and 2 of the Vuelta a España.

== Major results ==
1993
1st Coppa Città di Asti
1994
3rd Overall Girobio
3rd Overall Giro d'Abruzzo
1995
1st Stage 3 Volta a Portugal
1997
1st Gran Premio Industria e Commercio Artigianato Carnaghese
1st Stages 4 & 7 Volta a Portugal
1998
1st Overall Giro d'Abruzzo

1st Stages 2 & 3 (TTT)

1st Giro di Toscana
2000
1st Stage 9 Tour de Suisse

=== Grand Tour general classification results timeline ===
Grand Tour	1995	1996	1997	1998	1999	2000	2001	2002	2003	2004
Giro d'Italia	66	DNF	DNF	24	27	59	48	DNF	95	—
Tour de France	—	—	—	—	DNF	—	—	—	—	143
Vuelta a España	—	—	—	—	—	DNF	—	—	DNF	—

Legend
DNF	Did not finish
