= Gran Premio Industria e Commercio Artigianato Carnaghese =

Bicycle race in Carnago, Italy

Race details
- Date: August
- Region: Varese, Italy
- Local name: Gran Premio Industria e Commercio Artigianato Carnaghese (in Italian)
- Discipline: Road
- Competition: UCI Europe Tour (until 2012)
- Type: Single-day
- Organiser: Societa Ciclistica Carnaghese
- Web site: www.sccarnaghese.it/index.htm

History
- First edition: 1972
- Editions: 42 (as of 2013)
- First winner: A. Spampinato (ITA)
- Most wins: Francesco Ginanni (ITA) (2 wins)
- Most recent: Marco Prodigioso (ITA)

The Gran Premio Industria e Commercio Artigianato Carnaghese is a single-day road bicycle race held annually in Carnago, Italy. From 2005 to 2012, the race was organised as a 1.1 event on the UCI Europe Tour. Since 2013, it's held as an amateur event.

== Winners ==
Year	Country	Rider	Team
1972	Italy	A. Spampinato	
1973	Italy	A. Gasparri	
1974	Italy	A. Almasio	
1975	Italy	Fausto Stitz	
1976	Italy	Gabriele Mirri	
1977	Italy	M. Magliarisi	
1978	Italy	Walter Clivati	
1979	Italy	Giancarlo Perini	
1980	Italy	Giuseppe Parente	
1981	Italy	Patrizio Gambirasio	
1982	Italy	G. Cretti	
1983	Italy	M. Ghirardi	
1984	Switzerland	Remo Gugole	
1985	Italy	Mauro Ricciutelli	
1986	Italy	Davide Maddalena	
1987	Italy	Luca Cantù	
1988	Italy	Eros Poli	
1989	Italy	Alberto Passera	
1990	Italy	Simone Biasci	
1991	Italy	Mirko Gualdi	
1992	Italy	Enrico Pezzetti	
1993	Italy	Luca Scinto	
1994	Italy	Filippo Casagrande	
1995	Italy	Giuseppe Tartaggia	
1996	Italy	Oscar Pozzi	
1997	Italy	Francesco Secchiari	Scrigno–Gaerne
1998	Italy	Giampaolo Mondini	Kross–Selle Italia
1999	Italy	Mirko Puglioli	Amore & Vita–Giubileo 2000–Beretta
2000	Italy	Denis Lunghi	Team Colpack
2001	Uzbekistan	Rafael Nuritdinov	Team Colpack-Astro
2002	Italy	Paolo Bossoni	Tacconi Sport
2003	Italy	Michele Gobbi	De Nardi-Colpack
2004	Italy	Christian Murro	Miche
2005	Australia	Simon Gerrans	AG2R Prévoyance
2006	Colombia	Félix Cárdenas	Barloworld
2007	France	Aurélien Passeron	Acqua & Sapone–Caffè Mokambo
2008	Italy	Francesco Ginanni	Diquigiovanni–Androni
2009	Italy	Francesco Ginanni	Diquigiovanni–Androni
2010	Italy	Ivan Basso	Liquigas–Doimo
2011	Italy	Giovanni Visconti	Farnese Vini–Neri Sottoli
2012	Italy	Diego Ulissi	Lampre–ISD
2013	Italy	Marco Prodigioso	Monviso Venezia
2014	Italy	Marco Tizza	M.I. Impianti Remer Guerciotti
