= Michele Gobbi =

Italian cyclist

Personal information
- Born: August 10, 1977 (age 49) Vicenza, Italy

Cycling career
- Sport: Cycling
- Current team: Retired
- Discipline: Road
- Role: Rider

Amateur team
- 2009: FWR Bata Ciclismo

Professional teams
- 2000-2001: Mobilvetta
- 2001-2005: De Nardi
- 2006: Team Milram
- 2008: Preti Mangimi

Michele Gobbi (born August 10, 1977 in Vicenza) is a former Italian cyclist.

== Palmares ==
1998
1st Coppa Collecchio
2nd Giro del Canavese
1999
1st European Road Race Champion
2002
3rd Gran Premio Industria e Commercio Artigianato Carnaghese
2003
1st stage 4 Giro del Trentino
1st Gran Premio Industria e Commercio Artigianato Carnaghese
1st Trofeo Città di Castelfidardo
2004
1st Giro del Friuli
