= San Giacomo, Valle Castellana =

Coordinates: 42°47′58″N 13°33′37″E

Location in Italy

San Giacomo is a mountain village in the Province of Teramo in the Abruzzo region of Italy. It is a frazione of the comune of Valle Castellana.

== Geography ==
San Giacomo lies at an altitude of 1105 m, within the Gran Sasso e Monti della Laga National Park. The town takes its name from the presence of an ancient building, belonging to the monastery of San Giacomo, which once sat at a slightly lower elevation. This building served as a refuge for workers who once tilled the landholdings in the area that belonged to the church. One ridge in this area still carries the name Costa del prevosto (Ridge of the Provost) in reference to this fact.

== Borders ==
San Giacomo is situated on the border of the Italian regions of Abruzzo and Marche. Prior to the formation of the united Italy in 1861, this land served at the point of demarcation between the Kingdom of Two Sicilies and the Vatican State.

One marker stone dated 1847 identifies a boundary, probably first delineated by Ruggiero II in the twelfth century, dividing the holdings of the leaders of Rome with those of the Neapolitans. The remains of several customs checkpoints have also been unearthed nearby. At one point they likely served to control the passage of contraband between these two rival states. These checkpoints in turn were likely built on the remains of a still older Catholic hermitage. German soldiers made use of this area in the latter part of World War II as they fought their losing battles against the local Italian partisan forces.

This mountain area is particularly suited to excursionists who wish to hike the many mountain trails. Some wind down to Colle San Marco while others lead up to an area known as Montagna dei Fiori.

== Sports ==
=== Downhill Skiing ===
San Giacomo has one of the three recreational downhill skiing slopes in the province of Teramo, the other two being Prati di Tivo e Prato Selva. In addition to skiing, the village offers an assortment of other entertainment venues including hotels, bars, and restaurants. The base of the ski lifts is located at Monte Piselli, in the past well known for the cultivation of garden peas. On 2 September 1964 a cable car connecting San Giacomo with the ski lifts of Monte Piselli, was put into operation. It eventually reached the end of its useful service and was later dismantled. The trip is now typically made by car or bus.

=== Cycling ===
- On 25 May 2002 the thirteenth stage of the Giro d'Italia, won by the Mexican Julio Perez Cuapio, passed through this area.
- On 19 March 2007 a portion of the 6th stage of the Tirreno–Adriatico bike race, won by Matteo Bono, took place in San Giacomo.
- Several stages of the Trofeo dello Scalatore race have also been held in this location.

== Pastures ==
The area surrounding San Giocaomo was once used primarily for sheep grazing, and three shelters known as "caciare" still stand. They were built of dry stone walls, without the use of mortar, and are reminiscent of the famous trulli in the Italian region of Apulia. The caciare not only served as shelter for the shepherds but were also used to protect young lambs from predators and for the storage of the locally produced cheeses made from sheep's milk.

== See also ==
- Monti della Laga

== Notes and references ==
- Antonella Alesi, Da Ascoli alla Montagna dei Fiori, Società editrice sas, Folignano (Ap), 2005. (in Italian)
