= Francisco León Mane =

Spanish cyclist

Personal information
- Born: 22 May 1973 (age 53)

Cycling career
- Sport: Cycling
- Role: Rider

Francisco León Mane (born 22 May 1973) is a Spanish racing cyclist. He rode in the 2000 Tour de France.
