= Rafael Mateos =

Spanish cyclist

Personal information
- Born: 23 February 1976 (age 50)

Cycling career
- Sport: Cycling
- Role: Rider

Rafael Mateos (born 23 February 1976) is a Spanish racing cyclist. He rode in the 2000 Tour de France.
