= Dario Andriotto =

Italian cyclist

Personal information
- Born: 25 October 1972 (age 53) Busto Arsizio, Italy

Cycling career
- Sport: Cycling
- Current team: Retired
- Discipline: Road
- Role: Rider

Professional teams
- 1995-1998: Amore & Vita
- 1999: Saeco
- 2000-2002: Index-Alexia Alluminio
- 2003-2004: Vini Caldirola
- 2005-2006: Liquigas-Bianchi
- 2007-2010: Acqua & Sapone

Dario Andriotto (born 25 October 1972) is a former Italian cyclist. He rode in one Tour de France, 4 editions of the Vuelta a España and 12 editions of the Giro d'Italia.

== Major results ==
1995
1st Grand Prix d'Europe (with Vitali Kokorin)
1996
3rd Grand Prix d'Europe (with Vitali Kokorin)
1997
National Time Trial Champion
1st Gran Premio Nobili Rubinetterie
1st Grand Prix d'Europe (with Cristian Salvato)
1st stage 8 Tour de Pologne
2nd Tre Valli Varesine
2000
1st Grand Prix d'Europe (with Sergiy Matveyev)
2001
2nd Coppa Bernocchi
3rd Memorial Fausto Coppi
