= Christophe Detilloux =

Belgian cyclist

Personal information
- Full name: Christophe Detilloux
- Born: 3 May 1974 (age 52) Rocourt, Belgium
- Height: 1.70 m (5 ft 7 in)
- Weight: 62 kg (137 lb)

Cycling career
- Sport: Cycling
- Current team: Wagner Bazin WB; Bingoal WB Devo Team
- Discipline: Road
- Role: Rider (retired); Directeur sportif

Professional teams
- 1996–2000: Lotto
- 2001: Collstrop–Palmans
- 2002–2004: Lotto–Adecco
- 2005–2007: Française des Jeux

Managerial teams
- 2012–: Idemasport–Biowanze
- 2019–: Wallonie Bruxelles

Christophe Detilloux (born 3 May 1974 in Rocourt) is a Belgian former professional road bicycle racer, who currently works as a directeur sportif for UCI ProTeam Wagner Bazin WB and its junior team, UCI Continental team Bingoal WB Devo Team.

== Major results ==
1994
3rd Internatie Reningelst
1995
3rd Zellik–Galmaarden
1997
1st Boucle de l'Artois
4th GP de la Ville de Rennes
1999
2nd Druivenkoers Overijse
2nd Schaal Sels
2000
8th Kampioenschap van Vlaanderen
2002
4th Tour de Vendée
8th Kampioenschap van Vlaanderen
