= Domenico Gualdi =

Italian cyclist

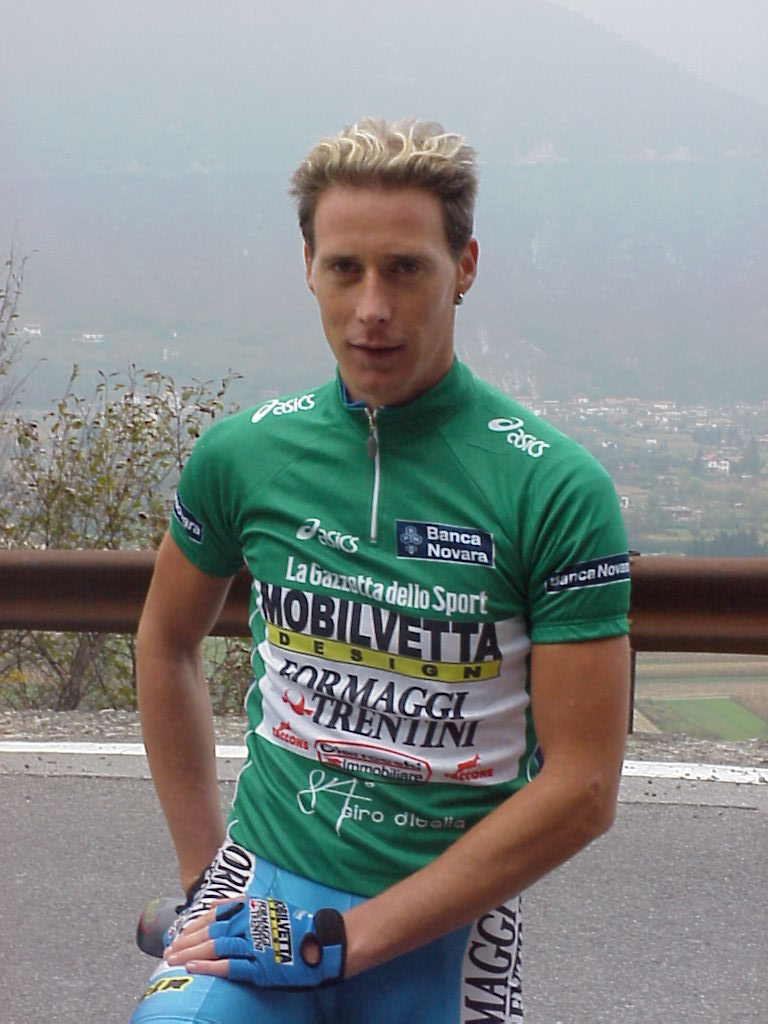
- Domenico Gualdi

Personal information
- Born: 30 April 1974 (age 52) Tione di Trento, Italy

Cycling career
- Sport: Cycling
- Role: Rider

Domenico Gualdi (born 30 April 1974) is an Italian former professional racing cyclist. He rode in three editions of the Giro d'Italia.
