= Ief Verbrugghe =

Belgian cyclist

Personal information
- Born: 25 July 1975 (age 51) Tienen, Belgium

Cycling career
- Sport: Cycling
- Current team: Retired
- Discipline: Road
- Role: Rider

Amateur team
- 2000: Lotto–Adecco (stagiaire)

Professional team
- 2001–2004: Lotto–Adecco

Ief Verbrugghe (born 25 July 1975 in Tienen) is a Belgian former professional cyclist. He rode his entire career on the Lotto–Domo team, and rode in four editions of the Giro d'Italia. He did not achieve any professional wins.

He is the younger brother of former cyclist Rik Verbrugghe.

== Major results ==
1999
3rd Cholet-Pays de Loire
