= Ruggero Borghi =

Italian cyclist

Personal information
- Full name: Ruggero Borghi
- Born: 13 June 1970 (age 56) Cantù, Italy

Cycling career
- Sport: Cycling
- Discipline: Road
- Role: Rider

Professional teams
- 1995, 2003: Mercatone Uno
- 1996: Saeco-AS Juvenes San Marino
- 1998–2000: Vini Caldirola
- 2001–2002: Tacconi Sport
- 2004: De Nardi
- 2005: Domina Vacanze
- 2006: LPR

Ruggero Borghi (born 13 June 1970 in Cantù) is a former Italian professional road bicycle racer who rode for UCI ProTeam Domina Vacanze in 2005.

== Palmares ==
1994
2nd Overall Giro Ciclistico d'Italia
1998
8th Trofeo Matteotti
2000
1st Overall Trofeo dello Scalatore

3rd Parts 1 & 2

3rd Wartenberg Rundfahrt
2001
1st Trofeo dello Scalatore
3rd Giro di Romagna
5th GP Industria & Commercio di Prato
2002
5th Gran Premio di Lugano
5th GP Industria Artigianato e Commercio Carnaghese
10th Giro di Toscana
2003
7th Giro del Lazio
7th GP Industria & Commercio di Prato
8th Coppa Sabatini
9th Overall Ster Elektrotoer
2004
3rd GP Industria & Artigianato Larciano
5th GP Nobili Rubinetterie
6th Giro di Toscana
7th Trofeo Melinda
9th Coppa Sabatini
10th Giro del Friuli
