= Denis Lunghi =

Italian cyclist

Personal information
- Born: 21 January 1976 (age 50) Biella, Italy

Cycling career
- Sport: Cycling
- Role: Rider

Amateur team
- 1998: Team Polti (stagiaire)

Professional teams
- 1999: Team Polti
- 2000–2002: Team Colpack
- 2003–2004: Alessio

Major wins
- Grand Tours Giro d'Italia 1 individual stage (2002) One-day races and Classics GP Industria Artigianato e Commercio Carnaghese (2000) Giro del Friuli (2001)

Denis Lunghi (born 21 January 1976) is an Italian former professional racing cyclist. He rode in three editions of the Giro d'Italia.

== Major results ==
1998
2nd GP Palio del Recioto
3rd GP di Poggiana
7th Overall Giro Ciclistico d'Italia

1st Stage 1

1999
2nd Overall Tour of Japan
2000
1st GP Industria Artigianato e Commercio Carnaghese
2nd Coppa Agostoni
5th Giro di Toscana
6th Trofeo Melinda
8th Overall Peace Race
2001
1st Giro del Friuli
3rd Coppa Bernocchi
3rd Trofeo dello Scalatore
6th Trofeo Laigueglia
6th Giro di Romagna
8th Gran Premio della Costa Etruschi
9th Giro del Veneto
9th GP Industria & Commercio di Prato
2002
1st Stage 12 Giro d'Italia
6th Stausee Rundfahrt
6th GP Industria Artigianato e Commercio Carnaghese
2003
1st Stage 6 Tour of Qinghai Lake
8th Brixia Tour
