= Team Colpack–Astro =

Team Colpack-Astro
Team information
- UCI code: CPK
- Registered: Italy
- Founded: 2000
- Disbanded: 2002
- Discipline: Road
- Status: Division II

Key personnel
- General manager: Gianluigi Stanga
- Team managers: Antonio Bevilacqua; Cristiano Colleoni

Team name history
- 2000 2001–2002: Team Colpack; Team Colpack-Astro

Team Colpack–Astro was an Italian professional cycling team. The team merged with De Nardi in 2003.

== Roster ==
=== 2000 ===
Roster in 2000, age as of 1 January 2000:

Rider	Date of birth
Fabio Bulgarelli (ITA)	21 January 1977 (aged 22)
Alessandro Cortinovis (ITA)	11 October 1977 (aged 22)
Valentino Fois (ITA)	23 September 1973 (aged 26)
Gianni Gobbini (ITA)	4 February 1976 (aged 23)
Denis Lunghi (ITA)	21 January 1976 (aged 23)
Miguel Ángel Meza (MEX)	19 May 1977 (aged 22)

Rider	Date of birth
Andrea Nencini (ITA)	22 August 1973 (aged 26)
Massimiliano Razzari (ITA)	7 January 1973 (aged 26)
Moris Sammassimo (ITA)	19 November 1976 (aged 23)
Ruggiero Torraco (ITA)	11 January 1975 (aged 24)
Gianluca Valoti (ITA)	16 February 1973 (aged 26)
Mauro Zinetti (ITA)	26 June 1975 (aged 24)

=== 2001 ===
Roster in 2001, age as of 1 January 2001:

Rider	Date of birth
Yoshiyuki Abe (JPN)	15 August 1969 (aged 31)
Giosuè Bonomi (ITA)	21 October 1978 (aged 22)
Oscar Borlini (ITA)	12 July 1977 (aged 23)
Fabio Bulgarelli (ITA)	21 January 1977 (aged 23)
Matteo Carrara (ITA)	25 March 1979 (aged 21)
Michele Colleoni (ITA)	14 December 1977 (aged 23)
Alessandro Cortinovis (ITA)	11 October 1977 (aged 23)
Matteo Gigli (ITA)	16 February 1978 (aged 22)
Gianni Gobbini (ITA)	4 February 1976 (aged 24)

Rider	Date of birth
Denis Lunghi (ITA)	21 January 1976 (aged 24)
Rafael Mateos (ESP)	23 February 1976 (aged 24)
Renzo Mazzoleni (ITA)	31 March 1977 (aged 23)
Miguel Ángel Meza (MEX)	19 May 1977 (aged 23)
Hidenori Nodera (JPN)	7 June 1975 (aged 25)
Rafael Nuritdinov (UZB)	12 June 1977 (aged 23)
Massimiliano Razzari (ITA)	7 January 1973 (aged 27)
Moris Sammassimo (ITA)	19 November 1976 (aged 24)

=== 2002 ===
Roster in 2002, age as of 1 January 2002:

Rider	Date of birth
Giosuè Bonomi (ITA)	21 October 1978 (aged 23)
Matteo Carrara (ITA)	25 March 1979 (aged 22)
Michele Colleoni (ITA)	14 December 1977 (aged 24)
Matteo Gigli (ITA)	16 February 1978 (aged 23)
Leonardo Giordani (ITA)	27 May 1977 (aged 24)
Andrea Giupponi (ITA)	18 May 1980 (aged 21)
Roman Luhovyy (UKR)	4 August 1979 (aged 22)
Denis Lunghi (ITA)	21 January 1976 (aged 25)

Rider	Date of birth
Rafael Mateos (ESP)	23 February 1976 (aged 25)
Renzo Mazzoleni (ITA)	31 March 1977 (aged 24)
Miguel Ángel Meza (MEX)	19 May 1977 (aged 24)
Hidenori Nodera (JPN)	7 June 1975 (aged 26)
Rafael Nuritdinov (UZB)	12 June 1977 (aged 24)
Vladimir Smirnov (LTU)	13 April 1978 (aged 23)
Alessandro Vanotti (ITA)	16 September 1980 (aged 21)
