= Index–Alexia Alluminio =

Index-Alexia Alluminio
Team information
- Registered: Italy
- Founded: 2000
- Disbanded: 2002

Team name history
- 2000 2001 2002: Alexia Alluminio (ALA); Alexia Alluminio (ALA); Index-Alexia Alluminio (INA)

Index–Alexia Alluminio was an Italian cycling team, active between 2000 and 2002. The team won the 2002 Giro d'Italia with Paolo Savoldelli.

== Major wins ==
2000
GP d'Europe, Dario Andriotto
Memorial Cecchi Gori, Stage 1 (Chianciano), Oscar Cavagnis
Tour de Beauce, Stage 3 (Mt Megantic), Stefano Della Santa
Ukraine National Championship, Serguei Outschakov
GP Città di Rio Saliceto e Correggio, Eddy Serri
Six Days of Berlin, Marco Villa
2001
Giro Riviera Ligure Pomente, Stage 1 (Alassio), Daniele Galli
Freccia dei Vini - Memorial Dott. Luigi Raffele Damiano Giannini
Six Days of Fiorenzuola d'Arda, Ivan Quaranta and Marco Villa
Giro d'Italia

Stage 5 (Nettuno), Ivan Quaranta
Stage 16 (Parma), Ivan Quaranta

Ronde van Nederland, Stage 3 (Denekamp), Ivan Quaranta
Settimana Ciclistica Internazionale Coppi-Bartali, Stage 1 (Ferrara), Ivan Quaranta
Six Days of Turin, Marco Villa and Ivan Quaranta
Tour de Langkawi, Stage 7 (Klang), Ivan Quaranta
Six Days of Stuttgart, Marco Villa
2002
Dwars door Gendringen, Ivan Quaranta
Postgirot Open, Stage 5 (Göteborg), Ivan Quaranta
Regio-Tour, Stage 2a (Müllheim), Ivan Quaranta
Tour of Qatar, Stage 1 (Doha), Ivan Quaranta
Tour de Langkawi, Stage 8 (Petaling Jaya), Antonio Salomone
Giro d'Italia

Overall, Paolo Savoldelli

Six Days of Amsterdam, Marco Villa
Six-Days of Grenoble, Marco Villa
Six Days of Turin, Marco Villa and Ivan Quaranta
