= Pietro Caucchioli =

Italian cyclist

Personal information
- Full name: Pietro Caucchioli
- Born: 22 August 1975 (age 51) Bovolone, Italy

Cycling career
- Sport: Cycling
- Discipline: Road
- Role: Rider

Professional teams
- 1999–2000: Amica Chips
- 2001–2004: Alessio
- 2005–2008: Crédit Agricole
- 2009: Lampre–NGC

Major wins
- Giro d'Italia, 2 stages

Pietro Caucchioli (born 22 August 1975 in Bovolone, Veneto) is an Italian professional road racing cyclist. His two-stage wins at the 2001 Giro d'Italia and a podium finish (3rd place) at the 2002 Giro are his finest career accomplishments.

== Major results ==
1992
3rd Road race, National Junior Road Championships
1997
1st Circuito Belvedere
1998
1st Circuito Belvedere
4th Overall Giro Ciclistico d'Italia
1999
1st Stage 4 Giro della Provincia di Lucca
3rd Trofeo Calvià
7th Overall Vuelta a Murcia
8th Giro di Romagna
9th Trofeo Melinda
9th Trofeo dello Scalatore
2000
8th Overall Giro del Trentino
8th GP Industria & Artigianato Larciano
8th Giro dell'Appennino
2001
7th Overall Vuelta a Andalucía
8th Coppa Ugo Agostoni
9th Overall Giro d'Italia

1st Stages 8 & 17

2002
1st Stage 3 Vuelta a Aragón
3rd Overall Giro d'Italia
6th Gran Premio di Lugano
8th Trofeo Pantalica
2003
2nd Overall Giro della Provincia di Lucca

1st Stage 3

2nd Overall Route du Sud
8th Giro del Friuli
2004
10th Tour du Haut Var
11th Overall Tour de France
2005
8th Overall Giro d'Italia
2006
2nd Tour du Haut Var
3rd Overall Tour Méditerranéen

1st Stage 3 (TTT)

5th Trofeo Laigueglia
8th Overall Paris–Nice
9th Overall Dauphiné Libéré
Vuelta a España

Held after Stages 9–16

2007
3rd Overall Tour de Wallonie
7th Overall Tour Méditerranéen
2008
5th Overall Deutschland Tour
2009
9th Overall Giro del Trentino
