= 2002 Giro d'Italia =

Race details
- Dates: 11 May - 2 June 2002
- Stages: 20 + Prologue
- Distance: 3,354.5 km (2,084 mi)
- Winning time: 89h 22' 42"

Results
Jersey awarded to the overall winner	Winner	Paolo Savoldelli (ITA)	(Index Alexia)
	Second	Tyler Hamilton (USA)	(CSC–Tiscali)
	Third	Pietro Caucchioli (ITA)	(Alessio)
Jersey awarded to the points classification winner	Points	Mario Cipollini (ITA)	(Acqua & Sapone)
Jersey awarded to the mountains classification winner	Mountains	Julio Alberto Pérez (MEX)	(Ceramiche Panaria–Fiordo)
	Combativity	Massimo Strazzer (ITA)	(Phonak)
Jersey awarded to the intergiro classification winner	Intergiro	Massimo Strazzer (ITA)	(Phonak)
	Team	Alessio	
	Team points	Alessio	

The 2002 Giro d'Italia was the 85th edition of the Giro d'Italia, one of cycling's Grand Tours. The Giro began with a 6.5 km (4 mi) prologue that navigated through the streets of the Dutch city Groningen. The race came to a close with a mass-start stage that ended in the Italian city of Milan. Twenty-two teams entered the race that was won by the Italian Paolo Savoldelli of the Index Alexia team. Second and third were the American Tyler Hamilton and Italian Pietro Caucchioli.

In the race's other classifications, Ceramiche Panaria–Fiordo rider Julio Alberto Pérez won the mountains classification, Massimo Strazzer of the Phonak team won the intergiro classification, and Acqua & Sapone rider Mario Cipollini won the points classification. Alessio finished as the winners of the Trofeo Fast Team classification, ranking each of the twenty-two teams contesting the race by lowest cumulative time. The other team classification, the Trofeo Super Team classification, where the teams' riders are awarded points for placing within the top twenty in each stage and the points are then totaled for each team was also won by Alessio.

== Teams ==
A total of 22 teams were invited to participate in the 2002 Giro d'Italia. Each team sent a squad of nine riders, so the Giro began with a peloton of 198 cyclists. Out of the 198 riders that started this edition of the Giro d'Italia, a total of 140 riders made it to the finish in Milan.

The 22 teams that took part in the race were:

- Acqua & Sapone
- Alessio
- Ceramiche Panaria–Fiordo
- Colombia–Selle Italia
- Fassa Bortolo
- Gerolsteiner
- Index Alexia
- Kelme–Costa Blanca
- Lampre–Daikin
- Landbouwkrediet–Colnago
- Lotto–Adecco
- Mapei–Quick-Step
- Mercatone Uno
- Mobilvetta Design–Formaggi Trentini
- Phonak
- Rabobank
- Saeco–Longoni Sport
- Tacconi Sport
- Team Coast
- Team Colpack–Astro
- CSC–Tiscali
- Team Telekom

== Route and stages ==
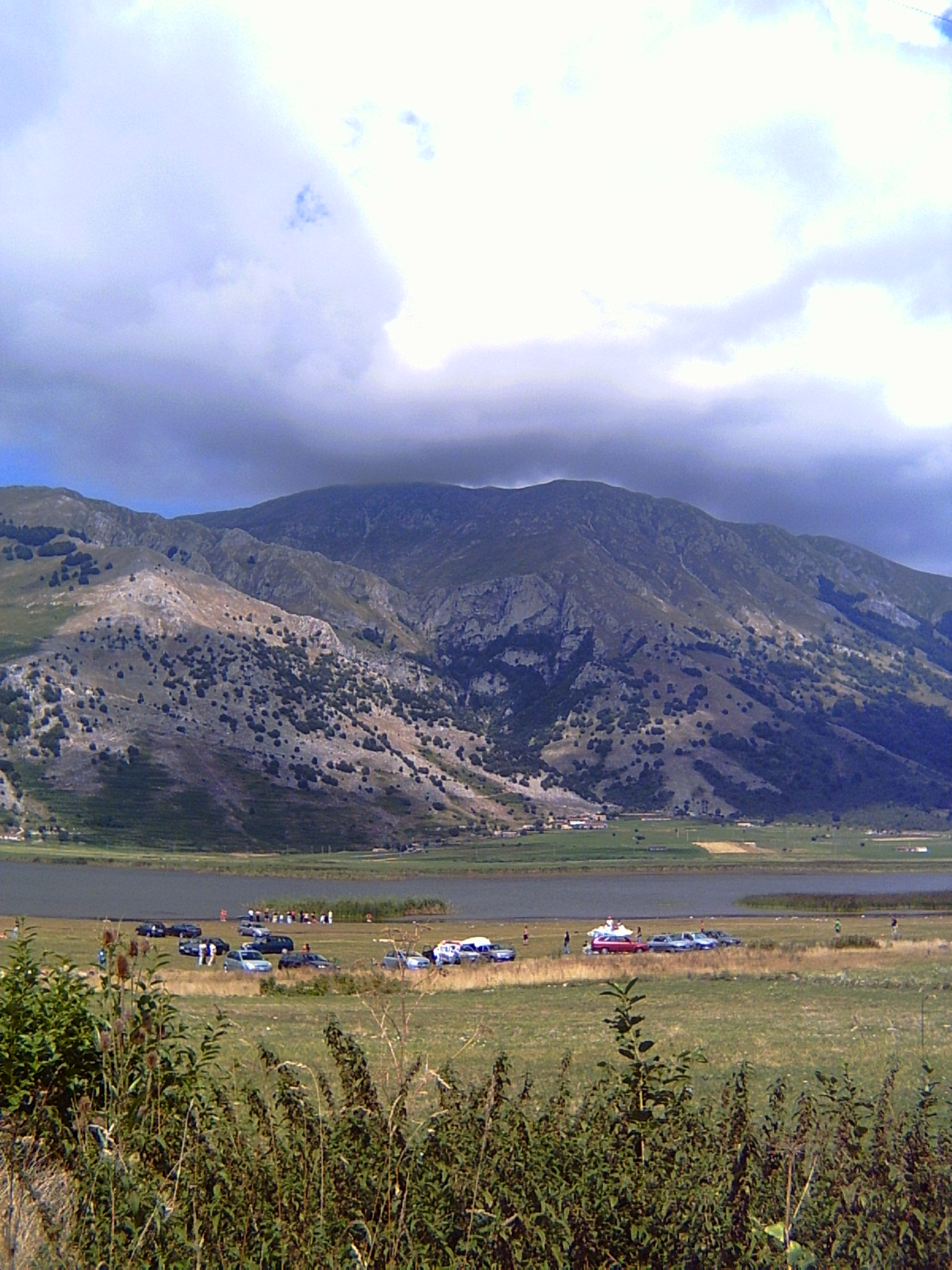
Campitello Matese hosted the end of the 140 km (87 mi) eleventh stage.

The route for the 2002 Giro d'Italia was unveiled by race director Carmine Castellano on 17 November 2001 in Milan. It contained three time trial events, all of which were individual. In the stages containing categorized climbs, four had summit finishes: stage 5, to Limone Piemonte; stage 11, to Campitello Matese; stage 13, to San Giacomo; and stage 17, to Passo Coe. The organizers chose to include two rest days. When compared to the previous year's race, the race was 1.5 km (1 mi) shorter, contained one more rest day, and one more individual time trial. In addition, this race had an opening prologue like the year before.

Stage characteristics and winners
Stage	Date	Course	Distance	Type	Winner
P	11 May	Groningen (Netherlands)	6.5 km (4 mi)	Individual time trial	Juan Carlos Domínguez (ESP)
1	12 May	Groningen (Netherlands) to Münster (Germany)	218 km (135 mi)	Flat stage	Mario Cipollini (ITA)
2	13 May	Cologne (Germany) to Ans (Belgium)	209 km (130 mi)	Flat stage	Stefano Garzelli (ITA)
3	14 May	Verviers (Belgium) to Esch-sur-Alzette (Luxembourg)	206 km (128 mi)	Flat stage	Mario Cipollini (ITA)
4	15 May	Esch-sur-Alzette (Luxembourg) to Strasbourg (France)	232 km (144 mi)	Flat stage	Robbie McEwen (AUS)
	16 May	Rest day			
5	17 May	Fossano to Limone Piemonte	150 km (93 mi)	Medium mountain stage	Stefano Garzelli (ITA)
6	18 May	Cuneo to Varazze	190 km (118 mi)	Medium mountain stage	Giovanni Lombardi (ITA)
7	19 May	Viareggio to Lido di Camaiore	159 km (99 mi)	Medium mountain stage	Rik Verbrugghe (BEL)
8	20 May	Capannori to Orvieto	237 km (147 mi)	Flat stage	Aitor González (ESP)
9	21 May	Tivoli to Caserta	201 km (125 mi)	Flat stage	Mario Cipollini (ITA)
10	22 May	Maddaloni to Benevento	118 km (73 mi)	Medium mountain stage	Robbie McEwen (AUS)
11	23 May	Benevento to Campitello Matese	143 km (89 mi)	Medium mountain stage	Gilberto Simoni (ITA)
12	24 May	Campobasso to Chieti	205 km (127 mi)	Medium mountain stage	Denis Lunghi (ITA)
13	25 May	Chieti to San Giacomo di Valle Castellana	186 km (116 mi)	Medium mountain stage	Julio Alberto Pérez (MEX)
14	26 May	Numana to Numana	30.3 km (19 mi)	Individual time trial	Tyler Hamilton (USA)
	27 May	Rest day			
15	28 May	Terme Euganee to Conegliano	156 km (97 mi)	Flat stage	Mario Cipollini (ITA)
16	29 May	Conegliano to Corvara	163 km (101 mi)	Mountain stage	Julio Alberto Pérez (MEX)
17	30 May	Corvara to Folgaria	222 km (138 mi)	Mountain stage	Pavel Tonkov (RUS)
18	31 May	Rovereto to Brescia	145 km (90 mi)	Flat stage	Mario Cipollini (ITA)
19	1 June	Cambiago to Monticello Brianza	46 km (29 mi)	Individual time trial	Aitor González (ESP)
20	2 June	Cantù to Milan	141 km (88 mi)	Flat stage	Mario Cipollini (ITA)
	Total		3,354.5 km (2,084 mi)		

== Classification Leadership ==
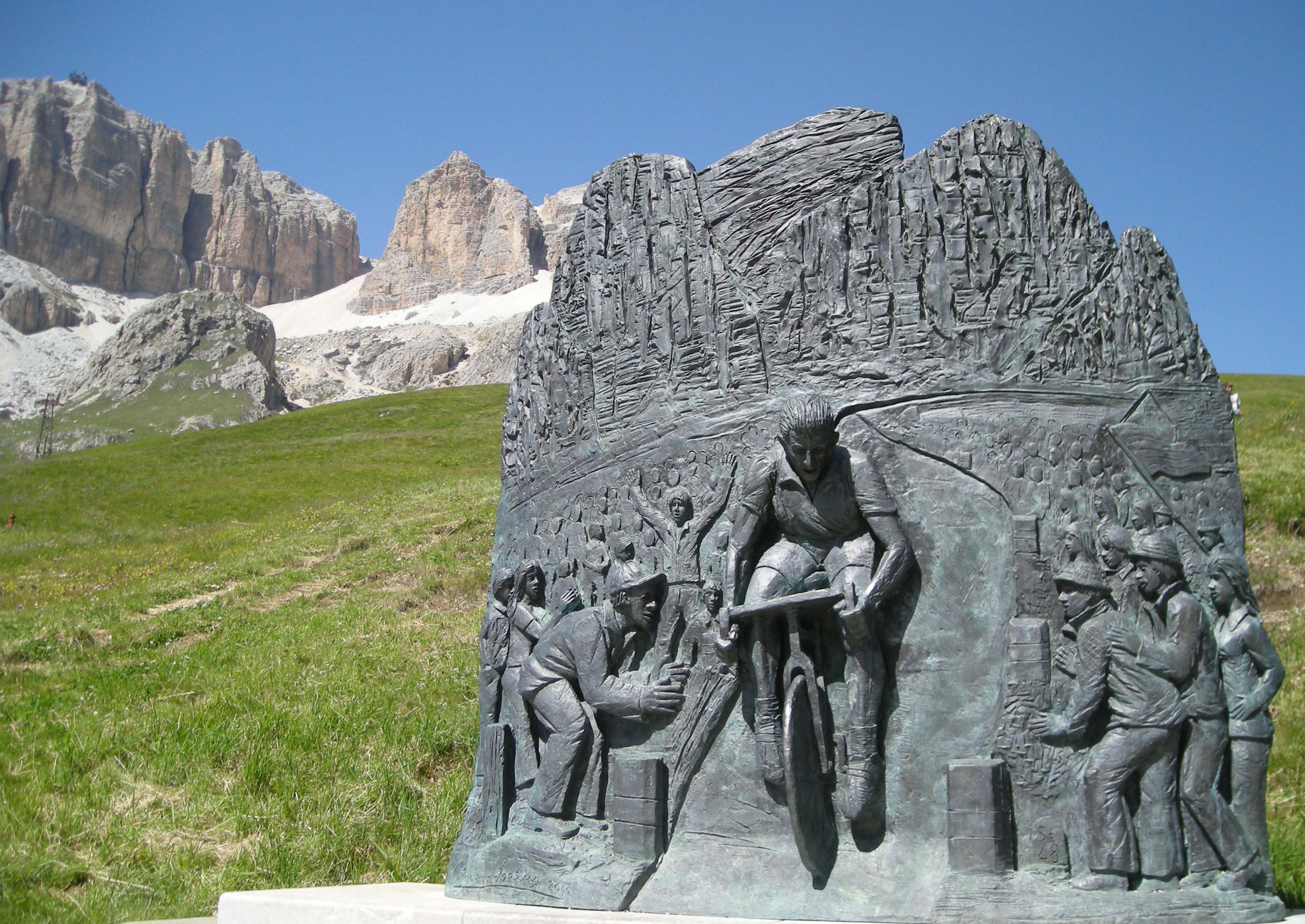
The statue of Fausto Coppi on the Pordoi Pass from which the Coppi in Cima Coppi is derived.

In the 2002 Giro d'Italia, five different jerseys were awarded. For the general classification, calculated by adding each cyclist's finishing times on each stage, and allowing time bonuses for the first three finishers on mass-start stages, the leader received a pink jersey. This classification is considered the most important of the Giro d'Italia, and the winner is considered the winner of the Giro.

Additionally, there was a points classification, which awarded a mauve jersey. In the points classification, cyclists got points for finishing in the top 15 in a stage. The stage win awarded 25 points, second place awarded 20 points, third 16, fourth 14, fifth 12, sixth 10, and one point fewer per place down the line, to a single point for 15th. In addition, points could be won in intermediate sprints.

There was also a mountains classification, which awarded a green jersey. In the mountains classifications, points were won by reaching the top of a mountain before other cyclists. Each climb was categorized as either first, second, or third category, with more points available for the higher-categorized climbs. The highest point in the Giro (called the Cima Coppi), which in 2002 was the Passo Pordoi, afforded more points than the other first-category climbs.

The fourth jersey represented the intergiro classification, marked by a blue jersey. The calculation for the intergiro is similar to that of the general classification, in each stage there is a midway point that the riders pass through a point and where their time is stopped. As the race goes on, their times compiled and the person with the lowest time is the leader of the intergiro classification and wears the blue jersey.

There were also two classifications for teams. The first was the Trofeo Fast Team. In this classification, the times of the best three cyclists per team on each stage were added; the leading team was the team with the lowest total time. The Trofeo Super Team was a team points classification, with the top 20 placed riders on each stage earning points (20 for first place, 19 for second place and so on, down to a single point for 20th) for their team.

The rows in the following table correspond to the jerseys awarded after that stage was run.

Classification leadership by stage
Stage	Winner	General classification	Points classification	Mountains classification	Intergiro classification	Trofeo Fast Team	Trofeo Super Team
P	Juan Carlos Domínguez	Juan Carlos Domínguez	not awarded	not awarded	not awarded	not awarded	not awarded
1	Mario Cipollini	Mario Cipollini	Mario Cipollini	not awarded	Mario Cipollini	Phonak	Phonak
2	Stefano Garzelli	Stefano Garzelli	Mario Cipollini	Francesco Casagrande	Fabrizio Guidi	Mapei–Quick-Step	Mapei–Quick-Step
3	Mario Cipollini	Stefano Garzelli	Mario Cipollini	Francesco Casagrande	Massimo Strazzer	Mapei–Quick-Step	Phonak
4	Robbie McEwen	Stefano Garzelli	Mario Cipollini	Francesco Casagrande	Massimo Strazzer	Mapei–Quick-Step	Phonak
5	Stefano Garzelli	Stefano Garzelli	Mario Cipollini	Stefano Garzelli	Massimo Strazzer	Mapei–Quick-Step	Fassa Bortolo
6	Giovanni Lombardi	Jens Heppner	Mario Cipollini	Stefano Garzelli	Massimo Strazzer	Kelme–Costa Blanca	Phonak
7	Rik Verbrugghe	Jens Heppner	Mario Cipollini	Stefano Garzelli	Massimo Strazzer	Kelme–Costa Blanca	Phonak
8	Aitor González	Jens Heppner	Massimo Strazzer	Stefano Garzelli	Massimo Strazzer	Kelme–Costa Blanca	Phonak
9	Mario Cipollini	Jens Heppner	Mario Cipollini	Stefano Garzelli	Massimo Strazzer	Phonak	Phonak
10	Robbie McEwen	Jens Heppner	Massimo Strazzer	Ruggero Marzoli	Massimo Strazzer	Kelme–Costa Blanca	Phonak
11	Gilberto Simoni	Jens Heppner	Massimo Strazzer	Gilberto Simoni	Massimo Strazzer	Kelme–Costa Blanca	Alessio
12	Denis Lunghi	Jens Heppner	Massimo Strazzer	Joaquim Castelblanco	Massimo Strazzer	Alessio	Phonak
13	Julio Alberto Perez Cuapio	Jens Heppner	Massimo Strazzer	Francesco Casagrande	Massimo Strazzer	Alessio	Alessio
14	Tyler Hamilton	Jens Heppner	Massimo Strazzer	Francesco Casagrande	Massimo Strazzer	Alessio	Alessio
15	Mario Cipollini	Jens Heppner	Massimo Strazzer	Joaquim Castelblanco	Massimo Strazzer	Alessio	Alessio
16	Julio Alberto Perez Cuapio	Cadel Evans	Massimo Strazzer	Julio Alberto Pérez Cuapio	Massimo Strazzer	Alessio	Alessio
17	Pavel Tonkov	Paolo Savoldelli	Massimo Strazzer	Julio Alberto Pérez Cuapio	Massimo Strazzer	Alessio	Alessio
18	Mario Cipollini	Paolo Savoldelli	Mario Cipollini	Julio Alberto Pérez Cuapio	Massimo Strazzer	Alessio	Alessio
19	Aitor González	Paolo Savoldelli	Mario Cipollini	Julio Alberto Pérez Cuapio	Massimo Strazzer	Alessio	Alessio
20	Mario Cipollini	Paolo Savoldelli	Mario Cipollini	Julio Alberto Pérez Cuapio	Massimo Strazzer	Alessio	Alessio
Final		Paolo Savoldelli	Mario Cipollini	Julio Alberto Perez Cuapio	Massimo Strazzer	Alessio	Alessio

== Final standings ==
Legend
Pink jersey	Denotes the winner of the General classification	Green jersey	Denotes the winner of the Mountains classification
Purple jersey	Denotes the winner of the Points classification	Blue jersey	Denotes the winner of the Intergiro classification

=== General classification ===
	Rider	Team	Time
1	Paolo Savoldelli (ITA)	Index Alexia	89h 22' 42"
2	Tyler Hamilton (USA)	CSC–Tiscali	+ 1' 41"
3	Pietro Caucchioli (ITA)	Alessio	+ 2' 12"
4	Juan Manuel Gárate (ESP)	Lampre–Daikin	+ 3' 14"
5	Pavel Tonkov (RUS)	Lampre–Daikin	+ 5' 34"
6	Aitor González (ESP)	Kelme–Costa Blanca	+ 6' 54"
7	Georg Totschnig (AUT)	Gerolsteiner	+ 7' 02"
8	Fernando Escartín (ESP)	Team Coast	+ 7' 07"
9	Rik Verbrugghe (BEL)	Lotto–Adecco	+ 9' 36"
10	Dario Frigo (ITA)	Tacconi Sport-Emmegi	+ 11' 50"

=== Points classification ===
	Rider	Team	Points
1	Mario Cipollini (ITA)	Acqua & Sapone	184
2	Massimo Strazzer (ITA)	Phonak	166
3	Aitor González (ESP)	Kelme–Costa Blanca	106
4	Alessandro Petacchi (ITA)	Fassa Bortolo	101
5	Tyler Hamilton (USA)	CSC–Tiscali	86
6	Mykhaylo Khalilov (UKR)	Colombia–Selle Italia	85
7	Paolo Savoldelli (ITA)	Index Alexia	80
8	Cristian Moreni (ITA)	Alessio	79
9	Dario Frigo (ITA)	Tacconi Sport-Emmegi	74
10	Juan Manuel Gárate (ESP)	Lampre–Daikin	70

=== Mountains classification ===
	Rider	Team	Points
1	Julio Alberto Pérez (MEX)	Ceramiche Panaria–Fiordo	69
2	José Castelblanco (COL)	Colombia–Selle Italia	33
3	Pavel Tonkov (RUS)	Lampre–Daikin	25
4	Daniele De Paoli (ITA)	Alessio	22
5	Sergio Barbero (ITA)	Lampre–Daikin	20
6	Dario Frigo (ITA)	Tacconi Sport-Emmegi	20
7	Pietro Caucchioli (ITA)	Alessio	19
8	Ruben Alverio Marin (COL)	Colombia–Selle Italia	18
9	Paolo Savoldelli (ITA)	Index Alexia	18
10	Cadel Evans (AUS)	Mapei–Quick-Step	15

=== Intergiro classification ===
	Rider	Team	Time
1	Massimo Strazzer (ITA)	Phonak	55h 05' 46"
2	Serhiy Honchar (UKR)	Fassa Bortolo	+ 4' 26"
3	Aitor González (ESP)	Kelme–Costa Blanca	+ 4' 41"
4	Tyler Hamilton (USA)	CSC–Tiscali	+ 4' 46"
5	Biagio Conte (ITA)	Saeco–Longoni Sport	+ 4' 55"
6	Mykhaylo Khalilov (UKR)	Colombia–Selle Italia	+ 5' 04"
7	Mariano Piccoli (ITA)	Lampre–Daikin	+ 5' 24"
8	Alessandro Petacchi (ITA)	Fassa Bortolo	+ 5' 26"
9	Paolo Savoldelli (ITA)	Index Alexia	+ 5' 27"
10	Mario Cipollini (ITA)	Acqua & Sapone	+ 5' 36"

=== Trofeo Fast Team classification ===
	Team	Time
1	Alessio	267h 57' 29"
2	Lampre–Daikin	+ 30' 10"
3	Rabobank	+ 40' 12"
4	CSC–Tiscali	+ 42' 03"
5	Mapei–Quick-Step	+ 45' 55"
6	Tacconi Sport-Emmegi	+ 57' 25"
7	Kelme–Costa Blanca	+ 58' 00"
8	Gerolsteiner	+ 1h 16' 29"
9	Colombia–Selle Italia	+ 1h 35' 57"
10	Fassa Bortolo	+ 1h 47' 08"

=== Trofeo Super Team classification ===
	Team	Points
1	Alessio	360
2	Phonak	306
3	Fassa Bortolo	284
4	Mapei–Quick-Step	260
5	Lampre–Daikin	259
6	Lotto–Adecco	254
7	Kelme–Costa Blanca	253
8	Gerolsteiner	226
9	Acqua & Sapone	223
10	Team Coast	213

=== Minor classifications ===
Other less well-known classifications, whose leaders did not receive a special jersey, were awarded during the Giro. Other awards included the Combativity classification, which was a compilation of points gained for position on crossing intermediate sprints, mountain passes and stage finishes. Italian Massimo Strazzer won the Most Combative classification. The Azzurri d'Italia classification was based on finishing order, but points were awarded only to the top three finishers in each stage. The Azzurri d'Italia classification was won by Mario Cipollini. The Trofeo Fuga Piaggio classification rewarded riders who took part in a breakaway at the head of the field, each rider in an escape of ten or fewer riders getting one point for each kilometre that the group stayed clear. The classification was won by Mariano Piccoli. Teams were given penalty points for minor technical infringements. Colombia–Selle Italia was the most successful in avoiding penalties after not being penalized during the race, and so won the Fair Play classification.
