= Alessio–Bianchi =

Team information
- UCI code: ALB
- Registered: Italy
- Founded: 1998
- Disbanded: 2004
- Discipline: Road
- Bicycles: Bianchi

Key personnel
- General manager: Bruno Cenghialta

Team name history
- 1998 1999 2000–2003 2004: Ballan; Ballan-Alessio; Alessio; Alessio-Bianchi

Alessio–Bianchi was an Italian professional cycling team which existed from 1998 to 2004. It was created in 1998 as Ballan. In 1999 Italian wheels manufacturer Alessio came in as co-sponsor, and in 2000 as main sponsor. The team was dissolved by the end of the 2004 season.

== History ==
The team began in 1998 as Ballan. Flavio Miozzo, the team director said he selected the riders for the team very carefully filling a roster of only fourteen riders and hoping to race in some of the largest races in the world.

=== 2004 ===
The final year of the team started with a team presentation in Italy with Bianchi coming across from the now defunct Team Coast to sponsor the team. In early February news surfaced of the team being unable to pay some of their Scandinavian riders. On 13 February 2004 Memory Corp came in as a new sponsor to cover the wages of the riders who missed theirs. The team's first win came in Stage 3 of Giro della Provincia di Lucca by Alessandro Bertolini which led to Bertolini taking the leaders jersey by 1:51. Bertolini was one of eighteen who finished inside the time limit of the stage after the peloton allowed the break to get an advantage of over thirty minutes. Bertolini held onto the jersey to take the overall finishing 9 seconds down on the stage 4 winner Florent Brard. One of the Team's goals was the 2004 Tour de France with Pietro Caucchioli being their man in contention for the overall. The team had two riders finish in the top 10 of Stage 3.

== Final Roster (2004) ==
As of 1 January 2004

Rider	Date of birth
Magnus Bäckstedt (SWE)	30 January 1975 (aged 28)
Fabio Baldato (ITA)	13 June 1968 (aged 35)
Alessandro Bertolini (ITA)	27 July 1971 (aged 32)
Pietro Caucchioli (ITA)	28 August 1975 (aged 28)
Raffaele Ferrara (ITA)	3 October 1976 (aged 27)
Angelo Furlan (ITA)	21 June 1977 (aged 26)
Martin Hvastija (SLO)	30 November 1969 (aged 34)
Ruslan Ivanov (MDA)	18 December 1973 (aged 30)
René Jørgensen (DEN)	26 July 1975 (aged 28)
Marcus Ljungqvist (SWE)	26 October 1974 (aged 29)

Rider	Date of birth
Denis Lunghi (ITA)	21 January 1976 (aged 27)
Vladimir Miholjević (HRV)	18 January 1974 (aged 29)
Cristian Moreni (ITA)	21 November 1972 (aged 31)
Claus Michael Møller (DEN)	October 1968 (aged 35)
Andrea Noè (ITA)	15 January 1969 (aged 34)
Franco Pellizotti (ITA)	15 January 1978 (aged 25)
Ellis Rastelli (ITA)	18 January 1975 (aged 28)
Michael Skelde (DEN)	13 August 1973 (aged 30)
Scott Sunderland (AUS)	28 November 1966 (aged 37)
Andrea Tafi (ITA)	7 May 1966 (aged 37)

== Major wins ==
1998
Stage 1 Giro di Calabria, Endrio Leoni
Stage 4 Tirreno–Adriatico, Gabriele Colombo
Stage 3a Four Days of Dunkirk, Alexandre Gontchenkov
Stage 5 Four Days of Dunkirk, Gabriele Colombo
Luk-Cup Bühl, Piotr Ugrumov
1999
Stage 5 Tour Méditerranéen, Fabio Baldato
Trofeo Pantalica, Andrea Ferrigato
Berner Rundfahrt, Andrea Ferrigato
Stage 4 Giro del Trentino, Alexandre Gontchenkov
Stage 2 Four Days of Dunkirk, Andrea Ferrigato
Stage 1 OBV Classic, Carlo Finco
Stage 2 Danmark Rundt, Fabio Baldato
Stage 3 Danmark Rundt, Nicola Loda
Stage 4 Tour de Suisse, Gilberto Simoni
2001
Stage 2 & 8 Tirreno–Adriatico, Endrio Leoni
Stages 8 & 17 Giro d'Italia, Pietro Caucchioli
2002
Stage 6 Tirreno–Adriatico, Franco Pellizotti
Stage 4 Tour of the Basque Country, Franco Pellizotti
Stages 17 & 20 Vuelta a España, Angelo Furlan
2003
Stage 5 Tirreno–Adriatico, Ruggero Marzoli
Stage 3 Tour de Romandie, Laurent Dufaux
Stage 2 Giro d'Italia, Fabio Baldato
2004
Overall Giro della Provincia di Lucca, Alessandro Bertolini

Stage 3, Alessandro Bertolini

Gran Premio di Chiasso, Franco Pellizotti
Paris-Roubaix, Magnus Bäckstedt
Stage 5 Course de la Paix, Martin Hvastija
Stage 1 Route du Sud, Cristian Moreni
Italy Road Race Championships, Cristian Moreni
Scandinavian Open Road Race, Marcus Ljungqvist
Coppa Bernocchi, Angelo Furlan
Stages 1 & 4 Tour de Pologne, Fabio Baldato
