= Vini Caldirola =

Italian bike racing team

Casa Vini Caldirola (or the Caldirola Wine House) sponsored an Italian professional road bicycle racing team between 1998 and 2004, with a gap in 2002, where the main sponsor was Tacconi Sport. In 2005 the team was formally disbanded, but many riders continued in the new Liquigas-Bianchi UCI ProTour team.

== Team name ==
As professional racing teams change name with their sponsors, the name of the team has varied in its lifetime.

| Year | Name |
|---|---|
| 2004 | Vini Caldirola–Nobili Rubinetterie |
| 2003 | Vini Caldirola–So.di |
| 2002 | Tacconi Sport–Emmegi |
| 2001 | Tacconi Sport–Vini Caldirola |
| 2000 | Vini Caldirola–Sidermec |
| 1999 | Vini Caldirola |
| 1998 | Vini Caldirola |

== Notable riders ==
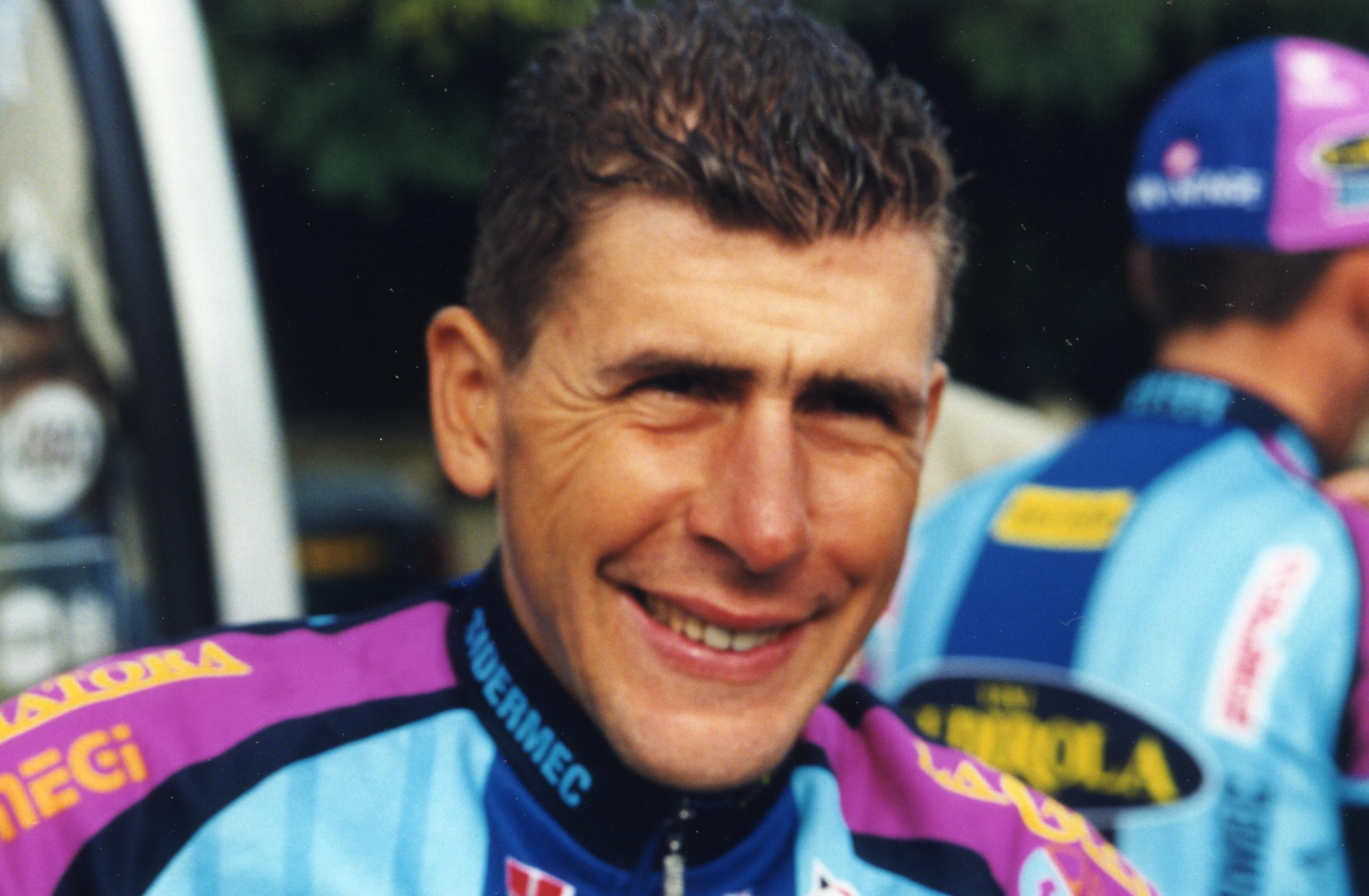
Francesco Casagrande was one of Vini Caldirola's best riders.

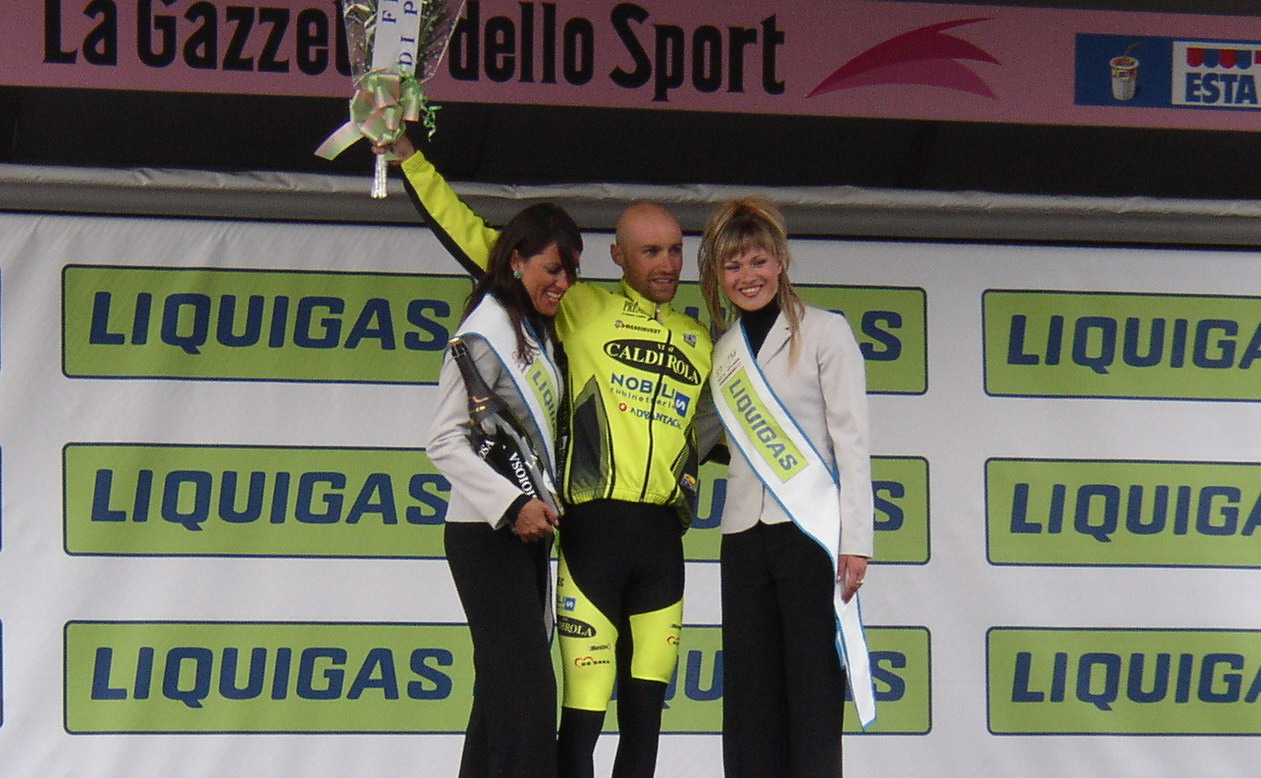
Stefano Garzelli won several stages of the Giro d'Italia while riding for Vini Caldirola.

| Name | Nationality | Years |
|---|---|---|
| Francesco Casagrande | Italy | 1999-2000, 2004 |
| Romāns Vainšteins | Latvia | 1999–2000, 2003 |
| Stefano Garzelli | Italy | 2003-2004 |
| Pavel Tonkov | Russia | 2004 |
| Serhiy Honchar | Ukraine | 1999 |
| Guido Trentin | Italy | 1998–2000 |
| Eddy Mazzoleni | Italy | 2001–2003 |
| Matthew White | Australia | 1999–2000 |
| Andrej Hauptman | Slovenia | 1999–2003 |
| Gabriele Balducci | Italy | 2001–2003 |
| David George | South Africa | 2001 |
| Nicola Minali | Italy | 2001-2002 |
| Dario Frigo | Italy | 2002 |
| Sylwester Szmyd | Poland | 2001–2002 |
| David de la Fuente | Spain | 2003 |
| Fred Rodriguez | United States | 2003 |
| Marco Zanotti | Italy | 2004 |
| Dario Andriotto | Italy | 2003–2004 |
