= 2007 Giro d'Italia, Stage 1 to Stage 11 =

Cycling race stages

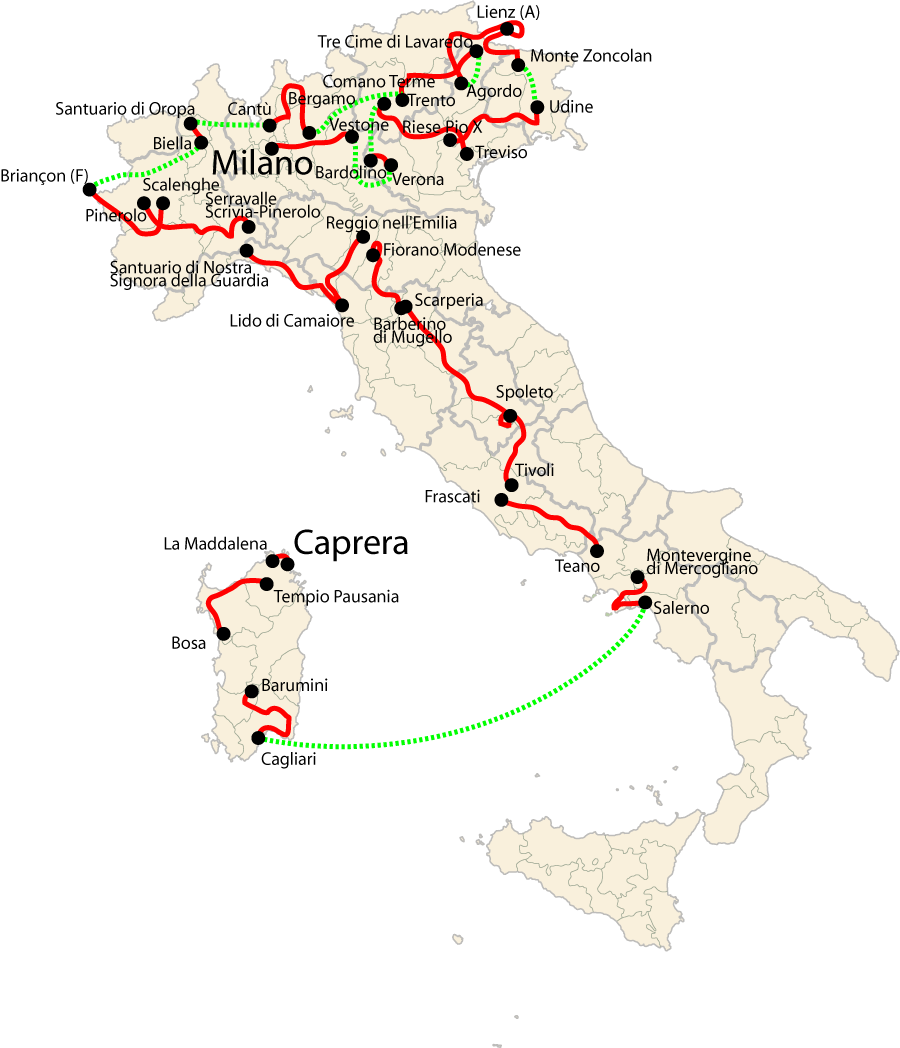
Overview of the stages; red lines represent distances covered in the individual stages, while green lines are the distances between the stages

The 2007 Giro d'Italia began on 12 May, with Stage 11 occurring on 23 May. The route began in Caprera in Sardinia, with the first three stages being held on the island. These were followed by an unusually early rest day to transfer to Italy's mainland.

The first stage was a team time trial, a stage where each member of the team raced together against the clock. The Italian Liquigas team won this stage, but it was sprinter Enrico Gasparotto and not team leader Danilo Di Luca who was the first across the line and thus the first wearer of the pink jersey. Gasparotto and Di Luca traded the jersey back and forth over the next few days' flat stages.

Stage 6 featured a winning breakaway, and it accounted for the only time in the 2007 Giro when the Liquigas team did not hold the race leadership. Marco Pinotti and Luis Felipe Laverde were the last riders remaining from that day's morning escape, claiming the pink jersey and the stage win, respectively. Pinotti held the race leadership through the flat stages that followed, before yielding it to the Giro's oldest rider, Di Luca's Liquigas teammate Andrea Noè.

Italian sprinter Alessandro Petacchi of Team Milram won three of the first eleven stages of this Giro, but his subsequent disqualification for a non-negative salbutamol test after stage 11 nullified these victories.

Legend
A pink jersey	Denotes the leader of the General classification	A green jersey	Denotes the leader of the Mountains classification
A violet jersey	Denotes the leader of the Points classification	A white jersey	Denotes the leader of the Young rider classification
	s.t. indicates that the rider crossed the finish line in the same group as the one receiving the time above him, and was therefore credited with the same finishing time.		

== Stage 1 ==
12 May 2007 — Caprera to La Maddalena, 25.6 km (15.9 mi) (team time trial)

This was the Giro's first visit to Sardinia since 1991. The course for the team time trial was technical, with many twists and turns in the road. It took the squads from Caprera on the island of Sardinia across a bridge to the tiny Maddalena island to the northwest. Favorites for the stage included Team CSC, Discovery Channel, and Quick-Step–Innergetic.

The early time to beat was set by Predictor–Lotto, the second team to take the course. They stopped the clock in 35'06". Euskaltel–Euskadi was well on pace to knock them off, but a crash 750 m (2,460 ft) from the finish line dashed any hopes of theirs for a stage win. Their fifth rider didn't cross the line until a minute after their first four had, and they finished 21st, better than only Française des Jeux. Team CSC was the first team under 35 minutes, clocking in at 34'08", which would eventually be good for third on the day. Paolo Savoldelli's Astana team finished with only the minimum of five riders together, but their 33'51" was nearly good enough for the stage win. The winning team was Liquigas, coming home with six riders in 33'38". The big surprise of the day was that the first Liquigas rider across the line was not their team leader Danilo Di Luca, but rather sprinter Enrico Gasparotto. Di Luca was visibly upset to have not been granted first position as the squad approached the finish line. Though Gasparotto at first claimed it was the team's plan for him and not Di Luca to cross first, he later admitted that he had momentarily forgotten that the team's time was taken for the fifth rider across the line and not the first, explaining that he was simply excited to finish as quickly as possible once the finish line was in view. Along with the pink jersey, Gasparotto was awarded the white jersey for leading the youth classification; his teammate Vincenzo Nibali wore that jersey in stage 2.

Stage 1 result

	Team	Time
1	Liquigas	33' 38"
2	Astana	+ 13"
3	Team CSC	+ 30"
4	Lampre–Fondital	+ 42"
5	Discovery Channel	+ 49"
6	Acqua & Sapone–Caffè Mokambo	+1' 02"
7	Tinkoff Credit Systems	+1' 04"
8	Crédit Agricole	+1' 13"
9	Caisse d'Epargne	+1' 23"
10	Saunier Duval–Prodir	+1' 25"

General classification after stage 1

	Rider	Team	Time
1	Enrico Gasparotto (ITA)	Liquigas	33' 38"
2	Danilo Di Luca (ITA)	Liquigas	s.t.
3	Vincenzo Nibali (ITA)	Liquigas	s.t.
4	Franco Pellizotti (ITA)	Liquigas	s.t.
5	Andrea Noè (ITA)	Liquigas	s.t.
6	Charly Wegelius (GBR)	Liquigas	s.t.
7	Alessandro Vanotti (ITA)	Liquigas	+ 2"
8	Paolo Savoldelli (ITA)	Astana	+ 13"
9	Eddy Mazzoleni (ITA)	Astana	+ 13"
10	Andrey Mizurov (KAZ)	Astana	+ 13"

== Stage 2 ==
13 May 2007 — Tempio Pausania to Bosa, 205 km (127 mi)

Back on Sardinia, the first road race stage of the Giro was flat, heading west from Tempio Pausania along the Gulf of Asinara before going to the south and over the second-category Villanova Monteleone climb, which awarded the first green jersey. A sprint finish was the expectation.

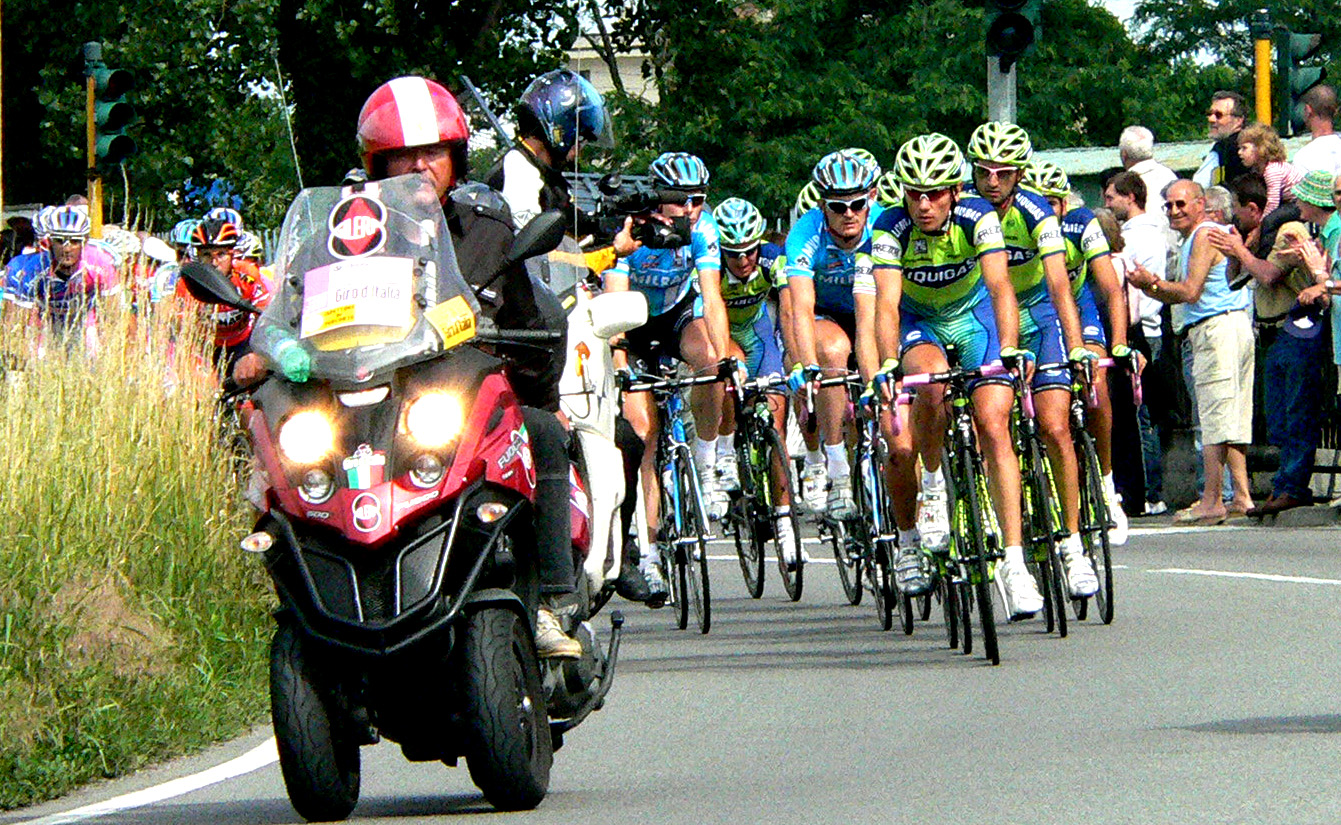
The Liquigas team pacing the main field

Five riders broke free of the peloton after 25 km (16 mi) of racing. These were Frédéric Bessy, Mauro Facci, Simone Masciarelli, Pavel Brutt and Arnaud Labbe. They worked well together, attaining a six-minute advantage by pounding out a 43.2 km/h (26.8 mph) pace after two hours. Liquigas set to making the chase, being joined briefly by Euskaltel–Euskadi. The time gap fell precipitously, despite Brutt's best effort to pace the breakaway. Brutt was the first over the Villanova Monteleone climb, and took the first green jersey on the podium after the stage. As the stage neared its conclusion, the teams of the primary sprinters joined in the chase. Brutt was the last rider left off the front. His solo attempt lasted until the 8 km (5.0 mi) to go mark, when the peloton was all together. Team Milram, Lampre–Fondital and Liquigas came to the front in the final 3 km (1.9 mi) to try to set up the sprint for Alessandro Petacchi, Damiano Cunego and race leader Enrico Gasparotto, but with 1,300 m (4,300 ft) to go, Quick-Step–Innergetic's Andrea Tonti crashed and brought down much of the main field with him. Gasparotto was among the riders to crash. Since the crash took place inside 3 km (1.9 mi) to the finish line, all riders who fell were given the same time as the stage winner.

Predictor–Lotto's fast man Robbie McEwen was 15 or 20 riders deep in the bunch during the descent from the small bump in the road that preceded the finish. He managed to find Petacchi's wheel, and held it while his team Milram executed a leadout in the stage's final kilometer. The veteran Aussie came around Petacchi for the stage win, holding off Paolo Bettini, who had done the same. As Gasparotto finished 43rd on the stage and his team leader Danilo Di Luca 12th, Di Luca took the pink jersey for stage 3, though all the Liquigas riders who finished together in the team time trial were still tied in the overall standings at this point.

Stage 2 result

	Rider	Team	Time
1	Robbie McEwen (AUS)	Predictor–Lotto	5h 07' 13"
2	Paolo Bettini (ITA)	Quick-Step–Innergetic	s.t.
~~3~~	~~Alessandro Petacchi (ITA)~~	~~Team Milram~~	~~s.t.~~
4	Assan Bazayev (KAZ)	Astana	s.t.
5	Maximiliano Richeze (ARG)	Ceramica Panaria–Navigare	s.t.
6	Alexandre Usov (BLR)	AG2R Prévoyance	s.t.
7	José Joaquín Rojas (ESP)	Caisse d'Epargne	s.t.
8	Stefano Garzelli (ITA)	Acqua & Sapone–Caffè Mokambo	s.t.
9	Lorenzo Bernucci (ITA)	T-Mobile Team	s.t.
10	George Hincapie (USA)	Discovery Channel	s.t.

General classification after stage 2

	Rider	Team	Time
1	Danilo Di Luca (ITA)	Liquigas	5h 40' 41"
2	Enrico Gasparotto (ITA)	Liquigas	s.t.
3	Vincenzo Nibali (ITA)	Liquigas	s.t.
4	Charly Wegelius (GBR)	Liquigas	s.t.
5	Andrea Noè (ITA)	Liquigas	s.t.
6	Franco Pellizotti (ITA)	Liquigas	s.t.
7	Paolo Savoldelli (ITA)	Astana	+ 13"
8	Andrey Mizurov (KAZ)	Astana	+ 13"
9	Eddy Mazzoleni (ITA)	Astana	+ 13"
10	Serguei Yakovlev (KAZ)	Astana	+ 13"

== Stage 3 ==
14 May 2007 — Barumini to Cagliari, 181 km (112 mi)

The third stage was also flat, starting in the south-central of Sardinia. It did not have any categorized climbs. It ended in Cagliari, with the last 400 m (1,300 ft) on rough, uneven terrain. After this stage, the Giro took an uncommonly early rest day to transfer to Italy's mainland.

Right away, a five-man breakaway formed, instigated by Mikhail Ignatiev and Elio Aggiano. Their eventual mates were Mickaël Buffaz, Alexandre Pichot, and Giovanni Visconti. Their maximum advantage was 7'40", as the leading team Liquigas did not mount a strong chase for much of the stage. Ignatiev and Visconti attacked at the 70 km (43 mi) to go mark, and the other three were left behind, quickly reabsorbed by the peloton. When the peloton realized that the breakaway had split, the teams of the sprinters, namely Team Milram and Predictor–Lotto, set to making the chase in earnest in order to be able to ensure a mass finish. Ignatiev and Visconti were caught with 4 km (2.5 mi) remaining after bravely fighting on as long as possible. Other inconsequential breakaway attempts took place in the next few minutes, but the group was all one for a mass finish, won by Alessandro Petacchi, though this was one of his many 2007 wins that was later stripped due to his irregular salbutamol test later in the race. Since Enrico Gasparotto contested the sprint and finished 74 places ahead of teammate and overnight race leader Danilo Di Luca, Gasparotto reclaimed the pink jersey while still holding the white. Nibali again wore the white jersey in his stead in the following stage.

Stage 3 result

	Rider	Team	Time
~~1~~	~~Alessandro Petacchi (ITA)~~	~~Team Milram~~	~~4h 22' 57"~~
2	Robert Förster (GER)	Gerolsteiner	s.t.
3	Maximiliano Richeze (ITA)	Ceramica Panaria–Navigare	s.t.
4	Robbie McEwen (AUS)	Predictor–Lotto	s.t.
5	Danilo Napolitano (ITA)	Lampre–Fondital	s.t.
6	Alexandre Usov (BLR)	AG2R Prévoyance	s.t.
7	Lloyd Mondory (FRA)	AG2R Prévoyance	s.t.
8	Enrico Gasparotto (ITA)	Liquigas	s.t.
9	José Joaquín Rojas (ESP)	Caisse d'Epargne	s.t.
10	Volodymyr Bileka (UKR)	Discovery Channel	s.t.

General classification after stage 3

	Rider	Team	Time
1	Enrico Gasparotto (ITA)	Liquigas	10h 03' 48"
2	Danilo Di Luca (ITA)	Liquigas	s.t.
3	Andrea Noè (ITA)	Liquigas	s.t.
4	Franco Pellizotti (ITA)	Liquigas	s.t.
5	Vincenzo Nibali (ITA)	Liquigas	s.t.
6	Charly Wegelius (GBR)	Liquigas	s.t.
7	Paolo Savoldelli (ITA)	Astana	+ 13"
8	Eddy Mazzoleni (ITA)	Astana	+ 13"
9	Andrey Mizurov (KAZ)	Astana	+ 13"
10	Dmitriy Muravyev (KAZ)	Astana	+ 13"

== Stage 4 ==
16 May 2007 — Salerno to Montevergine di Mercogliano, 153 km (95 mi)

After the transfer to the Italian mainland, the peloton faced a medium mountain stage that concluded with the first-category climb to Montevergine di Mercogliano. The finish was highly technical, with over a dozen switchbacks.

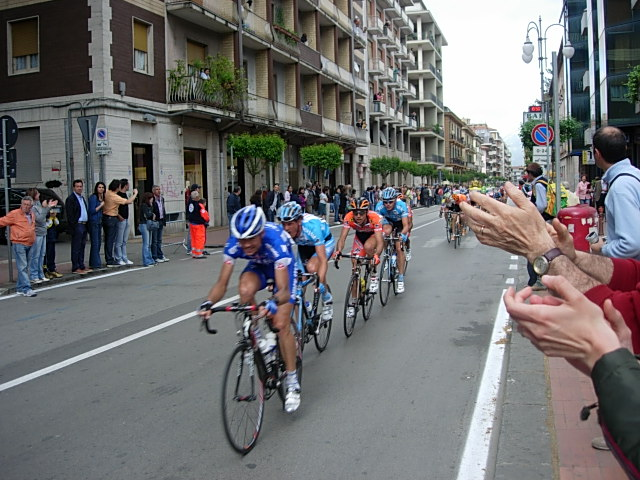
Riders on the way to Montevergine

With 33 km (21 mi) covered, AG2R Prévoyance's Yuriy Krivtsov instigated the day's breakaway, being joined by mountains classification leader Pavel Brutt, who was looking to add to his lead in that standing. Euskaltel–Euskadi's Markel Irizar joined them 5 km (3.1 mi) later. While Brutt did get maximum points on the third-category Picco San Angelo climb, the route prior to the Montevergine di Mercogliano climb was mostly flat, and the Saunier Duval–Prodir-paced main field caught the trio shortly after the climb began. Julio Alberto Pérez attacked for the stage win with 9 km (5.6 mi) left, and nearly held on to the finish line. With 800 m (2,600 ft) left, a group of nine passed up Pérez and contested the stage finish among themselves. Danilo Di Luca took off for the line with 200 m (660 ft) remaining to race. He had Riccardo Riccò and Damiano Cunego on his wheel, but neither came around him in the sprint, affording the Liquigas leader the stage win and, for the second time, the pink jersey. Di Luca had previously won a stage that ended on this climb in the 2001 Giro d'Italia. Being first on the category-one climb also gave Di Luca the green jersey; second-place man Riccò wore that jersey in the next two stages.

Stage 4 result

	Rider	Team	Time
1	Danilo Di Luca (ITA)	Liquigas	4h 22' 42"
2	Riccardo Riccò (ITA)	Saunier Duval–Prodir	s.t.
3	Damiano Cunego (ITA)	Lampre–Fondital	s.t.
4	Andy Schleck (LUX)	Team CSC	+ 3"
5	Stefano Garzelli (ITA)	Acqua & Sapone–Caffè Mokambo	+ 3"
6	Franco Pellizotti (ITA)	Liquigas	+ 6"
7	Luca Mazzanti (ITA)	Ceramica Panaria–Navigare	+ 6"
8	David Arroyo (ESP)	Caisse d'Epargne	+ 6"
9	Emanuele Sella (ITA)	Ceramica Panaria–Navigare	+ 13"
10	David Zabriskie (USA)	Team CSC	+ 13"

General classification after stage 4

	Rider	Team	Time
1	Danilo Di Luca (ITA)	Liquigas	14h 26' 10"
2	Franco Pellizotti (ITA)	Liquigas	+ 26"
3	Andrea Noè (ITA)	Liquigas	+ 35"
4	Vincenzo Nibali (ITA)	Liquigas	+ 35"
5	Andy Schleck (LUX)	Team CSC	+ 53"
6	Damiano Cunego (ITA)	Lampre–Fondital	+ 54"
7	David Zabriskie (USA)	Team CSC	+1' 03"
8	Paolo Savoldelli (ITA)	Astana	+1' 07"
9	Eddy Mazzoleni (ITA)	Astana	+1' 07"
10	Andrey Mizurov (KAZ)	Astana	+1' 07"

== Stage 5 ==
17 May 2007 — Teano to Frascati, 173 km (107 mi)

Stage five was mostly flat, but a third-category climb 15 km (9.3 mi) from the finish line had the potential to break up the field. The descent into the wine country town of Frascati was technical, covering twisting, turning roads to the finish line.

Tinkoff Credit Systems rider Mikhail Ignatiev was the day's first escapee. Mickaël Buffaz joined him after 15 km (9.3 mi), and the two quickly attained a five-minute advantage. Liquigas paced the main field for race leader Danilo Di Luca, and in the third hour of racing they tapped out a 45.1 km/h (28.0 mph) pace, cutting significantly into the breakaway's time gap. When Ignatiev realized that the main field was closing in on them, he attacked and came free of Buffaz, trying to solo to the finish line, but he was caught 18 km (11 mi) from the finish line. František Raboň, Matt White, Salvatore Commesso, and Elia Aggiano tried their luck within the final 10 km (6.2 mi), but none stayed away for more than a few minutes, and the widely expected mass sprint took place. Crédit Agricole's Angelo Furlan tried to execute a leadout for Thor Hushovd, but Alessandro Petacchi's train from Team Milram overran him. A chaotic sprint followed, with several riders having victory in their view. Gerolsteiner's Robert Förster was the first over the line for the win.

Stage 5 result

	Rider	Team	Time
1	Robert Förster (GER)	Gerolsteiner	4h 17' 02"
2	Thor Hushovd (NOR)	Crédit Agricole	s.t.
~~3~~	~~Alessandro Petacchi (ITA)~~	~~Team Milram~~	~~s.t.~~
4	Danilo Napolitano (ITA)	Lampre–Fondital	s.t.
5	Robbie McEwen (AUS)	Predictor–Lotto	s.t.
6	Alexandre Usov (BLR)	AG2R Prévoyance	s.t.
7	Maximiliano Richeze (ARG)	Ceramica Panaria–Navigare	s.t.
8	Alexandre Pichot (FRA)	Bouygues Télécom	s.t.
9	Juan José Haedo (ARG)	Team CSC	s.t.
10	Oscar Gatto (ITA)	Gerolsteiner	s.t.

General classification after stage 5

	Rider	Team	Time
1	Danilo Di Luca (ITA)	Liquigas	18h 43' 12"
2	Franco Pellizotti (ITA)	Liquigas	+ 26"
3	Andrea Noè (ITA)	Liquigas	+ 35"
4	Vincenzo Nibali (ITA)	Liquigas	+ 35"
5	Andy Schleck (LUX)	Team CSC	+ 53"
6	Damiano Cunego (ITA)	Lampre–Fondital	+ 54"
7	David Zabriskie (USA)	Team CSC	+1' 03"
8	Paolo Savoldelli (ITA)	Astana	+1' 07"
9	Eddy Mazzoleni (ITA)	Astana	+1' 07"
10	Andrey Mizurov (KAZ)	Astana	+1' 07"

== Stage 6 ==
18 May 2007 — Tivoli to Spoleto, 177 km (110 mi)

This medium mountain stage had three climbs, one in each category. The first-category Monte Terminillo crested a little after the halfway point of the stage, and with two climbs in the next 65 km (40 mi) afterward, pre-race analysis found this to be a stage conducive to a winning breakaway.

Wildcard teams Tinkoff Credit Systems and Ceramica Panaria–Navigare were active in early breakaway attempts, but no riders got clear until over an hour spent racing and 45 km (28 mi) were covered. Daniele Contrini instigated the day's breakaway at that point, and Marco Pinotti, Christophe Kern, Hubert Schwab, and Luis Felipe Laverde joined him. The breakaway was riding cohesively through the Monte Terminillo climb, and the Liquigas-led main field did not chase very hard to bring them back. Pinotti was the best-placed man in the break, 3'11" back of race leader Danilo Di Luca on the day. The group's advantage quickly exceeded three minutes, meaning Pinotti stood to become race leader if they stayed away. Laverde took the mountains points at the top of the Terminillo, and took the green jersey on the podium at day's end.

The group's advantage on the descent of the Terminillo was almost eight minutes, and it continued to rise for a time after that. Kern and Contrini had trouble keeping the pace with the leading group as the stage went on, with time trial specialist Pinotti setting a very fast pace. On the day's last climb, the second-category Forca d'Acero, Pinotti and Laverde distinguished themselves as the last remnants of the break, still seven minutes clear of the main field. Kern and Schwab were 90 seconds off the pace at the finish, with Contrini 3 minutes back. As the two leaders approached the finish line, Pinotti abided by an unwritten rule in cycling as he allowed Laverde to take the stage win, knowing that he (Pinotti) was going to take the overall race leadership. Alessandro Petacchi led the peloton home 7'09" behind Laverde.

Stage 6 result

	Rider	Team	Time
1	Luis Felipe Laverde (COL)	Ceramica Panaria–Navigare	4h 58' 23"
2	Marco Pinotti (ITA)	T-Mobile Team	s.t.
3	Christophe Kern (FRA)	Crédit Agricole	+1' 30"
4	Hubert Schwab (SUI)	Quick-Step–Innergetic	+1' 34"
5	Daniele Contrini (ITA)	Tinkoff Credit Systems	+3' 45"
6	Fortunato Baliani (ITA)	Ceramica Panaria–Navigare	+6' 55"
~~7~~	~~Alessandro Petacchi (ITA)~~	~~Team Milram~~	~~+7' 09"~~
8	Alexandre Usov (BLR)	AG2R Prévoyance	+7' 09"
9	Giuseppe Palumbo (ITA)	Acqua & Sapone–Caffè Mokambo	+7' 09"
10	Yuriy Krivtsov (UKR)	AG2R Prévoyance	+7' 09"

General classification after stage 6

	Rider	Team	Time
1	Marco Pinotti (ITA)	T-Mobile Team	23h 44' 32"
2	Hubert Schwab (SUI)	Quick-Step–Innergetic	+3' 30"
3	Danilo Di Luca (ITA)	Liquigas	+4' 12"
4	Franco Pellizotti (ITA)	Liquigas	+4' 38"
5	Andrea Noè (ITA)	Liquigas	+4' 47"
6	Vincenzo Nibali (ITA)	Liquigas	+4' 47"
7	Luis Felipe Laverde (COL)	Ceramica Panaria–Navigare	+4' 49"
8	Andy Schleck (LUX)	Team CSC	+5' 05"
9	Damiano Cunego (ITA)	Lampre–Fondital	+5' 06"
10	David Zabriskie (USA)	Team CSC	+5' 15"

== Stage 7 ==
19 May 2007 — Spoleto to Scarperia, 254 km (158 mi)

This was a long, flat stage, winding through the regions of Umbria and Tuscany. It included the third-category Valico Croce a Mori, but this climb was a good 55 km (34 mi) from the finish line, meaning it was unlikely to prevent a mass sprint from happening.

At the 9 km (5.6 mi) mark, a four-rider break formed, instigated again by a member of Tinkoff Credit Systems. This was Elio Aggiano, and he drew with him Swiss time trial specialist Rubens Bertogliati, Beñat Albizuri, and Fabien Patanchon. After 124 km (77 mi), they had 11 minutes on the main field. It was at this point that the teams of the sprinters set to making the chase. The time gap fell precipitously, and when Bertogliati topped Valico Croce a Mori in first position, the peloton was only one minute behind. Quick-Step–Innergetic and in particular their leader, reigning world champion Paolo Bettini, had made an aggressive chase on the ascent to try to soften the field. With 39 km (24 mi) left to race, the break was brought back into the main field. Matt White, Salvatore Commesso, and Fabian Cancellara tried to break away and solo to the finish line, but all were brought back. The Team Milram leadout train again delivered Alessandro Petacchi to the line first, though this was one of his many 2007 wins that was later stripped due to his irregular salbutamol test later in the race.

Stage 7 result

	Rider	Team	Time
~~1~~	~~Alessandro Petacchi (ITA)~~	~~Team Milram~~	~~6h 14' 44"~~
2	Thor Hushovd (NOR)	Crédit Agricole	s.t.
3	Paolo Bettini (ITA)	Quick-Step–Innergetic	s.t.
4	Danilo Napolitano (ITA)	Lampre–Fondital	s.t.
5	José Joaquín Rojas (ESP)	Caisse d'Epargne	s.t.
6	Alexandre Usov (BLR)	AG2R Prévoyance	s.t.
7	Maximiliano Richeze (ARG)	Ceramica Panaria–Navigare	s.t.
8	Enrico Gasparotto (ITA)	Liquigas	s.t.
9	Assan Bazayev (KAZ)	Astana	s.t.
10	Koldo Fernández (ESP)	Euskaltel–Euskadi	s.t.

General classification after stage 7

	Rider	Team	Time
1	Marco Pinotti (ITA)	T-Mobile Team	29h 59' 16"
2	Hubert Schwab (SUI)	Quick-Step–Innergetic	+3' 30"
3	Danilo Di Luca (ITA)	Liquigas	+4' 12"
4	Franco Pellizotti (ITA)	Liquigas	+4' 38"
5	Andrea Noè (ITA)	Liquigas	+4' 47"
6	Vincenzo Nibali (ITA)	Liquigas	+4' 47"
7	Luis Felipe Laverde (COL)	Ceramica Panaria–Navigare	+4' 49"
8	Andy Schleck (LUX)	Team CSC	+5' 05"
9	Damiano Cunego (ITA)	Lampre–Fondital	+5' 06"
10	David Zabriskie (USA)	Team CSC	+5' 15"

== Stage 8 ==
20 May 2007 — Barberino di Mugello to Fiorano Modenese, 200 km (120 mi)

This stage had two distinct halves. The first was hilly, with two categorized climbs and several uncategorized rises in elevation. After descending from the third-category Sestola climb, the peloton took in a flat second half of the stage en route to Fiorano Modenese. Once there, the stage concluded with a lap on the Fiorano Circuit, the private test track for Ferrari sports cars. The stage commemorated 60 years since the introduction of the first Ferrari.

At the 27 km (17 mi) mark, Predictor–Lotto rider Dario Cioni broke away, and instigated a big chase pack to come after him. Twenty-seven riders formed the day's principal break. The best-placed man in the group was Liquigas' Andrea Noè, who was 4' 47" back at the beginning of the day, meaning his position threatened that of race leader Marco Pinotti. The presence of Riccardo Riccò in the group meant that the peloton was likely to chase it down, as Riccò was an outside favorite for overall victory in the Giro. The other riders in the group repeatedly attacked to try to shed Riccò, and when his sporting director instructed him to drop back, Riccò rejoined the peloton. Five other riders also dropped back, leaving 21 out front. They worked cohesively to gain an advantage of seven minutes on the main field, keeping it at that gap for most of the stage. Pinotti's T-Mobile Team set to making the chase, but no other team helped, as they were the only team who had a vested interest in limiting the escape group's time gap. One team pulling the peloton was no match for 21 riders working together, and it quickly became clear that the breakaway would not be caught. They managed to pull back three minutes by the time the riders reached the Ferrari race track, meaning Pinotti was narrowly able to retain the pink jersey. Various members of the 21-strong leading group tried to attack for the stage win, with Tinkoff Credit Systems' Pavel Brutt away within the final kilometer, only to be overhauled by Emanuele Sella. Sella was in turn passed by world champion Paolo Bettini, but Team CSC's Kurt Asle Arvesen had ably held Bettini's wheel in the final kilometer and started his sprint at just the right time to win the stage. Pinotti's lead was reduced to under 30 seconds; he thanked teammates Lorenzo Bernucci, Axel Merckx and Aaron Olson for their hard pace-setting at the front of the peloton, but also noted that the team would need to ride better on subsequent days if they were to continue to keep the jersey.

Stage 8 result

	Rider	Team	Time
1	Kurt Asle Arvesen (NOR)	Team CSC	4h 44' 59"
2	Paolo Bettini (ITA)	Quick-Step–Innergetic	s.t.
3	Assan Bazayev (KAZ)	Astana	s.t.
4	Evgeni Petrov (RUS)	Tinkoff Credit Systems	s.t.
5	Dionisio Galparsoro (ESP)	Euskaltel–Euskadi	s.t.
6	George Hincapie (USA)	Discovery Channel	s.t.
7	Alessandro Spezialetti (ITA)	Liquigas	s.t.
8	Rinaldo Nocentini (ITA)	AG2R Prévoyance	s.t.
9	Emanuele Sella (ITA)	Ceramica Panaria–Navigare	s.t.
10	David Arroyo (ESP)	Caisse d'Epargne	s.t.

General classification after stage 8

	Rider	Team	Time
1	Marco Pinotti (ITA)	T-Mobile Team	34h 38' 34"
2	Andrea Noè (ITA)	Liquigas	+ 28"
3	Serguei Yakovlev (KAZ)	Astana	+ 54"
4	Marzio Bruseghin (ITA)	Lampre–Fondital	+1' 06"
5	Patxi Vila (ESP)	Lampre–Fondital	+1' 10"
6	José Luis Rubiera (ESP)	Discovery Channel	+1' 36"
7	David Arroyo (ESP)	Caisse d'Epargne	+1' 43"
8	Evgeni Petrov (RUS)	Tinkoff Credit Systems	+1' 51"
9	Dario Cioni (ITA)	Predictor–Lotto	+2' 13"
10	Alexandr Arekeev (RUS)	Acqua & Sapone–Caffè Mokambo	+2' 17"

== Stage 9 ==
21 May 2007 — Reggio Emilia to Lido di Camaiore, 177 km (110 mi)

After the second-category Passo del Cerreto, the course descended almost all the way to sea level and was flat to the finish. The finish was in Camaiore on the Ligurian coast, in the Italian Riviera.

The peloton took it easy for most of this stage. Their pace through two hours of racing was a paltry 27 km/h (17 mph). There was no significant breakaway in this time. Only the Passo del Cerreto climb spurred any combativity in the riders, as six, including mountains classification leader Luis Felipe Laverde broke away on the ascent. Four of them tried to soldier on for the stage win, but the teams of the sprinters, and the race leader's T-Mobile Team, worked well to keep the main field together. Team Milram tapped out a furious pace in the final 5 km (3.1 mi), reaching 61 km/h (38 mph) and forcing the peloton to ride single file. They continued their leadout in the last kilometer, for Alessandro Petacchi, but it was Danilo Napolitano who took the stage win. The overall standings were unchanged by the day's results.

Stage 9 result

	Rider	Team	Time
1	Danilo Napolitano (ITA)	Lampre–Fondital	4h 57' 08"
2	Robbie McEwen (AUS)	Predictor–Lotto	s.t.
~~3~~	~~Alessandro Petacchi (ITA)~~	~~Team Milram~~	~~s.t.~~
4	Paolo Bettini (ITA)	Quick-Step–Innergetic	s.t.
5	Koldo Fernández (ESP)	Euskaltel–Euskadi	s.t.
6	Thor Hushovd (NOR)	Crédit Agricole	s.t.
7	Maximiliano Richeze (ARG)	Ceramica Panaria–Navigare	s.t.
8	Hervé Duclos-Lassalle (FRA)	Cofidis	s.t.
9	Robert Förster (GER)	Gerolsteiner	s.t.
10	Juan José Haedo (ARG)	Team CSC	s.t.

General classification after stage 9

	Rider	Team	Time
1	Marco Pinotti (ITA)	T-Mobile Team	39h 45' 42"
2	Andrea Noè (ITA)	Liquigas	+ 28"
3	Serguei Yakovlev (KAZ)	Astana	+ 54"
4	Marzio Bruseghin (ITA)	Lampre–Fondital	+1' 06"
5	Patxi Vila (ESP)	Lampre–Fondital	+1' 10"
6	José Luis Rubiera (ESP)	Discovery Channel	+1' 36"
7	David Arroyo (ESP)	Caisse d'Epargne	+1' 43"
8	Evgeni Petrov (RUS)	Tinkoff Credit Systems	+1' 51"
9	Dario Cioni (ITA)	Predictor–Lotto	+2' 13"
10	Alexandr Arekeev (RUS)	Acqua & Sapone–Caffè Mokambo	+2' 17"

== Stage 10 ==
22 May 2007 — Camiaore to Santuario Nostra Signora della Guardia, 250 km (160 mi)

This was a difficult stage, long and with a lot of climbing. Two categorized climbs on course preceded the first-category summit stage finish at Santuario Nostra Signora Della Guardia. The course headed northwest from Camaiore through the Cinque Terre on the Ligurian coast, finishing with a 8.8 km (5.5 mi) climb with a steady 8% grade, and stretches reaching 14%.

In sharp contrast to the previous stage, the peloton rode very aggressively from the outset on this stage. Numerous breakaway attempts in the first two hours got free briefly, only to be brought back minutes later. The right move at the right time turned out to be Iván Parra, George Hincapie, Alberto Losada, Mauricio Ardila, Fortunato Baliani, and Hubert Dupont forming a six-rider break at the 70 km (43 mi) mark. Their lead exceeded 4 minutes at times, and at those points Hincapie was the virtual race leader, having entered the day 3' 04" behind Marco Pinotti. This advantage did not last for very long, being whittled down by the pink jersey group. The day's hot weather also took its toll on Ardila and Dupont, as they fell from the leading group and into one of the various trailing groups on the road.

The leaders had one minute on the Pinotti group as the ascent of the day's penultimate climb began. Hincapie flatted and was gapped between the two groups as the time gap was so small that team cars were not allowed between them. He managed to bridge back up to the remaining leaders Baliani, Parra, and Losada. Pinotti was dropped from the main chase group on this climb, finishing 36th on the stage and losing the pink jersey. The Liquigas had been pacing this group when their leader Danilo Di Luca attacked, which caused all group dynamics to be abandoned. Leonardo Piepoli responded to Di Luca's move and drew Andy Schleck with him. Piepoli stayed away for the stage win after shedding Schleck moments later. Di Luca passed Schleck for second on the stage, and with that result he regained the leadership of the mountains classification. His teammate Andrea Noè, the oldest rider in the Giro, was the new race leader.

Stage 10 result

	Rider	Team	Time
1	Leonardo Piepoli (ITA)	Saunier Duval–Prodir	6h 19' 07"
2	Danilo Di Luca (ITA)	Liquigas	+ 18"
3	Andy Schleck (LUX)	Team CSC	+ 27"
4	Gilberto Simoni (ITA)	Saunier Duval–Prodir	+ 32"
5	Riccardo Riccò (ITA)	Saunier Duval–Prodir	+ 41"
6	Paolo Savoldelli (ITA)	Astana	+ 41"
7	Damiano Cunego (ITA)	Lampre–Fondital	+ 43"
8	Franco Pellizotti (ITA)	Liquigas	+ 45"
9	Yaroslav Popovych (UKR)	Discovery Channel	+ 52"
10	Andrea Noè (ITA)	Liquigas	+ 52"

General classification after stage 10

	Rider	Team	Time
1	Andrea Noè (ITA)	Liquigas	46h 06' 09"
2	Marzio Bruseghin (ITA)	Lampre–Fondital	+1' 09"
3	David Arroyo (ESP)	Caisse d'Epargne	+1' 15"
4	Patxi Vila (ESP)	Lampre–Fondital	+1' 38"
5	Evgeni Petrov (RUS)	Tinkoff Credit Systems	+1' 48"
6	Emanuele Sella (ITA)	Ceramica Panaria–Navigare	+2' 04"
7	Serguei Yakovlev (KAZ)	Astana	+2' 06"
8	Danilo Di Luca (ITA)	Liquigas	+2' 58"
9	Marco Pinotti (ITA)	T-Mobile Team	+3' 11"
10	José Luis Rubiera (ESP)	Discovery Channel	+3' 22"

== Stage 11 ==
23 May 2007 — Serravalle Scrivia to Pinerolo, 198 km (123 mi)

This was a transitional stage, leaving the Ligurian coast, traveling through Langhe to end at the ancient crossroads city of Pinerolo.

The peloton stayed together through the first hour of racing. Mickaël Buffaz formed the day's breakaway at the 38 km (24 mi) mark. His maximum advantage over the main field was more than nine minutes, but he was easily caught. With 11 km (6.8 mi) left to race, Team Milram and Lampre–Fondital were drilling out a hard pace at the front of the main field, and absorbed Buffaz back into the peloton. The finish was contested in a classic bunched sprint, won by Alessandro Petacchi, though this was one of his many 2007 wins that was later stripped due to his irregular salbutamol levels in a test given after this stage. Wet pavement in the final meters caused Nikolay Trusov to skid out and crash, taking many other riders down with him. Among them was race leader Andrea Noè, who tumbled across the finish line on his backside, but retained the pink jersey.

Stage 11 result

	Rider	Team	Time
~~1~~	~~Alessandro Petacchi (ITA)~~	~~Team Milram~~	~~5h 46' 59"~~
2	Gabriele Balducci (ITA)	Acqua & Sapone–Caffè Mokambo	s.t.
3	Robbie McEwen (AUS)	Predictor–Lotto	s.t.
4	Thor Hushovd (NOR)	Crédit Agricole	s.t.
5	Danilo Napolitano (ITA)	Lampre–Fondital	s.t.
6	Angelo Furlan (ITA)	Crédit Agricole	s.t.
7	Koldo Fernández (ESP)	Euskaltel–Euskadi	s.t.
8	Alexandre Usov (BLR)	AG2R Prévoyance	s.t.
9	Robert Förster (GER)	Gerolsteiner	s.t.
10	Enrico Gasparotto (ITA)	Liquigas	s.t.

General classification after stage 11

	Rider	Team	Time
1	Andrea Noè (ITA)	Liquigas	51h 53' 08"
2	Marzio Bruseghin (ITA)	Lampre–Fondital	+1' 08"
3	David Arroyo (ESP)	Caisse d'Epargne	+1' 15"
4	Patxi Vila (ESP)	Lampre–Fondital	+1' 38"
5	Evgeni Petrov (RUS)	Tinkoff Credit Systems	+1' 48"
6	Emanuele Sella (ITA)	Ceramica Panaria–Navigare	+2' 04"
7	Serguei Yakovlev (KAZ)	Astana	+2' 06"
8	Danilo Di Luca (ITA)	Liquigas	+2' 58"
9	Marco Pinotti (ITA)	T-Mobile Team	+3' 11"
10	José Luis Rubiera (ESP)	Discovery Channel	+3' 22"
