= 2007 Giro d'Italia, Stage 12 to Stage 21 =

Cycling race stages

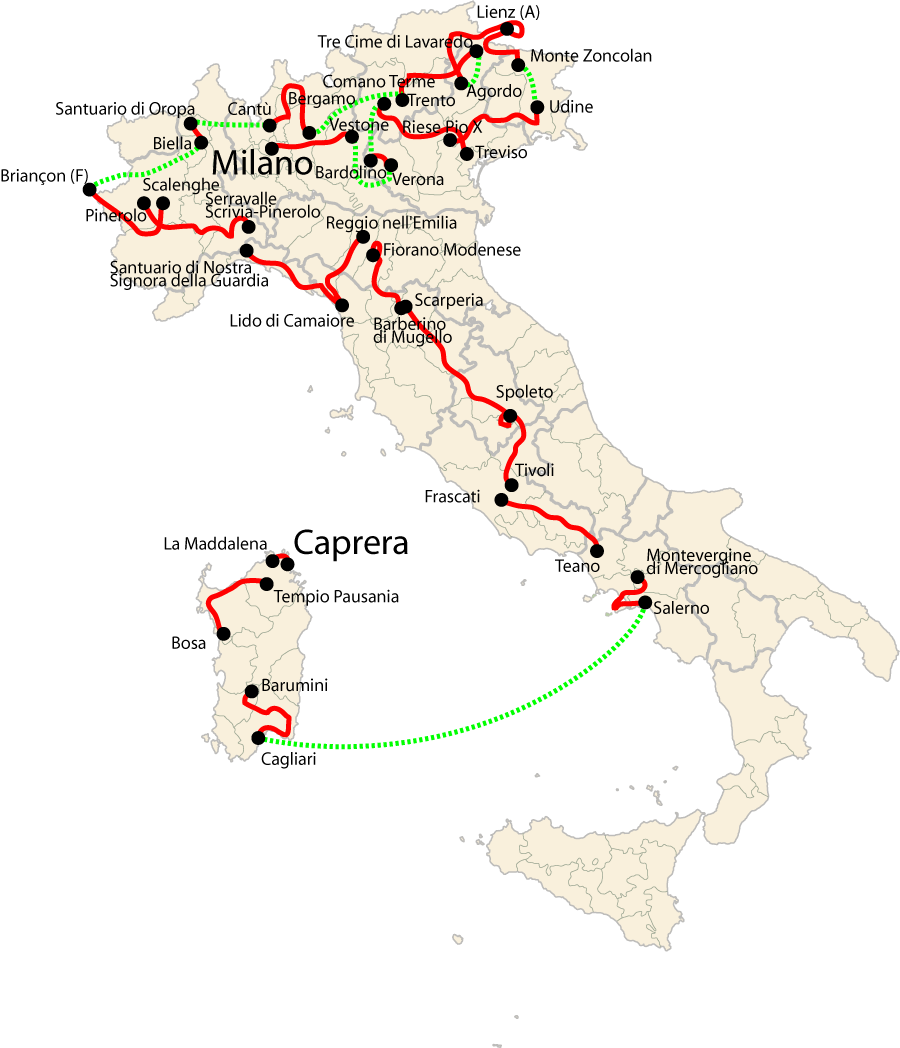
Overview of the stages; red lines represent distances covered in the individual stages, while green lines are the distances between the stages

Stage 12 of the 2007 Giro d'Italia took place on 24 May; the race concluded on 3 June. The second half of the Giro began with a challenging mountain stage that finished outside Italy, the first of three stages in this Giro that did so. This stage resulted in the race lead transferring from Andrea Noè to his teammate and team leader Danilo Di Luca, who did not relinquish this lead and finished the race as its champion.

The battle for the other two spots on the Giro podium also began in stage 12 but was not resolved until later in the race. Andy Schleck from Team CSC won the white jersey in Milan as the Giro's best rider under 25, and was in a competition with Eddy Mazzoleni, Gilberto Simoni, Damiano Cunego, and Riccardo Riccò to see who would round out the podium with Di Luca. It was in the marquee stages of the second half of the race that Schleck and Mazzoleni distinguished themselves as podium favorites, eventually finishing the race second and third overall, respectively. Saunier Duval–Prodir showed well, with Riccò and Simoni both taking mountain stage wins and Leonardo Piepoli winning the green jersey in Milan as the Giro's best climber.

Alessandro Petacchi from Team Milram won two stages in the second half of the Giro, and the points classification, but his subsequent disqualification for a non-negative salbutamol test given earlier in the race nullified these victories.

Legend
A pink jersey	Denotes the leader of the General classification	A green jersey	Denotes the leader of the Mountains classification
A violet jersey	Denotes the leader of the Points classification	A white jersey	Denotes the leader of the Young rider classification
	s.t. indicates that the rider crossed the finish line in the same group as the one receiving the time above him, and was therefore credited with the same finishing time.		

== Stage 12 ==
24 May 2007 – Scalenghe to Briançon (France), 163 km (101 mi)

This was the first major mountain stage of the Giro. The course included two difficult first-category climbs, as the route passed from Italy into France. The first of these climbs was the Colle dell'Agnello, which crested just inside the French border. This was the Cima Coppi, the highest climb in the race. The climb took stretched for 21.3 km (13.2 mi) and reached a vertical elevation of 2,744 m (9,003 ft). The Col d'Izoard later on is only marginally shorter and less steep, reaching 2,360 m (7,740 ft) in elevation after 14.2 km (8.8 mi) on the road, for a steady 7.1% gradient. The finish came on a steep descent into Briançon, a popular host town for the Tour de France.

This France-bound stage had a breakaway group consisting of two French riders each representing a French team: Yoann Le Boulanger of Bouygues Télécom and Christophe Riblon of AG2R Prévoyance. By the 55 km (34 mi) mark, the duo had a 17 and a half minute advantage on the peloton, as the other riders were conserving themselves for the big climbs ahead. The Saunier Duval–Prodir team, and in particular Leonardo Piepoli, did the pacemaking on the ascent of the Colle dell'Agnello, and after a few kilometers of the climb only a select group of overall favorites remained together as the first chase group. One surprising rider to crack was two-time Giro winner Paolo Savoldelli, who lost contact with the group of favorites 9 km (5.6 mi) from the summit of the Agnello and lost five minutes to them at day's end. Savoldelli was still hurt from the previous day's crash, and informed his lieutenant Eddy Mazzoleni that he should keep the pace for as long as he could and ride his own race, and that Savoldelli would look after himself.

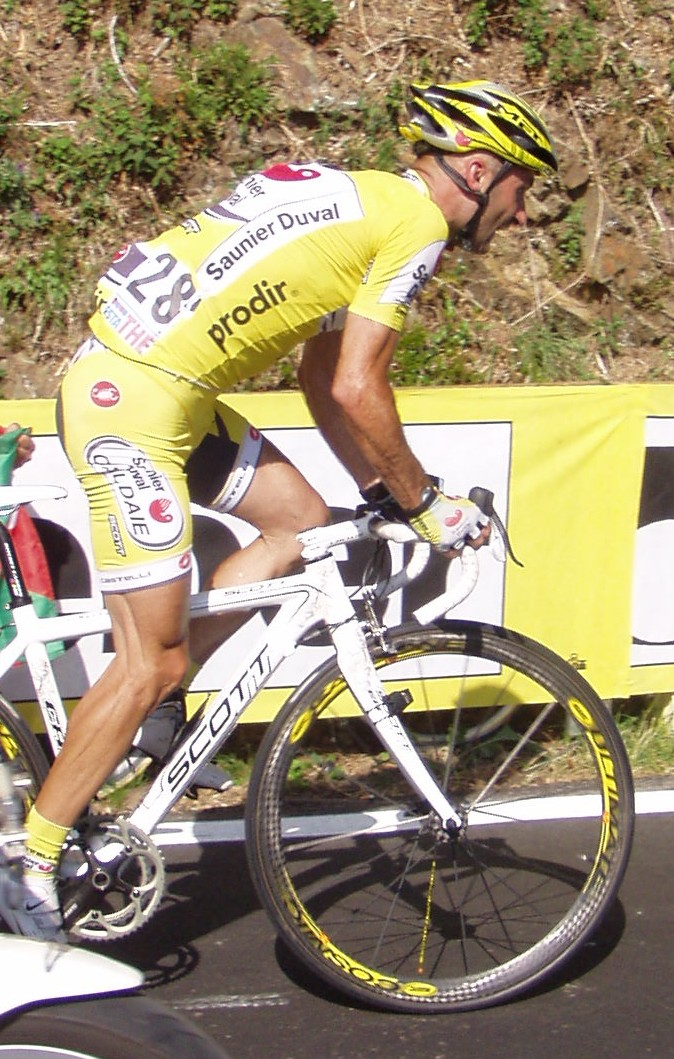
Leonardo Piepoli set a pace during this stage that cracked most of the main field.

In the front of the race, Le Boulanger was the first over the Agnello, winning the prize that went with conquering the Cima Coppi. Riblon followed 1'30" behind him; the group of overall favorites was still 13 minutes behind at the summit of the climb. Piepoli's pacemaking on the ascent had succeeded in whittling the group down to just himself, Gilberto Simoni, Damiano Cunego, Danilo Di Luca, Mazzoleni, Andy Schleck, and Stefano Garzelli. Riccardo Riccò, Savoldelli, Yaroslav Popovych, and overnight race leader Andrea Noè had all been in this group at the beginning of the climb, but were all eventually cracked by the pace.

Piepoli continued to pull the Simoni group through the descent from the Agnello and the beginning of the Iozard climb, absorbing Riblon in the process. Le Boulanger was alone in the front of the race as the ascent of the Iozard began, 3 minutes ahead of Simoni's group. With 11 km (6.8 mi) left in the climb, Piepoli broke away from the group he had been pacing, in a move to see who could match his acceleration. Di Luca and Schleck quickly made the bridge, with Simoni holding their wheels, but Cunego and Garzelli did not react as quickly and had to expend more energy to stay with the leaders. Later, Garzelli was dropped by this group's pace, and lost 2 minutes to them at the finish line. This group caught Le Boulanger 3.5 km (2.2 mi) before the summit of the Iozard.

Seconds before reaching that summit, Di Luca attacked from the leading group and came free, taking maximum mountains points and, more importantly, opening up a time gap. He opened up a 13-second lead on Schleck, Simoni, and Mazzoleni, and 25 to Cunego. Piepoli faded further and out of contention, at last hitting the wall after doing some strenuous pacemaking for much of this difficult stage. Simoni's descending skills brought himself, Schleck, and Mazzoleni back together with Di Luca minutes later, and they were together in Briançon for the stage finish. Di Luca attacked for the stage win 900 m (3,000 ft) from the finish line, after a sharp right-hand turn, and drew Schleck with him. Simoni went à bloc in his attempt to reach them, and did pass Schleck, but could not come around Di Luca, who won the stage. The others in the leading group of five finished scattered behind them. Lampre–Fondital's Marzio Bruseghin, who had begun the day second in the overall standings, was in the second chase group most of the day and finished 2'33" back, retaining second overall. Noè was 9'45" off the pace and surrendered the pink jersey to his team leader Di Luca. Di Luca still held the green jersey as mountains classification leader after the stage; Piepoli wore it in the next three stages.

Stage 12 result

	Rider	Team	Time
1	Danilo Di Luca (ITA)	Liquigas	4h 46' 39"
2	Gilberto Simoni (ITA)	Saunier Duval–Prodir	s.t.
3	Andy Schleck (LUX)	Team CSC	+ 7"
4	Eddy Mazzoleni (ITA)	Astana	+ 15"
5	Damiano Cunego (ITA)	Lampre–Fondital	+ 19"
6	Stefano Garzelli (ITA)	Acqua & Sapone–Caffè Mokambo	+2' 17"
7	Yoann Le Boulanger (FRA)	Bouygues Télécom	+2' 33"
8	Marzio Bruseghin (ITA)	Lampre–Fondital	+2' 33"
9	Riccardo Riccò (ITA)	Saunier Duval–Prodir	+2' 33"
10	Franco Pellizotti (ITA)	Liquigas	+2' 38"

General classification after stage 12

	Rider	Team	Time
1	Danilo Di Luca (ITA)	Liquigas	56h 42' 25"
2	Marzio Bruseghin (ITA)	Lampre–Fondital	+1' 03"
3	David Arroyo (ESP)	Caisse d'Epargne	+1' 16"
4	Andy Schleck (LUX)	Team CSC	+1' 25"
5	Patxi Vila (ESP)	Lampre–Fondital	+1' 39"
6	Damiano Cunego (ITA)	Lampre–Fondital	+2' 10"
7	Emanuele Sella (ITA)	Ceramica Panaria–Navigare	+2' 14"
8	Gilberto Simoni (ITA)	Saunier Duval–Prodir	+2' 34"
9	Evgeni Petrov (RUS)	Tinkoff Credit Systems	+2' 48"
10	Eddy Mazzoleni (ITA)	Astana	+3' 28"

== Stage 13 ==
25 May 2007 – Biella to Santuario di Oropa, 12.6 km (7.8 mi) (individual time trial)

The Giro's first individual time trial consisted entirely of the first-category climb to the Santuario di Oropa. The route was uphill all the way, gaining 734 m (2,408 ft) at an average gradient of 5.8%, with the steepest stretches reaching 13%. Though noted to be a difficult climb, it was expected that the short length of this stage would limit its effect on the overall standings.

The first rider of the day to post a time under 30 minutes was Ceramica Panaria–Navigare's Julio Alberto Pérez. His 29'38" was eventually bettered by American time trial specialist David Zabriskie, who stopped the clock at 29'14". Leonardo Piepoli started slowly, well behind Zabriskie at the 5 km (3.1 mi) intermediate time check, but finished strongly, gaining 4 seconds on Zabriskie at the 9 km (5.6 mi) check and 18 at the finish line. Tinkoff Credit Systems' Evgeni Petrov posted the best time at the first intermediate time check, but faded as the course wore on and could not beat Piepoli's time. Riccardo Riccò, Franco Pellizotti, Andy Schleck, Damiano Cunego, and Gilberto Simoni all posted solid times, but all fell short of overtaking Piepoli.

The last two men to take the course were Italian national time trial champion Marzio Bruseghin and race leader Danilo Di Luca. Bruseghin had the second best splits at the first two intermediate time checks and gained against Piepoli in the final 3 km (1.9 mi) where the others had lost time to him, winning the stage by a single second. Di Luca also rode well, finishing 8 seconds back of Bruseghin, and gaining time on his major rivals. After the stage, Simoni expressed disappointment that Piepoli was so narrowly defeated after having worked so hard the day before. Bruseghin held second overall after the stage and slightly narrowed his time gap to Di Luca, but made it clear that his focus going forward would be to work for team leader Cunego and not for any individual aspirations.

Stage 13 result

	Rider	Team	Time
1	Marzio Bruseghin (ITA)	Lampre–Fondital	28' 55"
2	Leonardo Piepoli (ITA)	Saunier Duval–Prodir	+ 1"
3	Danilo Di Luca (ITA)	Liquigas	+ 8"
4	David Zabriskie (USA)	Team CSC	+ 19"
5	Franco Pellizotti (ITA)	Liquigas	+ 22"
6	Stefano Garzelli (ITA)	Acqua & Sapone–Caffè Mokambo	+ 29"
7	Evgeni Petrov (RUS)	Tinkoff Credit Systems	+ 31"
8	Eddy Mazzoleni (ITA)	Astana	+ 33"
9	Damiano Cunego (ITA)	Lampre–Fondital	+ 38"
10	Andy Schleck (LUX)	Team CSC	+ 40"

General classification after stage 13

	Rider	Team	Time
1	Danilo Di Luca (ITA)	Liquigas	57h 11' 28"
2	Marzio Bruseghin (ITA)	Lampre–Fondital	+ 55"
3	Andy Schleck (LUX)	Team CSC	+1' 57"
4	Damiano Cunego (ITA)	Lampre–Fondital	+2' 40"
5	Patxi Vila (ESP)	Lampre–Fondital	+2' 44"
6	David Arroyo (ESP)	Caisse d'Epargne	+2' 51"
7	Evgeni Petrov (RUS)	Tinkoff Credit Systems	+3' 11"
8	Gilberto Simoni (ITA)	Saunier Duval–Prodir	+3' 32"
9	Emanuele Sella (ITA)	Ceramica Panaria–Navigare	+3' 52"
10	Eddy Mazzoleni (ITA)	Astana	+3' 53"

== Stage 14 ==
26 May 2007 – Cantù to Bergamo, 192 km (119 mi)

The first 85 km (53 mi) of this stage were flat, but two categorized climbs followed. The second-category Passo di San Marco and the third-category La Trinità-Dossena had a 20 km (12 mi) descent between them. Though a flat stretch followed to the finish, it was not likely that any sprinters would be present in the leading group to contest the stage.

The morning breakaway numbered eleven. During the flat stretch before the Passo di San Marco climb, Stefano Garzelli tried to use his team to soften the main field so he could attack and bridge up to the leaders, but team Liquigas, working for race leader Danilo Di Luca, nullified the move.

The group thinned after cresting the climb, leaving only Iván Parra, Paolo Bettini, and Fortunato Baliani just less than two minutes ahead of the pink jersey group, which contained all of the race's overall favorites. Garzelli and teammate Massimo Codol came free of this group on the ascent of La Trinità-Dossena and drew Gilberto Simoni and the powerful Astana duo of Eddy Mazzoleni and Paolo Savoldelli with them. The three breakaway riders were able to stay with them, forming a leading group of seven, after Codol dropped after doing some strenuous pacemaking. They built a 30-second advantage over the pink jersey group, as Liquigas was spent from their earlier effort to keep the race together. They kept their advantage over the other race favorites at that level for most of the stage, contesting a sprint finish among themselves 38 seconds ahead of Di Luca in eighth. Simoni opened the sprint first, with 250 m (820 ft) to go to the finish line, but as is so often the case, the first to go was not the winner. Garzelli passed him up with 60 m (200 ft) left and won his first Giro stage in three years. Simoni moved up from eighth to fifth after the stage, and several time gaps tightened with the day's results.

Stage 14 result

	Rider	Team	Time
1	Stefano Garzelli (ITA)	Acqua & Sapone–Caffè Mokambo	4h 58' 34"
2	Gilberto Simoni (ITA)	Saunier Duval–Prodir	s.t.
3	Paolo Bettini (ITA)	Quick-Step–Innergetic	s.t.
4	Fortunato Baliani (ITA)	Ceramica Panaria–Navigare	s.t.
5	Eddy Mazzoleni (ITA)	Astana	s.t.
6	Paolo Savoldelli (ITA)	Astana	+ 3"
7	Iván Parra (COL)	Cofidis	+ 3"
8	Danilo Di Luca (ITA)	Liquigas	+ 38"
9	Riccardo Riccò (ITA)	Saunier Duval–Prodir	+ 38"
10	Marzio Bruseghin (ITA)	Lampre–Fondital	+ 38"

General classification after stage 14

	Rider	Team	Time
1	Danilo Di Luca (ITA)	Liquigas	62h 10' 40"
2	Marzio Bruseghin (ITA)	Lampre–Fondital	+ 55"
3	Andy Schleck (LUX)	Team CSC	+1' 57"
4	Damiano Cunego (ITA)	Lampre–Fondital	+2' 40"
5	Gilberto Simoni (ITA)	Saunier Duval–Prodir	+2' 42"
6	Patxi Vila (ESP)	Lampre–Fondital	+2' 44"
7	David Arroyo (ESP)	Caisse d'Epargne	+2' 51"
8	Evgeni Petrov (RUS)	Tinkoff Credit Systems	+3' 11"
9	Eddy Mazzoleni (ITA)	Astana	+3' 15"
10	Emanuele Sella (ITA)	Ceramica Panaria–Navigare	+3' 52"

== Stage 15 ==
27 May 2007 – Trento to Tre Cime di Lavaredo, 184 km (114 mi)

This was the Giro's queen stage, featuring four categorized climbs along with an uncategorized 800 m (2,600 ft) wall early on. It concluded at the picturesque Tre Cime di Lavaredo with a demanding final climb, only 7.2 km (4.5 mi) long but with a steady 7.6% grade and stretches of over 20%.

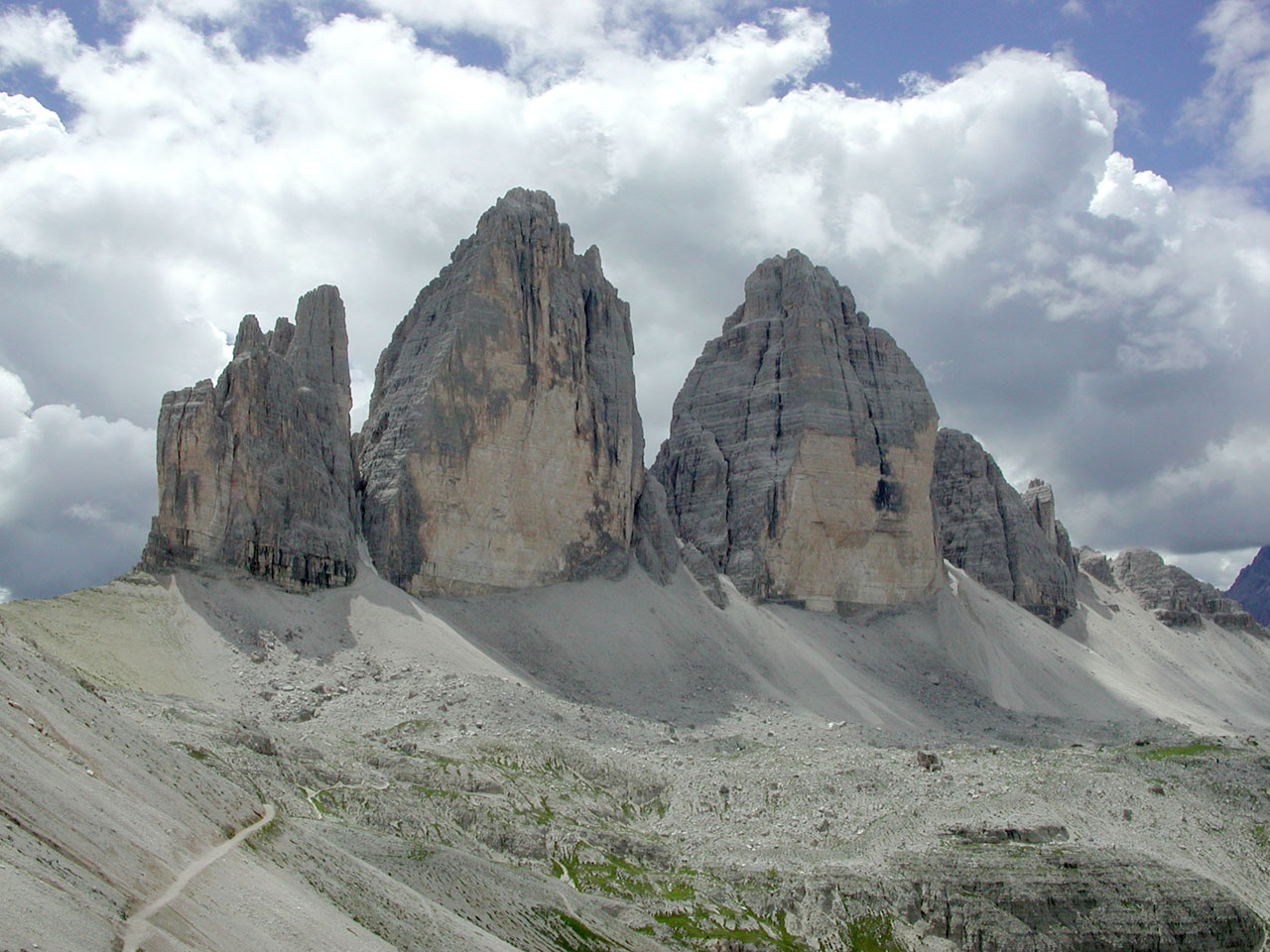
The Tre Cime di Lavaredo hosted the finish to this, the Giro's queen stage.

After a flurry of morning attacks and counterattacks resulted in no group coming clear, the right combination formed after close to an hour and 28 km (17 mi) covered. By the 40 km (25 mi) mark, the 22-strong breakaway representing 17 teams had three minutes on the main field. Their advantage eventually grew to nearly seven minutes, but with such difficult parcours ahead, they stood little chance of staying away.

After 5 km (3.1 mi) on the Passo di San Pellegrino, the day's first climb, Saunier Duval–Prodir sent Leonardo Piepoli and Riccardo Riccò on the attack. Iván Parra and Julio Alberto Pérez followed, and they quickly gapped the pink jersey group while trying to bridge up to the leaders. They reached the leading group after the descent of the San Pellegrino, holding four minutes on the pink jersey group at that time. Saunier Duval–Prodir rider David Cañada, part of the original big breakaway, set to the pacemaking once his two teammates joined the group, and tapped out a tempo that cracked about half of the group. When Cañada faded, Piepoli took his turn on the front of the group, at which time only Riccò, Pérez, Parra, and Michael Rasmussen were with him. Piepoli led them over the second-category Passo di Giau together, a little over three minutes ahead of the main field.

The pink jersey group was, during the Giau climb, some 50 riders strong until Paolo Savoldelli took a pull on the front, working for the better-placed Eddy Mazzoleni, that absolutely shattered it. Race leader Danilo Di Luca lost all of his support riders from the group, and overall contenders Damiano Cunego and Marzio Bruseghin were also quickly gapped. With 2.7 km (1.7 mi) remaining to the summit of the Giau, Di Luca put in an attack that further broke up the field. Savoldelli was gapped for a time, but his aggressive descent from the Giau brought him back to the pink jersey group, where he again took a strenuous pull on the front, softening up the contenders enough for himself and Mazzoleni to break free.

The intermediate sprint in Cortina d'Ampezzo resulted in Rasmussen coming out the back of the leading group. Savoldelli and Mazzoleni caught him in the road, and the Dutchman stayed with them to form a three-man chase group. Rain began to fall on the ascent of the Passo Tre Croci, the day's third climb, making the goings even more difficult. The leading group of four had 1'24" on the Mazzoleni group at the top of Passo Tre Croci and a further three minutes on the pink jersey group, meaning Mazzoleni was very nearly the virtual race leader on the road. Mazzoleni dropped Savoldelli and Rasmussen as the stage went on, and finished five minutes before them.

On the last ascent of the day, the Tre Cime di Lavaredo, Di Luca made up much of the ground he had in deficit to Mazzoleni on the road, conceding a minute and 24 seconds to him at the finish line. Gilberto Simoni, Damiano Cunego, and Andy Schleck finished just behind him. In the front of the race, Riccò attacked as the Lavaredo climb began and quickly got a 15-second gap. The only rider to bridge to him was his teammate Piepoli. Piepoli, having taken the lead outright in the mountains classification, allowed Riccò the stage win. Their team leader Simoni reflected after the stage that he thought their early break was foolhardy, and that he had not followed because he was focused only on the overall and not stages, but that he was happy that the team took the Giro's marquee stage.

The true difficulty of the stage was demonstrated by the time gaps and finishing groups. Most of the riders finished the stage alone; no more than five finished together. Only 18 other riders finished within ten minutes of Riccò's winning time, and 78 lost more than half an hour, with Bouygues Télécom's Franck Rénier last on the day 40 minutes and 10 seconds off the pace.

Stage 15 result

	Rider	Team	Time
1	Riccardo Riccò (ITA)	Saunier Duval–Prodir	5h 47' 22"
2	Leonardo Piepoli (ITA)	Saunier Duval–Prodir	s.t.
3	Iván Parra (COL)	Cofidis	+ 10"
4	Julio Alberto Pérez (MEX)	Ceramica Panaria–Navigare	+ 32"
5	Eddy Mazzoleni (ITA)	Astana	+1' 29"
6	Danilo Di Luca (ITA)	Liquigas	+2' 53"
7	Gilberto Simoni (ITA)	Saunier Duval–Prodir	+3' 30"
8	Damiano Cunego (ITA)	Lampre–Fondital	+3' 36"
9	Andy Schleck (LUX)]	Team CSC	+3' 52"
10	Emanuele Sella (ITA)	Ceramica Panaria–Navigare	+6' 03"

General classification after stage 15

	Rider	Team	Time
1	Danilo Di Luca (ITA)	Liquigas	68h 00' 55"
2	Eddy Mazzoleni (ITA)	Astana	+1' 51"
3	Andy Schleck (LUX)	Team CSC	+2' 56"
4	Gilberto Simoni (ITA)	Saunier Duval–Prodir	+3' 19"
5	Damiano Cunego (ITA)	Lampre–Fondital	+3' 23"
6	Riccardo Riccò (ITA)	Saunier Duval–Prodir	+3' 39"
7	David Arroyo (ESP)	Caisse d'Epargne	+6' 05"
8	Emanuele Sella (ITA)	Ceramica Panaria–Navigare	+7' 02"
9	Evgeni Petrov (RUS)	Tinkoff Credit Systems	+7' 29"
10	Marzio Bruseghin (ITA)	Lampre–Fondital	+9' 29"

== Stage 16 ==
29 May 2007 – Agordo to Lienz (Austria), 189 km (117 mi)

After the second rest day, the Giro returned with a rolling stage that entered Austria. The stage began with the second-category Passo di Campolongo and a long descent from it, but the remaining terrain was not difficult enough for any riders to open up significant time gaps. Pre-race analysis thus found it to be an ideal stage for a winning breakaway.

The peloton's pace in this stage was extremely lax. Through the first hour, they covered only 25.1 km (15.6 mi). The second hour was even slower, covering 24.6 km (15.3 mi). No breakaways were attempted in this time, save for a quick sprint for the mountains points available on the Passo di Campolongo. Through three hours, there was still no breakaway.

Finally, with only 70 km (43 mi) left in the stage, Benoît Joachim and Laurent Mangel came free. The Liquigas team at the head of the peloton was uninterested in chasing them down, since only a stage win was on offer this day, with the overall standings very unlikely to change. Little by little, sixteen others joined them. They did not work cohesively; Mangel, Stefano Garzelli, Ricardo Serrano, José Luis Rubiera, Pietro Caucchioli, and Pablo Lastras took two minutes' advantage over the other twelve. This mattered little, as the apathetic peloton let them all go to contest the stage amongst themselves. Garzelli put in an attack on the third-category Bannberg climb, 27 km (17 mi) from the end of the race, and stayed out front for the stage win. The main field, led home by László Bodrogi, was 8 minutes and 10 seconds back, but there was no significant change to the overall classification.

Stage 16 result

	Rider	Team	Time
1	Stefano Garzelli (ITA)	Acqua & Sapone–Caffè Mokambo	5h 34' 07"
2	Laurent Mangel (FRA)	AG2R Prévoyance	+1' 01"
3	Ricardo Serrano (ESP)	Tinkoff Credit Systems	+1' 01"
4	José Luis Rubiera (ESP)	Discovery Channel	+1' 01"
5	Pietro Caucchioli (ITA)	Crédit Agricole	+1' 01"
6	Pablo Lastras (ESP)	Caisse d'Epargne	+1' 01"
7	Salvatore Commesso (ITA)	Tinkoff Credit Systems	+2' 29"
8	Giovanni Visconti (ITA)	Quick-Step–Innergetic	+2' 29"
9	Assan Bazayev (KAZ)	Astana	+2' 29"
10	Lorenzo Bernucci (ITA)	T-Mobile Team	+2' 29"

General classification after stage 16

	Rider	Team	Time
1	Danilo Di Luca (ITA)	Liquigas	73h 43' 12"
2	Eddy Mazzoleni (ITA)	Astana	+1' 51"
3	Andy Schleck (LUX)	Team CSC	+2' 56"
4	Gilberto Simoni (ITA)	Saunier Duval–Prodir	+3' 19"
5	Damiano Cunego (ITA)	Lampre–Fondital	+3' 23"
6	Riccardo Riccò (ITA)	Saunier Duval–Prodir	+3' 39"
7	David Arroyo (ESP)	Caisse d'Epargne	+6' 05"
8	Emanuele Sella (ITA)	Ceramica Panaria–Navigare	+7' 02"
9	Evgeni Petrov (RUS)	Tinkoff Credit Systems	+7' 29"
10	Marzio Bruseghin (ITA)	Lampre–Fondital	+9' 29"

== Stage 17 ==
30 May 2007 – Lienz (Austria) to Monte Zoncolan, 142 km (88 mi)

This stage brought the riders back into Italy. It was short, but it ended at one of the most difficult climbs in the world, Monte Zoncolan. The climb gains 1,203 m (3,947 ft) in 10.1 km (6.3 mi) for a crushing average gradient of almost 12%, and stretches of up to 22%. The Giro previously passed over the Zoncolan in 2003, in a stage won by Gilberto Simoni en route to overall victory.

Race leader Danilo Di Luca's Liquigas team covered many early breakaway attempts. After 25 km (16 mi), a dozen-strong breakaway group formed. Their pace was frantic, coming to the stage's intermediate sprint 20 minutes faster than the fastest time predicted by Giro organizers. They had five and a half minutes on the pink jersey group containing race favorites at this point, and three and a half minutes on them at the beginning of the Zoncolan climb.

Jussi Veikkanen, Massimo Codol, and Mauricio Ardila took pulls at the front of the breakaway group, but 2 km (1.2 mi) into the climb, only Dario Cioni, Fortunato Baliani, and Mario Aerts remained out front. Another kilometer later, Cioni was the lone leader. Franco Pellizotti was the last Liquigas rider left for Di Luca in the group of favorites, before he cracked and also fell off the pace. With 5 km (3.1 mi) left in the climb, Simoni himself came to the front of the group and tapped out a pace that left everyone but teammate Leonardo Piepoli and best young rider Andy Schleck behind. They passed Cioni and chaser Codol on the road, and the Saunier Duval–Prodir duo left the young Luxembourger behind them to contest the stage themselves. Since the climb had personal significance for Simoni, Piepoli allowed him to cross the line first. They had covered the 10.1 km (6.3 mi) climb in 39'05", for a paltry pace of 15.05 km/h (9.35 mph). The win moved Simoni into a podium position, in third, and moved Schleck into second overall.

Stage 17 result

	Rider	Team	Time
1	Gilberto Simoni (ITA)	Saunier Duval–Prodir	3h 51' 52"
2	Leonardo Piepoli (ITA)	Saunier Duval–Prodir	s.t.
3	Andy Schleck (LUX)	Team CSC	+ 7"
4	Danilo Di Luca (ITA)	Liquigas	+ 31"
5	Damiano Cunego (ITA)	Lampre–Fondital	+ 37"
6	Massimo Codol (ITA)	Acqua & Sapone–Caffè Mokambo	+ 58"
7	Julio Alberto Pérez (MEX)	Ceramica Panaria–Navigare	+1' 19"
8	Franco Pellizotti (ITA)	Liquigas	+1' 40"
9	Marzio Bruseghin (ITA)	Lampre–Fondital	+1' 57"
10	Iván Parra (COL)	Cofidis	+2' 02"

General classification after stage 17

	Rider	Team	Time
1	Danilo Di Luca (ITA)	Liquigas	77h 35' 35"
2	Andy Schleck (LUX)	Team CSC	+2' 24"
3	Gilberto Simoni (ITA)	Saunier Duval–Prodir	+2' 28"
4	Damiano Cunego (ITA)	Lampre–Fondital	+3' 29"
5	Eddy Mazzoleni (ITA)	Astana	+3' 46"
6	Riccardo Riccò (ITA)	Saunier Duval–Prodir	+5' 19"
7	David Arroyo (ESP)	Caisse d'Epargne	+10' 00"
8	Evgeni Petrov (RUS)	Tinkoff Credit Systems	+10' 25"
9	Franco Pellizotti (ITA)	Liquigas	+10' 39"
10	Marzio Bruseghin (ITA)	Lampre–Fondital	+10' 55"

== Stage 18 ==
31 May 2007 – Udine to Riese Pio X, 203 km (126 mi)

The 18th stage was completely flat, and was sure to be contested by the Giro's remaining sprinters.

A great number of early breakaways were attempted and neutralized in the stage's first hour. Finally, seven broke away at the 37 km (23 mi) mark. The seven, Addy Engels, Maxim Gourov, Patxi Vila, Franck Rénier, Éric Berthou, Pedro Horrillo and Mikhail Ignatiev, got a maximum advantage of 2'30", but the peloton easily caught them 5 km (3.1 mi) from the finish line. AG2R Prévoyance tried to set up the sprint for Alexandre Usov, as did Quick-Step–Innergetic for Matteo Tosatto, who lived in the town where the stage finished. AG2R's leadout train took a left-hand turn in the final kilometer too sharply, and left a handful of riders to contest the stage alone. Since the crash occurred within the final 3 km (1.9 mi), no time was counted as lost. Alessandro Petacchi easily held off Maximiliano Richeze and Matti Breschel for the victory, though this was one of his many 2007 wins that was later stripped due to his irregular salbutamol levels in a test given earlier in the race. The overall standings were unchanged by the day's results.

Stage 18 result

	Rider	Team	Time
~~1~~	~~Alessandro Petacchi (ITA)~~	~~Team Milram~~	~~4h 32' 51"~~
2	Maximiliano Richeze (ARG)	Ceramica Panaria–Navigare	s.t.
3	Matti Breschel (DEN)	Team CSC	s.t.
4	Thomas Fothen (GER)	Gerolsteiner	s.t.
5	Oscar Gatto (ITA)	Gerolsteiner	s.t.
6	Nikolay Trusov (RUS)	Tinkoff Credit Systems	s.t.
7	Alexandre Pichot (FRA)	Bouygues Télécom	s.t.
8	Stefano Zanini (ITA)	Predictor–Lotto	s.t.
9	Julian Dean (NZL)	Crédit Agricole	s.t.
10	Hervé Duclos-Lassalle (FRA)	Cofidis	s.t.

General classification after stage 18

	Rider	Team	Time
1	Danilo Di Luca (ITA)	Liquigas	82h 08' 26"
2	Andy Schleck (LUX)	Team CSC	+2' 24"
3	Gilberto Simoni (ITA)	Saunier Duval–Prodir	+2' 28"
4	Damiano Cunego (ITA)	Lampre–Fondital	+3' 29"
5	Eddy Mazzoleni (ITA)	Astana	+3' 46"
6	Riccardo Riccò (ITA)	Saunier Duval–Prodir	+5' 19"
7	David Arroyo (ESP)	Caisse d'Epargne	+10' 00"
8	Evgeni Petrov (RUS)	Tinkoff Credit Systems	+10' 25"
9	Franco Pellizotti (ITA)	Liquigas	+10' 39"
10	Marzio Bruseghin (ITA)	Lampre–Fondital	+10' 55"

== Stage 19 ==
1 June 2007 – Treviso to Terme di Comano, 179 km (111 mi)

Two categorized climbs occurred on this course, but since the stage took place one day before a long and likely crucial individual time trial, pre-race analysis determined this stage likely to be decided by a breakaway.

A breakaway group involving double stage winner Stefano Garzelli got away after 27 km (17 mi), but was brought back 34 km (21 mi) later after never having more than 45 seconds on the main field. Iban Mayo and Alberto Losada counter-attacked when the original break was brought in, and stayed out front for much of the stage. Liquigas rode tempo through the 98 km (61 mi) mark, until Leonardo Piepoli put in an attack for maximum mountains points on the second-category Pian del Fugazze. He was caught shortly thereafter, but the pace he set severely thinned the pink jersey group.

A chase group of five riders formed between the pink jersey group and Mayo and Losada in the front of the race, but they were never able to make the bridge. Losada cracked on the day's final climb and finished 4 minutes behind Mayo, the stage winner. Evgeni Petrov, who began the day in eighth place overall, was part of the chase group and gained sufficient time to move into seventh place at day's end.

Stage 19 result

	Rider	Team	Time
1	Iban Mayo (ESP)	Saunier Duval–Prodir	4h 34' 39"
2	Giovanni Visconti (ITA)	Quick-Step–Innergetic	+ 43"
3	Marco Marzano (ITA)	Lampre–Fondital	+1' 04"
4	Michael Rasmussen (DEN)	Rabobank	+1' 08"
5	Evgeni Petrov (RUS)	Tinkoff Credit Systems	+1' 08"
6	Mario Aerts (BEL)	Predictor–Lotto	+2' 54"
7	Lorenzo Bernucci (ITA)	T-Mobile Team	+2' 58"
8	Maximiliano Richeze (ARG)	Ceramica Panaria–Navigare	+3' 13"
9	Lilian Jégou (FRA)	Française des Jeux	+3' 13"
10	Josep Jufré (ESP)	Predictor–Lotto	+3' 13"

General classification after stage 19

	Rider	Team	Time
1	Danilo Di Luca (ITA)	Liquigas	86h 46' 28"
2	Andy Schleck (LUX)	Team CSC	+2' 24"
3	Gilberto Simoni (ITA)	Saunier Duval–Prodir	+2' 28"
4	Damiano Cunego (ITA)	Lampre–Fondital	+3' 29"
5	Eddy Mazzoleni (ITA)	Astana	+3' 46"
6	Riccardo Riccò (ITA)	Saunier Duval–Prodir	+5' 19"
7	Evgeni Petrov (RUS)	Tinkoff Credit Systems	+8' 20"
8	David Arroyo (ESP)	Caisse d'Epargne	+10' 00"
9	Franco Pellizotti (ITA)	Liquigas	+10' 39"
10	Marzio Bruseghin (ITA)	Lampre–Fondital	+10' 55"

== Stage 20 ==
2 June 2007 – Bardolino to Verona, 43 km (27 mi) (individual time trial)

The race's second individual time trial was fairly straightforward, albeit long. It was mostly flat and did not have many turns in the road, thus favoring traditional time trial specialists for the stage win.

Mikhail Ignatiev set the first competitive time of the day. His 54'21" was almost two minutes better than the times that had come before him. Not long after came United States national time trial champion David Zabriskie, who bettered Ignatiev's time at all three intermediate time checks and was over a minute better than him at the finish, the first rider under 53 minutes on the day. Paolo Savoldelli came a little later and stopped the clock in 52'20".

Later on, the race's overall favorites took to the road not expressly for the stage win, but rather to iron out the race's overall standings. Savoldelli's teammate Eddy Mazzoleni rode one of the best time trials of his career, 2 seconds better than Zabriskie and 36 back of his teammate to move up from fifth to third overall. Damiano Cunego and Gilberto Simoni, both noted as relatively weak time trialists, lost out on their chances for the podium because of Mazzoleni's ride and settled among themselves the battle for fourth place. Cunego's 54'37" meant Simoni would have to come home better than 55'38" to stay better than his rival. Simoni's time was 55'03", and he remained ahead of Cunego. Danilo Di Luca and Andy Schleck also rode strong time trials, to preserve their places on top of the overall classification with a ceremonial final stage left to race.

Stage 20 result

	Rider	Team	Time
1	Paolo Savoldelli (ITA)	Astana	52' 20"
2	Eddy Mazzoleni (ITA)	Astana	+ 36"
3	David Zabriskie (USA)	Team CSC	+ 38"
4	László Bodrogi (HUN)	Crédit Agricole	+1' 08"
5	Marzio Bruseghin (ITA)	Lampre–Fondital	+1' 16"
6	Andy Schleck (LUX)	Team CSC	+1' 28"
7	Vincenzo Nibali (ITA)	Liquigas	+1' 44"
8	Danilo Di Luca (ITA)	Liquigas	+1' 57"
9	Mikhail Ignatiev (RUS)	Tinkoff Credit Systems	+2' 01"
10	Franco Pellizotti (ITA)	Liquigas	+2' 02"

General classification after stage 20

	Rider	Team	Time
1	Danilo Di Luca (ITA)	Liquigas	87h 40' 45"
2	Andy Schleck (LUX)	Team CSC	+1' 55"
3	Eddy Mazzoleni (ITA)	Astana	+2' 25"
4	Gilberto Simoni (ITA)	Saunier Duval–Prodir	+3' 15"
5	Damiano Cunego (ITA)	Lampre–Fondital	+3' 49"
6	Riccardo Riccò (ITA)	Saunier Duval–Prodir	+7' 00"
7	Evgeni Petrov (RUS)	Tinkoff Credit Systems	+8' 34"
8	Marzio Bruseghin (ITA)	Lampre–Fondital	+10' 14"
9	Franco Pellizotti (ITA)	Liquigas	+10' 44"
10	David Arroyo (ESP)	Caisse d'Epargne	+11' 58"

== Stage 21 ==
3 June 2007 – Vestone to Milan, 185 km (115 mi)

The final stage was flat, containing, per tradition, one early categorized climb. It ended with ten circuits on the Corso Venezia in Milan preceding a mass sprint finish.

Kurt Asle Arvesen and Daniele Contrini briefly broke away early in the stage, but they did not seriously seek to stay away. The peloton was together into Milan. Various breakaway attempts occurred on the Milan circuit, but none succeeded. Alessandro Petacchi won the resultant field sprint, though this was one of his many 2007 wins that was later stripped due to his irregular salbutamol levels in a test given earlier in the race. There were no significant changes to the race's standings, so Danilo Di Luca became the Giro champion.

Stage 21 result

	Rider	Team	Time
~~1~~	~~Alessandro Petacchi (ITA)~~	~~Team Milram~~	~~5h 18' 54"~~
2	Maximiliano Richeze (ARG)	Ceramica Panaria–Navigare	s.t.
3	Paolo Bettini (ITA)	Quick-Step–Innergetic	s.t.
4	Giuseppe Palumbo (ITA)	Acqua & Sapone–Caffè Mokambo	s.t.
5	Stefano Zanini (ITA)	Predictor–Lotto	s.t.
6	Lloyd Mondory (FRA)	AG2R Prévoyance	s.t.
7	Alexandre Usov (BLR)	AG2R Prévoyance	s.t.
8	Oscar Gatto (ITA)	Gerolsteiner	s.t.
9	Thomas Fothen (GER)	Gerolsteiner	s.t.
10	Matti Breschel (DEN)	Team CSC	s.t.

Final general classification

	Rider	Team	Time
1	Danilo Di Luca (ITA)	Liquigas	92h 59' 39"
2	Andy Schleck (LUX)	Team CSC	+1' 55"
3	Eddy Mazzoleni (ITA)	Astana	+2' 25"
4	Gilberto Simoni (ITA)	Saunier Duval–Prodir	+3' 15"
5	Damiano Cunego (ITA)	Lampre–Fondital	+3' 49"
6	Riccardo Riccò (ITA)	Saunier Duval–Prodir	+7' 00"
7	Evgeni Petrov (RUS)	Tinkoff Credit Systems	+8' 34"
8	Marzio Bruseghin (ITA)	Lampre–Fondital	+10' 14"
9	Franco Pellizotti (ITA)	Liquigas	+10' 44"
10	David Arroyo (ESP)	Caisse d'Epargne	+11' 58"
