= 2007 Giro d'Italia =

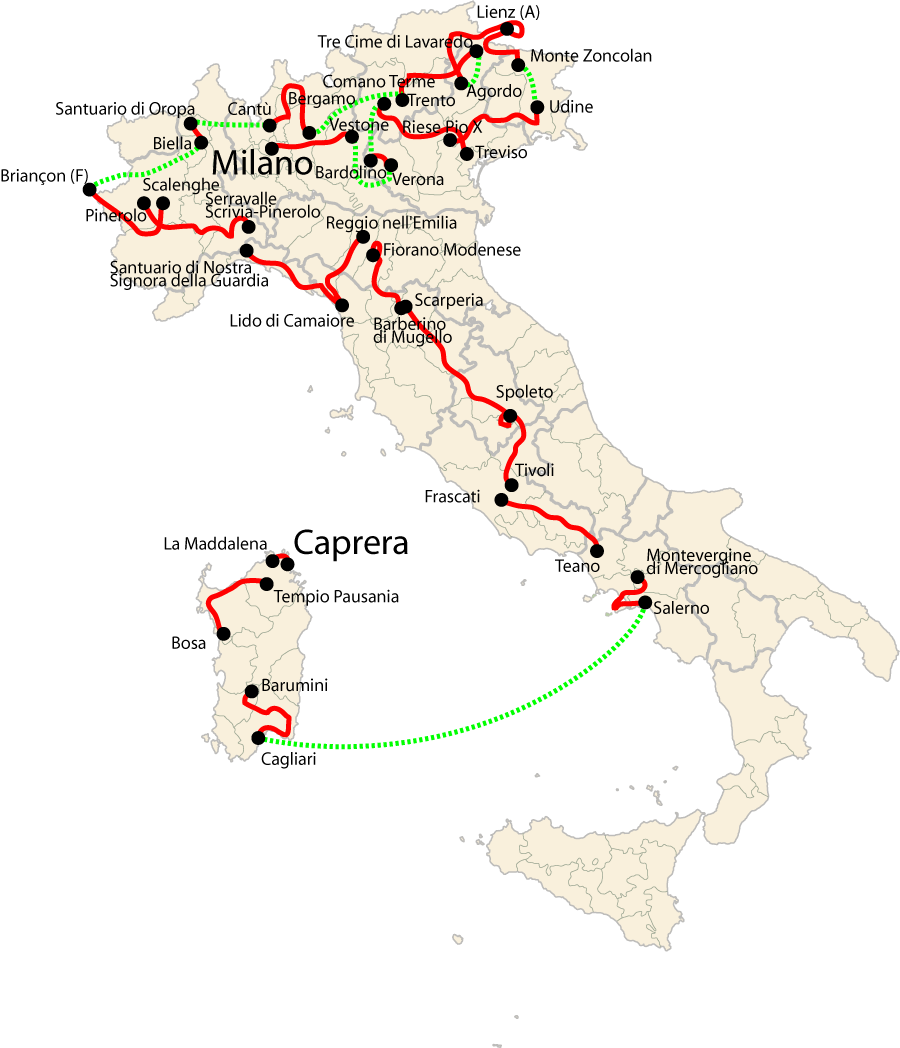
- Overview of the stages: route from Caprera, in Sardinia, to Milan covered by the riders on the bicycle (red) and distances between stages (green).

Race details
- Dates: 12 May – 3 June 2007
- Stages: 21
- Distance: 3,486 km (2,166 mi)
- Winning time: 92h 59' 39"

Results
Jersey awarded to the overall winner	Winner	Danilo Di Luca (ITA)	(Liquigas)
	Second	Andy Schleck (LUX)	(Team CSC)
	Third	Eddy Mazzoleni (ITA)	(Astana)
Jersey awarded to the points classification winner	Points	~~Alessandro Petacchi~~ none	
Jersey awarded to the mountains classification winner	Mountains	Leonardo Piepoli (ITA)	(Saunier Duval–Prodir)
Jersey awarded to the young rider classification winner	Young rider	Andy Schleck (LUX)	(Team CSC)
	Sprints	Mikhail Ignatiev (RUS)	(Tinkoff Credit Systems)
Jersey awarded to the combativity classification winner	Combativity	~~Alessandro Petacchi~~ none	
	Team	Saunier Duval–Prodir	
	Team points	Lampre–Fondital	

The 2007 Giro d'Italia was the 90th running of the Giro d'Italia, one of cycling's Grand Tours. It took place from 12 May to 3 June 2007. The race began in Sardinia and finished in Milan, and featured five mountain top finishes, of which one was an individual time trial. The race also visited France and Austria in three stages.

Danilo Di Luca of the Liquigas team won the race, with Andy Schleck from Team CSC and Eddy Mazzoleni from Astana rounding out the podium. Schleck also won the youth classification, which featured in the Giro for the first time since 1994. Di Luca's team dominated the overall classification, holding the race leader's pink jersey for 17 of the 21 stages.

During the race, Alessandro Petacchi tested positive for elevated levels of salbutamol at a doping control on 23 May, after winning Stage 11. Petacchi has a medical exemption to use salbutamol in the treatment of asthma, but the concentration of the drug in his urine sample from this control was above the therapeutically accepted level. Though the Italian Cycling Federation originally refused to punish him, the Italian National Olympic Committee appealed the case to the Court of Arbitration for Sport, resulting in a suspension for the rider and forfeiture of all his results from the Giro.

== Teams ==
The Giro, along with the season's other Grand Tours (the Tour de France and the Vuelta a España), was one of several events run in 2007 as a UCI ProTour event but without a ProTour license. This meant that while ProTour points were awarded in the race, the organizers were not obligated to invite the 20 ProTour teams. Nineteen of the twenty ProTour teams, Unibet.com being the exception, were invited, with three UCI Professional Continental teams rounding out the event's 22-team peloton. Each team entered nine riders, so the race began with 198 in total.

The 22 teams who took part in the race were:

- Acqua & Sapone–Caffè Mokambo
- AG2R Prévoyance
- Astana
- Bouygues Télécom
- Caisse d'Epargne
- Ceramica Panaria–Navigare
- Cofidis
- Crédit Agricole
- Discovery Channel
- Euskaltel–Euskadi
- Française des Jeux
- Gerolsteiner
- Lampre–Fondital
- Liquigas
- Predictor–Lotto
- Quick-Step–Innergetic
- Rabobank
- Saunier Duval–Prodir
- T-Mobile Team
- Team CSC
- Team Milram
- Tinkoff Credit Systems

== Pre-race favorites ==
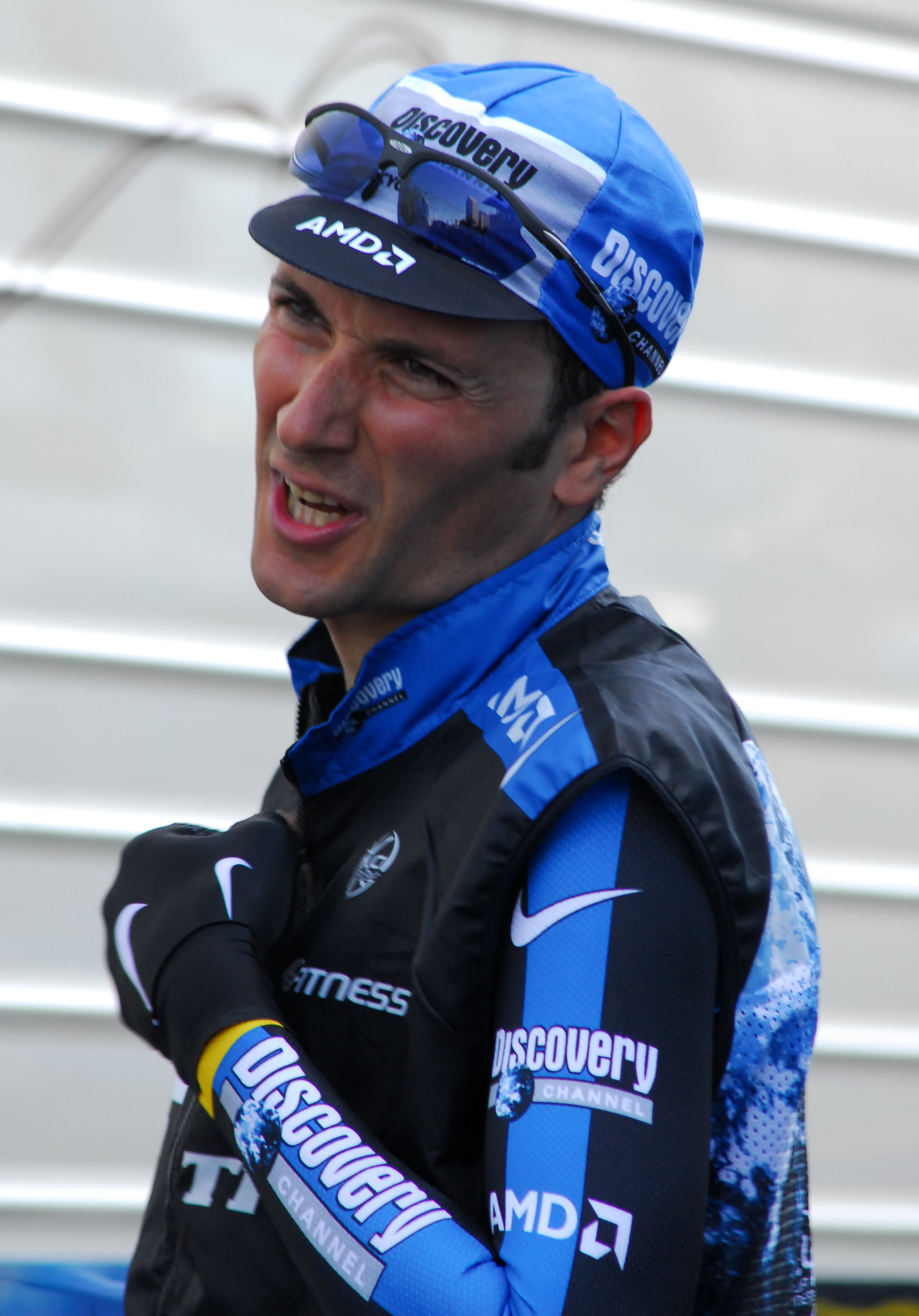
Defending Giro champion Ivan Basso originally intended to seek overall victory in this event with the Discovery Channel team, but he pulled out of the race before it began.

In the months leading up to the Giro, headlines centered on defending champion Ivan Basso. After having been removed from Team CSC's start list for the 2006 Tour de France due to his apparent involvement in the Operación Puerto doping case, Basso and Team CSC mutually agreed on the termination of his contract with them. Days later, Basso appeared to be cleared of any connection to Puerto, as the Italian Cycling Federation (FCI) shelved his case, and he signed with Discovery Channel. He rode part of the 2007 season with Discovery, and had intended to seek overall victory both in this Giro and in the 2007 Tour de France with his new team. In April 2007, Basso's case was re-opened by the FCI, a step rarely taken on cases formally shelved. Facing further investigations into his involvement with the doping ring, team Discovery asked him to stop racing late in April. Shortly afterward, just two weeks before the Giro was to begin, Basso terminated his contract with Discovery, meaning the Giro started without its defending champion. Basso subsequently admitted to planning on doping in the 2006 Tour, and the FCI handed him a two-year suspension, with credit for time already served in 2006 after he was first connected to the doping ring. Paolo Bettini, the reigning world champion, wore bib number one in Basso's place.

Basso's removal left wide open the possibilities for overall victory in this Giro. Four former Giro winners started this race – Damiano Cunego, Paolo Savoldelli, Gilberto Simoni, and Stefano Garzelli – and they were expected to be among the favorites. Simoni's Saunier Duval–Prodir team was noted to contain many strong climbers, including Riccardo Riccò and Leonardo Piepoli. The passage of the Giro over Monte Zoncolan, where Simoni won a stage en route to overall victory in the 2003 Giro d'Italia, was also noted as a factor in his favor. Classics specialist Danilo Di Luca of Liquigas was also named as a contender, chiefly because of his strong team. Further riders named as contenders included Pietro Caucchioli and Yaroslav Popovych.

The most high-profile sprinters lined up to begin the 2007 Giro were Alessandro Petacchi and Robbie McEwen. They, along with countrymen Mario Cipollini and Baden Cooke, had had a back-and-forth rivalry for sprinting supremacy that had gone back several years but had been stunted in 2006 when Petacchi missed most of the season, including all but the first three stages of the Giro, due to a fractured kneecap sustained from a crash. One pre-race analysis viewed Petacchi's 2007 Giro and season as a chance at redemption for him. Other fast men in the race noted to be contenders in the flat stages included two-time points classification winner Bettini, Danilo Napolitano, and Graeme Brown.

== Route and stages ==
Race director Angelo Zomegnan commented that the route was designed to be easier than that of the extremely climbing-intensive 2006 Giro. The Giro's twenty-one stages were divided into the following classifications: three time trials (one team and two individual), eleven flat or undulating stages (officially there was no distinction made between flat and undulating), four intermediate stages, and three mountain stages. The race began with a team time trial on the island of Sardinia. This was followed by two flat stages and an unusually early rest day to transfer from Sardinia to Italy's mainland. The riders transferred by plane while the Giro caravan, race officials and team cars made the trip by boat. The final stage, as was tradition, was a flat, mostly ceremonial road stage to Milan, finishing with ten circuits on the Corso Venezia of the Via Montenapoleone.

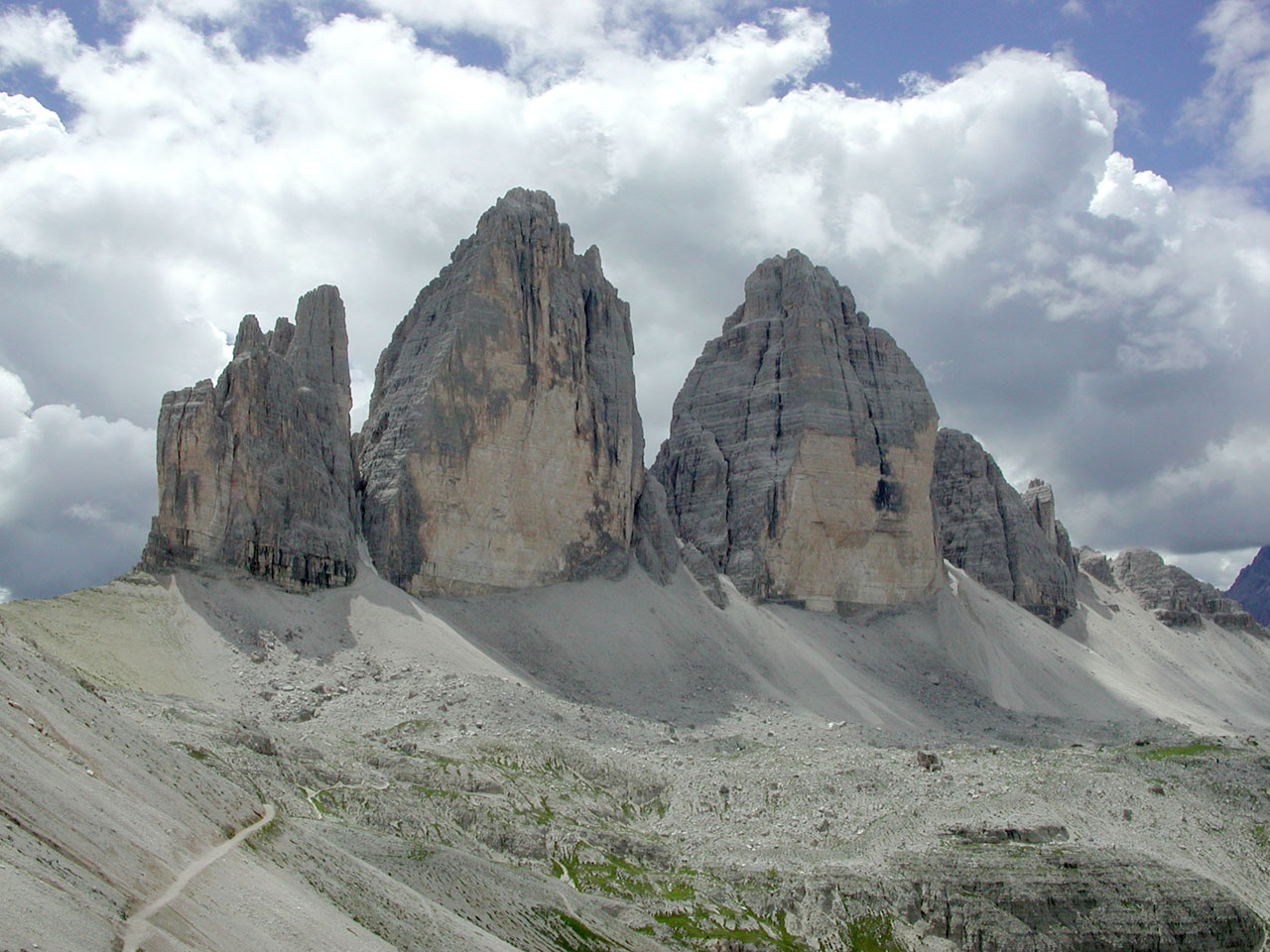
The Tre Cime di Lavaredo hosted the finish to the Giro's queen stage.

There were three stages that began or ended outside Italy. Stage 12, the first high mountain stage, ended at the French city Briançon, a frequent destination for the Tour de France. The 16th stage ended at Lienz in Austria, and the 17th began there.

Five stages ended with climbs. Stage 4, the first intermediate stage, ended at Montevergine di Mercogliano at 1,260 m (4,130 ft). The tenth stage, also classified intermediate, had a less imposing final climb of 760 m (2,490 ft), but it was nonetheless expected to change the race's overall standings as it was very long it had numerous small climbs. Stage 13 was a climbing time trial, to Santuario di Oropa at 1,142 m (3,747 ft), with gradients on the climb reaching as high as 13%. Two stages later was perhaps the race's most difficult stage, featuring four major climbs and ending at 2,304 m (7,559 ft) at Tre Cime di Lavaredo. The last mountaintop arrival was in the seventeenth stage, and featured one of the hardest climbs in the world, Monte Zoncolan. Though the summit of this climb was lesser than some other peaks visited in the race, at 1,730 m (5,680 ft), its gradients were crushing, with the steepest stretches reaching over 20% incline. Though the number of mountain stages was small, it was nonetheless expected that it would take a strong climber to win the race.

Stage characteristics and winners
Stage	Date	Course	Distance	Type	Winner
1	12 May	Caprera to La Maddalena	25.6 km (15.9 mi)	Team time trial	Liquigas
2	13 May	Tempio Pausania to Bosa	205 km (127 mi)	Flat or undulating stage	Robbie McEwen (AUS)
3	14 May	Barumini to Cagliari	181 km (112 mi)	Flat or undulating stage	~~Alessandro Petacchi (ITA)~~
	15 May	Rest day			
4	16 May	Salerno to Montevergine di Mercogliano	153 km (95 mi)	Intermediate stage	Danilo Di Luca (ITA)
5	17 May	Teano to Frascati	173 km (107 mi)	Flat or undulating stage	Robert Förster (GER)
6	18 May	Tivoli to Spoleto	177 km (110 mi)	Intermediate stage	Luis Felipe Laverde (COL)
7	19 May	Spoleto to Scarperia	254 km (158 mi)	Flat or undulating stage	~~Alessandro Petacchi (ITA)~~
8	20 May	Barberino di Mugello to Fiorano Modenese	200 km (120 mi)	Flat or undulating stage	Kurt Asle Arvesen (NOR)
9	21 May	Reggio Emilia to Lido di Camaiore	177 km (110 mi)	Flat or undulating stage	Danilo Napolitano (ITA)
10	22 May	Camiaore to Santuario Nostra Signora della Guardia	250 km (160 mi)	Intermediate stage	Leonardo Piepoli (ITA)
11	23 May	Serravalle Scrivia to Pinerolo	198 km (123 mi)	Flat or undulating stage	~~Alessandro Petacchi (ITA)~~
12	24 May	Scalenghe to Briançon (France)	163 km (101 mi)	Mountain stage	Danilo Di Luca (ITA)
13	25 May	Biella to Santuario di Oropa	12.6 km (7.8 mi)	Individual time trial	Marzio Bruseghin (ITA)
14	26 May	Cantù to Bergamo	192 km (119 mi)	Intermediate stage	Stefano Garzelli (ITA)
15	27 May	Trento to Tre Cime di Lavaredo	184 km (114 mi)	Mountain stage	Riccardo Riccò (ITA)
	28 May	Rest day			
16	29 May	Agordo to Lienz (Austria)	189 km (117 mi)	Flat or undulating stage	Stefano Garzelli (ITA)
17	30 May	Lienz (Austria) to Monte Zoncolan	142 km (88 mi)	Mountain stage	Gilberto Simoni (ITA)
18	31 May	Udine to Riese Pio X	203 km (126 mi)	Flat or undulating stage	~~Alessandro Petacchi (ITA)~~
19	1 June	Treviso to Terme di Comano	179 km (111 mi)	Flat or undulating stage	Iban Mayo (ESP)
20	2 June	Bardolino to Verona	43 km (27 mi)	Individual time trial	Paolo Savoldelli (ITA)
21	3 June	Vestone to Milan	185 km (115 mi)	Flat or undulating stage	~~Alessandro Petacchi (ITA)~~
	Total		3,486 km (2,166 mi)		

== Race overview ==
The Giro began with a team time trial on the island of Sardinia. The winning team was Liquigas, but due to unusual stage-ending tactics, it was Enrico Gasparotto and not team leader Danilo Di Luca who took the first pink jersey. Gasparotto faced intense questioning from his teammates and the media after not yielding first position to his team's captain, as is usual practice in a team time trial. Gasparotto yielded the jersey to Di Luca after stage 2, when Di Luca finished higher-placed in the mass finish, but took it back again after stage 3 when he contested the sprint and finished eighth. Finally, after stage 4, the six-way tie involving the Liquigas riders who finished together in the team time trial was broken, as Di Luca won the stage into Montevergine and took the pink jersey again.

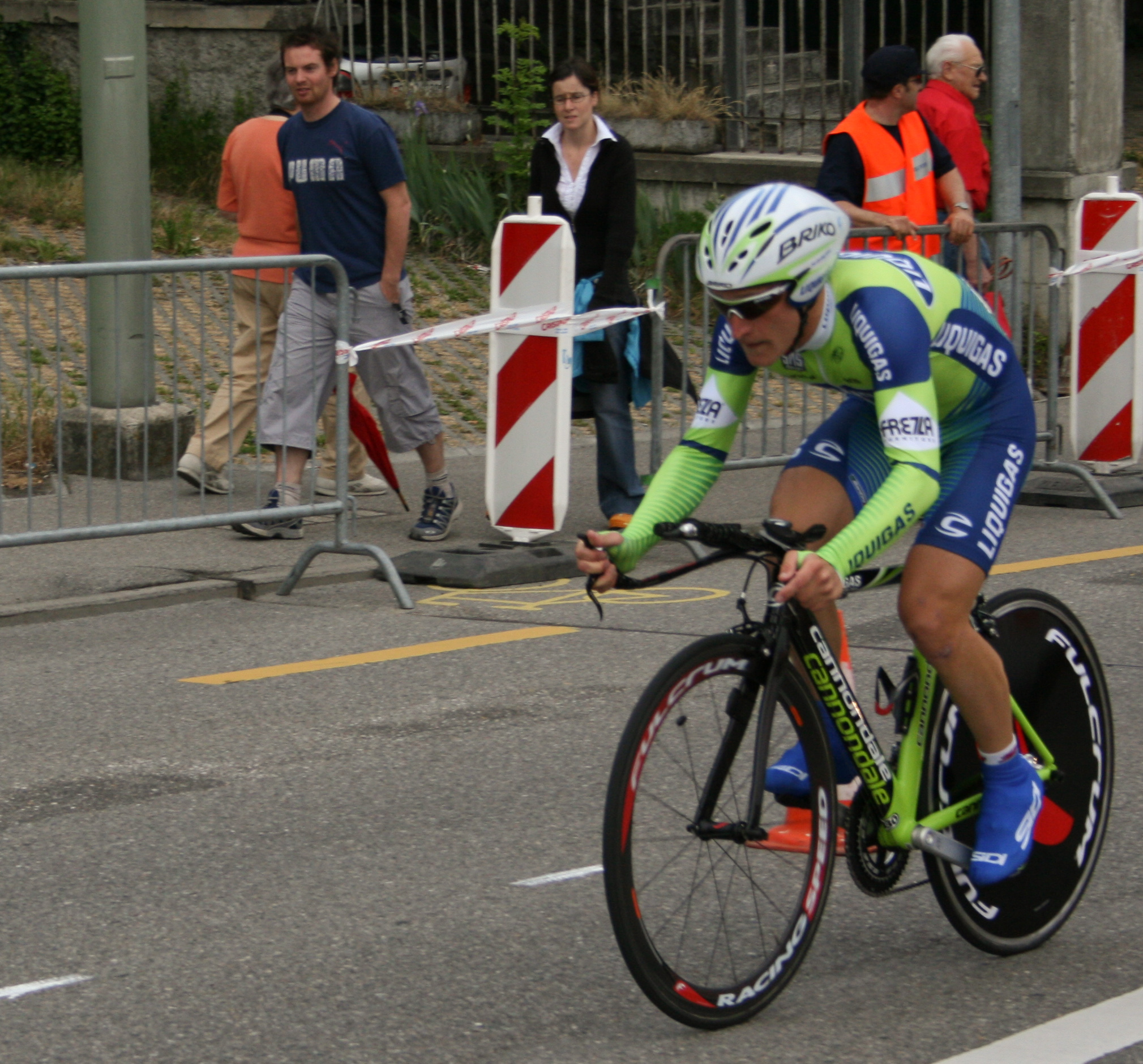
Enrico Gasparotto was unexpectedly the first race leader, having crossed the line first in the stage 1 team time trial ahead of his team's captain.

Di Luca held the race lead until the conclusion of stage 6, which was decided by a breakaway. Luis Felipe Laverde and Marco Pinotti were the last members of a five-man morning breakaway still together at the finish. Since Pinotti started the day better-placed in the overall classification and became the new race leader because of their time gap over the peloton, he allowed Laverde to take the stage win. Laverde took the green jersey as mountains classification leader after the stage. The next three stages were flat and contested among sprinters and breakaways. This meant Pinotti was able to maintain his race lead with little difficulty, until stage 10, the Giro's next intermediate stage. The race's overall contenders showed themselves on this stage, with Leonardo Piepoli putting in a decisive attack 5 km (3.1 mi) from the summit of the Santuario Nostra Signora della Guardia to claim victory by 19 seconds over Di Luca. Pinotti finished more than four minutes back, and surrendered the pink jersey to Di Luca's teammate Andrea Noè, who was tenth on the stage. At age 38, Noè was the oldest rider in the Giro and the oldest ever to lead a Grand Tour. Di Luca took the green jersey after this stage, his second stint in the maglia verde to go along with his two in pink. Team CSC's Andy Schleck took the white jersey after this stage by finishing third, after Di Luca passed him for second in the final kilometer.

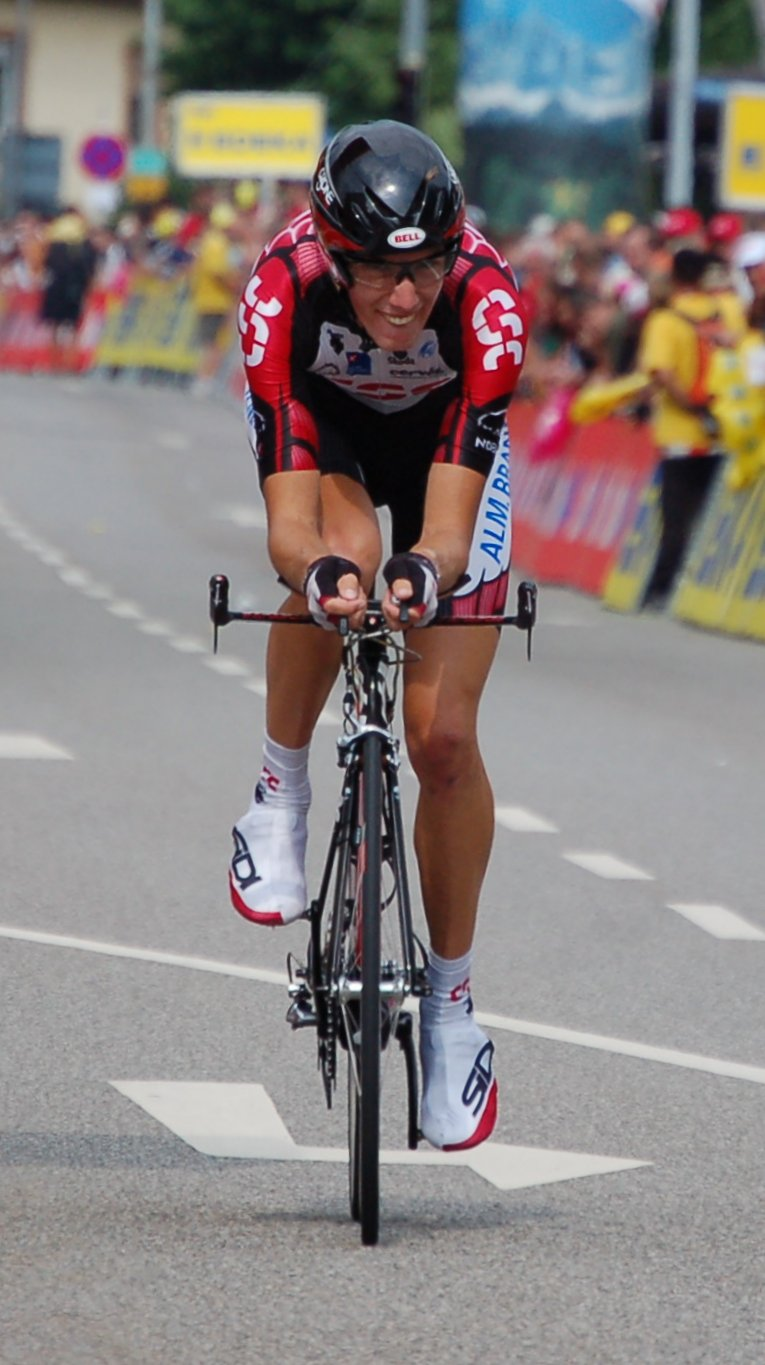
This Giro was the first Grand Tour in the career of Andy Schleck, who finished second overall.

Stage 12 into Briançon in France was the Giro's first high mountain stage, and it shook up the standings for the final time. Di Luca took the stage win, twice attacking from an elite group of five that had made the climb together. As Noè finished nearly ten minutes behind, Di Luca took the pink jersey for a third time, while still holding the green jersey. As Di Luca concentrated on winning the race overall, Piepoli took the green jersey after stage 15, the race's queen stage, topping two of that stage's climbs in first position. His lead in the mountains classification quickly became unassailable, and he won the jersey in Milan. It was also on this stage that Astana's Eddy Mazzoleni distinguished himself as a podium contender, taking a minute and a half out of Di Luca to move into second overall. Schleck lost time to Di Luca and Mazzoleni, but gained time over other riders in the top of the overall standings and stood third overall.

The last minor change to the top of the overall standings took place during stage 17, to Monte Zoncolan. The stage itself was conquered by the Saunier Duval–Prodir duo of Gilberto Simoni and Piepoli. Since the climb had personal significance for Simoni, having won a stage there four years earlier, his teammate allowed him to cross the line first. Schleck, for his part, was third, just seven seconds back, and gained over two minutes against Mazzoleni to move up to the second step of the podium. Mazzoleni fell to fifth on this stage, but returned to the podium after the race's final time trial. Mazzoleni's teammate Paolo Savoldelli won the stage by a comfortable margin, but Mazzoleni took back nearly all the time he had lost on the Zoncolan stage and finished the race third overall. Di Luca was not seriously challenged after taking the race lead in stage 12, and comfortably won the Giro in Milan with a two-minute gap over Schleck in second.

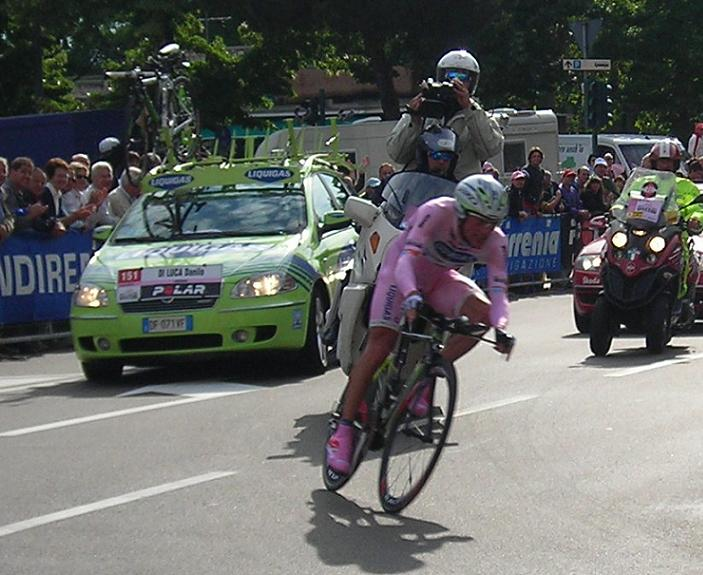
2007 Giro d'Italia champion Danilo Di Luca.

Di Luca's team Liquigas was dominant. They took three stage wins, two with Di Luca himself to go along with the race's opening team time trial, and held the pink jersey for all but four days. With Alessandro Petacchi's disqualification (see below), Saunier Duval-Prodir took the most stage wins. Three of their victories came in the high mountains, with Piepoli, Riccò, and Simoni all winning high-profile stages. Iban Mayo added a breakaway win in Stage 18. Acqua & Sapone–Caffè Mokambo team leader Stefano Garzelli, a former Giro winner, also won two stages. Danilo Napolitano and Marzio Bruseghin both took wins for Lampre–Fondital, and four other teams were single stage winners. The teams classifications and the classifications which awarded jerseys were all won by teams who had won stages, meaning eight of the 22 teams in the race took significant victories.

=== Doping cases ===
The most noteworthy doping case from the 2007 Giro involved sprinter Alessandro Petacchi. Petacchi took five stage wins, but after the third of them, he tested non-negative for salbutamol, an asthma medication which Petacchi has a medical exemption to use. Petacchi was obligated as the stage winner to give a urine sample to the doping authorities, and it had a concentration of 1,352 nanograms per milliliter of salbutamol, above the 1,000 allowed by the medical exemption. Salbutamol has anabolic effects at high concentrations. Team Milram placed Petacchi on immediate provisional suspension following the Giro, which kept him from participating in the Tour de France later that season as he had planned. The Italian National Olympic Committee (CONI) asked the Italian Cycling Federation (FCI) for a one-year ban for Petacchi.

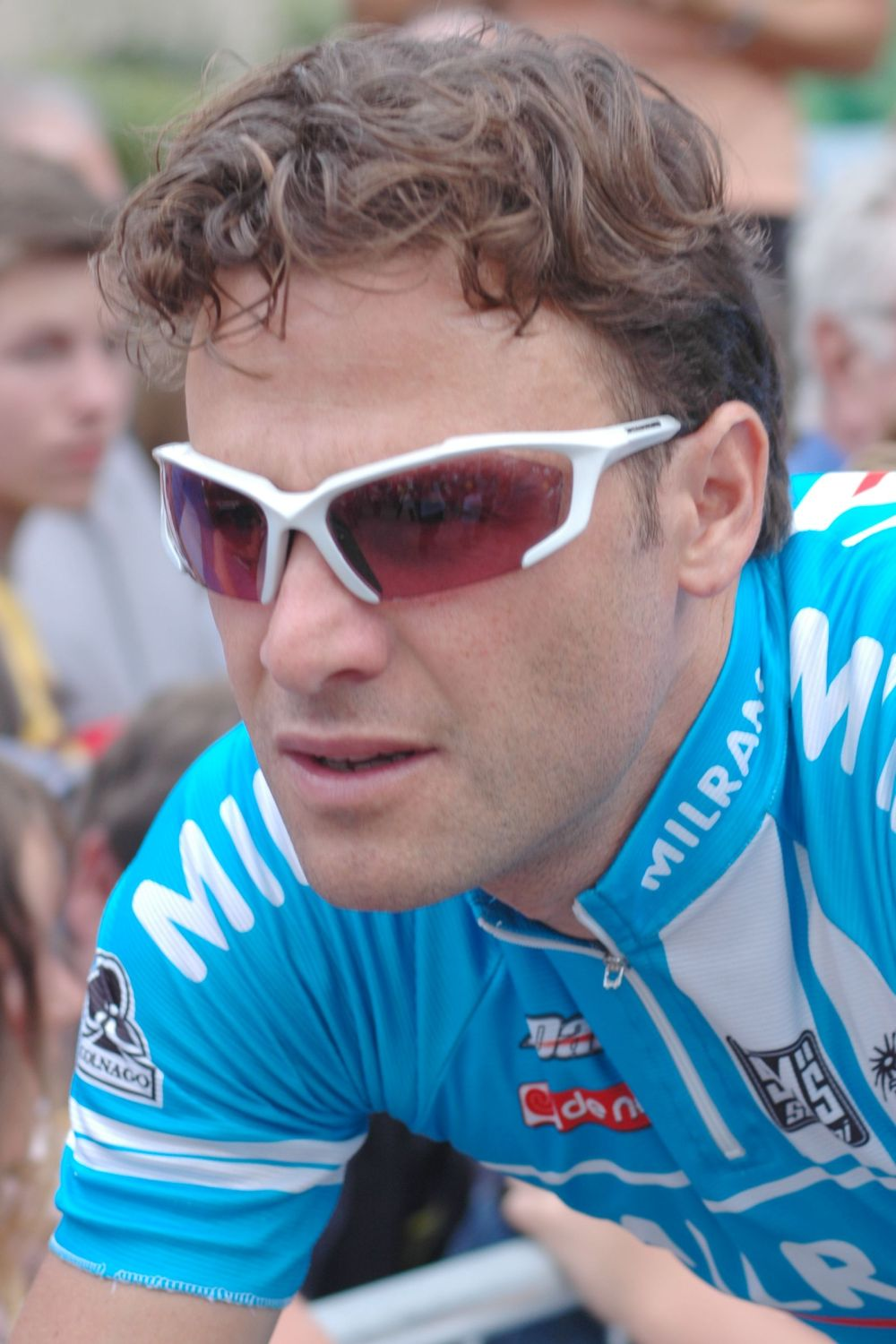
As a result of a control taken after stage 11, Italian sprinter Alessandro Petacchi was embroiled in a doping controversy that was not fully resolved for almost a year.

The FCI refused to suspend Petacchi, and he returned to racing in late July. Their decision, however, was not made to exonerate Petacchi, but rather because they did not believe they should hear the case, instead deferring to the Court of Arbitration for Sport (CAS). The CAS heard the case, and Petacchi testified to the court, stating that the hot and humid day on which the stage was the run had made it so that he took several extra puffs from his inhaler, but that this was accidental and that most had come after he had already crossed the finish line and won the stage.

In its decision, the CAS ruled that Petacchi had likely not intended to cheat, but that he had not exercised the "utmost caution" it deemed necessary to abide by doping rules. Petacchi was suspended for a year, minus the time he had already sat out after Team Milram first provisionally suspended him, and his results from the Giro were all stripped. Team Milram subsequently fired Petacchi, and he was without a team until late in the 2008 season. While the court's decision explicitly stripped Petacchi of his results from this race, it does not seem that it granted those victories retroactively to other riders.

Petacchi was not the only rider identified as giving a non-negative doping test during the Giro. Reports emerged in June that three riders were under suspicion of doping, later identified as Petacchi, Leonardo Piepoli, and Iban Mayo. Petacchi and Piepoli both gave tests showing elevated levels of salbutamol, while Mayo's had abnormally high testosterone levels. Mayo was quickly cleared, as further testing revealed that his testosterone levels were of natural origin and that his team Saunier Duval–Prodir had informed the UCI of this. Though Piepoli's level of salbutamol was, at 1,800 nanograms per milliliter, even higher than Petacchi's, he was cleared by his national federation of any doping charges in August.

Giro champion Danilo Di Luca also gave an irregular doping test, after stage 17 to Monte Zoncolan. The test, given spontaneously hours after the routine test Di Luca gave for being race leader at the time, reportedly showed hormone levels like "those of a child," causing anti-doping authorities to suspect that Di Luca was using some means to cover the presence of banned substances. These unusual levels were not present in the routine test, leading to suspicions that Di Luca had received an autologous blood transfusion between the two tests. A CONI commission later cleared Di Luca on the basis of insufficient evidence to conclude that he had doped.

Mayo and Piepoli would both test positive for erythropoietin later in their careers at the Tour de France, and Di Luca likewise at the 2009 Giro d'Italia, all leading to lengthy suspensions, while Petacchi made a successful return to top-level cycling and to the Giro in 2009.

== Classification leadership ==
In the 2007 Giro d'Italia, four different jerseys were awarded. For the general classification, calculated by adding each cyclist's finishing times on each stage, and allowing time bonuses for the first three finishers on mass start stages, the leader received a pink jersey. This classification is considered the most important of the Giro d'Italia, and the winner is considered the winner of the Giro.

Additionally, there was a points classification, which awarded a mauve jersey. In the points classification, cyclists got points for finishing in the top 15 in a stage. The stage win awarded 25 points, second place awarded 20 points, third 16, fourth 14, fifth 12, sixth 10, and one point less per place down the line, to a single point for 15th. In addition, some points could be won in intermediate sprints.

There was also a mountains classification, which awarded a green jersey. In the mountains classifications, points were won by reaching the top of a mountain before other cyclists. Each climb was categorized, either first, second, or third category, with more points available for the higher-categorized climbs. The highest point in the Giro (called the Cima Coppi), which in 2007 was the Colle dell'Agnello in stage 12, afforded still more points than the other first-category climbs.

The fourth was the young rider classification, which awarded a white jersey. This was decided the same way as the general classification, but only riders born on or after 1 January 1982 were eligible. This classification was featured in the Giro in 2007 for the first time since 1994.

There were also two classifications for teams. The first was the Trofeo Fast Team. In this classification, the times of the best three cyclists per team on each stage are added, and the team with the lowest time is leading team. The Trofeo Super Team was a team points classification, with the top 20 placed riders on each stage earning points (20 for first place, 19 for second place and so on, down to a single point for 20th) for their team.

The rows in the following table correspond to the jerseys awarded after that stage was run. A year after the race, Alessandro Petacchi was stripped of all his results; this table reflects the stages and jersey awards he originally won.

Stage	Winner	General classification	Points classification	Mountains classification	Young rider classification	Trofeo Fast Team	Trofeo Super Team
1	Liquigas	Enrico Gasparotto	not awarded	not awarded	Enrico Gasparotto	not awarded	Liquigas
2	Robbie McEwen	Danilo Di Luca	Robbie McEwen	Pavel Brutt	Enrico Gasparotto	Liquigas	Astana
3	~~Alessandro Petacchi~~	Enrico Gasparotto	~~Alessandro Petacchi~~	Pavel Brutt	Enrico Gasparotto	Liquigas	Caisse d'Epargne
4	Danilo Di Luca	Danilo Di Luca	Robbie McEwen	Danilo Di Luca	Vincenzo Nibali	Liquigas	Liquigas
5	Robert Förster	Danilo Di Luca	~~Alessandro Petacchi~~	Danilo Di Luca	Vincenzo Nibali	Liquigas	Lampre–Fondital
6	Luis Felipe Laverde	Marco Pinotti	~~Alessandro Petacchi~~	Luis Felipe Laverde	Hubert Schwab	Ceramica Panaria–Navigare	Ceramica Panaria–Navigare
7	~~Alessandro Petacchi~~	Marco Pinotti	~~Alessandro Petacchi~~	Luis Felipe Laverde	Hubert Schwab	Ceramica Panaria–Navigare	Ceramica Panaria–Navigare
8	Kurt Asle Arvesen	Marco Pinotti	~~Alessandro Petacchi~~	Luis Felipe Laverde	Alexandr Arekeev	Lampre–Fondital	Ceramica Panaria–Navigare
9	Danilo Napolitano	Marco Pinotti	~~Alessandro Petacchi~~	Luis Felipe Laverde	Alexandr Arekeev	Lampre–Fondital	Ceramica Panaria–Navigare
10	Leonardo Piepoli	Andrea Noè	~~Alessandro Petacchi~~	Danilo Di Luca	Andy Schleck	Lampre–Fondital	Lampre–Fondital
11	~~Alessandro Petacchi~~	Andrea Noè	~~Alessandro Petacchi~~	Danilo Di Luca	Andy Schleck	Lampre–Fondital	Lampre–Fondital
12	Danilo Di Luca	Danilo Di Luca	~~Alessandro Petacchi~~	Danilo Di Luca	Andy Schleck	Lampre–Fondital	Lampre–Fondital
13	Marzio Bruseghin	Danilo Di Luca	~~Alessandro Petacchi~~	Danilo Di Luca	Andy Schleck	Lampre–Fondital	Lampre–Fondital
14	Stefano Garzelli	Danilo Di Luca	~~Alessandro Petacchi~~	Danilo Di Luca	Andy Schleck	Lampre–Fondital	Lampre–Fondital
15	Riccardo Riccò	Danilo Di Luca	~~Alessandro Petacchi~~	Leonardo Piepoli	Andy Schleck	Saunier Duval–Prodir	Lampre–Fondital
16	Stefano Garzelli	Danilo Di Luca	~~Alessandro Petacchi~~	Leonardo Piepoli	Andy Schleck	Ceramica Panaria–Navigare	Lampre–Fondital
17	Gilberto Simoni	Danilo Di Luca	~~Alessandro Petacchi~~	Leonardo Piepoli	Andy Schleck	Saunier Duval–Prodir	Lampre–Fondital
18	~~Alessandro Petacchi~~	Danilo Di Luca	~~Alessandro Petacchi~~	Leonardo Piepoli	Andy Schleck	Saunier Duval–Prodir	Lampre–Fondital
19	Iban Mayo	Danilo Di Luca	~~Alessandro Petacchi~~	Leonardo Piepoli	Andy Schleck	Saunier Duval–Prodir	Lampre–Fondital
20	Paolo Savoldelli	Danilo Di Luca	~~Alessandro Petacchi~~	Leonardo Piepoli	Andy Schleck	Saunier Duval–Prodir	Lampre–Fondital
21	~~Alessandro Petacchi~~	Danilo Di Luca	~~Alessandro Petacchi~~	Leonardo Piepoli	Andy Schleck	Saunier Duval–Prodir	Lampre–Fondital
Final		Danilo Di Luca	~~Alessandro Petacchi~~	Leonardo Piepoli	Andy Schleck	Saunier Duval–Prodir	Lampre–Fondital

== Final standings ==
Legend
A pink jersey	Denotes the winner of the General classification	A green jersey	Denotes the winner of the Mountains classification
A violet jersey	Denotes the winner of the Points classification	A white jersey	Denotes the winner of the Young rider classification

=== General classification ===
	Rider	Team	Time
1	Danilo Di Luca (ITA)	Liquigas	92h 59' 39"
2	Andy Schleck (LUX)	Team CSC	+ 1' 55"
3	Eddy Mazzoleni (ITA)	Astana	+ 2' 25"
4	Gilberto Simoni (ITA)	Saunier Duval–Prodir	+ 3' 15"
5	Damiano Cunego (ITA)	Lampre–Fondital	+ 3' 49"
6	Riccardo Riccò (ITA)	Saunier Duval–Prodir	+ 7' 00"
7	Evgeni Petrov (RUS)	Tinkoff Credit Systems	+ 8' 34"
8	Marzio Bruseghin (ITA)	Lampre–Fondital	+ 10' 14"
9	Franco Pellizotti (ITA)	Liquigas	+ 10' 44"
10	David Arroyo (ESP)	Caisse d'Epargne	+ 11' 58"

=== Mountains classification ===
	Rider	Team	Points
1	Leonardo Piepoli (ITA)	Saunier Duval–Prodir	79
2	Fortunato Baliani (ITA)	Ceramica Panaria–Navigare	46
3	Danilo Di Luca (ITA)	Liquigas	45
4	Gilberto Simoni (ITA)	Saunier Duval–Prodir	41
5	Riccardo Riccò (ITA)	Saunier Duval–Prodir	36
6	Yoann Le Boulanger (FRA)	Bouygues Télécom	24
7	Luis Felipe Laverde (COL)	Ceramica Panaria–Navigare	23
8	Andy Schleck (LUX)	Team CSC	20
9	Damiano Cunego (ITA)	Lampre–Fondital	17
10	Marzio Bruseghin (ITA)	Lampre–Fondital	15

=== Points classification ===
	Rider	Team	Points
~~1~~	~~Alessandro Petacchi (ITA)~~	~~Team Milram~~	~~185~~
2	Danilo Di Luca (ITA)	Liquigas	130
3	Paolo Bettini (ITA)	Quick-Step–Innergetic	120
4	Maximiliano Richeze (ARG)	Ceramica Panaria–Navigare	107
5	Leonardo Piepoli (ITA)	Saunier Duval–Prodir	93
6	Gilberto Simoni (ITA)	Saunier Duval–Prodir	92
7	Stefano Garzelli (ITA)	Acqua & Sapone–Caffè Mokambo	91
8	Andy Schleck (LUX)	Team CSC	85
9	Riccardo Riccò (ITA)	Saunier Duval–Prodir	76
10	Damiano Cunego (ITA)	Lampre–Fondital	76

=== Young rider classification ===
	Rider	Team	Time
1	Andy Schleck (LUX)	Team CSC	93h 01' 34"
2	Riccardo Riccò (ITA)	Saunier Duval–Prodir	+ 5' 05"
3	Domenico Pozzovivo (ITA)	Ceramica Panaria–Navigare	+ 22' 00"
4	Vincenzo Nibali (ITA)	Liquigas	+ 29' 47"
5	Branislau Samoilau (BLR)	Acqua & Sapone–Caffè Mokambo	+ 32' 24"
6	Mauro Facci (ITA)	Quick-Step–Innergetic	+ 1h 07' 00"
7	Olivier Bonnaire (FRA)	Bouygues Télécom	+ 1h 24' 46"
8	Amael Moinard (FRA)	Cofidis	+ 1h 24' 52"
9	Carl Naibo (FRA)	AG2R Prévoyance	+ 1h 33' 11"
10	Matthias Russ (GER)	Gerolsteiner	+ 1h 34' 56"

=== Trofeo Fast Team classification ===
	Team	Time
1	Saunier Duval–Prodir	278h 11' 31"
2	Liquigas	+ 3' 53"
3	Lampre–Fondital	+ 6' 06"
4	Astana	+ 6' 56"
5	Ceramica Panaria–Navigare	+ 10' 15"
6	Acqua & Sapone–Caffè Mokambo	+ 1h 02' 26"
7	Caisse d'Epargne	+ 1h 51' 04"
8	Cofidis	+ 1h 52' 21"
9	Predictor–Lotto	+ 1h 53' 14"
10	Quick-Step–Innergetic	+ 2h 21' 31"

=== Trofeo Super Team classification ===
	Team	Points
1	Lampre–Fondital	408
2	Liquigas	364
3	Ceramica Panaria–Navigare	359
4	Saunier Duval–Prodir	336
5	Astana	287
6	Team CSC	261
7	Acqua & Sapone–Caffè Mokambo	237
8	Quick-Step–Innergetic	219
9	Tinkoff Credit Systems	212
10	Caisse d'Epargne	205

=== Minor classifications ===
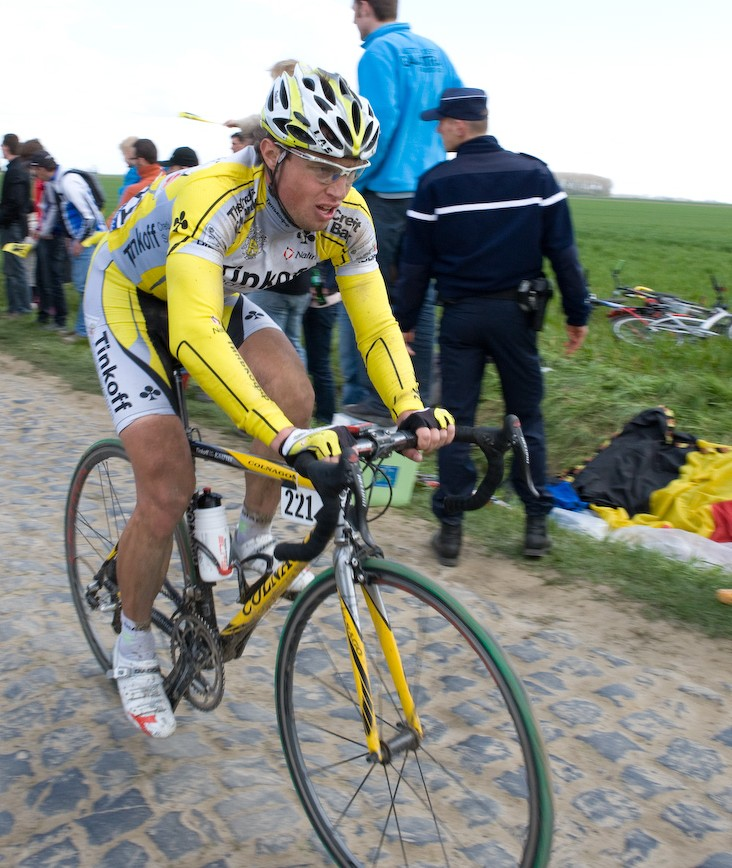
Mikhail Ignatiev won the Traguardo Volante Garibaldi and Trofeo Fuga Gilera classifications.

Other less well-known classifications were awarded during the Giro, whose leaders did not receive a special jersey. These awards were based on points earned throughout the three weeks of the tour. Each mass start stage had one intermediate sprint, awarding points to the Traguardo Volante Garibaldi classification. These sprints gave bonus seconds towards the general classification, points towards the regular points classification, and also points towards the Traguardo Volante Garibaldi. This award was known in previous years as the Intergiro, and was previously time-based, awarding a blue jersey. Tinkoff Credit Systems rider Mikhail Ignatiev won this classification.

Additional minor classifications included the combativity classification, which was a compilation of points gained for position on crossing intermediate sprints, mountain passes and stage finishes. Alessandro Petacchi was the original winner, but with all his 2007 Giro results forfeited, it appears there is no official winner of this award. The Azzurri d'Italia classification was based on finishing order, but points were awarded only to the top three finishers in each stage. Petacchi originally won this as well.

Also, the Trofeo Fuga Gilera rewarded riders who took part in a breakaway at the head of the field, each rider in an escape of ten or fewer riders getting one point for each kilometre that the group stays clear. Along with the Traguardo Volante Garibadli, Mikhail Ignatiev also finished first in this classification. Teams were given penalty points for minor technical infringements. Française des Jeux was not assessed any penalties, and so was the winner of the Fair Play classification.
