= Hubert Schwab =

Swiss cyclist

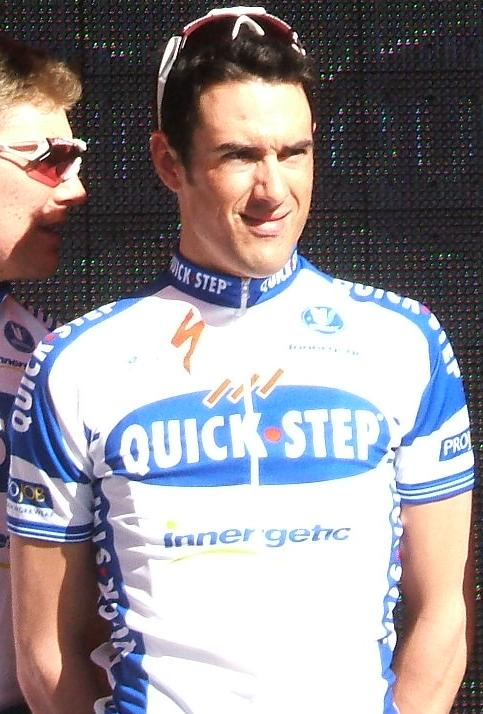

Personal information
- Full name: Hubert Schwab
- Born: 5 April 1982 (age 44) Bottmingen, Switzerland

Cycling career
- Sport: Cycling
- Current team: Retired
- Discipline: Road
- Role: Rider

Amateur teams
- 2002: Schaller–Mega Shop–Look
- 2003: Rufalex–Nordwest
- 2004: Megabike–BH Bike

Professional teams
- 2005: Saeco–Romer's–Wetzikon
- 2006–2009: Quick-Step–Innergetic
- 2010: Vorarlberg–Corratec
- 2010–2011: Price–Custom Bikes

Hubert Schwab (born 5 April 1982 in Bottmingen) is a Swiss former professional road bicycle racer. In his final year as a professional he rode for UCI Continental team Price–Custom Bikes. He retired from cycling after 2011 in order to return to his studies.

In Stage 6 of the 2007 Giro d'Italia Schwab was in a breakaway finishing 4th on the stage moving him into the lead of the youth classification. This allowed him to wear the White Jersey for two days.

== Major results ==
2004
1st Road race, National Under-23 Road Championships
6th Berner Rundfahrt
7th Annemasse–Bellegarde et retou
9th Tour du Lac Leman
10th Road race, European Under-23 Road Championships
10th Tour du Jura
2005
1st Stage 1 Vuelta Ciclista a Navarra
6th Giro del Lago Maggiore
8th Tour du lac Léman
10th Overall Flèche du Sud
10th Clásica Memorial Txuma
2007
8th Overall Tour de l'Ain
2010
National Road Championships

4th Road race
8th Time trial

2nd Overall Tour Alsace
5th GP Kranj
6th Overall Szlakiem Grodów Piastowskich
9th GP du Canton d'Argovie

=== Grand Tour general classification results timeline ===
| Grand Tour | 2007 | 2008 |
|---|---|---|
| Giro d'Italia | 56 | 100 |
| Tour de France | — | — |
| Vuelta a España | — | — |

Legend
| — | Did not compete |
| DNF | Did not finish |
