= Marzio Bruseghin =

Italian cyclist (born 1974)

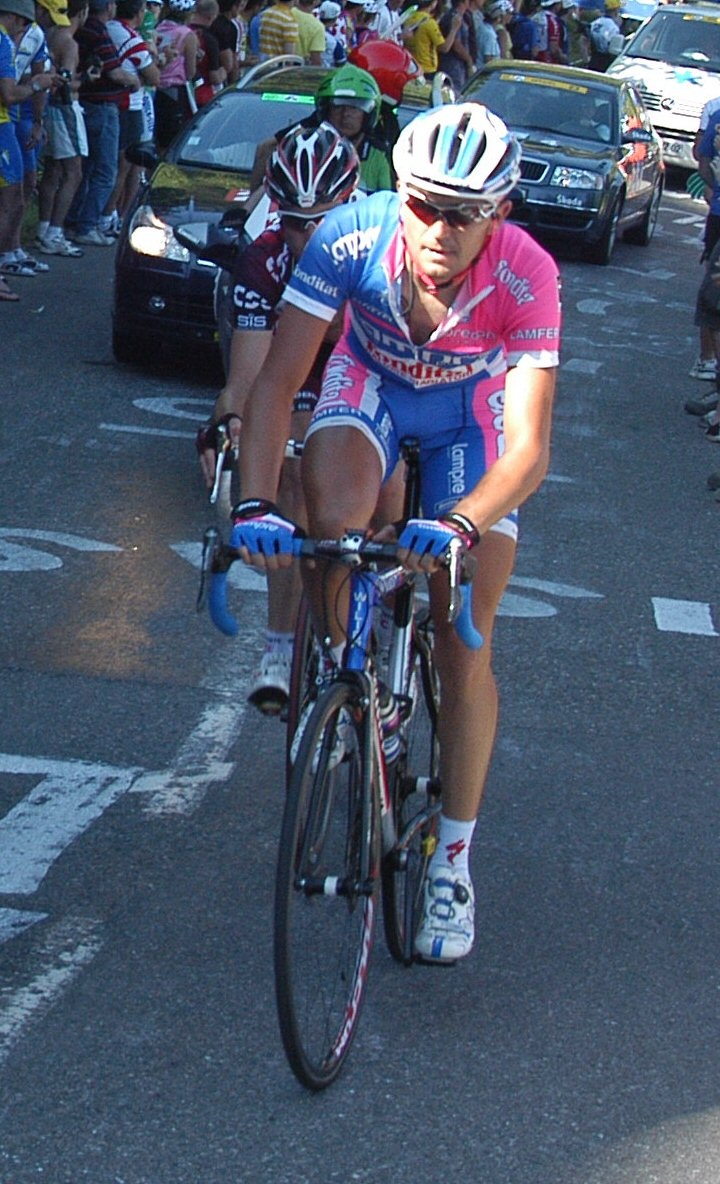
- Bruseghin at the 2007 Tour de France.

Personal information
- Full name: Marzio Bruseghin
- Born: 15 June 1974 (age 52) Conegliano, Italy
- Height: 1.82 m (6 ft 0 in)
- Weight: 70 kg (154 lb)

Cycling career
- Sport: Cycling
- Discipline: Road
- Role: Rider
- Rider type: Time trial specialist

Professional teams
- 1997–1998: Brescialat–Oyster
- 1999–2002: Banesto
- 2003–2005: Fassa Bortolo
- 2006–2009: Lampre–Fondital
- 2010–2012: Caisse d'Epargne

Major wins
- Grand Tours Giro d'Italia 2 individual stages (2007, 2008) One-day races and Classics National Time Trial Championships (2006)

Marzio Bruseghin (born 15 June 1974 in Conegliano, Treviso) is an Italian retired professional road bicycle racer, who competed as a professional between 1997 and 2012. His best achievement was winning the 2006 Italian time-trial championship, as well as winning two time trial stages in the Giro d'Italia. In 2008 he completed all three Grand Tours, including a podium finish (Giro) and a top 10 finish (Vuelta).

== Major results ==
2001
1st Stage 4 Volta a Portugal
8th Overall Volta a Catalunya
2002
8th Overall Critérium du Dauphiné Libéré
2004
6th Giro di Lombardia
6th Firenze–Pistoia
7th Giro Colline del Chianti
2005
2nd Time trial, National Road Championships
8th Overall Deutschland Tour
8th Overall Critérium du Dauphiné Libéré
9th Overall Giro d'Italia
2006
1st Time trial, National Road Championships
6th Overall Deutschland Tour
9th Overall Tour de Pologne
2007
1st Stage 1 Tour de Pologne
8th Overall Giro d'Italia

1st Stage 13 (ITT)

2008
3rd Overall Giro d'Italia

1st Stage 10 (ITT)

10th Overall Vuelta a España
2009
9th Overall Giro d'Italia
9th Gran Premio Industria e Commercio di Prato
2012
9th Memorial Marco Pantani

=== Grand Tour general classification results timeline ===
Grand Tour	1998	1999	2000	2001	2002	2003	2004	2005	2006	2007	2008	2009	2010	2011	2012
Giro d'Italia	80	66	69	16	—	22	58	9	25	8	3	7	DNF	—	17
Tour de France	—	—	—	—	47	66	68	—	20	41	27	80	—	—	—
Vuelta a España	—	—	—	—	—	—	—	—	—	—	10	—	20	14	—

Legend
DSQ	Disqualified
DNF	Did not finish
