= 2006–07 FIS Nordic Combined World Cup =

International skiing competition

Nordic Combined World Cup 2006/07
Winners
- Overall: (Finland) Hannu Manninen
- Sprint: (France) Jason Lamy Chappuis
- Grand Prix Germany: (Finland) Hannu Manninen
- Nations Cup: Austria

Competitions
- Venues: 10
- Individual: 14
- Team: 2
- Cancelled: 4

The 2006/07 FIS Nordic Combined World Cup was the 24th World Cup season, a combination of ski jumping and cross-country skiing organized by FIS. The season started on 25 November 2006 and lasted until 18 March 2007.

== Calendar ==
=== Men ===
Num	Season	Date	Place	Hill	Discipline	Winner	Second	Third
279	1	25 November 2006	(Finland) Kuusamo	Rukatunturi	HS142 / 15 km	(France) Jason Lamy Chappuis	(Finland) Hannu Manninen	(Germany) Sebastian Haseney
		26 November 2006	(Finland) Kuusamo	Rukatunturi	HS142 / 7.5 km	bad weather		
280	2	2 December 2006	(Norway) Lillehammer	Lysgårdsbakken	HS138 / 15 km	(Norway) Magnus Moan	(Germany) Sebastian Haseney	(Finland) Hannu Manninen
281	3	3 December 2006	(Norway) Lillehammer	Lysgårdsbakken	HS138 / 7.5 km	(Austria) Christoph Bieler	(Finland) Anssi Koivuranta	(France) Maxime Laheurte
282	4	16 December 2006	(Austria) Ramsau	W90-Mattensprunganlage	10 km / HS100	(Austria) Christoph Bieler	(Finland) Anssi Koivuranta	(France) Maxime Laheurte
283	5	17 December 2006	(Austria) Ramsau	W90-Mattensprunganlage	HS100 / 7.5 km (Hu.S)	(Norway) Magnus Moan	(France) Jason Lamy Chappuis	(Germany) Ronny Ackermann
1st Grand Prix Germany (30 December 2006 - 6 January 2007)
284	6	30 December 2006	(Germany) Ruhpolding	Große Zirmbergschanze	HS128 / 15 km	(Finland) Hannu Manninen	(Germany) Sebastian Haseney	(Germany) Ronny Ackermann
285	7	6 January 2007	(Germany) Oberstdorf	Schattenbergschanze	HS96 / 15 km	(Austria) Felix Gottwald	(Finland) Hannu Manninen	(Germany) Sebastian Haseney
286	8	13 January 2007	(Italy) Val di Fiemme	Trampolino dal Ben	10 km / HS134	(Austria) Christoph Bieler	(Austria) Felix Gottwald	(France) Jason Lamy Chappuis
287	9	20 January 2007	(Austria) Seefeld	Toni-Seelos-Olympiaschanze	HS100 / 7.5 km	(Austria) Felix Gottwald	(France) Jason Lamy Chappuis	(Norway) Magnus Moan
		21 January 2007	(Austria) Seefeld	Toni-Seelos-Olympiaschanze	HS100 / 15 km	bad weather		
		27 January 2007	(Czech Republic) Harrachov	Čerťák	HS100 / 7.5 km	warm temperatures and lack of snow		
		28 January 2007	(Czech Republic) Harrachov	Čerťák	HS100 / 15 km	warm temperatures and lack of snow		
288	10	3 February 2007	(Poland) Zakopane	Wielka Krokiew	10 km / HS134	(Finland) Hannu Manninen	(Finland) Jaakko Tallus	(Germany) Björn Kircheisen
289	11	4 February 2007	(Poland) Zakopane	Wielka Krokiew	HS134 / 7.5 km	(Germany) Björn Kircheisen	(Finland) Hannu Manninen	(Norway) Magnus Moan
FIS Nordic World Ski Championships 2007
290	12	9 March 2007	(Finland) Lahti	Salpausselkä	HS130 / 15 km	(United States) Bill Demong	(Germany) Sebastian Haseney	(Finland) Hannu Manninen
291	13	10 March 2007	(Finland) Lahti	Salpausselkä	HS130 / 7.5 km (Hu.S)	(Germany) Björn Kircheisen	(Austria) Felix Gottwald	(France) Jason Lamy Chappuis
		17 March 2007	(Norway) Oslo	Holmenkollbakken	HS128 / 15 km	bad weather		
292	14	18 March 2007	(Norway) Oslo	Holmenkollbakken	HS128 / 7.5 km	(France) Jason Lamy Chappuis	(Austria) Felix Gottwald	(United States) Bill Demong

=== Team ===
Num	Season	Date	Place	Hill	Discipline	Winner	Second	Third
6	1	3 January 2007	(Germany) Ruhpolding	Große Zirmbergschanze	HS128 / 2 x 7.5 km Sprint	Finland I Anssi Koivuranta; Hannu Manninen	Germany I Ronny Ackermann; Sebastian Haseney	Austria I Mario Stecher; Christoph Bieler
7	2	14 January 2007	(Italy) Val di Fiemme	Trampolino dal Ben	HS134 / 4 x 5 km	Finland Ville Kähkönen; Jaakko Tallus; Anssi Koivuranta; Hannu Manninen	Austria Christoph Bieler; Bernhard Gruber; Felix Gottwald; Mario Stecher	Norway Håvard Klemetsen; Espen Rian; Petter Tande; Magnus Moan

== Standings ==
=== Overall ===
Rank		Points
1	(Finland) Hannu Manninen	765
2	(France) Jason Lamy Chappuis	696
3	(Norway) Magnus Moan	684
4	(Austria) Christoph Bieler	679
5	(Austria) Felix Gottwald	652
6	(Germany) Björn Kircheisen	494
7	(Finland) Anssi Koivuranta	484
8	(Germany) Sebastian Haseney	474
9	(Germany) Ronny Ackermann	423
10	(Norway) Petter Tande	406

- Standings after 14 events.

=== Sprint ===
Rank		Points
1	(France) Jason Lamy Chappuis	410
2	(Norway) Magnus Moan	316
3	(Austria) Felix Gottwald	304
4	(Austria) Christoph Bieler	287
5	(Germany) Björn Kircheisen	266
6	(Finland) Anssi Koivuranta	244
7	(Finland) Hannu Manninen	205
8	(Austria) Mario Stecher	199
9	(Norway) Petter Tande	170
10	(United States) Bill Demong	157

- Standings after 8 events.

=== Nations Cup ===
Rank		Points
1	Austria	2497
2	Finland	2165
3	Germany	1950
4	Norway	1891
5	France	1293
6	United States	503
7	Switzerland	352
8	Japan	176
9	Czech Republic	93
10	Russia	32

- Standings after 16 events.
