= Pieve di Santo Stefano, Camaiore =

Roman Catholic church in Camaiore, Italy

Coordinates: 43.93076°N 10.32792°E

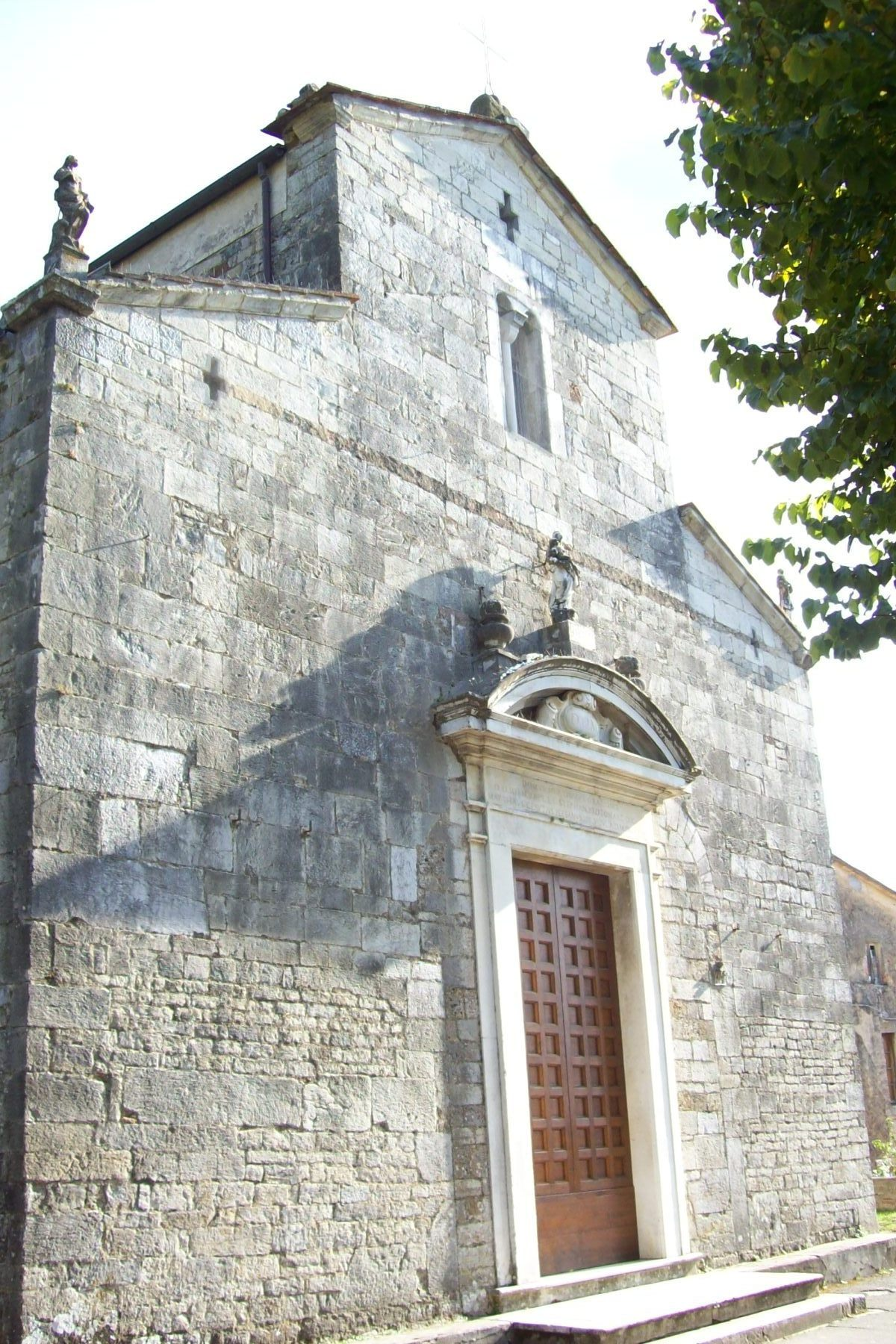
Facade of church

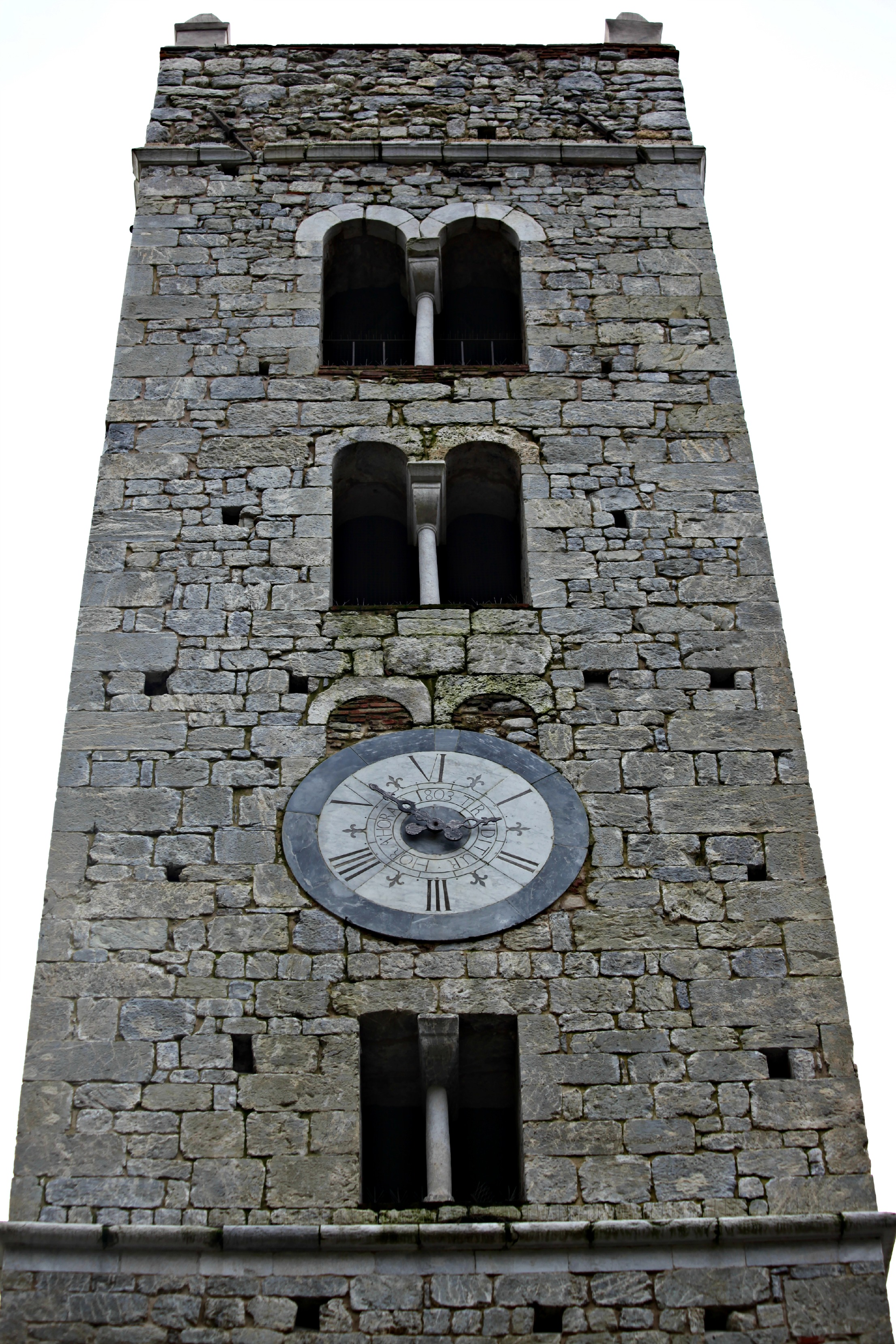
The bell-tower with clock dating from 1803

Santo Stefano or San Giovanni Battista e Santo Stefano is a mixed Romanesque-style, Roman Catholic rural parish church, located in the Piazza Don Renzo Gori in the frazione of Pieve, located south east of Camaiore in the province of Lucca, Tuscany, Italy.

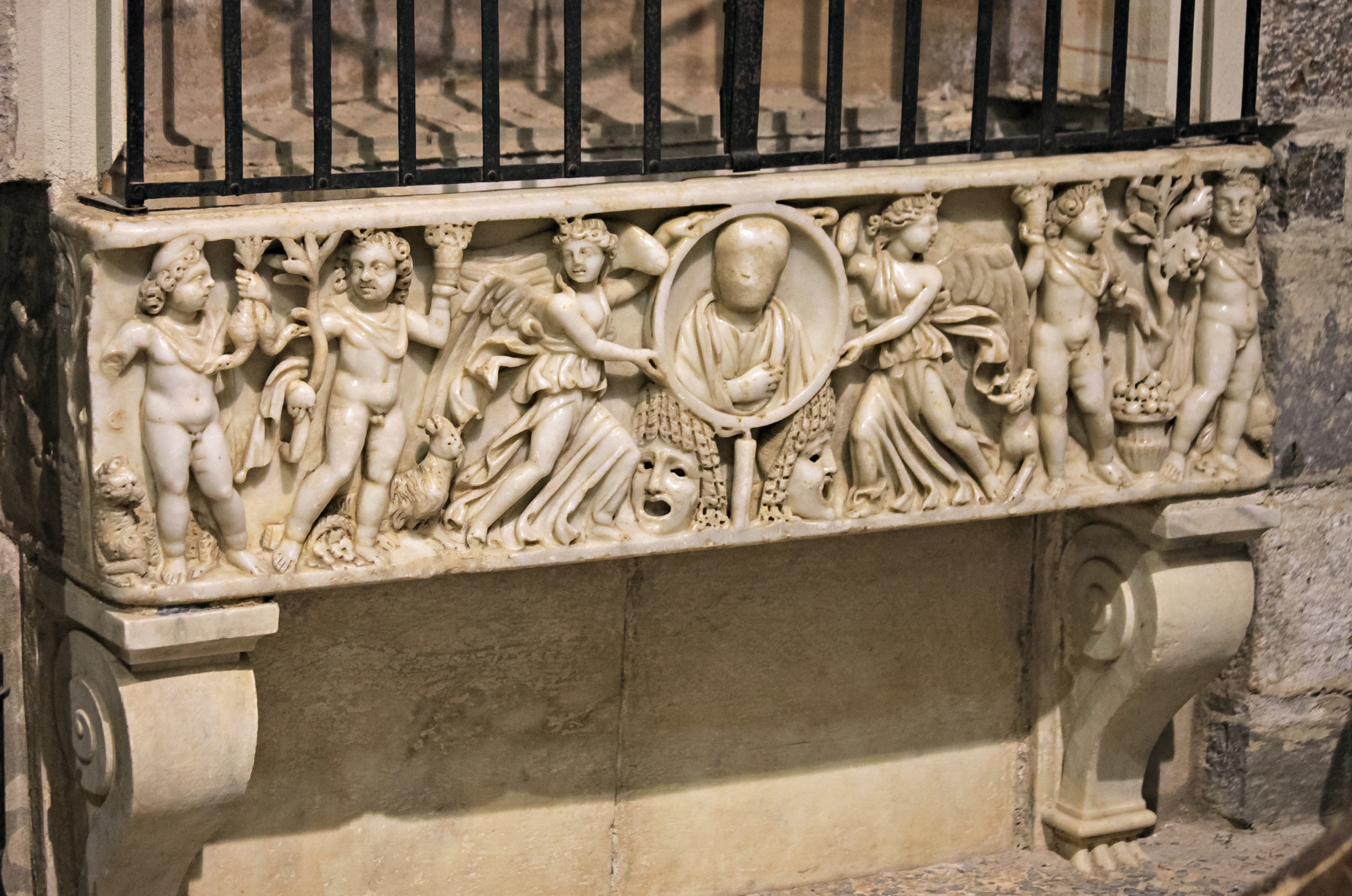
Roman sarcophagus reused for the baptismal font

== History ==
This church is first documented in 817, as the Ecclesie S. Stefani in loco Campo Maiore. Tradition holds that this was one of the pieve erected in the sixth century by San Frediano, bishop of Lucca. It was located near the via Francigena, and served as its main church until in 1255 the church of Santa Maria Assunta was built in the center of town. Originally consecrated just to Saint Stephen, the name of St. John the Baptist was added in the ninth century, since it acquired the privilege of having a baptismal font and a cemetery.

== Description ==
The layout is that of a Latin cross, with a semicircular apse oriented to the east (as usual). The west facade has a single portal redesigned in the 17th century. The rounded arch of the prior portal can still be seen. The portal is crowned by a statuette of Madonna and Child, while in the upper register the mullioned window has been restored. A refurbishment of the church in 1938 restored the features as close as possible to the original Romanesque appearance. The mosaic floor consists of geometric patterns in coloured marble.

The baptismal font is of note since an Ancient Roman sarcophagus of the 2nd or 3rd century was repurposed for it and installed in a niche with a fresco of the Baptism of Christ. Bianco Bianchi (1464–1541), a chronicler from Camaiore, claimed that the sarcophagus had originally contained the ashes of Lucio Imbricio, for whom Lombrici, where it was found, was subsequently named.

The church also houses a fourteenth-century triptych by Battista di Pisa, depicting an Enthroned Madonna and Saints.

=== Bell-tower ===
The stone bell-tower also has similar windows mullioned by a single slender column with corbel-like capital that carries the two round arches. They just slightly increase in size upwards (Other campanile rather increase the number of windows respectively mullions). Covering one of the windows, a clock with marble face plate and six inlaid Roman numerals dates from 1803.
