= Camaiore =

- Comune
- Comune di Camaiore
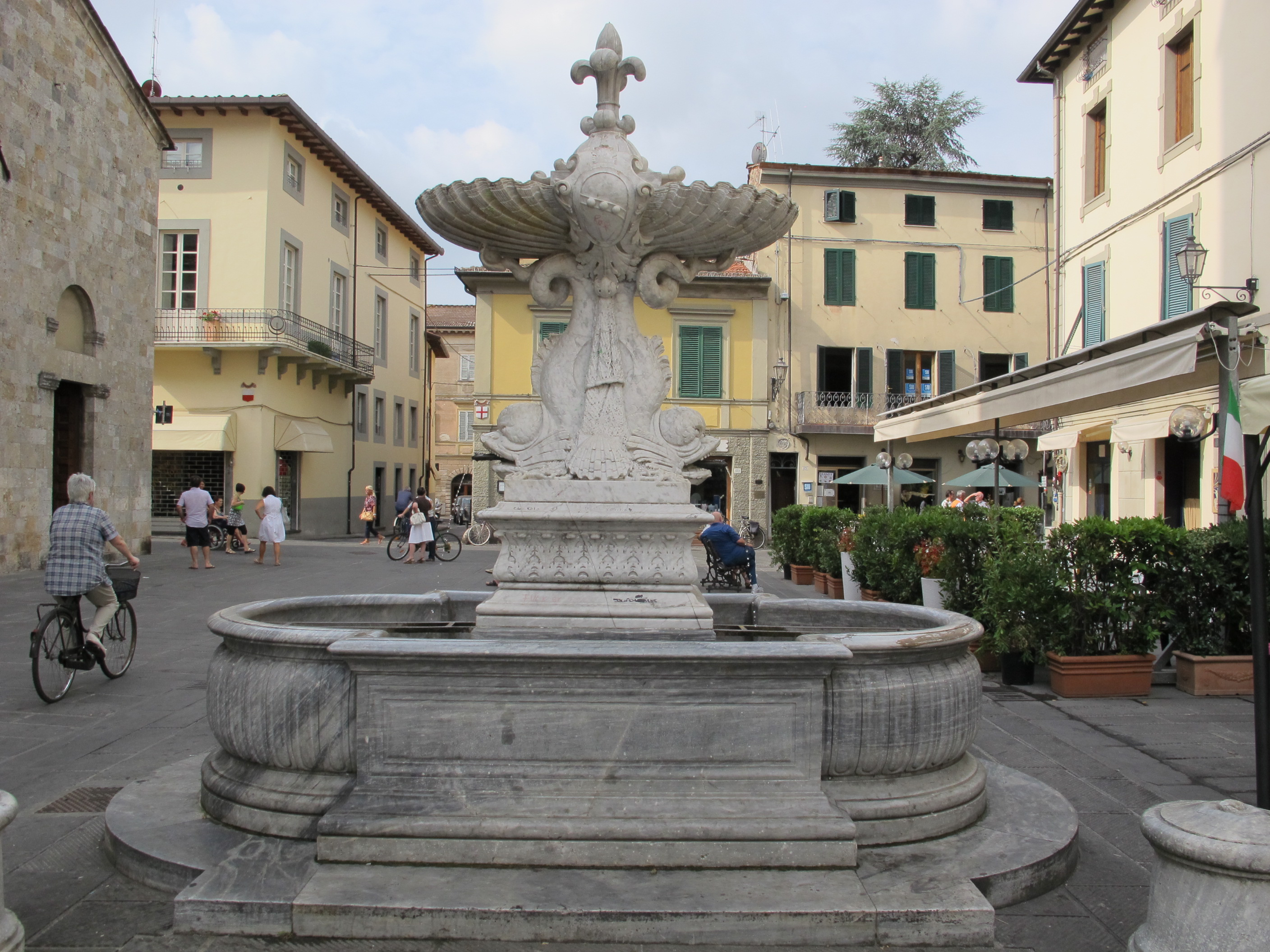
- Fountain on the main square

- Coat of arms

- Location within Italy Location within Tuscany
- Coordinates: 43°56′N 10°18′E
- Country: Italy
- Region: Tuscany
- Province: Lucca (LU)
- Frazioni: Capezzano Pianore, Casoli, Fibbialla, Fibbiano Montanino, Gombitelli, Greppolungo, La Culla, Lido di Camaiore, Lombrici, Marignana, Metato, Migliano, Montebello, Monteggiori, Montemagno, Nocchi, Orbicciano, Pedona, Pieve di Camaiore, Pontemazzori, Santa Lucia, Santa Maria Albiano, Secco, Torcigliano, Vado, Valpromaro

Government
  - Mayor: Marcello Pierucci (PD)

Area
  - Total: 84.59 km^{2} (32.66 sq mi)
- Elevation: 34 m (112 ft)

Population (31 March 2017)
  - Total: 32,322
  - Density: 382.1/km^{2} (989.6/sq mi)
- Demonym: Camaioresi
- Time zone: UTC+1 (CET)
  - Summer (DST): UTC+2 (CEST)
- Postal code: 55041, 55043, 55068, 55040
- Dialing code: 0584
- Patron saint: Santissimo Nome di Gesù (Holy name of Jesus)
- Saint day: June 1
- Website: Official website

Camaiore is a city and comune of 32,513 inhabitants within the province of Lucca, Tuscany, central-western Italy. It stretches from the Apuan Alps to the east, to the plains and the coast of Versilia to the west.

== History ==
Camaiore has Roman origins, as it was the site of one of the largest Roman encampments near the city of Lucca and an important station along the Via Cassia. From this we find the origins of the name "Campus Maior" (Campo Maggiore).

In the Middle Ages, the town grew considerably thanks to the old Via Francigena, which follows northwest from Lucca, towards the Lunigiana and Passo della Cisa, and on to 'Campo Maggiore'. The city represented the twenty-seventh stage during the journey of Sigeric, and was called Campmaior by the Archbishop of Canterbury.

In 1226, the Luccans destroyed the remote hill fortress of Montecastrese, situated above Camaiore on the slopes of Mount Prana, and the survivors of this battle migrated down to the valley in Camaiore as it offered more protection against future city-state attacks.

While Camaiore has Roman origins, and it was heavily contested between the competitive city-states of Lucca and Pisa, it remained largely uninhabited until the 1800s due to its particularly marshy grounds. Eventually, many of the marshes in the area were drained, allowing for growth and development to take place in Camaiore. First, the main streets were constructed, and then several hotels were built for tourists that still come to the area today.

== Geography ==
Camaiore is the largest municipality in Versilia and its territory has many different environments. It extends from the beach in Lido di Camaiore, to the peaks of the Apuan Alps including the peaks of Monte Prana, Mount Matanna and Mount Gabberi and passes through both high and low hills. The plains of Capezzano are also important, as they are known for the cultivation of flowers and the general growth of foliage. In addition to the lido's promenade, there are also rolling hills with small crops of vitis and olives.

Camaiore is rich in water, especially ground water, which is continuously extracted for private use including gardens and greenhouses as well as being used by some adjacent municipalities for the replenishment of local reservoirs. In the summer of 2007 strong earthquakes were felt that, according to some experts, were due to the excessive pumping of groundwater. Earlier, in the mid-nineties, chasms formed which caused extensive damage including the collapse of some houses. Small rivers can be found throughout the area, which are fed by drainage water from the mountains. One of the more important rivers is the Lombricese that runs at the foot of Mount Gabberi, touching the nearby towns of Lombrici and joining another river, the Lucese, which comes down from the pass of the same name, arriving in the valley through Nocchi Marignana (Camaiore) areas and the lower part of Pieve di Camaiore up to Camaiore. From here onwards, it joins with the Lombricese to form the Camaiore river down to its mouth which is called Fosso dell'Abate. Throughout the territory there are ponds and small lakes which are fed from various sources. The coast of Lido di Camaiore is bathed by the Ligurian sea, which extends from Liguria to the promontory of Piombino and not the Tyrrhenian Sea as many mistakenly believe.

== Culture ==
In Camaiore, one of the highlights of the year is the feast of Corpus Domini, locals come out to make and view brightly colored sawdust carpets, and to participate in the religious procession whose route they are built to decorate. The carpets, which use new designs each year, are built on the Saturday night before the feast, often late into the night, and last only until the end of the Corpus Domini procession the following morning. Running the length of the old city, they serve as an adornment for Sunday morning's Eucharistic procession, a manifestation of civic pride, and a catechetical device. The feast of Corpus Domini, the Body of the Lord, also known as Corpus Christi in many parts of the world, is an occasion for devotion to the belief in the real presence of Christ in the consecrated host. The origins of the feast are in Liège, Belgium, in the 13th century. It is held in the last days of May or the first days of June, depending on the date of Easter that year. In Camaiore is present the international school EIS Versilia.

== Main sights ==
- Church of the Badia di San Pietro (church of the Abbey of San Pietro) is the remaining building of a large former Benedictine monastery, documented as early as 761 during Lombard rule of Northern Italy. The Romanesque style church dates from the 12th century. One century later it was conceded to the Florians; the cloistered monastery was surrounded by walls, of which only scant features remain. The church has a simple façade following the elevation of the internal nave and apses, with a double mullioned window above the portal, with a polychrome fresco depicting Enthroned Madonna with Child and Two Saints. Internally, the basilica plan is divided by two rows of round arches supported by square piers.
- Pieve di Santo Stefano, a rural church documented from the 9th century. The current building (12th century) has a 17th-century portal, and houses a baptismal font based on a 2nd-3rd century Roman sarcophagus, and a 15th-century triptych by Battista da Pisa, also known as Battista di Gerio.
- Lido di Camaiore, a beach resort for the town just north of Viareggio on the Mediterranean Coast. The central focus of this touristic area is the Pontile Bellavista Vittoria, which is a pier that offers panoramic views of the sea.
- Santa Maria Assunta: Built in 13th century, in 1515 became Collegiate church
- Church of Immacolata Concezione e San Lazzaro
- Villa Borbone delle Pianore

== Sport ==
Born, raised and still residing in Camaiore, is the Under 23 Road Cycling champion, Francesco Chicchi, who is currently racing for the professional team of Liquigas.

Lido di Camaiore, has been repeatedly a stage finish of the Giro d'Italia

- 1997 (May 28): Stage 11, won by (Italy) Gabriele Missaglia.
- 2002 (May 19): Stage 7, won by (Belgium) Rik Verbrugghe.
- 2007 (May 21): Stage9, won by (Italy) Danilo Napolitano.

== Notable people ==
- Giorgio Gaber, singer, composer, actor and playwright
- Francesco Gasparini, Baroque composer and teacher
- Ermenegildo Pistelli, papyrologist, palaeographer, philologist and presbyter
- Giovanni Marracci, baroque painter
- Prince Xavier of Bourbon-Parma (1889–1977), Carlist leader
- Zita of Bourbon-Parma, last Empress of Austria
- Harry Jackson, Artist, Sculptor
- Andrea Larini, racing driver
- Nicola Larini, racing driver

== Sister cities ==
Camaiore is twinned with the following towns:

- Rovinj, Croatia, since 1990
- Überherrn, Germany, since 2000
- L'Hôpital, France, since 2000
- Castel di Casio, Italy, since 2008
- Carpentras, France, since 2009
- (United States) Cody, Wyoming, USA, since 2017

== See also ==
- Alpi Apuane
- Versilia
- Via Francigena
