= Kähkönen =

Kähkönen is a Finnish surname. Notable people with the surname include:

- Heikki Kähkönen (1891–1962), Finnish wrestler
- Jyrki Kähkönen (born 1967), Finnish hurdler
- Kaapo Kähkönen (born 1996), Finnish ice hockey goaltender
- Sirpa Kähkönen (born 1964), Finnish novelist and translator
- Toni Kähkönen (born 1986), Finnish ice hockey forward
- Ville Kähkönen (born 1984), Finnish Nordic combined skier
