= 2007 in Nordic combined =

== News ==
=== January ===
- 3 - In the first event of 2007 Anssi Koivuranta and Hannu Manninen clinch a victory in the team sprint held in Ruhpolding. They finished in front of the German and Austrian team.

== Nordic combined World Cup ==
Date	Place	Discipline	Winner	Leader
25 November 2006	Kuusamo, Finland	Gundersen	(France) Jason Lamy Chappuis	(France) Jason Lamy Chappuis
2 December 2006	Lillehammer, Norway	Gundersen	(Norway) Magnus Moan	
3 December 2006	Lillehammer, Norway	Sprint	(Austria) Christoph Bieler	
16 December 2006	Ramsau am Dachstein, Austria	Mass	(Austria) Christoph Bieler	
17 December 2006	Ramsau am Dachstein, Austria	Sprint	(Norway) Magnus Moan	
30 December 2006	Ruhpolding, Germany	Gundersen	(Finland) Hannu Manninen	(Austria) Christoph Bieler
3 January 2007	Ruhpolding, Germany	Team Sprint	Finland; Anssi Koivuranta; Hannu Manninen	(Austria) Christoph Bieler

== FIS Nordic World Ski Championships ==
Location: Sapporo, Japan

Date	Disc.	Gold	Silver	Bronze
23 February 2007	Individual Sprint			
25 February 2007	Team Sprint			
3 March 2007	Individual Gundersen			
