= 2002 Giro d'Italia, Prologue to Stage 10 =

Cycling race stages

The 2002 Giro d'Italia was the 85th edition of the Giro d'Italia, one of cycling's Grand Tours. The Giro began in Groningen, the Netherlands, with a Prologue individual time trial on 11 May, and Stage 10 occurred on 22 May with a stage to Benevento. The race finished in Milan on 2 June.

== Prologue ==
11 May 2002 — Groningen, 6.5 km (4.0 mi) (ITT)

Prologue result and general classification after Prologue

Rank	Rider	Team	Time
1	Juan Carlos Domínguez (ESP)	Phonak	8' 12"
2	Rik Verbrugghe (BEL)	Lotto–Adecco	+ 1"
3	Paolo Savoldelli (ITA)	Index–Alexia Alluminio	+ 4"
4	Matthias Buxhofer (AUT)	Phonak	+ 8"
5	Frank Høj (DEN)	Team Coast	+ 9"
6	Davide Rebellin (ITA)	Gerolsteiner	+ 10"
7	Grischa Niermann (GER)	Rabobank	s.t.
8	Michael Boogerd (NED)	Rabobank	+ 13"
9	Carlos Sastre (ESP)	CSC–Tiscali	s.t.
10	Torsten Hiekmann (GER)	Team Telekom	+ 14"

== Stage 1 ==
12 May 2002 — Groningen to Münster, 215 km (134 mi)

Stage 1 Result

Rank	Rider	Team	Time
1	Mario Cipollini (ITA)	Acqua & Sapone–Cantina Tollo	5h 37' 14"
2	Graeme Brown (AUS)	Ceramiche Panaria–Fiordo	s.t.
3	Robbie McEwen (AUS)	Lotto–Adecco	s.t.
4	Danilo Hondo (GER)	Team Telekom	s.t.
5	Sven Teutenberg (GER)	Phonak	s.t.
6	Robert Hunter (RSA)	Mapei–Quick-Step	s.t.
7	Miguel Ángel Meza (MEX)	Team Colpack–Astro	s.t.
8	Mikhaylo Khalilov (UKR)	Colombia–Selle Italia	s.t.
9	Steven de Jongh (NED)	Rabobank	s.t.
10	Matteo Carrara (ITA)	Team Colpack–Astro	s.t.

General classification after Stage 1

Rank	Rider	Team	Time
1	Mario Cipollini (ITA)	Acqua & Sapone–Cantina Tollo	5h 45' 23"
2	Matthias Buxhofer (AUT)	Phonak	+ 11"
3	Frank Høj (DEN)	Team Coast	+ 12"
4	Robbie McEwen (AUS)	Lotto–Adecco	+ 13"
5	Paolo Bettini (ITA)	Mapei–Quick-Step	+ 20"
6	Massimo Strazzer (ITA)	Phonak	s.t.
7	Robert Hunter (RSA)	Mapei–Quick-Step	+ 21"
8	Alessandro Petacchi (ITA)	Fassa Bortolo	s.t.
9	Stefano Garzelli (ITA)	Mapei–Quick-Step	+ 22"
10	Sven Teutenberg (GER)	Phonak	+ 23"

== Stage 2 ==
13 May 2002 — Cologne to Ans, 209 km (130 mi)

Stage 2 Result

Rank	Rider	Team	Time
1	Stefano Garzelli (ITA)	Mapei–Quick-Step	5h 25' 12"
2	Francesco Casagrande (ITA)	Fassa Bortolo	s.t.
3	Jens Heppner (GER)	Team Telekom	s.t.
4	Davide Rebellin (ITA)	Gerolsteiner	s.t.
5	Tyler Hamilton (USA)	CSC–Tiscali	s.t.
6	Michael Boogerd (NED)	Rabobank	s.t.
7	Rik Verbrugghe (BEL)	Lotto–Adecco	s.t.
8	Cadel Evans (AUS)	Mapei–Quick-Step	+ 3"
9	Mikhaylo Khalilov (UKR)	Colombia–Selle Italia	s.t.
10	Juan Carlos Domínguez (ESP)	Phonak	s.t.

General classification after Stage 2

Rank	Rider	Team	Time
1	Stefano Garzelli (ITA)	Mapei–Quick-Step	11h 10' 45"
2	Fabrizio Guidi (ITA)	Team Coast	+ 13"
3	Rik Verbrugghe (BEL)	Lotto–Adecco	+ 19"
4	Juan Carlos Domínguez (ESP)	Phonak	+ 21"
5	Matthias Kessler (GER)	Team Telekom	+ 27"
6	Francesco Casagrande (ITA)	Fassa Bortolo	+ 31"
7	Mikhaylo Khalilov (UKR)	Colombia–Selle Italia	+ 33"
8	Matthias Buxhofer (AUT)	Phonak	+ 34"
9	Cadel Evans (AUS)	Mapei–Quick-Step	+ 37"
10	Dario Frigo (ITA)	Tacconi Sport	+ 41"

== Stage 3 ==
14 May 2002 — Verviers to Esch-sur-Alzette, 206 km (128 mi)

Stage 3 Result

Rank	Rider	Team	Time
1	Mario Cipollini (ITA)	Acqua & Sapone–Cantina Tollo	5h 46' 57"
2	Massimo Strazzer (ITA)	Phonak	s.t.
3	Danilo Hondo (GER)	Team Telekom	s.t.
4	Isaac Gálvez (ESP)	Kelme–Costa Blanca	s.t.
5	Mikhaylo Khalilov (UKR)	Colombia–Selle Italia	s.t.
6	Graeme Brown (AUS)	Ceramiche Panaria–Fiordo	s.t.
7	Alessandro Petacchi (ITA)	Fassa Bortolo	s.t.
8	Steven de Jongh (NED)	Rabobank	s.t.
9	Moreno Di Biase (ITA)	Mobilvetta Design–Formaggi Trentini	s.t.
10	Sven Teutenberg (GER)	Phonak	s.t.

General classification after Stage 3

Rank	Rider	Team	Time
1	Stefano Garzelli (ITA)	Mapei–Quick-Step	16h 57' 42"
2	Fabrizio Guidi (ITA)	Team Coast	+ 13"
3	Rik Verbrugghe (BEL)	Lotto–Adecco	+ 19"
4	Juan Carlos Domínguez (ESP)	Phonak	+ 21"
5	Matthias Kessler (GER)	Team Telekom	+ 27"
6	Francesco Casagrande (ITA)	Fassa Bortolo	+ 31"
7	Mikhaylo Khalilov (UKR)	Colombia–Selle Italia	s.t.
8	Matthias Buxhofer (AUT)	Phonak	+ 34"
9	Cadel Evans (AUS)	Mapei–Quick-Step	+ 37"
10	Dario Frigo (ITA)	Tacconi Sport	+ 41"

== Stage 4 ==
15 May 2002 — Esch-sur-Alzette to Strasbourg, 232 km (144 mi)

Stage 4 Result

Rank	Rider	Team	Time
1	Robbie McEwen (AUS)	Lotto–Adecco	5h 37' 13"
2	Mario Cipollini (ITA)	Acqua & Sapone–Cantina Tollo	s.t.
3	Enrico Degano (ITA)	Ceramiche Panaria–Fiordo	s.t.
4	Graeme Brown (AUS)	Ceramiche Panaria–Fiordo	s.t.
5	Alessandro Petacchi (ITA)	Fassa Bortolo	s.t.
6	Fabrizio Guidi (ITA)	Team Coast	s.t.
7	Aart Vierhouten (NED)	Lotto–Adecco	s.t.
8	Sven Teutenberg (GER)	Phonak	s.t.
9	Massimo Strazzer (ITA)	Phonak	s.t.
10	Moreno Di Biase (ITA)	Mobilvetta Design–Formaggi Trentini	s.t.

General classification after Stage 4

Rank	Rider	Team	Time
1	Stefano Garzelli (ITA)	Mapei–Quick-Step	22h 34' 55"
2	Fabrizio Guidi (ITA)	Team Coast	+ 9"
3	Rik Verbrugghe (BEL)	Lotto–Adecco	+ 19"
4	Juan Carlos Domínguez (ESP)	Phonak	+ 21"
5	Matthias Kessler (GER)	Team Telekom	+ 27"
6	Francesco Casagrande (ITA)	Fassa Bortolo	+ 31"
7	Mikhaylo Khalilov (UKR)	Colombia–Selle Italia	s.t.
8	Matthias Buxhofer (AUT)	Phonak	+ 34"
9	Cadel Evans (AUS)	Mapei–Quick-Step	+ 37"
10	Dario Frigo (ITA)	Tacconi Sport	+ 41"

== Rest day 1 ==
16 May 2002

== Stage 5 ==
17 May 2002 — Fossano to Limone Piemonte, 150 km (93 mi)

Stage 5 Result

Rank	Rider	Team	Time
1	Stefano Garzelli (ITA)	Mapei–Quick-Step	3h 46' 45"
2	Santiago Pérez (ESP)	Kelme–Costa Blanca	s.t.
3	Gilberto Simoni (ITA)	Saeco–Longoni Sport	s.t.
4	Francesco Casagrande (ITA)	Fassa Bortolo	s.t.
5	Wladimir Belli (ITA)	Fassa Bortolo	+ 7"
6	Fernando Escartín (ESP)	Team Coast	s.t.
7	Aitor González (ESP)	Kelme–Costa Blanca	+ 9"
8	Ivan Gotti (ITA)	Alessio	s.t.
9	Tyler Hamilton (USA)	CSC–Tiscali	s.t.
10	Michele Scarponi (ITA)	Acqua & Sapone–Cantina Tollo	+ 14"

General classification after Stage 5

Rank	Rider	Team	Time
1	Stefano Garzelli (ITA)	Mapei–Quick-Step	26h 21' 28"
2	Francesco Casagrande (ITA)	Fassa Bortolo	+ 43"
3	Gilberto Simoni (ITA)	Saeco–Longoni Sport	+ 1' 00"
4	Santiago Pérez (ESP)	Kelme–Costa Blanca	+ 1' 03"
5	Wladimir Belli (ITA)	Fassa Bortolo	+ 1' 06"
6	Juan Carlos Domínguez (ESP)	Phonak	+ 1' 10"
7	Fernando Escartín (ESP)	Team Coast	+ 1' 11"
8	Tyler Hamilton (USA)	CSC–Tiscali	+ 1' 13"
9	Cadel Evans (AUS)	Mapei–Quick-Step	+ 1' 14"
10	Davide Rebellin (ITA)	Gerolsteiner	+ 1' 19"

== Stage 6 ==
18 May 2002 — Cuneo to Varazze, 191 km (119 mi)

Stage 6 Result

Rank	Rider	Team	Time
1	Giovanni Lombardi (ITA)	Acqua & Sapone–Cantina Tollo	4h 56' 45"
2	Ruggero Marzoli (ITA)	Mobilvetta Design–Formaggi Trentini	s.t.
3	Bert Grabsch (GER)	Phonak	s.t.
4	Eddy Mazzoleni (ITA)	Tacconi Sport	s.t.
5	Ángel Vicioso (ESP)	Kelme–Costa Blanca	s.t.
6	Yaroslav Popovych (UKR)	Landbouwkrediet–Colnago	s.t.
7	Jens Heppner (GER)	Team Telekom	s.t.
8	Mariano Piccoli (ITA)	Lampre–Daikin	s.t.
9	Francisco León Mane (ESP)	Kelme–Costa Blanca	+ 18"
10	Thorwald Veneberg (NED)	Rabobank	s.t.

General classification after Stage 6

Rank	Rider	Team	Time
1	Jens Heppner (GER)	Team Telekom	31h 19' 45"
2	Stefano Garzelli (ITA)	Mapei–Quick-Step	+ 3' 33"
3	Yaroslav Popovych (UKR)	Landbouwkrediet–Colnago	+ 3' 43"
4	Pietro Caucchioli (ITA)	Alessio	+ 3' 45"
5	Eddy Mazzoleni (ITA)	Tacconi Sport	+ 3' 57"
6	Francesco Casagrande (ITA)	Fassa Bortolo	+ 4' 16"
7	Paolo Savoldelli (ITA)	Index–Alexia Alluminio	+ 4' 27"
8	Gilberto Simoni (ITA)	Saeco–Longoni Sport	+ 4' 33"
9	Santiago Pérez (ESP)	Kelme–Costa Blanca	+ 4' 36"
10	Wladimir Belli (ITA)	Fassa Bortolo	+ 4' 39"

== Stage 7 ==
19 May 2002 — Viareggio to Lido di Camaiore, 159 km (99 mi)

Stage 7 Result

Rank	Rider	Team	Time
1	Rik Verbrugghe (BEL)	Lotto–Adecco	4h 03' 59"
2	Raphael Schweda (SWE)	Team Coast	+ 59"
3	Cristian Moreni (ITA)	Alessio	s.t.
4	Max Sciandri (ITA)	Lampre–Daikin	+ 1' 02"
5	Gianni Faresin (ITA)	Gerolsteiner	s.t.
6	Óscar Pereiro (ESP)	Phonak	s.t.
7	Denis Lunghi (ITA)	Team Colpack–Astro	s.t.
8	Dario Cioni (ITA)	Mapei–Quick-Step	+ 1' 08"
9	Alessandro Petacchi (ITA)	Fassa Bortolo	+ 1' 46"
10	Fabrizio Guidi (ITA)	Team Coast	s.t.

General classification after Stage 7

Rank	Rider	Team	Time
1	Jens Heppner (GER)	Team Telekom	35h 25' 30"
2	Stefano Garzelli (ITA)	Mapei–Quick-Step	+ 3' 33"
3	Yaroslav Popovych (UKR)	Landbouwkrediet–Colnago	+ 3' 43"
4	Pietro Caucchioli (ITA)	Alessio	+ 3' 45"
5	Eddy Mazzoleni (ITA)	Tacconi Sport	+ 3' 57"
6	Ángel Vicioso (ESP)	Kelme–Costa Blanca	+ 4' 09"
7	Francesco Casagrande (ITA)	Fassa Bortolo	+ 4' 16"
8	Paolo Savoldelli (ITA)	Index–Alexia Alluminio	+ 4' 27"
9	Gilberto Simoni (ITA)	Saeco–Longoni Sport	+ 4' 33"
10	Santiago Pérez (ESP)	Kelme–Costa Blanca	+ 4' 36"

== Stage 8 ==
20 May 2002 — Capannori to Orvieto, 237 km (147 mi)

Stage 8 Result

Rank	Rider	Team	Time
1	Aitor González (ESP)	Kelme–Costa Blanca	5h 47' 54"
2	Francesco Casagrande (ITA)	Fassa Bortolo	+ 4"
3	Gilberto Simoni (ITA)	Saeco–Longoni Sport	s.t.
4	Juan Manuel Gárate (ESP)	Lampre–Daikin	s.t.
5	Cristian Moreni (ITA)	Alessio	s.t.
6	Ruggero Marzoli (ITA)	Mobilvetta Design–Formaggi Trentini	s.t.
7	Eddy Mazzoleni (ITA)	Tacconi Sport	s.t.
8	Davide Rebellin (ITA)	Gerolsteiner	s.t.
9	Michael Boogerd (NED)	Rabobank	s.t.
10	Paolo Savoldelli (ITA)	Index–Alexia Alluminio	s.t.

General classification after Stage 8

Rank	Rider	Team	Time
1	Jens Heppner (GER)	Team Telekom	41h 13' 28"
2	Stefano Garzelli (ITA)	Mapei–Quick-Step	+ 3' 33"
3	Yaroslav Popovych (UKR)	Landbouwkrediet–Colnago	+ 3' 43"
4	Eddy Mazzoleni (ITA)	Tacconi Sport	+ 3' 57"
5	Francesco Casagrande (ITA)	Fassa Bortolo	+ 4' 08"
6	Ángel Vicioso (ESP)	Kelme–Costa Blanca	+ 4' 09"
7	Paolo Savoldelli (ITA)	Index–Alexia Alluminio	+ 4' 27"
8	Gilberto Simoni (ITA)	Saeco–Longoni Sport	+ 4' 33"
9	Wladimir Belli (ITA)	Fassa Bortolo	+ 4' 39"
10	Pietro Caucchioli (ITA)	Alessio	+ 4' 41"

== Stage 9 ==
21 May 2002 — Tivoli to Caserta, 201 km (125 mi)

Stage 9 Result

Rank	Rider	Team	Time
1	Mario Cipollini (ITA)	Acqua & Sapone–Cantina Tollo	4h 38' 56"
2	Robbie McEwen (AUS)	Lotto–Adecco	s.t.
3	Cristian Moreni (ITA)	Alessio	s.t.
4	Fabrizio Guidi (ITA)	Team Coast	s.t.
5	Ivan Quaranta (ITA)	Index–Alexia Alluminio	s.t.
6	Angelo Furlan (ITA)	Alessio	s.t.
7	Moreno Di Biase (ITA)	Mobilvetta Design–Formaggi Trentini	s.t.
8	Mikhaylo Khalilov (UKR)	Colombia–Selle Italia	s.t.
9	Sven Teutenberg (GER)	Phonak	s.t.
10	Miguel Ángel Meza (MEX)	Team Colpack–Astro	s.t.

General classification after Stage 9

Rank	Rider	Team	Time
1	Jens Heppner (GER)	Team Telekom	45h 52' 24"
~~2~~	~~Stefano Garzelli (ITA)~~	~~Mapei–Quick-Step~~	~~+ 3' 33"~~
3	Yaroslav Popovych (UKR)	Landbouwkrediet–Colnago	+ 3' 43"
4	Eddy Mazzoleni (ITA)	Tacconi Sport	+ 3' 57"
5	Francesco Casagrande (ITA)	Fassa Bortolo	+ 4' 08"
6	Ángel Vicioso (ESP)	Kelme–Costa Blanca	+ 4' 09"
7	Paolo Savoldelli (ITA)	Index–Alexia Alluminio	+ 4' 27"
8	Gilberto Simoni (ITA)	Saeco–Longoni Sport	+ 4' 33"
9	Wladimir Belli (ITA)	Fassa Bortolo	+ 4' 39"
10	Pietro Caucchioli (ITA)	Alessio	+ 4' 41"

== Stage 10 ==
22 May 2002 — Maddaloni to Benevento, 118 km (73 mi)

Stage 10 Result

Rank	Rider	Team	Time
1	Robbie McEwen (AUS)	Lotto–Adecco	2h 57' 24"
2	Fabrizio Guidi (ITA)	Team Coast	s.t.
3	Giovanni Lombardi (ITA)	Acqua & Sapone–Cantina Tollo	s.t.
4	Mikhaylo Khalilov (UKR)	Colombia–Selle Italia	s.t.
5	Massimo Strazzer (ITA)	Phonak	s.t.
6	Cristian Moreni (ITA)	Alessio	s.t.
7	Mariano Piccoli (ITA)	Lampre–Daikin	s.t.
8	Uroš Murn (SLO)	Mobilvetta Design–Formaggi Trentini	s.t.
9	Yaroslav Popovych (UKR)	Landbouwkrediet–Colnago	s.t.
10	Davide Rebellin (ITA)	Gerolsteiner	s.t.

General classification after Stage 10

Rank	Rider	Team	Time
1	Jens Heppner (GER)	Team Telekom	48h 49' 48"
2	Yaroslav Popovych (UKR)	Landbouwkrediet–Colnago	+ 3' 50"
3	Eddy Mazzoleni (ITA)	Tacconi Sport	+ 3' 57"
4	Francesco Casagrande (ITA)	Fassa Bortolo	+ 4' 08"
5	Ángel Vicioso (ESP)	Kelme–Costa Blanca	+ 4' 09"
6	Paolo Savoldelli (ITA)	Index–Alexia Alluminio	+ 4' 27"
7	Gilberto Simoni (ITA)	Saeco–Longoni Sport	+ 4' 29"
8	Wladimir Belli (ITA)	Fassa Bortolo	+ 4' 39"
9	Pietro Caucchioli (ITA)	Alessio	+ 4' 41"
10	Juan Carlos Domínguez (ESP)	Phonak	+ 4' 43"
