= 2007 World Speed Skating Championships =

There were three World Speed Skating Championships in the 2007 season:

- 2007 World Allround Speed Skating Championships
- 2007 World Sprint Speed Skating Championships
- 2007 World Single Distance Speed Skating Championships

== See also ==
- 2007 World Championships (disambiguation)
