= Church of the Badia di San Pietro, Camaiore =

Roman Catholic church in Camaiore, Italy

Coordinates: 43.93857°N 10.31033°E

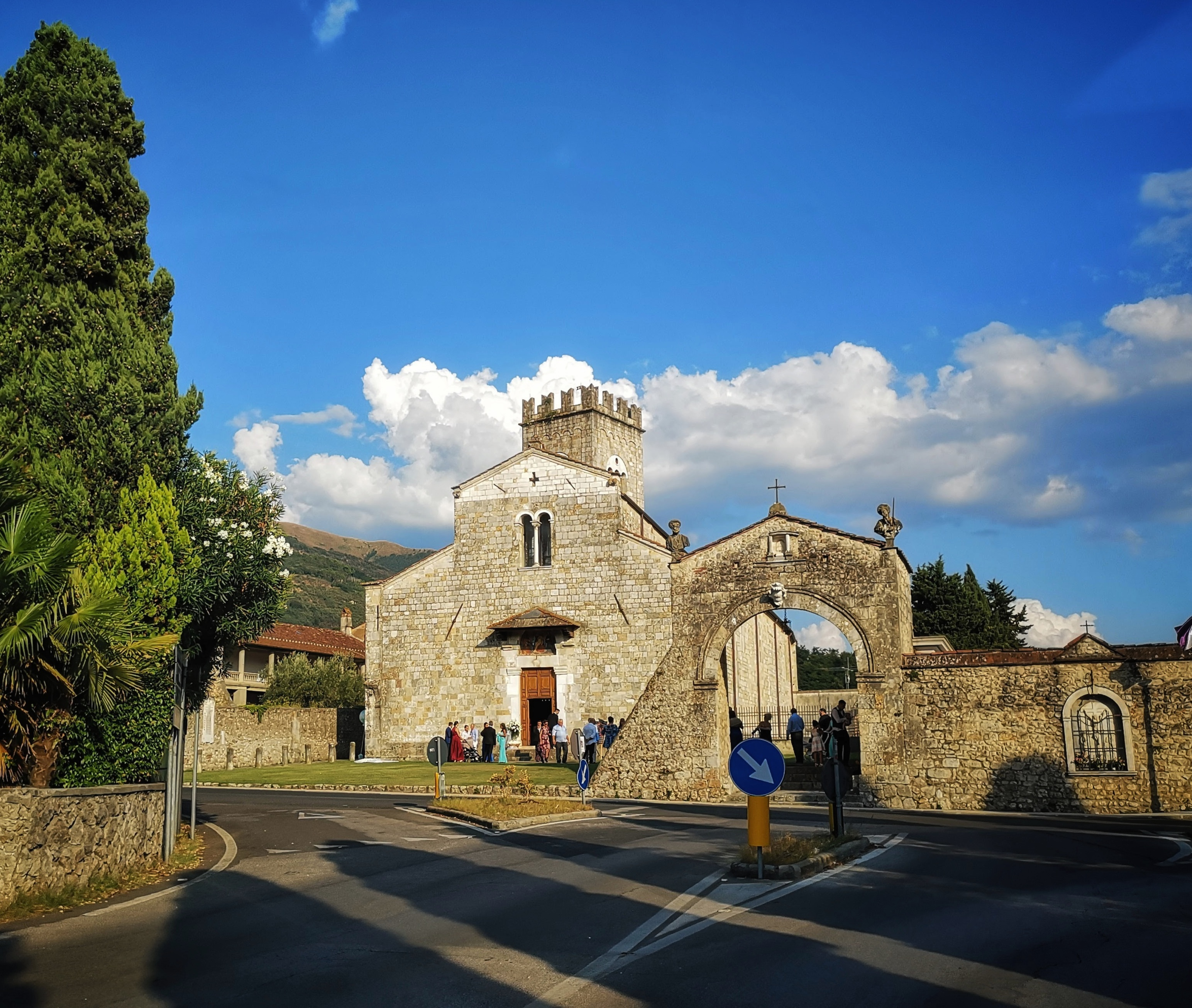
Portal (former entry to Monastery on right), facade of church, and merlionated bell-tower

The Badia San Pietro (Abbey of St Peter) was a former Benedictine monastery just northwest of the center of the town of Camaiore in the province of Lucca, Tuscany, Italy. the main remnant of the former monastery is the Romanesque-style, Roman Catholic parish church located on Via Badia #15.

== History and description ==
A monastery of this name in Camaiore is first documented in 761. The monastery grew in prominence due to its location along the pilgrimage route of the Via Francigena. In a bull from 1180, Pope Alexander III granted the monastery special privileges in the region, including jurisdiction ober the churches of San Michele in Camaiore, San Biagio in Lombrici and San Frediano in Pedona. The abbott was given the privilege to wear both a mitre and crosier, identifying his position as that of a bishop. In 1217 the Cistercian order of the Florians took control of the monastery. Over the next few centuries the fortunes of the monastery would ebb. A fire destroyed most of the frescoes in the church. The monastery fell under control of different orders until in 1527 it was suppressed by Pope Clement VII, and the property granted to the Ospedale di San Luca in Lucca.

Nearly all the monastic quarters were destroyed, part of the refectory remains, the church of San Pietro and a portal, once the entrance to the monastery with a statue of St Peter above. Between 1856 and 1859 the architect Giuseppe Pardini restrored the structures, including the church and bell-tower. The latter was nearly entirely rebuilt. Some of the artworks from the Badia can now be seen at either the Museum of Sacred Art or the Archeological Museum in Camaiore.
