= 2007 World Cup =

2007 World Cup may refer to:

- Alpine skiing: 2007 Alpine Skiing World Cup
- American football: 2007 IFAF World Cup in Japan
- Baseball: 2007 Baseball World Cup in Taiwan
- Biathlon: 2007 Biathlon World Cup
- Bobsleigh: 2007 Bobsleigh World Cup
- Cricket: 2007 Cricket World Cup hosted by the West Indies
- Cricket: ICC World Twenty20 hosted by South Africa
- Cross-country skiing: 2006-2007 Cross-Country Skiing World Cup
- Cycling (track): 2007 UCI Track Cycling World Cup Classics
- Cyclo-cross: 2006/07 UCI Cyclo-cross World Cup
- Football (soccer): 2007 FIFA Club World Cup in Japan
- Football (soccer): 2007 FIFA U-17 World Cup in South Korea
- Football (soccer): 2007 FIFA U-20 World Cup in Canada
- Football (soccer): 2007 FIFA Women's World Cup in China
- Freestyle skiing: 2007 Freestyle Skiing World Cup
- Golf: 2007 Omega Mission Hills World Cup
- Luge: 2007 Luge World Cup
- Nordic combined: 2007 Nordic Combined World Cup
- Rugby Union: 2007 Rugby World Cup in France
- Short track: 2007 Short Track Speed Skating World Cup
- Skeleton: 2007 Skeleton World Cup
- Ski jumping: 2007 Ski Jumping World Cup
- Snowboarding: 2007 Snowboarding World Cup
- Speed skating: 2007 Speed Skating World Cup
- Speedway: 2007 Speedway World Cup
- Volleyball: 2007 FIVB Women's World Cup

== See also ==
- 2007 World Championships (disambiguation)
- 2007 World Junior Championships (disambiguation)
- 2007 Continental Championships (disambiguation)
