= Tour of Germany =

The Tour of Germany is a Nordic combined event first established in Germany for the 2006-07 Nordic Combined World Cup season by the International Ski Federation.

Initially scheduled to include events in Oberhof, Ruhpolding, and Schonach from December 30, 2006, to January 6, 2007, they were changed to warm weather conditions.

| Date | Location | Discipline | Winner | Second | Third |
|---|---|---|---|---|---|
| December 30, 2006 | Ruhpolding, in place of Oberhof | 15 km Individual Gundersen | Hannu Manninen, Finland | Sebastian Haseney, Germany | Ronny Ackermann, Germany |
| January 3, 2007 | Rupholding | Team sprint (2 x 7.5 km) | Anssi Koivuranta; Hannu Manninen; Finland I | Ronny Ackermann; Sebastian Haseney; Germany I | Christoph Bieler; Mario Stecher; Austria I |
| January 6, 2007 | Oberstdorf, in place of Schonach | 15 km Individual Gundersen | Felix Gottwald, Austria | Hannu Manninen, Finland | Sebastian Haseney, Germany |

The top three positions for the tour were Manninen, Haseney, and Gottwald
