= Ville Kähkönen =

Finnish Nordic combined skier (born 1984)

Ville Kähkönen (born 23 June 1984) is a Finnish Nordic combined skier who has been competing since 2002. His lone World Cup victory came in the 4 x 5 km team event in Italy in 2007.

Kähkönen also finished 14th in the 15 km individual Gundersen event at the FIS Nordic World Ski Championships 2007 in Sapporo.
