= Janne Ryynänen =

Finnish Nordic combined skier (born 1988)

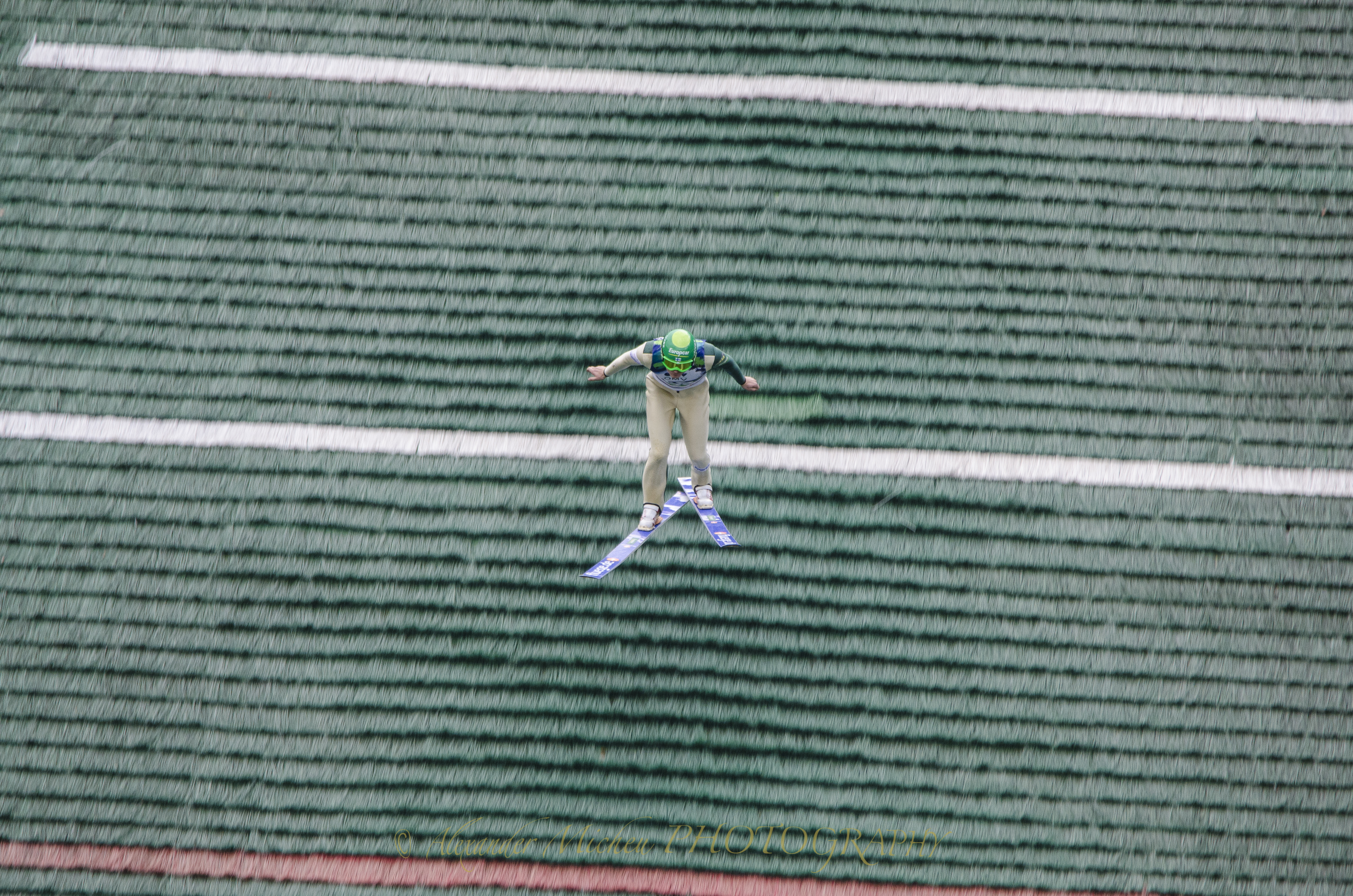

Personal information
- Born: 1 January 1988 (age 38) Rovaniemi, Finland
Medal record
Men's Nordic combined
Representing Finland
World Championships
Gold medal – first place	2007 Sapporo	4 x 5 km team

Janne Pekka Ryynänen (born 1 January 1988 in Rovaniemi) is a Finnish Nordic combined athlete who has been competing since 2003. His ski club is Ounasvaaran hiihtoseura. One of his greatest achievements include a gold medal from 4 x 5 km team competition at Sapporo 2007, where he had the longest jump of the Finnish team. Ryynänen's best individual finish was fourth in the 10 km individual large hill event at Liberec in 2009.

Ryynänen's best finish at the Winter Olympics was seventh in the 4 x 5 km team event at Vancouver in 2010 while his best individual finish was 12th in the 10 km individual large hill event at those same games.

His lone World Cup victory was at a 4 x 5 km team event at Italy in 2007 while his best individual finish was second in Finland twice, both in 2008.
