= Mathieu Martinez =

French Nordic combined skier (born 1982)

Mathieu Martinez (born May 26, 1982) is a French Nordic combined skier who has competed since 2002. He finished sixth in the 4 x 5 km team event at the 2007 FIS Nordic World Ski Championships in Sapporo and earned his best individual finish of 18th in the 7.5 km sprint at the 2003 in Val di Fiemme.

Martinez has a total of seven individual victories from 2001 to 2005, all in various World Cup B events. His best individual World Cup finish was eighth in a 7.5 km sprint event in Finland in 2002.
