= Nordic combined at the FIS Nordic World Ski Championships 2007 =

The Nordic combined at the FIS Nordic World Ski Championships 2007 took place at the FIS Nordic World Ski Championships 2007 in Sapporo, Japan on February 23, February 25, and March 3, 2007.

Finland, who had won one gold medal in the event since 1950 despite having skiers such as Hannu Manninen and Samppa Lajunen, with a combined 63 event wins and five overall wins in the FIS Nordic Combined World Cup, won the most gold medals at these Championships, with two. However, they could not prevent Germany's Ronny Ackermann from winning his third individual gold medal in succession, thus becoming the first Nordic combined athlete to win three times in succession.

Bill Demong became the third American to win a medal in any event at the Nordic World Ski Championships, four years after Johnny Spillane won gold in the Nordic combined sprint, while the Norwegian skiers, who won three medals and one gold in 2005, failed to defend their team gold without 2005 sprint bronze medallist Kristian Hammer. Austria won no medals for the first time since 1995, with Felix Gottwald being outsprinted for the team bronze and finishing 23 seconds behind the winners in the sprint. The French showed their dominance in the ski jumping part of the competition with a lead in the individual and third place in the sprint, but could not maintain those positions in the cross-country part of the event.

== 7.5 km sprint ==
February 23, 2007 at the Okurayama (HS134) jumping hill and the Sapporo Dome. The top three skiers after the ski jumping part of the competition were Kircheisen, Anssi Koivuranta of Finland, and Maxime Laheurte of France. Koivuranta would finish fourth while Laheurte would finish 10th. Manninen edged Moan at the line in a dramatic sprint to the finish. Defending champion Ronny Ackermann (Germany) finished eighth while Olympic Champion Felix Gottwald of Austria finished fifth. The race was marred by a crash during the ski jumping part of the competition that sent Daito Takahashi of Japan to the hospital. Takahasi would not return for the rest of the championships as a result.

HS134 hill

Rank	Athlete	Jump (m)	Points
1	Björn Kircheisen (GER)	134.0	130.8
2	Anssi Koivuranta (FIN)	131.0	126.7
3	Maxime Laheurte (FRA)	129.5	123.9
4	David Kreiner (AUT)	125.5	121.1
5	Ronny Ackermann (GER)	125.5	119.1
5	Jason Lamy Chappuis (FRA)	125.5	119.1
5	Petter Tande (NOR)	125.5	119.1

7.5 km

Medal	Athlete	Start time (Position)	Finish Time
Gold	Hannu Manninen (FIN)	+49.0 (9)	17:40.2
Silver	Magnus Moan (NOR)	+47.0 (8)	17:40.5
Bronze	Björn Kircheisen (GER)	0.0 (1)	18:09.7
4	Anssi Koivuranta (FIN)	+16.0 (2)	18:15.4
5	Felix Gottwald (AUT)	+52.0 (10)	18:32.3
6	Petter Tande (NOR)	+47.0 (5)	18:38.1
7	Jason Lamy Chappuis (FRA)	+47.0 (5)	18:38.4
8	Ronny Ackermann (GER)	+47.0 (5)	18:38.8
9	David Kreiner (AUT)	+39.0 (4)	18:58.1
10	Maxime Laheurte (FRA)	+28.0 (3)	18:58.7

== 15 km Individual Gundersen ==
March 3, 2007 at the Miyanomori (HS100) jumping hill and the Shirahatayama cross-country course. The defending champion of this event was Ronny Ackermann of Germany. Leaders after the ski jumping part of the competition were Lamy-Chappuis (who would finish 17th), Koivuranta, and Bieler. (who would finish fourth). World Cup leader Hannu Manninen (Finland) had a disappointing ski jump part of the competition with a 24th-place finish. Manninen skied the fastest part of the cross country part of the competition (36:31.6) to finish sixth. The real star of the competition was Ackermann, who started fifth after ski jumping and would have the eighth-fastest cross country time to win the event by 8.5 seconds. American Bill Demong had the second fastest time in the cross country part of the competition to edge Koivuranta for the silver. Ackermann is the first person to ever win the event three consecutive times at the World Championships and the first person to win the event at a World Championships or Winter Olympics level since Ulrich Wehling (who was now race director of all Nordic combined events) did it at the 1972, 1976, and 1980 Winter Olympics.

HS100 hill

Rank	Athlete	Jump 1 (m)	Jump 2 (m)	Points
1	Jason Lamy-Chappuis (FRA)	96.0	99.5	260.5
2	Anssi Koivuranta (FIN)	96.5	101.5	257.5
3	Christoph Bieler (AUT)	97.0	95.0	255.0
4	Espen Rian (NOR)	97.0	97.5	254.5
5	Ronny Ackermann (GER)	95.0	95.5	252.0
6	Jaakko Tallus (FIN)	93.0	94.0	244.5

15 km

Medal	Athlete	Start time (Position)	Finish Time
Gold	Ronny Ackermann (GER)	+34.0 (5)	38:35.6
Silver	Bill Demong (USA)	+1:40.0 (8)	38:44.1
Bronze	Anssi Koivuranta (FIN)	+12.0 (2)	38:44.3
4	Christoph Bieler (AUT)	+47.0 (3)	39:34.9
5	Felix Gottwald (AUT)	+2:38.0 (17)	39:42.8
6	Hannu Manninen (FIN)	+3:20.0 (24)	39:51.6
7	Björn Kircheisen (GER)	+1:48.0 (11)	39:52.3
8	Espen Rian (NOR)	+24.0 (4)	40:14.2
9	Sebastian Haseney (GER)	+2:52.0 (21)	40:25.6
10	Magnus Moan (NOR)	+2:42.0 (18)	40:34.3

== 4 x 5 km freestyle team ==
February 25, 2007 at the Okurayama (HS134) jumping hill and the Shirahatayama cross-country course. The defending champions were the Norwegian team of Petter Tande, Håvard Klemetsen, Magnus Moan, and Kristian Hammer. Finland took the lead after the ski jumping section, having more than forty seconds on the other teams, and led until the third leg of the relay when Tino Edelmann caught up with Jaakko Tallus. Tallus remained on his trail for the entire race, sending Hannu Manninen and Björn Kircheisen out in the final leg. Like in the sprint, Kircheisen remained in the hunt for two thirds of the race, but lost contact on the final climb. Austria and Norway had already settled for bronze on the second stage, a battle eventually won by Norway. Later in the championships, Hannu's younger sister Pirjo would earn gold in the women's cross country 4 x 5 km relay, making them the first brother and sister to ever win gold at the same championship.

HS134 hill

Rank	Team	Jumpers	Jump 1 (m)	Jump 2 (m)	Points
1	Finland	Janne Ryynänen	138.5	138.5	1043.3
1	Finland	Jaakko Tallus	130.0	130.0	1043.3
1	Finland	Hannu Manninen	130.0	129.5	1043.3
1	Finland	Anssi Koivuranta	136.5	136.0	1043.3
2	Norway	Petter Tande	134.0	124.5	1003.9
2	Norway	Håvard Klemetsen	132.0	131.5	1003.9
2	Norway	Magnus Moan	127.5	122.0	1003.9
2	Norway	Espen Rian	137.5	140.5	1003.9
3	Germany	Ronny Ackermann	129.5	128.5	993.9
3	Germany	Tino Edelmann	126.0	123.5	993.9
3	Germany	Sebastian Haseney	130.0	125.0	993.9
3	Germany	Björn Kircheisen	132.5	142.0	993.9

4 x 5 km freestyle

Medal	Team	Athletes	Start Time (Position)	Finish Time
Gold	Finland	Anssi Koivuranta	0.0 (1)	49:14.9
Gold	Finland	Janne Ryynänen	0.0 (1)	49:14.9
Gold	Finland	Jaakko Tallus	0.0 (1)	49:14.9
Gold	Finland	Hannu Manninen	0.0 (1)	49:14.9
Silver	Germany	Sebastian Haseney	+49.0 (3)	49:43.3
Silver	Germany	Ronny Ackermann	+49.0 (3)	49:43.3
Silver	Germany	Tino Edelmann	+49.0 (3)	49:43.3
Silver	Germany	Björn Kircheisen	+49.0 (3)	49:43.3
Bronze	Norway	Håvard Klemetsen	+39.0 (2)	50:26.9
Bronze	Norway	Espen Rian	+39.0 (2)	50:26.9
Bronze	Norway	Petter Tande	+39.0 (2)	50:26.9
Bronze	Norway	Magnus Moan	+39.0 (2)	50:26.9
4	Austria	Christoph Bieler	+1:01.0 (4)	50:27.3
4	Austria	David Kreiner	+1:01.0 (4)	50:27.3
4	Austria	Mario Stecher	+1:01.0 (4)	50:27.3
4	Austria	Felix Gottwald	+1:01.0 (4)	50:27.3
5	Switzerland	Ronny Heer	+2:53.0 (7)	52:58.7
5	Switzerland	Andreas Hurschler	+2:53.0 (7)	52:58.7
5	Switzerland	Seppi Hurschler	+2:53.0 (7)	52:58.7
5	Switzerland	Ivan Rieder	+2:53.0 (7)	52:58.7
6	France	Mathieu Martinez	+1:34.0 (5)	53:26.7
6	France	François Braud	+1:34.0 (5)	53:26.7
6	France	Maxime Laheurte	+1:34.0 (5)	53:26.7
6	France	Jason Lamy Chappuis	+1:34.0 (5)	53:26.7
