= 2007 World Junior Championships =

2007 World Junior Championships may refer to:

- Figure skating: 2007 World Junior Figure Skating Championships
- Ice hockey: 2007 World Junior Ice Hockey Championships
- Motorcycle speedway:
  - 2007 Individual Speedway Junior World Championship
  - 2007 Team Speedway Junior World Championship

== See also ==
- 2007 World Cup (disambiguation)
- 2007 Continental Championships (disambiguation)
- 2007 World Championships (disambiguation)
