= 2007 Continental Championships =

2007 Continental Championships may refer to:

== African Championships ==
- Multisport: 2007 All-Africa Games

== Asian Championships ==
- Athletics: 2007 Asian Athletics Championships
- Baseball: 2007 Asian Baseball Championship
- Football (soccer): 2007 AFC Asian Cup
- Football (soccer): 2007 AFC Champions League
- Multisport: 2007 Asian Indoor Games
- Multisport: 2007 Asian Winter Games
- Weightlifting: 2007 Asian Weightlifting Championships

== European Championships ==
- Artistic gymnastics: 2007 European Artistic Gymnastics Championships
- Athletics: 2007 European Indoor Championships in Athletics
- Basketball: EuroBasket 2007
- Figure skating: 2007 European Figure Skating Championships
- Football (soccer): 2006–07 UEFA Champions League
- Football (soccer): 2006–07 UEFA Cup
- Football (soccer): 2007 UEFA European Under-17 Championship
- Football (soccer): 2006–07 UEFA Women's Cup
- Futsal: 2007 UEFA Futsal Championship
- 2007 European Rowing Championships
- Show jumping: 2007 European Show Jumping Championship
- Volleyball: 2006–07 CEV Champions League
- Volleyball: 2006–07 Women's CEV Champions League

== Oceanian Championships ==
- Football (soccer): 2007 OFC Champions League
- Football (soccer): 2007 OFC Women's Championship

== Pan American Championships / North American Championships ==
- Football (soccer): 2007 Caribbean Cup
- Football (soccer): 2007 CONCACAF Champions' Cup
- Football (soccer): 2007 CONCACAF Gold Cup
- Multisport: 2007 Pan American Games

== South American Championships ==
- Athletics: 2007 South American Championships in Athletics
- Football (soccer): 2007 Copa América

== See also ==
- 2007 World Championships (disambiguation)
- 2007 World Junior Championships (disambiguation)
- 2007 World Cup (disambiguation)
- Continental championship (disambiguation)
