= Battista di Gerio =

Italian painter

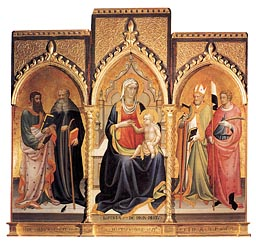
Triptych of Pieve di Camaiore

Battista di Gerio (active 1414 - 1418) was an Italian painter, active in a Gothic style in Pisa and Lucca. Among the works known are a triptych for the Pieve di Santo Stefano in Camaiore, province of Lucca. The triptych (1417) for the church of San Quirico all'Olivo of Lucca is now separated with the three pieces split among the Philadelphia Museum of Art (center panel with Madonna and Child); the Petit Palais of Avignon (left panel of Saints Rossore and Luca with donor); and the Museo Nazionale di Villa Guinigi in Lucca (right panel depicting Saints Quirico, Giulitta, and Pope Sixtus).

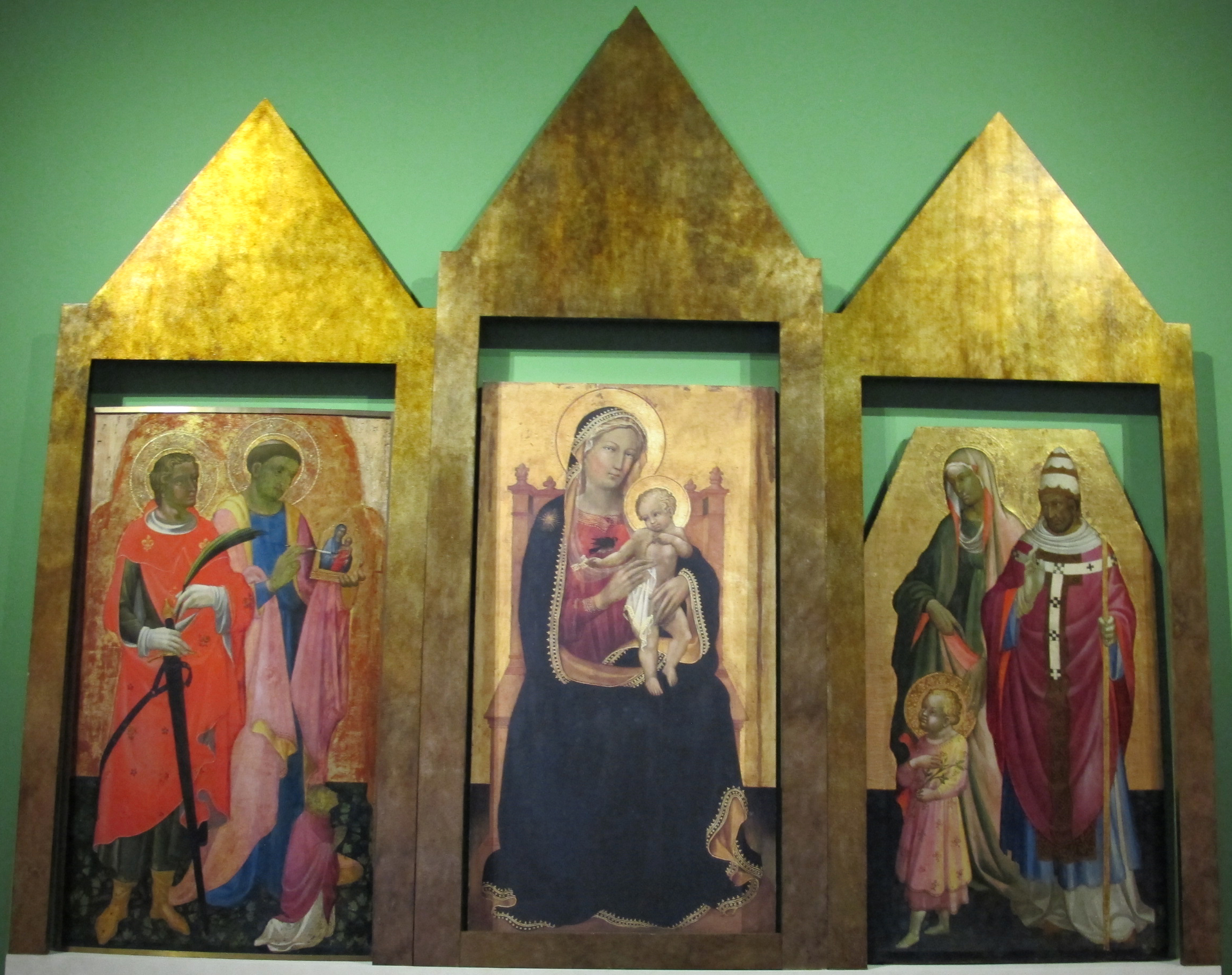
Triptych of San Quirico all'Olivo
