= Pori Airport =

Pori Airport Porin lentoasema

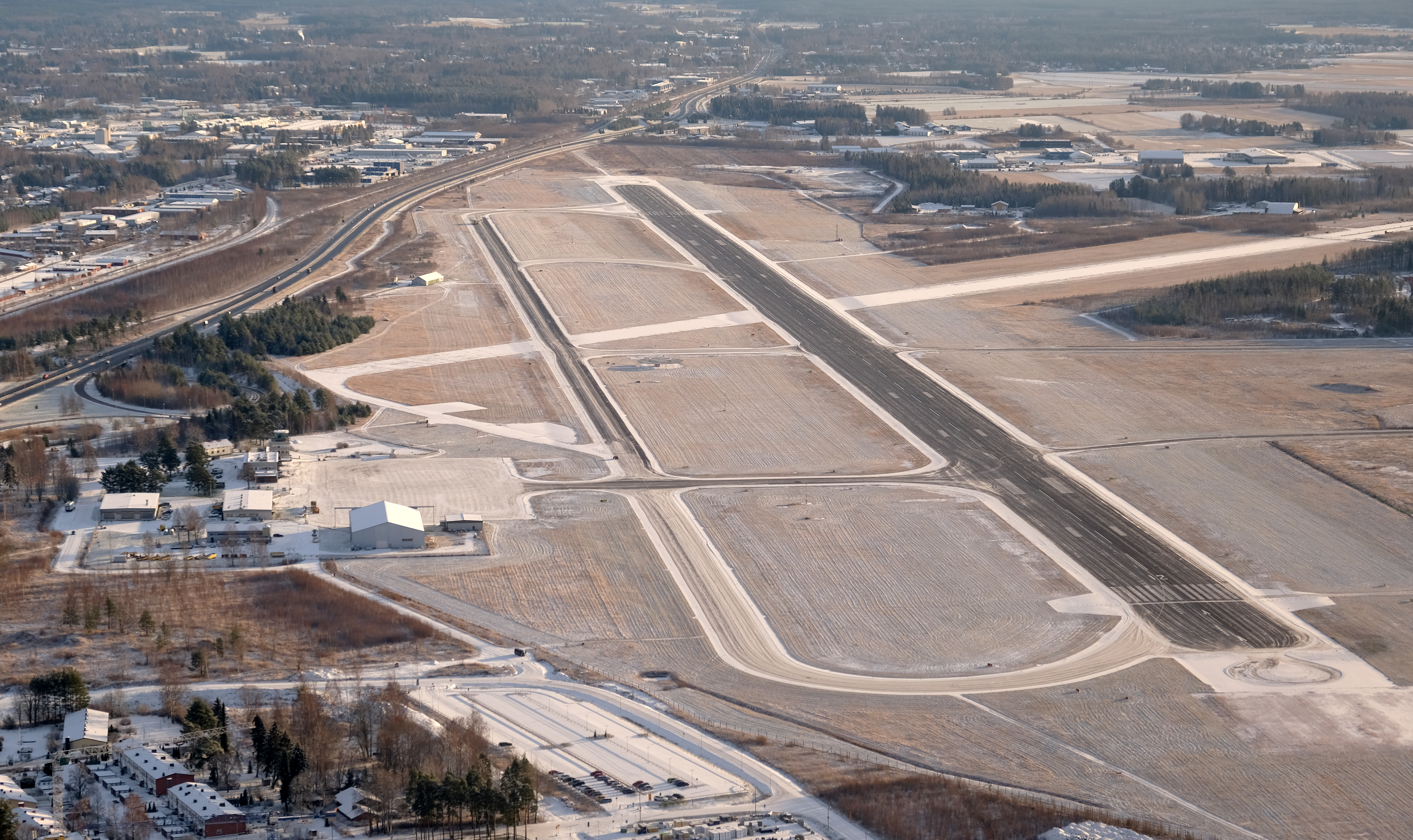
- IATA: POR; ICAO: EFPO

Summary
- Airport type: Public
- Operator: Finavia
- Serves: Pori
- Location: Pori, Finland
- Elevation AMSL: 45 ft (14 m)
- Coordinates: 61°27′41″N 021°47′52″E
- Website: finavia.fi

Map
- Location within Finland

Runways
Direction	Length		Surface
Direction	m	ft	Surface
12/30	2,351	7,713	Asphalt
17/35	801	2,628	Asphalt

Statistics (2018)
- Passengers: 17,625
- Source: AIP Finland; Statistics from Finavia

Pori Airport (Finnish: Porin lentoasema) (IATA: POR, ICAO: EFPO) is an airport in Pori, Finland. The airport is located 1.4 nautical miles (2.6 km; 1.6 mi) south of the Pori town centre. It has two check-in desks, and a cafeteria service. During 2011 Pori Airport served 54,056 passengers, an increase of 25.2% from previous year. However, in 2014 it was down to 24 983.

== History ==
During Continuation War, Pori airfield was used by Luftwaffe. The aviation equipment depot Feldluftpark 3/XI Pori operating at the airfield was from where Germans dispatched aircraft to the north and carried out major overhauls.

== Facilities ==
The airport is at an elevation of 13 metres (43 ft) above mean sea level. It has two asphalt paved runways: 12/30 measures 2,351 by 60 metres (7,713 ft × 197 ft) and 17/35 is 801 by 30 metres (2,628 ft × 98 ft).

The Finnish Aviation Academy is a flight school based at Pori Airport. As is the Satakunta Parachute club "Satakunnan Laskuvarjourheilijat". Flight training for private pilots (PPL/LAPL-licences) is given by local flight school Porin Lentotilaus Oy.

== Airlines and destinations ==
Airlines	Destinations
BASe Airlines	Helsinki

== Statistics ==
Annual passenger statistics for Pori Airport
Year	Domestic passengers	International passengers	Total passengers	Change
2005	52,456	7,734	60,190	+5.5% ▲
2006	58,196	6,191	64,387	+7.0% ▲
2007	58,962	6,952	65,914	+2.4% ▲
2008	55,839	10,469	66,308	+0.9% ▲
2009	50,961	11,169	62,130	−6.9% ▼
2010	36,458	6,703	43,161	−30.5% ▼
2011	46,175	7,881	54,056	+25.2% ▲
2012	14,932	20,381	35,313	−34.7% ▼
2013	16,275	9,954	26,229	−25.7% ▼
2014	7,406	17,577	24,943	−4.8% ▼
2015	543	10,523	11,066	−55.7% ▼
2016	3,683	5,946	9,629	−13.0% ▼
2017	9,645	13,538	23,183	+140.8% ▲
2018	5,789	11,836	17,625	−24.0% ▼
2019	6,817	7,598	14,415	−18.2% ▼
2020	5,183	131	5,314	−63.1% ▼
2021	4,181	521	4,702	−11.5% ▼
2022	8,535	3,094	11,628	147.3% ▲
2023	7,866	4,211	12,077	3.9% ▲
2024	9,034	3,448	12,482	3.4% ▲
2025	9,145	3,711	12,856	3.0% ▲

== Ground transportation ==
Means of transport at Pori Airport
Means of transport	Operator	Route	Destinations	Website	Notes
Bus	Matkahuolto	--	Bus station (Finnish: Linja-autoasema)	www.matkahuolto.fi	Every hour

== See also ==
- List of airports in Finland
- List of the largest airports in the Nordic countries
