= Matthias Buxhofer =

Austrian cyclist (born 1973)

Personal information
- Born: 30 September 1973 (age 53) Feldkirch, Vorarlberg, Austria

Cycling career
- Sport: Cycling
- Current team: Retired
- Discipline: Road
- Role: Rider

Amateur teams
- 1997: Scrigno–Gaerne (stagiaire)
- 1999: Elk Haus
- 1999: Post Swiss Team (stagiaire)

Professional teams
- 2000–2002: Phonak
- 2004–2005: Volksbank–Ideal Leingrüber

Matthias Buxhofer (born 30 September 1973) is an Austrian former professional road racing cyclist. Professional from 2000 to 2005, he rode in the 2002 Giro d'Italia, finishing 55th overall. He also competed in the road race at the 2000 Summer Olympics, and finished in 51st place.

== Major results ==
1993
3rd National Cyclo-cross Championships
1994
1st Prologue Tour of Austria
1st Burgenland Rundfahrt
3rd National Cyclo-cross Championships
1995
1st Stage 4 Tour of Austria
2nd National Cyclo-cross Championships
3rd Straßenengler Radsporttag
1996
2nd National Cyclo-cross Championships
1997
3rd National Cyclo-cross Championships
3rd Overall Uniqa Classic
1998
1st Overall Istrian Spring Trophy
3rd Overall Uniqa Classic
1999
2nd National Hill-climb Championships
2000
1st Wartenberg-Rundfahrt
1st Vorarlberg GP
7th Overall Tour of Germany
2001
1st Stage 5 Tour of Germany
3rd Overall Niedersachsen Rundfahrt
2002
2nd Schynberg Rundfahrt
3rd National Time Trial Championships
