= 2007 World Championships =

2007 World Championships may refer to:

- Alpine skiing: Alpine World Ski Championships 2007
- American Football: 2007 IFAF World Championship
- Aquatics: 2007 World Aquatics Championships
- Athletics: 2007 World Championships in Athletics
  - Cross-country running: 2007 IAAF World Cross Country Championships
  - Road running: 2007 IAAF World Road Running Championships
- Badminton: 2007 BWF World Championships
- Bandy: Bandy World Championship 2007
- Biathlon: Biathlon World Championships 2007
- Boxing: 2007 World Amateur Boxing Championships
- Chess: FIDE World Chess Championship 2007
- Curling:
  - 2007 Ford World Men's Curling Championship
  - 2007 World Women's Curling Championship
- Darts: 2007 BDO World Darts Championship
- Darts: 2007 PDC World Darts Championship
- Figure skating: 2007 World Figure Skating Championships
- Ice hockey: 2007 Men's World Ice Hockey Championships
- Ice hockey: 2007 Women's World Ice Hockey Championships
- Netball: 2007 Netball World Championships
- Nordic skiing: FIS Nordic World Ski Championships 2007
- Rowing: 2007 World Rowing Championships
- Speed skating:
  - Allround: 2007 World Allround Speed Skating Championships
  - Sprint: 2007 World Sprint Speed Skating Championships
  - Single distances: 2007 World Single Distance Speed Skating Championships
- Weightlifting: 2007 World Weightlifting Championships

== See also ==
- 2007 World Cup (disambiguation)
- 2007 Continental Championships (disambiguation)
- 2007 World Junior Championships (disambiguation)
