= Finnish Aviation Academy =

Flight school in Pori, Finland

Coordinates: 61.459366°N 21.78546°E

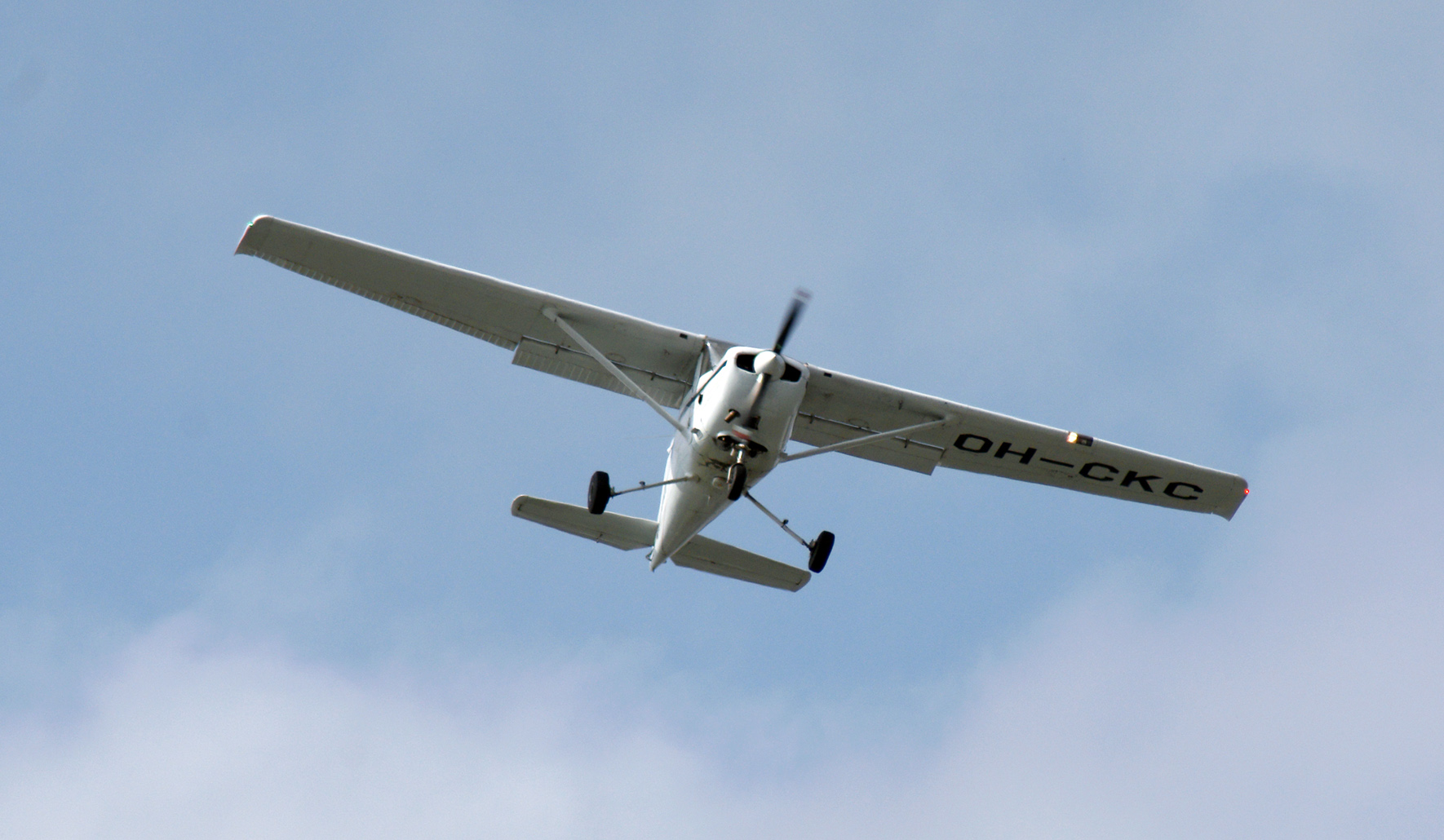
Cessna 152 of Finnish Aviation Academy

Finnish Aviation Academy Ltd (Finnish: Suomen Ilmailuopisto Oy, FINAA for short) is an aviation school based in Pori, Finland. It is located near the Pori Airport. The academy is a private school owned by the state of Finland, the national airline Finnair and the city of Pori.

== History ==
Finnish Aviation Academy was established 1964 in Helsinki by Finnair. It was transferred to Kuopio in 1976 and later in 1985 to Pori as the Satakunta Air Command was moved to Tampere–Pirkkala Airport. Academy was originally known as Finnair Aviation Academy and renamed in 2002. During 2009-2011 academy trained also helicopter pilots to fill the need for new pilots in Finland.

== Fleet ==
- Cessna 172
- Cessna 152
- Diamond DA42
- EMB-500
- Extra 300L

== Notable alumni ==
- Hannu Manninen
