= Espen Rian =

Norwegian Nordic combined skier

Medal record

Men's Nordic combined

World Championships
Bronze medal – third place	2007 Sapporo	4 x 5 km team

Espen Rian (born February 11, 1981) is a Norwegian Nordic combined skier who has competed since 2002. At the 2010 Winter Olympics, he finished fifth in the 4 x 5 km team and 35th in the individual large hill event.

Rian's best finish at the FIS Nordic World Ski Championships was a bronze medal in the 4 x 5 km team event at Sapporo in 2007 with his best individual finish of eighth in the 15 km individual event at those same championships.

== Professional information ==
His best World Cup finish was third in a 4 x 5 km team event in Italy in 2007 while his best individual finish was fifth at a 7.5 km compact sprint event at Norway the following year.

== Personal information ==
Rian is 1.77 m tall, weighing 67 kg, with blonde hair and blue eyes. He spent his first years in Hermstad, Norway, with his parents and an older brother, later moving to Trondheim to attend sports high school at 15. Rian's hobbies include golf, tennis, football and hunting. He lives in Trondheim.
