= Santa Maria Assunta, Camaiore =

Roman Catholic church in Camaiore, Italy

Coordinates: 43.93810°N 10.30407°E

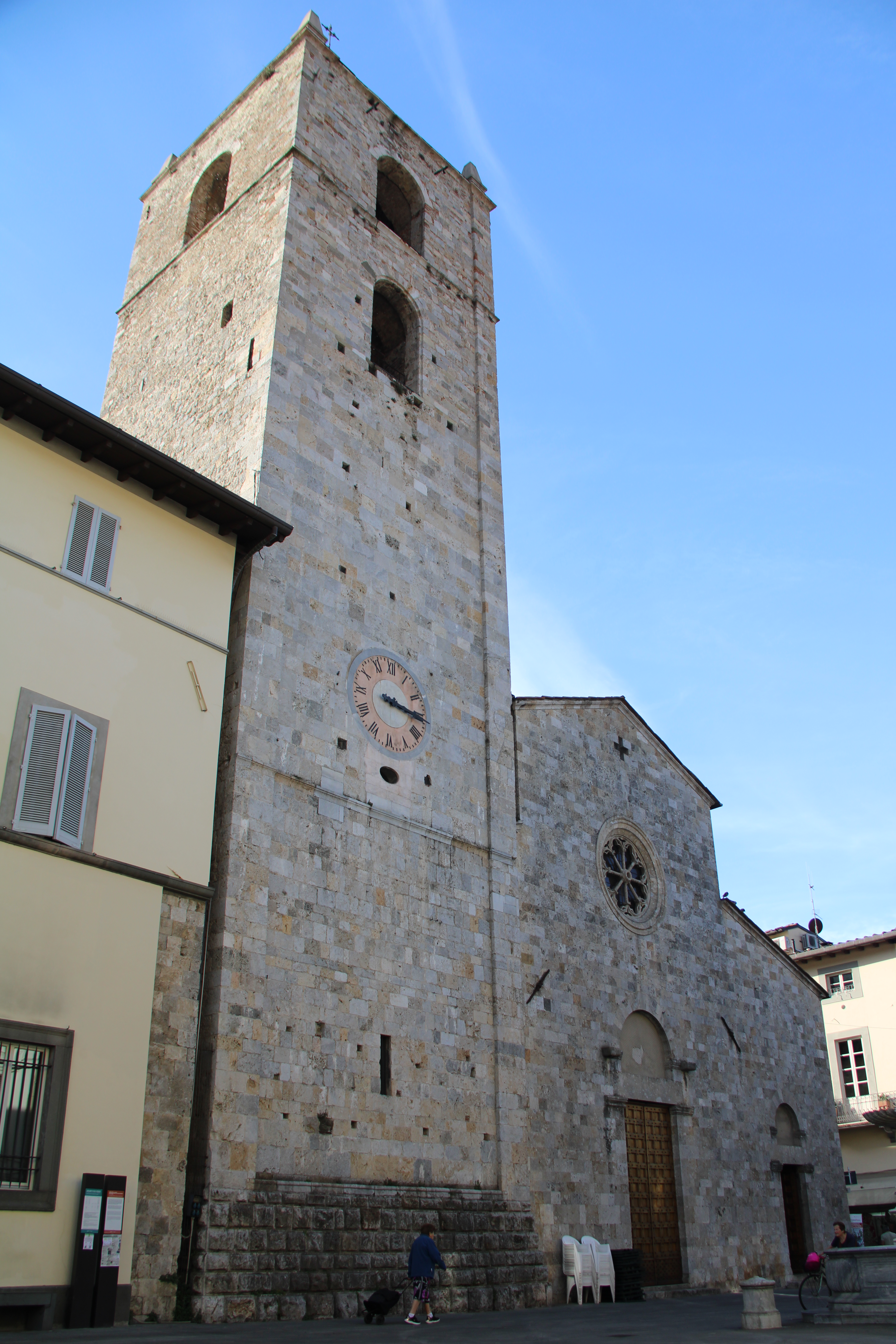
Facade and bell-tower of church

Santa Maria Assunta is a mixed Romanesque and Gothic-style, Roman Catholic parish church, with the facade on Piazza San Bernadino da Siena in the town center of Camaiore in the province of Lucca, Tuscany, Italy. The church is near the city hall of the town.

== History and description ==
A church titled Ecclesia Sanctae Mariae de Burgo Campi Majoris is documented here since 1260. It appears to have been consecrated in 1278. The stone bell-tower was completed in 1356. In 1387, the church was granted by pope Urban VI the privilege of celebrating baptism. In 1515, the church was granted the title of Collegiata, and in 1796, as collegiata insigne.

While the robust walls of stone with rounded portals recall Romanesque construction, the facade is tall and has a its top a rose window. The church has been modified over the centuries; in 1448 the building was widened, and the facade only completed in 1458. A major refurbishment took place in the 18th-century under the architect Tommaso Pezzini, The interior was adapted to late-baroque fashion and reconsecrated by the Archbishop of Lucca Filippo Sardi on 1799. The refurbishment in 1915 removed some of the baroque elements, and attempted to restore the structure to its Romanesque origins.

The nave is roofed with a barrel vault, while the aisles are surmounted by rib vaults. The side altars date to the 17th and 18th centuries, while the 19th-century main altar was designed by Vincenzo Santini. The 14th-century baptismal font at the entrance of the church contained sculpted reliefs depicting the Good Shepherd, Adam and Eve, the serpent with the apple, and the archangel guarding paradise. The other font has a relief representing a baptism with an inscription: “Venite filii audite me timore Domini docebo vos”. On both the sides of the relief are the Guinigi coat of arms and the emblem of Camaiore

The church has a 15th-century pipe organ restored by Benedetto and Luigi Tronci in the 18th-century and again in the following century. Of the works of art in the church is a 13th-century painted wooden crucifix on the first altar. In the Chapel of the Holy Sacrament, is a depiction of the Communion of the Apostles by Pier Dandini. In the chapel of the Virgin of the Annunciation, there is an altarpiece on this topic (1805) by Stefano Tofanelli. The church once had a Madonna statue by the 15th century sculptor Matteo Civitali, but that is now sheltered in the Museum of Sacred Art of Camaiore. In the apse are four canvas by the Benedetto Brandimante from Lucca: an Assumption of the Virgin; Saints Peter and Paul at the Coronation of the Virgin.
