= Anssi Koivuranta =

Finnish ski jumper

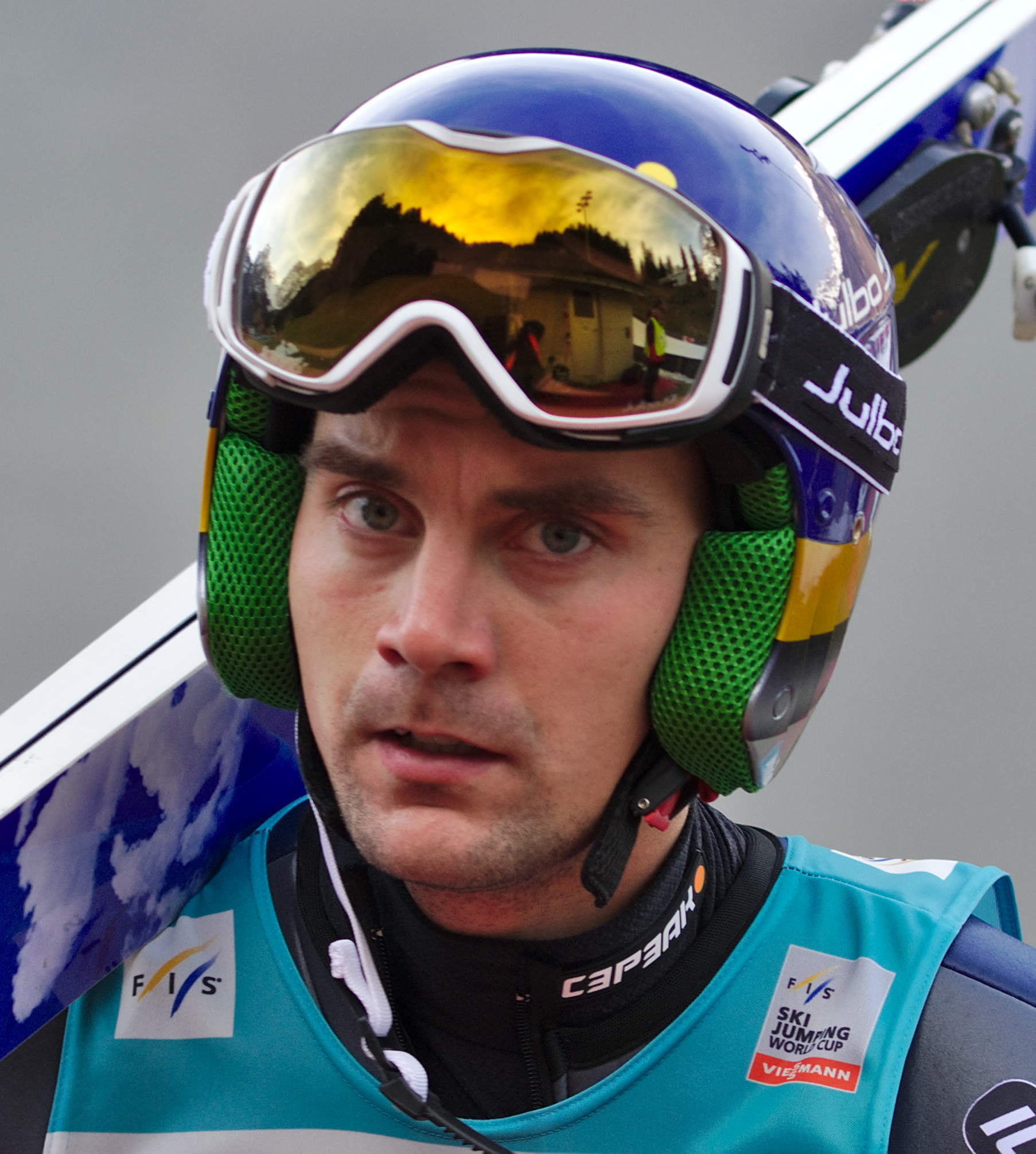

Personal information
- Full name: Anssi Einar Koivuranta
- Nationality: Finland
- Born: 3 July 1988 (age 38) Kuusamo, Finland
- Height: 175 cm (5 ft 9 in)

Sport
- Sport: Skiing
- Club: Kuusamon Erä-Veikot

World Cup career
- Seasons: 2004–2010 (Nordic combined); 2011–2015 (ski jumping)
- Indiv. starts: 68 (ski jumping); 90 (Nordic combined)
- Indiv. podiums: 1 (ski jumping); 24 (Nordic combined)
- Indiv. wins: 1 (ski jumping); 7 (Nordic combined)
- Team starts: 15 (ski jumping); 3 (Nordic combined)
- Team podiums: 1 (Nordic combined)
- Team wins: 1 (Nordic combined)
- Overall titles: 1 (2009)

Achievements and titles
- Personal bests: 214.5 m (704 ft); Planica, 19 March 2009
Medal record
Men's Nordic combined
Olympic Games
| Bronze medal – third place | 2006 Turin | Team 4 x 5 km |
FIS Nordic World Ski Championships
| Gold medal – first place | 2007 Sapporo | Team 4 x 5 km |
| Bronze medal – third place | 2007 Sapporo | Individual 15 km |
- Updated on 10 February 2016

Anssi Einar Koivuranta (born 3 July 1988) is a retired Finnish ski jumper and former Nordic combined skier, best known for winning the 2008–09 FIS Nordic Combined World Cup. He won the gold medal in the 4 × 5 km team event and a bronze medal in the 15 km Gundersen race at the 2007 FIS Nordic World Ski Championships in Sapporo. After winning a Ski Jumping World Cup competition in Innsbruck on 4 January 2014, Koivuranta became the first ever athlete in history of ski jumping to win an event in both Nordic combined and the ski jumping World Cup.

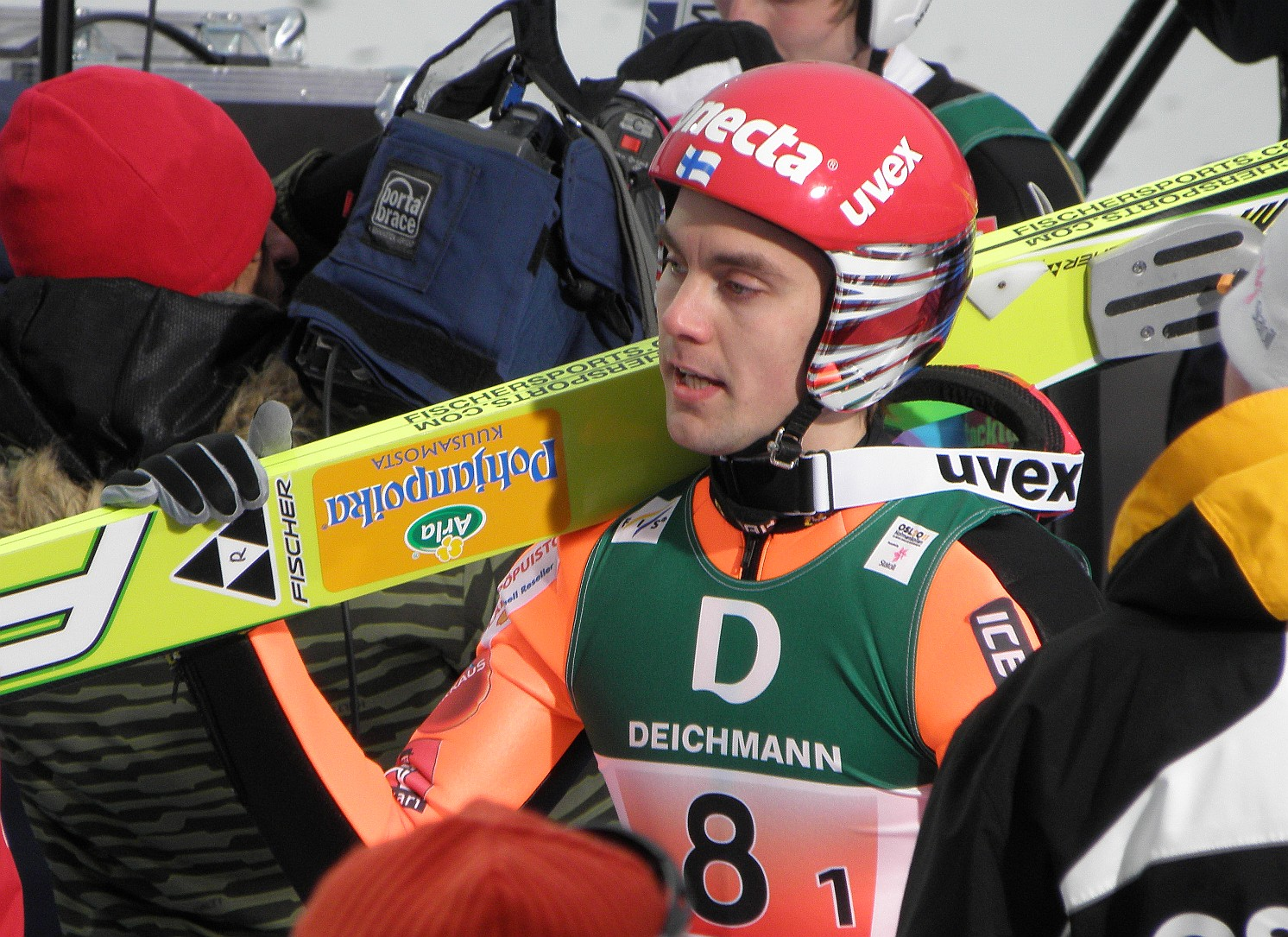
Koivuranta in 2011

== Early life and career ==
Born in Kuusamo, Koivuranta represents the sports club Kuusamon Erä Veikot from Kuusamo. He began ski jumping when he was six years old, breaking his arm in a jump during his first year. He took up Nordic combined when he was eight. Koivuranta eventually grew to be 1.72 m (5 ft 8 in) tall; his weight is 55 kilograms (121 lb).

Koivuranta made his international debut in the B World Cup in March 2003. He competed in the World Cup for the first time in Kuusamo 2003, but was disqualified from both races because his skis were too long compared to his length and weight (BMI rule). In February 2004 he won a bronze medal at the Junior World Championships in Stryn. In March 2004, at the very end of the 2003–04 season, Koivuranta made his proper debut in the World Cup circuit—in two races in Lahti, he finished 24th and 23rd respectively.

== Nordic combined career (2003–2010) ==
=== World Cup breakthrough ===
In December the same year, in early 2004/05 season, he finished among the top ten for the first time, with an eighth place in the sprint race in Trondheim. His first podium achievement came in January 2005, with a third place in Sapporo. Almost one month later, he finished sixth in the sprint distance at the 2005 World Championships. Before the season was over, he would win a bronze medal at the Junior World Championships in Rovaniemi.

=== Period 2005–2008 ===
The 2005/06 season saw Koivuranta open with a second place, in Kuusamo in November. During the course of the season he achieved another second place as well as two third places. He also earned a bronze medal in the 4 x 5 team event at the 2006 Winter Olympics in Turin. In December 2006 he achieved two second places in a row, and followed with consistent achievements among the top fifteen. At the 2007 World Championships in Sapporo he won the gold medal in the 4 x 5 km team event, a bronze medal in the 15 km Gundersen race and finished fourth in the sprint. At his last Junior World Championships, held in Tarvisio in March 2007, he won a gold and a silver medal. The same level of performance continued in the 2007–08 season, placing him twice on the podium.

=== World Cup winner 2008/09 ===
Having been among the better ski jumpers in the Nordic combined sport since 2004, Koivuranta struggled somewhat in the cross-country skiing part. Concentrating on improving his cross-country skiing abilities, from 2005 he managed to improve little by little. He owed his increased share of podium achievements to this training. By 2008/09 season Koivuranta had become one of the better cross-country skiers as well, in part thanks to a newly appointed coach to the Finnish national team. Koivuranta won his first World Cup race in November 2008 in Kuusamo. He followed up with victories in Trondheim and Oberhof in December, and Schonach and Chaux Neuve in January. The World Championships in Liberec 2009, was not successful for Koivuranta as he did not win any medals at all, and his best results were two fourth places . Koivuranta was also sick during the World Championships which affected his results and that he was unable to compete in the team competition.

On 14 March Koivuranta won the Gundersen event at Vickersund, the penultimate race of the season. The following day he finished 8th in the 2nd Gundersen of the weekend. This was high enough for him to clinch the 2008–09 FIS Nordic Combined World Cup, his first world cup title, finishing 100 points above the man in second place, Magnus Moan.

=== Planica 2009 ===
Koivuranta's personal best ski jump is 214,5 metres as trial jumper in Planica. It was in the second training round that he jumped 214,5 and was in second place. It is worth mentioning that the best jumper jumped with lower speed.

=== Season 2009/10 ===
Koivuranta's best placement for the 2009–10 season was a 2nd place. The season as a whole was a disappointment for Anssi who struggled with persistent sickness throughout the winter and as a result, failed to match the successes of his previous championship year. In January 2010 he had a problem with a tooth injury. At the 2010 Winter Olympics, Koivuranta finished seventh in the 4 x 5 km team and eighth in the 10 km individual normal hill. He competed in the 10 km individual large hill event, but withdrew prior to the start of the cross-country section of that event, following a poor result in the ski jumping section in difficult conditions. This would also prove to be Koivuranta's final season in Nordic combined before his transition to ski jumping.

== Nordic combined world cup ==
=== Standings ===
| Season | Overall | SP | WGP |
|---|---|---|---|
| 2003/04 | 51 | 46 | — |
| 2004/05 | 21 | 26 | — |
| 2005/06 | 10 | 11 | — |
| 2006/07 | 7 | 6 | 7 |
| 2007/08 | 11 | 16 | — |
| 2008/09 | 1st place, gold medalist(s) | — | — |
| 2009/10 | 11 | — | — |

=== Wins ===
| No. | Season | Date | Location | Race | Hill / Run | Size |
|---|---|---|---|---|---|---|
| 1 | 2008/09 | 30 November 2008 | (Finland) Kuusamo | Gundersen | Rukatunturi HS142 / 10 km | LH |
| 2 | 2008/09 | 7 December 2008 | (Norway) Trondheim | Gundersen | Granåsen HS140 / 10 km | LH |
| 3 | 2008/09 | 28 December 2008 | (Germany) Oberhof | Gundersen | Hans-Renner-Schanze HS140 / 10 km | LH |
| 4 | 2008/09 | 4 January 2009 | (Germany) Schonach | Gundersen | Langenwaldschanze HS96 / 10 km | NH |
| 5 | 2008/09 | 1 February 2009 | (France) Chaux Neuve | Gundersen | La Côté Feuillée HS100 / 10 km | NH |
| 6 | 2008/09 | 14 February 2009 | (Germany) Klingenthal | Gundersen | Vogtland Arena HS140 / 10 km | LH |
| 7 | 2008/09 | 14 March 2009 | (Norway) Vikersund | Gundersen | Vikersundbakken HS117 / 10 km | LH |

== Ski jumping career (2011–) ==
Ski jumping was the slightly better discipline for Koivuranta in the combined, although later in his career he became almost as good cross country skier as he was a ski jumper.

In 2009 Koivuranta had won the Finnish ski jumping championship, ahead of the national team ski jumpers. In March 2009 he jumped 214.5 metres in Planica ski flying hill.

In 2010 Koivuranta suffered Mycoplasma pneumonia. The disease prevented him from doing any physical endurance practice which resulted in his decision to fully concentrate on ski jumping. He got the right to compete in the Ski jumping World Cup by placing 15th and 3rd in the Summer Continental Cup competitions in October. The main goal for Koivuranta for the season 2010/11 was to get himself to the Finnish ski jumping team. Pekka Niemelä, the head coach of the national team, said that Koivuranta was already very close to the national team level.

April 5, 2011 Koivuranta said that he would continue with ski jumping instead of Nordic combined.

In 2011–12 season, he finished fourth in Lahti, improving his personal best World Cup result.

On January 4, 2014, Koivuranta took his first Ski Jumping World Cup victory in Innsbruck, thus making history and becoming the first athlete ever to win in both Nordic Combined and Ski Jumping World Cups. After placing 10th at Wisla and getting a further 9th place at Zakopane, Koivuranta gained praise from Finland's head coach Pekka Niemelä: "Koivuranta has started to stabilize his spot in the top ten. When you can (consistently) jump at such a high level, you will also start to get days when everything goes right getting you on top of the podium"

=== Hill Records ===
- Kanzlersgrund, the K-120 hill in Oberhof, with 147 metres.
- Vikersund K-105 which is 122,5 metres is also held by Koivuranta.
- Non-official record in Liberec K90 with 106,5 metres.
- At 148,5 metres he has also jumped the furthest in the Vogtlandarena in Klingenthal, but he fell just after landing as the pressure on his legs was too high.

== Ski jumping world cup ==
=== Standings ===
| Season | Overall | 4H | SF |
|---|---|---|---|
| 2010/11 | 40 | 9 | 23 |
| 2011/12 | 18 | 9 | 18 |
| 2012/13 | — | 9 | — |
| 2013/14 | 19 | 10 | 18 |
| 2014/15 | 64 | — | 42 |

=== Wins ===
| No. | Season | Date | Location | Hill | Size |
|---|---|---|---|---|---|
| 1 | 2013/14 | 4 January 2014 | (Austria) Innsbruck | Bergiselschanze HS130 | LH |
