= Hannu Manninen =

Finnish Nordic combined athlete (born 1978)

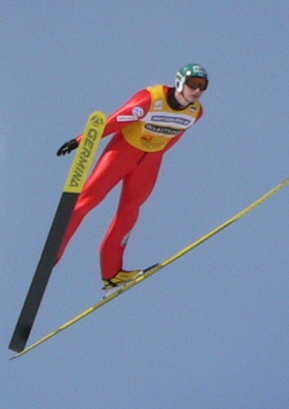

Personal information
- Full name: Hannu Kalevi Manninen
- Born: 17 April 1978 (age 48) Rovaniemi, Finland

Sport
- Sport: Skiing
- Club: Ounasvaaran Hiihtoseura

World Cup career
- Seasons: 1994–2008, 2009–2011, 2017–2018
- Indiv. podiums: 90
- Indiv. wins: 48
- Overall titles: 4 (2004, 2005, 2006, 2007)
Medal record
Men's Nordic combined
Representing Finland
Olympic Games
Gold medal – first place	2002 Salt Lake City	4 × 5 km team
Silver medal – second place	1998 Nagano	4 × 5 km team
Bronze medal – third place	2006 Turin	4 × 5 km team
World Championships
Gold medal – first place	1999 Ramsau	4 × 5 km team
Gold medal – first place	2007 Sapporo	7.5 km sprint
Gold medal – first place	2007 Sapporo	4 × 5 km team
Silver medal – second place	1997 Trondheim	4 × 5 km team
Bronze medal – third place	2001 Lahti	4 × 5 km team
Bronze medal – third place	2003 Val di Fiemme	4 × 5 km team

Hannu Kalevi Manninen (born 17 April 1978 in Rovaniemi) is a Finnish Nordic combined athlete. Debuting at the 1994 Winter Olympics in Lillehammer at the age of 15, he took his first medal three years later at the age of 18 when he won silver in the 4 × 5 km team event at the FIS Nordic World Ski Championships. At the 2002 Winter Olympics, he won a gold medal in the 4 × 5 km team event at the age of 23. He has five other Nordic skiing World Championships medals, earning three golds (4 × 5 km team: 1999, 2007 and 7.5 km sprint: 2007) and two bronzes (4 × 5 km team: 2001, 2003). He has two other Olympic team medals as well (silver: 1998, bronze: 2006).

Manninen formerly had the record for most wins (48) and most championship titles (4), after passing Kenji Ogiwara's records during the 2006–07 season, in the FIS Nordic Combined World Cup. He also has won the 7.5 km sprint event of the Nordic combined three times (2002, 2004, 2005) at the Holmenkollen ski festival.

As a cross country skier, he finished 8th in the individual sprint event at the 2002 Winter Olympics.

Manninen announced his first retirement from competition on 29 May 2008 to focus on his family and a future career as an airline pilot. He made his comeback to World Cup on 28 November 2009 in Ruka (Kuusamo), Finland, where he finished 2nd. Day after he won his first race after comeback. The first race in 2010 took place in Oberhof Germany where Manninen won for the 47th time in his sporting career. He made his second comeback on 7 January 2017 in Lahti, Finland, where he finished 18th.

== Personal life ==
His younger sister, Pirjo is a cross-country skier who has also won several World Championship medals, including three golds at the FIS Nordic World Ski Championships (Individual sprint: 2001, 4 × 5 km: 2007, 2009). They are the first brother-sister combination to ever win gold medals at the same championships.

Manninen graduated from the Finnish Aviation Academy in 2011 and is working for Finnair as of 2016.

== Cross-country skiing results ==
All results are sourced from the International Ski Federation (FIS).

=== Olympic Games ===
Year	Age	15 km	Pursuit	30 km	50 km	Sprint	4 × 10 km relay
2002	23	—	—	—	—	8	—

=== World Cup ===
==== Season standings ====
Season	Age			
Season	Age	Overall	Distance	Sprint
1993	14	NC	—N/a	—N/a
2003	24	60	—N/a	31
2004	25	NC	—	NC

== See also ==
- List of Olympic medalist families

== Sources ==
- ESPN.com May 29, 2008 announcement of Manninen's retirement. – accessed May 29, 2008.
- FIS Newsflash 177 on Manninen's potential retirement. April 30, 2008.
- Hannu Manninen at the International Ski and Snowboard Federation. Cross-country
- Hannu Manninen at the International Ski and Snowboard Federation. Nordic combined
- Holmenkollen winners since 1892 – click Vinnere for downloadable pdf file (in Norwegian)
- Official website
