= Florians =

Ecclesiastical order

Order of Flora
- Floriacenses
- Classification: Catholic
- Founder: Abbot Joachim of Flora
- Origin: 1189
- Merged into: Order of Cîteaux
- Defunct: 1570

The Florians, in Latin Floriacenses, were an altogether independent order during the feudal era, and not, as some consider, a branch of the Cistercians.

== History ==
The Order of Flora was founded in 1189 by the Abbot Joachim of Flora, by whom its constitutions were drawn up. Besides preserving a number of Cistercian observances, the founder added to the austerities of Cîteaux. The Florians went barefoot; their habits were white and very coarse. Their Breviary differed in the distribution of Offices from that of Cîteaux. The constitutions were approved by Pope Celestine III in 1196.

The order spread rapidly, soon numbering as many as thirty-five monasteries, but it seems not to have extended beyond Italy. In 1470, the regular abbots were replaced by commendatory abbots, but the abuses of this regime hastened the decline of the order.

In 1505, the Abbey of Flora and its affiliated monasteries were united to the Order of Cîteaux. In 1515, other Florian monasteries united themselves to the Grande Chartreuse (Carthusians) or to the Dominicans, and in 1570, after a century under the regime of commendatory abbots, not a single independent monastery remained, and the Order of Flora had ceased to exist. Under the Abbot of Flora were also four monasteries of religious women, who followed the Florian rule.
