= FIS Nordic World Ski Championships 2007 =

2007 edition of the FIS Nordic World Ski Championships

- Official logo for the FIS Nordic World Ski Championships 2007
- Host city: Sapporo, Japan
- Nations: 49
- Events: 18
- Opening: 22 February 2007
- Closing: 4 March 2007
- Main venue: Okurayama Ski Jump Stadium
- Website: Sapporo2007.com

The FIS Nordic World Ski Championships 2007 took place 22 February – 4 March 2007 in Sapporo, Japan. It was the second time this city has hosted these championships, having previously done so in the 1972 Winter Olympics. Sapporo was selected as venue by vote at the 43rd FIS World Congress in Portorož, Slovenia, on 6 June 2002. It also marked the third time the championships were hosted outside Europe in a year that did not coincide with the Winter Olympics; it was the first championship held in Asia. The ski jumping team normal hill event was not held, as it had been in 2005.

== Highlights ==
- The most successful competitor was Finland's Virpi Kuitunen who won three golds (team sprint, 30 km, and 4 x 5 km) and one bronze (individual sprint).
- 20-year-old Astrid Jacobsen from Norway won three medals in women's cross-country with a gold in the individual sprint and bronzes in the team sprint and 4 x 5 km.
- Lars Berger of Norway became the first person to win medals at both the biathlon and Nordic skiing world championships in the same year with Nordic skiing golds in the 15 km and 4 x 10 km events and a silver in the 4 x 7.5 km biathlon relay in Rasen-Antholz, Italy, in February.
- Indoor skiing was held for the first time at the Sapporo Dome with the cross-country sprint and the Nordic combined sprint events.
- Germany's Ronny Ackermann became the first person to win the Nordic combined 15 km individual Gundersen event in three straight championships.
- Hannu and Pirjo Manninen of Finland became the first brother-and-sister combination to win gold medals at the same championships with Hannu's wins in the Nordic combined 7.5 km sprint and 4 x 5 km team events, and Pirjo's win in the women's 4 x 5 km cross-country relay.
- Belarus earned their first championship medal with Leanid Karneyenka's surprise silver in the 15 km event.
- Petra Majdič of Slovenia earned her first championship medal and the first for the nation both for women and in cross-country skiing.
- Switzerland's Simon Ammann won medals in both individual hill competitions (silver: normal, gold: large) and had the longest jumps in the team large hill events.
- Adam Małysz of Poland won his fourth world championship gold medal with the largest victory in the history of the individual normal hill event, his third win in event of the last four championships.
- Despite being well run and well-organized, the championships attendance was only 90,000, mostly at the Sapporo Dome and the ski jumping hills of Miyanomori and Okurayama. This amount was only a third of what was there at the previous games at Oberstdorf.
- A record 697 doping tests were administered for the event, one of the largest in any international major sports outside the Winter Olympics, including urine, EPO urine, blood, blood transfusion, and human growth hormone testing. One positive EPO urine control was found on Sergey Shiryayev, whose case resulted in a two-year suspension at the FIS Council meeting in Portorož, Slovenia, in May 2007 (two other coaches received sanctions from the Russian ski federation), and nine start prohibitions were issued following pre-competition blood control. The cost for all FIS controls (827 total) was over CHF 1 million for the 2006–07 season at all skiing disciplines for all championships.

== Mascot ==
The mascot of the championships was Norkey, an Ezo deer (Ezo was the former name of Hokkaidō Island in Japan) named for combining the words "Nordic" and "ski" who wears a scarf in the symbol colors around his neck.

== Initial ranks ==
As of 16 February 2007, the top three World Cup positions were as follows:

Men	Leader	Second	Third
Nordic combined	Hannu Manninen (FIN)	Magnus Moan (NOR)	Christoph Bieler (AUT)
Ski jumping	Anders Jacobsen (NOR)	Gregor Schlierenzauer (AUT)	Adam Małysz (POL)
XC skiing, overall	Tobias Angerer (GER)	Alexander Legkov (RUS)	Tor Arne Hetland (NOR)
XC skiing, distance	Tobias Angerer (GER)	Vincent Vittoz (FRA)	Alexander Legkov (RUS)
XC skiing, sprint	Jens Arne Svartedal (NOR)	Tor Arne Hetland (NOR)	Trond Iversen (NOR)
Women	Leader	Second	Third
XC skiing, overall	Virpi Kuitunen (FIN)	Marit Bjørgen (NOR)	Kateřina Neumannová (CZE)
XC skiing, distance	Virpi Kuitunen (FIN)	Kateřina Neumannová (CZE)	Riitta Liisa Roponen (FIN)
XC skiing, sprint	Natalya Matveyeva (RUS)	Virpi Kuitunen (FIN)	Yevgeniya Shapovalova (RUS)

Cross-country skiing's Tour de Ski winners were Kuitunen for the women and Angerer for the men; both got 400 World Cup points for their respective TdS victories. Jacobsen won ski jumping's Four Hills Tournament, and Manninen won Nordic combined's Tour of Germany.

The last officially published entry list included 485 athletes from 49 countries. This included 125 women from 33 nations and 197 men from 48 nations in Cross-country skiing, 68 men from 17 nations in Nordic combined, and 93 men from 21 nations in Ski jumping.

== Preparation ==
- Three-time Olympic and six-time World Championship medalist Masahiko Harada (ski jumping) was appointed Ambassador to the championships on 12 July 2006.
- Media accreditation closed on 30 September 2006. During the event, Hiroshi Takeuchi of the Kyodo News (Japan) served as chief of the National Press and head of the Press Centers, and Kurt Henauer of the FIS served as International Press Chief. As of 31 January 2007, at least 1150 international media earned accreditation.
- Members of the organizing committee attended a technical directors' seminar on cross-country skiing in Tokyo on 28–29 October 2006 in an effort to expand cross-country in Japan, South Korea, and China
- FIS Vice President Yoshiro Ito of Japan, who is also on the event's organizing committee, stated in an interview with FIS that he sees growth will develop among Asian nations following this event since skiing in general is weak in Asia.
- Sapporo Mayor and Event Organizing Committee Chair Fumio Ueda, in an FIS interview, stated that "I am convinced that the Championships – held in Asia for the first time – will provide many children and young people, our future leaders, with lofty dreams and great hopes, and will enable everyone around the globe to share the emotions of this event, thus contributing to the pursuit of world peace."
- 450 pre-competition doping tests occurred for all cross-country skiers and Nordic combined skiers coordinated by the Japan Anti-Doping Agency (JADA) with support from the FIS Doping Control Coordinator from the FIS-appointed specialist agency, IDTM. Post-competition doping results were conducted by JADA with urine samples taken during the press conferences. The testing samples were conducted by the World Anti-Doping Agency (WADA) testing facilities in Tokyo. The top four athletes plus two randomly chosen athletes in all events were subjected. Out-of-competition testing was also conducted as well, a program that began in the aftermath of the FIS Nordic World Ski Championships 2001 doping scandal in Lahti, Finland, that has been successful in the Winter Olympics of Salt Lake City (2002) and Turin (2006) and the World Championships of Val di Fiemme (2003) and Oberstdorf (2005).

== Participating nations ==
49 nations were listed on the preliminary entry list.

- Andorra (1)
- Armenia (5)
- Australia (8)
- Austria (22)
- Belarus (12)
- Belgium (1)
- Brazil (3)
- Bulgaria (2)
- Canada (18)
- China (11)
- Croatia (2)
- Czech Republic (8)
- Denmark (1)
- Estonia (13)
- Ethiopia (1)
- Finland (29)
- France (19)
- Great Britain (1)
- Germany (31)
- Greece (5)
- Hungary (5)
- Ireland (1)
- Israel (2)
- Italy (19)
- Japan (24)
- Kazakhstan (28)
- Kenya (1)
- Kyrgyzstan (2)
- Latvia (3)
- Liechtenstein (1)
- Lithuania (1)
- Luxembourg (1)
- Macedonia (4)
- Norway (33)
- New Zealand (3)
- Poland (8)
- Portugal (1)
- Romania (2)
- Russia (32)
- Slovakia (8)
- Slovenia (15)
- South Africa (1)
- South Korea (6)
- Spain (2)
- Sweden (18)
- Switzerland (22)
- Turkey (3)
- Ukraine (14)
- United States (19)

== Venues ==
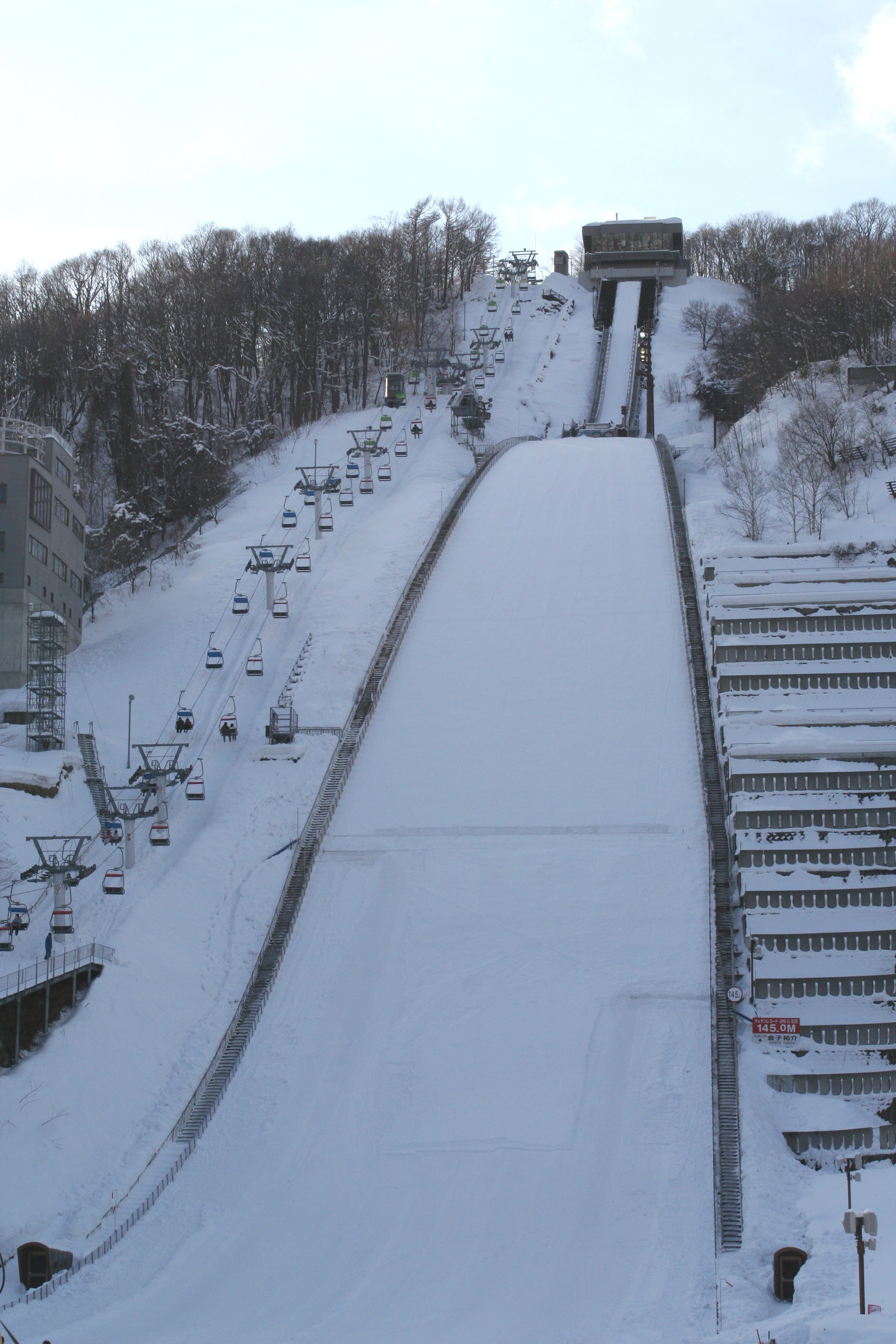
View of Okurayama Jumping Hill

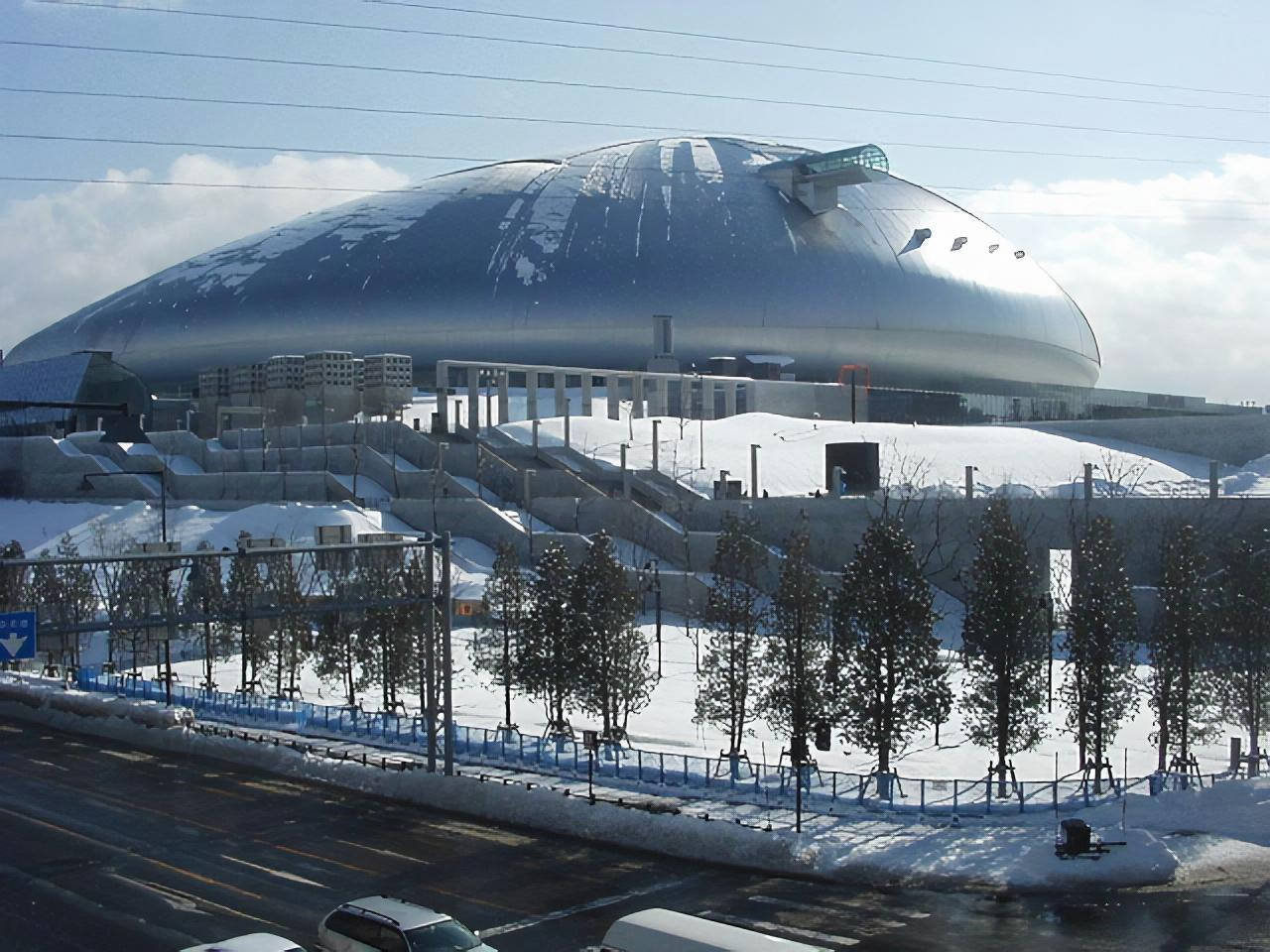
February 2004 picture of Sapporo Dome

- The ski jumping individual normal hill competition (and 15 km individual Gundersen) took place at Miyanomori (hill size (HS) of 100 m (HS100)) where the individual normal hill competition and the ski jumping competition of the Nordic combined at the 1972 Winter Olympics took place.
- The ski jumping individual and large hill competitions (and 7.5 km sprint and 4 x 5 km team) took place at Okurayama (HS of 134 m (HS134)) where the individual large hill competition of the 1972 Winter Olympics also took place.
- The Sapporo Dome hosted the opening ceremonies, individual and team cross-country sprint events, the cross-country portion of the 7.5 km Nordic combined sprint event, and the closing ceremonies of the championships. It marked the first time in the championship's history that a skiing event was held both indoors and in the evening.
- The remaining cross-country skiing events took place at the Shirahatayama cross-country course.

== Opening ceremony ==
The opening ceremony took place on 22 February 2007 at 19:30 Japan Standard Time (JST) (10:30 UTC) at the Sapporo Dome, with 23,602 spectators. Speeches were made by Fumio Ueda, Sapporo Mayor and Organizing Committee President, Ms. Yasuko Ikenobo, Deputy Minister of Education, Culture, Sports, Science and Technology, Ms. Harumi Takahashi, Governor of Hokkaido, and Prince Akishino. Then the men's and women's individual sprint cross-country skiing competitions took place.

== Attendance ==
Though the attendance on the first day of the championship, which included the opening ceremony, was nearly 30,000, the total attendance over the eleven days of the championships numbered around 90,000. Organizing Committee president Fumio Ueda admitted that the lack of good Japanese athletes – Japan only won one medal, a bronze in the ski jumping team large hill event, and the best individual finish came in the women's individual sprint with Madoka Natsumi's fifth-place finish – meant that the interest was low. FIS president Gian-Franco Kasper also said he had expected higher crowds, particularly in the cross-country skiing races on the Shirahatayama course. Several newspapers slated the low turnout in headlines: Norwegian Dagbladet called it a scandal, while Swedish Aftonbladet described it as a fiasco.

== Cross-country skiing ==
For more detailed information, please see the article Cross-country skiing at the FIS Nordic World Ski Championships 2007.

Medal table – men's cross-country skiing

Event	Date	Gold	Silver	Bronze
15 km freestyle interval start	28 February	Lars Berger (NOR)	Leanid Karneyenka (BLR)	Tobias Angerer (GER)
15 km + 15 km double pursuit	24 February	Axel Teichmann (GER)	Tobias Angerer (GER)	Pietro Piller Cottrer (ITA)
50 km classical mass start	4 March	Odd-Bjørn Hjelmeset (NOR)	Frode Estil (NOR)	Jens Filbrich (GER)
4 × 10 km relay	2 March	Eldar Rønning; Odd-Bjørn Hjelmeset; Lars Berger; Petter Northug; Norway	Nikolay Pankratov; Vasily Rochev; Alexander Legkov; Yevgeny Dementyev; Russia	Martin Larsson; Mathias Fredriksson; Marcus Hellner; Anders Södergren; Sweden
Individual sprint classical	22 February	Jens Arne Svartedal (NOR)	Mats Larsson (SWE)	Eldar Rønning (NOR)
Team sprint freestyle	23 February	Renato Pasini; Cristian Zorzi; Italy	Nikolay Morilov; Vasily Rochev; Russia	Milan Šperl; Dušan Kožíšek; Czech Republic

Medal table – women's cross-country skiing

Event	Date	Gold	Silver	Bronze
10 km freestyle interval start	27 February	Kateřina Neumannová (CZE)	Olga Zavyalova (RUS)	Arianna Follis (ITA)
7.5 km + 7.5 km double pursuit	25 February	Olga Zavyalova (RUS)	Kateřina Neumannová (CZE)	Kristin Størmer Steira (NOR)
30 km classical mass start	3 March	Virpi Kuitunen (FIN)	Kristin Størmer Steira (NOR)	Therese Johaug (NOR)
4 × 5 km relay	1 March	Virpi Kuitunen; Aino-Kaisa Saarinen; Riitta-Liisa Roponen; Pirjo Manninen; Finland	Stefanie Böhler; Viola Bauer; Claudia Künzel-Nystad; Evi Sachenbacher-Stehle; Germany	Vibeke Skofterud; Marit Bjørgen; Kristin Størmer Steira; Astrid Jacobsen; Norway
Individual sprint classical	22 February	Astrid Jacobsen (NOR)	Petra Majdič (SLO)	Virpi Kuitunen (FIN)
Team sprint freestyle	23 February	Riitta-Liisa Roponen; Virpi Kuitunen; Finland	Evi Sachenbacher-Stehle; Claudia Künzel-Nystad; Germany	Astrid Jacobsen; Marit Bjørgen; Norway

== Men's Nordic combined ==
For more detailed information, please see the article Nordic combined at the FIS Nordic World Ski Championships 2007.

Medal table

Event	Date	Gold	Silver	Bronze
7.5 km sprint	23 February	Hannu Manninen (FIN)	Magnus Moan (NOR)	Björn Kircheisen (GER)
15 km Individual Gundersen	3 March	Ronny Ackermann (GER)	Bill Demong (USA)	Anssi Koivuranta (FIN)
4 x 5 km freestyle team	25 February	Anssi Koivuranta; Janne Ryynänen; Jaakko Tallus; Hannu Manninen; Finland	Sebastian Haseney; Ronny Ackermann; Tino Edelmann; Björn Kircheisen; Germany	Håvard Klemetsen; Espen Rian; Petter Tande; Magnus Moan; Norway

== Men's ski jumping ==
For more detailed information, please see the article Ski jumping at the FIS Nordic World Ski Championships 2007.

Medal table

Event	Date	Gold	Silver	Bronze
Individual normal (HS100) hill	3 March	Adam Małysz (POL)	Simon Ammann (SUI)	Thomas Morgenstern (AUT)
Individual large (HS134) hill	24 February	Simon Ammann (SUI)	Harri Olli (FIN)	Roar Ljøkelsøy (NOR)
Team large (HS134) hill	25 February	Wolfgang Loitzl; Gregor Schlierenzauer; Andreas Kofler; Thomas Morgenstern; Austria	Tom Hilde; Anders Bardal; Anders Jacobsen; Roar Ljøkelsøy; Norway	Shohhei Tochimoto; Takanobu Okabe; Daiki Ito; Noriaki Kasai; Japan

== Doping controversy ==
On 21 February 2007, Sergey Shiryayev of Russia was involved in pre-competition testing for doping with a blood and urine sample. The blood sample in the "A-test" turned out high in hemoglobin, so the "B-test" was evaluated and confirmed to contain EPO. Shiryayev, who had his best finish of 11th in the 15 km event at the championships, was subsequently disqualified on 4 March 2007. FIS President Gian Franco Kasper expressed both disappointment in Shiriaev's doping actions and happiness in the efficiency of FIS's doping controls. At the FIS Council Meeting in May 2007 at Portorož, Slovenia, Shiryayev received a two-year ban from FIS competition (two Russian coaches were also sanctioned, by the Russian ski federation).

== Post-championship comments ==
FIS President Gian Franco Kasper expressed his thanks to the careful attention paid by FIS Vice-President (and Organizing Committee Chair) Yoshiro Ito over the detailed planning, arrangements, and execution of the championships, including television and Internet coverage. Kasper also expressed displeasure in the poor attendance of the events.

== Medal table ==
Medal winners by nation.

* Host nation (Japan)

Rank	Nation	Gold	Silver	Bronze	Total
1	Norway (NOR)	5	4	7	16
2	Finland (FIN)	5	1	2	8
3	Germany (GER)	2	4	3	9
4	Russia (RUS)	1	3	0	4
5	Czech Republic (CZE)	1	1	1	3
6	Switzerland (SUI)	1	1	0	2
7	Italy (ITA)	1	0	2	3
8	Austria (AUT)	1	0	1	2
9	Poland (POL)	1	0	0	1
10	Sweden (SWE)	0	1	1	2
11	Belarus (BLR)	0	1	0	1
11	Slovenia (SLO)	0	1	0	1
11	United States (USA)	0	1	0	1
14	Japan (JPN)*	0	0	1	1
Totals (14 entries)		18	18	18	54
