= List of teams and cyclists in the 2004 Giro d'Italia =

The 2004 Giro d'Italia was the 87th edition of the Giro d'Italia, one of cycling's Grand Tours. The field consisted of 169 riders, and 140 riders finished the race.

== By rider ==
Legend
No.	Starting number worn by the rider during the Giro
Pos.	Position in the general classification
DNF	Denotes a rider who did not finish

No.	Name	Nationality	Team	Pos.	Ref
1	Gilberto Simoni	Italy	Saeco	3	
2	Leonardo Bertagnolli	Italy	Saeco	37	
3	Damiano Cunego	Italy	Saeco	1	
4	Paolo Fornaciari	Italy	Saeco	100	
5	Eddy Mazzoleni	Italy	Saeco	21	
6	Alessandro Spezialetti	Italy	Saeco	66	
7	Gorazd Štangelj	Slovenia	Saeco	95	
8	Sylwester Szmyd	Poland	Saeco	43	
9	Andrea Tonti	Italy	Saeco	29	
11	Ruggero Marzoli	Italy	Acqua & Sapone	23	
12	Andrea Ferrigato	Italy	Acqua & Sapone	84	
13	Rinaldo Nocentini	Italy	Acqua & Sapone	34	
14	Bo Hamburger	Denmark	Acqua & Sapone	38	
15	Crescenzo D'Amore	Italy	Acqua & Sapone	123	
16	Fred Rodriguez	United States	Acqua & Sapone	99	
17	Kyrylo Pospyeyev	Ukraine	Acqua & Sapone	42	
18	Ondřej Sosenka	Czech Republic	Acqua & Sapone	DNF	
19	Gerhard Trampusch	Austria	Acqua & Sapone	26	
21	Magnus Bäckstedt	Sweden	Alessio–Bianchi	DNF	
22	Angelo Furlan	Italy	Alessio–Bianchi	128	
23	Alessandro Bertolini	Italy	Alessio–Bianchi	53	
24	Marcus Ljungqvist	Sweden	Alessio–Bianchi	63	
25	Vladimir Miholjević	Croatia	Alessio–Bianchi	24	
26	Cristian Moreni	Italy	Alessio–Bianchi	25	
27	Andrea Noè	Italy	Alessio–Bianchi	17	
28	Franco Pellizotti	Italy	Alessio–Bianchi	11	
29	Ellis Rastelli	Italy	Alessio–Bianchi	73	
31	Giuliano Figueras	Italy	Ceramica Panaria–Margres	DNF	
32	Julio Alberto Pérez	Mexico	Ceramica Panaria–Margres	33	
33	Scott Davis	Australia	Ceramica Panaria–Margres	90	
34	Brett Lancaster	Australia	Ceramica Panaria–Margres	124	
35	Paolo Lanfranchi	Italy	Ceramica Panaria–Margres	61	
36	Luca Mazzanti	Italy	Ceramica Panaria–Margres	46	
37	Emanuele Sella	Italy	Ceramica Panaria–Margres	12	
38	Fortunato Baliani	Italy	Ceramica Panaria–Margres	39	
39	Alejandro Borrajo	Argentina	Ceramica Panaria–Margres	79	
41	Andoni Aranaga	Spain	Chocolade Jacques–Wincor Nixdorf	DNF	
42	Mauricio Ardila	Colombia	Chocolade Jacques–Wincor Nixdorf	31	
43	Florent Brard	France	Chocolade Jacques–Wincor Nixdorf	108	
44	Denys Kostyuk	Ukraine	Chocolade Jacques–Wincor Nixdorf	60	
45	John Gadret	France	Chocolade Jacques–Wincor Nixdorf	DNF	
46	Maxim Rudenko	Ukraine	Chocolade Jacques–Wincor Nixdorf	133	
47	Jurgen Van de Walle	Belgium	Chocolade Jacques–Wincor Nixdorf	DNF	
48	Geert Verheyen	Belgium	Chocolade Jacques–Wincor Nixdorf	49	
49	Jan van Velzen	Netherlands	Chocolade Jacques–Wincor Nixdorf	122	
51	Fredy González	Colombia	Colombia–Selle Italia	DNF	
52	Marlon Pérez	Colombia	Colombia–Selle Italia	40	
53	Ruber Marín	Colombia	Colombia–Selle Italia	83	
55	Raffaele Illiano	Italy	Colombia–Selle Italia	35	
56	Leonardo Scarselli	Italy	Colombia–Selle Italia	DNF	
57	Philippe Schnyder	Switzerland	Colombia–Selle Italia	129	
58	Russell Van Hout	Australia	Colombia–Selle Italia	134	
59	Trent Wilson	Australia	Colombia–Selle Italia	126	
61	Serhiy Honchar	Ukraine	De Nardi–Piemme Telekom	2	
62	Ruggero Borghi	Italy	De Nardi–Piemme Telekom	28	
63	Simone Cadamuro	Italy	De Nardi–Piemme Telekom	120	
64	Graziano Gasparre	Italy	De Nardi–Piemme Telekom	78	
65	Leonardo Giordani	Italy	De Nardi–Piemme Telekom	75	
66	Michele Gobbi	Italy	De Nardi–Piemme Telekom	93	
67	Igor Pugaci	Moldova	De Nardi–Piemme Telekom	70	
68	Alessandro Vanotti	Italy	De Nardi–Piemme Telekom	44	
69	Charly Wegelius	Great Britain	De Nardi–Piemme Telekom	48	
71	Mario Cipollini	Italy	Domina Vacanze	DNF	
72	Andrus Aug	Estonia	Domina Vacanze	DNF	
73	Gabriele Colombo	Italy	Domina Vacanze	117	
74	Martin Derganc	Slovenia	Domina Vacanze	127	
75	Alessio Galletti	Italy	Domina Vacanze	89	
76	Massimo Iannetti	Italy	Domina Vacanze	DNF	
77	Giovanni Lombardi	Italy	Domina Vacanze	119	
78	Andris Naudužs	Latvia	Domina Vacanze	106	
79	Mario Scirea	Italy	Domina Vacanze	121	
81	Marzio Bruseghin	Italy	Fassa Bortolo	58	
82	Dario Cioni	Italy	Fassa Bortolo	4	
83	Massimo Codol	Italy	Fassa Bortolo	69	
84	Alberto Ongarato	Italy	Fassa Bortolo	109	
85	Alessandro Petacchi	Italy	Fassa Bortolo	97	
86	Fabio Sacchi	Italy	Fassa Bortolo	102	
87	Matteo Tosatto	Italy	Fassa Bortolo	107	
88	Volodymir Hustov	Ukraine	Fassa Bortolo	103	
89	Marco Velo	Italy	Fassa Bortolo	101	
91	Freddy Bichot	France	FDJeux.com	DNF	
92	David Derepas	France	FDJeux.com	85	
93	Nicolas Fritsch	France	FDJeux.com	51	
94	Philippe Gilbert	Belgium	FDJeux.com	32	
95	Bradley McGee	Australia	FDJeux.com	8	
96	Francis Mourey	France	FDJeux.com	104	
97	Benoît Vaugrenard	France	FDJeux.com	136	
98	Nicolas Vogondy	France	FDJeux.com	81	
99	Matthew Wilson	Australia	FDJeux.com	132	
101	Ivan Quaranta	Italy	Formaggi Pinzolo Fiavè	DNF	
102	Mario Manzoni	Italy	Formaggi Pinzolo Fiavè	135	
103	Boštjan Mervar	Slovenia	Formaggi Pinzolo Fiavè	130	
105	Domenico Gualdi	Italy	Formaggi Pinzolo Fiavè	139	
106	Giuseppe Di Grande	Italy	Formaggi Pinzolo Fiavè	20	
107	Giuseppe Muraglia	Italy	Formaggi Pinzolo Fiavè	57	
108	Luis Laverde	Colombia	Formaggi Pinzolo Fiavè	15	
109	Corrado Serina	Italy	Formaggi Pinzolo Fiavè	140	
111	Gianni Faresin	Italy	Gerolsteiner	DNF	
112	Robert Förster	Germany	Gerolsteiner	116	
113	Sven Montgomery	Switzerland	Gerolsteiner	DNF	
114	Olaf Pollack	Germany	Gerolsteiner	112	
115	Davide Rebellin	Italy	Gerolsteiner	DNF	
116	Marco Serpellini	Italy	Gerolsteiner	71	
117	Marcel Strauss	Switzerland	Gerolsteiner	105	
118	Fabian Wegmann	Germany	Gerolsteiner	36	
119	Thomas Ziegler	Germany	Gerolsteiner	64	
121	Juan Manuel Gárate	Spain	Lampre	10	
122	Wladimir Belli	Italy	Lampre	7	
123	Igor Astarloa	Spain	Lampre	56	
124	Ján Svorada	Czech Republic	Lampre	DNF	
125	Andrej Hauptman	Slovenia	Lampre	82	
126	Luciano Pagliarini	Brazil	Lampre	DNF	
127	Mariano Piccoli	Italy	Lampre	59	
128	Daniele Righi	Italy	Lampre	96	
129	Francisco Vila	Spain	Lampre	22	
131	Volodymyr Bileka	Ukraine	Landbouwkrediet–Colnago	50	
132	Vladimir Duma	Ukraine	Landbouwkrediet–Colnago	65	
133	Jacky Durand	France	Landbouwkrediet–Colnago	DNF	
134	Cristian Gasperoni	Italy	Landbouwkrediet–Colnago	DNF	
135	Yaroslav Popovych	Ukraine	Landbouwkrediet–Colnago	5	
136	Nico Sijmens	Belgium	Landbouwkrediet–Colnago	68	
137	Tomas Vaitkus	Lithuania	Landbouwkrediet–Colnago	DNF	
138	Johan Verstrepen	Belgium	Landbouwkrediet–Colnago	94	
139	Sergey Advejev	Ukraine	Landbouwkrediet–Colnago	86	
141	Robbie McEwen	Australia	Lotto–Domo	DNF	
142	Christophe Brandt	Belgium	Lotto–Domo	14	
143	Gorik Gardeyn	Belgium	Lotto–Domo	125	
144	Piotr Wadecki	Poland	Lotto–Domo	DNF	
145	Aart Vierhouten	Netherlands	Lotto–Domo	110	
146	Christophe Detilloux	Belgium	Lotto–Domo	DNF	
147	Nick Gates	Australia	Lotto–Domo	113	
148	Gert Steegmans	Belgium	Lotto–Domo	131	
149	Ief Verbrugghe	Belgium	Lotto–Domo	115	
151	Michael Albasini	Switzerland	Phonak	88	
152	Niki Aebersold	Switzerland	Phonak	41	
153	Daniele Bennati	Italy	Phonak	DNF	
154	Marco Fertonani	Italy	Phonak	55	
155	Alexandre Moos	Switzerland	Phonak	27	
156	Uroš Murn	Slovenia	Phonak	92	
157	Daniel Schnider	Switzerland	Phonak	45	
158	Alexandre Usov	Belarus	Phonak	98	
159	Tadej Valjavec	Slovenia	Phonak	9	
161	Rubens Bertogliati	Switzerland	Saunier Duval–Prodir	52	
162	David Cañada	Spain	Saunier Duval–Prodir	18	
163	Juan Carlos Domínguez	Spain	Saunier Duval–Prodir	DNF	
164	Juan Gomis Lopez	Spain	Saunier Duval–Prodir	67	
165	Rubén Lobato	Spain	Saunier Duval–Prodir	16	
166	Alberto Loddo	Italy	Saunier Duval–Prodir	DNF	
167	Manuele Mori	Italy	Saunier Duval–Prodir	76	
168	Oliver Zaugg	Switzerland	Saunier Duval–Prodir	47	
169	Massimo Strazzer	Italy	Saunier Duval–Prodir	DNF	
171	Gabriele Bosisio	Italy	Tenax	137	
172	Giancarlo Ginestri	Italy	Tenax	118	
173	Zoran Klemenčič	Slovenia	Tenax	DNF	
174	Nicola Loda	Italy	Tenax	74	
175	Renzo Mazzoleni	Italy	Tenax	111	
176	Daniele Pietropolli	Italy	Tenax	80	
177	Dean Podgornik	Slovenia	Tenax	138	
178	Oscar Pozzi	Italy	Tenax	72	
179	Radoslav Rogina	Croatia	Tenax	87	
181	Stefano Garzelli	Italy	Vini Caldirola–Nobili Rubinetterie	6	
182	Pavel Tonkov	Russia	Vini Caldirola–Nobili Rubinetterie	13	
183	Dario Andriotto	Italy	Vini Caldirola–Nobili Rubinetterie	54	
184	Mauro Gerosa	Italy	Vini Caldirola–Nobili Rubinetterie	62	
185	Simone Masciarelli	Italy	Vini Caldirola–Nobili Rubinetterie	91	
186	Oscar Mason	Italy	Vini Caldirola–Nobili Rubinetterie	30	
187	Gianluca Sironi	Italy	Vini Caldirola–Nobili Rubinetterie	77	
188	Steve Zampieri	Switzerland	Vini Caldirola–Nobili Rubinetterie	19	
189	Marco Zanotti	Italy	Vini Caldirola–Nobili Rubinetterie	114	
