= 2004 Giro d'Italia, Prologue to Stage 10 =

Cycling race stages

The 2004 Giro d'Italia was the 87th edition of the Giro d'Italia, one of cycling's Grand Tours. The Giro began in Genoa, with a Prologue individual time trial on 8 May, and Stage 10 occurred on 19 May with a stage to Ascoli Piceno. The race finished in Milan on 30 May.

== Prologue ==
8 May 2004 — Genoa, 6.9 km (4.3 mi) (ITT)

Prologue result and general classification after Prologue

Rank	Rider	Team	Time
1	Bradley McGee (AUS)	FDJeux.com	8' 30"
2	Olaf Pollack (GER)	Gerolsteiner	+ 10"
3	Yaroslav Popovych (UKR)	Landbouwkrediet–Colnago	+ 20"
4	Gerhard Trampusch (AUT)	Acqua & Sapone	+ 24"
5	Davide Rebellin (ITA)	Gerolsteiner	+ 27"
6	Marzio Bruseghin (ITA)	Fassa Bortolo	+ 30"
7	Marco Velo (ITA)	Fassa Bortolo	+ 32"
8	Magnus Bäckstedt (SWE)	Alessio–Bianchi	s.t.
9	Dario Cioni (ITA)	Fassa Bortolo	+ 33"
10	Juan Carlos Domínguez (ESP)	Saunier Duval–Prodir	+ 34"

== Stage 1 ==
9 May 2004 — Genoa to Alba, 143 km (89 mi)

Stage 1 Result

Rank	Rider	Team	Time
1	Alessandro Petacchi (ITA)	Fassa Bortolo	3h 41' 56"
2	Olaf Pollack (GER)	Gerolsteiner	s.t.
3	Crescenzo D'Amore (ITA)	Acqua & Sapone	s.t.
4	Robbie McEwen (AUS)	Lotto–Domo	s.t.
5	Marco Zanotti (ITA)	Vini Caldirola–Nobili Rubinetterie	s.t.
6	Philippe Gilbert (BEL)	FDJeux.com	s.t.
7	Ján Svorada (CZE)	Lampre	s.t.
8	Luciano Pagliarini (BRA)	Lampre	s.t.
9	David Derepas (FRA)	FDJeux.com	s.t.
10	Alexandre Usov (BLR)	Phonak	s.t.

General classification after Stage 1

Rank	Rider	Team	Time
1	Olaf Pollack (GER)	Gerolsteiner	3h 50' 24"
2	Bradley McGee (AUS)	FDJeux.com	+ 2"
3	Alessandro Petacchi (ITA)	Fassa Bortolo	+ 20"
4	Yaroslav Popovych (UKR)	Landbouwkrediet–Colnago	+ 22"
5	Gerhard Trampusch (AUT)	Acqua & Sapone	+ 26"
6	Crescenzo D'Amore (ITA)	Acqua & Sapone	+ 32"
7	Marco Velo (ITA)	Fassa Bortolo	+ 34"
8	Dario Cioni (ITA)	Fassa Bortolo	+ 35"
9	Mario Cipollini (ITA)	De Nardi–Piemme Telekom	+ 37"
10	Davide Rebellin (ITA)	Gerolsteiner	s.t.

== Stage 2 ==
10 May 2004 — Novi Ligure to Pontremoli, 184 km (114 mi)

Stage 2 Result

Rank	Rider	Team	Time
1	Damiano Cunego (ITA)	Saeco	4h 37' 08"
2	Bradley McGee (AUS)	FDJeux.com	s.t.
3	Cristian Moreni (ITA)	Alessio–Bianchi	s.t.
4	Igor Astarloa (ESP)	Lampre	s.t.
5	Eddy Mazzoleni (ITA)	Saeco	s.t.
6	Gerhard Trampusch (AUT)	Acqua & Sapone	s.t.
7	Davide Rebellin (ITA)	Gerolsteiner	s.t.
8	Stefano Garzelli (ITA)	Vini Caldirola–Nobili Rubinetterie	s.t.
9	Giuseppe Di Grande (ITA)	Formaggi Pinzolo Fiavè	s.t.
10	Yaroslav Popovych (UKR)	Landbouwkrediet–Colnago	s.t.

General classification after Stage 2

Rank	Rider	Team	Time
1	Bradley McGee (AUS)	FDJeux.com	8h 27' 22"
2	Yaroslav Popovych (UKR)	Landbouwkrediet–Colnago	+ 32"
3	Gerhard Trampusch (AUT)	Acqua & Sapone	+ 36"
4	Damiano Cunego (ITA)	Saeco	+ 37"
5	Cristian Moreni (ITA)	Alessio–Bianchi	+ 39"
6	Dario Cioni (ITA)	Fassa Bortolo	+ 45"
7	Davide Rebellin (ITA)	Gerolsteiner	+ 47"
8	Kyrylo Pospyeyev (UKR)	Acqua & Sapone	s.t.
9	Gilberto Simoni (ITA)	Saeco	s.t.
10	Franco Pellizotti (ITA)	Alessio–Bianchi	+ 48"

== Stage 3 ==
11 May 2004 — Pontremoli to Corno alle Scale, 191 km (119 mi)

Stage 3 Result

Rank	Rider	Team	Time
1	Gilberto Simoni (ITA)	Saeco	5h 46' 09"
2	Damiano Cunego (ITA)	Saeco	+ 15"
3	Franco Pellizotti (ITA)	Alessio–Bianchi	+ 16"
4	Giuliano Figueras (ITA)	Ceramica Panaria–Margres	s.t.
5	Yaroslav Popovych (UKR)	Landbouwkrediet–Colnago	s.t.
6	Eddy Mazzoleni (ITA)	Saeco	+ 32"
7	Gerhard Trampusch (AUT)	Acqua & Sapone	s.t.
8	Stefano Garzelli (ITA)	Vini Caldirola–Nobili Rubinetterie	+ 34"
9	Dario Cioni (ITA)	Fassa Bortolo	s.t.
10	Andrea Noè (ITA)	Alessio–Bianchi	s.t.

General classification after Stage 3

Rank	Rider	Team	Time
1	Gilberto Simoni (ITA)	Saeco	14h 13' 58"
2	Damiano Cunego (ITA)	Saeco	+ 13"
3	Yaroslav Popovych (UKR)	Landbouwkrediet–Colnago	+ 21"
4	Franco Pellizotti (ITA)	Alessio–Bianchi	+ 29"
5	Gerhard Trampusch (AUT)	Acqua & Sapone	+ 41"
6	Giuliano Figueras (ITA)	Ceramica Panaria–Margres	+ 45"
7	Dario Cioni (ITA)	Fassa Bortolo	+ 52"
8	Serhiy Honchar (UKR)	De Nardi	+ 58"
9	Stefano Garzelli (ITA)	Vini Caldirola–Nobili Rubinetterie	+ 1' 05"
10	Eddy Mazzoleni (ITA)	Saeco	s.t.

== Stage 4 ==
12 May 2004 — Porretta Terme to Civitella in Val di Chiana, 184 km (114 mi)

Stage 4 Result

Rank	Rider	Team	Time
1	Alessandro Petacchi (ITA)	Fassa Bortolo	4h 55' 40"
2	Robbie McEwen (AUS)	Lotto–Domo	s.t.
3	Simone Cadamuro (ITA)	De Nardi	s.t.
4	Marco Zanotti (ITA)	Vini Caldirola–Nobili Rubinetterie	s.t.
5	Fred Rodriguez (USA)	Acqua & Sapone	s.t.
6	Massimo Strazzer (ITA)	Saunier Duval–Prodir	s.t.
7	Magnus Bäckstedt (SWE)	Alessio–Bianchi	s.t.
8	Alexandre Usov (BLR)	Phonak	s.t.
9	Alejandro Borrajo (ARG)	Ceramica Panaria–Margres	s.t.
10	Graziano Gasparre (ITA)	De Nardi	s.t.

General classification after Stage 4

Rank	Rider	Team	Time
1	Gilberto Simoni (ITA)	Saeco	19h 09' 38"
2	Damiano Cunego (ITA)	Saeco	+ 13"
3	Yaroslav Popovych (UKR)	Landbouwkrediet–Colnago	+ 21"
4	Franco Pellizotti (ITA)	Alessio–Bianchi	+ 29"
5	Gerhard Trampusch (AUT)	Acqua & Sapone	+ 41"
6	Giuliano Figueras (ITA)	Ceramica Panaria–Margres	+ 45"
7	Dario Cioni (ITA)	Fassa Bortolo	+ 52"
8	Serhiy Honchar (UKR)	De Nardi	+ 58"
9	Stefano Garzelli (ITA)	Vini Caldirola–Nobili Rubinetterie	+ 1' 05"
10	Eddy Mazzoleni (ITA)	Saeco	+ 1' 06"

== Stage 5 ==
13 May 2004 — Civitella in Val di Chiana to Spoleto, 177 km (110 mi)

Stage 5 Result

Rank	Rider	Team	Time
1	Robbie McEwen (AUS)	Lotto–Domo	4h 24' 57"
2	Olaf Pollack (GER)	Gerolsteiner	s.t.
3	Marco Zanotti (ITA)	Vini Caldirola–Nobili Rubinetterie	s.t.
4	Alexandre Usov (BLR)	Phonak	s.t.
5	Crescenzo D'Amore (ITA)	Acqua & Sapone	s.t.
6	Eddy Mazzoleni (ITA)	Saeco	s.t.
7	Andris Naudužs (LAT)	De Nardi–Piemme Telekom	s.t.
8	Simone Cadamuro (ITA)	De Nardi	s.t.
9	Fred Rodriguez (USA)	Acqua & Sapone	s.t.
10	Alejandro Borrajo (ARG)	Ceramica Panaria–Margres	s.t.

General classification after Stage 5

Rank	Rider	Team	Time
1	Gilberto Simoni (ITA)	Saeco	23h 34' 35"
2	Damiano Cunego (ITA)	Saeco	+ 13"
3	Yaroslav Popovych (UKR)	Landbouwkrediet–Colnago	+ 21"
4	Franco Pellizotti (ITA)	Alessio–Bianchi	+ 29"
5	Gerhard Trampusch (AUT)	Acqua & Sapone	+ 41"
6	Giuliano Figueras (ITA)	Ceramica Panaria–Margres	+ 45"
7	Dario Cioni (ITA)	Fassa Bortolo	+ 52"
8	Serhiy Honchar (UKR)	De Nardi	+ 58"
9	Stefano Garzelli (ITA)	Vini Caldirola–Nobili Rubinetterie	+ 1' 05"
10	Eddy Mazzoleni (ITA)	Saeco	+ 1' 06"

== Stage 6 ==
14 May 2004 — Spoleto to Valmontone, 164 km (102 mi)

Stage 6 Result

Rank	Rider	Team	Time
1	Alessandro Petacchi (ITA)	Fassa Bortolo	4h 00' 55"
2	Olaf Pollack (GER)	Gerolsteiner	s.t.
3	Alejandro Borrajo (ARG)	Ceramica Panaria–Margres	s.t.
4	Eddy Mazzoleni (ITA)	Saeco	s.t.
5	Andris Naudužs (LAT)	De Nardi–Piemme Telekom	s.t.
6	Fred Rodriguez (USA)	Acqua & Sapone	s.t.
7	Andrus Aug (EST)	De Nardi–Piemme Telekom	s.t.
8	Alexandre Usov (BLR)	Phonak	s.t.
9	Robbie McEwen (AUS)	Lotto–Domo	s.t.
10	Michael Albasini (SUI)	Phonak	s.t.

General classification after Stage 6

Rank	Rider	Team	Time
1	Gilberto Simoni (ITA)	Saeco	27h 35' 30"
2	Damiano Cunego (ITA)	Saeco	+ 13"
3	Yaroslav Popovych (UKR)	Landbouwkrediet–Colnago	+ 21"
4	Franco Pellizotti (ITA)	Alessio–Bianchi	+ 29"
5	Gerhard Trampusch (AUT)	Acqua & Sapone	+ 41"
6	Giuliano Figueras (ITA)	Ceramica Panaria–Margres	+ 45"
7	Dario Cioni (ITA)	Fassa Bortolo	+ 52"
8	Serhiy Honchar (UKR)	De Nardi	+ 58"
9	Stefano Garzelli (ITA)	Vini Caldirola–Nobili Rubinetterie	+ 1' 05"
10	Eddy Mazzoleni (ITA)	Saeco	+ 1' 06"

== Stage 7 ==
15 May 2004 — Frosinone to Montevergine di Mercogliano, 214 km (133 mi)

Stage 7 Result

Rank	Rider	Team	Time
1	Damiano Cunego (ITA)	Saeco	5h 26' 25"
2	Bradley McGee (AUS)	FDJeux.com	s.t.
3	Franco Pellizotti (ITA)	Alessio–Bianchi	s.t.
4	Giuliano Figueras (ITA)	Ceramica Panaria–Margres	s.t.
5	Stefano Garzelli (ITA)	Vini Caldirola–Nobili Rubinetterie	+ 3"
6	Gilberto Simoni (ITA)	Saeco	s.t.
7	Serhiy Honchar (UKR)	De Nardi	s.t.
8	Andrea Noè (ITA)	Alessio–Bianchi	s.t.
9	Wladimir Belli (ITA)	Lampre	s.t.
10	Yaroslav Popovych (UKR)	Landbouwkrediet–Colnago	s.t.

General classification after Stage 7

Rank	Rider	Team	Time
1	Damiano Cunego (ITA)	Saeco	33h 01' 48"
2	Gilberto Simoni (ITA)	Saeco	+ 10"
3	Franco Pellizotti (ITA)	Alessio–Bianchi	+ 28"
4	Yaroslav Popovych (UKR)	Landbouwkrediet–Colnago	+ 31"
5	Giuliano Figueras (ITA)	Ceramica Panaria–Margres	+ 52"
6	Serhiy Honchar (UKR)	De Nardi	+ 1' 08"
7	Dario Cioni (ITA)	Fassa Bortolo	+ 1' 10"
8	Stefano Garzelli (ITA)	Vini Caldirola–Nobili Rubinetterie	+ 1' 15"
9	Andrea Noè (ITA)	Alessio–Bianchi	+ 1' 17"
10	Eddy Mazzoleni (ITA)	Saeco	+ 1' 25"

== Stage 8 ==
16 May 2004 — Giffoni Valle Piana to Policoro, 214 km (133 mi)

Stage 8 Result

Rank	Rider	Team	Time
1	Alessandro Petacchi (ITA)	Fassa Bortolo	4h 52' 49"
2	Tomas Vaitkus (LTU)	Landbouwkrediet–Colnago	s.t.
3	Olaf Pollack (GER)	Gerolsteiner	s.t.
4	Marco Zanotti (ITA)	Vini Caldirola–Nobili Rubinetterie	s.t.
5	Ján Svorada (CZE)	Lampre	s.t.
6	Alexandre Usov (BLR)	Phonak	s.t.
7	Zoran Klemenčič (SLO)	Tenax	s.t.
8	Alejandro Borrajo (ARG)	Ceramica Panaria–Margres	s.t.
9	Alberto Loddo (ITA)	Saunier Duval–Prodir	s.t.
10	Robert Förster (GER)	Gerolsteiner	s.t.

General classification after Stage 8

Rank	Rider	Team	Time
1	Damiano Cunego (ITA)	Saeco	37h 54' 37"
2	Gilberto Simoni (ITA)	Saeco	+ 10"
3	Franco Pellizotti (ITA)	Alessio–Bianchi	+ 28"
4	Yaroslav Popovych (UKR)	Landbouwkrediet–Colnago	+ 31"
5	Giuliano Figueras (ITA)	Ceramica Panaria–Margres	+ 52"
6	Serhiy Honchar (UKR)	De Nardi	+ 1' 08"
7	Dario Cioni (ITA)	Fassa Bortolo	+ 1' 10"
8	Stefano Garzelli (ITA)	Vini Caldirola–Nobili Rubinetterie	+ 1' 15"
9	Andrea Noè (ITA)	Alessio–Bianchi	+ 1' 17"
10	Eddy Mazzoleni (ITA)	Saeco	+ 1' 25"

== Stage 9 ==
17 May 2004 — Policoro to Carovigno, 142 km (88 mi)

Stage 9 Result

Rank	Rider	Team	Time
1	Fred Rodriguez (USA)	Acqua & Sapone	4h 04' 38"
2	Alessandro Petacchi (ITA)	Fassa Bortolo	s.t.
3	Angelo Furlan (ITA)	Alessio–Bianchi	s.t.
4	Robbie McEwen (AUS)	Lotto–Domo	s.t.
5	Ján Svorada (CZE)	Lampre	s.t.
6	Andris Naudužs (LAT)	De Nardi–Piemme Telekom	s.t.
7	Marco Zanotti (ITA)	Vini Caldirola–Nobili Rubinetterie	s.t.
8	Robert Förster (GER)	Gerolsteiner	s.t.
9	Simone Cadamuro (ITA)	De Nardi	s.t.
10	Alexandre Usov (BLR)	Phonak	s.t.

General classification after Stage 9

Rank	Rider	Team	Time
1	Damiano Cunego (ITA)	Saeco	41h 59' 15"
2	Gilberto Simoni (ITA)	Saeco	+ 10"
3	Franco Pellizotti (ITA)	Alessio–Bianchi	+ 28"
4	Yaroslav Popovych (UKR)	Landbouwkrediet–Colnago	+ 31"
5	Giuliano Figueras (ITA)	Ceramica Panaria–Margres	+ 52"
6	Serhiy Honchar (UKR)	De Nardi	+ 1' 08"
7	Dario Cioni (ITA)	Fassa Bortolo	+ 1' 10"
8	Stefano Garzelli (ITA)	Vini Caldirola–Nobili Rubinetterie	+ 1' 15"
9	Andrea Noè (ITA)	Alessio–Bianchi	+ 1' 17"
10	Eddy Mazzoleni (ITA)	Saeco	+ 1' 25"

== Rest day 1 ==
18 May 2004

== Stage 10 ==
19 May 2004 — Porto Sant'Elpidio to Ascoli Piceno, 146 km (91 mi)

Stage 10 Result

Rank	Rider	Team	Time
1	Alessandro Petacchi (ITA)	Fassa Bortolo	3h 24' 17"
2	Marco Zanotti (ITA)	Vini Caldirola–Nobili Rubinetterie	s.t.
3	Andris Naudužs (LAT)	De Nardi–Piemme Telekom	s.t.
4	Magnus Bäckstedt (SWE)	Alessio–Bianchi	s.t.
5	Alejandro Borrajo (ARG)	Ceramica Panaria–Margres	s.t.
6	Ján Svorada (CZE)	Lampre	s.t.
7	Alexandre Usov (BLR)	Phonak	s.t.
8	Olaf Pollack (GER)	Gerolsteiner	s.t.
9	Simone Cadamuro (ITA)	De Nardi	s.t.
10	Manuele Mori (ITA)	Saunier Duval–Prodir	s.t.

General classification after Stage 10

Rank	Rider	Team	Time
1	Damiano Cunego (ITA)	Saeco	45h 23' 32"
2	Gilberto Simoni (ITA)	Saeco	+ 10"
3	Franco Pellizotti (ITA)	Alessio–Bianchi	+ 28"
4	Yaroslav Popovych (UKR)	Landbouwkrediet–Colnago	+ 40"
5	Giuliano Figueras (ITA)	Ceramica Panaria–Margres	+ 52"
6	Stefano Garzelli (ITA)	Vini Caldirola–Nobili Rubinetterie	+ 1' 15"
7	Andrea Noè (ITA)	Alessio–Bianchi	+ 1' 17"
8	Serhiy Honchar (UKR)	De Nardi	s.t.
9	Dario Cioni (ITA)	Fassa Bortolo	+ 1' 19"
10	Eddy Mazzoleni (ITA)	Saeco	+ 1' 29"
