= 2003 Giro d'Italia, Stage 1 to Stage 11 =

Cycling race stages

The 2003 Giro d'Italia was the 86th edition of the Giro d'Italia, one of cycling's Grand Tours. The Giro began in Lecce, with a flat stage on 10 May, and Stage 11 occurred on 21 May with a stage to San Donà di Piave. The race finished in Milan on 1 June.

== Stage 1 ==
10 May 2003 — Lecce to Lecce, 201 km (125 mi)

Stage 1 result

Rank	Rider	Team	Time
1	Alessandro Petacchi (ITA)	Fassa Bortolo	5h 16' 03"
2	Mario Cipollini (ITA)	De Nardi–Colpack	s.t.
3	Angelo Furlan (ITA)	Alessio	s.t.
4	Isaac Gálvez (ESP)	Kelme–Costa Blanca	s.t.
5	Robbie McEwen (AUS)	Lotto–Domo	s.t.
6	Graeme Brown (AUS)	Ceramiche Panaria–Fiordo	s.t.
7	Jimmy Casper (FRA)	FDJeux.com	s.t.
8	Dario Pieri (ITA)	Saeco	s.t.
9	Ján Svorada (CZE)	Lampre	s.t.
10	Graziano Gasparre (ITA)	De Nardi-Colpack	s.t.

General classification after Stage 1

Rank	Rider	Team	Time
1	Alessandro Petacchi (ITA)	Fassa Bortolo	5h 15' 43"
2	Mario Cipollini (ITA)	De Nardi–Colpack	+ 8"
3	Angelo Furlan (ITA)	Alessio	+ 12"
4	Andris Naudužs (LAT)	CCC–Polsat	+ 14"
5	Mariano Piccoli (ITA)	Lampre	+ 16"
6	Isaac Gálvez (ESP)	Kelme–Costa Blanca	+ 20"
7	Robbie McEwen (AUS)	Lotto–Domo	s.t.
8	Graeme Brown (AUS)	Ceramiche Panaria–Fiordo	s.t.
9	Jimmy Casper (FRA)	FDJeux.com	s.t.
10	Dario Pieri (ITA)	Saeco	s.t.

== Stage 2 ==
11 May 2003 — Copertino to Matera, 177 km (110 mi)

Stage 2 Result

Rank	Rider	Team	Time
1	Fabio Baldato (ITA)	Alessio	4h 46' 57"
2	Gabriele Colombo (ITA)	De Nardi–Colpack	s.t.
3	Giuliano Figueras (ITA)	Ceramiche Panaria–Fiordo	s.t.
4	Alessandro Petacchi (ITA)	Fassa Bortolo	s.t.
5	Bernhard Eisel (AUT)	FDJeux.com	s.t.
6	Vladimir Duma (UKR)	Landbouwkrediet–Colnago	s.t.
7	Stefano Garzelli (ITA)	Vini Caldirola–So.di	s.t.
8	Francesco Casagrande (ITA)	Lampre	s.t.
9	Fabio Sacchi (ITA)	Saeco	s.t.
10	Bo Hamburger (DEN)	Formaggi Pinzolo Fiavè	s.t.

General classification after Stage 2

Rank	Rider	Team	Time
1	Alessandro Petacchi (ITA)	Fassa Bortolo	10h 02' 36"
2	Fabio Baldato (ITA)	Alessio	+ 4"
3	Gabriele Colombo (ITA)	De Nardi–Colpack	+ 19"
4	Giuliano Figueras (ITA)	Ceramiche Panaria–Fiordo	+ 23"
5	Graziano Gasparre (ITA)	De Nardi-Colpack	+ 24"
6	Fabio Sacchi (ITA)	Saeco	s.t.
7	Denis Lunghi (ITA)	Alessio	s.t.
8	Kurt Asle Arvesen (NOR)	Team Fakta	s.t.
9	Franco Pellizotti (ITA)	Alessio	s.t.
10	Aitor González (ESP)	Fassa Bortolo	s.t.

== Stage 3 ==
12 May 2003 — Policoro to Terme Luigiane, 145 km (90 mi)

Stage 3 Result

Rank	Rider	Team	Time
1	Stefano Garzelli (ITA)	Vini Caldirola–So.di	3h 34' 38"
2	Francesco Casagrande (ITA)	Lampre	+ 2"
3	Alessandro Petacchi (ITA)	Fassa Bortolo	s.t.
4	Franco Pellizotti (ITA)	Alessio	s.t.
5	Gabriele Colombo (ITA)	De Nardi–Colpack	s.t.
6	Paolo Lanfranchi (ITA)	Ceramiche Panaria–Fiordo	s.t.
7	Gilberto Simoni (ITA)	Saeco	s.t.
8	Serhiy Honchar (UKR)	De Nardi-Colpack	s.t.
9	Andrea Noè (ITA)	Alessio	s.t.
10	Graziano Gasparre (ITA)	De Nardi-Colpack	s.t.

General classification after Stage 3

Rank	Rider	Team	Time
1	Alessandro Petacchi (ITA)	Fassa Bortolo	13h 37' 08"
2	Stefano Garzelli (ITA)	Vini Caldirola–So.di	+ 17"
3	Francesco Casagrande (ITA)	Lampre	+ 27"
4	Gabriele Colombo (ITA)	De Nardi–Colpack	s.t.
5	Graziano Gasparre (ITA)	De Nardi-Colpack	+ 32"
6	Franco Pellizotti (ITA)	Alessio	s.t.
7	Gilberto Simoni (ITA)	Saeco	s.t.
8	Denis Lunghi (ITA)	Alessio	+ 39"
9	Andrea Noè (ITA)	Alessio	s.t.
10	Bo Hamburger (DEN)	Formaggi Pinzolo Fiavè	s.t.

== Stage 4 ==
13 May 2003 — Terme Luigiane to Vibo Valentia, 170 km (110 mi)

Stage 4 Result

Rank	Rider	Team	Time
1	Robbie McEwen (AUS)	Lotto–Domo	4h 00' 25"
2	Alessandro Petacchi (ITA)	Fassa Bortolo	s.t.
3	Bernhard Eisel (AUT)	FDJeux.com	s.t.
4	Giovanni Lombardi (ITA)	De Nardi–Colpack	s.t.
5	Magnus Bäckstedt (SWE)	Team Fakta	s.t.
6	Isaac Gálvez (ESP)	Kelme–Costa Blanca	s.t.
7	Graziano Gasparre (ITA)	De Nardi-Colpack	s.t.
8	Vladimir Duma (UKR)	Landbouwkrediet–Colnago	s.t.
9	Marco Pantani (ITA)	Mercatone Uno–Scanavino	s.t.
10	Denis Lunghi (ITA)	Alessio	s.t.

General classification after Stage 4

Rank	Rider	Team	Time
1	Alessandro Petacchi (ITA)	Fassa Bortolo	17h 37' 21"
2	Stefano Garzelli (ITA)	Vini Caldirola–So.di	+ 29"
3	Francesco Casagrande (ITA)	Lampre	+ 39"
4	Graziano Gasparre (ITA)	De Nardi-Colpack	+ 44"
5	Franco Pellizotti (ITA)	Alessio	s.t.
6	Gilberto Simoni (ITA)	Saeco	s.t.
7	Denis Lunghi (ITA)	Alessio	+ 51"
8	Bo Hamburger (DEN)	Formaggi Pinzolo Fiavè	s.t.
9	Andrea Noè (ITA)	Alessio	s.t.
10	Aitor González (ESP)	Fassa Bortolo	s.t.

== Stage 5 ==
14 May 2003 — Messina to Catania, 176 km (109 mi)

Stage 5 Result

Rank	Rider	Team	Time
1	Alessandro Petacchi (ITA)	Fassa Bortolo	4h 54' 43"
2	Mario Cipollini (ITA)	De Nardi–Colpack	s.t.
3	Bernhard Eisel (AUT)	FDJeux.com	s.t.
4	Cristian Moreni (ITA)	Alessio	s.t.
5	Robbie McEwen (AUS)	Lotto–Domo	s.t.
6	Graeme Brown (AUS)	Ceramiche Panaria–Fiordo	s.t.
7	Ján Svorada (CZE)	Lampre	s.t.
8	Dario Pieri (ITA)	Saeco	s.t.
9	Gabriele Balducci (ITA)	Vini Caldirola–So.di	s.t.
10	Vladimir Duma (UKR)	Landbouwkrediet–Colnago	s.t.

General classification after Stage 5

Rank	Rider	Team	Time
1	Alessandro Petacchi (ITA)	Fassa Bortolo	22h 31' 44"
2	Stefano Garzelli (ITA)	Vini Caldirola–So.di	+ 49"
3	Francesco Casagrande (ITA)	Lampre	+ 59"
4	Franco Pellizotti (ITA)	Alessio	+ 1' 04"
5	Gilberto Simoni (ITA)	Saeco	s.t.
6	Denis Lunghi (ITA)	Alessio	+ 1' 11"
7	Bo Hamburger (DEN)	Formaggi Pinzolo Fiavè	s.t.
8	Andrea Noè (ITA)	Alessio	s.t.
9	Marius Sabaliauskas (LTU)	Saeco	s.t.
10	Michele Scarponi (ITA)	De Nardi–Colpack	s.t.

== Rest day 1 ==
15 May 2003

== Stage 6 ==
16 May 2003 — Maddaloni to Avezzano, 222 km (138 mi)

Stage 6 Result

Rank	Rider	Team	Time
1	Alessandro Petacchi (ITA)	Fassa Bortolo	5h 11' 52"
2	Isaac Gálvez (ESP)	Kelme–Costa Blanca	s.t.
3	Ján Svorada (CZE)	Lampre	s.t.
4	Marco Velo (ITA)	Fassa Bortolo	s.t.
5	Stefano Garzelli (ITA)	Vini Caldirola–So.di	s.t.
6	Mario Cipollini (ITA)	De Nardi–Colpack	s.t.
7	Giovanni Lombardi (ITA)	De Nardi–Colpack	s.t.
8	Graziano Gasparre (ITA)	De Nardi-Colpack	+ 3"
9	Graeme Brown (AUS)	Ceramiche Panaria–Fiordo	s.t.
10	Daniele Bennati (ITA)	De Nardi–Colpack	s.t.

General classification after Stage 6

Rank	Rider	Team	Time
1	Alessandro Petacchi (ITA)	Fassa Bortolo	27h 43' 16"
2	Stefano Garzelli (ITA)	Vini Caldirola–So.di	+ 1' 09"
3	Francesco Casagrande (ITA)	Lampre	+ 1' 27"
4	Franco Pellizotti (ITA)	Alessio	+ 1' 32"
5	Gilberto Simoni (ITA)	Saeco	s.t.
6	Marco Velo (ITA)	Fassa Bortolo	+ 1' 36"
7	Denis Lunghi (ITA)	Alessio	+ 1' 39"
8	Bo Hamburger (DEN)	Formaggi Pinzolo Fiavè	s.t.
9	Andrea Noè (ITA)	Alessio	s.t.
10	Marius Sabaliauskas (LTU)	Saeco	s.t.

== Stage 7 ==
17 May 2003 — Avezzano to Monte Terminillo, 146 km (91 mi)

Stage 7 Result

Rank	Rider	Team	Time
1	Stefano Garzelli (ITA)	Vini Caldirola–So.di	3h 55' 19"
2	Gilberto Simoni (ITA)	Saeco	s.t.
3	Andrea Noè (ITA)	Alessio	+ 2"
4	Pavel Tonkov (RUS)	CCC–Polsat	+ 14"
5	Eddy Mazzoleni (ITA)	Vini Caldirola–So.di	+ 37"
6	Marius Sabaliauskas (LTU)	Saeco	+ 38"
7	Raimondas Rumšas (LTU)	Lampre	s.t.
8	Franco Pellizotti (ITA)	Alessio	+ 53"
9	Yaroslav Popovych (UKR)	Landbouwkrediet–Colnago	+ 59"
10	Julio Alberto Pérez (MEX)	Ceramiche Panaria–Fiordo	+ 1' 21"

General classification after Stage 7

Rank	Rider	Team	Time
1	Stefano Garzelli (ITA)	Vini Caldirola–So.di	31h 39' 24"
2	Gilberto Simoni (ITA)	Saeco	+ 31"
3	Andrea Noè (ITA)	Alessio	+ 44"
4	Marius Sabaliauskas (LTU)	Saeco	+ 1' 28"
5	Franco Pellizotti (ITA)	Alessio	+ 1' 36"
6	Pavel Tonkov (RUS)	CCC–Polsat	+ 1' 40"
7	Raimondas Rumšas (LTU)	Lampre	+ 1' 54"
8	Yaroslav Popovych (UKR)	Landbouwkrediet–Colnago	+ 1' 56"
9	Georg Totschnig (AUT)	Gerolsteiner	+ 2' 16"
10	Eddy Mazzoleni (ITA)	Vini Caldirola–So.di	+ 3' 02"

== Stage 8 ==
18 May 2003 — Rieti to Arezzo, 214 km (133 mi)

Stage 8 Result

Rank	Rider	Team	Time
1	Mario Cipollini (ITA)	De Nardi–Colpack	5h 29' 46"
2	Robbie McEwen (AUS)	Lotto–Domo	s.t.
3	Alessandro Petacchi (ITA)	Fassa Bortolo	s.t.
4	Magnus Bäckstedt (SWE)	Team Fakta	s.t.
5	Isaac Gálvez (ESP)	Kelme–Costa Blanca	s.t.
6	Andris Naudužs (LAT)	CCC–Polsat	s.t.
7	Ján Svorada (CZE)	Lampre	s.t.
8	Angelo Furlan (ITA)	Alessio	s.t.
9	Bernhard Eisel (AUT)	FDJeux.com	s.t.
10	Crescenzo D'Amore (ITA)	Tenax	s.t.

General classification after Stage 8

Rank	Rider	Team	Time
1	Stefano Garzelli (ITA)	Vini Caldirola–So.di	37h 09' 10"
2	Gilberto Simoni (ITA)	Saeco	+ 31"
3	Andrea Noè (ITA)	Alessio	+ 54"
4	Franco Pellizotti (ITA)	Alessio	+ 1' 36"
5	Marius Sabaliauskas (LTU)	Saeco	+ 1' 38"
6	Pavel Tonkov (RUS)	CCC–Polsat	+ 1' 50"
7	Yaroslav Popovych (UKR)	Landbouwkrediet–Colnago	+ 1' 56"
8	Raimondas Rumšas (LTU)	Lampre	+ 2' 04"
9	Georg Totschnig (AUT)	Gerolsteiner	+ 2' 26"
10	Eddy Mazzoleni (ITA)	Vini Caldirola–So.di	+ 3' 12"

== Stage 9 ==
19 May 2003 — Arezzo to Montecatini Terme, 160 km (99 mi)

Stage 9 Result

Rank	Rider	Team	Time
1	Mario Cipollini (ITA)	De Nardi–Colpack	3h 41' 58"
2	Robbie McEwen (AUS)	Lotto–Domo	s.t.
3	Alessandro Petacchi (ITA)	Fassa Bortolo	s.t.
4	Ján Svorada (CZE)	Lampre	s.t.
5	Daniele Bennati (ITA)	De Nardi–Colpack	s.t.
6	Giovanni Lombardi (ITA)	De Nardi–Colpack	s.t.
7	Bernhard Eisel (AUT)	FDJeux.com	s.t.
8	Dario Pieri (ITA)	Saeco	s.t.
9	Werner Riebenbauer (AUT)	Team Fakta	s.t.
10	Lars Bak (DEN)	Team Fakta	s.t.

General classification after Stage 9

Rank	Rider	Team	Time
1	Stefano Garzelli (ITA)	Vini Caldirola–So.di	40h 51' 16"
2	Gilberto Simoni (ITA)	Saeco	+ 40"
3	Andrea Noè (ITA)	Alessio	+ 54"
4	Franco Pellizotti (ITA)	Alessio	+ 1' 36"
5	Marius Sabaliauskas (LTU)	Saeco	+ 1' 38"
6	Pavel Tonkov (RUS)	CCC–Polsat	+ 1' 50"
7	Yaroslav Popovych (UKR)	Landbouwkrediet–Colnago	+ 1' 56"
8	Raimondas Rumšas (LTU)	Lampre	+ 2' 04"
9	Georg Totschnig (AUT)	Gerolsteiner	+ 2' 26"
10	Eddy Mazzoleni (ITA)	Vini Caldirola–So.di	+ 3' 12"

== Stage 10 ==
20 May 2003 — Montecatini Terme to Faenza, 202 km (126 mi)

Stage 10 Result

Rank	Rider	Team	Time
1	Kurt Asle Arvesen (NOR)	Team Fakta	5h 34' 23"
2	Paolo Tiralongo (ITA)	Ceramiche Panaria–Fiordo	+ 1"
3	Gilberto Simoni (ITA)	Saeco	s.t.
4	Leonardo Bertagnolli (ITA)	Saeco	+ 10"
5	Giuliano Figueras (ITA)	Ceramiche Panaria–Fiordo	+ 26"
6	Michele Scarponi (ITA)	De Nardi–Colpack	s.t.
7	Kim Kirchen (LUX)	Fassa Bortolo	s.t.
8	Yaroslav Popovych (UKR)	Landbouwkrediet–Colnago	s.t.
9	Sandy Casar (FRA)	FDJeux.com	s.t.
10	Francesco Casagrande (ITA)	Lampre	s.t.

General classification after Stage 10

Rank	Rider	Team	Time
1	Gilberto Simoni (ITA)	Saeco	46h 25' 55"
2	Stefano Garzelli (ITA)	Vini Caldirola–So.di	+ 2"
3	Andrea Noè (ITA)	Alessio	+ 56"
4	Franco Pellizotti (ITA)	Alessio	+ 1' 38"
5	Pavel Tonkov (RUS)	CCC–Polsat	+ 1' 52"
6	Yaroslav Popovych (UKR)	Landbouwkrediet–Colnago	+ 1' 58"
7	Raimondas Rumšas (LTU)	Lampre	+ 2' 06"
8	Georg Totschnig (AUT)	Gerolsteiner	+ 2' 28"
9	Francesco Casagrande (ITA)	Lampre	+ 3' 23"
10	Michele Scarponi (ITA)	De Nardi–Colpack	+ 3' 45"

== Stage 11 ==
21 May 2003 — Faenza to San Donà di Piave, 222 km (138 mi)

Stage 11 Result

Rank	Rider	Team	Time
1	Robbie McEwen (AUS)	Lotto–Domo	5h 44' 13"
2	Alessandro Petacchi (ITA)	Fassa Bortolo	s.t.
3	Crescenzo D'Amore (ITA)	Tenax	s.t.
4	Mikhaylo Khalilov (UKR)	Colombia–Selle Italia	s.t.
5	Ján Svorada (CZE)	Lampre	s.t.
6	Guido Trenti (USA)	Fassa Bortolo	s.t.
7	Gerhard Trampusch (AUT)	Gerolsteiner	s.t.
8	Lorenzo Bernucci (ITA)	Landbouwkrediet–Colnago	s.t.
9	Andrus Aug (EST)	De Nardi-Colpack	s.t.
10	Marco Velo (ITA)	Fassa Bortolo	s.t.

General classification after Stage 11

Rank	Rider	Team	Time
1	Gilberto Simoni (ITA)	Saeco	52h 10' 08"
2	Stefano Garzelli (ITA)	Vini Caldirola–So.di	+ 2"
3	Andrea Noè (ITA)	Alessio	+ 56"
4	Franco Pellizotti (ITA)	Alessio	+ 1' 38"
5	Pavel Tonkov (RUS)	CCC–Polsat	+ 1' 52"
6	Yaroslav Popovych (UKR)	Landbouwkrediet–Colnago	+ 1' 58"
7	Raimondas Rumšas (LTU)	Lampre	+ 2' 06"
8	Georg Totschnig (AUT)	Gerolsteiner	+ 2' 28"
9	Francesco Casagrande (ITA)	Lampre	+ 3' 23"
10	Marco Velo (ITA)	Fassa Bortolo	+ 4' 01"
