= 2004 Giro d'Italia =

Race details
- Dates: 8–30 May 2004
- Stages: 20 + Prologue
- Distance: 3,423.9 km (2,128 mi)
- Winning time: 88h 40' 43"

Results
Jersey awarded to the overall winner	Winner	Damiano Cunego (ITA)	(Saeco)
	Second	Serhiy Honchar (UKR)	(De Nardi)
	Third	Gilberto Simoni (ITA)	(Saeco)
Jersey awarded to the points classification winner	Points	Alessandro Petacchi (ITA)	(Fassa Bortolo)
Jersey awarded to the mountains classification winner	Mountains	Fabian Wegmann (GER)	(Gerolsteiner)
	Combativity	Alessandro Petacchi (ITA)	(Fassa Bortolo)
Jersey awarded to the intergiro classification winner	Intergiro	Raffaele Illiano (ITA)	(Colombia–Selle Italia)
	Team	Saeco	
	Team points	Alessio–Bianchi	

The 2004 Giro d'Italia was the 87th edition of the Giro d'Italia, one of cycling's Grand Tours. It began in Genoa with a 6.9 km (4.3 mi) prologue. The race came to a close with a 133 km (82.6 mi) mass-start road stage that stretched from Clusone to Milan. Nineteen teams entered the race that was won by the Italian Damiano Cunego of the Saeco team. Second and third were the Ukrainian Serhiy Honchar and Italian Gilberto Simoni.

In the race's other classifications, Gerolsteiner rider Fabian Wegmann won the mountains classification, Raffaele Illiano of the Colombia–Selle Italia team won the intergiro classification, and Fassa Bortolo rider Alessandro Petacchi won the points classification. In addition to the points classification, Petacchi also won the secondary most combative and Azzurri d'Italia classifications. Saeco finished as the winners of the Trofeo Fast Team classification, ranking each of the nineteen teams contesting the race by lowest cumulative time. The other team classification, the Trofeo Super Team classification, where the teams' riders are awarded points for placing within the top twenty in each stage and the points are then totaled for each team was won by Alessio–Bianchi.

== Teams ==
A total of 19 teams were invited to participate in the 2004 Giro d'Italia. Each team sent a squad of nine riders, so the Giro began with a peloton of 171 cyclists. Out of the 171 riders that started this edition of the Giro d'Italia, a total of 140 riders made it to the finish in Milan.

The 19 teams that took part in the race were:

- Acqua & Sapone
- Alessio–Bianchi
- Ceramica Panaria–Margres
- Colombia–Selle Italia
- Chocolade Jacques–Wincor Nixdorf
- Domina Vacanze
- De Nardi–Piemme Telekom
- Fassa Bortolo
- FDJeux.com
- Formaggi Pinzolo Fiavè
- Gerolsteiner
- Lampre
- Landbouwkrediet–Colnago
- Lotto–Domo
- Phonak
- Saeco
- Saunier Duval–Prodir
- Tenax
- Vini Caldirola–Nobili Rubinetterie

== Route and stages ==
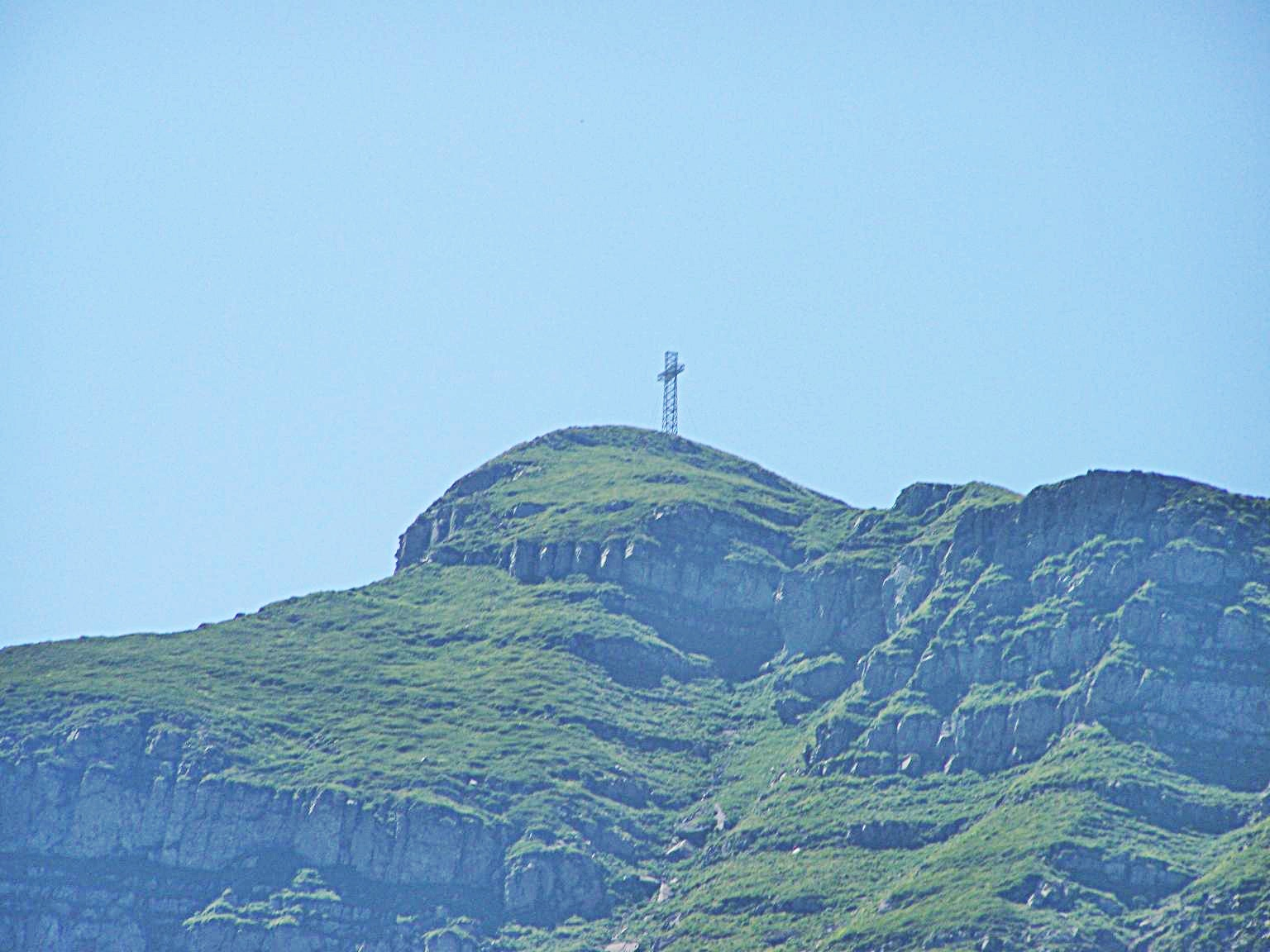
The Corno alle Scale hosted the finish of the 191 km (119 mi) third stage.

The route for the 2004 Giro d'Italia was unveiled by race director Angelo Zomegnan on 8 November 2003 in Milan. It contained two time trial events, all of which were individual. The organizers divided the remaining nineteen stages into three categories: flat stages, rolling stages, and mountain stages. Twelve of the stages were declared flat stages. Of the seven stages remaining, three stages were designated rolling stages and three were ranked as mountain stages. In the stages containing categorized climbs, three had summit finishes: stage 3, to Corno alle Scale; stage 7, to Montevergine di Mercogliano; and stage 18, to Bormio 2000. The organizers chose to include two rest days. When compared to the previous year's race, the race was 52.6 km (33 mi) shorter, contained the same amount of rest days, and the same amount of time trials. In addition, this race opened with a prologue, which the last year's race did not.

Stage characteristics and winners
Stage	Date	Course	Distance	Type	Winner
P	8 May	Genoa	6.9 km (4 mi)	Individual time trial	Bradley McGee (AUS)
1	9 May	Genoa to Alba	143 km (89 mi)	Medium mountain stage	Alessandro Petacchi (ITA)
2	10 May	Novi Ligure to Pontremoli	184 km (114 mi)	Medium mountain stage	Damiano Cunego (ITA)
3	11 May	Pontremoli to Corno alle Scale	191 km (119 mi)	Medium mountain stage	Gilberto Simoni (ITA)
4	12 May	Porretta Terme to Civitella in Val di Chiana	184 km (114 mi)	Flat stage	Alessandro Petacchi (ITA)
5	13 May	Civitella in Val di Chiana to Spoleto	177 km (110 mi)	Flat stage	Robbie McEwen (AUS)
6	14 May	Spoleto to Valmontone	164 km (102 mi)	Flat stage	Alessandro Petacchi (ITA)
7	15 May	Frosinone to Montevergine di Mercogliano	214 km (133 mi)	Medium mountain stage	Damiano Cunego (ITA)
8	16 May	Giffoni Valle Piana to Policoro	214 km (133 mi)	Flat stage	Alessandro Petacchi (ITA)
9	17 May	Policoro to Carovigno	142 km (88 mi)	Flat stage	Fred Rodriguez (USA)
	18 May	Rest day			
10	19 May	Porto Sant'Elpidio to Ascoli Piceno	146 km (91 mi)	Medium mountain stage	Alessandro Petacchi (ITA)
11	20 May	Porto Sant'Elpidio to Cesena	228 km (142 mi)	Medium mountain stage	Emanuele Sella (ITA)
12	21 May	Cesena to Treviso	210 km (130 mi)	Flat stage	Alessandro Petacchi (ITA)
13	22 May	Trieste to Trieste	52 km (32 mi)	Individual time trial	Serhiy Honchar (UKR)
14	23 May	Trieste to Pula	175 km (109 mi)	Flat stage	Alessandro Petacchi (ITA)
15	24 May	Poreč to San Vendemiano	234 km (145 mi)	Flat stage	Alessandro Petacchi (ITA)
16	25 May	San Vendemiano to Pfalzen	217 km (135 mi)	Mountain stage	Damiano Cunego (ITA)
	26 May	Rest day			
17	27 May	Bruneck to Fondo/Sarnonico	153 km (95 mi)	Mountain stage	Pavel Tonkov (RUS)
18	28 May	Cles to Bormio 2000	118 km (73 mi)	Mountain stage	Damiano Cunego (ITA)
19	29 May	Bormio to Presolana	122 km (76 mi)	Mountain stage	Stefano Garzelli (ITA)
20	30 May	Clusone to Milan	149 km (93 mi)	Flat stage	Alessandro Petacchi (ITA)
	Total		3,423.9 km (2,128 mi)		

== Race overview ==
The 2004 Giro d'Italia began with a 6.9 km (4.3 mi) prologue around the Italian city of Genoa. Bradley McGee won the first leg of the race after besting the second place rider Olaf Pollack by ten seconds. The race's first mass-start stage came down to a sprint finish in the city of Alba. The stage was won by Italian sprinter Alessandro Petacchi and Pollack managed to take the race lead after earning a twelve-second time bonus by finishing second on the stage. Stage 2 saw the race lead switch back to McGee after he finished second to the stage winner Damiano Cunego.

Success in stages was limited to eight of the competing teams, three of which achieved multiple stage victories, while two individual riders won multiple stages. The riders that won more than once were Alessandro Petacchi in stages 1, 4, 6, 8, 10, 12, 14, 15, and 20 and Damiano Cunego in stages 2, 7, 16, and 18. Fassa Bortolo won nine stages with Petacchi. Saeco won five stages, four with Cunego and one with Gilberto Simoni in stage 3. Vini Caldirola–Nobili Rubinetterie won two stages, with Pavel Tonkov in stage 17 and Stefano Garzelli in stage 19.

FDJeux.com, Lotto–Domo, Acqua & Sapone, Ceramica Panaria–Margres, and De Nardi each won one stage at the Giro d'Italia. FDJeux.com won the opening prologue with Bradley McGee. Lotto-Domo's Robbie McEwen won stage 4 by out-sprinting the rest of the field for the stage win, as did Acqua & Sapone rider Fred Rodriguez in stage 9. Ceramica Panaria-Margres's Emanuele Sella won the hilly stage 11. De Nardi rider Serhiy Honchar won the stage 13 individual time trial.

== Classification leadership ==
In the 2004 Giro d'Italia, four different jerseys were awarded. For the general classification, calculated by adding each cyclist's finishing times on each stage, and allowing time bonuses for the first three finishers on mass-start stages, the leader received a pink jersey. This classification is considered the most important of the Giro d'Italia, and the winner is considered the winner of the Giro.

Additionally, there was a points classification, which awarded a mauve jersey. In the points classification, cyclists got points for finishing in the top 15 in a stage. The stage win awarded 25 points, second place awarded 20 points, third 16, fourth 14, fifth 12, sixth 10, and one point fewer per place down the line, to a single point for 15th. In addition, points could be won in intermediate sprints.

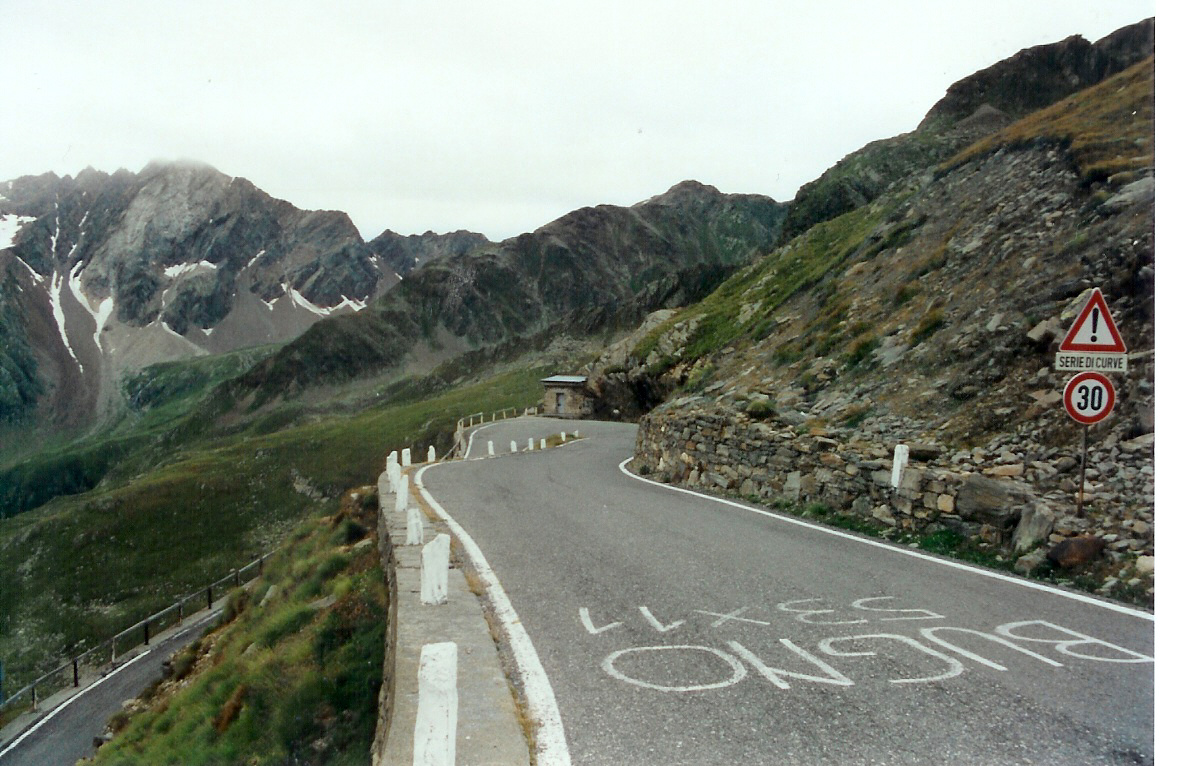
The Passo di Gavia was the Cima Coppi for the 2004 Giro d'Italia.

There was also a mountains classification, which awarded a green jersey. In the mountains classifications, points were won by reaching the top of a mountain before other cyclists. Each climb was categorized as either first, second, or third category, with more points available for the higher-categorized climbs. The highest point in the Giro (called the Cima Coppi), which in 2004 was Passo di Gavia, afforded more points than the other first-category climbs.

The fourth jersey represented the intergiro classification, marked by a blue jersey. The calculation for the intergiro is similar to that of the general classification, in each stage there is a midway point that the riders pass through a point and where their time is stopped. As the race goes on, their times compiled and the person with the lowest time is the leader of the intergiro classification and wears the blue jersey.

There were also two classifications for teams. The first was the Trofeo Fast Team. In this classification, the times of the best three cyclists per team on each stage were added; the leading team was the team with the lowest total time. The Trofeo Super Team was a team points classification, with the top 20 placed riders on each stage earning points (20 for first place, 19 for second place and so on, down to a single point for 20th) for their team.

The rows in the following table correspond to the jerseys awarded after that stage was run.

Classification leadership by stage
Stage	Winner	General classification	Points classification	Mountains classification	Intergiro classification	Trofeo Fast Team	Trofeo Super Team
P	Bradley McGee	Bradley McGee	not awarded	not awarded	not awarded	not awarded	not awarded
1	Alessandro Petacchi	Olaf Pollack	Alessandro Petacchi	Fabian Wegmann	Marlon Pérez Arango	Lampre	FDJeux.com; Lampre
2	Damiano Cunego	Bradley McGee	Damiano Cunego	Alexandre Moos	Ruggero Marzoli	Lampre	FDJeux.com
3	Gilberto Simoni	Gilberto Simoni	Damiano Cunego	Gilberto Simoni	Ruggero Marzoli	Saeco	Saeco
4	Alessandro Petacchi	Gilberto Simoni	Alessandro Petacchi	Gilberto Simoni	Alessandro Vanotti	Saeco	Saeco
5	Robbie McEwen	Gilberto Simoni	Robbie McEwen	Gilberto Simoni	Crescenzo d'Amore	Saeco	Saeco
6	Alessandro Petacchi	Gilberto Simoni	Alessandro Petacchi	Fabian Wegmann	Crescenzo d'Amore	Saeco	Acqua & Sapone
7	Damiano Cunego	Damiano Cunego	Alessandro Petacchi	Damiano Cunego	Massimo Strazzer	Saeco	Saeco
8	Alessandro Petacchi	Damiano Cunego	Alessandro Petacchi	Damiano Cunego	Massimo Strazzer	Saeco	Saeco
9	Fred Rodriguez	Damiano Cunego	Alessandro Petacchi	Damiano Cunego	Massimo Strazzer	Saeco	Saeco
10	Alessandro Petacchi	Damiano Cunego	Alessandro Petacchi	Damiano Cunego	Crescenzo d'Amore	Saeco	Saeco
11	Emanuele Sella	Damiano Cunego	Alessandro Petacchi	Fabian Wegmann	Marlon Pérez Arango	Saeco	Alessio–Bianchi
12	Alessandro Petacchi	Damiano Cunego	Alessandro Petacchi	Fabian Wegmann	Marlon Pérez Arango	Saeco	Alessio–Bianchi
13	Serhiy Honchar	Yaroslav Popovych	Alessandro Petacchi	Fabian Wegmann	Marlon Pérez Arango	Alessio–Bianchi	Alessio–Bianchi
14	Alessandro Petacchi	Yaroslav Popovych	Alessandro Petacchi	Fabian Wegmann	Crescenzo d'Amore	Alessio–Bianchi	Alessio–Bianchi
15	Alessandro Petacchi	Yaroslav Popovych	Alessandro Petacchi	Fabian Wegmann	Crescenzo d'Amore	Alessio–Bianchi	Alessio–Bianchi
16	Damiano Cunego	Damiano Cunego	Alessandro Petacchi	Fabian Wegmann	Crescenzo d'Amore	Saeco	Acqua & Sapone
17	Pavel Tonkov	Damiano Cunego	Alessandro Petacchi	Fabian Wegmann	Crescenzo d'Amore	Saeco	Alessio–Bianchi
18	Damiano Cunego	Damiano Cunego	Alessandro Petacchi	Damiano Cunego	Crescenzo d'Amore	Saeco	Alessio–Bianchi
19	Stefano Garzelli	Damiano Cunego	Alessandro Petacchi	Fabian Wegmann	Raffaele Illiano	Saeco	Alessio–Bianchi
20	Alessandro Petacchi	Damiano Cunego	Alessandro Petacchi	Fabian Wegmann	Raffaele Illiano	Saeco	Alessio–Bianchi
Final		Damiano Cunego	Alessandro Petacchi	Fabian Wegmann	Raffaele Illiano	Saeco	Alessio–Bianchi

== Final standings ==
Legend
Pink jersey	Denotes the winner of the General classification	Green jersey	Denotes the winner of the Mountains classification
Purple jersey	Denotes the winner of the Points classification	Blue jersey	Denotes the winner of the Intergiro classification

=== General classification ===
	Rider	Team	Time
1	Damiano Cunego (ITA)	Saeco	88h 40' 43"
2	Serhiy Honchar (UKR)	De Nardi–Piemme Telekom	+ 2' 02"
3	Gilberto Simoni (ITA)	Saeco	+ 2' 05"
4	Dario Cioni (ITA)	Fassa Bortolo	+ 4' 36"
5	Yaroslav Popovych (UKR)	Landbouwkrediet–Colnago	+ 5' 05"
6	Stefano Garzelli (ITA)	Vini Caldirola–Nobili Rubinetterie	+ 5' 31"
7	Wladimir Belli (ITA)	Lampre	+ 6' 12"
8	Bradley McGee (AUS)	FDJeux.com	+ 6' 15"
9	Tadej Valjavec (SLO)	Phonak	+ 6' 34"
10	Juan Manuel Gárate (ESP)	Lampre	+ 7' 47"

=== Points classification ===
	Rider	Team	Points
1	Alessandro Petacchi (ITA)	Fassa Bortolo	250
2	Damiano Cunego (ITA)	Saeco	153
3	Olaf Pollack (GER)	Gerolsteiner	148
4	Alexandre Usov (BLR)	Phonak	111
5	Marco Zanotti (ITA)	Vini Caldirola–Nobili Rubinetterie	102
6	Fred Rodriguez (USA)	Acqua & Sapone	96
7	Bradley McGee (AUS)	FDJeux.com	88
8	Gilberto Simoni (ITA)	Saeco	78
9	Stefano Garzelli (ITA)	Vini Caldirola–Nobili Rubinetterie	76
10	Iván Parra (COL)	De Nardi–Piemme Telekom	73

=== Mountains classification ===
	Rider	Team	Points
1	Fabian Wegmann (GER)	Gerolsteiner	56
2	Damiano Cunego (ITA)	Saeco	54
3	Gilberto Simoni (ITA)	Saeco	36
4	Stefano Garzelli (ITA)	Vini Caldirola–Nobili Rubinetterie	33
5	Alexandre Moos (SUI)	Phonak	27
6	Vladimir Miholjević (CRO)	Alessio–Bianchi	20
7	Raffaele Illiano (ITA)	Colombia–Selle Italia	16
8	Niki Aebersold (SUI)	Phonak	15
9	Luis Felipe Laverde (COL)	Formaggi Pinzolo Fiavè	14
10	Bradley McGee (AUS)	FDJeux.com	13

=== Intergiro classification ===
	Rider	Team	Time
1	Raffaele Illiano (ITA)	Colombia–Selle Italia	49h 39' 14"
2	Crescenzo d'Amore (ITA)	Acqua & Sapone	+ 13"
3	Mariano Piccoli (ITA)	Lampre	+ 19"
4	Marlon Pérez Arango (COL)	Colombia–Selle Italia	+ 22"
5	Alessandro Vanotti (ITA)	De Nardi–Piemme Telekom	+ 36"
6	Aart Vierhouten (NED)	Lotto–Domo	+ 39"
7	Robert Förster (GER)	Gerolsteiner	+ 39"
8	Daniele Righi (ITA)	Lampre	+ 44"
9	Alessandro Bertolini (ITA)	Alessio–Bianchi	+ 56"
10	Yaroslav Popovych (UKR)	Landbouwkrediet–Colnago	+ 1' 05"

=== Trofeo Fast Team classification ===
	Team	Time
1	Saeco	265h 52' 05"
2	Vini Caldirola–Nobili Rubinetterie	+ 19' 15"
3	Lampre	+ 26' 12"
4	Alessio–Bianchi	+ 29' 13"
5	Saunier Duval–Prodir	+ 39' 21"
6	Ceramica Panaria–Margres	+ 43' 02"
7	Acqua & Sapone	+ 57' 54"
8	Phonak	+ 1h 03' 04"
9	De Nardi–Piemme Telekom	+ 1h 20' 18"
10	Formaggi Pinzolo Fiave	+ 2h 04' 05"

=== Trofeo Super Team classification ===
	Team	Points
1	Alessio–Bianchi	384
2	Saeco	359
3	Fassa Bortolo	339
4	Lampre	327
5	Acqua & Sapone	315
6	Vini Caldirola–Nobili Rubinetterie	301
7	Ceramica Panaria–Margres	273
8	Phonak	265
9	Gerolsteiner	250
10	De Nardi–Piemme Telekom	217

=== Minor classifications ===
Other less well-known classifications, whose leaders did not receive a special jersey, were awarded during the Giro. Other awards included the Combativity classification, which was a compilation of points gained for position on crossing intermediate sprints, mountain passes and stage finishes. Italian Alessandro Petacchi won the Most Combative classification. The Azzurri d'Italia classification was based on finishing order, but points were awarded only to the top three finishers in each stage. The Azzurri d'Italia classification was also won by Alessandro Petacchi. The Trofeo Fuga Piaggio classification rewarded riders who took part in a breakaway at the head of the field, each rider in an escape of ten or fewer riders getting one point for each kilometre that the group stayed clear. The classification was won by Daniele Righi. Teams were given penalty points for minor technical infringements. Phonak was the most successful in avoiding penalties, and so won the Fair Play classification.
