= Clásica Memorial Txuma =

Race details
- Date: May
- Region: Basque Country, Spain
- Discipline: Road race
- Competition: UCI Europe Tour
- Type: Single day race

History
- First edition: 1995
- Editions: 13
- Final edition: 2007
- First winner: Carlos Zelaia (ESP)
- Most wins: No repeat winners
- Final winner: Boris Shpilevsky (RUS)

The Clásica Memorial Txuma was a road bicycle race held annually in Spain. It was organized as a 1.2 event on the UCI Europe Tour.

== Winners ==
Year	Country	Rider	Team
1995	Spain	Carlos Zelaia	
1996	France	Yvan Becaas	
1997	Spain	Gorka Gerrikagoitia	
1998	Spain	Aitor Silloniz	
1999	Lithuania	Marius Sabaliauskas	Vélo-Club La Pomme Marseille
2000	Spain	Rubén Plaza	Banesto Amateur
2001	Spain	Iñigo Urretxua	
2002	Spain	Javier Ramírez	Ávila Rojas
2003	Belgium	Jurgen Van den Broeck	CC Arenal-Emaya
2004	Spain	Eugenio Pineda	
2005	Russia	Nikolay Trusov	Lokomotiv
2006	Russia	Mikhail Ignatiev	Tinkoff Restaurants
2007	Russia	Boris Shpilevsky	Preti Mangimi
