= Borrajo =

Borrajo is a surname. Notable people with the surname include:

- Alejandro Borrajo (born 1980), Argentine cyclist
- Jonathan Borrajo (born 1987), American soccer player.
