= San Pietro, Vidiciatico =

Church in Lizzano in Belvedere, Italy

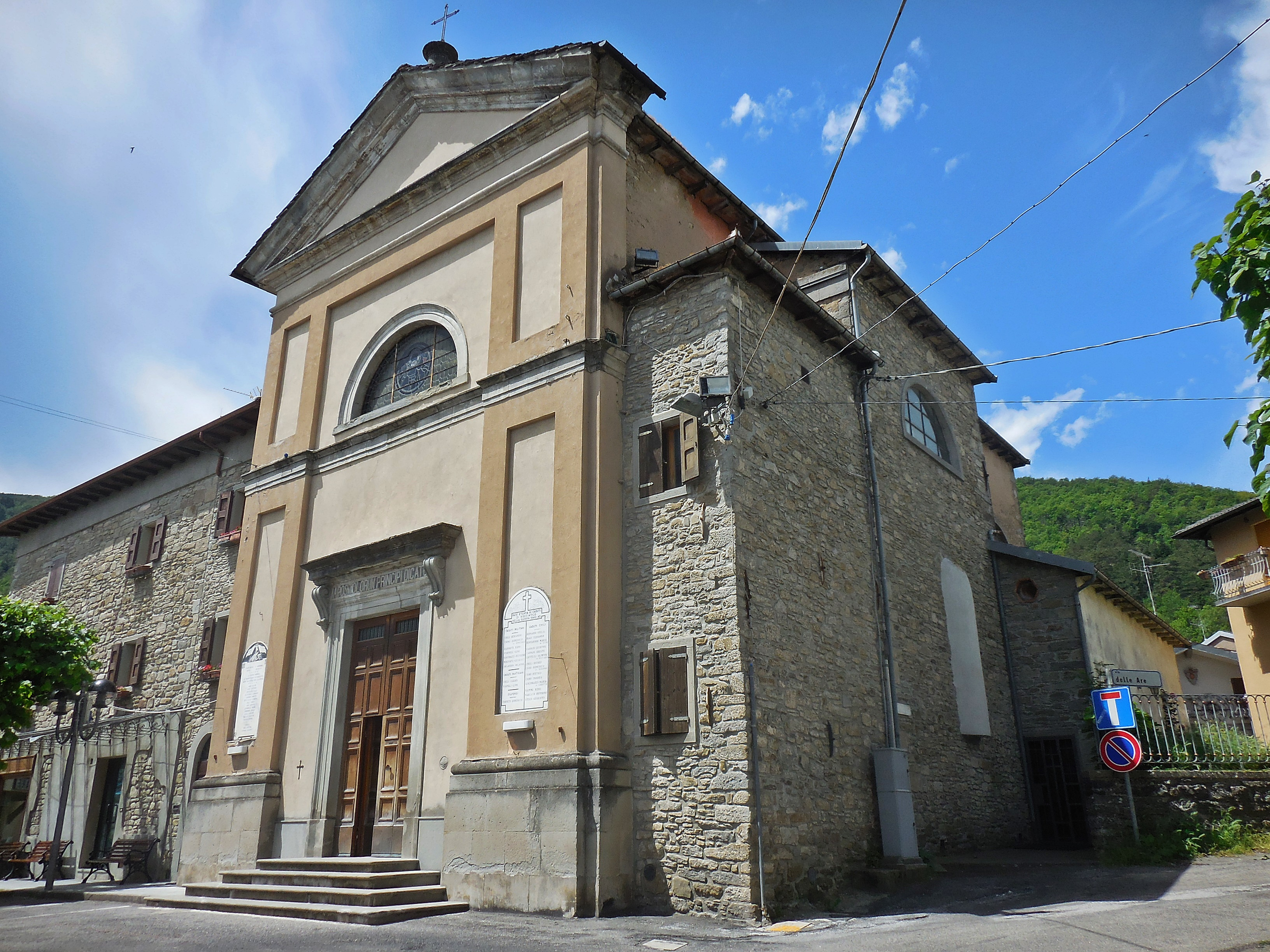

San Pietro in Vidiciatico is a Roman Catholic parish church located in the neighborhood of Vidiciatico, which belongs to the township of Lizzano in Belvedere in the Province of Bologna, Italy.

The present church was erected in the 1882–1884, to replace a Romanesque-style church built in 1393. Of the old church only the apse portion remains with a mullioned window. The adjacent square bell-tower was built at a site that likely was part of an ancient castle tower. The interior houses an altarpiece by Antonio Crespi, son of the more famous Giuseppe Crespi, depicting Jesus granting St Peter the Keys of his Church. Nearby is the Oratory of San Rocco, built in 1631 after the ebbing of the black plague.
