= 2008 Tirreno–Adriatico =

Race details
- Dates: 12–18 March 2008
- Stages: 7
- Distance: 1,122 km (697.2 mi)
- Winning time: 28h 08' 21"

Results
Jersey awarded to the overall winner	Winner	Fabian Cancellara (SUI)	(Team CSC)
	Second	Enrico Gasparotto (ITA)	(Barloworld)
	Third	Thomas Lövkvist (SWE)	(Team High Road)
Jersey awarded to the points classification winner	Points	Óscar Freire (ESP)	(Rabobank (cycling))
Jersey awarded to the mountains classification winner	Mountains	Lloyd Mondory (FRA)	(Ag2r–La Mondiale)
Jersey awarded to the youth classification winner	Youth	Thomas Lövkvist (SWE)	(Team High Road)
	Team	(United States) Team High Road	

The 2008 Tirreno–Adriatico, the 43rd running of the race, took place from 12 March to 18 March 2008. The race started in Civitavecchia and ended in San Benedetto del Tronto.

== Teams ==
Twenty-one teams, containing a total of 168 riders, participated in the race:

- Quick-Step
- Ag2r–La Mondiale
- Barloworld
- Caisse d'Epargne
- Cofidis
- CSF Group–Navigare
- Diquigiovanni–Androni
- Euskaltel–Euskadi
- Française des Jeux
- Gerolsteiner
- Team High Road
- Lampre
- Liquigas
- LPR Brakes–Ballan
- Rabobank
- Saunier Duval–Scott
- Silence–Lotto
- Slipstream–Chipotle
- Team CSC
- Team Milram
- Tinkoff Credit Systems

== Route ==
Stage characteristics and winners
Stage	Date	Course	Distance	Type	Winner
1	12 March	Civitavecchia to Civitavecchia	160 km (99 mi)	Flat stage	Óscar Freire (ESP)
2	13 March	Civitavecchia to Gubbio	203 km (126 mi)	Hilly stage	Raffaele Illiano (ITA)
3	14 March	Gubbio to Montelupone	195 km (121 mi)	Hilly stage	Joaquim Rodríguez (ESP)
4	15 March	Porto Recanati to Civitanova Marche	166 km (103 mi)	Flat stage	Alessandro Petacchi (ITA)
5	16 March	Macerata to Recanati	26 km (16 mi)	Individual time trial	Fabian Cancellara (SUI)
6	17 March	Civitanova Marche to Castelfidardo	196 km (122 mi)	Hilly stage	Óscar Freire (ESP)
7	18 March	San Benedetto del Tronto to San Benedetto del Tronto	176 km (109 mi)	Flat stage	Francesco Chicchi (ITA)

== Stages ==
=== Stage 1 ===
12 March 2008 — Civitavecchia to Civitavecchia, 160 km (99 mi)

Stage 1 Results

	Cyclist	Team	Time
1	Óscar Freire (ESP)	Rabobank	4h 10' 01"
2	Alessandro Petacchi (ITA)	Team Milram	s.t.
3	José Joaquín Rojas (ESP)	Caisse d'Epargne	s.t.
4	Erik Zabel (GER)	Team Milram	s.t.
5	Baden Cooke (AUS)	Barloworld	s.t.

General Classification after Stage 1

	Cyclist	Team	Time
1	Óscar Freire (ESP)	Rabobank	4h 09' 51"
2	Alessandro Petacchi (ITA)	Team Milram	+4"
3	José Joaquín Rojas (ESP)	Caisse d'Epargne	+6"
4	Mikhail Ignatiev (RUS)	Tinkoff Credit Systems	+7"
5	Yuriy Krivtsov (UKR)	Ag2r–La Mondiale	+8"

=== Stage 2 ===
13 March 2008 — Civitavecchia to Gubbio, 203 km (126 mi)

Stage 2 Results

	Cyclist	Team	Time
1	Raffaele Illiano (ITA)	Serramenti Diquigiovanni	5h 01' 10"
2	Enrico Gasparotto (ITA)	Barloworld	s.t
3	Niklas Axelsson (SWE)	Serramenti Diquigiovanni	+ 3"
4	Linus Gerdemann (GER)	Team High Road	+ 9"
5	Riccardo Riccò (ITA)	Saunier Duval–Scott	+ 17"

General Classification after Stage 2

	Cyclist	Team	Time
1	Enrico Gasparotto (ITA)	Barloworld	9h 11' 05"
2	Niklas Axelsson (SWE)	Serramenti Diquigiovanni	+ 2"
3	Linus Gerdemann (GER)	Team High Road	+ 6"
4	Riccardo Riccò (ITA)	Saunier Duval–Scott	+ 23"
5	Eros Capecchi (ITA)	Saunier Duval–Scott	s.t

=== Stage 3 ===
14 March 2008 — Gubbio to Montelupone, 195 km (121 mi)

Stage 3 Results

	Cyclist	Team	Time
1	Joaquim Rodríguez (ESP)	Caisse d'Epargne	4h 49' 59"
2	Danilo Di Luca (ITA)	L.P.R. Brakes	+ 12"
3	Niklas Axelsson (SWE)	Serramenti Diquigiovanni	s.t.
4	Thomas Lövkvist (SWE)	Team High Road	s.t.
5	Leonardo Piepoli (ITA)	Saunier Duval–Scott	+ 17"

General Classification after Stage 3

	Cyclist	Team	Time
1	Niklas Axelsson (SWE)	Serramenti Diquigiovanni	13h 56' 14"
2	Enrico Gasparotto (ITA)	Barloworld	+ 10"
3	Joaquim Rodríguez (ESP)	Caisse d'Epargne	+ 18"
4	Linus Gerdemann (GER)	Team High Road	+ 24"
5	Danilo Di Luca (ITA)	L.P.R. Brakes	+ 32"

=== Stage 4 ===
15 March 2008 — Porto Recanati to Civitanova Marche, 166 km (103 mi)

Stage 4 Results

	Cyclist	Team	Time
1	Alessandro Petacchi (ITA)	Milram	3h 59' 58"
2	Óscar Freire (ESP)	Rabobank	s.t.
3	Filippo Pozzato (ITA)	Liquigas	s.t.
4	Gerald Ciolek (GER)	Team High Road	s.t.
5	José Joaquín Rojas (ESP)	Caisse d'Epargne	s.t.

General Classification after Stage 4

	Cyclist	Team	Time
1	Niklas Axelsson (SWE)	Serramenti Diquigiovanni	17h 56' 12"
2	Enrico Gasparotto (ITA)	Barloworld	+ 10"
3	Joaquim Rodríguez (ESP)	Caisse d'Epargne	+ 18"
4	Linus Gerdemann (GER)	Team High Road	+ 24"
5	Danilo Di Luca (ITA)	L.P.R. Brakes	+ 32"

=== Stage 5 ===
16 March 2008 — Macerata to Recanati, 26 km (16 mi) (ITT)

Stage 5 results

	Cyclist	Team	Time
1	Fabian Cancellara (SUI)	Team CSC	33' 41"
2	David Zabriskie (USA)	Slipstream–Chipotle	+ 22"
3	Thomas Lövkvist (SWE)	Team High Road	+ 52"
4	Markus Fothen (GER)	Gerolsteiner	+ 56"
5	Enrico Gasparotto (ITA)	Barloworld	+ 1' 00"

General Classification after Stage 5

	Cyclist	Team	Time
1	Fabian Cancellara (SUI)	Team CSC	18h 30' 47"
2	Enrico Gasparotto (ITA)	Barloworld	+ 16"
3	Thomas Lövkvist (SWE)	Team High Road	+ 40"
4	Linus Gerdemann (GER)	Team High Road	+ 46"
5	Markus Fothen (GER)	Gerolsteiner	+ 53"

=== Stage 6 ===
17 March 2008 — Civitanova Marche to Castelfidardo, 196 km (122 mi)

Stage 6 Results

	Cyclist	Team	Time
1	Óscar Freire (ESP)	Rabobank	4h 46' 44"
2	Filippo Pozzato (ITA)	Liquigas	s.t.
3	Danilo Di Luca (ITA)	L.P.R. Brakes	s.t.
4	Giovanni Visconti (ITA)	Quick-Step	s.t.
5	Tadej Valjavec (SLO)	Ag2r–La Mondiale	s.t.

General Classification after Stage 6

	Cyclist	Team	Time
1	Fabian Cancellara (SUI)	Team CSC	23h 17' 31"
2	Enrico Gasparotto (ITA)	Barloworld	+ 16"
3	Thomas Lövkvist (SWE)	Team High Road	+ 40"
4	Markus Fothen (GER)	Gerolsteiner	+ 53"
5	Niklas Axelsson (SWE)	Serramenti Diquigiovanni	+ 1' 32"

=== Stage 7 ===
18 March 2008 — San Benedetto del Tronto to San Benedetto del Tronto, 176 km (109 mi)

Stage 7 Results

	Cyclist	Team	Time
1	Francesco Chicchi (ITA)	Liquigas	4h 50' 50"
2	Danilo Napolitano (ITA)	Lampre	s.t.
3	Mark Cavendish (GBR)	Team High Road	s.t.
4	Robbie McEwen (AUS)	Silence–Lotto	S.t.
5	Danilo Hondo (ITA)	Serramenti Diquigiovanni	s.t.

General Classification after Stage 7

	Cyclist	Team	Time
1	Fabian Cancellara (SUI)	Team CSC	28h 08' 21"
2	Enrico Gasparotto (ITA)	Barloworld	+ 16"
3	Thomas Lövkvist (SWE)	Team High Road	+ 40"
4	Markus Fothen (GER)	Gerolsteiner	+ 53"
5	Niklas Axelsson (SWE)	Serramenti Diquigiovanni	+ 1' 32"

== Jersey progress ==
Stage (Winner)	General Classification	Points Classification	Mountains Classification	Young Rider Classification	Team Classification
Stage 1 (Óscar Freire)	Óscar Freire	Óscar Freire	Yuriy Krivtsov	José Joaquín Rojas	Rabobank
Stage 2 (Raffaele Illiano)	Enrico Gasparotto	Raffaele Illiano	Niklas Axelsson	Riccardo Riccò	Ag2r–La Mondiale
Stage 3 (Joaquim Rodríguez)	Niklas Axelsson	Enrico Gasparotto	Lloyd Mondory	Thomas Lövkvist	Serramenti Diquigiovanni
Stage 4 (Alessandro Petacchi)	Niklas Axelsson	Enrico Gasparotto	Lloyd Mondory	Thomas Lövkvist	Serramenti Diquigiovanni
Stage 5 (Fabian Cancellara)	Fabian Cancellara	Enrico Gasparotto	Lloyd Mondory	Thomas Lövkvist	Team High Road
Stage 6 (Óscar Freire)	Fabian Cancellara	Óscar Freire	Juan José Oroz	Thomas Lövkvist	Team High Road
Stage 7 (Francesco Chicchi)	Fabian Cancellara	Óscar Freire	Lloyd Mondory	Thomas Lövkvist	Team High Road
Final	Fabian Cancellara	Óscar Freire	Lloyd Mondory	Thomas Lövkvist	Team High Road

Jersey wearers when one rider is leading two or more competitions

- On stage 2, Alessandro Petacchi wore the points jersey
