= Preti Mangimi =

Road bicycle racing team

Team information
- UCI code: GAP
- Registered: Luxembourg
- Founded: 2007
- Disbanded: 2008
- Discipline: Road
- Status: Professional Continental

Key personnel
- General manager: Marino Basso

Team name history
- 2007 2008: Kio Ene-Tonazzi-DMT; Preti Mangimi-Prisma Stufe

Preti Mangimi (UCI team code: GAP) was a professional continental road bicycle racing team based in Italy, which participated in UCI Europe Tour and when selected as a wildcard to UCI ProTour events. The team was managed by former World Road Race champion Marino Basso. Alberto Elli and Leonardo Levati were directeur sportifs with the team. One of the riders of the team Russian Boris Shiplevsky was the first wearer of the leader of the UCI Europe Tour in 2008. Financial problems forced the team to fold after just one season, when no cosponsor could be found.

== Final roster ==
Rider	Date of birth
Mirko Allegrini (ITA)	October 19, 1981 (age 44)
Alessandro Bertuola (ITA)	September 13, 1979 (age 47)
Vincenzo Centrone (LUX)	January 23, 1976 (age 50)
Salvatore Commesso (ITA)	March 28, 1975 (age 51)
Carlo Corra (ITA)	January 13, 1974 (age 52)
Steve Fogen (LUX)	September 28, 1979 (age 46)
Mattia Gavazzi (ITA)	June 14, 1983 (age 43)
Gianluca Geremia (ITA)	April 26, 1981 (age 45)

Rider	Date of birth
Michele Gobbi (ITA)	August 10, 1977 (age 49)
Serhiy Honchar (UKR)	July 3, 1970 (age 56)
Massimo Mazzanti (ITA)	June 7, 1982 (age 44)
Marco Osella (ITA)	January 6, 1981 (age 45)
Mattia Parravicini (ITA)	May 20, 1982 (age 44)
Fabio Sacchi (ITA)	May 22, 1974 (age 52)
Boris Shpilevsky (RUS)	August 20, 1982 (age 44)
Marco Zanotti (ITA)	January 21, 1974 (age 52)
