= Marius Sabaliauskas =

Lithuanian cyclist (born 1978)

Personal information
- Full name: Marius Sabaliauskas
- Born: 15 November 1978 (age 47) Kaunas

Cycling career
- Sport: Cycling
- Current team: Retired
- Discipline: Road
- Role: Rider

Professional teams
- 2001-2004: Saeco
- 2005-2006: Lampre-Caffita

Marius Sabaliauskas (born 15 November 1978 in Kaunas) is a former Lithuanian cyclist. He ended his career early in 2006 at the age of 28.

== Palmares ==
1999
Clásica Memorial Txuma

2000
2nd stage Vuelta a Navarra
Giro del Canavese

2003
2nd overall Giro dell'Appennino

2004
3rd overall Rund um Hainleite

== Results on the grand tours ==
=== Tour de France ===
- 2004:42nd

=== Giro d'Italia ===
- 2002: DNF
- 2003: 48th
- 2005: 66th

=== Vuelta a España ===
- 2004: 87th
