= Lizzano in Belvedere =

- Comune
- Comune di Lizzano in Belvedere
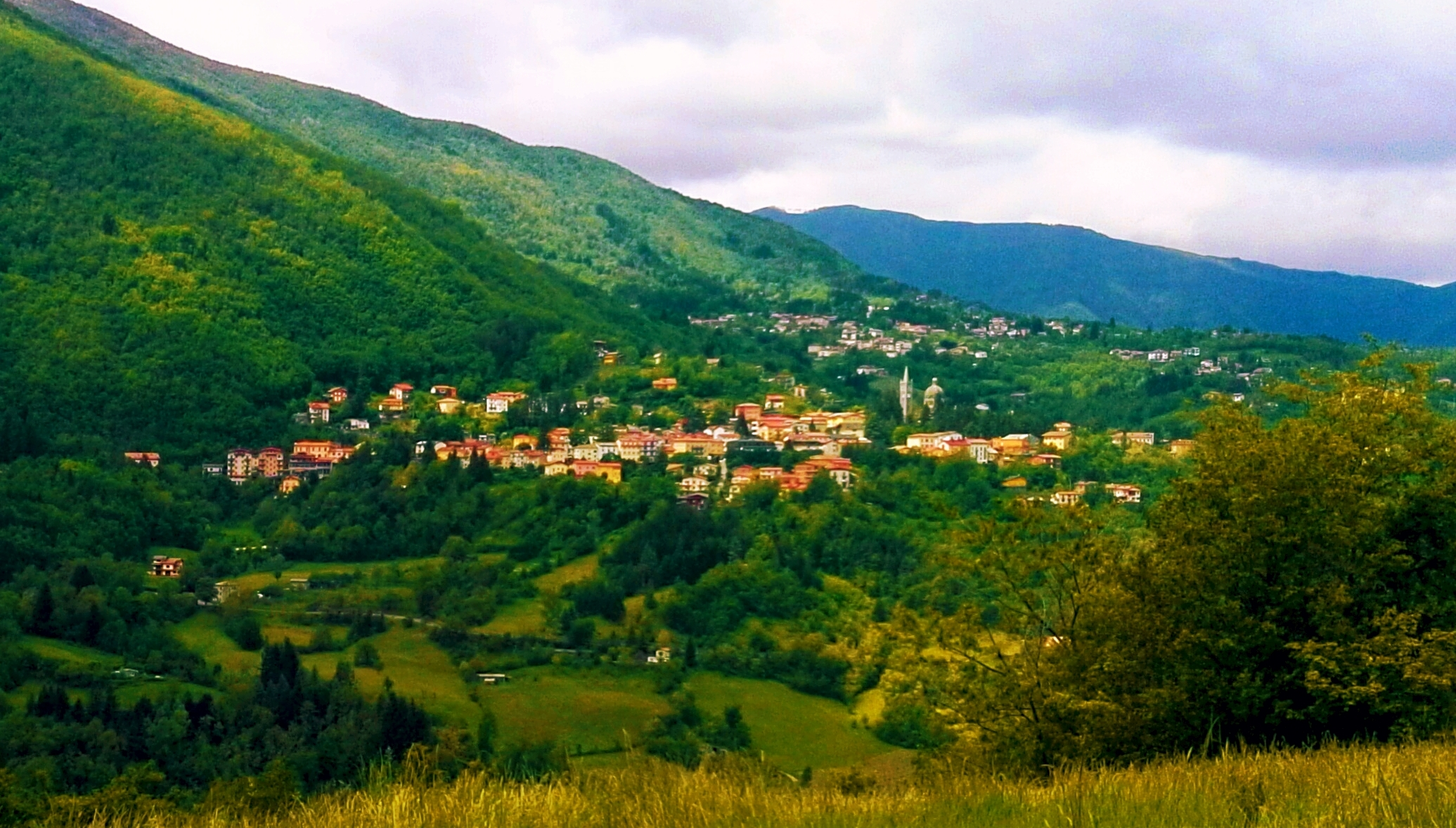

- Coat of arms

- Location within Italy Location within Emilia-Romagna
- Coordinates: 44°10′N 10°54′E
- Country: Italy
- Region: Emilia-Romagna
- Metropolitan city: Bologna (BO)
- Frazioni: Farnè, Gabba, La Cà, Madonna dell'Acero, Monteacuto, Pianaccio, Poggiolforato, Querciola, Rocca Corneta, Vidiciatico

Government
  - Mayor: Sergio Polmonari

Area
  - Total: 85.45 km^{2} (32.99 sq mi)
- Elevation: 640 m (2,100 ft)

Population (30 September 2017)
  - Total: 2,216
  - Density: 25.93/km^{2} (67.17/sq mi)
- Time zone: UTC+1 (CET)
  - Summer (DST): UTC+2 (CEST)
- Postal code: 40042
- Dialing code: 0534
- Website: Official website

Lizzano in Belvedere (High Mountain Bolognese: Lizã; City Bolognese: Lizàn) is a comune (municipality) in the Metropolitan City of Bologna in the Italian region Emilia-Romagna, located about 50 kilometres (31 mi) southwest of Bologna.

Among the parishes is the church of San Pietro, Vidiciatico.

== Twin towns — sister cities ==
Lizzano in Belvedere is twinned with:

- Hilzingen, Germany
