= Olaf Pollack =

German cyclist (born 1973)

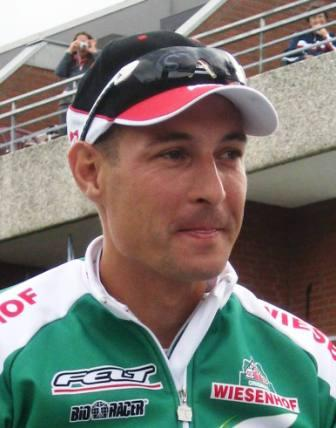
- Pollack in 2007

Personal information
- Full name: Olaf Pollack
- Born: 20 September 1973 (age 53) Räckelwitz, Bezirk Dresden, East Germany

Cycling career
- Sport: Cycling
- Current team: Retired
- Disciplines: Road and track
- Role: Rider

Professional teams
- 1997–1999: Agro–Adler Brandenburg
- 2000–2004: Gerolsteiner
- 2005–2006: T-Mobile Team
- 2007: Wiesenhof–Felt
- 2008: Team Volksbank
- 2009: RSC Cottbus
Medal record
Representing Germany
Men's track cycling
Olympic Games
Gold medal – first place	2000 Sydney	4000m Pursuit
World Championships
Silver medal – second place	2008 Manchester	Madison
Bronze medal – third place	1999 Berlin	Madison

Olaf Pollack (born 20 September 1973) is a German former professional track and road racing cyclist specializing in sprint races and competitions.

== Track race ==
At the 2000 Olympic Games, Pollack entered the team pursuit and the madison. Pollack rode in the qualifying rounds for the team pursuit, but was not used in the German team that rode the final and won; Pollack still received a golden medal. For winning the gold medal at the Olympic Games 2000 Pollack was decorated with the Silver Laurel Leaf by Bundespräsident Johannes Rau (President of the Federal Republic of Germany) on 2 February 2001 At the madison, Pollack rode together with Guido Fulst, and finished in sixth place.

Pollack returned to the track in 2008, when he rode at the 2008 UCI Track Cycling World Championships, and finished in second place in the madison. At the 2008 Olympic Games, Pollack rode the madison together with Roger Kluge, and they finished fifth.

== Road race ==
Olaf Pollack began his road cycling career at small German team Agro-Adler-Brandenburg in 1997. After 3 years he left for Team Gerolsteiner. In 2005 and 2006 he rode for T-Mobile, leaving in 2007 for Team Wiesenhof. The highlight of his road cycling career was wearing the pink jersey as leader of the general classification at the 2004 and 2006 Giro d'Italia.

In August 2009, an eye problem made him end his cycling career, but a month later it became known that he had failed a drug test. In 2009 he was suspended by the German Cycling Federation.

== Major results ==
1990
2nd, World Championship, Track, Team Pursuit, Juniors, Middlesbrough
1991
2nd, World Championship, Track, Team Pursuit, Juniors
1997 – Agro Adler
1st, 1 stage — Niedersachsen Rundfahrt
1st, 1 stage — Clásico RCN
1998 – Agro-Adler-Brandenburg
1st, 2 stages — Tour of Slovenia
1st, 2 stages — Olympia's Ronde
1999 – Agro-Adler-Brandenburg
1st, 1 stage — Peace Race
1st, 1 stage — Tour of Chile
2nd, Rund um Berlin
2nd, National Championship, Track, Team Pursuit, Elite
2nd, National Championship, Road, ITT, Elite
3rd, World Championship, Track, Madison, Elite, Berlin
3rd, General Classification, Niedersachsen Rundfahrt

1st, 1 stage

2000 – Team Gerolsteiner
1st, 2 stages — Rapport-Toer
1st, 1 stage — Tour of Tasmania
1st, National Championship, Track, Madison, Elite
2nd, Six Days, Berlin
2001 – Team Gerolsteiner
1st, 2 stages — Niedersachsen Rundfahrt
1st — Rund um die Nürnberger Altstadt
2002 – Team Gerolsteiner
1st overall — Groningen–Münster
1st, General Classification — Niedersachsen Rundfahrt

1st, Stage 2 and Stage 3

1st, Stages 1, 2, 3 — Peace Race
1st, Points Classification — Danmark Rundt

1st, Stage 5

1st, Groningen-Münster
1st, Stage 1 — Hessen-Rundfahrt
2nd, Rund um die Nürnberger Altstadt
2nd, Paris–Brussels
3rd, General Classification Driedaagse van West-Vlaanderen
3rd, Criterium, Bad Salgau
2003 – Team Gerolsteiner
1st, Points Classification — Bayern Rundfahrt
1st, Stage 5 — Niedersachsen Rundfahrt
1st, Stage 7 — Deutschland Tour
2nd, Krefeld–Rund um die Sparkasse
2nd, General Classification Tour of Qatar
2nd, Groningen–Münster
2004 – Team Gerolsteiner
1st, Stage 2 — Sachsen-Tour
1st (after Stage 1), general classification — Giro d'Italia

112th, General Classification

2nd, Criterium, Radevormwald
2005 – T-Mobile Team
2006 – T-Mobile Team
Giro d'Italia

3rd, points classification
132nd, General Classification

Tour of California

1st, Stages 6 & 7
1st, Points Classification (Green jersey)

1st, Stage 1 Cologne Classic
1st, Stage 4 Post Danmark Rundt
2nd, Criterium, Radevormwald
2007 – Team Wiesenhof–Felt
1st, Stage 1, Critérium International
1st, Rheda–Wiedenbrück
1st, Dahme Trophy
2nd, Derny Cup, Griessen
2nd, National Championship, Track, Pursuit, Elite, Germany, Berlin
2nd, National Championship, Track, Team Pursuit, Elite, Germany, Berlin
2nd, National Championship, Track, Madison, Elite, Germany, Berlin
2nd, Rund um die Nürnberger Altstadt, Nürnberg
3rd, Six Days, Stuttgart
2008
3rd, World Cup, Track, Madison, Los Angeles
