= Dario Cioni =

English-Italian cyclist

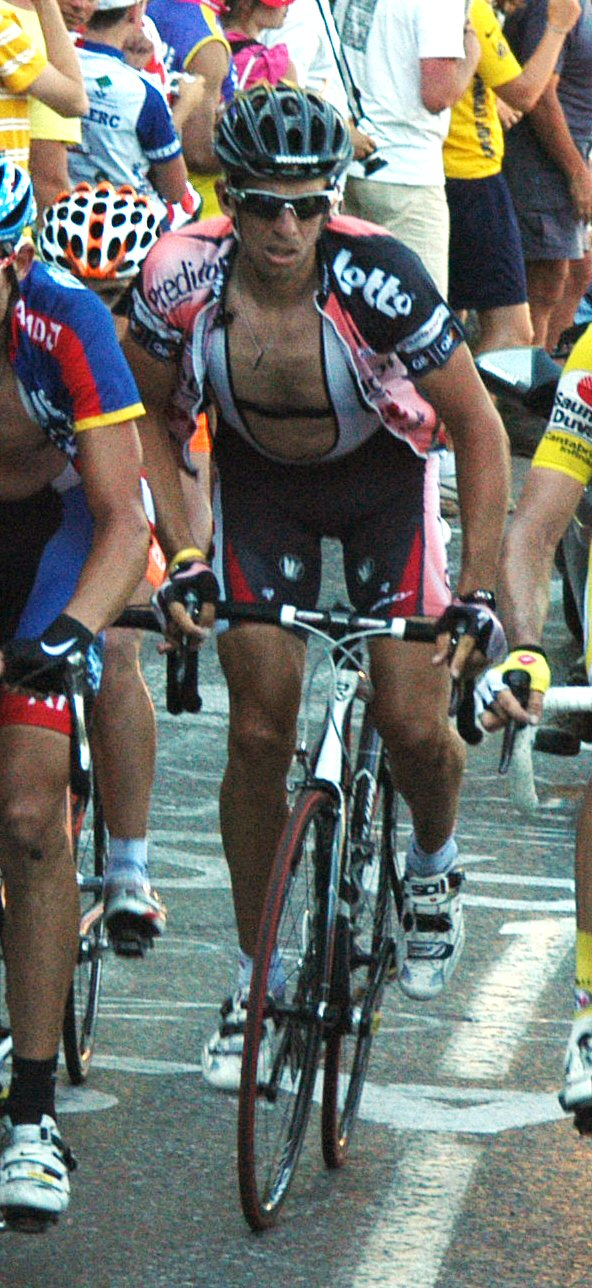
- Cioni at the 2007 Tour de France

Personal information
- Full name: Dario David Cioni
- Born: 2 December 1974 (age 51) Reading, England, United Kingdom

Cycling career
- Sport: Cycling
- Current team: Netcompany–Ineos
- Role: Public Relations; Directeur sportif Rider (retired)
- Rider type: Time Trialist, Climber

Professional teams
- 1992–2000: Mapei mountainbike teams
- 2000–2002: Mapei–Quick-Step
- 2003–2004: Fassa Bortolo
- 2005–2006: Liquigas–Bianchi
- 2007–2008: Predictor–Lotto
- 2009: ISD
- 2010–2011: Team Sky

Major wins
- Settimana Ciclistica Internazionale Coppi-Bartali, 2 Stages; National Time Trial Champion (2004)

Dario David Cioni (born 2 December 1974) is a retired English-born Italian professional road bicycle racer.

== Career ==
=== Mountain bike career ===
Cioni began his career as a professional mountain bike racer at the age of 19. He found success early with victory in the Italian Winter Championship and second place at both the Italian Cup and Italian Championships. Selected to represent Italy at the World Championships, Cioni finished tenth. He continued with similar results through his mountain bike career, with several top five placings at World Cup events including second at St. Wendel in 1996. Cioni also rode some Cyclo-cross towards the end of the nineties.

=== Road racing career ===
In 2000, Cioni was selected for the Mapei–Quick-Step team, alongside, amongst others, Filippo Pozzato, Fabian Cancellara, Michael Rogers and Charlie Wegelius. His intention was to use the training on the road to help his mountain bike career with the specific aim of riding for Italy at the 2000 Summer Olympics. However, he was not selected for the Olympics and it was at this point that Cioni decided to concentrate on road racing. In his first season, Cioni won a stage of the Tour of Slovenia and was second in a stage of the Tour de Normandie. He also rode his first Vuelta a España. In 2001, Cioni won his first stage race, the Vuelta Minho in Portugal. Cioni moved to Fassa Bortolo in 2003, where he was used as a domestique for Alessandro Petacchi. Whilst Petacchi flourished that season, Cioni had no notable results.

It was in 2004 that Cioni made his breakthrough in sustaining his abilities in time trialing and climbing through important stage races. After a promising Tour de Romandie, where he finished fifth overall, Cioni finished fourth in the Giro d'Italia and followed this up with third place in the Tour de Suisse. Cioni was subsequently chosen to represent Italy at the World Cycling Championships, however, was not allowed to complete when he registered a hematocrit level over 50%. Although Cioni was aware his hematocrit level was naturally high, he had failed to get an exemption and personal level from the Italian federation in 1999, since his level was not consistently higher than 50%, but consistently around it. The UCI awarded Cioni an exemption certificate, with a personal level, after further tests in October 2004. In 2005, Cioni moved to the newly formed Liquigas–Bianchi team where, despite being one of the team's leaders and hence liberated from the role of domestique, he had no notable successes. The best that Cioni achieved at Liquigas was a second place in stage four in the 2005 Giro d'Italia, third place at the 2005 Italian National time trial championships and sixth place overall at the 2006 Tour de Romandie. In 2007, Cioni moved to the Belgian ProTour team Predictor–Lotto. His first victory with this team came when he won the first stage of that year's Vuelta a Andalucía, outsprinting his breakaway companion Antón Luengo.

In 2011 he announced his retirement from racing, and moved into a public relations role with his final pro team, Team Sky. He was also appointed as a member of the inaugural UCI Athletes' Commission in 2011. He originally served as a business manager with the team, combining the role with work as a press officer. He switched roles and became one of the team's directeurs sportifs in 2014.

== Personal life ==
He currently lives in Montelupo Fiorentino, Tuscany, with his wife. In 2004, Cioni graduated from the European School of Economics with an honours degree in International Business with specialisation in Sports Management.

== Major results ==
2004
1st National Time Trial Champion
3rd Overall Tour de Suisse
4th Overall Giro d'Italia
5th Overall Tour de Romandie
2005
13th Overall Giro d'Italia
2006
6th Overall Tour de Romandie
2007
1st Stage 1 part b TTT Settimana Ciclistica Internazionale Coppi-Bartali
2nd Overall Vuelta a Andalucía

1st Stage 1

2008
2nd Firenze Pistoia
2009
1st Stage 1 part b TTT Settimana Ciclistica Internazionale Coppi-Bartali
3rd Firenze Pistoia
4th Overall Tour of Slovenia
4th Overall Vuelta Chihuahua International
2011
7th Overall, Vuelta a Castilla y León
