= Raffaele Illiano =

Italian cyclist

Personal information
- Full name: Raffaele Illiano
- Born: February 11, 1977 (age 49) Naples, Italy

Cycling career
- Sport: Cycling
- Discipline: Road
- Role: Rider

Professional teams
- 2002–2006: Colombia-Selle Italia
- 2007: Ceramica Flaminia
- 2008–2009: Serramenti Diquigiovanni
- 2010: Aktio Group Mostostal Puławy

Raffaele Illiano (born February 11, 1977, in Naples) is an Italian professional road racing cyclist.

== Palmares ==
2003
1st, Giro del Lago Maggiore
Tour du Sénégal, 2 stages
2004
1st, GP Bradlo
1st on 6 and 8 stages Tour'd Sénégal
Win Prolog Tour'd Senegal
Classifica Intergiro del Giro d'Italia
2008
1st, Stage 2, Tirreno–Adriatico

== After retirement ==
Raffaele Illiano was arrested on 30 August 2011 for his involvement in a doping scandal.
