= Fabio Sacchi =

Italian cyclist

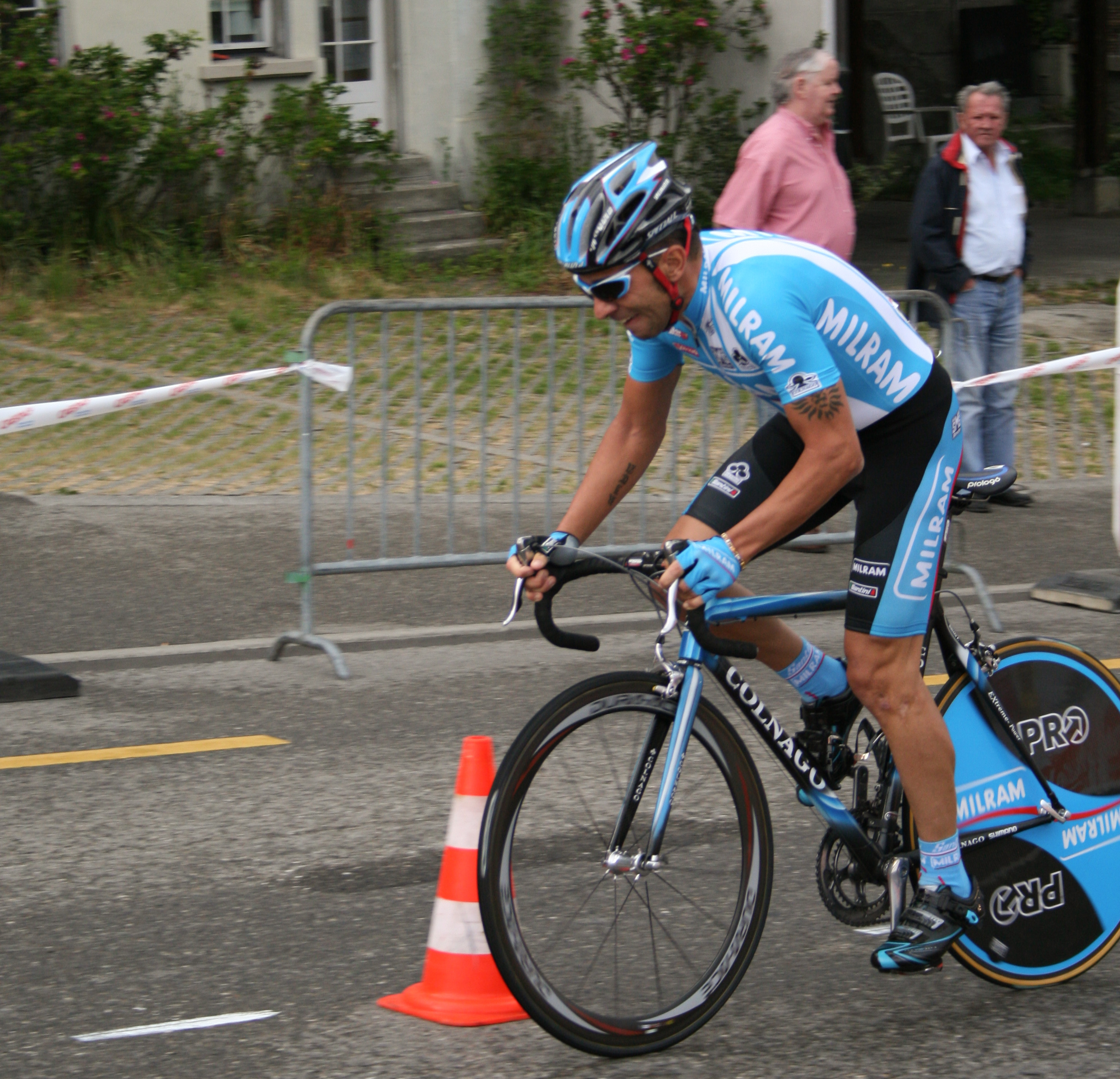
- Sacchi at the 2007 Tour de Romandie

Personal information
- Full name: Fabio Sacchi
- Born: 23 May 1974 (age 52) Milan, Italy

Cycling career
- Sport: Cycling
- Discipline: Road
- Role: Rider

Amateur team
- 1996: Team Polti (stagiaire)

Professional teams
- 1997–2000: Team Polti
- 2001–2003: Saeco
- 2004–2005: Fassa Bortolo
- 2006–2007: Team Milram
- 2008: Preti Mangimi

Fabio Sacchi (born 23 May 1974 in Milan) is an Italian former professional road bicycle racer who raced for the Team Polti, Saeco, Fassa Bortolo, Team Milram and Preti Mangimi teams.

His name was on the list of doping tests published by the French Senate on 24 July 2013 that were collected during the 1998 Tour de France and found positive for EPO when retested in 2004.

== Major results ==
- Trofeo Città di Borgomanero (2006-with Marco Velo)
- Milano–Torino (2005)
- Volta a Portugal - 1 stage (2004)
- Giro di Romagna (2003)
- Tour Down Under - 1 stage (2001–2003)
- Trofeo Città di Castelfidardo (2002)
- Vuelta a Murcia - 2 stages (2002)
- Gran Premio della Costa Etruschi (2001)
- Coppa Bernocchi (1998)
