= Marco Zanotti (cyclist, born 1974) =

Italian cyclist

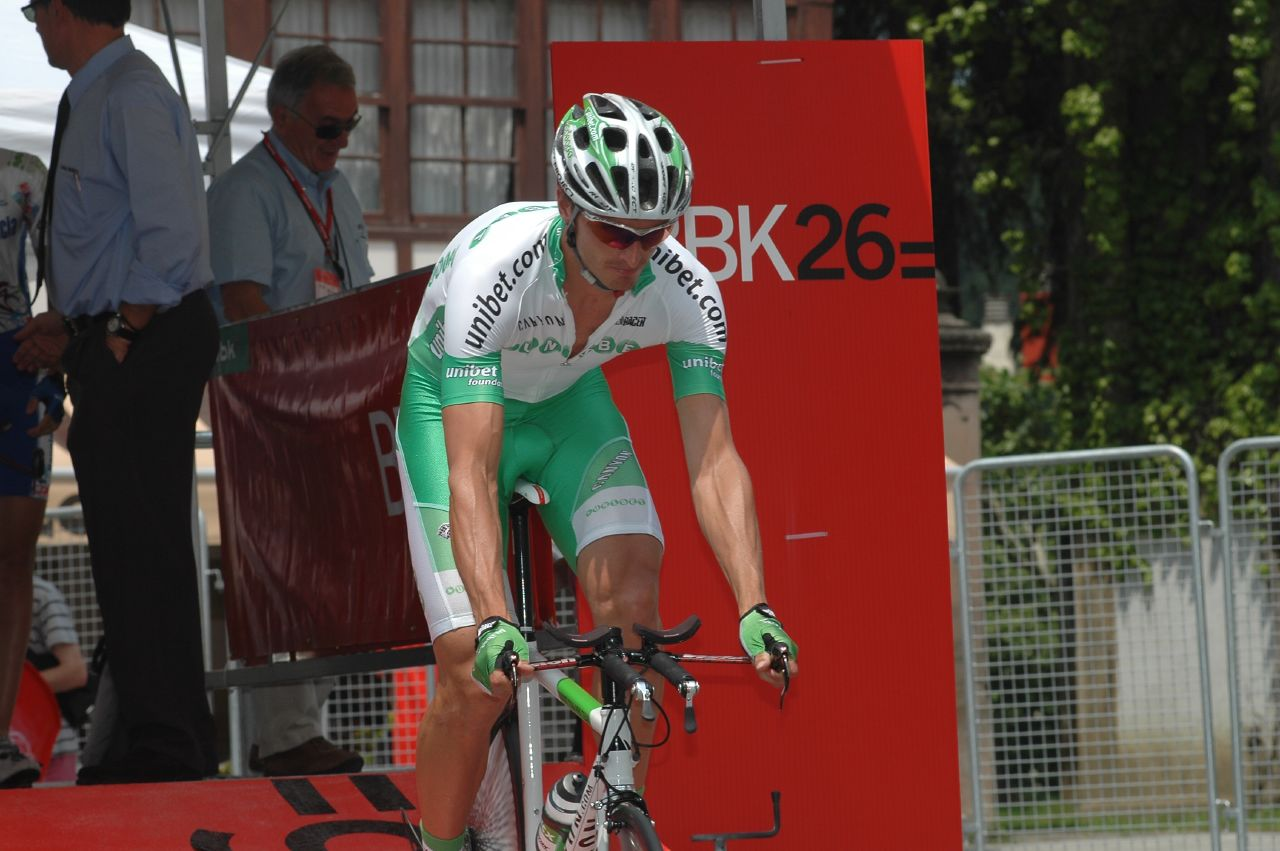

Personal information
- Full name: Marco Zanotti
- Born: 21 January 1974 (age 52) Rovato, Italy

Cycling career
- Sport: Cycling
- Discipline: Road
- Role: Rider

Professional teams
- 1997: Aki–Safi
- 1998: Vini Caldirola
- 2000–2001: Liquigas–Pata
- 2002–2003: Fassa Bortolo
- 2004: Vini Caldirola–Nobili Rubinetterie
- 2005: Liquigas–Bianchi
- 2006–2007: Unibet.com
- 2008: Preti Mangimi

Major wins
- Circuit Franco-Belge (2005)

Marco Zanotti (born 21 January 1974 in Rovato) is a road bicycle racer from Italy, who was a professional rider from 1997 to 2008, with the exception of the year 1999. Zanotti most recently rodes for the UCI Professional Continental team Preti Mangimi.
