= Alejandro Borrajo =

Argentine Road bicycle racer

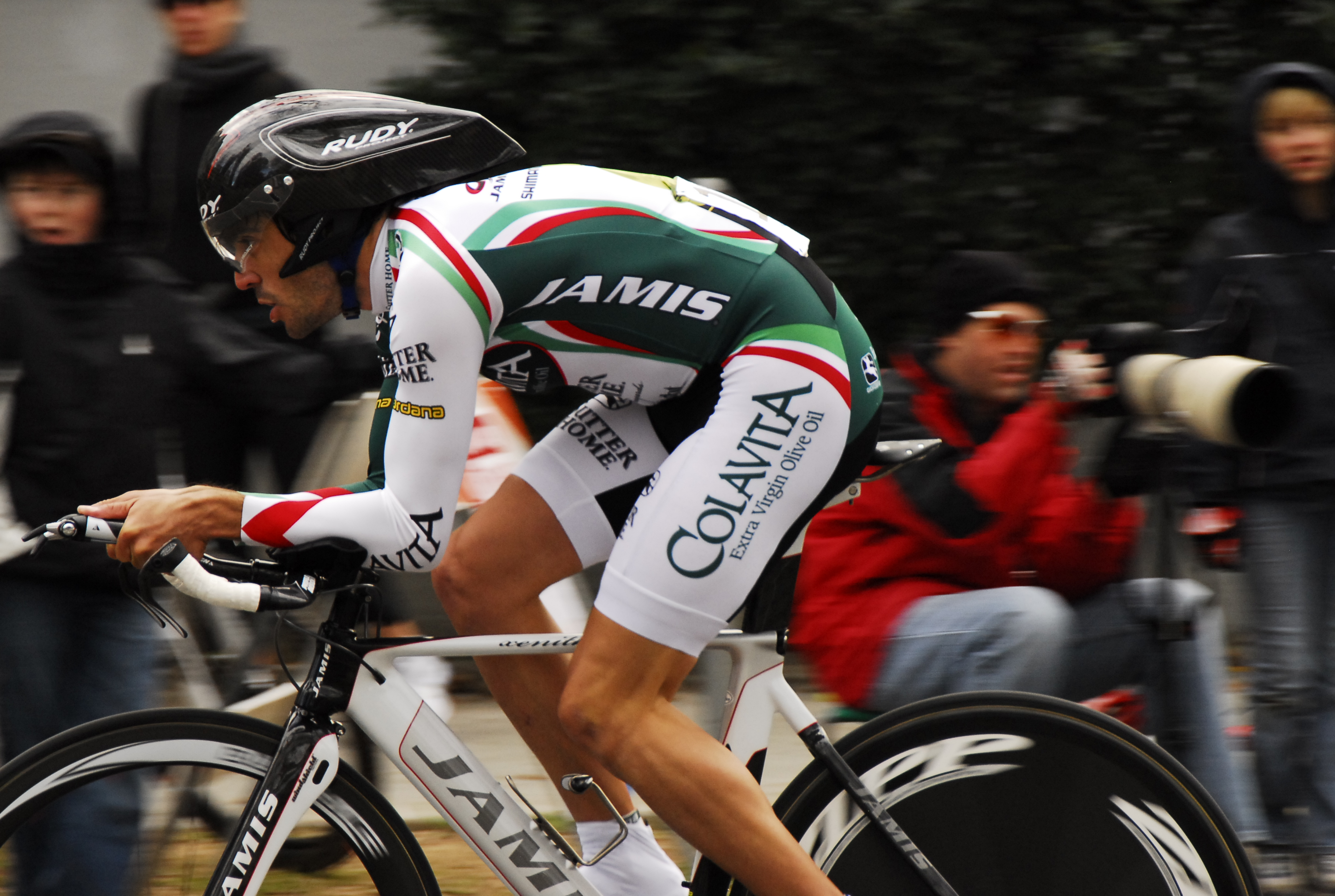
- Borrajo at the 2009 Tour of California

Personal information
- Full name: Alejandro Alberto Borrajo
- Born: April 24, 1980 (age 46) Viedma, Río Negro, Argentina

Cycling career
- Sport: Cycling
- Discipline: Road
- Role: Rider
- Rider type: Sprinter

Professional teams
- 2003: Panaria-Fiordo
- 2004–2005: Ceramica Panaria–Margres
- 2006: Miche
- 2007: Rite Aid
- 2008–2012: Colavita–Sutter Home

Major wins
- (gold) 2006 South American Games

Alejandro Alberto Borrajo (born 24 April 1980 in Viedma, Río Negro) is an Argentine professional road racing cyclist. His other brother, Armando Borrajo, committed suicide on December 18, 2010, having been kidnapped for two days. Alejandro broke his arm, trying to intervene.

== Career highlights ==
2000
1st Overall, Vuelta al Valle
2002
1st, Mendoza–San Juan
2nd, National Under-23 Road Race Championships
2nd, National Under-23 Time Trial Championships
2005
1st, Doble Difunta Corréa
2nd, National Road Race Championships
2nd, Eschborn-Frankfurt City Loop
2nd, Trofeo Città di Brescia – Memorial Rino Fiori
2006
1st (gold) South American Games
2nd, GP Campagnolo
3rd Overall, Giro del Sol San Juan
2007
1st, Stages 1b & 3, Tour of Virginia
2nd, National Road Race Championships
2nd Overall, Vuelta Leandro N. Alem
2nd, Reading Classic
2nd, Doble Difunta Corréa
3rd Overall, Fitchburg Longsjo Classic

1st, Stage 2

3rd, US Cycling Open
2008
1st, Stage 1, McLane Pacific Classic
1st, Stage 2, San Dimas Stage Race
1st, Stage 4, Redlands Bicycle Classic
2009
1st CSC Invitational
1st, Stage 3, Nature Valley Grand Prix
7th, Philadelphia International Championship
2010
1st, Stage 2, Rutas de América
1st, Stage 3, Redlands Bicycle Classic
1st, Stage 1, Fitchburg Longsjo Classic
1st, Stage 4b, Volta de Ciclismo Internacional do Estado de São Paulo
4th Overall, GP Esco

1st, Stages 1 & 4

4th, Philadelphia International Championship
2011
1st Overall, Tulsa Tough

1st, Stage 3

2012
1st, Stage 4, Tour of the Gila
