= Yaroslav Popovych =

Ukrainian cyclist

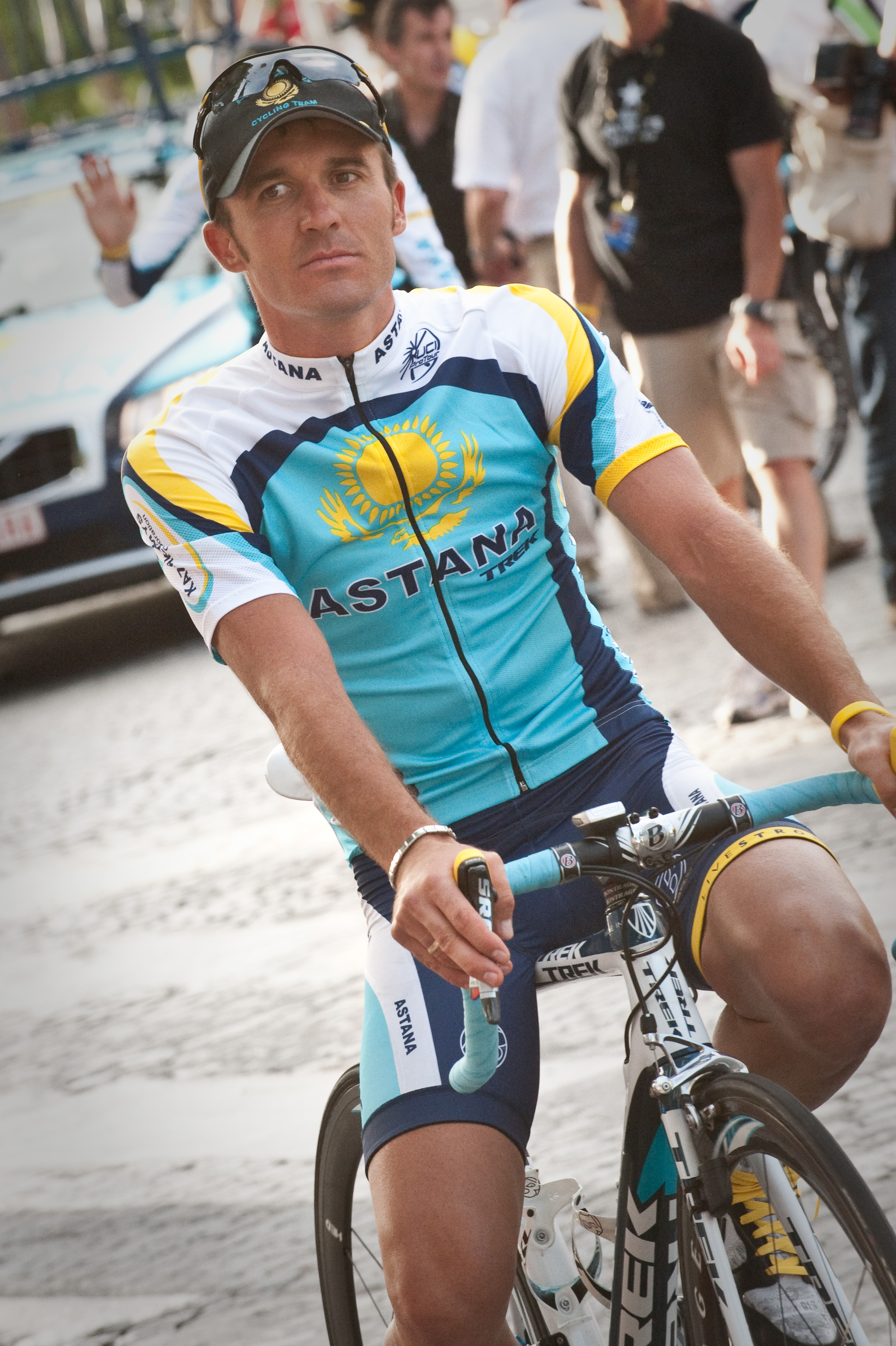
- Popovych at the 2009 Tour de France

Personal information
- Full name: Yaroslav Popovych
- Born: 4 January 1980 (age 46) Drohobych, Ukrainian SSR, Soviet Union
- Height: 1.75 m (5 ft 9 in)
- Weight: 66 kg (146 lb; 10.4 st)

Cycling career
- Sport: Cycling
- Current team: Lidl–Trek
- Discipline: Road
- Role: Rider (retired); Directeur sportif
- Rider type: All-rounder

Professional teams
- 2002–2004: Landbouwkrediet–Colnago
- 2005–2007: Discovery Channel
- 2008: Silence–Lotto
- 2009: Astana
- 2010–2011: Team RadioShack
- 2012–2016: RadioShack–Nissan

Managerial team
- 2016–: Trek–Segafredo

Major wins
- Grand Tours Tour de France Young rider classification (2005) 1 individual stage (2006) 2 TTT stages (2005, 2009) Stage races Volta a Catalunya (2005)
Medal record
Representing Ukraine
Men's road bicycle racing
UCI Road World Championships
Gold medal – first place	2001 Lisbon	Under-23 road race
Silver medal – second place	2000 Plouay	Under-23 road race

Yaroslav Popovych (Ukrainian: Ярослав Попович; born 4 January 1980) is a Ukrainian former professional cyclist, who rode professionally between 2002 and 2016.

The winner of the under-23 road race at the 2001 UCI Road World Championships, Popovych turned professional in 2002 with Landbouwkrediet–Colnago, where he performed particularly strongly in the Giro d'Italia, finishing third in 2003. Upon joining Discovery Channel in 2005, his focus switched to the Tour de France, where he won the young riders' classification in 2005 and won stage 12 in 2006. When Discovery Channel folded at the end of 2007, Popovych moved to Silence–Lotto in 2008 and on to Astana in 2009. Popovych also raced for Team RadioShack in 2010 and 2011. From 2012 until 2016 he rode with the UCI ProTour team Trek–Segafredo.

== Career ==
=== Early years ===
Popovych was born in Drohobych, Ukrainian SSR, Soviet Union. He was considered one of the most promising cyclists while riding in junior and under-23 races after catching 35 victories in 2000 and 2001. He won the Under-23 Men's road race in the 2001 UCI Road World Championships after finishing second the previous year. He also won the Paris–Roubaix edition for under-23 riders and palio del recioto. The Ukrainian turned pro in 2002 by joining the Belgian team Landbouwkrediet–Colnago and delivered some strong showings, most notably in the Giro d'Italia where he finished third in 2003 and fifth in 2004, when he wore the pink jersey during three stages.

=== Discovery Channel Pro Cycling Team (2005–07) ===
He joined the Discovery Channel in 2005 and he was considered as a possible successor to Lance Armstrong as team leader. In this same year, Popovych took one of his best victories by winning the Volta a Catalunya, which is an important race before the Tour de France. Along with the rest of the Discovery team, he won stage four team time trial in the Tour de France and showed his potential by winning the young rider classification, while helping Armstrong win his seventh Tour de France at the time.

In the 2006 Tour de France, Popovych was considered one of the Discovery Channel team's four leaders, along with José Azevedo, Paolo Savoldelli and George Hincapie. After failing to be among the best for the overall classification in the Pyrenees mountain stages, Popovych won stage 12 by repeatedly attacking his fellow break-away compatriots Alessandro Ballan, Óscar Freire and Christophe Le Mével. During 2006 season he also won stages at the Vuelta a Castilla y León and Tour de Georgia, where he finished third.

Popovych mainly worked as a domestique during 2007 season, aiding Alberto Contador to win Paris–Nice and the Tour de France. Early in the season, he won the fifth stage in Paris–Nice after attacking 33 kilometres (21 miles) from the finishing line. He was considered as the team leader for the Giro d'Italia, but he withdrew in the twelfth stage after suffering two crashes in the race. In the Tour de France, he finished eighth while working for Discovery Channel team-mates Contador and Levi Leipheimer.

=== Silence–Lotto (2008) ===
In 2008, Popovych moved to Silence–Lotto squad after Discovery Channel announced that it would cease operations at the end of 2007.

Popovych was recruited as a domestique member of the Tour de France team primarily to support lead rider Cadel Evans, but had a rather disappointing year, with only a 3rd place in Paris–Nice to show for. At the end of the year, it was announced he would team up with his former Discovery manager Johan Bruyneel again in 2009, joining the new Astana team.

=== Astana (2009) ===
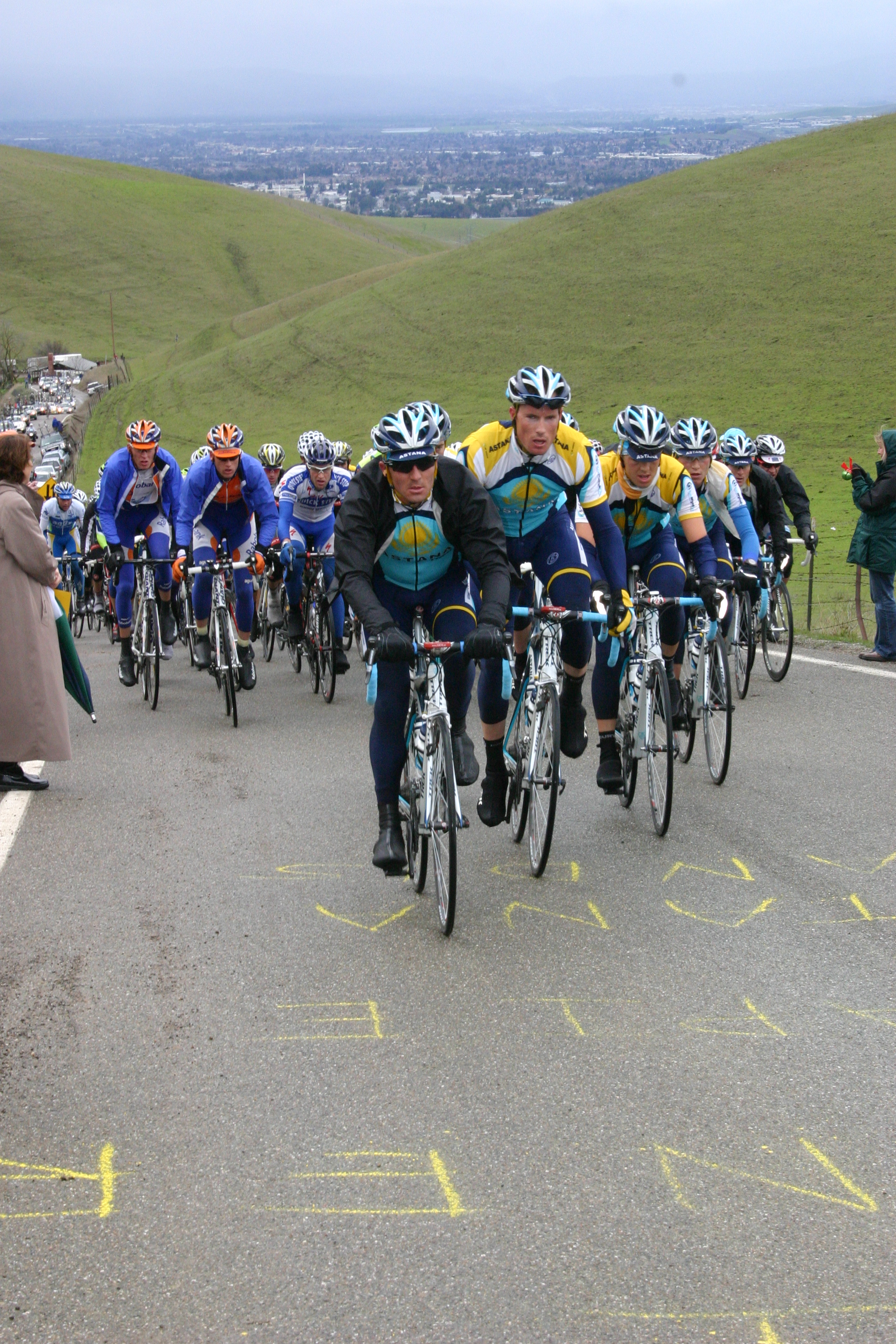
Popovych leads the Astana team in the chase over Patterson Pass during Stage 3 of the 2009 Tour of California.

In 2009, Popovych and Armstrong joined the Kazakh-based cycling squad Astana, where many other former Discovery Channel riders and staff were also under contract. Popovych acted as a domestique for Contador in Paris–Nice, finishing 23rd himself.

On 15 October 2009 it was reported that Popovych would move to Team RadioShack for the 2010 season.

=== Team RadioShack (2010) ===
In 2010 Popovych followed many former Astana riders to the newly created American based squad Team RadioShack.

=== Doping allegations ===
In January 2011 Popovych was incriminated in the Floyd Landis doping allegations against the U.S. Postal Service cycling team, after Sports Illustrated magazine reported that in November 2010 his property in Tuscany had been searched by Federal Officials who discovered drug testing documents, medical supplies and performance-enhancing drugs as well as evidence of links to controversial Italian physician Michele Ferrari. Later that day Popovych denied the allegations.

== Major results ==
2000
1st Overall Tour de Nouvelle-Calédonie
1st Gran Premio di Poggiana
2nd Road race, UCI Under-23 Road World Championships
2nd Giro del Belvedere
2nd Coppa Città di Asti
3rd Piccolo Giro di Lombardia
10th Trofeo Alcide Degasperi
2001
1st Road race, UCI Under-23 Road World Championships
1st Trofeo Banca Popolare di Vicenza
1st Giro del Belvedere
1st Gran Premio Palio del Recioto
1st Paris–Roubaix Espoirs
2nd Overall Grand Prix Guillaume Tell
2nd Gran Premio della Liberazione
2nd Trofeo Alcide Degasperi
4th GP Open Campania
9th GP Città di Napoli
2002
1st Poreč Trophy II
1st GP de Genève
3rd Poreč Trophy III
4th Overall Brixia Tour
4th Gran Premio Fred Mengoni
5th Poreč Trophy I
6th Overall Tour de Wallonie
9th Overall Tour de l'Avenir
10th Tre Valli Varesine
2003
3rd Overall Giro d'Italia
3rd Overall Tour de Wallonie
5th Overall Settimana Internazionale di Coppi e Bartali
6th Coppa Ugo Agostoni
7th Overall Tour de Romandie
7th Giro della Provincia di Lucca
9th Overall Giro della Liguria
10th Giro dell'Emilia
2004
1st Trofeo Androni Giocattoli
5th Overall Giro d'Italia

Held Maglia Rosa for Stages 13–16

8th Overall Regio-Tour
9th Overall Tour of Austria
10th Firenze–Pistoia
2005
1st Overall Volta a Catalunya
4th LuK Challenge Chrono (with Paolo Savoldelli)
Tour de France

1st Young rider classification
1st Stage 4 (TTT)

2006
1st Stage 12 Tour de France
1st Stage 2 (ITT) Vuelta a Castilla y León
3rd Overall Tour de Georgia

1st Stage 2

4th GP Ouest–France
2007
1st Stage 5 Paris–Nice
8th Overall Tour de France

Stage 9 Combativity award

2008
3rd Overall Paris–Nice
2009
1st Stage 4 (TTT) Tour de France
2013
9th Gent–Wevelgem

=== Grand Tour general classification results timeline ===
Grand Tour	2002	2003	2004	2005	2006	2007	2008	2009	2010	2011	2012	2013	2014	2015
Giro d'Italia	12	3	5	—	—	DNF	—	15	—	63	—	133	—	—
Tour de France	—	—	—	12	25	8	24	41	85	DNF	76	—	—	—
Vuelta a España	—	—	—	—	—	—	52	—	—	—	—	85	115	132

Legend
—	Did not compete
DNF	Did not finish
