= Crescenzo D'Amore =

Italian cyclist (1979–2024)

Personal information
- Born: 2 April 1979 Naples, Italy
- Died: 1 December 2024 (aged 45) Pomigliano d'Arco, Italy

Cycling career
- Sport: Cycling
- Discipline: Road
- Role: Rider
- Rider type: Sprinter

Professional teams
- 2000–2001: Mapei–Quick-Step
- 2002: Cage Maglierie–Olmo
- 2003: Tenax
- 2004–2006: Acqua & Sapone
- 2007: OTC Doors–Lauretana
- 2011 (until 15/04): Androni Giocattoli

Crescenzo D'Amore (2 April 1979 – 1 December 2024) was an Italian road cyclist.

D'Amore died in a traffic collision in Pomigliano d'Arco, on 1 December 2024, at the age of 45.

== Major results ==
1997
1st Road race, UCI Junior Road World Championships
2000
1st Stage 3 Vuelta a la Argentina
3rd Poreč Trophy
7th G.P. Costa degli Etruschi
8th Giro di Campania
2004
1st Stage 3 Settimana Internazionale di Coppi e Bartali
3rd G.P. Costa degli Etruschi
5th GP de la Ville de Rennes
2005
8th G.P. Costa degli Etruschi
2006
7th Coppa Bernocchi
2007
6th G.P. Costa degli Etruschi
