= 2002 Tour de France, Prologue to Stage 10 =

Cycling race stages

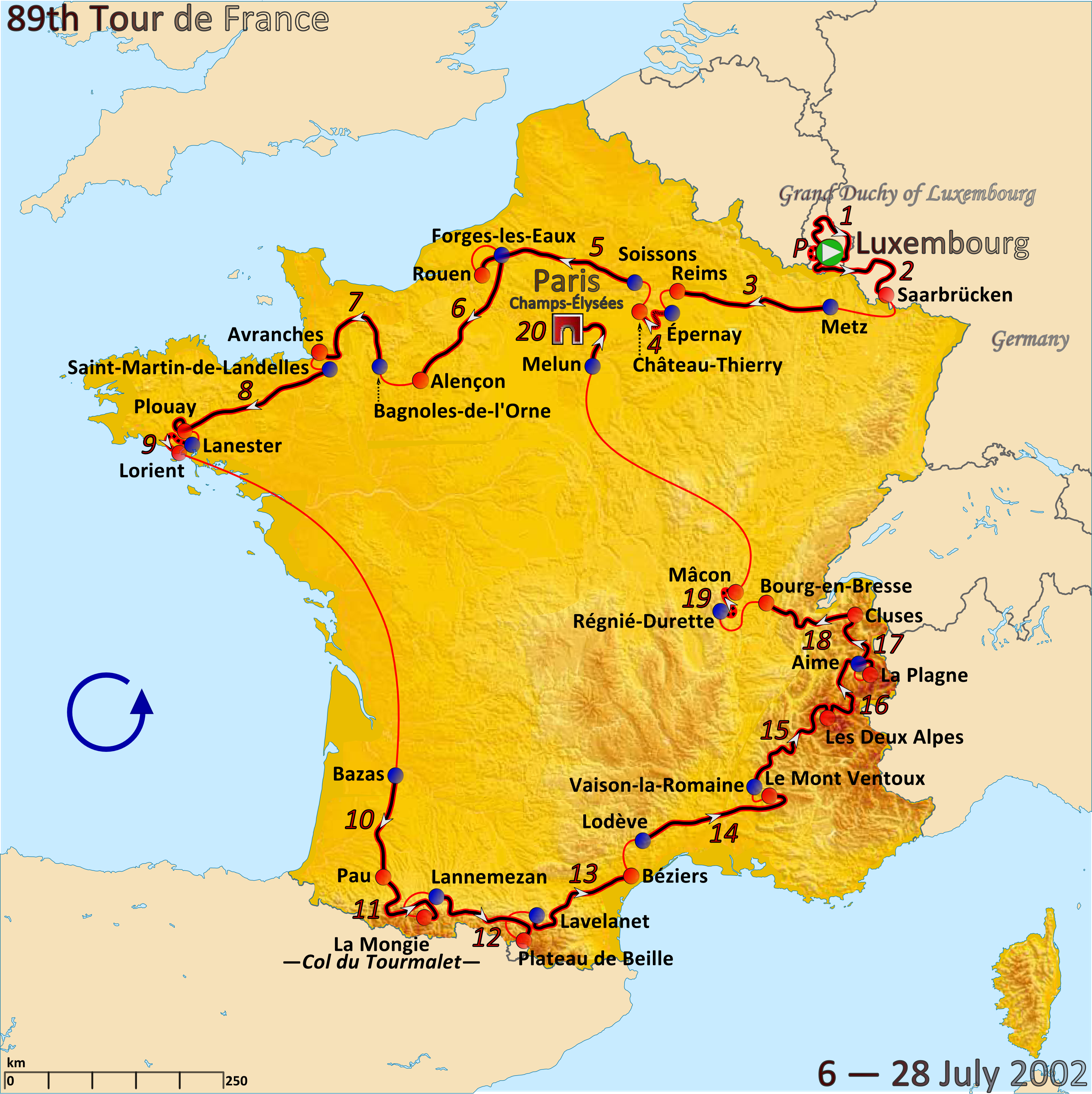
Route of the 2002 Tour de France

The 2002 Tour de France was the 89th edition of Tour de France, one of cycling's Grand Tours. The Tour began in Luxembourg City with a prologue individual time trial on 6 July and Stage 10 occurred on 17 July with a flat stage to Pau. The race finished on the Champs-Élysées in Paris on 28 July.

== Prologue ==
6 July 2002 — Luxembourg, 7 km (4.3 mi) (individual time trial)

As usual, the Tour started with a prologue, a short individual time trial, this time one of 7 km in Luxembourg. Armstrong won, which was not a surprise, since he was known as a very good time trialist. What was a surprise, was the second place of Frenchman Laurent Jalabert. Of the favourites, Moreau had a disappointing race, ending only 40th, 24 seconds behind Armstrong.

Prologue result and general classification after prologue
Rank	Rider	Team	Time
~~1~~	~~Lance Armstrong (USA)~~	~~U.S. Postal Service~~	~~9' 08"~~
2	Laurent Jalabert (FRA)	CSC–Tiscali	+ 2"
3	Raimondas Rumšas (LTU)	Lampre–Daikin	+ 3"
4	Santiago Botero (COL)	Kelme–Costa Blanca	+ 4"
5	David Millar (GBR)	Cofidis	+ 5"
6	Laurent Brochard (FRA)	Jean Delatour	+ 6"
7	Dario Frigo (ITA)	Tacconi Sport	+ 8"
8	Igor González de Galdeano (ESP)	ONCE–Eroski	+ 9"
9	Joseba Beloki (ESP)	ONCE–Eroski	+ 13"
10	László Bodrogi (HUN)	Mapei–Quick-Step	s.t.

Note: Laurent Jalabert got to wear the green jersey, as a rider cannot wear two leading jerseys at the same time.

== Stage 1 ==
7 July 2002 — Luxembourg to Luxembourg, 192.5 km (119.6 mi)

German sprinter Erik Zabel had his birthday today. He had good hopes of winning both the stage and the yellow jersey: He was 25 seconds behind Armstrong in the general classification, but winning the first intermediate sprint gained him 6 seconds, and winning the stage would have gained an extra 20 seconds bonus. If Zabel would not succeed, Jalabert would have had his chance: A third place in the first bonus sprint gained him 2 seconds, just enough to take the yellow.

However, either man could easily lose the yellow if an attacker would end before the peloton. Stéphane Berges, Christophe Mengin and Ludo Dierckxsens gave it a try, and had a maximum lead of 4'10". However, the peloton caught them back, and on a short but difficult climb another group with important riders like Armstrong and Botero got away. They were caught back as well, but Moreau lost contact with the peloton during the chase.

After yet another attack, the peloton came in full to the finish, Zabel's Telekom team preparing what they hoped would be a win for their leader. However, 1 km before the finish the unknown Swiss rider Rubens Bertogliati attacked, and surprisingly was able to hold out until the finish. Zabel won the spurt of the peloton, but Bertogliati gained both the stage and the yellow jersey. Moreau's poor start continued, he crashed twice and lost 3'20", and his chances seem over.

Stage 1 result

Rank	Rider	Team	Time
1	Rubens Bertogliati (SUI)	Lampre–Daikin	4h 49' 16"
2	Erik Zabel (GER)	Team Telekom	s.t.
3	Robbie McEwen (AUS)	Lotto–Adecco	s.t.
4	Fabio Baldato (ITA)	Fassa Bortolo	s.t.
5	Óscar Freire (ESP)	Mapei–Quick-Step	s.t.
6	Stuart O'Grady (AUS)	Crédit Agricole	s.t.
7	Laurent Brochard (FRA)	Jean Delatour	s.t.
8	Dario Frigo (ITA)	Tacconi Sport	s.t.
9	José Enrique Gutiérrez (ESP)	Kelme–Costa Blanca	s.t.
10	François Simon (FRA)	Bonjour (FRA)	s.t.

General classification after stage 1

Rank	Rider	Team	Time
1	Rubens Bertogliati (SUI)	Lampre–Daikin	4h 58' 21"
2	Laurent Jalabert (FRA)	CSC–Tiscali	+ 3"
3	Lance Armstrong (USA)	U.S. Postal Service	+ 3"
4	Raimondas Rumšas (LTU)	Lampre–Daikin	+ 6"
5	Santiago Botero (COL)	Kelme–Costa Blanca	+ 7"
6	David Millar (GBR)	Cofidis	+ 8"
7	Laurent Brochard (FRA)	Jean Delatour	+ 9"
8	Erik Zabel (GER)	Team Telekom	+ 10"
9	Dario Frigo (ITA)	Tacconi Sport	+ 11"
10	Igor González de Galdeano (ESP)	ONCE–Eroski	+ 12"

Note: David Millar got to wear the white jersey, as a rider cannot wear two leading jerseys at the same time.

== Stage 2 ==
8 July 2002 — Luxembourg to Saarbrücken, 181 km (112.5 mi)

Stage 2 result

Rank	Rider	Team	Time
1	Óscar Freire (ESP)	Mapei–Quick-Step	4h 19' 51"
2	Robbie McEwen (AUS)	Lotto–Adecco	s.t.
3	Erik Zabel (GER)	Team Telekom	s.t.
4	Baden Cooke (AUS)	Française des Jeux	s.t.
5	Jaan Kirsipuu (EST)	AG2R Prévoyance	s.t.
6	Andrej Hauptman (SLO)	Tacconi Sport	s.t.
7	Pedro Horrillo (ESP)	Mapei–Quick-Step	s.t.
8	Fred Rodriguez (USA)	Domo-Farm Frites	s.t.
9	Gian Matteo Fagnini (ITA)	Team Telekom	s.t.
10	Stuart O'Grady (AUS)	Crédit Agricole	s.t.

General classification after stage 2

Rank	Rider	Team	Time
1	Rubens Bertogliati (SUI)	Lampre–Daikin	9h 18' 12"
2	Erik Zabel (GER)	Team Telekom	+ 2"
3	Laurent Jalabert (FRA)	CSC–Tiscali	+ 3"
~~4~~	~~Lance Armstrong (USA)~~	~~U.S. Postal Service~~	~~s.t.~~
5	Raimondas Rumšas (LTU)	Lampre–Daikin	+ 6"
6	Santiago Botero (COL)	Kelme–Costa Blanca	+ 7"
7	David Millar (GBR)	Cofidis	+ 8"
8	Laurent Brochard (FRA)	Jean Delatour	+ 9"
9	Óscar Freire (ESP)	Mapei–Quick-Step	+ 11"
10	Dario Frigo (ITA)	Tacconi Sport	s.t.

Note: David Millar got to wear the white jersey, as a rider cannot wear two leading jerseys at the same time.

== Stage 3 ==
9 July 2002 — Metz to Reims, 174.5 km (108.4 mi)

Jacky Durand, always known for his attacking style, often riding ahead of the peloton for a large part of the stage, did it again this time. He attacked after 3 km, and got Franck Rénier with him. In the peloton, the third places in the bonus sprints (gaining 2 seconds) were fought. Ján Svorada took the first one before Zabel, protecting the interests of his teammate Bertogliati, but Zabel won the second and third, thus passing Bertogliati in the general classification.

The lead of Durand and Rénier grew to a maximum of 11'10", but combined work by the Telekom (Zabel) and Lotto (McEwen) teams finally led to the two being nevertheless caught back. Hushovd tried to win 'Bertogliati-style', but also failed, and Robbie McEwen showed himself the strongest in the sprint. Zabel was second, but nevertheless very happy, since he took over the yellow jersey. Bertogliati, happy to have worn it for three days, is still not without honour: He now carries the white jersey of the best young rider.

Stage 3 result

Rank	Rider	Team	Time
1	Robbie McEwen (AUS)	Lotto–Adecco	4h 13' 37"
2	Erik Zabel (GER)	Team Telekom	s.t.
3	Baden Cooke (AUS)	Française des Jeux	s.t.
4	Andrej Hauptman (SLO)	Tacconi Sport	s.t.
5	Fabio Baldato (ITA)	Fassa Bortolo	s.t.
6	Paolo Bossoni (ITA)	Tacconi Sport	s.t.
7	Jaan Kirsipuu (EST)	AG2R Prévoyance	s.t.
8	François Simon (FRA)	Bonjour	s.t.
9	Ján Svorada (CZE)	Lampre–Daikin	s.t.
10	Stuart O'Grady (AUS)	Crédit Agricole	s.t.

General classification after stage 3

Rank	Rider	Team	Time
1	Erik Zabel (GER)	Team Telekom	13h 31' 35"
2	Robbie McEwen (AUS)	Lotto–Adecco	+ 8"
3	Rubens Bertogliati (SUI)	Lampre–Daikin	+ 14"
4	Laurent Jalabert (FRA)	CSC–Tiscali	+ 17"
~~5~~	~~Lance Armstrong (USA)~~	~~U.S. Postal Service~~	~~s.t.~~
6	Raimondas Rumšas (LTU)	Lampre–Daikin	+ 20"
7	Santiago Botero (COL)	Kelme–Costa Blanca	+ 21"
8	David Millar (GBR)	Cofidis	+ 22"
9	Laurent Brochard (FRA)	Jean Delatour	+ 23"
10	Óscar Freire (ESP)	Mapei–Quick-Step	+ 25"

Note: Robbie McEwen got to wear the green jersey, as a rider cannot wear two leading jerseys at the same time.

== Stage 4 ==
10 July 2002 — Épernay to Château Thierry, 67.5 km (41.9 mi) (team time trial)

The team time trial had been removed from the Tour some years earlier, but in 2001 it had been re-instated. This year's team time trial looked like it was going to be won by CSC Tiscali (Jalabert) in a close fight with ONCE (Beloki, González de Galdeano), with US Postal (Armstrong) not far behind. However, the CSC Tiscali team had to wait when Sandstød had a puncture, and because of that fell to third place. In the general classification the result brought a large change, the first 14 places now being taken by ONCE and US Postal riders, with Igor González de Galdeano in the yellow. Several of the main riders from the other teams already are over 2 minutes behind González de Galdeano, Beloki and Armstrong.

Stage 4 result

Rank	Team	Time
1	ONCE–Eroski	1h 19' 49"
2	U.S. Postal Service	+ 16"
3	CSC–Tiscali	+ 46"
4	Fassa Bortolo	+ 1' 30"
5	Cofidis	+ 1' 44"
6	iBanesto.com	+ 1' 56"
7	Domo-Farm Frites	+ 2' 12"
8	Rabobank	+ 2' 16"
9	Kelme–Costa Blanca	+ 2' 19"
10	Lampre–Daikin	+ 2' 22"

General classification after stage 4

Rank	Rider	Team	Time
1	Igor González de Galdeano (ESP)	ONCE–Eroski	14h 51' 50"
2	Joseba Beloki (ESP)	ONCE–Eroski	+ 4"
~~3~~	~~Lance Armstrong (USA)~~	~~U.S. Postal Service~~	~~+ 7"~~
4	Jörg Jaksche (GER)	ONCE–Eroski	+ 12"
5	Abraham Olano (ESP)	ONCE–Eroski	+ 22"
6	Roberto Heras (ESP)	U.S. Postal Service	+ 25"
7	Isidro Nozal (ESP)	ONCE–Eroski	+ 27"
8	José Azevedo (POR)	ONCE–Eroski	+ 28"
9	George Hincapie (USA)	U.S. Postal Service	+ 28"
10	Marcos-Antonio Serrano (ESP)	ONCE–Eroski	+ 30"

== Stage 5 ==
11 July 2002 — Soissons to Rouen, 195 km (121.2 mi)

Several attacks were made in the early part of the race, but none of these lasted very long until Jaan Kirsipuu, Christophe Edaleine, Stefano Casagranda, Michael Sandstød and Ludo Dierckxsens escaped 85 km from the finish. The ONCE team of yellow jersey González de Galdeano led the peloton, but did not make attempts to catch the five back, since they were enough behind in the general classification (over 4 minutes) not to threaten González de Galdeano. This changed when the teams of the sprinters (with the notable exception of Zabel's Telekom team) took over the lead. However, they came too late, and the five got to sprint for the stage win. Kirsipuu showed that he was by far the best sprinter among them, and took the stage. Another sprinter, Belgian's Tom Steels was less lucky and was the first to abandon this year, Marco Pinotti also abandoned on this stage. McEwen won the sprint for sixth place, but Zabel's ninth place gave him just enough points to keep the green jersey.

Stage 5 result

Rank	Rider	Team	Time
1	Jaan Kirsipuu (EST)	AG2R Prévoyance	4h 13' 33"
2	Michael Sandstød (DEN)	CSC–Tiscali	s.t.
3	Ludo Dierckxsens (BEL)	Lampre–Daikin	s.t.
4	Stefano Casagranda (ITA)	Alessio	+ 3"
5	Christophe Edaleine (FRA)	Jean Delatour	+ 8"
6	Robbie McEwen (AUS)	Lotto–Adecco	+ 33"
7	Baden Cooke (AUS)	Française des Jeux	s.t.
8	Stuart O'Grady (AUS)	Crédit Agricole	s.t.
9	Erik Zabel (GER)	Team Telekom	s.t.
10	Andrej Hauptman (SLO)	Tacconi Sport	s.t.

General classification after stage 5

Rank	Rider	Team	Time
1	Igor González de Galdeano (ESP)	ONCE–Eroski	19h 05' 56"
2	Joseba Beloki (ESP)	ONCE–Eroski	+ 4"
~~3~~	~~Lance Armstrong (USA)~~	~~U.S. Postal Service~~	~~+ 7"~~
4	Jörg Jaksche (GER)	ONCE–Eroski	+ 12"
5	Abraham Olano (ESP)	ONCE–Eroski	+ 22"
6	Roberto Heras (ESP)	U.S. Postal Service	+ 25"
7	Isidro Nozal (ESP)	ONCE–Eroski	+ 27"
8	José Azevedo (POR)	ONCE–Eroski	+ 28"
9	George Hincapie (USA)	U.S. Postal Service	s.t.
10	Marcos-Antonio Serrano (ESP)	ONCE–Eroski	+ 30"

== Stage 6 ==
12 July 2002 — Forges-les-Eaux to Alençon, 199.5 km (124.0 mi)

Many attacks came in the first part of the stage, with Karsten Kroon being found among the attackers several times, but none could stay away for long until Steffen Wesemann, Jacky Durand, Paul Van Hyfte, Emmanuel Magnien, Massimo Apollonio and Constantino Zaballa made the attack. However, they too were caught back about 10 km before the finish, and the Tour saw another mass spurt. This time Erik Zabel, whose Team Telekom did not need to ride behind the escapers since Wesemann is also from his team, won the spurt, before Freire and McEwen. The three are clearly the best sprinters in this year's tour. Alexander Shefer and Rik Verbrugghe gave up today.

Stage 6 result

Rank	Rider	Team	Time
1	Erik Zabel (GER)	Team Telekom	4h 23' 07"
2	Óscar Freire (ESP)	Mapei–Quick-Step	s.t.
3	Robbie McEwen (AUS)	Lotto–Adecco	s.t.
4	Ján Svorada (CZE)	Lampre–Daikin	s.t.
5	Sergei Ivanov (RUS)	Fassa Bortolo	s.t.
6	Baden Cooke (AUS)	Française des Jeux	s.t.
7	Thor Hushovd (NOR)	Crédit Agricole	s.t.
8	Laurent Brochard (FRA)	Jean Delatour	s.t.
9	Arvis Piziks (LAT)	CSC–Tiscali	s.t.
10	Andrej Hauptman (SLO)	Tacconi Sport	s.t.

General classification after stage 6

Rank	Rider	Team	Time
1	Igor González de Galdeano (ESP)	ONCE–Eroski	23h 29' 03"
2	Joseba Beloki (ESP)	ONCE–Eroski	+ 4"
~~3~~	~~Lance Armstrong (USA)~~	~~U.S. Postal Service~~	~~+ 7"~~
4	Jörg Jaksche (GER)	ONCE–Eroski	+ 12"
5	Abraham Olano (ESP)	ONCE–Eroski	+ 22"
6	Roberto Heras (ESP)	U.S. Postal Service	+ 25"
7	Isidro Nozal (ESP)	ONCE–Eroski	+ 27"
8	José Azevedo (POR)	ONCE–Eroski	+ 28"
9	George Hincapie (USA)	U.S. Postal Service	s.t.
10	Marcos-Antonio Serrano (ESP)	ONCE–Eroski	+ 30"

== Stage 7 ==
13 July 2002 — Bagnoles-de-l'Orne to Avranches, 176 km (109.4 mi)

As in the previous stages, many attacks were made in the beginning, and one group finally managed to stay ahead - this time Franck Rénier, Léon van Bon and Antony Morin were the ones to try. However, the teams of the sprinters caught them back again. 1 km before the finish, Pedro Horrillo tried to win the race by a late escape. However, Bradley McGee showed his capacities in uphill sprinting, and overtook Horillo during the final sprint. Horillo, in the end, got third place for his attempt. The last few kilometres were hectic, with several crashes. Among the casualties were Moreau and Freire, finishing far behind, but also Armstrong. With the help of the rest of the US Postal team he diminished his loss, but at the finish he was still 27 seconds behind, dropping him from third to eighth place in the GC, the first 7 places all being taken by ONCE riders. Interesting detail for this stage is that all 4 participating Australians finished in the top-8. Didier Rous did not finish the stage.

Stage 7 result

Rank	Rider	Team	Time
1	Bradley McGee (AUS)	Française des Jeux	4h 10' 56"
2	Jaan Kirsipuu (EST)	AG2R Prévoyance	s.t.
3	Pedro Horrillo (ESP)	Mapei–Quick-Step	s.t.
4	Robbie McEwen (AUS)	Lotto–Adecco	s.t.
5	Erik Zabel (GER)	Team Telekom	s.t.
6	Stuart O'Grady (AUS)	Crédit Agricole	s.t.
7	Ján Svorada (CZE)	Lampre–Daikin	s.t.
8	Baden Cooke (AUS)	Française des Jeux	s.t.
9	Fred Rodriguez (USA)	Domo-Farm Frites	s.t.
10	Thor Hushovd (NOR)	Crédit Agricole	s.t.

General classification after stage 7

Rank	Rider	Team	Time
1	Igor González de Galdeano (ESP)	ONCE–Eroski	27h 39' 59"
2	Joseba Beloki (ESP)	ONCE–Eroski	+ 4"
3	Jörg Jaksche (GER)	ONCE–Eroski	+ 12"
4	Abraham Olano (ESP)	ONCE–Eroski	+ 22"
5	Isidro Nozal (ESP)	ONCE–Eroski	+ 27"
6	José Azevedo (POR)	ONCE–Eroski	+ 28"
7	Marcos-Antonio Serrano (ESP)	ONCE–Eroski	+ 30"
~~8~~	~~Lance Armstrong (USA)~~	~~U.S. Postal Service~~	~~+ 34"~~
9	Tyler Hamilton (USA)	CSC–Tiscali	+ 53"
10	Andrea Peron (ITA)	CSC–Tiscali	s.t.

== Stage 8 ==
14 July 2002 — Saint-Martin-de-Landelles to Plouay, 217.5 km (135.1 mi)

A group of seven escaped this time, consisting of Franck Rénier, Sébastien Hinault, Stéphane Augé, Erik Dekker, Karsten Kroon, Servais Knaven and Raivis Belohvoščiks. This time the work of the teams from ONCE (González de Galdeano and Beloki) and AG2R (Kirsipuu) was not enough to catch them back, and the seven were to decide who would win the stage. Dekker made several breakaway attempts, then had to drop back, but managed to return. Belohvoščiks seemed to have the best form of the seven, but his attacks were also countered. In the spurt, Kroon won, partly through excellent help from his teammate Dekker. Although it is known that on July 14; Quatorze Juillet) the French riders always do a bit extra to try to win the stage, today it was the Netherlands that scored the first three places. Robbie McEwen won two points on Zabel in the first sprint, and one more at the finish, but it was not enough to take over the green jersey. Óscar Freire and Aart Vierhouten did not start today's stage.

Stage 8 result

Rank	Rider	Team	Time
1	Karsten Kroon (NED)	Rabobank	4h 36' 52"
2	Servais Knaven (NED)	Domo-Farm Frites	s.t.
3	Erik Dekker (NED)	Rabobank	s.t.
4	Franck Rénier (FRA)	Bonjour	s.t.
5	Sébastien Hinault (FRA)	Crédit Agricole	s.t.
6	Stéphane Augé (FRA)	Jean Delatour	s.t.
7	Raivis Belohvoščiks (LAT)	Lampre–Daikin	s.t.
8	Robbie McEwen (AUS)	Lotto–Adecco	+ 1' 55"
9	Erik Zabel (GER)	Team Telekom	s.t.
10	Baden Cooke (AUS)	Française des Jeux	s.t.

General classification after stage 8

Rank	Rider	Team	Time
1	Igor González de Galdeano (ESP)	ONCE–Eroski	32h 18' 46"
2	Joseba Beloki (ESP)	ONCE–Eroski	+ 4"
3	Jörg Jaksche (GER)	ONCE–Eroski	+ 12"
4	Abraham Olano (ESP)	ONCE–Eroski	+ 22"
5	Isidro Nozal (ESP)	ONCE–Eroski	+ 27"
6	José Azevedo (POR)	ONCE–Eroski	+ 28"
7	Marcos-Antonio Serrano (ESP)	ONCE–Eroski	+ 30"
~~8~~	~~Lance Armstrong (USA)~~	~~U.S. Postal Service~~	~~+ 34"~~
9	Tyler Hamilton (USA)	CSC–Tiscali	+ 53"
10	Andrea Peron (ITA)	CSC–Tiscali	s.t.

== Stage 9 ==
15 July 2002 — Lanester to Lorient, 52 km (32.3 mi) (individual time trial)

As expected, the time trial did a lot to upset the general classification. Hungarian specialist László Bodrogi set an early time that lasted quite long, until Santiago Botero topped it. In the end, Botero's time was not beaten by anyone, Armstrong coming closest, 11 seconds behind. González de Galdeano lost only 8 seconds to Armstrong, and is now 26 seconds ahead in the GC - note that Armstrong lost 27 seconds in stage 7; he would have worn the yellow with 1 second difference otherwise. Riders like Honchar and Beloki also did not lose much time, so Armstrong might well have a harder fight ahead than the previous years.

Stage 9 result

Rank	Rider	Team	Time
1	Santiago Botero (COL)	Kelme–Costa Blanca	1h 02' 19"
~~2~~	~~Lance Armstrong (USA)~~	~~U.S. Postal Service~~	~~+ 11"~~
3	Serhiy Honchar (UKR)	Fassa Bortolo	+ 18"
4	Igor González de Galdeano (ESP)	ONCE–Eroski	+ 19"
5	László Bodrogi (HUN)	Mapei–Quick-Step	+ 25"
6	Raimondas Rumšas (LTU)	Lampre–Daikin	s.t.
7	David Millar (GBR)	Cofidis	+ 50"
8	Dario Frigo (ITA)	Tacconi Sport	+ 1' 34"
9	Andrea Peron (ITA)	CSC–Tiscali	s.t.
10	Joseba Beloki (ESP)	ONCE–Eroski	+ 1' 38"

General classification after stage 9

Rank	Rider	Team	Time
1	Igor González de Galdeano (ESP)	ONCE–Eroski	33h 21' 23"
~~2~~	~~Lance Armstrong (USA)~~	~~U.S. Postal Service~~	~~+ 26"~~
3	Joseba Beloki (ESP)	ONCE–Eroski	+ 1' 23"
4	Serhiy Honchar (UKR)	Fassa Bortolo	+ 1' 35"
5	Santiago Botero (COL)	Kelme–Costa Blanca	+ 1' 55"
6	Andrea Peron (ITA)	CSC–Tiscali	+ 2' 08"
7	David Millar (GBR)	Cofidis	+ 2' 11"
8	Raimondas Rumšas (LTU)	Lampre–Daikin	+ 2' 22"
9	Tyler Hamilton (USA)	CSC–Tiscali	+ 2' 30"
10	José Azevedo (POR)	ONCE–Eroski	+ 2' 45"

== Stage 10 ==
17 July 2002 — Bazas to Pau, 147 km (91.3 mi)

The last stage before the mountains showed the usual pattern: Many attacks in the early part of the stage, then a group that managed to get away. This time the group was relatively large, consisting of 10 riders. Patrice Halgand apparently was of the opinion that this was too many, and attacked on the final climb with 21 km to go. Only Stuart O'Grady, Ludo Dierckxsens and Jérôme Pineau were able to follow. With 8 km to go, he attacked a second time, and rode alone to the finish for a well-deserved victory. O'Grady, the best sprinter in the group, even missed second place as Pineau managed to escape shortly before the finish. On a sad note, a French boy died after having been hit by a car in the caravan preceding and following the Tour.

Stage 10 result

Rank	Rider	Team	Time
1	Patrice Halgand (FRA)	Jean Delatour	3h 00' 15"
2	Jérôme Pineau (FRA)	Bonjour	+ 27"
3	Stuart O'Grady (AUS)	Crédit Agricole	+ 33"
4	Ludo Dierckxsens (BEL)	Lampre–Daikin	s.t.
5	Pedro Horrillo (ESP)	Mapei–Quick-Step	+ 1' 00"
6	Andy Flickinger (FRA)	AG2R Prévoyance	s.t.
7	Nicolas Vogondy (FRA)	Française des Jeux	s.t.
8	Nico Mattan (BEL)	Cofidis	s.t.
9	Constantino Zaballa (ESP)	Kelme–Costa Blanca	s.t.
10	Enrico Cassani (ITA)	Domo-Farm Frites	+ 1' 02"

General classification after stage 10

Rank	Rider	Team	Time
1	Igor González de Galdeano (ESP)	ONCE–Eroski	36h 25' 35"
~~2~~	~~Lance Armstrong (USA)~~	~~U.S. Postal Service~~	~~+ 26"~~
3	Joseba Beloki (ESP)	ONCE–Eroski	+ 1' 23"
4	Serhiy Honchar (UKR)	Fassa Bortolo	+ 1' 35"
5	Santiago Botero (COL)	Kelme–Costa Blanca	+ 1' 55"
6	Andrea Peron (ITA)	CSC–Tiscali	+ 2' 08"
7	David Millar (GBR)	Cofidis	+ 2' 11"
8	Stuart O'Grady (AUS)	Crédit Agricole	+ 2' 15"
9	Raimondas Rumšas (LTU)	Lampre–Daikin	+ 2' 22"
10	Tyler Hamilton (USA)	CSC–Tiscali	+ 2' 30"
