= 2002 Tour de France, Stage 11 to Stage 20 =

Cycling race stages

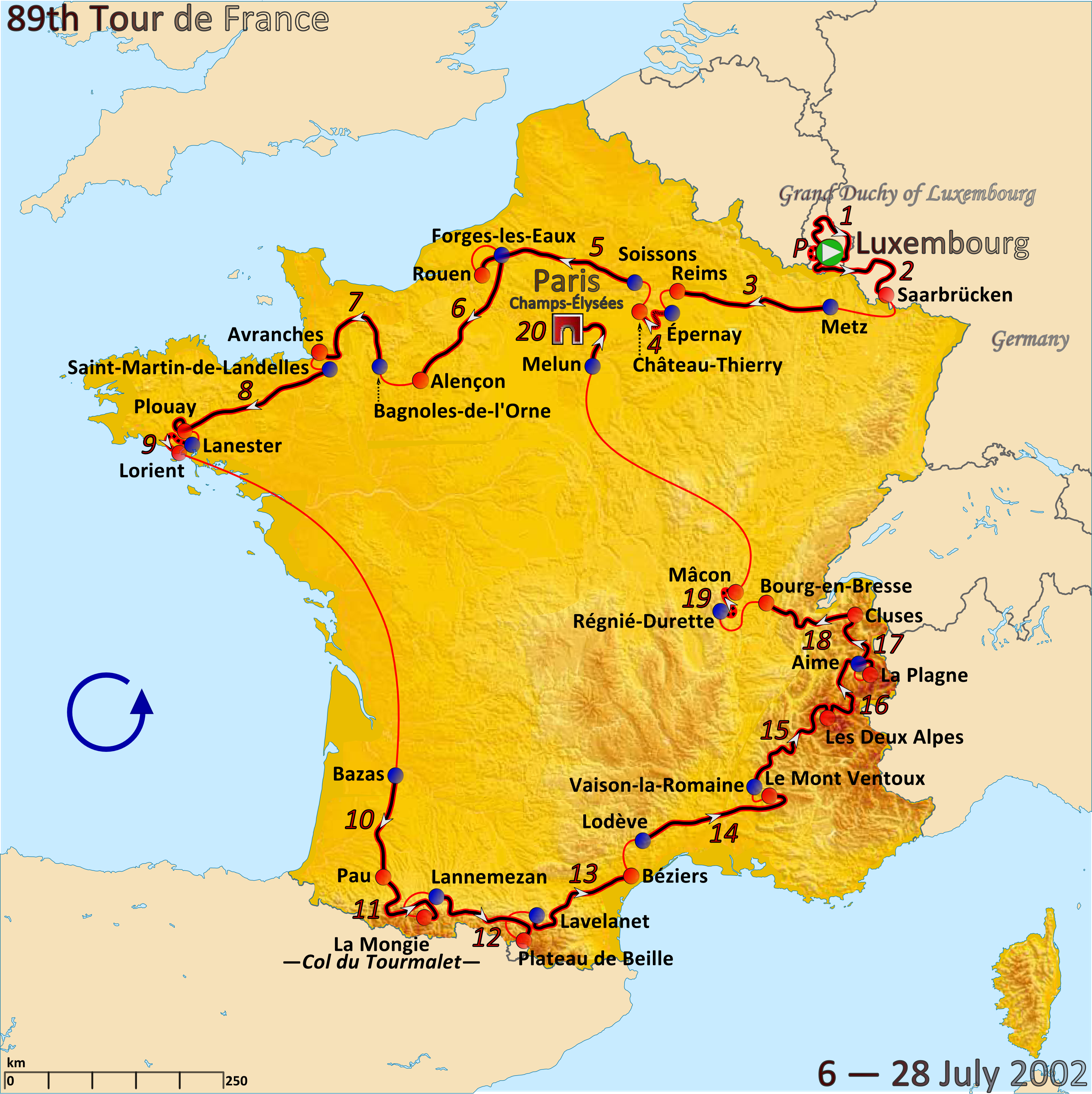
Route of the 2002 Tour de France

The 2002 Tour de France was the 89th edition of Tour de France, one of cycling's Grand Tours. The Tour began in Luxembourg City with a prologue individual time trial on 6 July and Stage 11 occurred on 18 July with a flat stage from Pau. The race finished on the Champs-Élysées in Paris on 28 July.

== Stage 11 ==
18 July 2002 — Pau to La Mongie (Col du Tourmalet), 158 km (98.2 mi)

Stage 11 result

Rank	Rider	Team	Time
~~1~~	~~Lance Armstrong (USA)~~	~~U.S. Postal Service~~	4h 21' 57"
2	Joseba Beloki (ESP)	ONCE–Eroski	+ 7"
3	Roberto Heras (ESP)	U.S. Postal Service	+ 13"
4	Francisco Mancebo (ESP)	iBanesto.com	+ 1' 16"
5	Raimondas Rumšas (LTU)	Lampre–Daikin	s.t.
6	Óscar Sevilla (ESP)	Kelme–Costa Blanca	+ 1' 23"
7	Ivan Basso (ITA)	Fassa Bortolo	s.t.
8	Andrei Kivilev (KAZ)	Cofidis	+ 1' 34"
9	Laurent Jalabert (FRA)	CSC–Tiscali	+ 1' 49"
10	José Azevedo (POR)	ONCE–Eroski	+ 1' 52"

General classification after stage 11

Rank	Rider	Team	Time
~~1~~	~~Lance Armstrong (USA)~~	~~U.S. Postal Service~~	40h 47' 38"
2	Joseba Beloki (ESP)	ONCE–Eroski	+ 1' 12"
3	Igor González de Galdeano (ESP)	ONCE–Eroski	+ 1' 48"
4	Raimondas Rumšas (LTU)	Lampre–Daikin	+ 3' 32"
5	Santiago Botero (COL)	Kelme–Costa Blanca	+ 4' 13"
6	José Azevedo (POR)	ONCE–Eroski	+ 4' 31"
7	Marcos-Antonio Serrano (ESP)	ONCE–Eroski	+ 5' 17"
8	Ivan Basso (ITA)	Fassa Bortolo	+ 5' 22"
9	Francisco Mancebo (ESP)	iBanesto.com	+ 5' 33"
10	Serhiy Honchar (UKR)	Fassa Bortolo	+ 5' 35"

== Stage 12 ==
19 July 2002 — Lannemezan to Plateau-de-Beille, 199.5 km (124.0 mi)

Stage 12 result

Rank	Rider	Team	Time
~~1~~	~~Lance Armstrong (USA)~~	~~U.S. Postal Service~~	~~6h 00' 29"~~
2	Roberto Heras (ESP)	U.S. Postal Service	+ 1' 04"
3	Joseba Beloki (ESP)	ONCE–Eroski	s.t.
4	Santiago Botero (COL)	Kelme–Costa Blanca	+ 1' 11"
5	Igor González de Galdeano (ESP)	ONCE–Eroski	s.t.
6	Raimondas Rumšas (LTU)	Lampre–Daikin	+ 1' 23"
7	Carlos Sastre (ESP)	CSC–Tiscali	+ 1' 33"
8	Marcos-Antonio Serrano (ESP)	ONCE–Eroski	+ 1' 37"
9	Óscar Sevilla (ESP)	Kelme–Costa Blanca	+ 2' 07"
10	Andrei Kivilev (KAZ)	Cofidis	+ 2' 39"

General classification after stage 12

Rank	Rider	Team	Time
~~1~~	~~Lance Armstrong (USA)~~	~~U.S. Postal Service~~	~~46h 47' 47"~~
2	Joseba Beloki (ESP)	ONCE–Eroski	+ 2' 28"
3	Igor González de Galdeano (ESP)	ONCE–Eroski	+ 3' 19"
4	Raimondas Rumšas (LTU)	Lampre–Daikin	+ 5' 15"
5	Santiago Botero (COL)	Kelme–Costa Blanca	+ 5' 44"
6	Marcos-Antonio Serrano (ESP)	ONCE–Eroski	+ 7' 14"
7	Roberto Heras (ESP)	U.S. Postal Service	+ 8' 01"
8	José Azevedo (POR)	ONCE–Eroski	+ 8' 24"
9	Óscar Sevilla (ESP)	Kelme–Costa Blanca	+ 9' 05"
10	Francisco Mancebo (ESP)	iBanesto.com	+ 9' 10"

== Stage 13 ==
20 July 2002 — Lavelanet to Béziers, 171 km (106.3 mi)

Stage 13 result

Rank	Rider	Team	Time
1	David Millar (GBR)	Cofidis	4h 08' 18"
2	David Etxebarría (ESP)	Euskaltel–Euskadi	s.t.
3	Michael Boogerd (NED)	Rabobank	s.t.
4	Laurent Brochard (FRA)	Jean Delatour	s.t.
5	David Latasa (ESP)	iBanesto.com	+ 4"
6	Javier Pascual Rodríguez (ESP)	iBanesto.com	+ 56"
7	Eddy Mazzoleni (ITA)	Tacconi Sport	s.t.
8	Miguel Martinez (FRA)	Mapei–Quick-Step	+ 1' 06"
9	Beat Zberg (SUI)	Rabobank	s.t.
10	Bobby Julich (USA)	Team Telekom	+ 1' 08"

General classification after stage 13

Rank	Rider	Team	Time
~~1~~	~~Lance Armstrong (USA)~~	~~U.S. Postal Service~~	~~51h 06' 01"~~
2	Joseba Beloki (ESP)	ONCE–Eroski	+ 2' 28"
3	Igor González de Galdeano (ESP)	ONCE–Eroski	+ 3' 19"
4	Raimondas Rumšas (LTU)	Lampre–Daikin	+ 5' 15"
5	Santiago Botero (COL)	Kelme–Costa Blanca	+ 5' 44"
6	Marcos-Antonio Serrano (ESP)	ONCE–Eroski	+ 7' 14"
7	Roberto Heras (ESP)	U.S. Postal Service	+ 8' 01"
8	José Azevedo (POR)	ONCE–Eroski	+ 8' 24"
9	Laurent Jalabert (FRA)	CSC–Tiscali	+ 8' 57"
10	Óscar Sevilla (ESP)	Kelme–Costa Blanca	+ 9' 05"

== Stage 14 ==
21 July 2002 — Lodève to Mont Ventoux, 221 km (137.3 mi)

Stage 14 result

Rank	Rider	Team	Time
1	Richard Virenque (FRA)	Domo–Farm Frites	5h 43' 26"
2	Alexander Bocharov (RUS)	AG2R Prévoyance	+ 1' 58"
~~3~~	~~Lance Armstrong (USA)~~	~~U.S. Postal Service~~	~~+ 2' 20"~~
4	Marco Serpellini (ITA)	Lampre–Daikin	+ 2' 54"
5	Raimondas Rumšas (LTU)	Lampre–Daikin	+ 3' 36"
6	Ivan Basso (ITA)	Fassa Bortolo	+ 3' 39"
7	Francisco Mancebo (ESP)	iBanesto.com	+ 3' 51"
8	Joseba Beloki (ESP)	ONCE–Eroski	+ 4' 05"
9	Dariusz Baranowski (POL)	iBanesto.com	+ 4' 10"
10	Ivan Gotti (ITA)	Alessio	+ 4' 16"

General classification after stage 14

Rank	Rider	Team	Time
~~1~~	~~Lance Armstrong (USA)~~	~~U.S. Postal Service~~	~~56h 51' 39"~~
2	Joseba Beloki (ESP)	ONCE–Eroski	+ 4' 21"
3	Raimondas Rumšas (LTU)	Lampre–Daikin	+ 6' 39"
4	Igor González de Galdeano (ESP)	ONCE–Eroski	+ 8' 36"
5	Francisco Mancebo (ESP)	iBanesto.com	+ 10' 49"
6	José Azevedo (POR)	ONCE–Eroski	+ 10' 57"
7	Roberto Heras (ESP)	U.S. Postal Service	+ 11' 35"
8	Óscar Sevilla (ESP)	Kelme–Costa Blanca	+ 12' 45"
9	Levi Leipheimer (USA)	Rabobank	+ 12' 54"
10	Richard Virenque (FRA)	Domo–Farm Frites	+ 13' 12"

== Stage 15 ==
23 July 2002 — Vaison-la-Romaine to Les Deux Alpes, 226.5 km (140.7 mi)

Stage 15 result

Rank	Rider	Team	Time
1	Santiago Botero (COL)	Kelme–Costa Blanca	5h 55' 16"
2	Mario Aerts (BEL)	Lotto–Adecco	+ 1' 51"
3	Axel Merckx (BEL)	Domo–Farm Frites	+ 2' 30"
4	Emmanuel Magnien (FRA)	Bonjour	+ 4' 22"
5	Sandy Casar (FRA)	Française des Jeux	+ 4' 28"
6	José Vicente García Acosta (ESP)	iBanesto.com	+ 5' 15"
7	Raimondas Rumšas (LTU)	Lampre–Daikin	+ 6' 41"
8	Joseba Beloki (ESP)	ONCE–Eroski	s.t.
~~9~~	~~Lance Armstrong (USA)~~	~~U.S. Postal Service~~	~~s.t.~~
10	Francisco Mancebo (ESP)	iBanesto.com	+ 6' 46"

General classification after stage 15

Rank	Rider	Team	Time
~~1~~	~~Lance Armstrong (USA)~~	~~U.S. Postal Service~~	~~62h 53'36"~~
2	Joseba Beloki (ESP)	ONCE–Eroski	+ 4' 21"
3	Raimondas Rumšas (LTU)	Lampre–Daikin	+ 6' 39"
4	Igor González de Galdeano (ESP)	ONCE–Eroski	+ 8' 50"
5	Francisco Mancebo (ESP)	iBanesto.com	+ 10' 54"
6	José Azevedo (POR)	ONCE–Eroski	+ 11' 11"
7	Santiago Botero (COL)	Kelme–Costa Blanca	+ 11' 31"
8	Roberto Heras (ESP)	U.S. Postal Service	+ 11' 46"
9	Levi Leipheimer (USA)	Rabobank	+ 13' 05"
10	Ivan Basso (ITA)	Fassa Bortolo	+ 14' 07"

== Stage 16 ==
24 July 2002 — Les Deux Alpes to La Plagne, 179.5 km (111.5 mi)

Stage 16 result

Rank	Rider	Team	Time
1	Michael Boogerd (NED)	Rabobank	5h 48' 29"
2	Carlos Sastre (ESP)	CSC–Tiscali	1' 25"
~~3~~	~~Lance Armstrong (USA)~~	~~U.S. Postal Service~~	~~s.t.~~
4	Joseba Beloki (ESP)	ONCE–Eroski	+ 2' 02"
5	Raimondas Rumšas (LTU)	Lampre–Daikin	s.t.
6	Levi Leipheimer (USA)	Rabobank	+ 2' 10"
7	Ivan Basso (ITA)	Fassa Bortolo	+ 2' 14"
8	José Azevedo (POR)	ONCE–Eroski	s.t.
9	Santiago Botero (COL)	Kelme–Costa Blanca	+ 2' 23"
10	Roberto Heras (ESP)	U.S. Postal Service	+ 2' 25"

General classification after stage 16

Rank	Rider	Team	Time
~~1~~	~~Lance Armstrong (USA)~~	~~U.S. Postal Service~~	~~68h 43' 22"~~
2	Joseba Beloki (ESP)	ONCE–Eroski	+ 5' 06"
3	Raimondas Rumšas (LTU)	Lampre–Daikin	+ 7' 24"
4	José Azevedo (POR)	ONCE–Eroski	+ 12' 08"
5	Igor González de Galdeano (ESP)	ONCE–Eroski	+ 12' 12"
6	Francisco Mancebo (ESP)	iBanesto.com	+ 12' 28"
7	Santiago Botero (COL)	Kelme–Costa Blanca	+ 12' 37"
8	Roberto Heras (ESP)	U.S. Postal Service	+ 12' 54"
9	Levi Leipheimer (USA)	Rabobank	+ 13' 58"
10	Ivan Basso (ITA)	Fassa Bortolo	+ 15' 04"

== Stage 17 ==
25 July 2002 — Aime to Cluses, 142 km (88.2 mi)

Stage 17 result

Rank	Rider	Team	Time
1	Dario Frigo (ITA)	Tacconi Sport	4h 02' 27"
2	Mario Aerts (BEL)	Lotto–Adecco	s.t.
3	Giuseppe Guerini (ITA)	Team Telekom	+ 2"
4	David Moncoutié (FRA)	Cofidis	+ 2' 55"
5	Thor Hushovd (NOR)	Crédit Agricole	+ 2' 58"
6	Laurent Lefèvre (FRA)	Jean Delatour	s.t.
7	Unai Osa (ESP)	iBanesto.com	s.t.
8	Marcos-Antonio Serrano (ESP)	ONCE–Eroski	s.t.
9	Jörg Jaksche (GER)	ONCE–Eroski	s.t.
10	Carlos Sastre (ESP)	CSC–Tiscali	s.t.

General classification after stage 17

Rank	Rider	Team	Time
~~1~~	~~Lance Armstrong (USA)~~	~~U.S. Postal Service~~	~~72h 50' 25"~~
2	Joseba Beloki (ESP)	ONCE–Eroski	+ 5' 06"
3	Raimondas Rumšas (LTU)	Lampre–Daikin	+ 7' 24"
4	Santiago Botero (COL)	Kelme–Costa Blanca	+ 10' 59"
5	José Azevedo (POR)	ONCE–Eroski	+ 12' 08"
6	Igor González de Galdeano (ESP)	ONCE–Eroski	+ 12' 12"
7	Francisco Mancebo (ESP)	iBanesto.com	+ 12' 28"
8	Roberto Heras (ESP)	U.S. Postal Service	+ 12' 54"
9	Levi Leipheimer (USA)	Rabobank	+ 13' 58"
10	Carlos Sastre (ESP)	CSC–Tiscali	+ 14' 49"

== Stage 18 ==
26 July 2002 — Cluses to Bourg-en-Bresse, 176.5 km (109.7 mi)

Stage 18 result

Rank	Rider	Team	Time
1	Thor Hushovd (NOR)	Crédit Agricole	4h 28' 28"
2	Christophe Mengin (FRA)	Française des Jeux	s.t.
3	Jakob Piil (DEN)	CSC–Tiscali	+ 5"
4	Léon van Bon (NED)	Domo–Farm Frites	+ 33"
5	Jörg Jaksche (GER)	ONCE–Eroski	s.t.
6	Nicki Sørensen (DEN)	CSC–Tiscali	s.t.
7	Gian Matteo Fagnini (ITA)	Team Telekom	+ 40"
8	Erik Dekker (NED)	Rabobank	s.t.
9	Thierry Loder (FRA)	AG2R Prévoyance	s.t.
10	Nicola Loda (ITA)	Fassa Bortolo	+ 6' 59"

General classification after stage 18

Rank	Rider	Team	Time
~~1~~	~~Lance Armstrong (USA)~~	~~U.S. Postal Service~~	~~77h 30' 35"~~
2	Joseba Beloki (ESP)	ONCE–Eroski	+ 5' 06"
3	Raimondas Rumšas (LTU)	Lampre–Daikin	+ 7' 24"
4	Santiago Botero (COL)	Kelme–Costa Blanca	+ 10' 59"
5	José Azevedo (POR)	ONCE–Eroski	+ 12' 08"
6	Igor González de Galdeano (ESP)	ONCE–Eroski	+ 12' 12"
7	Francisco Mancebo (ESP)	iBanesto.com	+ 12' 28"
8	Roberto Heras (ESP)	U.S. Postal Service	+ 12' 54"
9	Levi Leipheimer (USA)	Rabobank	+ 13' 58"
10	Carlos Sastre (ESP)	CSC–Tiscali	+ 14' 49"

== Stage 19 ==
27 July 2002 — Régnié-Durette to Mâcon, 50 km (31.1 mi) (individual time trial)

Stage 19 result

Rank	Rider	Team	Time
~~1~~	~~Lance Armstrong (USA)~~	~~U.S. Postal Service~~	~~1h 03' 50"~~
2	Raimondas Rumšas (LTU)	Lampre–Daikin	+ 52"
3	László Bodrogi (HUN)	Mapei–Quick-Step	+ 1' 06"
4	David Millar (GBR)	Cofidis	+ 1' 14"
5	Igor González de Galdeano (ESP)	ONCE–Eroski	+ 1' 42"
6	Serhiy Honchar (UKR)	Fassa Bortolo	+ 1' 43"
7	Raivis Belohvoščiks (LAT)	Lampre–Daikin	+ 2' 09"
8	Santiago Botero (COL)	Kelme–Costa Blanca	+ 2' 10"
9	Joseba Beloki (ESP)	ONCE–Eroski	+ 2' 11"
10	Víctor Hugo Peña (COL)	U.S. Postal Service	+ 2' 29"

General classification after stage 19

Rank	Rider	Team	Time
~~1~~	~~Lance Armstrong (USA)~~	~~U.S. Postal Service~~	~~78h 34' 25"~~
2	Joseba Beloki (ESP)	ONCE–Eroski	+ 7' 17"
3	Raimondas Rumšas (LTU)	Lampre–Daikin	+ 8' 17"
4	Santiago Botero (COL)	Kelme–Costa Blanca	+ 13' 10"
5	Igor González de Galdeano (ESP)	ONCE–Eroski	+ 13' 54"
6	José Azevedo (POR)	ONCE–Eroski	+ 15' 44"
7	Francisco Mancebo (ESP)	iBanesto.com	+ 16' 05"
8	Levi Leipheimer (USA)	Rabobank	+ 17' 11"
9	Roberto Heras (ESP)	U.S. Postal Service	+ 17' 18"
10	Carlos Sastre (ESP)	CSC–Tiscali	+ 19' 05"

== Stage 20 ==
28 July 2002 — Melun to Paris Champs-Élysées, 144 km (89.5 mi)

Stage 20 result

Rank	Rider	Team	Time
1	Robbie McEwen (AUS)	Lotto–Adecco	3h 30' 47"
2	Baden Cooke (AUS)	Française des Jeux	s.t.
3	Damien Nazon (FRA)	Bonjour	s.t.
4	Fabio Baldato (ITA)	Fassa Bortolo	s.t.
5	Davide Casarotto (ITA)	Alessio	s.t.
6	Stuart O'Grady (AUS)	Crédit Agricole	s.t.
7	Erik Zabel (GER)	Team Telekom	s.t.
8	Ján Svorada (CZE)	Lampre–Daikin	s.t.
9	Arvis Piziks (LAT)	CSC–Tiscali	s.t.
10	Nicola Loda (ITA)	Fassa Bortolo	s.t.

General classification after stage 20

Rank	Rider	Team	Time
~~1~~	~~Lance Armstrong (USA)~~	~~U.S. Postal Service~~	~~82h 05' 12"~~
2	Joseba Beloki (ESP)	ONCE–Eroski	+ 7' 17"
3	Raimondas Rumšas (LTU)	Lampre–Daikin	+ 8' 17"
4	Santiago Botero (COL)	Kelme–Costa Blanca	+ 13' 10"
5	Igor González de Galdeano (ESP)	ONCE–Eroski	+ 13' 54"
6	José Azevedo (POR)	ONCE–Eroski	+ 15' 44"
7	Francisco Mancebo (ESP)	iBanesto.com	+ 16' 05"
8	Levi Leipheimer (USA)	Rabobank	+ 17' 11"
9	Roberto Heras (ESP)	U.S. Postal Service	+ 17' 12"
10	Carlos Sastre (ESP)	CSC–Tiscali	+ 19' 05"
