= 2002 Tour de France =

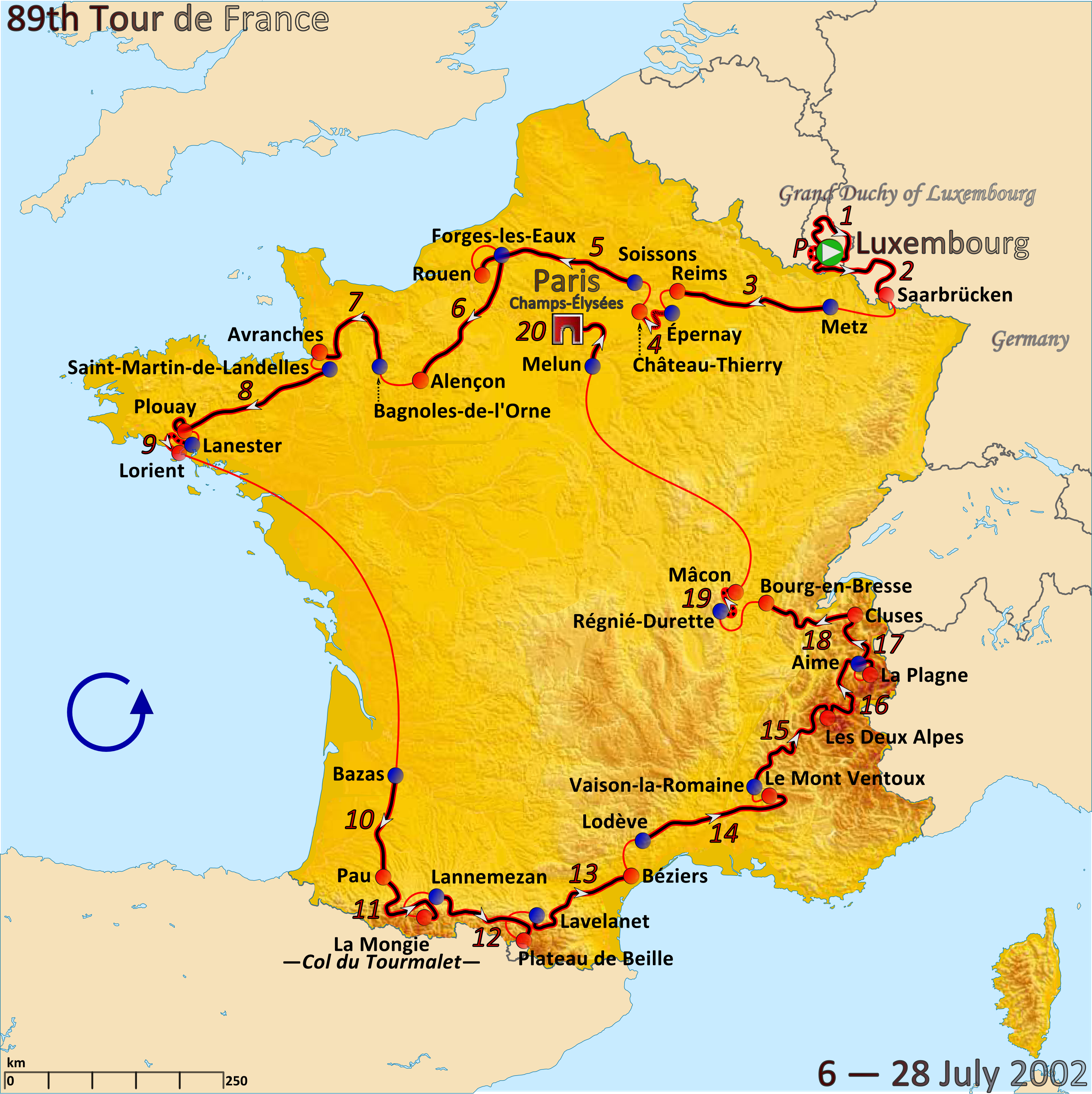
- Route of the 2002 Tour de France

Race details
- Dates: 6–28 July 2002
- Stages: 20 + Prologue
- Distance: 3,278 km (2,037 mi)
- Winning time: 82h 05' 12"

Results
	Winner	~~Lance Armstrong~~ none (Note: On 24 August 2012, the United States Anti-Doping Agency announced that they had disqualified Armstrong from all his results since 1998, including his victory in the 2002 Tour de France. The Union Cycliste Internationale, responsible for the international cycling, confirmed this verdict on 22 October 2012.)	
	Second	Joseba Beloki (ESP)	(ONCE–Eroski)
	Third	Raimondas Rumšas (Lithuania)	(Lampre–Daikin)
Jersey awarded to the points classification winner	Points	Robbie McEwen (AUS)	(Lotto–Adecco)
Jersey awarded to the mountains classification winner	Mountains	Laurent Jalabert (FRA)	(CSC–Tiscali)
Jersey awarded to the youth classification winner	Youth	Ivan Basso (ITA)	(Fassa Bortolo)
Jersey awarded to the combativity classification winner	Combativity	Laurent Jalabert (FRA)	(CSC–Tiscali)
	Team	ONCE–Eroski	

The 2002 Tour de France was a multiple-stage bicycle race held from 6 to 28 July, and the 89th edition of the Tour de France. The event started in Luxembourg and ended in Paris. The Tour circled France counter-clockwise, visiting the Pyrenees before the Alps. It has no overall winner—although American cyclist Lance Armstrong originally won the event, the United States Anti-Doping Agency announced in August 2012 that they had disqualified Armstrong from all his results since 1998, including his seven Tour de France wins from 1999 to 2005; the Union Cycliste Internationale confirmed the result.

The favourite was Armstrong, who was, at the time, the winner in the 1999, 2000 and 2001 races. The main opposition would probably come from the ONCE team with Joseba Beloki (3rd last year), Igor González de Galdeano (5th last year) and Marcos Serrano (9th last year), and from the Kelme riders Óscar Sevilla (7th last year, 2nd in last year's Vuelta a España) and Santiago Botero (8th last year). Other riders to keep in account for a high place in the final rankings were Tyler Hamilton (2nd Giro 2002), Levi Leipheimer (3rd Vuelta 2001), Christophe Moreau (4th Tour 2000) and Armstrong's teammate Roberto Heras (4th Vuelta 2001). Important riders who were not present were Jan Ullrich (2nd last year, injury) and Gilberto Simoni (winner 2001 Giro).

== Teams ==
Teams qualified for the 2002 Tour de France by various methods. U.S. Postal Service was selected because it included the winner of the previous edition, Lance Armstrong. Rabobank was selected because it included the winner of the 2001 UCI Road World Cup, Erik Dekker. Alessio, Kelme–Costa Blanca and iBanesto.com were selected because they won the team classifications in respectively the 2001 Giro d'Italia, 2001 Tour de France and 2001 Vuelta a España. A further seven teams qualified based on the UCI ranking in the highest UCI division at the end of 2001, after compensating for transfers. Five more teams were given wildcards by the organiser of the Tour, Amaury Sport Organisation. After the wildcards were given, it was announced that Saeco's main rider Gilberto Simoni had tested positive for cocaine on two occasions. In response, the wildcard for Saeco was withdrawn and given to Jean Delatour. In total, 21 teams participated, each with 9 cyclists, for a total of 189 cyclists.

The teams entering the race were:

Qualified teams

- Alessio
- Cofidis
- CSC–Tiscali
- Domo–Farm Frites
- Euskaltel–Euskadi
- Fassa Bortolo
- iBanesto.com
- Kelme–Costa Blanca
- Lampre–Daikin
- Lotto–Adecco
- Mapei–Quick-Step
- ONCE–Eroski
- Rabobank
- Tacconi Sport
- Team Telekom
- U.S. Postal Service

Invited teams

- AG2R Prévoyance
- Crédit Agricole
- Bonjour
- Française des Jeux
- Saeco–Longoni Sport

== Route and stages ==
In the first week, the stages were mostly flat in the North of France. The last two weeks had mountain stages in the Pyrenees and Alps. The highest point of elevation in the race was 2,642 m (8,668 ft) at the summit of the Col du Galibier mountain pass on stage 16.

Stage characteristics and winners
Stage	Date	Course	Distance	Type	Winner
P	6 July	Luxembourg City (Luxembourg)	7.0 km (4.3 mi)	Individual time trial	~~Lance Armstrong (USA)~~
1	7 July	Luxembourg City (Luxembourg)	192.5 km (119.6 mi)	Plain stage	Rubens Bertogliati (SUI)
2	8 July	Luxembourg City (Luxembourg) to Saarbrücken (Germany)	181.0 km (112.5 mi)	Plain stage	Óscar Freire (ESP)
3	9 July	Metz to Reims	174.5 km (108.4 mi)	Plain stage	Robbie McEwen (AUS)
4	10 July	Épernay to Château-Thierry	67.5 km (41.9 mi)	Team time trial	ONCE–Eroski
5	11 July	Soissons to Rouen	195.0 km (121.2 mi)	Plain stage	Jaan Kirsipuu (EST)
6	12 July	Forges-les-Eaux to Alençon	199.5 km (124.0 mi)	Plain stage	Erik Zabel (GER)
7	13 July	Bagnoles-de-l'Orne to Avranches	176.0 km (109.4 mi)	Plain stage	Bradley McGee (AUS)
8	14 July	Saint-Martin-de-Landelles to Plouay	217.5 km (135.1 mi)	Plain stage	Karsten Kroon (NED)
9	15 July	Lanester to Lorient	52.0 km (32.3 mi)	Individual time trial	Santiago Botero (COL)
	16 July	Bordeaux		Rest day	
10	17 July	Bazas to Pau	147.0 km (91.3 mi)	Plain stage	Patrice Halgand (FRA)
11	18 July	Pau to La Mongie	158.0 km (98.2 mi)	Stage with mountain(s)	~~Lance Armstrong (USA)~~
12	19 July	Lannemezan to Plateau de Beille	199.5 km (124.0 mi)	Stage with mountain(s)	~~Lance Armstrong (USA)~~
13	20 July	Lavelanet to Béziers	171.0 km (106.3 mi)	Plain stage	David Millar (GBR)
14	21 July	Lodève to Mont Ventoux	221.0 km (137.3 mi)	Stage with mountain(s)	Richard Virenque (FRA)
	22 July	Vaucluse		Rest day	
15	23 July	Vaison-la-Romaine to Les Deux Alpes	226.5 km (140.7 mi)	Hilly stage	Santiago Botero (COL)
16	24 July	Les Deux Alpes to La Plagne	179.5 km (111.5 mi)	Stage with mountain(s)	Michael Boogerd (NED)
17	25 July	Aime to Cluses	142.0 km (88.2 mi)	Stage with mountain(s)	Dario Frigo (ITA)
18	26 July	Cluses to Bourg-en-Bresse	176.5 km (109.7 mi)	Hilly stage	Thor Hushovd (NOR)
19	27 July	Régnié-Durette to Mâcon	50.0 km (31.1 mi)	Individual time trial	~~Lance Armstrong (USA)~~
20	28 July	Melun to Paris (Champs-Élysées)	144.0 km (89.5 mi)	Plain stage	Robbie McEwen (AUS)
	Total		3,278 km (2,037 mi)		

== Race overview ==
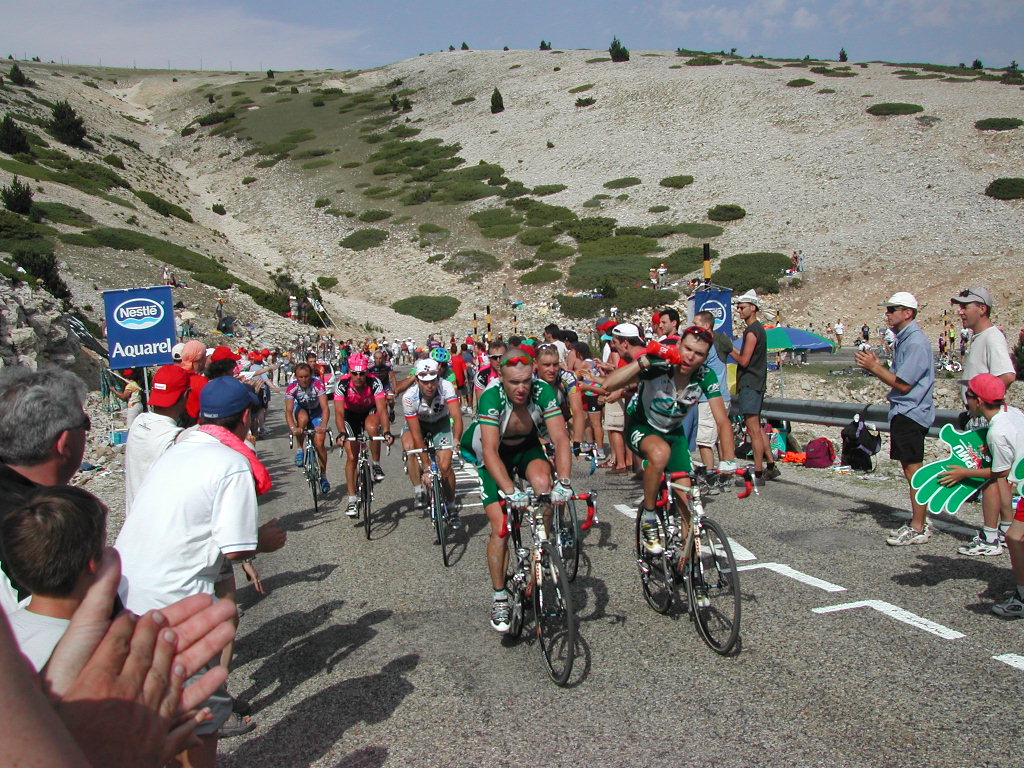
Riders on the way to Mont Ventoux on the fourteenth stage

The Prologue was won by Lance Armstrong with Laurent Jalabert and Raimondas Rumšas coming in 2nd and 3rd respectively. Armstrong and his incredibly dominant US Postal team were not concerned with defending the Yellow Jersey in the early flat stages and it changed hands a few times. First it went to Rubens Bertogliati who wore it during Stage 2 and Stage 3, where Robbie McEwen defeated Erik Zabel in the sprint gaining enough time for the latter to wear the maillot jaune in Stage 4, which was a Team Time Trial. Team ONCE–Eroski won the TTT and their rider Igor González de Galdeano took over the overall lead. At this point in the Tour all of the Top 10 overall riders were either members of team ONCE or US Postal Cycling Team, but with two more ITT's and the Mountain stages to come this meant nothing as far as the overall standings, although it did make clear the fact that these two teams were in command within the Peloton.

The ensuing flat stages were won by Jaan Kirsipuu, Erik Zabel, Bradley McGee and Karsten Kroon and by the end of Stage 8 places 1-7 were all riders for ONCE with Gonzalez leading his teammate Joseba Beloki by :04 for the overall lead as the next riders from other teams were Armstrong in 8th and Tyler Hamilton of team CSC in 9th.

Stage 9 was an Individual Time Trial won by Santiago Botero and perhaps surprisingly seven riders finished within one minute of the stage winner when it was assumed by pundits that very few riders would keep Armstrong (who finished 2nd) that close and nobody would beat him. Following the ITT Gonzalez was still in Yellow leading the GC with Armstrong in 2nd overall, Beloki in 3rd and because of their strong performances in the ITT Serhiy Gonchar and Botero moved into 4th and 5th place in the General Classification.

Stage 10 was a hilly stage with a sprint finish won by Patrice Halgand of team Jean Latour. In places 2-11 were Jérôme Pineau of team Bonjour, Stuart O'Grady of Credit Agricole, Ludo Dierckxsens of Lampre, Pedro Horrillo of Mapei, Andy Flickinger of AG2R, Nicolas Vogondy of FDJ, Nico Mattan of Cofidis, Constantino Zaballa of Kelme, Enrico Cassani of Domo and Unai Extebarria of Euskadel.

Spanish team ONCE with Beloki, Gonzalez and Abraham Olano, and American team US Postal with Armstrong, a young Floyd Landis, Viatcheslav Ekimov and the dominant Spanish rider Roberto Heras, a former Vuelta a España champion, would have the battle for the 2002 Tour de France in the mountains.

In Stage 11 Laurent Jalabert lead the stage from kilometre 6 all the way until kilometre 155 when Armstrong caught and dropped him 3 km from the finish. US Postal controlled the pace of the Peloton for most of the race. Heras lead the way setting such a high pace that most of Armstrong's rivals were dropped before Armstrong even had to put in any work of his own, but when Armstrong finally did attack only his own teammate Heras and Beloki could stay with him, but before long Armstrong was on his own headed for the Yellow Jersey.

In Stage 12 Jalabert attacked early again with Isidro Nozal and Laurent Dufaux going with him. About halfway through the stage the chase-1 group was about 3:00 behind with Richard Virenque, Eddy Mazzoleni and Alexandre Botcharov while once again US Postal with George Hincapie at the front dictated the pursuit of the main field/peloton just over 4:00 behind Jalabert, who was once again caught less than 10 km from the finish after leading the race for most of the day.

Once again Heras fractured the group of the final ten elite riders left with only Armstrong and Beloki able to match his pace and once again when Armstrong launched his attack neither Heras or Beloki could go with him as they finished 2nd and 3rd to him 1:04 behind. Botero and Gonzalez were able to get within seven seconds of Heras and Beloki while Rumsas and Carlos Sastre finished about a minute and a half behind Armstrong.

Stage 13 was an intermediate stage and in the green jersey sprinters competition Erik Zabel and Robbie McEwen were only separated by one point. Laurent Jalabert's relentless attacks and combative riding was paying off as not only was he in the Polka Dot Jersey as King of the Mountains but he had also moved into a top 10 position in the overall standings. The stage was won by David Millar as the GC situation remained the same.

Armstrong would only build on his lead as the race progressed and by the time the Tour crossed Mont Ventoux, the Alps and arrived in Paris Beloki was still 2nd more than 7:00 behind as Rumsas completed the podium with Colombian rider Botero in 4th and Gonzalez in 5th. White Jersey winner Ivan Basso would finish 11th overall and would become one of the only serious challengers to Lance Armstrong in the coming Tours.

Following the USADA decision ten years later, which was confirmed by the UCI, Armstrong had this, and every result after 1998 vacated. It was also decided it was best for the sport and as an example to riders of future generations that the 2nd, 3rd and 4th place riders would not be moved up to 1st, 2nd and 3rd.

=== Doping ===
Subsequent to Armstrong's statement to withdraw his fight against United States Anti-Doping Agency's (USADA) charges, on 24 August 2012, the USADA said it would ban Armstrong for life and stripped him of his record seven Tour de France titles. Later that day it was confirmed in a USADA statement that Armstrong was banned for life and would be disqualified from any and all competitive results obtained on and subsequent to 1 August 1998, including forfeiture of any medals, titles, winnings, finishes, points and prizes. On 22 October 2012, the Union Cycliste Internationale endorsed the USADA sanctions, and decided not to award victories to any other rider or upgrade other placings in any of the affected events.

== Classification leadership and minor prizes ==
There were several classifications in the 2002 Tour de France. The most important was the general classification, calculated by adding each cyclist's finishing times on each stage. The cyclist with the least accumulated time was the race leader, identified by the yellow jersey; the winner of this classification is considered the winner of the Tour.

Additionally, there was a points classification, which awarded a green jersey. In the points classification, cyclists got points for finishing among the best in a stage finish, or in intermediate sprints. The cyclist with the most points lead the classification, and was identified with a green jersey.

There was also a mountains classification. The organisation had categorised some climbs as either hors catégorie, first, second, third, or fourth-category; points for this classification were won by the first cyclists that reached the top of these climbs first, with more points available for the higher-categorised climbs. The cyclist with the most points lead the classification, and wore a white jersey with red polka dots.

The fourth individual classification was the young rider classification, which was marked by the white jersey. This was decided the same way as the general classification, but only riders under 26 years were eligible.

For the team classification, the times of the best three cyclists per team on each stage were added; the leading team was the team with the lowest total time.

In addition, there was a combativity award given after each mass-start stage to the cyclist considered most combative, who wore a red number bib the next stage. The decision was made by a jury composed of journalists who gave points. The cyclist with the most points from votes in all stages led the combativity classification. Laurent Jalabert won this classification, and was given overall the super-combativity award.

There were also two special awards each with a prize of €3000, the Souvenir Henri Desgrange, given in honour of Tour founder and first race director Henri Desgrange to the first rider to pass the summit of the Col du Galibier on stage 16, and the Souvenir Jacques Goddet, given in honour of the second director Jacques Goddet to the first rider to pass the summit of the Col d'Aubisque on stage 11. Santiago Botero won the Henri Desgrange and Laurent Jalabert won the Jacques Goddet.

Classification leadership by stage
Stage	Winner	General classification	Points classification	Mountains classification	Young rider classification	Team classification	Combativity	
Stage	Winner	General classification	Points classification	Mountains classification	Young rider classification	Team classification	Award	Classification
P	~~Lance Armstrong~~	~~Lance Armstrong~~	~~Lance Armstrong~~	no award	David Millar	CSC–Tiscali	no award	
1	Rubens Bertogliati	Rubens Bertogliati	Erik Zabel	Christophe Mengin	Rubens Bertogliati	CSC–Tiscali	Stéphane Bergès	Stéphane Bergès
2	Óscar Freire	Rubens Bertogliati	Erik Zabel	Stéphane Bergès	Rubens Bertogliati	CSC–Tiscali	Sylvain Chavanel	Stéphane Bergès
3	Robbie McEwen	Erik Zabel	Erik Zabel	Christophe Mengin	Rubens Bertogliati	CSC–Tiscali	Jacky Durand	Jacky Durand
4	ONCE–Eroski	Igor González	Erik Zabel	Christophe Mengin	Isidro Nozal	ONCE–Eroski	no award	Jacky Durand
5	Jaan Kirsipuu	Igor González	Erik Zabel	Christophe Mengin	Isidro Nozal	ONCE–Eroski	Stefano Casagranda	Jacky Durand
6	Erik Zabel	Igor González	Erik Zabel	Christophe Mengin	Isidro Nozal	ONCE–Eroski	Steffen Wesemann	Jacky Durand
7	Bradley McGee	Igor González	Erik Zabel	Christophe Mengin	Isidro Nozal	ONCE–Eroski	Franck Rénier	Franck Rénier
8	Karsten Kroon	Igor González	Erik Zabel	Christophe Mengin	Isidro Nozal	ONCE–Eroski	Raivis Belohvoščiks	Franck Rénier
9	Santiago Botero	Igor González	Erik Zabel	Christophe Mengin	David Millar	ONCE–Eroski	no award	Franck Rénier
10	Patrice Halgand	Igor González	Robbie McEwen	Christophe Mengin	David Millar	ONCE–Eroski	Ludo Dierckxsens	Franck Rénier
11	~~Lance Armstrong~~	~~Lance Armstrong~~	Erik Zabel	Patrice Halgand	Ivan Basso	ONCE–Eroski	Laurent Jalabert	Laurent Jalabert
12	~~Lance Armstrong~~	~~Lance Armstrong~~	Erik Zabel	Laurent Jalabert	Ivan Basso	ONCE–Eroski	Laurent Jalabert	Laurent Jalabert
13	David Millar	~~Lance Armstrong~~	Robbie McEwen	Laurent Jalabert	Ivan Basso	ONCE–Eroski	Eddy Mazzoleni	Laurent Jalabert
14	Richard Virenque	~~Lance Armstrong~~	Robbie McEwen	Laurent Jalabert	Ivan Basso	ONCE–Eroski	Alexander Bocharov	Laurent Jalabert
15	Santiago Botero	~~Lance Armstrong~~	Robbie McEwen	Laurent Jalabert	Ivan Basso	ONCE–Eroski	Mario Aerts	Laurent Jalabert
16	Michael Boogerd	~~Lance Armstrong~~	Robbie McEwen	Laurent Jalabert	Ivan Basso	ONCE–Eroski	Michael Boogerd	Laurent Jalabert
17	Dario Frigo	~~Lance Armstrong~~	Robbie McEwen	Laurent Jalabert	Ivan Basso	ONCE–Eroski	Mario Aerts	Laurent Jalabert
18	Thor Hushovd	~~Lance Armstrong~~	Robbie McEwen	Laurent Jalabert	Ivan Basso	ONCE–Eroski	Léon van Bon	Laurent Jalabert
19	~~Lance Armstrong~~	~~Lance Armstrong~~	Robbie McEwen	Laurent Jalabert	Ivan Basso	ONCE–Eroski	no award	Laurent Jalabert
20	Robbie McEwen	~~Lance Armstrong~~	Robbie McEwen	Laurent Jalabert	Ivan Basso	ONCE–Eroski	Cristian Moreni	Laurent Jalabert
Final		~~Lance Armstrong~~	Robbie McEwen	Laurent Jalabert	Ivan Basso	ONCE–Eroski	Laurent Jalabert	

- In stage 1, Laurent Jalabert wore the green jersey.
- In stages 2 and 3, David Millar wore the white jersey.
- In stage 4, Robbie McEwen wore the green jersey.

== Final standings ==
Legend
Green jersey	Denotes the leader of the points classification	Polka dot jersey	Denotes the leader of the mountains classification
White jersey	Denotes the leader of the young rider classification	A white jersey with a red number bib.	Denotes the winner of the super-combativity award

=== General classification ===
Final general classification (1–10)
Rank	Rider	Team	Time
DSQ	~~Lance Armstrong (USA)~~	~~U.S. Postal Service~~	~~82h 05' 12"~~
2	Joseba Beloki (ESP)	ONCE–Eroski	+ 7' 17"
3	Raimondas Rumšas (LTU)	Lampre–Daikin	+ 8' 17"
4	Santiago Botero (COL)	Kelme–Costa Blanca	+ 13' 10"
5	Igor González (ESP)	ONCE–Eroski	+ 13' 54"
6	José Azevedo (POR)	ONCE–Eroski	+ 15' 44"
7	Francisco Mancebo (ESP)	iBanesto.com	+ 16' 05"
DSQ	~~Levi Leipheimer (USA)~~	~~Rabobank~~	~~+17' 11"~~
9	Roberto Heras (ESP)	U.S. Postal Service	+ 17' 12"
10	Carlos Sastre (ESP)	CSC–Tiscali	+ 19' 05"

Final general classification (11–153)
Rank	Rider	Team	Time
11	Ivan Basso (ITA)	Fassa Bortolo	+ 19' 18"
12	Michael Boogerd (NED)	Rabobank	+ 20' 33"
13	David Moncoutié (FRA)	Cofidis	+ 21' 08"
14	Massimiliano Lelli (ITA)	Cofidis	+ 27' 51"
15	Tyler Hamilton (USA)	CSC–Tiscali	+ 28' 36"
16	Richard Virenque (FRA)	Domo–Farm Frites	+ 28' 42"
17	Stéphane Goubert (FRA)	Jean Delatour	+ 29' 51"
18	Unai Osa (ESP)	iBanesto.com	+ 30' 17"
19	Nicolas Vogondy (FRA)	Française des Jeux	+ 32' 44"
20	Nicki Sørensen (DEN)	CSC–Tiscali	+ 32' 56"
21	Andrei Kivilev (KAZ)	Cofidis	+ 33' 41"
22	José-Luis Rubiera (ESP)	U.S. Postal Service	+ 36' 43"
23	Ivan Gotti (ITA)	Alessio	+ 40' 16"
24	Dariusz Baranowski (POL)	iBanesto.com	+ 43' 04"
25	Dario Frigo (ITA)	Saeco–Longoni Sport	+ 43' 15"
26	Laurent Brochard (FRA)	Jean Delatour	+ 44' 02"
27	Beat Zberg (SUI)	Rabobank	+ 44' 29"
28	Axel Merckx (BEL)	Domo–Farm Frites	+ 45' 39"
29	José Enrique Gutiérrez (ESP)	Kelme–Costa Blanca	+ 50' 59"
30	Alexander Bocharov (RUS)	AG2R Prévoyance	+ 51' 52"
31	Jörg Jaksche (GER)	ONCE–Eroski	+ 56' 05"
32	Jean-Cyril Robin (FRA)	Française des Jeux	+ 57' 35"
33	Marcos Antonio Serrano (ESP)	ONCE–Eroski	+ 1h 00' 52"
34	Laurent Lefèvre (FRA)	Jean Delatour	+ 1h 07' 00"
35	Christophe Brandt (BEL)	Lotto–Adecco	+ 1h 07' 50"
36	Sylvain Chavanel (FRA)	Bonjour	+ 1h 09' 26"
37	Bobby Julich (USA)	Team Telekom	+ 1h 13' 11"
38	Isidro Nozal (ESP)	ONCE–Eroski	+ 1h 13' 27"
39	Haimar Zubeldia (ESP)	Euskaltel–Euskadi	+ 1h 15' 39"
40	Volodymir Gustov (UKR)	Fassa Bortolo	+ 1h 17' 26"
41	Íñigo Chaurreau (ESP)	AG2R Prévoyance	+ 1h 17' 37"
42	Laurent Jalabert (FRA)	CSC–Tiscali	+ 1h 17' 48"
43	Piotr Wadecki (POL)	Domo–Farm Frites	+ 1h 18' 12"
44	Miguel Martinez (FRA)	Mapei–Quick-Step	+ 1h 18' 42"
45	Wladimir Belli (ITA)	Fassa Bortolo	+ 1h 19' 41"
46	Roberto Laiseka (ESP)	Euskaltel–Euskadi	+ 1h 20' 08"
47	Marzio Bruseghin (ITA)	iBanesto.com	+ 1h 26' 57"
48	Udo Bölts (GER)	Team Telekom	+ 1h 29' 32"
49	Íñigo Cuesta (ESP)	Cofidis	+ 1h 29' 59"
50	Mario Aerts (BEL)	Lotto–Adecco	+ 1h 31' 17"
51	Grischa Niermann (GER)	Rabobank	+ 1h 33' 03"
52	Patrice Halgand (FRA)	Jean Delatour	+ 1h 35' 38"
53	Andrea Peron (ITA)	CSC–Tiscali	+ 1h 39' 42"
54	Marco Velo (ITA)	Fassa Bortolo	+ 1h 39' 46"
55	Cédric Vasseur (FRA)	Cofidis	+ 1h 40' 52"
56	Kevin Livingston (USA)	Team Telekom	+ 1h 44' 51"
57	Santiago Blanco (ESP)	iBanesto.com	+ 1h 45' 09"
58	Viatcheslav Ekimov (RUS)	U.S. Postal Service	+ 1h 45' 51"
59	George Hincapie (USA)	U.S. Postal Service	+ 1h 47' 35"
60	David Etxebarria (ESP)	Euskaltel–Euskadi	+ 1h 48' 19"
61	Floyd Landis (USA)	U.S. Postal Service	+ 1h 48' 31"
62	László Bodrogi (HUN)	Mapei–Quick-Step	+ 1h 50' 05"
63	Gerhard Trampusch (AUT)	Mapei–Quick-Step	+ 1h 51' 30"
64	Serhiy Honchar (UKR)	Fassa Bortolo	+ 1h 52' 59"
65	Tomas Konečný (CZE)	Domo–Farm Frites	+ 1h 53' 26"
66	Cristian Moreni (ITA)	Alessio	+ 1h 54' 17"
67	Frédérick Bessy (FRA)	Crédit Agricole	+ 1h 58' 58"
68	David Millar (GBR)	Cofidis	+ 1h 59' 51"
69	Pavel Padrnos (CZE)	U.S. Postal Service	+ 2h 03' 10"
70	Eddy Mazzoleni (ITA)	Saeco–Longoni Sport	+ 2h 03' 46"
71	Ludovic Turpin (FRA)	AG2R Prévoyance	+ 2h 04' 50"
72	Rolf Aldag (GER)	Team Telekom	+ 2h 04' 56"
73	Víctor Hugo Peña (COL)	U.S. Postal Service	+ 2h 05' 24"
74	Marco Serpellini (ITA)	Lampre–Daikin	+ 2h 05' 55"
75	Gianluca Bortolami (ITA)	Saeco–Longoni Sport	+ 2h 06' 57"
76	Mikel Pradera (ESP)	ONCE–Eroski	+ 2h 07' 00"
77	Stuart O'Grady (AUS)	Crédit Agricole	+ 2h 07' 02"
78	Abraham Olano (ESP)	ONCE–Eroski	+ 2h 08' 25"
79	Bingen Fernandez (ESP)	Cofidis	+ 2h 08' 29"
80	Giuseppe Guerini (ITA)	Team Telekom	+ 2h 09' 26"
81	Serguei Ivanov (RUS)	Fassa Bortolo	+ 2h 10' 07"
82	Erik Zabel (GER)	Team Telekom	+ 2h 10' 33"
83	Sandy Casar (FRA)	Française des Jeux	+ 2h 12' 22"
84	David Latasa (ESP)	iBanesto.com	+ 2h 13' 01"
85	Franck Rénier (BEL)	Bonjour	+ 2h 15' 08"
86	Christophe Mengin (FRA)	Française des Jeux	+ 2h 16' 47"
87	Jérôme Pineau (FRA)	Bonjour	+ 2h 18' 24"
88	Iban Mayo (ESP)	Euskaltel–Euskadi	+ 2h 18' 27"
89	Benoît Joachim (LUX)	U.S. Postal Service	+ 2h 19' 27"
90	Anthony Morin (FRA)	Crédit Agricole	+ 2h 19' 55"
91	Marc Wauters (BEL)	Rabobank	+ 2h 20' 30"
92	Guennadi Mikhailov (RUS)	Lotto–Adecco	+ 2h 20' 39"
93	Denis Menchov (RUS)	iBanesto.com	+ 2h 21' 31"
94	Addy Engels (NED)	Rabobank	+ 2h 21' 37"
95	Javier Pascual (ESP)	iBanesto.com	+ 2h 22' 11"
96	Emmanuel Magnien (FRA)	Bonjour	+ 2h 22' 39"
97	Robert Hunter (SAF)	Mapei–Quick-Step	+ 2h 25' 32"
98	Thierry Loder (FRA)	AG2R Prévoyance	+ 2h 25' 35"
99	Steffen Wesemann (GER)	Team Telekom	+ 2h 30' 21"
100	Christophe Edaleine (FRA)	Jean Delatour	+ 2h 31' 03"
101	Gian Matteo Fagnini (ITA)	Team Telekom	+ 2h 32' 00"
102	Jérôme Bernard (FRA)	Jean Delatour	+ 2h 32' 19"
103	Andy Flickinger (FRA)	AG2R Prévoyance	+ 2h 33' 13"
104	Danilo Hondo (GER)	Team Telekom	+ 2h 34' 21"
105	Serge Baguet (BEL)	Lotto–Adecco	+ 2h 34' 24"
106	Andrea Tafi (ITA)	Mapei–Quick-Step	+ 2h 34' 34"
107	Pedro Horrillo (ESP)	Mapei–Quick-Step	+ 2h 35' 32"
108	Ludo Dierckxsens (BEL)	Lampre–Daikin	+ 2h 38' 44"
109	Bradley McGee (AUS)	Française des Jeux	+ 2h 39' 02"
110	Jens Voigt (GER)	Crédit Agricole	+ 2h 39' 35"
111	Francisco Cabello (ESP)	Kelme–Costa Blanca	+ 2h 40' 13"
112	Thor Hushovd (NOR)	Crédit Agricole	+ 2h 40' 43"
113	Cyril Dessel (FRA)	Jean Delatour	+ 2h 41' 24"
114	Franck Bouyer (FRA)	Bonjour	+ 2h 41' 42"
115	Stéphane Augé (FRA)	Jean Delatour	+ 2h 43' 14"
116	Constantino Zaballa (ESP)	Kelme–Costa Blanca	+ 2h 44' 30"
117	Walter Bénéteau (FRA)	Bonjour	+ 2h 45' 15"
118	Raivis Belohvoščiks (LAT)	Lampre–Daikin	+ 2h 46' 30"
119	Andrea Brognara (ITA)	Alessio	+ 2h 47' 10"
120	Paul Van Hyfte (BEL)	CSC–Tiscali	+ 2h 49' 20"
121	Nicola Loda (ITA)	Fassa Bortolo	+ 2h 49' 22"
122	José Vicente Garcia (ESP)	iBanesto.com	+ 2h 52' 44"
123	Nico Mattan (BEL)	Cofidis	+ 2h 55' 10"
124	Enrico Cassani (ITA)	Domo–Farm Frites	+ 2h 55' 24"
125	Jakob Piil (DEN)	CSC–Tiscali	+ 2h 55' 32"
126	Thierry Marichal (BEL)	Lotto–Adecco	+ 3h 00' 01"
127	Baden Cooke (AUS)	Française des Jeux	+ 3h 00' 22"
128	Martin Hvastija (SLO)	Alessio	+ 3h 00' 38"
129	Léon van Bon (NED)	Domo–Farm Frites	+ 3h 02' 46"
130	Robbie McEwen (AUS)	Lotto–Adecco	+ 3h 03' 30"
131	Ján Svorada (CZE)	Lampre–Daikin	+ 3h 03' 30"
132	Fabio Baldato (ITA)	Fassa Bortolo	+ 3h 04' 07"
133	Bram de Groot (NED)	Rabobank	+ 3h 04' 44"
134	José Angel Vidal (ESP)	Kelme–Costa Blanca	+ 3h 06' 37"
135	Mauro Radaelli (ITA)	Saeco–Longoni Sport	+ 3h 06' 43"
136	Erik Dekker (NED)	Rabobank	+ 3h 07' 56"
137	Servais Knaven (NED)	Domo–Farm Frites	+ 3h 09' 57"
138	Rubens Bertogliati (SUI)	Lampre–Daikin	+ 3h 10' 10"
139	Massimo Apollonio (ITA)	Saeco–Longoni Sport	+ 3h 10' 11"
140	Alessandro Cortinovis (ITA)	Lampre–Daikin	+ 3h 11' 10"
141	Unai Etxebarria (VEN)	Euskaltel–Euskadi	+ 3h 11' 18"
142	Gorka Arrizabalaga (ESP)	Euskaltel–Euskadi	+ 3h 12' 45"
143	Eddy Seigneur (FRA)	Jean Delatour	+ 3h 12' 49"
144	Christophe Agnolutto (FRA)	AG2R Prévoyance	+ 3h 13' 15"
145	Hans De Clercq (BEL)	Lotto–Adecco	+ 3h 14' 14"
146	Karsten Kroon (NED)	Rabobank	+ 3h 14' 51"
147	Sébastien Hinault (FRA)	Crédit Agricole	+ 3h 15' 10"
148	Anthony Langella (FRA)	Crédit Agricole	+ 3h 16' 54"
149	Davide Casarotto (ITA)	Alessio	+ 3h 16' 56"
150	Stéphane Bergès (FRA)	AG2R Prévoyance	+ 3h 20' 44"
151	Damien Nazon (FRA)	Bonjour	+ 3h 22' 25"
152	Arvis Piziks (LAT)	CSC–Tiscali	+ 3h 34' 57"
153	Igor Flores (ESP)	Euskaltel–Euskadi	+ 3h 35' 52"

=== Points classification ===
Final points classification (1–10)
Rank	Rider	Team	Points
1	Robbie McEwen (AUS)	Lotto–Adecco	280
2	Erik Zabel (GER)	Team Telekom	261
3	Stuart O'Grady (AUS)	Crédit Agricole	208
4	Baden Cooke (AUS)	Française des Jeux	198
5	Ján Svorada (CZE)	Lampre–Daikin	154
DSQ	~~Lance Armstrong (USA)~~	~~U.S. Postal Service~~	~~119~~
7	Thor Hushovd (NOR)	Crédit Agricole	103
8	Laurent Brochard (FRA)	Jean Delatour	99
9	Raimondas Rumšas (LTU)	Lampre–Daikin	92
10	Santiago Botero (COL)	Kelme–Costa Blanca	87

=== Mountains classification ===
Final mountains classification (1–10)
Rank	Rider	Team	Points
1	Laurent Jalabert (FRA)	CSC–Tiscali	262
2	Mario Aerts (BEL)	Lotto–Adecco	178
3	Santiago Botero (COL)	Kelme–Costa Blanca	162
DSQ	~~Lance Armstrong (USA)~~	~~U.S. Postal Service~~	~~159~~
5	Axel Merckx (BEL)	Domo–Farm Frites	121
6	Joseba Beloki (ESP)	ONCE–Eroski	115
7	Michael Boogerd (NED)	Rabobank	113
8	Richard Virenque (FRA)	Domo–Farm Frites	107
9	Carlos Sastre (ESP)	CSC–Tiscali	97
10	Raimondas Rumšas (LTU)	Lampre–Daikin	96

=== Young rider classification ===
Final young rider classification (1–10)
Rank	Rider	Team	Time
1	Ivan Basso (ITA)	Fassa Bortolo	82h 24' 30"
2	Nicolas Vogondy (FRA)	Française des Jeux	+ 13' 26"
3	Christophe Brandt (BEL)	Lotto–Adecco	+ 48' 32"
4	Sylvain Chavanel (FRA)	Bonjour	+ 50' 08"
5	Isidro Nozal (ESP)	ONCE–Eroski	+ 54.09"
6	Haimar Zubeldia (ESP)	Euskaltel–Euskadi	+ 56' 21"
7	Volodymir Hustov (UKR)	Fassa Bortolo	+ 58' 08"
8	Gerhard Trampusch (AUT)	Mapei–Quick-Step	+ 1h 32' 12"
9	David Millar (GBR)	Cofidis	+ 1h 40' 33"
10	Sandy Casar (FRA)	Française des Jeux	+ 1h 53' 04"

=== Team classification ===
Final team classification (1–10)
Rank	Team	Time
1	ONCE–Eroski	246h 36' 14"
2	U.S. Postal Service	+ 22' 49"
3	CSC–Tiscali	+ 30' 17"
4	iBanesto.com	+ 34' 06"
5	Cofidis	+ 36' 19"
6	Rabobank	+ 40.41"
7	Jean Delatour	+ 1h 17.21"
8	Kelme–Costa Blanca	+ 1h 42.22"
9	Domo–Farm Frites	+ 1h 46.20"
10	Fassa Bortolo	+ 2h 01.59"

=== Combativity classification ===
Final combativity classification (1–10)
Rank	Rider	Team	Points
1	Laurent Jalabert (FRA)	CSC–Tiscali	100
2	Franck Rénier (FRA)	Bonjour	50
3	Thor Hushovd (NOR)	Crédit Agricole	35
4	Michael Boogerd (NED)	Rabobank	33
5	Ludo Dierckxsens (BEL)	Lampre–Daikin	33
6	Mario Aerts (BEL)	Lotto–Adecco	31
7	Léon van Bon (NED)	Domo–Farm Frites	29
8	Stéphane Bergès (FRA)	AG2R Prévoyance	24
9	Sylvain Chavanel (FRA)	Bonjour	23
10	Axel Merckx (BEL)	Domo–Farm Frites	20

== Bibliography ==
- Augendre, Jacques (2016). Guide historique [Historical guide] (PDF) (in French). Paris: Amaury Sport Organisation. Archived (PDF) from the original on 17 August 2016.
- Nauright, John; Parrish, Charles (2012). Sports Around the World: History, Culture, and Practice. Vol. 2. Santa Barbara, California: ABC-CLIO. ISBN 978-1-59884-300-2.
- van den Akker, Pieter (2018). Tour de France Rules and Statistics: 1903–2018. Self-published. ISBN 978-1-79398-080-9.
