= 2003 GP Ouest-France =

Race details
- Dates: 24 August 2003
- Stages: 1
- Distance: 198 km (123.0 mi)
- Winning time: 4h 34' 22"

Results
	Winner	Andy Flickinger (FRA)	(AG2R Prévoyance)
	Second	Anthony Geslin (FRA)	(Brioches La Boulangère)
	Third	Nicolas Jalabert (FRA)	(Team CSC)

The 2003 GP Ouest-France was the 67th edition of the GP Ouest-France cycle race and was held on 24 August 2003. The race started and finished in Plouay. The race was won by Andy Flickinger of the AG2R Prévoyance team.

== General classification ==
Final general classification

Rank	Rider	Team	Time
1	Andy Flickinger (FRA)	AG2R Prévoyance	4h 34' 22"
2	Anthony Geslin (FRA)	Brioches La Boulangère	+ 0"
3	Nicolas Jalabert (FRA)	Team CSC	+ 0"
4	Christophe Mengin (FRA)	FDJeux.com	+ 0"
5	Kurt Asle Arvesen (NOR)	Team Fakta	+ 0"
6	Mark Scanlon (IRL)	AG2R Prévoyance	+ 0"
7	Joseba Albizu (ESP)	Mercatone Uno–Scanavino	+ 3"
8	Patrice Halgand (FRA)	Jean Delatour	+ 25"
9	Cédric Vasseur (FRA)	Cofidis	+ 1' 38"
10	Thor Hushovd (NOR)	Crédit Agricole	+ 1' 48"
