= Stéphane Bergès =

French cyclist

Personal information
- Born: 9 January 1975 (age 51) Senlis, France

Cycling career
- Sport: Cycling
- Current team: Retired
- Discipline: Road
- Role: Rider

Amateur team
- 1997: BigMat–Auber 93 (stagiaire)

Professional teams
- 1998–2000: BigMat–Auber 93
- 2001–2004: AG2R Prévoyance
- 2005–2006: Agritubel

Stéphane Bergès (born 9 January 1975 in Senlis) is a French former cyclist.

In his career, he competed in the 2001 and 2002 Tour de France, and most notably won a stage of the 2000 Tour Down Under.

== Major results ==
1997
1st Road race, National Under-23 Road Championships
1998
7th Overall Prudential Tour
1999
7th Paris–Bourges
9th Chrono des Herbiers
10th Overall Tour de l'Avenir
10th Overall Tour de la Region Wallonne
2000
1st Stage 3 Tour Down Under
3rd Overall Circuit de Lorraine
8th GP de Villers-Cotterêts
2003
1st Stage 3 Tour de Wallonie
8th GP de Villers-Cotterêts
9th Paris–Bourges
2005
7th Overall Tour du Poitou Charentes
10th Tour de Vendée
2006
3rd Duo Normand (with Florent Brard)
