= Stéphane Augé =

French cyclist (born 1974)

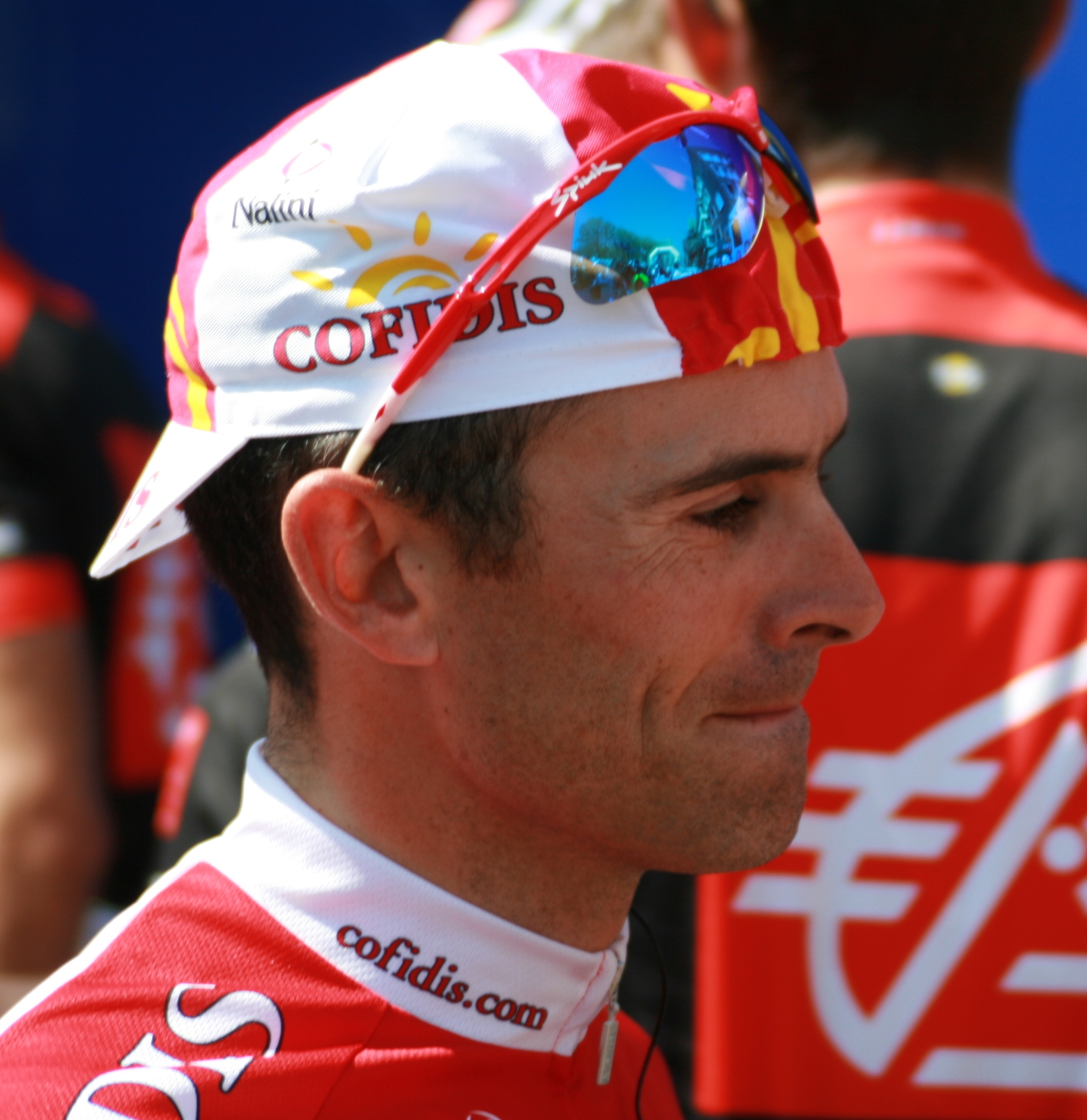

Personal information
- Full name: Stéphane Augé
- Born: 6 December 1974 (age 51) Pau, France
- Height: 1.74 m (5 ft 9 in)
- Weight: 65 kg (143 lb)

Cycling career
- Sport: Cycling
- Current team: Cofidis
- Discipline: Road
- Role: Sporting director

Amateur team
- 1999: VC Roubaix

Professional teams
- 2000–2001: Festina
- 2002: Jean Delatour
- 2003–2004: Crédit Agricole
- 2005–2010: Cofidis

Managerial team
- 2011–2016: Cofidis

Stéphane Augé (born 6 December 1974) is a French former road racing cyclist. Following his career, he worked as a sporting director for UCI Professional Continental team Cofidis from 2011 until 2016. While he initially had a contract to ride competitively with them in the 2011 season, he chose instead to retire as a cyclist and fill an opening in the team's management. He was known to be part of the breakaway in every first stage of the Tour de France.

== Major results ==
1999
1st Stages 2 & 9 Ruban Granitier Breton
2000
1st Stage 5 Tour du Poitou-Charentes
2001
3rd Bordeaux–Caudéran
7th A Travers le Morbihan
2002
1st Stage 6 Deutschland Tour
7th Tour de la Somme
2003
1st Mountains classification Circuit de la Sarthe
2006
1st Stage 3 Tour du Limousin
1st Stage 3 Tour de Pologne
2007
1st Cholet-Pays de Loire
8th Paris–Camembert
2008
1st Overall Four Days of Dunkirk

1st Stage 1

1st Stage 7 Deutschland Tour
5th Road race, National Road Championships
2009
8th Overall Four Days of Dunkirk
2010
3rd Grand Prix de Plumelec-Morbihan
9th Polynormande

=== Tour de France participation ===
- 2002 - 115th overall; 6th, Stage 8
- 2003 - DNF
- 2005 - 121st overall
- 2006 - 123rd overall
- 2007 - DNF; Stage 1 Combativity award; Stage 3-4 King of the Mountains leader
- 2008 - 139th overall
- 2009 - Stage 6 King of the Mountains leader
