= 2003 Vuelta a Asturias =

Race details
- Dates: 13–17 May 2003
- Stages: 5
- Distance: 830.4 km (516.0 mi)
- Winning time: 20h 45' 08"

Results
| Jersey awarded to the overall winner | Winner | Fabian Jeker (SUI) | (Milaneza–MSS) |
| | Second | Juan Miguel Mercado (ESP) | (iBanesto.com) |
| | Third | Hernán Buenahora (COL) | (05 Orbitel) |

The 2003 Vuelta a Asturias was the 47th edition of the Vuelta a Asturias road cycling stage race, which was held from 13 May to 17 May 2003. The race started and finished in Oviedo. The race was won by Fabian Jeker of the Milaneza–MSS team.

== General classification ==
Final general classification

| Rank | Rider | Team | Time |
|---|---|---|---|
| 1 | Fabian Jeker (SUI) | Milaneza–MSS | 20h 45' 08" |
| 2 | Juan Miguel Mercado (ESP) | iBanesto.com | + 27" |
| 3 | Hernán Buenahora (COL) | 05 Orbitel | + 46" |
| 4 | Santiago Botero (COL) | Team Telekom | + 1' 25" |
| 5 | David Arroyo (ESP) | ONCE–Eroski | + 1' 33" |
| 6 | Pedro Andrade Oliveira (POR) | LA Alumínios–Pecol–Bombarral | + 1' 34" |
| 7 | Samuel Sánchez (ESP) | Euskaltel–Euskadi | + 1' 36" |
| 8 | David Moncoutié (FRA) | Cofidis | s.t. |
| 9 | José Antonio Garrido (ESP) | Paternina–Costa de Almería | s.t. |
| 10 | Alberto López (ESP) | Euskaltel–Euskadi | + 1' 42" |
