= Stefano Casagranda =

Italian cyclist (1973–2025)

Personal information
- Born: 23 March 1973 Borgo Valsugana, Italy
- Died: 1 October 2025 (aged 52)

Cycling career
- Sport: Cycling
- Discipline: Road
- Role: Rider

Professional teams
- 1996: MG Maglificio–Technogym
- 1997: Scrigno–Gaerne
- 1998: Riso Scotti–MG Maglificio
- 1999: Amica Chips–Costa de Almería
- 2000–2003: Alessio
- 2004: Saeco

Stefano Casagranda (23 March 1973 – 1 October 2025) was an Italian racing cyclist, who competed as a professional from 1996 to 2004. He rode in 11 Grand Tours.

Casagranda died from cancer on 1 October 2025, at the age of 52.

== Major results ==
1996 (1 pro win)
1st Stage 5 Paris–Nice
1997
1st Stage 2 (TTT) Hofbrau Cup
1998 (1)
1st Stage 1 Giro del Trentino
2000 (1)
1st Stage 4 Vuelta a Castilla y León
2001 (1)
1st Stage 3 Danmark Rundt
3rd Clásica de Sabiñánigo
2002 (1)
1st Stage 1 Regio-Tour
3rd Gran Premio Industria e Commercio di Prato
2003
2nd Grand Prix Pino Cerami
3rd Grand Prix d'Ouverture La Marseillaise

=== Grand Tour general classification results timeline ===
Grand Tour	1996	1997	1998	1999	2000	2001	2002	2003	2004
Giro d'Italia	DNF	DNF	DNF	—	—	108	—	—	—
Tour de France	—	—	DNF	—	—	—	DNF	—	DNF
Vuelta a España	—	—	—	108	116	133	—	135	—

Legend
DNF	Did not finish
