= Jérôme Bernard =

French cyclist

Personal information
- Born: 21 September 1971 (age 55) Pierrelatte, France

Cycling career
- Sport: Cycling
- Current team: Retired
- Discipline: Road
- Role: Rider

Amateur team
- 1997: Festina (stagiaire)

Professional teams
- 1998: Mutuelle de Seine-et-Marne
- 1999: Home Market-Ville de Charleroi
- 2000–2003: Jean Delatour
- 2004: R.A.G.T. Semences

Jérôme Bernard (born 1971 in Pierrelatte) is a retired French racing cyclist. He rode two Tours of France in his career finishing 106th in 2001 and 102nd in 2002.

== Major results ==
1995
3rd Overall Trois Jours de Cherbourg
1998
1st Bol d'Air Creusois
1997
1st Boucles Catalanes
2001
1st Stage 1 Grand Prix du Midi Libre
2003
6th Overall Mi-Août en Bretagne
9th Overall Étoile de Bessèges
2008
9th Overall Tour de la Pharmacie Centrale

=== Grand Tour general classification results timeline ===
Grand Tour	1998	1999	2000	2001	2002	2003	2004
Giro d'Italia	Did not Race						
Tour de France	—	—	—	106	102	—	—
Vuelta a España	Did not Race						

Legend
—	Did not compete
DNF	Did not finish
