= Joseba Albizu =

Spanish cyclist

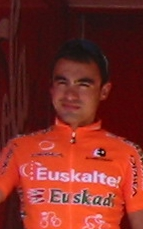
- Albizu in 2005

Personal information
- Full name: Joseba Albizu Lizaso
- Born: 6 July 1978 (age 48) Azpeitia, Spain
- Height: 1.71 m (5 ft 7 in)
- Weight: 61 kg (134 lb)

Cycling career
- Sport: Cycling
- Discipline: Road
- Role: Rider

Amateur team
- 1999–2002: Café Baques

Professional teams
- 2003: Mercatone Uno–Scanavino
- 2004–2006: Euskaltel–Euskadi

Joseba Albizu Lizaso (born 6 July 1978 in Azpeitia, Basque Country) is a Spanish former professional road bicycle racer, who rode professionally between 2003 and 2006 for the Mercatone Uno–Scanavino and Euskaltel–Euskadi teams. Albizu won the Giro del Friuli in 2003.

== Biography ==
He turned professional in 2003 with the Italian Mercatone Uno–Scanavino team. That year, he won the Giro del Friuli, his only professional victory.

In 2004, he joined the Euskaltel–Euskadi (1994–2013) team and took part in the 2004 Vuelta a España, his only major tour, which he did not finish.

He was involved in a traffic accident in October 2004 in which his friend Jokin Ormaetxea, a rider with the Paternina-Costa de Almería team, was killed when their car went off the road.

He stopped his professional career in 2006. After his retirement, he took part in endurance events, notably mountain biking, with the amateur MMR Powerade team.

In 2018, in mountain biking, he became European Mountain Bike Championships.

== Major results ==
2002
2nd Overall Giro Ciclistico d'Italia
2003
1st Overall Giro del Friuli
2nd Gran Premio Nobili Rubinetterie
7th GP Ouest–France
2005
1st Mountains classification Euskal Bizikleta
7th Subida a Urkiola
9th Gran Premio de Llodio
