= Patrice Halgand =

French cyclist (born 1974)

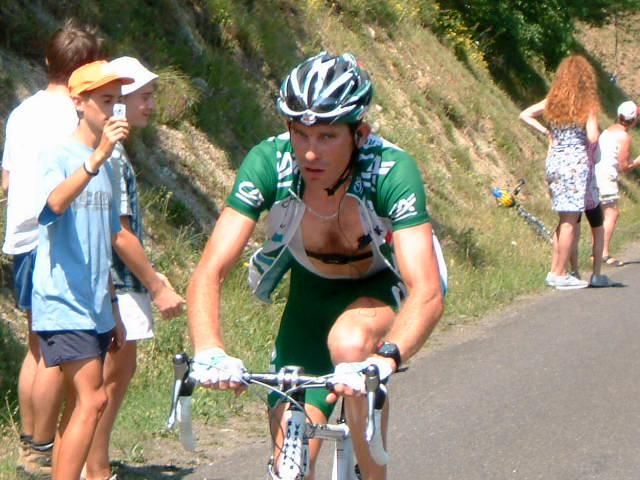
- Halgand on the Port de Pailhères in 2005

Personal information
- Full name: Patrice Halgand
- Born: 2 March 1974 (age 52) Saint-Nazaire, France
- Height: 1.79 m (5 ft 10 in)
- Weight: 67 kg (148 lb)

Cycling career
- Sport: Cycling
- Discipline: Road
- Role: Rider
- Rider type: Climber

Professional teams
- 1995–1999: Festina–Lotus
- 2000–2003: Jean Delatour
- 2004–2008: Crédit Agricole

Major wins
- Grand Tours Tour de France 1 individual stage (2002)

Patrice Halgand (born 2 March 1974) is a French former professional road racing cyclist. He was one of only three Festina team riders who were named as clean during the Festina doping scandal during the 1998 Tour de France.

Halgand announced his retirement on 28 December 2008.

== Major results ==
1995
5th Overall Tour de l'Avenir
10th Overall Tour du Limousin
1996
3rd National Cyclo-cross Championships
3rd Flèche Ardennaise
7th GP Villafranca de Ordizia
1997
1st Overall Étoile de Bessèges
1st Overall Vuelta Ciclista de Chile
8th Tour de Vendée
1998
4th Trophée des Grimpeurs
1999
1st A Travers le Morbihan
4th Trophée des Grimpeurs
2000
1st Overall Tour du Limousin

1st Stage 2

1st Trophée des Grimpeurs
1st A Travers le Morbihan
2nd GP Villafranca de Ordizia
2nd Boucles de l'Aulne
3rd Overall Route du Sud

1st Stage 3

5th Paris–Camembert
6th Paris–Bourges
8th Overall Regio-Tour

1st Stage 5

2001
1st Overall Regio-Tour

1st Stages 1 & 4

1st Boucles de l'Aulne
2nd GP Ouest–France
3rd Trofeo Melinda
3rd Tour de Vendée
4th Cholet-Pays de Loire
5th Trophée des Grimpeurs
5th Grand Prix d'Ouverture La Marseillaise
8th Overall Critérium International

1st Stage 2

8th Overall Tour du Limousin
8th Rund um den Henninger Turm
8th GP Chiasso
2002
1st Stage 10 Tour de France
1st Overall Tour du Limousin

1st Stage 1

1st Stage 4 Critérium du Dauphiné Libéré
1st Stage 1 Four Days of Dunkirk
3rd Road race, National Road Championships
4th GP de Villers-Cotterêts
4th Trophée des Grimpeurs
6th Overall Paris–Corrèze
9th Tour de Vendée
2003
3rd Road race, National Road Championships
3rd Classique des Alpes
4th Overall Paris–Corrèze
4th Overall Four Days of Dunkirk
4th Boucles de l'Aulne
6th Tour du Haut Var
7th A Travers le Morbihan
8th GP Ouest–France
9th Paris–Camembert
2004
5th Overall Route du Sud
10th Trophée des Grimpeurs
2005
1st Mountains classification, Paris–Corrèze
2nd GP Lugano
5th Tour du Haut Var
8th GP Chiasso
9th Overall Tirreno–Adriatico
10th Overall Route du Sud

1st Stage 4

10th Overall Étoile de Bessèges
10th Paris–Camembert
2006
Tour de l'Ain

1st Stage 4
1st Mountains classification

7th Overall Route du Sud

1st Stage 4

2007
1st Stage 4 Tour de l'Ain
3rd Road race, National Road Championships
5th Cholet-Pays de Loire
2008
1st Stage 5 Tour de Wallonie

=== Grand Tour general classification results timeline ===
Grand Tour	1997	1998	1999	2000	2001	2002	2003	2004	2005	2006	2007	2008
Giro d'Italia	DNF	—	—	—	—	—	—	—	23	14	DNF	—
Tour de France	—	—	—	—	55	52	40	39	52	47	30	—
Vuelta a España	—	—	—	48	—	—	—	—	—	—	—	DNF

Legend
—	Did not compete
DNF	Did not finish
