= Alexander Bocharov =

Russian cyclist

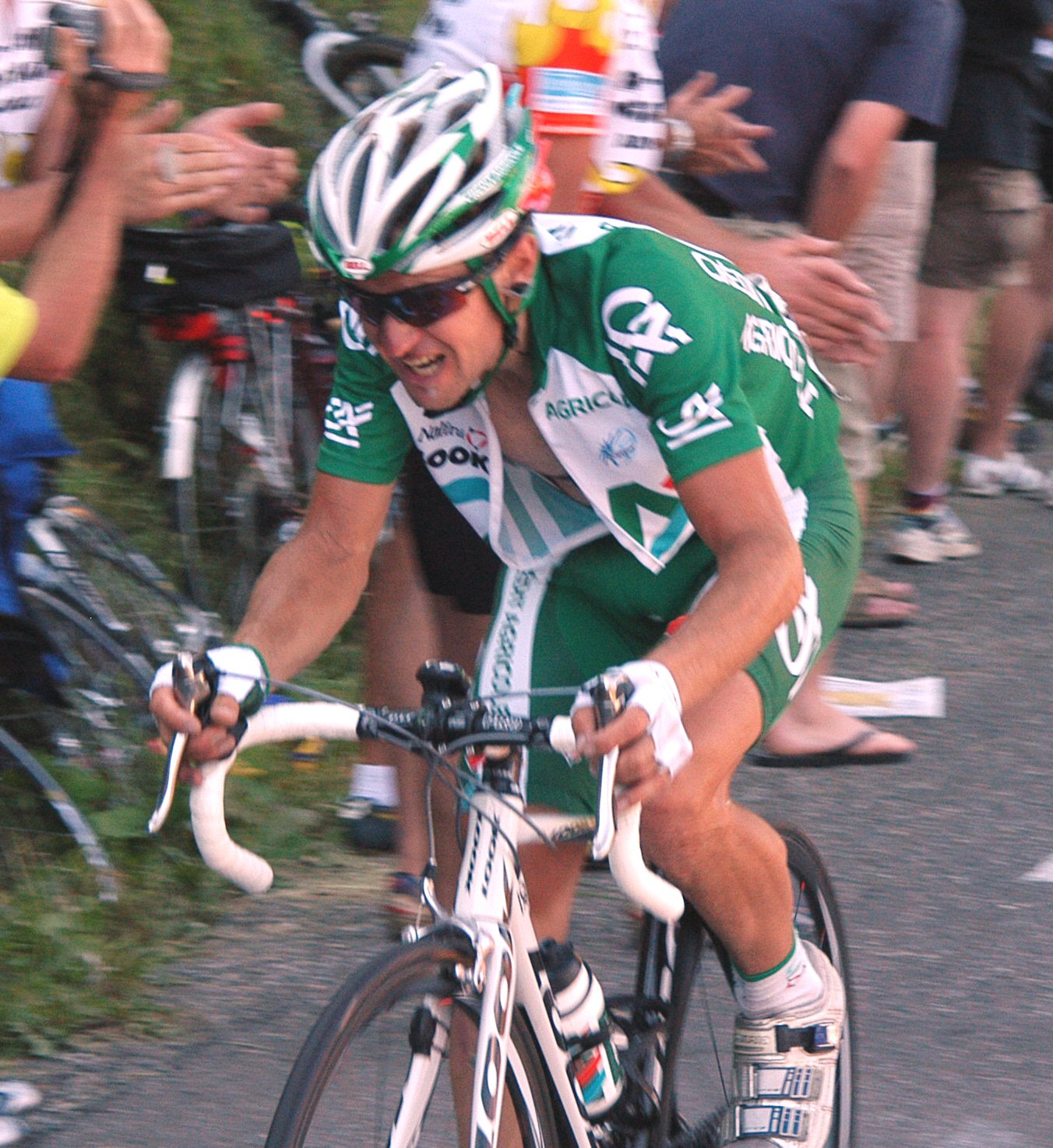

Personal information
- Full name: Alexander Bocharov; Александр Бочаров
- Born: 26 February 1975 (age 51) Irkutsk, Soviet Union
- Height: 1.64 m (5 ft 5 in)
- Weight: 54 kg (119 lb)

Cycling career
- Sport: Cycling
- Discipline: Road
- Role: Rider
- Rider type: Climber

Amateur team
- 1999: US Montauban

Professional teams
- 2000–2003: AG2R Prévoyance
- 2004–2008: Crédit Agricole
- 2009–2010: Team Katusha

Major wins
- Tour Méditerranéen (2008)

Alexander Bocharov (Russian: Александр Бочаров; born 26 February 1975 in Irkutsk; name also spelled Alexandre Botcharov), is a Russian professional road bicycle racer most recently riding for UCI ProTeam Team Katusha.

== Major results ==
1999
1st, Stage 9, Tour de l'Avenir
2001
17th, Tour de France

3rd, Stage 16

2002
14th, Midi Libre
15th, Critérium du Dauphiné Libéré
30th, Tour de France

2nd, Stage 14

2003
9th, Classique des Alpes
2004
8th, Classique des Alpes
2006
4th, Clasica San Sebastian
6th, Tour of Poland

4th, Stage 7

8th, World Championship
10th, Critérium International

2nd, Stage 2

11th, Tour de Suisse
2007
11th, Paris–Nice

5th, Stage 7

11th, Critérium International
20th, Vuelta al País Vasco
2008
1st, Tour Méditerranéen

1st, Stage 3

18th Overall, Tour de France
2010
1st, Stage 3, Tour du Limousin
