= Christophe Edaleine =

French cyclist

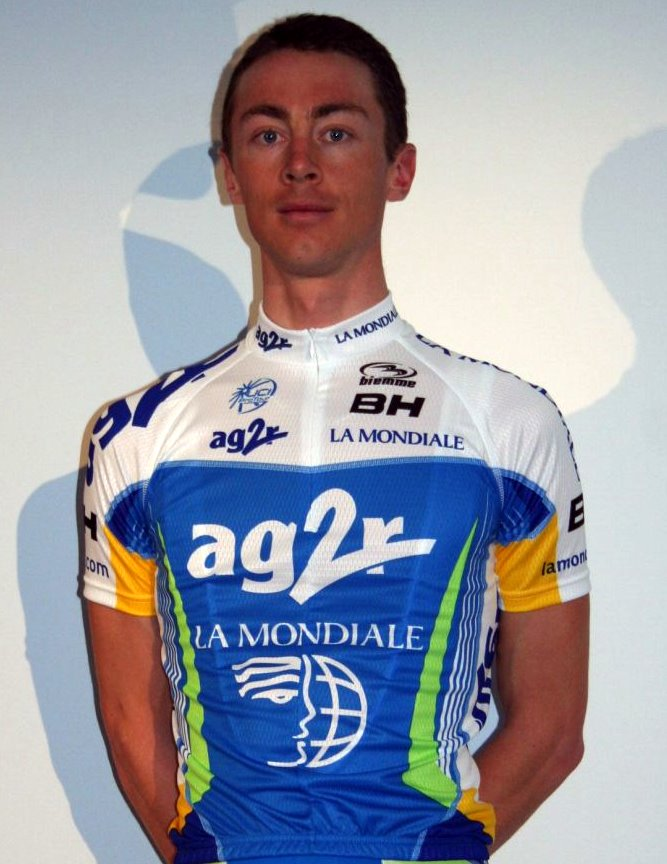

Personal information
- Full name: Christophe Edaleine
- Born: 1 November 1979 (age 46) Annonay, France
- Height: 1.77 m (5 ft 10 in)
- Weight: 62 kg (137 lb)

Cycling career
- Sport: Cycling
- Discipline: Road
- Role: Rider

Professional teams
- 2001–2003: Jean Delatour
- 2004–2005: Cofidis
- 2006–2007: Crédit Agricole
- 2008: Ag2r-La Mondiale

Christope Edaleine (born 1 November 1979 in Annonay, Ardèche) is a French former professional road bicycle racer. His riding career ended when Agritubel did not renew his contract at the end of the 2008 season.

In 2012 he directed a mixed team that won the team classification in the Tour Cycliste Féminin International de l'Ardèche and included Emma Pooley who won the general classification.

== Major results ==
2001
1st Overall Tour des Pays de Savoie
1st Mountains classification Étoile de Bessèges
5th Druivenkoers Overijse
5th Overall Tour de la Somme
2002
6th Tro-Bro Léon
7th Overall Bayern Rundfahrt
2003
1st Stage 7 Tour de l'Avenir
6th GP de Villers-Cotterêts
8th GP de Denain
10th Overall Grote Prijs Erik Breukink
2007
9th Overall Tour du Poitou Charentes et de la Vienne
10th Tour du Doubs
