= Rubens Bertogliati =

Swiss cyclist

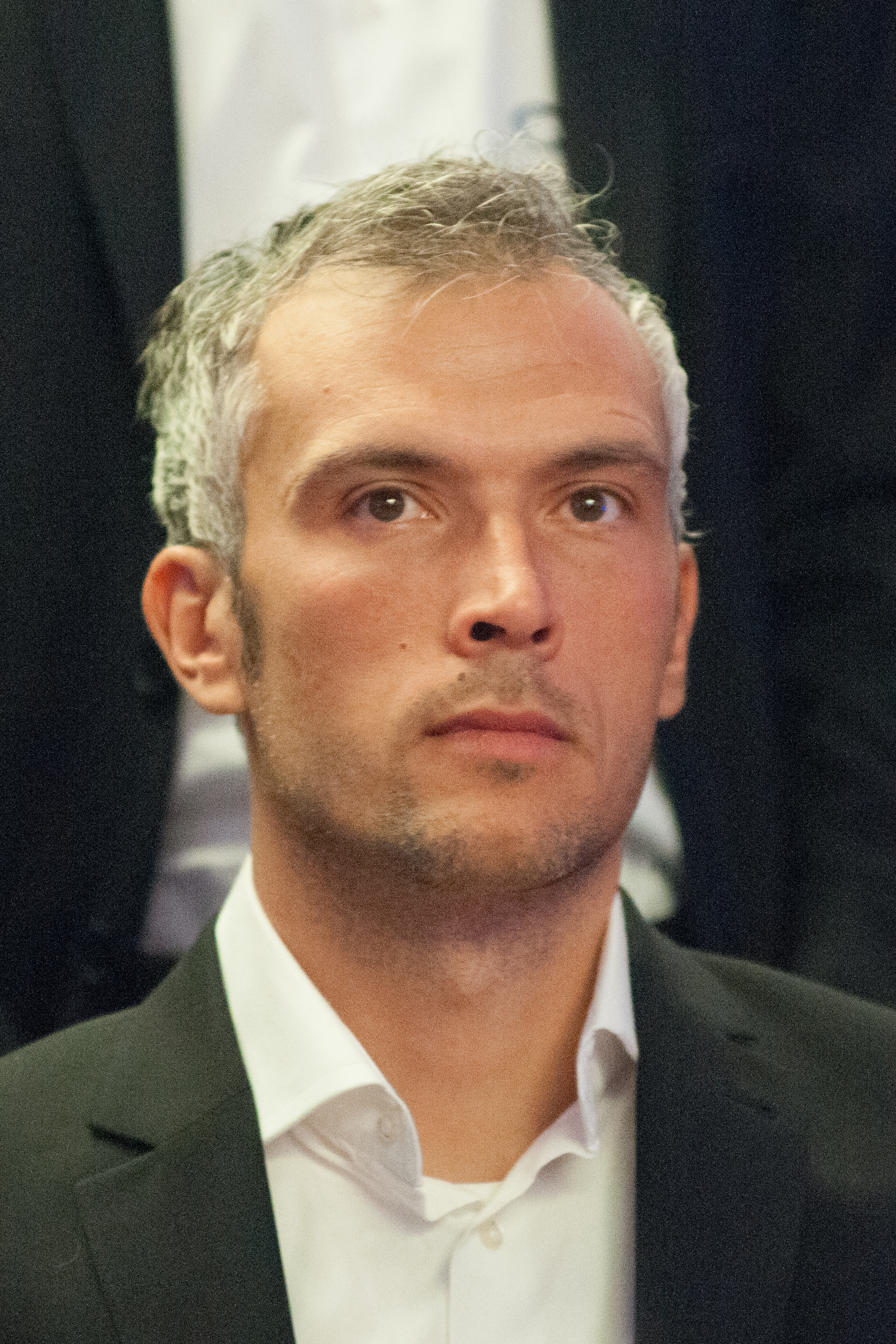
- Bertogliati in 2014

Personal information
- Full name: Rubens Bertogliati
- Born: 9 May 1979 (age 47) Lugano, Switzerland
- Height: 1.80 m (5 ft 11 in)
- Weight: 73.5 kg (162 lb; 11.57 st)

Cycling career
- Sport: Cycling
- Current team: Retired
- Discipline: Road
- Role: Rider
- Rider type: All-rounder

Professional teams
- 2000–2003: Lampre–Daikin
- 2004–2008: Saunier Duval–Prodir
- 2009–2010: Diquigiovanni–Androni
- 2011–2012: Team Type 1–Sanofi Aventis

Major wins
- Tour de France, 1 stage GP Chiasso (2001)

Rubens Bertogliati (born 9 May 1979 in Lugano) is a Swiss retired road racing cyclist, whose breakthrough came in the 2002 Tour de France, when he was riding for the Italian Lampre–Daikin team. In 2012, he rode for Team Novo Nordisk, and ended his career at the end of the season.

Bertogliati won the first stage of the Tour, which took place in the hilly country of Luxembourg. The victory also earned him the yellow jersey as leader of the general classification. He kept the jersey after stage two, when he finished in 29th position. After the third stage, German sprinter Erik Zabel took the leader's yellow jersey from Bertogliati.

Bertogliati's first win came a few months earlier at the GP Chiasso, but it was his efforts in July that made him famous. He started his career as a professional with the Lampre–Daikin team in 2000. From 2004 to 2008 he rode for the Spanish Saunier Duval–Prodir team.

== Major results ==
2001
3rd Time trial, National Road Championships
9th Grand Prix des Nations
2002
Tour de France

1st Stage 1
Held after Stages 1 and 2

1st GP Chiasso
3rd Time trial, National Road Championships
8th Japan Cup
2003
8th Overall International Tour of Rhodes
2005
10th Firenze–Pistoia
2007
4th Overall Tour de Georgia
6th Japan Cup
2008
5th Chrono des Nations
2009
1st Time trial, National Road Championships
7th Overall Circuit Cycliste Sarthe
2010
1st Time trial, National Road Championships
7th Chrono des Herbiers
2011
4th Time trial, National Road Championships
2012
8th Overall Tour of the Gila
