= David Latasa =

Spanish cyclist

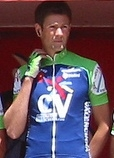

Personal information
- Full name: David Latasa Lasa
- Born: 14 February 1974 (age 52) Pamplona, Spain

Cycling career
- Sport: Cycling
- Role: Rider

Professional teams
- 1998–2000: Banesto
- 2001–02: iBanesto.com
- 2003: KELME-Costa Blanca
- 2004–06: Comunidad Valenciana

David Latasa Lasa (born 14 February 1974) is a Spanish retired road racing cyclist. He competed at the 2003 Tour de France.

== Results at the Grand Tours ==
=== Tour de France ===
- 2002: 84°
- 2003: 73°

=== Giro d'Italia ===
- 2001: 35°

=== Vuelta a España ===
- 2003: 46°
- 2004: 50°
- 2005: 71°
