= R.A.G.T. Semences =

French professional cycling team

Team information
- UCI code: RAG
- Registered: France
- Founded: 2000
- Disbanded: 2005
- Discipline: Road

Team name history
- 2000-2003 2004 2005: Jean Delatour; R.A.G.T. Semences-MG Rover; R.A.G.T. Semences

R.A.G.T. Semences was a French professional cycling team which existed from 2000 to 2005. It was created in 2000 as Jean Delatour, and started four times in the Tour de France(2001 to 2004), with two stage wins. The team was dissolved by the end of the 2005 season.

== Major wins ==
=== 2000 ===
Prologue Paris–Nice, Laurent Brochard
GP Ostenfester, Cyril Dessel
Stage 2b Critérium International, Laurent Brochard
Route Adélie, Laurent Brochard
Trophée des Grimpeurs, Patrice Halgand
A travers le Morbihan, Patrice Halgand
Stage 3 Route du Sud, Patrice Halgand
France Time Trial Championships, Francisque Teyssier
Stage 2 Tour de l'Ain, Samuel Plouhinec
Stage 5 Regio-Tour, Patrice Halgand
Overall Tour du Limousin, Patrice Halgand

Stage 2, Patrice Halgand

Paris–Bourges, Laurent Brochard
2nd Overall Paris–Nice, Laurent Brochard

=== 2001 ===
Stage 2 Tour de Normandie, Lénaïc Olivier
Stage 2 Critérium International, Patrice Halgand
Stage 1 Circuit de la Sarthe, Laurent Brochard
Paris–Camembert, Laurent Brochard
Stage 6a Circuit des Mines, Eddy Seigneur
Stage 1 GP du Midi Libre, Jérôme Bernard
Grand Prix de Villers-Cotterêts, Laurent Brochard
Stage 2 Criterium du Dauphiné Libéré, Laurent Roux
Stage 3 Route du Sud, Laurent Roux
Bulgaria Time Trial Championships, Ivailo Gabrovski
Tour du Doubs, Eddy Lembo
Overall Regio-Tour, Patrice Halgand

Stages 1 & 4, Patrice Halgand

Overall Tour de l'Ain, Ivailo Gabrovski

Stage 3, Christophe Oriol

Stage 4 Tour du Limousin, Gilles Bouvard
Circuit de l'Aulne, Patrice Halgand
Stage 1 Tour du Poitou Charentes, Ivailo Gabrovski

=== 2002 ===
- 1st, Stage 1, Tour du Limousin (Patrice Halgand)
- 1st overall, Tour du Limousin (Patrice Halgand)
- 1st, Grand Prix de Villers-Cotterêts (Laurent Lefèvre)
- 1st, A travers le Morbihan (Laurent Lefèvre)
- 1st, Stage 10, Tour de France (Patrice Halgand)

=== 2003 ===
- 1st, Stage 5, Critérium du Dauphiné (Laurent Lefèvre)
- 1st, Route Adélie (Sébastien Joly)
- 1st, Stage 20, Tour de France (Jean-Patrick Nazon)

=== 2004 ===
- 1st, Boucles de l'Aulne (Frédéric Finot)
