= Santiago Botero =

Colombian former professional road bicycle racer

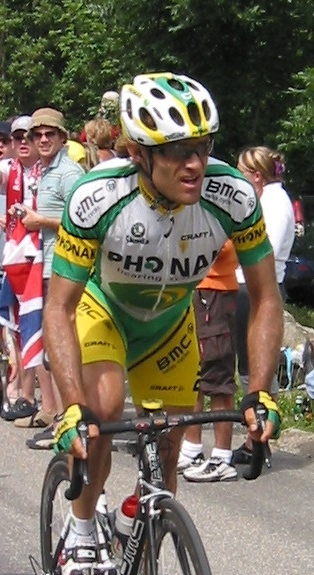
- Botero at the 2005 Tour de France

Personal information
- Full name: Santiago Botero Echeverry
- Nickname: The Buffalo from Medellín
- Born: October 27, 1972 (age 53) Medellín, Colombia
- Height: 1.75 m (5 ft 9 in)
- Weight: 75 kg (165 lb)

Cycling career
- Sport: Cycling
- Current team: Retired
- Discipline: Road
- Role: Rider
- Rider type: All-rounder

Amateur team
- 2009–2010: Indeportes Antioquia

Professional teams
- 1998–2002: Kelme–Costa Blanca
- 2003–2004: Team Telekom
- 2005–2006: Phonak
- 2007: UNE–Orbitel
- 2008: Rock Racing

Managerial team
- 2011–2012: Gobernación de Antioquia–Indeportes Antioquia

Major wins
- Grand Tours Tour de France Mountains classification (2000) 3 individual stages (2000, 2002) Vuelta a España 3 individual stages (2001, 2002) Stage races Tour de Romandie (2005) One-day races and Classics World Time Trial Championships (2002) National Time Trial Championships (2007, 2009)
Medal record
Representing Colombia
Men's road cycling
World Championships
Gold medal – first place	2002 Zolder	Time trial
Bronze medal – third place	2001 Lisbon	Time trial

Santiago Botero Echeverry (born October 27, 1972) is a Colombian former professional road bicycle racer. He was a pro from 1996 to 2010, during which he raced in three editions of the Tour de France and four editions of the Vuelta a España (the Tour of Spain). He is best known for winning the mountains' classification in the Tour de France, and the Time Trial World Championship 2002.

== Biography ==
=== Beginnings ===
Since childhood, he was very fond of bicycles, especially after his father, Alberto Botero, gave him a mountain bike, with which he practiced and began to compete in mountain bike races in Medellín. Although he was not a good academic student, he became one of the most important cyclists in Colombia.

Juan Darío Uribe, the sports doctor who discovered him and was his mentor in road cycling, says that he gave him the same effort test given to his other runners (some of them were Óscar de Jesús Vargas, Carlos Mario Jaramillo and Juan Diego Ramírez) on a stationary bike. The results were incredible. These pro riders hit 600 watts of power and nearly passed out. Santiago looked like a robot at this point in the test and hardly felt tired. “I realized that he had special conditions. None of the thousands of athletes from Indeportes Antioquia that he had studied showed such a level of strength,” said Dr. Uribe.

Uribe insisted that Botero should train in Europe and not in Colombia, so Santiago decided to go to that continent to make his professional debut in 1996 with the Spanish team Kelme.

== Career ==
He was, for the greater part of his career, a member of the Kelme–Costa Blanca team, but in 2003 joined Team Telekom. His performances as part of the Kelme dissipated in Team Telekom, with the team management blaming his lack of discipline in training, but he claimed health problems. In October 2004 he joined Phonak, together with Miguel Ángel Martín Perdiguero from Saunier Duval–Prodir, and Víctor Hugo Peña and Floyd Landis from U.S. Postal Service.

He lives in both Colombia and Madrid, Spain with his wife. Botero joined the American domestic team, Rock Racing, for the 2008 season. Botero finished his professional career riding for the Colombian team Indeportes Antioquia. He was also previously the manager of UCI Continental team Gobernación de Antioquia–Indeportes Antioquia.

=== Results ===
Born in Medellín, Colombia, Botero was the World Champion in the individual time trial in 2002. His career highlights include a stage win in the Vuelta a Andalucía in 1999, a stage wins in the Paris–Nice in 1999, a stage wins in the 2000 Tour de France, the mountains classification in the 2000 Tour de France, two stage wins in the Vuelta 2001, the third place in the World Championships in the individual time trial in 2001 and two stage wins and fourth place overall in the 2002 Tour de France. Other victories include a stage win in the Clasica Bogota in 1997, a prologue wins in the Vuelta a Chile in 1997 and a stage win in GP Mitsubishi in 1998. After joining T-Mobile his accomplishments in the Tour diminished sharply.

On May 1, 2005, he won the Tour de Romandie in Switzerland, 33 seconds ahead of rising Italian star and favorite for the Giro d'Italia Damiano Cunego. Romandie is often used as a preparation race for the Giro d'Italia. Botero carried that form into the 2005 edition of the Critérium du Dauphiné Libéré when he won the individual time trial ahead of Americans Levi Leipheimer and Lance Armstrong as well as winning the mountainous sixth stage which brought him into second overall in the general classification.

On February 28, 2007, Botero was presented with his new team UNE Orbitel in Bogota, Colombia. He outlined that his ambitions for the year would be to win the Vuelta a Colombia, to be the Colombian national champion and a podium place in the UCI World championships individual time trial event. In August, Botero won the Vuelta a Colombia for the first time in his career. He dominated the event by winning the prologue and two stages along the way as well as wearing the leaders jersey for most of the race.

=== Doping allegations ===
In 2006, Team Phonak dropped him on June 2 after he was named in media reports in the massive Operación Puerto doping probe in Spain, this just weeks before the start of the 2006 Tour de France. On October 2, 2006, Botero was cleared by the disciplinary committee of the Federación Colombiana de Ciclismo (Colombian Cycling Federation).

== Retirement ==
Botero retired from his professional career in 2010 and that same year was awarded by Coldeportes as one of the most outstanding sportspersons in Colombia.

The Colombian cyclist was 38 at the time of his retirement, working as a professional for 15 years, which has made him one of the best athletes in his country.

Botero is a business administrator graduated from Eafit University, in his country. He also studied service management at the University of Medellín.

== Career achievements ==
=== Major results ===
1998
4th Overall Tour de Romandie
8th Overall Vuelta a La Rioja
1999
2nd Overall Vuelta a Andalucía
3rd Overall Paris–Nice

1st Stage 4

4th Overall Setmana Catalana de Ciclisme
5th Overall Volta a la Comunitat Valenciana
2000
7th Overall Tour de France

1st Mountains classification
1st Stage 14

2001
1st Clásica a los Puertos de Guadarrama
Vuelta a España

1st Stages 7 (ITT) & 21 (ITT)

3rd Time trial, UCI Road World Championships
8th Overall Tour de France
9th Classique des Alpes
2002
1st Time trial, UCI Road World Championships
1st Classique des Alpes
1st Stage 16 Vuelta a España
1st Stage 3 (ITT) Critérium du Dauphiné Libéré
4th Overall Tour de France

1st Stages 9 (ITT) & 15

2003
3rd Overall Clásica Internacional de Alcobendas
4th Overall Vuelta a Asturias
2004
7th Time trial, Olympic Games
2005
1st Overall Tour de Romandie

1st Stage 5 (ITT)

2nd Overall Critérium du Dauphiné Libéré

1st Stages 3 (ITT) & 6

2006
2nd Overall Volta a Catalunya
2007
1st Time trial, National Road Championships
1st Overall Vuelta a Colombia

1st Prologue, Stages 6 & 14 (ITT)

2008
1st Prologue Vuelta a Colombia
6th Road race, Olympic Games
2009
1st Time trial, National Road Championships
1st Stage 7 (ITT) Vuelta a Colombia
2010
5th Overall Tour de San Luis

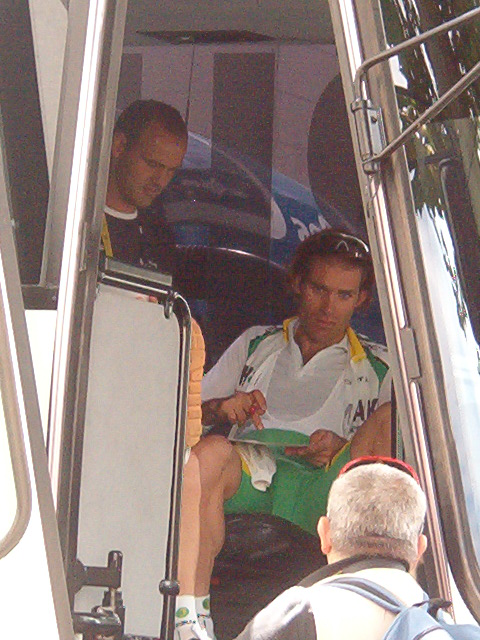
Santiago Botero at the Tour de France 2005 in the Phonak bus

=== Grand Tour general classification results timeline ===
Grand Tour	1997	1998	1999	2000	2001	2002	2003	2004	2005
Giro d'Italia	—	54	—	—	—	—	—	—	—
Tour de France	—	—	—	7	8	4	DNF	75	51
Vuelta a España	98	—	—	72	18	66	—	DNF	DNF

Legend
—	Did not compete
DNF	Did not finish
