= Christophe Mengin =

French cyclist

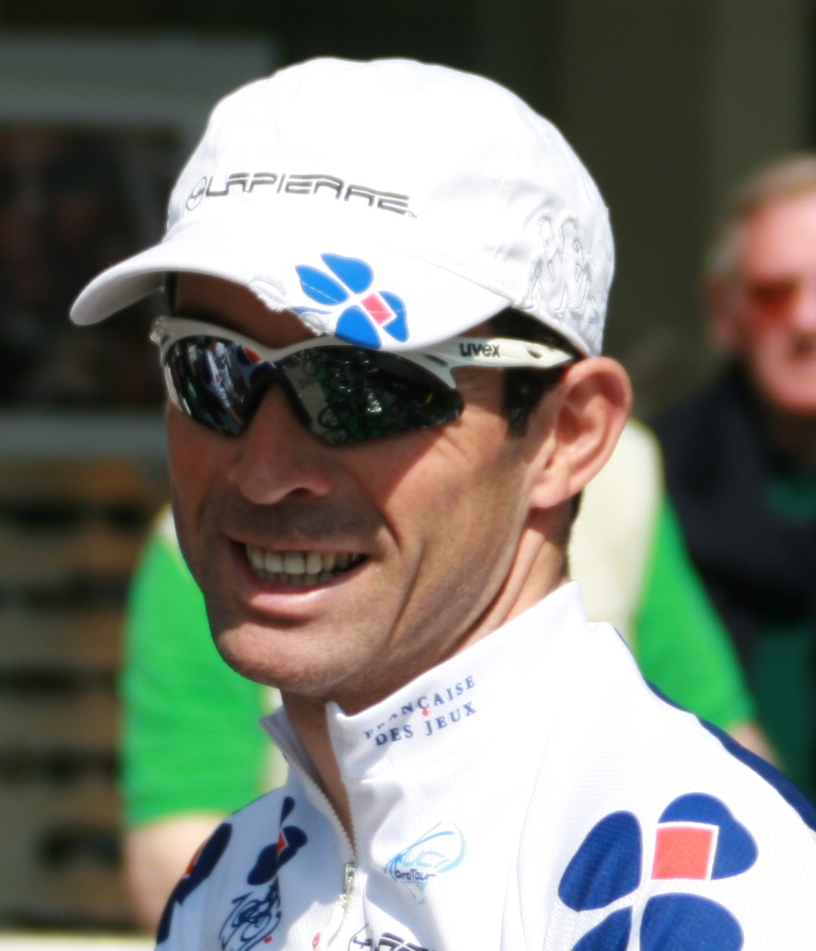

Personal information
- Full name: Christophe Mengin
- Born: September 3, 1968 (age 58) Cornimont, France
- Height: 1.73 m (5 ft 8 in)
- Weight: 68 kg (150 lb; 10 st 10 lb)

Cycling career
- Sport: Cycling
- Current team: Retired
- Disciplines: Road, formerly cyclo-cross
- Role: Rider

Professional teams
- 1995: Chazal
- 1996: Petit Casino
- 1997–2008: Française des Jeux

Major wins
- Grand Tours Tour de France 1 individual stage (1997) National Cyclo-cross Championships (1997, 1998) GP Ouest France (1999) GP Cholet-Pays de Loire (2003)
Medal record
Men's road bicycle racing
Representing France
World Championships
Bronze medal – third place	1994 Agrigento	Amateur road race

Christophe Mengin (born 3 September 1968) is a retired French racing cyclist and a former cyclo-cross racer. He became professional in 1995, signing to the Chazal team, and retired after the 2008 season. His height is 1.73 m, and weight is 68 kg.

== Major results ==
1988
U23 National cyclo-cross champion
1990
1st Grand Prix Adrie van der Poel
1991
1st Manx International GP
1993
6th Overall Course de la Paix

1st Stage 8

8th Mediterranean Games RR
1994
1st Overall Circuit de Lorraine
3rd World Amateur Road race
3rd Overall Rothaus Regio Tour
4th Overall Österreich-Rundfahrt

1st Stage 3

1995
2nd GP de la Ville de Rennes
4th Paris–Camembert
9th Grand Prix de Plumelec-Morbihan
1996
6th Overall Tour de Picardie
1997
National cyclo-cross champion
1st Stage 16 Tour de France
1st Stage 1 Driedaagse van De Panne-Koksijde
5th Overall 4 Jours de Dunkerque
5th Overall Circuit de Lorraine
7th Omloop Het Volk
10th De Brabantse Pijl
1998
National cyclo-cross champion
1st Grand Prix Adrie van der Poel
1st Stage 3 Vuelta a Castilla y León
6th Cyclassics Hamburg
7th De Brabantse Pijl
10th Classic Haribo
1999
1st GP Ouest France - Plouay
4th Kuurne–Brussels–Kuurne
2000
9th Giro Provincia di Siracusa
2001
5th Route Adélie de Vitré
7th Cholet-Pays de Loire
2002
6th Overall Tour of Qatar
2003
1st Cholet-Pays de Loire
4th GP Ouest France - Plouay
7th Overall Driedaagse van De Panne-Koksijde
7th GP de Villers-Cotterêts
8th Overall Tour de Picardie
2004
2nd Tro-Bro Léon
2006
9th Paris–Roubaix
9th Overall La Tropicale Amissa Bongo
2007
1st Stage 4 Étoile de Bessèges
5th Gent–Wevelgem
2008
3rd Boucles de l'Aulne
