= Regio-Tour =

Cycling race in Europe

Rothaus Regio-Tour
Race details
- Date: August
- Region: France, Germany, Switzerland
- English name: Regio-Tour
- Local name: Regio-Tour (in German)
- Discipline: Road
- Competition: UCI Europe Tour
- Type: Stage-race

History
- First edition: 1985
- Editions: 25 (as of 2009)
- First winner: Uli Rottler (GER)
- Most wins: Laurent Brochard (FRA) (2 wins)
- Most recent: Moisés Dueñas (ESP)

The Regio-Tour is a multi-stage road bicycle race held between France, Switzerland and Germany. It was first held in 1985 and since 2005 it has been organised as a 2.1 event on the UCI Europe Tour. Famous riders like Laurent Brochard, Jan Ullrich, Alexander Vinokourov, Andreas Klöden, Mario Cipollini and Viatcheslav Ekimov have won the race.

Since 2002 it has been called Rothaus Regio-Tour due to sponsorship.

There was no professional edition since 2008 and the tour was since then just held a junior race.

== Winners ==
Year	Country	Rider	Team
1985	West Germany	Uli Rottler	
1986	Italy	Flavio Vanzella	
1987	Italy	Mario Cipollini	
1988	Soviet Union	Viatcheslav Ekimov	
1989	West Germany	Falk Boden	
1990	Soviet Union	Alexandre Chefer	
1991	Germany	Alexander Kastenhuber	
1992	Latvia	Dainis Ozols	
1993	France	Pascal Hervé	
1994	France	Laurent Brochard	Castorama
1995	Italy	Roberto Pistore	Polti
1996	Germany	Jan Ullrich	Team Telekom
1997	Russia	Viatcheslav Djavanian	Roslotto
1998	Italy	Mirko Celestino	Polti
1999	Germany	Grischa Niermann	Rabobank
2000	Italy	Filippo Simeoni	Amica Chips
2001	France	Patrice Halgand	Jean Delatour
2002	France	Laurent Brochard	Jean Delatour
2003	Ukraine	Volodymir Gustov	Fassa Bortolo
2004	Kazakhstan	Alexandre Vinokourov	T-Mobile Team
2005	Belgium	Nico Sijmens	Landbouwkrediet-Colnago
2006	Germany	Andreas Klöden	T-Mobile Team
2007	Spain	Moisés Dueñas	Agritubel
2008	Germany	Björn Schröder	Team Milram
