= Grand Prix de Villers-Cotterêts =

Race details
- Date: April–May
- Region: Villers-Cotterêts, France
- English name: Grand Prix of Villers-Cotterêts
- Local name(s): Grand Prix de Villers-Cotterêts (in French)
- Discipline: Road race
- Competition: UCI Europe Tour
- Type: Single-day

History
- First edition: 1998
- Editions: 9
- Final edition: 2006
- First winner: Jaan Kirsipuu (EST)
- Final winner: Emilien-Benoît Bergès (FRA)

The Grand Prix de Villers-Cotterêts was a single-day road bicycle race held annually in the commune of Villers-Cotterêts, France from 1998 until 2008. In 2005 and 2006, the race was organized as a 1.1 event on the UCI Europe Tour, and was also part of the Coupe de France de cyclisme sur route. In 2007 the race did not take place.

== Winners ==
Year	Country	Rider	Team
1998	Estonia	Jaan Kirsipuu	
1999	France	Cyril Saugrain	
2000	France	Damien Nazon	
2001	France	Laurent Brochard	
2002	France	Laurent Lefèvre	
2003	Great Britain	Julian Winn	
2004	Australia	Stuart O'Grady	
2005	Australia	Bradley McGee	
2006	France	Emilien-Benoît Bergès	
