= List of teams and cyclists in the 2006 Giro d'Italia =

As Giro d'Italia is part of UCI ProTour, 20 ProTour teams start the race. Wild cards were given to Ceramica Panaria–Navigare and Selle Italia–Diquigiovanni.

== Official start list ==
=== Discovery Channel (DSC) ===
| No | Name | Nationality | Final GC place |
|---|---|---|---|
| 1 | Paolo Savoldelli | Italy | 5 : Maglia blu |
| 2 | Tom Danielson | United States | Abandoned race after Stage 19 (Sinusitis and Fever) |
| 3 | Manuel Beltrán | Spain | 22 |
| 4 | Viatcheslav Ekimov | Russia | 89 |
| 5 | Benoît Joachim | Luxembourg | 83 |
| 6 | Jason McCartney | United States | 135 |
| 7 | Pavel Padrnos | Czech Republic | 67 |
| 8 | José Luis Rubiera | Spain | 13 |
| 9 | Matt White | Australia | 102 |

=== AG2r Prévoyance (A2R) ===
| No | Name | Nationality | Final GC place |
|---|---|---|---|
| 11 | Sylvain Calzati | France | 79 |
| 12 | Íñigo Chaurreau | Spain | 54 |
| 13 | Renaud Dion | France | 104 |
| 14 | Hubert Dupont | France | 32 |
| 15 | John Gadret | France | Abandoned race during Stage 18 (Broken collarbone) |
| 16 | Yuriy Krivtsov | Ukraine | 114 |
| 17 | Carl Naibo | France | 150 |
| 18 | Mark Scanlon | Ireland | Abandoned race during Stage 12 |
| 19 | Tomas Vaitkus | Lithuania | Abandoned race during Stage 13 |

=== Bouygues Télécom (BTL) ===
| No | Name | Nationality | Final GC place |
|---|---|---|---|
| 21 | Giovanni Bernaudeau | France | Abandoned race after Stage 13 |
| 22 | Sébastien Chavanel | France | Abandoned race during Stage 7 |
| 23 | Stef Clement | Netherlands | 64 |
| 24 | Olivier Bonnaire | France | 115 |
| 25 | Andy Flickinger | France | Abandoned race after Stage 11 |
| 26 | Yohann Gène | France | 149 |
| 27 | Arnaud Labbe | France | 116 |
| 28 | Yoann Le Boulanger | France | 119 |
| 29 | Laurent Lefèvre | France | 50 |

=== Caisse d'Epargne–Illes Balears (CEI) ===
| No | Name | Nationality | Final GC place |
|---|---|---|---|
| 31 | José Luis Carrasco | Spain | 68 |
| 32 | Vladimir Efimkin | Russia | 39 |
| 33 | Imanol Erviti | Spain | 81 |
| 34 | Marco Fertonani | Italy | Abandoned race during Stage 18 |
| 35 | Iván Gutiérrez | Spain | 24 |
| 36 | Joan Horrach | Spain | 36 |
| 37 | José Cayetano Juliá | Spain | 118 |
| 38 | Mikel Pradera | Spain | 95 |
| 39 | Francisco Perez | Spain | 28 |

=== Ceramica Panaria – Navigare (PAN) ===
| No | Name | Nationality | Final GC place |
|---|---|---|---|
| 41 | Emanuele Sella | Italy | 26 |
| 42 | Luca Mazzanti | Italy | 20 |
| 43 | Moisés Aldape | Mexico | Abandoned race after Stage 13 |
| 44 | Fortunato Baliani | Italy | 46 |
| 45 | Miguel Ángel Rubiano | Colombia | 103 |
| 46 | Sergiy Matveyev | Ukraine | 142 |
| 47 | Julio Alberto Pérez Cuapio | Mexico | 42 |
| 48 | Maximiliano Richeze | Argentina | 138 |
| 49 | Luis Felipe Laverde | Colombia | 49 |

=== Cofidis (COF) ===
| No | Name | Nationality | Final GC place |
|---|---|---|---|
| 51 | Leonardo Bertagnolli | Italy | Abandoned race during Stage 4 |
| 52 | Leonardo Duque | Colombia | 47 |
| 53 | Thierry Marichal | Belgium | Abandoned race during Stage 7 |
| 54 | Amaël Moinard | France | 112 |
| 55 | Maxime Monfort | Belgium | 33 |
| 56 | Cristian Moreni | Italy | Abandoned race during Stage 7 |
| 57 | Iván Parra | Colombia | 16 |
| 58 | Staf Scheirlinckx | Belgium | Abandoned race during Stage 14 (Broken collarbone) |
| 59 | Rik Verbrugghe | Belgium | Abandoned race after Stage 15 |

=== Crédit Agricole (C.A) ===
| No | Name | Nationality | Final GC place |
|---|---|---|---|
| 61 | Francesco Bellotti | Italy | 41 |
| 62 | Alexander Bocharov | Russia | 27 |
| 63 | William Bonnet | France | 111 |
| 64 | Christophe Edaleine | France | 127 |
| 65 | Patrice Halgand | France | 14 |
| 66 | Rémi Pauriol | France | 122 |
| 67 | Benoît Poilvet | France | 99 |
| 68 | Yannick Talabardon | France | 100 |
| 69 | Nicolas Vogondy | France | 44 |

=== Davitamon–Lotto (DVL) ===
| No | Name | Nationality | Final GC place |
|---|---|---|---|
| 71 | Christophe Brandt | Belgium | Abandoned race after Stage 3 (Cracked elbow) |
| 72 | Nick Gates | Australia | 131 |
| 73 | Josep Jufré | Spain | 29 |
| 74 | Jan Kuyckx | Belgium | 133 |
| 75 | Robbie McEwen | Australia | Abandoned race after Stage 12 (Stomach illness) |
| 76 | Preben Van Hecke | Belgium | 140 |
| 77 | Wim Van Huffel | Belgium | 17 |
| 78 | Henk Vogels | Australia | 145 |
| 79 | Bert Roesems | Belgium | 123 |

=== Euskaltel–Euskadi (EUL) ===
| No | Name | Nationality | Final GC place |
|---|---|---|---|
| 81 | Beñat Albizuri | Spain | 144 |
| 82 | Andoni Aranaga | Spain | Abandoned race during Stage 14 |
| 83 | Koldo Fernández | Spain | Abandoned race during Stage 7 |
| 84 | Iker Flores Galarza | Spain | 35 |
| 85 | Markel Irizar | Spain | 90 |
| 86 | Roberto Laiseka | Spain | Abandoned race during Stage 12 (Injuries due to crash) |
| 87 | David López | Spain | 40 |
| 88 | Anton Luengo | Spain | 110 |
| 89 | Ivan Mayoz | Spain | 128 |

=== Française des Jeux (FDJ) ===
| No | Name | Nationality | Final GC place |
|---|---|---|---|
| 91 | Bradley McGee | Australia | Abandoned race during Stage 10 (Back pain) |
| 92 | Sandy Casar | France | 6 |
| 93 | Carlos da Cruz | France | 101 |
| 94 | Mickaël Delage | France | 129 |
| 95 | Arnaud Gérard | France | 143 |
| 96 | Philippe Gilbert | Belgium | Abandoned race after Stage 11 (Resigned) |
| 97 | Gustav Larsson | Sweden | 66 |
| 98 | Cyrille Monnerais | France | 121 |
| 99 | Jussi Veikkanen | Finland | 70 |

=== Gerolsteiner (GST) ===
| No | Name | Nationality | Final GC place |
|---|---|---|---|
| 101 | Robert Förster | Germany | 139 |
| 102 | Torsten Hiekmann | Germany | 85 |
| 103 | Sven Krauss | Germany | 97 |
| 104 | Andrea Moletta | Italy | 78 |
| 105 | Volker Ordowski | Germany | Abandoned race during Stage 19 |
| 106 | Davide Rebellin | Italy | Abandoned race after Stage 10 (Broken rib) |
| 107 | Matthias Russ | Germany | 74 |
| 108 | Ronny Scholz | Germany | Abandoned race during Stage 14 |
| 109 | Stefan Schumacher | Germany | 76 |

=== Lampre–Fondital (LAM) ===
| No | Name | Nationality | Final GC place |
|---|---|---|---|
| 111 | Damiano Cunego | Italy | 4 |
| 112 | Marzio Bruseghin | Italy | 25 |
| 113 | Paolo Fornaciari | Italy | 126 |
| 114 | Evgeni Petrov | Russia | 57 |
| 115 | Gorazd Štangelj | Slovenia | 59 |
| 116 | Sylvester Szmyd | Poland | 19 |
| 117 | Paolo Tiralongo | Italy | 15 |
| 118 | Tadej Valjavec | Slovenia | 34 |
| 119 | Francisco J. Vila Errandonea | Spain | 10 |

=== Liberty Seguros–Würth (LSW) ===
| No | Name | Nationality | Final GC place |
|---|---|---|---|
| 121 | Dariusz Baranowski | Poland | Abandoned race during Stage 10 (Gastroenteritis) |
| 122 | Giampaolo Caruso | Italy | 12 |
| 123 | Koen de Kort | Netherlands | 124 |
| 124 | Daniel Navarro | Spain | 91 |
| 125 | Unai Osa | Spain | 18 |
| 126 | Javier Ramírez | Spain | 82 |
| 127 | Michele Scarponi | Italy | Abandoned race after Stage 16 |
| 128 | Marcos Serrano | Spain | Abandoned race after Stage 12 |
| 129 | Serguei Yakovlev | Kazakhstan | Abandoned race during Stage 18 |

=== Liquigas (LIQ) ===
| No | Name | Nationality | Final GC place |
|---|---|---|---|
| 131 | Danilo Di Luca | Italy | 23 |
| 132 | Patrick Calcagni | Switzerland | 107 |
| 133 | Dario Cioni | Italy | 86 |
| 134 | Dario Andriotto | Italy | 146 |
| 135 | Vladimir Miholjević | Croatia | Abandoned race after Stage 13 |
| 136 | Andrea Noè | Italy | 38 |
| 137 | Franco Pellizotti | Italy | 8 |
| 138 | Alessandro Spezialetti | Italy | 93 |
| 139 | Charlie Wegelius | Great Britain | 58 |

=== Phonak Hearing Systems (PHO) ===
| No | Name | Nationality | Final GC place |
|---|---|---|---|
| 141 | Martin Elmiger | Switzerland | 80 |
| 142 | Fabrizio Guidi | Italy | Abandoned race during Stage 18 |
| 143 | José Enrique Gutiérrez | Spain | 2 |
| 144 | Jonathan McCarty | United States | 113 |
| 145 | Axel Merckx | Belgium | Abandoned race after Stage 14 (Stomach illness) |
| 146 | Víctor Hugo Peña | Colombia | 9 |
| 147 | Grégory Rast | Switzerland | 94 |
| 148 | Johann Tschopp | Switzerland | 45 |
| 149 | Steve Zampieri | Switzerland | 48 |

=== Quick-Step–Innergetic (QSI) ===
| No | Name | Nationality | Final GC place |
|---|---|---|---|
| 151 | Serge Baguet | Belgium | Abandoned race during Stage 17 |
| 152 | Paolo Bettini | Italy | 56 : Maglia ciclamino |
| 153 | Davide Bramati | Italy | 141 |
| 154 | Addy Engels | Netherlands | 84 |
| 155 | Juan Manuel Gárate | Spain | 7 : Maglia verde |
| 156 | José Antonio Garrido | Spain | 134 |
| 157 | Leonardo Scarselli | Italy | 120 |
| 158 | Jürgen van de Walle | Belgium | 75 |
| 159 | Remmert Wielinga | Netherlands | Abandoned race after Stage 4 (Illness) |

=== Rabobank (RAB) ===
| No | Name | Nationality | Final GC place |
|---|---|---|---|
| 161 | Mauricio Ardila | Colombia | 98 |
| 162 | Theo Eltink | Netherlands | 53 |
| 163 | Graeme Brown | Australia | Abandoned race during Stage 7 |
| 164 | Mathew Hayman | Australia | 136 |
| 165 | Alexandr Kolobnev | Russia | 71 |
| 166 | Grischa Niermann | Germany | 55 |
| 167 | Marc de Maar | Netherlands | 125 |
| 168 | Michael Rasmussen | Denmark | Abandoned race after Stage 11 (Minor back injury) |
| 169 | Marc Wauters | Belgium | Abandoned race during Stage 17 |

=== Saunier Duval–Prodir (SDV) ===
| No | Name | Nationality | Final GC place |
|---|---|---|---|
| 171 | Gilberto Simoni | Italy | 3 |
| 172 | Ángel Gómez | Spain | 108 |
| 173 | Rubén Lobato | Spain | 87 |
| 174 | Peter Mazur | Poland | Abandoned race during Stage 18 |
| 175 | Manuele Mori | Italy | 88 |
| 176 | Aaron Olsen | United States | 148 |
| 177 | Leonardo Piepoli | Italy | 11 |
| 178 | Marco Pinotti | Italy | 60 |
| 179 | Guido Trentin | Italy | 30 |

=== Selle Italia–Serramenti Diquigiovanni (CLM) ===
| No | Name | Nationality | Final GC place |
|---|---|---|---|
| 181 | José Rujano | Venezuela | Abandoned race during Stage 13 (Cold) |
| 182 | José Serpa | Colombia | 31 |
| 183 | Wladimir Belli | Italy | Abandoned race during Stage 20 |
| 184 | Sergio Barbero | Italy | Abandoned race during Stage 18 |
| 185 | Alessandro Bertolini | Italy | Abandoned race during Stage 7 |
| 186 | Gabriele Missaglia | Italy | 106 |
| 187 | Raffaele Illiano | Italy | 61 |
| 188 | Alberto Loddo | Italy | Abandoned race during Stage 16 |
| 189 | Santo Anzà | Italy | 109 |

=== Team CSC (CSC) ===
| No | Name | Nationality | Final GC place |
|---|---|---|---|
| 191 | Ivan Basso | Italy | 1 : Maglia Rosa |
| 192 | Carlos Sastre | Spain | 43 |
| 193 | Nicki Sørensen | Denmark | 77 |
| 194 | Michael Blaudzun | Denmark | 96 |
| 195 | Bobby Julich | United States | 92 |
| 196 | Jens Voigt | Germany | 37 |
| 197 | Giovanni Lombardi | Italy | 117 |
| 198 | Volodymyr Hustov | Ukraine | 62 |
| 199 | Íñigo Cuesta | Spain | 52 |

=== Team Milram (MRM) ===
| No | Name | Nationality | Final GC place |
|---|---|---|---|
| 201 | Alessandro Petacchi | Italy | Abandoned race after Stage 3 (Fractured left kneecap) |
| 202 | Alessandro Cortinovis | Italy | 105 |
| 203 | Sergio Ghisalberti | Italy | 21 |
| 204 | Christian Knees | Germany | 73 |
| 205 | Mirco Lorenzetto | Italy | Abandoned race during Stage 21 (Crash injuries) |
| 206 | Alberto Ongarato | Italy | 130 |
| 207 | Elia Rigotto | Italy | 137 |
| 208 | Fabio Sacchi | Italy | 63 |
| 209 | Alessandro Vanotti | Italy | 69 |

=== T-Mobile Team (TMO) ===
| No | Name | Nationality | Final GC place |
|---|---|---|---|
| 211 | Scott Davis | Australia | 65 |
| 212 | Serhiy Honchar | Ukraine | Abandoned race after Stage 16 |
| 213 | Matthias Kessler | Germany | 72 |
| 214 | André Korff | Germany | Abandoned race during Stage 7 (Crash) |
| 215 | Jörg Ludewig | Germany | 51 |
| 216 | Olaf Pollack | Germany | 132 |
| 217 | Michael Rogers | Australia | Abandoned race after Stage 12 (Teeth infection) |
| 218 | František Raboň | Czech Republic | 147 |
| 219 | Jan Ullrich | Germany | Abandoned race during Stage 19 (Back pain) |
