= List of teams and cyclists in the 2007 Vuelta a España =

The list of teams and cyclists in the 2007 Vuelta a España contains the professional road bicycle racers who compete at the 2007 Vuelta a España from September 1 to September 23, 2007.

AG2R Prévoyance (France) A2R
| Nr. | | Pos. |
| 1 | (Spain) José Luis Arrieta | 59 |
| 2 | (Republic of Ireland) Philip Deignan | 71 |
| 3 | (France) Renaud Dion | 78 |
| 4 | (Estonia) Rene Mandri | 24 |
| 5 | (France) Hubert Dupont | 17 |
| 6 | (France) Stéphane Goubert | 13 |
| 7 | (Ukraine) Yuriy Krivtsov | 48 |
| 8 | (Belarus) Alexandre Usov | 119 |
| 9 | (France) Ludovic Turpin | 20 |

Andalucía–Cajasur (Spain) ACA
| Nr. | | Pos. |
| 11 | (Spain) Luis Pérez | 18 |
| 12 | (Spain) José Antonio López | 14 |
| 13 | (Spain) Francisco José Martínez | 114 |
| 14 | (Spain) Juan Olmo | 91 |
| 15 | (Spain) Manuel Ortega | 102 |
| 16 | (Spain) José Luis Carrasco | 82 |
| 17 | (Spain) Jesús Rosendo | 145 |
| 18 | (Spain) José Ruiz Sánchez | 56 |
| 19 | (Spain) Manuel Vazquez | 49 |

Bouygues Télécom (France) BTL
| Nr. | | Pos. |
| 21 | (Netherlands) Stef Clement | 32 |
| 22 | (France) Giovanni Bernaudeau | DNF |
| 23 | (France) Dimitri Champion | DNF |
| 24 | (France) Mathieu Claude | DNF |
| 25 | (Switzerland) Aurélien Clerc | DNF |
| 26 | (Spain) Xavier Florencio | DNF |
| 27 | (France) Rony Martias | DNF |
| 28 | (France) Vincent Jérôme | 113 |
| 29 | (Estonia) Erki Pütsep | 137 |

Caisse d'Epargne (Spain) GCE
| Nr. | | Pos. |
| 31 | (Spain) Óscar Pereiro | DNF |
| 32 | (Spain) Imanol Erviti | 62 |
| 33 | (Spain) José Vicente García | 124 |
| 34 | (Spain) Joan Horrach | 29 |
| 35 | (Russia) Vladimir Karpets | 7 |
| 36 | (Spain) David López | 14 |
| 37 | (Russia) Vladimir Efimkin | 6 |
| 38 | (Spain) Luis León Sánchez | 72 |
| 39 | (Spain) Xabier Zandio | DNF |

Cofidis (France) COF
| Nr. | | Pos. |
| 41 | (France) Stéphane Augé | 126 |
| 42 | (France) Sylvain Chavanel | 16 |
| 43 | (Colombia) Leonardo Duque | 53 |
| 44 | (Spain) Bingen Fernández | 68 |
| 45 | (France) Maryan Hary | 139 |
| 46 | (France) Geoffroy Lequatre | 98 |
| 47 | (France) Sébastien Minard | 57 |
| 48 | (Belgium) Maxime Monfort | 11 |
| 49 | (France) Damien Monier | 129 |

Crédit Agricole (France) C.A
| Nr. | | Pos. |
| 51 | (Italy) Pietro Caucchioli | DNF |
| 52 | (Russia) Alexander Bocharov | 27 |
| 53 | (Hungary) László Bodrogi | DNF |
| 54 | (Italy) Angelo Furlan | DNF |
| 55 | (France) Christophe Kern | 84 |
| 56 | (France) Rémi Pauriol | DNF |
| 57 | (France) Jean-Marc Marino | 93 |
| 58 | (Australia) Mark Renshaw | 144 |
| 59 | (France) Yannick Talabardon | 60 |

Discovery Channel (United States) DSC
| Nr. | | Pos. |
| 61 | (Slovenia) Janez Brajkovič | DNF |
| 62 | (United States) Tom Danielson | DNF |
| 63 | (Australia) Allan Davis | DNF |
| 64 | (Belgium) Stijn Devolder | DNF |
| 65 | (Spain) Egoi Martínez | DNF |
| 66 | (United States) Jason McCartney | 76 |
| 67 | (Portugal) Sérgio Paulinho | DNF |
| 68 | (Spain) José Luis Rubiera | 86 |
| 69 | (Belgium) Jurgen Van Goolen | 31 |

Euskaltel–Euskadi (Spain) EUS
| Nr. | | Pos. |
| 71 | (Spain) Samuel Sánchez | 3 |
| 72 | (Spain) Haimar Zubeldia | 44 |
| 73 | (Spain) Igor Antón | 8 |
| 74 | (Spain) Koldo Fernández | 133 |
| 75 | (Spain) Dionisio Galparsoro | 63 |
| 76 | (Spain) Aitor Hernández | 81 |
| 77 | (Spain) Iñaki Isasi | 74 |
| 78 | (Spain) Iñigo Landaluze | 75 |
| 79 | (Spain) Alan Pérez | 94 |

Française des Jeux (France) FDJ
| Nr. | | Pos. |
| 81 | (France) Carlos Da Cruz | 90 |
| 82 | (France) Mickaël Delage | DNF |
| 83 | (Sweden) Thomas Löfkvist | 54 |
| 84 | (Belgium) Philippe Gilbert | 69 |
| 85 | (Australia) Bradley McGee | DNF |
| 86 | (South Africa) Ian McLeod | DNF |
| 87 | (France) Cyrille Monnerais | DNF |
| 88 | (France) Jérémy Roy | 104 |
| 89 | (Finland) Jussi Veikkanen | 135 |

Gerolsteiner (Germany) GST
| Nr. | | Pos. |
| 91 | (Germany) Markus Fothen | 106 |
| 92 | (Germany) Johannes Fröhlinger | 45 |
| 93 | (Germany) Torsten Hiekmann | 80 |
| 94 | (Germany) Tim Klinger | 100 |
| 95 | (Italy) Andrea Moletta | 107 |
| 96 | (Italy) Davide Rebellin | DNF |
| 97 | (Germany) Stefan Schumacher | DNF |
| 98 | (Netherlands) Tom Stamsnijder | 120 |
| 99 | (Switzerland) Oliver Zaugg | 15 |

Karpin–Galicia (Spain) KGZ
| Nr. | | Pos. |
| 101 | (Spain) Carlos Castaño | DNF |
| 102 | (Spain) Gustavo César | 121 |
| 103 | (Spain) Gustavo Domínguez | 97 |
| 104 | (Spain) David García | 23 |
| 105 | (Spain) Santos González | 105 |
| 106 | (Spain) David Herrero | 33 |
| 107 | (Spain) Ezequiel Mosquera | 5 |
| 108 | (Spain) Serafín Martínez | DNF |
| 109 | (Russia) Eduard Vorganov | 70 |

Lampre–Fondital (Italy) LAM
| Nr. | | Pos. |
| 111 | (Italy) Damiano Cunego | DNF |
| 112 | (Italy) Daniele Bennati | 64 |
| 113 | (Italy) Enrico Franzoi | 110 |
| 114 | (Switzerland) David Loosli | 85 |
| 115 | (Italy) Marco Marzano | 87 |
| 116 | (Italy) Morris Possoni | 88 |
| 117 | (Poland) Sylwester Szmyd | 25 |
| 118 | (Italy) Paolo Tiralongo | DNF |
| 119 | (Italy) Claudio Corioni | 118 |

Liquigas (Italy) LIQ
| Nr. | | Pos. |
| 121 | (Spain) Manuel Beltrán | 9 |
| 122 | (Sweden) Magnus Bäckstedt | 128 |
| 123 | (Italy) Leonardo Bertagnolli | 22 |
| 124 | (Switzerland) Patrick Calcagni | 92 |
| 125 | (Italy) Francesco Chicchi | DNF |
| 126 | (Italy) Mauro Da Dalto | 101 |
| 127 | (Czech Republic) Roman Kreuziger | 21 |
| 128 | (Italy) Franco Pellizotti | 37 |
| 129 | (Italy) Alessandro Vanotti | 66 |

Predictor–Lotto (Belgium) PRL
| Nr. | | Pos. |
| 131 | (Australia) Cadel Evans | 4 |
| 132 | (Belgium) Mario Aerts | 28 |
| 133 | (Belgium) Christophe Brandt | 132 |
| 134 | (Belgium) Bart Dockx | 111 |
| 135 | (United States) Chris Horner | 36 |
| 136 | (Spain) Josep Jufré | DNF |
| 137 | (Belgium) Bert Roesems | DNF |
| 138 | (Netherlands) Roy Sentjens | 79 |
| 139 | (Belgium) Wim Van Huffel | 26 |

Quick-Step–Innergetic (Belgium) QSI
| Nr. | | Pos. |
| 141 | (Spain) Juan Manuel Gárate | 30 |
| 142 | (Spain) Carlos Barredo | 10 |
| 143 | (Italy) Paolo Bettini | DNF |
| 144 | (Belgium) Tom Boonen | DNF |
| 145 | (Belgium) Kevin Hulsmans | 116 |
| 146 | (Italy) Andrea Tonti | DNF |
| 147 | (Belgium) Geert Verheyen | 46 |
| 148 | (Italy) Davide Viganò | 130 |
| 149 | (Netherlands) Addy Engels | 83 |

Rabobank (Netherlands) RAB
| Nr. | | Pos. |
| 151 | (Russia) Denis Menchov | 1 |
| 152 | (Colombia) Mauricio Ardila | 67 |
| 153 | (Netherlands) Marc De Maar | 109 |
| 154 | (Netherlands) Theo Eltink | 95 |
| 155 | (Spain) Óscar Freire | DNF |
| 156 | (Spain) Pedro Horrillo | 140 |
| 157 | (Netherlands) Sebastian Langeveld | 112 |
| 158 | (Netherlands) Koos Moerenhout | 42 |
| 159 | (Netherlands) Joost Posthuma | 55 |

Relax–GAM (Spain) REG
| Nr. | | Pos. |
| 161 | (Spain) Daniel Moreno | 12 |
| 162 | (Spain) Santiago Pérez | 65 |
| 163 | (Spain) Raúl García de Mateos | 99 |
| 164 | (Spain) Jorge García | 108 |
| 165 | (Spain) Jesús Hernández | DNF |
| 166 | (Spain) Nácor Burgos | 122 |
| 167 | (Spain) Julián Sánchez | 123 |
| 168 | (Spain) Francisco Terciado Sacedo | 103 |
| 169 | (Spain) Ángel Vallejo | 47 |

Saunier Duval–Prodir (Spain) SDV
| Nr. | | Pos. |
| 171 | (Spain) José Ángel Gómez Marchante | 40 |
| 172 | (Spain) Iker Camaño | 34 |
| 173 | (Spain) Alberto Fernández de la Puebla | DNF |
| 174 | (Spain) David de la Fuente | 96 |
| 175 | (Spain) Arkaitz Durán | DNF |
| 176 | (Spain) Rubén Lobato | 38 |
| 177 | (Spain) Javier Mejías | 50 |
| 178 | (Italy) Leonardo Piepoli | DNF |
| 179 | (Spain) Ángel Gómez | 61 |

Team CSC (Denmark) CSC
| Nr. | | Pos. |
| 181 | (Spain) Carlos Sastre | 2 |
| 182 | (Denmark) Michael Blaudzun | DNF |
| 183 | (Spain) Íñigo Cuesta | 41 |
| 184 | (Ukraine) Volodymir Gustov | 35 |
| 185 | (Russia) Alexandr Kolobnev | 51 |
| 186 | (Netherlands) Karsten Kroon | 52 |
| 187 | (Sweden) Marcus Ljungqvist | 43 |
| 188 | (Denmark) Chris Anker Sørensen | 19 |
| 189 | (United States) Christian Vande Velde | 39 |

Team Milram (Italy) MRM
| Nr. | | Pos. |
| 191 | (Italy) Alessandro Petacchi | 127 |
| 192 | (Germany) Erik Zabel | 73 |
| 193 | (Germany) Martin Müller | 115 |
| 194 | (Slovakia) Matej Jurčo | 134 |
| 195 | (Italy) Elia Rigotto | 138 |
| 196 | (Italy) Fabio Sabatini | 131 |
| 197 | (Netherlands) Niki Terpstra | 142 |
| 198 | (Italy) Marco Velo | 117 |
| 199 | (Italy) Alberto Ongarato | 136 |

T-Mobile Team (Germany) TMO
| Nr. | | Pos. |
| 201 | (Australia) Adam Hansen | 89 |
| 202 | (Italy) Lorenzo Bernucci | DNF |
| 203 | (Australia) Scott Davis | 77 |
| 204 | (Germany) Bert Grabsch | DNF |
| 205 | (Germany) André Greipel | 125 |
| 206 | (Italy) Giuseppe Guerini | DNF |
| 207 | (Germany) Andreas Klier | DNF |
| 208 | (Germany) André Korff | 141 |
| 209 | (Germany) Stephan Schreck | 58 |
