= List of HTC–Highroad riders =

The List of HTC–Highroad riders contains riders from the team which have had the names Team Deutsche Telekom, T-Mobile Team, Team High Road, Team Columbia, Team Columbia–HTC, Team HTC–Columbia, and presently, HTC–Highroad.

== 2011 (HTC–Highroad) ==
Ages as of 1 January 2011.

Rider	Date of birth
Michael Albasini (SUI)	December 20, 1980 (aged 30)
Lars Bak (DEN)	January 16, 1980 (aged 30)
Matt Brammeier (IRE)	June 7, 1985 (aged 25)
Mark Cavendish (GBR)	May 21, 1985 (aged 25)
John Degenkolb (GER)	January 7, 1989 (aged 21)
Bernhard Eisel (AUT)	February 17, 1981 (aged 29)
Caleb Fairly (USA)	February 19, 1987 (aged 23)
Jan Ghyselinck (BEL)	February 24, 1988 (aged 22)
Matthew Goss (AUS)	November 5, 1986 (aged 24)
Bert Grabsch (GER)	June 19, 1975 (aged 35)
Patrick Gretsch (GER)	April 17, 1987 (aged 23)
Leigh Howard (AUS)	October 18, 1989 (aged 21)
Craig Lewis (USA)	January 10, 1985 (aged 25)

Rider	Date of birth
Tony Martin (GER)	April 23, 1985 (aged 25)
Danny Pate (USA)	March 23, 1979 (aged 31)
Marco Pinotti (ITA)	February 25, 1976 (aged 34)
František Raboň (CZE)	September 26, 1983 (aged 27)
Alex Rasmussen (DEN)	June 9, 1984 (aged 26)
Mark Renshaw (AUS)	October 22, 1982 (aged 28)
Hayden Roulston (NZL)	January 10, 1981 (aged 29)
Kanstantsin Sivtsov (BLR)	August 9, 1982 (aged 28)
Gatis Smukulis (LAT)	April 15, 1987 (aged 23)
Tejay van Garderen (USA)	August 12, 1988 (aged 22)
Martin Velits (SVK)	February 21, 1985 (aged 25)
Peter Velits (SVK)	February 21, 1985 (aged 25)

== 2010 (Team HTC–Columbia) ==
Ages as of 1 January 2010.

Rider	Date of birth
Michael Albasini (SUI)	December 20, 1980 (aged 29)
Lars Bak (DEN)	January 16, 1980 (aged 29)
Mark Cavendish (GBR)	May 21, 1985 (aged 24)
Gert Dockx (BEL)	July 4, 1988 (aged 21)
Bernhard Eisel (AUT)	February 17, 1981 (aged 28)
Jan Ghyselinck (BEL)	February 24, 1988 (aged 21)
Matthew Goss (AUS)	November 5, 1986 (aged 23)
Bert Grabsch (GER)	June 19, 1975 (aged 34)
André Greipel (GER)	July 16, 1982 (aged 27)
Patrick Gretsch (GER)	April 17, 1987 (aged 22)
Rasmus Guldhammer (DEN)	March 9, 1989 (aged 20)
Adam Hansen (AUS)	May 11, 1981 (aged 28)
Leigh Howard (AUS)	October 18, 1989 (aged 20)
Craig Lewis (USA)	January 10, 1985 (aged 24)

Rider	Date of birth
Tony Martin (GER)	April 23, 1985 (aged 24)
Maxime Monfort (BEL)	January 14, 1983 (aged 26)
Marco Pinotti (ITA)	February 25, 1976 (aged 33)
František Raboň (CZE)	September 26, 1983 (aged 26)
Mark Renshaw (AUS)	October 22, 1982 (aged 27)
Vicente Reynés (ESP)	July 30, 1981 (aged 28)
Michael Rogers (AUS)	December 20, 1979 (aged 30)
Hayden Roulston (NZL)	January 10, 1981 (aged 28)
Aleksejs Saramotins (LAT)	April 8, 1982 (aged 27)
Marcel Sieberg (GER)	April 30, 1982 (aged 27)
Kanstantsin Sivtsov (BLR)	August 9, 1982 (aged 27)
Tejay van Garderen (USA)	August 12, 1988 (aged 21)
Martin Velits (SVK)	February 21, 1985 (aged 24)
Peter Velits (SVK)	February 21, 1985 (aged 24)

== 2009 (Team Columbia–High Road/Team Columbia–HTC) ==
Ages as of 1 January 2009.

Rider	Date of birth
Michael Albasini (SUI)	December 20, 1980 (aged 28)
Michael Barry (CAN)	December 18, 1975 (aged 33)
Edvald Boasson Hagen (NOR)	May 17, 1987 (aged 21)
Marcus Burghardt (GER)	June 30, 1983 (aged 25)
Mark Cavendish (GBR)	May 21, 1985 (aged 23)
Gert Dockx (BEL)	July 4, 1988 (aged 20)
Bernhard Eisel (AUT)	February 17, 1981 (aged 27)
Bert Grabsch (GER)	June 19, 1975 (aged 33)
André Greipel (GER)	July 16, 1982 (aged 26)
Adam Hansen (AUS)	May 11, 1981 (aged 27)
Greg Henderson (NZL)	September 10, 1976 (aged 32)
George Hincapie (USA)	June 29, 1973 (aged 35)
Kim Kirchen (LUX)	July 3, 1978 (aged 30)

Rider	Date of birth
Craig Lewis (USA)	January 10, 1985 (aged 23)
Thomas Löfkvist (SWE)	April 4, 1984 (aged 24)
Tony Martin (GER)	April 23, 1985 (aged 23)
Maxime Monfort (BEL)	January 14, 1983 (aged 25)
Marco Pinotti (ITA)	February 25, 1976 (aged 32)
Morris Possoni (ITA)	July 1, 1984 (aged 24)
František Raboň (CZE)	September 26, 1983 (aged 25)
Mark Renshaw (AUS)	October 22, 1982 (aged 26)
Vicente Reynés (ESP)	July 30, 1981 (aged 27)
Michael Rogers (AUS)	December 20, 1979 (aged 29)
Marcel Sieberg (GER)	April 30, 1982 (aged 26)
Kanstantsin Sivtsov (BLR)	August 9, 1982 (aged 26)

== 2008 (Team High Road/Team Columbia) ==
Ages as of 1 January 2008.

Rider	Date of birth
Michael Barry (CAN)	December 18, 1975 (aged 32)
Edvald Boasson Hagen (NOR)	May 17, 1987 (aged 20)
Marcus Burghardt (GER)	June 30, 1983 (aged 24)
Mark Cavendish (GBR)	May 21, 1985 (aged 22)
Gerald Ciolek (GER)	September 19, 1986 (aged 21)
Scott Davis (AUS)	April 22, 1979 (aged 28)
John Devine (USA)	November 2, 1985 (aged 22)
Bernhard Eisel (AUT)	February 17, 1981 (aged 26)
Linus Gerdemann (GER)	September 16, 1982 (aged 25)
Bert Grabsch (GER)	June 19, 1975 (aged 32)
André Greipel (GER)	July 16, 1982 (aged 25)
Roger Hammond (GBR)	January 30, 1974 (aged 33)
Adam Hansen (AUS)	May 11, 1981 (aged 26)
Greg Henderson (NZL)	September 10, 1976 (aged 31)
George Hincapie (USA)	June 29, 1973 (aged 34)

Rider	Date of birth
Kim Kirchen (LUX)	July 3, 1978 (aged 29)
Andreas Klier (GER)	January 15, 1976 (aged 31)
Servais Knaven (NED)	March 6, 1971 (aged 36)
Craig Lewis (USA)	January 10, 1985 (aged 22)
Thomas Löfkvist (SWE)	April 4, 1984 (aged 23)
Tony Martin (GER)	April 23, 1985 (aged 22)
Marco Pinotti (ITA)	February 25, 1976 (aged 31)
Morris Possoni (ITA)	July 1, 1984 (aged 23)
František Raboň (CZE)	September 26, 1983 (aged 24)
Vicente Reynés (ESP)	July 30, 1981 (aged 26)
Michael Rogers (AUS)	December 20, 1979 (aged 28)
Marcel Sieberg (GER)	April 30, 1982 (aged 25)
Kanstantsin Sivtsov (BLR)	August 9, 1982 (aged 25)
Bradley Wiggins (GBR)	April 28, 1980 (aged 27)

== 2007 (T-Mobile Team) ==
Ages as of 1 January 2007.

Rider	Date of birth
Michael Barry (CAN)	December 18, 1975 (aged 31)
Eric Baumann (GER)	March 21, 1980 (aged 26)
~~Lorenzo Bernucci~~* (ITA)	September 15, 1979 (aged 27)
Marcus Burghardt (GER)	June 30, 1983 (aged 23)
Mark Cavendish (GBR)	May 21, 1985 (aged 21)
Gerald Ciolek (GER)	September 19, 1986 (aged 20)
Scott Davis (AUS)	April 22, 1979 (aged 27)
Bernhard Eisel (AUT)	February 17, 1981 (aged 25)
Linus Gerdemann (GER)	September 16, 1982 (aged 24)
Bert Grabsch (GER)	June 19, 1975 (aged 31)
André Greipel (GER)	July 16, 1982 (aged 24)
Giuseppe Guerini (ITA)	February 14, 1970 (aged 36)
Roger Hammond (GBR)	January 30, 1974 (aged 32)
Adam Hansen (AUS)	May 11, 1981 (aged 25)
Greg Henderson (NZL)	September 10, 1976 (aged 30)

Rider	Date of birth
~~Serhiy Honchar~~* (UKR)	July 3, 1970 (aged 36)
Kim Kirchen (LUX)	July 3, 1978 (aged 28)
Andreas Klier (GER)	January 15, 1976 (aged 30)
Servais Knaven (NED)	March 6, 1971 (aged 35)
André Korff (GER)	June 16, 1973 (aged 33)
Axel Merckx (BEL)	August 8, 1972 (aged 34)
Aaron Olsen (USA)	January 11, 1978 (aged 28)
Jakob Piil (DEN)	September 3, 1973 (aged 33)
Marco Pinotti (ITA)	February 25, 1976 (aged 30)
František Raboň (CZE)	September 26, 1983 (aged 23)
Michael Rogers (AUS)	December 20, 1979 (aged 27)
Stephan Schreck (GER)	July 15, 1978 (aged 28)
~~Patrik Sinkewitz~~* (GER)	October 20, 1980 (aged 26)
Thomas Ziegler (GER)	November 24, 1980 (aged 26)

* Fired because of positive doping tests

== 2006 (T-Mobile Team) ==
Ages as of 1 January 2006.

Rider	Date of birth
Eric Baumann (GER)	March 21, 1980 (aged 25)
Lorenzo Bernucci (ITA)	September 15, 1979 (aged 26)
Marcus Burghardt (GER)	June 30, 1983 (aged 22)
Scott Davis (AUS)	April 22, 1979 (aged 26)
Linus Gerdemann (GER)	September 16, 1982 (aged 23)
Bas Giling (NED)	November 4, 1982 (aged 23)
André Greipel (GER)	July 16, 1982 (aged 23)
Giuseppe Guerini (ITA)	February 14, 1970 (aged 35)
Serhiy Honchar (UKR)	July 3, 1970 (aged 35)
Sergei Ivanov (RUS)	March 5, 1975 (aged 30)
Matthias Kessler (GER)	May 16, 1979 (aged 26)
Kim Kirchen (LUX)	July 3, 1978 (aged 27)
Andreas Klier (GER)	January 15, 1976 (aged 29)
Andreas Klöden (GER)	June 22, 1975 (aged 30)

Rider	Date of birth
Bernhard Kohl (AUT)	January 4, 1982 (aged 23)
André Korff (GER)	June 16, 1973 (aged 32)
Jörg Ludewig (GER)	September 9, 1975 (aged 30)
Eddy Mazzoleni (ITA)	July 29, 1973 (aged 32)
Daniele Nardello (ITA)	August 2, 1972 (aged 33)
Olaf Pollack (GER)	September 20, 1973 (aged 32)
František Raboň (CZE)	September 26, 1983 (aged 22)
Michael Rogers (AUS)	December 20, 1979 (aged 26)
Bram Schmitz (NED)	April 23, 1977 (aged 28)
Stephan Schreck (GER)	July 15, 1978 (aged 27)
Óscar Sevilla (ESP)	September 29, 1976 (aged 29)
Patrik Sinkewitz (GER)	October 20, 1980 (aged 25)
Jan Ullrich (GER)	December 2, 1973 (aged 32)
Steffen Wesemann (SUI)	March 11, 1971 (aged 34)
Thomas Ziegler (GER)	November 24, 1980 (aged 25)

== 2005 (T-Mobile Team) ==
Ages as of 1 January 2005.

Rider	Date of birth
Rolf Aldag (GER)	August 25, 1968 (aged 36)
Eric Baumann (GER)	March 21, 1980 (aged 24)
Marcus Burghardt (GER)	June 30, 1983 (aged 21)
Bas Giling (NED)	November 4, 1982 (aged 22)
Giuseppe Guerini (ITA)	February 14, 1970 (aged 34)
Torsten Hiekmann (GER)	March 17, 1980 (aged 24)
Sergei Ivanov (RUS)	March 5, 1975 (aged 29)
Francisco José Lara (ESP)	February 25, 1977 (aged 27)
Matthias Kessler (GER)	May 16, 1979 (aged 25)
Andreas Klier (GER)	January 15, 1976 (aged 28)
Andreas Klöden (GER)	June 22, 1975 (aged 29)
Bernhard Kohl (AUT)	January 4, 1982 (aged 22)
Tomáš Konečný (CZE)	October 11, 1973 (aged 31)
André Korff (GER)	June 16, 1973 (aged 31)

Rider	Date of birth
Daniele Nardello (ITA)	August 2, 1972 (aged 32)
Olaf Pollack (GER)	September 20, 1973 (aged 31)
Jan Schaffrath (GER)	March 16, 1971 (aged 33)
Bram Schmitz (NED)	April 23, 1977 (aged 27)
Stephan Schreck (GER)	July 15, 1978 (aged 26)
Óscar Sevilla (ESP)	September 29, 1976 (aged 28)
Tobias Steinhauser (GER)	January 27, 1972 (aged 32)
Jan Ullrich (GER)	December 2, 1973 (aged 31)
Alexander Vinokourov (KAZ)	September 16, 1973 (aged 31)
Christian Werner (GER)	June 28, 1979 (aged 25)
Steffen Wesemann (SUI)	March 11, 1971 (aged 33)
Serguei Yakovlev (KAZ)	April 21, 1976 (aged 28)
Erik Zabel (GER)	July 7, 1970 (aged 34)

== 2004 (T-Mobile Team) ==
Ages as of 1 January 2004.

Rider	Date of birth
Mario Aerts (BEL)	December 31, 1974 (aged 29)
Rolf Aldag (GER)	August 25, 1968 (aged 35)
Eric Baumann (GER)	March 21, 1980 (aged 23)
Marcus Burghardt (GER)	June 30, 1983 (aged 20)
Santiago Botero (COL)	October 27, 1972 (aged 31)
Cadel Evans (AUS)	February 14, 1977 (aged 26)
Giuseppe Guerini (ITA)	February 14, 1970 (aged 33)
Torsten Hiekmann (GER)	March 17, 1980 (aged 23)
Sergei Ivanov (RUS)	March 5, 1975 (aged 28)
Matthias Kessler (GER)	May 16, 1979 (aged 24)
Andreas Klier (GER)	January 15, 1976 (aged 27)
Andreas Klöden (GER)	June 22, 1975 (aged 28)
Tomáš Konečný (CZE)	October 11, 1973 (aged 30)

Rider	Date of birth
André Korff (GER)	June 16, 1973 (aged 30)
Daniele Nardello (ITA)	August 2, 1972 (aged 31)
Paolo Savoldelli (ITA)	May 7, 1973 (aged 30)
Jan Schaffrath (GER)	March 16, 1971 (aged 32)
Bram Schmitz (NED)	April 23, 1977 (aged 26)
Stephan Schreck (GER)	July 15, 1978 (aged 25)
Tobias Steinhauser (GER)	January 27, 1972 (aged 31)
Jan Ullrich (GER)	December 2, 1973 (aged 30)
Alexander Vinokourov (KAZ)	September 16, 1973 (aged 30)
Christian Werner (GER)	June 28, 1979 (aged 24)
Steffen Wesemann (SUI)	March 11, 1971 (aged 32)
Serguei Yakovlev (KAZ)	April 21, 1976 (aged 27)
Erik Zabel (GER)	July 7, 1970 (aged 33)

== 2003 (Telekom) ==
Ages as of 1 January 2003.

Rider	Date of birth
Mario Aerts (BEL)	December 31, 1974 (aged 28)
Rolf Aldag (GER)	August 25, 1968 (aged 34)
Santiago Botero (COL)	October 27, 1972 (aged 30)
Cadel Evans (AUS)	February 14, 1977 (aged 25)
Gian Matteo Fagnini (ITA)	October 11, 1970 (aged 32)
Ralf Grabsch (GER)	April 7, 1973 (aged 29)
Giuseppe Guerini (ITA)	February 14, 1970 (aged 32)
Torsten Hiekmann (GER)	March 17, 1980 (aged 22)
Danilo Hondo (GER)	January 4, 1974 (aged 28)
Kai Hundertmarck (GER)	April 25, 1969 (aged 33)
Bobby Julich (USA)	November 18, 1971 (aged 31)
Matthias Kessler (GER)	May 16, 1979 (aged 23)
Andreas Klier (GER)	January 15, 1976 (aged 26)

Rider	Date of birth
Andreas Klöden (GER)	June 22, 1975 (aged 27)
David Kopp (GER)	January 5, 1979 (aged 23)
Daniele Nardello (ITA)	August 2, 1972 (aged 30)
Dirk Reichl (GER)	September 12, 1981 (aged 21)
Paolo Savoldelli (ITA)	May 7, 1973 (aged 29)
Jan Schaffrath (GER)	March 16, 1971 (aged 31)
Stephan Schreck (GER)	July 15, 1978 (aged 24)
Stefan Schumacher (GER)	July 21, 1981 (aged 21)
Alexander Vinokourov (KAZ)	September 16, 1973 (aged 29)
Steffen Wesemann (SUI)	March 11, 1971 (aged 31)
Serguei Yakovlev (KAZ)	April 21, 1976 (aged 26)
Erik Zabel (GER)	July 7, 1970 (aged 32)

== 2002 (Telekom) ==
Ages as of 1 January 2002.

Rider	Date of birth
Rolf Aldag (GER)	August 25, 1968 (aged 33)
Robert Bartko (GER)	December 23, 1975 (aged 26)
Udo Bölts (GER)	August 10, 1966 (aged 35)
Gian Matteo Fagnini (ITA)	October 11, 1970 (aged 31)
Ralf Grabsch (GER)	April 7, 1973 (aged 28)
Giuseppe Guerini (ITA)	February 14, 1970 (aged 31)
Jens Heppner (GER)	December 23, 1964 (aged 37)
Torsten Hiekmann (GER)	March 17, 1980 (aged 21)
Danilo Hondo (GER)	January 4, 1974 (aged 27)
Kai Hundertmarck (GER)	April 25, 1969 (aged 32)
Bobby Julich (USA)	November 18, 1971 (aged 30)
Matthias Kessler (GER)	May 16, 1979 (aged 22)
Andreas Klier (GER)	January 15, 1976 (aged 25)

Rider	Date of birth
Andreas Klöden (GER)	June 22, 1975 (aged 26)
David Kopp (GER)	January 5, 1979 (aged 22)
Kevin Livingston (USA)	May 24, 1973 (aged 28)
Dirk Reichl (GER)	September 12, 1981 (aged 20)
Jan Schaffrath (GER)	March 16, 1971 (aged 30)
Stephan Schreck (GER)	July 15, 1978 (aged 23)
Stefan Schumacher (GER)	July 21, 1981 (aged 20)
Jan Ullrich (GER)	December 2, 1973 (aged 28)
Alexander Vinokourov (KAZ)	September 16, 1973 (aged 28)
Steffen Wesemann (SUI)	March 11, 1971 (aged 30)
Serguei Yakovlev (KAZ)	April 21, 1976 (aged 25)
Erik Zabel (GER)	July 7, 1970 (aged 31)

== 2001 (Telekom) ==
Ages as of 1 January 2001.

Rider	Date of birth
Rolf Aldag (GER)	August 25, 1968 (aged 32)
Robert Bartko (GER)	December 23, 1975 (aged 25)
Udo Bölts (GER)	August 10, 1966 (aged 34)
Alberto Elli (ITA)	March 9, 1964 (aged 36)
Gian Matteo Fagnini (ITA)	October 11, 1970 (aged 30)
Ralf Grabsch (GER)	April 7, 1973 (aged 27)
Giuseppe Guerini (ITA)	February 14, 1970 (aged 30)
Jens Heppner (GER)	December 23, 1964 (aged 36)
Torsten Hiekmann (GER)	March 17, 1980 (aged 20)
Danilo Hondo (GER)	January 4, 1974 (aged 26)
Kai Hundertmarck (GER)	April 25, 1969 (aged 31)
Bobby Julich (USA)	November 18, 1971 (aged 29)
Matthias Kessler (GER)	May 16, 1979 (aged 21)

Rider	Date of birth
Andreas Klier (GER)	January 15, 1976 (aged 24)
Andreas Klöden (GER)	June 22, 1975 (aged 25)
Kevin Livingston (USA)	May 24, 1973 (aged 27)
Giovanni Lombardi (ITA)	July 20, 1969 (aged 31)
Andrey Mizurov (KAZ)	March 16, 1973 (aged 27)
Jan Schaffrath (GER)	March 16, 1971 (aged 30)
Stephan Schreck (GER)	July 15, 1978 (aged 22)
Roberto Sgambelluri (ITA)	April 6, 1974 (aged 26)
Gerhard Trampusch (AUT)	August 11, 1978 (aged 22)
Jan Ullrich (GER)	December 2, 1973 (aged 27)
Alexander Vinokourov (KAZ)	September 16, 1973 (aged 27)
Steffen Wesemann (SUI)	March 11, 1971 (aged 29)
Erik Zabel (GER)	July 7, 1970 (aged 30)

== 2000 (Telekom) ==
- (Germany) Rolf Aldag
- (Germany) Udo Bölts
- (Italy) Alberto Elli
- (Italy) Gian Matteo Fagnini
- (Germany) Ralf Grabsch
- (Italy) Giuseppe Guerini
- (Germany) Jens Heppner
- (Germany) Danilo Hondo
- (Germany) Kai Hundertmarck
- (Germany) Jörg Jaksche
- (Germany) Matthias Kessler
- (Germany) Andreas Klöden
- (Italy) Giovanni Lombardi
- (Kazakhstan) Andrei Mizourov
- (Germany) Jan Schaffrath
- (Germany) Stephan Schreck
- (Austria) Georg Totschnig
- (Austria) Gerhard Trampusch
- (Germany) Jan Ullrich
- (Kazakhstan) Alexander Vinokourov
- (Switzerland) Steffen Wesemann
- (Germany) Erik Zabel

== 1999 (Telekom) ==
- (Germany) Rolf Aldag
- (Germany) Dirk Baldinger
- (Germany) Udo Bölts
- (Italy) Alberto Elli
- (Italy) Francesco Frattini
- (Germany) Ralf Grabsch
- (Italy) Giuseppe Guerini
- (Germany) Christian Henn
- (Germany) Jens Heppner
- (Germany) Danilo Hondo
- (Germany) Kai Hundertmarck
- (Germany) Jörg Jaksche
- (Germany) Andreas Klöden
- (Italy) Giovanni Lombardi
- (Denmark) Bjarne Riis
- (Germany) Jan Schaffrath
- (Austria) Georg Totschnig
- (Germany) Jan Ullrich
- (Switzerland) Steffen Wesemann
- (Germany) Erik Zabel

== 1998 (Telekom) ==
- (Germany) Rolf Aldag
- (Germany) Dirk Baldinger
- (Denmark) Michael Blaudzun
- (Germany) Udo Bölts
- (Germany) Bert Dietz
- (Italy) Francesco Frattini
- (Germany) Christian Henn
- (Germany) Jens Heppner
- (Germany) Kai Hundertmarck
- (Italy) Giovanni Lombardi
- (Germany) Dirk Müller
- (Denmark) Bjarne Riis
- (Germany) Jan Schaffrath
- (Austria) Georg Totschnig
- (Germany) Jan Ullrich
- (Switzerland) Steffen Wesemann
- (Germany) Erik Zabel

== 1997 (Telekom) ==
- (Germany) Rolf Aldag
- (Germany) Udo Bölts
- (Belgium) Frank Corvers
- (Germany) Bert Dietz
- (Germany) Christian Henn
- (Germany) Jens Heppner
- (Denmark) Brian Holm
- (Germany) Kai Hundertmarck
- (Germany) Mario Kummer
- (Sweden) Michel Lafis
- (Italy) Giovanni Lombardi
- (Denmark) Bjarne Riis
- (Austria) Georg Totschnig
- (Germany) Jan Ullrich
- (Switzerland) Steffen Wesemann
- (Germany) Erik Zabel

== 1996 (Telekom) ==
- (Germany) Rolf Aldag
- (Sweden) Michael Andersson
- (Germany) Gerd Audehm
- (Germany) Udo Bölts
- (Germany) Bert Dietz
- (Germany) Christian Henn
- (Germany) Jens Heppner
- (Denmark) Brian Holm
- (Germany) Kai Hundertmarck
- (Germany) Mario Kummer
- (Sweden) Michel Lafis
- (Germany) Olaf Ludwig
- (Denmark) Peter Meinert Nielsen
- (Denmark) Bjarne Riis
- (Germany) Jan Ullrich
- (Germany) Jürgen Werner
- (Switzerland) Steffen Wesemann
- (Germany) Erik Zabel

== 1995 (Telekom) ==
- (Germany) Rolf Aldag
- (Germany) Gerd Audehm
- (Germany) Udo Bölts
- (Germany) Bert Dietz
- (Germany) Bernd Gröne
- (Germany) Christian Henn
- (Germany) Jens Heppner
- (Denmark) Brian Holm
- (Germany) Kai Hundertmarck
- (Germany) Mario Kummer
- (Sweden) Olaf Ludwig
- (Ukraine) Vladimir Pulnikov
- (Germany) Uwe Raab
- (Germany) Heinrich Trumheller
- (Germany) Jan Ullrich
- (Germany) Jürgen Werner
- (Switzerland) Steffen Wesemann
- (Germany) Erik Zabel

== 1994 (Telekom) ==
- (Germany) Rolf Aldag
- (Germany) Gerd Audehm
- (Germany) Udo Bölts
- (Germany) Bert Dietz
- (Germany) Bernd Gröne
- (Germany) Christian Henn
- (Germany) Jens Heppner
- (Denmark) Brian Holm
- (Germany) Mario Kummer
- (Germany) Dominik Krieger
- (Germany) Jens Lehmann
- (Sweden) Olaf Ludwig
- (Belgium) Axel Merckx
- (Netherlands) Marc van Orsouw
- (Germany) Uwe Raab
- (Germany) Jan Ullrich
- (Germany) Jürgen Werner
- (Switzerland) Steffen Wesemann
- (Germany) Erik Zabel

== 1993 (Telekom) ==
- (Germany) Rolf Aldag
- (Germany) Uwe Ampler
- (Germany) Gerd Audehm
- (Germany) Udo Bölts
- (Germany) Bernd Gröne
- (Netherlands) Jacques Hanegraaf
- (Germany) Christian Henn
- (Germany) Jens Heppner
- (Denmark) Brian Holm
- (Germany) Mario Kummer
- (Germany) Dominik Krieger
- (Sweden) Olaf Ludwig
- (Netherlands) Marc van Orsouw
- (Germany) Uwe Raab
- (Germany) Jürgen Werner
- (Switzerland) Steffen Wesemann
- (Belgium) Etienne De Wilde
- (Germany) Erik Zabel

== 1992 (Telekom) ==
- (Germany) Uwe Ampler
- (Germany) Udo Bölts
- (Belgium) Peter Farazijn
- (Germany) Peter Gänsler
- (Germany) Bernd Gröne
- (Germany) Christian Henn
- (Germany) Jens Heppner
- (Germany) Sepp Holzmann
- (Germany) Michael Hübner
- (Germany) Andreas Kappes
- (France) Marc Madiot
- (France) Yvon Madiot
- (Germany) Robert Matwew
- (Belgium) Wilfried Peeters
- (Germany) Markus Schleicher
- (Germany) Remig Stumpf
- (Belgium) Etienne De Wilde
- (Germany) Carsten Wolf

== 1991 (Telekom) ==
- (Netherlands) Marcel Arntz
- (Germany) Hartmut Bölts
- (Germany) Udo Bölts
- (Germany) Gerd Dörich
- (Germany) Guido Eickelbeck
- (Germany) Peter Gänsler
- (Germany) Bernd Gröne
- (Switzerland) Urs Freuler
- (Germany) Markus Hess
- (Germany) Sepp Holzmann
- (Germany) Michael Hübner
- (Germany) Dariusz Kajzer
- (Germany) Robert Matwew
- (Netherlands) Erwin Nijboer
- (Germany) Markus Schleicher
- (Netherlands) Gerard Veldscholten
- (Germany) Carsten Wolf
- (Australia) Dean Woods
- (Germany) Werner Wüller
- (Netherlands) Ad Wijnands

== See also ==
- HTC–Highroad
- List of HTC–Highroad wins
- 2011 HTC–Highroad season
- 2010 Team HTC–Columbia season
- List of Team Specialized–lululemon riders
