= List of teams and cyclists in the 2005 Giro d'Italia =

The 2005 Giro d'Italia was the 88th edition of the Giro d'Italia, one of cycling's Grand Tours. The field consisted of 197 riders, and 153 riders finished the race.

== By rider ==
Legend
No.	Starting number worn by the rider during the Giro
Pos.	Position in the general classification
DNF	Denotes a rider who did not finish

No.	Name	Nationality	Team	Pos.	Ref
1	Damiano Cunego	Italy	Lampre–Caffita	18	
2	Gilberto Simoni	Italy	Lampre–Caffita	2	
3	Paolo Fornaciari	Italy	Lampre–Caffita	148	
4	Evgeni Petrov	Russia	Lampre–Caffita	50	
5	Andrea Tonti	Italy	Lampre–Caffita	55	
6	Marius Sabaliauskas	Lithuania	Lampre–Caffita	66	
7	Gorazd Štangelj	Slovenia	Lampre–Caffita	67	
8	Sylwester Szmyd	Poland	Lampre–Caffita	64	
9	Patxi Vila	Spain	Lampre–Caffita	22	
11	Walter Bénéteau	France	Bouygues Télécom	105	
12	Giovanni Bernaudeau	France	Bouygues Télécom	110	
13	Olivier Bonnaire	France	Bouygues Télécom	82	
14	Mathieu Claude	France	Bouygues Télécom	147	
15	Christophe Kern	France	Bouygues Télécom	DNF	
16	Laurent Lefèvre	France	Bouygues Télécom	35	
17	Rony Martias	France	Bouygues Télécom	141	
18	Franck Rénier	France	Bouygues Télécom	134	
19	Didier Rous	France	Bouygues Télécom	DNF	
21	Emanuele Sella	Italy	Ceramica Panaria–Navigare	10	
22	Luca Mazzanti	Italy	Ceramica Panaria–Navigare	39	
23	Julio Alberto Pérez	Mexico	Ceramica Panaria–Navigare	95	
24	Paolo Tiralongo	Italy	Ceramica Panaria–Navigare	32	
25	Paride Grillo	Italy	Ceramica Panaria–Navigare	143	
26	Fredy González	Colombia	Ceramica Panaria–Navigare	DNF	
27	Brett Lancaster	Australia	Ceramica Panaria–Navigare	112	
28	Luis Laverde	Colombia	Ceramica Panaria–Navigare	44	
29	Domenico Pozzovivo	Italy	Ceramica Panaria–Navigare	DNF	
31	Daniel Atienza	Spain	Cofidis	14	
32	Leonardo Bertagnolli	Italy	Cofidis	DNF	
33	Dmitry Fofonov	Kazakhstan	Cofidis	89	
34	Nicolas Inaudi	France	Cofidis	DNF	
35	Thierry Marichal	Belgium	Cofidis	125	
36	Stuart O'Grady	Australia	Cofidis	DNF	
37	Guido Trentin	Italy	Cofidis	40	
38	Cédric Vasseur	France	Cofidis	54	
39	Matthew White	Australia	Cofidis	117	
41	Iván Parra	Colombia	Colombia–Selle Italia	20	
42	Marlon Pérez	Colombia	Colombia–Selle Italia	DNF	
43	José Rujano	Venezuela	Colombia–Selle Italia	3	
44	Raffaele Illiano	Italy	Colombia–Selle Italia	86	
45	Moreno Di Biase	Italy	Colombia–Selle Italia	DNF	
46	Leonardo Scarselli	Italy	Colombia–Selle Italia	116	
47	Philippe Schnyder	Switzerland	Colombia–Selle Italia	149	
48	Russell Van Hout	Australia	Colombia–Selle Italia	153	
49	Trent Wilson	Australia	Colombia–Selle Italia	151	
51	Francesco Bellotti	Italy	Crédit Agricole	36	
52	Pietro Caucchioli	Italy	Crédit Agricole	8	
53	Julian Dean	New Zealand	Crédit Agricole	DNF	
54	Jaan Kirsipuu	Estonia	Crédit Agricole	DNF	
55	Christophe Le Mével	France	Crédit Agricole	26	
56	Dimitry Muravyev	Ukraine	Crédit Agricole	92	
57	Yannick Talabardon	France	Crédit Agricole	78	
58	Bradley Wiggins	Great Britain	Crédit Agricole	123	
59	Patrice Halgand	France	Crédit Agricole	23	
61	Mauricio Ardila	Colombia	Davitamon–Lotto	27	
62	Christophe Brandt	Belgium	Davitamon–Lotto	33	
63	Nick Gates	Australia	Davitamon–Lotto	DNF	
64	Björn Leukemans	Belgium	Davitamon–Lotto	106	
65	Robbie McEwen	Australia	Davitamon–Lotto	DNF	
66	Tom Steels	Belgium	Davitamon–Lotto	DNF	
67	Wim Van Huffel	Belgium	Davitamon–Lotto	11	
68	Aart Vierhouten	Netherlands	Davitamon–Lotto	DNF	
69	Henk Vogels	Australia	Davitamon–Lotto	136	
71	Paolo Savoldelli	Italy	Discovery Channel	1	
72	Michael Barry	Canada	Discovery Channel	101	
73	Volodymyr Bileka	Ukraine	Discovery Channel	91	
74	Antonio Cruz	United States	Discovery Channel	129	
75	Tom Danielson	United States	Discovery Channel	DNF	
76	Ryder Hesjedal	Canada	Discovery Channel	DNF	
77	Benoît Joachim	Luxembourg	Discovery Channel	107	
78	Jason McCartney	United States	Discovery Channel	138	
79	Pavel Padrnos	Czech Republic	Discovery Channel	60	
81	Serhiy Honchar	Ukraine	Domina Vacanze	6	
82	Wladimir Belli	Italy	Domina Vacanze	24	
83	Simone Cadamuro	Italy	Domina Vacanze	DNF	
84	Mirko Celestino	Italy	Domina Vacanze	34	
85	Marco Fertonani	Italy	Domina Vacanze	DNF	
86	Ruslan Ivanov	Moldova	Domina Vacanze	70	
87	Mirco Lorenzetto	Italy	Domina Vacanze	109	
88	Ivan Quaranta	Italy	Domina Vacanze	DNF	
89	Alessandro Vanotti	Italy	Domina Vacanze	74	
91	Unai Etxebarria	Venezuela	Euskaltel–Euskadi	145	
92	Aitor González	Spain	Euskaltel–Euskadi	DNF	
93	Roberto Laiseka	Spain	Euskaltel–Euskadi	52	
94	Alberto López de Munain	Spain	Euskaltel–Euskadi	DNF	
95	David López	Spain	Euskaltel–Euskadi	DNF	
96	Gorka Verdugo	Spain	Euskaltel–Euskadi	68	
97	Haimar Zubeldia	Spain	Euskaltel–Euskadi	49	
98	Igor Antón	Spain	Euskaltel–Euskadi	83	
99	Samuel Sánchez	Spain	Euskaltel–Euskadi	17	
101	Alessandro Petacchi	Italy	Fassa Bortolo	100	
102	Fabio Baldato	Italy	Fassa Bortolo	130	
103	Marzio Bruseghin	Italy	Fassa Bortolo	9	
104	Massimo Codol	Italy	Fassa Bortolo	119	
105	Volodymir Hustov	Ukraine	Fassa Bortolo	93	
106	Alberto Ongarato	Italy	Fassa Bortolo	99	
107	Fabio Sacchi	Italy	Fassa Bortolo	96	
108	Matteo Tosatto	Italy	Fassa Bortolo	122	
109	Marco Velo	Italy	Fassa Bortolo	103	
111	Carlos Da Cruz	France	Française des Jeux	72	
112	Christophe Detilloux	Belgium	Française des Jeux	DNF	
113	Freddy Bichot	France	Française des Jeux	DNF	
114	Cyrille Monnerais	France	Française des Jeux	71	
115	Lilian Jégou	France	Française des Jeux	98	
116	Mark Renshaw	Australia	Française des Jeux	144	
117	Baden Cooke	Australia	Française des Jeux	DNF	
118	Sandy Casar	France	Française des Jeux	81	
119	Matthew Wilson	Australia	Française des Jeux	146	
121	Robert Förster	Germany	Gerolsteiner	137	
122	Markus Fothen	Germany	Gerolsteiner	12	
123	Frank Høj	Denmark	Gerolsteiner	152	
124	Andrea Moletta	Italy	Gerolsteiner	118	
125	Sven Montgomery	Switzerland	Gerolsteiner	59	
126	Volker Ordowski	Germany	Gerolsteiner	DNF	
127	Sven Krauss	Germany	Gerolsteiner	132	
128	Marcel Strauss	Switzerland	Gerolsteiner	102	
129	Thomas Ziegler	Germany	Gerolsteiner	DNF	
131	José Luis Carrasco	Spain	Illes Balears–Caisse d'Epargne	90	
132	Sergi Escobar	Spain	Illes Balears–Caisse d'Epargne	DNF	
133	Isaac Gálvez	Spain	Illes Balears–Caisse d'Epargne	131	
134	Joan Horrach	Spain	Illes Balears–Caisse d'Epargne	37	
135	Vladimir Karpets	Russia	Illes Balears–Caisse d'Epargne	7	
136	David Navas	Spain	Illes Balears–Caisse d'Epargne	DNF	
137	Unai Osa	Spain	Illes Balears–Caisse d'Epargne	16	
138	Vicente Reynés	Spain	Illes Balears–Caisse d'Epargne	DNF	
139	Antonio Tauler	Spain	Illes Balears–Caisse d'Epargne	126	
141	René Andrle	Czech Republic	Liberty Seguros–Würth	62	
142	Dariusz Baranowski	Poland	Liberty Seguros–Würth	57	
143	Joseba Beloki	Spain	Liberty Seguros–Würth	DNF	
144	Giampaolo Caruso	Italy	Liberty Seguros–Würth	19	
145	Koldo Gil	Spain	Liberty Seguros–Würth	DNF	
146	Jan Hruška	Czech Republic	Liberty Seguros–Würth	61	
147	Javier Ramírez	Spain	Liberty Seguros–Würth	65	
148	Michele Scarponi	Italy	Liberty Seguros–Würth	47	
151	Danilo Di Luca	Italy	Liquigas–Bianchi	4	
152	Dario Andriotto	Italy	Liquigas–Bianchi	97	
153	Dario Cioni	Italy	Liquigas–Bianchi	13	
154	Patrick Calcagni	Switzerland	Liquigas–Bianchi	DNF	
155	Stefano Garzelli	Italy	Liquigas–Bianchi	DNF	
156	Vladimir Miholjević	Croatia	Liquigas–Bianchi	31	
157	Marco Milesi	Italy	Liquigas–Bianchi	124	
158	Andrea Noè	Italy	Liquigas–Bianchi	45	
159	Charly Wegelius	Great Britain	Liquigas–Bianchi	46	
161	Aurélien Clerc	Switzerland	Phonak	150	
162	José Ignacio Gutiérrez	Spain	Phonak	133	
163	Uroš Murn	Slovenia	Phonak	94	
164	Grégory Rast	Switzerland	Phonak	120	
165	Daniel Schnider	Switzerland	Phonak	76	
166	Johann Tschopp	Switzerland	Phonak	41	
167	Sascha Urweider	Switzerland	Phonak	139	
168	Tadej Valjavec	Slovenia	Phonak	15	
169	Steve Zampieri	Switzerland	Phonak	30	
171	Paolo Bettini	Italy	Quick-Step–Innergetic	38	
172	Davide Bramati	Italy	Quick-Step–Innergetic	127	
173	Mads Christensen	Denmark	Quick-Step–Innergetic	142	
174	Addy Engels	Netherlands	Quick-Step–Innergetic	69	
175	José Antonio Garrido	Spain	Quick-Step–Innergetic	121	
176	Cristian Moreni	Italy	Quick-Step–Innergetic	53	
177	Nick Nuyens	Belgium	Quick-Step–Innergetic	DNF	
178	Filippo Pozzato	Italy	Quick-Step–Innergetic	84	
179	Stefano Zanini	Italy	Quick-Step–Innergetic	111	
181	Thomas Dekker	Netherlands	Rabobank	75	
182	Theo Eltink	Netherlands	Rabobank	29	
183	Alexandr Kolobnev	Russia	Rabobank	21	
184	Grischa Niermann	Germany	Rabobank	51	
185	Michael Rasmussen	Denmark	Rabobank	DNF	
186	Roy Sentjens	Netherlands	Rabobank	135	
187	Rory Sutherland	Australia	Rabobank	108	
188	Thorwald Veneberg	Netherlands	Rabobank	DNF	
189	Steven de Jongh	Netherlands	Rabobank	DNF	
191	Juan Manuel Gárate	Spain	Saunier Duval–Prodir	5	
192	Ángel Gómez	Spain	Saunier Duval–Prodir	79	
193	Rubén Lobato	Spain	Saunier Duval–Prodir	43	
194	Manuele Mori	Italy	Saunier Duval–Prodir	85	
195	Marco Pinotti	Italy	Saunier Duval–Prodir	48	
196	Juan José Cobo	Spain	Saunier Duval–Prodir	DNF	
197	Joaquim Rodríguez	Spain	Saunier Duval–Prodir	80	
198	Francisco Ventoso	Spain	Saunier Duval–Prodir	DNF	
199	Oliver Zaugg	Switzerland	Saunier Duval–Prodir	DNF	
201	Ivan Basso	Italy	Team CSC	28	
202	Andrea Peron	Italy	Team CSC	77	
203	Fränk Schleck	Luxembourg	Team CSC	42	
204	Peter Luttenberger	Austria	Team CSC	87	
205	Giovanni Lombardi	Italy	Team CSC	88	
206	Michael Blaudzun	Denmark	Team CSC	73	
207	David Zabriskie	United States	Team CSC	104	
208	Christian Vande Velde	United States	Team CSC	114	
209	Brian Vandborg	Denmark	Team CSC	140	
211	Erik Baumann	Germany	T-Mobile Team	128	
212	Matthias Kessler	Germany	T-Mobile Team	25	
213	André Korff	Germany	T-Mobile Team	113	
214	Daniele Nardello	Italy	T-Mobile Team	DNF	
215	Olaf Pollack	Germany	T-Mobile Team	DNF	
216	Jan Schaffrath	Germany	T-Mobile Team	56	
217	Bram Schmitz	Netherlands	T-Mobile Team	115	
218	Christian Werner	Germany	T-Mobile Team	58	
219	Erik Zabel	Germany	T-Mobile Team	63	
