= 2004 UCI Road World Championships – Men's road race =

Men's Individual Road Race
2004 UCI Road World Championships
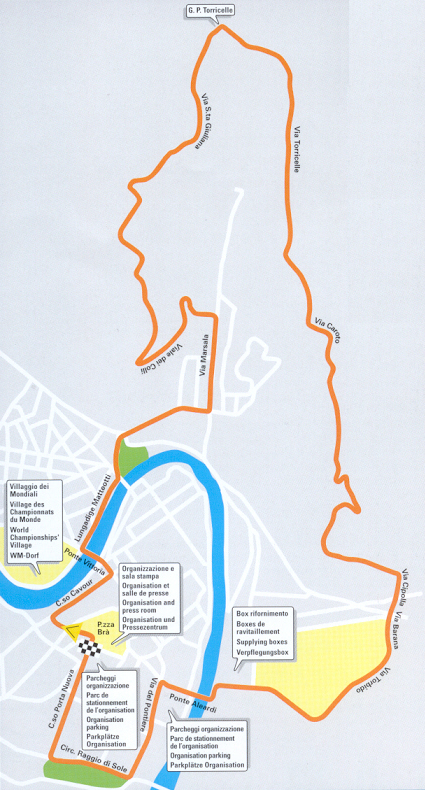

Race details
- Dates: October 3, 2004
- Stages: 1
- Distance: 265.5 km (165.0 mi)
- Winning time: 06h 57' 15"

Medalists
	Gold	Óscar Freire (ESP)	(Spain)
	Silver	Erik Zabel (GER)	(Germany)
	Bronze	Luca Paolini (ITA)	(Italy)

These are the results for the 2004 UCI Road World Championships bicycle race road race. The men's elite race was held on Sunday October 3, 2004 in Verona, Italy, over a total distance of 265.5 kilometres.

== Final classification ==
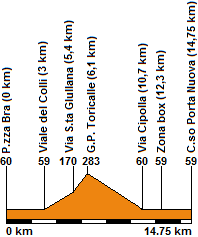
Race profile of the 14.75 km long circuit

Rank	Rider	Time
1st place, gold medalist(s)	Óscar Freire (ESP)	06:57:15
2nd place, silver medalist(s)	Erik Zabel (GER)	—
3rd place, bronze medalist(s)	Luca Paolini (ITA)	—
4.	Stuart O'Grady (AUS)	—
5.	Allan Davis (AUS)	—
6.	Alejandro Valverde (ESP)	—
7.	Michael Boogerd (NED)	—
8.	Chris Horner (USA)	—
9.	Damiano Cunego (ITA)	—
10.	Fränk Schleck (LUX)	—
11.	Ivan Basso (ITA)	—
12.	Francisco Mancebo (ESP)	—
13.	Michael Rasmussen (DEN)	—
14.	Danilo Hondo (GER)	—
15.	Marcos Antonio Serrano (ESP)	—
16.	Alexander Vinokourov (KAZ)	+ 0.05
17.	Luis Pérez Rodríguez (ESP)	+ 0.09
18.	Steffen Wesemann (GER)	+ 0.26
19.	Matthias Kessler (GER)	+ 0.58
20.	Karsten Kroon (NED)	+ 1.39
21.	Mauricio Ardila (COL)	—
22.	Dario Frigo (ITA)	+ 1.41
23.	Leonardo Bertagnolli (ITA)	—
24.	Iván Parra (COL)	+ 3.09
25.	Dimitri Konyshev (RUS)	+ 4.26
26.	Martin Elmiger (SUI)	—
27.	Erki Pütsep (EST)	—
28.	Mikhaylo Khalilov (UKR)	—
29.	Peter Van Petegem (BEL)	—
30.	Uroš Murn (SLO)	—
31.	Geert Verheyen (BEL)	—
32.	Jérôme Pineau (FRA)	—
33.	Fabian Wegmann (GER)	—
34.	Cezary Zamana (POL)	—
35.	Grégory Rast (SUI)	—
36.	Luis Felipe Laverde (COL)	—
37.	Kurt Asle Arvesen (NOR)	—
38.	Roger Beuchat (SUI)	—
39.	Nicki Sørensen (DEN)	—
40.	Alexander Bocharov (RUS)	—
41.	Harald Morscher (AUT)	—
42.	Matej Mugerli (SLO)	—
43.	Daniel Schnider (SUI)	—
44.	Ruslan Ivanov (MDA)	—
45.	Constantino Zaballa (ESP)	—
46.	David Moncoutié (FRA)	—
47.	Fredy González (COL)	—
48.	Nicolas Vogondy (FRA)	—
49.	Igor Pugaci (MDA)	—
50.	David O'Loughlin (IRL)	—
51.	Serge Baguet (BEL)	—
52.	Johan Van Summeren (BEL)	—
53.	Peter Luttenberger (AUT)	—
54.	Alexandre Bazhenov (RUS)	—
55.	Volodymir Gustov (UKR)	—
56.	Ondřej Sosenka (CZE)	—
57.	Tomáš Konečný (CZE)	—
58.	Jure Golčer (SLO)	—
59.	Luca Mazzanti (ITA)	—
60.	Fabian Jeker (SUI)	—
61.	Romans Vainsteins (LAT)	—
62.	Cristian Moreni (ITA)	—
63.	Isidro Nozal (ESP)	+ 4.34
64.	Igor Astarloa (ESP)	—
65.	Franco Pellizotti (ITA)	—
66.	Rolf Aldag (GER)	—
67.	Daniele Nardello (ITA)	—
68.	Christophe Rinero (FRA)	+ 6.23
69.	Juan Antonio Flecha (ESP)	—
70.	Vladimir Gusev (RUS)	—
71.	Steve Zampieri (SUI)	—
72.	Vladimir Duma (UKR)	—
73.	Marius Sabaliauskas (LTU)	+ 8.06
74.	David McCann (IRL)	+ 9.54
75.	Eric Leblacher (FRA)	—
76.	Pedro Cardoso (POR)	—
77.	Mateusz Mróz (POL)	—
78.	Gustav Larsson (SWE)	—
79.	Guido Trenti (USA)	—
80.	Patrick Calcagni (SUI)	—
81.	Michael Rogers (AUS)	—
82.	Bram Tankink (NED)	—
83.	Nico Sijmens (BEL)	+ 9.57
84.	Nick Nuyens (BEL)	—
85.	Frank Høj (DEN)	+ 10.30
86.	Matej Jurčo (SVK)	+ 28.45
87.	Charles Dionne (CAN)	—
88.	Morten Hegreberg (NOR)	—
DID NOT FINISH
	Erik Dekker (NED)	
Gerben Löwik (NED)
Koos Moerenhout (NED)
Stephan Schreck (GER)
Cadel Evans (AUS)
Nélson Vitorino (POR)
Sergey Lagutin (UZB)
José Iván Gutiérrez (ESP)
Wim Van Huffel (BEL)
Stefano Garzelli (ITA)
Jan Boven (NED)
Maarten den Bakker (NED)
Marc Lotz (NED)
Pieter Weening (NED)
Simon Gerrans (AUS)
Luke Roberts (AUS)
Matthew White (AUS)
Michael Albasini (SUI)
Markus Zberg (SUI)
Mikhail Timochine (RUS)
Aleksandr Kuschynski (BLR)
Gerhard Trampusch (AUT)
Laurent Brochard (FRA)
Sylvain Calzati (FRA)
Nuno Alves (POR)
Hélder Miranda (POR)
Bartosz Huzarski (POL)
Sebastian Skiba (POL)
Raimondas Rumšas (LTU)
Philippe Gilbert (BEL)
Jurgen Van Goolen (BEL)
Paolo Bettini (ITA)
Roberto Petito (ITA)
Ronny Scholz (GER)
Christian Werner (GER)
Scott Davis (AUS)
Mathew Hayman (AUS)
Marcel Strauss (SUI)
Johann Tschopp (SUI)
Andrey Klyuev (RUS)
Chris Baldwin (USA)
Michael Creed (USA)
Tom Danielson (USA)
Christian Vande Velde (USA)
Leonardo Duque (COL)
Denys Kostyuk (UKR)
Yaroslav Popovych (UKR)
Hugo Sabido (POR)
Dmitriy Fofonov (KAZ)
Serguei Yakovlev (KAZ)
Przemyslaw Niemec (POL)
Marek Rutkiewicz (POL)
Alejandro Borrajo (ARG)
Eladio Jiménez (ESP)
Markus Fothen (GER)
Sebastian Lang (GER)
Cyril Dessel (FRA)
Pedro Horrillo (ESP)
Paul Crake (AUS)
Kristjan Fajt (SLO)
Peter Wrolich (AUT)
Volodymyr Bileka (UKR)
Krzysztof Ciesielski (POL)
Kjell Carlström (FIN)
José Luis Rubiera (ESP)
Maxime Monfort (BEL)
Marc Wauters (BEL)
Filippo Simeoni (ITA)
Bram de Groot (NED)
Thorwald Veneberg (NED)
Lars Bak (DEN)
Michael Blaudzun (DEN)
René Jørgensen (DEN)
Michael Skelde (DEN)
Michael Barry (CAN)
Stefan Schumacher (GER)
David McPartland (AUS)
Fabian Cancellara (SUI)
Alexandr Arekeev (RUS)
Vladimir Efimkin (RUS)
Viatcheslav Ekimov (RUS)
Serguei Ivanov (RUS)
Alexandr Kolobnev (RUS)
Oleg Zhukov (RUS)
Jonathan Patrick McCarty (USA)
Jason McCartney (USA)
Fred Rodriguez (USA)
Christophe Le Mével (FRA)
Franck Rénier (FRA)
Benoît Joachim (LUX)
Tom Southam (GBR)
Yuriy Krivtsov (UKR)
Andrey Kashechkin (KAZ)
Shinri Suzuki (JPN)
Marcus Ljungqvist (SWE)
Allan Johansen (DEN)
Kirk O'Bee (USA)
Kyrylo Pospyeyev (UKR)
Jarosław Welniak (POL)
Mirko Poldma (EST)
Tom Boonen (BEL)
Yannick Talabardon (FRA)
Charly Wegelius (GBR)
László Garamszegi (HUN)
Mads Kaggestad (NOR)
Julio Alberto Pérez (MEX)
Stefan Adamsson (SWE)
Jonas Ljungblad (SWE)
Sandy Casar (FRA)
Luciano Pagliarini (BRA)
Raivis Belohvoščiks (LAT)
Murilo Fischer (BRA)
