= Rheinland-Pfalz Rundfahrt =

Race details
- Date: April–May
- Region: Rhineland-Palatinate
- English name: International Rhineland-Palatinate Tour
- Local name(s): International Rheinland-Pfalz Rundfahrt (in German)
- Discipline: Road
- Competition: UCI Europe Tour
- Type: Stage race
- Web site: rlp.rad-net.de

History
- First edition: 1966
- Editions: 42
- Final edition: 2007
- First winner: Ortwin Czarnowksi (GER)
- Final winner: Gerald Ciolek (GER)

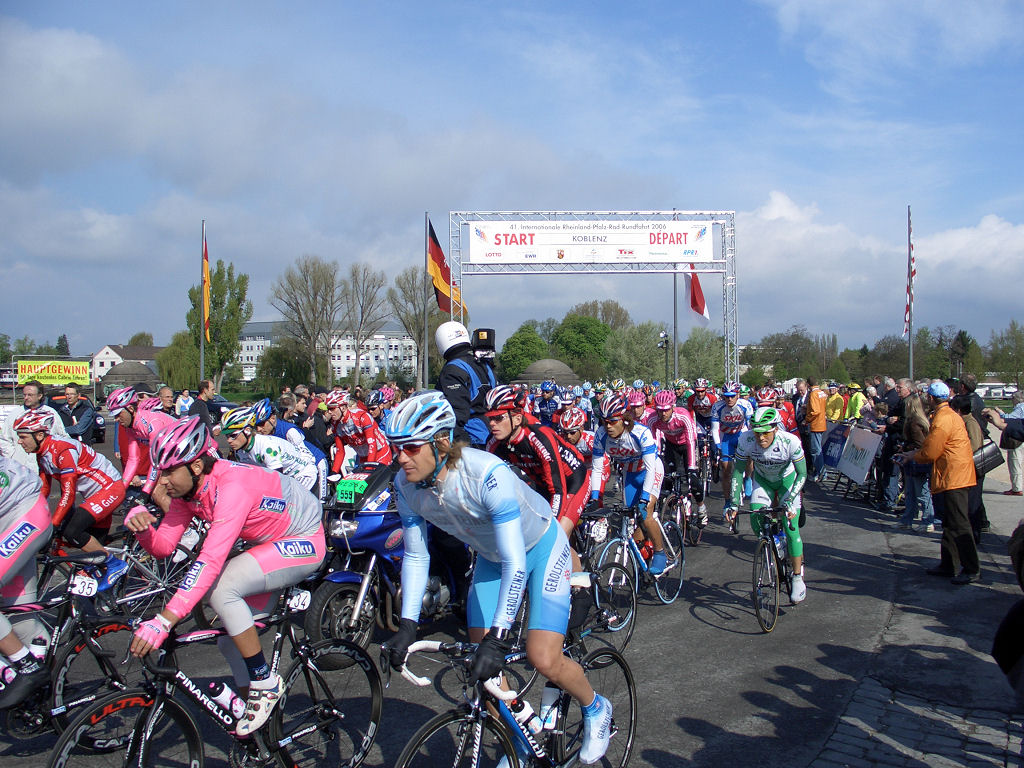
Start of the Rheinland-Pfalz Rundfahrt 2006 in Koblenz

The International Rheinland-Pfalz Rundfahrt was a multi-stage road bicycle race held in Rhineland-Palatinate, Germany. In the years from 1966 to 2007, it was considered one of the biggest sporting events in Rhineland-Palatinate. No other city was as often the stage destination of the Rheinland-Pfalz Rundfahrt as Bad Marienberg.

In its early years, it was an amateur race. The edition of 1969 was notable for the domination of Fedor den Hertog, winning nine of the eleven stages, and the overall classification with a large margin. After 2005 it was part of the UCI Europe Tour and part of the new German Championship (TUI Cup). In the past the race took place in September during the Vuelta a España. Starting in 2005, the race, classified in category 2.1 due to the newly introduced UCI ProTour, took place in May during the Giro d'Italia and just before the Tour of Catalonia.

Since 1981, a mountain and a sprint classification have been introduced. In 2007, for the first time a classification for the best young professional was introduced (blue jersey).

Due to the cases of doping in cycling, the Rheinland-Pfalz Rundfahrt was cancelled in 2008. The Minister of the Interior of Rhineland-Palatinate, Karl Peter Bruch, announced that the state would not issue a permit for the race from 2008 and that the police would not be called off. "The current extent of the doping allegations has prompted the state government to suspend the financing of the Rheinland-Pfalz Rundfahrt for the year 2008. We feel compelled to send this clear signal," said Bruch. As a result, it is unlikely that the tour will be held after 2008. Another setback in this respect is the dissolution of the organising association "Internationale Rheinland-Pfalz-Rad-Rundfahrt" on 5 December 2007. The official reason for this step is the resulting cost savings.

== Winners ==
Year	Country	Rider	Team
1966	West Germany	Ortwin Czarnowski	
1967	West Germany	Martin Gombert	
1968	West Germany	Ortwin Czarnowski	
1969	Netherlands	Fedor den Hertog	
1970	West Germany	Karl-Heinz Muddemann	
1971	West Germany	Dieter Koslar	
1972	West Germany	Karl-Heinz Küster	
1973	West Germany	Peter Weibel	
1974	Netherlands	Aad van den Hoek	
1975	Norway	Thorleif Andersen	
1976	Poland	Mieczysław Nowicki	
1977	Poland	Krzysztof Sujka	
1978	Netherlands	Theo de Rooy	
1979	Norway	Jostein Wilmann	
1980	Denmark	Thomas Möller	
1981	Czechoslovakia	Ladislav Ferebauer	
1982	Austria	Helmut Wechselberger	
1983	East Germany	Dan Radtke	
1984	Czechoslovakia	Milan Jurčo	
1985	East Germany	Olaf Ludwig	
1986	East Germany	Thomas Barth	
1987	East Germany	Mario Kummer	
1988	West Germany	Christian Henn	
1989	Poland	Joachim Halupczok	
1990	West Germany	Kai Hundertmarck	
1991	Germany	Gerd Audehm	
1992	Germany	Gerd Audehm	
1993	Germany	Bert Dietz	
1994	France	Cédric Vasseur	
1995	Germany	Jörn Reuss	
1996	Germany	Olaf Ludwig	
1997	Latvia	Dainis Ozols	
1998	United States	Lance Armstrong	
1999	Belgium	Marc Wauters	
2000	Belgium	Marc Wauters	
2001	Netherlands	Erik Dekker	
2002	Germany	Ronny Scholz	
2003	Italy	Daniele Nardello	
2004	Germany	Björn Glasner	
2005	Germany	Michael Rich	
2006	Austria	René Haselbacher	
2007	Germany	Gerald Ciolek	
