= 2006 GP Miguel Induráin =

Race details
- Dates: 1 April 2006
- Stages: 1
- Distance: 191 km (118.7 mi)
- Winning time: 4h 41' 38"

Results
	Winner	Fabian Wegmann (GER)
	Second	Andrea Moletta (ITA)
	Third	Andriy Hrivko (UKR)

The 2006 GP Miguel Induráin was the 53rd edition of the GP Miguel Induráin cycle race and was held on 1 April 2006. The race was won by Fabian Wegmann.

== General classification ==
Final general classification

Rank	Rider	Time
1	Fabian Wegmann (GER)	4h 41' 38"
2	Andrea Moletta (ITA)	+ 0"
3	Andriy Hrivko (UKR)	+ 0"
4	Stefano Garzelli (ITA)	+ 0"
5	Manuele Mori (ITA)	+ 0"
6	Cristian Moreni (ITA)	+ 0"
7	Aitor Osa (ESP)	+ 0"
8	Jordi Berenguer (ESP)	+ 6"
9	Alberto Contador (ESP)	+ 6"
10	Jon Bru (ESP)	+ 6"
