= Ortwin Czarnowski =

German cyclist (born 1940)

Personal information
- Born: 21 July 1940 (age 86) Tempelberg, Nazi Germany

Cycling career
- Sport: Cycling

Ortwin Czarnowski (born 21 July 1940) is a German former cyclist. He competed in the individual road race and the team time trial events at the 1968 Summer Olympics.
