= Gerd Audehm =

German cyclist

Personal information
- Born: 14 August 1968 (age 58) Schipkau, Bezirk Cottbus, East Germany

Cycling career
- Sport: Cycling
- Current team: Retired
- Discipline: Road
- Role: Rider

Amateur teams
- 1989–1990: SC Cottbus
- 1991: RSG Nürnberger

Professional teams
- 1993–1996: Team Telekom
- 1997–1998: Team Nürnberger

Major wins
- Rheinland-Pfalz-Rundfahrt (1991, 1992)

Gerd Audehm (born 14 August 1968 in Schipkau, Bezirk Cottbus) is a German former professional cyclist. He rode four seasons for Team Telekom.

In 2000 Audehm, was in a coma for a month, because he had a lack of oxygen in his brain caused by an accident in the gym.

He rode in 2 editions of the Tour de France, in 1993 and 1994. He finished in 99th place in 1993 and 28th place in 1994.

== Major results ==
1988
1st Stage 1 Tour of Austria
1989
1st Stage 8 Tour of Greece
1991
1st Overall Rheinland-Pfalz-Rundfahrt
9th Overall Peace Race
1992
1st Overall Rheinland-Pfalz-Rundfahrt
1995
3rd Clásica de Sabiñánigo
1996
6th Overall Tour du Limousin
1997
9th Overall Tour of Austria

=== Grand Tour general classification results timeline ===
Grand Tour	1993	1994	1995	1996
Vuelta a España	—	—	DNF	58
Giro d'Italia	—	—	—	—
Tour de France	99	28	—	—

Legend
—	Did not compete
DNF	Did not finish
