= Aaron Olsen =

American professional road bicycle racer (born 1978)

Aaron Olson
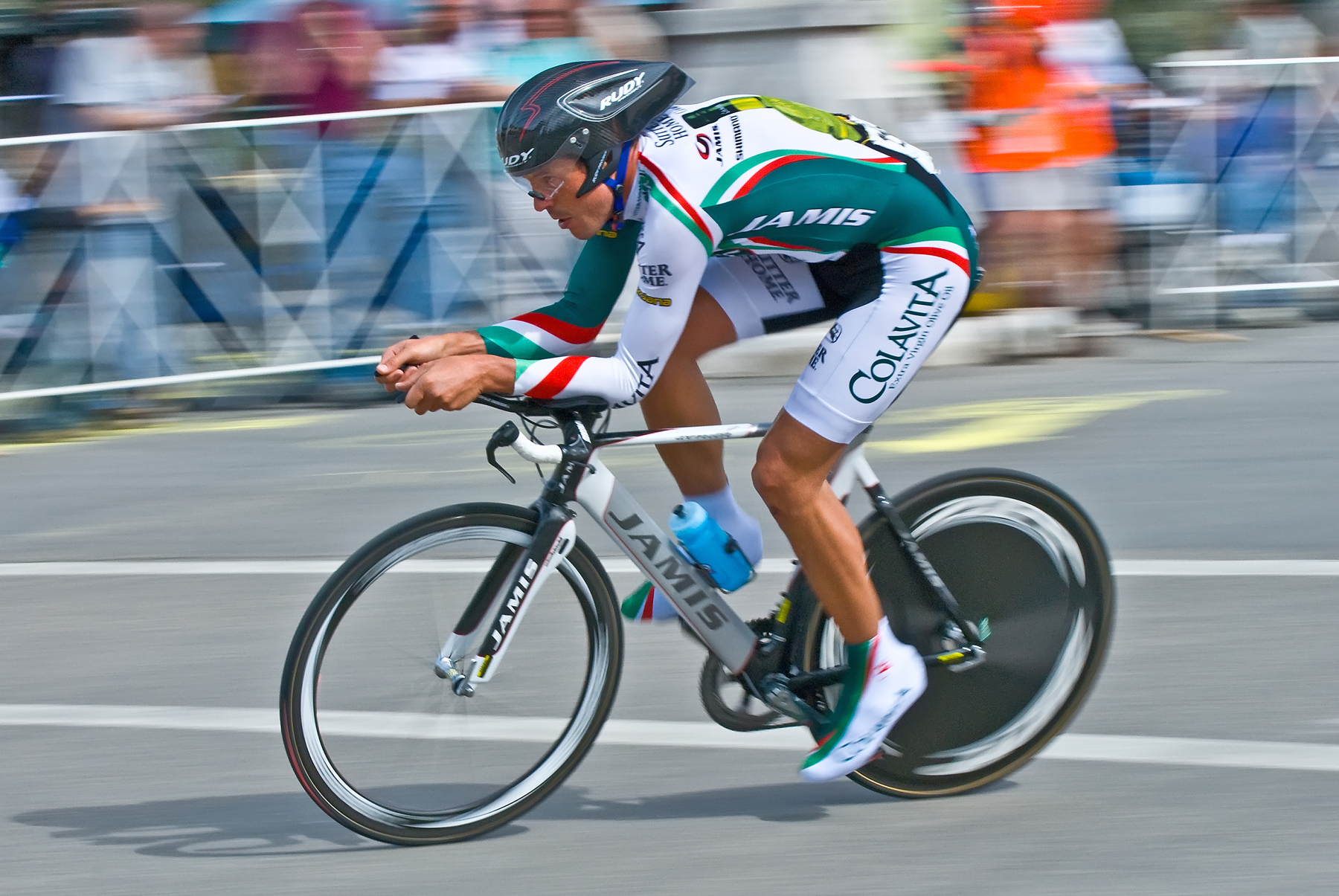
- Olson at the 2009 Tour of California

Personal information
- Born: 11 January 1978 (age 48) Eugene, Oregon

Cycling career
- Sport: Cycling
- Current team: Retired
- Discipline: Road
- Role: Rider

Professional teams
- 2001: Prime Alliance
- 2002: iTeamNova.com
- 2003: Schroeder Iron
- 2004–2005: Colavita–Bolla Wines
- 2006: Saunier Duval–Prodir
- 2007: T-Mobile Team
- 2008: Bissell
- 2009: Colavita–Sutter Home

Aaron Olson (born January 11, 1978) is an American professional road bicycle racer. Olson was raised in Eugene, Oregon. Olson owns and operates Handlebar Coffee Roasters with two locations based in Santa Barbara, CA.

== Palmares ==
2000
3rd National U23 Road Race Championships
2003
1st Overall Valley of the Sun Stage Race
2004
1st Stage 6 Tour de Beauce
1st Stage 5 Tour de Toona
