= Renaud Dion =

French cyclist

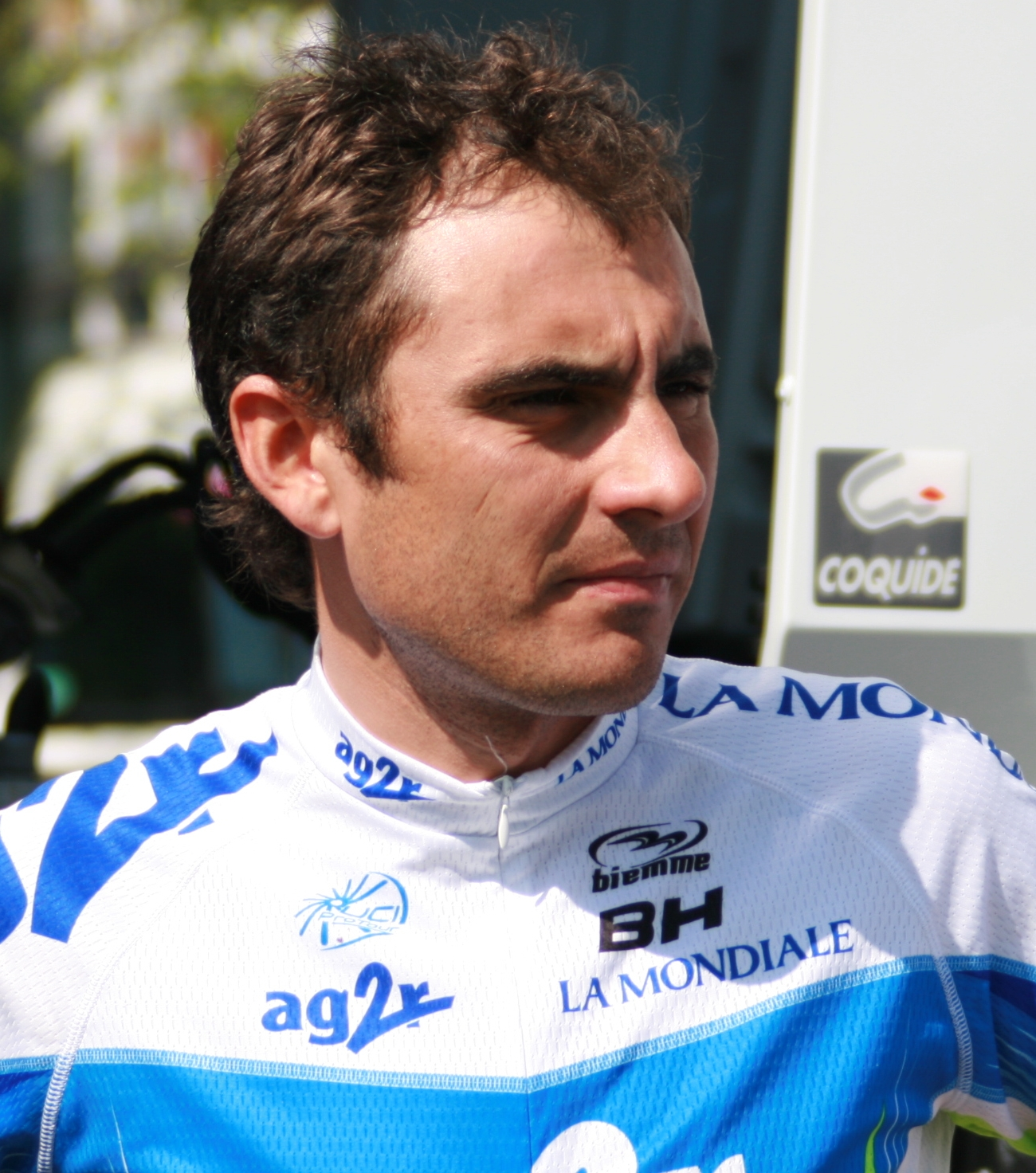

Personal information
- Full name: Renaud Dion
- Born: 6 January 1978 (age 48) Gien, France
- Height: 1.78 m (5 ft 10 in)
- Weight: 65 kg (143 lb)

Cycling career
- Sport: Cycling
- Current team: Retired
- Discipline: Road
- Role: Rider

Amateur teams
- 2001: Bataillon de Joinville
- 2002–2003: EC St-Etienne Loire

Professional teams
- 2004–2005: R.A.G.T. Semences–MG Rover
- 2006–2009: AG2R Prévoyance
- 2010: Roubaix–Lille Métropole
- 2011–2013: Bretagne–Schuller

Major wins
- Memorial Samyn (2006); Route Adélie (2011)

Renaud Dion (born 6 January 1978) is a French former professional road racing cyclist, who competed professionally between 2004 and 2013 for the R.A.G.T. Semences, Ag2r–La Mondiale, Roubaix–Lille Métropole and Bretagne–Séché Environnement teams. His sporting career began with UC Gien Sport.

== Major results ==
2006
1st Memorial Samyn
2010
2nd Tro-Bro Léon
2011
1st Route Adélie
2013
8th Overall Tour de Normandie
