= Jan Schaffrath =

German cyclist

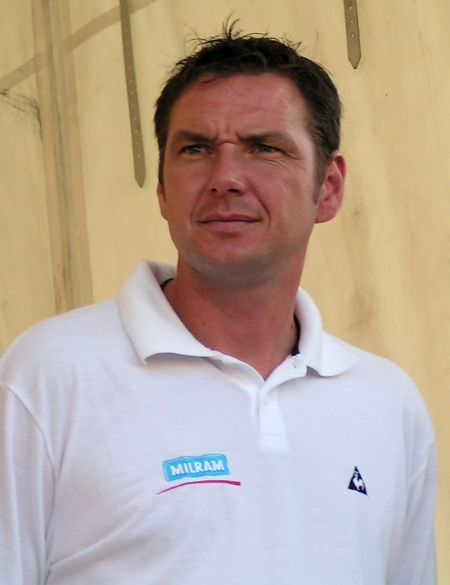
- Schaffrath at the 2006 Deutschland Tour

Personal information
- Full name: Jan Schaffrath
- Born: 17 September 1971 (age 55) Berlin, Germany

Cycling career
- Sport: Cycling
- Current team: Omega Pharma–Quick-Step
- Discipline: Road
- Role: Directeur sportif (Former rider)

Amateur team
- TSC Berlin

Professional team
- 1997–2005: T-Mobile-Team

Managerial teams
- 2006: Team Milram
- 2007–2011: HTC–Highroad
- 2012-: Omega Pharma–Quick-Step

Jan Schaffrath (born March 16, 1971, in Berlin) is a German directeur sportif for UCI ProTeam Omega Pharma–Quick-Step and former professional road bicycle racer. Before turning professional he was twice military World Champion. At the 1994 UCI Road World Championships he won the bronze medal in the men's team time trail. He raced as a professional from 1997 until 2005, all the time at T-Mobile Team. At the end of 2005 he retired and moved to Team Milram as a directeur sportif, but only lasted one season there before returning to T-Mobile as a directeur sportif, which later changed its name to Team High Road and Team Columbia. After HTC did not find a new sponsor, he moved to the Belgian team Omega Pharma–Quick-Step.
