= Sergei Yakovlev (cyclist) =

Kazakhstani cyclist (born 1976)

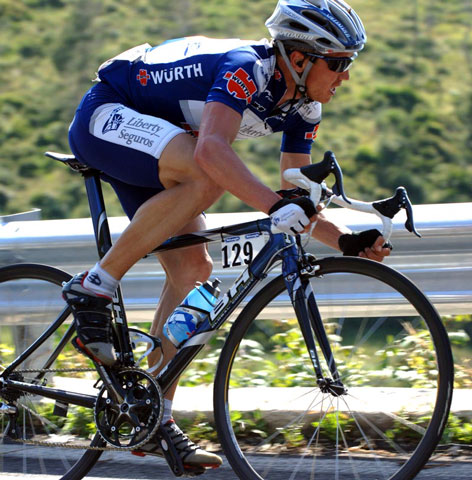

Personal information
- Full name: Sergei Yakovlev; Сергей Яковлев
- Born: April 21, 1976 (age 50) Temirtau, Karaganda Region, Kazakh SSR, Soviet Union
- Height: 1.74 m (5 ft 9 in)
- Weight: 62 kg (137 lb)

Cycling career
- Sport: Cycling
- Discipline: Road
- Role: Rider

Professional teams
- 1999–2000: Besson Chaussures
- 2001: Cantina Tollo–Acqua & Sapone
- 2002–2005: Team Telekom
- 2006: Liberty Seguros–Würth
- 2007–2008: Astana

Major wins
- Tour de l'Ain (2000)

Sergei Yakovlev, (Kazakh: Сергей Яковлев, born April 21, 1976, in Temirtau, Karaganda Region, Soviet Union, now Kazakhstan) is a Kazakhstani (ethnic Russian) professional road bicycle racer. He is currently without a team. He turned professional in 1999 and rode for Besson Chaussures for two seasons, then Acqua & Sapone and then he moved to Team Telekom which became T-Mobile. After fellow Kazakhstani Alexander Vinokourov left T-Mobile at the end of 2005, Yakovlev went with him to Liberty Seguros-Würth team and then the Astana cycling team. Yakovlev's victories include being the national champion of Kazakhstan in 2000, the 2000 edition of the Tour de l'Ain and a stage in the Tour de Suisse.

== Major results ==
- Tour d'Indonesia - 1 stage (2005)
- Tour de Suisse - 1 stage (2003)
- Kazakhstan National Road Race Champion (2000)
- Tour de l'Ain (2000)
- Asian Road Race Champion (1999)
- Circuit Franco-Belge - 1 stage (1999)
