= Andrea Moletta =

Italian cyclist

Personal information
- Full name: Andrea Moletta
- Born: 23 February 1979 (age 47) Cittadella, Italy
- Height: 1.84 m (6 ft 0 in)
- Weight: 74 kg (163 lb)

Cycling career
- Sport: Cycling
- Current team: Miche-Silver Cross
- Discipline: Road
- Role: Rider

Professional teams
- 2003: Mercatone Uno
- 2004: Barloworld
- 2005–2008: Gerolsteiner
- 2009: Miche-Silver Cross

Andrea Moletta (born 23 February 1979 in Cittadella, Province of Padua) is an Italian professional road bicycle racer for UCI Continental team Miche-Silver Cross.

In March 2007, Moletta crashed badly in the Milan-San Remo race, and it was thought that his season would be over. However, six months later Moletta was recovered and started in the 2007 Vuelta a España.

During the 2008 Giro d'Italia, Moletta's father was caught with Viagra and unidentified fluids, and as result of this, Moletta's team Gerolsteiner withdrew Moletta from racing. Viagra was not banned in competition, so no formal doping charge was filed against Moletta, although the doping authorities (WADA) were looking at the matter. Later it was found that the fluids were the hormone Lutelef, which can be used as a new form of blood doping. Moletta was later cleared from any wrongdoing.

He has previously played for Team Braloworld (2004), Mercatone Uno (2003), and Fassa Bortolo (2001).

Since 2009, Moletta rides for Miche-Silver Cross.

== Palmares ==
2000
4th Trofeo Zsšdi
2001
6th Overall Ster Elektrotoer
6th Circuito Belvedere
7th Trofeo Alcide Degasperi
2002
1st GP di Poggiana
3rd Trofeo Zsšdi
2003
1st Stage 6 Peace Race
4th Trofeo Città di Castelfidardo
9th Stausee-Rundfahrt Klingnau
2004
3rd Giro del Friuli
2005
4th San Francisco Grand Prix
2006
2nd GP Miguel Induráin
10th GP Lugano
2008
10th GP Miguel Induráin
2009
6th Giro della Provincia di Reggio Calabria
7th Overall Okolo Slovenska
7th Memorial Marco Pantani
8th Gran Premio Bruno Beghelli
