= Christophe Brandt =

Belgian cyclist (born 1977)

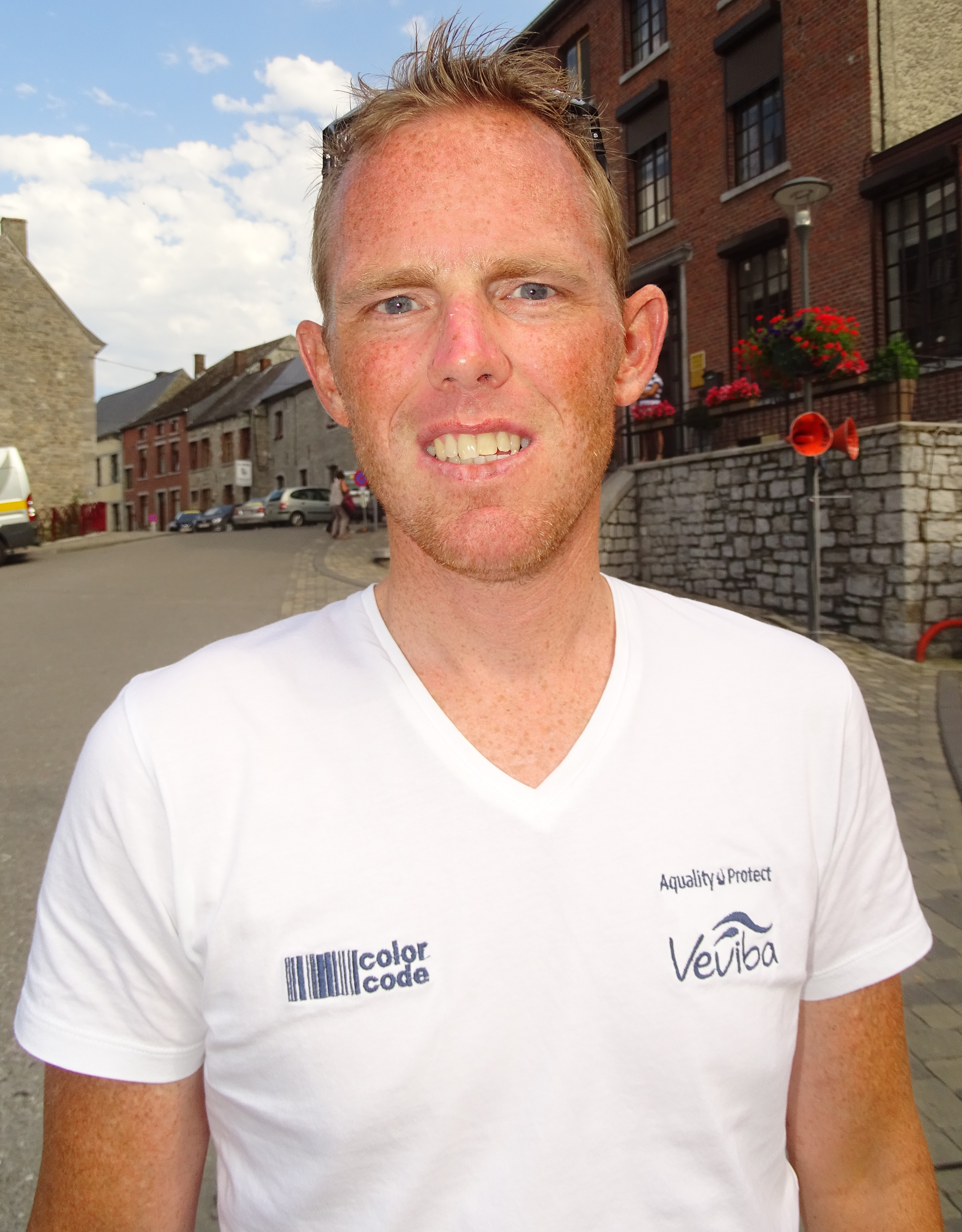
- Brandt in 2015

Personal information
- Full name: Christophe Brandt
- Born: 6 May 1977 (age 49) Liège, Belgium
- Height: 1.82 m (6 ft 0 in)
- Weight: 65 kg (143 lb)

Cycling career
- Sport: Cycling
- Current team: Wagner Bazin WB; Bingoal WB Devo Team
- Discipline: Road
- Role: Rider (retired); Directeur sportif; General manager

Professional teams
- 2000: Saeco–Valli & Valli
- 2001–2010: Lotto–Adecco

Managerial teams
- 2012–2013: Idemasport–Biowanze (directeur sportif)
- 2014–: Wallonie-Bruxelles (general manager)
- 2019–: Wallonie–Bruxelles Development Team (directeur sportif)

Christophe Brandt (born 6 May 1977) is a Belgian former professional road bicycle racer, who competed professionally between 2000 and 2010 for the Saeco–Valli & Valli and Omega Pharma–Lotto teams. He now works as the general manager for UCI ProTeam Wagner Bazin WB, and as a directeur sportif for its junior team, UCI Continental team Bingoal WB Devo Team.

== Career ==
Born in Liège, Brandt started his career with Saeco–Valli & Valli, but after one year he transferred to Lotto–Adecco and stayed there for the rest of his career. In the early 2000s he was a good rider in the Grand Tours, like a 14th place in the 2004 Giro d'Italia and 33rd in the 2002 Tour de France. In 2004, he returned a positive test for methadone. He believed the test was a result of a tainted nutritional supplement that he had taken to cure a liver problem. The chemist who had prepared Brandt's prescription confirmed he had been working with methadone on the same day he had prepared Brandt's prescription. This did not satisfy Brandt's team management, who fired him. However, later in the year the Belgian Cycling Federation exonerated Brandt, and his Lotto–Domo team rehired him. He stayed with them for the remainder of his career before retiring from competition in 2010. After two years with Color Code–Biowanze as a directeur sportif, Brandt joined the Wallonie-Bruxelles team in 2014.

== Major results ==
2002
1st Course du Raisin
2007
1st Stage 1b (TTT) Settimana Coppi e Bartali

== See also ==
- List of doping cases in cycling
