= Christian Werner (cyclist) =

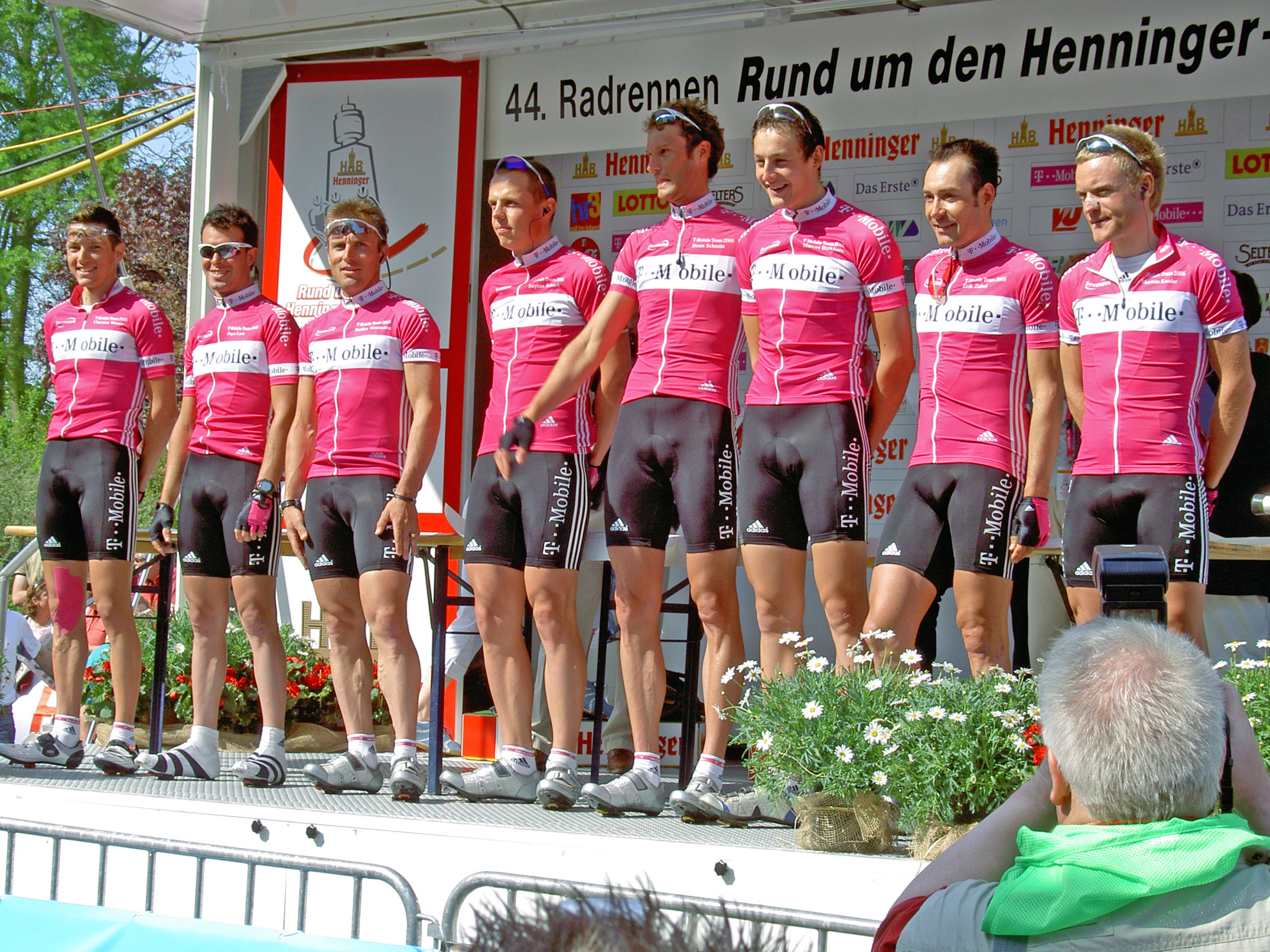
- Christian Werner with Team Mates

Personal information
- Born: 28 June 1979 (age 47) Bad Schwalbach, Germany

Cycling career
- Sport: Cycling
- Discipline: Road
- Role: Rider

Professional teams
- 2001–2002: Team Nürnberger
- 2003–2005: Team Telekom

Christian Werner (born 28 June 1979) is a former German cyclist.

He rode in the 2003 Vuelta a España and the 2005 Giro d'Italia.

== Major results ==
2002
3rd Rund um Köln
8th GP Triberg-Schwarzwald
2003
4th GP Triberg-Schwarzwald
2004
6th GP Triberg-Schwarzwald
7th Overall Tour of Austria
8th Overall Route du Sud
