= Rubén Lobato (cyclist) =

Spanish cyclist

Personal information
- Full name: Rubén Lobato Elvira
- Born: September 1, 1978 (age 48) San Sebastián de los Reyes, Spain
- Height: 1.73 m (5 ft 8 in)
- Weight: 64 kg (141 lb)

Cycling career
- Sport: Cycling
- Current team: Retired
- Discipline: Road
- Role: Rider

Amateur team
- 2001: Café Baqué

Professional teams
- 2001: Cantina Tollo–Acqua & Sapone (stagiaire)
- 2002: Acqua & Sapone–Cantina Tollo
- 2003: De Nardi–Colpack
- 2004–2008: Saunier Duval–Prodir

Rubén Lobato Elvira (born September 1, 1978, in San Sebastián de los Reyes, Madrid) is a Spanish former professional road bicycle racer who competed for Acqua & Sapone–Cantina Tollo (2002), Domina Vacanze-Elitron (2003) and Saunier Duval (2004–2008). On July 16, 2010, the UCI suspended him for 2 years, effective immediately, for irregularities in his BIO-passport, making him eligible for return July 16, 2012.

== Major results ==
2001
2nd Overall Circuito Montañés
8th Coppa Placci
2002
7th GP du canton d'Argovie
7th Subida al Naranco
2003
1st Memorial Manuel Galera
6th Subida al Naranco
7th Trofeo Melinda
2004
5th GP Lugano
2005
1st Mountains classification, Tour de Romandie
2nd Circuito de Getxo
8th GP Villafranca de Ordizia

=== Grand Tour general classification results timeline ===
Grand Tour	2002	2003	2004	2005	2006	2007
Giro d'Italia	—	—	16	43	87	—
Tour de France	—	—	—	—	45	DNF
Vuelta a España	123	—	—	—	—	38

Legend
—	Did not compete
DNF	Did not finish
