= Stephan Schreck =

German road cyclist (born 1978)

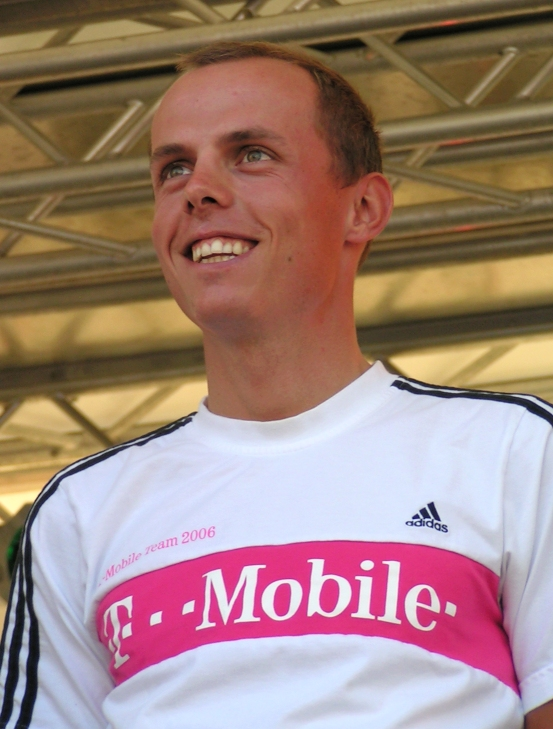
- Schreck in 2006

Personal information
- Full name: Stephan Schreck
- Born: 15 July 1978 (age 48) Erfurt, East Germany

Cycling career
- Sport: Cycling
- Current team: Retired
- Discipline: Road
- Role: Rider

Professional teams
- 2000–2007: Team Telekom
- 2008: Gerolsteiner

Managerial team
- 2011–2013: Thüringer Energie Team

Stephan Schreck (born 15 July 1978 in Erfurt) is a German former professional road cyclist who rode for Team Telekom and Gerolsteiner. He was unable to find a new team after Gerolsteiner folded and subsequently decided to retire.

== Career highlights ==
=== Major results ===
1996
1st Overall Tour de Lorraine
1st Overall Grand Prix Rüebliland
1999
1st Rund um den Henninger Turm U23
1st Thüringen Rundfahrt der U23
3rd Overall Triptyque des Monts et Châteaux
2001
9th Overall Sachsen-Tour
2002
1st Stage 5 Hessen Rundfahrt
2004
2nd Overall Regio-Tour

1st Stage 1

3rd Overall Niedersachsen-Rundfahrt
4th Overall Sachsen-Tour

1st Stage 1

2005
10th Rund um die Hainleite
2006
6th Overall Sachsen-Tour
9th Rund um Köln
2007
1st Stage 5 Sachsen-Tour
2008
6th Overall Sachsen-Tour

=== Grand Tour general classification results timeline ===
Grand Tour	2001	2002	2003	2004	2005	2006	2007	2008
Giro d'Italia	—	110	—	—	—	—	—	—
Tour de France	—	—	—	—	86	—	—	—
Vuelta a España	92	—	101	58	—	81	58	DNF

Legend
DSQ	Disqualified
DNF	Did not finish
