= André Korff =

German professional road bicycle racer (born 1973)

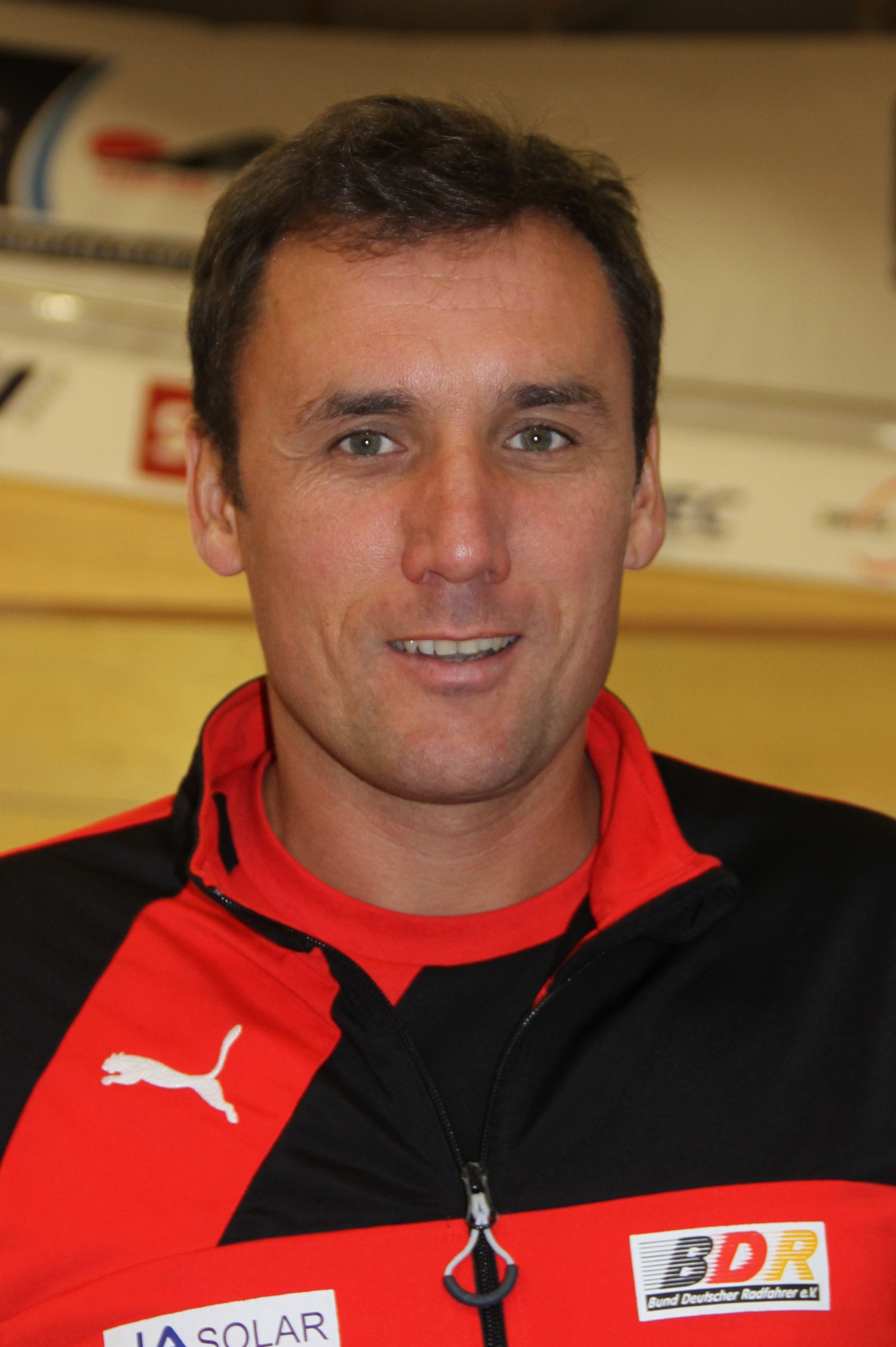
- Korff in 2015

Personal information
- Full name: André Korff
- Born: 16 June 1973 (age 53) Erfurt, East-Germany
- Height: 1.83 m (6 ft 0 in)
- Weight: 71 kg (157 lb)

Cycling career
- Sport: Cycling
- Discipline: Road
- Role: Rider
- Rider type: Sprinter

Professional teams
- 1997–2001: Festina
- 2002–2003: Team Coast
- 2003: Team Bianchi
- 2004–2007: T-Mobile Team

André Korff (born 16 June 1973) is a German professional road bicycle racer. Despite being a sprinter, he only managed to take two wins in his entire career.

He lives in Forchheim, Germany, with his wife and two children.

== Palmares ==
- Rheinland-Pfalz Rundfahrt - 1 stage (2004)
- GP Tell - 1 stage (1998)
