= Torsten Hiekmann =

German cyclist

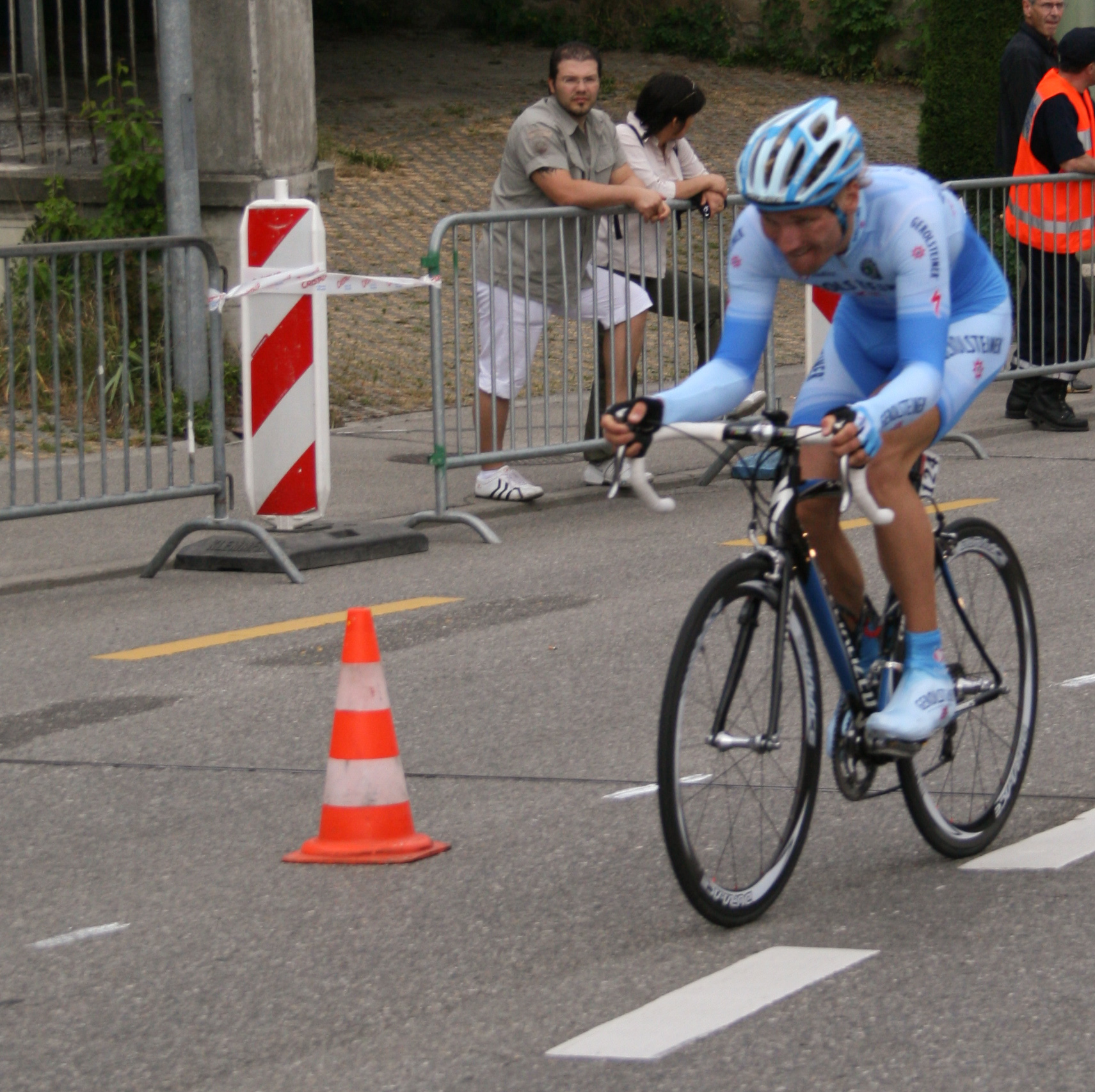

Personal information
- Full name: Torsten Hiekmann
- Born: March 17, 1980 (age 46) Berlin, Germany
- Height: 1.83 m (6 ft 0 in)
- Weight: 70 kg (150 lb)

Cycling career
- Sport: Cycling
- Current team: Retired
- Discipline: Road
- Role: Rider

Professional teams
- 2001–2005: T-Mobile Team
- 2006–2007: Gerolsteiner

Torsten Hiekmann (born March 17, 1980, in Berlin) is a former German professional road bicycle racer.

== Major results ==
1997
1st Time trial, UCI Junior Road World Championships
1999
1st Stage 2 Le Triptyque des Monts et Châteaux
2000
1st Rund um den Henninger Turm Under-23
4th Overall Peace Race
2002
3rd Overall Hessen Rundfahrt
3rd GP Triberg-Schwarzwald
2003
1st GP Triberg-Schwarzwald
2004
2nd Overall Tour de Luxembourg
3rd Overall Route du Sud
2005
2nd Overall Regio-Tour
2006
1st Stage 5 Regio-Tour

- 2nd, National U23 Road Race Championship (1999)
  - 2nd (1998)
- Germany U19 Cyclo-Cross Champion (1997)
- Germany U17 Cyclo-Cross Champion (1996)
