= Cyrille Monnerais =

French cyclist

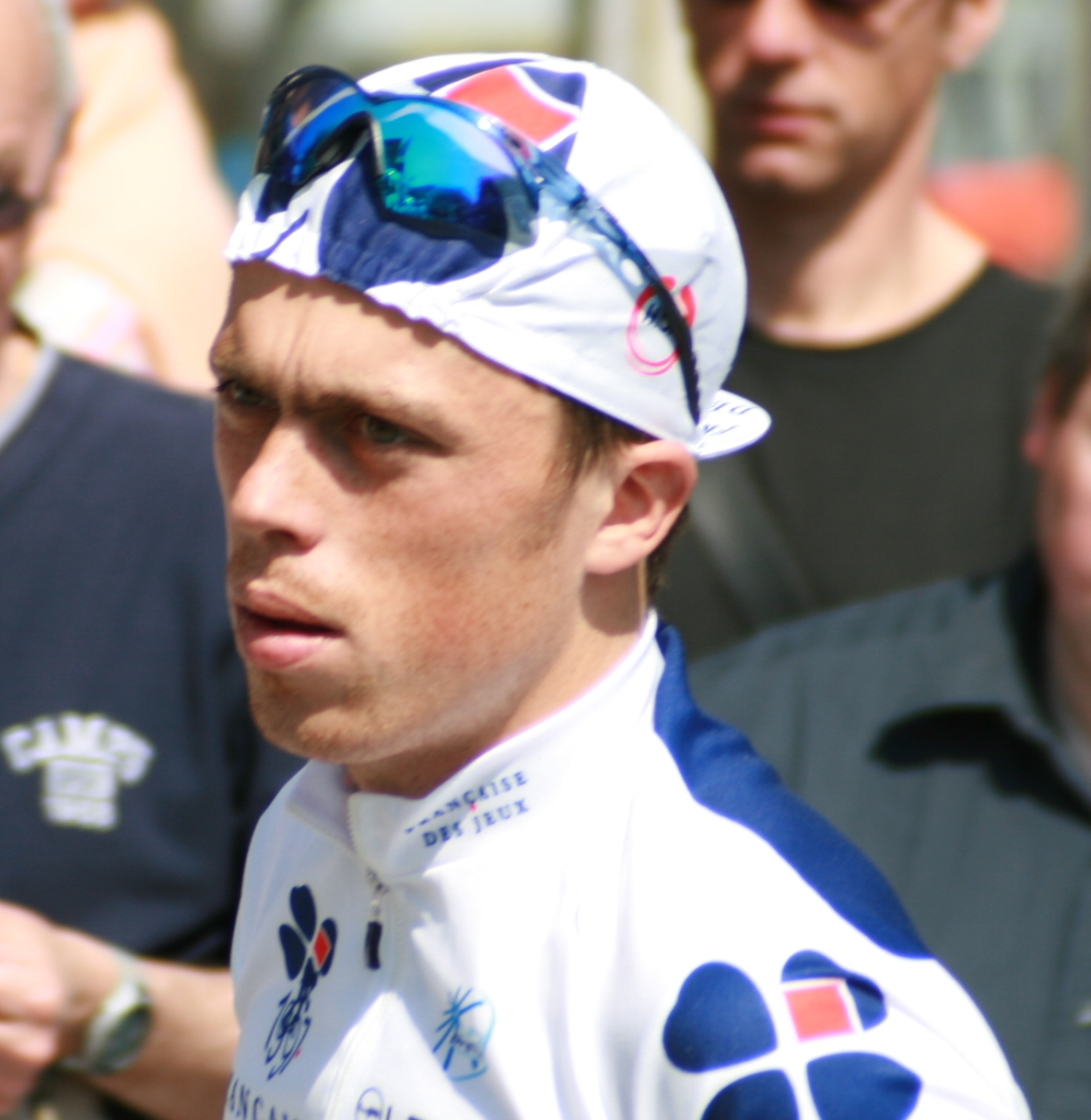

Personal information
- Full name: Cyrille Monnerais
- Born: 24 August 1983 (age 43) Malestroit, France
- Height: 1.75 m (5 ft 9 in)
- Weight: 70 kg (154 lb)

Cycling career
- Sport: Cycling
- Current team: Retired
- Discipline: Road
- Role: Rider

Professional teams
- 2005–2008: Française des Jeux
- 2009: Bretagne–Schuller

Cyrille Monnerais (born 24 August 1983 in Malestroit) is a French former professional road bicycle racer. He rode in three editions of the Giro d'Italia and the 2007 Vuelta a España.

== Major results ==
2004
1st Overall Kreiz Breizh Elites

1st Stage 1

5th Overall Ruban Granitier Breton

1st Young rider classification

2006
6th Overall Paris–Corrèze
