= Wim Van Huffel =

Belgian cyclist

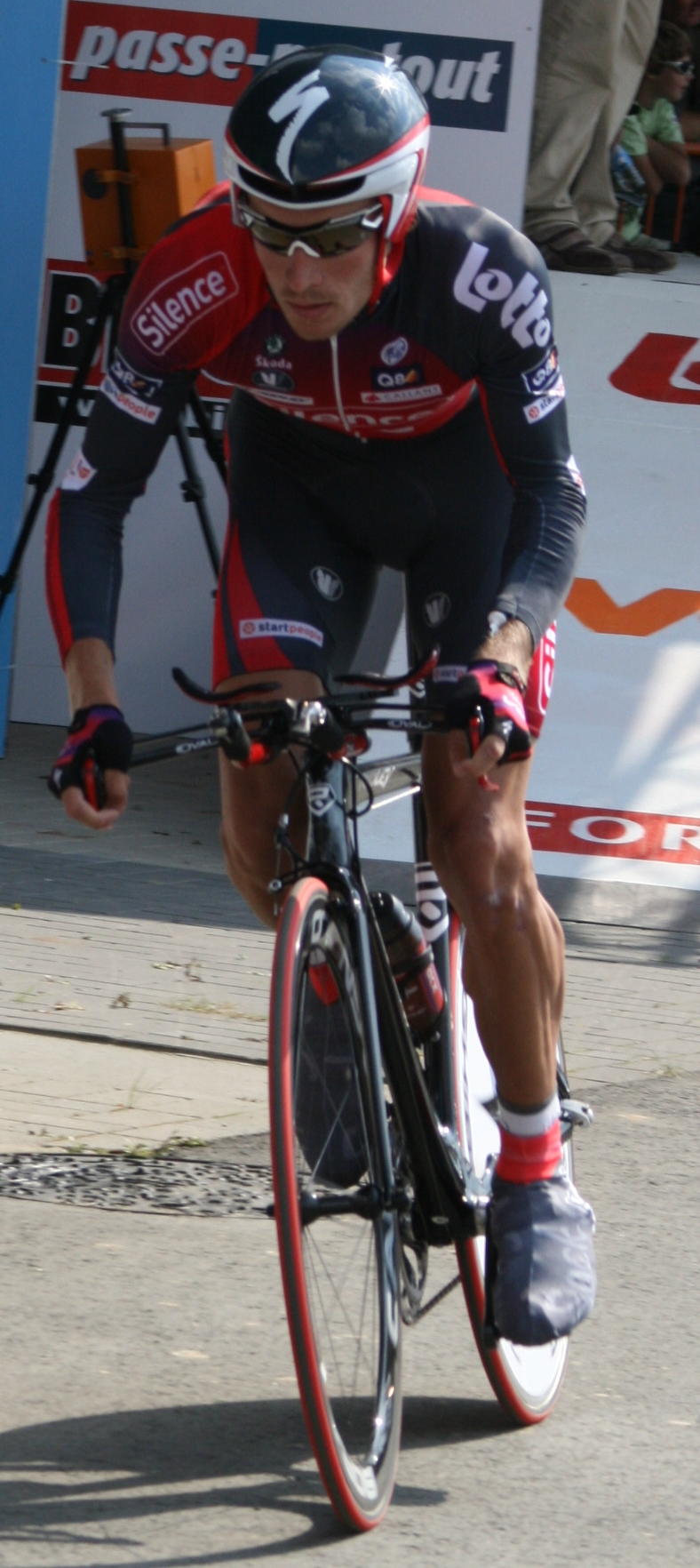

Personal information
- Full name: Wim Van Huffel
- Nickname: Snuffel
- Born: 28 May 1979 (age 47) Oudenaarde, Belgium
- Height: 1.82 m (6 ft 0 in)
- Weight: 66 kg (146 lb)

Cycling career
- Sport: Cycling
- Current team: Retired
- Discipline: Road
- Role: Rider

Amateur teams
- 2000: Flanders–Prefetex (stagiaire)
- 2001: Lotto–Adecco (stagiaire)

Professional teams
- 2002–2004: Vlaanderen–T Interim
- 2005–2008: Davitamon–Lotto
- 2009: Vorarlberg–Corratec
- 2010: Team Worldofbike.gr

Wim Van Huffel (born 28 May 1979 in Oudenaarde) is a Belgian former road bicycle racer, who competed professionally between 2002 and 2010.

== Top Results ==
- 11th GC Giro d'Italia ('05)
- 5th GC Tour de la region Wallonne ('05)
  - Hel van het Mergelland ('03)
- 17th GC Giro d'Italia ('06)
- 11th GC Deutschland Tour ('05)
- 4th De Brabantse Pijl - La Flèche Brabançonne ('05)
- 13th GC Tour of Germany ('06)
- 4th Stage Giro d'Italia ('05)
- 5th Druivenkoers - Overijse ('04)
- 5th Grand Prix de Wallonie ('06)

== Palmarès ==
- Hel van het Mergelland (2003)
