= Yannick Talabardon =

French cyclist

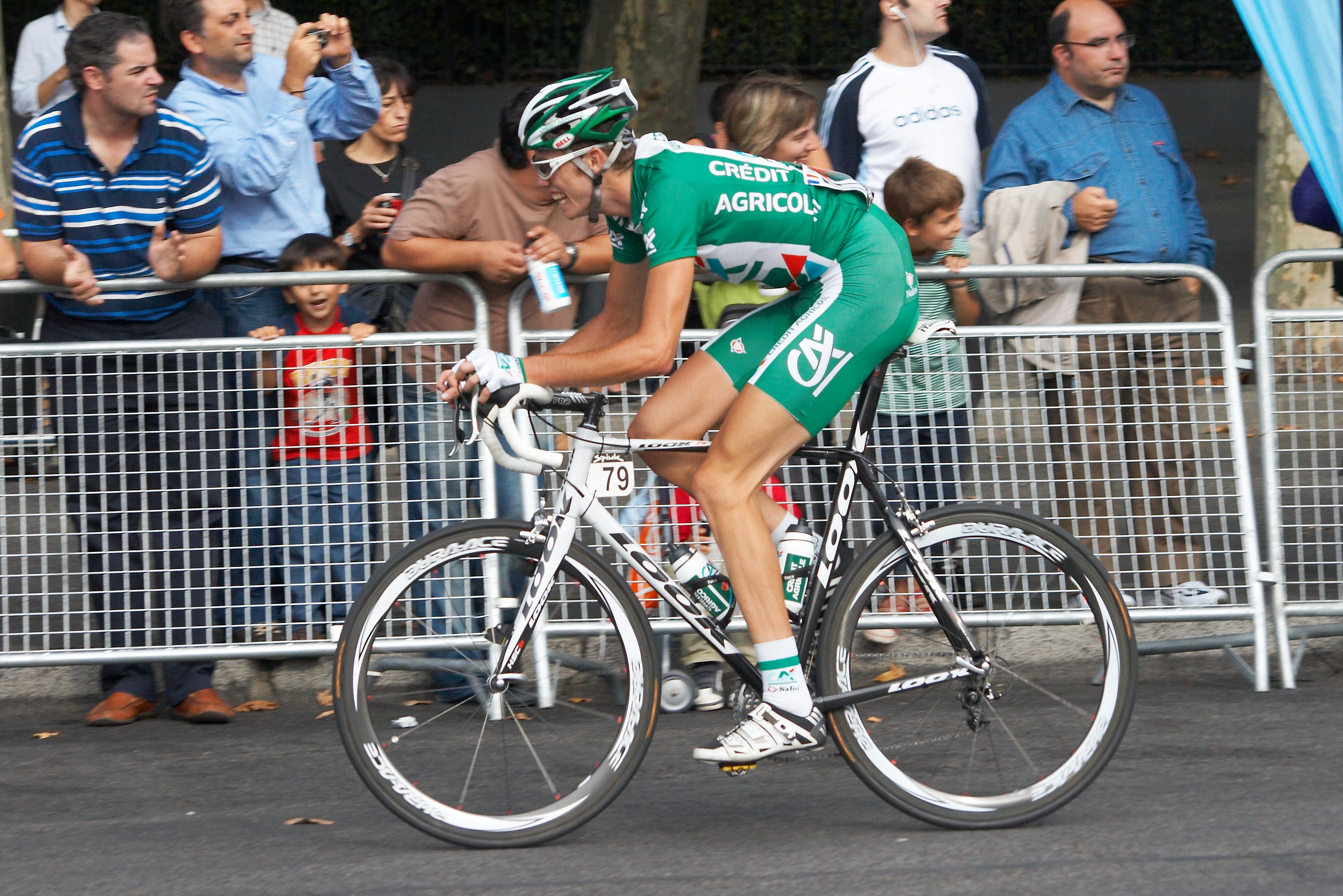

Personal information
- Full name: Yannick Talabardon
- Born: 6 July 1981 (age 45) Paris, France
- Height: 1.90 m (6 ft 3 in)
- Weight: 67 kg (148 lb)

Cycling career
- Sport: Cycling
- Discipline: Road
- Role: Rider
- Rider type: Classics Specialist/Climber

Professional teams
- 2002–2004: BigMat–Auber 93
- 2005–2008: Crédit Agricole
- 2009–2013: Besson Chaussures–Sojasun

Yannick Talabardon (born 6 July 1981 in Paris) is a French former professional road bicycle racer, who competed as a professional between 2002 and 2013. He won the Most Combative rider award for Stage 7 of the 2011 Tour de France for his role in the early breakaway.

Talabardon retired at the end of the 2013 season, after twelve seasons as a professional.

== Major results ==
2003
1st Prix du Léon
1st Mountains classification Tour de l'Avenir
2004
1st Prix des Blés d'Or
1st Tour de Jura
1st Stage 1 Tour de Normandie
8th Grand Prix d'Isbergues
10th Tour du Doubs
2007
9th Overall Tour Down Under
2008
6th Cholet-Pays de Loire
2009
1st Paris–Troyes
4th Overall Route du Sud
8th Overall Tour Méditerranéen
10th Overall Circuito Montañés
2010
4th Overall Tour du Gévaudan
5th Overall Tour Méditerranéen
2012
6th Overall Route du Sud
