= Scott Davis (cyclist) =

Australian cyclist (born 1979)

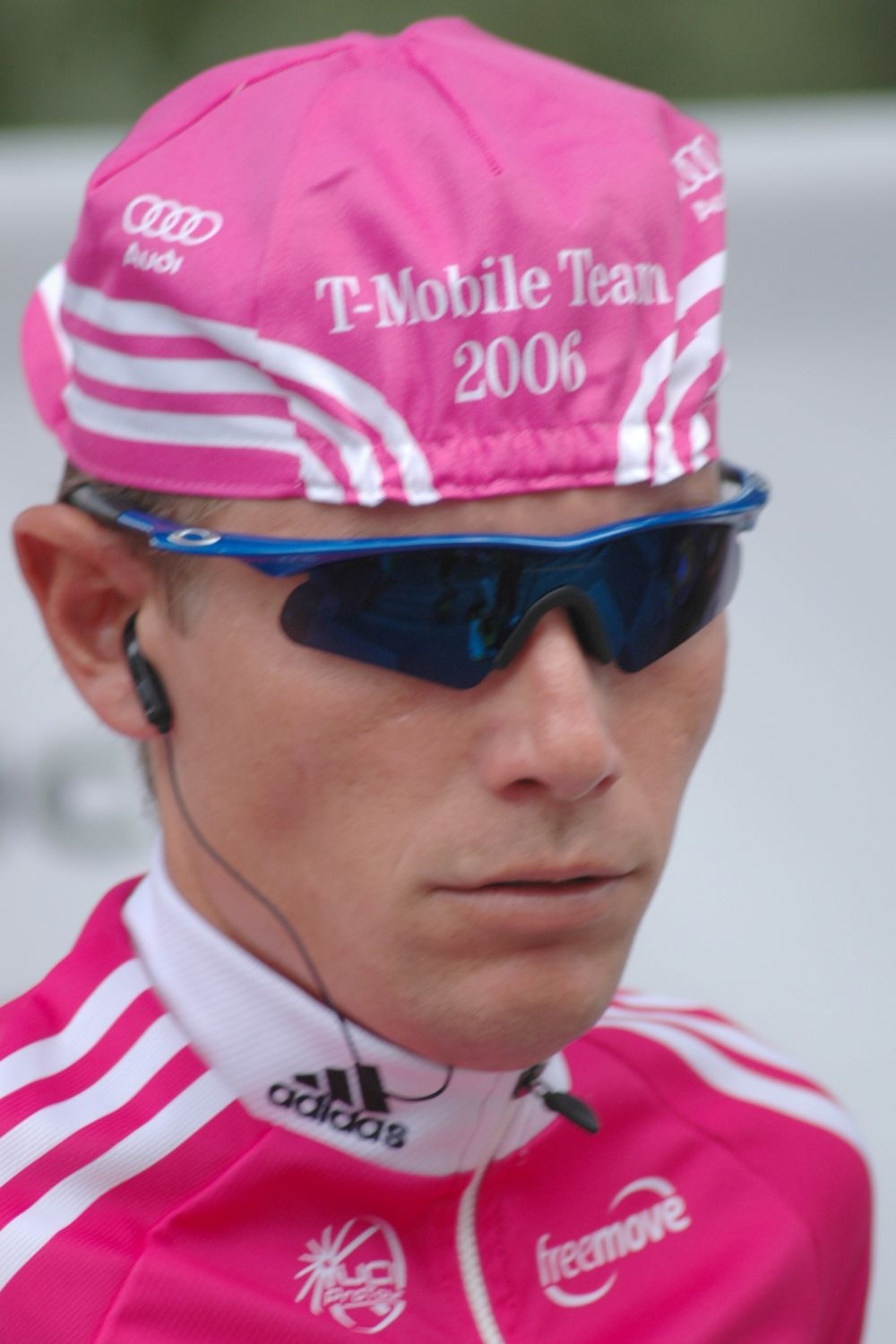

Personal information
- Full name: Scott Davis
- Born: 22 April 1979 (age 47) Bundaberg, Queensland, Australia
- Height: 1.70 m (5 ft 7 in)
- Weight: 60 kg (132 lb; 9 st 6 lb)

Cycling career
- Sport: Cycling
- Current team: Retired
- Discipline: Road
- Role: Rider
- Rider type: Climbing specialist

Professional teams
- 2003–2004: Ceramiche Panaria–Fiordo
- 2005: Tenax
- 2006–2008: T-Mobile Team
- 2009: Fly V Australia
- 2010: Astana

Scott Davis (born 22 April 1979) is a former Australian professional road bicycle racer, last for UCI Pro Tour Team Astana.

Born in Bundaberg, Queensland, he currently lives in Bundaberg, QLD.

He is the brother of fellow cyclist, Allan Davis.

== Major results ==
1997
1st World U-19 Team Pursuit Champion
1999
1st Stage 1 Tour of Tasmania
2001
3rd Overall Tour of Japan
2002
3rd Overall Baby Giro
2006
2nd Stage 1 Tour of California
2008
8th Neuseen Classics
2009
1st Stage 8 Tour of Gippsland
