= 2004 Vuelta a España, Stage 12 to Stage 21 =

Cycling race stages

The 2004 Vuelta a España was the 59th edition of the Vuelta a España, one of cycling's Grand Tours. The Vuelta began in León, with a team time trial on 4 September, and Stage 12 occurred on 16 September with a stage from Almería. The race finished in Madrid on 26 September.

== Stage 12 ==
16 September 2004 — Almería to Calar Alto Observatory, 145 km (90 mi)

Stage 12 result

Rank	Rider	Team	Time
1	Roberto Heras (ESP)	Liberty Seguros	4h 19' 30"
2	Santiago Pérez (ESP)	Phonak	+ 34"
3	Francisco Mancebo (ESP)	Illes Balears–Banesto	+ 53"
4	Alejandro Valverde (ESP)	Comunidad Valenciana–Kelme	+ 1' 27"
5	Isidro Nozal (ESP)	Liberty Seguros	s.t.
6	Ángel Gómez (ESP)	Costa de Almería–Paternina	+ 1' 38"
7	Luis Pérez (ESP)	Cofidis	s.t.
8	Stefano Garzelli (ITA)	Vini Caldirola–Nobili Rubinetterie	+ 2' 02"
9	Pedro Arreitunandía (ESP)	Cafés Baqué	+ 2' 17"
10	Carlos Sastre (ESP)	Team CSC	+ 2' 28"

General classification after stage 12

Rank	Rider	Team	Time
1	Roberto Heras (ESP)	Liberty Seguros	44h 50' 50"
2	Francisco Mancebo (ESP)	Illes Balears–Banesto	+ 35"
3	Alejandro Valverde (ESP)	Comunidad Valenciana–Kelme	+ 49"
4	Isidro Nozal (ESP)	Liberty Seguros	+ 1' 12"
5	Floyd Landis (USA)	U.S. Postal Service	+ 2' 19"
6	Manuel Beltrán (ESP)	U.S. Postal Service	+ 2' 40"
7	Carlos Sastre (ESP)	Team CSC	+ 3' 16"
8	Santiago Pérez (ESP)	Phonak	+ 4' 22"
9	Ángel Gómez (ESP)	Costa de Almería–Paternina	+ 5' 07"
10	David Blanco (ESP)	Comunidad Valenciana–Kelme	+ 6' 12"

== Stage 13 ==
17 September 2004 — El Ejido to Málaga, 172 km (107 mi)

Stage 13 result

Rank	Rider	Team	Time
1	Alessandro Petacchi (ITA)	Fassa Bortolo	4h 01' 55"
2	Erik Zabel (GER)	T-Mobile Team	s.t.
3	Pedro Horrillo (ESP)	Quick-Step–Davitamon	s.t.
4	Stuart O'Grady (AUS)	Cofidis	s.t.
5	Cristian Moreni (ITA)	Alessio–Bianchi	s.t.
6	Erki Pütsep (EST)	AG2R Prévoyance	s.t.
7	Eddy Mazzoleni (ITA)	Saeco	s.t.
8	Guido Trenti (USA)	Fassa Bortolo	s.t.
9	Marco Zanotti (ITA)	Vini Caldirola–Nobili Rubinetterie	s.t.
10	Antonio Cruz (USA)	U.S. Postal Service	s.t.

General classification after stage 13

Rank	Rider	Team	Time
1	Roberto Heras (ESP)	Liberty Seguros	48h 52' 45"
2	Francisco Mancebo (ESP)	Illes Balears–Banesto	+ 35"
3	Alejandro Valverde (ESP)	Comunidad Valenciana–Kelme	+ 49"
4	Isidro Nozal (ESP)	Liberty Seguros	+ 1' 12"
5	Floyd Landis (USA)	U.S. Postal Service	+ 2' 19"
6	Manuel Beltrán (ESP)	U.S. Postal Service	+ 2' 40"
7	Carlos Sastre (ESP)	Team CSC	+ 3' 16"
8	Santiago Pérez (ESP)	Phonak	+ 4' 22"
9	Ángel Gómez (ESP)	Costa de Almería–Paternina	+ 5' 07"
10	David Blanco (ESP)	Comunidad Valenciana–Kelme	+ 6' 12"

== Stage 14 ==
18 September 2004 — Málaga to Granada, 167 km (104 mi)

Stage 14 result

Rank	Rider	Team	Time
1	Santiago Pérez (ESP)	Phonak	4' 06' 34"
2	Alejandro Valverde (ESP)	Comunidad Valenciana–Kelme	+ 46"
3	Luis Pérez (ESP)	Cofidis	s.t.
4	Francisco Mancebo (ESP)	Illes Balears–Banesto	s.t.
5	Isidro Nozal (ESP)	Liberty Seguros	s.t.
6	Carlos Sastre (ESP)	Team CSC	s.t.
7	Roberto Heras (ESP)	Liberty Seguros	s.t.
8	Leonardo Piepoli (ITA)	Saunier Duval–Prodir	s.t.
9	Carlos García Quesada (ESP)	Comunidad Valenciana–Kelme	s.t.
10	David Blanco (ESP)	Comunidad Valenciana–Kelme	+ 2' 08"

General classification after stage 14

Rank	Rider	Team	Time
1	Roberto Heras (ESP)	Liberty Seguros	53h 00' 05"
2	Francisco Mancebo (ESP)	Illes Balears–Banesto	+ 35"
3	Alejandro Valverde (ESP)	Comunidad Valenciana–Kelme	+ 49"
4	Isidro Nozal (ESP)	Liberty Seguros	+ 1' 12"
5	Carlos Sastre (ESP)	Team CSC	+ 3' 16"
6	Santiago Pérez (ESP)	Phonak	+ 3' 36"
7	Floyd Landis (USA)	U.S. Postal Service	+ 4' 19"
8	Manuel Beltrán (ESP)	U.S. Postal Service	+ 4' 40"
9	Ángel Gómez (ESP)	Costa de Almería–Paternina	+ 6' 43"
10	Carlos García Quesada (ESP)	Comunidad Valenciana–Kelme	+ 7' 26"

== Stage 15 ==
19 September 2004 — Granada to Sierra Nevada, 29.6 km (18.4 mi) (ITT)

Stage 15 result

Rank	Rider	Team	Time
1	Santiago Pérez (ESP)	Phonak	1' 02' 29"
2	Alejandro Valverde (ESP)	Comunidad Valenciana–Kelme	+ 1' 07"
3	Roberto Heras (ESP)	Liberty Seguros	+ 1' 51"
4	Alexander Vinokourov (KAZ)	T-Mobile Team	+ 3' 06"
5	Francisco Mancebo (ESP)	Illes Balears–Banesto	+ 3' 18"
6	Carlos García Quesada (ESP)	Comunidad Valenciana–Kelme	+ 3' 24"
7	Ángel Gómez (ESP)	Costa de Almería–Paternina	+ 3' 59"
8	David Blanco (ESP)	Comunidad Valenciana–Kelme	+ 4' 00"
9	Isidro Nozal (ESP)	Liberty Seguros	+ 4' 24"
10	Javier Pascual Rodríguez (ESP)	Comunidad Valenciana–Kelme	+ 4' 28"

General classification after stage 15

Rank	Rider	Team	Time
1	Roberto Heras (ESP)	Liberty Seguros	54h 04' 25"
2	Alejandro Valverde (ESP)	Comunidad Valenciana–Kelme	+ 5"
3	Santiago Pérez (ESP)	Phonak	+ 1' 45"
4	Francisco Mancebo (ESP)	Illes Balears–Banesto	+ 2' 02"
5	Isidro Nozal (ESP)	Liberty Seguros	+ 3' 45"
6	Carlos Sastre (ESP)	Team CSC	+ 6' 12"
7	Floyd Landis (USA)	U.S. Postal Service	+ 8' 21"
8	Manuel Beltrán (ESP)	U.S. Postal Service	+ 8' 44"
9	Ángel Gómez (ESP)	Costa de Almería–Paternina	+ 8' 51"
10	Carlos García Quesada (ESP)	Comunidad Valenciana–Kelme	+ 8' 59"

== Stage 16 ==
21 September 2004 — Olivenza to Cáceres, 190.1 km (118.1 mi)

Stage 16 result

Rank	Rider	Team	Time
1	José Julia (ESP)	Comunidad Valenciana–Kelme	4h 19' 23"
2	Tadej Valjavec (SLO)	Phonak	+ 12"
3	Danilo Di Luca (ITA)	Saeco	+ 35"
4	Antonio Cruz (USA)	U.S. Postal Service	s.t.
5	Pablo Lastras (ESP)	Illes Balears–Banesto	s.t.
6	Iñaki Isasi (ESP)	Euskaltel–Euskadi	s.t.
7	Iván Parra (COL)	Cafés Baqué	+ 1' 20"
8	Alessandro Spezialetti (ITA)	Saeco	+ 1' 25"
9	Erki Pütsep (EST)	AG2R Prévoyance	+ 1' 33"
10	Cristian Moreni (ITA)	Alessio–Bianchi	s.t.

General classification after stage 16

Rank	Rider	Team	Time
1	Roberto Heras (ESP)	Liberty Seguros	58h 35' 32"
2	Alejandro Valverde (ESP)	Comunidad Valenciana–Kelme	+ 5"
3	Santiago Pérez (ESP)	Phonak	+ 1' 45"
4	Francisco Mancebo (ESP)	Illes Balears–Banesto	+ 2' 02"
5	Isidro Nozal (ESP)	Liberty Seguros	+ 3' 45"
6	Carlos Sastre (ESP)	Team CSC	+ 6' 12"
7	Floyd Landis (USA)	U.S. Postal Service	+ 8' 30"
8	Manuel Beltrán (ESP)	U.S. Postal Service	+ 8' 44"
9	Ángel Gómez (ESP)	Costa de Almería–Paternina	+ 8' 51"
10	Carlos García Quesada (ESP)	Comunidad Valenciana–Kelme	+ 8' 59"

== Stage 17 ==
22 September 2004 — Plasencia to La Covatilla, 170 km (110 mi)

Stage 17 result

Rank	Rider	Team	Time
1	Félix Cárdenas (COL)	Cafés Baqué	4h 52' 08"
2	Santiago Pérez (ESP)	Phonak	+ 29"
3	Roberto Heras (ESP)	Liberty Seguros	+ 1' 01"
4	Francisco Mancebo (ESP)	Illes Balears–Banesto	+ 1' 15"
5	Luis Pérez (ESP)	Cofidis	+ 2' 05"
6	Ángel Gómez (ESP)	Costa de Almería–Paternina	+ 2' 18"
7	Jorge Ferrio (ESP)	Costa de Almería–Paternina	s.t.
8	Francisco José Lara (ESP)	Costa de Almería–Paternina	s.t.
9	Carlos Sastre (ESP)	Team CSC	+ 2' 45"
10	M.A. Martín Perdiguero (ESP)	Saunier Duval–Prodir	+ 3' 03"

General classification after stage 17

Rank	Rider	Team	Time
1	Roberto Heras (ESP)	Liberty Seguros	63h 28' 41"
2	Santiago Pérez (ESP)	Phonak	+ 1' 13"
3	Alejandro Valverde (ESP)	Comunidad Valenciana–Kelme	+ 2' 15"
4	Francisco Mancebo (ESP)	Illes Balears–Banesto	+ 2' 16"
5	Isidro Nozal (ESP)	Liberty Seguros	+ 5' 55"
6	Carlos Sastre (ESP)	Team CSC	+ 7' 56"
7	Ángel Gómez (ESP)	Costa de Almería–Paternina	+ 10' 08"
8	Carlos García Quesada (ESP)	Comunidad Valenciana–Kelme	+ 11' 09"
9	Manuel Beltrán (ESP)	U.S. Postal Service	+ 11' 51"
10	Luis Pérez (ESP)	Cofidis	+ 12' 25"

== Stage 18 ==
23 September 2004 — Béjar to Ávila, 196 km (122 mi)

Stage 18 result

Rank	Rider	Team	Time
1	Javier Pascual Rodríguez (ESP)	Comunidad Valenciana–Kelme	5h 02' 59"
2	Iván Parra (COL)	Cafés Baqué	s.t.
3	Joan Horrach (ESP)	Illes Balears–Banesto	+ 19"
4	Hernán Buenahora (COL)	Cafés Baqué	s.t.
5	Patrick Calcagni (SUI)	Vini Caldirola–Nobili Rubinetterie	+ 24"
6	Cédric Vasseur (FRA)	Cofidis	+ 35"
7	Bram Tankink (NED)	Quick-Step–Davitamon	+ 37"
8	Alejandro Valverde (ESP)	Comunidad Valenciana–Kelme	+ 1' 24"
9	Francisco Mancebo (ESP)	Illes Balears–Banesto	s.t.
10	Stefano Garzelli (ITA)	Vini Caldirola–Nobili Rubinetterie	s.t.

General classification after stage 18

Rank	Rider	Team	Time
1	Roberto Heras (ESP)	Liberty Seguros	68h 33' 04"
2	Santiago Pérez (ESP)	Phonak	+ 1' 13"
3	Alejandro Valverde (ESP)	Comunidad Valenciana–Kelme	+ 2' 15"
4	Francisco Mancebo (ESP)	Illes Balears–Banesto	+ 2' 16"
5	Isidro Nozal (ESP)	Liberty Seguros	+ 6' 08"
6	Carlos Sastre (ESP)	Team CSC	+ 7' 56"
7	Ángel Gómez (ESP)	Costa de Almería–Paternina	+ 10' 21"
8	Carlos García Quesada (ESP)	Comunidad Valenciana–Kelme	+ 11' 18"
9	Luis Pérez (ESP)	Cofidis	+ 12' 25"
10	Manuel Beltrán (ESP)	U.S. Postal Service	+ 12' 56"

== Stage 19 ==
24 September 2004 — Ávila to Collado Villalba, 142 km (88 mi)

Stage 19 result

Rank	Rider	Team	Time
1	Constantino Zaballa (ESP)	Saunier Duval–Prodir	3h 33' 32"
2	Ruslan Ivanov (MDA)	Alessio–Bianchi	+ 1' 23"
3	Damiano Cunego (ITA)	Saeco	s.t.
4	José Luis Arrieta (ESP)	Illes Balears–Banesto	s.t.
5	Eddy Mazzoleni (ITA)	Saeco	s.t.
6	Juan Manuel Gárate (ESP)	Lampre	s.t.
7	Félix Cárdenas (COL)	Cafés Baqué	s.t.
8	Stefano Garzelli (ITA)	Vini Caldirola–Nobili Rubinetterie	s.t.
9	Benoît Joachim (LUX)	U.S. Postal Service	s.t.
10	Dario Cioni (ITA)	Fassa Bortolo	s.t.

General classification after stage 19

Rank	Rider	Team	Time
1	Roberto Heras (ESP)	Liberty Seguros	72h 13' 01"
2	Santiago Pérez (ESP)	Phonak	+ 1' 13"
3	Alejandro Valverde (ESP)	Comunidad Valenciana–Kelme	+ 2' 15"
4	Francisco Mancebo (ESP)	Illes Balears–Banesto	+ 2' 16"
5	Isidro Nozal (ESP)	Liberty Seguros	+ 6' 08"
6	Carlos García Quesada (ESP)	Comunidad Valenciana–Kelme	+ 6' 16"
7	Carlos Sastre (ESP)	Team CSC	+ 7' 56"
8	Ángel Gómez (ESP)	Costa de Almería–Paternina	+ 10' 21"
9	Stefano Garzelli (ITA)	Vini Caldirola–Nobili Rubinetterie	+ 12' 21"
10	Luis Pérez (ESP)	Cofidis	+ 12' 25"

== Stage 20 ==
25 September 2004 — Alcobendas to Puerto de Navacerrada, 178 km (111 mi)

Stage 20 result

Rank	Rider	Team	Time
1	José Enrique Gutiérrez (ESP)	Phonak	4h 52' 20"
2	Eladio Jiménez (ESP)	Comunidad Valenciana–Kelme	+ 38"
3	David Latasa (ESP)	Comunidad Valenciana–Kelme	+ 1' 25"
4	Santiago Pérez (ESP)	Phonak	+ 1' 37"
5	Aitor Pérez (ESP)	Cafés Baqué	+ 2' 03"
6	Roberto Heras (ESP)	Liberty Seguros	+ 2' 07"
7	Cédric Vasseur (FRA)	Cofidis	s.t.
8	Francisco Mancebo (ESP)	Illes Balears–Banesto	+ 2' 10"
9	Jorge Ferrio (ESP)	Costa de Almería–Paternina	+ 2' 18"
10	Alejandro Valverde (ESP)	Comunidad Valenciana–Kelme	s.t.

General classification after stage 20

Rank	Rider	Team	Time
1	Roberto Heras (ESP)	Liberty Seguros	77h 07' 28"
2	Santiago Pérez (ESP)	Phonak	+ 43"
3	Francisco Mancebo (ESP)	Illes Balears–Banesto	+ 2' 19"
4	Alejandro Valverde (ESP)	Comunidad Valenciana–Kelme	+ 2' 26"
5	Carlos García Quesada (ESP)	Comunidad Valenciana–Kelme	+ 6' 33"
6	Isidro Nozal (ESP)	Liberty Seguros	+ 7' 16"
7	Carlos Sastre (ESP)	Team CSC	+ 8' 16"
8	Ángel Gómez (ESP)	Costa de Almería–Paternina	+ 12' 11"
9	Luis Pérez (ESP)	Cofidis	+ 12' 45"
10	Stefano Garzelli (ITA)	Vini Caldirola–Nobili Rubinetterie	+ 14' 35"

== Stage 21 ==
26 September 2004 — Madrid to Madrid, 28 km (17 mi) (ITT)

Stage 21 result

Rank	Rider	Team	Time
1	Santiago Pérez (ESP)	Phonak	35' 05"
2	Francisco Mancebo (ESP)	Illes Balears–Banesto	+ 7"
3	Carlos Sastre (ESP)	Team CSC	+ 8"
4	Roberto Heras (ESP)	Liberty Seguros	+ 13"
5	David Blanco (ESP)	Comunidad Valenciana–Kelme	+ 18"
6	Bert Grabsch (GER)	Phonak	+ 34"
7	Víctor Hugo Peña (COL)	U.S. Postal Service	+ 36"
8	Luis Pérez (ESP)	Cofidis	+ 52"
9	Vladimir Gusev (RUS)	Team CSC	+ 55"
10	Jörg Jaksche (GER)	Team CSC	+ 58"

General classification after stage 21

Rank	Rider	Team	Time
1	Roberto Heras (ESP)	Liberty Seguros	77h 42' 46"
2	Santiago Pérez (ESP)	Phonak	+ 30"
3	Francisco Mancebo (ESP)	Illes Balears–Banesto	+ 2' 13"
4	Alejandro Valverde (ESP)	Comunidad Valenciana–Kelme	+ 3' 30"
5	Carlos García Quesada (ESP)	Comunidad Valenciana–Kelme	+ 7' 44"
6	Carlos Sastre (ESP)	Team CSC	+ 8' 11"
7	Isidro Nozal (ESP)	Liberty Seguros	+ 8' 32"
8	Ángel Gómez (ESP)	Costa de Almería–Paternina	+ 13' 08"
9	Luis Pérez (ESP)	Cofidis	+ 13' 24"
10	David Blanco (ESP)	Comunidad Valenciana–Kelme	+ 15' 15"
