= 2004 Vuelta a España, Stage 1 to Stage 11 =

Cycling race stages

The 2004 Vuelta a España was the 59th edition of the Vuelta a España, one of cycling's Grand Tours. The Vuelta began in León, with a team time trial on 4 September, and Stage 11 occurred on 14 September with a stage to Caravaca de la Cruz. The race finished in Madrid on 26 September.

== Stage 1 ==
4 September 2005 — León to León, 28 km (17 mi) (TTT)

Stage 1 result

Rank	Team	Time
1	U.S. Postal Service	30' 45"
2	T-Mobile Team	+ 31"
3	Illes Balears–Banesto	+ 56"
4	Comunidad Valenciana–Kelme	+ 58"
5	Phonak	+ 1' 01"
6	Team CSC	+ 1' 24"
7	Fassa Bortolo	+ 1' 25"
8	Liberty Seguros	+ 1' 28"
9	Saeco	+ 1' 38"
10	Relax–Bodysol	+ 1' 41"

General classification after stage 1

Rank	Rider	Team	Time
1	Floyd Landis (USA)	U.S. Postal Service	30' 45"
2	Michael Barry (CAN)	U.S. Postal Service	s.t.
3	Víctor Hugo Peña (COL)	U.S. Postal Service	s.t.
4	Manuel Beltrán (ESP)	U.S. Postal Service	s.t.
5	David Zabriskie (USA)	U.S. Postal Service	s.t.
6	Benoît Joachim (LUX)	U.S. Postal Service	s.t.
7	Max van Heeswijk (NED)	U.S. Postal Service	s.t.
8	Erik Zabel (GER)	T-Mobile Team	+ 31"
9	Alexander Vinokourov (KAZ)	T-Mobile Team	s.t.
10	Tomáš Konečný (CZE)	T-Mobile Team	s.t.

== Stage 2 ==
5 September 2004 — León to Burgos, 207 km (129 mi)

Stage 2 result

Rank	Rider	Team	Time
1	Alessandro Petacchi (ITA)	Fassa Bortolo	5h 02' 05"
2	Erik Zabel (GER)	T-Mobile Team	s.t.
3	Óscar Freire (ESP)	Rabobank	s.t.
4	Stuart O'Grady (AUS)	Cofidis	s.t.
5	Pedro Horrillo (ESP)	Quick-Step–Davitamon	s.t.
6	Giosuè Bonomi (ESP)	Saeco	s.t.
7	Antonio Cruz (USA)	U.S. Postal Service	s.t.
8	Marco Zanotti (ITA)	Vini Caldirola–Nobili Rubinetterie	s.t.
9	Erki Pütsep (EST)	AG2R Prévoyance	s.t.
10	Iñaki Isasi (ESP)	Euskaltel–Euskadi	s.t.

General classification after stage 2

Rank	Rider	Team	Time
1	Max van Heeswijk (NED)	U.S. Postal Service	5h 32' 44"
2	Benoît Joachim (LUX)	U.S. Postal Service	+ 2"
3	Floyd Landis (USA)	U.S. Postal Service	+ 6"
4	Michael Barry (CAN)	U.S. Postal Service	s.t.
5	Manuel Beltrán (ESP)	U.S. Postal Service	s.t.
6	Víctor Hugo Peña (COL)	U.S. Postal Service	s.t.
7	David Zabriskie (USA)	U.S. Postal Service	s.t.
8	Erik Zabel (GER)	T-Mobile Team	+ 25"
9	Tomáš Konečný (CZE)	T-Mobile Team	+ 37"
10	Santiago Botero (COL)	T-Mobile Team	s.t.

== Stage 3 ==
6 September 2004 — Burgos to Soria, 156 km (97 mi)

Stage 3 result

Rank	Rider	Team	Time
1	Alejandro Valverde (ESP)	Comunidad Valenciana–Kelme	3h 43' 17"
2	Stuart O'Grady (AUS)	Cofidis	s.t.
3	Denis Menchov (RUS)	Illes Balears–Banesto	s.t.
4	Óscar Freire (ESP)	Rabobank	s.t.
5	Roberto Heras (ESP)	Liberty Seguros	s.t.
6	Stefano Garzelli (ITA)	Vini Caldirola–Nobili Rubinetterie	s.t.
7	Francisco Mancebo (ESP)	Illes Balears–Banesto	s.t.
8	Aitor González (ESP)	Fassa Bortolo	s.t.
9	Damiano Cunego (ITA)	Saeco	s.t.
10	Iñaki Isasi (ESP)	T-Mobile Team	s.t.

General classification after stage 3

Rank	Rider	Team	Time
1	Benoît Joachim (LUX)	U.S. Postal Service	9h 16' 00"
2	Max van Heeswijk (NED)	U.S. Postal Service	+ 16"
3	Floyd Landis (USA)	U.S. Postal Service	+ 22"
4	Michael Barry (CAN)	U.S. Postal Service	s.t.
5	Manuel Beltrán (ESP)	U.S. Postal Service	s.t.
6	Víctor Hugo Peña (COL)	U.S. Postal Service	s.t.
7	David Zabriskie (USA)	U.S. Postal Service	s.t.
8	Alexander Vinokourov (KAZ)	T-Mobile Team	+ 38"
9	Cadel Evans (AUS)	T-Mobile Team	s.t.
10	Alejandro Valverde (ESP)	Comunidad Valenciana–Kelme	+ 45"

== Stage 4 ==
7 September 2004 — Soria to Zaragoza, 167 km (104 mi)

Stage 4 result

Rank	Rider	Team	Time
1	Alessandro Petacchi (ITA)	Fassa Bortolo	4h 23' 01"
2	Erik Zabel (GER)	T-Mobile Team	s.t.
3	Óscar Freire (ESP)	Rabobank	s.t.
4	Stuart O'Grady (AUS)	Cofidis	s.t.
5	Angelo Furlan (ITA)	Alessio–Bianchi	s.t.
6	Giosuè Bonomi (ESP)	Saeco	s.t.
7	Miguel Ángel Martín Perdiguero (ESP)	Saunier Duval–Prodir	s.t.
8	Pedro Horrillo (ESP)	Quick-Step–Davitamon	s.t.
9	Arnaud Coyot (FRA)	Cofidis	s.t.
10	Luca Paolini (ITA)	Quick-Step–Davitamon	s.t.

General classification after stage 4

Rank	Rider	Team	Time
1	Benoît Joachim (LUX)	U.S. Postal Service	13h 38' 59"
2	Max van Heeswijk (NED)	U.S. Postal Service	+ 18"
3	Manuel Beltrán (ESP)	U.S. Postal Service	+ 24"
4	Michael Barry (CAN)	U.S. Postal Service	s.t.
5	Floyd Landis (USA)	U.S. Postal Service	s.t.
6	Víctor Hugo Peña (COL)	U.S. Postal Service	s.t.
7	David Zabriskie (USA)	U.S. Postal Service	s.t.
8	Alexander Vinokourov (KAZ)	T-Mobile Team	+ 40"
9	Cadel Evans (AUS)	T-Mobile Team	s.t.
10	Alejandro Valverde (ESP)	Comunidad Valenciana–Kelme	+ 47"

== Stage 5 ==
8 September 2004 — Zaragoza to Morella, 186.5 km (115.9 mi)

Stage 5 result

Rank	Rider	Team	Time
1	Denis Menchov (RUS)	Illes Balears–Banesto	5h 07' 44"
2	Aitor González (ESP)	Fassa Bortolo	+ 3"
3	Alejandro Valverde (ESP)	Comunidad Valenciana–Kelme	s.t.
4	Leonardo Piepoli (ITA)	Saunier Duval–Prodir	s.t.
5	Carlos Sastre (ESP)	Team CSC	s.t.
6	Cadel Evans (AUS)	T-Mobile Team	+ 9"
7	Francisco Mancebo (ESP)	Illes Balears–Banesto	s.t.
8	Isidro Nozal (ESP)	Liberty Seguros	s.t.
9	Manuel Beltrán (ESP)	U.S. Postal Service	s.t.
10	Ángel Gómez (ESP)	Costa de Almería–Paternina	s.t.

General classification after stage 5

Rank	Rider	Team	Time
1	Manuel Beltrán (ESP)	U.S. Postal Service	18h 47' 16"
2	Floyd Landis (USA)	U.S. Postal Service	s.t.
3	Denis Menchov (RUS)	Illes Balears–Banesto	+ 4"
4	Alejandro Valverde (ESP)	Comunidad Valenciana–Kelme	+ 9"
5	Cadel Evans (AUS)	T-Mobile Team	+ 16"
6	Benoît Joachim (LUX)	U.S. Postal Service	+ 23"
7	Francisco Mancebo (ESP)	Illes Balears–Banesto	+ 39"
8	Carlos García Quesada (ESP)	Comunidad Valenciana–Kelme	+ 47"
9	Víctor Hugo Peña (COL)	U.S. Postal Service	s.t.
10	Tyler Hamilton (USA)	Phonak	+ 50"

== Stage 6 ==
9 September 2004 — Benicarló to Castellón de la Plana, 157 km (98 mi)

Stage 6 result

Rank	Rider	Team	Time
1	Óscar Freire (ESP)	Rabobank	3h 48' 23"
2	Erik Zabel (GER)	T-Mobile Team	s.t.
3	Stuart O'Grady (AUS)	Cofidis	s.t.
4	Cristian Moreni (ITA)	Alessio–Bianchi	s.t.
5	Miguel Ángel Martín Perdiguero (ESP)	Saunier Duval–Prodir	s.t.
6	David Fernández (ESP)	Costa de Almería–Paternina	+ 9"
7	Stefano Garzelli (ITA)	Vini Caldirola–Nobili Rubinetterie	s.t.
8	Alejandro Valverde (ESP)	Comunidad Valenciana–Kelme	s.t.
9	Juan Manuel Gárate (ESP)	Lampre	s.t.
10	Luis Pasamontes (ESP)	Relax–Bodysol	s.t.

General classification after stage 6

Rank	Rider	Team	Time
1	Manuel Beltrán (ESP)	U.S. Postal Service	22h 35' 39"
2	Floyd Landis (USA)	U.S. Postal Service	s.t.
3	Denis Menchov (RUS)	Illes Balears–Banesto	+ 4"
4	Alejandro Valverde (ESP)	Comunidad Valenciana–Kelme	+ 9"
5	Cadel Evans (AUS)	T-Mobile Team	+ 16"
6	Benoît Joachim (LUX)	U.S. Postal Service	+ 23"
7	Francisco Mancebo (ESP)	Illes Balears–Banesto	+ 39"
8	Carlos García Quesada (ESP)	Comunidad Valenciana–Kelme	+ 47"
9	Víctor Hugo Peña (COL)	U.S. Postal Service	s.t.
10	Tyler Hamilton (USA)	Phonak	+ 50"

== Stage 7 ==
10 September 2004 — Castellón de la Plana to Valencia, 170 km (110 mi)

Stage 7 result

Rank	Rider	Team	Time
1	Alessandro Petacchi (ITA)	Fassa Bortolo	3h 53' 04"
2	Erik Zabel (GER)	T-Mobile Team	s.t.
3	Óscar Freire (ESP)	Rabobank	s.t.
4	Stuart O'Grady (AUS)	Cofidis	s.t.
5	Luca Paolini (ITA)	Quick-Step–Davitamon	s.t.
6	Pedro Horrillo (ESP)	Quick-Step–Davitamon	s.t.
7	Giosuè Bonomi (ESP)	Saeco	s.t.
8	Andy Flickinger (FRA)	AG2R Prévoyance	s.t.
9	Cristian Moreni (ITA)	Alessio–Bianchi	s.t.
10	Miguel Ángel Martín Perdiguero (ESP)	Saunier Duval–Prodir	s.t.

General classification after stage 7

Rank	Rider	Team	Time
1	Manuel Beltrán (ESP)	U.S. Postal Service	26h 28' 43"
2	Floyd Landis (USA)	U.S. Postal Service	s.t.
3	Denis Menchov (RUS)	Illes Balears–Banesto	+ 4"
4	Alejandro Valverde (ESP)	Comunidad Valenciana–Kelme	+ 9"
5	Cadel Evans (AUS)	T-Mobile Team	+ 16"
6	Benoît Joachim (LUX)	U.S. Postal Service	+ 23"
7	Francisco Mancebo (ESP)	Illes Balears–Banesto	+ 39"
8	Carlos García Quesada (ESP)	Comunidad Valenciana–Kelme	+ 47"
9	Víctor Hugo Peña (COL)	U.S. Postal Service	s.t.
10	Tyler Hamilton (USA)	Phonak	+ 50"

== Stage 8 ==
11 September 2004 — Almussafes to Almussafes, 40.1 km (24.9 mi) (ITT)

Stage 8 result

Rank	Rider	Team	Time
1	Tyler Hamilton (USA)	Phonak	46' 16"
2	Víctor Hugo Peña (COL)	U.S. Postal Service	+ 15"
3	Floyd Landis (USA)	U.S. Postal Service	+ 18"
4	Manuel Beltrán (ESP)	U.S. Postal Service	+ 28"
5	Isidro Nozal (ESP)	Liberty Seguros	+ 37"
6	Francisco Mancebo (ESP)	Illes Balears–Banesto	+ 57"
7	Rubén Plaza (ESP)	Comunidad Valenciana–Kelme	+ 1' 05"
8	Carlos Sastre (ESP)	Team CSC	+ 1' 09"
9	Bert Grabsch (GER)	Phonak	+ 1' 16"
10	Joost Posthuma (NED)	Rabobank	+ 1' 30"

General classification after stage 8

Rank	Rider	Team	Time
1	Floyd Landis (USA)	U.S. Postal Service	27h 16' 17"
2	Manuel Beltrán (ESP)	U.S. Postal Service	+ 10"
3	Tyler Hamilton (USA)	Phonak	+ 32"
4	Víctor Hugo Peña (COL)	U.S. Postal Service	+ 33"
5	Francisco Mancebo (ESP)	Illes Balears–Banesto	+ 1' 18"
6	Alejandro Valverde (ESP)	Comunidad Valenciana–Kelme	+ 1' 23"
7	Isidro Nozal (ESP)	Liberty Seguros	+ 1' 36"
8	Benoît Joachim (LUX)	U.S. Postal Service	+ 1' 40"
9	Cadel Evans (AUS)	T-Mobile Team	+ 1' 47"
10	Carlos Sastre (ESP)	Team CSC	+ 1' 58"

== Stage 9 ==
12 September 2004 — Xàtiva to Alto de Aitana, 162 km (101 mi)

Stage 9 result

Rank	Rider	Team	Time
1	Leonardo Piepoli (ITA)	Saunier Duval–Prodir	4' 29' 36"
2	Roberto Heras (ESP)	Liberty Seguros	+ 4"
3	Isidro Nozal (ESP)	Liberty Seguros	+ 10"
4	Francisco Mancebo (ESP)	Illes Balears–Banesto	+ 15"
5	Jorge Ferrío (ESP)	Costa de Almería–Paternina	+ 25"
6	Alejandro Valverde (ESP)	Comunidad Valenciana–Kelme	+ 29"
7	Denis Menchov (RUS)	Illes Balears–Banesto	+ 41"
8	Carlos Sastre (ESP)	Team CSC	+ 52"
9	Floyd Landis (USA)	U.S. Postal Service	+ 55"
10	Aitor González (ESP)	Fassa Bortolo	+ 1' 09"

General classification after stage 9

Rank	Rider	Team	Time
1	Floyd Landis (USA)	U.S. Postal Service	31h 46' 48"
2	Manuel Beltrán (ESP)	U.S. Postal Service	+ 33"
3	Francisco Mancebo (ESP)	Illes Balears–Banesto	+ 38"
4	Isidro Nozal (ESP)	Liberty Seguros	+ 51"
5	Alejandro Valverde (ESP)	Comunidad Valenciana–Kelme	+ 57"
6	Roberto Heras (ESP)	Liberty Seguros	+ 1' 35"
7	Denis Menchov (RUS)	Illes Balears–Banesto	+ 1' 52"
8	Carlos Sastre (ESP)	Team CSC	+ 1' 55"
9	Aitor González (ESP)	Fassa Bortolo	+ 2' 25"
10	David Blanco (ESP)	Comunidad Valenciana–Kelme	+ 3' 30"

== Stage 10 ==
13 September 2004 — Alcoy to Xorret de Catí, 174.2 km (108.2 mi)

Stage 10 result

Rank	Rider	Team	Time
1	Eladio Jiménez (ESP)	Comunidad Valenciana–Kelme	4' 31' 57"
2	Stuart O'Grady (AUS)	Cofidis	+ 32"
3	Óscar Freire (ESP)	Rabobank	+ 48"
4	Ruslan Ivanov (MDA)	Alessio–Bianchi	s.t.
5	Juan Fuentes (ESP)	Saeco	+ 1' 04"
6	José Miguel Elías (ESP)	Relax–Bodysol	+ 1' 10"
7	Erik Zabel (GER)	T-Mobile Team	+ 1' 50"
8	Jorge Ferrío (ESP)	Costa de Almería–Paternina	+ 4' 06"
9	Alejandro Valverde (ESP)	Comunidad Valenciana–Kelme	+ 4' 18"
10	Roberto Heras (ESP)	Liberty Seguros	s.t.

General classification after stage 10

Rank	Rider	Team	Time
1	Floyd Landis (USA)	U.S. Postal Service	36h 23' 51"
2	Alejandro Valverde (ESP)	Comunidad Valenciana–Kelme	+ 9"
3	Francisco Mancebo (ESP)	Illes Balears–Banesto	+ 29"
4	Isidro Nozal (ESP)	Liberty Seguros	+ 32"
5	Roberto Heras (ESP)	Liberty Seguros	+ 47"
6	Manuel Beltrán (ESP)	U.S. Postal Service	+ 59"
7	Carlos Sastre (ESP)	Team CSC	+ 1' 35"
8	Denis Menchov (RUS)	Illes Balears–Banesto	+ 2' 42"
9	Aitor González (ESP)	Fassa Bortolo	+ 2' 50"
10	Ángel Gómez (ESP)	Costa de Almería–Paternina	+ 4' 16"

== Stage 11 ==
14 September 2004 — San Vicente del Raspeig to Caravaca de la Cruz, 165 km (103 mi)

Stage 11 result

Rank	Rider	Team	Time
1	David Zabriskie (USA)	U.S. Postal Service	4' 05' 31"
2	Alessandro Petacchi (ITA)	Fassa Bortolo	+ 1' 11"
3	Stuart O'Grady (AUS)	Cofidis	s.t.
4	Marco Zanotti (ITA)	Vini Caldirola–Nobili Rubinetterie	s.t.
5	Erik Zabel (GER)	T-Mobile Team	s.t.
6	Stefano Garzelli (ITA)	Vini Caldirola–Nobili Rubinetterie	s.t.
7	Jorge Ferrío (ESP)	Costa de Almería–Paternina	s.t.
8	Erki Pütsep (EST)	AG2R Prévoyance	s.t.
9	Aitor Pérez (ESP)	Cafés Baqué	s.t.
10	Antonio Cruz (USA)	U.S. Postal Service	s.t.

General classification after stage 11

Rank	Rider	Team	Time
1	Floyd Landis (USA)	U.S. Postal Service	40h 30' 33"
2	Alejandro Valverde (ESP)	Comunidad Valenciana–Kelme	+ 9"
3	Francisco Mancebo (ESP)	Illes Balears–Banesto	+ 29"
4	Isidro Nozal (ESP)	Liberty Seguros	+ 32"
5	Roberto Heras (ESP)	Liberty Seguros	+ 47"
6	Manuel Beltrán (ESP)	U.S. Postal Service	+ 59"
7	Carlos Sastre (ESP)	Team CSC	+ 1' 35"
8	Denis Menchov (RUS)	Illes Balears–Banesto	+ 2' 42"
9	Aitor González (ESP)	Fassa Bortolo	+ 2' 50"
10	Ángel Gómez (ESP)	Costa de Almería–Paternina	+ 4' 16"
