= Iulia =

Iulia is a feminine given name tracing back to the Ancient Romans. It may refer to:

== People ==
- Iulia Aquilia Severa
- Iulia Berenice
- Iulia Hasdeu
- Iulia Leorda
- Iulia Motoc
- Iulia Necula

== Places ==
- Iulia (Lydia)
- Iulia Concordia
- Iulia Gordos
- Iulia, a village in Izvoarele Commune, Tulcea County, Romania

== See also ==
- Iuliana, a given name
- Julia (disambiguation)
- Lulia (disambiguation)
