= Julia =

Julia may refer to:

== People ==
- Julia (given name), including a list of people with the name
- Julia (surname), including a list of people with the name
- Julia gens, a patrician family of Ancient Rome
- Julia (clairvoyant) (fl. 1689), lady's maid of Queen Christina of Sweden in Rome, alleged clairvoyant and predictor

== Science and technology ==
- Julia (programming language), a computer language with features suited for numerical analysis and computational science
- Julia (underwater sound), recorded by the NOAA in 1999
- Julia (gastropod), a genus of minute bivalved gastropods in the family Juliidae
- Julia butterfly, Dryas iulia, misspelled as Dryas julia

== Television ==
- Julia (1968 TV series), a 1968–1971 American series starring Diahann Carroll
- Julia (2022 TV series), an American drama series
- Julia (Mexican TV series), a 1979 Mexican telenovela
- Julia (Polish TV series), a 2012 Polish soap opera
- Julia (Venezuelan TV series), a 1983 Venezuelan TV series
- "Julia" (Brideshead Revisited), a 1981 episode
- Julia (Sesame Street), a Muppet character on the children's television program

== Films ==
- Julia (1974 film), a West German erotic film starring Sylvia Kristel
- Julia (1977 film), an American drama starring Jane Fonda, Jason Robards and Vanessa Redgrave
- Julia (2008 film), a French crime drama starring Tilda Swinton
- Julia (2014 film), an American neo-noir horror film starring Ashley C. Williams
- Julia (2021 film), a documentary about Julia Child
- Julia(s), a 2022 French romance film

== Songs ==
- "Julia" (Beatles song), 1968
- "Julia" (Chris Rea song), 1993
- "Julia" (Conway Twitty song), 1987
- "Julia" (Eurythmics song), 1984
- "Julia" (Nick & Simon song), 2012
- "Julia", a song by Ekseption from the album Beggar Julia's Time Trip
- "Julia", a 1958 Italian song by Johnny Dorelli
- "Julia", a single from the 2017 album American Love by the Fast Romantics
- "Julia", a song by Goudie from the 2000 album Peep Show
- "Julia", a song from the 2014 album Jungle by Jungle
- "Julia", a song from the album Please Come Home... Mr. Bulbous by King's X
- "Julia", a song from the album Naveed by Our Lady Peace
- "Julia", a 1975 song by Pavlov's Dog
- "Julia", a song from the 1997 album Silver Sun by Silver Sun
- "Julia", a song from the 2018 album Blood Red Roses by Rod Stewart
- "Julia", a song from the 2014 EP Z by SZA
- "Julia", a song by Wang Leehom
- "Julia", a song from the 2011 album Adelphi Has to Fly by Lucy Ward

== Places ==
- Julia (Lydia), a town of ancient Lydia
- Julia (river), Switzerland
- Julia, Greater Poland Voivodeship, Poland
- Julia, West Virginia, United States

== Other uses ==
- 89 Julia, an asteroid
- Julia (comics) (le avventure di una criminologa), an Italian comic book series
- Julia (novel), 1975 novel by Peter Straub
- Julia, 2023 novel by Sandra Newman
- J.U.L.I.A., a 2012 indie video game
- "Julia", a speaking recording by Raffi on his 1995 album: Raffi Radio
- Alpine Brigade Julia, a mountain warfare brigade of the Italian Army
- List of storms named Julia, name used for storms in the Atlantic Ocean

== See also ==
- Julia set, in mathematics
- Julieta (disambiguation)
