= Juliya =

Juliya may refer to:

- Juliya Chernetsky (born 1982), American television personality
- Juliya (film), a 2009 Sri Lankan Sinhala comedy film

== See also ==
- Yulia, a female given name
- Julia (disambiguation)
