= 1997 Vuelta a Murcia =

Race details
- Dates: 5–9 March 1997
- Stages: 5
- Distance: 788.2 km (489.8 mi)
- Winning time: 18h 44' 23"

Results
	Winner	Juan Carlos Dominguez (ESP)
	Second	Ignacio García Camacho (ESP)
	Third	Santos González (ESP)

The 1997 Vuelta a Murcia was the 13th edition of the Vuelta a Murcia cycle race and was held on 5 March to 9 March 1997. The race started and finished in Murcia. The race was won by Juan Carlos Dominguez.

== General classification ==
Final general classification

Rank	Rider	Time
1	Juan Carlos Dominguez (ESP)	18h 44' 23"
2	Ignacio García Camacho (ESP)	+ 8"
3	Santos González (ESP)	+ 24"
4	Claus Michael Møller (DEN)	+ 47"
5	Alex Zülle (SWI)	+ 2' 26"
6	Pavel Padrnos (CZE)	+ 3' 00"
7	Michel Lafis (SWE)	+ 3' 02"
8	Roberto Heras (ESP)	+ 3' 30"
9	Álvaro González de Galdeano (ESP)	+ 3' 32"
10	Manuel Beltrán (ESP)	+ 3' 33"
