= Julieta =

Julieta may refer to:

- Julieta (apple), a variety of apple
- Julieta Madrigal, a character from Encanto
- Julieta (name), a female given name, a variant of Julia

== See also ==
- , including many people with forename Julieta
- Julia (disambiguation)
