= 2002 Vuelta a Burgos =

Race details
- Dates: 12–16 August 2002
- Stages: 5
- Distance: 682 km (423.8 mi)
- Winning time: 16h 57' 55"

Results
	Winner	Francisco Mancebo (ESP)	(iBanesto.com)
	Second	José Luis Rubiera (ESP)	(U.S. Postal Service)
	Third	Mikel Zarrabeitia (ESP)	(ONCE–Eroski)

The 2002 Vuelta a Burgos was the 24th edition of the Vuelta a Burgos road cycling stage race, which was held from 12 August to 16 August 2002. The race started and finished in Burgos. The race was won by Francisco Mancebo of the iBanesto.com team.

== General classification ==
Final general classification

Rank	Rider	Team	Time
1	Francisco Mancebo (ESP)	iBanesto.com	16h 57' 55"
2	José Luis Rubiera (ESP)	U.S. Postal Service	+ 12"
3	Mikel Zarrabeitia (ESP)	ONCE–Eroski	+ 21"
4	Michael Rasmussen (DEN)	CSC–Tiscali	+ 26"
5	Juan Carlos Domínguez (ESP)	Phonak	+ 41"
6	Carlos García (ESP)	Kelme–Costa Blanca	+ 49"
7	Isidro Nozal (ESP)	ONCE–Eroski	+ 1' 27"
8	Roberto Heras (ESP)	U.S. Postal Service	+ 1' 41"
9	Juan Miguel Mercado (ESP)	iBanesto.com	+ 1' 42"
10	Gilberto Simoni (ITA)	Saeco–Longoni Sport	+ 2' 04"
