= 2004 Vuelta a España =

59th edition of Vuelta a España

Race details
- Dates: 4–26 September
- Stages: 21
- Distance: 2,925 km (1,818 mi)
- Winning time: 77h 42' 46"

Results
Jersey awarded to the overall winner	Winner	Roberto Heras (ESP)	(Liberty Seguros)
	Second	Santiago Pérez (ESP)	(Phonak)
	Third	Francisco Mancebo (ESP)	(Illes Balears–Banesto)
Jersey awarded to the points classification winner	Points	Erik Zabel (GER)	(T-Mobile Team)
Jersey awarded to the mountains classification winner	Mountains	Félix Cárdenas (COL)	(Orbitel)
Jersey awarded to the combination classification winner	Combination	Roberto Heras (ESP)	(Liberty Seguros)
	Team	Comunidad Valenciana–Kelme	

The 59th edition of the Vuelta a España (Tour of Spain), a long-distance bicycle stage race and one of the three grand tours, was held from 4 September to 26 September 2004. It consisted of 21 stages covering a total of 2,925 km (1,818 mi), and was won by Roberto Heras of the Liberty Seguros cycling team.

Halfway through the 2004 Vuelta, it appeared it would become an easy win for Heras, but in the last week his fellow countryman Santiago Pérez won two heavy mountain stages, thus becoming an important rival. Eventually Heras won with only 30 seconds advantage on Pérez. Pérez and Phonak hearing systems teammate Tyler Hamilton would later test positive for blood doping from blood samples taken during the race. Francisco Mancebo, also from Spain took third. The first non-Spaniard was Stefano Garzelli from Italy in 11th. The points classification was won by Erik Zabel from Germany, the mountains classification was won by Félix Cárdenas from Colombia and the combination classification was won by Roberto Heras. Kelme was the winner of the team ranking. Alessandro Petacchi, an Italian sprinter won four stages, but he did not finish the Vuelta.

== Route ==
List of stages
Stage	Date	Course	Distance	Type	Winner
1	4 September	León to León	28 km (17 mi)	Team time trial	U.S. Postal Service
2	5 September	León to Burgos	207 km (129 mi)		Alessandro Petacchi (ITA)
3	6 September	Burgos to Soria	156 km (97 mi)		Alejandro Valverde (ESP)
4	7 September	Soria to Zaragoza	167 km (104 mi)		Alessandro Petacchi (ITA)
5	8 September	Zaragoza to Morella	186.5 km (116 mi)		Denis Menchov (RUS)
6	9 September	Benicarló to Castellón de la Plana	157 km (98 mi)		Óscar Freire (ESP)
7	10 September	Castellón de la Plana to Valencia	170 km (106 mi)		Alessandro Petacchi (ITA)
8	11 September	Almussafes to Almussafes	40.1 km (25 mi)	Individual time trial	~~Tyler Hamilton~~; Víctor Hugo Peña (COL)
9	12 September	Xàtiva to Alto de Aitana	162 km (101 mi)		Leonardo Piepoli (ITA)
10	13 September	Alcoy to Xorret de Catí	174.2 km (108 mi)		Eladio Jiménez (ESP)
11	14 September	San Vicente del Raspeig to Caravaca de la Cruz	165 km (103 mi)		~~David Zabriskie~~
	15 September			Rest day	
12	16 September	Almería to Calar Alto Observatory	145 km (90 mi)		Roberto Heras (ESP)
13	17 September	El Ejido to Málaga	172 km (107 mi)		Alessandro Petacchi (ITA)
14	18 September	Málaga to Granada	167 km (104 mi)		Santiago Pérez (ESP)
15	19 September	Granada to Sierra Nevada	29.6 km (18 mi)	Individual time trial	Santiago Pérez (ESP)
	20 September			Rest day	
16	21 September	Olivenza to Cáceres	190.1 km (118 mi)		José Julia (ESP)
17	22 September	Plasencia to La Covatilla	170 km (106 mi)		Félix Cárdenas (COL)
18	23 September	Béjar to Ávila	196 km (122 mi)		Javier Pascual Rodríguez (ESP)
19	24 September	Ávila to Collado Villalba	142 km (88 mi)		Constantino Zaballa (ESP)
20	25 September	Alcobendas to Puerto de Navacerrada	178 km (111 mi)		José Enrique Gutiérrez (ESP)
21	26 September	Madrid to Madrid	28 km (17 mi)	Individual time trial	Santiago Pérez (ESP)
	Total		2,925 km (1,818 mi)		

== Jersey progress ==
Stage (Winner)	General classification	Points Classification	Mountains Classification	Combination Classification	Team Classification
Stage 1 (TTT) (U.S. Postal Service)	Floyd Landis	Floyd Landis	Floyd Landis	Floyd Landis	U.S. Postal Service
Stage 2 (Alessandro Petacchi)	Max van Heeswijk	Erik Zabel	Floyd Landis	Floyd Landis	U.S. Postal Service
Stage 3 (Alejandro Valverde)	Benoît Joachim	Stuart O'Grady	Floyd Landis	Floyd Landis	U.S. Postal Service
Stage 4 (Alessandro Petacchi)	Benoît Joachim	Erik Zabel	Floyd Landis	Floyd Landis	U.S. Postal Service
Stage 5 (Denis Menchov)	Manuel Beltrán	Stuart O'Grady	Juan Manuel Gárate	Floyd Landis	U.S. Postal Service
Stage 6 (Óscar Freire)	Manuel Beltrán	Stuart O'Grady	Francisco Mancebo	Manuel Beltrán	U.S. Postal Service
Stage 7 (Alessandro Petacchi)	Manuel Beltrán	Erik Zabel	Francisco Mancebo	Denis Menchov	U.S. Postal Service
Stage 8 (Tyler Hamilton)	Floyd Landis	Erik Zabel	Francisco Mancebo	Floyd Landis	U.S. Postal Service
Stage 9 (Leonardo Piepoli)	Floyd Landis	Erik Zabel	David Fernández	Francisco Mancebo	U.S. Postal Service
Stage 10 (Eladio Jiménez)	Floyd Landis	Stuart O'Grady	José Miguel Elías	Francisco Mancebo	Comunidad Valenciana–Kelme
Stage 11 (David Zabriskie)	Floyd Landis	Stuart O'Grady	José Miguel Elías	Alejandro Valverde	Comunidad Valenciana–Kelme
Stage 12 (Roberto Heras)	Roberto Heras	Stuart O'Grady	Roberto Heras	Roberto Heras	Comunidad Valenciana–Kelme
Stage 13 (Alessandro Petacchi)	Roberto Heras	Erik Zabel	Roberto Heras	Roberto Heras	Comunidad Valenciana–Kelme
Stage 14 (Santiago Pérez)	Roberto Heras	Erik Zabel	Roberto Heras	Roberto Heras	Comunidad Valenciana–Kelme
Stage 15 (ITT) (Santiago Pérez)	Roberto Heras	Erik Zabel	Roberto Heras	Roberto Heras	Comunidad Valenciana–Kelme
Stage 16 (José Julía)	Roberto Heras	Erik Zabel	Roberto Heras	Roberto Heras	Comunidad Valenciana–Kelme
Stage 17 (Félix Cárdenas)	Roberto Heras	Erik Zabel	Félix Cárdenas	Roberto Heras	Comunidad Valenciana–Kelme
Stage 18 (Javier Pascual Rodríguez)	Roberto Heras	Erik Zabel	Félix Cárdenas	Roberto Heras	Comunidad Valenciana–Kelme
Stage 19 (Constantino Zaballa)	Roberto Heras	Erik Zabel	Félix Cárdenas	Roberto Heras	Comunidad Valenciana–Kelme
Stage 20 (José Enrique Gutiérrez)	Roberto Heras	Erik Zabel	Félix Cárdenas	Roberto Heras	Comunidad Valenciana–Kelme
Stage 21 (ITT) (Santiago Pérez)	Roberto Heras	Erik Zabel	Félix Cárdenas	Roberto Heras	Comunidad Valenciana–Kelme
Final	Roberto Heras	Erik Zabel	Félix Cárdenas	Roberto Heras	Comunidad Valenciana–Kelme

=== General classification (final) ===
Rank	Rider	Team	Time
1	Roberto Heras (ESP)	Liberty Seguros	77h42'46"
2	Santiago Pérez (ESP)	Phonak	30"
3	Francisco Mancebo (ESP)	Illes Balears–Banesto	2'13"
4	Alejandro Valverde (ESP)	Comunidad Valenciana–Kelme	3'30"
5	Carlos García Quesada (ESP)	Comunidad Valenciana–Kelme	7'44"
6	Carlos Sastre (ESP)	Team CSC	8'11"
7	Isidro Nozal (ESP)	Liberty Seguros	8'32"
8	José Ángel Gómez Marchante (ESP)	Paternina–Costa de Almería	13'08"
9	Luis Pérez (ESP)	Cofidis	13'24"
10	David Blanco (ESP)	Comunidad Valenciana–Kelme	15'15"
11	Stefano Garzelli (ITA)	Vini Caldirola–Nobili Rubinetterie	16'33"
12	Marcos Serrano (ESP)	Liberty Seguros	17'14"
13	Manuel Beltrán (ESP)	U.S. Postal Service	17'43"
14	Francisco José Lara (ESP)	Paternina–Costa de Almería	24'16"
15	Samuel Sánchez (ESP)	Euskaltel–Euskadi	29'23"
16	Damiano Cunego (ITA)	Saeco	29'51"
17	Jorge Ferrío (ESP)	Paternina–Costa de Almería	30'49"
18	David Plaza (ESP)	Cafe Baque	31'24"
19	Eladio Jiménez (ESP)	Comunidad Valenciana–Kelme	34'35"
20	Luis Pasamontes (ESP)	Relax–Bergasol	37'49"
21	Unai Osa (ESP)	Illes Balears–Banesto	38'06"
