= Ignacio García (cyclist) =

Spanish cyclist

Personal information
- Full name: Ignacio García Camacho
- Born: 4 August 1968 (age 58) Cieza, Murcia, Spain

Cycling career
- Sport: Cycling
- Discipline: Road
- Role: Rider

Professional team
- 1991–1998: Kelme–Ibexpress

Ignacio García Camacho (born 4 August 1968) is a Spanish former professional racing cyclist. He rode in one edition of the Tour de France, two editions of the Giro d'Italia and four editions of the Vuelta a España.

== Major results ==
1991
1st Stage 2 Vuelta a los Valles Mineros
5th Overall Vuelta a Aragón
1993
1st Road race, National Road Championships
1994
4th Subida al Naranco
1995
8th Clasica de Sabiñánigo
1996
2nd Overall Vuelta a Mallorca
1997
2nd Overall Vuelta a Murcia

1st Stage 2
