= Lulia (disambiguation) =

Lulia is a genus of Brazilian flowering plants in the family Asteraceae.

Lulia may also refer to:

- Lulia Lulia, Cook Islands international rugby league footballer
- Keith Lulia, Cook Islands international rugby league footballer

== See also ==
- Iulia (disambiguation) (starts with upper case I)
