= 1999 Volta a Catalunya =

Race details
- Dates: 17–24 June 1999
- Stages: 7 + Prologue
- Distance: 910 km (565.4 mi)
- Winning time: 23h 40' 32"

Results
	Winner	Manuel Beltrán (ESP)	(Banesto)
	Second	Roberto Heras (ESP)	(Kelme–Costa Blanca)
	Third	José María Jiménez (ESP)	(Banesto)
	Mountains	Dmitri Konyshev (RUS)	(Mercatone Uno–Bianchi)
	Sprints	Mariano Piccoli (ITA)	(Lampre–Daikin)
	Team	Banesto	

The 1999 Volta a Catalunya was the 79th edition of the Volta a Catalunya cycle race and was held from 17 June to 24 June 1999. The race started in La Pineda and finished at the Alto de la Rabassa in Andorra. The race was won by Manuel Beltrán of the Banesto team.

== Teams ==
Fifteen teams of up to eight riders started the race:

- Vitalicio Seguros
- Team Telekom
- Kelme–Costa Blanca
- Mercatone Uno–Bianchi
- Banesto
- Mapei–Quick-Step
- ONCE–Deutsche Bank
- TVM–Farm Frites
- Saeco–Cannondale
- Euskaltel–Euskadi
- Lotto–Mobistar
- Fuenlabrada
- Lampre–Daikin
- Festina–Lotus
- U.S. Postal Service

== Route ==
Stage characteristics and winners
Stage	Date	Course	Distance	Type	Winner
P	17 June	La Pineda to Vila-seca	8.1 km (5.0 mi)	Individual time trial	Ángel Casero (ESP)
1	18 June	Vila-seca Tortosa	161.2 km (100.2 mi)		Mario Cipollini (ITA)
2	19 June	Tortosa to Vilanova i la Geltrú	172.5 km (107.2 mi)		Mario Cipollini (ITA)
3	20 June	~~Vilanova i la Geltrú to Barcelona~~	~~155.6 km (96.7 mi)~~		Annulled (Note: The stage was annulled as a mark of respect to Manuel Sanroma, who suffered a fatal crash towards the end of the previous stage.)
4	21 June	Badalona to Badalona	182.4 km (113.3 mi)		Erik Zabel (GER)
5	22 June	El Masnou to Banyoles	174.8 km (108.6 mi)		Erik Zabel (GER)
6	23 June	Banyoles to Els Cortals d'Encamp	196.8 km (122.3 mi)		Roberto Heras (ESP)
7	24 June	Sant Julià de Lòria to Alto de la Rabassa	14.2 km (8.8 mi)	Individual time trial	Manuel Beltrán (ESP)

== General classification ==
Final general classification

Rank	Rider	Team	Time
1	Manuel Beltrán (ESP)	Banesto	23h 40' 32"
2	Roberto Heras (ESP)	Kelme–Costa Blanca	+ 57"
3	José María Jiménez (ESP)	Banesto	+ 1' 00"
4	Joseba Beloki (ESP)	Euskaltel–Euskadi	+ 1' 02"
5	Georg Totschnig (AUT)	Team Telekom	+ 1' 44"
6	Roberto Laiseka (ESP)	Euskaltel–Euskadi	+ 2' 43"
7	Fernando Escartín (ESP)	Kelme–Costa Blanca	+ 3' 01"
8	Hernán Buenahora (COL)	Vitalicio Seguros	+ 3' 13"
9	Ángel Casero (ESP)	Vitalicio Seguros	+ 3' 26"
10	Haimar Zubeldia (ESP)	Euskaltel–Euskadi	+ 4' 05"
