= Arnie Baker =

Canadian cycling coach

- Born: August 6, 1953 (age 72) Montreal, Quebec, Canada
- Occupation: Physician, writer, coach
- Education: McGill University
- Genre: Non-fiction/sport
- Subject: Bicycling

Arnie Baker (born August 6, 1953) is a Canadian-born bicycle coach, racer, and writer.

== Career ==
Born in Montreal, Quebec, Canada, Baker has coached road and mountain bike racers to several Olympic Games, more than 120 U.S. National Championships and 40 U.S. records. He is the National Cycling Coach for Team in Training, a program of more than 800 coaches and 30,000 participants that raises more than $80 million yearly for the Leukemia & Lymphoma Society.

Baker has a Category 1 U.S. Cycling Federation racing license. He has held eight U.S. 40-K time trial records, has won six national championships, and has won more than 200 races.

Baker has authored or co-authored 16 books and more than 1,000 articles on bicycling and bicycling-related subjects.

He obtained his M.D. and master's degree in surgery from McGill University, Montreal in 1978. He is a board-certified family physician, living in San Diego. He has served on the fitness board of several publications including Bicycling Magazine. He has also been a medical consultant to USA Cycling and the International Olympic Committee.

== The Floyd Landis doping case ==
Arnie Baker was involved in the defense of Floyd Landis who had failed a drug test while leading the Tour de France. He was given a 12-month suspended sentence by a French court for his use of documents obtained by hacking in this defence. The court itself has said that no evidence linked him to the hacking. He has consistently denied having had any role in the hacking or in having knowingly received illegally obtained documents. He denounced the French case against him as "deeply flawed."

== Books ==
- Altitude, Climbing, Endurance (ACE) Training for Cyclists
- Bicycling Medicine
- Bike Fit
- Medicina del Ciclismo
- The Essential Cyclist
- Essentials of Training and Racing
- High-Intensity-Training (HIT) for Cyclists
- Nutrition for Sports
- Psychling Psychology (Mind Training for Cyclists)
- Running Injuries: Prevention & Treatment
- Skills Training for Cyclists
- Smart Coaching
- Smart Cycling
- Strategy & Tactics for Cyclists
- Road Cycling: International Olympic Committee Handbook of Cycling, co-author, medical chapter
- Principles & Practice of Primary Care Sports Medicine, co-author, cycling chapter
- 6 Steps to Winning Time Trials, co-author, chapter
