= 2004 Tour of the Basque Country =

Race details
- Dates: 5–9 April 2004
- Stages: 5
- Distance: 766.5 km (476.3 mi)
- Winning time: 19h 25' 46"

Results
	Winner	Denis Menchov (RUS)	(Illes Balears–Banesto)
	Second	Iban Mayo (ESP)	(Euskaltel–Euskadi)
	Third	David Etxebarria (ESP)	(Euskaltel–Euskadi)

The 2004 Tour of the Basque Country was the 44th edition of the Tour of the Basque Country cycle race and was held from 5 April to 9 April 2004. The race started in Bergara and finished in Lazkao. The race was won by Denis Menchov of the Illes Balears–Banesto team.

== General classification ==
Final general classification

Rank	Rider	Team	Time
1	Denis Menchov (RUS)	Illes Balears–Banesto	19h 25' 46"
2	Iban Mayo (ESP)	Euskaltel–Euskadi	+ 21"
3	David Etxebarria (ESP)	Euskaltel–Euskadi	+ 22"
4	Bobby Julich (USA)	Team CSC	+ 30"
~~5~~	~~Levi Leipheimer (USA)~~	~~Rabobank~~	~~+ 34"~~ (Note: Leipheimer was disqualified from all results between 1 June 1999 and 30 July 2006, following an investigation by USADA.)
6	Alejandro Valverde (ESP)	Comunidad Valenciana–Kelme	+ 39"
7	Floyd Landis (USA)	U.S. Postal Service	+ 43"
8	Samuel Sánchez (ESP)	Euskaltel–Euskadi	+ 47"
9	Koldo Gil (ESP)	Liberty Seguros	+ 49"
10	Jorge Ferrío (ESP)	Costa de Almería–Paternina	+ 1' 02"
