= Julia (surname) =

Julia is a surname. Notable people with the surname include:

- Bernard Julia (born 1952), French physicist
- Cassie Julia, American politician
- Charles H. Juliá (1908–1979), Puerto Rican senator
- Denise Julia (born 2002), Filipino singer
- Didier Julia (born 1934), French politician
- Dominique Julia (born 1940), French historian
- Gaston Julia (1893–1978), French mathematician
- Javier Julia, Argentine cinematographer and film editor
- José Julia (born 1979), Spanish cyclist
- Martha Julia (born 1973), Mexican actress
- Raúl Juliá (1940–1994), Puerto Rican actor
