= Antonio Cruz (cyclist) =

American cyclist (born 1971)

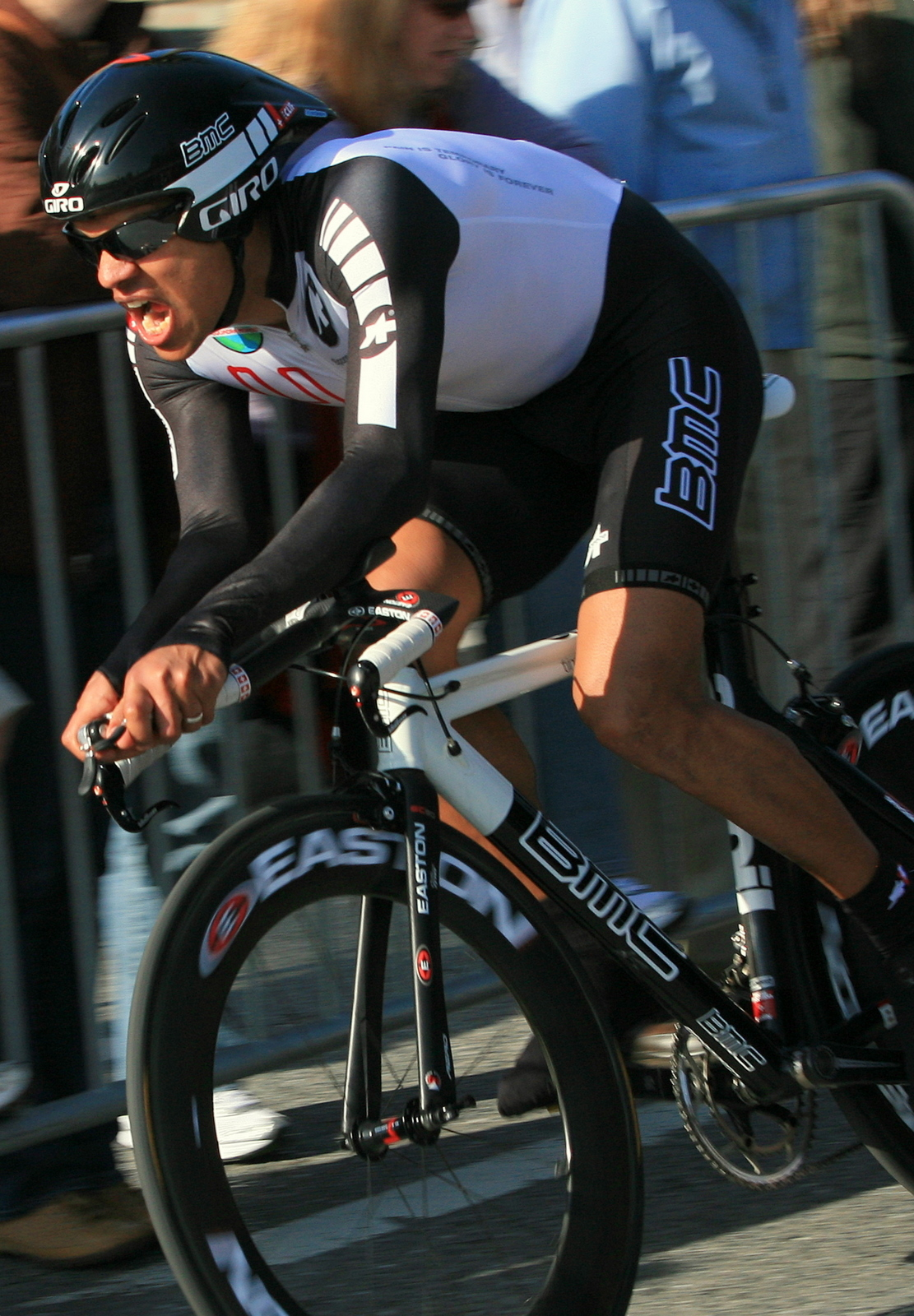
- Cruz in the Prologue of the 2008 Tour of California

Personal information
- Full name: Antonio Cruz
- Born: October 31, 1971 (age 54) Long Beach, California, United States of America
- Height: 5 ft 6 in (1.68 m)

Cycling career
- Sport: Cycling
- Current team: Retired
- Discipline: Road
- Role: Rider

Professional teams
- 2001: Saturn
- 2002–2005: U.S. Postal Service
- 2006: Toyota–United
- 2007: Discovery Channel
- 2008–2009: BMC Racing Team

Antonio "Tony" Cruz (born October 31, 1971) is an American former professional road bicycle racer from the United States, who last rode for BMC Racing Team. In 1999 Cruz was the USPRO National Criterium Champion, and became professional. In 2000 he finished 3rd at the USPRO National Championships Criterium in Downer’s Grove, Illinois.

In 2004 and 2006 Tony Cruz won the Tour de Nez. He also finished fourth on stage 16 of the 2004 Vuelta a España. He is of Mexican American descent.

== Major results ==
1999
1st United States National Criterium Championships

2000
1st 1 stage, Solano Bicycle Race
1st U.S. Olympic Road Race Trials, Member U.S. Olympic Road Team

2001
1st 1 stage, Tour de Langkawi

2004
1st Tour de Nez
1st 1 stage, Tour de l'Ain

2005
1st Tour de Nez

2006
1st Tour de Nez
