= Santiago Pérez (cyclist) =

Spanish cyclist

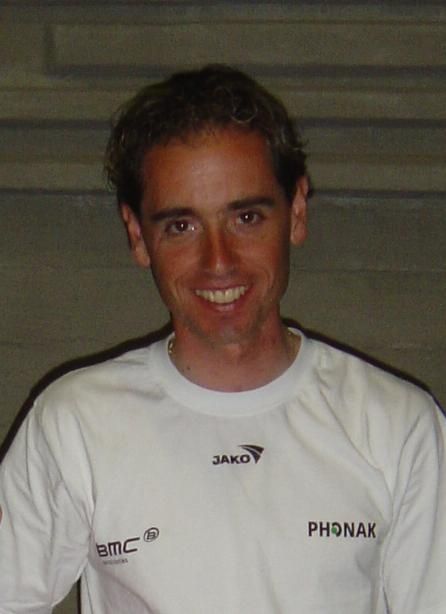

Personal information
- Full name: Santiago Pérez Fernández
- Nickname: Santi Pérez
- Born: 5 August 1977 (age 49) Vega de Peridiello, Spain
- Height: 1.79 m (5 ft 10 1/2 in)
- Weight: 61 kg (134 lb)

Cycling career
- Sport: Cycling
- Discipline: Road
- Role: Rider
- Rider type: Climbing specialist

Amateur team
- 1999–2001: Saunier Duval

Professional teams
- 2001: Barbot–Torrie
- 2002: Kelme–Costa Blanca
- 2003–2004: Phonak
- 2007: Relax–GAM
- 2008: Centro Ciclismo de Loulé
- 2009: Madeinox–Boavista
- 2010: C.C. Loulé–Louletano–Aquashow
- 2011: Barbot–Efapel

Major wins
- Grand Tours Vuelta a España 3 individual stages (2004)

Santiago Pérez Fernández (born 5 August 1977) is a Spanish professional road bicycle racer, who last rode for Barbot–Efapel.

In March 2005, it was announced that he would be suspended for 2 years after having failed a test for homologous blood transfusion during the 2004 Vuelta a España. He returned to cycling in 2007 with Relax–GAM.

== Major results ==
2000
2nd Overall Volta a Portugal do Futuro

1st Stage 2

2001 (1 pro win)
1st Stage 7 Volta a Portugal
7th Overall Vuelta a Navarra

1st Stage 5

2002
4th Overall Tour de Romandie
2003
2nd Overall Escalada a Montjuïc
6th Overall Setmana Catalana de Ciclisme
2004 (3)
2nd Overall Vuelta a España

1st Stages 14, 15 (ITT) & 21 (ITT)

7th Overall Vuelta a Aragón
10th Overall Vuelta a Andalucía
2008
6th Overall Troféu Joaquim Agostinho
2009
5th Overall Vuelta a Asturias
5th Overall GP Internacional Paredes Rota dos Móveis
2010 (1)
1st Overall GP Liberty Seguros

1st Stage 2

1st Subida al Naranco
3rd Overall Troféu Joaquim Agostinho
5th Overall Vuelta a Asturias
9th Overall Volta ao Alentejo
2011 (1)
1st Gran Premio de Llodio
8th Vuelta a La Rioja

=== Grand Tour general classification results timeline ===
Grand Tour	2002	2003	2004	2005	2006	2007
Giro d'Italia	DNF	—	—	—	—	—
Tour de France	DNF	—	49	—	—	—
Vuelta a España	—	44	2	—	—	65
