= Climbing specialist =

Bicycle racer who rides especially well on highly inclined roads

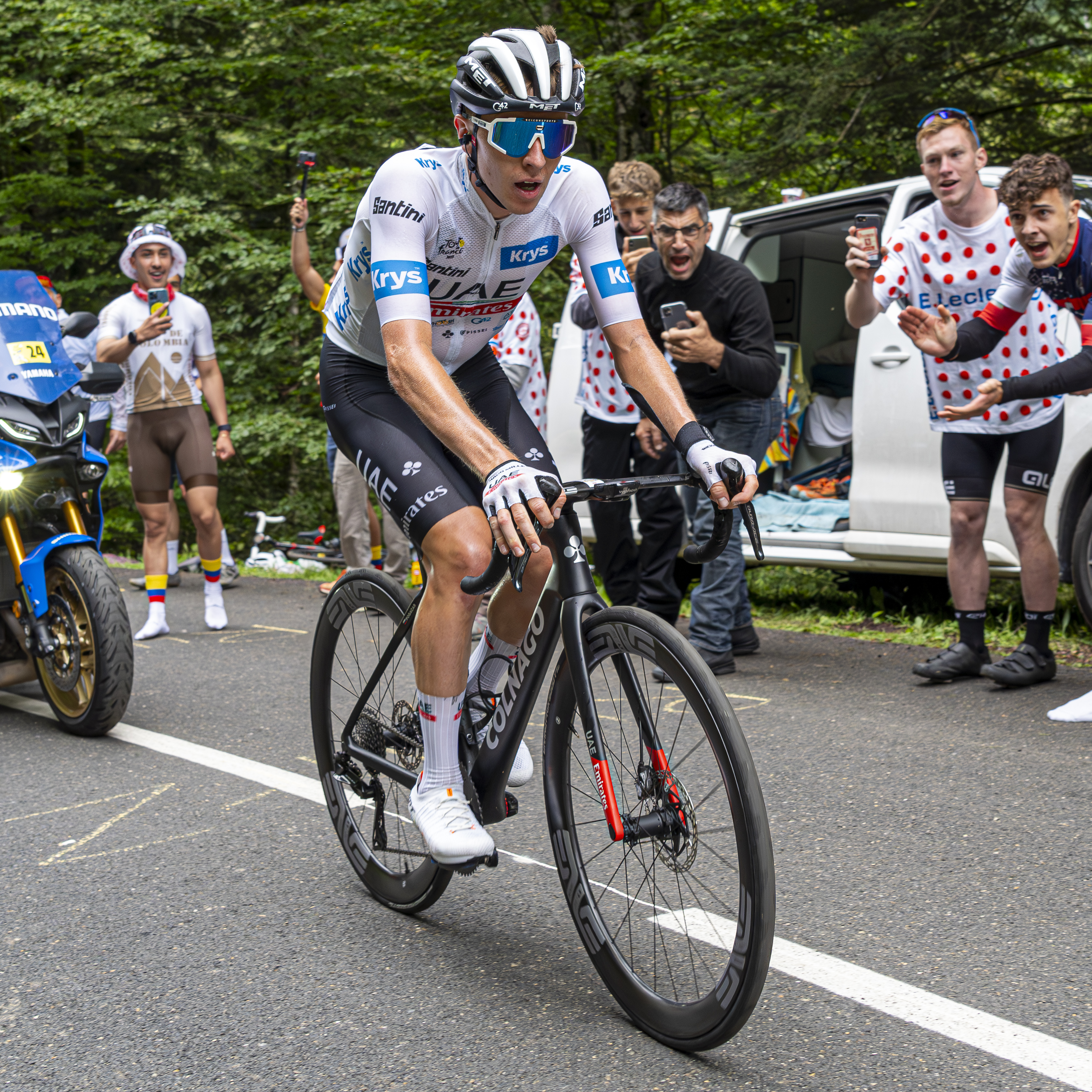
Tadej Pogačar climbing in the 2023 Tour de France

A climbing specialist or climber, also known as a grimpeur, is a road bicycle racer who can ride especially well on highly inclined roads, such as those found among hills or mountains.

== Role of climber in a race ==
In a sustained climb, the average speed declines, the aerodynamic advantage of drafting is diminished and the setting of the group pace becomes more important. A good climber modulates their speed and chooses the best line on a climb, allowing the following riders to have an easier job. If the group maintains a high tempo, it is more difficult for a rider to attack and ride away from the group.

Another important role in climbing is that of attacker or counter-attacker. Climbing specialists use their superior abilities either to attack on climbs and thereby gap the competitors, knowing that only other climbing specialists will be able to stay with them, or simply to maintain a high pace that others cannot match. A successful escape can help the climber achieve a victory if the race has a mountain-top finish, or even in a flat finish if the climber is able to maintain their lead after the climb is over. Climbing stages, along with individual time trials, are crucial for winning long stage races.

In recent years, climbing specialists have been deployed as super-domestiques, protecting team leaders with All-round capabilities by setting a strong tempo in mountain stages to deter attacks from rivals, a tactic known as a 'train'. Examples of this include Team Sky climbers Wout Poels, Mikel Landa and Mikel Nieve helping Chris Froome in his multiple Grand Tour victories. Froome himself played a similar role in support of Bradley Wiggins during the 2012 Tour de France.

== Types of climbers ==
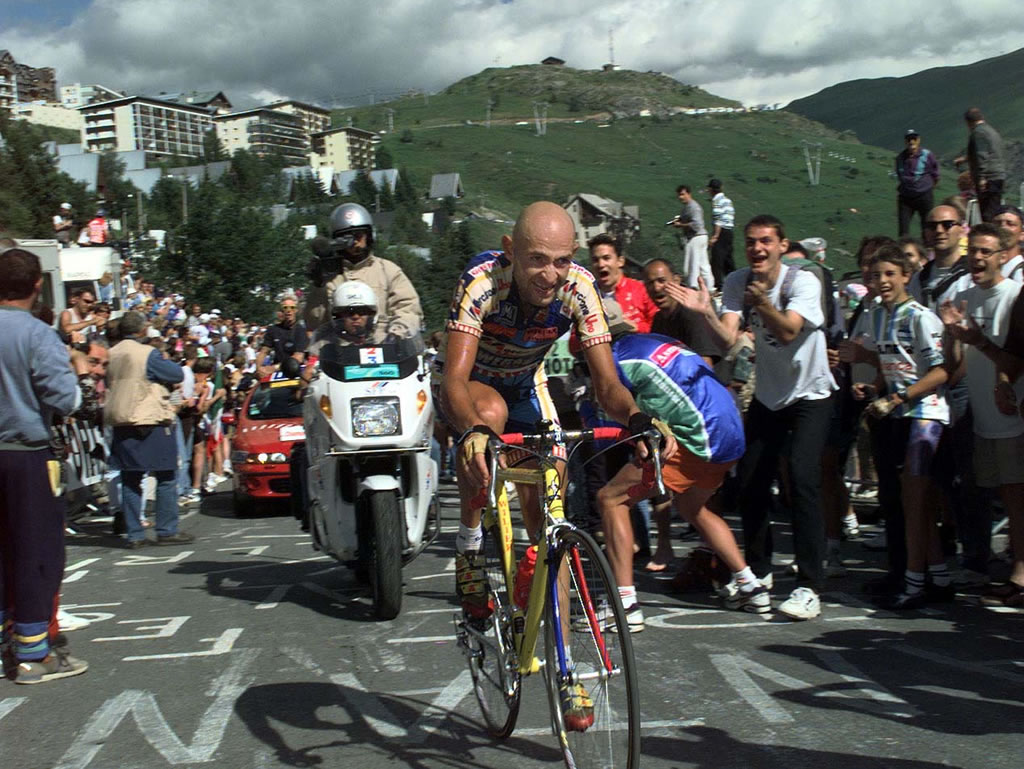
Marco Pantani is considered one of the all time greats at climbing

Climbers tend to have a lot of endurance and specifically developed muscles for long hard climbs. They also tend to have a slim, lightweight physique, but some can become good climbers through concerted training.

The most successful climbing specialists come in different shapes and specializations. Climbers with very small physique such as José Rujano (48 kg), Nairo Quintana (58 kg), Roberto Heras (60 kg), Alberto Contador (61 kg) and Gilberto Simoni (58 kg) thrive when the climbs reach dizzying heights and incredibly steep slopes where their low weight makes them more efficient and able to put in repeated acceleration runs. Their endurance also makes them good stage race specialists. Marco Pantani, champion of the 1998 Tour de France, was able to make attack after attack to quickly tire out his opponents.

Another type of rider or puncheur has a similarly small physique but possess more power which may provide an advantage in short but steep climbs in races including the Ardennes classics. Examples of such hills include the Mur de Huy in the Flèche Wallonne and the Cauberg in the Amstel Gold Race. Examples of such riders include Julian Alaphilippe, Philippe Gilbert, Paolo Bettini and Danilo Di Luca, who are able to sprint their way up the shorter climbs to win a stage or a single-day race. However, their lower endurance is a disadvantage in stage races where the climbs are usually longer, albeit at lower gradients. Many climbers cannot sprint very well because their relative small size does not allow them to match the strength of the bigger, more muscular sprinters.

The last type of climber is the breakaway specialist who can ride aggressively with many attacks and sustain their lead over ascents, descents, and flats. Famous examples include Laurent Jalabert and Richard Virenque both of whom earned their King of the Mountains jerseys in the Tour de France by day-long breakaways amassing points at every summit. Most notably, Laurent Jalabert started his career as a sprinter but later transformed himself into a different type of rider. Rafał Majka won the Polka Dot jersey at the 2014 Tour de France and 2016 Tour de France in a similar manner.

Many riders who are primarily time-trialists have also been able to compete in everything but the steepest climbs because of their good power-to-weight ratio. Tour de France winners Miguel Induráin, Jan Ullrich and Bradley Wiggins were primarily time-trialists but were also among the best in the mountain stages during the years in which they won the Tour de France. Also riders can build up a lead in the individual time trials and defend it during the mountain stages, Tom Dumoulin won the 2017 Giro d'Italia and Primož Roglič won the 2021 Vuelta a España by doing this.

== Climbing physics and physiology ==
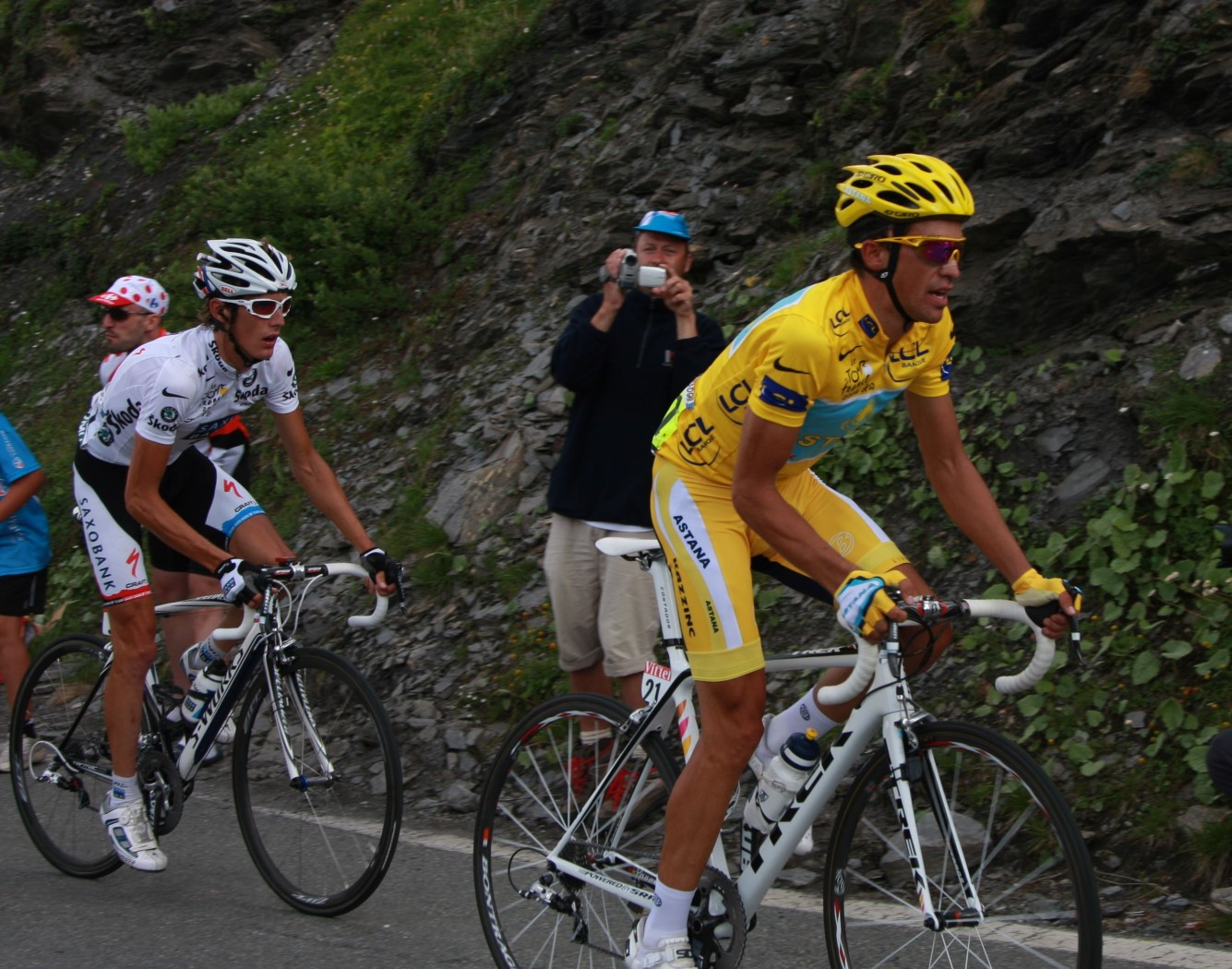
Alberto Contador wearing the yellow jersey leading Andy Schleck wearing the white jersey at the 2009 Tour de France.

Sports physiologists have attributed the advantage that small stature holds in cycling up steep ascents to the way in which body mass and body surface area scale according to height (see square–cube law). As a cyclist's height increases, the surface areas of their body increase according to the square of their height whereas the mass of their body increases according to the cube of their height. The surface area relation applies both to the total surface area of the body, and to the surface areas of the lungs and blood vessels, which are primary factors in determining aerobic power. Thus, an equally proportioned cyclist who is 50% heavier will generate only about 30% more aerobic power. On a steep climb, most of the cyclist's energy goes into lifting their own weight, so the heavier cyclist will be at a competitive disadvantage.

There is a lower limit to the benefit of small stature because, among other factors, the cyclist must also lift the weight of their bicycle. The additional power is proportional to the grade or slope of the road and the speed of the rider along the slope (or along the level line). For a 5% grade, each meter of road requires lifting the body weight by 5 cm. The power required is equal to the change in gravitational potential energy per unit time. For a 60 kilograms (130 lb) rider, the additional power needed is about 30 watts per meter/second of road speed (about 8 watts per km/hour).

Scaling factors also account for the relative disadvantage of the small cyclist in descending: a larger rider will be subject to a greater gravitational force because of their greater body mass. Additionally, as mentioned, the frontal area that creates aerodynamic drag increases only quadratically with the rider's size, and hence the larger rider would be expected to accelerate faster and attain a greater terminal velocity.

Although these factors might seem to cancel each other out, the climber still has an advantage on a course with long ascents and long descents: adding several miles per hour on a slow, time-consuming climb is much more valuable than the same increase on a fast and brief descent. Any rider can improve their climbing speed by increasing their aerobic power and reducing their body weight, and can increase their descending speed through better bike handling and the willingness to accept an increased risk of crashing. One of the few elite riders to use descending skill as a competitive advantage is Paolo Savoldelli.

== Bicycle technology ==
Recent advances in bicycle components give the rider a wider range of gearing choices, allowing climbing specialists to use lower gears to ascend optimally while still having the higher gears necessary to keep up with other riders in the flatter sections. Legendary climbers of the past such as Lucien Van Impe had to ride out of the saddle pushing high gears for hours at a time; climbers today are better able to match their gearing to the challenge and climb at a more reasonable cadence. The current UCI minimum limit for the mass of bicycles is 6.8 kilograms (15 lb). Although many bike manufacturers can create bikes much lighter than this, the UCI deems this weight fair in the spirit of preserving the 'primacy of man' over their equipment.

== King of the Mountains in stage races ==
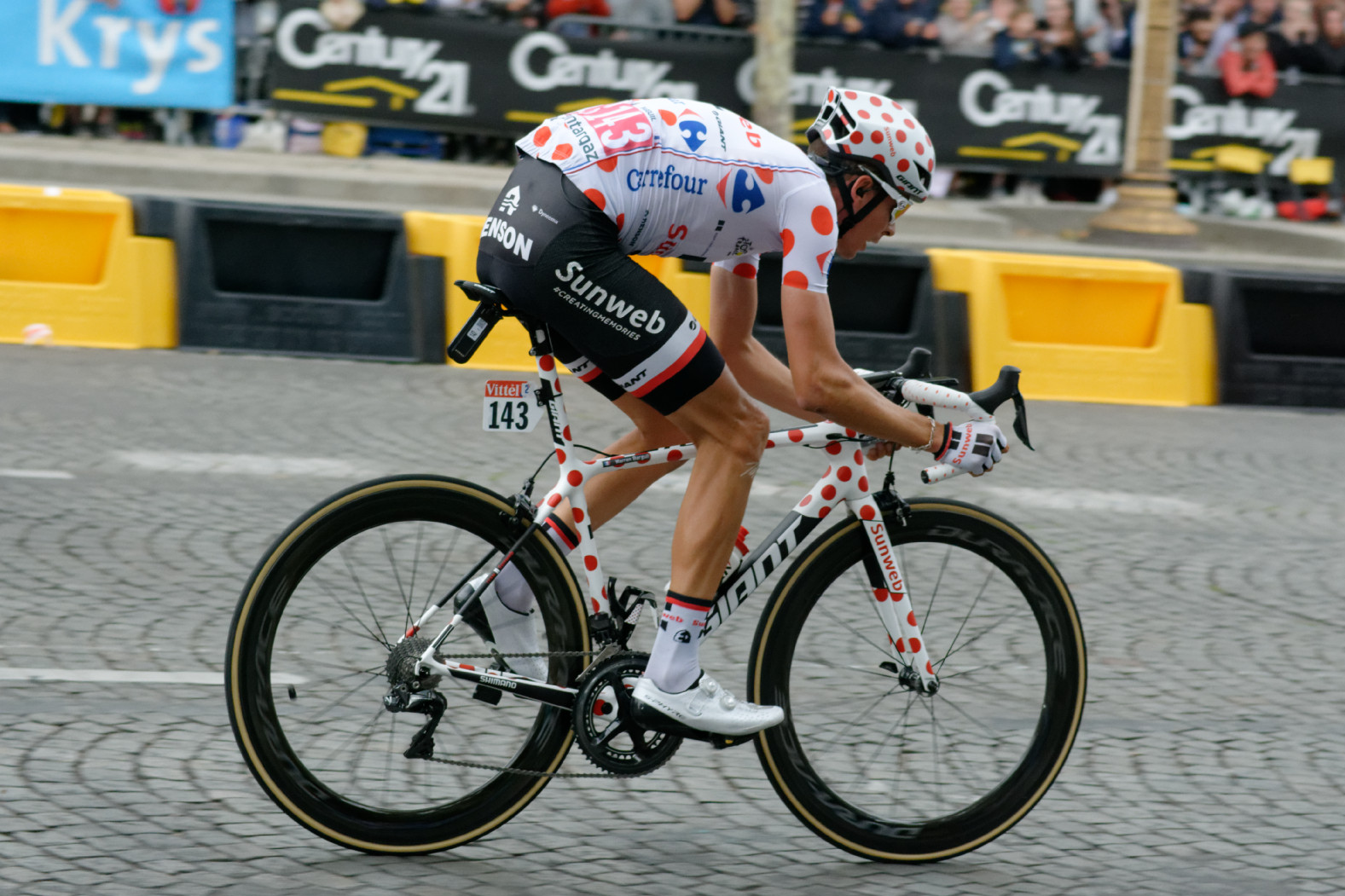
Warren Barguil in the polka dot jersey at the 2017 Tour de France

Most stage races have a special category for the best climber, usually by awarding points at the important summits of the race. In the Tour de France for example, the best climber, or "King of the Mountains", is awarded a red polka dot jersey (French: maillot à pois rouges). In the Giro d'Italia the best climber is awarded a blue jersey (Italian: maglia azzurra). In the Vuelta a España the best climber is awarded a blue polka dot jersey.

== Examples of climbers ==
=== Active riders ===
- (Belgium) Remco Evenepoel
- (Slovenia) Tadej Pogačar
- (Denmark) Jonas Vingegaard
- (United States) Sepp Kuss

=== Former riders ===
- (United States) Lance Armstrong
- (Portugal) José Azevedo
- (Spain) Federico Bahamontes
- (Italy) Ivan Basso
- (Italy) Gino Bartali
- (Spain) Alberto Contador
- (Italy) Fausto Coppi
- (Luxembourg) Charly Gaul
- (Spain) Roberto Heras
- (Colombia) Luis Herrera
- (France) Laurent Jalabert
- (Spain) Julio Jiménez
- (Poland) Rafał Majka
- (Italy) Vincenzo Nibali
- (Italy) Marco Pantani
- (Denmark) Michael Rasmussen
- (Spain) Joaquim Rodríguez
- (Luxembourg) Andy Schleck
- (Italy) Gilberto Simoni
- (Belgium) Lucien Van Impe
- (France) Richard Virenque
- (United Kingdom) Bradley Wiggins
