= Isidro Nozal =

Spanish cyclist

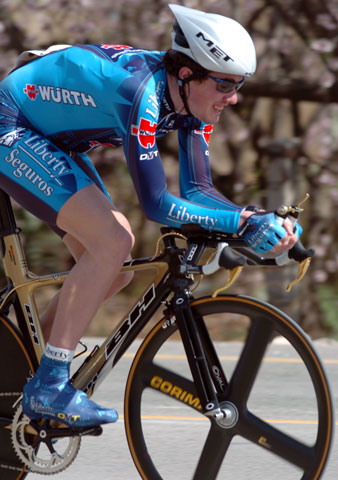

Personal information
- Full name: Isidro Nozal
- Born: 18 October 1977 (age 48) Barakaldo, Spain

Cycling career
- Sport: Cycling
- Discipline: Road
- Role: Rider

Professional teams
- 1999–2006: ONCE–Deutsche Bank
- 2007: Astana
- 2008–2009: Karpin–Galicia

Major wins
- Grand Tours Tour de France 1 TTT stage (2002) Vuelta a España 2 individual stages (2003) 1 TTT stage (2003)

Isidro Nozal Vega (born 18 October 1977) is a Spanish former professional road racing cyclist. Nozal was runner-up in the 2003 Vuelta a España and an instrumental domestique in Roberto Heras' 2004 Vuelta a España win.

== Doping ==
In 2005, Vega was suspended for two weeks after being tested with a hematocrit level above 50 before the start of Dauphine Libere. In 2006, he was initially implicated in the Operación Puerto doping case, but was cleared of any wrongdoing by Spanish officials. He later admitted his involvement, saying he did three blood transfusions with Fuentes in the season before the 2005 Dauphine Libere, but denying he doped. For the 2008 and 2009 seasons Nozal rode for the Portuguese Pro Continental team of Liberty Seguros. In September 2009 Nozal and two teammates (Nuno Ribeiro and Héctor Guerra) were announced to have tested positive for EPO-CERA in samples taken for the previous month's Tour of Portugal. Liberty Seguros immediately announced that it would cease sponsorship of the team and its participation in cycling. Ribeiro's win was withdrawn and the second-placed rider, Spain's David Blanco, was elevated to the overall win. Nozal, Ribeiro, and Guerra all received two-year suspensions from cycling.

== Career achievements ==
=== Major results ===
1998
7th Overall Circuito Montañés
1999
6th Overall Tour de Pologne
2000
1st Stage 1 (TTT) Volta a Catalunya
2001
6th Overall Vuelta Ciclista a la Rioja
2002
Tour de France

1st Stage 4 (TTT)
Held after Stages 4–8

4th Overall Vuelta a Castilla y León
7th Overall Deutschland Tour
7th Overall Vuelta a Burgos

1st Stage 3 (TTT)

7th Overall Vuelta a Asturias
8th Overall Clasica de Alcobendas

1st Stage 3 (ITT)

2003
2nd Overall Vuelta a España

1st Stages 1 (TTT), 6 (ITT) & 13 (ITT)
Held after Stages 4–19
Held after Stage 9
Held after Stages 4–9 & 12–14

4th Time trial, UCI Road World Championships
6th Overall Deutschland Tour
2004
7th Time trial, National Road Championships
7th Overall Vuelta a España
10th Subida al Naranco

=== Grand Tour general classification results timeline ===
Grand Tour	1999	2000	2001	2002	2003	2004	2005	2006	2007	2008	2009
Giro d'Italia	—	—	68	—	—	—	—	—	—	—	—
Tour de France	—	—	—	38	72	73	—	—	—	—	—
/ Vuelta a España	—	—	—	—	2	7	DNF	—	—	—	—

Legend
—	Did not compete
DNF	Did not finish
