= Julia (clairvoyant) =

Lady's maid of Queen Christina of Sweden

Julia (fl. 1689), was the lady's maid of Queen Christina of Sweden at her court in Rome. She was regarded as a clairvoyant and known for her predictions, and Christina referred to her as her Sibyl.

The most famous prediction of Julia was that of the death of Queen Christina. Shortly before her death, Christina was said to have appeared before Julia in a new dress, and asked her: "What am I thinking of?" Julia replied, "The Queen wishes to be buried in this beautiful dress", upon which Christina replied that this was indeed her wish, but that death was in the hands of fate. Julia responded by saying that Christina would be buried in that dress, and that Cardinal Decio Azzolino and Pope Innocent XI would follow shortly afterward in death. All this also happened as described.
