= Julia, West Virginia =

- Unincorporated community
- Location within West Virginia Location within the United States
- Coordinates: 38°01′28″N 80°18′14″W
- Country: United States
- State: West Virginia
- County: Greenbrier
- Elevation: 2,149 ft (655 m)
- Time zone: UTC-5 (Eastern (EST))
  - Summer (DST): UTC-4 (EDT)
- Area codes: 304 & 681
- GNIS feature ID: 1551618

Julia is an unincorporated community in Greenbrier County, West Virginia, United States. Julia is located on the Greenbrier River, 3.5 miles (5.6 km) northeast of Falling Spring.
