= Roberto Heras =

Spanish cyclist (born 1974)

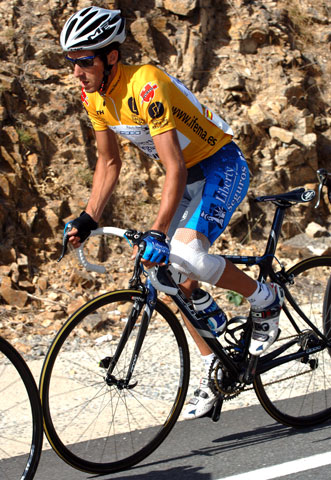
- Heras at the 2005 Vuelta a España

Personal information
- Full name: Roberto Heras Hernández
- Born: 1 February 1974 (age 52) Béjar, Spain
- Height: 1.72 m (5 ft 7 1/2 in)
- Weight: 59 kg (130 lb; 9 st 4 lb)

Cycling career
- Sport: Cycling
- Discipline: Road
- Role: Rider
- Rider type: Climbing specialist

Professional teams
- 1997–2000: Kelme–Costa Blanca
- 2001–2003: U.S. Postal Service
- 2004–2005: Liberty Seguros

Major wins
- Grand Tours Tour de France 1 TTT stage (2003) Giro d'Italia 1 individual stage (1999) Vuelta a España General classification (2000, 2003, 2004, 2005) Points classification (2000) Combination classification (2002, 2004) 10 individual stages (1997, 1998, 2000, 2002–2005) Stage races Volta a Catalunya (2002)

Roberto Heras Hernández (born 1 February 1974) is a Spanish former professional road bicycle racer who won the Vuelta a España a record four times. Between 1997 and 2005 he finished in the top 5 of the Vuelta every year except 1998 when he finished 6th. He won a record-tying three times, and then broke the record with a fourth win in 2005, but he was eventually disqualified after being accused of taking EPO. Heras chose to fight the accusations and this resulted in a lengthy court case and appeal process.

In June 2011, Heras successfully appealed the disqualification in the civil court of Castilla y León, and this decision was upheld in the Spanish supreme court in December 2012. The Spanish cycling federation subsequently reinstated Heras as 2005 Vuelta champion.

== Early career ==
Heras turned professional in 1995 for the Spanish cycling team Kelme. His first win as a pro came in 1996 in the Subida al Naranco. Later that year he won the 12th stage of the Vuelta a España. Next year he won another stage at the Vuelta and the Clásica de Amorebieta. In 1999 he won stages at the Volta a Catalunya and the Giro d'Italia, and he stood for the first time on the Vuelta's podium, third despite not winning a stage. In 2000 he took two stages and the overall win, which attracted the US Postal cycling team.

== Riding with Lance Armstrong ==
From 2001, he raced alongside Lance Armstrong on the US Postal Service team. As a climbing specialist, he assisted Armstrong in the mountain stages of the Tour de France. Heras achieved his highest position in the Tour when he finished fifth in 2000.

During the 2002 Tour de France Lance Armstrong was in 2nd place overall going into stage 11 where the race entered the high mountains. Going up the final climb on the Tourmalet Heras set such a dominating pace at the front of the fragmented Peloton that all of Armstrong's rivals were dropped with the exception of Joseba Beloki. The ride put in by Heras set up Armstrong to take over the Yellow Jersey from the ONCE–Eroski team led by Beloki, Abraham Olano and Igor González de Galdeano who was in the overall lead at the start of Stage 11. Beloki finished 2nd overall in the stage as Heras came in 3rd with both riders behind Armstrong who finally launched his attack for the stage win. The next day in Stage 12 once again Roberto Heras set such a furious pace on the final climb that all of Armstrong's rivals were dropped with the exception of Beloki except this time it was Heras who crossed in 2nd while Beloki took third.

== Dominating the Vuelta a España ==
He had, however, already established himself as a contender for honours in other Tours. He was fifth and a stage winner in the 1997 Vuelta, sixth (and another stage victory) a year later, and third in 1999; that year he finished sixth and won a stage in the Giro d'Italia. His first Vuelta win came in 2000 (when he also won two stages and the points classification), and he won again in 2003.

At the end of 2003, he left US Postal to lead the Spanish Liberty Seguros team. He was thought to be a contender for the 2004 Tour de France but abandoned after the 16th stage due to lack of fitness. Heras entered the Vuelta a España and won, equalling Tony Rominger's record three wins. During the first mountain stages, it seemed an easy win but in the last week he had a challenge from Santiago Pérez.

In the 2005 Vuelta a España, Heras won two mountain stages (including the Estación de Esquí de Pajares) and lost the last time trial by less than a second, something nobody expected from the non-time-trial-specialist Heras. Heras won for the fourth time, a record.

However, a drug test in November 2005, two months after the race, showed a positive test for EPO from the day of time trial (stage 20). Heras was fired and faced a two-year suspension. His Vuelta win was given to second-place finisher, Russian Denis Menchov.

Heras appealed, alleging inaccuracies in the testing and mishandling of his samples. He appealed this decision in the civil court of Castilla y León, and was successful. The Spanish cycling federation appealed at the Spanish supreme court, but in December 2012 this court upheld the decision; the Spanish cycling federation subsequently reinstated Heras as 2005 champion and Heras went on to sue the federation for over one million euro in purported lost earnings. In January 2016, Heras was awarded €724,000 in compensation from the Spanish state, a sentence that was confirmed on 9 May 2017.

== Career achievements ==
=== Major results ===
1996
10th Klasika Primavera de Amorebieta
1997
1st Subida al Naranco
3rd Clásica a los Puertos de Guadarrama
5th Overall Vuelta a España

1st Stage 12

8th Overall Vuelta a Murcia
9th Overall Setmana Catalana de Ciclisme
1998
1st Klasika Primavera de Amorebieta
2nd Subida al Naranco
3rd Clásica a los Puertos de Guadarrama
4th Trofeo Forla de Navarra
5th Overall Vuelta a La Rioja
6th Overall Vuelta a España

1st Stage 19

6th Overall Vuelta a Asturias
8th Overall Vuelta a Aragón
10th Overall Paris–Nice
10th Overall Setmana Catalana de Ciclisme
1999
1st Klasika Primavera de Amorebieta
2nd Road race, National Road Championships
2nd Overall Volta a Catalunya

1st Stage 6

2nd Gran Premio de Llodio
3rd Overall Vuelta a España
5th Overall Giro d'Italia

1st Stage 21

5th Overall Tour of Galicia
2000
1st Overall Vuelta a España

1st Points classification
1st Stages 7 & 20

1st Stage 5 Euskal Bizikleta
3rd Overall Vuelta a La Rioja
3rd Klasika Primavera de Amorebieta
3rd Clásica a los Puertos de Guadarrama
5th Overall Tour de France
5th Overall Tour of Galicia
6th Overall Vuelta a Asturias
2001
2nd Overall Vuelta a Aragón
4th Overall Vuelta a España
2002
1st Overall Volta a Catalunya

1st Stage 1 (TTT)

2nd Overall Vuelta a España

1st Combination classification
1st Stages 6 & 15
Held after Stages 15–20
Held after Stage 18

8th Overall Vuelta a Burgos
9th Overall Tour de France
2003
1st Overall Vuelta a España

1st Stage 20

1st Stage 4 (TTT) Tour de France
2nd Overall Volta a Catalunya
2004
1st Overall Vuelta a España

1st Combination classification
1st Stage 12
Held after Stages 12–16

1st Overall Euskal Bizikleta
5th Overall Clásica Internacional de Alcobendas
2005
1st Overall Vuelta a España

1st Stages 6 & 15
Held after Stages 15–20
Held after Stage 6
Held after Stages 6–8

9th Overall Setmana Catalana de Ciclisme
2009
1st Brompton World Championships

=== Grand Tour general classification results timeline ===
Grand Tour	1997	1998	1999	2000	2001	2002	2003	2004	2005
Giro d'Italia	—	—	5	—	—	—	—	—	—
Tour de France	—	—	—	5	15	9	34	DNF	45
/ Vuelta a España	5	6	3	1	4	2	1	1	1

Legend
—	Did not compete
DNF	Did not finish

== See also ==
- List of doping cases in cycling
- List of sportspeople sanctioned for doping offences
