= Maiboza =

Town of ancient Lydia

Coordinates: 38°42′38″N 27°54′53″E

Maiboza, also called Iulia or Julia, was a town of ancient Lydia. The name Maiboza does not occur among ancient authors, but is inferred from epigraphic and other evidence.

Its site is located near Gölmarmara in Asiatic Turkey.
