= Floyd Landis =

American cyclist (born 1975)

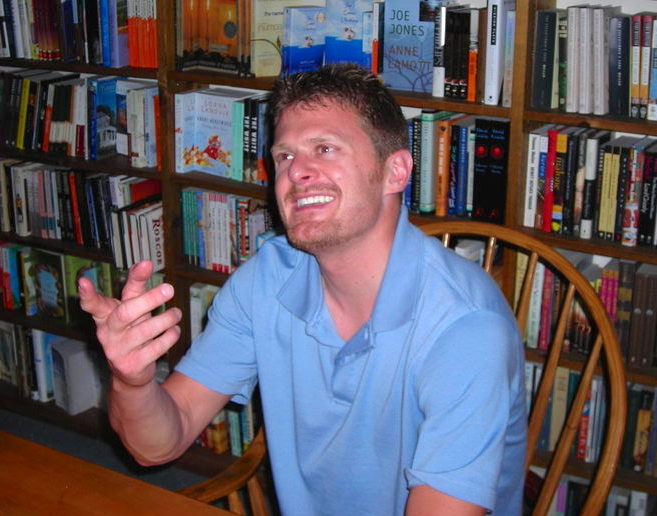
- Landis in 2009

Personal information
- Full name: Floyd Landis
- Born: October 14, 1975 (age 51) Farmersville, Pennsylvania, U.S.
- Height: 1.78 m (5 ft 10 in)
- Weight: 68 kg (150 lb)

Cycling career
- Sport: Cycling
- Discipline: Road
- Role: Rider
- Rider type: All-rounder

Professional teams
- 1999–2001: Mercury
- 2002–2004: U.S. Postal Service
- 2005–2006: Phonak
- 2009: OUCH–Maxxis
- 2010: Bahati Foundation

Major wins
- Grand Tours Tour de France 2 TTT stages (2003, 2004) Vuelta a España 1 TTT stage (2004) Stage races Paris–Nice (2006) Tour of California (2006)

Floyd Landis (born October 14, 1975) is an American former professional road racing cyclist. After beginning his professional road career with the Mercury Cycling Team in 1999, he rode for the U.S. Postal Service team from 2002 to 2004, serving as a domestique for Lance Armstrong, and then joined Phonak Hearing Systems. His major results included overall victories in the Tour de Georgia, Tour of California, and Paris–Nice. He initially finished first in the 2006 Tour de France, but was disqualified following a positive doping test, and Óscar Pereiro was declared the official winner.

Landis denied doping and contested the case, but in 2007 an arbitration panel found that he had committed a doping violation and imposed a two-year suspension. The Court of Arbitration for Sport upheld the ruling in 2008. He returned to competition in 2009 but was unable to secure a team after the 2010 season and retired in January 2011.

In May 2010, after years of denying that he had doped, Landis admitted using performance-enhancing drugs during his career and accused several former teammates, including Armstrong, of doping. He later brought a federal False Claims Act whistleblower lawsuit alleging that Armstrong and others had defrauded the United States government through the U.S. Postal Service team's sponsorship. The U.S. Department of Justice joined the case in 2013; it was settled in 2018 when Armstrong agreed to pay the government $5 million, with Landis receiving $1.1 million for his role as whistleblower.

== Early life and education ==
Landis is the son of Arlene Landis and Paul Landis, a truck driver and small business owner in Farmersville, Pennsylvania. He is the oldest of six children. He was raised in a devout Mennonite family and community. When he was a teenager, he would ride with a friend down to the Conestoga River. He purchased his first bike, a neon-green and orange Marin Muirwoods, for $300 when he was 15.

He entered local bike shop races and won. He wore sweatpants during the races because his religion forbade wearing traditional cycling shorts. His father was displeased with his son's investment in cycling, and tried to discourage him from racing his bike by giving him extra chores. This left him no time to train during the day, so he would sneak out of the house at night to train, sometimes at 1 or 2 a.m. and often in the freezing cold. When he was the age of 18, Landis won the junior national cross country race held in Traverse City, Michigan.

Landis graduated from Conestoga Valley High School in Lancaster, Pennsylvania, in 1994.

== Career ==
=== Master of the Mountains ===
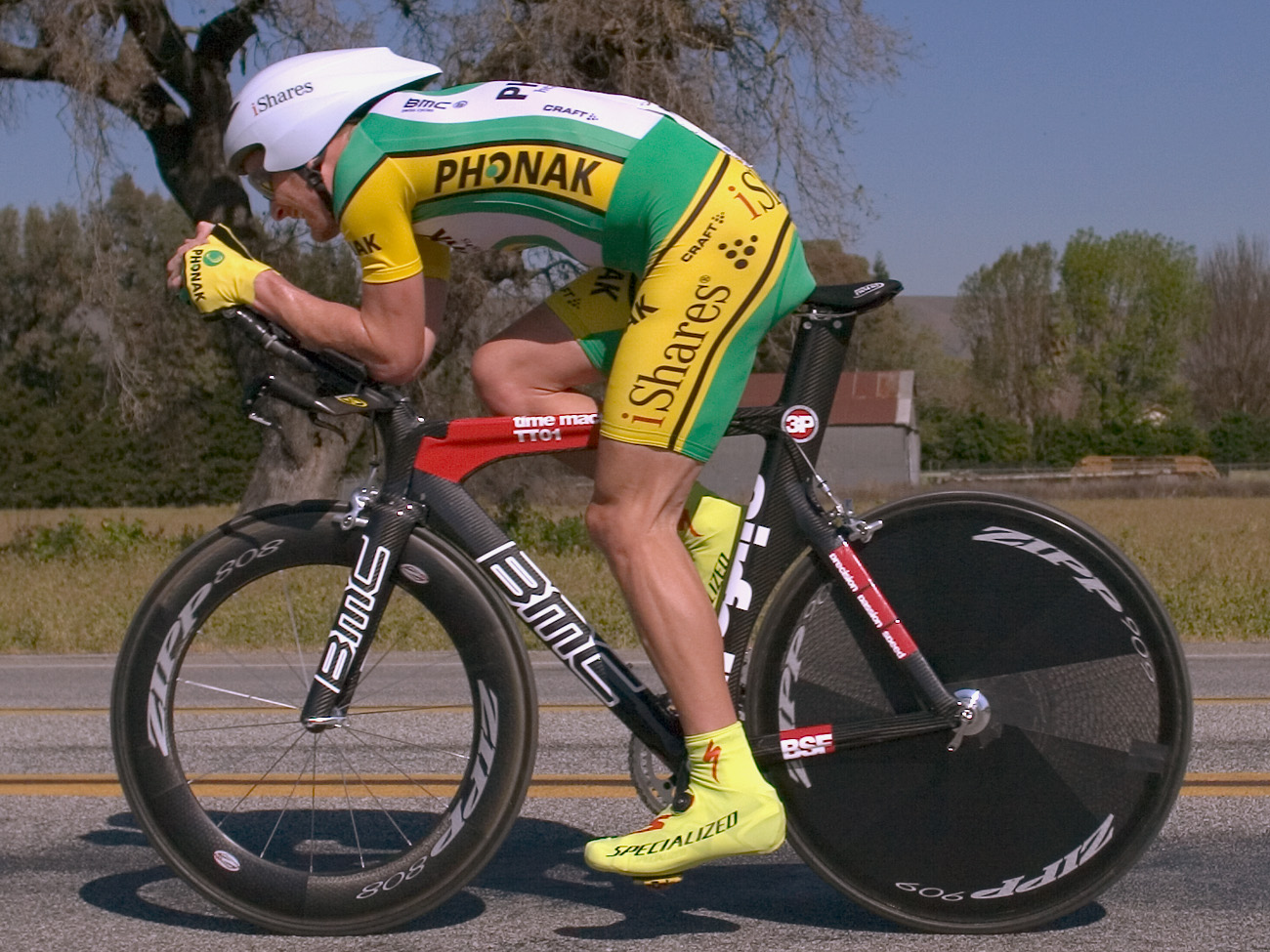
Landis at the 2006 Tour of California

Landis won the first mountain bike race he entered. In 1993, he was crowned U.S. junior national champion. He told friends he would win the Tour de France one day. At the age of 20 Landis moved to Southern California to train full-time as a mountain biker. He soon established a reputation for toughness, once finishing a race riding on only his rims. However, his training regimen resembled that of a road biker, and in 1999 he switched to road cycling.

Landis performed well enough on the road that Lance Armstrong recruited him to U.S. Postal and chose Landis to ride alongside him as a domestique during his Tour participations from 2002 to 2004. In each of these Tours, Landis served as Armstrong's lieutenant, or chief domestique, pushing the pace in the mountains to break the pack before Armstrong took off on his own to win the stage. In the 2004 tour Landis led Armstrong and a few of Armstrong's main rivals over the final climb of stage 17, putting on such an impressive display of strength that actor and avid bike-racing fan Robin Williams dubbed him the "Mofo of the Mountains". His performance led some observers to peg him as a possible team leader and future winner of the Maillot Jaune. Landis left U.S. Postal later that year after receiving a better contract offer from the Phonak squad.

In the 2005 Tour de France, Landis finished ninth overall in the General classification, his highest finish in the tour at that time. Landis started the 2006 season strongly, with overall wins in the Amgen Tour of California, and then in the prestigious Paris–Nice, both week-long stage races. Winning Paris–Nice gave Landis 52 points in the UCI ProTour individual competition, starting him off in first place for 2006. Landis achieved another overall win in the Ford Tour de Georgia, which took place from April 18 to 23. In addition to winning the Tour de Georgia time trial. Landis retained his lead through the mountains with a close second-place finish to Tom Danielson on Brasstown Bald.

=== Hip ailment ===
Landis' performance up to stage 16 of the 2006 Tour and his comeback in stage 17 were particularly noteworthy given his hip ailment, osteonecrosis, which was revealed in an article in The New York Times during the race. This deterioration in the ball joint of his right hip stemmed from diminished blood supply and constricted blood vessels caused by scar tissue. The original injury that led to the formation of the scar tissue was a femoral neck fracture sustained in a bicycle crash during a training ride near his Southern California home in October 2002. Landis kept the ailment secret from his teammates, rivals, and the media until an announcement was made while the 2006 Tour was underway. This same ailment also affected former multi-sport athlete Bo Jackson and American football player Brett Favre.

Landis rode the 2006 Tour with constant pain from the injury, saying "It's bad, it's grinding, it's bone rubbing on bone. Sometimes it's a sharp pain. When I pedal and walk, it comes and goes, but mostly it's an ache, like an arthritis pain. It aches down my leg into my knee. The morning is the best time, it doesn't hurt too much. But when I walk it hurts, when I ride it hurts. Most of the time it doesn't keep me awake, but there are nights that it does." During the Tour he was medically approved to take cortisone for this injury, a medication otherwise prohibited in professional cycling for its known potential for abuse. He called his first place in the General Classification "a triumph of persistence" despite the pain. He was stripped of his win on September 20, 2006.

Landis underwent hip resurfacing on September 27, 2006, receiving a Smith and Nephew Birmingham metal-on-metal hip joint.

=== Doping case: 2006–2007 ===
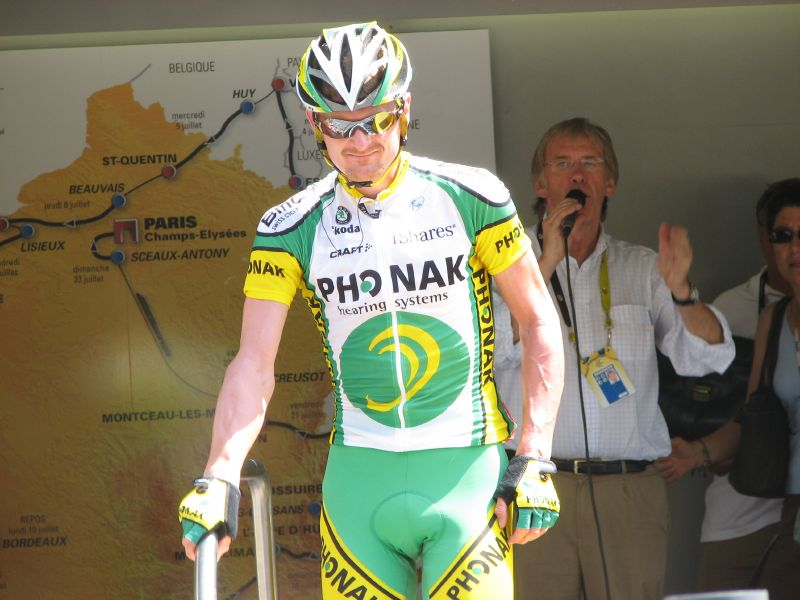
Landis in 2006

On July 27, 2006, the Phonak Cycling Team announced a urine sample submitted by Landis tested positive for an unusually high ratio of the hormone testosterone to the hormone epitestosterone (T/E ratio) after his performance in stage 17 of the 2006 Tour de France. Landis denied doping and placed faith in a test using his backup sample. Phonak stated that he would be dismissed should the backup sample also test positive. It did, and Landis was suspended from professional cycling and dismissed from his team. Landis's personal physician later disclosed that the test had found a T/E ratio of 11:1 in Landis, far above the maximum allowable ratio of 4:1.

The test on Landis's stage 17 A sample had been performed by the French government's anti-doping clinical laboratory, the National Laboratory for Doping Detection (LNDD). LNDD is a division of the Ministry of Youth, Sport, and Social Life and is accredited by the World Anti-Doping Agency (WADA). In early August, Landis was found guilty of doping and was disqualified. Second place rider Óscar Pereiro became the race's official winner. The decision of whether to strip Landis of his title was made by the International Cycling Union (UCI). Under UCI rules, the determination of whether a cyclist violated any rules must be made by the cyclist's national federation, in this case USA Cycling, which transferred the case to the United States Anti-Doping Agency (USADA).

David Witt, a close personal friend who introduced Landis to his future wife (the daughter of Witt's then girlfriend and future wife), shot himself with a handgun in the North Park community of San Diego on August 15, 2006. Landis and Witt met as roommates in 1998 when Landis moved to San Diego. Witt and Landis shared the same cycling coach, and Witt was instrumental in Landis's transition from mountain biking to road bicycle racing. Witt and his wife attended the 2006 Tour de France and were in Paris with Landis to celebrate his victory. Witt's North Park restaurant was adorned with Landis memorabilia, including two of Landis's jerseys. The San Diego Union-Tribune reported that a Landis family spokesman read the following from a statement: "Floyd, Amber and the family are devastated by the news of David's death. They loved him dearly, and they miss him. [The Landises] hope their privacy is respected in this time of mourning." Many years later, Landis claimed that Witt may have killed himself because of his knowledge of Landis's doping practices. In a 2010 ESPN interview, Landis acknowledged that Witt knew about Landis doping and said, "I'm not saying that's the reason he's dead, but without that, I don't see why he wouldn't still be here." Even before the USADA's ruling on the matter, the controversy resulted in the disbandment of Landis's former team Phonak.

On September 20, 2007, Landis was found guilty of doping by a 2–1 vote of the hearing committee, with Patrice Brunet and Richard McLaren in the majority, and Christopher Campbell dissenting. Landis was banned from the sport for two years, dated retroactively to January 2007. Landis appealed the decision of the committee to the Court of Arbitration for Sport (CAS). The hearing ran from March 19 to 24, 2008, in New York City. The decision was announced on June 30, 2008, with the result that the conviction and ban were upheld. In September 2008, Landis moved in U.S. federal court to vacate the CAS arbitration award, contending that the procurement of the award was tainted by partiality and conflicts of interest. Landis contested the $100,000 U.S. "costs" award, characterizing it as a disguised punitive award. The parties agreed to dismiss the case with prejudice in December 2008, ending the litigation surrounding the doping case.

On April 14, 2009, the French newspaper L'Express reported information that had been obtained from hacking into the French national laboratory for doping detection. The information was sent to a Canadian counterpart lab from a computer registered to Arnie Baker, Landis's ex-coach. On August 25, 2009, The New York Times reported, "No evidence has surfaced to connect Mr. Landis or Dr. Baker to the hacking, and each has denied any involvement." However, on February 15, 2010, it became known that a French judge issued an arrest warrant for Landis on the hacking charge in late January.

During 2006 and 2007, Landis is believed to have raised about $1 million from the "Floyd Fairness Fund", established by businessman Thom Weisel. He appealed to supporters to donate "anything they could" to help him pay his reportedly $2 million legal bill, while denying his involvement in doping. Landis reached an agreement with federal prosecutors over allegations that he fraudulently solicited donations for a defense fund he set up to fight doping charges. He appeared before a federal judge on August 24, 2012, for a "deferred prosecution" hearing at which he agreed to pay restitution.

=== Return to cycling ===
After his two-year ban ended in early 2009, Landis returned to cycling with the OUCH Pro Cycling Team, a U.S. team that races domestically. His first race following his suspension and his first race as a member of the OUCH team was the 2009 Tour of California, in which he finished 23rd out of a field of 84 riders. Landis left the OUCH team at the end of 2009, stating he wished to ride the longer, tougher stage races offered in Europe and internationally that better suit his strengths. He then raced the Tour of Southland in New Zealand in November 2009, with local team CyclingNZshop.com-Bio Sport, finishing 17th overall out of a field of 95 riders. For the 2010 season, he joined the Bahati Foundation Pro Cycling Team. However, after Landis admitted to doping himself and accused many other prominent American cyclists of doping, the Bahati Team began to fall apart, and Landis competed in the July 2010, Cascade Cycling Classic in Bend, Oregon, as a lone rider without a team. Landis was unable to find a team in the next months, and in January 2011, decided to end his career.

=== Doping accusations and admission: 2010 ===
On May 20, 2010, midway through the 2010 Amgen Tour of California and despite his previous vehement denials, The Wall Street Journal reported that Landis had sent a series of emails to senior cycling and anti-doping officials in which he admitted to doping from June 2002 through his victory in the 2006 Tour de France. It was also reported that Landis and his coach Dr. Brent Kay sent emails to Tour of California director Andrew Messick. Landis had asked Messick to be allowed last-minute entry to the 2010 race; when Messick refused, Landis released his allegations regarding cycling to the media. He accused several former teammates, including Lance Armstrong and George Hincapie, of using EPO and blood transfusions in the 2002 and 2003 seasons. Landis also claims there was blood doping at the 2004 Tour de France.

Armstrong and Team RadioShack maintained that Landis and his coach had asked for a spot on Team RadioShack, and Landis went public with the allegations only after being denied a contract. Landis also alleged that he assisted Levi Leipheimer and Dave Zabriskie in taking EPO before the Tour of California one year. In an ESPN interview that day, Landis steadfastly denied that he had used synthetic testosterone during the 2006 Tour de France, but admitted to using human growth hormone and other doping modalities. The 2006 Tour de France was the only race to produce evidence Landis had ever used banned substances. Landis admitted that he had no physical evidence to support his allegations of others' involvement in doping, but that his emails were intended to clear his mind.

Landis stated that Armstrong told him in 2002 that U.S. Postal Service Pro Cycling Team director Johan Bruyneel had made a "financial arrangement" with the International Cycling Union (UCI) to ensure that details of a positive test on Armstrong remained confidential. Pat McQuaid, the president of UCI, who had received copies of Landis' emails, said that Landis's allegations were "completely untrue", that Landis was "seeking revenge," and that UCI had "made contact with a lawyer and will take appropriate action."

Bruyneel "absolutely denied everything Landis said" and noted that several people "have had the story for a few weeks but didn't give it any credibility" and that Landis was "angry at the world" for the collapse of his career following his conviction. Olympic medalist Steve Hegg said he felt "betrayed" and "deceived" and characterized Landis as "a bitter guy." David Millar, who served a two-year suspension for EPO doping from 2004 to 2006 and is on the Garmin–Transitions team, said: "If [Landis] had stood up and manned up four years ago, he'd be racing the Tour de France now. He'd have a different book out. He'd have not lost a penny. He'd be admired by young people. He would have a different life ahead of him ...". Both the World Anti-Doping Agency and the U.S. government began investigating Landis's accusations. The U.S. case investigation was led by Jeff Novitzky, a special agent with the U.S. Food and Drug Administration, and Doug Miller, an experienced federal prosecutor, both of whom were part of the BALCO investigative team.

Landis filed a federal whistleblower lawsuit against Armstrong under the federal False Claims Act, where he alleged that Armstrong and team managers defrauded the U.S. government when they accepted money from the U.S. Postal Service (USPS). In February 2013, the United States Department of Justice joined the whistleblower lawsuit, which also accused former USPS team director Johan Bruyneel and Tailwind Sports, the firm that managed the USPS team, of defrauding the U.S. In February 2017, the court determined that the federal government's US$100 million civil lawsuit against Armstrong, started by Landis, would proceed to trial. The matter was settled in April 2018 when Armstrong agreed to pay the United States Government US$5 million. It was reported that Landis would receive US$1.1 million as a result of his whistleblower actions.

=== Post-cycling career ===
In July 2011, Landis gave an interview to Graham Bensinger in which he described his plans and training to race professionally in NASCAR.

In November 2011, Landis and his former coach, Arnie Baker, were convicted of "benefiting from" hacking into the computers of the Châtenay-Malabry anti-doping lab. Both received 12-month suspended sentences. In April 2012, it was revealed that Landis was under investigation by federal prosecutors in connection with possible wire and mail fraud committed when he raised his legal defense fund in 2007. In August 2012, Landis admitted to fraud, and was ordered to pay US$487,000 in restitution. He reached a deal to avoid being prosecuted for the fraud charges as long as he paid the restitution.

Landis is portrayed by American actor Jesse Plemons in the 2015 film The Program, directed by Stephen Frears and starring Ben Foster as Lance Armstrong and Chris O'Dowd as David Walsh.

He opened a cannabis company in Colorado in mid-2016.

Landis' 2006 Tour de France attack gained new attention at the 2018 Giro d'Italia, when Chris Froome's race-clinching long-range solo breakaway on Stage 19 of the 2018 Giro d'Italia was described by fellow rider George Bennett immediately after the stage as "doing a Landis".

In October 2018, Landis announced that he would launch a new UCI Continental cycling team sponsored by his cannabis business. He indicated that funding for the team would come from the bulk of the money he received from the settlement of the Lance Armstrong whistleblower lawsuit, and that it would be managed by Gord Fraser. In November 2019 Landis announced the team would be folding after one year of operation.

== Career achievements ==
=== Major results ===
1998
1st National Under–23 Mountain Bike Championships
5th Sea Otter Classic
1999
2nd Overall Cascade Cycling Classic

1st Stage 1

3rd Overall Tour de l'Avenir
5th Overall Tour de Beauce
2000
1st Overall Tour du Poitou-Charentes

1st Young rider classification

4th Overall Tour de l'Avenir
5th Overall Tour de Langkawi

1st Stage 1 (ITT)

9th Overall Redlands Classic
2002
2nd Overall Critérium du Dauphiné Libéré
5th Overall Circuit de la Sarthe
9th Eddy Merckx Grand Prix
2003
1st Stage 4 (TTT) Tour de France
2004
1st Overall Volta ao Algarve

1st Stage 5

1st Stage 4 (TTT) Tour de France
Vuelta a España

1st Stage 1 (TTT)
Held after Stages 1 & 8–11
Held after Stage 1
Held after Stages 1–4
Held after Stages 1–5 & 8

7th Overall Tour of the Basque Country
8th Overall Critérium International
2005
1st Overall Tour de Georgia

1st Stage 3 (ITT)

1st Stage 1 (TTT) Volta a Catalunya
2nd Eindhoven Team Time Trial
9th Overall Tour de France
2006

Voided results from July–August

~~1st Overall Tour de France~~

~~1st Stage 17~~

1st Overall Paris–Nice
1st Overall Tour of California

1st Stage 3 (ITT)

1st Overall Tour de Georgia

1st Stage 3 (ITT)

2010
2nd Tour of the Battenkill
4th Overall Tour of Southland

=== Grand Tour general classification results timeline ===
Grand Tour	2002	2003	2004	2005	2006
Giro d'Italia	—	—	—	—	—
Tour de France	61	77	23	9	~~1~~
Vuelta a España	—	76	DNF	DNF	—

Legend
—	Did not compete
DNF	Did not finish
~~No.~~	Voided result

== See also ==
- List of doping cases in cycling
