= Benoît Joachim =

Luxembourgish cyclist (born 1976)

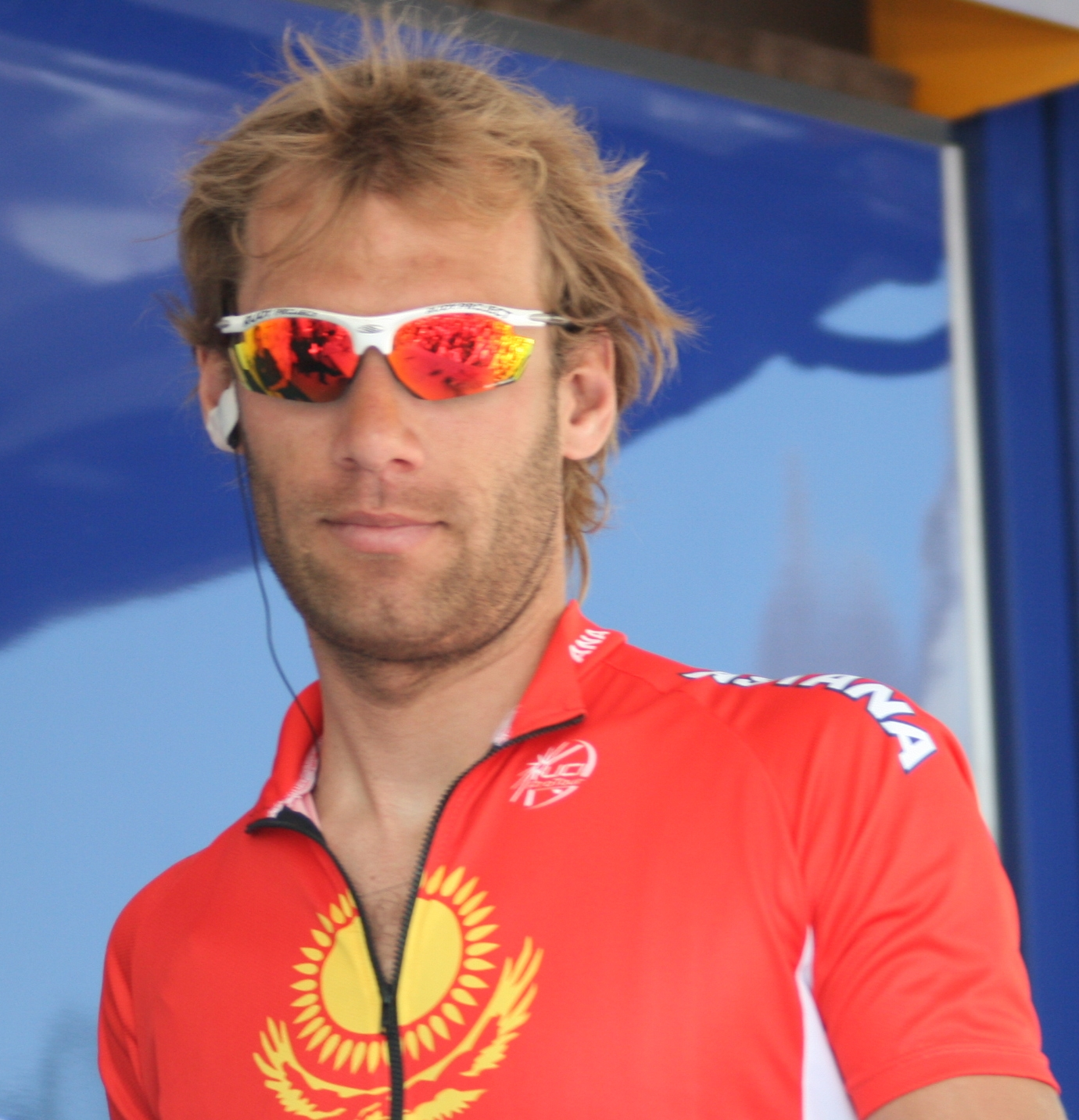

Personal information
- Born: 14 January 1976 (age 50) Luxembourg City, Luxembourg

Cycling career
- Sport: Cycling
- Discipline: Road
- Role: Rider

Professional teams
- 1999–2006: Us Postal service / Discovery Channel
- 2007–2008: Astana
- 2009: Differdange

Benoît Joachim (born 14 January 1976) is a retired professional road racing cyclist from Luxembourg.

== Biography ==
Joachim started his professional career at the age of 18 for a small Italian cycling team, Sonego Sport. After racing with them for three months, he was noticed by the bigger, De Nardi who were interesting him. After riding with De Nardi for 3 years, he joined the Us Postal Pro Cycling Team and rode as a super-domestique for the team. He has competed in eleven Grand Tours, including the Tour de France (2000, 2002), the Giro d'Italia (2005, 2006, 2007), and the Vuelta a España (1999, 2001, 2003, 2004, 2005, 2006). His career highlight is becoming crowned many Luxembourg National Road Race Champion titles and Luxembourg National Time Trial Champion. In addition, Joachim became the first Luxembourger to wear the race leader's golden jersey at the 2004 Vuelta a España. Joachim wore the jersey for two days. In 2007, Joachim transferred to the Astana outfit, but left them after two seasons, and rode for Differdange during 2009. At the end of the season, he ended his professional career.

His younger brother Aurélien is a Luxembourgish international footballer.

== Major results ==
1998
1st stage Tour de L'avenir
1999
PruTour
1st Stage 1
2nd overall

2000
1st – National Road Race Championship
2nd overall – Tour de Luxembourg
2004
1st – National Time Trial Championship
9th overall – Tour de Wallonie
1st stage 1 (TTT) Tour of Spain
General classification leader (Stages 3 and 4) – Vuelta a España
24th Time trial Olympic Games in Athens
2005
7th, Prologue – Tour of Benelux
2006
1st – National Time Trial Championship
2007
1st – National Road Race Championship

== Grand Tour results ==
=== Tour de France ===
2 participations

- 2000 : 92nd
- 2002 : 89th

=== Giro d'Italia ===
3 participations

- 2005 : 107th
- 2006 : 83rd
- 2007 : 99th

=== Vuelta a España ===
6 participations

- 1999 : abandon
- 2001 : 42nd
- 2003 : 59th
- 2004 : 57th, golden jersey during 2 days
- 2005 : non-runner at the 13th stage
- 2006 : 66th
