= José Julia =

Spanish cyclist

José Juliá
Personal information
- Full name: José Cayetano Juliá Cegarro
- Born: 1 July 1979 (age 47) Cieza, Murcia, Spain

Cycling career
- Sport: Cycling
- Discipline: Road
- Role: Rider

Professional teams
- 2002–2004: Kelme–Costa Blanca
- 2005–2006: Illes Balears–Banesto

Major wins
- Grand Tours Vuelta a España 1 individual stage (2004)

José Cayetano Juliá Cegarro (born 1 July 1979) is a retired Spanish cyclist. He rode in three Grand Tours in his career, and won stage 16 of the 2004 Vuelta a España to Cáceres, winning from a breakaway. His only other professional career win was the third stage in the 2004 Volta a Portugal.
