= Ángel Gómez (cyclist) =

Spanish cyclist

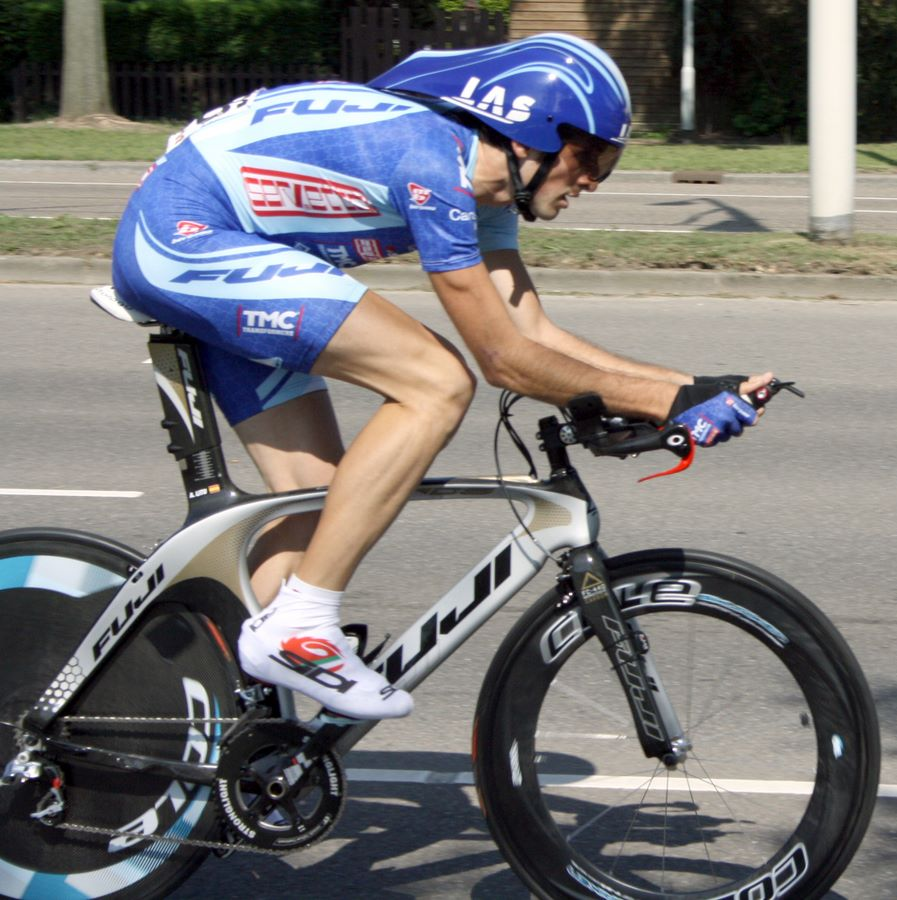

Personal information
- Full name: Ángel Gómez Gómez
- Nickname: Litu
- Born: 13 May 1981 (age 45) Ucieda, Spain
- Height: 1.83 m (6 ft 0 in)
- Weight: 68 kg (150 lb)

Cycling career
- Sport: Cycling
- Discipline: Road
- Role: Rider

Professional team
- 2004–2009: Saunier Duval–Prodir

Ángel Gómez Gómez (born 13 May 1981 in Ucieda, Cantabria) is a Spanish professional road bicycle racer. He has yet to record any professional victories.

== Major results ==
- Vuelta a Valladolid - 1 stage & Overall (2003)
- Circuito Montañés - 1 stage (2003)
