= Manuel Beltrán =

Spanish cyclist (born 1971)

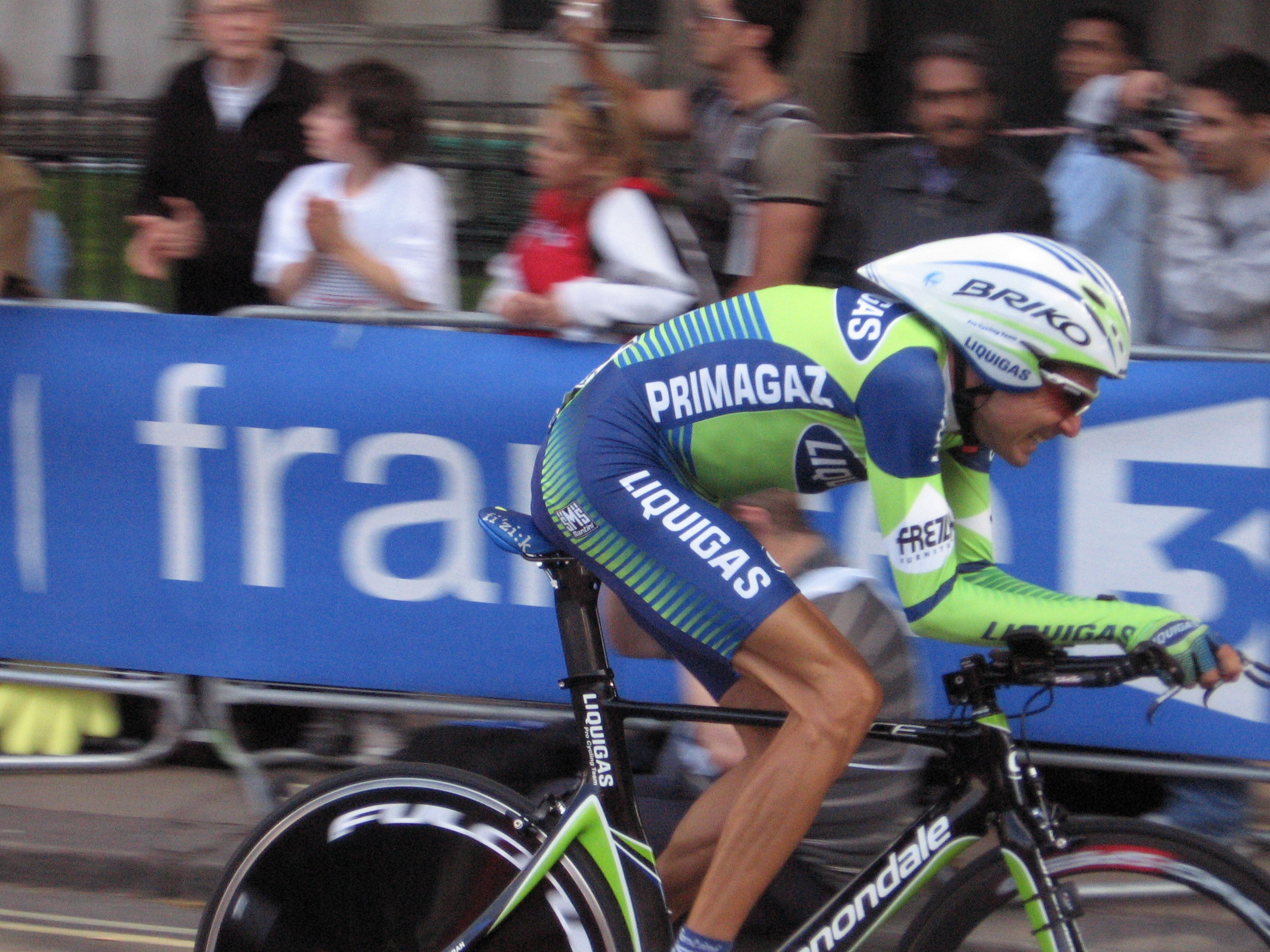

Personal information
- Full name: Manuel Beltrán Martinez
- Nicknames: Triki, The Cookie Monster
- Born: 28 May 1971 (age 55) Jaén, Spain
- Height: 1.78 m (5 ft 10 in)
- Weight: 60 kg (132 lb; 9 st 6 lb)

Cycling career
- Sport: Cycling
- Discipline: Road
- Role: Rider
- Rider type: Climbing specialist

Professional teams
- 1994–1996: Mapei–CLAS
- 1997–1999: Banesto
- 2000–2001: Mapei–Quick-Step
- 2002–2003: Team Coast
- 2003–2006: U.S. Postal Service
- 2007–2008: Liquigas

Major wins
- Grand Tours Tour de France 3 TTT stages (2003, 2004, 2005) Vuelta a España 1 TTT stage (2004) Stage races Volta a Catalunya (1999)

Manuel Beltrán Martinez (born 28 May 1971) is a former professional road bicycle racer from Spain. His finishes in the Tour de France are somewhat misleading as he was a lieutenant for his team leader. He was the team leader for numerous Vuelta a España rides and performed well.

Beltrán tested positive for EPO after the first stage of the 2008 Tour de France, according to L'Équipe 11 July 2008. The same date as the news broke, a spokesman for his team Liquigas said he would be suspended from the team and thrown out of that year's tour. It was later confirmed that his B-sample also tested positive.

Beltrán was suspended for two years. In 2010, he had to pay his former team 100.000 euros because of his positive doping test in the Tour de France.

His name was also on the list of doping tests published by the French Senate on 24 July 2013 that were collected during the 1998 Tour de France and found positive for EPO when retested in 2004.

== Career achievements ==
=== Major results ===
1996
10th Overall Tour de Romandie
1997
4th Overall Vuelta a Aragón
8th Overall Vuelta a Andalucía
10th Overall Critérium du Dauphiné Libéré
10th Overall Vuelta a Murcia
1998
5th Overall Vuelta a Aragón
6th Overall Vuelta a Burgos
7th Overall Vuelta a Asturias
10th Overall Vuelta a Murcia
1999
1st Overall Volta a Catalunya

1st Stage 7 (ITT)

4th Overall Vuelta a Asturias
5th Overall Euskal Bizikleta
7th Overall Vuelta a España
10th Overall Vuelta a Burgos
2000
5th Overall Volta a Catalunya
6th Overall Vuelta a Burgos
2001
3rd Overall Vuelta a Castilla y León
3rd Overall Setmana Catalana de Ciclisme
5th Prueba Villafranca de Ordizia
8th Overall Tour de Suisse
2002
2nd Memorial Manuel Galera
3rd Overall Escalada a Montjuïc
5th Japan Cup
9th Overall Vuelta a España
9th Overall Vuelta a Andalucía
2003
1st Stage 4 (TTT) Tour de France
3rd Overall Vuelta a Aragón
6th Overall Vuelta a España
2004
Vuelta a España

1st Stage 1 (TTT)
Held after Stages 5–7

1st Stage 4 (TTT) Tour de France
10th La Flèche Wallonne
10th Klasika Primavera
2005
1st Stage 4 (TTT) Tour de France
6th Overall Vuelta a Andalucía
8th Overall Tour de Romandie
2006
4th Overall Tour de l'Ain
9th Overall Vuelta a España
10th Overall Vuelta a Andalucía
2007
1st Stage 2 Tour of the Basque Country
8th Overall Critérium du Dauphiné Libéré
9th Overall Vuelta a Castilla y León
9th Overall Vuelta a España

=== Grand Tour general classification results timeline ===
Grand Tour	1996	1997	1998	1999	2000	2001	2002	2003	2004	2005	2006	2007	2008
Giro d'Italia	28	—	—	—	—	DNF	52	—	—	—	22	—	—
Tour de France	—	14	DNF	DNF	11	—	—	14	46	DNF	—	17	DNF
Vuelta a España	—	—	13	7	DNF	19	9	6	13	DNF	9	9	—

Legend
—	Did not compete
DNF	Did not finish

== See also ==
- List of doping cases in cycling
