= Jorge Ferrío =

Spanish cyclist

Personal information
- Full name: Jorge Ferrío Luque
- Born: 24 August 1976 (age 50) Madrid, Spain

Cycling career
- Sport: Cycling
- Current team: Retired
- Discipline: Road
- Role: Rider

Amateur teams
- 1998: Banesto Amateur
- 1998: Banesto (stagiaire)
- 1999–2000: Tegui Videoporteros
- 1999: Maia–CIN (stagiaire)
- 2001: Super Froiz

Professional teams
- 2002–2004: Jazztel–Costa de Almería
- 2005: Spiuk
- 2006: 3 Molinos Resort
- 2007: Andalucía–Cajasur

Jorge Ferrío Luque (born 24 August 1976 in Madrid) is a Spanish former cyclist.

== Major results ==
2004
1st Clásica a los Puertos de Guadarrama
1st Mountains classification Vuelta a la Rioja
6th Trofeo Luis Puig
8th Overall Escalada a Montjuïc
8th Overall Vuelta a Aragón
8th Gran Premio Miguel Induráin
10th Overall 2004 Tour of the Basque Country
2005
1st Stage 2 Vuelta a La Rioja
1st Stage 5 Volta a Portugal
2nd GP Llodio
5th Overall Troféu Joaquim Agostinho
6th Overall Vuelta a Castilla y León
8th Klasika Primavera
8th Overall Setmana Catalana de Ciclisme
10th Overall Vuelta Asturias
2006
7th Overall Clásica Internacional de Alcobendas
2007
8th Trofeo Sóller
9th Overall Vuelta Asturias
