= 2006 Giro d'Italia, Stage 12 to Stage 21 =

Cycling race stages

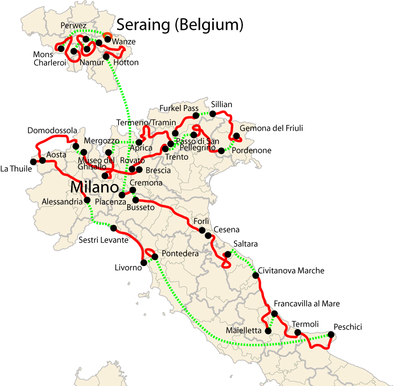
Overview of the stages; red lines represent distances covered in the individual stages, while green lines are the distances between the stages

The 2006 Giro d'Italia was the 89th edition of the Giro d'Italia, one of cycling's Grand Tours. The Giro began in Seraing, Belgium with an individual time trial on 6 May, and Stage 12 occurred on 19 May with an undulating stage from Livorno. The race finished in Milan on 28 May.

== Stage 12 ==
19 May 2006 - Livorno to Sestri Levante, 169 km (105 mi)

Stage 12 result

Rank	Rider	Team	Time
1	Joan Horrach (ESP)	Caisse d'Epargne–Illes Balears	3h 55' 53"
2	Addy Engels (NED)	Quick-Step–Innergetic	+ 5"
3	Emanuele Sella (ITA)	Ceramica Panaria–Navigare	+ 5"
4	Manuele Mori (ITA)	Saunier Duval–Prodir	+ 5"
5	Fortunato Baliani (ITA)	Ceramica Panaria–Navigare	+ 5"
6	Wladimir Belli (ITA)	Selle Italia–Diquigiovanni	+ 5"
7	Sven Krauß (GER)	Gerolsteiner	+ 1' 03"
8	Alberto Ongarato (ITA)	Team Milram	+ 1' 03"
9	Jörg Ludewig (GER)	T-Mobile Team	+ 1' 03"
10	Manuel Beltrán (ESP)	Discovery Channel	+ 1' 03"

General classification after stage 12

Rank	Rider	Team	Time
1	Ivan Basso (ITA)	Team CSC	44h 31' 52"
2	José Enrique Gutiérrez (ESP)	Phonak	+ 2' 48"
3	Paolo Savoldelli (ITA)	Discovery Channel	+ 3' 26"
4	Emanuele Sella (ITA)	Ceramica Panaria–Navigare	+ 4' 21"
5	Wladimir Belli (ITA)	Selle Italia–Diquigiovanni	+ 5' 31"
6	Tom Danielson (USA)	Discovery Channel	+ 5' 38"
7	Manuel Beltrán (ESP)	Discovery Channel	+ 6' 36"
8	Franco Pellizotti (ITA)	Liquigas	+ 6' 37"
9	Víctor Hugo Peña (COL)	Phonak	+ 6' 54"
10	Damiano Cunego (ITA)	Lampre–Fondital	+ 6' 54"

== Stage 13 ==
20 May 2006 - Alessandria to La Thuile, 218 km (135 mi)

Stage 13 result

Rank	Rider	Team	Time
1	Leonardo Piepoli (ITA)	Saunier Duval–Prodir	5h 21' 12"
2	Ivan Basso (ITA)	Team CSC	+ 44"
3	José Enrique Gutiérrez (ESP)	Phonak	+ 1' 19"
4	Gilberto Simoni (ITA)	Saunier Duval–Prodir	+ 1' 19"
5	Michele Scarponi (ITA)	Liberty Seguros–Würth	+ 2' 09"
6	Franco Pellizotti (ITA)	Liquigas	+ 2' 09"
7	John Gadret (FRA)	AG2R Prévoyance	+ 2' 13"
8	Julio Perez Cuapio (MEX)	Ceramica Panaria–Navigare	+ 2' 18"
9	Damiano Cunego (ITA)	Lampre–Fondital	+ 2' 36"
10	Paolo Savoldelli (ITA)	Discovery Channel	+ 2' 36"

General classification after stage 13

Rank	Rider	Team	Time
1	Ivan Basso (ITA)	Team CSC	49h 53' 36"
2	José Enrique Gutiérrez (ESP)	Phonak	+ 3' 27"
3	Paolo Savoldelli (ITA)	Discovery Channel	+ 5' 30"
4	Wladimir Belli (ITA)	Selle Italia–Diquigiovanni	+ 7' 35"
5	Gilberto Simoni (ITA)	Saunier Duval–Prodir	+ 8' 00"
6	Franco Pellizotti (ITA)	Liquigas	+ 8' 14"
7	Tom Danielson (USA)	Discovery Channel	+ 8' 35"
8	Damiano Cunego (ITA)	Lampre–Fondital	+ 8' 58"
9	Danilo Di Luca (ITA)	Liquigas	+ 10' 36"
10	Víctor Hugo Peña (COL)	Phonak	+ 11' 12"

== Stage 14 ==
21 May 2006 - Aosta to Domodossola, 220 km (140 mi)

Stage 14 result

Rank	Rider	Team	Time
1	Luis Felipe Laverde (COL)	Ceramica Panaria–Navigare	5h 27' 05"
2	Francisco Pérez Sanchez (ESP)	Caisse d'Epargne–Illes Balears	+ 0"
3	Paolo Tiralongo (ITA)	Lampre–Fondital	+ 7"
4	Stefan Schumacher (GER)	Gerolsteiner	+ 7"
5	Raffaele Illiano (ITA)	Team Milram	+ 7"
6	Fortunato Baliani (ITA)	Ceramica Panaria–Navigare	+ 7"
7	Sandy Casar (FRA)	Française des Jeux	+ 7"
8	Iker Flores (ESP)	Euskaltel–Euskadi	+ 7"
9	Steve Zampieri (SUI)	Phonak	+ 7"
10	Johann Tschopp (SUI)	Phonak	+ 7"

General classification after stage 14

Rank	Rider	Team	Time
1	Ivan Basso (ITA)	Team CSC	55h 28' 25"
2	José Enrique Gutiérrez (ESP)	Phonak	+ 3' 27"
3	Paolo Savoldelli (ITA)	Discovery Channel	+ 5' 30"
4	Wladimir Belli (ITA)	Selle Italia–Diquigiovanni	+ 7' 35"
5	Gilberto Simoni (ITA)	Saunier Duval–Prodir	+ 8' 00"
6	Sandy Casar (FRA)	Française des Jeux	+ 8' 01"
7	Franco Pellizotti (ITA)	Liquigas	+ 8' 14"
8	Tom Danielson (USA)	Discovery Channel	+ 8' 35"
9	Damiano Cunego (ITA)	Lampre–Fondital	+ 8' 58"
10	Danilo Di Luca (ITA)	Liquigas	+ 10' 36"

== Stage 15 ==
22 May 2006 - Mergozzo to Brescia, 190 km (120 mi)

Stage 15 result

Rank	Rider	Team	Time
1	Paolo Bettini (ITA)	Quick-Step–Innergetic	4h 15' 42"
2	Olaf Pollack (GER)	T-Mobile Team	+ 0"
3	Robert Forster (GER)	Gerolsteiner	+ 0"
4	Henk Vogels (AUS)	Davitamon–Lotto	+ 0"
5	Maximiliano Richeze (ARG)	Ceramica Panaria–Navigare	+ 0"
6	Fabrizio Guidi (ITA)	Phonak	+ 0"
7	Leonardo Duque (COL)	Cofidis	+ 0"
8	Alberto Loddo (ITA)	Team Milram	+ 0"
9	Carlos Da Cruz (FRA)	Française des Jeux	+ 0"
10	Gorazd Štangelj (SLO)	Lampre–Fondital	+ 0"

General classification after stage 15

Rank	Rider	Team	Time
1	Ivan Basso (ITA)	Team CSC	59h 44' 07"
2	José Enrique Gutiérrez (ESP)	Phonak	+ 3' 27"
3	Paolo Savoldelli (ITA)	Discovery Channel	+ 5' 30"
4	Wladimir Belli (ITA)	Selle Italia–Diquigiovanni	+ 7' 35"
5	Gilberto Simoni (ITA)	Saunier Duval–Prodir	+ 8' 00"
6	Sandy Casar (FRA)	Française des Jeux	+ 8' 01"
7	Franco Pellizotti (ITA)	Liquigas	+ 8' 14"
8	Tom Danielson (USA)	Discovery Channel	+ 8' 35"
9	Damiano Cunego (ITA)	Lampre–Fondital	+ 8' 58"
10	Danilo Di Luca (ITA)	Liquigas	+ 10' 36"

== Stage 16 ==
23 May 2006 - Rovato to Trento, 168 km (104 mi)

Stage 16 result

Rank	Rider	Team	Time
1	Ivan Basso (ITA)	Team CSC	4h 51' 30"
2	Gilberto Simoni (ITA)	Saunier Duval–Prodir	+ 1' 26"
3	Leonardo Piepoli (ITA)	Saunier Duval–Prodir	+ 1' 37"
4	José Enrique Gutiérrez (ESP)	Phonak	+ 1' 37"
5	John Gadret (FRA)	AG2R Prévoyance	+ 2' 40"
6	Julio Alberto Pérez (MEX)	Ceramica Panaria–Navigare	+ 2' 45"
7	Wladimir Belli (ITA)	Selle Italia–Diquigiovanni	+ 3' 12"
8	Franco Pellizotti (ITA)	Liquigas	+ 3' 25"
9	Giampaolo Caruso (ITA)	Liberty Seguros–Würth	+ 3' 27"
10	David López Garcia (ESP)	Euskaltel–Euskadi	+ 3' 27"

General classification after stage 16

Rank	Rider	Team	Time
1	Ivan Basso (ITA)	Team CSC	64h 35' 17"
2	José Enrique Gutiérrez (ESP)	Phonak	+ 5' 24"
3	Paolo Savoldelli (ITA)	Discovery Channel	+ 9' 17"
4	Gilberto Simoni (ITA)	Saunier Duval–Prodir	+ 9' 34"
5	Wladimir Belli (ITA)	Selle Italia–Diquigiovanni	+ 11' 07"
6	Franco Pellizotti (ITA)	Liquigas	+ 11' 59"
7	Sandy Casar (FRA)	Française des Jeux	+ 12' 40"
8	Damiano Cunego (ITA)	Lampre–Fondital	+ 13' 35"
9	Víctor Hugo Peña (COL)	Phonak	+ 14' 59"
10	Danilo Di Luca (ITA)	Liquigas	+ 15' 18"

== Stage 17 ==
24 May 2006 - Tramin to Plan de Corones, 115 km (71 mi)

Stage 17 result

Rank	Rider	Team	Time
1	Leonardo Piepoli (ITA)	Saunier Duval–Prodir	3h 21' 26"
2	Ivan Basso (ITA)	Team CSC	+ 0"
3	José Enrique Gutiérrez (ESP)	Phonak	+ 15"
4	Franco Pellizotti (ITA)	Liquigas	+ 19"
5	Julio Alberto Pérez (MEX)	Ceramica Panaria–Navigare	+ 28"
6	John Gadret (FRA)	AG2R Prévoyance	+ 37"
7	Damiano Cunego (ITA)	Lampre–Fondital	+ 41"
8	Gilberto Simoni (ITA)	Saunier Duval–Prodir	+ 48"
9	Sergio Ghisalberti (ITA)	Team Milram	+ 58"
10	Giampaolo Caruso (ITA)	Liberty Seguros–Würth	+ 58"

General classification after stage 17

Rank	Rider	Team	Time
1	Ivan Basso (ITA)	Team CSC	67h 56' 31"
2	José Enrique Gutiérrez (ESP)	Phonak	+ 5' 43"
3	Gilberto Simoni (ITA)	Saunier Duval–Prodir	+ 10' 34"
4	Paolo Savoldelli (ITA)	Discovery Channel	+ 10' 58"
5	Franco Pellizotti (ITA)	Liquigas	+ 12' 30"
6	Wladimir Belli (ITA)	Selle Italia–Diquigiovanni	+ 13' 00"
7	Sandy Casar (FRA)	Française des Jeux	+ 14' 06"
8	Damiano Cunego (ITA)	Lampre–Fondital	+ 14' 48"
9	Víctor Hugo Peña (COL)	Phonak	+ 16' 40"
10	José Luis Rubiera (ESP)	Discovery Channel	+ 17' 48"

== Stage 18 ==
25 May 2006 - Sillian to Gemona del Friuli, 207 km (129 mi)

Stage 18 result

Rank	Rider	Team	Time
1	Stefan Schumacher (GER)	Gerolsteiner	5h 31' 33"
2	Marzio Bruseghin (ITA)	Lampre–Fondital	+ 0"
3	Iván Gutiérrez (ESP)	Caisse d'Epargne–Illes Balears	+ 0"
4	David López Garcia (ESP)	Euskaltel–Euskadi	+ 2"
5	Charly Wegelius (GBR)	Liquigas	+ 7"
6	Paolo Bettini (ITA)	Quick-Step–Innergetic	+ 2' 13"
7	Alberto Ongarato (ITA)	Team Milram	+ 2' 13"
8	Matthew White (AUS)	Discovery Channel	+ 2' 13"
9	José Enrique Gutiérrez (ESP)	Phonak	+ 2' 13"
10	Paolo Tiralongo (ITA)	Lampre–Fondital	+ 2' 13"

General classification after stage 18

Rank	Rider	Team	Time
1	Ivan Basso (ITA)	Team CSC	73h 30' 47"
2	José Enrique Gutiérrez (ESP)	Phonak	+ 5' 43"
3	Gilberto Simoni (ITA)	Saunier Duval–Prodir	+ 10' 34"
4	Paolo Savoldelli (ITA)	Discovery Channel	+ 10' 58"
5	Franco Pellizotti (ITA)	Liquigas	+ 12' 30"
6	Wladimir Belli (ITA)	Selle Italia–Diquigiovanni	+ 13' 00"
7	Sandy Casar (FRA)	Française des Jeux	+ 14' 06"
8	Damiano Cunego (ITA)	Lampre–Fondital	+ 14' 48"
9	Víctor Hugo Peña (COL)	Phonak	+ 16' 40"
10	José Luis Rubiera (ESP)	Discovery Channel	+ 17' 48"

== Stage 19 ==
26 May 2006 - Pordenone to San Pellegrino Pass, 224 km (139 mi)

Stage 19 result

Rank	Rider	Team	Time
1	Juan Manuel Gárate (ESP)	Quick-Step–Innergetic	7h 13' 36"
2	Jens Voigt (GER)	Team CSC	+ 4"
3	Francisco Vila Errandonea (ESP)	Lampre–Fondital	+ 1' 21"
4	Tadej Valjavec (SLO)	Lampre–Fondital	+ 1' 55"
5	Emanuele Sella (ITA)	Ceramica Panaria–Navigare	+ 2' 06"
6	Iván Parra (COL)	Cofidis	+ 2' 06"
7	Gilberto Simoni (ITA)	Saunier Duval–Prodir	+ 2' 15"
8	Ivan Basso (ITA)	Team CSC	+ 2' 15"
9	Johann Tschopp (SUI)	Phonak	+ 2' 15"
10	Danilo Di Luca (ITA)	Liquigas	+ 2' 19"

General classification after stage 19

Rank	Rider	Team	Time
1	Ivan Basso (ITA)	Team CSC	80h 46' 38"
2	José Enrique Gutiérrez (ESP)	Phonak	+ 6' 07"
3	Gilberto Simoni (ITA)	Saunier Duval–Prodir	+ 10' 34"
4	Paolo Savoldelli (ITA)	Discovery Channel	+ 12' 59"
5	Damiano Cunego (ITA)	Lampre–Fondital	+ 15' 13"
6	Franco Pellizotti (ITA)	Liquigas	+ 15' 26"
7	Sandy Casar (FRA)	Française des Jeux	+ 16' 07"
8	Juan Manuel Gárate (ESP)	Quick-Step–Innergetic	+ 16' 40"
9	Wladimir Belli (ITA)	Selle Italia–Diquigiovanni	+ 17' 23"
10	Danilo Di Luca (ITA)	Liquigas	+ 18' 31"

== Stage 20 ==
27 May 2006 - Trento to Aprica, 211 km (131 mi)

Stage 20 result

Rank	Rider	Team	Time
1	Ivan Basso (ITA)	Team CSC	6h 51' 15"
2	Gilberto Simoni (ITA)	Saunier Duval–Prodir	+ 1' 17"
3	Damiano Cunego (ITA)	Lampre–Fondital	+ 2' 51"
4	José Enrique Gutiérrez (ESP)	Phonak	+ 2' 51"
5	Paolo Savoldelli (ITA)	Discovery Channel	+ 6' 03"
6	Leonardo Piepoli (ITA)	Saunier Duval–Prodir	+ 6' 03"
7	Sandy Casar (FRA)	Française des Jeux	+ 7' 26"
8	Juan Manuel Gárate (ESP)	Quick-Step–Innergetic	+ 7' 26"
9	Víctor Hugo Peña (COL)	Phonak	+ 7' 26"
10	Giampaolo Caruso (ITA)	Liberty Seguros–Würth	+ 7' 26"

General classification after stage 20

Rank	Rider	Team	Time
1	Ivan Basso (ITA)	Team CSC	87h 37' 33"
2	José Enrique Gutiérrez (ESP)	Phonak	+ 9' 18"
3	Gilberto Simoni (ITA)	Saunier Duval–Prodir	+ 11' 59"
4	Damiano Cunego (ITA)	Lampre–Fondital	+ 18' 16"
5	Paolo Savoldelli (ITA)	Discovery Channel	+ 19' 22"
6	Sandy Casar (FRA)	Française des Jeux	+ 23' 53"
7	Juan Manuel Gárate (ESP)	Quick-Step–Innergetic	+ 24' 26"
8	Franco Pellizotti (ITA)	Liquigas	+ 25' 57"
9	Víctor Hugo Peña (COL)	Phonak	+ 26' 27"
10	Francisco Vila Errandonea (ESP)	Lampre–Fondital	+ 27' 34"

== Stage 21 ==
28 May 2006 - Museo del Ghisallo to Milan, 140 km (87 mi)

Stage 21 result

Rank	Rider	Team	Time
1	Robert Förster (GER)	Gerolsteiner	3h 56' 03"
2	Maximiliano Richeze (ARG)	Ceramica Panaria–Navigare	+ 0"
3	Olaf Pollack (GER)	T-Mobile Team	+ 0"
4	Paolo Bettini (ITA)	Quick-Step–Innergetic	+ 0"
5	Leonardo Duque (COL)	Cofidis	+ 0"
6	Elia Rigotto (ITA)	Team Milram	+ 0"
7	Yuriy Krivtsov (UKR)	AG2R Prévoyance	+ 0"
8	Sven Krauß (GER)	Gerolsteiner	+ 0"
9	Renaud Dion (FRA)	AG2R Prévoyance	+ 0"
10	Koen de Kort (NED)	Liberty Seguros–Würth	+ 0"

General classification after stage 21

Rank	Rider	Team	Time
1	Ivan Basso (ITA)	Team CSC	91h 33' 36"
2	José Enrique Gutiérrez (ESP)	Phonak	+ 9' 18"
3	Gilberto Simoni (ITA)	Saunier Duval–Prodir	+ 11' 59"
4	Damiano Cunego (ITA)	Lampre–Fondital	+ 18' 16"
5	Paolo Savoldelli (ITA)	Discovery Channel	+ 19' 22"
6	Sandy Casar (FRA)	Française des Jeux	+ 23' 53"
7	Juan Manuel Gárate (ESP)	Quick-Step–Innergetic	+ 24' 26"
8	Franco Pellizotti (ITA)	Liquigas	+ 25' 57"
9	Víctor Hugo Peña (COL)	Phonak	+ 26' 27"
10	Francisco Vila Errandonea (ESP)	Lampre–Fondital	+ 27' 34"
