= Madonna del Ghisallo =

Hill and church in Lombardy, Italy

Coordinates: 45.925428°N 9.268187°E

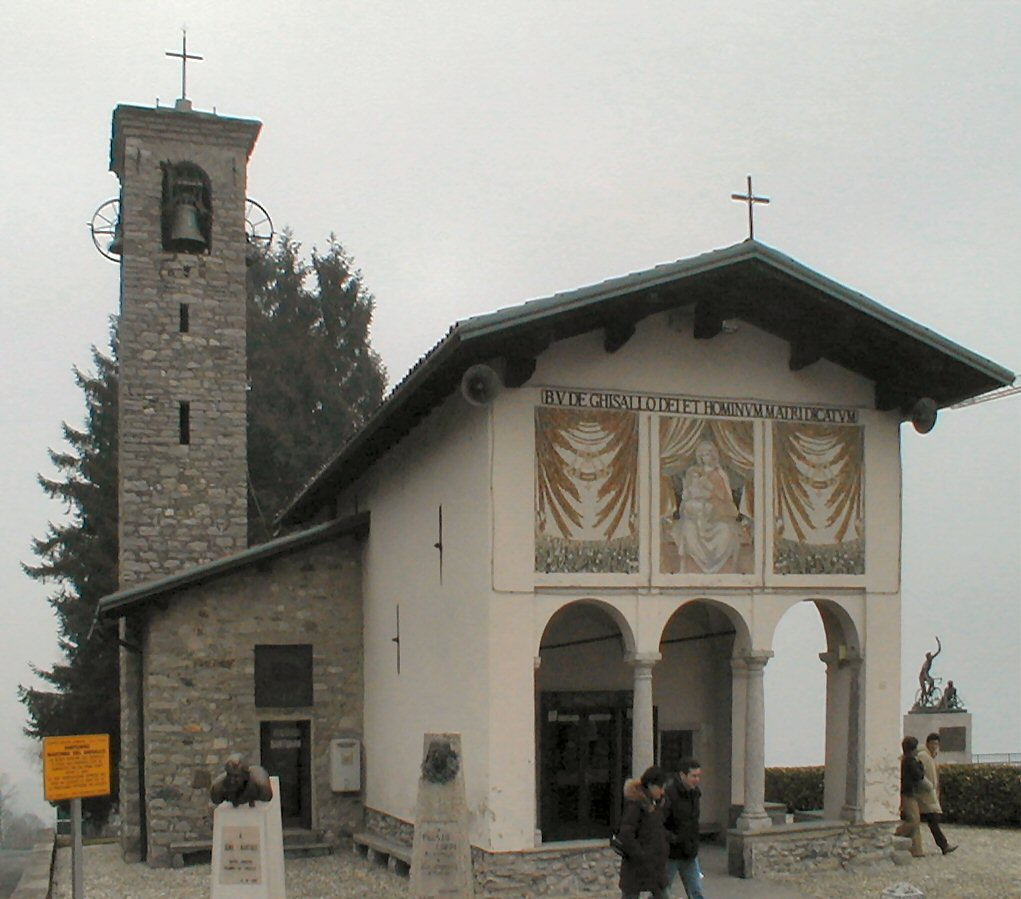
- Church of "Madonna del Ghisallo"
- Location: Magreglio, Lombardy, Italy
- Start: Bellagio, Lombardy
- Gain in altitude: 532 m (1,745 ft)
- Length of climb: 10.6 km (6.6 mi)
- Maximum elevation: 754 m (2,474 ft)
- Average gradient: 5.2 %
- Maximum gradient: 11 %

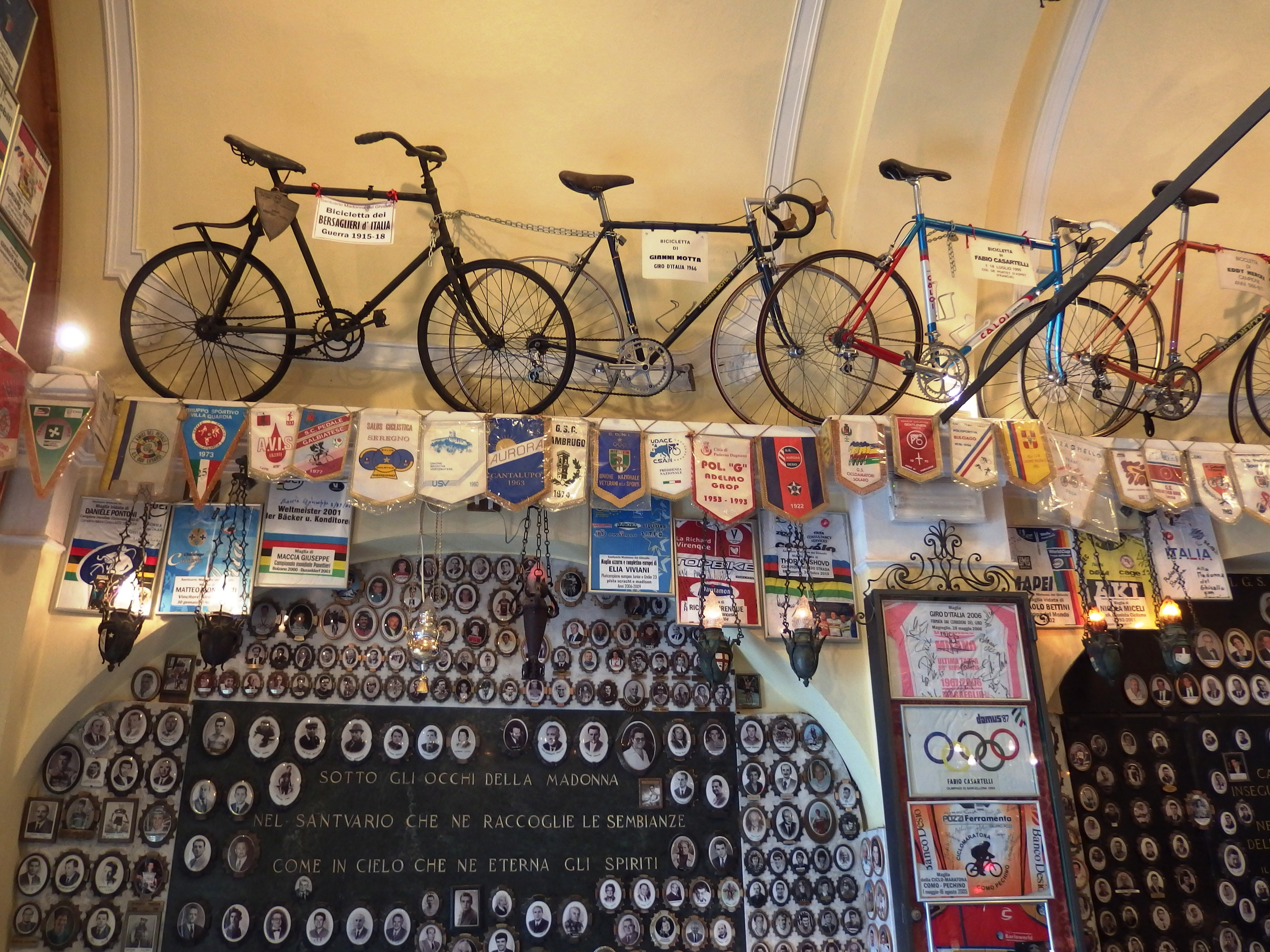
Museo del Ciclismo at the top of the Madonna del Ghisallo.

Madonna del Ghisallo is a Marian sanctuary in Magreglio, near Lake Como in Italy, dedicated to the Virgin Mary under the title Madonna del Ghisallo. The sanctuary has a longstanding association with cycling and with a legend concerning the Virgin Mary. In 1949, Pope Pius XII proclaimed the Madonna del Ghisallo the patroness of cyclists.

== Location ==
The Colle del Ghisallo is a mountain pass on the road connecting Asso and Bellagio, in the Larian Triangle. The point of the pass, at an altitude of approximately 754 m above sea level, is located near Magreglio.

== History ==
According to local legend, the medieval Count Ghisallo was attacked by bandits while crossing the pass. Accounts of the legend vary: the sanctuary's history describes Ghisallo invoking Mary's protection after encountering a religious icon during a hunting trip, while Cyclingnews describes an apparition of the Virgin. The Italian Catholic Church's building inventory describes him taking refuge in a roadside chapel and promising to dedicate a sanctuary if he survived. The Madonna del Ghisallo subsequently became a patroness of local travellers.

The date of the sanctuary's earliest construction is uncertain. A notarial document dated 1135 records a locality named Ghisallo between Civenna and Magreglio, but does not mention a church. By 1623, a religious building existed on the site and was remodelled as a sanctuary. The entrance portico was added in the late seventeenth century.

During the Second World War, the sanctuary served as a place of prayer for people seeking help and protection. The local community appealed to the Virgin Mary for her intercession and made a collective vow in 1944 seeking an end to the conflict. According to the sanctuary's historical account, this vow is commemorated by an annual procession and solemn Mass of thanksgiving for peace on the first Sunday of October. The account also describes the crowning of the image of Mary with a gold crown made from jewellery donated by residents and visitors as an expression of gratitude.

In 1979, the sanctuary established a twinning relationship with the sanctuary of the Black Madonna of Częstochowa in Poland. The sanctuary's historical account records a ceremony in Częstochowa on 22 September and an audience with Pope John Paul II on 26 September, during which documents bearing the pope's signature were presented to mark the relationship.

== Association with cycling ==
The Ghisallo hill became part of the Giro di Lombardia bicycle race and has been included in the route of the Giro d'Italia on numerous occasions. The church sits atop a steep hill that climbs from the shores of Lake Como. It became a natural resting point for cyclists.

By the early twentieth century, cyclists were visiting the sanctuary and leaving offerings in thanksgiving. In the summer of 1947, Carlo Gnocchi organized a gathering at the sanctuary attended by more than 3,000 people, approximately half of them cyclists.

Father Ermelindo Viganò, parish priest and rector of the sanctuary from 1944 to 1985, promoted its connection with cycling. According to the sanctuary's historical account, his proposal arose during the 1947 Giro di Lombardia, when he observed riders making the sign of the cross as they passed the chapel. In September 1947, he wrote to Cardinal Alfredo Ildefonso Schuster requesting that the Virgin Mary, under the title Madonna del Ghisallo, be proclaimed patroness of Italian cycling.

On 13 October 1948, Pius XII lit a votive lamp intended for the sanctuary during a ceremony at Castel Gandolfo. His address described the flame as a symbol of faith and prayer before the image of the Virgin of Ghisallo. A cycling relay brought the lamp to the sanctuary, with Gino Bartali and Fausto Coppi leading its arrival.

On 13 October 1949, Pius XII formally named the Madonna del Ghisallo patroness of cyclists through a papal brief. Saint Clare of Assisi is also regarded as the patron saint of bicycle messengers.

=== Devotional practices ===
Cyclists visit the sanctuary as a place of pilgrimage and devotion to the Madonna del Ghisallo, seeking her protection and leaving bicycles, jerseys, photographs and other objects as ex-voto offerings. The sanctuary also maintains an online Ex-Votos and Dedications service through which cyclists and others may submit personal dedications and photographs. The service extends the sanctuary's physical collection of photographs and memorial offerings and may be used to commemorate deceased cyclists and other people connected with cycling or devoted to the Madonna del Ghisallo.

Devotional images of the Madonna are also carried on bicycles. In 2026, for example, young participants in the Polisportiva Ghisallo Trophy received bicycle straps bearing her image.

The sanctuary also holds a traditional blessing of bicycles. The ceremony is open to cyclists, families, pilgrims and others who bring bicycles to the sanctuary to be blessed before the Madonna del Ghisallo. The sanctuary describes the blessing as an annual tradition in which cyclists entrust their journeys to the Madonna. In 2026, the public bicycle blessing was held on 17 May in conjunction with the Polisportiva Ghisallo Trophy.

Other cycling-related religious observances are held during the year. The sanctuary celebrates regular Masses during June, July and August, and commemorative Masses associated with cyclists are also held there. The sanctuary accepts requests for Masses for the departed, including deceased cyclists.

== Building and monuments ==
According to the sanctuary's historical account, in July 1623 the residents of Magreglio obtained permission to celebrate Mass in the chapel they had rebuilt. In 1660, the priest G. B. Bonanome established an endowment for Masses at the sanctuary. The three-arched entrance portico was added in 1681.

Interior of the Madonna del Ghisallo sanctuary.

The church has a single nave and a rectangular presbytery, with a polychrome marble altar. Its sixteenth-century image of the Madonna del Latte, depicting Mary nursing the infant Jesus, was detached from its original fresco surface, transferred to canvas, and returned to the altar during restoration work in 1950.

The bronze votive lamp inside the church was created by sculptor Carmelo Cappello and installed in October 1948 in remembrance of deceased cyclists. Standing 1.4 metres high on a bronze stele, it incorporates four scenes from Italian cycling history. A bronze Monument to the Cyclist by Elio Ponti was installed outside in 1973. The monument depicts a victorious rider raising an arm alongside an exhausted cyclist, representing victory and defeat.

== Cycling memorabilia ==
The shrine of Madonna del Ghisallo contains a collection of photographs and artefacts from cycling. The church is home to many bicycles and cycling jerseys used by cyclists in races, along with cycling-club pennants and memorial photographs of deceased riders.

Gino Bartali donated bicycles associated with his Tour de France victories in 1938 and 1948 to the sanctuary as devotional offerings.

One particularly notable artefact is the crumpled bicycle that Fabio Casartelli, a native of the region, rode on the day that he died in a crash in the 1995 Tour de France. Casartelli, the 1992 Olympic road-race champion, died on the descent of the Col de Portet d'Aspet.

In a 2008 account, Cyclingnews described bicycles associated with Gino Bartali, Eddy Merckx, Felice Gimondi, Gianni Motta, and Francesco Moser, alongside world champions' jerseys and pink jerseys from the Giro d'Italia. It also described an electric memorial light inside the chapel as an "eternal flame" for deceased cyclists.

== Cycling museum ==
The Fondazione Museo del Ciclismo–Madonna del Ghisallo was created in 2000. Its first action was to organize a torch relay from the chapel to the Vatican, delivering the torch to the then Pope John Paul II.

The nearby Museo del Ghisallo opened in October 2006, with Fiorenzo Magni playing a leading role in its establishment. On 31 May 2006, Pope Benedict XVI blessed the final stone for the building, inscribed Omnia vincit amor ("Love conquers all").

Designed by architect Davide Bergna, the museum occupies three levels and has large windows overlooking the surrounding mountains. Its collections address competitive cycling, recreational riding, and the bicycle's use in everyday life.

== Other cycling chapels and shrines ==
The Madonna del Ghisallo inspired Father Joseph Massie to establish a similar place of pilgrimage for cyclists at Notre Dame des Cyclistes, a chapel in Labastide-d'Armagnac, France. The French sanctuary was inaugurated and blessed on 18 May 1959 by Clément Mathieu, Bishop of Aire and Dax, as the national sanctuary of French cyclists.

In May 1961, Father Massie led a group of approximately ten cyclists from France on a visit to the Ghisallo sanctuary, where they were welcomed by Father Viganò, before continuing to Bellagio.

Another sanctuary associated with cycling is Nuestra Señora de Dorleta in Leintz-Gatzaga, Gipuzkoa, in the Basque Country, Spain. The Virgin Mary is venerated there under the title Our Lady of Dorleta as a patroness of cyclists.

In the United States, St. Stephen's Episcopal Parish in Portland, Oregon, dedicated the Madonna del Ghisallo Portland Bicycle Shrine in November 2009. The shrine included a painting of Mary by artist Martin Wolfe and provided a place for cyclists to pray, reflect, and remember those who had died while cycling.

In Klein-Sinaai, Belgium, the Grotto of Our Lady of Cyclists stands behind the village church. The grotto and the cycling museum inside the church display signed racing jerseys donated by cyclists, including Philippe Gilbert and Wout van Aert.

The Kapel van de Ronde in Horebeke, Belgium, is associated with the Tour of Flanders and serves as a meeting place for cycling enthusiasts and touring cyclists.
