= Notre Dame des Cyclistes =

Chapel in Les Landes, Aquitaine, France

Coordinates: 43.954872°N 0.162244°W

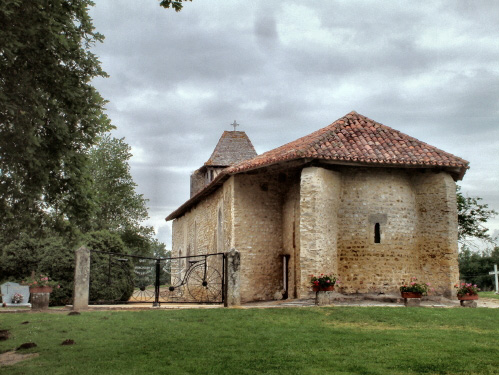
Notre-Dame des Cyclistes

The chapel of Notre-Dame des Cyclistes is situated in the commune of Labastide-d'Armagnac in Les Landes département in Aquitaine, France.

The chapel is all that remains of a 12th-century fortress of the Knights Templar. The Château de Géou was razed by the Black Prince in 1355.

It was listed as a monument historique by the French Ministry of Culture on 27 February 1996.

== History ==
On 22 August 1958, Father Joseph Massie, pastor of Créon-d'Armagnac, Mauvezin-d'Armagnac and Lagrange, was inspired by the chapel of Madonna del Ghisallo in Italy to make a similar chapel for cyclists. On 18 May 1959, Pope John XXIII agreed to make the old chapel a National Sanctuary of Cycling and Cyclists under the protection of the Virgin: Our Lady of cyclists (Notre-Dame des cyclistes).

The Tour de France has passed the chapel six times, in 1984, 1989, 1995, 2000, 2017, and most recently 2023 (during Stage 4). The Tour departed from Labastide-d'Armagnac on 9 July 1989.

== Museum of cycling ==
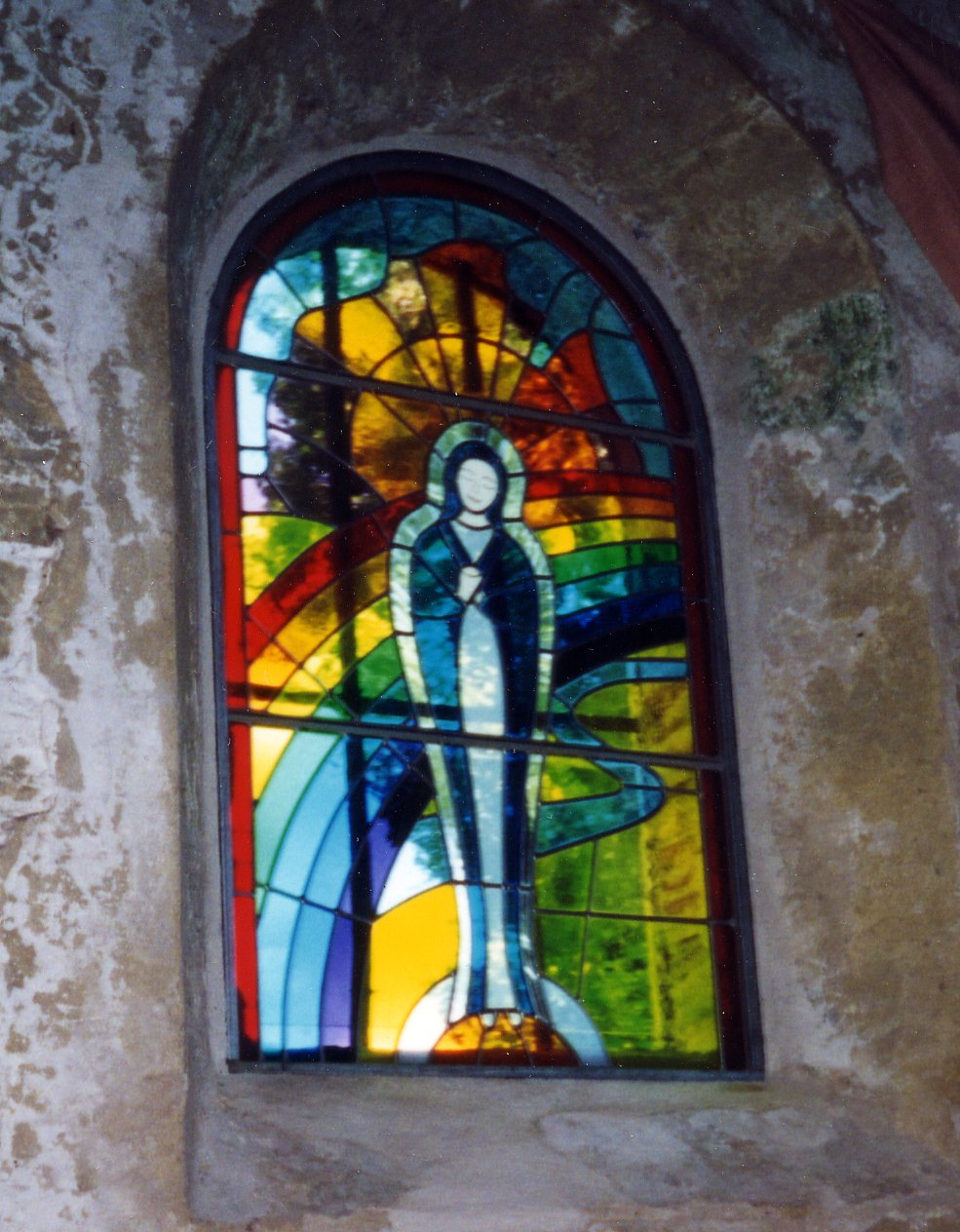
The stained glass window installed by Henri Anglade.

The chapel and museum is a focal point for amateur cyclists and tourists. In 1958, it was converted into a Museum of Cycling in aid of French racing and touring cyclists. Numerous champions have donated their shirts, including André Darrigade, Jacques Anquetil, Louison Bobet, Tom Simpson, Roger Lapébie, Jean Stablinski, Bernard Hinault, Raymond Poulidor, Eddy Merckx, and Luis Ocaña

The chapel includes a stained glass window designed and created by Henri Anglade, a former rider of the Tour de France, to represent cycling. It was reportedly intended to celebrate a thaw in the intense rivalry between Fausto Coppi and Gino Bartali, as they shared a bottle (bidon) on the Col d'Izoard during the 1952 Tour de France.

The bicycle used in the French film Les Cracks (1968), directed by Alex Joffé, is on display at the museum.

== Other cycling chapels and shrines ==
- Madonna del Ghisallo, a sanctuary in Magreglio near Lake Como, Italy. In 1949, Pope Pius XII proclaimed the Virgin Mary, under the title Madonna del Ghisallo, patroness of cyclists.
- Nuestra Señora de Dorleta, situated in Leintz-Gatzaga (Basque; in Spanish Salinas de Léniz) in the province of Guipuzcoa.
- The Madonna del Ghisallo Portland Bicycle Shrine, established in November 2009 at St. Stephen's Episcopal Parish in Portland, Oregon, United States, as a place of prayer, reflection, and remembrance of deceased cyclists.
- The Grotto of Our Lady of Cyclists in Klein-Sinaai, Belgium. The grotto and the cycling museum inside the adjoining church display signed racing jerseys donated by cyclists.
- The Kapel van de Ronde in Horebeke, Belgium, associated with the Tour of Flanders and serving as a meeting place for cycling enthusiasts and touring cyclists.
