= 2007 Deutschland Tour =

The 31st edition of the Deutschland Tour cycle race took place in Germany from August 10 to August 18, 2007. It did not start with the traditional prologue but with a normal stage. The race included a team time trial, an individual time trial and seven stages, covering a total of 1,292.5 km (803.1 mi). The race began in Saarbrücken and finished in Hanover. For the second year in a row Jens Voigt held off Levi Leipheimer to take the victory.

== Final General Classification ==
	Cyclist	Country	Team	Time
1	Jens Voigt	Germany	Team CSC	30h 57' 21"
2	Levi Leipheimer	United States	Discovery Channel	1' 57"
3	David López	Spain	Caisse d'Epargne	2' 10"
4	Leonardo Bertagnolli	Italy	LIQ	3' 05"
5	Robert Gesink	Netherlands	RAB	3' 15"
6	Chris Anker Sørensen	Denmark	Team CSC	4' 06"
7	Maxime Monfort	Belgium	Cofidis	5' 22"
8	Laurens ten Dam	Netherlands	UNI	5' 26"
9	Gustav Larsson	Sweden	UNI	6' 08"
10	Davide Rebellin	Italy	Gerolsteiner	6' 16"

== Teams ==
23 teams took part. Of the 20 ProTour teams, only Astana did not take part (the team was in crisis from doping results at the 2007 Tour de France). Four non-ProTour teams were given a wildcard invitation: Skil–Shimano, Team Volksbank, Team Wiesenhof–Felt and Elk Haus-Simplon.

== Stages ==
=== Stage 1 Saarbrücken 183.7 km Friday, August 10 ===
Stage 1 result

	Cyclist	Country	Team	Results
1	Robert Förster	Germany	Gerolsteiner	4h 24' 16"
2	Danilo Napolitano	Italy	Lampre–Fondital	s.t
3	Erik Zabel	Germany	MRM	s.t

General Classification after Stage 1

	Cyclist	Country	Team	Time
1	Robert Förster	Germany	Gerolsteiner	4h 24' 16"
2	Maarten den Bakker	Netherlands	SKS	2"
3	Danilo Napolitano	Italy	Lampre–Fondital	4"

=== Stage 2 Bretten Team Time Trial 42.2 km Saturday, August 11 ===
Stage 2 result

	TEAM	Country	Results
1	Team CSC	Denmark	51' 40"
2	Discovery Channel	United States	25"
3	Gerolsteiner	Germany	55"

General Classification after Stage 2

	Cyclist	Country	Team	Time
1	Jens Voigt	Germany	Team CSC	5h 15' 55"
2	Fabian Cancellara	Switzerland	Team CSC	1"
3	Bobby Julich	United States	Team CSC	1"

=== Stage 3 Pforzheim – Offenburg 181.8 km Sunday, August 12 ===
Stage 3 result

	Cyclist	Country	Team	Results
1	Erik Zabel	Germany	MRM	4h 49' 25"
2	José Joaquín Rojas Gil	Spain	Caisse d'Epargne	s.t
3	Bradley McGee	Australia	Française des Jeux	s.t

General Classification after Stage 3

	Cyclist	Country	Team	Time
1	Jens Voigt	Germany	Team CSC	10h 05' 20"
2	Bobby Julich	United States	Team CSC	1"
3	Alexandr Kolobnev	Russia	Team CSC	1"

=== Stage 4 Singen – Sonthofen 183.8 km Monday, August 13 ===
Stage 4 result

	Cyclist	Country	Team	Results
1	Damiano Cunego	Italy	Lampre–Fondital	4h 28' 06"
2	Davide Rebellin	Italy	Gerolsteiner	s.t
3	David López	Spain	Caisse d'Epargne	s.t

General Classification after Stage 4

	Cyclist	Country	Team	Time
1	Jens Voigt	Germany	Team CSC	14h 33' 31"
2	Chris Anker Sørensen	Denmark	Team CSC	1"
3	George Hincapie	United States	Discovery Channel	27"

=== Stage 5 Singen – Sölden (Austria) 157.6 km Tuesday, August 14 ===
Stage 5 result

	Cyclist	Country	Team	Results
1	David López	Spain	Caisse d'Epargne	4h 21' 07"
2	Jens Voigt	Germany	Team CSC	12"
3	Robert Gesink	Netherlands	RAB	19"

General Classification after Stage 5

	Cyclist	Country	Team	Time
1	Jens Voigt	Germany	Team CSC	18h 54' 34"
2	David López	Spain	Caisse d'Epargne	33"
3	Robert Gesink	Netherlands	RAB	1' 14"

=== Stage 6 Längenfeld (Austria) – Kufstein (Austria) 175 km Wednesday, August 15 ===
Stage 6 result

	Cyclist	Country	Team	Results
1	Gerald Ciolek	Germany	T-Mobile Team	3h 57' 40"
2	Danilo Napolitano	Italy	Lampre–Fondital	s.t.
3	José Joaquín Rojas	Spain	Caisse d'Epargne	s.t.

General Classification after Stage 6

	Cyclist	Country	Team	Time
1	Jens Voigt	Germany	Team CSC	22h 52' 14"
2	David López	Spain	Caisse d'Epargne	33"
3	Robert Gesink	Netherlands	RAB	1' 14"

=== Stage 7 Kufstein (Austria) – Regensburg 192.2 km Thursday, August 16 ===
Stage 7 result

	Cyclist	Country	Team	Results
1	Gerald Ciolek	Germany	T-Mobile Team	4h 08' 20"
2	Erik Zabel	Germany	MRM	s.t.
3	José Joaquín Rojas	Spain	Caisse d'Epargne	s.t.

General Classification after Stage 7

	Cyclist	Country	Team	Time
1	Jens Voigt	Germany	Team CSC	27h 00' 44"
2	David López	Spain	Caisse d'Epargne	33"
3	Robert Gesink	Netherlands	RAB	1' 14"

=== Stage 8 Fürth Individual Time Trial 33.1 km Friday, August 17 ===
Stage 8 result

	Cyclist	Country	Team	Results
1	Jens Voigt	Germany	Team CSC	39' 42"
2	László Bodrogi	Hungary	Crédit Agricole	15"
3	Levi Leipheimer	United States	Discovery Channel	26"

General Classification after Stage 8

	Cyclist	Country	Team	Time
1	Jens Voigt	Germany	Team CSC	27h 40' 26"
2	Levi Leipheimer	United States	Discovery Channel	1' 57"
3	David López	Spain	Caisse d'Epargne	2' 10"

=== Stage 9 Einbeck – Hannover 143.1 km Saturday, August 18 ===
Stage 9 result

	Cyclist	Country	Team	Results
1	Gerald Ciolek	Germany	T-Mobile Team	3h 16' 55"
2	Erik Zabel	Germany	MRM	s.t.
3	Mark Renshaw	Australia	Crédit Agricole	s.t.

== Jersey progress ==
Stage (Winner)	General classification	Points classification	Mountains classification	Young rider classification	Team classification
Stage 1 (Robert Förster)	Robert Förster	Robert Förster	Matej Mugerli	Philipp Ludescher	Bouygues Télécom
Stage 2 (Team CSC)	Jens Voigt	Robert Förster	Matej Mugerli	Andy Schleck	Team CSC
Stage 3 (Erik Zabel)	Jens Voigt	Erik Zabel	Niki Terpstra	Andy Schleck	Team CSC
Stage 4 (Damiano Cunego)	Jens Voigt	José Joaquín Rojas	Niki Terpstra	Chris Anker Sørensen	Team CSC
Stage 5 (David López)	Jens Voigt	José Joaquín Rojas	Niki Terpstra	Robert Gesink	Team CSC
Stage 6 (Gerald Ciolek)	Jens Voigt	José Joaquín Rojas	Niki Terpstra	Robert Gesink	Team CSC
Stage 7 (Gerald Ciolek)	Jens Voigt	Erik Zabel	Niki Terpstra	Robert Gesink	Team CSC
Stage 8 (Jens Voigt)	Jens Voigt	Erik Zabel	Niki Terpstra	Robert Gesink	Team CSC
Stage 9 (Gerald Ciolek)	Jens Voigt	Erik Zabel	Niki Terpstra	Robert Gesink	Team CSC
