= Nuestra Señora de Dorleta =

Sanctuary in Gipuzkoa, Spain

Sanctuary of Our Lady of Dorleta
- Dorletako Amaren santutegia (Basque); Santuario de Nuestra Señora de Dorleta (Spanish)
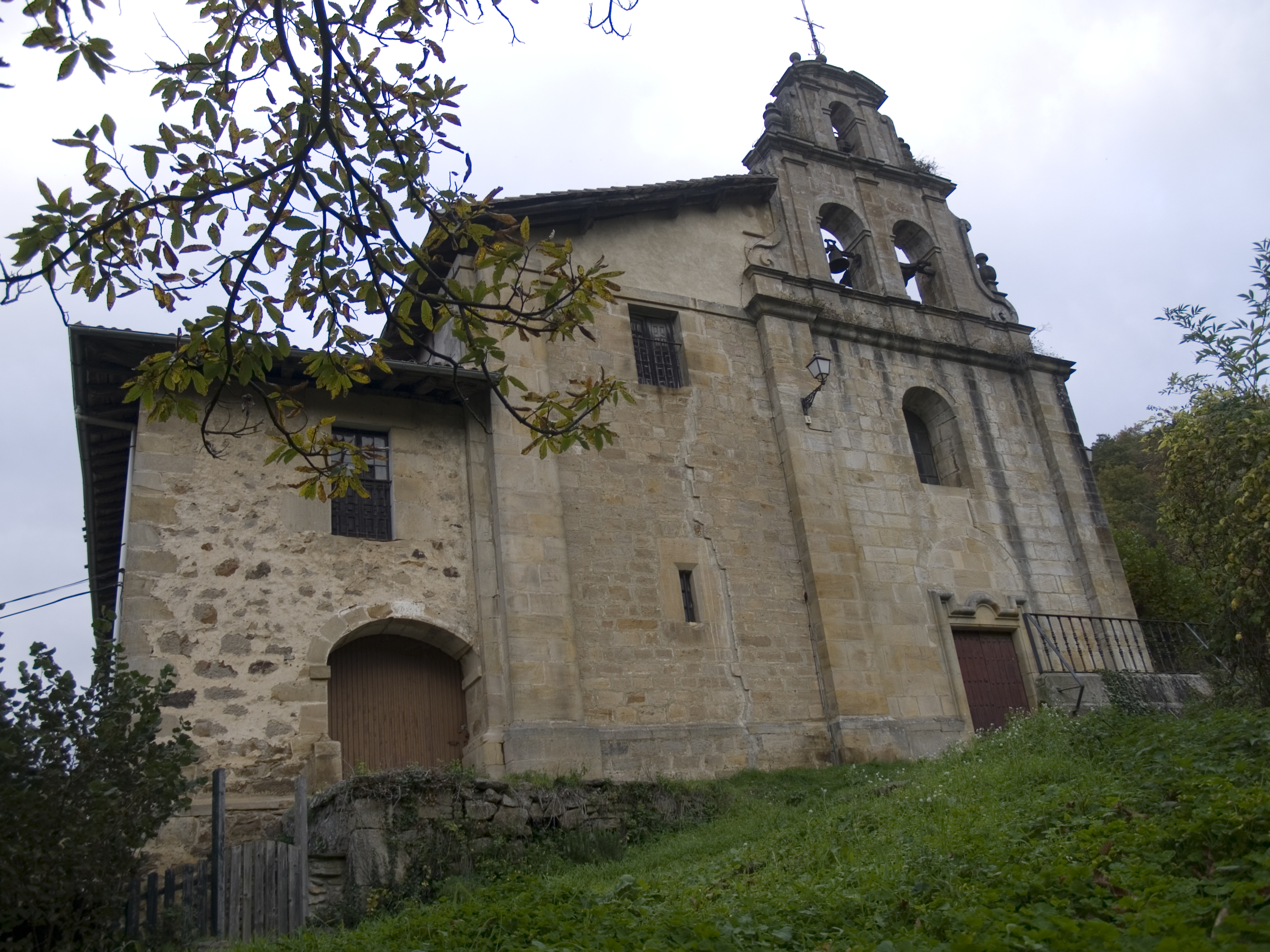
- View of the sanctuary
- Sanctuary of Our Lady of Dorleta
- 42.9819°N 2.5653°W
- Location: Leintz Gatzaga, Gipuzkoa, Basque Country
- Country: Spain
- Denomination: Catholic Church
- Tradition: Latin Church

Administration
- Archdiocese: Archidiocese of Pamplona and Tudela
- Diocese: Diocese of San Sebastián

The Sanctuary of Our Lady of Dorleta (Basque: Dorletako Amaren santutegia, Spanish: Santuario de Nuestra Señora de Dorleta) is in the village of Leintz Gatzaga in the Gipuzkoa province of the Basque Country in Spain, near the Arlaban pass. The sanctuary has been documented since the Middle Ages, but most of the current structure is Baroque. Our Lady of Dorleta is considered the patron saint of cyclists in Spain.

== Building and religious image ==
The sanctuary served as accommodation for pilgrims on the Way of Saint James. Its present appearance largely reflects seventeenth-century construction, although successive alterations have preserved elements from earlier periods. Inside is a Gothic sculpture depicting the Virgin Mary holding the infant Jesus, with mother and child looking towards one another.

== Association with cycling ==
In 1960, three cyclists, Luis and Ángel Serrano from Bilbao and José Luis Sáenz de Olazagoitia from Vitoria-Gasteiz, travelled by bicycle to Rome to present a request for Our Lady of Dorleta to be formally designated patroness of Spanish cyclists. They were received by Pope John XXIII. According to the Basque Government's cycling guide, the proclamation followed on 28 August 1960.

The sanctuary receives offerings from professional cyclists, touring cyclists, and cycling clubs. A separate roadside monument to Our Lady of Dorleta stands at the summit of the nearby Arlaban pass.

== See also ==
- Madonna del Ghisallo, a Marian sanctuary associated with cycling in Lombardy, Italy.
- Notre Dame des Cyclistes, a French national sanctuary for cyclists in Labastide-d'Armagnac.
