= 2006 Giro d'Italia =

2006 UCI ProTour, race 12 of 27
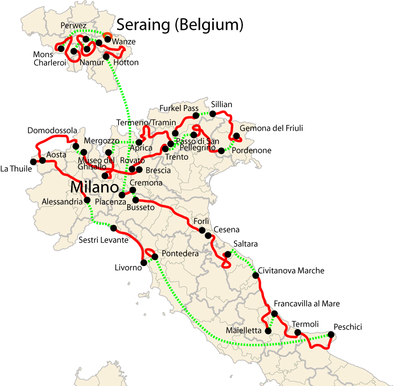
- Overview of the stages: route from Seraing, in Belgium, to Milan covered by the riders on the bicycle (red) and distances between stages (green)

Race details
- Dates: 6 – 28 May 2006
- Stages: 21
- Distance: 3,526.2 km (2,191.1 mi)
- Winning time: 91h 33' 36"

Results
Jersey awarded to the overall winner	Winner	Ivan Basso (ITA)	(Team CSC)
	Second	José Enrique Gutiérrez (ESP)	(Phonak)
	Third	Gilberto Simoni (ITA)	(Saunier Duval–Prodir)
Jersey awarded to the points classification winner	Points	Paolo Bettini (ITA)	(Quick-Step–Innergetic)
Jersey awarded to the mountains classification winner	Mountains	Juan Manuel Gárate (ESP)	(Quick-Step–Innergetic)
Jersey awarded to the combination classification winner	Combination	Paolo Savoldelli (ITA)	(Discovery Channel)
Jersey awarded to the combativity classification winner	Combativity	Paolo Bettini (ITA)	(Quick-Step–Innergetic)
	Team	Phonak	
	Team points	Phonak	

The 2006 Giro d'Italia was the 89th edition of the Giro d'Italia, one of cycling's Grand Tours. It began in the Belgian city of Seraing with a 6.2 km (3.9 mi) individual time trial. The race came to a close with a 140 km (87.0 mi) mass-start road stage that stretched from Museo del Ghisallo to Milan. Twenty-two teams entered the race that was won by the Italian Ivan Basso of the Team CSC team. Second and third were the Spain José Enrique Gutiérrez and Italian Gilberto Simoni.

Basso, riding for Team CSC, won the Giro in dominant fashion. Basso won three individual stages, as well as the team time trial, along with his fellow Team CSC riders, and won the overall classification by more than 9 minutes over the next best rider, the largest margin of victory in a Grand Tour in the last three years.

In the other classifications that the race awarded, Paolo Bettini of the Quick-Step–Innergetic team won the points classification, Quick Step-Innergetic rider Juan Manuel Gárate won the mountains classification, and Paolo Savoldelli of the Discovery Channel won the combination classification. Phonak finished as the winners of the Trofeo Fast Team classification, ranking each of the twenty-two teams contesting the race by lowest cumulative time. The other team classification, the Trofeo Super Team classification, where the teams' riders are awarded points for placing within the top twenty in each stage and the points are then totaled for each team was also won by Phonak.

== Teams ==
Twenty-two teams contested the 2006 Giro. Since it was a UCI ProTour event, the 20 ProTour teams were automatically invited and obligated to send a squad. Race officials also invited two other teams. Each team sent a squad of nine riders, giving the race a 198-man peloton at its outset.

The 22 that competed in the race were:

- AG2R Prévoyance
- Bouygues Télécom
- Caisse d'Epargne–Illes Balears
- Ceramica Panaria–Navigare
- Cofidis
- Crédit Agricole
- Davitamon–Lotto
- Discovery Channel
- Euskaltel–Euskadi
- Française des Jeux
- Gerolsteiner
- Lampre–Fondital
- Liberty Seguros–Würth
- Liquigas
- Phonak
- Quick-Step–Innergetic
- Rabobank
- Saunier Duval–Prodir
- Selle Italia–Diquigiovanni
- T-Mobile Team
- Team CSC
- Team Milram

== Race previews and favorites ==
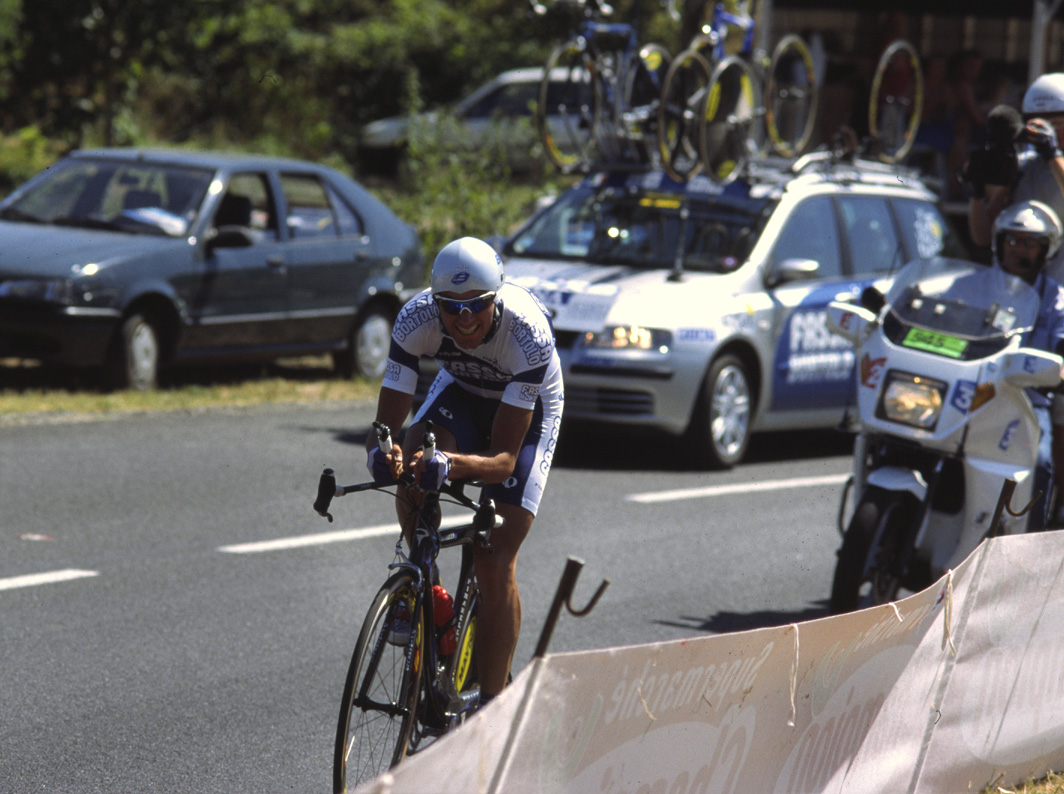
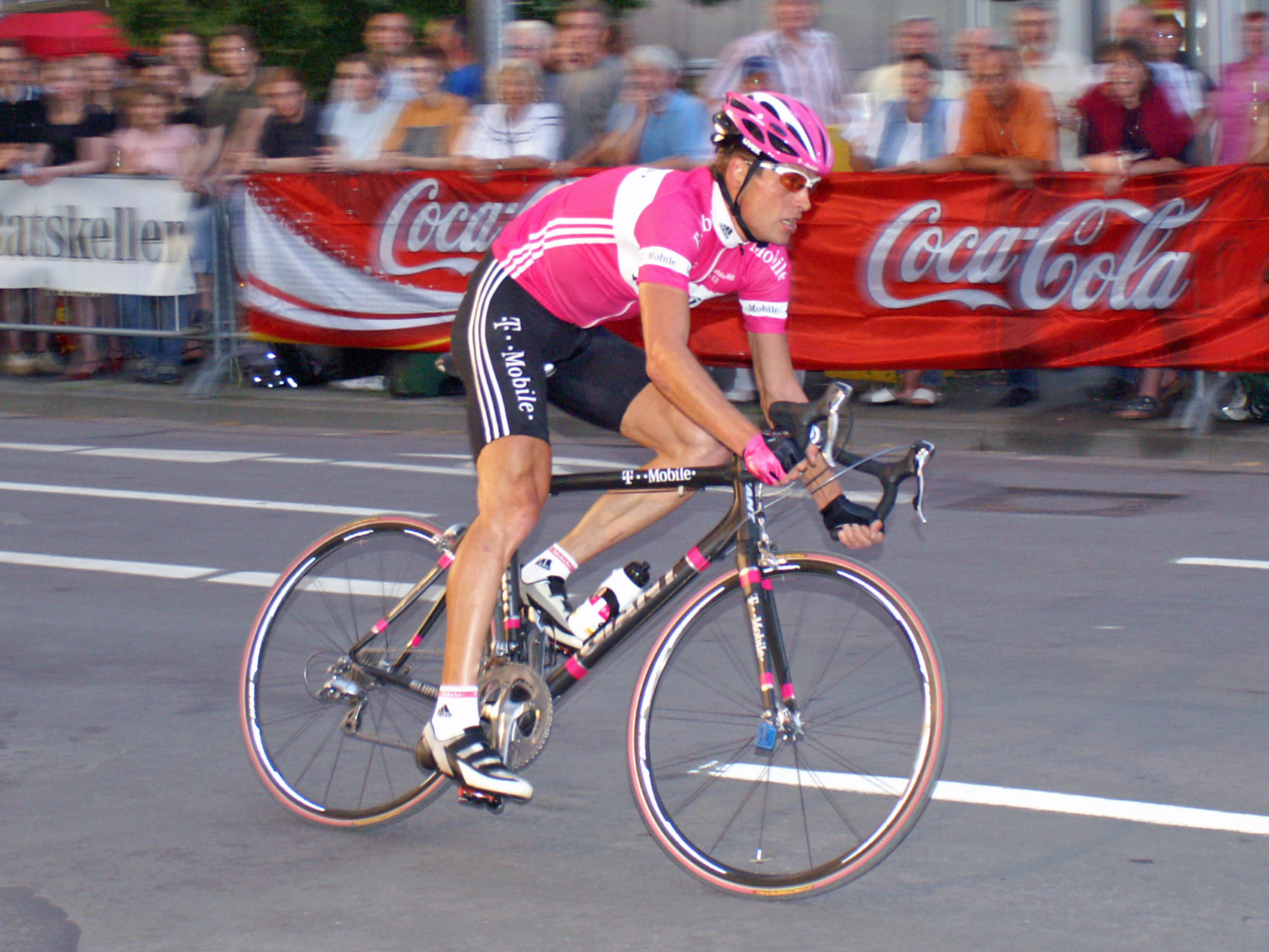
Ivan Basso (left) and Jan Ullrich (right) were considered favourites for this edition of the Giro d’Italia.

Before the race, Ivan Basso and Jan Ullrich were seen as the biggest favorites and the most likely to win, due to them performing well in the prior years. Also preferred were Paolo Savoldelli along with Damiano Cunego.

== Route and stages ==
The 2006 Giro opened, and had its first four stages in the South-East of Belgium in the Wallonia region. The Giro organisers chose to locate the opening in this region as a homage to the thousands of Italians who moved to the region following the end of World War II in order to find jobs in the coal mines of the area. It is estimated that as many as 300'000 Belgians of Italian origin live in this area. The 2006 Giro commemorated the deaths of 136 Italian miners who died in the 1956 Bois du Cazier mine disaster.

The race introduced a team time trial stage upon its arrival in Italy. This discipline had been absent from the Giro since edition 1989. It also included 56.2 km (34.9 mi) of individual time trials, distributed between the prologue and the long time trial at Pontedera.

It also featured famous climbs, such as the steep Mortirolo and the Monte Bondone. There were plans to visit Plan de Corones for the first time; however, bad weather prevented the unpaved climb from being used. It instead saw its debut in the Giro d'Italia in 2008.

Stage characteristics and winners
Stage	Date	Course	Distance	Type	Winner
1	6 May	Seraing (Belgium)	6.2 km (3.9 mi)	Individual time trial	Paolo Savoldelli (ITA)
2	7 May	Mons (Belgium) to Charleroi (Belgium)	197 km (122 mi)	Flat stage	Robbie McEwen (AUS)
3	8 May	Perwez (Belgium) to Namur (Belgium)	202 km (126 mi)	Undulating stage	Stefan Schumacher (GER)
4	9 May	Wanze (Belgium) to Hotton (Belgium)	193 km (120 mi)	Flat stage	Robbie McEwen (AUS)
	10 May	Rest day			
5	11 May	Piacenza to Cremona	38 km (24 mi)	Team time trial	Team CSC
6	12 May	Busseto to Forlì	227 km (141 mi)	Flat stage	Robbie McEwen (AUS)
7	13 May	Cesena to Saltara	236 km (147 mi)	Medium mountain stage	Rik Verbrugghe (BEL)
8	14 May	Civitanova Marche to Maielletta	171 km (106 mi)	Medium mountain stage	Ivan Basso (ITA)
9	15 May	Francavilla al Mare to Termoli	121 km (75 mi)	Flat stage	Tomas Vaitkus (LTU)
10	16 May	Termoli to Peschici	187 km (116 mi)	Undulating stage	Franco Pellizotti (ITA)
	17 May	Rest day			
11	18 May	Pontedera	50 km (31 mi)	Individual time trial	~~Jan Ullrich (GER)~~ (Note: Jan Ullrich was the original winner of stage 11 but was later disqualified after the Court of Arbitration for Sports disqualified Ullrich's results from May 2005 on after having tested positive for performance enhancing drugs.)
12	19 May	Livorno to Sestri Levante	171 km (106 mi)	Undulating stage	Joan Horrach (ESP)
13	20 May	Alessandria to La Thuile	218 km (135 mi)	Medium mountain stage	Leonardo Piepoli (ITA)
14	21 May	Aosta to Domodossola	223 km (139 mi)	Mountain stage	Luis Felipe Laverde (COL)
15	22 May	Mergozzo to Brescia	189 km (117 mi)	Flat stage	Paolo Bettini (ITA)
16	23 May	Rovato to Trento	173 km (107 mi)	Medium mountain stage	Ivan Basso (ITA)
17	24 May	Tramin to Plan de Corones	133 km (83 mi)	Mountain stage	Leonardo Piepoli (ITA)
18	25 May	Sillian (Austria) to Gemona del Friuli	210 km (130 mi)	Undulating stage	Stefan Schumacher (GER)
19	26 May	Pordenone to Passo di San Pellegrino	224 km (139 mi)	Mountain stage	Juan Manuel Gárate (ESP)
20	27 May	Trento to Aprica	211 km (131 mi)	Mountain stage	Ivan Basso (ITA)
21	28 May	Museo del Ghisallo to Milan	140 km (87 mi)	Flat stage	Robert Förster (GER)
	Total		3,526.2 km (2,191 mi)		

== Classification leadership ==
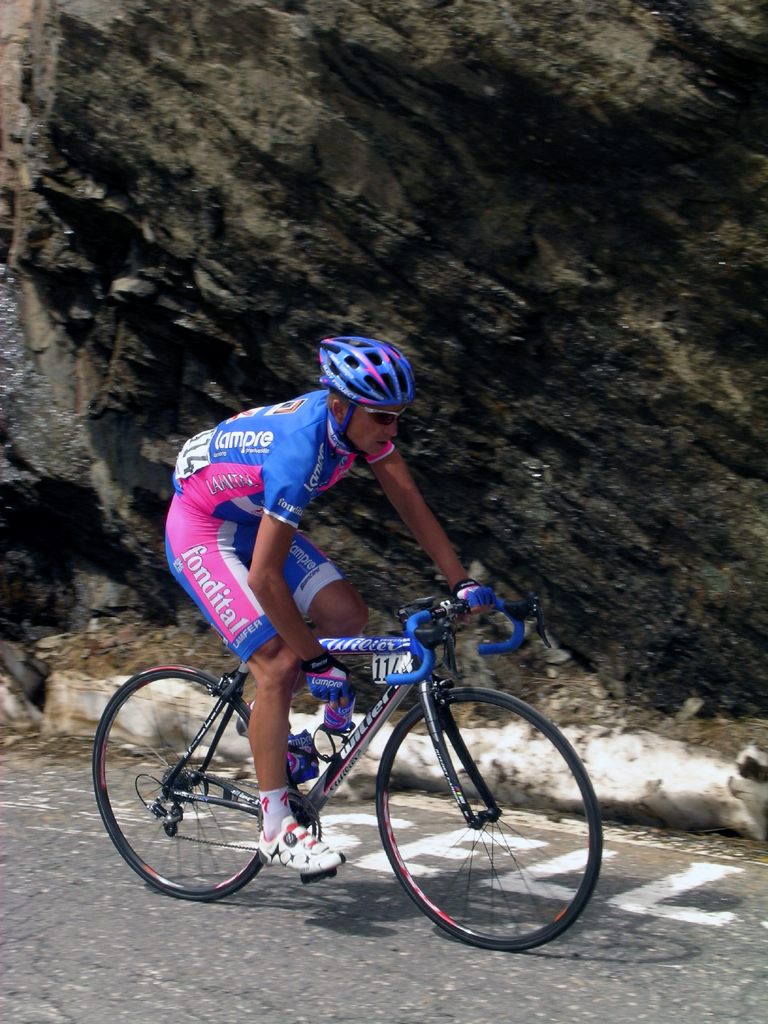
Lampre rider Evgeni Petrov riding on the slopes of the Passo di Gavia

In the 2006 Giro d'Italia, four different jerseys were awarded. For the general classification, calculated by adding each cyclist's finishing times on each stage, and allowing time bonuses for the first three finishers on mass start stages, the leader received a pink jersey. This classification is considered the most important of the Giro d'Italia, and the winner is considered the winner of the Giro.

Additionally, there was a points classification, which awarded a mauve jersey. In the points classification, cyclists got points for finishing in the top 15 in a stage. The stage win awarded 25 points, second place awarded 20 points, third 16, fourth 14, fifth 12, sixth 10, and one point less per place down the line, to a single point for 15th. In addition, some points could be won in intermediate sprints.

There was also a mountains classification, which awarded a green jersey. In the mountains classifications, points were won by reaching the top of a mountain before other cyclists. Each climb was categorized, either first, second, or third category, with more points available for the higher-categorized climbs. The highest point in the Giro (called the Cima Coppi), which in 2006 was the Passo di Gavia in stage 20, afforded still more points than the other first-category climbs.

The fourth was the combination classification, which awarded a blue jersey. In the combination classification, the top 15 placed riders each day in the general, points, mountains, and 110 Gazzetta classifications earned points, 15 for first and one point less per place down the line, to a single point for 15th. These points were tallied throughout the Giro.

There were also two classifications for teams. The first was the Trofeo Fast Team. In this classification, the times of the best three cyclists per team on each stage are added, and the team with the lowest time is leading team. The Trofeo Super Team was a team points classification, with the top 20 placed riders on each stage earning points (20 for first place, 19 for second place and so on, down to a single point for 20th) for their team.

Classification leadership by stage
Stage	Winner	General classification	Points classification	Mountains classification	Combination classification	Trofeo Fast Team	Trofeo Super Team
1	Paolo Savoldelli	Paolo Savoldelli	Paolo Savoldelli	Paolo Savoldelli	Paolo Savoldelli	Discovery Channel	not awarded
2	Robbie McEwen	Paolo Savoldelli	Paolo Savoldelli	Paolo Savoldelli	Paolo Savoldelli	Discovery Channel	T-Mobile Team
3	Stefan Schumacher	Stefan Schumacher	Stefan Schumacher	Moisés Aldape	Paolo Savoldelli	Discovery Channel	Davitamon–Lotto
4	Robbie McEwen	Stefan Schumacher	Robbie McEwen	Sandy Casar	Paolo Savoldelli	Discovery Channel	Davitamon–Lotto
5	Team CSC	Serhiy Honchar	Robbie McEwen	Sandy Casar	Paolo Savoldelli	T-Mobile Team	Davitamon–Lotto
6	Robbie McEwen	Olaf Pollack	Robbie McEwen	Sandy Casar	Paolo Savoldelli	T-Mobile Team	Davitamon–Lotto
7	Rik Verbrugghe	Serhiy Honchar	Robbie McEwen	Staf Scheirlinckx	Paolo Savoldelli	Discovery Channel	Davitamon–Lotto
8	Ivan Basso	Ivan Basso	Robbie McEwen	Ivan Basso	Paolo Savoldelli	Discovery Channel	Davitamon–Lotto
9	Tomas Vaitkus	Ivan Basso	Robbie McEwen	Ivan Basso	Paolo Savoldelli	Discovery Channel	Davitamon–Lotto
10	Franco Pellizotti	Ivan Basso	Robbie McEwen	Ivan Basso	Paolo Savoldelli	Liquigas	Davitamon–Lotto
11	~~Jan Ullrich~~	Ivan Basso	Robbie McEwen	Ivan Basso	Paolo Savoldelli	Discovery Channel	T-Mobile Team
12	Joan Horrach	Ivan Basso	Robbie McEwen	Ivan Basso	Paolo Savoldelli	Discovery Channel	T-Mobile Team
13	Leonardo Piepoli	Ivan Basso	Paolo Bettini	Ivan Basso	Paolo Savoldelli	Discovery Channel	Discovery Channel
14	Luis Felipe Laverde	Ivan Basso	Paolo Bettini	Fortunato Baliani	Paolo Savoldelli	Phonak	Ceramica Panaria–Navigare
15	Paolo Bettini	Ivan Basso	Paolo Bettini	Fortunato Baliani	Paolo Savoldelli	Phonak	Ceramica Panaria–Navigare
16	Ivan Basso	Ivan Basso	Paolo Bettini	Ivan Basso	Paolo Savoldelli	Phonak	Phonak
17	Leonardo Piepoli	Ivan Basso	Ivan Basso	Ivan Basso	Paolo Savoldelli	Phonak	Phonak
18	Stefan Schumacher	Ivan Basso	Paolo Bettini	Ivan Basso	Paolo Savoldelli	Phonak	Phonak
19	Juan Manuel Gárate	Ivan Basso	Paolo Bettini	Fortunato Baliani	Paolo Savoldelli	Phonak	Phonak
20	Ivan Basso	Ivan Basso	Ivan Basso	Juan Manuel Gárate	Paolo Savoldelli	Phonak	Phonak
21	Robert Förster	Ivan Basso	Paolo Bettini	Juan Manuel Gárate	Paolo Savoldelli	Phonak	Phonak
Final		Ivan Basso	Paolo Bettini	Juan Manuel Gárate	Paolo Savoldelli	Phonak	Phonak

== Final standings ==
Legend
A pink jersey	Denotes the winner of the General classification	A green jersey	Denotes the winner of the Mountains classification
A violet jersey	Denotes the winner of the Points classification	A blue jersey	Denotes the winner of the Combination classification

=== General classification ===
	Cyclist	Team	Time
1	Ivan Basso (ITA)	Team CSC	91h 33' 36"
2	José Enrique Gutiérrez (ESP)	Phonak	+9' 18"
3	Gilberto Simoni (ITA)	Saunier Duval–Prodir	+11' 59"
4	Damiano Cunego (ITA)	Lampre–Fondital	+18' 16"
5	Paolo Savoldelli (ITA)	Discovery Channel	+19' 22"
6	Sandy Casar (FRA)	Française des Jeux	+23' 53"
7	Juan Manuel Gárate (ESP)	Quick-Step–Innergetic	+24' 26"
8	Franco Pellizotti (ITA)	Liquigas	+25' 57"
9	Víctor Hugo Peña (COL)	Phonak	+26' 27"
10	Patxi Vila (ESP)	Lampre–Fondital	+27' 34"

=== Points classification ===
	Cyclist	Team	Points
1	Paolo Bettini (ITA)	Quick-Step–Innergetic	169
2	Ivan Basso (ITA)	Team CSC	158
3	José Enrique Gutiérrez (ESP)	Phonak	132
4	Olaf Pollack (GER)	T-Mobile Team	104
5	Paolo Savoldelli (ITA)	Discovery Channel	95
6	Stefan Schumacher (GER)	Gerolsteiner	89
7	Gilberto Simoni (ITA)	Saunier Duval–Prodir	88
8	Leonardo Piepoli (ITA)	Saunier Duval–Prodir	86
9	Maximiliano Richeze (ARG)	Ceramica Panaria–Navigare	68
10	Franco Pellizotti (ITA)	Liquigas	67

=== Mountains classification ===
	Cyclist	Team	Points
1	Juan Manuel Gárate (ESP)	Quick-Step–Innergetic	64
2	Ivan Basso (ITA)	Team CSC	56
3	Fortunato Baliani (ITA)	Ceramica Panaria–Navigare	52
4	Leonardo Piepoli (ITA)	Saunier Duval–Prodir	32
5	José Enrique Gutiérrez (ESP)	Phonak	27
6	Sandy Casar (FRA)	Française des Jeux	23
7	Patxi Vila (ESP)	Lampre–Fondital	22
8	Gilberto Simoni (ITA)	Saunier Duval–Prodir	20
9	Marzio Bruseghin (ITA)	Lampre–Fondital	16
10	José Serpa (COL)	Selle Italia–Diquigiovanni	15

=== Combination classification ===
	Cyclist	Team	Points
1	Paolo Savoldelli (ITA)	Discovery Channel	775
2	José Enrique Gutiérrez (ESP)	Phonak	651
3	Ivan Basso (ITA)	Team CSC	595
4	Sandy Casar (FRA)	Française des Jeux	454
5	Paolo Bettini (ITA)	Quick-Step–Innergetic	342
6	Mickaël Delage (FRA)	Française des Jeux	307
7	Damiano Cunego (ITA)	Lampre–Fondital	301
8	Stefan Schumacher (GER)	Gerolsteiner	294
9	Danilo Di Luca (ITA)	Liquigas	242
10	Olaf Pollack (GER)	T-Mobile Team	241

=== Trofeo Fast Team classification ===
	Team	Time
1	Phonak	274h 21' 31"
2	Lampre–Fondital	+ 7' 36"
3	Discovery Channel	+ 16' 05"
4	Saunier Duval–Prodir	+ 29' 37"
5	Ceramica Panaria–Navigare	+ 53' 06"
6	Liquigas	+ 56' 12"
7	Crédit Agricole	+ 1h 22' 59"
8	Team CSC	+ 1h 31' 15"
9	Liberty Seguros–Würth	+ 1h 47' 58"
10	Caisse d'Epargne–Illes Balears	+ 1h 53' 19"

=== Trofeo Super Team classification ===
	Team	Points
1	Phonak	323
2	Saunier Duval–Prodir	298
3	Ceramica Panaria–Navigare	270
4	Gerolsteiner	262
5	Lampre–Fondital	260
6	Discovery Channel	255
7	Quick-Step–Innergetic	241
8	Liquigas	237
9	Team CSC	218
10	T-Mobile Team	211

=== Minor classifications ===
Other less well-known classifications, whose leaders did not receive a special jersey, were awarded during the Giro. Other awards included the Combativity classification, which was a compilation of points gained for position on crossing intermediate sprints, mountain passes and stage finishes. Italian Paolo Bettini won the Most Combative classification. Bettini also won the 110 Gazzetta classification. The Azzurri d'Italia classification was based on finishing order, but points were awarded only to the top three finishers in each stage. Ivan Basso won the Azzurri d'Italia classification. The Trofeo Fuga Piaggio classification rewarded riders who took part in a breakaway at the head of the field, each rider in an escape of ten or fewer riders getting one point for each kilometre that the group stayed clear. The classification was won by Christophe Edaleine. Teams were given penalty points for minor technical infringements. Ceramica Panaria–Navigare were most successful in avoiding penalties, and so won the Fair Play classification.
