= Robert Förster =

German cyclist

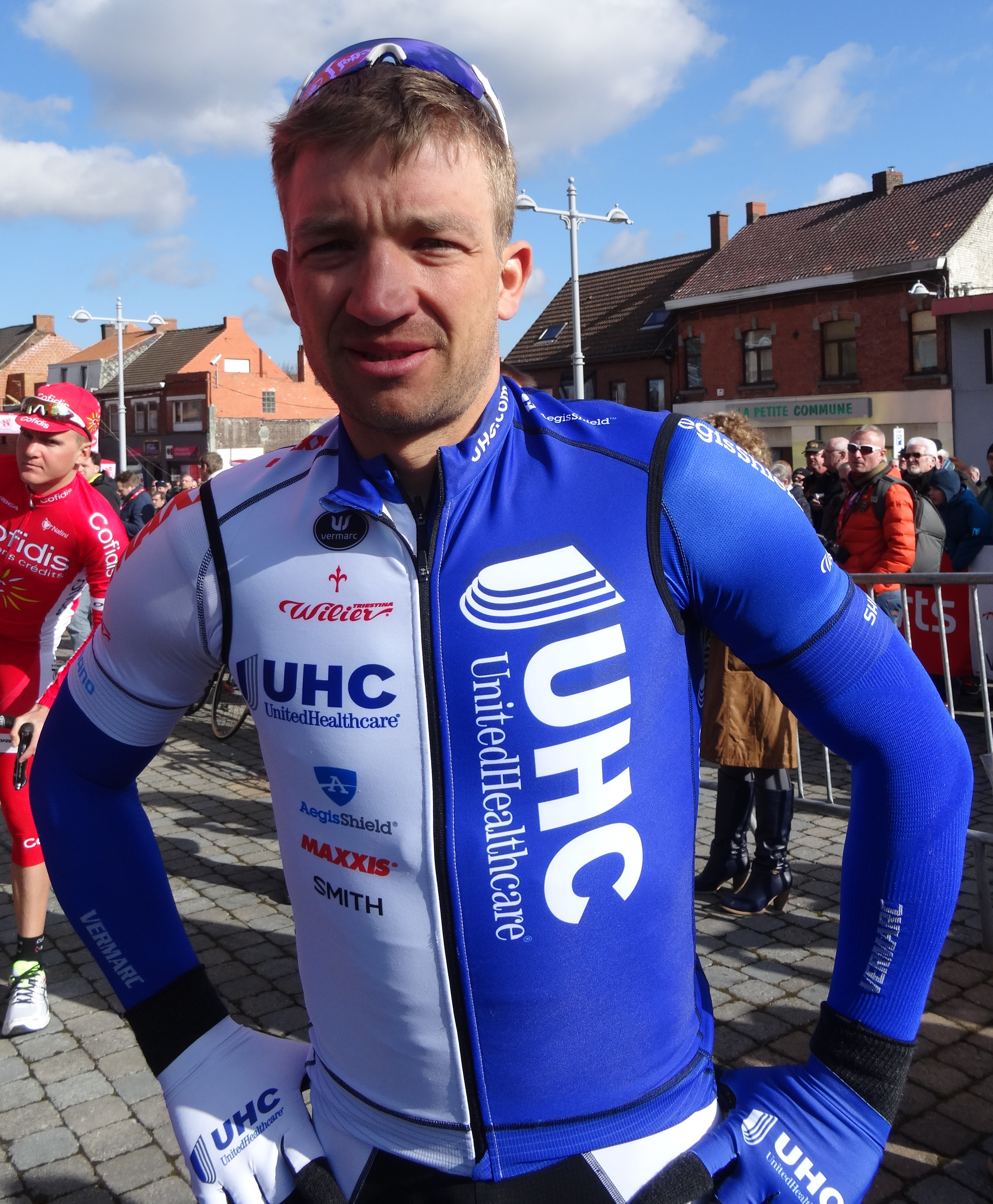
- Förster in 2015

Personal information
- Full name: Robert Förster
- Born: 27 January 1978 (age 48) Markkleeberg, Bezirk Leipzig, East Germany
- Height: 177 cm (5 ft 10 in)
- Weight: 81 kg (179 lb)

Cycling career
- Sport: Cycling
- Current team: Retired
- Discipline: Road
- Role: Rider
- Rider type: Sprinter

Professional teams
- 2001–2002: Team Nürnberger
- 2003–2008: Gerolsteiner
- 2009–2010: Team Milram
- 2011–2015: UnitedHealthcare

Major wins
- Grand Tours Giro d'Italia 3 individual stages (2006, 2007) Vuelta a España 1 individual stage (2006)

Robert Förster (born 27 January 1978) is a German former professional road racing cyclist. He specialized in bunch sprints.

He turned professional in 2001, initially riding for Team Nürnberger.

His career highlights have been wins in the final (Museo del Ghisallo–Milan) stage 21 of the Giro d'Italia 2006, and stage 15 (Motilla del Palancar – Ford factory, Almussafes) of the 2006 Vuelta.

== Major results ==
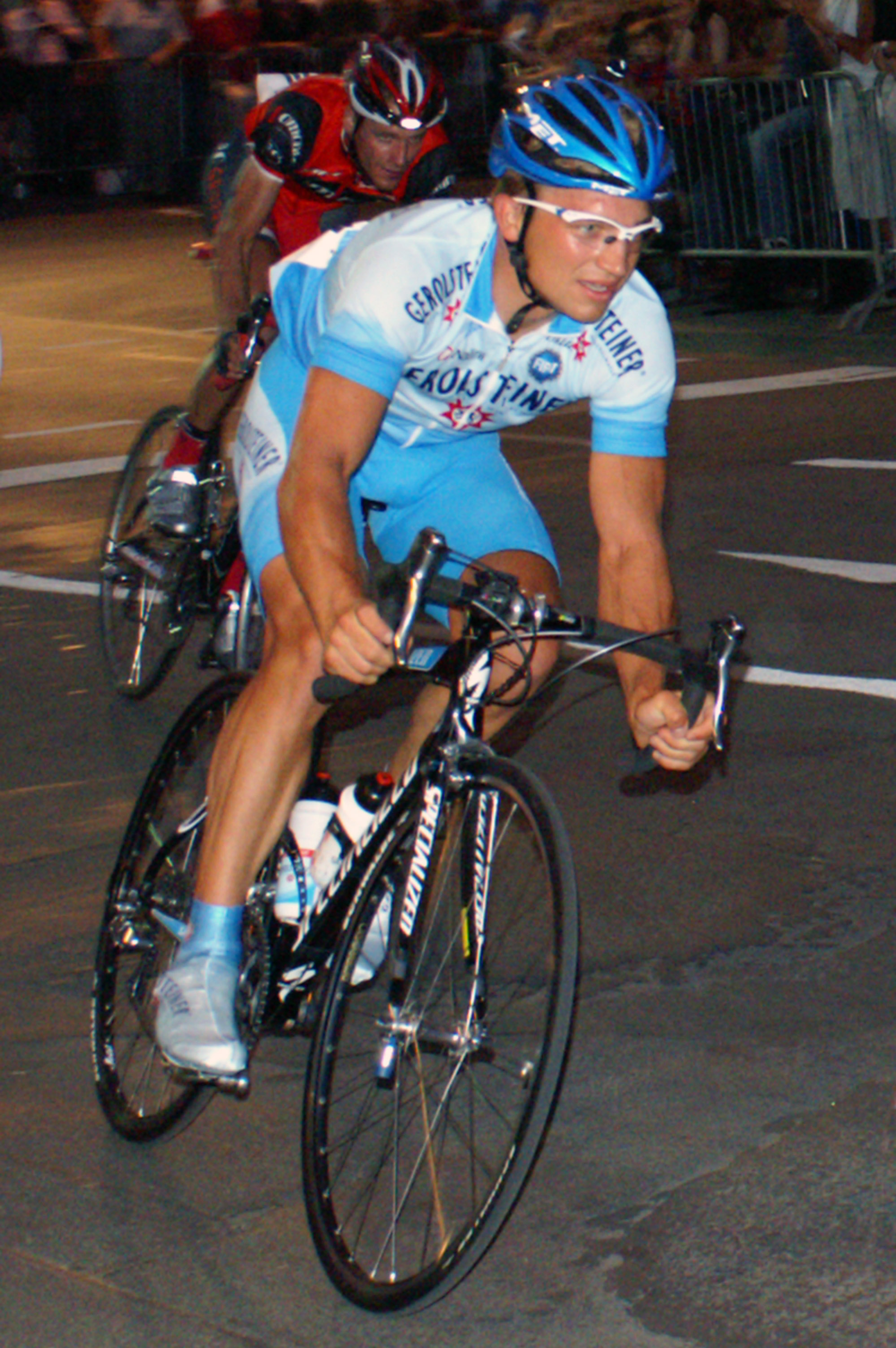
Förster in 2005

1998
1st Stage 3b Vuelta a Guatemala
2001
Sachsen Tour

1st Stages 1 & 3

1st Stage 4a Hessen-Rundfahrt
1st Stage 4 Troféu Joaquim Agostinho
2002
1st Stage 3 Sachsen Tour
1st Stage 6 Circuito Montañés
2003
1st Stage 1 Rheinland-Pfalz Rundfahrt
1st Groningen-Münster
9th Classic Haribo
2004
1st Groningen-Münster
10th Classic Haribo
2005
1st Stage 4 Niedersachsen-Rundfahrt
2nd Road race, National Road Championships
2006
1st Stage 20 Giro d'Italia
1st Stage 15 Vuelta a España
Danmark Rundt

1st Stages 3 & 6

1st Stage 1 Circuit de la Sarthe
1st Stage 5 Ster Elektrotoer
2nd Trofeo Cala Millor
7th Doha International GP
2007
Giro d'Italia

1st Stages 3 & 5

1st Stage 1 Deutschland Tour
1st Stage 4 Settimana Internazionale di Coppi e Bartali
1st Points classification Circuit de la Sarthe
5th Neuseen Classics
6th Trofeo Mallorca
6th Münsterland Giro
2008
1st Dutch Food Valley Classic
Volta ao Algarve

1st Stages 1 & 3

1st Stage 6 Tour de Pologne
3rd Trofeo Mallorca
3rd Münsterland Giro
2009
1st Stage 7 Tour of Turkey
4th Ronde van het Groene Hart
4th Schaal Sels
2010
3rd Scheldeprijs
4th Trofeo Cala Millor
10th Trofeo Palma de Mallorca
10th Rund um Köln
2011
Nature Valley Grand Prix

1st Stages 3 & 4

1st Stage 8 Tour de Langkawi
1st Stage 2a Vuelta a Asturias
1st Stage 4 Tour of Qinghai Lake
3rd Philadelphia International Championship
8th Clásica de Almería
2012
1st Clarendon Cup
3rd Neuseen Classics
4th Overall Tour of Elk Grove
8th Philadelphia International Championship
2013
1st Stage 6 Tour of Qinghai Lake
