= Juan Manuel Gárate =

Spanish cyclist (born 1976)

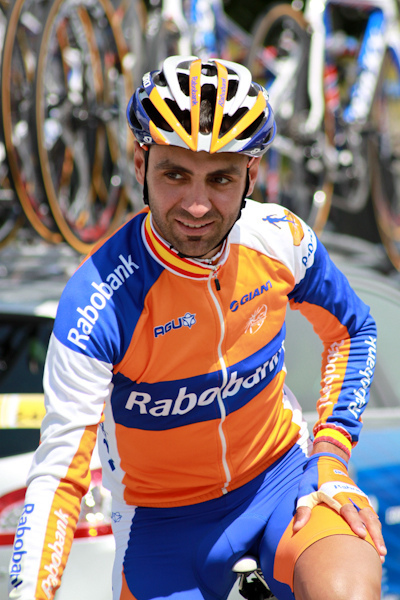
- Gárate at the 2011 Critérium du Dauphiné

Personal information
- Full name: Juan Manuel Gárate Cepa
- Born: 24 April 1976 (age 50) Irun, Spain
- Height: 1.74 m (5 ft 9 in)
- Weight: 62 kg (137 lb)

Cycling career
- Sport: Cycling
- Discipline: Road
- Role: Rider
- Rider type: Climber

Professional teams
- 2000–2004: Lampre–Daikin
- 2005: Saunier Duval–Prodir
- 2006–2008: Quick-Step–Innergetic
- 2009–2014: Rabobank

Major wins
- Grand Tours Tour de France 1 individual stage (2009) Giro d'Italia Mountains classification (2006) 1 individual stage (2006) Vuelta a España 1 individual stage (2001) One-Day Races and Classics National Road Race Championship (2005) Clásica de San Sebastián (2007)

Juan Manuel Gárate Cepa (born 24 April 1976 in Irun) is a Spanish professional road racing cyclist, who last rode for the Belkin Pro Cycling team. He is perceived to be a climbing specialist, and to date his greatest achievements have been in the Giro d'Italia, where he placed fourth overall in 2002, tenth overall in the 2004, fifth overall in 2005 and won the Mountains classification with a seventh overall at the 2006 Giro d'Italia. He also won the Spanish National Championship road race in 2005. He has also won stages in the Tour de Suisse, the Vuelta a España, the Giro del Trentino and more recently he finished first on Mont Ventoux in the penultimate stage of the Tour de France 2009.

In February 2014, it was announced that Gárate had backed out of a contract with Belkin Pro Cycling.

== Career achievements ==
=== Major results ===
2001
1st Stage 14 Vuelta a España
7th Overall Tour de Suisse
2002
1st Stage 7 Tour de Suisse
1st Stage 3 Giro del Trentino
4th Overall Giro d'Italia
2004
10th Overall Giro d'Italia
2005
1st Road race, National Road Championships
5th Overall Giro d'Italia
5th Overall Vuelta a Andalucía

1st Mountains classification
1st Sprints classification

2006
7th Overall Giro d'Italia

1st Mountains classification
1st Stage 19

2007
1st Clásica de San Sebastián
National Road Championships

5th Road race
7th Time trial

2008
5th Overall Vuelta a Andalucía
6th Overall Paris–Nice
7th Overall Tour de Romandie
2009
1st Stage 20 Tour de France
2011
9th Overall Vuelta a Castilla y León

=== Grand Tour general classification results timeline ===
Grand Tour	2000	2001	2002	2003	2004	2005	2006	2007	2008	2009	2010	2011	2012	2013
Giro d'Italia	—	20	4	—	10	5	7	—	37	—	—	—	59	31
Tour de France	—	—	—	—	—	66	72	21	—	62	35	DNF	—	—
/ Vuelta a España	62	37	DNF	69	23	—	—	30	15	38	46	66	42	71

Legend
—	Did not compete
DNF	Did not finish
