= Sandy Casar =

French cyclist

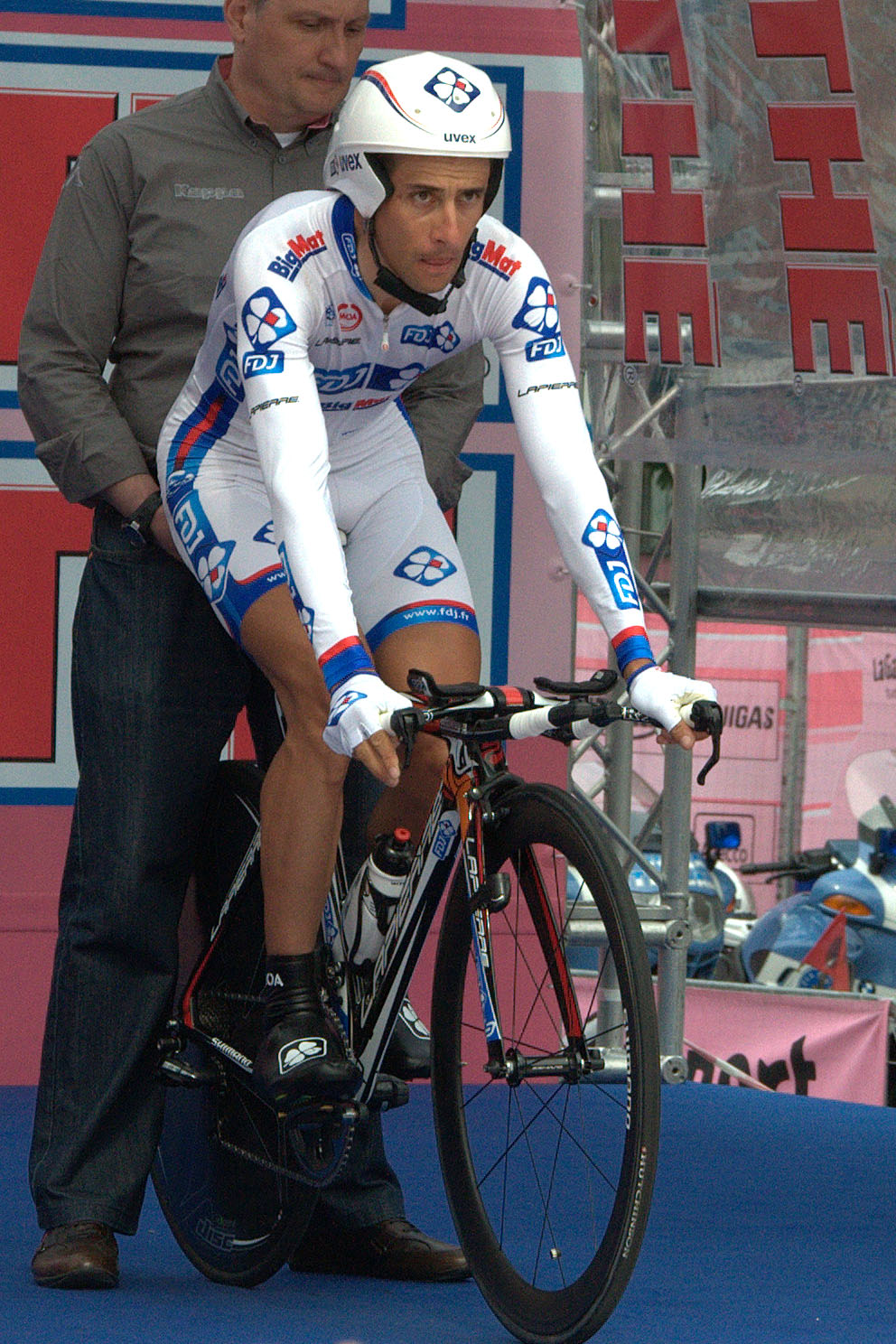
- Casar at the 2012 Giro d'Italia

Personal information
- Full name: Sandy Casar
- Born: 2 February 1979 (age 47) Mantes-la-Jolie, France
- Height: 1.77 m (5 ft 10 in)
- Weight: 70 kg (154 lb)

Cycling career
- Sport: Cycling
- Current team: Retired
- Discipline: Road
- Role: Rider
- Rider type: Breakaway Specialist

Professional team
- 2000–2013: Française des Jeux

Major wins
- Tour de France, 3 stages Route du Sud (2005); Paris–Camembert (2011)

Sandy Casar (born 2 February 1979) is a French former professional racing cyclist, who competed as a professional between 2000 and 2013, all for the Française des Jeux team. His greatest results have been winning three stages of the Tour de France, as well the overall classification of the Route du Sud in 2005. He also won the one-day race Paris–Camembert in 2011.

== Career ==
Born in Mantes-la-Jolie, Yvelines, Casar turned professional in 2000 after riding for Jean Floch-Mantes as an amateur. Casar's talent was revealed in Paris–Nice 2002, which he finished second at 23 years old. He finished 13th in the 2003 Giro d'Italia, in front of climber Marco Pantani. He had his biggest win in a stage of the 2003 Tour de Suisse. He then finished 16th in the 2004 Tour de France, and sixth in the 2006 Giro d'Italia, 25 minutes behind winner Ivan Basso. Casar also won the Route du Sud in 2005.

On 27 July 2007, he won his first Tour de France stage, beating Laurent Lefèvre, Axel Merckx and Michael Boogerd in a sprint after a collision with a dog earlier in the day. He then finished 14th overall in the 2008 Tour de France.

In 2009, Casar finished second in the 16th stage of the 2009 Tour de France. Stage 16 was originally won by Mikel Astarloza. However, Astarloza was found after the Tour to have tested positive for EPO before the race had started. The organisers stripped him of the stage win and Casar became the official stage winner. Casar later finished 11th overall that year.

In 2010, Casar won the stage 9 of the 2010 Tour de France, after being part of a long breakaway that went over numerous categorized climb, including the Col de la Madeleine. The breakaway was down to only four units in the descent of the col, and got caught in the final kilometer by Andy Schleck and Alberto Contador, who had escaped from the main group on the Madeleine. Casar won the uphill sprint to take the prestigious victory in one of the toughest stages of that year's Tour. In 2011, he won the Paris–Camembert classic, again after being part of a long breakaway. He tried to escape on a slope near the end, but was caught by four riders. He nonetheless prevailed in the sprint against these four, taking the win on the roads he trained on in his youth.

On 6 September 2013, Casar announced his retirement from cycling.

== Career achievements ==
=== Major results ===
2000
5th Overall Tour Down Under
2001
7th Trophée des Grimpeurs
8th Tour du Haut Var
2002
1st Stage 4 Circuit Franco-Belge
2nd Overall Paris–Nice

1st Young Rider Classification

3rd Paris–Camembert Lepetit
10th Trophée des Grimpeurs
2003
1st Stage 4 Tour de Suisse
2nd GP Le Télégramme
4th Paris–Camembert Lepetit
7th Route Adélie de Vitré
2004
1st Stage 2 Tour du Poitou Charentes et de la Vienne
2nd Overall Route du Sud
3rd Duo Normand (with Carlos Da Cruz)
4th Paris–Camembert Lepetit
8th Overall Tour du Languedoc-Roussillon
8th Overall Circuit de la Sarthe
2005
1st Overall Route du Sud
3rd Paris–Camembert Lepetit
5th Grand Prix d'Ouverture La Marseillaise
6th Overall GP Internacional Paredes Rota dos Móveis
2006
5th Overall Route du Sud
6th Overall Giro d'Italia
2007
1st Stage 18 Tour de France
2008
3rd Polynormande
6th Overall Tour de Romandie
8th Overall Vuelta al País Vasco
2009
1st Stage 16 Tour de France
2010
1st Stage 9 Tour de France
6th Overall Vuelta al País Vasco
2011
1st Paris–Camembert
3rd Tour du Finistère
5th Overall Route du Sud
2012
4th Overall Tour of Oman

=== Grand Tour general classification results timeline ===
Grand Tour	2002	2003	2004	2005	2006	2007	2008	2009	2010	2011	2012	2013
Giro d'Italia	—	13	—	81	6	—	—	—	—	—	25	DNF
Tour de France	83	111	16	29	69	71	13	10	25	27	22	—
Vuelta a España	—	—	—	—	—	—	19	DNF	—	—	—	—
