= Labastide-d'Armagnac =

- Commune
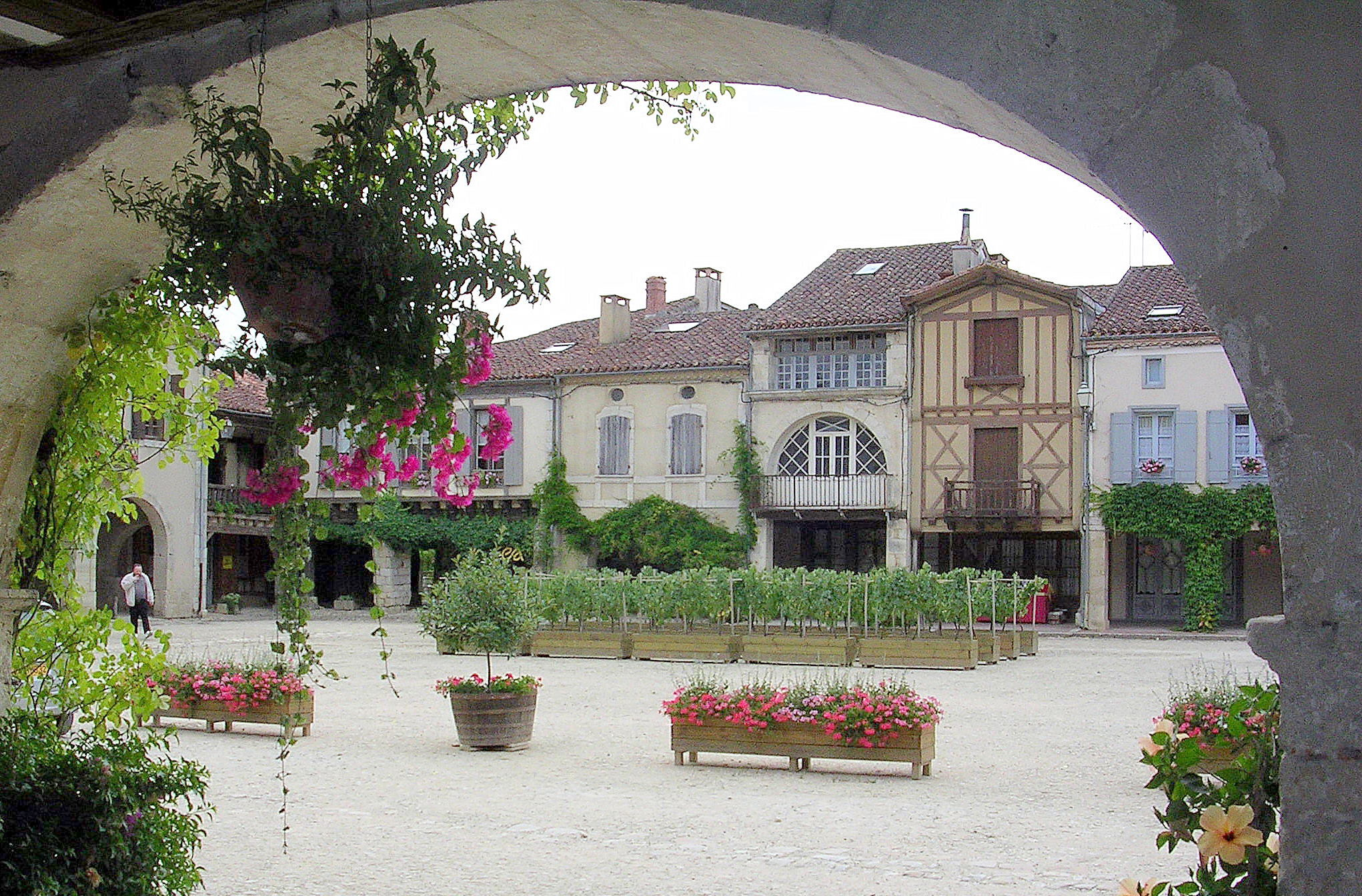
- The main square in Labastide-d'Armagnac

- Coat of arms
- Location of Labastide-d'Armagnac
- Location within France Location within Nouvelle-Aquitaine
- Coordinates: 43°58′13″N 0°11′06″W
- Country: France
- Region: Nouvelle-Aquitaine
- Department: Landes
- Arrondissement: Mont-de-Marsan
- Canton: Haute Lande Armagnac
- Intercommunality: Landes d'Armagnac

Government
  - Mayor (2020–2026): Alain Gaube
- Area^{1}: 31.87 km^{2} (12.31 sq mi)
- Elevation: 94 m (308 ft)
- Highest elevation: 139 m (456 ft)
- Lowest elevation: 67 m (220 ft)
- Population (2023): 673
  - Density: 21.1/km^{2} (54.7/sq mi)
- Time zone: UTC+01:00 (CET)
  - Summer (DST): UTC+02:00 (CEST)
- INSEE/Postal code: 40131 /40240
- ^{1} French Land Register data, which excludes lakes, ponds, glaciers > 1 km^{2} (0.386 sq mi or 247 acres) and river estuaries.

Labastide-d'Armagnac (French pronunciation: [labastid daʁmaɲak]; Occitan: La Bastida d'Armanhac) is a commune in the Landes department in Nouvelle-Aquitaine in south-western France.

It hosts Notre Dame des Cyclistes. It was founded in 1291 by Bernard VI, Count of Armagnac.

== See also ==
- Communes of the Landes department
