= Philipp Ludescher =

Austrian racing cyclist

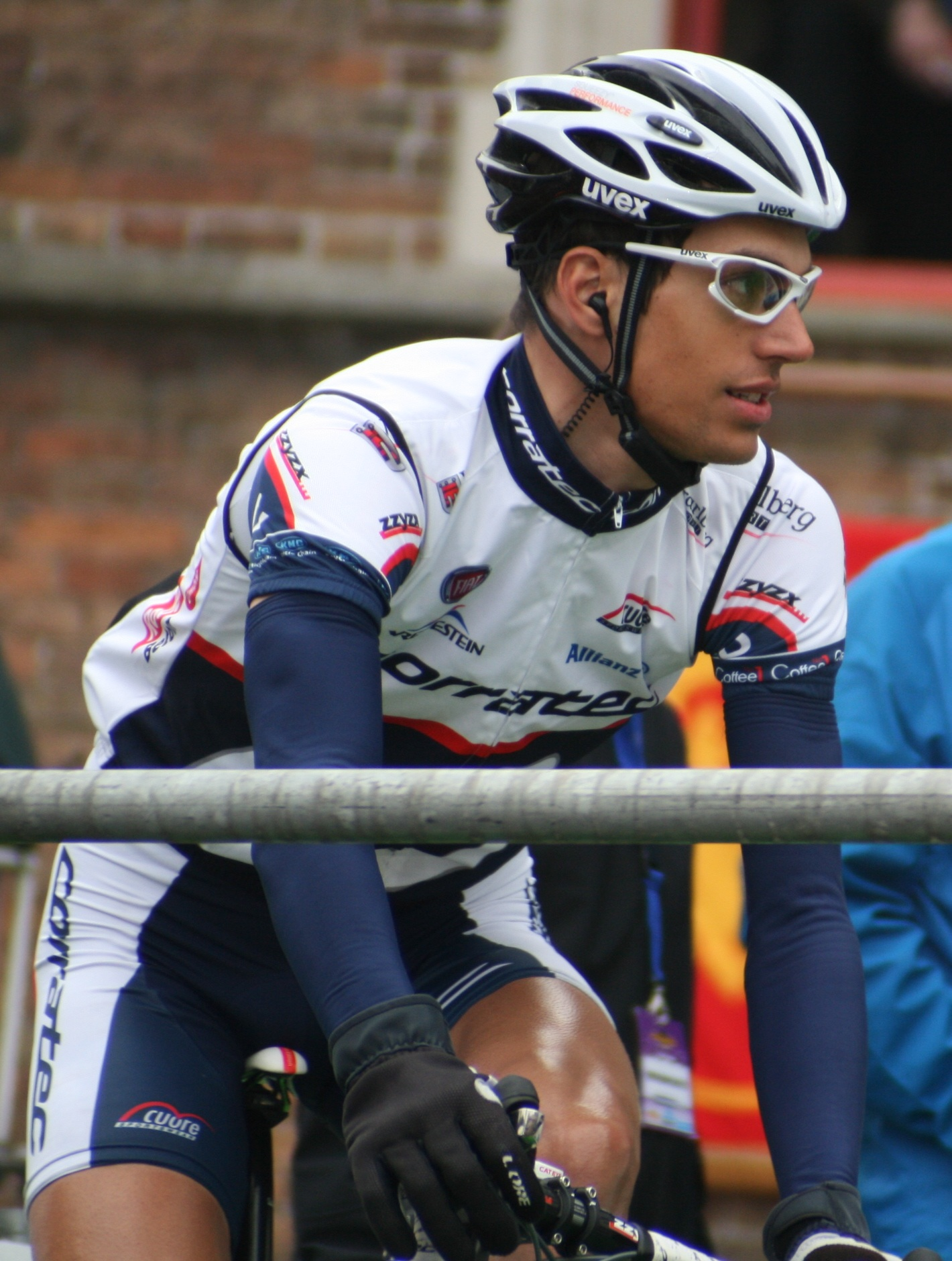

Personal information
- Full name: Philipp Ludescher
- Born: 3 January 1987 (age 39) Feldkirch, Austria

Cycling career
- Sport: Cycling
- Current team: Retired
- Disciplines: Road; Cyclo-cross
- Role: Rider

Professional team
- 2006–2010: Vorarlberger

Philipp Ludescher (born 3 January 1987) is an Austrian former professional racing cyclist.

== Major results ==
2003
1st Road race, National Youth Road Championships
1st Youth race, National Cyclo-cross Championships
