= José Enrique Gutiérrez =

Spanish road bicycle racer

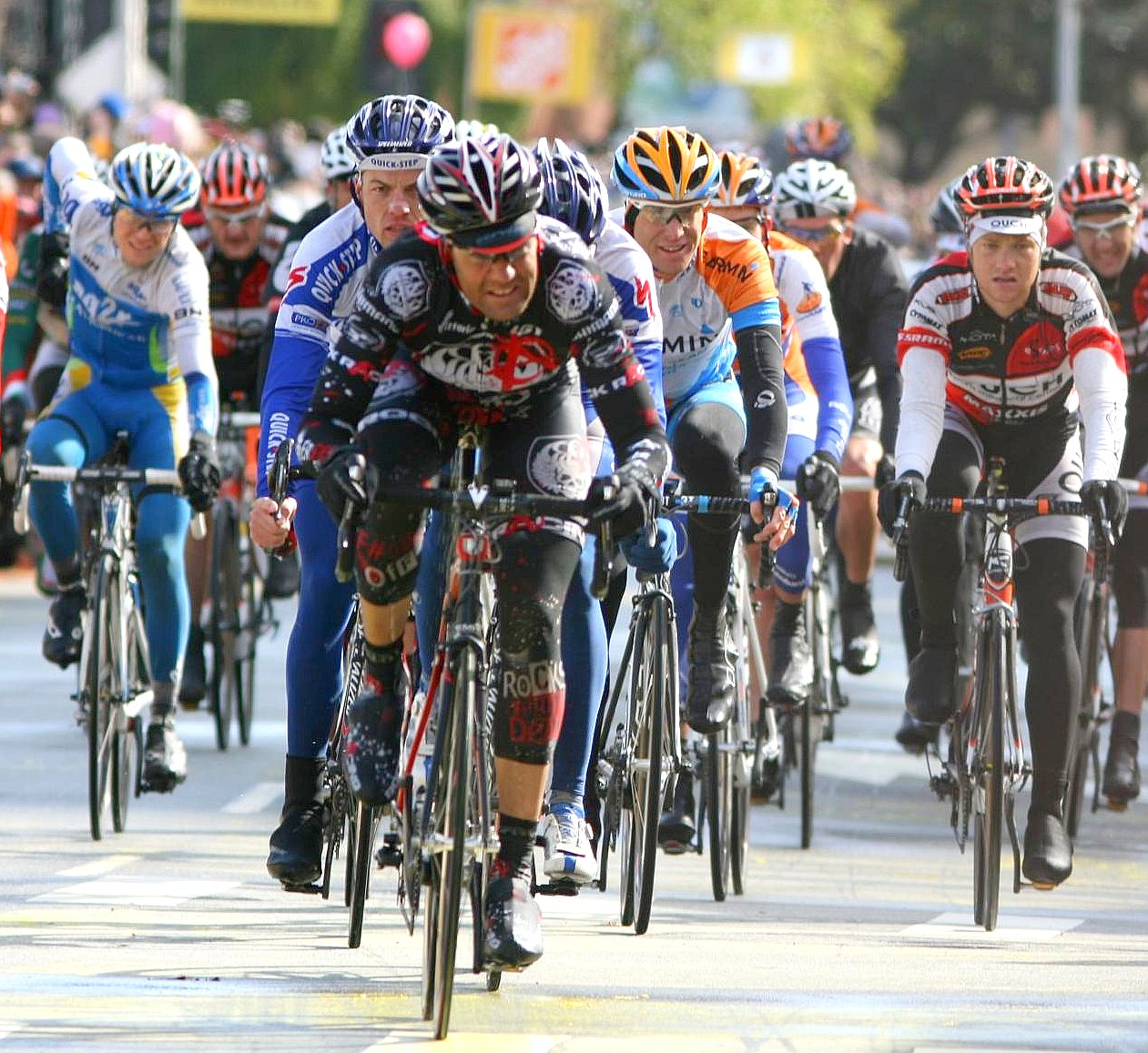

Personal information
- Full name: José Enrique Gutiérrez Cataluña
- Born: 18 June 1974 (age 52) Valencia, Spain
- Height: 1.89 m (6 ft 2 in)
- Weight: 78 kg (172 lb; 12.3 st)

Cycling career
- Sport: Cycling
- Current team: Retired
- Discipline: Road
- Role: Rider
- Rider type: Climbing specialist

Professional teams
- 1998–2003: Kelme–Costa Blanca
- 2004–2006: Phonak
- 2007–2008: Team LPR
- 2009–2010: Rock Racing
- 2011–2012: Gobernación de Antioquia–Indeportes Antioquia

Major wins
- Grand Tours Vuelta a España 1 individual stage (2004) One-day races and Classics National Time Trial Championships (1997)

José Enrique Gutiérrez Cataluña (born 18 June 1974) is a Spanish former professional road racing cyclist. His career highlights include second place overall at the 2006 Giro d'Italia, winning a stage of the Vuelta a España and two stages at the Dauphiné Libéré.

Gutiérrez's name was brought up in the 2006 Operación Puerto doping case, and he was immediately made "non-active" (although not, according to team manager John Lelangue, suspended or fired) and so did not compete in any further events in 2006. Due to the Floyd Landis doping case of the 2006 Tour de France, Phonak withdrew their sponsorship of the team and it hence folded. Gutiérrez then moved down a division to Team LPR.

In 2010, Gutiérrez retired, but later came out of retirement to ride for Gobernación de Antioquia–Indeportes Antioquia in 2011.

== Major results ==
1997
1st Time trial, National Road Championships
2000
Giro d'Italia

Held after Stage 8

2001
5th Gran Premio de Llodio
2002
1st Stage 7 Critérium du Dauphiné Libéré
4th Classique des Alpes
6th Paris–Tours
2003
3rd Overall Giro della Provincia di Lucca
2004
1st Stage 20 Vuelta a Espana
3rd Classique des Alpes
6th Overall Critérium du Dauphiné Libéré

1st Combination classification
1st Stage 2

6th Overall Clásica Internacional de Alcobendas
2005
5th Overall Escalada a Montjuïc
2006
2nd Overall Giro d'Italia
4th Overall Tour de Georgia
2007
5th Monte Paschi Eroica
5th Grand Prix de Wallonie
6th Grand Prix de Fourmies
2009
7th Overall Vuelta a la Comunidad de Madrid
10th Overall Vuelta Mexico Telmex
2011
1st Stage 3 (TTT) Vuelta a Colombia

=== Grand Tour general classification results timeline ===
Grand Tour	1998	1999	2000	2001	2002	2003	2004	2005	2006
Giro d'Italia	DNF	—	DNF	—	—	—	—	—	2
Tour de France	—	—	—	25	29	41	28	49	—
/ Vuelta a España	—	—	36	DNF	DNF	34	31	DNF	—

Legend
—	Did not compete
DNF	Did not finish
