= Klein-Sinaai =

- Village
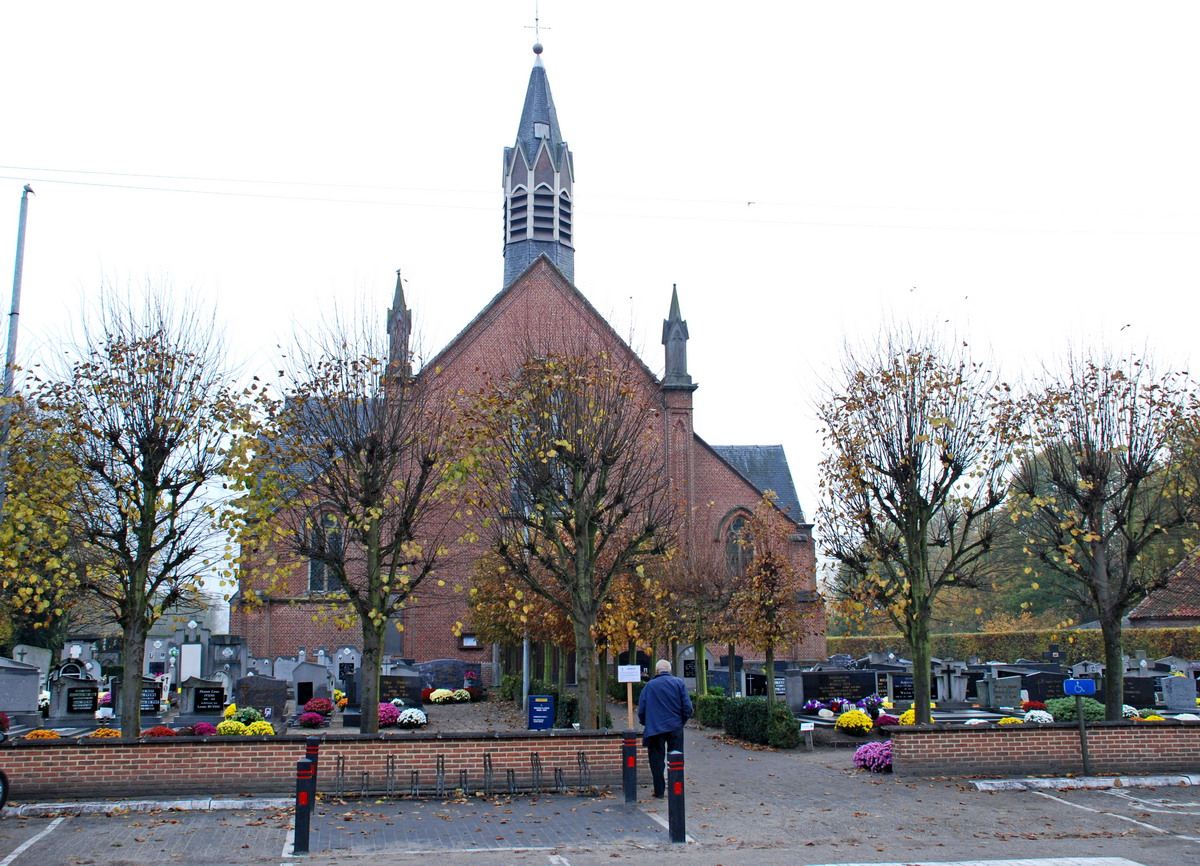
- Parish Church of Our Lady in Klein-Sinaai

- Location in Belgium
- Coordinates: 51.1802°N 3.9879°E
- Country: Belgium
- Region: Flemish Region
- Province: East Flanders
- Municipality: Stekene

Area
  - Total: 4.70 km^{2} (1.81 sq mi)

Population (2021)
  - Total: 1,381
  - Density: 294/km^{2} (761/sq mi)
- Time zone: CET

Klein-Sinaai is a village near the Dutch border in the Belgian municipality of Stekene in the province of East Flanders. Until 1977 it was a part of the municipality of Sinaai.

In Klein-Sinaai are the remains of Abbey of Boudelo (also known as Boudeloo Abbey), formerly a monastery of the Cistercians. The abbey was founded in 1197 when Baldwin of Boucle, a monk from St. Peter's Abbey in Ghent, settled in Klein-Sinaai as a hermit. In the early 13th century the abbey was recognised by the Bishop of Doornik. In 1578 the abbey was destroyed by Calvinists from Ghent, but was rebuilt a few years later, within the walls of Ghent itself.

The museum of cultural history in Sint-Niklaas exhibits several archaeological finds from Boudelo Abbey.

In 1877, a railway station opened on the Sint-Gillis-Waas to Zelzate railway. The line closed for passengers in 1952 and the track was removed in 1974.

== Gallery ==
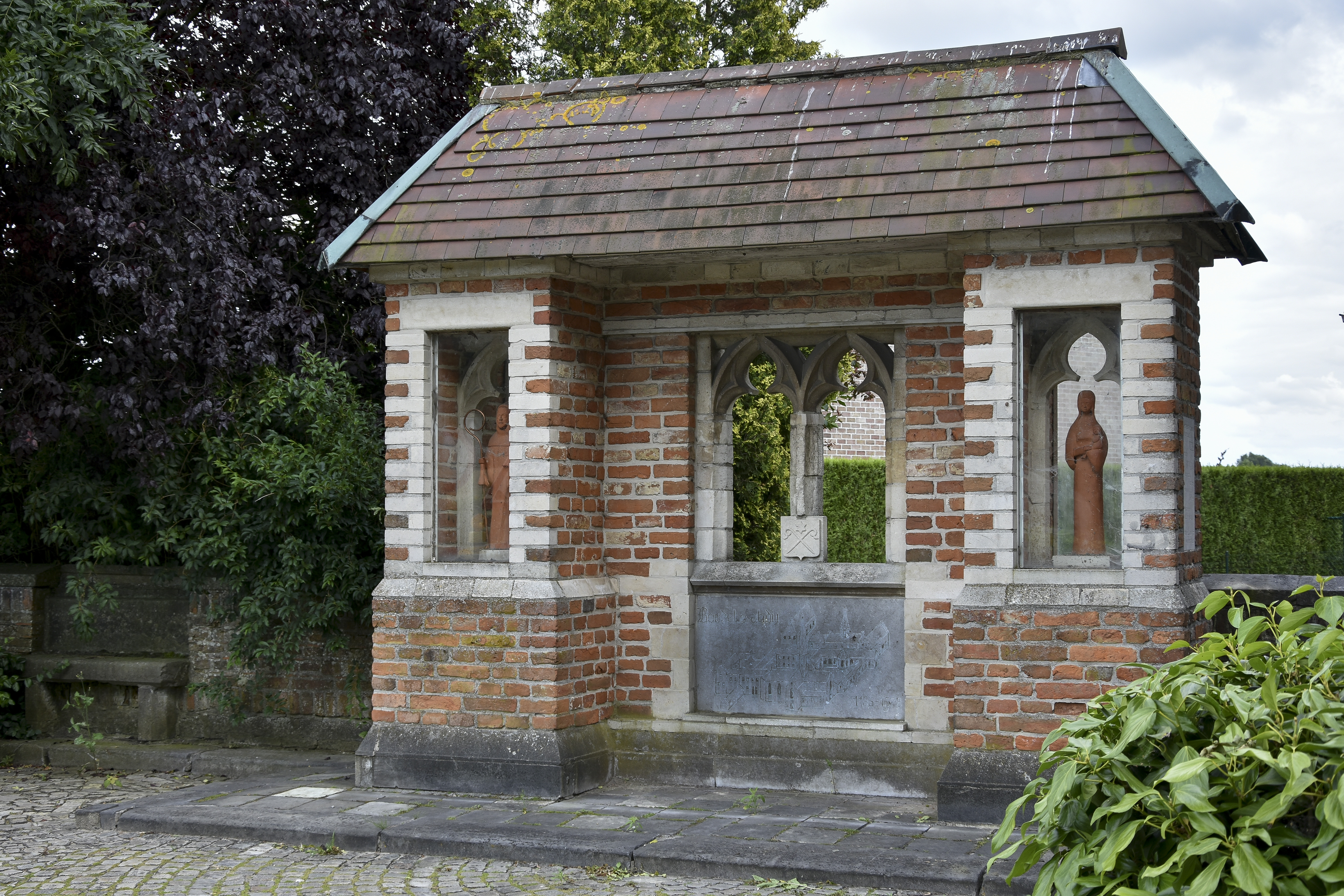
Monument to the Boudelo Abbey

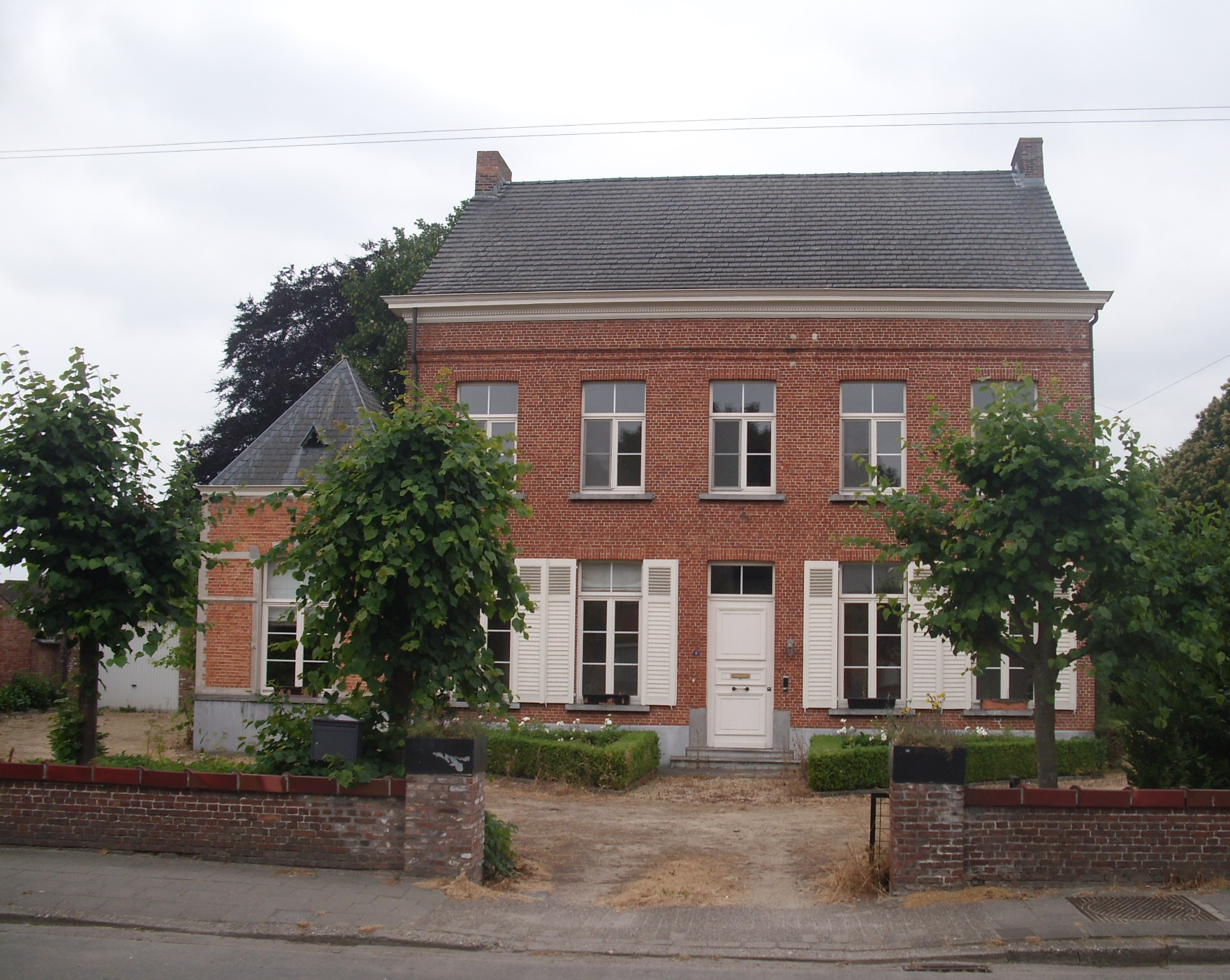
Clergy house

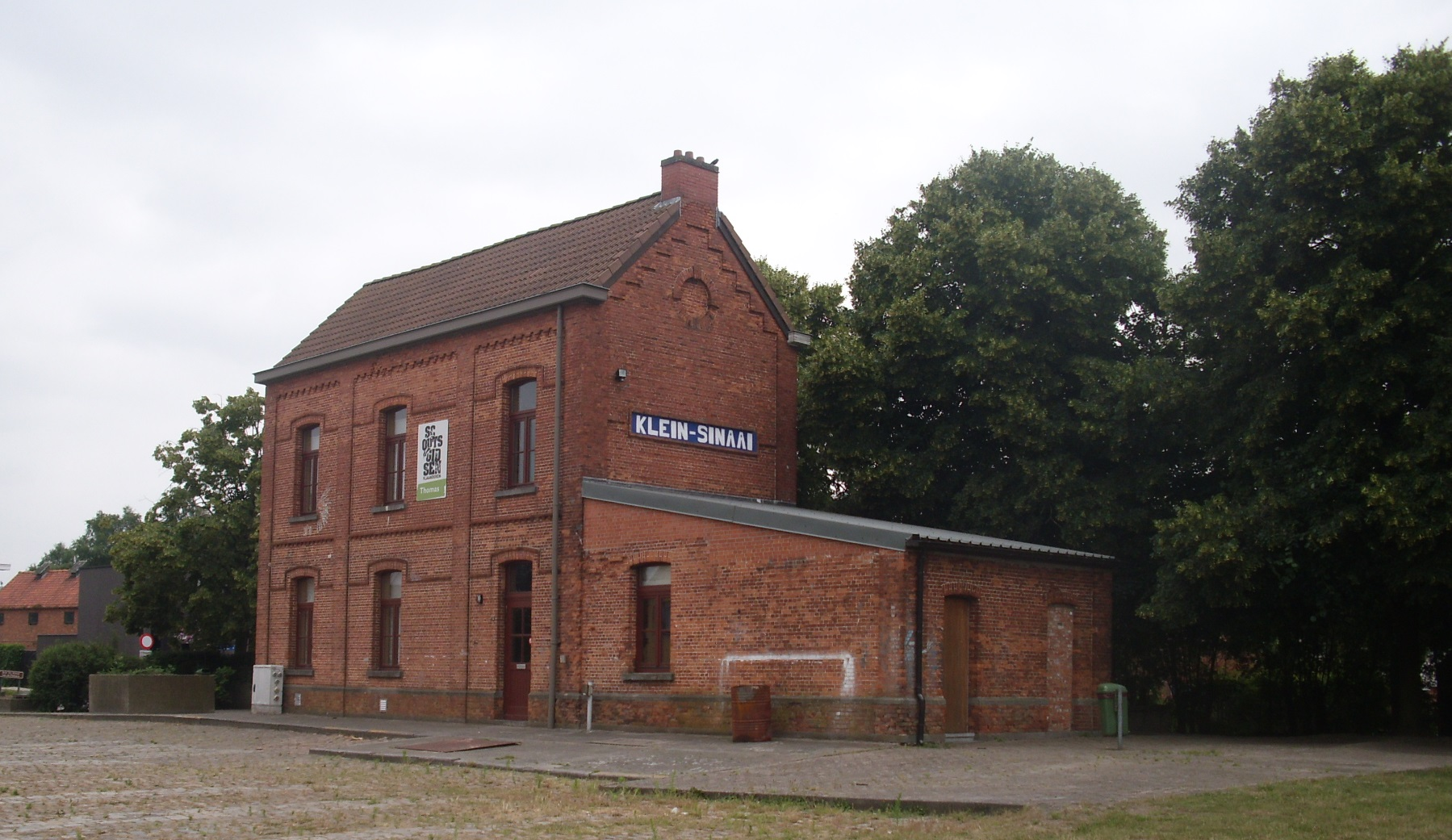
Former train station Klein Sinaai
