= Museo del Ghisallo =

Bicycle museum in Magreglio, Italy

Coordinates: 45.9240°N 9.2682°E

Madonna del Ghisallo Cycling Museum
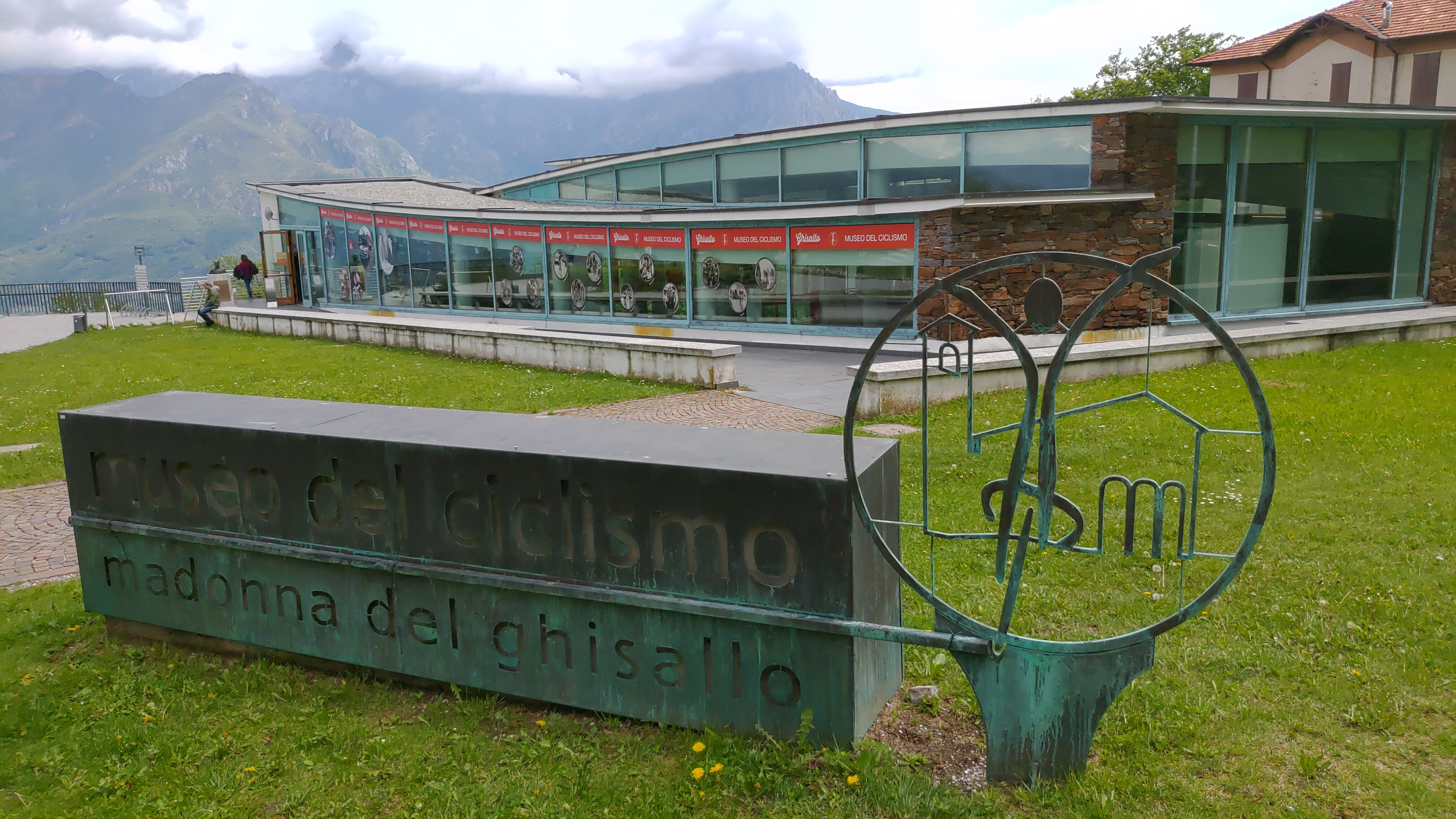
- Established: 14 October 2006
- Location: Magreglio, Italy
- Type: Bicycle museum

The Museo del Ghisallo is a bicycle museum located in Magreglio, Italy. The museum showcases a rich collection of cycling memorabilia, including bicycles, jerseys and artefacts from the history of cycling. Adjacent to the museum is the Madonna del Ghisallo chapel, which has long been a symbolic place for cyclists.

Items from famous riders like Fausto Coppi, Gino Bartali, Eddy Merckx, and Marco Pantani are displayed. It celebrates the sport’s evolution, highlighting historic races, technology advancements and the role of cycling in Italian culture.

== History ==
The Fondazione Museo del Ciclismo–Madonna del Ghisallo was established in 2000. That year, it organized a torch relay from the nearby sanctuary to the Vatican, where the torch was presented to Pope John Paul II. The museum developed partly because the cycling memorabilia accumulated at the sanctuary had outgrown the space available inside the chapel.

Fiorenzo Magni played a leading role in establishing the museum, which opened in October 2006. On 31 May 2006, Pope Benedict XVI blessed the final stone for the building, inscribed Omnia vincit amor ("Love conquers all").

== Building ==
The museum was designed by architect Davide Bergna. Its building consists of four interconnected volumes with trapezoidal plans and roofs of differing heights. Large windows face the surrounding mountains, while the interior extends across three levels arranged around a central open space.

== Collections ==
The museum covers competitive cycling, recreational riding, and the bicycle's use in everyday life. Its exhibition sections include military bicycles, bicycle manufacturing tools, the development of racing bicycles, women's cycling, para-cycling, cyclocross, and mountain biking.

According to the museum's collection description, its central display includes bicycles used by Gino Bartali in the 1938 and 1948 Tours de France, Fausto Coppi's 1942 hour-record bicycle, and the bicycle used by Fiorenzo Magni in his 1949 Tour of Flanders victory.

Other exhibits include bicycles associated with hour records set by Ercole Baldini, Francesco Moser, and Tony Rominger, along with a folding Bianchi bicycle used by the Italian Bersaglieri during the First World War. A collection of Giro d'Italia pink jerseys was assembled partly in collaboration with La Gazzetta dello Sport.

The museum also displays historic newspapers and cycling films, maintains a library, and hosts temporary exhibitions. A memorial section commemorates cyclists who have died.
