= Magreglio =

Magreglio Magrei (Lombard)
- Comune
- Comune di Magreglio
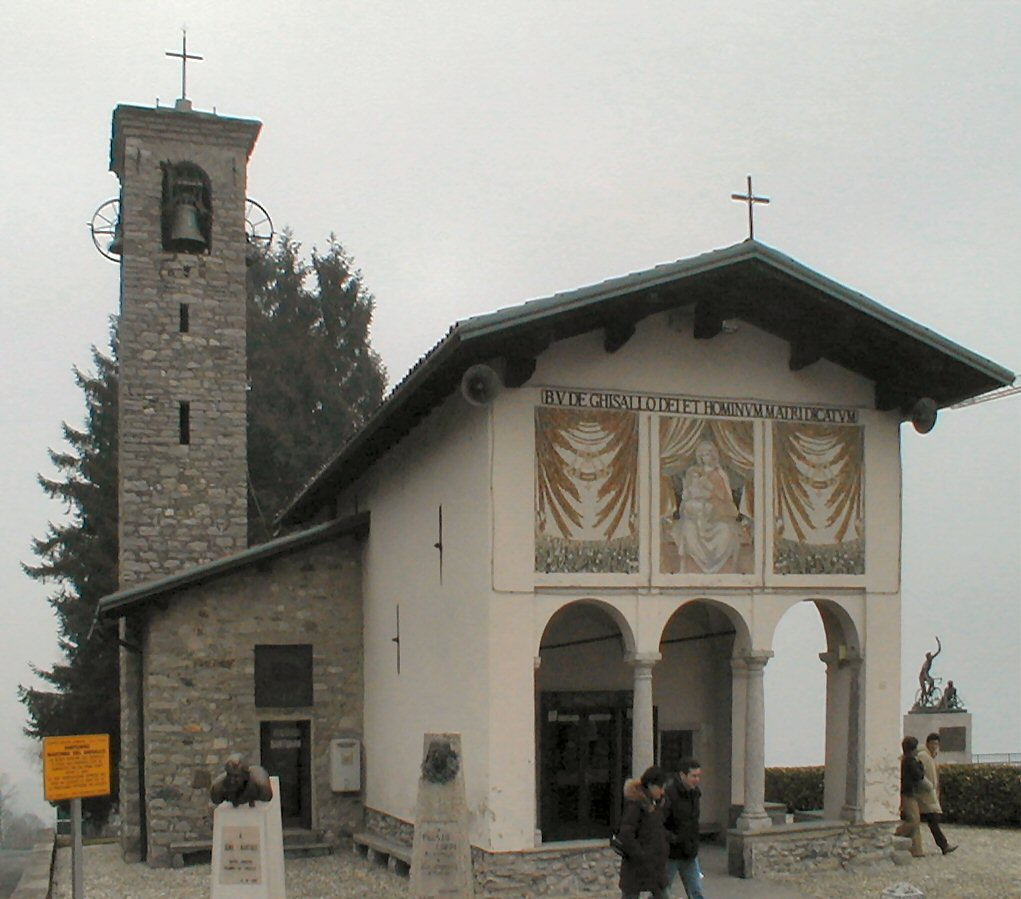
- Church of Madonna del Ghisallo

- Coat of arms

- Location within Italy Location within Lombardy
- Coordinates: 45°55′N 9°16′E
- Country: Italy
- Region: Lombardy
- Province: Como (CO)

Government
  - Mayor: Giovanna Arrigoni

Area
  - Total: 3 km^{2} (1.2 sq mi)
- Elevation: 658 m (2,159 ft)

Population (March 2008)
  - Total: 601
  - Density: 200/km^{2} (520/sq mi)
- Demonym(s): Magregliesi (Duturùn is the traditional name in Western Lombard)
- Time zone: UTC+1 (CET)
  - Summer (DST): UTC+2 (CEST)
- Postal code: 22030
- Dialing code: 031
- Patron saint: Saint Martha
- Saint day: 29 July

Magreglio (Valassinese Lombard: Magrei [maˈɡrɛj]) is a small town in the province of Como, Lombardy, Italy. The town is well known for the church of Madonna del Ghisallo, the patron saint of cyclists.

== Twin towns ==
- Friedberg, Germany
