= 2006 Giro d'Italia, Stage 1 to Stage 11 =

Cycling race stages

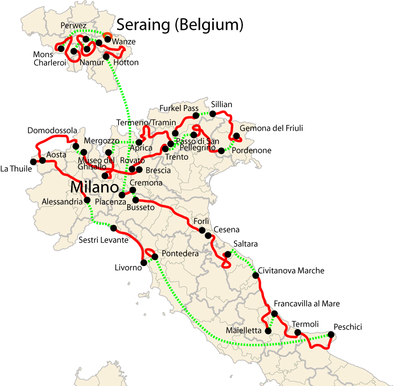
Overview of the stages; red lines represent distances covered in the individual stages, while green lines are the distances between the stages

The 2006 Giro d'Italia began on 6 May in Seraing in Belgium, and stage 11 occurred on 18 May in Pontedera. As is usually the case in a Grand Tour, the first half of the race was considerably easier than the second half – both rest days occurred before the halfway point, and there were no mountain stages or stages ending with climbs among the first eleven.

The Giro began with an individual time trial, which defending champion Paolo Savoldelli won to become the first race leader. After breakaways and the team time trial in stage 5 (the first on Italian soil) resulted in three other riders wearing the pink jersey, Ivan Basso took a lead he held all the way to the Giro's conclusion in Milan with his victory in stage 8.

Sprinter Alessandro Petacchi, who had won thirteen stages in the last two editions of the Giro, fractured his kneecap in stage 3 and was forced to abandon the Giro and miss the rest of the season.

Legend
A pink jersey	Denotes the leader of the General classification	A green jersey	Denotes the leader of the Mountains classification
A violet jersey	Denotes the leader of the Points classification	A bluejersey	Denotes the leader of the Combination classification
	s.t. indicates that the rider crossed the finish line in the same group as the one receiving the time above him, and was therefore credited with the same finishing time.		

== Stage 1 ==
6 May 2006 — Seraing (Belgium) 6.2 km (3.9 mi) (individual time trial)

The Giro began in Belgium with a short individual time trial. It was the first time the Giro had come to Belgium since 1973. The course included some climbing, with the second intermediate time check also awarding points to the mountains competition.

A number of early riders posted provisional best times on the day. The first to stand up for any sustained length of time was Stefan Schumacher's 8'03". That time held up against reigning world time trial champion Michael Rogers and other riders like José Rujano and Tom Danielson before José Enrique Gutiérrez bettered it by less than a second. Shortly afterward, Bradley McGee stopped the clock two seconds faster than Gutierrez. The only riders to follow McGee were the Giro's overall favorites and contenders. Danilo Di Luca had the best time at the first intermediate time check, but lost time as the ride wore on and finished in 8'09". Former teammates Damiano Cunego and Gilberto Simoni, though neither of them renowned as particularly good time trialists, both finished in 8'16", with Cunego milliseconds the better of the two. Ivan Basso turned in an 8'13" ride to place himself better than Simoni and Cunego in the first general classification.

With only defending Giro champion Paolo Savoldelli left to leave the starthouse, McGee's 8'01" was still best and it appeared that the Australian would get the first pink jersey. Savoldelli, however, set by far the best time at the intermediate time checks and was 11 seconds better than McGee at the finish, winning the stage and all four jerseys on the podiums afterward. Savoldelli was the only rider to finish the course in under eight minutes. McGee expressed disappointment after the stage that the last man had beaten him, but also recognized that Savoldelli had turned in the considerably better ride. For his part, Savoldelli was surprised by his victory, and felt poised to challenge for a third Giro victory.

Stage 1 result and general classification after stage 1

	Rider	Team	Time
1	Paolo Savoldelli (ITA)	Discovery Channel	7' 50"
2	Bradley McGee (AUS)	Française des Jeux	+ 11"
3	José Enrique Gutiérrez (ESP)	Phonak	+ 13"
4	Stefan Schumacher (GER)	Gerolsteiner	+ 13"
5	Serhiy Honchar (UKR)	T-Mobile Team	+ 15"
6	Francisco Pérez (ESP)	Caisse d'Epargne–Illes Balears	+ 16"
7	Iván Gutiérrez (ESP)	Caisse d'Epargne–Illes Balears	+ 16"
8	Michael Rogers (AUS)	T-Mobile Team	+ 17"
9	Davide Rebellin (ITA)	Gerolsteiner	+ 18"
10	Danilo Di Luca (ITA)	Liquigas	+ 19"

== Stage 2 ==
7 May 2006 — Mons (Belgium) to Charleroi Marcinelle (Belgium) 197 km (122 mi)

The first road race stage was flat and raced on relatively straight roads, with a very wide final 2 km (1.2 mi). It was a simple course expected to produce a mass sprint finish.

The arrival site of Marcinelle demonstrated why the Giro had come to Belgium – 2006 marked the 50th anniversary of a mining accident there that killed 262 people, including 136 Italians.

Intermittent rain fell throughout the day on all parts of the course. The maximum advantage attained by the four breakaway riders (Gabriele Missaglia, Beñat Albizuri, Mickaël Delage, and Arnaud Labbe) was 6'18", and they took the intermediate sprint and the climb on offer on the stage. With 60 km (37 mi) to go, the time gap was reduced to three minutes. At this point, race leader Paolo Savoldelli's Discovery Channel team gave up the pacemaking, as the teams of the sprinters were more invested in making a timely catch of the leading group. At the 17 km (11 mi) mark, the peloton was all together again, and Team Milram and Davitamon–Lotto, working for Alessandro Petacchi and Robbie McEwen, respectively, alternately tried to take control of the race. Petacchi's last leadout man Alberto Ongarato did not maintain the pace that had been set before him in the race's final 1,500 m (4,900 ft), leading to a chaotic sprint to the line. Petacchi started his sprint with 170 m (560 ft) to go, but McEwen, who had been holding his wheel in the last 5 km (3.1 mi), came around him for the stage win. Olaf Pollack and Paolo Bettini also managed to out-sprint Petacchi, who was upset to finish just fourth. Savoldelli, celebrating his 33rd birthday, retained the race leadership.

Stage 2 result

	Rider	Team	Time
1	Robbie McEwen (AUS)	Davitamon–Lotto	4h 51' 40"
2	Olaf Pollack (GER)	T-Mobile Team	s.t.
3	Paolo Bettini (ITA)	Quick-Step–Innergetic	s.t.
4	Alessandro Petacchi (ITA)	Team Milram	s.t.
5	Leonardo Duque (COL)	Cofidis	s.t.
6	Tomas Vaitkus (LTU)	AG2R Prévoyance	s.t.
7	Alberto Loddo (ITA)	Selle Italia–Diquigiovanni	s.t.
8	Koldo Fernández (ESP)	Euskaltel–Euskadi	s.t.
9	Maximiliano Richeze (ARG)	Ceramica Panaria–Navigare	s.t.
10	Graeme Brown (AUS)	Rabobank	s.t.

General classification after stage 2

	Rider	Team	Time
1	Paolo Savoldelli (ITA)	Discovery Channel	4h 59' 30"
2	Bradley McGee (AUS)	Française des Jeux	+ 11"
3	José Enrique Gutiérrez (ESP)	Phonak	+ 13"
4	Stefan Schumacher (GER)	Gerolsteiner	+ 13"
5	Serhiy Honchar (UKR)	T-Mobile Team	+ 15"
6	Francisco Pérez (ESP)	Caisse d'Epargne–Illes Balears	+ 16"
7	Iván Gutiérrez (ESP)	Caisse d'Epargne–Illes Balears	+ 16"
8	Michael Rogers (AUS)	T-Mobile Team	+ 17"
9	Davide Rebellin (ITA)	Gerolsteiner	+ 18"
10	Danilo Di Luca (ITA)	Liquigas	+ 19"

== Stage 3 ==
8 May 2006 — Perwez (Belgium) to Namur (Belgium) 202 km (126 mi)

Although the profile for this stage was quite flat, pre-race analysis expected that the stage would not favor sprinters like the previous stage had. The course included a cobbled climb by the Meuse River, on roads visited in La Flèche Wallonne, and another in the last 2 km (1.2 mi) to the finish line by the Citadel of Namur.

It took two hours for a breakaway group to form on this stage. After a move instigated by Moisés Aldape, he and Amaël Moinard, Markel Irizar, Raffaele Illiano formed the day's escape. The peloton was content to let this group get away for a while, affording them three minutes advantage in the 10 km (6.2 mi) after Aldape first attacked. Quick-Step–Innergetic organized the chase, working for their captain, classics specialist Paolo Bettini, who was thought to be a favorite for the stage. Their lead started to dissipate as individual tactics began on the day's second climb. Aldape was first to the line and took sufficient points to gain the green jersey. About 50 km (31 mi) from the finish, Dario Cioni and Alessandro Petacchi crashed at the back of the peloton, going about 60 km/h (37 mph) at the time. Petacchi got up and, with the help of his teammates, made it to the finish some 14 minutes after the stage winner. Though he said he felt better after the stage than he did immediately after the crash, tests after the stage revealed that he had fractured his left kneecap and had to abandon the race.

Though the crash afforded the leading quartet a little more time, they were easily caught by 20 km (12 mi) to go. The rain, which had been falling lightly throughout the day, intensified in the stage's final kilometers. Between 20 km (12 mi) and 10 km (6.2 mi) to go, no team forced the pace, and Team CSC rode a tempo to try to keep their leader Ivan Basso safe. A Euskaltel–Euskadi rider crashed with just over 3 km (1.9 mi) to go, splitting what had been the pink jersey group into two. Alberto Loddo was the first to try to attack for the stage win. José Luis Rubiera countered with 1,700 m (5,600 ft) to go and appeared poised for the win until Stefan Schumacher passed him a few hundred meters later, winning the stage and the pink jersey.

Stage 3 result

	Rider	Team	Time
1	Stefan Schumacher (GER)	Gerolsteiner	5h 14' 41"
2	José Luis Rubiera (ESP)	Discovery Channel	+ 2"
3	Davide Rebellin (ITA)	Gerolsteiner	+ 6"
4	Paolo Bettini (ITA)	Quick-Step–Innergetic	+ 6"
5	Philippe Gilbert (BEL)	Française des Jeux	+ 6"
6	Jens Voigt (GER)	Team CSC	+ 6"
7	Andrea Moletta (ITA)	Gerolsteiner	+ 6"
8	José Iván Gutiérrez (ESP)	Caisse d'Epargne–Illes Balears	+ 6"
9	Paolo Savoldelli (ITA)	Discovery Channel	+ 6"
10	Franco Pellizotti (ITA)	Liquigas	+ 9"

General classification after stage 3

	Rider	Team	Time
1	Stefan Schumacher (GER)	Gerolsteiner	10h 14' 04"
2	Paolo Savoldelli (ITA)	Discovery Channel	+ 13"
3	Davide Rebellin (ITA)	Gerolsteiner	+ 23"
4	José Iván Gutiérrez (ESP)	Caisse d'Epargne–Illes Balears	+ 29"
5	José Luis Rubiera (ESP)	Discovery Channel	+ 31"
6	Serhiy Honchar (UKR)	T-Mobile Team	+ 31"
7	Bradley McGee (AUS)	Française des Jeux	+ 31"
8	Francisco Pérez (ESP)	Caisse d'Epargne–Illes Balears	+ 32"
9	José Enrique Gutiérrez (ESP)	Phonak	+ 33"
10	Michael Rogers (AUS)	T-Mobile Team	+ 37"

== Stage 4 ==
9 May 2006 — Wanze (Belgium) to Hotton (Belgium) 193 km (120 mi)

The last stage in Belgium was undulating, with several small rises in elevation. Included among them were two categorized climbs often included in the Ardennes classics.

The day's signature breakaway formed very quickly after the true beginning of the stage, which was expected given that the uphill stretches began almost immediately. Sandy Casar, Grischa Niermann, Patrick Calcagni, Jurgen Van de Walle, and Alessandro Bertolini slipped away and, thanks to a helpful tailwind, built up a 3'30" advantage by the 26 km (16 mi) mark. Their eventual maximum advantage was just less than seven minutes. Davitamon–Lotto and Gerolsteiner led the chase. By 15 km (9.3 mi) to go, the break's lead was reduced to 20 seconds, and Niermann tried to solo in the rest of the way. Eventually, the riders were all together again, though the escape had allowed Casar to be first over the day's climbs and win enough points to take the green jersey from Moisés Aldape. Team Milram led the peloton through the final kilometers – although they had lost their leader Alessandro Petacchi in the previous stage, they still had other strong sprinters on their squad, riders who would have normally been Petacchi's last leadout man. They set up the sprint with Mirco Lorenzetto in mind, but Davitamon–Lotto leader Robbie McEwen followed their wheels and timed his acceleration just right to take his second stage win of this Giro. Aside from three riders, the entire peloton finished the stage together, meaning the day's effect on the overall standings was virtually nil – the only change was Bettini's second-place time bonus moving him from 11th to 10th.

Stage 4 result

	Rider	Team	Time
1	Robbie McEwen (AUS)	Davitamon–Lotto	4h 38' 51"
2	Paolo Bettini (ITA)	Quick-Step–Innergetic	s.t.
3	Alberto Loddo (ITA)	Selle Italia–Diquigiovanni	s.t.
4	Maximiliano Richeze (ARG)	Ceramica Panaria–Navigare	s.t.
5	Olaf Pollack (GER)	T-Mobile Team	s.t.
6	Mirco Lorenzetto (ITA)	Team Milram	s.t.
7	Philippe Gilbert (BEL)	Française des Jeux	s.t.
8	Tomas Vaitkus (LTU)	AG2R Prévoyance	s.t.
9	Koldo Fernández (ESP)	Euskaltel–Euskadi	s.t.
10	Sébastien Chavanel (FRA)	Bouygues Télécom	s.t.

General classification after stage 4

	Rider	Team	Time
1	Stefan Schumacher (GER)	Gerolsteiner	14h 52' 55"
2	Paolo Savoldelli (ITA)	Discovery Channel	+ 13"
3	Davide Rebellin (ITA)	Gerolsteiner	+ 23"
4	José Iván Gutiérrez (ESP)	Caisse d'Epargne–Illes Balears	+ 29"
5	José Luis Rubiera (ESP)	Discovery Channel	+ 31"
6	Serhiy Honchar (UKR)	T-Mobile Team	+ 31"
7	Bradley McGee (AUS)	Française des Jeux	+ 31"
8	Francisco Pérez (ESP)	Caisse d'Epargne–Illes Balears	+ 32"
9	José Enrique Gutiérrez (ESP)	Phonak	+ 33"
10	Paolo Bettini (ITA)	Quick-Step–Innergetic	+ 35"

== Stage 5 ==
11 May 2006 — Piacenza to Cremona 35 km (22 mi) (team time trial)

After the rest day and transfer to Italy, the fifth stage was a team time trial (TTT). A favorite discipline of second-year race director Angelo Zomegnan, this was the first TTT in the Giro in 17 years. The course was flat and favored powerful squads like Team CSC and Discovery Channel.

The dominance of the Lance Armstrong-led Discovery Channel team in recent years in TTT's in the Tour de France had had that race institute a rule limiting time losses in the general classification for individual riders finishing together. The Giro did not institute this rule, however, and only real time was taken on the stage. There was a slight tailwind blowing on the day, and the course was reduced in length slightly from the planned length of 38 km (24 mi), which was expected to make for limited time gaps.

Davitamon–Lotto, led by points classification leader Robbie McEwen, set the early time to beat, coming home in 38'05" and bettering the times of Selle Italia–Diquigiovanni and Bouygues Télécom. The next team on the course was Saunier Duval–Prodir, who were composed of climbers and not time trialists and managed an 18th place ride with 39'22". Shortly thereafter came Liquigas and Team CSC, who posted successive best times at the first intermediate time check. Team CSC had the best time at the finish line, stopping the clock in 36'56", leading to speculation over whether Jens Voigt would take the race leadership. Though T-Mobile Team was eight seconds off Team CSC's pace at the first time check and gradually faded further, they rode a very strong final 10 km (6.2 mi) and put the next pink jersey on their star time trialist Serhiy Honchar. They finished only one second worse than Team CSC at the finish line.

Discovery Channel and Gerolsteiner were the last teams on the course. Discovery Channel's squad wasn't nearly as strong as it had been in the 2005 Tour de France when they were stage winners who handily defeated every team but Team CSC, though they still managed third on the day with 37'25". Gerolsteiner never stood much chance of retaining the jersey, though their sixth-place ride in 37'59" was better than pre-stage expectations.

Stage 5 result

	Team	Time
1	Team CSC	36' 56"
2	T-Mobile Team	+ 1"
3	Discovery Channel	+ 39"
4	Liquigas	+ 42"
5	Française des Jeux	+ 1' 00"
6	Gerolsteiner	+ 1' 03"
7	Quick-Step–Innergetic	+ 1' 03"
8	Lampre–Fondital	+ 1' 04"
9	Phonak	+ 1' 04"
10	Crédit Agricole	+ 1' 07"

General classification after stage 5

	Rider	Team	Time
1	Serhiy Honchar (UKR)	T-Mobile Team	15h 30' 23"
2	Jens Voigt (GER)	Team CSC	+ 6"
3	Michael Rogers (AUS)	T-Mobile Team	+ 6"
4	Olaf Pollack (GER)	T-Mobile Team	+ 10"
5	Ivan Basso (ITA)	Team CSC	+ 11"
6	Paolo Savoldelli (ITA)	Discovery Channel	+ 20"
7	Nicki Sørensen (DEN)	Team CSC	+ 29"
8	Stefan Schumacher (GER)	Gerolsteiner	+ 31"
9	Bobby Julich (USA)	Team CSC	+ 33"
10	José Luis Rubiera (ESP)	Discovery Channel	+ 38"

== Stage 6 ==
12 May 2006 — Busseto to Forlì 227 km (141 mi)

This stage was very flat, heading on straight roads southeast through the region of Emilia-Romagna. It was the first time the Giro had come to Forlì in 29 years, with a stage that stood to favor the sprinters.

Though the peloton first seemed to want to keep Sergiy Matveyev, Christophe Edaleine, and Andoni Aranaga from breaking away after just 6 km (3.7 mi), the trio fought through the counter-attacks and became the day's signature escape. Their biggest advantage of the day was 6'14", at the intermediate sprint in Rio Saliceto. Davitamon–Lotto led the chase, with double stage winner Robbie McEwen in mind. The course's perfectly flat terrain meant that it was exceedingly unlikely that the break would stay away to the finish. T-Mobile Team joined the chase, and by 25 km (16 mi) to go the time gap was just 40 seconds. The peloton thus stood the risk of catching them too soon, which would leave open the possibility for counter-attacks when the catch occurred. The trio's lead grew a little for the next several kilometers until they were at last brought back with 9 km (5.6 mi) left in the stage. Several teams tried to control the field in the run in to the finish, with their various sprinters in mind. AG2R Prévoyance's Tomas Vaitkus flew out of the main field with 300 m (980 ft) left, followed closely by McEwen and Olaf Pollack. Pollack later described that his primary leadout man André Korff had crashed about a kilometer earlier, which threw off his preparations for the sprint. Points classification leader McEwen was first over the line to claim his third stage win of the Giro, but the 12-second time bonus Pollack received made him the new race leader.

Stage 6 result

	Rider	Team	Time
1	Robbie McEwen (AUS)	Davitamon–Lotto	5h 24' 13"
2	Olaf Pollack (GER)	T-Mobile Team	s.t.
3	Tomas Vaitkus (LTU)	AG2R Prévoyance	s.t.
4	Leonardo Duque (COL)	Cofidis	s.t.
5	Koldo Fernández (ESP)	Euskaltel–Euskadi	s.t.
6	Fabrizio Guidi (ITA)	Phonak	s.t.
7	Paolo Bettini (ITA)	Quick-Step–Innergetic	s.t.
8	Elia Rigotto (ITA)	Team Milram	s.t.
9	Maximiliano Richeze (ARG)	Ceramica Panaria–Navigare	s.t.
10	Manuele Mori (ITA)	Saunier Duval–Prodir	s.t.

General classification after stage 6

	Rider	Team	Time
1	Olaf Pollack (GER)	T-Mobile Team	20h 54' 34"
2	Serhiy Honchar (UKR)	T-Mobile Team	+ 2"
3	Jens Voigt (GER)	Team CSC	+ 8"
4	Michael Rogers (AUS)	T-Mobile Team	+ 8"
5	Ivan Basso (ITA)	Team CSC	+ 13"
6	Paolo Savoldelli (ITA)	Discovery Channel	+ 22"
7	Nicki Sørensen (DEN)	Team CSC	+ 31"
8	Stefan Schumacher (GER)	Gerolsteiner	+ 33"
9	Bobby Julich (USA)	Team CSC	+ 35"
10	José Luis Rubiera (ESP)	Discovery Channel	+ 40"

== Stage 7 ==
13 May 2006 — Cesena to Saltara 236 km (147 mi)

Stage 7 result

	Rider	Team	Time
1	Rik Verbrugghe (BEL)	Cofidis	6h 42' 15"
2	Paolo Savoldelli (ITA)	Discovery Channel	+ 14"
3	Luca Mazzanti (ITA)	Ceramica Panaria–Navigare	+ 14"
4	José Enrique Gutiérrez (ESP)	Phonak	+ 14"
5	Davide Rebellin (ITA)	Gerolsteiner	+ 16"
6	Ivan Basso (ITA)	Team CSC	+ 16"
7	Serhiy Honchar (UKR)	T-Mobile Team	+ 16"
8	Gilberto Simoni (ITA)	Saunier Duval–Prodir	+ 16"
9	Laurent Lefèvre (FRA)	Bouygues Télécom	+ 20"
10	Michele Scarponi (ITA)	Liberty Seguros–Würth	+ 20"

General classification after stage 7

	Rider	Team	Time
1	Serhiy Honchar (UKR)	T-Mobile Team	27h 37' 07"
2	Paolo Savoldelli (ITA)	Discovery Channel	+ 6"
3	Ivan Basso (ITA)	Team CSC	+ 11"
4	Michael Rogers (AUS)	T-Mobile Team	+ 32"
5	Davide Rebellin (ITA)	Gerolsteiner	+ 54"
6	José Luis Rubiera (ESP)	Discovery Channel	+ 56"
7	Tom Danielson (USA)	Discovery Channel	+ 57"
8	José Enrique Gutiérrez (ESP)	Phonak	+ 1' 03"
9	Danilo Di Luca (ITA)	Liquigas	+ 1' 07"
10	Jens Voigt (GER)	Team CSC	+ 1' 09"

== Stage 8 ==
14 May 2006 — Civitanova Marche to Maielletta 171 km (106 mi)

Stage 8 result

	Rider	Team	Time
1	Ivan Basso (ITA)	Team CSC	4h 04' 19"
2	Damiano Cunego (ITA)	Lampre–Fondital	+ 30"
3	José Enrique Gutiérrez (ESP)	Phonak	+ 30"
4	Giampaolo Caruso (ITA)	Liberty Seguros–Würth	+ 45"
5	Luca Mazzanti (ITA)	Ceramica Panaria–Navigare	+ 1' 09"
6	Leonardo Piepoli (ITA)	Saunier Duval–Prodir	+ 1' 15"
7	Gilberto Simoni (ITA)	Saunier Duval–Prodir	+ 1' 15"
8	Danilo Di Luca (ITA)	Liquigas	+ 1' 32"
9	José Rujano (VEN)	Selle Italia–Diquigiovanni	+ 1' 50"
10	Julio Alberto Pérez (MEX)	Ceramica Panaria–Navigare	+ 1' 52"

General classification after stage 8

	Rider	Team	Time
1	Ivan Basso (ITA)	Team CSC	31h 41' 17"
2	José Enrique Gutiérrez (ESP)	Phonak	+ 1' 34"
3	Damiano Cunego (ITA)	Lampre–Fondital	+ 1' 48"
4	Paolo Savoldelli (ITA)	Discovery Channel	+ 2' 35"
5	Serhiy Honchar (UKR)	T-Mobile Team	+ 2' 43"
6	Danilo Di Luca (ITA)	Liquigas	+ 2' 48"
7	Gilberto Simoni (ITA)	Saunier Duval–Prodir	+ 3' 20"
8	Giampaolo Caruso (ITA)	Liberty Seguros–Würth	+ 3' 23"
9	Tom Danielson (USA)	Discovery Channel	+ 3' 31"
10	José Luis Rubiera (ESP)	Discovery Channel	+ 3' 39"

== Stage 9 ==
15 May 2006 — Francavilla al Mare to Termoli 171 km (106 mi)

Stage 9 result

	Rider	Team	Time
1	Tomas Vaitkus (LTU)	AG2R Prévoyance	3h 05' 13"
2	Paolo Bettini (ITA)	Quick-Step–Innergetic	s.t.
3	Olaf Pollack (GER)	T-Mobile Team	s.t.
4	Robbie McEwen (AUS)	Davitamon–Lotto	s.t.
5	Philippe Gilbert (BEL)	Française des Jeux	s.t.
6	Alexander Bocharov (RUS)	Crédit Agricole	s.t.
7	Manuele Mori (ITA)	Saunier Duval–Prodir	s.t.
8	Maximiliano Richeze (ARG)	Ceramica Panaria–Navigare	s.t.
9	Leonardo Duque (COL)	Cofidis	s.t.
10	Alessandro Spezialetti (ITA)	Liquigas	s.t.

General classification after stage 9

	Rider	Team	Time
1	Ivan Basso (ITA)	Team CSC	34h 46' 30"
2	José Enrique Gutiérrez (ESP)	Phonak	+ 1' 34"
3	Damiano Cunego (ITA)	Lampre–Fondital	+ 1' 48"
4	Paolo Savoldelli (ITA)	Discovery Channel	+ 2' 35"
5	Serhiy Honchar (UKR)	T-Mobile Team	+ 2' 43"
6	Danilo Di Luca (ITA)	Liquigas	+ 2' 48"
7	Gilberto Simoni (ITA)	Saunier Duval–Prodir	+ 3' 20"
8	Giampaolo Caruso (ITA)	Liberty Seguros–Würth	+ 3' 23"
9	Tom Danielson (USA)	Discovery Channel	+ 3' 31"
10	José Luis Rubiera (ESP)	Discovery Channel	+ 3' 39"

== Stage 10 ==
16 May 2006 — Termoli to Peschici 187 km (116 mi)

Stage 10 result

	Rider	Team	Time
1	Franco Pellizotti (ITA)	Liquigas	4h 39' 47"
2	Vladimir Efimkin (RUS)	Caisse d'Epargne–Illes Balears	s.t.
3	Serguei Yakovlev (KAZ)	Liberty Seguros–Würth	+ 2"
4	Hubert Dupont (FRA)	AG2R Prévoyance	+ 2"
5	Theo Eltink (NED)	Rabobank	+ 3"
6	José Luis Carrasco (ESP)	Caisse d'Epargne–Illes Balears	+ 3"
7	Marco Pinotti (ITA)	Saunier Duval–Prodir	+ 5"
8	Sven Krauß (GER)	Gerolsteiner	+ 5"
9	Alexandr Kolobnev (RUS)	Rabobank	+ 8"
10	Joan Horrach (ESP)	Caisse d'Epargne–Illes Balears	+ 8"

General classification after stage 10

	Rider	Team	Time
1	Ivan Basso (ITA)	Team CSC	39h 29' 40"
2	José Enrique Gutiérrez (ESP)	Phonak	+ 1' 34"
3	Damiano Cunego (ITA)	Lampre–Fondital	+ 1' 48"
4	Franco Pellizotti (ITA)	Liquigas	+ 2' 05"
5	Paolo Savoldelli (ITA)	Discovery Channel	+ 2' 35"
6	Serhiy Honchar (UKR)	T-Mobile Team	+ 2' 43"
7	Danilo Di Luca (ITA)	Liquigas	+ 2' 48"
8	Gilberto Simoni (ITA)	Saunier Duval–Prodir	+ 3' 20"
9	Giampaolo Caruso (ITA)	Liberty Seguros–Würth	+ 3' 23"
10	Tom Danielson (USA)	Discovery Channel	+ 3' 31"

== Stage 11 ==
18 May 2006 — Pontedera 50 km (31 mi) (individual time trial)

Stage 11 result

	Rider	Team	Time
1	Jan Ullrich (GER)	T-Mobile Team	58' 48"
2	Ivan Basso (ITA)	Team CSC	+ 28"
3	Marco Pinotti (ITA)	Saunier Duval–Prodir	+ 1' 01"
4	Serhiy Honchar (UKR)	T-Mobile Team	+ 1' 09"
5	Paolo Savoldelli (ITA)	Discovery Channel	+ 1' 19"
6	José Enrique Gutiérrez (ESP)	Phonak	+ 1' 42"
7	Jens Voigt (GER)	Team CSC	+ 2' 12"
8	Gustav Larsson (SWE)	Française des Jeux	+ 2' 22"
9	Dario Cioni (ITA)	Liquigas	+ 2' 24"
10	Viatcheslav Ekimov (RUS)	Discovery Channel	+ 2' 27"

General classification after stage 11

	Rider	Team	Time
1	Ivan Basso (ITA)	Team CSC	40h 28' 56"
2	José Enrique Gutiérrez (ESP)	Phonak	+ 2' 48"
3	Serhiy Honchar (UKR)	T-Mobile Team	+ 3' 24"
4	Paolo Savoldelli (ITA)	Discovery Channel	+ 3' 26"
5	Tom Danielson (USA)	Discovery Channel	+ 5' 38"
6	Franco Pellizotti (ITA)	Liquigas	+ 6' 37"
7	Víctor Hugo Peña (COL)	Phonak	+ 6' 54"
8	Damiano Cunego (ITA)	Lampre–Fondital	+ 6' 54"
9	Gilberto Simoni (ITA)	Saunier Duval–Prodir	+ 7' 13"
10	Danilo Di Luca (ITA)	Liquigas	+ 7' 33"
