= May 17 =

May 17 this year in various calendars
- Sunday, 17 May 2026
Other calendars
Armenian	1 Margach 1475
Aztec	Ochpaniztli 7, 11 Cuāuhtli
Babylonian	29 Nisanu, 2337 SE
Balinese pawukon	Luang, Pepet, Pasah, Jaya, Wage, Tungleh, Redite of Wariga, Guru, Nohan, Raksasa
Bengali	7 Bhadro, BS 1433
Chinese	Yin Metal Rabbit・Hairy Head Mansion -87 Qīyuè, Bǐngwǔnián (Lixia, 4 days until Xiaoman)
Common Era	17 May 2026 CE
Coptic	9 Pashons, AM 1742
Egyptian	1 Phaophi, 2775 NE
Ethiopian	9 Genbot, 2018 Amätä Məhrät
French Republican	Décade III, Octidi de Floréal de l'Année 234 de la République
Gregorian	17 May, AD 2026
Hebrew	1 Sivan, AM 5786; Omer 45
Icelandic	Sunnudagur, 25 Harpa 2026
Islamic	30 Dhu al-Qi'dah, AH 1447 (using tabular method)
ISO week date	2026-W20-7
Japanese	1 Uzuki, Reiwa 8 (Rikka, 4 days until Shōman)
Julian	4 May, AD 2026 (AM 7534)
Julian day	2461178
Maya	13.0.13.10.15; 8 Zip, 11 Men
Roman	ante diem IV Nonas Maias, MMDCCLXXIX AUC
Solar Hijri	27 Ordibehesht, SH 1405

<<	May					>>
Su	Mo	Tu	We	Th	Fr	Sa
					1	2
3	4	5	6	7	8	9
10	11	12	13	14	15	16
17	18	19	20	21	22	23
24	25	26	27	28	29	30
31
2026

May 17 in recent years
2026 (Sunday)
2025 (Saturday)
2024 (Friday)
2023 (Wednesday)
2022 (Tuesday)
2021 (Monday)
2020 (Sunday)
2019 (Friday)
2018 (Thursday)
2017 (Wednesday)

May 17 is the 137th day of the year (138th in leap years) in the Gregorian calendar; 228 days remain until the end of the year.

== Events ==
=== Pre-1600 ===
- 352 – Election of Pope Liberius following the death of Pope Julius I in the previous month.
- 884 – Election of Pope Hadrian III following the death of Pope Marinus I earlier that month.
- 1395 – Battle of Rovine: The Wallachians defeat an invading Ottoman army.
- 1521 – Edward Stafford, 3rd Duke of Buckingham, is executed for treason.
- 1527 – Pánfilo de Narváez departs Spain to explore Florida with 600 men – by 1536 only four survive.
- 1536 – George Boleyn, 2nd Viscount Rochford and four other men are executed for treason.
- 1536 – Henry VIII and Anne Boleyn's marriage is annulled.
- 1590 – Anne of Denmark is crowned Queen of Scotland.

=== 1601–1900 ===
- 1639 – The treaty of Zuhab ends the fifteen-year-long war between the Ottomans and the Safavids.
- 1642 – Paul de Chomedey, Sieur de Maisonneuve founds the Ville Marie de Montréal.
- 1648 – An allied French and Swedish army defeats Imperial and Bavarian forces in the Battle of Zusmarshausen.
- 1673 – Louis Jolliet and Jacques Marquette begin exploring the Mississippi River.
- 1756 – Seven Years' War formally begins when Great Britain declares war on France.
- 1760 – French forces besieging Quebec retreat after the Royal Navy arrives to relieve the British garrison.
- 1792 – The New York Stock Exchange is formed under the Buttonwood Agreement.
- 1805 – Muhammad Ali becomes Wāli of Egypt.
- 1809 – Emperor Napoleon I orders the annexation of the Papal States to the French Empire.
- 1814 – Occupation of Monaco changes from French to Austrian.
- 1814 – The Constitution of Norway is signed and Crown Prince Christian Frederick of Denmark is elected King of Norway by the Norwegian Constituent Assembly.
- 1859 – Members of the Melbourne Football Club codify the first rules of Australian rules football.
- 1863 – Rosalía de Castro publishes Cantares Gallegos, the first book in the Galician language.
- 1863 – American Civil War: During the Vicksburg campaign, Union forces under John A. McClernand defeat a Confederate rearguard and capture around 1,700 men at the Battle of Big Black River Bridge.
- 1865 – The International Telegraph Union (later the International Telecommunication Union) is established in Paris.
- 1875 – Aristides wins the first Kentucky Derby with the jockey Oliver Lewis (2:37.75).
- 1900 – The children's novel The Wonderful Wizard of Oz, by L. Frank Baum, is first published in the United States. The first copy is given to the author's sister.

=== 1901–present ===
- 1902 – Greek archaeologist Valerios Stais discovers the Antikythera mechanism, an ancient mechanical analog computer.
- 1914 – The Protocol of Corfu is signed, recognising full autonomy to Northern Epirus under nominal Albanian sovereignty.
- 1915 – The last British Liberal Party government (led by H. H. Asquith) falls.
- 1933 – Vidkun Quisling and Johan Bernhard Hjort form Nasjonal Samling — the national-socialist party of Norway.
- 1937 – Spanish Civil War: The Largo Caballero government resigns in the wake of the Barcelona May Days, leading Juan Negrín to form a government, without the anarcho-syndicalist CNT, in its stead.
- 1939 – The Columbia Lions and the Princeton Tigers play in the United States' first televised sporting event, a collegiate baseball game in New York City.
- 1940 – World War II: Germany occupies Brussels, Belgium.
- 1943 – World War II: Dambuster Raids commence by No. 617 Squadron RAF.
- 1953 – Delta Air Lines Flight 318 crashes near Marshall, Texas, killing 19.
- 1954 – The United States Supreme Court hands down a unanimous decision in Brown v. Board of Education of Topeka, Kansas, outlawing racial segregation in public schools.
- 1959 – In Cuba, the First Agrarian Reform Law – a cornerstone of the Cuban Revolution – is signed by Fidel Castro, aiming to eliminate large foreign-owned estates and redistribute land to over 100,000 peasants.
- 1967 – Six-Day War: President Gamal Abdel Nasser of Egypt demands dismantling of the peace-keeping UN Emergency Force in Egypt.
- 1969 – Venera program: Soviet Venera 6 begins its descent into the atmosphere of Venus, sending back atmospheric data before being crushed by pressure.
- 1973 – Watergate scandal: Televised hearings begin in the United States Senate.
- 1974 – The Troubles: Thirty-three civilians are killed and 300 injured when the Ulster Volunteer Force (UVF) detonates four car bombs in Dublin and Monaghan, Ireland.
- 1974 – Police in Los Angeles raid the Symbionese Liberation Army's headquarters, killing six members, including Camilla Hall.
- 1977 – Nolan Bushnell opens the first Chuck E. Cheese's Pizza Time Theatre (later renamed Chuck E. Cheese) in San Jose, California.
- 1980 – General Chun Doo-hwan of South Korea seizes control of the government and declares martial law in order to suppress student demonstrations.
- 1980 – On the eve of presidential elections, Maoist guerrilla group Shining Path attacks a polling location in Chuschi (a town in Ayacucho), starting the Internal conflict in Peru.
- 1980 – Rioting breaks out in downtown Miami, following the acquittal of four white police officers in the killing of Arthur McDuffie, a black insurance salesman.
- 1983 – The U.S. Department of Energy declassifies documents showing world's largest mercury pollution event in Oak Ridge, Tennessee (ultimately found to be 4.2 million pounds [1.9 kt]), in response to the Appalachian Observer's Freedom of Information Act request.
- 1983 – Lebanon, Israel, and the United States sign an agreement on Israeli withdrawal from Lebanon.
- 1984 – Prince Charles calls a proposed addition to the National Gallery, London, a "monstrous carbuncle on the face of a much-loved and elegant friend", sparking controversies on the proper role of the Royal Family and the course of modern architecture.
- 1987 – Iran–Iraq War: An Iraqi Dassault Mirage F1 fighter jet fires two missiles into the U.S. Navy warship USS Stark, killing 37 and injuring 21 of her crew.
- 1990 – The General Assembly of the World Health Organization (WHO) eliminates homosexuality from the list of psychiatric diseases.
- 1992 – Three days of popular protests against the government of Prime Minister of Thailand Suchinda Kraprayoon begin in Bangkok, leading to a military crackdown that results in 52 officially confirmed deaths, hundreds of injuries, many disappearances, and more than 3,500 arrests.
- 1994 – Malawi holds its first multi-party elections.
- 1995 – Shawn Nelson steals an M60 tank from the California Army National Guard Armory in San Diego and proceeds to go on a rampage.
- 1997 – Troops of Laurent-Désiré Kabila march into Kinshasa. Zaire is officially renamed Democratic Republic of the Congo.
- 2000 – Arsenal and Galatasaray fans clash in the 2000 UEFA Cup Final riots in Copenhagen.
- 2004 – The first legal same-sex marriages in the U.S. are performed in the state of Massachusetts.
- 2006 – The aircraft carrier USS Oriskany is sunk in the Gulf of Mexico as an artificial reef.
- 2007 – Trains from North and South Korea cross the 38th Parallel in a test-run agreed by both governments. This is the first time that trains have crossed the Demilitarized Zone since 1953.
- 2010 – Pamir Airways Flight 112 crashes in Afghanistan's Shakardara District, killing 44.
- 2014 – A military plane crash in northern Laos kills 17 people.

== Births ==
=== Pre-1600 ===
- 1155 – Jien, Japanese monk, poet, and historian (died 1225)
- 1443 – Edmund, Earl of Rutland (died 1460)
- 1451 – Engelbert II of Nassau, Count of Nassau-Vianden and Lord of Breda (1475–1504) (died 1504)
- 1490 – Albert, Duke of Prussia, last Grand Master of the Teutonic Knights (died 1568)
- 1500 – Federico II Gonzaga, Duke of Mantua (died 1540)
- 1551 – Martin Delrio, Belgian occultist and theologian (died 1601)
- 1568 – Anna Vasa of Sweden, Swedish princess (died 1625)

=== 1601–1900 ===
- 1610 – Stefano della Bella, Italian engraver and etcher (died 1664)
- 1628 – Ferdinand Charles, Archduke of Austria (died 1662)
- 1636 – Edward Colman, English Catholic courtier under Charles II (died 1678)
- 1682 – Bartholomew Roberts, Welsh pirate (died 1722)
- 1698 – Gio Nicola Buhagiar, Maltese painter (died 1752)
- 1706 – Andreas Felix von Oefele, German historian and librarian (died 1780)
- 1718 – Robert Darcy, 4th Earl of Holderness, English politician and diplomat, Secretary of State for the Southern Department (died 1778)
- 1732 – Francesco Pasquale Ricci, Italian violinist and composer (died 1817)
- 1743 – Seth Warner, American colonel (died 1784)
- 1749 – Edward Jenner, English physician and microbiologist (died 1823)
- 1758 – Sir John St Aubyn, 5th Baronet, English politician (died 1839)
- 1768 – Caroline of Brunswick, Queen Consort of the United Kingdom and Hanover (died 1821)
- 1768 – Henry Paget, 1st Marquess of Anglesey, English general and politician, Lord Lieutenant of Ireland (died 1854)
- 1794 – Anna Brownell Jameson, Irish-English author (died 1860)
- 1818 – Ezra Otis Kendall, American professor, astronomer and mathematician (died 1899)
- 1821 – Sebastian Kneipp, German priest and therapist (died 1897)
- 1835 – Thomas McIlwraith, Scottish-Australian politician, 8th Premier of Queensland (died 1900)
- 1836 – Virginie Loveling, Belgian author and poet (died 1923)
- 1845 – Jacint Verdaguer, Catalan priest and poet (died 1902)
- 1860 – Martin Kukučín, Slovak author and playwright (died 1928)
- 1860 – Charlotte Barnum, American mathematician and social activist (died 1934)
- 1863 – Léon Gérin, Canadian lawyer, sociologist, and civil servant (died 1951)
- 1864 – Louis Richardet, Swiss target shooter (died 1923)
- 1864 – Ante Trumbić, Croatian lawyer and politician, 27th Mayor of Split (died 1938)
- 1866 – Erik Satie, French pianist and composer (died 1925)
- 1868 – Horace Elgin Dodge, American businessman, co-founded Dodge (died 1920)
- 1868 – Panagis Tsaldaris, Greek politician, Prime Minister of Greece (died 1936)
- 1870 – Newton Moore, Australian politician, 8th Premier of Western Australia (died 1936)
- 1873 – Henri Barbusse, French author and journalist (died 1935)
- 1873 – Dorothy Richardson, English author and journalist (died 1957)
- 1874 – George Sheldon, American diver (died 1907)
- 1882 – Karl Burman, Estonian architect and painter (died 1965)
- 1886 – Alfonso XIII, Spanish monarch (died 1941)
- 1888 – Tich Freeman, English cricketer (died 1965)
- 1889 – Dorothy Gibson, American actress and singer (died 1946)
- 1889 – Alfonso Reyes, Mexican author (died 1959)
- 1891 – Napoleon Zervas, Greek general and politician (died 1957)
- 1893 – Frederick McKinley Jones, American inventor and entrepreneur (died 1961)
- 1895 – Saul Adler, Belarusian-English captain and parasitologist (died 1966)
- 1895 – Reinhold Saulmann, Estonian sprinter and bandy player (died 1936)
- 1897 – Odd Hassel, Norwegian chemist and academic, Nobel Prize laureate (died 1981)
- 1898 – A. J. Casson, Canadian painter (died 1992)
- 1899 – Carmen de Icaza, Spanish writer (died 1979)

=== 1901–present ===
- 1901 – Werner Egk, German pianist and composer (died 1983)
- 1903 – Cool Papa Bell, American baseball player and manager (died 1991)
- 1904 – Marie-Anne Desmarest, French author (died 1973)
- 1906 – Zinka Milanov, Croatian-American soprano and educator (died 1989)
- 1909 – Julius Sumner Miller, American physicist and academic (died 1987)
- 1911 – Lisa Fonssagrives, Swedish-American model (died 1992)
- 1911 – Maureen O'Sullivan, Irish-American actress (died 1998)
- 1912 – Archibald Cox, American lawyer and politician, 31st United States Solicitor General (died 2004)
- 1912 – Mary Beatrice Davidson Kenner, American inventor (died 2006)
- 1913 – Hans Ruesch, Swiss racing driver and author (died 2007)
- 1914 – Robert N. Thompson, American-Canadian chiropractor and politician (died 1997)
- 1918 – Joan Benham, English actress (died 1981)
- 1918 – Birgit Nilsson, Swedish operatic soprano (died 2005)
- 1919 – Antonio Aguilar, Mexican singer-songwriter, producer, actor, and screenwriter (died 2007)
- 1919 – Gustav Naan, Russian-Estonian physicist and philosopher (died 1994)
- 1920 – Harry Männil, Estonian-Venezuelan businessman, co-founded ACO Group (died 2010)
- 1921 – Dennis Brain, English horn player (died 1957)
- 1921 – Bob Merrill, American composer and screenwriter (died 1998)
- 1922 – Jean Rédélé, French racing driver, founded Alpine (died 2007)
- 1923 – Michael Beetham, English commander and pilot (died 2015)
- 1924 – Roy Bentley, English footballer (died 2018)
- 1924 – Francis Tombs, Baron Tombs, English engineer and politician (died 2020)
- 1926 – David Ogilvy, 13th Earl of Airlie, English-Scottish soldier and politician (died 2023)
- 1926 – Dietmar Schönherr, Austrian-Spanish actor, director, and screenwriter (died 2014)
- 1926 – Franz Sondheimer, German-English chemist and academic (died 1981)
- 1929 – Branko Zebec, Croatian and Yugoslav football player and coach (died 1988)
- 1931 – Marshall Applewhite, American cult leader, founded Heaven's Gate (died 1997)
- 1931 – Dewey Redman, American saxophonist (died 2006)
- 1932 – Rodric Braithwaite, English soldier and diplomat, British Ambassador to Russia
- 1932 – Peter Burge, Australian cricketer (died 2001)
- 1932 – Ozzie Virgil Sr., Dominican baseball player and coach (died 2024)
- 1933 – Yelena Gorchakova, Russian javelin thrower (died 2002)
- 1934 – Friedrich-Wilhelm Kiel, German educator and politician (died 2022)
- 1934 – Earl Morrall, American football player and coach (died 2014)
- 1934 – Ronald Wayne, American computer scientist, co-founded Apple Computer
- 1935 – Dennis Potter, English voice actor, director, producer, and screenwriter (died 1994)
- 1936 – Dennis Hopper, American actor and director (died 2010)
- 1937 – Hazel R. O'Leary, American lawyer and politician, 7th United States Secretary of Energy
- 1938 – Jason Bernard, American actor (died 1996)
- 1938 – Marcia Freedman, Israeli activist (died 2021)
- 1938 – Pervis Jackson, American R&B bass singer (died 2008)
- 1939 – Hugh Dykes, Baron Dykes, English politician
- 1939 – Gary Paulsen, American author (died 2021)
- 1940 – Alan Kay, American computer scientist and academic
- 1940 – Reynato Puno, Filipino lawyer and jurist, 22nd Chief Justice of the Supreme Court of the Philippines
- 1941 – David Cope, American composer and author (died 2025)
- 1941 – Ben Nelson, American lawyer and politician, 37th Governor of Nebraska
- 1942 – Taj Mahal, American blues singer-songwriter and musician
- 1943 – Sirajuddin of Perlis, Yang di-Pertuan Agong of Malaysia
- 1943 – Johnny Warren, Australian footballer, coach, and sportscaster (died 2004)
- 1944 – Jesse Winchester, American singer-songwriter, guitarist, and producer (died 2014)
- 1945 – B.S. Chandrasekhar, Indian cricketer
- 1945 – Tony Roche, Australian tennis player and coach
- 1946 – Udo Lindenberg, German singer-songwriter and drummer
- 1947 – Stephen Platten, English bishop
- 1948 – Dick Gaughan, Scottish singer-songwriter and guitarist
- 1949 – Bill Bruford, English drummer, songwriter, and producer
- 1949 – Keith, American pop singer
- 1950 – Howard Ashman, American playwright and composer (died 1991)
- 1950 – Keith Bradley, Baron Bradley, English accountant and politician
- 1950 – Janez Drnovšek, Slovenian economist and politician, 2nd President of Slovenia (died 2008)
- 1950 – Alan Johnson, English politician, Shadow Chancellor of the Exchequer
- 1950 – Valeriya Novodvorskaya, Russian journalist and politician (died 2014)
- 1951 – Simon Hughes, English lawyer and politician
- 1952 – Howard Hampton, Canadian lawyer and politician
- 1954 – Michael Roberts, South African-English jockey
- 1955 – Bill Paxton, American actor and director (died 2017)
- 1955 – David Townsend, American singer-songwriter and guitarist (died 2005)
- 1956 – Sugar Ray Leonard, American boxer
- 1956 – Annise Parker, American politician
- 1956 – Bob Saget, American comedian, actor, and television host (died 2022)
- 1956 – Dave Sim, Canadian cartoonist and author
- 1957 – Pascual Pérez, Dominican baseball player (died 2012)
- 1958 – Paul Di'Anno, English rock singer-songwriter (died 2024)
- 1959 – Marcelo Loffreda, Argentine rugby player and coach
- 1960 – Lou DiBella, American boxing promoter, actor, and producer
- 1960 – Simon Fuller, English talent manager and producer, created the Idols series
- 1961 – Enya, Irish singer-songwriter and producer
- 1961 – Jamil Azzaoui, Canadian singer-songwriter and guitarist
- 1961 – Justin King, English businessman
- 1962 – Lise Lyng Falkenberg, Danish journalist and author
- 1962 – Andrew Farrar, Australian rugby league player and coach
- 1962 – Craig Ferguson, Scottish-American comedian, actor, and talk show host
- 1962 – Jane Moore, English journalist and author
- 1962 – Rosalind Picard, American computer scientist and engineer, co-founded Affectiva
- 1963 – Jon Koncak, American basketball player
- 1963 – Page McConnell, American keyboard player and songwriter
- 1964 – Stratos Apostolakis, Greek footballer and coach
- 1964 – Mauro Martini, Italian race car driver
- 1964 – Menno Oosting, Dutch tennis player (died 1999)
- 1965 – Trent Reznor, American singer-songwriter, multi-instrumentalist, and producer
- 1965 – Jeremy Vine, English journalist and author
- 1965 – Luann de Lesseps, American singer and television personality
- 1966 – Qusay Hussein, Iraqi soldier and politician (died 2003)
- 1966 – Mark Kratzmann, Australian tennis player and coach
- 1966 – Danny Manning, American basketball player and coach
- 1966 – Gilles Quénéhervé, French sprinter
- 1967 – Mohamed Nasheed, Maldivian lawyer and politician 4th President of the Maldives
- 1967 – Patrick Ortlieb, Austrian skier
- 1968 – Dave Abbruzzese, American rock drummer and songwriter
- 1969 – Keith Hill, English footballer and manager
- 1970 – Hubert Davis, American basketball player and coach
- 1970 – Jordan Knight, American singer-songwriter and actor
- 1970 – Matt Lindland, American mixed martial artist, wrestler, and politician
- 1970 – Jodie Rogers, Australian diver
- 1970 – René Vilbre, Estonian director and screenwriter
- 1971 – Mark Connors, Australian rugby player
- 1971 – Shaun Hart, Australian footballer, coach, and sportscaster
- 1971 – Stella Jongmans, Dutch athlete
- 1971 – Queen Máxima of the Netherlands, Dutch royal
- 1971 – Gina Raimondo, Governor of Rhode Island
- 1972 – Barry Hayles, English born Jamaican international footballer
- 1973 – Josh Homme, American singer-songwriter, guitarist, and producer
- 1974 – Andrea Corr, Irish singer-songwriter, pianist, and actress
- 1974 – Wiki González, Venezuelan baseball player
- 1974 – Eddie Lewis, American international soccer player
- 1975 – Marcelinho Paraíba, Brazilian footballer
- 1975 – Alex Wright, German wrestler
- 1976 – Kandi Burruss, American singer-songwriter, producer, and actress
- 1976 – Shayne Dunley, Australian rugby league player
- 1976 – José Guillén, Dominican-American baseball player
- 1976 – Daniel Komen, Kenyan runner
- 1976 – Wang Leehom, American-Taiwanese singer-songwriter, producer, actor, and director
- 1976 – Mayte Martínez, Spanish runner
- 1976 – Kirsten Vlieghuis, Dutch freestyle swimmer
- 1978 – John Foster, American baseball player and coach
- 1978 – Paddy Kenny, English footballer
- 1978 – Carlos Peña, Dominican-American baseball player
- 1978 – Magdalena Zděnovcová, Czech tennis player
- 1979 – David Jarolím, Czech footballer
- 1979 – Wayne Thomas, English footballer
- 1980 – Davor Džalto, Bosnian historian and philosopher
- 1980 – Fredrik Kessiakoff, Swedish cyclist
- 1980 – Alistair Overeem, Dutch mixed martial artist and kickboxer
- 1980 – Ariën van Weesenbeek, Dutch drummer
- 1981 – Beñat Albizuri, Spanish cyclist
- 1981 – Leon Osman, English footballer
- 1981 – Lim Jeong-hee, South Korean singer
- 1981 – Chris Skidmore, English historian and politician
- 1981 – Giannis Taralidis, Greek footballer
- 1982 – Matt Cassel, American football player
- 1982 – Dan Hardy, English mixed martial artist
- 1982 – Reiko Nakamura, Japanese swimmer
- 1982 – Tony Parker, French-American basketball player
- 1982 – Chloe Smith, English politician
- 1983 – Ifeanyi Chiejine, Nigerian footballer (died 2019)
- 1983 – Channing Frye, American basketball player
- 1983 – Chris Henry, American football player (died 2009)
- 1983 – Nicky Hofs, Dutch footballer
- 1983 – Kevin Kingston, Australian rugby league player
- 1983 – Danniel Librelon, Brazilian politician
- 1983 – Jeremy Sowers, American baseball player
- 1984 – Christian Bolaños, Costa Rican footballer
- 1984 – Christine Ohuruogu, English runner
- 1984 – Christine Robinson, Canadian water polo player
- 1984 – Passenger, English singer-songwriter and musician
- 1985 – Teófilo Gutiérrez, Colombian footballer
- 1985 – Derek Hough, American actor, singer, and dancer
- 1985 – Christine Nesbitt, Canadian speed skater
- 1985 – Todd Redmond, American baseball player
- 1985 – Matt Ryan, American football player
- 1986 – Marius Činikas, Lithuanian footballer
- 1986 – Timo Simonlatser, Estonian skier
- 1986 – Jodie Taylor, English footballer
- 1987 – Edvald Boasson Hagen, Norwegian cyclist
- 1987 – Aleandro Rosi, Italian footballer
- 1988 – Nikki Reed, American actress, singer, and screenwriter
- 1989 – Mose Masoe, New Zealand rugby league player
- 1989 – Rain Raadik, Estonian basketball player
- 1989 – Tessa Virtue, Canadian ice dancer
- 1990 – Will Clyburn, American basketball player
- 1990 – Fabian Giefer, German footballer
- 1990 – Charlie Gubb, New Zealand rugby league player
- 1990 – Katrina Hart, English runner
- 1990 – Guido Pella, Argentine tennis player
- 1991 – Johanna Konta, Australian-English tennis player
- 1991 – Adil Omar, Pakistani rapper and music producer
- 1991 – Abigail Raye, Canadian field hockey player
- 1994 – Julie Anne San Jose, Filipina singer-songwriter

== Deaths ==
=== Pre-1600 ===
- 528 – Empress Dowager Hu of Northern Wei
- 528 – Yuan Yong, imperial prince of Northern Wei
- 528 – Yuan Zhao, emperor of Northern Wei (born 526)
- 896 – Liu Jianfeng, Chinese warlord
- 924 – Li Maozhen, Chinese warlord and king (born 856)
- 946 – Al-Qa'im bi-Amr Allah, Fatimid caliph (born 893)
- 1296 – Agnes of Bohemia, Duchess of Austria (born 1269)
- 1299 – Daumantas of Pskov, Lithuanian prince (born c. 1240)
- 1336 – Go-Fushimi, emperor of Japan (born 1288)
- 1365 – Louis II, Elector of Brandenburg (born 1328)
- 1395 – Konstantin Dejanović/Constantine Dragaš, Serbian ruler (born 1355)
- 1464 – Thomas de Ros, 9th Baron de Ros, English politician (born 1427)
- 1510 – Sandro Botticelli, Italian painter (born 1445)
- 1521 – Edward Stafford, 3rd Duke of Buckingham, Welsh politician, Lord High Constable of England (born 1478)
- 1536 – George Boleyn, 2nd Viscount Rochford, English courtier and diplomat, Lord Warden of the Cinque Ports (born 1504)
- 1536 – William Brereton, English courtier (born 1487)
- 1536 – Henry Norris, English courtier (born 1482)
- 1546 – Philipp von Hutten, German explorer (born 1511)
- 1551 – Shin Saimdang, South Korean poet and calligraphist (born 1504)
- 1558 – Francisco de Sá de Miranda, Portuguese poet (born 1485)
- 1575 – Matthew Parker, English archbishop and academic (born 1504)

=== 1601–1900 ===
- 1606 – False Dmitriy I, pretender to the Russian throne (born 1582)
- 1607 – Anna d'Este, French princess (born 1531)
- 1626 – Joan Pau Pujol, Catalan organist and composer (born 1570)
- 1643 – Giovanni Picchi, Italian organist and composer (born 1571)
- 1727 – Catherine I of Russia (born 1684)
- 1729 – Samuel Clarke, English clergyman and philosopher (born 1675)
- 1765 – Alexis Clairaut, French mathematician, astronomer, and geophysicist (born 1713)
- 1797 – Michel-Jean Sedaine, French playwright and composer (born 1719)
- 1801 – William Heberden, English physician and scholar (born 1710)
- 1807 – John Gunby, American general (born 1745)
- 1809 – Leopold Auenbrugger, Austrian physician (born 1722)
- 1822 – Armand-Emmanuel de Vignerot du Plessis, Duc de Richelieu, French general and politician, 2nd Prime Minister of France (born 1766)
- 1829 – John Jay, American politician and diplomat, 1st Chief Justice of the United States (born 1745)
- 1838 – René Caillié, French explorer and author (born 1799)
- 1838 – Charles Maurice de Talleyrand-Périgord, French politician, Prime Minister of France (born 1754)
- 1839 – Archibald Alison, Scottish priest and author (born 1757)
- 1868 – Kondō Isami, Japanese commander (born 1834)
- 1875 – John C. Breckinridge, American lawyer and politician, 14th Vice President of the United States, Confederate States general (born 1821)
- 1879 – Asa Packer, American businessman, founded Lehigh University (born 1805)
- 1880 – Ziya Pasha, Greek author and translator (born 1826)
- 1886 – John Deere, American blacksmith and businessman, founded the Deere & Company (born 1804)
- 1888 – Giacomo Zanella, Italian priest and poet (born 1820)

=== 1901–present ===
- 1911 – Frederick August Otto Schwarz, German-American businessman, founded FAO Schwarz (born 1836)
- 1916 – Boris Borisovich Golitsyn, Russian physicist and seismologist (born 1862)
- 1917 – Clara Ayres, American nurse (born 1880)
- 1917 – Charles Brooke, Rajah of Sarawak (born 1829)
- 1919 – Guido von List, Austrian-German journalist, author, and poet (born 1848)
- 1921 – Karl Mantzius, Danish actor and director (born 1860)
- 1922 – Dorothy Levitt, English racing driver and journalist (born 1882)
- 1927 – Harold Geiger, American pilot and lieutenant (born 1884)
- 1934 – Cass Gilbert, American architect (born 1859)
- 1935 – Paul Dukas, French composer, critic, and educator (born 1865)
- 1936 – Panagis Tsaldaris, Greek lawyer and politician, 124th Prime Minister of Greece (born 1868)
- 1938 – Jakob Ehrlich, Czech-Austrian academic and politician (born 1877)
- 1943 – Johanna Elberskirchen, German author and activist (born 1864)
- 1947 – George Forbes, New Zealand farmer and politician, 22nd Prime Minister of New Zealand (born 1869)
- 1951 – William Birdwood, Anglo-Indian field marshal (born 1865)
- 1960 – Jules Supervielle, Uruguayan-French poet and author (born 1884)
- 1963 – John Wilce, American football player, coach, and physician (born 1888)
- 1964 – Nandor Fodor, Hungarian-American psychologist and parapsychologist (born 1895)
- 1974 – Ernest Nash, German-American photographer and scholar (born 1898)
- 1977 – Charles E. Rosendahl, American admiral and pilot (born 1892)
- 1980 – Gündüz Kılıç, Turkish football player and coach (born 1918)
- 1985 – Abe Burrows, American director, composer, and author (born 1910)
- 1987 – Gunnar Myrdal, Swedish economist, sociologist, and politician, Nobel Prize laureate (born 1898)
- 1992 – Lawrence Welk, American accordion player and bandleader (born 1903)
- 1995 – Toe Blake, Canadian ice hockey player and coach (born 1912)
- 1996 – Kevin Gilbert, American singer-songwriter and producer (born 1966)
- 1999 – Bruce Fairbairn, Canadian trumpet player and producer (born 1949)
- 1999 – Lembit Oll, Estonian chess Grandmaster (born 1966)
- 2000 – Donald Coggan, English archbishop (born 1909)
- 2001 – Jacques-Louis Lions, French mathematician (born 1928)
- 2001 – Frank G. Slaughter, American physician and author (born 1908)
- 2002 – László Kubala, Hungarian-Spanish footballer, coach, and manager (born 1927)
- 2002 – Aşık Mahzuni Şerif, Turkish poet and composer (born 1940)
- 2004 – Jørgen Nash, Danish poet and painter (born 1920)
- 2004 – Tony Randall, American actor (born 1920)
- 2004 – Ezzedine Salim, Iraqi politician (born 1943)
- 2005 – Frank Gorshin, American actor (born 1934)
- 2006 – Cy Feuer, American director, producer, and composer (born 1911)
- 2007 – Lloyd Alexander, American soldier and author (born 1924)
- 2007 – T. K. Doraiswamy, Indian poet and author (born 1921)
- 2009 – Mario Benedetti, Uruguayan journalist, author, and poet (born 1920)
- 2009 – Jung Seung-hye, South Korean journalist and producer (born 1965)
- 2010 – Yvonne Loriod, French pianist, composer, and educator (born 1924)
- 2010 – Walasse Ting, Chinese-American painter and poet (born 1929)
- 2011 – Harmon Killebrew, American baseball player and sportscaster (born 1936)
- 2012 – Gideon Ezra, Israeli geographer and politician, Israeli Minister in the Prime Minister's Office (born 1937)
- 2012 – Patrick Mafisango, Congolese-Rwandan footballer (born 1980)
- 2012 – Donna Summer, American singer-songwriter (born 1948)
- 2013 – Philippe Gaumont, French cyclist (born 1973)
- 2013 – Peter Schulz, German politician, Mayor of Hamburg (born 1930)
- 2013 – Ken Venturi, American golfer and sportscaster (born 1931)
- 2013 – Jorge Rafael Videla, Argentine Commander in Chief and dictator (born 1925)
- 2014 – Gerald Edelman, American biologist and immunologist, Nobel Prize laureate (born 1929)
- 2014 – C. P. Krishnan Nair, Indian businessman, founded The Leela Palaces, Hotels and Resorts (born 1922)
- 2014 – Douangchay Phichit, Laotian politician (born 1944)
- 2014 – Thongbanh Sengaphone, Laotian politician (born 1953)
- 2015 – Lionel Pickens, American rapper (born 1983)
- 2017 – Todor Veselinović, Serbian football player and manager (born 1930)
- 2019 – Herman Wouk, American author (born 1915)
- 2020 – Lucky Peterson, American blues singer, keyboardist and guitarist (born 1964)
- 2022 – Vangelis, Greek musician, composer (born 1943)
- 2024 – Bud Anderson, American World War II flying ace (born 1922)
- 2024 – Sid Going, New Zealand rugby union footballer (born 1943)
- 2026 – M. J. K. Smith, English cricketer and rugby union player (born 1933)

== Holidays and observances ==
- Birthday of the Raja (Perlis)
- Christian feast day:
  - Giulia Salzano
  - Blessed Ivan Ziatyk
  - Paschal Baylon
  - Peter Lieou
  - William Hobart Hare (Episcopal Church (USA))
  - Restituta
  - May 17 (Eastern Orthodox liturgics)
- Children's Day (Norway)
- Constitution Day (Nauru)
- Constitution Day (Norway)
- Feast of ‘Aẓamat (Baháʼí Faith, day shifts with March Equinox, see List of observances set by the Baháʼí calendar)
- Galician Literature Day or Día das Letras Galegas (Galicia)
- International Day Against Homophobia, Biphobia and Transphobia
- Liberation Day (Democratic Republic of the Congo)
- Navy Day (Argentina)
- World Hypertension Day
- World Telecommunication and Information Society Day (International)
