= List of teams and cyclists in the 2007 Tour de France =

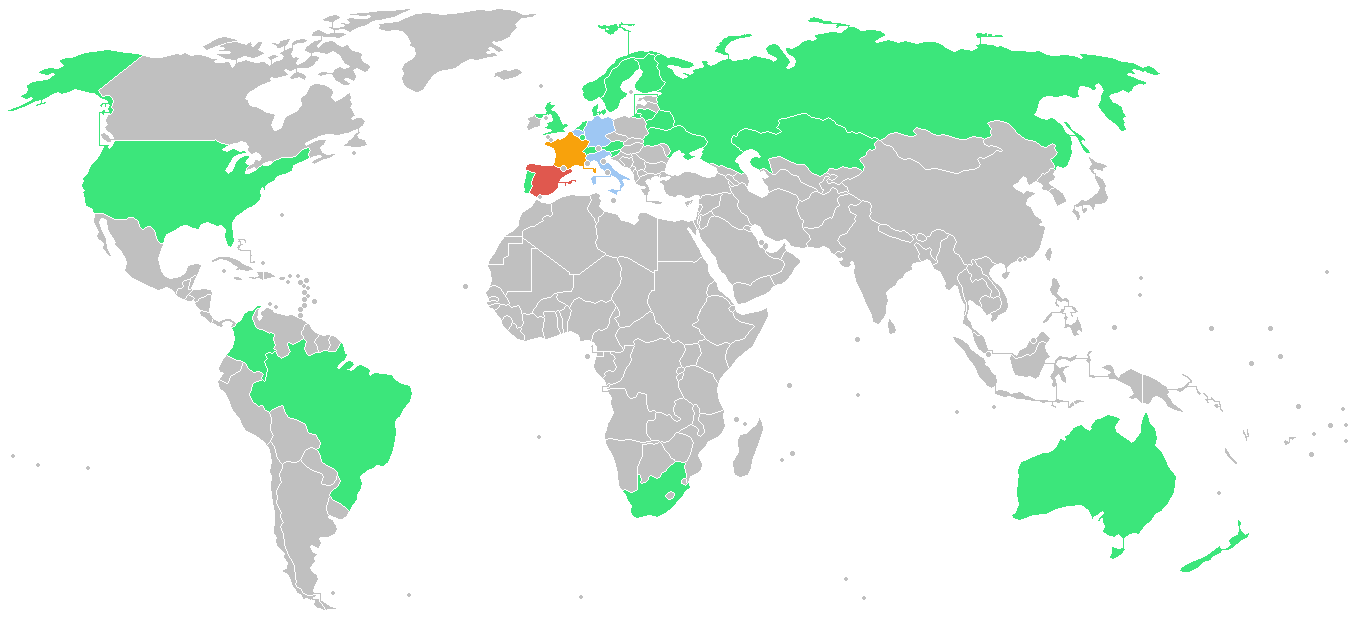
Participating riders from various nations, Green: fewer than 10 riders; blue: 10+; orange: 20+; red: 40+.

The list of teams and cyclists in the 2007 Tour de France contains the professional road bicycle racers who competed at the 2007 Tour de France from July 7 to July 29, 2007. Of the 20 UCI ProTour teams, Unibet.Com was not allowed to participate because their gambling sponsor conflicts with the law in France. Of the non-ProTour teams, the organisation invited Agritubel and Barloworld.

== Selection information ==
In the weeks before the start, many rumours and speculations were heard about which riders would or would not be selected for the race.

- Gilberto Simoni declared to be feeling too tired to participate in the tour this year. His team manager Mauro Gianetti mentioned that Saunier Duval–Prodir intended sending Francisco Ventoso, Juan José Cobo, José Ángel Gómez Marchante, David de la Fuente, Iker Camaño, Rubén Lobato, Christophe Rinero, Iban Mayo and David Millar to the Tour. This leaves Riccardo Riccò and Leonardo Piepoli out of the team.
- Marc Sergeant declared on June 2 that for Predictor–Lotto six riders (Robbie McEwen, Cadel Evans, Chris Horner, Leif Hoste, Wim Vansevenant and Dario Cioni) had already been selected, while six others (Bjorn Leukemans, Mario Aerts, Fred Rodriguez, Roy Sentjens, Bert Roesems and Josep Jufré Pou are still competing for the last three spots. need to prove themselves to join the certainties in France this summer.
- For Rabobank, Manager Erik Breukink created a shortlist of 13 riders who are still in contention on June 8, those are: Michael Boogerd, Bram de Groot, Thomas Dekker, Theo Eltink, Juan Antonio Flecha, Óscar Freire, Mathew Hayman, Pedro Horrillo, Denis Menchov, Koos Moerenhout, Grischa Niermann, Michael Rasmussen and Pieter Weening. The final selection was announced on June 25.
- Will ride for Caisse d'Epargne: Alejandro Valverde, Vladimir Karpets, Óscar Pereiro, Florent Brard, José Vicente García, Francisco Pérez, Nicolas Portal, Luis León Sánchez and Xabier Zandio.
- On June 11, team AG2R Prévoyance named the following riders as certainties for the tour: Cyril Dessel, Christophe Moreau, José Luis Arrieta, Martin Elmiger, Stéphane Goubert and John Gadret. Seven other riders were still in contention for the three remaining places, namely: Simon Gerrans, Sylvain Calzati, Jean-Patrick Nazon, Ludovic Turpin, Hubert Dupont, Alexandre Usov and Yuriy Krivtsov.
- Also on June 11, both Astana Team, Team CSC and T-Mobile Team announced their candidates for the Tour. For Astana Team 12 riders were still in contention: Alexander Vinokourov, Andreas Klöden and 7 other riders from this list: Andrey Kashechkin, Matthias Kessler, Maxim Iglinsky, Antonio Colom, Benoît Joachim, Gennady Mikhaylov, Eddy Mazzoleni, Grégory Rast, Paolo Savoldelli and Sergei Ivanov. T-Mobile Team selected 6 riders (Michael Rogers, Marcus Burghardt, Patrik Sinkewitz, Linus Gerdemann, Kim Kirchen and Mark Cavendish) with three more named nearer the start of the race.
- Damiano Cunego announced on June 14 that he would not be taking part in the Tour de France this year.
- On June 25 it was decided that for Cofidis this year's team would consist of Stéphane Augé, Sylvain Chavanel, Geoffroy Lequatre, Cristian Moreni, Nick Nuyens, Iván Parra, Staf Scheirlinckx, Rik Verbrugghe and Bradley Wiggins. The reserves in case of injury or illness were Leonardo Duque and Kevin De Weert.
- Discovery Channel announced their full team on June 27. Johan Bruyneel, Discovery sport director, announced that Levi Leipheimer would lead assisted by George Hincapie, Egoi Martínez, Benjamín Noval, Yaroslav Popovych, Alberto Contador, Vladimir Gusev, Sérgio Paulinho and Tomas Vaitkus . Following recent illness, there was no space for Tom Danielson.
- For Team CSC, the full squad was announced on June 29. Carlos Sastre leads the team with Fränk Schleck, Fabian Cancellara, David Zabriskie, Stuart O'Grady, Kurt Asle Arvesen, Íñigo Cuesta, Jens Voigt, Christian Vande Velde Due to his 1996 doping admission, Bjarne Riis will not be the team director this year, being replaced by Kim Andersen.
- On 5 July, Team Milram announced that Alessandro Petacchi will not race the Tour de France after his non-negative doping test at this year's Giro d'Italia.
- On 3 July, it was announced that no one would use #1 during the 2007 Tour.
- The full list of riders with race numbers was confirmed by the tour organisers on Friday 6 July

== Teams ==
Caisse d'Epargne (GCE)
Nr.		Age		Pos.
11	Óscar Pereiro	29	(Spain)	10th
12	David Arroyo	27	(Spain)	13th
13	Vicente García Acosta	34	(Spain)	91st
14	Iván Gutiérrez	28	(Spain)	22nd
15	Vladimir Karpets	26	(Russia)	14th
16	Francisco Pérez Sanchez	23	(Spain)	72nd
17	Nicolas Portal	28	(France)	57th
18	Alejandro Valverde	27	(Spain)	6th
19	Xabier Zandio	30	(Spain)	DNF-4
Team manager: José Miguel Echavarri Garcia

T-Mobile Team (TMO)
Nr.		Age		Pos.
21	Michael Rogers	27	(Australia)	DNF-8
22	Marcus Burghardt	24	(Germany)	127th
23	Mark Cavendish	22	(United Kingdom)	DNF-8
24	Bernhard Eisel	26	(Austria)	121st
25	Linus Gerdemann	24	(Germany)	36th
26	Bert Grabsch	32	(Germany)	105th
27	Kim Kirchen	29	(Luxembourg)	7th
28	Axel Merckx	34	(Belgium)	62nd
29	Patrik Sinkewitz	26	(Germany)	DNS-9
Team manager: Bob Stapleton

Team CSC (CSC)
Nr.		Age		Pos.
31	Carlos Sastre	32	(Spain)	4th
32	Kurt Asle Arvesen	32	(Norway)	67th
33	Fabian Cancellara	26	(Switzerland)	100th
34	Íñigo Cuesta	38	(Spain)	51st
35	Stuart O'Grady	33	(Australia)	DNF-8
36	Fränk Schleck	27	(Luxembourg)	17th
37	Christian Vande Velde	31	(United States)	25th
38	Jens Voigt	35	(Germany)	28th
39	David Zabriskie	28	(United States)	DSQ-11
Team manager: Kim Andersen

Predictor–Lotto (PRL)
Nr.		Age		Pos.
41	Cadel Evans	30	(Australia)	2nd
42	Mario Aerts	32	(Belgium)	70th
43	Dario Cioni	32	(Italy)	56th
44	Chris Horner	35	(United States)	15th
45	Leif Hoste	29	(Belgium)	110th
46	Robbie McEwen	35	(Australia)	DSQ-8
47	Fred Rodriguez	33	(United States)	DNF-15
48	Johan Vansummeren	26	(Belgium)	63rd
49	Wim Vansevenant	35	(Belgium)	141st
Team manager: Marc Sergeant

Rabobank (RAB)
Nr.		Age		Pos.
51	Denis Menchov	29	(Russia)	DNF-17
52	Michael Boogerd	35	(Netherlands)	12th
53	Bram de Groot	32	(Netherlands)	134th
54	Thomas Dekker	22	(Netherlands)	35th
55	Juan Antonio Flecha	29	(Spain)	85th
56	Óscar Freire	31	(Spain)	DNS-7
57	Grischa Niermann	32	(Germany)	86th
58	Michael Rasmussen	33	(Denmark)	DNS-17
59	Pieter Weening	26	(Netherlands)	128th
Team manager: Erik Breukink

AG2R Prévoyance (A2R)
Nr.		Age		Pos.
61	Christophe Moreau	36	(France)	37th
62	José Luis Arrieta	36	(Spain)	52nd
63	Sylvain Calzati	28	(France)	DNF-11
64	Cyril Dessel	32	(France)	DNF-15
65	Martin Elmiger	28	(Switzerland)	74th
66	John Gadret	28	(France)	54th
67	Simon Gerrans	27	(Australia)	94th
68	Stéphane Goubert	37	(France)	27th
69	Ludovic Turpin	32	(France)	44th
Team manager: Vincent Lavenu

Euskaltel–Euskadi (EUS)
Nr.		Age		Pos.
71	Haimar Zubeldia	28	(Spain)	5th
72	Igor Antón	24	(Spain)	DNF-11
73	Mikel Astarloza	27	(Spain)	9th
74	Jorge Azanza	25	(Spain)	82nd
75	Iñaki Isasi	30	(Spain)	90th
76	Iñigo Landaluze	30	(Spain)	43rd
77	Rubén Pérez	25	(Spain)	50th
78	Amets Txurruka	24	(Spain)	23rd
79	Gorka Verdugo	28	(Spain)	48th
Team manager: Julián Gorospe

Lampre–Fondital (LAM)
Nr.		Age		Pos.
81	Alessandro Ballan	27	(Italy)	88th
82	Daniele Bennati	26	(Italy)	75th
83	Paolo Bossoni	31	(Italy)	95th
84	Marzio Bruseghin	33	(Italy)	41st
85	Claudio Corioni	24	(Italy)	126th
86	Danilo Napolitano	26	(Italy)	DSQ-8
87	Daniele Righi	31	(Italy)	96th
88	Tadej Valjavec	30	(Slovenia)	19th
89	Patxi Vila	31	(Spain)	29th
Team manager: Giuseppe Saronni

Team Gerolsteiner (GST)
Nr.		Age		Pos.
91	Stefan Schumacher	25	(Germany)	87th
92	Robert Förster	29	(Germany)	135th
93	Markus Fothen	25	(Germany)	34th
94	Heinrich Haussler	23	(Australia)	129th
95	Bernhard Kohl	25	(Austria)	31st
96	Sven Krauss	24	(Germany)	137th
97	Ronny Scholz	29	(Germany)	81st
98	Fabian Wegmann	27	(Germany)	60th
99	Peter Wrolich	33	(Austria)	133rd
Team manager: Hans-Michael Holczer

Crédit Agricole (C.A)
Nr.		Age		Pos.
101	Thor Hushovd	29	(Norway)	139th
102	William Bonnet	25	(France)	109th
103	Alexander Bocharov	32	(Russia)	33rd
104	Anthony Charteau	27	(France)	136th
105	Julian Dean	32	(New Zealand)	107th
106	Dmitry Fofonov	30	(Kazakhstan)	26th
107	Patrice Halgand	33	(France)	30th
108	Sebastien Hinault	33	(France)	132nd
109	Christophe Le Mével	26	(France)	DNF-15
Team manager: Roger Legeay

Discovery Channel Pro Cycling Team (DSC)
Nr.		Age		Pos.
111	Levi Leipheimer	33	(United States)	3rd
112	Alberto Contador	24	(Spain)	1st
113	Vladimir Gusev	25	(Russia)	38th
114	George Hincapie	34	(United States)	24th
115	Egoi Martínez	29	(Spain)	61st
116	Benjamín Noval	26	(Spain)	115th
117	Sérgio Paulinho	27	(Portugal)	65th
118	Yaroslav Popovych	27	(Ukraine)	8th
119	Tomas Vaitkus	25	(Lithuania)	DNS-3
Team manager: Johan Bruyneel

Bouygues Télécom (BTL)
Nr.		Age		Pos.
121	Pierrick Fédrigo	28	(France)	84th
122	Stef Clement	24	(Netherlands)	DSQ-12
123	Xavier Florencio	27	(Spain)	46th
124	Anthony Geslin	27	(France)	98th
125	Laurent Lefèvre	31	(France)	58th
126	Jérôme Pineau	27	(France)	68th
127	Matthieu Sprick	25	(France)	DNF-16
128	Johann Tschopp	25	(Switzerland)	93rd
129	Thomas Voeckler	28	(France)	66th
Team manager: Jean-René Bernaudeau

Agritubel (AGR)
Nr.		Age		Pos.
131	Juan Miguel Mercado	28	(Spain)	80th
132	Freddy Bichot	27	(France)	102nd
133	Moisés Dueñas	26	(Spain)	39th
134	Romain Feillu	23	(France)	DNF-8
135	Eduardo Gonzalo	23	(Spain)	DNF-1
136	Cédric Herve	27	(France)	DSQ-8
137	Nicolas Jalabert	34	(France)	114th
138	Benoît Salmon	33	(France)	125th
139	Nicolas Vogondy	29	(France)	92nd
Team manager: David Fornes

Cofidis, Le Crédit par Téléphone (COF)
Nr.		Age		Pos.
141	Sylvain Chavanel	28	(France)	DNS-17
142	Stéphane Augé	32	(France)	DNS-17
143	Geoffroy Lequatre	26	(France)	DNS-6
144	Cristian Moreni	34	(Italy)	DNS-17
145	Nick Nuyens	27	(Belgium)	DNS-17
146	Iván Parra	31	(Colombia)	DNF-8
147	Staf Scheirlinckx	28	(Belgium)	DNS-17
148	Rik Verbrugghe	32	(Belgium)	DNS-17
149	Bradley Wiggins	27	(United Kingdom)	DNS-17
Team manager: Éric Boyer

Liquigas (LIQ)
Nr.		Age		Pos.
151	Filippo Pozzato	25	(Italy)	DNS-15
152	Michael Albasini	26	(Switzerland)	59th
153	Manuel Beltrán	36	(Spain)	18th
154	Kjell Carlström	30	(Finland)	76th
155	Murilo Fischer	28	(Brazil)	101st
156	Aleksandr Kuschynski	27	(Belarus)	89th
157	Manuel Quinziato	27	(Italy)	113th
158	Charlie Wegelius	29	(United Kingdom)	45th
159	Frederik Willems	27	(Belgium)	73rd
Team manager: Roberto Amadio

Française des Jeux (FDJ)
Nr.		Age		Pos.
161	Sandy Casar	28	(France)	71st
162	Sébastien Chavanel	26	(France)	130th
163	Mickaël Delage	21	(France)	117th
164	Rémy Di Gregorio	21	(France)	DNS-5
165	Philippe Gilbert	25	(Belgium)	DNS-15
166	Lilian Jégou	31	(France)	97th
167	Mathieu Ladagnous	22	(France)	112th
168	Thomas Lövkvist	23	(Sweden)	64th
169	Benoît Vaugrenard	25	(France)	83rd
Team manager: Marc Madiot

Quick-Step–Innergetic (QSI)
Nr.		Age		Pos.
171	Tom Boonen	26	(Belgium)	119th
172	Carlos Barredo	26	(Spain)	42nd
173	Steven de Jongh	33	(Netherlands)	123rd
174	Juan Manuel Gárate	31	(Spain)	21st
175	Sébastien Rosseler	25	(Belgium)	104th
176	Gert Steegmans	26	(Belgium)	138th
177	Bram Tankink	28	(Netherlands)	40th
178	Matteo Tosatto	33	(Italy)	108th
179	Cedric Vasseur	36	(France)	55th
Team manager: Patrick Lefevere

Team Milram (MRM)
Nr.		Age		Pos.
181	Erik Zabel	37	(Germany)	79th
182	Alessandro Cortinovis	29	(Italy)	122nd
183	Ralf Grabsch	34	(Germany)	116th
184	Andriy Hryvko	23	(Ukraine)	78th
185	Christian Knees	26	(Germany)	47th
186	Brett Lancaster	27	(Australia)	DNF-5
187	Alberto Ongarato	31	(Italy)	DNF-12
188	Enrico Poitschke	37	(Germany)	131st
189	Marcel Sieberg	25	(Germany)	120th
Team manager: Gianluigi Stanga

Astana Team (AST)
Nr.		Age		Pos.
191	Alexander Vinokourov	33	(Kazakhstan)	DNS-16
192	Antonio Colom	29	(Spain)	DNS-16
193	Maxim Iglinsky	26	(Kazakhstan)	DNS-16
194	Sergei Ivanov	32	(Russia)	DNS-16
195	Andrey Kashechkin	27	(Kazakhstan)	DNS-16
196	Andreas Klöden	32	(Germany)	DNS-16
197	Daniel Navarro Garcia	23	(Spain)	DNS-16
198	Grégory Rast	27	(Switzerland)	DNS-16
199	Paolo Savoldelli	34	(Italy)	DNS-16
Team manager: Mario Kummer

Saunier Duval–Prodir (SDV)
Nr.		Age		Pos.
201	David Millar	30	(United Kingdom)	69th
202	Iker Camaño	28	(Spain)	53rd
203	David Canada	32	(Spain)	103rd
204	Juan José Cobo	26	(Spain)	20th
205	David de la Fuente	26	(Spain)	49th
206	Rubén Lobato	28	(Spain)	DNS-7
207	Iban Mayo	29	(Spain)	16th
208	Christophe Rinero	33	(France)	77th
209	Francisco Ventoso	25	(Spain)	DNS-14
Team manager: Mauro Gianetti

Barloworld (BAR)
Nr.		Age		Pos.
211	Alexander Efimkin	25	(Russia)	99th
212	Félix Cárdenas	34	(Colombia)	106th
213	Giampaolo Cheula	28	(Italy)	111th
214	Enrico Degano	31	(Italy)	DNF-7
215	Geraint Thomas	21	(United Kingdom)	140th
216	Robert Hunter	30	(South Africa)	118th
217	Paolo Longo Borghini	26	(Italy)	124th
218	Kanstantsin Sivtsov	24	(Belarus)	32nd
219	Mauricio Soler	24	(Colombia)	11th
Team manager: Claudio Corti

== Cyclists ==
No.	Name	Nationality	Team	Age	Pos.
11	Óscar Pereiro	Spain	Caisse d'Epargne	29	10
12	David Arroyo	Spain	Caisse d'Epargne	27	13
13	Vicente García Acosta	Spain	Caisse d'Epargne	34	91
14	Iván Gutiérrez	Spain	Caisse d'Epargne	28	22
15	Vladimir Karpets	Russia	Caisse d'Epargne	26	14
16	Francisco Pérez Sanchez	Spain	Caisse d'Epargne	23	72
17	Nicolas Portal	France	Caisse d'Epargne	28	57
18	Alejandro Valverde	Spain	Caisse d'Epargne	27	6
19	Xabier Zandio	Spain	Caisse d'Epargne	30	DNF-4
21	Michael Rogers	Australia	T-Mobile Team	27	DNF-8
22	Marcus Burghardt	Germany	T-Mobile Team	24	127
23	Mark Cavendish	Great Britain	T-Mobile Team	22	DNF-8
24	Bernhard Eisel	Austria	T-Mobile Team	26	121
25	Linus Gerdemann	Germany	T-Mobile Team	24	36
26	Bert Grabsch	Germany	T-Mobile Team	32	105
27	Kim Kirchen	Luxembourg	T-Mobile Team	29	7
28	Axel Merckx	Belgium	T-Mobile Team	34	62
29	Patrik Sinkewitz	Germany	T-Mobile Team	26	DNS-9
31	Carlos Sastre	Spain	Team CSC	32	4
32	Kurt Asle Arvesen	Norway	Team CSC	32	67
33	Fabian Cancellara	Switzerland	Team CSC	26	100
34	Íñigo Cuesta	Spain	Team CSC	38	51
35	Stuart O'Grady	Australia	Team CSC	33	DNF-8
36	Fränk Schleck	Luxembourg	Team CSC	27	17
37	Christian Vande Velde	United States	Team CSC	31	25
38	Jens Voigt	Germany	Team CSC	35	28
39	David Zabriskie	United States	Team CSC	28	DSQ-11
41	Cadel Evans	Australia	Predictor–Lotto	30	2
42	Mario Aerts	Belgium	Predictor–Lotto	32	70
43	Dario Cioni	Italy	Predictor–Lotto	32	56
44	Chris Horner	United States	Predictor–Lotto	35	15
45	Leif Hoste	Belgium	Predictor–Lotto	29	110
46	Robbie McEwen	Australia	Predictor–Lotto	35	DSQ-8
47	Fred Rodriguez	United States	Predictor–Lotto	33	DNF-15
48	Johan Vansummeren	Belgium	Predictor–Lotto	26	63
49	Wim Vansevenant	Belgium	Predictor–Lotto	35	141
51	Denis Menchov	Russia	Rabobank	29	DNF-17
52	Michael Boogerd	Netherlands	Rabobank	35	12
53	Bram de Groot	Netherlands	Rabobank	32	134
54	Thomas Dekker	Netherlands	Rabobank	22	35
55	Juan Antonio Flecha	Spain	Rabobank	29	85
56	Óscar Freire	Spain	Rabobank	31	DNS-7
57	Grischa Niermann	Germany	Rabobank	32	86
58	Michael Rasmussen	Denmark	Rabobank	33	DNS-17
59	Pieter Weening	Netherlands	Rabobank	26	128
61	Christophe Moreau	France	AG2R Prévoyance	36	37
62	José Luis Arrieta	Spain	AG2R Prévoyance	36	52
63	Sylvain Calzati	France	AG2R Prévoyance	28	DNF-11
64	Cyril Dessel	France	AG2R Prévoyance	32	DNF-15
65	Martin Elmiger	Switzerland	AG2R Prévoyance	28	74
66	John Gadret	France	AG2R Prévoyance	28	54
67	Simon Gerrans	Australia	AG2R Prévoyance	27	94
68	Stéphane Goubert	France	AG2R Prévoyance	37	27
69	Ludovic Turpin	France	AG2R Prévoyance	32	44
71	Haimar Zubeldia	Spain	Euskaltel–Euskadi	28	5
72	Igor Antón	Spain	Euskaltel–Euskadi	24	DNF-11
73	Mikel Astarloza	Spain	Euskaltel–Euskadi	27	9
74	Jorge Azanza	Spain	Euskaltel–Euskadi	25	82
75	Iñaki Isasi	Spain	Euskaltel–Euskadi	30	90
76	Iñigo Landaluze	Spain	Euskaltel–Euskadi	30	43
77	Rubén Pérez	Spain	Euskaltel–Euskadi	25	50
78	Amets Txurruka	Spain	Euskaltel–Euskadi	24	23
79	Gorka Verdugo	Spain	Euskaltel–Euskadi	28	48
81	Alessandro Ballan	Italy	Lampre–Fondital	27	88
82	Daniele Bennati	Italy	Lampre–Fondital	26	75
83	Paolo Bossoni	Italy	Lampre–Fondital	31	95
84	Marzio Bruseghin	Italy	Lampre–Fondital	33	41
85	Claudio Corioni	Italy	Lampre–Fondital	24	126
86	Danilo Napolitano	Italy	Lampre–Fondital	26	DSQ-8
87	Daniele Righi	Italy	Lampre–Fondital	31	96
88	Tadej Valjavec	Slovenia	Lampre–Fondital	30	19
89	Patxi Vila	Spain	Lampre–Fondital	31	29
91	Stefan Schumacher	Germany	Team Gerolsteiner	25	87
92	Robert Förster	Germany	Team Gerolsteiner	29	135
93	Markus Fothen	Germany	Team Gerolsteiner	25	34
94	Heinrich Haussler	Australia	Team Gerolsteiner	23	129
95	Bernhard Kohl	Austria	Team Gerolsteiner	25	31
96	Sven Krauss	Germany	Team Gerolsteiner	24	137
97	Ronny Scholz	Germany	Team Gerolsteiner	29	81
98	Fabian Wegmann	Germany	Team Gerolsteiner	27	60
99	Peter Wrolich	Austria	Team Gerolsteiner	33	133
101	Thor Hushovd	Norway	Crédit Agricole	29	139
102	William Bonnet	France	Crédit Agricole	25	109
103	Alexander Bocharov	Russia	Crédit Agricole	32	33
104	Anthony Charteau	France	Crédit Agricole	27	136
105	Julian Dean	New Zealand	Crédit Agricole	32	107
106	Dmitry Fofonov	Kazakhstan	Crédit Agricole	30	26
107	Patrice Halgand	France	Crédit Agricole	33	30
108	Sebastien Hinault	France	Crédit Agricole	33	132
109	Christophe Le Mével	France	Crédit Agricole	26	DNF-15
111	Levi Leipheimer	United States	Discovery Channel Pro Cycling Team	33	3
112	Alberto Contador	Spain	Discovery Channel Pro Cycling Team	24	1
113	Vladimir Gusev	Russia	Discovery Channel Pro Cycling Team	25	38
114	George Hincapie	United States	Discovery Channel Pro Cycling Team	34	24
115	Egoi Martínez	Spain	Discovery Channel Pro Cycling Team	29	61
116	Benjamín Noval	Spain	Discovery Channel Pro Cycling Team	26	115
117	Sérgio Paulinho	Portugal	Discovery Channel Pro Cycling Team	27	65
118	Yaroslav Popovych	Ukraine	Discovery Channel Pro Cycling Team	27	8
119	Tomas Vaitkus	Lithuania	Discovery Channel Pro Cycling Team	25	DNS-3
121	Pierrick Fédrigo	France	Bouygues Télécom	28	84
122	Stef Clement	Netherlands	Bouygues Télécom	24	DSQ-12
123	Xavier Florencio	Spain	Bouygues Télécom	27	46
124	Anthony Geslin	France	Bouygues Télécom	27	98
125	Laurent Lefèvre	France	Bouygues Télécom	31	58
126	Jérôme Pineau	France	Bouygues Télécom	27	68
127	Matthieu Sprick	France	Bouygues Télécom	25	DNF-16
128	Johann Tschopp	Switzerland	Bouygues Télécom	25	93
129	Thomas Voeckler	France	Bouygues Télécom	28	66
131	Juan Miguel Mercado	Spain	Agritubel	28	80
132	Freddy Bichot	France	Agritubel	27	102
133	Moisés Dueñas	Spain	Agritubel	26	39
134	Romain Feillu	France	Agritubel	23	DNF-8
135	Eduardo Gonzalo	Spain	Agritubel	23	DNF-1
136	Cédric Herve	France	Agritubel	27	DSQ-8
137	Nicolas Jalabert	France	Agritubel	34	114
138	Benoît Salmon	France	Agritubel	33	125
139	Nicolas Vogondy	France	Agritubel	29	92
141	Sylvain Chavanel	France	Cofidis, Le Crédit par Téléphone	28	DNS-17
142	Stéphane Augé	France	Cofidis, Le Crédit par Téléphone	32	DNS-17
143	Geoffroy Lequatre	France	Cofidis, Le Crédit par Téléphone	26	DNS-6
144	Cristian Moreni	Italy	Cofidis, Le Crédit par Téléphone	34	DNS-17
145	Nick Nuyens	Belgium	Cofidis, Le Crédit par Téléphone	27	DNS-17
146	Iván Parra	Colombia	Cofidis, Le Crédit par Téléphone	31	DNF-8
147	Staf Scheirlinckx	Belgium	Cofidis, Le Crédit par Téléphone	28	DNS-17
148	Rik Verbrugghe	Belgium	Cofidis, Le Crédit par Téléphone	32	DNS-17
149	Bradley Wiggins	Great Britain	Cofidis, Le Crédit par Téléphone	27	DNS-17
151	Filippo Pozzato	Italy	Liquigas	25	DNS-15
152	Michael Albasini	Switzerland	Liquigas	26	59
153	Manuel Beltrán	Spain	Liquigas	36	18
154	Kjell Carlström	Finland	Liquigas	30	76
155	Murilo Fischer	Brazil	Liquigas	28	101
156	Aleksandr Kuschynski	Belarus	Liquigas	27	89
157	Manuel Quinziato	Italy	Liquigas	27	113
158	Charlie Wegelius	Great Britain	Liquigas	29	45
159	Frederik Willems	Belgium	Liquigas	27	73
161	Sandy Casar	France	Française des Jeux	28	71
162	Sébastien Chavanel	France	Française des Jeux	26	130
163	Mickaël Delage	France	Française des Jeux	21	117
164	Rémy Di Gregorio	France	Française des Jeux	21	DNS-5
165	Philippe Gilbert	Belgium	Française des Jeux	25	DNS-15
166	Lilian Jégou	France	Française des Jeux	31	97
167	Mathieu Ladagnous	France	Française des Jeux	22	112
168	Thomas Lövkvist	Sweden	Française des Jeux	23	64
169	Benoît Vaugrenard	France	Française des Jeux	25	83
171	Tom Boonen	Belgium	Quick-Step–Innergetic	26	119
172	Carlos Barredo	Spain	Quick-Step–Innergetic	26	42
173	Steven de Jongh	Netherlands	Quick-Step–Innergetic	33	123
174	Juan Manuel Gárate	Spain	Quick-Step–Innergetic	31	21
175	Sébastien Rosseler	Belgium	Quick-Step–Innergetic	25	104
176	Gert Steegmans	Belgium	Quick-Step–Innergetic	26	138
177	Bram Tankink	Netherlands	Quick-Step–Innergetic	28	40
178	Matteo Tosatto	Italy	Quick-Step–Innergetic	33	108
179	Cedric Vasseur	France	Quick-Step–Innergetic	36	55
181	Erik Zabel	Germany	Team Milram	37	79
182	Alessandro Cortinovis	Italy	Team Milram	29	122
183	Ralf Grabsch	Germany	Team Milram	34	116
184	Andriy Hryvko	Ukraine	Team Milram	23	78
185	Christian Knees	Germany	Team Milram	26	47
186	Brett Lancaster	Australia	Team Milram	27	DNF-5
187	Alberto Ongarato	Italy	Team Milram	31	DNF-12
188	Enrico Poitschke	Germany	Team Milram	37	131
189	Marcel Sieberg	Germany	Team Milram	25	120
191	Alexander Vinokourov	Kazakhstan	Astana Team	33	DNS-16
192	Antonio Colom	Spain	Astana Team	29	DNS-16
193	Maxim Iglinsky	Kazakhstan	Astana Team	26	DNS-16
194	Sergei Ivanov	Russia	Astana Team	32	DNS-16
195	Andrey Kashechkin	Kazakhstan	Astana Team	27	DNS-16
196	Andreas Klöden	Germany	Astana Team	32	DNS-16
197	Daniel Navarro Garcia	Spain	Astana Team	23	DNS-16
198	Grégory Rast	Switzerland	Astana Team	27	DNS-16
199	Paolo Savoldelli	Italy	Astana Team	34	DNS-16
201	David Millar	Great Britain	Saunier Duval–Prodir	30	69
202	Iker Camaño	Spain	Saunier Duval–Prodir	28	53
203	David Canada	Spain	Saunier Duval–Prodir	32	103
204	Juan José Cobo	Spain	Saunier Duval–Prodir	26	20
205	David de la Fuente	Spain	Saunier Duval–Prodir	26	49
206	Rubén Lobato	Spain	Saunier Duval–Prodir	28	DNS-7
207	Iban Mayo	Spain	Saunier Duval–Prodir	29	16
208	Christophe Rinero	France	Saunier Duval–Prodir	33	77
209	Francisco Ventoso	Spain	Saunier Duval–Prodir	25	DNS-14
211	Alexander Efimkin	Russia	Barloworld	25	99
212	Félix Cárdenas	Colombia	Barloworld	34	106
213	Giampaolo Cheula	Italy	Barloworld	28	111
214	Enrico Degano	Italy	Barloworld	31	DNF-7
215	Geraint Thomas	Great Britain	Barloworld	21	140
216	Robert Hunter	South Africa	Barloworld	30	118
217	Paolo Longo Borghini	Italy	Barloworld	26	124
218	Kanstantsin Sivtsov	Belarus	Barloworld	24	32
219	Mauricio Soler	Colombia	Barloworld	24	11

== Summary of the field ==
- Spain has most riders with 41. France has 36.
- 26 nations are represented.
- Euskaltel is the only team that has all its riders from the same country.
- There are six current road race national champions: Dean, Hincapie, Iglinsky, Moreau, Valjavec and Wegmann, and seven current time trial national champions: Zabriskie, Cancellara, Clement, B. Grabsch, Gusev, Gutierrez and Vaugrenard.
- There is no earlier Tour de France general classification winner in the Tour. (Pereiro was awarded 2006 win in September 2007)
- Three riders have won a Grand Tour: Savoldelli (Giro 2002&2005), Menchov (Vuelta 2005) and Vinokourov (Vuelta 2006).
- Three riders have won points competition in Tour de France: Zabel (1996–2001), McEwen (2002, 2004, 2006) and Hushovd (2005).
- Two riders have won the King of the Mountains competition in Tour de France: Rinero (1998) and Rasmussen (2005–06).
- Four riders have won the U25 competition in Tour de France: Salmon (1999), Menchov (2003), Karpets (2004) and Popovych (2005).
- 36 riders have won a stage in Tour de France earlier: Boogerd, Boonen, Calzati, Cancellara, Cardenas, Fedrigo, Flecha, Freire, García Acosta, Halgand, Hincapie, Hushovd, Ivanov, Mayo, McEwen, Menchov, Mercado, Millar, Moreau, O'Grady, Pereiro, Popovych, Pozzato, Rasmussen, Sastre, Savoldelli, Schleck, Tosatto, Valverde, Vasseur, Verbrugghe, Vinokourov, Voigt, Weening, Zabel and Zabriskie.
- Riders who won their first Tour de France stage in 2007: Bennati, Casar, Contador, Gerdemann, Hunter, Leipheimer, Soler, Steegmans. Evans and Kirchen were awarded stage wins in 2008, after Alexander Vinokourov was removed from the stage results.
- 15 riders who have worn the yellow jersey: Boonen, Cancellara, Dessel, Hincapie, Hushovd, McEwen, Millar, Moreau, O'Grady, Pereiro, Vasseur, Voeckler, Voigt, Zabel and Zabriskie.
- Riders who wore yellow jersey for the first time in 2007: Contador, Gerdemann, Rasmussen.
- 21 riders who finished Giro d'Italia earlier this year: Aerts, Arroyo, Arvesen, Bruseghin, Cañada, Cioni, Cortinovis, Dean, Förster, Jegou, Knees, Krauss, Lancaster, Mayo, Merckx, Parra, Rasmussen, Savoldelli, Tosatto, Vila, Zabriskie.
- 10 riders who started Giro but abandoned: Cancellara, Halgand, Hincapie, Hushovd, McEwen, Napolitano, Ongarato, Popovych, Voeckler, Wegelius.

== See also ==
- 2007 Tour de France
- List of teams and cyclists in the 2006 Tour de France
