= 2007 Tour de Romandie =

2007 UCI ProTour, race 11 of 26

Race details
- Dates: 1–6 May
- Stages: 5 + Prologue
- Distance: 666.5 km (414.1 mi)
- Winning time: 17h 27' 02"

Results
Jersey awarded to the overall winner	Winner	Thomas Dekker (NED)	(Rabobank)
	Second	Paolo Savoldelli (ITA)	(Astana)
	Third	Andrey Kashechkin (KAZ)	(Astana)
Jersey awarded to the points classification winner	Points	Thomas Dekker (NED)	(Rabobank)
Jersey awarded to the mountains classification winner	Mountains	Laurent Brochard (FRA)	(Bouygues Télécom)
Jersey awarded to the sprints classification winner	Sprints	Patrick Calcagni (SUI)	(Liquigas)

The 2007 Tour de Romandie was the 61st edition of the Tour de Romandie and the 11th event of the 2007 UCI ProTour. The race was held from 1 to 6 May in the French-speaking area of Switzerland known as Romandy. The race winner was Thomas Dekker of Rabobank.

== Teams ==
Twenty-one teams participated in the race.

- AG2R Prévoyance
- Astana
- Bouygues Télécom
- Caisse d'Epargne
- Cofidis
- Crédit Agricole
- Discovery Channel
- Euskaltel–Euskadi
- Française des Jeux
- Gerolsteiner
- Lampre–Fondital
- Liquigas
- Predictor–Lotto
- Quick-Step–Innergetic
- Rabobank
- Saunier Duval–Prodir
- T-Mobile Team
- Team CSC
- Team LPR
- Team Milram
- Unibet.com

== Stages ==
=== Prologue ===
1 May — Fribourg, 3.5 kilometres (2.2 mi) (ITT)

Italian Paolo Savoldelli (Astana) repeats his win in last year's prologue with a time of 4 minutes, 35 seconds over the 3.5 kilometre course at 45.82 kilometres per hour (28.47 mph).

Prologue results
Rank	Rider	Team	Time
1	Paolo Savoldelli (ITA)	Astana	4' 35"
2	Roman Kreuziger (CZE)	Liquigas	+ 5"
3	Chris Horner (USA)	Predictor–Lotto	+ 7"
4	Andrey Kashechkin (KAZ)	Astana	+ 9"
5	Sandy Casar (FRA)	Française des Jeux	+ 10"
6	Andrey Mizurov (KAZ)	Astana	+ 10"
7	Brett Lancaster (AUS)	Team Milram	+ 11"
8	Hubert Schwab (SUI)	Quick-Step–Innergetic	+ 11"
9	Rigoberto Urán (COL)	Unibet.com	+ 11"
10	Jurgen Van den Broeck (BEL)	Predictor–Lotto	+ 11"

=== Stage 1 ===
2 May – Granges-Paccot to La Chaux de Fonds, 157.8 kilometres (98.1 mi)

Germany's hope for the future, Markus Fothen of Gerolsteiner, took the win after he escaped in the finale together with Francisco Pérez. Fothen beat him in a classical sprint-a-deux. The peloton bunch sprint was just behind the two leaders.

Stage 1 results
Rank	Rider	Team	Time
1	Markus Fothen (GER)	Gerolsteiner	4h 08' 58"
2	Francisco Pérez (ESP)	Caisse d'Epargne	+ 0"
3	Joaquim Rodríguez (ESP)	Caisse d'Epargne	+ 0"
4	Mirco Lorenzetto (ITA)	Team Milram	+ 0"
5	Cadel Evans (AUS)	Predictor–Lotto	+ 0"
6	Leonardo Duque (COL)	Cofidis	+ 0"
7	Karsten Kroon (NED)	Team CSC	+ 0"
8	Enrico Gasparotto (ITA)	Liquigas	+ 0"
9	Andreas Dietziker (SUI)	Team LPR	+ 0"
10	Theo Eltink (NED)	Rabobank	+ 0"

=== Stage 2 ===
3 May – La Chaux de Fonds to Lucens, 166.9 kilometres (103.7 mi)

The only real sprinter stage of this edition of the Tour de Romandie was an easy win for Australian rider Robbie McEwen. The Predictor–Lotto rider held off Borut Božič with ease.

Stage 2 results
Rank	Rider	Team	Time
1	Robbie McEwen (AUS)	Predictor–Lotto	4h 01' 41"
2	Borut Božič (SLO)	Team LPR	+ 0"
3	Enrico Gasparotto (ITA)	Liquigas	+ 0"
4	Julian Dean (NZL)	Crédit Agricole	+ 0"
5	Martin Elmiger (SUI)	AG2R Prévoyance	+ 0"
6	Greg Henderson (NZL)	T-Mobile Team	+ 0"
7	Igor Abakoumov (BEL)	Astana	+ 0"
8	Aitor Galdós (ESP)	Euskaltel–Euskadi	+ 0"
9	Mirco Lorenzetto (ITA)	Team Milram	+ 0"
10	Markus Fothen (GER)	Gerolsteiner	+ 0"

=== Stage 3 ===
4 May – Moudon to Charmey, 162.6 kilometres (101.0 mi)

Although the course was difficult, the favourites did not perform as expected. And thus, the escapees got their shot at winning a stage. After a stage win in the Tirreno–Adriatico, Lampre–Fondital cyclist Matteo Bono added another nice win to his palmares. He held off Japan's Fumiyuki Beppu in the sprint. Beppu did score the first Pro Tour points ever for Japan.

Stage 3 results
Rank	Rider	Team	Time
1	Matteo Bono (ITA)	Lampre–Fondital	4h 04' 15"
2	Fumiyuki Beppu (JAP)	Discovery Channel	+ 0"
3	Marco Pinotti (ITA)	T-Mobile Team	+ 2"
4	Christophe Moreau (FRA)	AG2R Prévoyance	+ 3' 51"
5	Thomas Dekker (NED)	Rabobank	+ 3' 51"
6	Andrea Tonti (ITA)	T-Mobile Team	+ 3' 51"
7	Theo Eltink (NED)	Rabobank	+ 3' 51"
8	Roger Beuchat (SUI)	Team LPR	+ 3' 51"
9	Markus Fothen (GER)	Gerolsteiner	+ 3' 51"
10	Patrick Calcagni (SUI)	Liquigas	+ 3' 51"

=== Stage 4 ===
5 May – Charmey to Pas de Morgins, 155.9 kilometres (96.9 mi)

A long break by Lampre–Fondital rider Gorazd Štangelj finished with 8 kilometres to go. By then, Astana's Eddy Mazzoleni upped the pace. He thinned out the group until there were about 15 riders left. Attacks followed by José Ángel Gómez Marchante and Sylwester Szmyd. But the only real successful attack was by Spaniard Igor Antón. Dutch rider Thomas Dekker saw the danger and took over from Mazzoleni. As a result, only five riders could follow. American Predictor–Lotto cyclist Chris Horner attacked with 4 kilometres to go. Dekker replied instantly and with much pain and suffering also Frenchman John Gadret managed to follow. The trio caught up with Antón, who was happy to sit in last wheel and follow. Although Dekker made the strongest impression and tried to get away twice, it was Antón who took the win. Dekker disputed the win due to a seemingly irregular sprint by Antón. But his protest was denied.

Stage 4 results
Rank	Rider	Team	Time
1	Igor Antón (ESP)	Euskaltel–Euskadi	4h 36' 56"
2	Thomas Dekker (NED)	Rabobank	+ 0"
3	Chris Horner (USA)	Predictor–Lotto	+ 0"
4	John Gadret (FRA)	AG2R Prévoyance	+ 2"
5	Cadel Evans (AUS)	Predictor–Lotto	+ 16"
6	Sylwester Szmyd (POL)	Lampre–Fondital	+ 16"
7	Andy Schleck (LUX)	Team CSC	+ 16"
8	Paolo Savoldelli (ITA)	Astana	+ 16"
9	Andrey Kashechkin (KAZ)	Astana	+ 23"
10	Joaquim Rodríguez (ESP)	Caisse d'Epargne	+ 16"

=== Stage 5 ===
6 May – Lausanne, 20.4 kilometres (12.7 mi) ITT

In the finishing time trial around Lausanne, Thomas Dekker didn't allow his competitors to have any hopes of winning the Tour de Romandie. Only Astana riders Paolo Savoldelli and Andrey Kashechkin stayed somewhat in the vicinity of Dekker. The young Dutch hope of winning the Tour de France in the future did a triple strike by winning the time trial, the final general classification and the points classification.

Stage 5 results
Rank	Rider	Team	Time
1	Thomas Dekker (NED)	Rabobank	26' 36"
2	Paolo Savoldelli (ITA)	Astana	+ 5"
3	Andrey Kashechkin (KAZ)	Astana	+ 12"
4	Cadel Evans (AUS)	Predictor–Lotto	+ 23"
5	Eddy Mazzoleni (ITA)	Astana	+ 46"
6	Roman Kreuziger (CZE)	Liquigas	+ 52"
7	Chris Horner (USA)	Predictor–Lotto	+ 55"
8	David Zabriskie (USA)	Team CSC	+ 57"
9	Sandy Casar (FRA)	Française des Jeux	+ 1' 01"
10	Janez Brajkovič (SLO)	Discovery Channel	+ 1' 05"

== Classification standings ==
=== General classification ===
Final general classification (1–10)
Rank	Rider	Team	Time
1	Thomas Dekker (NED)	Rabobank	17h 27' 02"
2	Paolo Savoldelli (ITA)	Astana	+ 11"
3	Andrey Kashechkin (KAZ)	Astana	+ 34"
4	Cadel Evans (AUS)	Predictor–Lotto	+ 43"
5	Chris Horner (USA)	Predictor–Lotto	+ 46"
6	Roman Kreuziger (CZE)	Liquigas	+ 1' 35"
7	Igor Antón (ESP)	Euskaltel–Euskadi	+ 1' 51"
8	Andy Schleck (LUX)	Team CSC	+ 1' 53"
9	Sylwester Szmyd (POL)	Lampre–Fondital	+ 1' 55"
10	Janez Brajkovič (SLO)	Discovery Channel	+ 2' 00"

=== Mountains classification ===
Final mountains classification (1–10)
Rank	Rider	Team	Points
1	Laurent Brochard (FRA)	Bouygues Télécom	64
2	Chris Anker Sørensen (DEN)	Team CSC	42
3	Eros Capecchi (ITA)	Liquigas	30
4	Gorazd Štangelj (SLO)	Lampre–Fondital	18
5	Marco Pinotti (ITA)	T-Mobile Team	18
6	Chris Horner (USA)	Predictor–Lotto	12
7	Iván Ramiro Parra (COL)	Cofidis	12
8	Thomas Dekker (NED)	Rabobank	8
9	Amets Txurruka (ESP)	Euskaltel–Euskadi	8
10	Marco Marzano (ITA)	Lampre–Fondital	8

=== Points classification ===
Final points classification (1–10)
Rank	Rider	Team	Points
1	Thomas Dekker (NED)	Rabobank	43
2	Paolo Savoldelli (ITA)	Astana	35
3	Markus Fothen (GER)	Gerolsteiner	32
4	Chris Horner (USA)	Predictor–Lotto	32
5	Cadel Evans (AUS)	Predictor–Lotto	31
6	Andrey Kashechkin (KAZ)	Astana	26
7	Igor Antón (ESP)	Euskaltel–Euskadi	25
8	Roman Kreuziger (CZE)	Liquigas	23
9	Joaquim Rodríguez (ESP)	Caisse d'Epargne	22
10	Francisco Pérez (ESP)	Caisse d'Epargne	20

=== Sprints classification ===
Final sprints classification (1–10)
Rank	Rider	Team	Points
1	Patrick Calcagni (SUI)	Liquigas	10
2	László Bodrogi (HUN)	Crédit Agricole	9
3	Sandy Casar (FRA)	Française des Jeux	7
4	Marco Pinotti (ITA)	T-Mobile Team	7
5	Laurent Brochard (FRA)	Bouygues Télécom	7
6	Gorazd Štangelj (SLO)	Lampre–Fondital	7
7	Chris Horner (USA)	Predictor–Lotto	3
8	Amets Txurruka (ESP)	Euskaltel–Euskadi	3
9	Mauro Facci (ITA)	Quick-Step–Innergetic	3
10	Igor Antón (ESP)	Euskaltel–Euskadi	1

== Individual 2007 UCI ProTour standings ==
As of 6 May after the Tour de Romandie.

While the top 10 places remained the same, race winner Thomas Dekker scored his first UCI ProTour points and moved into 11th place. Australian sprinter Robbie McEwen gained three points to jump from 18th to 15th place. Paolo Savoldelli moved into 18th place thanks to the 45 points scored at the Tour de Romandie.

Rank	Previous Rank	Name	Nationality	Team	Points
1	1	Davide Rebellin	Italy	Gerolsteiner	157
2	2	Alejandro Valverde	Spain	Caisse d'Epargne	107
3	3	Danilo Di Luca	Italy	Liquigas	100
4	4	Óscar Freire	Spain	Rabobank	82
5	5	Stuart O'Grady	Australia	Team CSC	79
6	6	Stefan Schumacher	Germany	Gerolsteiner	75
7	7	Fränk Schleck	Luxembourg	Team CSC	63
8	8	Juan José Cobo	Spain	Saunier Duval–Prodir	62
9	9	Alberto Contador	Spain	Discovery Channel	58
10	10	Tom Boonen	Belgium	Quick-Step–Innergetic	57
11	–	Thomas Dekker	Netherlands	Rabobank	55
12	11	Andreas Klöden	Germany	Astana	53
13	12	Alessandro Ballan	Italy	Lampre–Fondital	50
14	13	Matthias Kessler	Germany	Astana	50
15	18	Robbie McEwen	Australia	Predictor–Lotto	47

- 93 riders (up from 82 riders) have scored at least one point on the 2007 UCI ProTour.
