= Ralf Männil =

Estonian geologist

Ralf Männil (24 October 1924 Tallinn – 27 September 1990 Tallinn) was an Estonian geologist.

He has described the following taxa:

- bryozoan Sardesonina carinata (Männil, 1958)
- bryozoan Oanduella bassleri Männil, 1958
- echinoderm Bothriocidaris eichwaldi Männil, 1962

His brother was Estonian entrepreneur Harry Männil.
