= ACO, C.A. =

Venezuelan holding company predominantly active in the automotive industry

ACO, C.A. is a Venezuelan holding company for an umbrella organization of over eighty companies engaged in a wide variety of industries throughout Venezuela predominantly in the automotive industry. It is best known for the sale, servicing and leasing of automobiles nationally.

== History ==
ACO was founded in 1951 by Arnold Orav, Chairman along with Harry Männil, President & CEO, and with the financial backing of Alcoa Aluminum Corp. (majority shareholder), the Juan Simon Mendoza family (Polar Group), the Tamayo family (largest Venezuelan liquor distributor et al.), and other prominent Venezuelan investors. The company emerged in the 1970s as the world's largest tractor dealership as the dealer for John Deere Tractors in Venezuela. It also became the largest automobile dealership in South America, according to the Ford Motors Company (USA).

A significant contributor to the success of the Grupo Aco was the innovative introduction in Venezuela of in-house auto sale financing using a captive finance company. Whereas Grupo Aco had equity stakes in a great number of companies, the balance of ownership of many of these companies was held by Grupo Aco shareholders. As a result, Grupo Aco commanded a larger market share than would be suggested only by its totally owned companies. It attained US $900 million in sales during 1973 and ranked as the most profitable private sector company in the nation that year. Changes in Venezuela's economy and political environment during the early 1980s caused a downturn for many large businesses in Venezuela.

In the case of the Aco Group, a financial crisis emerged as motor vehicle sales plummeted. By 1993, the Aco Group was forced into reorganization and a restructuring of the entire group. This led to Harry Mannil becoming the largest shareholder, at 24% of common shares. Efforts to recover financially were overwhelmed by continuous declines in the nation's private sector economy. Aco, S.A. was splintered into several groups, with a substantial number of auto dealerships taken under direct ownership by Harry Mannil.

== Bibliography ==
- Coronil, Fernando (1997). The magical state: nature, money, and modernity in Venezuela. University of Chicago Press. ISBN 978-0-226-11602-0.
