= Harry Männil =

Estonian businessman (1920–2010)

- Männil at the opening of KUMU art museum in February 2006.
- Born: May 17, 1920; Tallinn, Estonia
- Died: January 11, 2010 (aged 89); San José, Costa Rica
- Resting place: Costa Rica
- Citizenship: Estonian, Venezuelan
- Occupation: Businessman
- Known for: Entrepreneurship, art collecting
- Spouse: Masula D'Empaire
- Children: 4

Harry Männil (May 17, 1920 – January 11, 2010), also known as Harry Mannil Laul,^{[a]} was an Estonian businessman, art collector, and cultural benefactor in several countries.

Männil was born in Tallinn, Estonia. As a result of World War II he moved to Venezuela in 1946, where he lived for the rest of his life. He was a successful businessman and part owner of ACO Group, a large Venezuelan conglomerate. He formed his own company Grupo Oriand in 1994. At the time of the restoration of Estonian independence, Männil got involved in Estonian matters, actively interacting with politicians Vaino Väljas and Edgar Savisaar, and acting as an advisor during the latter's prime minister term.

Harry Männil was an active art collector and philanthropist, especially noted for his collection of pre-Columbian art. His art related activities included serving as director of Caracas Athenaeum in Venezuela, and as advisor for the Museum of Modern Art in New York. He also founded Eduard Wiiralt Gallery in Estonian National Library.

Männil was on the Simon Wiesenthal Center's list of most wanted Nazi war criminals, accused by them of having participated in the murder of Jews while he worked for the Political Police (PolPol) in 1941–1942 during the German occupation of Estonia. After a four-year probe, Estonian investigators could find no evidence against him and he was cleared of the charges.

== Biography ==
=== Early life (1920–1946) ===
Harry Männil was born into an iron salesman's family on May 17, 1920, in Tallinn, Estonia, and spent his childhood in Pääsküla, Tallinn. He graduated from the Gustav Adolf Grammar School in 1938 and from 1939–40, studied economics at the University of Tartu and the Tallinn University of Technology. Under the Soviet occupation, during the spring and summer of 1941, he managed nationalised real estate in the employ of the Tallinn housing administration. In the wake of the Nazi aggression, he hid with Miriam Lepp (a Jewish woman who was later executed under the Nazi occupation in July 1942), to escape mobilization into the Red Army, returning to Tallinn soon after its capture by the Nazis and Estonian forces on 28 August 1941. Männil joined the Political Police of the Estonian Self-Administration as an assistant by 4 September 1941. Männil was the immediate subordinate of Evald Mikson and, according to Efraim Zuroff, was promoted to senior assistant after a few months. He held the position until June 10, 1942, when he was fired for unknown reasons. This period of collaboration with the Nazi government would later lead to Männil being accused of war crimes. After being relieved, Männil continued his studies at the University of Tartu.

In October 1943, he moved to Helsinki in Finland; he later claimed that the German Security Service had begun to consider him politically dangerous as a student leader at the university. In Helsinki, he studied business management. He was accused by a local police official of illegal trade in gold and valuables brought to Finland by Estonian refugees. These claims were, however, denied by Männil.

Männil moved to Sweden in September 1944, with the intention of continuing his studies. He stayed at a refugee camp for a short while. Soon he received a residence permit to live in Stockholm and a working permit that allowed him to take a job at an archive. In November 1944, a complaint regarding Männil's Nazi involvement was filed at the Swedish Commission of Foreigners, and he was investigated by the Sandler Commission. The relative ease with which Männil received his work and residence permits raised the suspicions of the local authorities. In September 1945, he was fired from his job at the request of the Commission of Foreigners. A month later, an extension to his residence permit was declined. Männil was allowed to stay in Stockholm to make preparations for his emigration to Venezuela, and an extension was granted on his residence permit a short while later. After Männil was denied a transit visa to Britain, the Swedish authorities pressured him to leave the country.

=== In Venezuela (1946–2010) ===
When Männil arrived in Maracaibo, Venezuela, in February 1946, he described himself as "penniless". He had traveled there under an employment contract to work for the enterprise headed by Juan Mendiri in Maracaibo and which later became part of BECO. He joined Beco, a department store founded in 1942 and owned by Blohms, a family of German descent. Beco was bought out by a group of investors headed by Arnold Orav together with Juan Simon Mendoza (co-founder of Venezuela's largest business empire, the Polar Group), and a couple of other Estonians, who, like Männil, were members of the Vironia academic corporation. Arnold Carl Orav, Chmn, split from BECO in 1951 to form ACO Group, a company that would eventually control over one-sixth of Venezuela's automotive trade. Männil received Venezuelan citizenship in 1952. Männil assumed the title of chairman, in addition to CEO of the ACO Group. It emerged in the 1970s as the world's largest tractor dealership as the dealer for John Deere Tractors in Venezuela. It also became the largest automobile dealership in South America, according to the Ford Motor Company (USA). A significant contributor to the success of the Aco Group was the innovative introduction in Venezuela of in-house auto sale financing using a captive finance company. In 1983, the Aco Group was ranked as the fifth-largest private-sector company in Venezuela [El Universal]. A progressive downturn in Venezuela's economy, which had a particularly adverse on Aco's capital-intensive businesses, resulted in a reorganization in 1994 under new leadership. Mannil was voted out as CEO so he left ACO and formed Oriand, with a portion of the auto dealerships that had been part of Aco. At that time he had been the fourth-largest shareholder, owning 20% of the company. Männil continued to own Oriand Grupo Oriand, until his death.

Männil was member of AEI World Forum, founded by president Gerald Ford whom Männil personally knew.

In 1990, Männil visited Estonia for the first time since 1943 at the invitation of Vaino Väljas, whom he had met when Väljas was the Soviet ambassador to Venezuela. At the time of the restoration of Estonian independence (1990–1992), during the governments of Edgar Savisaar and Tiit Vähi, Männil was the president of the Prime Minister's Economy Friends Club. The club consisted of Estonian businessmen living abroad who gave economic advice and helped to explain Estonia's situation to Western nations. Männil was a godfather of Savisaar's daughter.

Near the end of 2002, Männil was forced to temporarily relocate to Costa Rica due to the Venezuelan general strike. Männil's sons succeeded him when he retired from active business dealings in 2003. Harry Männil died on January 11, 2010, in San José, Costa Rica. His ashes were placed in a chapel on his ranch located in the mountains of Costa Rica.

== Art collecting and work as a cultural benefactor ==
Männil was known as an art collector and cultural benefactor in several countries. His interest in art collecting first arose when he came into the possession of some works by Eduard Wiiralt during World War II. Männil started collecting pre-Columbian art in 1957, and eventually owned the largest private collection in Venezuela. His collection was regarded as among the 200 most important private collections by ARTnews magazine in 1997. Männil classified his art collection into three main groups: pre-Columbian art, modern Latin American art, and art of the South American Indigenous people. He also possessed a few items of 17th–18th century colonial art. Männil, together with his wife, promoted the commercial production and marketing of the textile works of the Guajiro Indians. These two interests led to conflicts with local anthropologists, who criticized their relationship with the Guajiro people and their means of building their archaeological collection.

On July 22, 2010, after Harry Männil's death, Costa Rican authorities raided his house in Heredia and seized 108 pieces of pre-Columbian art, including fourteen large stone spheres. The family had been given two deadlines to hand over the objects voluntarily, and since that did not happen, a raid was conducted. Officials stated that the pieces had been obtained through an illegal purchase which had broken a law against trafficking in archaeological artifacts. The objects were taken to the Museo Nacional de Costa Rica in San José.

Harry Männil was the founder and first director of the West Venezuela Water Sport Federation, and had been the director of Caracas Athenaeum in Caracas and the Maracaibo Art Center. He was a member of the International Council of the Museum of Modern Art in New York. Männil, together with Henry Radeval, contributed to the establishment of the Estonian National Library's Eduard Wiiralt gallery and founded the Eduard Wiiralt Art Award in 1998.

Estonian writer Olev Remsu has published a biography of Harry Männil titled Elitaarne mees (Tänapäev 2011).

== Accusations of war crimes ==
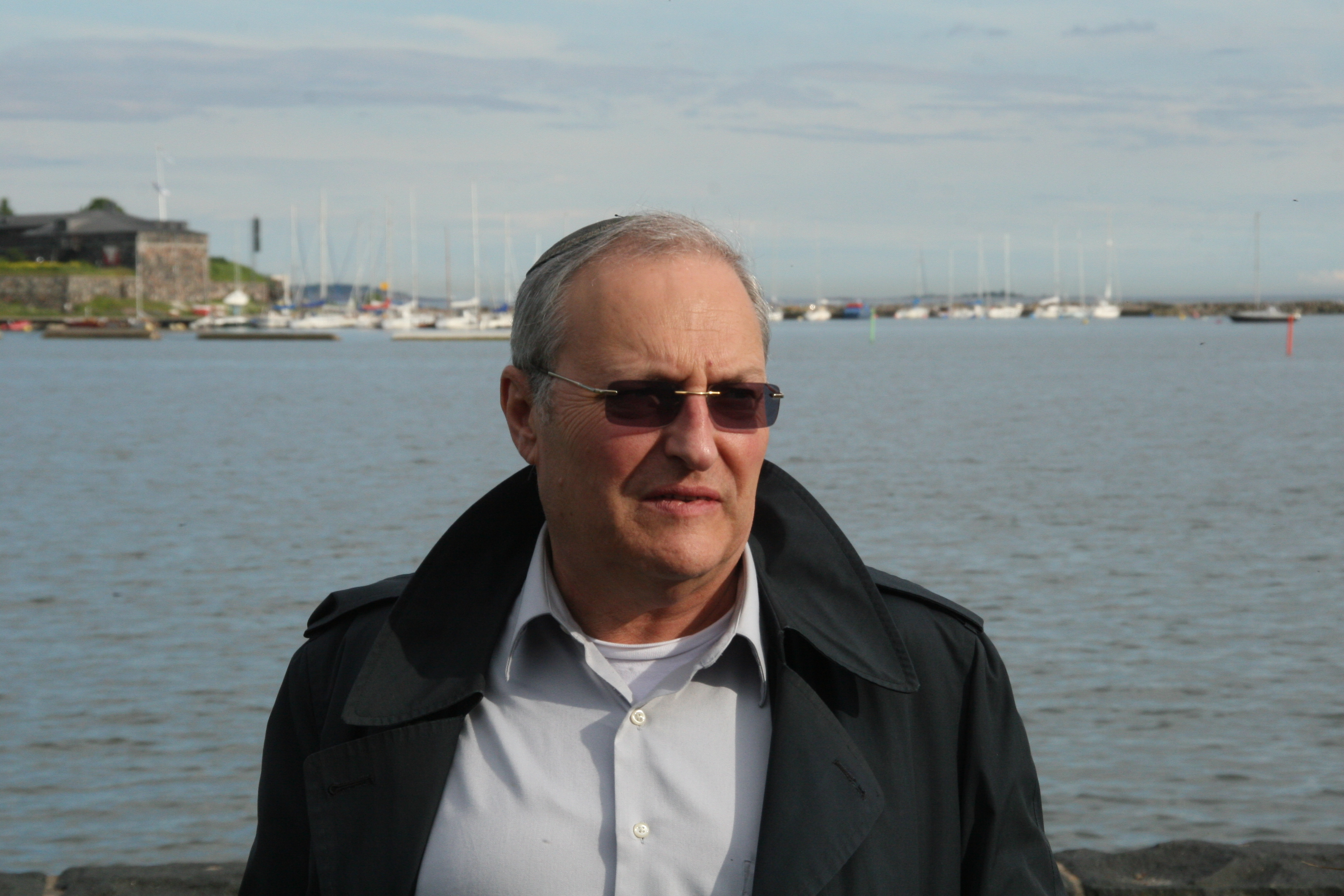
Efraim Zuroff, the director of the Simon Wiesenthal Center, has been the most vocal accuser of Harry Männil. However he admitted after Männil's death that he was unable to prove or corroborate any allegations against Männil.

Männil was accused of committing war crimes against Jews during the Second World War while working for three months in the Nazi-organized Estonian political police in Tallinn in 1941. The Simon Wiesenthal Center claimed that he participated in the persecution and murder of civilians, allegedly murdering 100 Jews personally and rounding up thousands of others. Männil appeared on the Wiesenthal Center's "Top 10 Most Wanted" list. Testimony of how Männil interrogated Jews and communists and allegedly handed victims over to the Nazis to be executed was heard by Sweden's Sandler Commission in the 1940s. He was expelled from Sweden and denied entry to Britain.

In November 1989, the Simon Wiesenthal Center asked the Estonian SSR's public prosecutor's office for any information regarding Männil, who they suspected of being a Nazi war criminal. In April 1990, Rein Sillar, the chief of Estonian SSR's KGB, replied that there was no evidence about Männil, and all possibilities for obtaining such evidence had been exhausted. In December 1993, Efraim Zuroff, the director of the Simon Wiesenthal Center, mailed a letter of complaint to Lennart Meri, the President of Estonia. He asked for Harry Männil to be removed from his position on the council of Baltic Institute for Strategic and International Studies. In reaction, Henry Kissinger – not wanting to be on the same council with a suspected war criminal – left the council in January 1994. Following a hearing by the United States government in the same year, Männil's United States visa was revoked. In January 1994, Männil wrote to the council's executive director: "These accusations are completely groundless and untrue," he said. "I will turn to the judicial authorities of the Estonian Republic for an official investigation based on these accusations." In 1995, Estonian investigators combed their files for evidence implicating Männil, but found none. Jüri Pihl, the director general of Kaitsepolitsei (Estonian Security Police), commented on Männil's case: "Harry Männil has no connections to any war crimes committed in Estonia during the Second World War; there was nothing criminal in his actions."

In 2001, the Estonian International Commission for Investigation of Crimes Against Humanity announced that they found no evidence which would indicate Männil had participated in war crimes. However, the investigators discovered that seven Jews Männil interrogated were later executed. In March 2001, Kaitsepolitsei started investigating Männil's wartime activities at Efraim Zuroff's request. In August 2001, Eesti Ekspress, the largest Estonian weekly, published a caricature depicting Zuroff as a devil receiving Männil's blood into a cup (with the caption "Unwanted guest"), after Zuroff presented his case against Männil to the Estonian Prime Minister Mart Laar. After a nearly five-year-long investigation, Kaitsepolitsei concluded that there was no evidence that Männil had participated in war crimes. The state prosecutor, Margus Kurm, said that there are no documents or witnesses to prove Männil had participated in executions, arrests, or repressions. Regarding those individuals whom Männil had interrogated, Kurm said that there is no evidence that Männil was aware of the detainees being destined for repression or execution. Several aspects support the view that Männil was unaware of such possibilities: The interrogations in question took place on September 4 and 5, at which time the Wehrmacht had been in Tallinn for only six days.

Zuroff criticized the investigations as "a pathetic whitewash for political reasons of an active Nazi collaborator" and cited the prosecutor's contention that Männil was purposely targeted by the Wiesenthal Center as the best proof that Estonia lacks the political will to prosecute a prominent Estonian. Martin Arpo, superintendent of Security Police Board disagrees with this view: "But the local KGB couldn't find any more evidence against the Nazi collaborators. We haven't found it either. And the KGB was a much larger organization than we are and had powers and methods, shall we say, that are not available to a Western democratic country." The Russian Prosecution's Office and FSB have indicated they have no evidence regarding Männil. After Männil's death, Efraim Zuroff, while not withdrawing the accusations, admitted that they were "never able to prove that Männil personally committed murder." More clearly stated, they were never able to prove anything because they had no evidence.

Harry Männil, after temporarily moving to Costa Rica due to the Venezuelan general strike, was denied entry to Costa Rica by the country's immigration director Marco Badilla on February 4, 2003, on the basis of information received from the United States Department of Justice and the Simon Wiesenthal Center. On November 7, Badilla rescinded the order, citing the lack of evidence found in the Estonian investigations and Männil's age as the reasons. Männil was allowed to re-enter the country. In relation for Männil being barred from the United States, the US ambassador in Estonia, Aldona Wos, refused to attend the opening of the KUMU art museum in February 2006. Männil was among the invitees.

== Honors ==
From 1968 until his death, Männil was a Knight of Malta. He was an honorary citizen of the city of Thibodaux, Louisiana. The Venezuelan government awarded him the Order of the Star of Carabobo and the Order of Francisco de Miranda. He received the Order of the Polar Star from the King of Sweden.

== Personal life ==
Harry Männil was a brother of geologist Ralf Männil. He married Masula D'Empaire, a granddaughter of commercial tycoon and banker Samuel Belloso, in 1955; they had four children. The Belloso are a prominent family of recent Jewish heritage dating back as commercial traders and bankers in Curaçao. Many of the family members converted to become Catholics while others retained their Jewish faith to the present.

Männil's primary country of residence was Venezuela, where he lived in Caracas, but he also owned a ranch in Costa Rica, a farm in the Llanos of Venezuela, and apartments in Paris and New York.

== Notes ==
a. Männil appears to have used his mother's last name, "Laul", as a second last name in accordance with the practice in Latin America.
