= Danniel Librelon =

Brazilian politician (born 1983)

Member of the Legislative Assembly of Rio de Janeiro
- Incumbent
- Assumed office 1 February 2019

Personal details
- Born: 17 May 1983 (age 43)
- Party: Republicans (since 2007)

Danniel Librelon Dias de Castro (born 17 May 1983) is a Brazilian politician serving as a member of the Legislative Assembly of Rio de Janeiro since 2019. In 2023, he served as group leader of the Republicans.
