= Patrick Calcagni =

Road bicycle racer

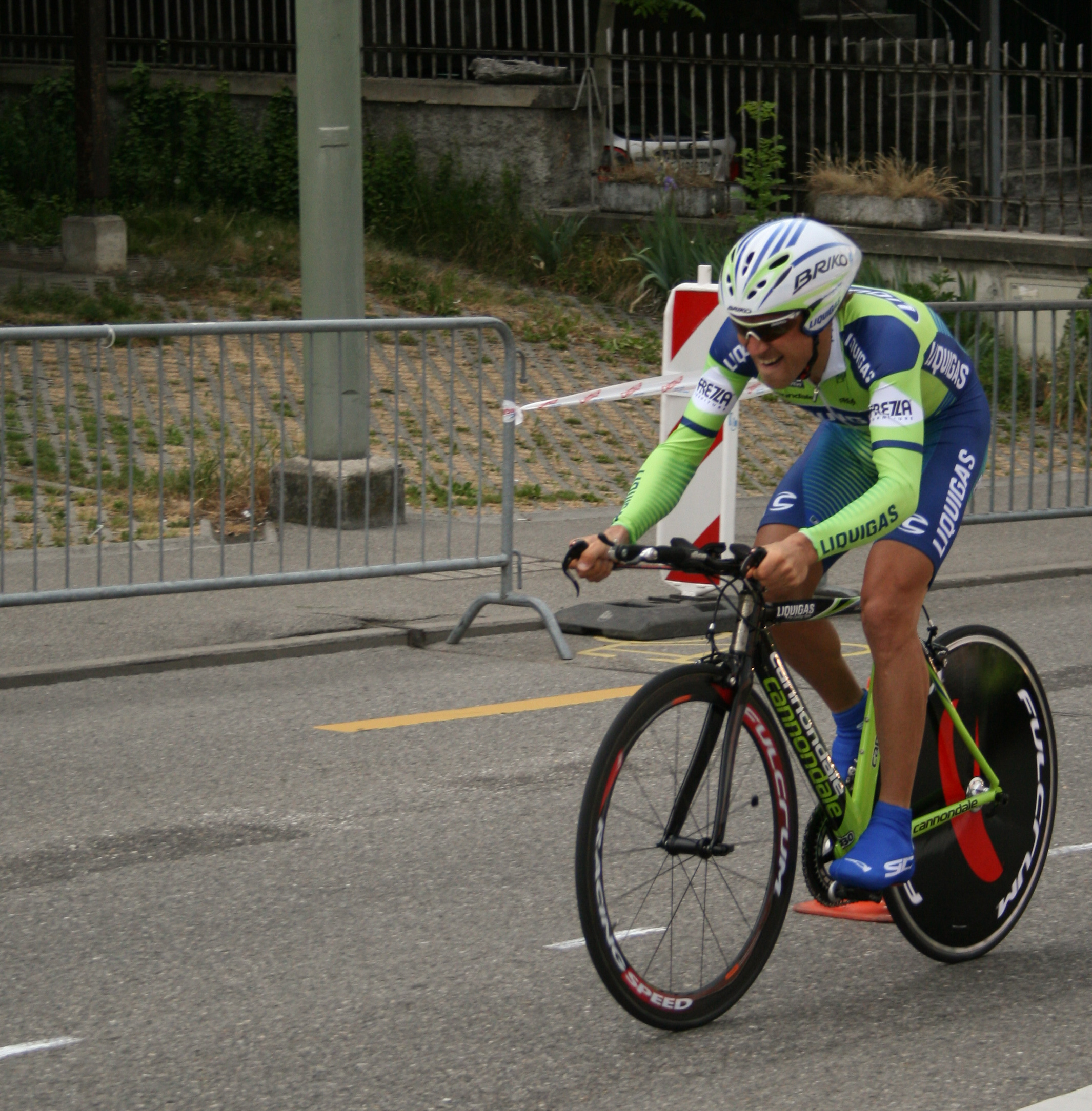

Personal information
- Full name: Patrick Calcagni
- Born: 5 July 1977 (age 49) Sorengo, Switzerland
- Height: 1.74 m (5 ft 9 in)
- Weight: 68 kg (150 lb)

Cycling career
- Sport: Cycling
- Current team: Retired
- Discipline: Road
- Role: Rider

Professional teams
- 2000–2004: Vini Caldirola–Sidermec
- 2005–2007: Liquigas–Bianchi
- 2008–2009: Barloworld

Major wins
- One-day races and Classics National Time Trial Championships (2000)

Patrick Calcagni (born 5 July 1977) is a Swiss former professional road bicycle racer.

== Major results ==
1994
National Junior Road Championships

1st Time trial
3rd Road race

3rd Overall Grand Prix Rüebliland
1995
National Junior Road Championships

1st Road race
2nd Time trial

1997
1st Road race, National Under-23 Road Championships
1998
6th Time trial, European Under-23 Road Championships
1999
5th Road race, UCI Under-23 Road World Championships
2000
1st Time trial, National Road Championships
2nd Giro del Mendrisiotto
8th Gran Premio Bruno Beghelli
2001
1st Stage 3 Tour of Japan
2002
10th Tour de Berne
2004
2nd Overall Tour du Limousin

1st Points classification

7th GP Ouest-France
10th Giro del Piemonte
2005
9th GP Costa degli Etruschi
2007
1st Sprints classification, Tour de Romandie
9th GP Chiasso
2008
1st Grand Prix Pino Cerami
6th Monte Paschi Eroica
2009
10th Giro del Friuli

=== Grand Tour general classification results timeline ===
Grand Tour	2002	2003	2004	2005	2006	2007	2008
Giro d'Italia	—	—	—	DNF	107	—	DNF
Tour de France	—	—	—	—	129	—	—
Vuelta a España	103	128	65	41	—	92	—

Legend
—	Did not compete
DNF	Did not finish
