= Beñat Albizuri =

Spanish cyclist

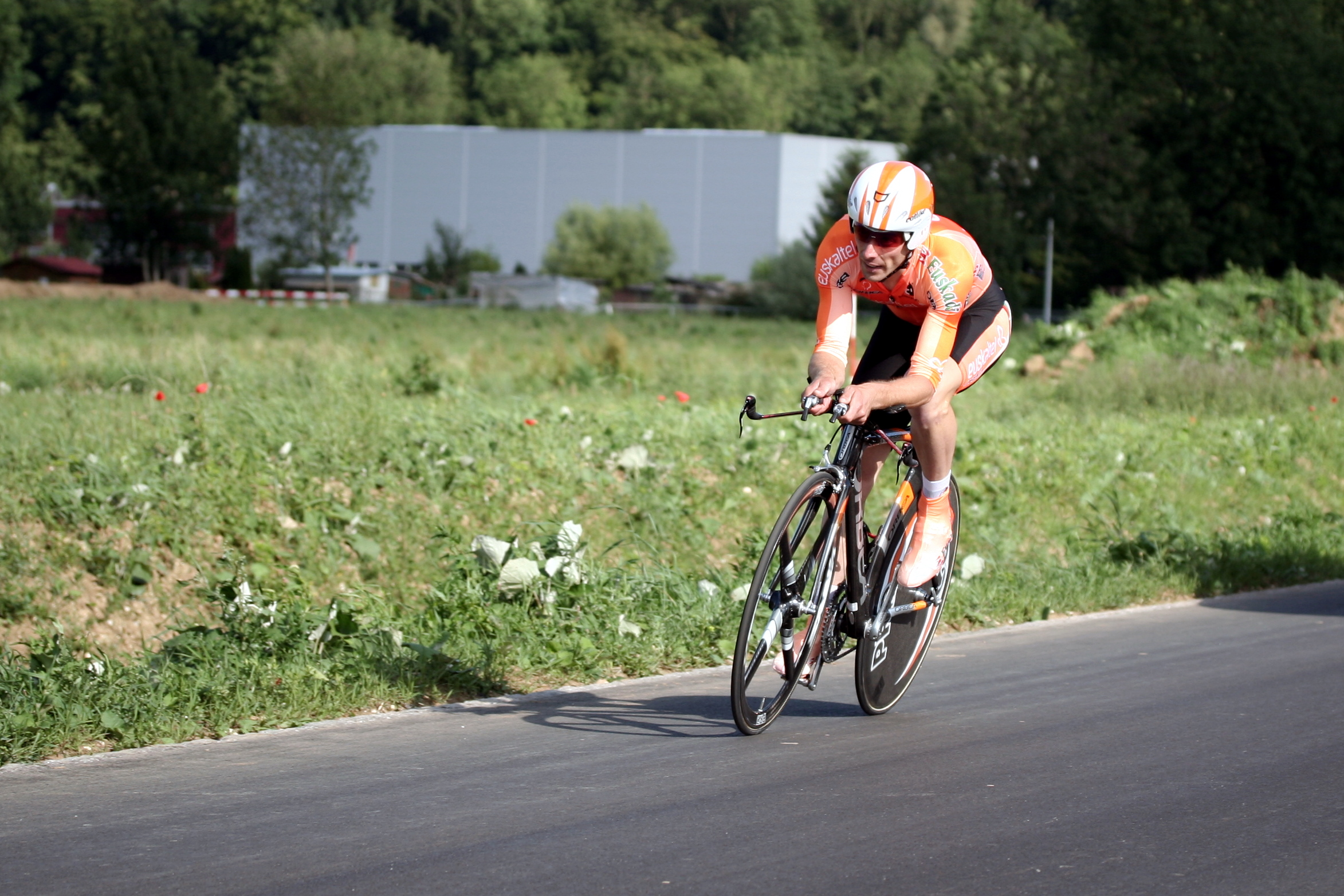
- Albizuri at the 2007 Tour de Suisse

Personal information
- Full name: Beñat Albizuri Aransolo
- Born: May 17, 1981 (age 45) Berriz, Spain
- Height: 1.73 m (5 ft 8 in)
- Weight: 69 kg (152 lb)

Cycling career
- Sport: Cycling
- Current team: Retired
- Discipline: Road
- Role: Rider

Amateur teams
- 2005: Orbea
- 2005: Euskaltel–Euskadi (stagiaire)

Professional team
- 2006–2008: Euskaltel–Euskadi

Beñat Albizuri Aransolo (born May 17, 1981 in Berriz, Basque Country) is a Spanish former professional road bicycle racer, who rode professionally between 2006 and 2008, entirely for Euskaltel–Euskadi.

He rode as a stagiaire for Euskaltel–Euskadi in the second half of the 2005 season, where his best result was a second place on a stage of the Vuelta a La Rioja. Albizuri's showings earned him a professional contract at Euskaltel–Euskadi for the 2006 season, but he was released at the end of the 2008 season.
