= Francisco Pérez Sanchez =

Spanish cyclist (born 1978)

Francisco Pérez
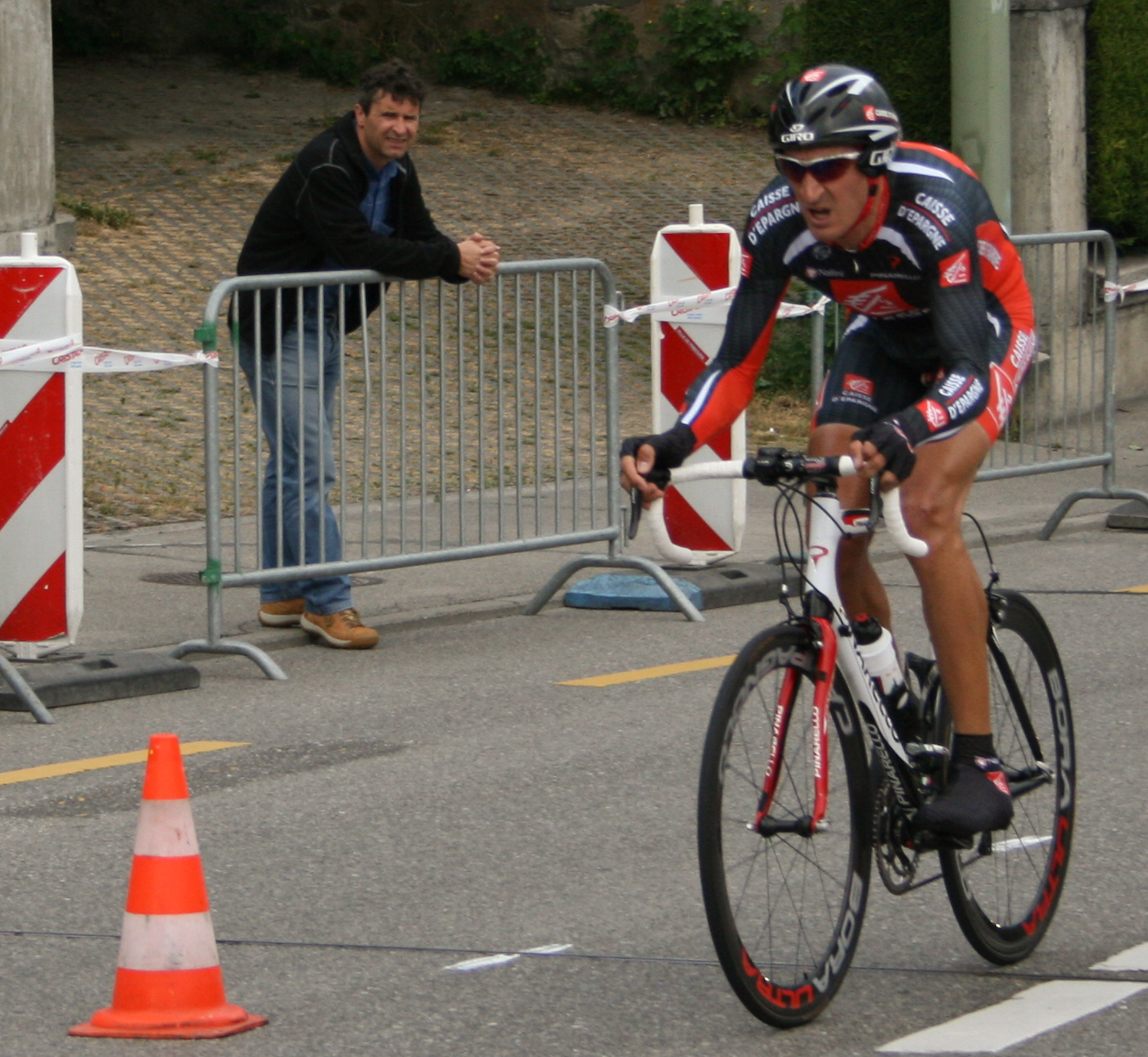
- Pérez during the 2007 Tour de Romandie

Personal information
- Full name: Francisco Pérez Sanchez
- Born: 22 July 1978 (age 48) Murcia, Spain
- Height: 1.89 m (6 ft 2 in)
- Weight: 76 kg (168 lb)

Cycling career
- Sport: Cycling
- Current team: Wild Wolf Trek Pro Racing
- Disciplines: Mountain biking Road (former)
- Role: Rider
- Rider type: Climbing specialist

Professional teams
- 2002: Porta da Ravessa
- 2003–2005: Milaneza Maia
- 2005–2011: Illes Balears–Banesto
- 2012–: Wild Wolf Trek Pro Racing

Major wins
- Clásica de Almería (2006); Tour de Romandie, 2 stages (2003)

Francisco Pérez Sanchez (born 22 July 1978 in Murcia) is a Spanish professional cross-country mountain biker for Wild Wolf Trek Pro Racing, and a former road bicycle racer for several teams including UCI ProTeam Movistar Team. Pérez is a strong climber.

== Major results ==
- 2007 Tour de France – 72nd
- Clásica de Almería (2006)
- 2006 Giro d'Italia – 28th
  - 2nd, Stage 14
- 2005 Vuelta a España – 52nd
- GP MR Cortez-Mitsubishi – 1 stage & Overall (2003)

== See also ==
- List of doping cases in cycling
