= Theo Eltink =

Dutch cyclist

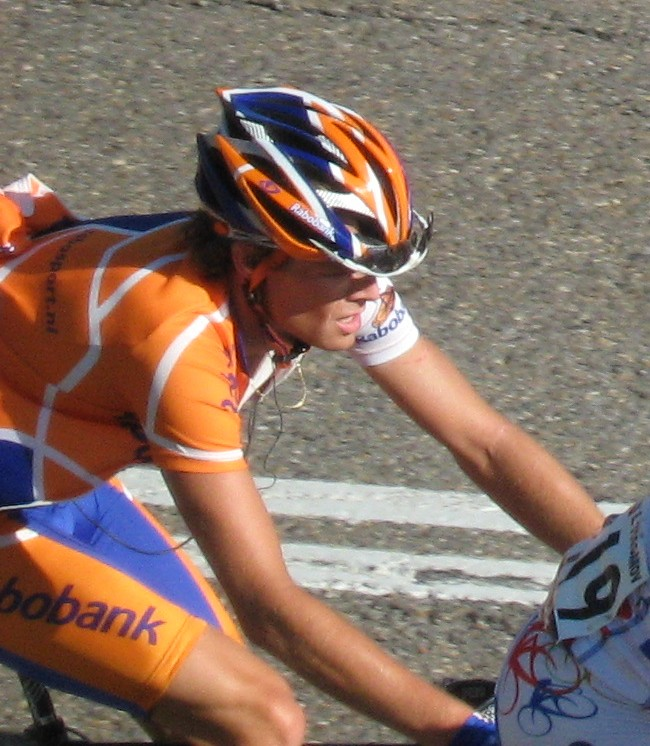

Personal information
- Full name: Theo Eltink
- Born: 27 November 1981 (age 44) Eindhoven, the Netherlands
- Height: 1.73 m (5 ft 8 in)
- Weight: 55.5 kg (122 lb)

Cycling career
- Sport: Cycling
- Discipline: Road
- Role: Rider

Professional teams
- 2002–2004: Rabobank GS3
- 2005–2008: Rabobank
- 2009: Skil–Shimano

Theo Eltink (born 27 November 1981 in Eindhoven) is a Dutch former professional road bicycle racer.

== Biography ==
In his youth, Eltink also was a good ice skater, but finally chose for cycling. He competed in cyclo-cross and road races at cycling club "Het snelle wiel". After Eltink finished school, he focussed on cycling.

Eltink became a member of the Rabobank TT3, a team for promising young riders. In 2005, Eltink became a professional cyclist for Rabobank. In his first year, Eltink started in the 2005 Giro d'Italia, and finished 29th in the general classification.

== Major results ==
- Tour de l'Avenir - 1 stage (2004)
- Tour des Pyrénées - 1 stage (2004)
- 2nd, National U23 Cyclo-Cross Championship (2003)
- 3rd, National U17 Cyclo-Cross Championship (1997)
