= List of teams and cyclists in the 2005 Tour de France =

The 2005 Tour de France was the 92nd edition of the Tour de France, one of cycling's Grand Tours. It took place between 2–24 July, with 21 stages covering a distance 3,593 km (2,233 mi).

== Teams ==
- Discovery Channel
- T-Mobile Team
- Team CSC
- Illes Balears–Caisse d'Epargne
- Davitamon–Lotto
- Rabobank
- Phonak
- Fassa Bortolo
- Saunier Duval–Prodir
- Liberty Seguros–Würth
- Crédit Agricole
- Liquigas–Bianchi
- Cofidis
- Quick-Step–Innergetic
- Bouygues Télécom
- Lampre–Caffita
- Gerolsteiner
- Française des Jeux
- Domina Vacanze
- Euskaltel–Euskadi
- AG2R Prévoyance

== Cyclists by starting number ==
"DNF" indicates that a rider did not finish the 2005 Tour de France. For when and why, see the list of Retirements/Withdrawals

No.	Name	Nationality	Team	Age	Pos.
1	Lance Armstrong	United States	Discovery Channel	33	1
2	José Azevedo	Portugal	Discovery Channel	31	30
3	Manuel Beltrán	Spain	Discovery Channel	34	DNF
4	George Hincapie	United States	Discovery Channel	32	14
5	Benjamín Noval	Spain	Discovery Channel	26	107
6	Pavel Padrnos	Czech Republic	Discovery Channel	34	95
7	Yaroslav Popovych	Ukraine	Discovery Channel	25	12
8	José Luis Rubiera	Spain	Discovery Channel	32	35
9	Paolo Savoldelli	Italy	Discovery Channel	32	25
11	Jan Ullrich	Germany	T-Mobile Team	31	3
12	Giuseppe Guerini	Italy	T-Mobile Team	35	20
13	Matthias Kessler	Germany	T-Mobile Team	26	57
14	Andreas Klöden	Germany	T-Mobile Team	30	DNF
15	Daniele Nardello	Italy	T-Mobile Team	32	55
16	Stephan Schreck	Germany	T-Mobile Team	27	86
17	Óscar Sevilla	Spain	T-Mobile Team	28	18
18	Tobias Steinhauser	Germany	T-Mobile Team	33	81
19	Alexander Vinokourov	Kazakhstan	T-Mobile Team	31	5
21	Ivan Basso	Italy	Team CSC	27	2
22	Kurt Asle Arvesen	Norway	Team CSC	30	89
23	Bobby Julich	United States	Team CSC	33	17
24	Giovanni Lombardi	Italy	Team CSC	36	118
25	Luke Roberts	Australia	Team CSC	28	102
26	Carlos Sastre	Spain	Team CSC	30	21
27	Nicki Sørensen	Denmark	Team CSC	30	71
28	Jens Voigt	Germany	Team CSC	33	DNF
29	David Zabriskie	United States	Team CSC	26	DNF
31	Francisco Mancebo	Spain	Illes Balears	29	4
32	José Luis Arrieta	Spain	Illes Balears	34	74
33	David Arroyo	Spain	Illes Balears	25	53
34	Daniel Becke	Germany	Illes Balears	27	152
35	Isaac Gálvez	Spain	Illes Balears	30	DNF
36	Vicente García Acosta	Spain	Illes Balears	32	148
37	Vladimir Karpets	Russia	Illes Balears	24	50
38	Alejandro Valverde	Spain	Illes Balears	25	DNF
39	Xabier Zandio	Spain	Illes Balears	28	22
41	Robbie McEwen	Australia	Davitamon–Lotto	33	134
42	Mario Aerts	Belgium	Davitamon–Lotto	30	112
43	Christophe Brandt	Belgium	Davitamon–Lotto	28	56
44	Cadel Evans	Australia	Davitamon–Lotto	28	8
45	Axel Merckx	Belgium	Davitamon–Lotto	32	39
46	Fred Rodriguez	United States	Davitamon–Lotto	31	132
47	Léon van Bon	Netherlands	Davitamon–Lotto	33	DNF
48	Johan Van Summeren	Belgium	Davitamon–Lotto	24	136
49	Wim Vansevenant	Belgium	Davitamon–Lotto	33	154
51	Denis Menchov	Russia	Rabobank	27	85
52	Michael Boogerd	Netherlands	Rabobank	33	24
53	Erik Dekker	Netherlands	Rabobank	34	109
54	Karsten Kroon	Netherlands	Rabobank	29	135
55	Gerben Löwik	Netherlands	Rabobank	28	DNF
56	Joost Posthuma	Netherlands	Rabobank	24	83
57	Michael Rasmussen	Denmark	Rabobank	31	7
58	Marc Wauters	Belgium	Rabobank	36	140
59	Pieter Weening	Netherlands	Rabobank	24	72
61	Santiago Botero	Colombia	Phonak	32	51
62	Bert Grabsch	Germany	Phonak	30	103
63	José Enrique Gutiérrez	Spain	Phonak	27	49
64	Robert Hunter	South Africa	Phonak	28	DNF
65	Nicolas Jalabert	France	Phonak	32	138
66	Floyd Landis	United States	Phonak	29	9
67	Alexandre Moos	Switzerland	Phonak	32	42
68	Óscar Pereiro	Spain	Phonak	27	10
69	Steve Zampieri	Switzerland	Phonak	28	DNF
71	Fabian Cancellara	Switzerland	Fassa Bortolo	24	128
72	Lorenzo Bernucci	Italy	Fassa Bortolo	25	62
73	Claudio Corioni	Italy	Fassa Bortolo	22	DNF
74	Mauro Facci	Italy	Fassa Bortolo	23	144
75	Juan Antonio Flecha	Spain	Fassa Bortolo	27	73
76	Dario Frigo	Italy	Fassa Bortolo	31	DNF
77	Massimo Giunti	Italy	Fassa Bortolo	30	80
78	Volodymyr Hustov	Ukraine	Fassa Bortolo	28	104
79	Kim Kirchen	Luxembourg	Fassa Bortolo	27	DNF
81	Juan Manuel Gárate	Spain	Saunier Duval–Prodir	29	66
82	Rubens Bertogliati	Switzerland	Saunier Duval–Prodir	26	92
83	David Cañada	Spain	Saunier Duval–Prodir	30	63
84	Nicolas Fritsch	France	Saunier Duval–Prodir	26	DNF
85	José Ángel Gómez Marchante	Spain	Saunier Duval–Prodir	25	DNF
86	Christopher Horner	United States	Saunier Duval–Prodir	33	33
87	Leonardo Piepoli	Italy	Saunier Duval–Prodir	33	23
88	Manuel Quinziato	Italy	Saunier Duval–Prodir	25	131
89	Constantino Zaballa	Spain	Saunier Duval–Prodir	27	DNF
91	Roberto Heras	Spain	Liberty Seguros–Würth	31	45
92	Joseba Beloki	Spain	Liberty Seguros–Würth	31	75
93	Alberto Contador	Spain	Liberty Seguros–Würth	22	31
94	Allan Davis	Australia	Liberty Seguros–Würth	24	84
95	Igor González de Galdeano	Spain	Liberty Seguros–Würth	31	DNF
96	Jörg Jaksche	Germany	Liberty Seguros–Würth	28	16
97	Luis León Sánchez	Spain	Liberty Seguros–Würth	21	108
98	Marcos Serrano	Spain	Liberty Seguros–Würth	32	40
99	Ángel Vicioso	Spain	Liberty Seguros–Würth	28	64
101	Christophe Moreau	France	Crédit Agricole	34	11
102	László Bodrogi	Hungary	Crédit Agricole	28	119
103	Pietro Caucchioli	Italy	Crédit Agricole	29	36
104	Patrice Halgand	France	Crédit Agricole	31	52
105	Sébastien Hinault	France	Crédit Agricole	31	115
106	Thor Hushovd	Norway	Crédit Agricole	27	116
107	Sébastien Joly	France	Crédit Agricole	26	106
108	Andrey Kashechkin	Kazakhstan	Crédit Agricole	25	19
109	Jaan Kirsipuu	Estonia	Crédit Agricole	36	DNF
111	Stefano Garzelli	Italy	Liquigas–Bianchi	32	32
112	Michael Albasini	Switzerland	Liquigas–Bianchi	24	145
113	Magnus Bäckstedt	Sweden	Liquigas–Bianchi	30	DNF
114	Kjell Carlström	Finland	Liquigas–Bianchi	28	141
115	Dario Cioni	Italy	Liquigas–Bianchi	30	54
116	Mauro Gerosa	Italy	Liquigas–Bianchi	30	137
117	Marcus Ljungqvist	Sweden	Liquigas–Bianchi	30	125
118	Luciano Pagliarini	Brazil	Liquigas–Bianchi	27	DNF
119	Franco Pellizotti	Italy	Liquigas–Bianchi	27	47
121	Stuart O'Grady	Australia	Cofidis	31	77
122	Stéphane Augé	France	Cofidis	30	121
123	Frédéric Bessy	France	Cofidis	33	129
124	Sylvain Chavanel	France	Cofidis	26	58
125	Thierry Marichal	Belgium	Cofidis	32	127
126	David Moncoutié	France	Cofidis	30	67
127	Janek Tombak	Estonia	Cofidis	29	153
128	Cédric Vasseur	France	Cofidis	34	44
129	Matt White	Australia	Cofidis	31	123
131	Tom Boonen	Belgium	Quick-Step	24	DNF
132	Wilfried Cretskens	Belgium	Quick-Step	29	DNF
133	Kevin Hulsmans	Belgium	Quick-Step	27	DNF
134	Servais Knaven	Netherlands	Quick-Step	34	149
135	Michael Rogers	Australia	Quick-Step	25	41
136	Patrik Sinkewitz	Germany	Quick-Step	24	59
137	Bram Tankink	Netherlands	Quick-Step	26	111
138	Guido Trentin	United States	Quick-Step	32	139
139	Stefano Zanini	Italy	Quick-Step	36	DNF
141	Didier Rous	France	Bouygues Télécom	34	82
142	Walter Bénéteau	France	Bouygues Télécom	32	68
143	Laurent Brochard	France	Bouygues Télécom	37	28
144	Pierrick Fédrigo	France	Bouygues Télécom	26	46
145	Anthony Geslin	France	Bouygues Télécom	25	97
146	Laurent Lefèvre	France	Bouygues Télécom	29	117
147	Jérôme Pineau	France	Bouygues Télécom	25	43
148	Matthieu Sprick	France	Bouygues Télécom	23	120
149	Thomas Voeckler	France	Bouygues Télécom	26	124
151	Eddy Mazzoleni	Italy	Lampre–Caffita	31	13
152	Gianluca Bortolami	Italy	Lampre–Caffita	36	DNF
153	Salvatore Commesso	Italy	Lampre–Caffita	30	101
154	Gerrit Glomser	Austria	Lampre–Caffita	30	DNF
155	David Loosli	Switzerland	Lampre–Caffita	25	99
156	Evgeni Petrov	Russia	Lampre–Caffita	27	DNF
157	Daniele Righi	Italy	Lampre–Caffita	29	110
158	Alessandro Spezialetti	Italy	Lampre–Caffita	30	DNF
159	Gorazd Štangelj	Slovenia	Lampre–Caffita	32	87
161	Georg Totschnig	Austria	Team Gerolsteiner	34	26
162	Robert Förster	Germany	Team Gerolsteiner	27	151
163	Sebastian Lang	Germany	Team Gerolsteiner	25	65
164	Levi Leipheimer	United States	Team Gerolsteiner	31	6
165	Michael Rich	Germany	Team Gerolsteiner	35	130
166	Ronny Scholz	Germany	Team Gerolsteiner	27	91
167	Fabian Wegmann	Germany	Team Gerolsteiner	25	79
168	Peter Wrolich	Austria	Team Gerolsteiner	31	146
169	Beat Zberg	Switzerland	Team Gerolsteiner	34	93
171	Bradley McGee	Australia	Française des Jeux	29	105
172	Sandy Casar	France	Française des Jeux	26	29
173	Baden Cooke	Australia	Française des Jeux	26	142
174	Carlos Da Cruz	Spain	Française des Jeux	30	76
175	Bernhard Eisel	Austria	Française des Jeux	24	143
176	Philippe Gilbert	Belgium	Française des Jeux	23	70
177	Thomas Lövkvist	Sweden	Française des Jeux	21	61
178	Christophe Mengin	France	Française des Jeux	36	DNF
179	Francis Mourey	France	Française des Jeux	24	94
181	Serhiy Honchar	Ukraine	Domina Vacanze	35	DNF
182	Alessandro Bertolini	Italy	Domina Vacanze	33	113
183	Alessandro Cortinovis	Italy	Domina Vacanze	27	98
184	Angelo Furlan	Italy	Domina Vacanze	28	DNF
185	Andriy Hrivko	Ukraine	Domina Vacanze	21	78
186	Maxim Iglinsky	Kazakhstan	Domina Vacanze	24	37
187	Jörg Ludewig	Germany	Domina Vacanze	29	38
188	Rafael Nuritdinov	Uzbekistan	Domina Vacanze	28	147
189	Alessandro Vanotti	Italy	Domina Vacanze	24	133
191	Iban Mayo	Spain	Euskaltel–Euskadi	27	60
192	Iker Camaño	Spain	Euskaltel–Euskadi	26	69
193	Unai Etxebarría	Venezuela	Euskaltel–Euskadi	32	150
194	Íker Flores	Spain	Euskaltel–Euskadi	28	155
195	David Herrero	Spain	Euskaltel–Euskadi	25	DNF
196	Iñaki Isasi	Spain	Euskaltel–Euskadi	28	122
197	Íñigo Landaluze	Spain	Euskaltel–Euskadi	28	100
198	Egoi Martínez	Spain	Euskaltel–Euskadi	27	48
199	Haimar Zubeldia	Spain	Euskaltel–Euskadi	28	15
201	Jean-Patrick Nazon	France	Ag2r	28	DNF
202	Míkel Astarloza	Spain	Ag2r	25	27
203	Sylvain Calzati	France	Ag2r	26	DNF
204	Samuel Dumoulin	France	Ag2r	24	114
205	Simon Gerrans	Australia	Ag2r	25	126
206	Stéphane Goubert	France	Ag2r	35	34
207	Yuriy Krivtsov	Ukraine	Ag2r	26	90
208	Nicolas Portal	France	Ag2r	26	88
209	Ludovic Turpin	France	Ag2r	30	96

== Cyclists by team ==
"DNF" indicates that a rider did not finish the 2005 Tour de France. For when and why, see the list of Retirements/Withdrawals

Discovery Channel DSC
Nr.		Age		Pos.
1	Lance Armstrong	33	USA	1
2	José Azevedo	31	Portugal	30
3	Manuel Beltrán	34	Spain	DNF
4	George Hincapie	32	USA	14
5	Benjamín Noval	26	Spain	107
6	Pavel Padrnos	34	Czech Republic	95
7	Yaroslav Popovych	25	Ukraine	12
8	José Luis Rubiera	32	Spain	35
9	Paolo Savoldelli	32	Italy	25
Team manager: Johan Bruyneel

T-Mobile Team TMO
Nr.		Age		Pos.
11	Jan Ullrich	31	Germany	3
12	Giuseppe Guerini	35	Italy	20
13	Matthias Kessler	26	Germany	57
14	Andreas Klöden	30	Germany	DNF
15	Daniele Nardello	32	Italy	55
16	Stephan Schreck	27	Germany	86
17	Óscar Sevilla	28	Spain	18
18	Tobias Steinhauser	33	Germany	81
19	Alexander Vinokourov	31	Kazakhstan	5
Team manager: Mario Kummer

Team CSC CSC
Nr.		Age		Pos.
21	Ivan Basso	27	Italy	2
22	Kurt Asle Arvesen	30	Norway	89
23	Bobby Julich	33	USA	17
24	Giovanni Lombardi	36	Italy	118
25	Luke Roberts	28	Australia	102
26	Carlos Sastre	30	Spain	21
27	Nicki Sørensen	30	Denmark	71
28	Jens Voigt	33	Germany	DNF
29	David Zabriskie	26	USA	DNF
Team manager: Bjarne Riis

Illes Balears IBA
Nr.		Age		Pos.
31	Francisco Mancebo	29	Spain	4
32	José Luis Arrieta	34	Spain	74
33	David Arroyo	25	Spain	53
34	Daniel Becke	27	Germany	152
35	Isaac Gálvez	30	Spain	DNF
36	Vicente García Acosta	32	Spain	148
37	Vladimir Karpets	24	Russia	50
38	Alejandro Valverde	25	Spain	DNF
39	Xabier Zandio	28	Spain	22
Team manager: Eusebio Unzué

Davitamon–Lotto DVL
Nr.		Age		Pos.
41	Robbie McEwen	33	Australia	134
42	Mario Aerts	30	Belgium	112
43	Christophe Brandt	28	Belgium	56
44	Cadel Evans	28	Australia	8
45	Axel Merckx	32	Belgium	39
46	Fred Rodriguez	31	USA	132
47	Léon van Bon	33	Netherlands	DNF
48	Johan Van Summeren	24	Belgium	136
49	Wim Vansevenant	33	Belgium	154
Team manager: Marc Sergeant

Rabobank RAB
Nr.		Age		Pos.
51	Denis Menchov	27	Russia	85
52	Michael Boogerd	33	Netherlands	24
53	Erik Dekker	34	Netherlands	109
54	Karsten Kroon	29	Netherlands	135
55	Gerben Löwik	28	Netherlands	DNF
56	Joost Posthuma	24	Netherlands	83
57	Michael Rasmussen	31	Denmark	7
58	Marc Wauters	36	Belgium	140
59	Pieter Weening	24	Netherlands	72
Team managers: Erik Breukink, Frank Maassen

Phonak PHO
Nr.		Age		Pos.
61	Santiago Botero	32	Colombia	51
62	Bert Grabsch	30	Germany	103
63	José Enrique Gutiérrez	27	Spain	49
64	Robert Hunter	28	South Africa	DNF
65	Nicolas Jalabert	32	France	138
66	Floyd Landis	29	USA	9
67	Alexandre Moos	32	Switzerland	42
68	Óscar Pereiro	27	Spain	10
69	Steve Zampieri	28	Switzerland	DNF
Team manager: Álvaro Pino

Fassa Bortolo FAS
Nr.		Age		Pos.
71	Fabian Cancellara	24	Switzerland	128
72	Lorenzo Bernucci	25	Italy	62
73	Claudio Corioni	22	Italy	DNF
74	Mauro Facci	23	Italy	144
75	Juan Antonio Flecha	27	Spain	73
76	Dario Frigo	31	Italy	DNF
77	Massimo Giunti	30	Italy	80
78	Volodymyr Hustov	28	Ukraine	104
79	Kim Kirchen	27	Luxembourg	DNF
Team manager: Giancarlo Ferretti

Saunier Duval–Prodir SDV
Nr.		Age		Pos.
81	Juan Manuel Gárate	29	Spain	66
82	Rubens Bertogliati	26	Switzerland	92
83	David Cañada	30	Spain	63
84	Nicolas Fritsch	26	France	DNF
85	José Ángel Gómez Marchante	25	Spain	DNF
86	Christopher Horner	33	USA	33
87	Leonardo Piepoli	33	Italy	23
88	Manuel Quinziato	25	Italy	131
89	Constantino Zaballa	27	Spain	DNF
Team manager: Matxin

Liberty Seguros–Würth LSW
Nr.		Age		Pos.
91	Roberto Heras	31	Spain	45
92	Joseba Beloki	31	Spain	75
93	Alberto Contador	22	Spain	31
94	Allan Davis	24	Australia	84
95	Igor González de Galdeano	31	Spain	DNF
96	Jörg Jaksche	28	Germany	16
97	Luis León Sánchez	21	Spain	108
98	Marcos Serrano	32	Spain	40
99	Ángel Vicioso	28	Spain	64
Team manager: Manolo Sáiz

Crédit Agricole C.A.
Nr.		Age		Pos.
101	Christophe Moreau	34	France	11
102	László Bodrogi	28	Hungary	119
103	Pietro Caucchioli	29	Italy	36
104	Patrice Halgand	31	France	52
105	Sébastien Hinault	31	France	115
106	Thor Hushovd	27	Norway	116
107	Sébastien Joly	26	France	106
108	Andrey Kashechkin	25	Kazakhstan	19
109	Jaan Kirsipuu	36	Estonia	DNF
Team manager: Roger Legeay

Liquigas–Bianchi LIQ
Nr.		Age		Pos.
111	Stefano Garzelli	32	Italy	32
112	Michael Albasini	24	Switzerland	145
113	Magnus Bäckstedt	30	Sweden	DNF
114	Kjell Carlström	28	Finland	141
115	Dario Cioni	30	Italy	54
116	Mauro Gerosa	30	Italy	137
117	Marcus Ljungqvist	30	Sweden	125
118	Luciano Pagliarini	27	Brazil	DNF
119	Franco Pellizotti	27	Italy	47
Team manager: Stefano Zanatta

Cofidis COF
Nr.		Age		Pos.
121	Stuart O'Grady	31	Australia	77
122	Stéphane Augé	30	France	121
123	Frédéric Bessy	33	France	129
124	Sylvain Chavanel	26	France	58
125	Thierry Marichal	32	Belgium	127
126	David Moncoutié	30	France	67
127	Janek Tombak	29	Estonia	153
128	Cédric Vasseur	34	France	44
129	Matt White	31	Australia	123
Team manager: Francis van Londersele

Quick-Step QST
Nr.		Age		Pos.
131	Tom Boonen	24	Belgium	DNF
132	Wilfried Cretskens	29	Belgium	DNF
133	Kevin Hulsmans	27	Belgium	DNF
134	Servais Knaven	34	Netherlands	149
135	Michael Rogers	25	Australia	41
136	Patrik Sinkewitz	24	Germany	59
137	Bram Tankink	26	Netherlands	111
138	Guido Trentin	32	USA	139
139	Stefano Zanini	36	Italy	DNF
Team manager: Patrick Lefevere

Bouygues Télécom BLT
Nr.		Age		Pos.
141	Didier Rous	34	France	82
142	Walter Bénéteau	32	France	68
143	Laurent Brochard	37	France	28
144	Pierrick Fédrigo	26	France	46
145	Anthony Geslin	25	France	97
146	Laurent Lefèvre	29	France	117
147	Jérôme Pineau	25	France	43
148	Matthieu Sprick	23	France	120
149	Thomas Voeckler	26	France	124
Team manager: Dominique Arnould

Lampre–Caffita LAM
Nr.		Age		Pos.
151	Eddy Mazzoleni	31	Italy	13
152	Gianluca Bortolami	36	Italy	DNF
153	Salvatore Commesso	30	Italy	101
154	Gerrit Glomser	30	Austria	DNF
155	David Loosli	25	Switzerland	99
156	Evgeni Petrov	27	Russia	DNF
157	Daniele Righi	29	Italy	110
158	Alessandro Spezialetti	30	Italy	DNF
159	Gorazd Štangelj	32	Slovenia	87
Team manager: Fabrizio Bontempi

Team Gerolsteiner GST
Nr.		Age		Pos.
161	Georg Totschnig	34	Austria	26
162	Robert Förster	27	Germany	151
163	Sebastian Lang	25	Germany	65
164	Levi Leipheimer	31	USA	6
165	Michael Rich	35	Germany	130
166	Ronny Scholz	27	Germany	91
167	Fabian Wegmann	25	Germany	79
168	Peter Wrolich	31	Austria	146
169	Beat Zberg	34	Switzerland	93
Team manager: Hans-Michael Holczer

Française des Jeux FDJ
Nr.		Age		Pos.
171	Bradley McGee	29	Australia	105
172	Sandy Casar	26	France	29
173	Baden Cooke	26	Australia	142
174	Carlos Da Cruz	30	Spain	76
175	Bernhard Eisel	24	Austria	143
176	Philippe Gilbert	23	Belgium	70
177	Thomas Lövkvist	21	Sweden	61
178	Christophe Mengin	36	France	DNF
179	Francis Mourey	24	France	94
Team manager: Marc Madiot

Domina Vacanze DOM
Nr.		Age		Pos.
181	Serhiy Honchar	35	Ukraine	DNF
182	Alessandro Bertolini	33	Italy	113
183	Alessandro Cortinovis	27	Italy	98
184	Angelo Furlan	28	Italy	DNF
185	Andriy Hrivko	21	Ukraine	78
186	Maxim Iglinsky	24	Kazakhstan	37
187	Jörg Ludewig	29	Germany	38
188	Rafael Nuritdinov	28	Uzbekistan	147
189	Alessandro Vanotti	24	Italy	133
Team manager: Vittorio Algeri

Euskaltel–Euskadi EUS
Nr.		Age		Pos.
191	Iban Mayo	27	Spain	60
192	Iker Camaño	26	Spain	69
193	Unai Etxebarría	32	Venezuela	150
194	Íker Flores	28	Spain	155
195	David Herrero	25	Spain	DNF
196	Iñaki Isasi	28	Spain	122
197	Íñigo Landaluze	28	Spain	100
198	Egoi Martínez	27	Spain	48
199	Haimar Zubeldia	28	Spain	15
Team manager: Julián Gorospe

Ag2r A2R
Nr.		Age		Pos.
201	Jean-Patrick Nazon	28	France	DNF
202	Míkel Astarloza	25	Spain	27
203	Sylvain Calzati	26	France	DNF
204	Samuel Dumoulin	24	France	114
205	Simon Gerrans	25	Australia	126
206	Stéphane Goubert	35	France	34
207	Yuriy Krivtsov	26	Ukraine	90
208	Nicolas Portal	26	France	88
209	Ludovic Turpin	30	France	96
Team manager: Laurent Biondi

== See also ==
- 2005 Tour de France
- List of teams and cyclists in the 2004 Tour de France
