= List of teams and cyclists in the 2004 Tour de France =

The 2004 Tour de France was the 91st edition of Tour de France, one of cycling's Grand Tours. The Tour began in Liège on 3 July and finished on the Champs-Élysées in Paris on 25 July.

The first 14 teams in the UCI ranking at 31 January 2004 were automatically invited. These were: Wildcards were sent to a further seven teams.

Initially the organisers had an option for a 22nd team, which would be Kelme, but after Jesús Manzano exposed doping use in that team, Kelme was not invited, and the race started with 21 teams of nine cyclists.

== Teams ==
Qualified teams

- Fassa Bortolo
- Quick-Step–Davitamon
- T-Mobile Team
- Saeco
- Illes Balears–Banesto
- Gerolsteiner
- Cofidis
- Rabobank
- Liberty Seguros
- U.S. Postal Service
- Team CSC
- Alessio–Bianchi
- Euskaltel–Euskadi
- FDJeux.com

Invited teams

- AG2R Prévoyance
- Brioches La Boulangère
- Crédit Agricole
- Domina Vacanze
- Lotto–Domo
- Phonak
- R.A.G.T. Semences–MG Rover

== Cyclists ==
=== By starting number ===
Legend
No.	Starting number worn by the rider during the Tour
Pos.	Position in the general classification
DNF	Denotes a rider who did not finish
DNS	Denotes a rider who did not start

No.	Name	Nationality	Team	Pos.	Ref
1	~~Lance Armstrong~~	~~United States~~	~~US Postal–Berry Floor~~	~~1~~	
2	José Azevedo	Portugal	US Postal–Berry Floor	5	
3	Manuel Beltrán	Spain	US Postal–Berry Floor	46	
4	Viatcheslav Ekimov	Russia	US Postal–Berry Floor	80	
5	George Hincapie	United States	US Postal–Berry Floor	33	
6	Floyd Landis	United States	US Postal–Berry Floor	23	
7	Benjamín Noval	Spain	US Postal–Berry Floor	66	
8	Pavel Padrnos	Czech Republic	US Postal–Berry Floor	79	
9	José Luis Rubiera	Spain	US Postal–Berry Floor	19	
11	Jan Ullrich	Germany	T-Mobile Team	4	
12	Rolf Aldag	Germany	T-Mobile Team	69	
13	Santiago Botero	Colombia	T-Mobile Team	75	
14	Giuseppe Guerini	Italy	T-Mobile Team	25	
15	Sergei Ivanov	Russia	T-Mobile Team	57	
16	Matthias Kessler	Germany	T-Mobile Team	DNF	
17	Andreas Klöden	Germany	T-Mobile Team	2	
18	Daniele Nardello	Italy	T-Mobile Team	48	
19	Erik Zabel	Germany	T-Mobile Team	59	
21	Tyler Hamilton	United States	Phonak Hearing Systems	DNF	
22	Martin Elmiger	Switzerland	Phonak Hearing Systems	108	
23	Santos González	Spain	Phonak Hearing Systems	31	
24	Bert Grabsch	Germany	Phonak Hearing Systems	81	
25	José Enrique Gutiérrez	Spain	Phonak Hearing Systems	28	
26	Nicolas Jalabert	France	Phonak Hearing Systems	82	
27	Óscar Pereiro	Spain	Phonak Hearing Systems	10	
28	Santiago Pérez	Spain	Phonak Hearing Systems	49	
29	Óscar Sevilla	Spain	Phonak Hearing Systems	24	
31	Iban Mayo	Spain	Euskaltel–Euskadi	DNF	
32	Iker Camaño	Spain	Euskaltel–Euskadi	26	
33	David Etxebarria	Spain	Euskaltel–Euskadi	77	
34	Unai Etxebarria	Venezuela	Euskaltel–Euskadi	91	
35	Iker Flores	Spain	Euskaltel–Euskadi	60	
36	Iñigo Landaluze	Spain	Euskaltel–Euskadi	52	
37	Egoi Martínez	Spain	Euskaltel–Euskadi	41	
38	Haimar Zubeldia	Spain	Euskaltel–Euskadi	DNF	
39	Gorka González	Spain	Euskaltel–Euskadi	DNS	
41	Alessandro Petacchi	Italy	Fassa Bortolo	DNF	
42	Marzio Bruseghin	Italy	Fassa Bortolo	68	
43	Fabian Cancellara	Switzerland	Fassa Bortolo	109	
44	Juan Antonio Flecha	Spain	Fassa Bortolo	93	
45	Aitor González	Spain	Fassa Bortolo	45	
46	Kim Kirchen	Luxembourg	Fassa Bortolo	63	
47	Filippo Pozzato	Italy	Fassa Bortolo	116	
48	Matteo Tosatto	Italy	Fassa Bortolo	110	
49	Marco Velo	Italy	Fassa Bortolo	DNF	
51	Christophe Moreau	France	Crédit Agricole	12	
52	Alexander Bocharov	Russia	Crédit Agricole	36	
53	Julian Dean	New Zealand	Crédit Agricole	127	
54	Pierrick Fédrigo	France	Crédit Agricole	76	
55	Patrice Halgand	France	Crédit Agricole	39	
56	Sébastien Hinault	France	Crédit Agricole	DNF	
57	Thor Hushovd	Norway	Crédit Agricole	104	
58	Sébastien Joly	France	Crédit Agricole	146	
59	Benoît Salmon	France	Crédit Agricole	83	
61	Ivan Basso	Italy	Team CSC	3	
62	Kurt Asle Arvesen	Norway	Team CSC	123	
63	Michele Bartoli	Italy	Team CSC	DNF	
64	Bobby Julich	United States	Team CSC	40	
65	Andrea Peron	Italy	Team CSC	64	
66	Jakob Piil	Denmark	Team CSC	DNF	
67	Carlos Sastre	Spain	Team CSC	8	
68	Nicki Sørensen	Denmark	Team CSC	88	
69	Jens Voigt	Germany	Team CSC	35	
71	Francisco Mancebo	Spain	Illes Balears	6	
72	Daniel Becke	Germany	Illes Balears	DNF	
73	José Vicente García Acosta	Spain	Illes Balears	86	
74	Iván Gutiérrez	Spain	Illes Balears	51	
75	Vladimir Karpets	Russia	Illes Balears	13	
76	Denis Menchov	Russia	Illes Balears	DNF	
77	Aitor Osa	Spain	Illes Balears	50	
78	Mikel Pradera	Spain	Illes Balears	DNF	
79	Xabier Zandio	Spain	Illes Balears	97	
81	Georg Totschnig	Austria	Gerolsteiner	7	
82	René Haselbacher	Austria	Gerolsteiner	DNF	
83	Danilo Hondo	Austria	Gerolsteiner	106	
84	Sebastian Lang	Germany	Gerolsteiner	78	
85	Sven Montgomery	Switzerland	Gerolsteiner	DNF	
86	Uwe Peschel	Germany	Gerolsteiner	125	
87	Ronny Scholz	Germany	Gerolsteiner	53	
88	Fabian Wegmann	Germany	Gerolsteiner	DNF	
89	Peter Wrolich	Austria	Gerolsteiner	113	
91	Stuart O'Grady	Australia	Cofidis – Le Crédit par Téléphone	61	
92	Frédéric Bessy	France	Cofidis – Le Crédit par Téléphone	DNF	
93	Jimmy Casper	France	Cofidis – Le Crédit par Téléphone	147	
94	Christophe Edaleine	France	Cofidis – Le Crédit par Téléphone	141	
95	Jimmy Engoulvent	France	Cofidis – Le Crédit par Téléphone	138	
96	Dmitry Fofonov	Kazakhstan	Cofidis – Le Crédit par Téléphone	87	
97	David Moncoutié	France	Cofidis – Le Crédit par Téléphone	34	
98	Janek Tombak	Estonia	Cofidis – Le Crédit par Téléphone	DNF	
99	Peter Farazijn	Belgium	Cofidis – Le Crédit par Téléphone	107	
101	Richard Virenque	France	Quick Step–Davitamon	15	
102	Paolo Bettini	Italy	Quick Step–Davitamon	58	
103	Tom Boonen	Belgium	Quick Step–Davitamon	120	
104	Davide Bramati	Italy	Quick Step–Davitamon	DNF	
105	Laurent Dufaux	France	Quick Step–Davitamon	67	
106	Servais Knaven	Netherlands	Quick Step–Davitamon	142	
107	Juan Miguel Mercado	Spain	Quick Step–Davitamon	37	
108	Michael Rogers	Australia	Quick Step–Davitamon	22	
109	Stefano Zanini	Italy	Quick Step–Davitamon	126	
111	Roberto Heras	Spain	Liberty Seguros	DNF	
112	Dariusz Baranowski	Poland	Liberty Seguros	94	
113	Allan Davis	Australia	Liberty Seguros	98	
114	Igor González de Galdeano	Spain	Liberty Seguros	44	
115	Jan Hruška	Czech Republic	Liberty Seguros	117	
116	Isidro Nozal	Spain	Liberty Seguros	73	
117	Marcos Serrano	Spain	Liberty Seguros	54	
118	Christian Vande Velde	United States	Liberty Seguros	56	
119	Ángel Vicioso	Spain	Liberty Seguros	DNF	
121	Sylvain Chavanel	France	Brioches La Boulangère	30	
122	Walter Bénéteau	France	Brioches La Boulangère	102	
123	Anthony Charteau	France	Brioches La Boulangère	103	
124	Maryan Hary	France	Brioches La Boulangère	DNF	
125	Laurent Lefèvre	France	Brioches La Boulangère	DNF	
126	Jérôme Pineau	France	Brioches La Boulangère	27	
127	Franck Rénier	France	Brioches La Boulangère	114	
128	Didier Rous	France	Brioches La Boulangère	DNF	
129	Thomas Voeckler	France	Brioches La Boulangère	18	
131	Magnus Bäckstedt	Sweden	Alessio–Bianchi	DNF	
132	Fabio Baldato	Italy	Alessio–Bianchi	135	
133	Alessandro Bertolini	Italy	Alessio–Bianchi	DNF	
134	Pietro Caucchioli	Italy	Alessio–Bianchi	11	
135	Martin Hvastija	Slovenia	Alessio–Bianchi	DNF	
136	Marcus Ljungqvist	Sweden	Alessio–Bianchi	132	
137	Claus Michael Møller	Denmark	Alessio–Bianchi	70	
138	Andrea Noè	Italy	Alessio–Bianchi	99	
139	Scott Sunderland	Australia	Alessio–Bianchi	96	
141	Laurent Brochard	France	Ag2r Prévoyance	29	
142	Mikel Astarloza	Spain	Ag2r Prévoyance	62	
143	Samuel Dumoulin	France	Ag2r Prévoyance	DNF	
144	Stéphane Goubert	France	Ag2r Prévoyance	20	
145	Jaan Kirsipuu	Estonia	Ag2r Prévoyance	DNF	
146	Yuriy Krivtsov	Ukraine	Ag2r Prévoyance	95	
147	Jean-Patrick Nazon	France	Ag2r Prévoyance	137	
148	Nicolas Portal	France	Ag2r Prévoyance	72	
149	Mark Scanlon	Ireland	Ag2r Prévoyance	89	
151	Levi Leipheimer	United States	Rabobank	9	
152	Michael Boogerd	Netherlands	Rabobank	74	
153	Bram de Groot	Netherlands	Rabobank	111	
154	Erik Dekker	Netherlands	Rabobank	133	
155	Karsten Kroon	Netherlands	Rabobank	115	
156	Marc Lotz	Netherlands	Rabobank	90	
157	Grischa Niermann	Germany	Rabobank	65	
158	Michael Rasmussen	Denmark	Rabobank	14	
159	Marc Wauters	Belgium	Rabobank	112	
161	Bradley McGee	Australia	Française des Jeux	DNF	
162	Sandy Casar	France	Française des Jeux	16	
163	Baden Cooke	Australia	Française des Jeux	139	
164	Carlos Da Cruz	France	Française des Jeux	85	
165	Bernhard Eisel	Austria	Française des Jeux	131	
166	Frédéric Guesdon	France	Française des Jeux	129	
167	Christophe Mengin	France	Française des Jeux	84	
168	Jean-Cyril Robin	France	Française des Jeux	47	
169	Matthew Wilson	Australia	Française des Jeux	144	
171	Gilberto Simoni	Italy	Saeco	17	
172	Stefano Casagranda	Italy	Saeco	DNF	
173	Mirko Celestino	Italy	Saeco	DNF	
174	Salvatore Commesso	Italy	Saeco	124	
175	Gerrit Glomser	Austria	Saeco	DNF	
176	David Loosli	Switzerland	Saeco	105	
177	Jörg Ludewig	Germany	Saeco	55	
178	Evgeni Petrov	Russia	Saeco	38	
179	Marius Sabaliauskas	Lithuania	Saeco	42	
181	Robbie McEwen	Australia	Lotto–Domo	122	
182	Christophe Brandt	Belgium	Lotto–Domo	DNF	
183	Nick Gates	Australia	Lotto–Domo	DNF	
184	Thierry Marichal	Belgium	Lotto–Domo	101	
185	Axel Merckx	Belgium	Lotto–Domo	21	
186	Koos Moerenhout	Netherlands	Lotto–Domo	100	
187	Wim Vansevenant	Belgium	Lotto–Domo	140	
188	Rik Verbrugghe	Belgium	Lotto–Domo	43	
189	Aart Vierhouten	Netherlands	Lotto–Domo	DNF	
191	Mario Cipollini	Italy	Domina Vacanze	DNF	
192	Gian Matteo Fagnini	Italy	Domina Vacanze	DNF	
193	Massimo Giunti	Italy	Domina Vacanze	DNF	
194	Sergio Marinangeli	Italy	Domina Vacanze	DNF	
195	Massimiliano Mori	Italy	Domina Vacanze	121	
196	Michele Scarponi	Italy	Domina Vacanze	32	
197	Francesco Secchiari	Italy	Domina Vacanze	143	
198	Filippo Simeoni	Italy	Domina Vacanze	118	
199	Paolo Valoti	Italy	Domina Vacanze	DNF	
201	Christophe Rinero	France	R.A.G.T. Semences–MG Rover	92	
202	Guillaume Auger	France	R.A.G.T. Semences–MG Rover	136	
203	Pierre Bourquenoud	Switzerland	R.A.G.T. Semences–MG Rover	130	
204	Gilles Bouvard	France	R.A.G.T. Semences–MG Rover	128	
205	Sylvain Calzati	France	R.A.G.T. Semences–MG Rover	71	
206	Frédéric Finot	France	R.A.G.T. Semences–MG Rover	145	
207	Christophe Laurent	France	R.A.G.T. Semences–MG Rover	134	
208	Ludovic Martin	France	R.A.G.T. Semences–MG Rover	119	
209	Eddy Seigneur	France	R.A.G.T. Semences–MG Rover	DNF	

=== By team ===
"DNF" indicates that a rider did not finish the 2004 Tour de France. "DNS" indicates that a rider did not start.

US Postal–Berry Floor (United States) USP
No.	Rider	Pos.
1	~~Lance Armstrong (USA)~~	~~1*~~
2	José Azevedo (POR)	5
3	Manuel Beltrán (ESP)	46
4	Viatcheslav Ekimov (RUS)	80
5	George Hincapie (USA)	33
6	Floyd Landis (USA)	23
7	Benjamín Noval (ESP)	66
8	Pavel Padrnos (CZE)	79
9	José Luis Rubiera (ESP)	19
Directeur sportif: Johan Bruyneel

T-Mobile Team (Germany) TMO
No.	Rider	Pos.
11	Jan Ullrich (GER)	4
12	Rolf Aldag (GER)	69
13	Santiago Botero (COL)	75
14	Giuseppe Guerini (ITA)	25
15	Sergei Ivanov (RUS)	57
16	Matthias Kessler (GER)	DNF
17	Andreas Klöden (GER)	2*
18	Daniele Nardello (ITA)	48
19	Erik Zabel (GER)	59
Directeur sportif: Walter Godefroot

Phonak Hearing Systems (Switzerland) PHO
No.	Rider	Pos.
21	Tyler Hamilton (USA)	DNF
22	Martin Elmiger (SUI)	108
23	Santos González (ESP)	31
24	Bert Grabsch (GER)	81
25	José Enrique Gutiérrez (ESP)	28
26	Nicolas Jalabert (FRA)	82
27	Óscar Pereiro (ESP)	10*
28	Santiago Pérez (ESP)	49
29	Óscar Sevilla (ESP)	24
Directeur sportif: Urs Freuler

Euskaltel–Euskadi (Spain) EUS
No.	Rider	Pos.
31	Iban Mayo (ESP)	DNF
32	Iker Camaño (ESP)	26*
33	David Etxebarria (ESP)	77
34	Unai Etxebarria (VEN)	91
35	Iker Flores (ESP)	60
36	Iñigo Landaluze (ESP)	52
37	Egoi Martínez (ESP)	41
38	Haimar Zubeldia (ESP)	DNF
39	Gorka González (Note: Gorka González did not join the departure, due to being found with an excessive hematocrit level.) (ESP)	DNS
Directeur sportif: Julián Gorospe

Fassa Bortolo (Italy) FAS
No.	Rider	Pos.
41	Alessandro Petacchi (ITA)	DNF
42	Marzio Bruseghin (ITA)	68
43	Fabian Cancellara (SUI)	109
44	Juan Antonio Flecha (ESP)	93
45	Aitor González (ESP)	45*
46	Kim Kirchen (LUX)	63
47	Filippo Pozzato (ITA)	116
48	Matteo Tosatto (ITA)	110
49	Marco Velo (ITA)	DNF
Directeur sportif: Giancarlo Ferretti

Crédit Agricole (France) C.A
No.	Rider	Pos.
51	Christophe Moreau (FRA)	12*
52	Alexander Bocharov (RUS)	36
53	Julian Dean (NZL)	127
54	Pierrick Fédrigo (FRA)	76
55	Patrice Halgand (FRA)	39
56	Sébastien Hinault (FRA)	DNF
57	Thor Hushovd (NOR)	104
58	Sébastien Joly (FRA)	146
59	Benoît Salmon (FRA)	83
Directeur sportif: Roger Legeay

Team CSC (Denmark) CSC
No.	Rider	Pos.
61	Ivan Basso (ITA)	3*
62	Kurt Asle Arvesen (NOR)	123
63	Michele Bartoli (ITA)	DNF
64	Bobby Julich (USA)	40
65	Andrea Peron (ITA)	64
66	Jakob Piil (DEN)	DNF
67	Carlos Sastre (ESP)	8
68	Nicki Sørensen (DEN)	88
69	Jens Voigt (GER)	35
Directeur sportif: Bjarne Riis

Illes Balears (Spain) IBB
No.	Rider	Pos.
71	Francisco Mancebo (ESP)	6*
72	Daniel Becke (GER)	DNF
73	José Vicente García Acosta (ESP)	86
74	Iván Gutiérrez (ESP)	51
75	Vladimir Karpets (RUS)	13
76	Denis Menchov (RUS)	DNF
77	Aitor Osa (ESP)	50
78	Mikel Pradera (ESP)	DNF
79	Xabier Zandio (ESP)	97
Directeur sportif: Eusebio Unzué

Gerolsteiner (Germany) GST
No.	Rider	Pos.
81	Georg Totschnig (AUT)	7*
82	René Haselbacher (AUT)	DNF
83	Danilo Hondo (GER)	106
84	Sebastian Lang (GER)	78
85	Sven Montgomery (SUI)	DNF
86	Uwe Peschel (GER)	125
87	Ronny Scholz (GER)	53
88	Fabian Wegmann (GER)	DNF
89	Peter Wrolich (AUT)	113
Directeur sportif: Hans-Michael Holczer

Cofidis – Le Crédit par Téléphone (France) COF
No.	Rider	Pos.
91	Stuart O'Grady (AUS)	61
92	Frédéric Bessy (FRA)	DNF
93	Jimmy Casper (FRA)	147
94	Christophe Edaleine (FRA)	141
95	Jimmy Engoulvent (FRA)	138
96	Dmitry Fofonov (KAZ)	87
97	David Moncoutié (FRA)	34*
98	Janek Tombak (EST)	DNF
99	Peter Farazijn (Note: Originally Australian rider Matthew White was selected for Cofidis, but as following a crash during the warmup for the prologue he had to withdraw, and Peter Farazijn took his spot.) (BEL)	107
Directeur sportif: Francis van Londersele

Quick Step–Davitamon (Belgium) QSD
No.	Rider	Pos.
101	Richard Virenque (FRA)	15*
102	Paolo Bettini (ITA)	58
103	Tom Boonen (BEL)	120
104	Davide Bramati (ITA)	DNF
105	Laurent Dufaux (SUI)	67
106	Servais Knaven (NED)	142
107	Juan Miguel Mercado (ESP)	37
108	Michael Rogers (AUS)	22
109	Stefano Zanini (ITA)	126
Directeur sportif: Patrick Lefevere

Liberty Seguros (Spain) LST
No.	Rider	Pos.
111	Roberto Heras (ESP)	DNF
112	Dariusz Baranowski (POL)	94
113	Allan Davis (AUS)	98
114	Igor González de Galdeano (ESP)	44*
115	Jan Hruška (CZE)	117
116	Isidro Nozal (ESP)	73
117	Marcos Serrano (ESP)	54
118	Christian Vande Velde (USA)	56
119	Ángel Vicioso (ESP)	DNF
Directeur sportif: Manolo Sáiz

Brioches La Boulangère (France) BLB
No.	Rider	Pos.
121	Sylvain Chavanel (FRA)	30
122	Walter Bénéteau (FRA)	102
123	Anthony Charteau (FRA)	103
124	Maryan Hary (FRA)	DNF
125	Laurent Lefèvre (FRA)	DNF
126	Jérôme Pineau (FRA)	27
127	Franck Rénier (FRA)	114
128	Didier Rous (FRA)	DNF
129	Thomas Voeckler (FRA)	18*
Directeur sportif: Jean-René Bernaudeau

Alessio–Bianchi (Italy) ALB
No.	Rider	Pos.
131	Magnus Bäckstedt (SWE)	DNF
132	Fabio Baldato (ITA)	135
133	Alessandro Bertolini (ITA)	DNF
134	Pietro Caucchioli (ITA)	11*
135	Martin Hvastija (SLO)	DNF
136	Marcus Ljungqvist (SWE)	132
137	Claus Michael Møller (DEN)	70
138	Andrea Noè (ITA)	99
139	Scott Sunderland (AUS)	96
Directeur sportif: Bruno Cenghialta

Ag2r Prévoyance (France) A2R
No.	Rider	Pos.
141	Laurent Brochard (FRA)	29
142	Mikel Astarloza (ESP)	62
143	Samuel Dumoulin (FRA)	DNF
144	Stéphane Goubert (FRA)	20*
145	Jaan Kirsipuu (EST)	DNF
146	Yuriy Krivtsov (UKR)	95
147	Jean-Patrick Nazon (FRA)	137
148	Nicolas Portal (FRA)	72
149	Mark Scanlon (IRL)	89
Directeur sportif: Vincent Lavenu

Rabobank (Netherlands) RAB
No.	Rider	Pos.
151	Levi Leipheimer (USA)	9*
152	Michael Boogerd (NED)	74
153	Bram de Groot (NED)	111
154	Erik Dekker (NED)	133
155	Karsten Kroon (NED)	115
156	Marc Lotz (NED)	90
157	Grischa Niermann (GER)	65
158	Michael Rasmussen (DEN)	14
159	Marc Wauters (BEL)	112
Directeur sportif: Theo de Rooij

Française des Jeux (France) FDJ
No.	Rider	Pos.
161	Bradley McGee (AUS)	DNF
162	Sandy Casar (FRA)	16*
163	Baden Cooke (AUS)	139
164	Carlos Da Cruz (FRA)	85
165	Bernhard Eisel (AUT)	131
166	Frédéric Guesdon (FRA)	129
167	Christophe Mengin (FRA)	84
168	Jean-Cyril Robin (FRA)	47
169	Matthew Wilson (AUS)	144
Directeur sportif: Marc Madiot

Saeco (Italy) SAE
No.	Rider	Pos.
171	Gilberto Simoni (ITA)	17*
172	Stefano Casagranda (ITA)	DNF
173	Mirko Celestino (ITA)	DNF
174	Salvatore Commesso (ITA)	124
175	Gerrit Glomser (AUT)	DNF
176	David Loosli (SUI)	105
177	Jörg Ludewig (GER)	55
178	Evgeni Petrov (RUS)	38
179	Marius Sabaliauskas (LTU)	42
Directeur sportif: Claudio Corti

Lotto–Domo (Belgium) LOT
No.	Rider	Pos.
181	Robbie McEwen (AUS)	122
182	Christophe Brandt (BEL)	DNF
183	Nick Gates (AUS)	DNF
184	Thierry Marichal (BEL)	101
185	Axel Merckx (BEL)	21*
186	Koos Moerenhout (NED)	100
187	Wim Vansevenant (BEL)	140
188	Rik Verbrugghe (BEL)	43
189	Aart Vierhouten (NED)	DNF
Directeur sportif: Marc Sergeant

Domina Vacanze (Italy) DVE
No.	Rider	Pos.
191	Mario Cipollini (ITA)	DNF
192	Gian Matteo Fagnini (ITA)	DNF
193	Massimo Giunti (ITA)	DNF
194	Sergio Marinangeli (ITA)	DNF
195	Massimiliano Mori (ITA)	121
196	Michele Scarponi (ITA)	32*
197	Francesco Secchiari (ITA)	143
198	Filippo Simeoni (ITA)	118
199	Paolo Valoti (ITA)	DNF
Directeur sportif: Vincenzo Santoni

R.A.G.T. Semences–MG Rover (France) RAG
No.	Rider	Pos.
201	Christophe Rinero (FRA)	92*
202	Guillaume Auger (FRA)	136
203	Pierre Bourquenoud (SUI)	130
204	Gilles Bouvard (FRA)	128
205	Sylvain Calzati (FRA)	71
206	Frédéric Finot (FRA)	145
207	Christophe Laurent (FRA)	134
208	Ludovic Martin (FRA)	119
209	Eddy Seigneur (FRA)	DNF
Directeur sportif: Jean-Luc Jonrond

- indicates highest placed rider of the team in the final overall classification.
