= 2006 Tour de France, Stage 12 to Stage 20 =

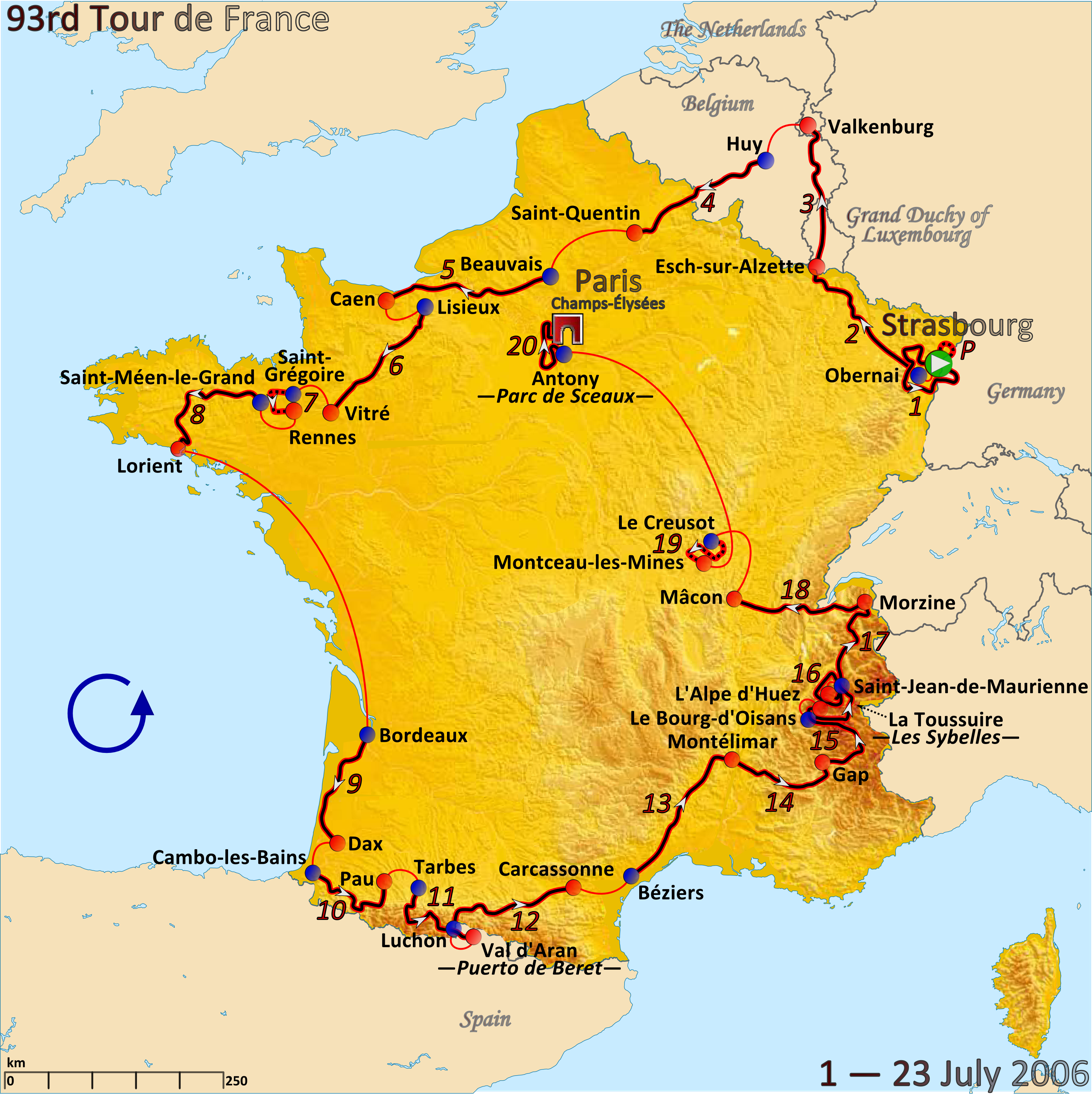
Route of the 2006 Tour de France

The 2006 Tour de France was the 93rd edition of Tour de France, one of cycling's Grand Tours. The Tour began in Strasbourg with a prologue individual time trial on 1 July and Stage 12 occurred on 14 July with a hilly stage from Bagnères-de-Luchon. The race finished on the Champs-Élysées in Paris, on 23 July.

A positive test for epitestosterone by Floyd Landis after Stage 17, however, left the results of the Tour de France in doubt, with the possibility that all of his records may be expunged, pending a hearing with the Court of Arbitration for Sport. On 20 September 2007, Landis was found guilty of doping and ordered that he forfeit his 2006 Tour de France victory, making Óscar Pereiro the official winner.

== Stage 12 ==
14 July 2006 — Luchon to Carcassonne, 212 km (131.7 mi)

Stage 12 started in the Luchon, which held big celebrations because this was the fiftieth time that the Tour de France visited the city. The stage end location was Carcassonne and in between those cities the course featured four categorized climbs:

- Col des Ares (Category 2 at 27.0 km/16.8 miles)
- Côte des Pujos (Category 4 at 47.5 km/29.5 miles)
- Côte du Pâl de Pailhes (Category 4 at 126.0 km/78.3 miles)
- Côte du Palmiers (Category 4 at 136.0 km/84.5 miles)

There were also two intermediate sprints in Caumont (at 76.0 km/47.2 miles) and Mirepoix (162.0 km/100.7 miles).

This being the first stage after the Pyrenees, many riders were hoping to get an easy day, sitting at the back of the peloton; however, there were also a lot of riders who had lost a lot of time during those mountain stages and who knew that they were not going to get a good position in the general standings. Those riders all tried to get into the escape group which led to everyone chasing everyone for the first 100 kilometers and an extremely fast pace which caused the first riders already passing the 46-kilometre mark after just one hour. As a result, 4 riders dropped from the race during the first hour; among those were Paolo Savoldelli and Benjamín Noval from Discovery Channel and the sprinter Isaac Gálvez. Another important fact for the large number of riders trying to escape was that it was 14 July, in France known as Bastille Day. On this day the French are extra motivated as it is their national holiday, which shows in the results of the latest years with David Moncoutié winning in 2005 and Richard Virenque in 2004 on this day.

So a lot of changing situations during the first hours of this race, as there was always some team not happy with the current group of escapees. On the first climb of the day the first serious group formed, consisting of 15 riders:

- Michael Albasini, Switzerland, Liquigas,
- Daniele Bennati, Italy, Lampre–Fondital,
- Sylvain Chavanel, France, Cofidis,
- Damiano Cunego, Italy, Lampre–Fondital,
- Stéphane Goubert, France, AG2R Prévoyance,
- Giuseppe Guerini, Italy, T-Mobile Team,
- George Hincapie, United States, Discovery Channel,
- Thor Hushovd, Norway, Crédit Agricole,
- David Millar, United Kingdom, Saunier Duval–Prodir,
- David Moncoutié, France, Cofidis,
- Cristian Moreni, Italy, Cofidis,
- Óscar Pereiro, Spain, Caisse d'Epargne–Illes Balears,
- Michael Rasmussen, Denmark, Rabobank,
- Gorka Verdugo, Spain, Euskaltel–Euskadi and
- Jens Voigt, Germany, Team CSC.

This group looked to be getting away from the peloton at first, but suddenly Davitamon–Lotto started working for Robbie McEwen as sprinters Bennati and Hushovd were in this group. They were working hard to keep the gap between the peloton and the group reasonable, but of course the leaders tried to stay ahead too. This led to the gap fluctuating between 45" and 1'15" for a very long time. From this group which formed after about 30 kilometres, six riders dropped as they waited for the peloton after 70 kilometres, knowing that they would not let the group go. Meanwhile, Albasini, Bennati, Goubert, Guerini, Hincapie, Millar, Moncoutié, Verdugo and Voigt pushed on. Bennati then won the intermediate sprint and Davitamon–Lotto stopped working, but now the teams from Bouygues Télécom and Team Milram were trying to close the gap as they did not have any riders up front. Finally they succeeded at kilometre 94. As soon as the breakaway group was caught, a new group formed which now consisted of only four riders:

- Alessandro Ballan, Italy, Lampre–Fondital,
- Óscar Freire, Spain, Rabobank,
- Christophe Le Mével, France, Crédit Agricole and
- Yaroslav Popovych, Ukraine, Discovery Channel.

Again, Robbie McEwen was dissatisfied with Óscar Freire in the breakaway group. But when he tried to initiate another chase, virtually everyone else from the peloton fought against him because they had already been cycling hard for more than 100 kilometres, only a day after an arduous climb. It took McEwen some time to calm down before he gave up and allowed the group to set off as the breakaway group. After this, Phonak cyclists maintained a steady pace, keeping the breakaway group within range while conserving energy. Most cyclists were satisfied with the breakaway and winning the stage looked increasingly likely for one of the four leaders.

Looking at the leading group, it was reasonable to think that Ballan, Le Mével or Popovych was going to attack sooner or later, as Freire is a top-class sprinter and would probably beat them all if they went to the finish line together. Yaroslav Popovych was the first to attack and immediately the French got disappointed as Christophe Le Mével dropped and never managed to come back. Alessandro Ballan however closed the gap and brought Óscar Freire back in his wheel. It was then Freire's turn to attack, but again Ballan closed the gap and now brought back Popovych. Popovych and Freire both took turns in attacking but Ballan seemed to be the strongest as he closed the gap every time. However, after a while he was also getting tired and could not respond to yet another attack by Popovych. He did not get any help from Freire in closing the gap and so Popovych won the stage. Freire knew he did not deserve the second place and left it to Ballan; however, this could cost him the green jersey in the end. Le Mével finished as fourth and in the peloton it was Tom Boonen who convincingly won the sprint for the fifth place, 4'25" behind Popovych.

As a result of this stage Floyd Landis remains in yellow and Yaroslav Popovych just moved into the top 10 at place 10. Robbie McEwen still holds a considerable lead of 25 points over Óscar Freire in the standings for the green jersey but sees Freire come 11 points closer, Daniele Bennati 3 points and Tom Boonen 1 point. Michael Rasmussen scored 12 points today for the polka dot jersey, but is still 19 points behind David de la Fuente. Markus Fothen stays the best rider under 23 and also in the team standings nothing changes, T-Mobile Team keeps a small lead over Gerolsteiner. Next to the earlier mentioned quitters, today Agritubel also loses two riders who give up — José Alberto Martínez and Samuel Plouhinec. Daniele Bennati, who was not amongst the escaped riders but was almost constantly in the offense during the first 100 kilometres, received the combativity trophy for the day.

Stage 12 result

Rank	Rider	Team	Time
1	Yaroslav Popovych (UKR)	Discovery Channel	4h 34' 58"
2	Alessandro Ballan (ITA)	Lampre–Fondital	+ 27"
3	Óscar Freire (ESP)	Rabobank	+ 29"
4	Christophe Le Mével (FRA)	Crédit Agricole	+ 35"
5	Tom Boonen (BEL)	Quick-Step–Innergetic	+ 4' 25"
6	Robbie McEwen (AUS)	Davitamon–Lotto	s.t.
7	Francisco Ventoso (ESP)	Saunier Duval–Prodir	s.t.
8	Erik Zabel (GER)	Team Milram	s.t.
9	Daniele Bennati (ITA)	Lampre–Fondital	s.t.
10	Thor Hushovd (NOR)	Crédit Agricole	s.t.

General classification after stage 12

Rank	Rider	Team	Time
1	Floyd Landis (USA)	Phonak	53h 57' 30"
2	Cyril Dessel (FRA)	AG2R Prévoyance	+ 8"
3	Denis Menchov (RUS)	Rabobank	+ 1' 01"
4	Cadel Evans (AUS)	Davitamon–Lotto	+ 1' 17"
5	Carlos Sastre (ESP)	Team CSC	+ 1' 52"
6	Andreas Klöden (GER)	T-Mobile Team	+ 2' 29"
7	Michael Rogers (AUS)	T-Mobile Team	+ 3' 22"
8	Juan Miguel Mercado (ESP)	Agritubel	+ 3' 33"
9	Christophe Moreau (FRA)	AG2R Prévoyance	+ 3' 44"
10	Yaroslav Popovych (UKR)	Discovery Channel	+ 4' 15"

== Stage 13 ==
15 July 2006 — Béziers to Montélimar, 230 km (142.9 mi)

This stage had five categorized climbs, all Category 4. It started at Béziers and ended at Montélimar.

This stage was characterized by an early attack including six riders — Voigt, Pereiro, Chavanel, Coyot, Quinziato, and Grivko, who attacked about 20 km into the race. As Cofidis had two riders in the lead group, Chavanel and Coyot, they decided to have Coyot wait for the peloton.

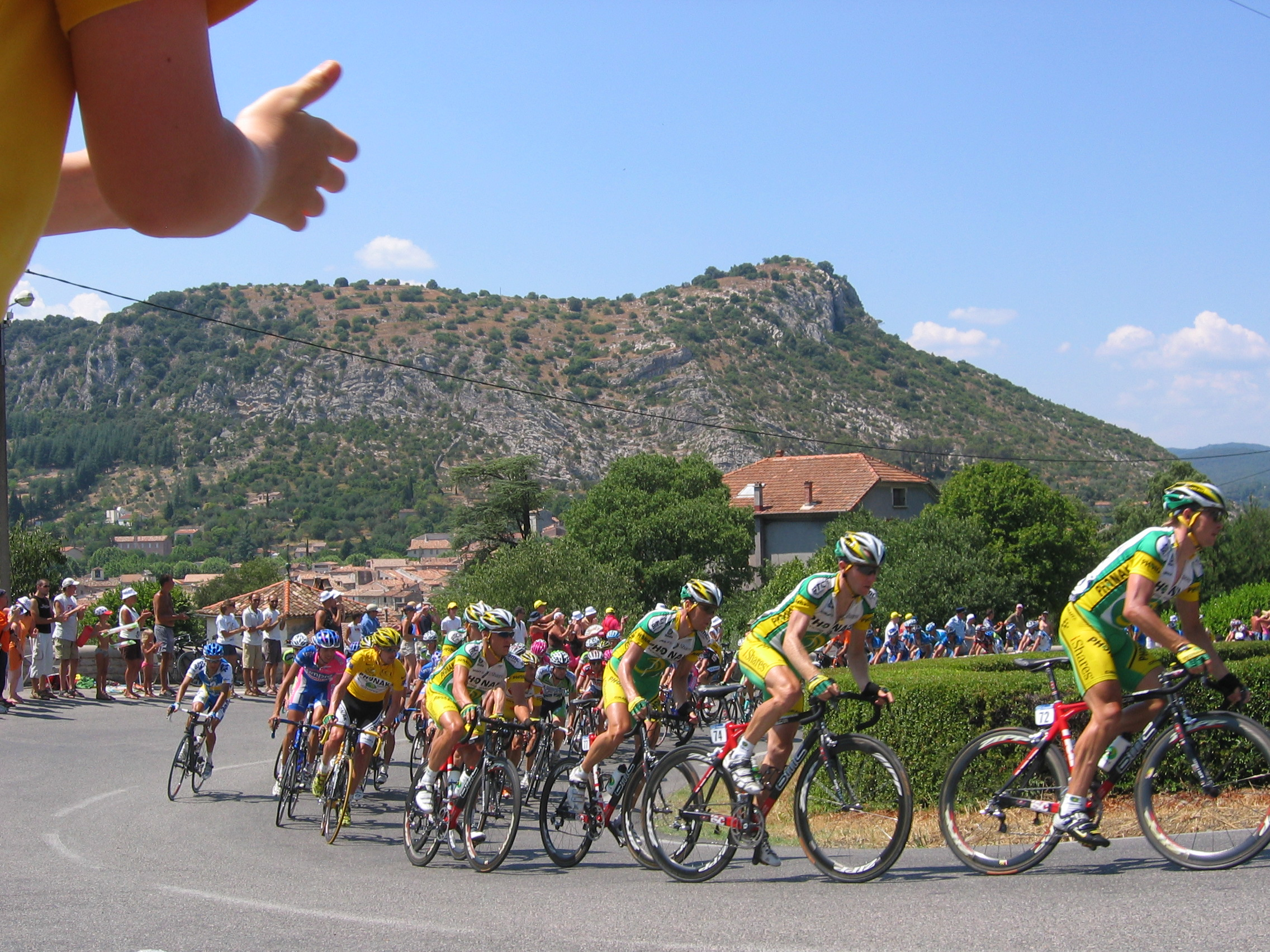
Team Phonak on Stage 13, Cóte de L'Arbousset

The main peloton, including Floyd Landis, did not see anyone in this group as a threat, so they allowed them to get away and stay away. The attack group of five had a lead of 30 seconds at 27 km. They continued to increase their lead—to 3 minutes at 37 km, 6'20" at 47.5 km, and 11'05" at 61.5 km after the category-4 Cóte de Puéchabon climb. At the beginning of the third climb, the Cóte de L'Arbousset at 119.5 km, the lead was 18'50". The lead grew to 24'45" at the 146.5 mark, and to 27'10" at 172.5 km. Pereiro had begun the stage 28'50" behind Landis. Now he was threatening Landis's yellow.

But this was intentional, because the previous mountain stages had shown that from Landis's teammates, only Axel Merckx was somewhat able to stay with Landis and help him. Through losing the yellow jersey, the Phonak team made sure that those teammates did not have to ride after the escaped riders every day; instead they now leave that responsibility to Pereiro's team, Caisse d'Epargne–Illes Balears.

On the final climb, the Cóte de Villeneuve de Berg, youngster Grivko attacked. Just like most times, the first attacker is not the winning rider, as the group was able to catch and pass him. Grivko never managed to return and finished fifth. In the final five kilometres, Voigt and Pereiro broke away from Chavanel and Quinziato, who were both expecting the other to close the gap. Neither of them did, and the other two maintained their lead the rest of the way. In the final hundred meters, Pereiro was on Voigt's rear wheel, angling to pass him at the finish. Voigt held him off and barely won the stage.

In the peloton, the teammates of Menchov from Rabobank started increasing the pace, as they wanted Landis to remain in yellow to have his teammates work hard the next few days. After a few kilometres, however, they gave up and so the peloton finished 29'57" behind Voigt. Pereiro was rewarded for ending second and earned the yellow—one minute, 29 seconds ahead of Landis. The peloton came in past the time limit of 29'00", but since more than 20% of all riders were involved, they were allowed to stay in the race. Apart from the team standing, where Team CSC took the lead, all other jerseys remained with their rider, as the breakaway group had taken most points of the climbs and sprints.

Stage 13 result

Rank	Rider	Team	Time
1	Jens Voigt (GER)	Team CSC	5h 24'36"
2	Óscar Pereiro (ESP)	Caisse d'Epargne–Illes Balears	s.t.
3	Sylvain Chavanel (FRA)	Cofidis	+ 40"
4	Manuel Quinziato (ITA)	Liquigas	+ 40"
5	Andriy Hrivko (UKR)	Team Milram	+ 6' 24"
6	Robbie McEwen (AUS)	Davitamon–Lotto	+ 29' 57"
7	Bernhard Eisel (AUT)	Française des Jeux	s.t.
8	Tom Boonen (BEL)	Quick-Step–Innergetic	s.t.
9	Carlos Da Cruz (FRA)	Française des Jeux	s.t.
10	Arnaud Coyot (FRA)	Cofidis	s.t.

General classification after stage 13

Rank	Rider	Team	Time
1	Óscar Pereiro (ESP)	Caisse d'Epargne–Illes Balears	59h 50' 34"
2	Floyd Landis (USA)	Phonak	+ 1' 29"
3	Cyril Dessel (FRA)	AG2R Prévoyance	+ 1' 37"
4	Denis Menchov (RUS)	Rabobank	+ 2' 30"
5	Cadel Evans (AUS)	Davitamon–Lotto	+ 2' 46"
6	Carlos Sastre (ESP)	Team CSC	+ 3' 21"
7	Andreas Klöden (GER)	T-Mobile Team	+ 3' 58"
8	Michael Rogers (AUS)	T-Mobile Team	+ 4' 51"
9	Juan Miguel Mercado (ESP)	Agritubel	+ 5' 02"
10	Christophe Moreau (FRA)	AG2R Prévoyance	+ 5' 13"

== Stage 14 ==
16 July 2006 — Montélimar to Gap 230 km (142.9 mi)

This stage had four categorized climbs— two Category 3, and two Category 2. It started at Montélimar and ended at Gap.

The categorized climbs were as follows:

- Côte du Bois-de-Salles (Category 3), 4.2% over 5.1 km
- Col de Peyruergue (Category 3), 4.8% over 5.5 km
- Col de Perty (Category 2), 5.1% over 8.8 km
- Col de la Sentinelle (Category 2), 5% over 5.2 km

There were also two intermediate sprints in La Bonté (at 50.0 km) and La Plaine (at 160.5 km).

After 39 kilometres, five riders broke away — Egoi Martínez, Matthias Kessler, Pierrick Fédrigo, Mario Aerts and Salvatore Commesso. Rik Verbrugghe and David Cañada joined the group later on, while Martinez dropped out.

With 39 kilometres to go, Verbrugghe, Kessler and Cañada were involved in a crash at downhill right-hander. Verbrugghe and Cañada were injured and had to abandon the race. Kessler could continue but was soon caught by the peloton. Of the remaining three riders, Aerts was dropped and caught by a peloton. The peloton was not able to catch Fédrigo and Commesso who had a sprint for a stage victory, with the Frenchman taking the glory. Christian Vande Velde attacked from the peloton late to get third place. Óscar Pereiro finished 26th and retained the yellow jersey.

Stage 14 result

Rank	Rider	Team	Time
1	Pierrick Fédrigo (FRA)	Bouygues Télécom	4h 14' 23"
2	Salvatore Commesso (ITA)	Lampre–Fondital	s.t.
3	Christian Vande Velde (USA)	Team CSC	+ 3"
4	Christophe Moreau (FRA)	AG2R Prévoyance	+ 7"
5	Georg Totschnig (AUT)	Gerolsteiner	s.t.
6	Stefano Garzelli (ITA)	Liquigas	s.t.
7	Michael Boogerd (NED)	Rabobank	s.t.
8	Cristian Moreni (ITA)	Cofidis	s.t.
9	George Hincapie (USA)	Discovery Channel	s.t.
10	Cadel Evans (AUS)	Davitamon–Lotto	s.t.

General classification after stage 14

Rank	Rider	Team	Time
1	Óscar Pereiro (ESP)	Caisse d'Epargne–Illes Balears	64h 05' 04"
2	Floyd Landis (USA)	Phonak	+ 1' 29"
3	Cyril Dessel (FRA)	AG2R Prévoyance	+ 1' 37"
4	Denis Menchov (RUS)	Rabobank	+ 2' 30"
5	Cadel Evans (AUS)	Davitamon–Lotto	+ 2' 46"
6	Carlos Sastre (ESP)	Team CSC	+ 3' 21"
7	Andreas Klöden (GER)	T-Mobile Team	+ 3' 58"
8	Michael Rogers (AUS)	T-Mobile Team	+ 4' 51"
9	Juan Miguel Mercado (ESP)	Agritubel	+ 5' 02"
10	Christophe Moreau (FRA)	AG2R Prévoyance	+ 5' 13"

== Rest day 2 ==
17 July 2006 — Gap

== Stage 15 ==
18 July 2006 — Gap to L'Alpe-d'Huez, 187 km (116.2 mi)

This was a mountain stage with three categorized climbs: the Col d'Izoard (Highest Level) with an ascent of 7% over 14.5 km, the Col du Lautaret (Category 2) with an ascent of 4.4% over 12.1 km and Alpe d'Huez (Highest Level) with an ascent of 7.9% over 13.8 km. It started at Gap at 785 m and ended at L'Alpe-d'Huez at 1850 m.

Alpe d'Huez is one of the famous climbs that often figures on the Tour de France. Although Fränk Schleck from Luxembourg won the stage, American Floyd Landis' fourth-place finish was enough to regain the yellow jersey.

Stage 15 result

Rank	Rider	Team	Time
1	Fränk Schleck (LUX)	Team CSC	4h 52' 22"
2	Damiano Cunego (ITA)	Lampre–Fondital	+ 11"
3	Stefano Garzelli (ITA)	Liquigas	+ 1' 10"
4	Floyd Landis (USA)	Phonak	s.t.
5	Andreas Klöden (GER)	T-Mobile Team	s.t.
6	Rubén Lobato (ESP)	Saunier Duval–Prodir	+ 1' 14"
7	Sylvain Chavanel (FRA)	Cofidis	+ 1' 18"
8	Eddy Mazzoleni (ITA)	T-Mobile Team	+ 1' 28"
9	Carlos Sastre (ESP)	Team CSC	+ 1' 35"
10	Levi Leipheimer (USA)	Gerolsteiner	+ 1' 49"

General classification after stage 15

Rank	Rider	Team	Time
1	Floyd Landis (USA)	Phonak	69h 00' 05"
2	Óscar Pereiro (ESP)	Caisse d'Epargne–Illes Balears	+ 10"
3	Cyril Dessel (FRA)	AG2R Prévoyance	+ 2' 02"
4	Denis Menchov (RUS)	Rabobank	+ 2' 12"
5	Carlos Sastre (ESP)	Team CSC	+ 2' 17"
6	Andreas Klöden (GER)	T-Mobile Team	+ 2' 29"
7	Cadel Evans (AUS)	Davitamon–Lotto	+ 2' 56"
8	Michael Rogers (AUS)	T-Mobile Team	+ 5' 01"
9	Levi Leipheimer (USA)	Gerolsteiner	+ 6' 18"
10	Haimar Zubeldia (ESP)	Euskaltel–Euskadi	+ 6' 20"

== Stage 16 ==
19 July 2006 — Bourg-d'Oisans to La Toussuire, 182 km (113.1 mi)

This was a mountain stage with four categorized climbs: the Col du Galibier (Hors catégorie) with a 4.5% ascent over 42.8 km, the Col de la Croix-de-Fer (Hors catégorie) with a 6.9% ascent over 22.7 km, the Col du Mollard (Category 2) with a 6.8% ascent over 5.8 km, and La Toussuire (Category 1) with an ascent of 6% over 18.4 km. It began at Bourg-d'Oisans and ended at La Toussuire.

The Dane, Michael Rasmussen won the stage, and Spaniard Óscar Pereiro came in third, retaking the yellow jersey from American Floyd Landis, who came in 23rd on the day dropping to 11th overall.

Italian Daniele Bennati of the Lampre team was injured in a fall and unable to continue the race. French rider Sylvain Chavanel fell in the same descent, but continued after being examined.

Stage 16 result

Rank	Rider	Team	Time
1	Michael Rasmussen (DEN)	Rabobank	5h 36'04"
2	Carlos Sastre (ESP)	Team CSC	+ 1' 41"
3	Óscar Pereiro (ESP)	Caisse d'Epargne–Illes Balears	+ 1' 54"
4	Cadel Evans (AUS)	Davitamon–Lotto	+ 1' 56"
5	Andreas Klöden (GER)	T-Mobile Team	s.t.
6	Christophe Moreau (FRA)	AG2R Prévoyance	+ 2' 37"
7	Pietro Caucchioli (ITA)	Crédit Agricole	s.t.
8	Cyril Dessel (FRA)	AG2R Prévoyance	s.t.
9	Levi Leipheimer (USA)	Gerolsteiner	+ 3' 24"
10	Haimar Zubeldia (ESP)	Euskaltel–Euskadi	+ 3' 42"

General classification after stage 16

Rank	Rider	Team	Time
1	Óscar Pereiro (ESP)	Caisse d'Epargne–Illes Balears	74h 38'05"
2	Carlos Sastre (ESP)	Team CSC	+ 1' 50"
3	Andreas Klöden (GER)	T-Mobile Team	+ 2' 29"
4	Cyril Dessel (FRA)	AG2R Prévoyance	+ 2' 43"
5	Cadel Evans (AUS)	Davitamon–Lotto	+ 2' 56"
6	Denis Menchov (RUS)	Rabobank	+ 3' 58"
7	Michael Rogers (AUS)	T-Mobile Team	+ 6' 47"
8	Christophe Moreau (FRA)	AG2R Prévoyance	+ 7' 03"
9	Levi Leipheimer (USA)	Gerolsteiner	+ 7' 46"
10	Haimar Zubeldia (ESP)	Euskaltel–Euskadi	+ 8' 06"

== Stage 17 ==
20 July 2006 — St.-Jean-de-Maurienne to Morzine, 201 km (124.9 mi)

This was a mountain stage with five categorized climbs: the Col des Saisies (Category 1) with an ascent of 6.4% over 14.9 km, the Col des Aravis (Category 2) with an ascent of 7.7% over 5.9 km, the Col de la Colombière (Category 1) with an ascent of 5% over 11.8 km, the Côte de Châtillon (Category 3) with an ascent of 4.9% over 5.1 km, and the Col de Joux-Plane (Highest Level) with an ascent of 8.7% over 11.7 km. It started at St.-Jean-de-Maurienne and ended at Morzine-Avoriaz.

American Floyd Landis put himself back in contention by winning the stage after a 120 km solo breakaway attack, advancing to third place overall. Spaniard Óscar Pereiro finished the stage in seventh place and now leads Carlos Sastre by only 12 seconds.

As is the case with all stage winners, Landis was tested as part of the Tour's standard doping precautions. On 27 July 2006, one week after the stage finished, the Phonak announced that the "A" test on Landis's urine sample had come back "positive" for banned synthetic testosterone as well as a ratio of testosterone to epitestosterone nearly three times the limit allowed by World Anti-Doping Agency rules. On 5 August 2006, the "B" test confirmed the initial findings and Landis was immediately dismissed by the Phonak team. In June 2008, the International Court of Arbitration for Sport dismissed Landis's appeal, disqualifying him from the 2006 Tour de France, and so stripping him of his win and suspending him from the sport for two years.

Stage 17 result

Rank	Rider	Team	Time
DSQ	~~Floyd Landis (USA)~~	~~Phonak~~	~~5h 23' 36"~~
1	Carlos Sastre (ESP)	Team CSC	+ 5' 42"
2	Christophe Moreau (FRA)	AG2R Prévoyance	+ 5' 58"
3	Damiano Cunego (ITA)	Lampre–Fondital	+ 6' 40"
4	Michael Boogerd (NED)	Rabobank	+ 7' 08"
5	Fränk Schleck (LUX)	Team CSC	s.t.
6	Óscar Pereiro (ESP)	Caisse d'Epargne–Illes Balears	s.t.
7	Andreas Klöden (GER)	T-Mobile Team	s.t.
8	Haimar Zubeldia (ESP)	Euskaltel–Euskadi	s.t.
9	Cadel Evans (AUS)	Davitamon–Lotto	+ 7' 20"

General classification after stage 17

Rank	Rider	Team	Time
1	Óscar Pereiro (ESP)	Caisse d'Epargne–Illes Balears	80h 08' 49"
2	Carlos Sastre (ESP)	Team CSC	+ 12"
DSQ	~~Floyd Landis (USA)~~	~~Phonak~~	~~+ 30"~~
3	Andreas Klöden (GER)	T-Mobile Team	+ 2' 29"
4	Cadel Evans (AUS)	Davitamon–Lotto	+ 3' 08"
5	Denis Menchov (RUS)	Rabobank	+ 4' 14"
6	Cyril Dessel (FRA)	AG2R Prévoyance	+ 4' 24"
7	Christophe Moreau (FRA)	AG2R Prévoyance	+ 5' 45"
8	Haimar Zubeldia (ESP)	Euskaltel–Euskadi	+ 8' 16"
9	Michael Rogers (AUS)	T-Mobile Team	+ 12' 13"

== Stage 18 ==
21 July 2006 — Morzine to Mâcon, 197 km (122.4 mi)

This stage had three categorized climbs: the Côte de Châtillon-en-Michaille (Category 3) with an ascent of 3.7% over 5.1 km, the Col du Berthiand (Category 2) with an ascent of 6% over 4.7 km, and the Côte de Chambod (Category 4) with an ascent of 6.4 over 1.9 km. It started at Morzine and ended at Mâcon.

The Italian Matteo Tosatto gave the Quick-Step–Innergetic team their first stage victory, after team leader Tom Boonen dropped out of the Tour in the Alps. Tosatto's compatriot Cristian Moreni took second, while the yellow-jersey wearer Óscar Pereiro coasted along with American Floyd Landis on his tail.

Stage 18 result

Rank	Rider	Team	Time
1	Matteo Tosatto (ITA)	Quick-Step–Innergetic	4h 16' 15"
2	Cristian Moreni (ITA)	Cofidis	s.t.
3	Ronny Scholz (GER)	Gerolsteiner	+ 2"
4	Manuel Quinziato (ITA)	Liquigas	+ 47"
5	Sébastien Hinault (FRA)	Crédit Agricole	+ 1' 03"
6	Jérôme Pineau (FRA)	Bouygues Télécom	s.t.
7	Sylvain Calzati (FRA)	AG2R Prévoyance	s.t.
8	Benoît Vaugrenard (FRA)	Française des Jeux	s.t.
9	Iñaki Isasi (ESP)	Euskaltel–Euskadi	s.t.
10	Egoi Martínez (ESP)	Discovery Channel	s.t.

General classification after stage 18

Rank	Rider	Team	Time
1	Óscar Pereiro (ESP)	Caisse d'Epargne–Illes Balears	84h 33' 04"
2	Carlos Sastre (ESP)	Team CSC	+ 12"
DSQ	~~Floyd Landis (USA)~~	~~Phonak~~	~~+ 30"~~
3	Andreas Klöden (GER)	T-Mobile Team	+ 2' 32"
4	Cadel Evans (AUS)	Davitamon–Lotto	+ 3' 11"
5	Denis Menchov (RUS)	Rabobank	+ 4' 17"
6	Cyril Dessel (FRA)	AG2R Prévoyance	+ 4' 27"
7	Christophe Moreau (FRA)	AG2R Prévoyance	+ 5' 48"
8	Haimar Zubeldia (ESP)	Euskaltel–Euskadi	+ 8' 19"
9	Michael Rogers (AUS)	T-Mobile Team	+ 12' 16"

== Stage 19 ==
22 July 2006 — Le Creusot to Montceau-les-Mines, 57 km (35.4 mi) (ITT)

This was the last time trial of the 2006 Tour de France.

American Floyd Landis put all his rivals behind him in this stage and virtually sealed an unprecedented come-from-behind victory.

Stage 19 result

Rank	Rider	Team	Time
1	Serhiy Honchar (UKR)	T-Mobile Team	1h 07' 45"
2	Andreas Klöden (GER)	T-Mobile Team	+ 40"
DSQ	~~Floyd Landis (USA)~~	~~Phonak~~	~~+ 1' 10"~~
3	Óscar Pereiro (ESP)	Caisse d'Epargne–Illes Balears	+ 2' 39"
4	Sebastian Lang (GER)	Gerolsteiner	+ 3' 18"
5	David Zabriskie (USA)	Team CSC	+ 3' 35"
6	Viatcheslav Ekimov (RUS)	Discovery Channel	+ 3' 41"
7	Cadel Evans (AUS)	Davitamon–Lotto	s.t.
8	Bert Grabsch (GER)	Phonak	+ 3' 43"
9	Damiano Cunego (ITA)	Lampre–Fondital	+ 3' 44"

General classification after stage 19

Rank	Rider	Team	Time
DSQ	~~Floyd Landis (USA)~~	~~Phonak~~	~~42' 30"~~
1	Óscar Pereiro (ESP)	Caisse d'Epargne–Illes Balears	+ 59"
2	Andreas Klöden (GER)	T-Mobile Team	+ 1' 29"
3	Carlos Sastre (ESP)	Team CSC	+ 3' 13"
4	Cadel Evans (AUS)	Davitamon–Lotto	+ 5' 08"
5	Denis Menchov (RUS)	Rabobank	+ 7' 06"
6	Cyril Dessel (FRA)	AG2R Prévoyance	+ 8' 41"
7	Christophe Moreau (FRA)	AG2R Prévoyance	+ 9' 37"
8	Haimar Zubeldia (ESP)	Euskaltel–Euskadi	+ 12' 05"
9	Michael Rogers (AUS)	T-Mobile Team	+ 15' 07"

== Stage 20 ==
23 July 2006 — Sceaux to Paris, 155 km (96.3 mi)

The last stage had two categorized climbs (both Category 4). It started at Sceaux-Antony and ended at Paris on the Champs-Élysées.

As expected after the time trials on Saturday, American Floyd Landis won the 2006 Tour de France, before it was taken away due to doping and handed to eventual winner Óscar Pereiro. Norwegian Thor Hushovd won the stage, edging out Australian sprint champion (and points winner) Robbie McEwen in the dash for the line. This makes Hushovd the first rider to win the first and last stage of the Tour de France in the same year since Bernard Hinault in 1982.

Stage 20 result

Rank	Rider	Team	Time
1	Thor Hushovd (NOR)	Crédit Agricole	3h 56' 52"
2	Robbie McEwen (AUS)	Davitamon–Lotto	s.t.
3	Stuart O'Grady (AUS)	Team CSC	s.t.
4	Erik Zabel (GER)	Team Milram	s.t.
5	Luca Paolini (ITA)	Liquigas	s.t.
6	Samuel Dumoulin (FRA)	AG2R Prévoyance	s.t.
7	Bernhard Eisel (AUT)	Française des Jeux	s.t.
8	Anthony Geslin (FRA)	Bouygues Télécom	s.t.
9	Alessandro Ballan (ITA)	Lampre–Fondital	s.t.
10	Peter Wrolich (AUT)	Gerolsteiner	s.t.

General classification after stage 20

Rank	Rider	Team	Time
DSQ	~~Floyd Landis (USA)~~	~~Phonak~~	~~89h 39' 30"~~
1	Óscar Pereiro (ESP)	Caisse d'Epargne–Illes Balears	+ 57"
2	Andreas Klöden (GER)	T-Mobile Team	+ 1' 29"
3	Carlos Sastre (ESP)	Team CSC	+ 3' 13"
4	Cadel Evans (AUS)	Davitamon–Lotto	+ 5' 08"
5	Denis Menchov (RUS)	Rabobank	+ 7' 36"
6	Cyril Dessel (FRA)	AG2R Prévoyance	+ 8' 41"
7	Christophe Moreau (FRA)	AG2R Prévoyance	+ 9' 37"
8	Haimar Zubeldia (ESP)	Euskaltel–Euskadi	+ 12' 05"
9	Michael Rogers (AUS)	T-Mobile Team	+ 15' 07"
