= 2006 Deutschland Tour =

The 30th edition of the Deutschland Tour road bicycle race took place in Germany from 1 to 9 August 2006. It consisted of a Prologue and eight stages covering a total of 1,390.5 km (864.0 mi), starting in Düsseldorf and finishing in Karlsruhe. Jens Voigt claimed the victory ahead of defending champion Levi Leipheimer.

== Classification tables ==
=== General classification ===
	Cyclist	Country	Team	Time
1	Jens Voigt	Germany	Team CSC	32h 11' 10"
2	Levi Leipheimer	United States	Gerolsteiner	1' 38"
3	Andrey Kashechkin	Kazakhstan	Astana	2' 23"
4	Vladimir Gusev	Russia	Discovery Channel	2' 33"
5	Evgeni Petrov	Russia	Lampre–Fondital	2' 57"
6	Marzio Bruseghin	Italy	Lampre–Fondital	3' 42"
7	Íñigo Cuesta	Spain	Team CSC	4' 08"
8	Stijn Devolder	Belgium	Discovery Channel	4' 09"
9	Eddy Mazzoleni	Italy	T-Mobile Team	4' 36"
10	Pablo Lastras	Spain	Caisse d'Epargne–Illes Balears	4' 38"

=== King of the Mountains Classification ===
	Cyclist	Country	Team	Points
1	Sebastian Lang	Germany	Gerolsteiner	21
2	Andrey Kashechkin	Kazakhstan	Astana	21
3	Jens Voigt	Germany	Team CSC	20

=== Points Classification ===
	Cyclist	Country	Team	Points
1	Erik Zabel	Germany	Team Milram	115
2	Jens Voigt	Germany	Team CSC	88
3	Andrey Kashechkin	Kazakhstan	Astana	62

=== Young Rider Classification ===
	Cyclist	Country	Team	Points
1	Vladimir Gusev	Russia	Discovery Channel	32h 13' 43"
2	Stefan Schumacher	Germany	Gerolsteiner	2' 15"
3	Thomas Dekker	Netherlands	Rabobank	3' 49"

=== Best Team ===
	Team	Country	Time
1	Gerolsteiner	Germany	96h 42' 18"
2	Team CSC	Denmark	13"
3	Discovery Channel	United States	3' 01"

== Stages ==
=== Prologue - Tuesday 1 August: Düsseldorf, 5.5 km. (ITT) ===
Prologue Result

	Cyclist	Country	Team	Time
1	Vladimir Gusev	Russia	Discovery Channel	6' 42"
2	Linus Gerdemann	Germany	T-Mobile Team	s.t.
3	Sebastian Lang	Germany	Gerolsteiner	1"

General classification after Prologue

	Cyclist	Country	Team	Time
1	Vladimir Gusev	Russia	Discovery Channel	6' 42"
2	Linus Gerdemann	Germany	T-Mobile Team	s.t.
3	Sebastian Lang	Germany	Gerolsteiner	1"

=== Stage 1 - Wednesday 2 August: Düsseldorf-Bielefeld, 198 km. ===
Stage 1 Result

	Cyclist	Country	Team	Time
1	Assan Bazayev	Kazakhstan	Astana	4h 43' 06"
2	Danilo Napolitano	Italy	Lampre–Fondital	s.t.
3	Erik Zabel	Germany	Team Milram	s.t.

General classification after Stage 1

	Cyclist	Country	Team	Time
1	Vladimir Gusev	Russia	Discovery Channel	4h 49' 47"
2	Linus Gerdemann	Germany	T-Mobile Team	1"
3	Sebastian Lang	Germany	Gerolsteiner	2"

=== Stage 2 - Thursday 3 August: Minden-Goslar, 181.5 km. ===
Stage 2 Result

	Cyclist	Country	Team	Time
1	Jens Voigt	Germany	Team CSC	4h 22' 25"
2	Davide Rebellin	Italy	Gerolsteiner	s.t.
3	Andrey Kashechkin	Kazakhstan	Astana	s.t.

General classification after Stage 2

	Cyclist	Country	Team	Time
1	Vladimir Gusev	Russia	Discovery Channel	9h 12' 17"
2	Linus Gerdemann	Germany	T-Mobile Team	1"
3	Davide Rebellin	Italy	Gerolsteiner	7"

=== Stage 3 - Friday 4 August: Witzenhausen-Schweinfurt, 203.3 km. ===
Stage 3 Result

	Cyclist	Country	Team	Time
1	Gerald Ciolek	Germany	Team Wiesenof	4h 56' 22"
2	Erik Zabel	Germany	Team Milram	s.t.
3	André Greipel	Germany	T-Mobile Team	s.t.

General classification after Stage 3

	Cyclist	Country	Team	Time
1	Vladimir Gusev	Russia	Discovery Channel	14h 08' 39"
2	Erik Zabel	Germany	Team Milram	s.t.
3	Linus Gerdemann	Germany	T-Mobile Team	1"

=== Stage 4 - Saturday 5 August: Heidenheim-Bad Tölz, 203 km. ===
Stage 4 Result

	Cyclist	Country	Team	Time
1	Graeme Brown	Australia	Rabobank	4h 34' 38"
2	Stefan Schumacher	Germany	Gerolsteiner	s.t.
3	Erik Zabel	Germany	Team Milram	s.t.

General classification after Stage 4

	Cyclist	Country	Team	Time
1	Erik Zabel	Germany	Team Milram	18h 43' 10"
2	Vladimir Gusev	Russia	Discovery Channel	7"
3	Linus Gerdemann	Germany	T-Mobile Team	8"

=== Stage 5 - Sunday 6 August: Bad Tölz-Seefeld, 192.1 km. ===
Because of bad weather on top of Mount Kühtai (Top of the Deutschland Tour 2006 at 2017 meters), the riders asked the organisation before the start to remove it from the Stage, which they did. As a result, the stage was only 160 kilometres long.

Stage 5 Result

	Cyclist	Country	Team	Time
1	Levi Leipheimer	United States	Gerolsteiner	3h 44' 20"
2	Andrey Kashechkin	Kazakhstan	Astana	3"
3	Marzio Bruseghin	Italy	Lampre–Fondital	3"

General classification after Stage 5

	Cyclist	Country	Team	Time
1	Jens Voigt	Germany	Team CSC	22h 27' 51"
2	Vladimir Gusev	Russia	Discovery Channel	3"
3	Marzio Bruseghin	Italy	Lampre–Fondital	15"

=== Stage 6 - Monday 7 August: Seefeld-St Anton am Arlberg, 196.6 km. ===
Stage 6 Result

	Cyclist	Country	Team	Time
1	Jens Voigt	Germany	Team CSC	5h 11' 48"
2	Levi Leipheimer	United States	Gerolsteiner	2"
3	Andrey Kashechkin	Kazakhstan	Astana	8"

General classification after Stage 6

	Cyclist	Country	Team	Time
1	Jens Voigt	Germany	Team CSC	27h 39' 29"
2	Levi Leipheimer	United States	Gerolsteiner	24"
3	Evgeni Petrov	Russia	Lampre–Fondital	56"

=== Stage 7 - Tuesday 8 August: Bad Säckingen, 38.2 km. (ITT) ===
Stage 7 Result

	Cyclist	Country	Team	Time
1	Jens Voigt	Germany	Team CSC	45' 03"
2	László Bodrogi	Hungary	Crédit Agricole	1' 03"
3	Sebastian Lang	Germany	Gerolsteiner	1' 04"

General classification after Stage 7

	Cyclist	Country	Team	Time
1	Jens Voigt	Germany	Team CSC	28h 24' 32"
2	Levi Leipheimer	United States	Gerolsteiner	1' 38"
3	Andrey Kashechkin	Kazakhstan	Astana	2' 23"

=== Stage 8 - Wednesday 9 August: Bad Krozingen-Karlsruhe, 172.1 km. ===
Stage 8 Result

	Cyclist	Country	Team	Time
1	Graeme Brown	Australia	Rabobank	3h 46' 38"
2	Erik Zabel	Germany	Team Milram	s.t.
3	Danilo Napolitano	Italy	Lampre–Fondital	s.t.

General classification after Stage 8

	Cyclist	Country	Team	Time
1	Jens Voigt	Germany	Team CSC	32h 11' 10"
2	Levi Leipheimer	United States	Gerolsteiner	1' 38"
3	Andrey Kashechkin	Kazakhstan	Astana	2' 23"

=== Jersey progress ===
Stage (Winner)	General classification (Gelbes Trikot)	Points Classification (Rotes Trikot)	Climber Classification (Bergtrikot)	Young Rider Classification (Weißes Trikot)	Team Classification	Most Active (Aktivster Fahrer)
Prologue (Vladimir Gusev)	Vladimir Gusev	Vladimir Gusev	Vladimir Gusev	Vladimir Gusev	Discovery Channel	No award
Stage 1 (Assan Bazayev)	Vladimir Gusev	Vladimir Gusev	Stefan Schumacher	Vladimir Gusev	Discovery Channel	Andreas Matzbacher
Stage 2 (Jens Voigt)	Vladimir Gusev	Vladimir Gusev	Davide Rebellin	Vladimir Gusev	Gerolsteiner	Ronny Scholz
Stage 3 (Gerald Ciolek)	Vladimir Gusev	Erik Zabel	Stefan Schumacher	Vladimir Gusev	Gerolsteiner	Marco Pinotti
Stage 4 (Graeme Brown)	Erik Zabel	Erik Zabel	Stefan Schumacher	Vladimir Gusev	Gerolsteiner	Marcel Sieberg
Stage 5 (Levi Leipheimer)	Jens Voigt	Erik Zabel	Andrey Kashechkin	Vladimir Gusev	Team CSC	Sven Teutenberg
Stage 6 (Jens Voigt)	Jens Voigt	Erik Zabel	Sebastian Lang	Vladimir Gusev	Team CSC	Erik Zabel
Stage 7 (Jens Voigt)	Jens Voigt	Erik Zabel	Sebastian Lang	Vladimir Gusev	Gerolsteiner	No award
Stage 8 (Graeme Brown)	Jens Voigt	Erik Zabel	Sebastian Lang	Vladimir Gusev	Gerolsteiner	No award
Final	Jens Voigt	Erik Zabel	Sebastian Lang	Vladimir Gusev	Gerolsteiner	
