= Ludovic Martin =

French cyclist

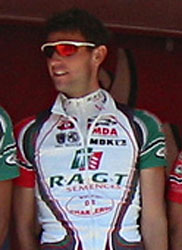
- Martin in 2005

Personal information
- Full name: Ludovic Martin
- Born: 17 March 1976 (age 50) Mantes-la-Jolie

Cycling career
- Sport: Cycling
- Current team: Retired
- Discipline: Road
- Role: Rider

Professional teams
- 2000-2002: Crédit Agricole
- 2003-2005: R.A.G.T. Semences
- 2007: Storez Ledecq Materials

Ludovic Martin (born 17 March 1976 in Mantes-la-Jolie) is a retired French cyclist. He participated in the 2004 Tour de France and finished in 119th. His sporting career began with Jeunesse Sportive Doloise.

== Major results ==
1998
2nd Paris-Mantes-en-Yvelines
2000
1st stage 4 Tour de Bretagne Cycliste
1st Manche-Ocean
2006
1st Tour Nivernais Morvan
2nd Polymultipliée Lyon
1st Tour du Gévaudan Languedoc-Roussillon
