= Jörg Ludewig =

German cyclist (born 1975)

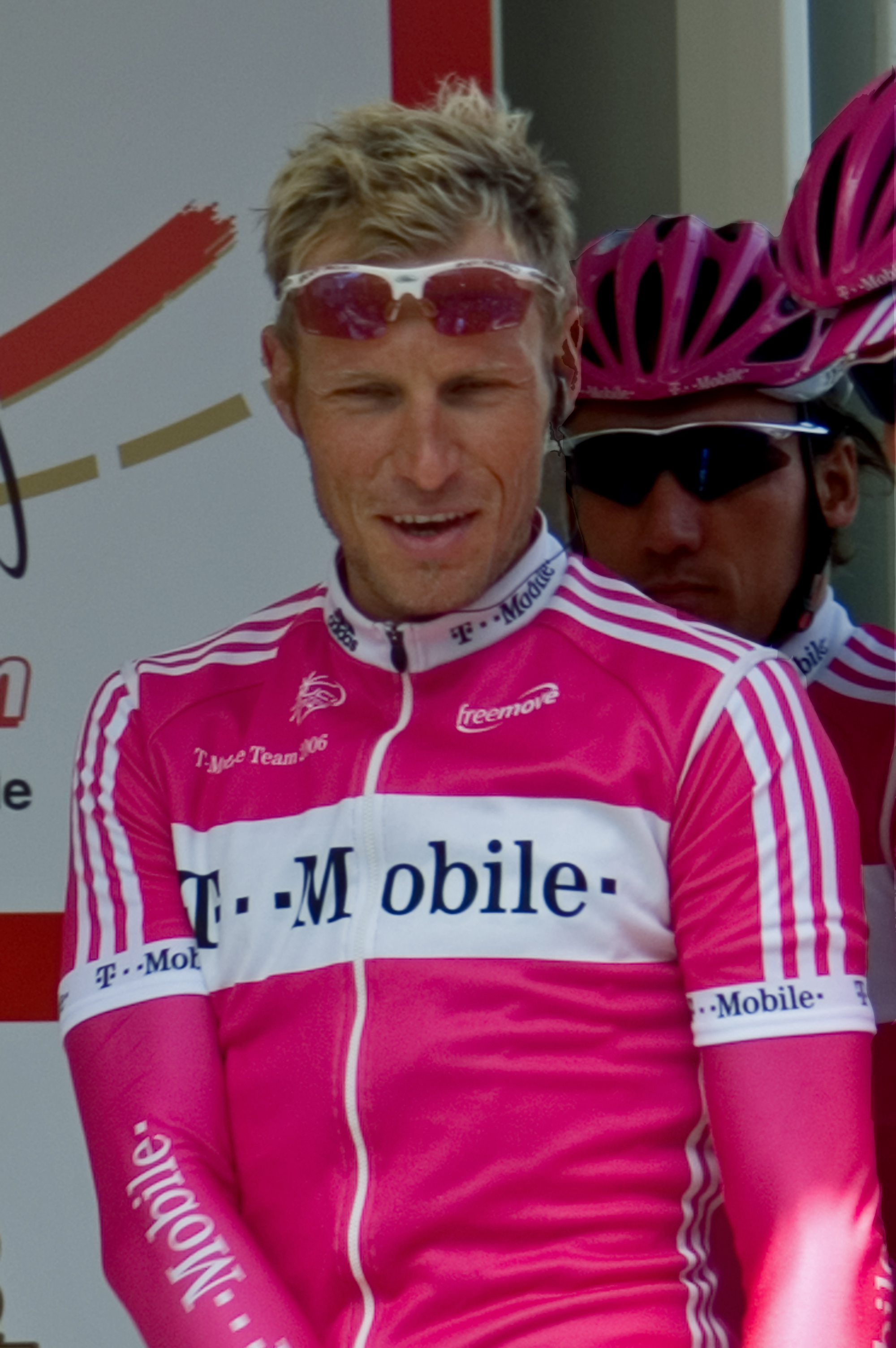

Personal information
- Born: 9 September 1975 (age 51) Halle, North Rhine-Westphalia

Cycling career
- Sport: Cycling
- Current team: Retired
- Discipline: Road
- Role: Rider
- Rider type: Domestique; Sprinter

Amateur team
- 1997–1998: EC Bayer

Professional teams
- 1999: Gerolsteiner
- 2000–2004: Saeco–Valli & Valli
- 2005: Naturino–Sapore di Mare
- 2006: T-Mobile Team
- 2007: Wiesenhof–Felt

Jörg Ludewig (born 9 September 1975 in Halle, North Rhine-Westphalia) is a German former road cyclist. Ludewig turned professional in 1997, with the Gerolsteiner team. He became a typical "bottlebringer" and teamrider while doing several "grand tours", including 3 editions of the Tour de France.

In August 2006, Ludewig was suspended from the T-Mobile Team for some races due to doping discussions, and a letter where Ludewig informed himself regarding substances being used in the sports-world.

He raced in Steinhagen, his last race in 2006, and signed a contract with Wiesenhof–Felt for 2007.

After being a Pro Rider, Ludewig became head of sales at lightweight.info while taking care of a hobbyteam of freetime-riders. He switched to the Dr. Wolff group in 2015 as a sports marketing manager. His daughter was born in January 2015.

== Career achievements ==
=== Major results ===
1998
3rd Rund um Düren
10th Overall Tour de Serbie
1999
7th Overall Tour de l'Avenir

1st Stage 1

2nd Overall Course de Solidarność et des Champions Olympiques

1st Stage 6

2000
7th Rund um Düren
2001
7th Overall Bayern Rundfahrt

1st Stage 1

7th Overall Tour de Langkawi
2003
5th Road race, National Road Championships
2004
4th Overall Hessen Rundfahrt
2005
3rd GP Triberg-Schwarzwald
4th Sparkassen Giro Bochum
9th Rund um die Hainleite
2007
5th Road race, National Road Championships
9th Overall Tour of Qinghai Lake

1st Stage 4

=== Grand Tour general classification results timeline ===
Grand Tour	2000	2001	2002	2003	2004	2005	2006
Giro d'Italia	—	—	—	—	—	—	51
Tour de France	—	—	—	38	55	38	—
Vuelta a España	DNF	85	—	—	—	—	—

Legend
—	Did not compete
DNF	Did not finish
