= Massimo Giunti =

Italian cyclist

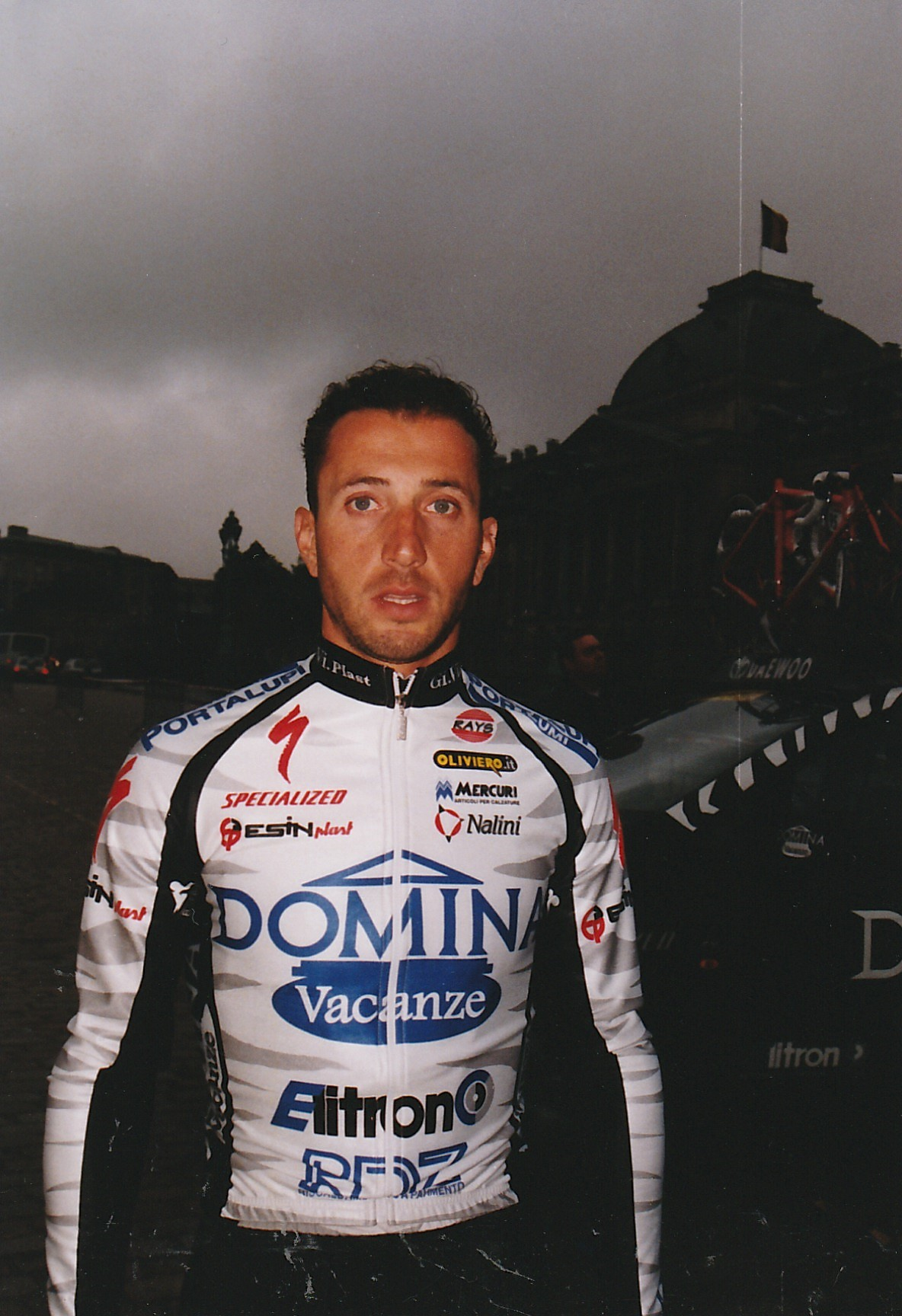

Personal information
- Born: July 29, 1974 (age 52) Pesaro

Cycling career
- Sport: Cycling
- Current team: Retired
- Discipline: Road
- Role: Rider

Professional teams
- 1998–2001: Cantina Tollo
- 2002: Acqua & Sapone
- 2003–2004: Domina Vacanze
- 2005: Fassa Bortolo
- 2006: Naturino-Sapore di Mare
- 2007–2009: Miche-Guerciotti
- 2010: Androni Giocattoli

Massimo Giunti (born 29 July 1974, in Pesaro) is a former Italian cyclist. He tested positive for EPO in March 2010.

== Palmares ==
2002
3rd Coppa Ugo Agostoni
3rd San Francisco Grand Prix
2003
2nd Giro di Toscana
2nd Coppa Bernocchi
2004
5th Tour Down Under
3rd Giro del Veneto
2005
3rd Italian National Road Race Championships
2007
2nd Route du Sud
3rd Tour of Bulgaria
2008
5th Tour Méditerranéen Cycliste Professionnel
4th Trofeo Melinda
2009
4th Giro dell'Appennino
3rd Gran Premio Città di Camaiore
3rd Settimana Internazionale di Coppi e Bartali
