= Francis van Londersele =

French directeur sportif

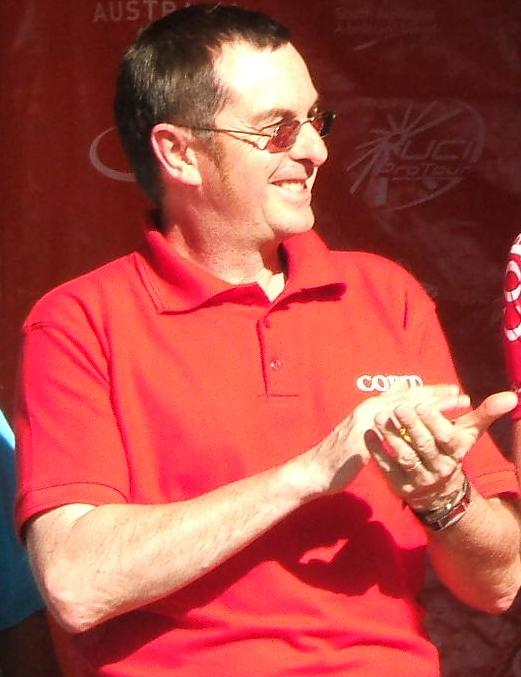
Francis van Londersele

Francis van Londersele (born 6 July 1953 in Montataire) is a directeur sportif with the Cofidis cycling team. He began cycling in his youth encouraged by his father, competing regionally but never reaching the professional ranks. He left cycling temporarily to work in the industrial sector. Returning to the sport in 1982, he became the technical regional adviser for the Picardy region in 1985, founding a sports-study center in Amiens that introduced new training methods.

In 1994, he joined Cyrille Guimard's Castorama team, then worked with Gan from 1995-1996, implementing personalized training and nutritional monitoring programs previously unseen in the team. He followed Guimard to the newly formed Cofidis team in 1997, rising from coach to assistant sports director in 1998 and then full sports director from 2002.

During the 2003 Tour de France, after leader David Millar encountered a technical issue, Van Londersele took sole charge of team logistics and management. After Eric Boyer arrived as general manager in 2005, logistics were delegated but Van Londersele remained sports director until 2010.

In 2012, he co-founded L&H Cycling, an association for finding sponsors to establish a professional cycling team. He contributed technically to Roubaix Lille Métropole from 2013 to 2014 before leaving the position. His career is noted for pioneering personalized coaching, diet management, and the creation of specialized sports-study centers, aiming to improve team performance through innovation in training and athlete care.
