= Carlos Da Cruz =

French cyclist (born 1974)

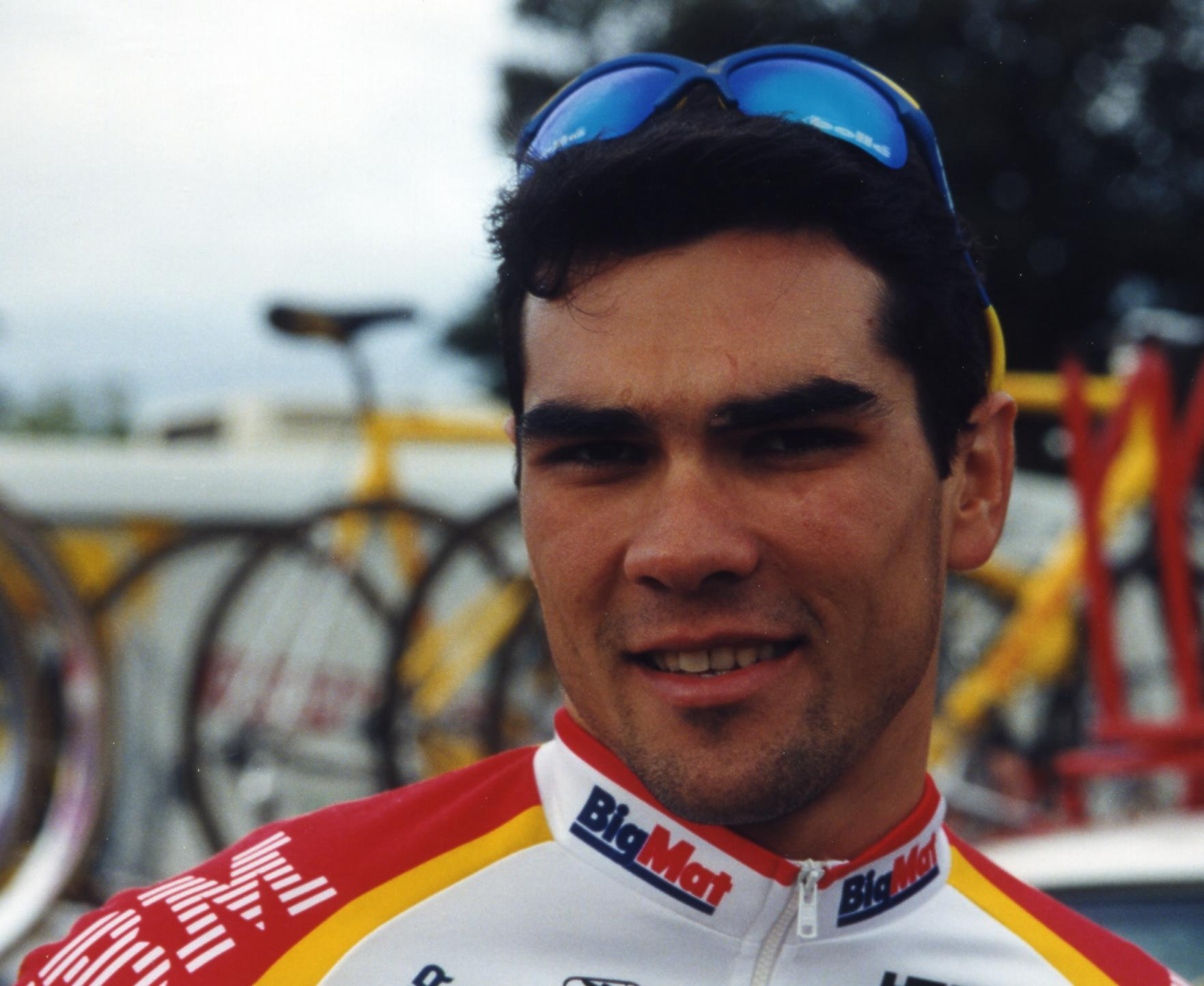

Personal information
- Full name: Carlos Da Cruz
- Born: 20 December 1974 (age 51) Paris, France
- Height: 1.82 m (6 ft 0 in)
- Weight: 74 kg (163 lb)

Cycling career
- Sport: Cycling
- Discipline: Road
- Role: Rider

Professional teams
- 1997–2000: BigMat–Auber 93
- 2001: Festina
- 2002–2007: Française des Jeux

Major wins
- Circuit de la Sarthe (2003)

Carlos Da Cruz (born 20 December 1974 in Paris) is a French former professional road bicycle racer. In his 11-year career, he rode for BigMat-Auber93 between 1997 and 2000, Festina in 2001 and then for UCI ProTeam Française des Jeux between 2002 and 2007.

== Major results ==
- Circuit de la Sarthe - 1 stage & Overall (2003)
- Settimana Lombarda - 1 stage (2000)
- (bronze) World Team Pursuit Championship (1997)
- France Amateur Team Pursuit Champion (1995)
