= Ronny Scholz =

German professional road racing cyclist

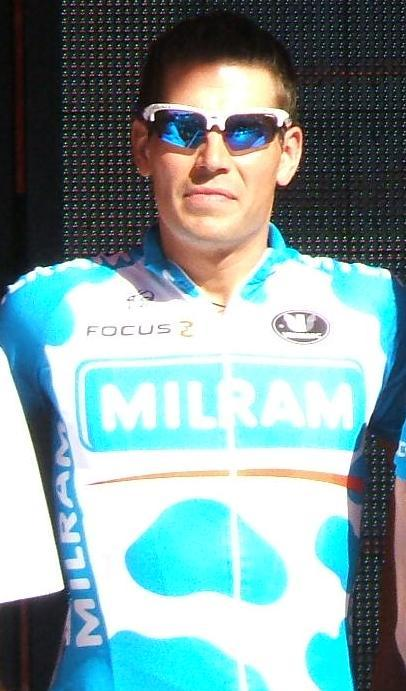

Personal information
- Full name: Ronny Scholz
- Born: 24 April 1978 (age 48) Forst, Bezirk Cottbus, East Germany
- Height: 1.76 m (5 ft 9 in)
- Weight: 60 kg (132 lb)

Cycling career
- Sport: Cycling
- Discipline: Road
- Role: Rider

Amateur teams
- RSV Peitz
- RSC Cottbus
- ISPO Lotusan Cottbus

Professional teams
- 2001–2008: Gerolsteiner
- 2009: Team Milram

Ronny Scholz (born 24 April 1978, in Forst) is a former professional road racing cyclist from Germany who retired after the 2009 season.

== Career achievements ==
=== Major results ===
2002
Internationale Rheinland
2003
Internationalen Niedersachsen-Rundfahrt, stage 2
Regio-Tour International, stage 2
2005
1 Rund um die Nürnberger Altstadt
2006
Stage 2, Most Active Rider Award, Deutschland Tour

=== Tour de France Participations ===
- 2004 - 53rd overall
- 2005 - 91st overall
- 2006 - 96th overall
