= Peter Wrolich =

Austrian cyclist

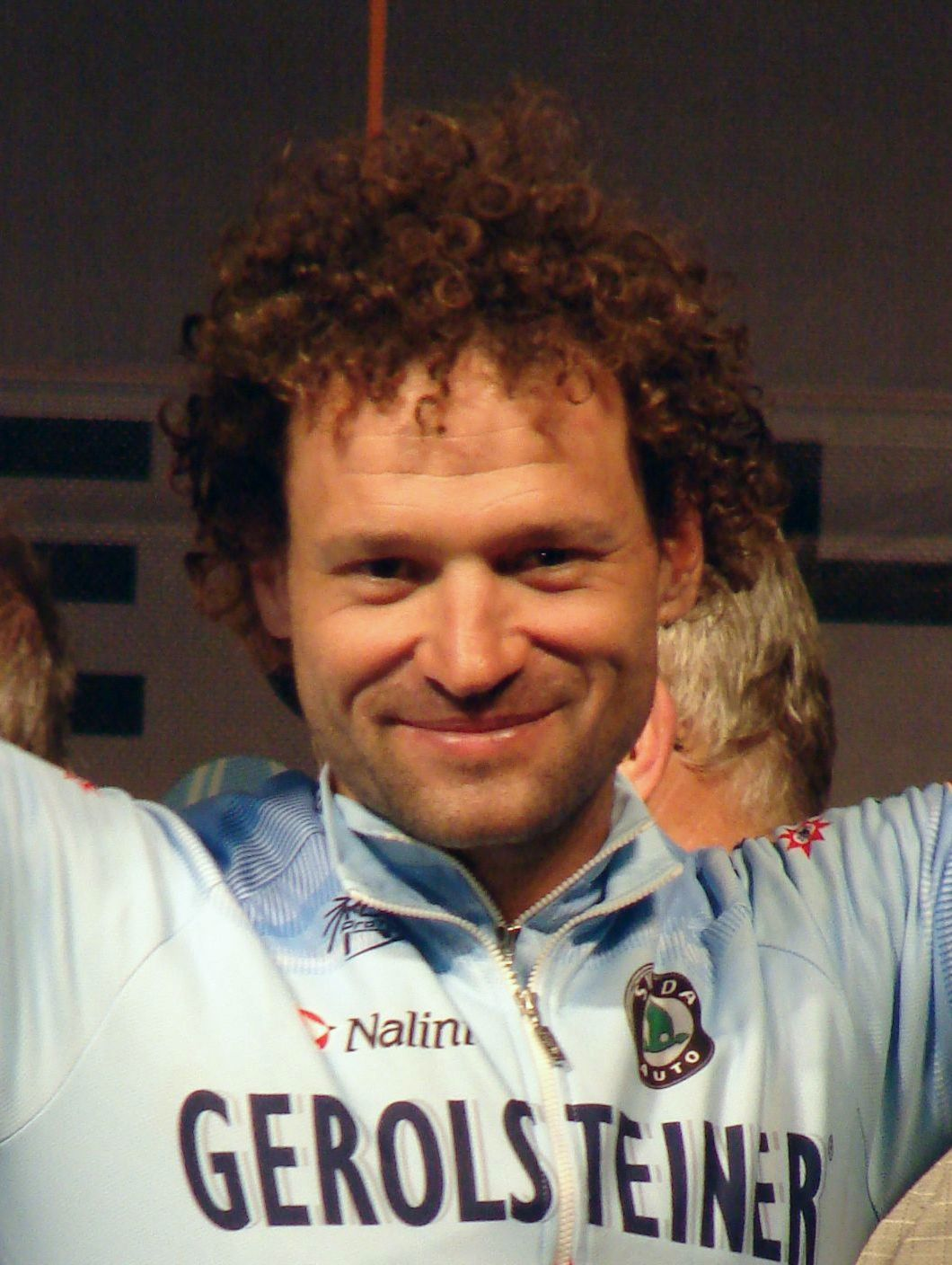
- Wrolich in August 2007

Personal information
- Full name: Peter Wrolich
- Born: 30 May 1974 (age 52) Vienna, Austria

Cycling career
- Sport: Cycling
- Current team: Retired
- Discipline: Road
- Role: Rider

Professional teams
- 1999–2008: Gerolsteiner
- 2009–2010: Team Milram

Major wins
- Herald Sun Tour (2001); Rund um Köln (2002)

Peter Wrolich (born 30 May 1974) is a retired Austrian professional road bicycle racer. He is Slovenian from Austria. He was known as a sprinter. He was in the top 10 of the last stage of the 2006 Tour de France, with a total of 65 points.

== Major results ==
2002
Rund um Köln
Sachsen-Tour International, stage 5
2004
Rund um die Hainleite
2005
Tour de Georgia, stage 2
