= Sebastian Lang =

German road bicycle racer

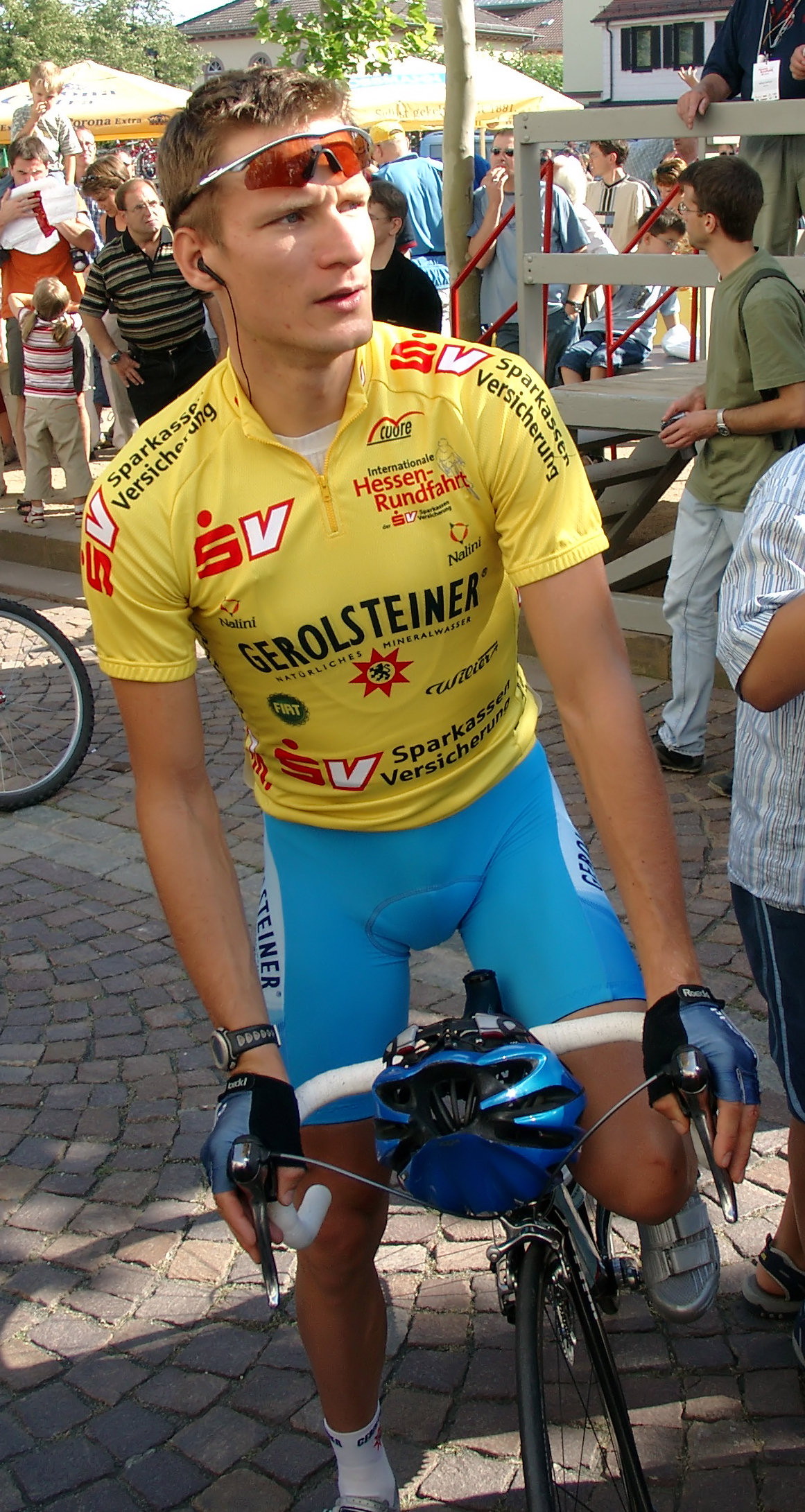
- Lang in 2004

Personal information
- Full name: Sebastian Lang
- Born: 15 September 1979 (age 47) Sonneberg, East Germany
- Height: 1.87 m (6 ft 2 in)
- Weight: 75 kg (165 lb)

Cycling career
- Sport: Cycling
- Current team: Retired
- Discipline: Road
- Role: Rider
- Rider type: Time trialist

Professional teams
- 2002–2008: Gerolsteiner
- 2009–2011: Silence–Lotto

Major wins
- 3-Länder-Tour (2006); National Time Trial Champion (2006); Hessen-Rundfahrt (2004); Danmark Rundt (2003); Karlsruheversicherungs GP (2003)

Sebastian Lang (born 15 September 1979 in Sonneberg) is a former German professional road bicycle racer and time trialist, who rode as a professional between 2002 and 2011. He rode on Gerolsteiner from 2002 until its demise in 2008, and in 2006 became Germany's national time trial champion.

In the 2008 Tour de France, on stage 9, Lang broke from the peloton 22 kilometers into the stage. He shook off his two breakaway companions on the category 1 col de Peyresourde, with another big difficulty to come, the col d'Aspin. He was passed on the latter by Riccardo Riccò, who would win the stage only be excluded from the Tour later on for a positive test to the blood booster CERA. With his long break, Lang earned the most combative award for the stage, and raked in points for the best climber jersey, which he would wear from stages 12 to 14.

In 2011, Lang started and finished all three Grand Tours for Omega Pharma–Lotto, only the 31st rider to achieve this feat. He retired at the end of that season, aged 32.

== Major results ==
2000
3rd Time trial, National Road Championships
2001
2nd Time trial, Under-23 World Road Championships
2002
Rheinland-Pfalz Rundfahrt

1st Stages 1 & 4

2003
1st Overall Danmark Rundt
1st Karlsruheversicherungs GP
2nd Overall Tour of Rhodes

1st Prologue

3rd Time trial, National Road Championships
2004
1st Overall Hessen Rundfahrt

1st Stage 4
1st Young rider classification

3rd Chrono des Nations
2005
1st Stage 5 Hessen Rundfahrt
8th Time trial, UCI Road World Championships
2006
1st Time trial, National Road Championships
1st LuK Challenge Chrono (Time trial with Markus Fothen)
1st Overall 3-Länder-Tour

1st Stage 3 (ITT)

5th Time trial, UCI Road World Championships
2007
5th Time trial, UCI Road World Championships
2008
Tour de France

Held King of the Mountains after Stages 12–14,
Combativity award Stage 9

=== Grand Tour general classification results timeline ===
Grand Tour	2004	2005	2006	2007	2008	2009	2010	2011
Giro d'Italia	—	—	—	—	—	—	71	56
Tour de France	78	65	65	—	73	76	80	113
Vuelta a España	—	—	—	—	79	—	—	77

Legend
—	Did not compete
DNF	Did not finish
