= Gerolsteiner (cycling team) =

German road bicycle racing team

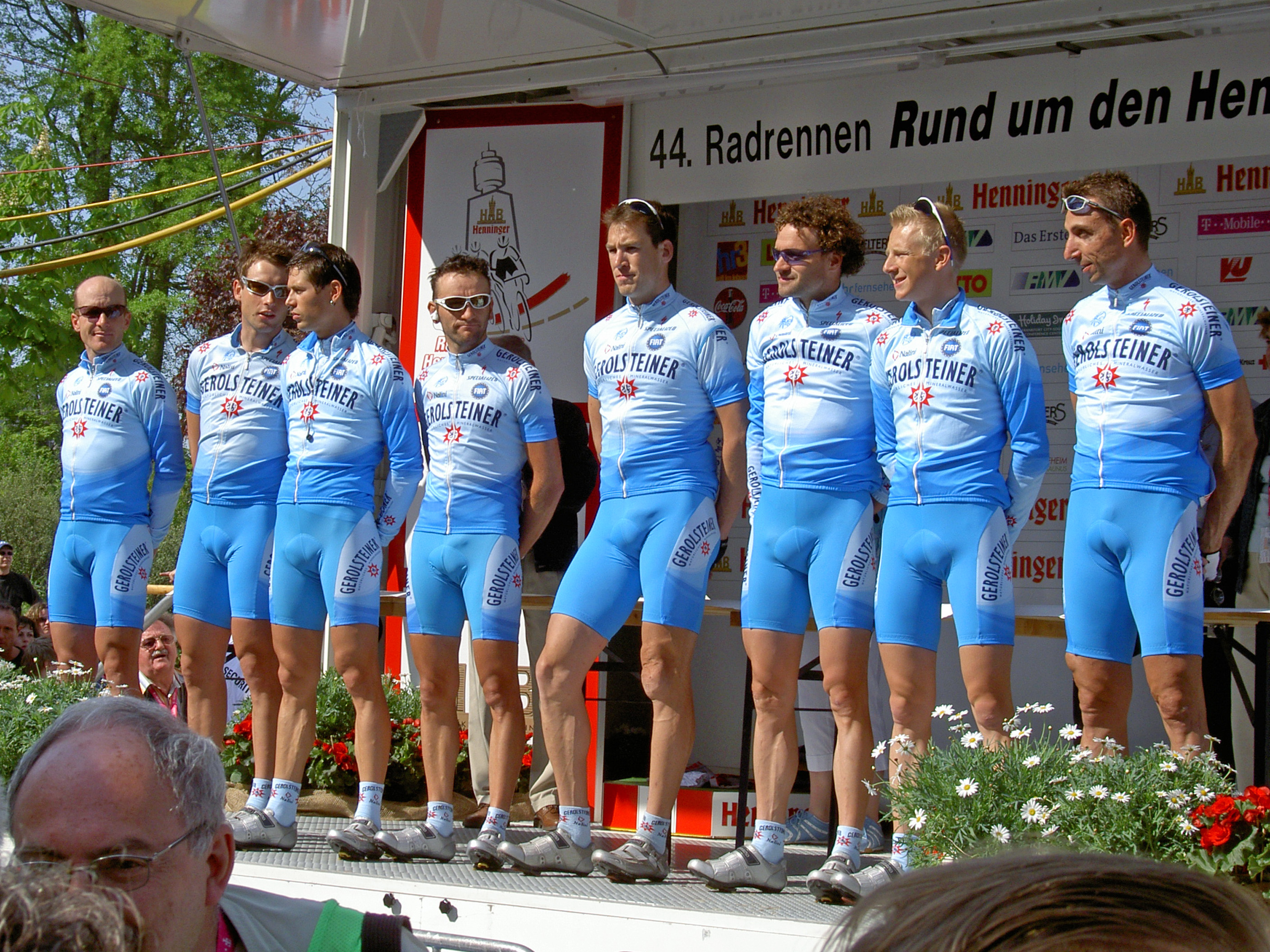
- The squad of the 2005 Rund um den Henninger-Turm

Team information
- UCI code: GST
- Registered: Germany
- Founded: 1997
- Disbanded: 2008
- Discipline: Road
- Status: ProTour

Key personnel
- General manager: Reimund Dietzen

Team name history
- 1997–1998 1999–2008: Schauff Oeschelbronn; Gerolsteiner
Gerolsteiner jersey
Jersey

Gerolsteiner (UCI team code: GST) was a German road bicycle racing team in the UCI ProTour. It was sponsored by the mineral water company Gerolsteiner Brunnen and Specialized.

== History ==
The team was founded in 1997 as Schauff Oeschelbronn professional cycling team by team manager Hans-Michael Holczer and sports directors Rolf Gölz and Christian Henn. In 1999 Gerolsteiner who had previously sponsored the Cologne Cycling Team in 1998 became the title sponsors. The contract with Georg Totschnig in 2001 helped make the team enter Division I. In 2003 the team participated in the Tour de France for the first time.

The leader for several seasons was Georg Totschnig, who recorded top 10 finishes in the Tour de France and was an excellent climber. In 2005, Totschnig won stage 14 of the Tour, showing his skill on the 15 km long climb up the Port de Pailhères (2000m at 8.2%). He was overfilled with emotion, after becoming the first Austrian to win a tour stage since Max Bulla in 1931, who won 3 stages.

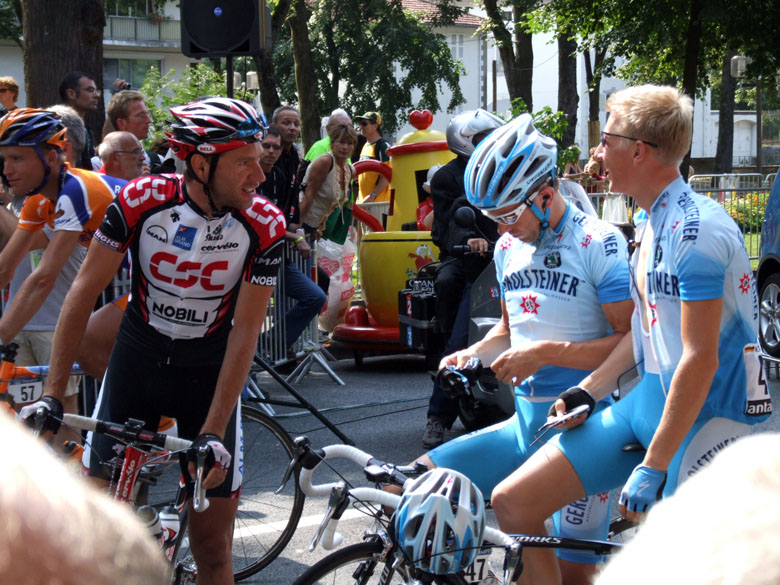
Team Gerolsteiner riders with CSC rider Jens Voigt during the 2006 Tour de France

In 2007, with former riders Georg Totschnig (retired) and Levi Leipheimer (left for Discovery Channel Pro Cycling Team) gone, the team turned to youngsters Markus Fothen and Stefan Schumacher to captain the team in the 2007 Tour de France.

The team announced in September 2007 that Gerolsteiner will not be renewing its sponsorship agreement at the end of the 2008 season. In August 2008 the team confirmed it will dissolve after the 2008 season, after being unable to find a new sponsor.

In October 2008, riders Stefan Schumacher and Bernhard Kohl were tested positive for CERA (continuous erythropoitin receptor activator, a third-generation variant of erythropoietin, aka EPO).

== Major wins ==
1998
Hel van het Mergelland, Raymond Meijs

1999
Slovenia National Time Trial, Branko Filip
Germany National Time Trial, Andreas Walzer
Stage 5 Bayern-Rundfahrt, Scott McGrory
Points classification Bayern-Rundfahrt Scott McGrory

2000
Austria National Time Trial, René Haselbacher
Germany National Time Trial, Michael Rich
Norway National Time Trial, Sveln Gaute Holestol
Giro del Lago Maggiore, Tobias Steinhauser
Tour de la Somme, Michael Rich
International Niedersachsen-Rundfahrt, Torsten Schmidt
Stage 1a Bayern-Rundfahrt, Sven Teutenberg
Stage 1b Bayern-Rundfahrt, Michael Rich
Madison Cycling at the 2000 Summer Olympics, Scott McGrory

2001
Austria National Time Trial, Georg Totscnhig
Overall Jayco Herald Sun Tour, Peter Wrolich
Rund um die Nürnberger Altstadt, Olaf Pollack
Stage 1a International Niedersachsen-Rundfahrt, Michael Rich
Stage 3 Rothaus Regio-Tour International, Saulius Ruskys
Stage 4 International Rheinland-Pfalz Rundfahrt, Torsten Schmidt

2002
Austria National Road Race, René Haselbacher
Austria National Time Trial, Georg Totscnhig
Germany National Time Trial, Uwe Peschel
Chrono des Herbiers, Michael Rich
Groningen-Münster, Olaf Pollack
International Hessen Rundfahrt, Uwe Peschel
GP Città´ di Camaiore, Davide Rebellin
Rund um Köln, Peter Wrolich
Overall International Niedersachsen-Rundfahrt, Olaf Pollack

Stage 2, Olaf Pollack
Stage 3, Olaf Pollack
Stage 4b, Michael Rich

Overall Bayern-Rundfahrt, Michael Rich

Stage 2 Michael Rich

Grand Prix des Nations, Uwe Peschel
Rheinland-Pfalz Rundfahrt, Ronny Scholz

Stage 1, Sebastian Lang
Stage 4, Sebastian Lang

Stage 2 KBC Driedaagse van De Panne, Saulius Ruskys
Stage 4 Deutschland Tour, Michael Rich
Stage 3 Tour of Sweden, René Haselbacher
Stage 9 Tour of Sweden, Tobias Steinhauser
Stage 5 Tour of Denmark, Olaf Pollack
Stage 4 Tour du Poitou Charentes et de la Vienne, Michael Rich

2003
Austria National Road Race, Georg Totschnig
Germany National Time Trial, Michael Rich
Chrono des Herbiers, Michael Rich
Groningen-Münster, Robert Forster
GP Città di Rio Saliceto e Correggio, Fabian Wegmann
Sachsen-Tour International, Fabian Wegmann
Rund um den Finanzplatz Eschborn-Frankfurt, Davide Rebellin
Bayern-Rundfahrt, Michael Rich

Stage 2, Michael Rich

Overall Tour of Denmark, Sebatian Lang
Grand Prix des Nations, Michael Rich
GP Industria & Commercio di Prato, Davide Rebellin
Stage 2 Paris - Nice, Davide Rebellin
Stage 1a International Niedersachsen-Rundfahrt, Michael Rich
Stage 2 International Niedersachsen-Rundfahrt, Ronny Scholz
Stage 5 International Niedersachsen-Rundfahrt, Olaf Pollack
Stage 6 International Niedersachsen-Rundfahrt U23, Sven Krauss
Stage 7 Deutschland Tour, Olad Pollack
Stage 2b Rothaus Regio-Tour, Ronny Scholz
Stage 1 International Rheinland-Pfalz Rundfahrt, Robert Forster
Stage 5 International Rheinland-Pfalz Rundfahrt, René Haselbacher

2004
Austria National Time Trial, Georg Totschnig
Germany National Time Trial, Michael Rich
Groningen-Münster, Robert Forster
Amstel Gold, Davide Rebellin
La Flèche Wallonne, Davide Rebellin
Liège - Bastogne - Liège, Davide Rebellin
Rund um die Hainleite, Peter Wrolich
Tre Valli Varesine, Fabian Wegmann
GP Schwarzwald, Markus Fothen
Trofeo Melinda, Davide Rebellin
Overall International Hessen Rundfahrt, Sebastien Lang

Stage 3, Sebastian Land
Stage 4, Michael Rich

Grand Prix des Nations, Michael Rich
G.P. Beghelli, Danilo Hondo
Stage 2 Setmana Catalana de Ciclisme, Beat Zberg
Stage 1 KBC Driedaagse van De Panne - Koksijde, Danilo Hondo
Stage 2 Vuelta Ciclista al Pais Vasco, Beat Zberg
Stage 1 International Niedersachsen-Rundfahrt, Danilo Hondo
Stage 2 International Niedersachsen-Rundfahrt, Danilo Hondo
Stage 4 International Niedersachsen-Rundfahrt, Danilo Hondo
Stage 5 International Niedersachsen-Rundfahrt, Danilo Hondo
Stage 5 4 Days of Dunkirk, Danilo Hondo
Stage 3 Bayern-Rundfahrt, Michael Rich
Stage 1 Deutschland Tour, Michael Rich
Stage 7 Tour de Suisse, Georg Totschnig
Stage 5 Volta Ciclista a Catalunya, Danilo Hondo
Stage 1 Tour du Poitou Charentes et de la Vienne, Danilo Hondo
Stage 4 Rheinland-Pfalz Rundfahrt, Torsten Schmidt

2005
Germany National Time Trial, Michael Rich
Overall Bayern-Rundfahrt, Michael Rich
GP Schwarzwald, Fabian Wegmann
Overall Deutschland Tour, Levi Leipheimer

Stage 4, Levi Leipheimer

San Francisco Grand Prix, Fabian Wegmann
Stuttgart - Strassburg, Michael Muck
Rund um die Nürnberger Altstadt, Fabian Wegmann
Stage 2 Tour de Georgia, Peter Wrolich
Stage 4 International Niedersachsen-Rundfahrt, Robert Forster
Stage 2 Ster Elektrotoer, Michael Rich
Stage 14 Tour de France, Georg Totschnig
Stage 1 Brixia Tour, Davide Rebellin
Stage 4 Rothaus Regio-Tour International, Tony Martin
Stage 5 Rothaus Regio-Tour International, Sven Krauss
Stage 5 International Hessen Rundfahrt, Sebastian Lang
Stage 19 Vuelta a España, Heinrich Haussler
Stage 5 Tour de Pologne, Fabian Wegmann
Stage 3 Circuit Franco-Belge, Frank Hoj
Eindhoven Team Time Trial

2006
Germany National Time Trial, Sebatian Lang
Trofeo Calvia, David Kopp
GP Miguel Indurain, Fabian Wegmann
Overall Circuit Cycliste Sarthe - Pays de la Loire, Stefan Schumacher

Stage 1, Robert Forster

Overall International Rheinland-Pfalz Rundfahrt, René Haselbacher

Stage 2, René Haselbacher

GP Kanton Aargau, Beat Zberg
Overall Critérium du Dauphiné, Levi Leipheimer

Stage 1, Fabian Wegmann

Trophée des Champions, Johannes Frohlinger
Overall Brixia Tour, Davide Rebellin

Stage 1, Davide Rebellin

City Nacht Rhede, Fabian Wegmann
Wiesbauer Rathauskriterium Wien, René Haselbacher
Overall ENECO Tour, Stefan Schumacher

Prologue, Stefan Schumacher
Stage 6, David Kopp

Overall Tour de Pologne, Stefan Schumacher

Stage 6, Stefan Schumacher
Stage 7, Stefan Schumacher

Overall International Hessen Rundfahrt, Sebastien Lang

Stage 3, Sebastian Lang

Giro dell´Emilia, Davide Rebellin
Prologue Tour of California, Levi Leipheimer
Stage 1 Vuelta Ciclista a Murcia - Costa Calida, Heinrich Haussler
Stage 5 Vuelta Ciclista a Murcia - Costa Calida, Heinrich Haussler
Stage 7 Paris - Nice, Markus Zberg
Stage 3 Giro d'Italia, Stefan Schumacher
Stage 18 Giro d'Italia, Stefan Schumacher
Stage 21 Giro d'Italia, Robert Förster
Stage 5 Ster Elektrotoer, Robert Förster
Stage 4 Sachsen-Tour International, Stefan Schumacher
Stage 3 Tour of Denmark, Robert Förster
Stage 6 Tour of Denmark, Robert Förster
Team classification, Deutschland Tour

Stage 5, Levi Leipheimer

Stage 2 Rothaus Regio-Tour International, Matthias Russ
Stage 5 Rothaus Regio-Tour International, Torsten Hiekmann
Stage 15 Vuelta a España, Robert Förster
Stage 2 Circuit Franco-Belge, Heinrich Haussler
Stage 4 Circuit Franco-Belge, Heinrich Haussler
Team classification, 2006 Deutschland Tour

2007
Switzerland National Road Race, Beat Zberg
Germany National Road Race, Fabian Wegmann
Amstel Gold Race, Stefan Schumacher
La Flèche Wallonne, Davide Rebellin
GP Buchholz, Fabian Wegmann
Overall Bayern-Rundfahrt, Stefan Schumacher

Stage 4, Stefan Schumacher

Wiedenbrücker Nacht, David Kopp
Overall Brixia Tour, Davide Rebellin

Stage 1, Davide Rebellin

Tour de Nüss, Fabian Wegmann
Rund um die Nürnberger Altstadt, Fabian Wegmann
Stage 5 Tirreno - Adriatico, Stefan Schumacher
Stage 4 Settimana Ciclistica Internazionale, Robert Förster
Stage 5 International Niedersachsen-Rundfahrt, Heinrich Haussler
Stage 1 Tour de Romanide, Markus Fothen
Stage 5 Giro d'Italia, Robert Förster
Stage 1 Critérium du Dauphiné, Heinrich Haussler
Stage 1 Deutschland Tour, Robert Förster
Stage 1 Tour de l´Ain, Beat Zberg
Stage 3 Tour de Pologne, David Kopp

2008
Switzerland National Road Race, Markus Zberg
Germany National Road Race, Fabian Wegmann
Tour du Haut Var, Davide Rebellin
Overall Paris - Nice, Davide Rebellin
GP Miguel Indurain, Fabian Wegmann
GP Schwarzwald, Mathias Frank
Dutch Food Valley Classic, Robert Förster
City Nacht Rhede, Ronny Scholz
Peperbus Profspektakel Zwolle, Bernhard Kohl
Stage 1 Volta ao Algarve, Robert Förster
Stage 3 Volta ao Algarve, Robert Förster
Stage 4 Tour de Romandie, Francesco De Bonis
Stage 4 Bayern-Rundfahrt, Stefan Schumacher
Stage 5 Bayern-Rundfahrt, Heinrich Haussler
Stage 5 Tour de Suisse, Markus Fothen
Stage 5 Rothaus Regio-Tour International, Markus Fothen
Stage 5 ENECO Tour, Carlo Westphal
Stage 7 Tour de Pologne, Robert Förster

== National champions ==
1999
Slovenia National Time Trial, Branko Filip
Germany National Time Trial, Andreas Walzer
2000
Austria National Time Trial, René Haselbacher
Germany National Time Trial, Michael Rich
National Time Trial, Sveln Gaute Holestol
2001
Austria National Time Trial, Georg Totscnhig
2002
Austria National Road Race, René Haselbacher
Austria National Time Trial, Georg Totscnhig
Germany National Time Trial, Uwe Peschel
2003
Austria National Road Race, Georg Totschnig
Germany National Time Trial, Michael Rich
2004
Austria National Time Trial, Georg Totschnig
Germany National Time Trial, Michael Rich
2005
Germany National Time Trial, Michael Rich
2006
Germany National Time Trial, Sebatian Lang
2007
Switzerland National Road Race, Beat Zberg
Germany National Road Race, Fabian Wegmann
2008
Switzerland National Road Race, Markus Zberg
Germany National Road Race, Fabian Wegmann

== See also ==
- List of teams and cyclists in the 2008 Tour de France
- 2008 Tour de France
- Tour de France
