= 2005 Tour de France, Stage 1 to Stage 11 =

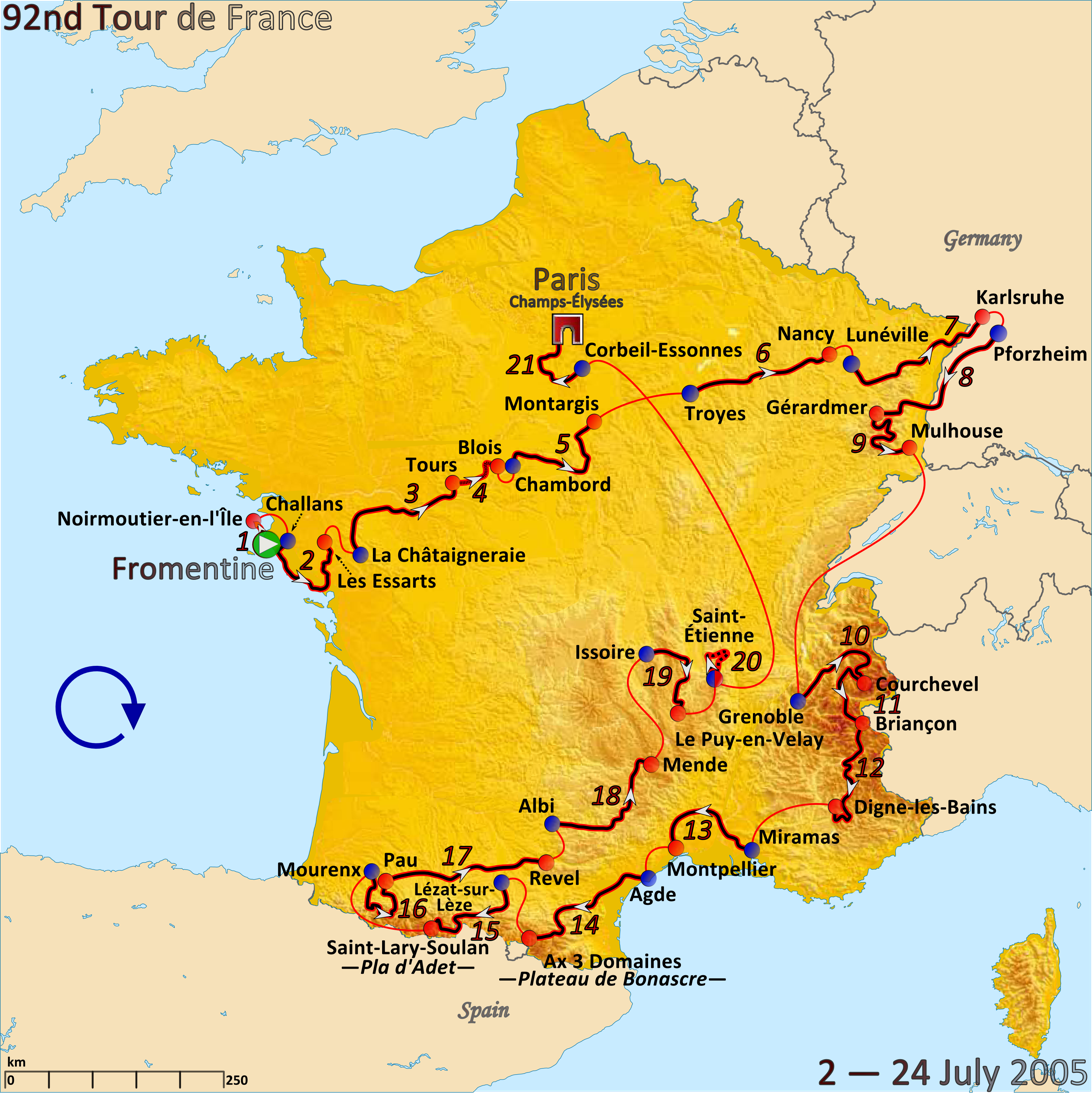
Route of the 2005 Tour de France

The 2005 Tour de France was the 92nd edition of Tour de France, one of cycling's Grand Tours. The Tour began in Fromentine with an individual time trial on 2 July and Stage 11 occurred on 13 July with a mountainous stage to Briançon. The race finished on the Champs-Élysées in Paris, on 24 July.

== Stage 1 ==
2 July 2005 — Fromentine to Noirmoutier-en-l'Île, 19 km (11.8 mi) (ITT)

The winning time of David Zabriskie was set early in the day – so early, in fact, that virtually none of the TV stations covering the Tour actually showed it. Zabriskie, who has also won a stage in the Vuelta a España and a time trial in the Giro d'Italia, put a powerful time in that few could approach. The best attempt was a run by Alexander Vinokourov, a teammate of Jan Ullrich, who came in 53 seconds back, putting him, for a time, in second place. Most of the other big names rode respectably, as with Landis, though Iban Mayo wound up four minutes behind the other GC contenders – a disappointment to be sure. Also disappointing was Joseba Beloki, who demonstrated that he has not returned to the form he had before his crash in the 2003 Tour.

The favorites of this Tour were expected to be Ivan Basso, Jan Ullrich, and Lance Armstrong — the final three starters. Basso finished 18, 1:53 back from Zabriskie. Ullrich finished in 12th place, 1:12 back, despite having a gruesome crash with his team car the day before, in which he shattered the rear window as he flew through it. Lance Armstrong, whose time trialing skills this year had been in doubt after a poor showing in the Tour de Georgia, rode an impressive time trial after a small mishap where his foot fell out of the pedal at the start, bridging the one-minute gap to Jan Ullrich with 3 km remaining; he finished two seconds behind Zabriskie.

As for the other jerseys, Zabriskie won the first green sprinter's jersey, while the winner of the previous year's prologue, Swiss Fabian Cancellara, got the white young rider's jersey.

Stage 1 result and general classification after stage 1

Rank	Rider	Team	Time
1	David Zabriskie (USA)	Team CSC	20' 51"
~~2~~	~~Lance Armstrong (USA)~~	~~Discovery Channel~~	~~+ 2"~~
3	Alexander Vinokourov (KAZ)	T-Mobile Team	+ 53"
4	George Hincapie (USA)	Discovery Channel	+ 57"
5	László Bodrogi (HUN)	Crédit Agricole	+ 59"
6	Floyd Landis (USA)	Phonak	+ 1' 02"
7	Fabian Cancellara (SUI)	Fassa Bortolo	s.t.
8	Jens Voigt (GER)	Team CSC	+ 1' 04"
9	Vladimir Karpets (RUS)	Illes Balears	+ 1' 05"
10	Igor González de Galdeano (ESP)	Liberty Seguros–Würth	+ 1' 06"

== Stage 2 ==
3 July 2005 — Challans to Les Essarts, 181.5 km (112.8 mi)

A textbook Tour day – an early break of László Bodrogi (Crédit Agricole), David Cañada (Saunier Duval–Prodir), Thomas Voeckler (Bouygues Télécom), and Sylvain Calzati (Ag2r-Prevoyance) got away and was caught at the end. This led to a bunch sprint, with a strangely lackluster McEwen holding on for third as a rock-solid Tom Boonen blasted to his 15th win of the year, and to the green jersey, which he claimed from Zabriskie, although today, in a rare occurrence, Lance Armstrong was wearing it, since Zabriskie also had the yellow jersey, which meant the green went "on loan" to Armstrong, who was second. Bodrogi racked up enough time bonuses on the intermediate sprints to pass Vinokourov in the standings for third place, 47 seconds behind Zabriskie, who held his yellow jersey. All but three of the riders finished in the peloton, making time bonuses the only things that shuffled the standings at all. In the last kilometres, the main group broke, and most of the General Classification contenders (except Jan Ullrich) came in nine seconds after Boonen. The break-up, however, was caused by a fall, and the judges applied the same time to them as the first group.

Thomas Voeckler attacked on the category 4 climb to win the points available in the mountain competition. As these were the only mountain points awarded that day, Voeckler moved into the lead of the mountain classification. He has now worn three of the four leader jerseys in the Tour de France during his career.

Stage 2 result

Rank	Rider	Team	Time
1	Tom Boonen (BEL)	Quick-Step	3h 51' 31"
2	Thor Hushovd (NOR)	Crédit Agricole	s.t.
3	Robbie McEwen (AUS)	Davitamon–Lotto	s.t.
4	Stuart O'Grady (AUS)	Cofidis	s.t.
5	Luciano Pagliarini (BRA)	Liquigas–Bianchi	s.t.
6	Juan Antonio Flecha (ESP)	Fassa Bortolo	s.t.
7	Peter Wrolich (AUT)	Gerolsteiner	s.t.
8	Jérôme Pineau (FRA)	Bouygues Télécom	s.t.
9	Baden Cooke (AUS)	Française des Jeux	s.t.
10	Allan Davis (AUS)	Liberty Seguros–Würth	s.t.

General classification after stage 2

Rank	Rider	Team	Time
1	David Zabriskie (USA)	Team CSC	4h 12' 31"
~~2~~	~~Lance Armstrong (USA)~~	~~Discovery Channel~~	~~+ 2"~~
3	László Bodrogi (HUN)	Crédit Agricole	+ 47"
4	Alexander Vinokourov (KAZ)	T-Mobile Team	+ 53"
5	George Hincapie (USA)	Discovery Channel	+ 57"
6	Jan Ullrich (GER)	T-Mobile Team	+ 59"
7	Floyd Landis (USA)	Phonak	+ 1' 02"
8	Fabian Cancellara (SUI)	Fassa Bortolo	s.t.
9	Jens Voigt (GER)	Team CSC	+ 1' 04"
10	Vladimir Karpets (RUS)	Illes Balears	+ 1' 05"

== Stage 3 ==
4 July 2005 — La Châtaigneraie to Tours, 212.5 km (132.0 mi)

A normal day with some minor drama at the finish, the early break this time consisted of Erik Dekker (Rabobank), Rubens Bertogliati (Saunier Duval), and Nicolas Portal (AG2R), who were caught 1 km from the end. Dekker had already managed a great feat at Tours the previous season by holding off the peloton after being in a breakaway for 200 kilometres, and winning the Paris–Tours. This time, however, the French city did not bring luck to the Dutchman. After the breakaways were reeled in, the Swiss time trial champion Fabian Cancellara attempted an escape in the last kilometer, but was brought back, leading to a bunch sprint. Commentators expected that the long, straight drive to the finish would favour Robbie McEwen, but instead it was Tom Boonen who took a convincing win.

At the finish line Robbie McEwen was reprimanded for trying to push Stuart O'Grady away with his head, a move possibly spurred on by O'Grady preventing him from attacking Boonen by blocking his path. Although McEwen crossed the line third, the judges knocked him to the back of the main pack, giving him a place of 186th, and dealing quite a blow to his hopes of a fourth green jersey, placing him 44 points behind Tom Boonen, who has 70.

The general classification remained unchanged, and Cancellara held his young rider's jersey, although if Tom Boonen gets another stage win time bonus, it would go to him. Meanwhile, the early break crossed two of the three category four climbs first, giving Dekker six mountain points. Voeckler could only manage to cross an early climb in second, giving him two more and bringing him up to five, putting Erik Dekker in polka dots. Dekker also won the prize of most combative rider.

Stage 3 result

Rank	Rider	Team	Time
1	Tom Boonen (BEL)	Quick-Step	4h 36' 09"
2	Peter Wrolich (AUT)	Gerolsteiner	s.t.
3	Stuart O'Grady (AUS)	Cofidis	s.t.
4	Bernhard Eisel (AUT)	Française des Jeux	s.t.
5	Allan Davis (AUS)	Liberty Seguros–Würth	s.t.
6	Robert Förster (GER)	Gerolsteiner	s.t.
7	Magnus Bäckstedt (SWE)	Liquigas–Bianchi	s.t.
8	Anthony Geslin (FRA)	Bouygues Télécom	s.t.
9	Thor Hushovd (NOR)	Crédit Agricole	s.t.
10	Angelo Furlan (ITA)	Domina Vacanze	s.t.

General classification after stage 3

Rank	Rider	Team	Time
1	David Zabriskie (USA)	Team CSC	8h 48' 31"
~~2~~	~~Lance Armstrong (USA)~~	~~Discovery Channel~~	~~+ 2"~~
3	László Bodrogi (HUN)	Crédit Agricole	+ 47"
4	Alexander Vinokourov (KAZ)	T-Mobile Team	+ 53"
5	George Hincapie (USA)	Discovery Channel	+ 57"
6	Floyd Landis (USA)	Phonak	+ 1' 02"
7	Fabian Cancellara (SUI)	Fassa Bortolo	s.t.
8	Jens Voigt (GER)	Team CSC	+ 1' 04"
9	Vladimir Karpets (RUS)	Illes Balears	+ 1' 05"
10	Igor González de Galdeano (ESP)	Liberty Seguros–Würth	+ 1' 06"

== Stage 4 ==
5 July 2005 — Tours to Blois, 67.5 km (41.9 mi) (TTT)

This was a nail-biter of a team time trial in which the teams of the three favorites – Armstrong, Ullrich, and Basso – all did well. Discovery trailed CSC in the team standings, and so launched second to last, but showed their usual team time trial form with a pencil-straight line, each member taking pulls like clockwork. As the time trial wore on, Armstrong began taking longer pulls at the front, bringing the pace of the pack up dramatically. Even still, CSC, launching behind them, kept a grueling pace of their own, actually leading Discovery through all of the checkpoints. The race wasn't decided until the last kilometer and a half, when yellow jersey David Zabriskie crashed as his knee hit the handlebar, probably because of his cycle chain malfunctioning. He got back on and crossed the line in a blood-stained yellow jersey 1'28" behind the Discovery riders. On the other hand, Ullrich, whose T-Mobile Team crossed the line at 35", lost only 30" due to the adjusted gap for the team trial stage. After this stage, Ullrich was in 14th place, 1'36" off Armstrong.

Had Zabriskie held on another half a kilometer he would have gotten the same time as the rest of CSC, but instead he dropped to ninth in the overall standings, and CSC's surprise at the yellow jersey hitting the pavement in front of them cost them two seconds on Discovery – coincidentally, the exact margin by which Zabriskie had led Armstrong going into the stage. The result was to put Armstrong in his 67th yellow jersey, and to put teammate Yaroslav Popovych in the white jersey. With no sprints or mountains, the green and polka dot jerseys remained on the shoulders of Tom Boonen and Erik Dekker, respectively.

Stage 4 result

Rank	Team	Time	Adjusted time*
1	Discovery Channel	1h 10' 39"	
2	Team CSC	+ 2"	
3	T-Mobile Team	+ 35"	+ 30"
4	Liberty Seguros–Würth	+ 53"	+ 40"
5	Phonak	+ 1' 31"	+ 50"
6	Crédit Agricole	+ 1' 41"	+ 1' 00"
7	Illes Balears	+ 2' 05"	+ 1' 10"
8	Gerolsteiner	s.t.	+ 1' 20"
9	Fassa Bortolo	+ 2' 19"	+ 1' 30"
10	Liquigas–Bianchi	+ 2' 26"	+ 1' 40"

General classification after stage 4

Rank	Rider	Team	Time
~~1~~	~~Lance Armstrong (USA)~~	~~Discovery Channel~~	~~9h 59' 12"~~
2	George Hincapie (USA)	Discovery Channel	+ 55"
3	Jens Voigt (GER)	Team CSC	+ 1' 04"
4	Bobby Julich (USA)	Team CSC	+ 1' 07"
5	José Luis Rubiera (ESP)	Discovery Channel	+ 1' 14"
6	Yaroslav Popovych (UKR)	Discovery Channel	+ 1' 16"
7	Alexander Vinokourov (KAZ)	T-Mobile Team	+ 1' 21"
8	Benjamín Noval (ESP)	Discovery Channel	+ 1' 26"
9	David Zabriskie (USA)	Team CSC	s.t.
10	Ivan Basso (ITA)	Team CSC	s.t.

Notes

* This means that even though the team finished with a longer time, the provision set forth in the Tour de France Guideline states that the gaps for the team trial stage is capped according to the relative finishing position of the teams. Thus, even though Gerolsteiner and Illes Balears-Caisse D'Epargne finished at the same time, for the riders in those two teams, IBC riders have a 10" advantage over the GST riders for the individual classifications.

== Stage 5 ==
6 July 2005 — Chambord to Montargis, 183 km (113.7 mi)

Juan Antonio Flecha made an early break, and was joined 90 km later by László Bodrogi (Crédit Agricole), Salvatore Commesso (Lampre), and Kjell Carlström (Liquigas), but not by George Hincapie, whose Discovery Channel team had earlier said they wanted to put him into a break to give him a turn in yellow. The break was finally reeled in 10 km from the finish by a Discovery-led peloton, setting up the sprint. It was a tough, uphill sprint, and McEwen took it by a wheel over Tom Boonen, taking his first win of the Tour, but still only putting him in fourth for the green jersey due to his being relegated to 186th in the third stage.

David Zabriskie recovered enough from his crash to start today, and finished with the peloton in 176th place. Out of respect for the role his crash played in the overall standings, Lance Armstrong initially refused to wear the yellow jersey today, and it was not until the race was stopped as it was rolling out of the neutral zone so that the organizers would ask him to wear it that he agreed to.

Today also saw the first withdrawal of the Tour as Constantino Zaballa of Saunier Duval–Prodir failed to finish the stage. The Yellow, Green, Polka and White jerseys remain on their respective riders.

Stage 5 result

Rank	Rider	Team	Time
1	Robbie McEwen (AUS)	Davitamon–Lotto	3h 46' 00"
2	Tom Boonen (BEL)	Quick-Step	s.t.
3	Thor Hushovd (NOR)	Crédit Agricole	s.t.
4	Stuart O'Grady (AUS)	Cofidis	s.t.
5	Angelo Furlan (ITA)	Domina Vacanze	s.t.
6	Allan Davis (AUS)	Liberty Seguros–Würth	s.t.
7	Bernhard Eisel (AUT)	Française des Jeux	s.t.
8	Baden Cooke (AUS)	Française des Jeux	s.t.
9	Jens Voigt (GER)	Team CSC	s.t.
10	Robert Förster (GER)	Gerolsteiner	s.t.

General classification after stage 5

Rank	Rider	Team	Time
~~1~~	~~Lance Armstrong (USA)~~	~~Discovery Channel~~	~~13h 45' 12"~~
2	George Hincapie (USA)	Discovery Channel	+ 55"
3	Jens Voigt (GER)	Team CSC	+ 1' 04"
4	Bobby Julich (USA)	Team CSC	+ 1' 07"
5	José Luis Rubiera (ESP)	Discovery Channel	+ 1' 14"
6	Yaroslav Popovych (UKR)	Discovery Channel	+ 1' 16"
7	Alexander Vinokourov (KAZ)	T-Mobile Team	+ 1' 21"
8	Benjamín Noval (ESP)	Discovery Channel	+ 1' 26"
9	David Zabriskie (USA)	Team CSC	s.t.
10	Ivan Basso (ITA)	Team CSC	s.t.

== Stage 6 ==
7 July 2005 — Troyes to Nancy, 199 km (123.7 mi)

An early escape initiated by Christophe Mengin (Française des Jeux) after 24 km was accompanied by Karsten Kroon (Rabobank), Jaan Kirsipuu (Crédit Agricole), Mauro Gerosa (Liquigas-Bianchi) and Stéphane Augé (Cofidis). Karsten Kroon and Stéphane Augé took 7 mountain points each, with Kroon winning the last mountain, which results in the Dutch rider wearing the polka dot jersey, keeping it in team Rabobank. Around 10 km from the finish, the breakaway was broken in pieces after an attack of Estonian champion Kirsipuu, but Mengin, a rider local to Nancy, managed to hold on and left Kirsipuu behind. One and a half kilometers from the end, Alexander Vinokourov and Lorenzo Bernucci came off the peloton to join him, and then, 700 meters from the end, Mengin risked too much, slid out and crashed, followed independently by much of the front of the peloton. The result was to give Bernucci the stage, due mostly to his superior navigation of the crash, and Vinokourov a 19-second boost in the general classification. Boonen kept the green jersey, but Hushovd's fifth-place finish gave him a substantial boost, putting him just 7 points back in that competition. Claudio Corioni of Fassa Bortolo abandoned the race.

Stage 6 result

Rank	Rider	Team	Time
1	Lorenzo Bernucci (ITA)	Fassa Bortolo	4h 12' 52"
2	Alexander Vinokourov (KAZ)	T-Mobile Team	+ 3"
3	Robert Förster (GER)	Gerolsteiner	+ 7"
4	Angelo Furlan (ITA)	Domina Vacanze	s.t.
5	Thor Hushovd (NOR)	Crédit Agricole	s.t.
6	Kim Kirchen (LUX)	Fassa Bortolo	s.t.
7	Gianluca Bortolami (ITA)	Lampre–Caffita	s.t.
8	Egoi Martínez (ESP)	Euskaltel–Euskadi	s.t.
9	Gerrit Glomser (AUT)	Lampre–Caffita	s.t.
10	Kurt Asle Arvesen (NOR)	Team CSC	s.t.

General classification after stage 6

Rank	Rider	Team	Time
~~1~~	~~Lance Armstrong (USA)~~	~~Discovery Channel~~	~~17h 58' 11"~~
2	George Hincapie (USA)	Discovery Channel	+ 55"
3	Alexander Vinokourov (KAZ)	T-Mobile Team	+ 1' 02"
4	Jens Voigt (GER)	Team CSC	+ 1' 04"
5	Bobby Julich (USA)	Team CSC	+ 1' 07"
6	José Luis Rubiera (ESP)	Discovery Channel	+ 1' 14"
7	Yaroslav Popovych (UKR)	Discovery Channel	+ 1' 16"
8	Benjamín Noval (ESP)	Discovery Channel	+ 1' 26"
9	Ivan Basso (ITA)	Team CSC	s.t.
10	Kurt Asle Arvesen (NOR)	Team CSC	+ 1' 32"

== Stage 7 ==
8 July 2005 — Lunéville to Karlsruhe, 228.5 km (142.0 mi)

Because the Tour arrived to the German city of Karlsruhe, it was clear that at least one German rider would try to win. It was Fabian Wegmann who attacked very early and gathered all the mountain points available before the peloton began his pursuit. Even though the main field flew through the French countryside propelled by Quick Step and Davitamon–Lotto, Wegmann managed to enter Germany ahead of the group, but he was eventually reeled in. This time it was Tom Boonen who sprinted too early, and he gave Robbie McEwen the chance of a second stage win in this year's Tour de France. Wegmann had gathered enough points to make him leader of the mountain's classification and receive the polka-dot jersey on the podium in front of the German public.

Stage 7 result

Rank	Rider	Team	Time
1	Robbie McEwen (AUS)	Davitamon–Lotto	5h 03' 45"
2	Magnus Bäckstedt (SWE)	Liquigas–Bianchi	s.t.
3	Bernhard Eisel (AUT)	Française des Jeux	s.t.
4	Gerrit Glomser (AUT)	Lampre–Caffita	s.t.
5	Baden Cooke (AUS)	Française des Jeux	s.t.
6	Fabian Cancellara (SUI)	Fassa Bortolo	s.t.
7	Tom Boonen (BEL)	Quick-Step	s.t.
8	Gianluca Bortolami (ITA)	Lampre–Caffita	s.t.
9	Thor Hushovd (NOR)	Crédit Agricole	s.t.
10	Juan Antonio Flecha (ESP)	Fassa Bortolo	s.t.

General classification after stage 7

Rank	Rider	Team	Time
~~1~~	~~Lance Armstrong (USA)~~	~~Discovery Channel~~	~~23h 01' 56"~~
2	George Hincapie (USA)	Discovery Channel	+ 55"
3	Alexander Vinokourov (KAZ)	T-Mobile Team	+ 1' 02"
4	Jens Voigt (GER)	Team CSC	+ 1' 04"
5	Bobby Julich (USA)	Team CSC	+ 1' 07"
6	José Luis Rubiera (ESP)	Discovery Channel	+ 1' 14"
7	Yaroslav Popovych (UKR)	Discovery Channel	+ 1' 16"
8	Benjamín Noval (ESP)	Discovery Channel	+ 1' 26"
9	Ivan Basso (ITA)	Team CSC	s.t.
10	Kurt Asle Arvesen (NOR)	Team CSC	+ 1' 32"

== Stage 8 ==
9 July 2005 — Pforzheim to Gérardmer, 231.5 km (143.8 mi)

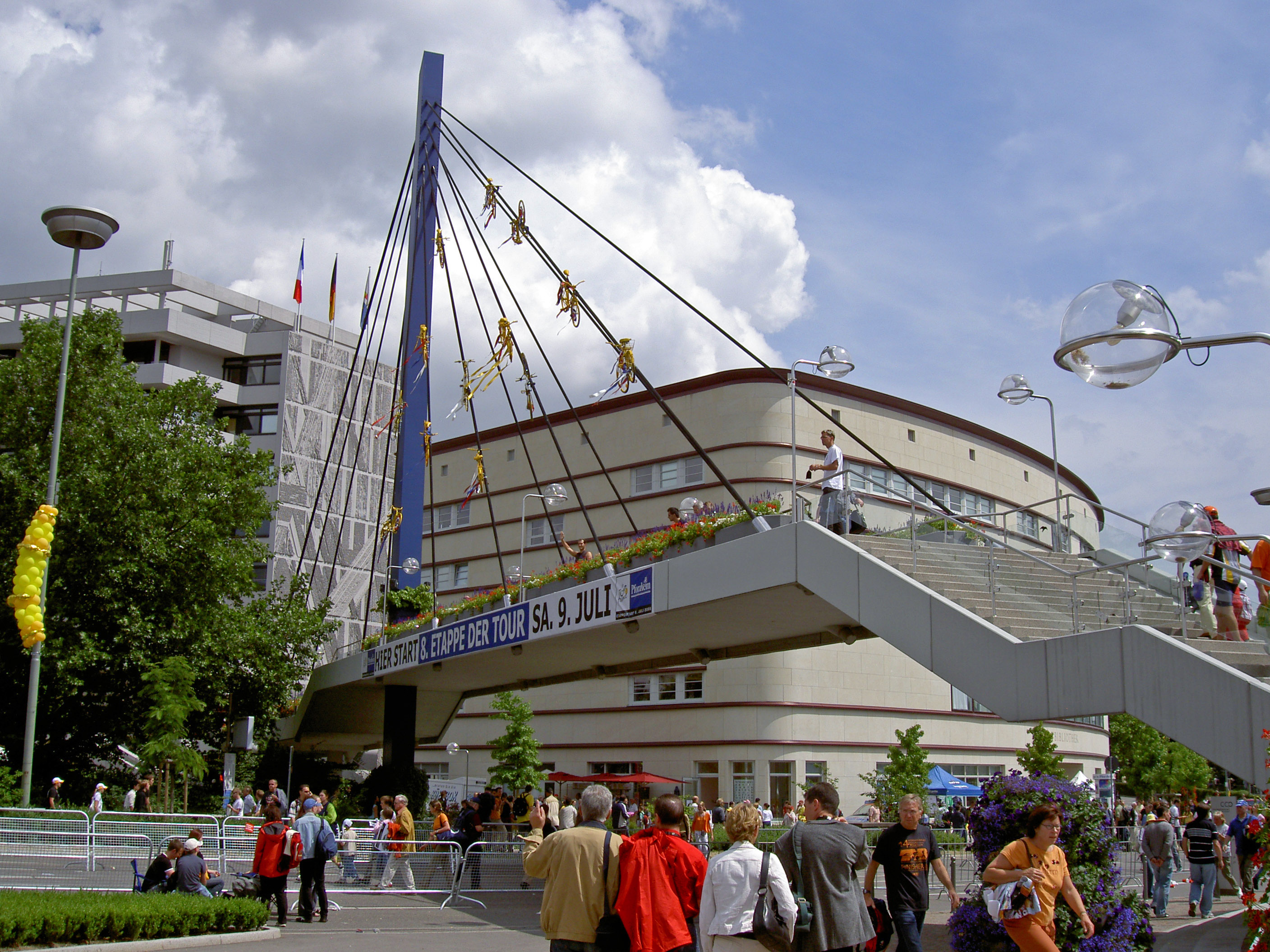
Stage 8, start line.

Stage 8 is a stage that takes the riders from Germany back into French territory. Overnight saw two riders drop out of the race, which meant at the day's start there were 183 riders still in the race. The day's stage saw four cat-3 climbs at the beginning of the stage and the first cat-2 climb of this year's race towards the end of the stage. In between the last cat-3 and the cat-2 climb the stage was relatively flat, which was supposed to benefit the sprinters more than the climbers.

Early during the race, the peloton moved at a rapid pace, causing a number of riders to drop from the main peloton. Early attacks were mostly caught, save for a group of seven riders which maintained lead towards the end. A group determined to catch the riders was attacked by Vinokourov, followed by Savoldelli; when the Italian cracked and Armstrong was left alone, the chase group with about 32 people was formed, including Ullrich, Voigt, Basso, and McGee. Taking advantage of Armstrong's solitude, another member of T-Mobile Team, Andreas Klöden, attacked and escaped, reaching the last remaining member of the breakaway. Towards the summit of the cat-2 climb, Weening and Klöden had a 17" lead over the chase group, and they were able to maintain the lead over the group when they crossed the finish line.

Because Weening and Klöden crossed the line at virtually the same time, the jury had to use the sensor system to determine the winner. Weening was declared the stage winner, beating out Klöden by 0.0002 of a second, or 9.6 millimeters. At the stage's end, Armstrong still holds the yellow jersey, although there was a lot of movement at the top 10 of the classement général. Popovych, the white jersey holder, was dropped out of the chase group and as a consequence fell out of top 10 and relinquished the white jersey to Karpets, who leads the youth classification by 1". The polka dot jersey also changed owner, as Rasmussen took 32 points out of a maximum 36 in this stage. Stage 1 winner David Zabriskie was dropped on the first climb, finished the stage in last place (51'12" off the leader) and barely escaped the fate of DNF.

Furthermore, Armstrong was isolated from his team, because none of his team-mates was able to follow the attacks in the group of the favourites, mainly the attacks of Vinokourov.

Stage 8 result

Rank	Rider	Team	Time
1	Pieter Weening (NED)	Rabobank	5h 03' 54"
2	Andreas Klöden (GER)	T-Mobile Team	+ .0002" / 9.6mm
3	Alejandro Valverde (ESP)	Illes Balears	+ 27"
4	Kim Kirchen (LUX)	Fassa Bortolo	s.t.
5	Jens Voigt (GER)	Team CSC	s.t.
6	Jan Ullrich (GER)	T-Mobile Team	s.t.
7	Cadel Evans (AUS)	Davitamon–Lotto	s.t.
8	Christophe Moreau (FRA)	Crédit Agricole	s.t.
9	Christopher Horner (USA)	Saunier Duval–Prodir	s.t.
10	Alexander Vinokourov (KAZ)	T-Mobile Team	s.t.

General classification after stage 8

Rank	Rider	Team	Time
~~1~~	~~Lance Armstrong (USA)~~	~~Discovery Channel~~	~~28h 06' 17"~~
2	Jens Voigt (GER)	Team CSC	+ 1' 00"
3	Alexander Vinokourov (KAZ)	T-Mobile Team	+ 1' 02"
4	Bobby Julich (USA)	Team CSC	+ 1' 07"
5	Ivan Basso (ITA)	Team CSC	+ 1' 26"
6	Jan Ullrich (GER)	T-Mobile Team	+ 1' 36"
7	Carlos Sastre (ESP)	Team CSC	s.t.
8	George Hincapie (USA)	Discovery Channel	+ 1' 47"
9	Andreas Klöden (GER)	T-Mobile Team	+ 1' 50"
10	Floyd Landis (USA)	Phonak	s.t.

== Stage 9 ==
10 July 2005 — Gérardmer to Mulhouse, 171 km (106.3 mi)

This stage featured three cat-3 mountains followed by the cat-2 Grand Ballon, cat-3 and finally the cat-1 climb up the Ballon d'Alsace, first crossed in the 1905 Tour de France. The terrain was designed so the challengers of the polka dot jersey had to make a move.

From the beginning of the stage there were attacks. A group of riders managed to escape the peloton. Michael Rasmussen was a part of this group in the beginning and according to the team he lost two minutes on the previous stage on purpose so that he wouldn't be a threat to the general classification and then would be able to do this attack in order to take mountain points, his main aim for this Tour. Rasmussen and Dario Cioni very quickly escaped the original group and carried on as a duo. Cioni had trouble following Rasmussen over the mountains and eventually gave up. Meanwhile, the original breakout group was reduced to Christophe Moreau and Jens Voigt. Moreau was a contender for the polka dot jersey and Voigt was in position for the yellow jersey, so they both had an interest in chasing Rasmussen. He however kept the distance even though he had been riding alone for almost the entire stage and won the stage. Moreau and Voigt came in three minutes later, which gave Voigt the yellow jersey.

Stage 9 result

Rank	Rider	Team	Time
1	Michael Rasmussen (DEN)	Rabobank	4h 08' 20"
2	Christophe Moreau (FRA)	Crédit Agricole	+ 3' 04"
3	Jens Voigt (GER)	Team CSC	s.t.
4	Stuart O'Grady (AUS)	Cofidis	+ 6' 04"
5	Philippe Gilbert (BEL)	Française des Jeux	s.t.
6	Anthony Geslin (FRA)	Bouygues Télécom	s.t.
7	Sebastian Lang (GER)	Gerolsteiner	s.t.
8	Laurent Brochard (FRA)	Bouygues Télécom	s.t.
9	Jérôme Pineau (FRA)	Bouygues Télécom	s.t.
10	Gerrit Glomser (AUT)	Lampre–Caffita	s.t.

General classification after stage 9

Rank	Rider	Team	Time
1	Jens Voigt (GER)	Team CSC	32h 18' 23"
2	Christophe Moreau (FRA)	Crédit Agricole	+ 1' 50"
3	~~Lance Armstrong (USA)~~	~~Discovery Channel~~	~~+ 2' 18"~~
4	Michael Rasmussen (DEN)	Rabobank	+ 2' 43"
5	Alexander Vinokourov (KAZ)	T-Mobile Team	+ 3' 20"
6	Bobby Julich (USA)	Team CSC	+ 3' 25"
7	Ivan Basso (ITA)	Team CSC	+ 3' 44"
8	Jan Ullrich (GER)	T-Mobile Team	+ 3' 54"
9	Carlos Sastre (ESP)	Team CSC	s.t.
10	George Hincapie (USA)	Discovery Channel	+ 4' 05"

== Stage 10 ==
12 July 2005 — Grenoble to Courchevel, 181 km (112.5 mi)

The start of the stage was delayed by as much as 40 minutes because of a protest staged by farmers who were angry over wolves being reintroduced to the Alps. Even though Discovery Channel had shown some signs of weakness in the stage won by Weening, it was the American team which lead the peloton in pursuit of a breakaway which contained Óscar Pereiro, Jörg Jaksche and some other riders. Even though most of Discovery's team fell back quite soon, Yaroslav Popovych prepared a brutal attack for his leader. The peloton broke and only Rasmussen, Valverde and Mancebo could hold Armstrong's wheel. Even though they did not collaborate with the American, a gap formed between this group, then Basso and then Ullrich and Klöden. Vinokourov had failed badly, like Christophe Moreau, who had hoped to get the yellow jersey on this stage. Armstrong's attempt to win the stage on a sprint breakaway was foiled by Valverde in the closing meters. Nonetheless, the Texan regained the maillot jaune and seemed to acknowledge Valverde's win perhaps indicating that he saw him as future heir apparent.

Stage 10 result

Rank	Rider	Team	Time
1	Alejandro Valverde (ESP)	Illes Balears	4h 50' 35"
2	Lance Armstrong (USA)	Discovery Channel	s.t.
3	Michael Rasmussen (DEN)	Rabobank	+ 9"
4	Francisco Mancebo (ESP)	Illes Balears	s.t.
5	Ivan Basso (ITA)	Team CSC	+ 1' 02"
6	Levi Leipheimer (USA)	Gerolsteiner	+ 1' 15"
7	Eddy Mazzoleni (ITA)	Lampre–Caffita	+ 2' 14"
8	Cadel Evans (AUS)	Davitamon–Lotto	s.t.
9	Andreas Klöden (GER)	T-Mobile Team	s.t.
10	Andrey Kashechkin (KAZ)	Crédit Agricole	s.t.

General classification after stage 10

Rank	Rider	Team	Time
~~1~~	~~Lance Armstrong (USA)~~	~~Discovery Channel~~	~~37h 11' 04"~~
2	Michael Rasmussen (DEN)	Rabobank	+ 38"
3	Ivan Basso (ITA)	Team CSC	+ 2' 40"
4	Christophe Moreau (FRA)	Crédit Agricole	+ 2' 42"
5	Alejandro Valverde (ESP)	Illes Balears	+ 3' 16"
6	Levi Leipheimer (USA)	Gerolsteiner	+ 3' 58"
7	Francisco Mancebo (ESP)	Illes Balears	+ 4' 00"
8	Jan Ullrich (GER)	T-Mobile Team	+ 4' 02"
9	Andreas Klöden (GER)	T-Mobile Team	+ 4' 16"
10	Floyd Landis (USA)	Phonak	s.t.

== Stage 11 ==
13 July 2005 — Courchevel to Briançon, 173 km (107.5 mi)

Stage 11 was another major mountain stage in the Alps including the legendary Col de la Madeleine and Col du Galibier climbs, the latter being the highest point of this year's tour at 2645m. Alexander Vinokourov, after a disastrous day in the previous stage to Courchevel when he lost over 5 minutes, attacked on the Col de la Madeleine. Lance Armstrong and his Discovery Channel rode strongly behind mindful of the threat from Vinokourov but aware of the advantage that they had over him. The tactics of the T-Mobile team riders, including Vinokourov, in support of their apparent team leader Jan Ullrich were, as ever, questionable. Three riders, Óscar Pereiro (this year's most aggressive rider) and Santiago Botero (both of Phonak) established a breakaway before Pereiro was dropped after the Col du Télégraphe and before the fearsome ascent of the Col du Galibier. Vinokourov crossed the summit of the Galibier first, taking the Henri Desgrange prize, in front of Botero, a rider who was enjoying a renaissance in 2005. Meanwhile, Lance Armstrong's Discovery Channel Team were controlling the peloton at just over 2 minutes behind although Michael Rasmussen jumped ahead to get more King of the Mountain points and to continue his domination of the polka dot jersey. Botero joined Vino on the now wet and dangerous descent and the pair continued together to Briançon where the Kazakhstan champion outsprinted Botero to take his second stage victory after his first one to Gap in the 2003 Tour de France that had seen the major injury to Joseba Beloki and the remarkable cross-country exploits of Lance Armstrong. The peloton, and all the main contenders, came in at 1'15" behind thus preserving Armstrong in the yellow jersey and Vinokourov's exploits not making up for the previous day's losses.

Stage 11 result

Rank	Rider	Team	Time
1	Alexander Vinokourov (KAZ)	T-Mobile Team	4h 47' 38"
2	Santiago Botero (COL)	Phonak	+ 1"
3	Christophe Moreau (FRA)	Credit Agricole	+ 1' 15"
4	Bobby Julich (USA)	Team CSC	s.t.
5	Eddy Mazzoleni (ITA)	Lampre–Caffita	s.t.
6	Lance Armstrong (USA)	Discovery Channel	s.t.
7	Cadel Evans (AUS)	Davitamon–Lotto	s.t.
8	Levi Leipheimer (USA)	Gerolsteiner	s.t.
9	Michael Rasmussen (DEN)	Rabobank	s.t.
10	Georg Totschnig (AUT)	Gerolsteiner	s.t.

General classification after stage 11

Rank	Rider	Team	Time
~~1~~	~~Lance Armstrong (USA)~~	~~Discovery Channel~~	~~41h 59' 57"~~
2	Michael Rasmussen (DEN)	Rabobank	+ 38"
3	Christophe Moreau (FRA)	Crédit Agricole	+ 2' 34"
4	Ivan Basso (ITA)	Team CSC	+ 2' 40"
5	Alejandro Valverde (ESP)	Illes Balears	+ 3' 16"
6	Santiago Botero (COL)	Phonak	+ 3' 48"
7	Levi Leipheimer (USA)	Gerolsteiner	+ 3' 58"
8	Francisco Mancebo (ESP)	Illes Balears	+ 4' 00"
9	Jan Ullrich (GER)	T-Mobile Team	+ 4' 02"
10	Andreas Klöden (GER)	T-Mobile Team	+ 4' 16"
