= 2003 Vuelta a Burgos =

Race details
- Dates: 11–15 August 2003
- Stages: 5
- Distance: 670.4 km (416.6 mi)
- Winning time: 15h 35' 49"

Results
| | Winner | Pablo Lastras (ESP) | (iBanesto.com) |
| | Second | Óscar Pereiro (ESP) | (Phonak) |
| | Third | Carlos Garcia (ESP) | (Kelme–Costa Blanca) |

The 2003 Vuelta a Burgos was the 25th edition of the Vuelta a Burgos road cycling stage race, which was held from 11 August to 15 August 2003. The race started and finished in Burgos. The race was won by Pablo Lastras of the iBanesto.com team.

== General classification ==
Final general classification

| Rank | Rider | Team | Time |
|---|---|---|---|
| 1 | Pablo Lastras (ESP) | iBanesto.com | 15h 35' 49" |
| 2 | Óscar Pereiro (ESP) | Phonak | + 10" |
| 3 | Carlos Garcia (ESP) | Kelme–Costa Blanca | + 1' 32" |
| 4 | Giampaolo Cheula (ITA) | Vini Caldirola–So.di | + 1' 48" |
| 5 | Iker Flores (ESP) | Euskaltel–Euskadi | + 2' 35" |
| 6 | Daniel Atienza (ESP) | Cofidis | + 2' 36" |
| 7 | Daniele Nardello (ITA) | Team Telekom | + 2' 55" |
| 8 | Mikel Pradera (ESP) | ONCE–Eroski | + 3' 40" |
| 9 | Domingo Sánchez (ESP) | Paternina–Costa de Almería | + 4' 48" |
| 10 | Nico Sijmens (BEL) | Vlaanderen–T Interim | + 7' 03" |
