= 2005 Tour de France, Stage 12 to Stage 21 =

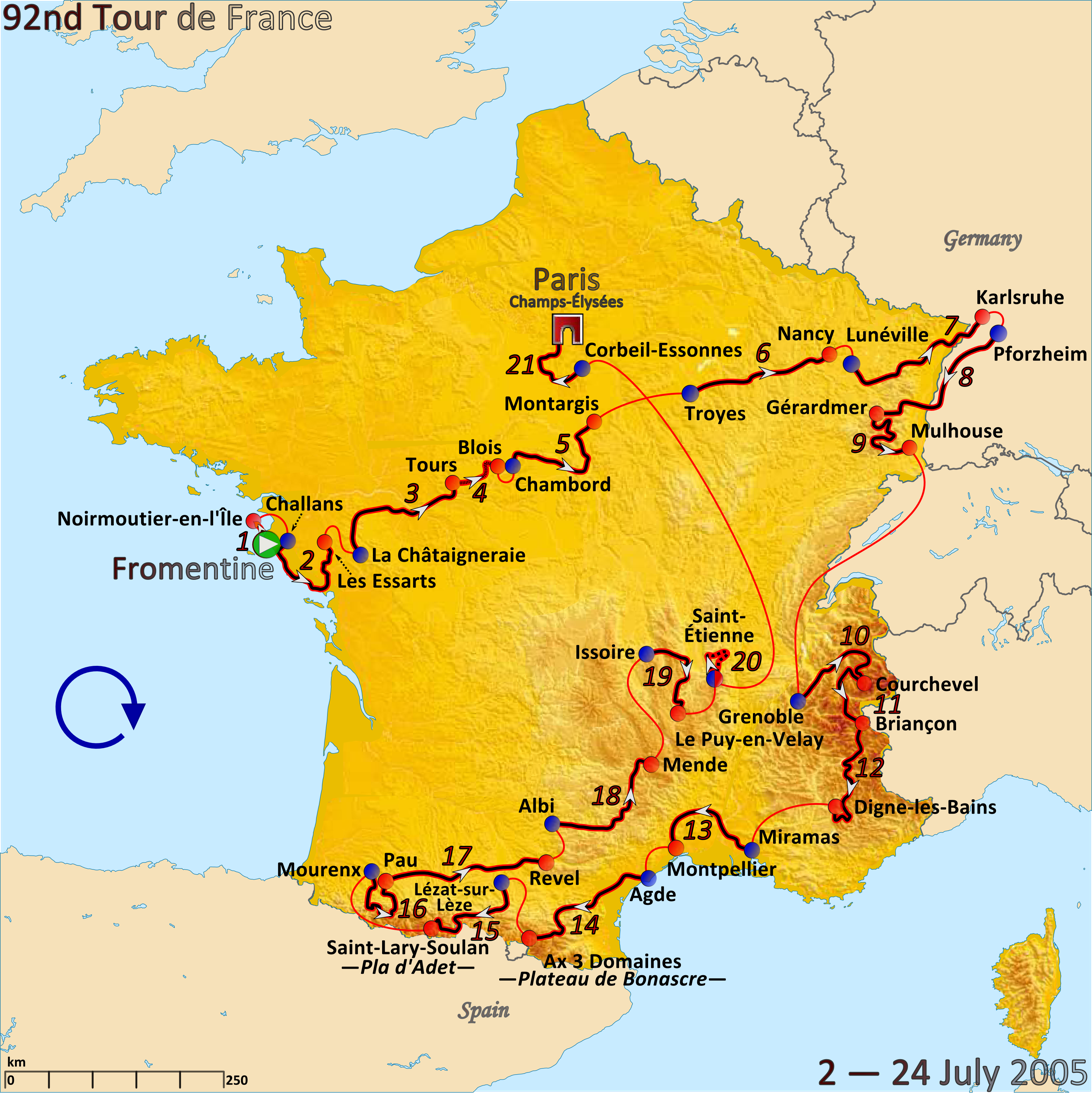
Route of the 2005 Tour de France

The 2005 Tour de France was the 92nd edition of Tour de France, one of cycling's Grand Tours. The Tour began in Fromentine with an individual time trial on 2 July and Stage 12 occurred on 14 July with a hilly stage from Briançon. The race finished on the Champs-Élysées in Paris, on 24 July.

== Stage 12 ==
14 July 2005 — Briançon to Digne-les-Bains, 187 km (116.2 mi)

This Bastille Day stage saw a large breakaway with thirteen riders (top-ten plus Giunti Massimo, Stephan Schreck and Giovanni Lombardi) that gained over four minutes on the peloton. Included were the cycling sprinters Thor Hushovd and Stuart O'Grady. The escape was disorganised, with mostly Axel Merckx trying to set the pace and organise. On the Col du Corobin it was Merckx 's task to throw the sprinters off to minimize Robbie McEwen's green jersey point loss. At the same time Davitamon–Lotto in the peloton chased the sprinters. Sandy Casar escaped first on the ascent to the Col du Corobin, but is caught again. David Moncoutié tried next and manages around a 30" lead. Despite the rest chasing him he is holding them off. Moncoutié follows Richard Virenque's National Holiday stage win of last year.

Stage 12 result

Rank	Rider	Team	Time
1	David Moncoutié (FRA)	Cofidis	4h 20' 06"
2	Sandy Casar (FRA)	Française des Jeux	+ 57"
3	Ángel Vicioso (ESP)	Liberty Seguros–Würth	s.t.
4	Patrice Halgand (FRA)	Crédit Agricole	s.t.
5	José Luis Arrieta (ESP)	Illes Balears	s.t.
6	Franco Pellizotti (ITA)	Liquigas–Bianchi	s.t.
7	Axel Merckx (BEL)	Davitamon–Lotto	s.t.
8	Juan Manuel Gárate (ESP)	Saunier Duval–Prodir	s.t.
9	Thor Hushovd (NOR)	Crédit Agricole	+ 3' 15"
10	Stuart O'Grady (AUS)	Cofidis	s.t.

General classification after stage 12

Rank	Rider	Team	Time
~~1~~	~~Lance Armstrong (USA)~~	~~Discovery Channel~~	~~46h 30' 36"~~
2	Michael Rasmussen (DEN)	Rabobank	+ 38"
3	Christophe Moreau (FRA)	Crédit Agricole	+ 2' 34"
4	Ivan Basso (ITA)	Team CSC	+ 2' 40"
5	Alejandro Valverde (ESP)	Illes Balears	+ 3' 16"
6	Santiago Botero (COL)	Phonak	+ 3' 48"
7	Levi Leipheimer (USA)	Gerolsteiner	+ 3' 58"
8	Francisco Mancebo (ESP)	Illes Balears	+ 4' 00"
9	Jan Ullrich (GER)	T-Mobile Team	+ 4' 02"
10	Andreas Klöden (GER)	T-Mobile Team	+ 4' 16"

== Stage 13 ==
15 July 2005 — Miramas to Montpellier, 173.5 km (107.8 mi)

Stage 13 result

Rank	Rider	Team	Time
1	Robbie McEwen (AUS)	Davitamon–Lotto	3h 43' 14"
2	Stuart O'Grady (AUS)	Cofidis	s.t.
3	Fred Rodriguez (USA)	Davitamon–Lotto	s.t.
4	Guido Trenti (USA)	Quick-Step–Innergetic	s.t.
5	Thor Hushovd (NOR)	Crédit Agricole	s.t.
6	Anthony Geslin (FRA)	Bouygues Télécom	s.t.
7	Robert Förster (GER)	Gerolsteiner	s.t.
8	Magnus Bäckstedt (SWE)	Liquigas–Bianchi	s.t.
9	Gianluca Bortolami (ITA)	Lampre–Caffita	s.t.
10	Chris Horner (USA)	Saunier Duval–Prodir	s.t.

General classification after stage 13

Rank	Rider	Team	Time
~~1~~	~~Lance Armstrong (USA)~~	~~Discovery Channel~~	~~50h 13' 50"~~
2	Michael Rasmussen (DEN)	Rabobank	+ 38"
3	Christophe Moreau (FRA)	Crédit Agricole	+ 2' 34"
4	Ivan Basso (ITA)	Team CSC	+ 2' 40"
5	Santiago Botero (COL)	Phonak	+ 3' 48"
6	Levi Leipheimer (USA)	Gerolsteiner	+ 3' 58"
7	Francisco Mancebo (ESP)	Illes Balears	+ 4' 00"
8	Jan Ullrich (GER)	T-Mobile Team	+ 4' 02"
9	Andreas Klöden (GER)	T-Mobile Team	+ 4' 16"
10	Floyd Landis (USA)	Phonak	s.t.

== Stage 14 ==
16 July 2005 — Agde to Ax-3 Domaines, 220.5 km (137.0 mi)

Stage 14 result

Rank	Rider	Team	Time
1	Georg Totschnig (AUT)	Gerolsteiner	5h 43' 43"
~~2~~	~~Lance Armstrong (USA)~~	~~Discovery Channel~~	~~+ 56"~~
3	Ivan Basso (ITA)	Team CSC	+ 58"
4	Jan Ullrich (GER)	T-Mobile Team	+ 1' 16"
5	Levi Leipheimer (USA)	Gerolsteiner	+ 1' 31"
6	Floyd Landis (USA)	Phonak	s.t.
7	Francisco Mancebo (ESP)	Illes Balears	+ 1' 47"
8	Michael Rasmussen (DEN)	Rabobank	s.t.
9	Andreas Klöden (GER)	T-Mobile Team	+ 2' 06"
10	Haimar Zubeldia (ESP)	Euskaltel–Euskadi	+ 2' 20"

General classification after stage 14

Rank	Rider	Team	Time
~~1~~	~~Lance Armstrong (USA)~~	~~Discovery Channel~~	~~55h 58' 17"~~
2	Michael Rasmussen (DEN)	Rabobank	+ 1' 41"
3	Ivan Basso (ITA)	Team CSC	+ 2' 46"
4	Jan Ullrich (GER)	T-Mobile Team	+ 4' 34"
5	Levi Leipheimer (USA)	Gerolsteiner	+ 4' 45"
6	Floyd Landis (USA)	Phonak	+ 5' 03"
7	Francisco Mancebo (ESP)	Illes Balears	s.t.
8	Andreas Klöden (GER)	T-Mobile Team	+ 5' 38"
9	Alexander Vinokourov (KAZ)	T-Mobile Team	+ 7' 09"
10	Christophe Moreau (FRA)	Crédit Agricole	+ 8' 37"

== Stage 15 ==
17 July 2005 — Lézat-sur-Lèze to Saint-Lary-Soulan Pla d'Adet, 205.5 km (127.7 mi)

Stage 15 result

Rank	Rider	Team	Time
1	George Hincapie (USA)	Discovery Channel	6h 06' 38"
2	Óscar Pereiro (ESP)	Phonak	+ 6"
3	Pietro Caucchioli (ITA)	Crédit Agricole	+ 38"
4	Michael Boogerd (NED)	Rabobank	+ 57"
5	Laurent Brochard (FRA)	Bouygues Télécom	+ 2' 19"
6	Ivan Basso (ITA)	Team CSC	+ 5' 04"
~~7~~	~~Lance Armstrong (USA)~~	~~Discovery Channel~~	~~s.t.~~
8	Óscar Sevilla (ESP)	T-Mobile Team	+ 6' 28"
9	Jan Ullrich (GER)	T-Mobile Team	s.t.
10	Michael Rasmussen (DEN)	Rabobank	+ 6' 32"

General classification after stage 15

Rank	Rider	Team	Time
~~1~~	~~Lance Armstrong (USA)~~	~~Discovery Channel~~	~~62h 09' 59"~~
2	Ivan Basso (ITA)	Team CSC	+ 2' 46"
3	Michael Rasmussen (DEN)	Rabobank	+ 3' 09"
4	Jan Ullrich (GER)	T-Mobile Team	+ 5' 58"
5	Francisco Mancebo (ESP)	Illes Balears	+ 6' 31"
6	Levi Leipheimer (USA)	Gerolsteiner	+ 7' 35"
7	Floyd Landis (USA)	Phonak	+ 9' 33"
8	Alexander Vinokourov (KAZ)	T-Mobile Team	+ 9' 38"
9	Christophe Moreau (FRA)	Crédit Agricole	+ 11' 47"
10	Andreas Klöden (GER)	T-Mobile Team	+ 12' 01"

Stage 15 recap

== Stage 16 ==
19 July 2005 — Mourenx to Pau, 180.5 km (112.2 mi)

Stage 16 result

Rank	Rider	Team	Time
1	Óscar Pereiro (ESP)	Phonak	4h 38' 40"
2	Xabier Zandio (ESP)	Illes Balears	s.t.
3	Eddy Mazzoleni (ITA)	Lampre–Caffita	s.t.
4	Cadel Evans (AUS)	Davitamon–Lotto	s.t.
5	Philippe Gilbert (BEL)	Française des Jeux	+ 2' 25"
6	Anthony Geslin (FRA)	Bouygues Télécom	s.t.
7	Jörg Ludewig (GER)	Domina Vacanze	s.t.
8	Juan Antonio Flecha (ESP)	Fassa Bortolo	s.t.
9	Ludovic Turpin (FRA)	AG2R Prévoyance	s.t.
10	Cédric Vasseur (FRA)	Cofidis	s.t.

General classification after stage 16

Rank	Rider	Team	Time
~~1~~	~~Lance Armstrong (USA)~~	~~Discovery Channel~~	~~66h 52' 03"~~
2	Ivan Basso (ITA)	Team CSC	+ 2' 46"
3	Michael Rasmussen (DEN)	Rabobank	+ 3' 09"
4	Jan Ullrich (GER)	T-Mobile Team	+ 5' 58"
5	Francisco Mancebo (ESP)	Illes Balears	+ 6' 31"
6	Levi Leipheimer (USA)	Gerolsteiner	+ 7' 35"
7	Cadel Evans (AUS)	Davitamon–Lotto	+ 9' 29"
8	Floyd Landis (USA)	Phonak	+ 9' 33"
9	Alexander Vinokourov (KAZ)	T-Mobile Team	+ 9' 38"
10	Christophe Moreau (FRA)	Crédit Agricole	+ 11' 47"

== Stage 17 ==
20 July 2005 — Pau to Revel, 239.5 km (148.8 mi)

Stage 17 result

Rank	Rider	Team	Time
1	Paolo Savoldelli (ITA)	Discovery Channel	5h 41' 19"
2	Kurt Asle Arvesen (NOR)	Team CSC	s.t.
3	Simon Gerrans (AUS)	AG2R Prévoyance	+ 8"
4	Sébastien Hinault (FRA)	Crédit Agricole	+ 11"
5	Andriy Hryvko (UKR)	Domina Vacanze	+ 24"
6	Óscar Sevilla (ESP)	T-Mobile Team	+ 51"
7	Bram Tankink (NED)	Quick-Step	s.t.
8	Daniele Righi (ITA)	Lampre–Caffita	+ 53"
9	Samuel Dumoulin (FRA)	AG2R Prévoyance	+ 3' 14"
10	Allan Davis (AUS)	Liberty Seguros–Würth	s.t.

General classification after stage 17

Rank	Rider	Team	Time
~~1~~	~~Lance Armstrong (USA)~~	~~Discovery Channel~~	~~72h 55' 50"~~
2	Ivan Basso (ITA)	Team CSC	+ 2' 46"
3	Michael Rasmussen (DEN)	Rabobank	+ 3' 09"
4	Jan Ullrich (GER)	T-Mobile Team	+ 5' 58"
5	Francisco Mancebo (ESP)	Illes Balears	+ 6' 31"
6	Levi Leipheimer (USA)	Gerolsteiner	+ 7' 35"
7	Alexander Vinokourov (KAZ)	T-Mobile Team	+ 9' 38"
8	Cadel Evans (AUS)	Davitamon–Lotto	+ 9' 49"
9	Floyd Landis (USA)	Phonak	+ 9' 53"
10	Christophe Moreau (FRA)	Crédit Agricole	+ 12' 07"

== Stage 18 ==
21 July 2005 — Albi to Mende, 189 km (117.4 mi)

Stage 18 result

Rank	Rider	Team	Time
1	Marcos Serrano (ESP)	Liberty Seguros–Würth	4h 37' 36"
2	Cédric Vasseur (FRA)	Cofidis	+ 27"
3	Axel Merckx (BEL)	Davitamon–Lotto	s.t.
4	Xabier Zandio (ESP)	Illes Balears	+ 1' 08"
5	Franco Pellizotti (ITA)	Liquigas–Bianchi	s.t.
6	Thomas Voeckler (FRA)	Bouygues Télécom	+ 1' 18"
7	Luke Roberts (AUS)	Team CSC	+ 1' 28"
8	Matthias Kessler (GER)	T-Mobile Team	+ 1' 44"
9	Egoi Martínez (ESP)	Euskaltel–Euskadi	+ 2' 03"
10	Carlos Da Cruz (FRA)	Française des Jeux	+ 2' 38"

General classification after stage 18

Rank	Rider	Team	Time
~~1~~	~~Lance Armstrong (USA)~~	~~Discovery Channel~~	~~77h 44' 44"~~
2	Ivan Basso (ITA)	Team CSC	+ 2' 46"
3	Michael Rasmussen (DEN)	Rabobank	+ 3' 46"
4	Jan Ullrich (GER)	T-Mobile Team	+ 5' 58"
5	Francisco Mancebo (ESP)	Illes Balears	+ 7' 08"
6	Levi Leipheimer (USA)	Gerolsteiner	+ 8' 12"
7	Cadel Evans (AUS)	Davitamon–Lotto	+ 9' 49"
8	Alexander Vinokourov (KAZ)	T-Mobile Team	+ 10' 11"
9	Floyd Landis (USA)	Phonak	+ 10' 42"
10	Christophe Moreau (FRA)	Crédit Agricole	+ 13' 15"

== Stage 19 ==
22 July 2005 — Issoire to Le Puy-en-Velay, 153.5 km (95.4 mi)

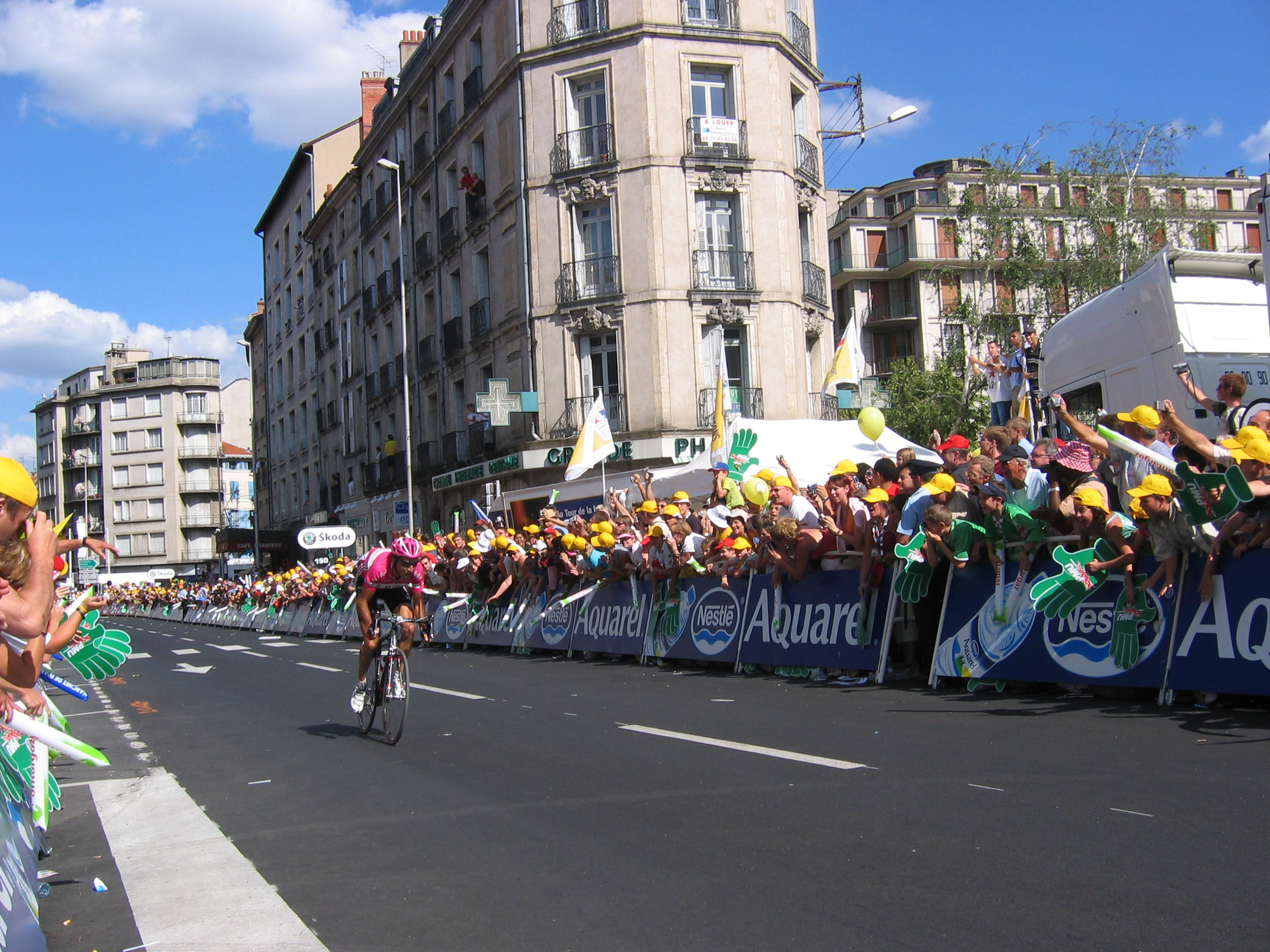
Giuseppe Guerini in the last kilometre of the stage

Stage 19 result

Rank	Rider	Team	Time
1	Giuseppe Guerini (ITA)	T-Mobile Team	3h 33' 04"
2	Sandy Casar (FRA)	Française des Jeux	+ 10"
3	Franco Pellizotti (ITA)	Liquigas–Bianchi	s.t.
4	Óscar Pereiro (ESP)	Phonak	+ 12"
5	Salvatore Commesso (ITA)	Lampre–Caffita	+ 2' 43"
6	Kurt Asle Arvesen (NOR)	Team CSC	+ 2' 48"
7	Nicolas Portal (FRA)	AG2R Prévoyance	s.t.
8	Bert Grabsch (GER)	Phonak	s.t.
9	Sylvain Chavanel (FRA)	Cofidis	s.t.
10	Pieter Weening (NED)	Rabobank	+ 3' 50"

General classification after stage 19

Rank	Rider	Team	Time
~~1~~	~~Lance Armstrong (USA)~~	~~Discovery Channel~~	~~81h 22' 19"~~
2	Ivan Basso (ITA)	Team CSC	+ 2' 46"
3	Michael Rasmussen (DEN)	Rabobank	+ 3' 46"
4	Jan Ullrich (GER)	T-Mobile Team	+ 5' 58"
5	Francisco Mancebo (ESP)	Illes Balears	+ 7' 08"
6	Levi Leipheimer (USA)	Gerolsteiner	+ 8' 12"
7	Cadel Evans (AUS)	Davitamon–Lotto	+ 9' 49"
8	Alexander Vinokourov (KAZ)	T-Mobile Team	+ 10' 11"
9	Floyd Landis (USA)	Phonak	+ 10' 42"
10	Óscar Pereiro (ESP)	Phonak	+ 12' 39"

== Stage 20 ==
23 July 2005 — Saint-Étienne to Saint-Étienne, 55.5 km (34.5 mi)

Highlights:

- Ivan Basso: Spent much energy in the first half of the race, which made him faster than Armstrong at the 14 km flag but in the end he was placed only fifth.
- Michael Rasmussen: Defending his third place did not work out too well. Nearly everything that could fail, failed. First he slipped and fell at a rotonde after 4 km. This caused his specially calibrated bike to ride suboptimally. He demanded a new hind wheel, but instead got a whole new bike. Not happy with this bike, he had to wait for the mechanic to fix his personal bike. This caused him to panic, lose his self-confidence and his ability to cut curves. On a technical downhill part he saltoed into a ditch. In total, he changed his bike two times and his wheels two times.
- Santiago Botero: Missed a curve.

Stage 20 result

Rank	Rider	Team	Time
~~1~~	~~Lance Armstrong (USA)~~	~~Discovery Channel~~	~~1h 11' 46"~~
2	Jan Ullrich (GER)	T-Mobile Team	+ 23"
3	Alexander Vinokourov (KAZ)	T-Mobile Team	+ 1' 17"
4	Bobby Julich (USA)	Team CSC	+ 1' 33"
5	Ivan Basso (ITA)	Team CSC	+ 1' 54"
6	Floyd Landis (USA)	Phonak	+ 2' 02"
7	Cadel Evans (AUS)	Davitamon–Lotto	+ 2' 06"
8	George Hincapie (USA)	Discovery Channel	+ 2' 26"
9	Francisco Mancebo (ESP)	Illes Balears	+ 2' 51"
10	Vladimir Karpets (RUS)	Illes Balears	+ 3' 06"

General classification after stage 20

Rank	Rider	Team	Time
~~1~~	~~Lance Armstrong (USA)~~	~~Discovery Channel~~	~~82h 34' 05"~~
2	Ivan Basso (ITA)	Team CSC	+ 4' 40"
3	Jan Ullrich (GER)	T-Mobile Team	+ 6' 21"
4	Francisco Mancebo (ESP)	Illes Balears	+ 9' 59"
5	Levi Leipheimer (USA)	Gerolsteiner	+ 11' 25"
6	Alexander Vinokourov (KAZ)	T-Mobile Team	+ 11' 27"
7	Michael Rasmussen (DEN)	Rabobank	+ 11' 33"
8	Cadel Evans (AUS)	Davitamon–Lotto	+ 11' 55"
9	Floyd Landis (USA)	Phonak	+ 12' 44"
10	Óscar Pereiro (ESP)	Phonak	+ 16' 04"

== Stage 21 ==
23 July 2005 — Corbeil-Essonnes to Paris Champs-Élysées, 144.5 km (89.8 mi)

Stage 21 result

Rank	Rider	Team	Time
1	Alexander Vinokourov (KAZ)	T-Mobile Team	3h 40' 57"
2	Bradley McGee (AUS)	Française des Jeux	s.t.
3	Fabian Cancellara (SUI)	Fassa Bortolo	s.t.
4	Robbie McEwen (AUS)	Davitamon–Lotto	s.t.
5	Stuart O'Grady (AUS)	Cofidis	s.t.
6	Allan Davis (AUS)	Liberty Seguros–Würth	s.t.
7	Thor Hushovd (NOR)	Crédit Agricole	s.t.
8	Baden Cooke (AUS)	Française des Jeux	s.t.
9	Bernhard Eisel (AUT)	Française des Jeux	s.t.
10	Robert Förster (GER)	Gerolsteiner	s.t.

General classification after stage 21

Rank	Rider	Team	Time
~~1~~	~~Lance Armstrong (USA)~~	~~Discovery Channel~~	~~86h 15' 02"~~
2	Ivan Basso (ITA)	Team CSC	+ 4' 40"
3	Jan Ullrich (GER)	T-Mobile Team	+ 6' 21"
4	Francisco Mancebo (ESP)	Illes Balears	+ 9' 59"
5	Alexander Vinokourov (KAZ)	T-Mobile Team	+ 11' 01"
6	Levi Leipheimer (USA)	Gerolsteiner	+ 11' 21"
7	Michael Rasmussen (DEN)	Rabobank	+ 11' 33"
8	Cadel Evans (AUS)	Davitamon–Lotto	+ 11' 55"
9	Floyd Landis (USA)	Phonak	+ 12' 44"
10	Óscar Pereiro (ESP)	Phonak	+ 16' 04"
