= 2005 Tour de France =

2005 UCI ProTour, race 17 of 28
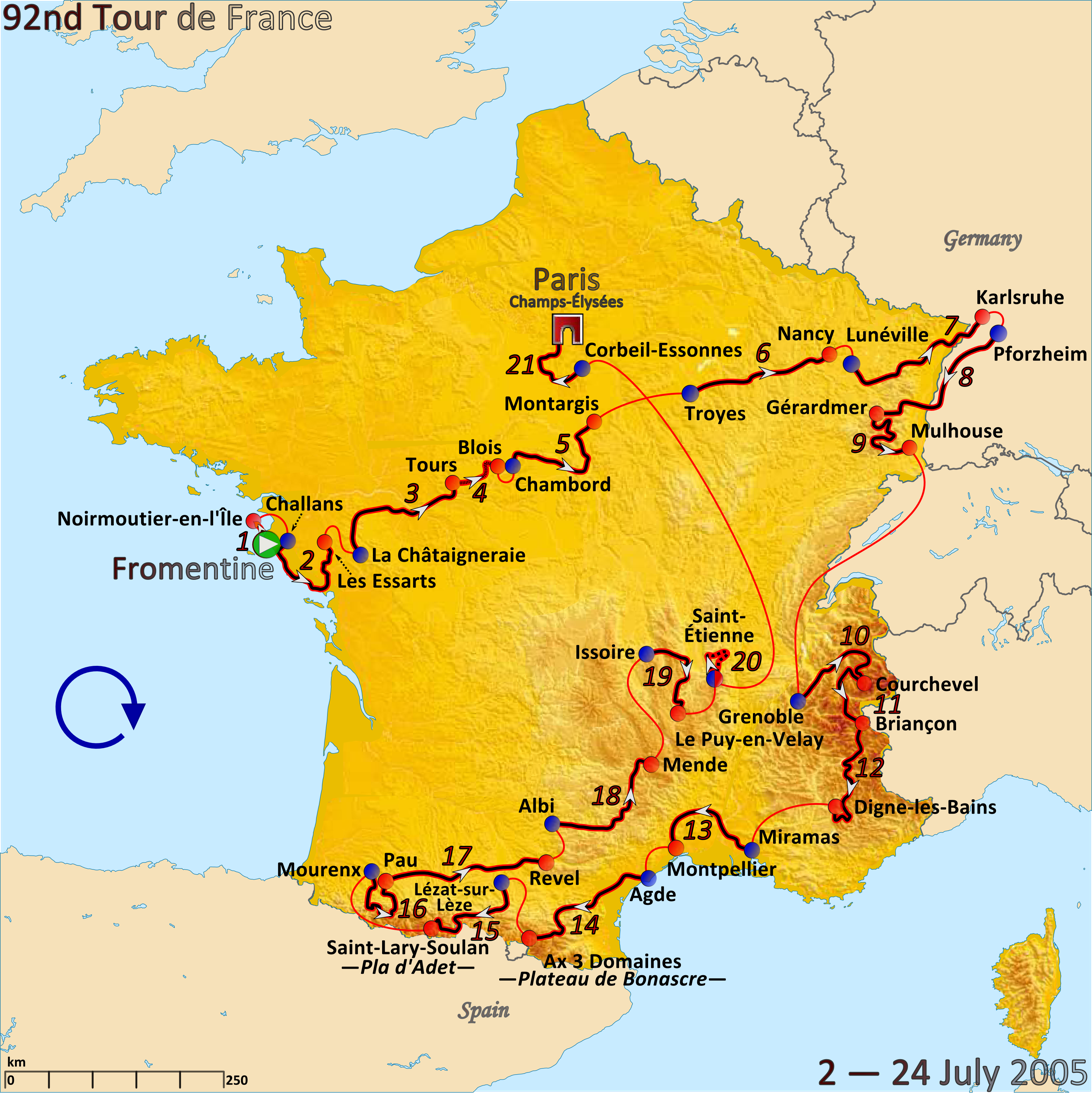
- Route of the 2005 Tour de France

Race details
- Dates: 2–24 July 2005
- Stages: 21
- Distance: 3,593 km (2,233 mi)
- Winning time: 86h 15' 02"

Results
	Winner	~~Lance Armstrong~~ none (Note: On 24 August 2012, the United States Anti-Doping Agency announced that they had disqualified Armstrong from all his results since 1998, including his victory in the 2005 Tour de France. The Union Cycliste Internationale, responsible for the international cycling, confirmed this verdict on 22 October 2012.)	
	Second	Ivan Basso (ITA)	(Team CSC)
	Third	~~Jan Ullrich~~ none (Note: Although Ullrich's name still appears on the website page of the 2005 Tour, he has been officially stripped of his finish by the Court of Arbitration for Sport.)	
Jersey awarded to the points classification winner	Points	Thor Hushovd (Norway)	(Crédit Agricole)
Jersey awarded to the mountains classification winner	Mountains	Michael Rasmussen (DEN)	(Rabobank)
Jersey awarded to the young rider classification winner	Young rider	Yaroslav Popovych (Ukraine)	(Discovery Channel)
Jersey awarded to the combativity classification winner	Combativity	Óscar Pereiro (ESP)	(Phonak)
	Team	T-Mobile Team	

The 2005 Tour de France was the 92nd edition of the Tour de France, one of cycling's Grand Tours. It took place between 2–24 July, with 21 stages covering a distance 3,593 km (2,233 mi). It has no overall winner—although American cyclist Lance Armstrong originally won the event, the United States Anti-Doping Agency announced on 24 August 2012 that they had disqualified Armstrong from all his results since 1 August 1998, including his seven Tour de France wins from 1999 to 2005. The verdict was subsequently confirmed by the UCI.

The first stages were held in the département of the Vendée, for the third time in 12 years. The 2005 Tour was announced on 28 October 2004. It was a clockwise route, visiting the Alps before the Pyrenees. Armstrong took the top step on the podium, for what was then the seventh consecutive time. He was accompanied on the podium by Ivan Basso and Jan Ullrich, but in 2012 Ullrich's results were annulled. The points classification was won by Thor Hushovd, and the mountains classification by Michael Rasmussen.

The race was seen by 15 million spectators along the road, and by 2 billion viewers on TV.

== Teams ==
In 2005, the UCI had started the ProTour: 20 teams were given a ProTour licence, and were required to start in all ProTour races, which included the Tour de France. The Tour de France organisation was not happy with this rule, as they wanted to be able to decide which teams would join their race. While negotiations were still ongoing, it was decided to use the UCI rule for the 2005 Tour, so all 20 ProTour teams were automatically invited. The Tour organisation could invite one extra team with a wildcard, and used this to invite AG2R Prévoyance. All teams were composed of nine cyclists, so 189 riders in 21 teams commenced the 2005 Tour de France. Of them, 155 riders finished.

The teams entering the race were:

- AG2R Prévoyance
- Bouygues Télécom
- Cofidis
- Crédit Agricole
- Team CSC
- Davitamon–Lotto
- Discovery Channel
- Domina Vacanze
- Euskaltel–Euskadi
- Fassa Bortolo
- Française des Jeux
- Gerolsteiner
- Illes Balears–Caisse d'Epargne
- Lampre–Caffita
- Liberty Seguros–Würth
- Liquigas–Bianchi
- Phonak
- Quick-Step–Innergetic
- Rabobank
- Saunier Duval–Prodir
- T-Mobile Team

== Pre-race favourites ==
The main favourite was (then) six-time winner Armstrong (now stripped of all his victories). Armstrong had had doubts if he should start the 2005 Tour, but decided in February 2005 that he would race. His main rival Ullrich was happy with this decision, as he thought it would be a better race with Armstrong present.

In previous years, Ullrich never had the full support of his team to win the general classification, as his team was also aiming for stage victories. In 2005, Erik Zabel, who had won the points classification six times, was left out of the team, and Ullrich was supported by Klöden and Vinokourov, who both had already reached the podium on the Tour.

On the day before the Tour started, Ullrich crashed into his team director's car, but was not seriously injured.

== Route and stages ==
The Tour commemorated the death of Fabio Casartelli. During the 15th stage the riders passed the Col de Portet d'Aspet, where Casartelli died exactly 10 years earlier, in the 1995 Tour de France. The Tour also commemorated the first time there was an official mountain climb in the Tour, the Ballon d'Alsace. During the 9th stage this mountain was passed again, exactly 100 years after the first ascent in the Tour.

The 2005 Tour de France was divided into 21 stages. These stages belong to different categories: 8 were flat stages, 5 were medium mountain stages, 5 were high mountain stages, 2 were individual time trials and 1 was a team time trial. The distinction between flat stage, medium mountain stage and high mountain stage is important for the points classification. The highest point of elevation in the race was 2,642 m (8,668 ft) at the summit of the Col du Galibier mountain pass on stage 11. There were two rest days, in Grenoble and in Pau.

The traditional prologue on the first day was replaced by an individual time trial of more than twice the length of a standard prologue. This stage crossed from the mainland of France to the Île de Noirmoutier. The most famous route to this island is the Passage du Gois, a road that is under water at high tide. This road was included in the 1999 Tour. Several of the favourites crashed there that year, and ended that stage 7 minutes behind the peloton. This year they took the bridge to the island. Later in the race, there was one more time trial, on the penultimate day. Also, there were just three uphill finishes (Courchevel, Ax-3 Domaines and Pla d'Adet), a lower number than in previous years. The finish line of the last stage was, as has been since 1975, on the Champs-Élysées in Paris.

In the stages that were not time trials, there were intermediate sprints. Cyclist who crossed the intermediate sprints first received points for the points classification, and bonification seconds for the general classification. Until stage 8, there were three intermediate sprints, and from stage 9 on there were two.

Stage characteristics and winners
Stage	Date	Course	Distance	Type	Winner
1	2 July	Fromentine to Noirmoutier-en-l'Île	19.0 km (11.8 mi)	Individual time trial	~~David Zabriskie (USA)~~
2	3 July	Challans to Les Essarts	181.5 km (112.8 mi)	Plain stage	Tom Boonen (BEL)
3	4 July	La Châtaigneraie to Tours	212.5 km (132.0 mi)	Plain stage	Tom Boonen (BEL)
4	5 July	Tours to Blois	67.5 km (41.9 mi)	Team time trial	Discovery Channel
5	6 July	Chambord to Montargis	183.0 km (113.7 mi)	Plain stage	Robbie McEwen (AUS)
6	7 July	Troyes to Nancy	199.0 km (123.7 mi)	Plain stage	Lorenzo Bernucci (ITA)
7	8 July	Lunéville to Karlsruhe (Germany)	228.5 km (142.0 mi)	Plain stage	Robbie McEwen (AUS)
8	9 July	Pforzheim (Germany) to Gérardmer	231.5 km (143.8 mi)	Hilly stage	Pieter Weening (NED)
9	10 July	Gérardmer to Mulhouse	171.0 km (106.3 mi)	Hilly stage	Michael Rasmussen (DEN)
	11 July	Grenoble		Rest day	
10	12 July	Grenoble to Courchevel	177.0 km (110.0 mi)	Mountain stage	Alejandro Valverde (ESP)
11	13 July	Courchevel to Briançon	173.0 km (107.5 mi)	Mountain stage	Alexander Vinokourov (KAZ)
12	14 July	Briançon to Digne-les-Bains	187.0 km (116.2 mi)	Hilly stage	David Moncoutié (FRA)
13	15 July	Miramas to Montpellier	173.5 km (107.8 mi)	Plain stage	Robbie McEwen (AUS)
14	16 July	Agde to Ax 3 Domaines	220.5 km (137.0 mi)	Mountain stage	Georg Totschnig (AUT)
15	17 July	Lézat-sur-Lèze to Saint-Lary-Soulan Pla d'Adet	205.5 km (127.7 mi)	Mountain stage	~~George Hincapie (USA)~~
	18 July	Pau		Rest day	
16	19 July	Mourenx to Pau	180.5 km (112.2 mi)	Mountain stage	Óscar Pereiro (ESP)
17	20 July	Pau to Revel	239.5 km (148.8 mi)	Plain stage	Paolo Savoldelli (ITA)
18	21 July	Albi to Mende	189.0 km (117.4 mi)	Hilly stage	Marcos Antonio Serrano (ESP)
19	22 July	Issoire to Le Puy-en-Velay	153.5 km (95.4 mi)	Hilly stage	Giuseppe Guerini (ITA)
20	23 July	Saint-Étienne to Saint-Étienne	55.5 km (34.5 mi)	Individual time trial	~~Lance Armstrong~~ (USA)
21	24 July	Corbeil-Essonnes to Paris (Champs-Élysées)	144.5 km (89.8 mi)	Plain stage	Alexander Vinokourov (KAZ)
	Total		3,593 km (2,233 mi)		

== Race overview ==
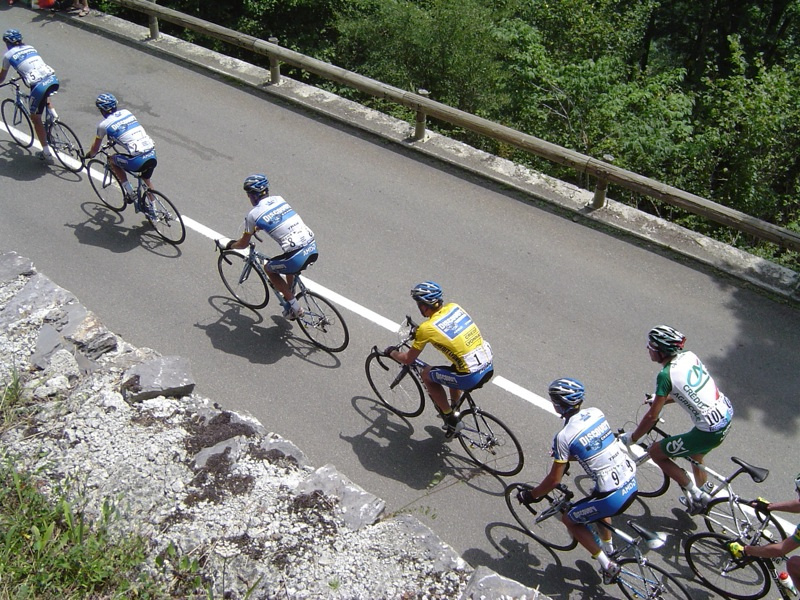
Lance Armstrong in the race leader's yellow jersery accompanied by his teammates of Discovery Channel

In Stage 1, David Zabriskie, a former teammate of Lance Armstrong, beat Armstrong by two seconds. In the team time trial of stage 4, Zabriskie fell in the last kilometres, and Armstrong took over the lead.

Armstrong initially refused to wear the yellow jersey in the fifth stage (Note: It is a tradition that a cyclist who becomes the new leader because the previous leader was injured, does not wear the yellow jersey. Merckx did so in 1971 after Ocaña fell, Zoetemelk did so in 1980 after Hinault left, and LeMond did so in 1991 after Sørensen crashed.) but was forced by the Tour organisation, who threatened to remove him from the race.

In the tenth stage, the start was moved from Grenoble to Froges.

Before the 20th stage, an individual time trial, Michael Rasmussen occupied the third place in the general classification. During that stage, Rasmussen fell multiple times and changed bicycles multiple times, and lost so much time that he ended up at the seventh place in the general classification. All total throughout the stage he changed bikes twice, changed wheels twice, began to hesitate going through corners and went off the road. His final time during this ITT was still better than half the field.

The race jury invoked the 'rain rule' for the Champs-Élysées, meaning that Lance Armstrong became the winner of the General classification the first time the race passed the finish line, rather than the eighth time as normal. The time bonification for the winner of the stage was still given, and Alexander Vinokourov profited from this as he won the stage after an escape in the last kilometre (the first time since 1994 that the final stage did not end in a sprint), and passed Levi Leipheimer in the general classification to end fifth.

During the final ceremonies in Paris, Armstrong was allowed to talk to the crowds, the first time in the Tour's history that a winner was given this chance. It has since become a regular occurrence.

=== Doping ===
During the race, 143 urine tests and 21 blood tests were conducted. None of them returned positive. Still, there were fears that banned substances were being used; the boss of the Amore & Vita–Beretta team (not racing in the 2005 Tour) questioned the increase in velocities.

In 2010, Hans Michael Holczer, the team boss of Gerolsteiner in 2005, said that the UCI had informed him that Leipheimer had shown blood values just under the doping limit, and that Holczer suspected that Leipheimer was doping. The UCI advised Gerolsteiner to find a reason to remove Leipheimer from the race, but Holczer refused, because his team was still facing bad publicity from a previous doping case.

The top five of the general classification of 2005 would not compete the 2006 edition. Armstrong had retired after the 2005 Tour, and a few days before the 2006 edition, after it became public that (among others) Basso, Ullrich and Mancebo were under investigation in the Operacion Puerto doping case, the Tour organisation and team leaders decided to exclude all cyclists under investigation from joining the Tour. Vinokourov, fifth-placed in 2005, was not under investigation, but his team was reduced to five cyclists, below the minimal required amount of six, so he could also not compete.

In February 2012, the Court of Arbitration for Sport found Ullrich guilty of being engaged in Fuentes' doping program, and decided that Ullrich's results since May 2005, including his results from the 2005 Tour de France, would be disqualified.

Subsequent to Armstrong's statement to withdraw his fight against United States Anti-Doping Agency's (USADA) charges, on 24 August 2012, the USADA said it would ban Armstrong for life and stripped him of his record seven Tour de France titles. Later that day it was confirmed in a USADA statement that Armstrong was banned for life and would be disqualified from any and all competitive results obtained on and subsequent to 1 August 1998, including forfeiture of any medals, titles, winnings, finishes, points and prizes. On 22 October 2012, the Union Cycliste Internationale endorsed the USADA sanctions, and decided not to award victories to any other rider or upgrade other placings in any of the affected events.

Michael Rasmussen, winner of the mountains classification, revealed in 2013 that in a doping test his value of immature red blood cells was below the minimum threshold, but that the UCI allowed him to continue in the race because they did not want an incident.

== Classification leadership and minor prizes ==
There were four main individual classifications contested in the 2005 Tour de France, as well as a team competition. The most important was the general classification, which was calculated by adding each rider's finishing times on each stage, with time bonuses given at the end of each mass start stage. If a crash had happened within the final 3 km (1.9 mi) of a stage, not including time trials and summit finishes, the riders involved would have received the same time as the group they were in when the crash occurred. The rider with the lowest cumulative time was the winner of the general classification and was considered the overall winner of the Tour. The rider leading the classification wore a yellow jersey.

The second classification was the points classification. Riders received points for finishing in the highest positions in a stage finish, or in intermediate sprints during the stage. The points available for each stage finish were determined by the stage's type. The leader was identified by a green jersey.

The third classification was the mountains classification. Most stages of the race included one or more categorised climbs, in which points were awarded to the riders that reached the summit first. The climbs were categorised as fourth-, third-, second- or first-category, or hors catégorie for the most difficult climbs. The leader wore a white jersey with red polka dots.

The final individual classification was the young rider classification. This was calculated the same way as the general classification, but the classification was restricted to riders who were born on or after 1 January 1980. The leader wore a white jersey.

The final classification was a team classification. This was calculated using the finishing times of the best three riders per team on each stage; the leading team was the team with the lowest cumulative time. The number of stage victories and placings per team determined the outcome of a tie.

In addition, there was a combativity award given after each mass start stage to the rider considered, by a jury, to have "made the greatest effort and who has demonstrated the best qualities of sportsmanship". The winner wore a red number bib the following stage. At the conclusion of the Tour, Óscar Pereiro (Phonak) was given the overall super-combativity award. The Souvenir Henri Desgrange given in honour of Tour founder Henri Desgrange to the first rider to pass the summit of the Col du Galibier on stage 11. This prize was won by Alexander Vinokourov.

Classification leadership by stage
Stage	Winner	General classification	Points classification	Mountains classification	Young rider classification	Team classification	Combativity award
1	~~David Zabriskie~~	~~David Zabriskie~~	~~David Zabriskie~~	no award	Fabian Cancellara	Team CSC	no award
2	Tom Boonen	~~David Zabriskie~~	Tom Boonen	Thomas Voeckler	Fabian Cancellara	Team CSC	Sylvain Calzati
3	Tom Boonen	~~David Zabriskie~~	Tom Boonen	Erik Dekker	Yaroslav Popovych	Team CSC	Erik Dekker
4	Discovery Channel	~~Lance Armstrong~~	Tom Boonen	Erik Dekker	Yaroslav Popovych	Team CSC	no award
5	Robbie McEwen	~~Lance Armstrong~~	Tom Boonen	Erik Dekker	Yaroslav Popovych	Team CSC	Juan Antonio Flecha
6	Lorenzo Bernucci	~~Lance Armstrong~~	Tom Boonen	Karsten Kroon	Yaroslav Popovych	Team CSC	Christophe Mengin
7	Robbie McEwen	~~Lance Armstrong~~	Tom Boonen	Fabian Wegmann	Yaroslav Popovych	Team CSC	Fabian Wegmann
8	Pieter Weening	~~Lance Armstrong~~	Tom Boonen	Michael Rasmussen	Vladimir Karpets	Team CSC	Pieter Weening
9	Michael Rasmussen	Jens Voigt	Tom Boonen	Michael Rasmussen	Vladimir Karpets	Team CSC	Michael Rasmussen
10	Alejandro Valverde	~~Lance Armstrong~~	Tom Boonen	Michael Rasmussen	Alejandro Valverde	Team CSC	Laurent Brochard
11	Alexander Vinokourov	~~Lance Armstrong~~	Tom Boonen	Michael Rasmussen	Alejandro Valverde	Team CSC	Alexander Vinokourov
12	David Moncoutié	~~Lance Armstrong~~	Thor Hushovd	Michael Rasmussen	Alejandro Valverde	Team CSC	David Moncoutié
13	Robbie McEwen	~~Lance Armstrong~~	Thor Hushovd	Michael Rasmussen	Yaroslav Popovych	Team CSC	Carlos Da Cruz
14	Georg Totschnig	~~Lance Armstrong~~	Thor Hushovd	Michael Rasmussen	Yaroslav Popovych	T-Mobile Team	Georg Totschnig
15	~~George Hincapie~~	~~Lance Armstrong~~	Thor Hushovd	Michael Rasmussen	Yaroslav Popovych	T-Mobile Team	Óscar Pereiro
16	Óscar Pereiro	~~Lance Armstrong~~	Thor Hushovd	Michael Rasmussen	Yaroslav Popovych	T-Mobile Team	Óscar Pereiro
17	Paolo Savoldelli	~~Lance Armstrong~~	Thor Hushovd	Michael Rasmussen	Yaroslav Popovych	~~Discovery Channel~~	Sébastien Hinault
18	Marcos Serrano	~~Lance Armstrong~~	Thor Hushovd	Michael Rasmussen	Yaroslav Popovych	T-Mobile Team	Carlos Da Cruz
19	Giuseppe Guerini	~~Lance Armstrong~~	Thor Hushovd	Michael Rasmussen	Yaroslav Popovych	T-Mobile Team	Sandy Casar
20	~~Lance Armstrong~~	~~Lance Armstrong~~	Thor Hushovd	Michael Rasmussen	Yaroslav Popovych	T-Mobile Team	no award
21	Alexander Vinokourov	~~Lance Armstrong~~	Thor Hushovd	Michael Rasmussen	Yaroslav Popovych	T-Mobile Team	Philippe Gilbert
Final		~~Lance Armstrong~~	Thor Hushovd	Michael Rasmussen	Yaroslav Popovych	T-Mobile Team	Óscar Pereiro

- In stage 1, Lance Armstrong wore the green jersey.

== Final standings ==
Legend
Green jersey	Denotes the leader of the points classification	Polka dot jersey	Denotes the leader of the mountains classification
White jersey	Denotes the leader of the young rider classification	A white jersey with a red number bib.	Denotes the winner of the super-combativity award

=== General classification ===
Final general classification (1–10)
Rank	Rider	Team	Time
DSQ	~~Lance Armstrong (USA)~~	~~Discovery Channel~~	~~86h 15' 02"~~
2	Ivan Basso (ITA)	Team CSC	+ 4' 40"
DSQ	~~Jan Ullrich (GER)~~	~~T-Mobile Team~~	~~+6' 21"~~
4	Francisco Mancebo (ESP)	Illes Balears–Caisse d'Epargne	+ 9' 59"
5	Alexander Vinokourov (KAZ)	T-Mobile Team	+ 11' 01"
DSQ	~~Levi Leipheimer (USA)~~	~~Gerolsteiner~~	~~+11' 21"~~
7	Michael Rasmussen (DEN)	Rabobank	+ 11' 33"
8	Cadel Evans (AUS)	Davitamon–Lotto	+ 11' 55"
9	Floyd Landis (USA)	Phonak	+ 12' 44"
10	Óscar Pereiro (ESP)	Phonak	+ 16' 04"

Final general classification (11–155)
Rank	Rider	Team	Time
11	Christophe Moreau (FRA)	Crédit Agricole	+ 16' 26"
12	Yaroslav Popovych (UKR)	Discovery Channel	+ 19' 02"
13	Eddy Mazzoleni (ITA)	Lampre–Caffita	+ 21' 06"
DSQ	~~George Hincapie (USA)~~	~~Discovery Channel~~	~~+23' 40"~~
15	Haimar Zubeldia (ESP)	Euskaltel–Euskadi	+ 23' 43"
16	Jörg Jaksche (GER)	Liberty Seguros–Würth	+ 24' 07"
17	Bobby Julich (USA)	Team CSC	+ 24' 08"
18	Óscar Sevilla (ESP)	T-Mobile Team	+ 27' 45"
19	Andrey Kashechkin (KAZ)	Crédit Agricole	+ 28' 04"
20	Giuseppe Guerini (ITA)	T-Mobile Team	+ 33' 02"
21	Carlos Sastre (ESP)	Team CSC	+ 34' 24"
22	Xabier Zandio (ESP)	Illes Balears–Caisse d'Epargne	+ 36' 20"
23	Leonardo Piepoli (ITA)	Saunier Duval–Prodir	+ 36' 20"
DSQ	~~Michael Boogerd (NED)~~	~~Rabobank~~	~~+ 38' 29"~~
25	Paolo Savoldelli (ITA)	Discovery Channel	+ 44' 30"
26	Georg Totschnig (AUT)	Gerolsteiner	+ 49' 14"
27	Mikel Astarloza (ESP)	AG2R Prévoyance	+ 54' 03"
28	Laurent Brochard (FRA)	Bouygues Télécom	+ 55' 29"
29	Sandy Casar (FRA)	Française des Jeux	+ 56' 47"
30	José Bento Azevedo (POR)	Discovery Channel	+ 59' 48"
31	Alberto Contador (ESP)	Liberty Seguros–Würth	+ 1h 03' 25"
32	Stefano Garzelli (ITA)	Liquigas–Bianchi	+ 1h 04' 49"
33	Chris Horner (USA)	Saunier Duval–Prodir	+ 1h 07' 57"
34	Stéphane Goubert (FRA)	AG2R Prévoyance	+ 1h 10' 53"
35	José Luis Rubiera (ESP)	Discovery Channel	+ 1h 11' 48"
36	Pietro Caucchioli (ITA)	Crédit Agricole	+ 1h 16' 21"
37	Maxim Iglinsky (KAZ)	Domina Vacanze	+ 1h 18' 44"
38	Jörg Ludewig (GER)	Domina Vacanze	+ 1h 19' 05"
39	Axel Merckx (BEL)	Davitamon–Lotto	+ 1h 20' 15"
40	Marcos Antonio Serrano (ESP)	Liberty Seguros–Würth	+ 1h 21' 31"
41	Michael Rogers (AUS)	Quick-Step–Innergetic	+ 1h 24' 32"
42	Alexandre Moos (SUI)	Phonak	+ 1h 25' 35"
43	Jérôme Pineau (FRA)	Bouygues Télécom	+ 1h 31' 38"
44	Cédric Vasseur (FRA)	Cofidis	+ 1h 33' 17"
45	Roberto Heras (ESP)	Liberty Seguros–Würth	+ 1h 38' 33"
46	Pierrick Fédrigo (FRA)	Bouygues Télécom	+ 1h 41' 14"
47	Franco Pellizotti (ITA)	Liquigas–Bianchi	+ 1h 41' 38"
48	Egoi Martínez (ESP)	Euskaltel–Euskadi	+ 1h 42' 29"
49	José Enrique Gutiérrez (ESP)	Phonak	+ 1h 42' 35"
50	Vladimir Karpets (RUS)	Illes Balears–Caisse d'Epargne	+ 1h 43' 45"
51	Santiago Botero (COL)	Phonak	+ 1h 49' 22"
52	Patrice Halgand (FRA)	Crédit Agricole	+ 1h 53' 26"
53	David Arroyo (ESP)	Illes Balears–Caisse d'Epargne	+ 1h 54' 12"
54	Dario David Cioni (ITA)	Liquigas–Bianchi	+ 2h 00' 39"
55	Daniele Nardello (ITA)	T-Mobile Team	+ 2h 02' 23"
56	Christophe Brandt (BEL)	Davitamon–Lotto	+ 2h 03' 10"
57	Matthias Kessler (GER)	T-Mobile Team	+ 2h 03' 56"
58	Sylvain Chavanel (FRA)	Cofidis	+ 2h 05' 20"
59	Patrik Sinkewitz (GER)	Quick-Step–Innergetic	+ 2h 07' 48"
60	Iban Mayo (ESP)	Euskaltel–Euskadi	+ 2h 07' 48"
61	Thomas Löfkvist (SWE)	Française des Jeux	+ 2h 07' 48"
62	Lorenzo Bernucci (ITA)	Fassa Bortolo	+ 2h 08' 37"
63	David Cañada (ESP)	Saunier Duval–Prodir	+ 2h 08' 56"
64	Ángel Vicioso (ESP)	Liberty Seguros–Würth	+ 2h 09' 37"
65	Sebastian Lang (GER)	Gerolsteiner	+ 2h 11' 18"
66	Juan Manuel Gárate (ESP)	Saunier Duval–Prodir	+ 2h 15' 17"
67	David Moncoutié (FRA)	Cofidis	+ 2h 15' 23"
68	Walter Bénéteau (FRA)	Bouygues Télécom	+ 2h 17' 06"
69	Iker Camaño (ESP)	Euskaltel–Euskadi	+ 2h 22' 41"
70	Philippe Gilbert (BEL)	Française des Jeux	+ 2h 24' 00"
71	Nicki Sørensen (DEN)	Team CSC	+ 2h 24' 08"
72	Pieter Weening (NED)	Rabobank	+ 2h 24' 16"
73	Juan Antonio Flecha (ESP)	Fassa Bortolo	+ 2h 24' 21"
74	José Luis Arrieta (ESP)	Illes Balears–Caisse d'Epargne	+ 2h 25' 27"
75	Joseba Beloki (ESP)	Liberty Seguros–Würth	+ 2h 26' 26"
76	Carlos Da Cruz (FRA)	Française des Jeux	+ 2h 26' 49"
77	Stuart O'Grady (AUS)	Cofidis	+ 2h 27' 19"
78	Andriy Hrivko (UKR)	Domina Vacanze	+ 2h 28' 08"
79	Fabian Wegmann (GER)	Gerolsteiner	+ 2h 29' 32"
80	Massimo Giunti (ITA)	Fassa Bortolo	+ 2h 29' 34"
81	Tobias Steinhauser (GER)	T-Mobile Team	+ 2h 31' 02"
82	Didier Rous (FRA)	Bouygues Télécom	+ 2h 33' 10"
83	Joost Posthuma (NED)	Rabobank	+ 2h 33' 59"
84	Allan Davis (AUS)	Liberty Seguros–Würth	+ 2h 34' 40"
85	Denis Menchov (RUS)	Rabobank	+ 2h 35' 00"
86	Stephan Schreck (GER)	T-Mobile Team	+ 2h 35' 52"
87	Gorazd Štangelj (SLO)	Lampre–Caffita	+ 2h 36' 13"
88	Nicolas Portal (FRA)	AG2R Prévoyance	+ 2h 38' 01"
89	Kurt Asle Arvesen (NOR)	Team CSC	+ 2h 39' 27"
90	Yuriy Krivtsov (UKR)	AG2R Prévoyance	+ 2h 39' 51"
91	Ronny Scholz (GER)	Gerolsteiner	+ 2h 43' 03"
92	Rubens Bertogliati (SUI)	Saunier Duval–Prodir	+ 2h 45' 03"
93	Beat Zberg (SUI)	Gerolsteiner	+ 2h 46' 24"
94	Francis Mourey (FRA)	Française des Jeux	+ 2h 47' 14"
95	Pavel Padrnos (CZE)	Discovery Channel	+ 2h 49' 53"
96	Ludovic Turpin (FRA)	AG2R Prévoyance	+ 2h 51' 28"
97	Anthony Geslin (FRA)	Bouygues Télécom	+ 2h 51' 58"
98	Alessandro Cortinovis (ITA)	Domina Vacanze	+ 2h 52' 02"
99	David Loosli (SUI)	Lampre–Caffita	+ 2h 52' 41"
100	Iñigo Landaluze (ESP)	Euskaltel–Euskadi	+ 2h 52' 41"
101	Salvatore Commesso (ITA)	Lampre–Caffita	+ 2h 53' 46"
102	Luke Roberts (AUS)	Team CSC	+ 2h 54' 12"
103	Bert Grabsch (GER)	Phonak	+ 2h 54' 35"
104	Volodymir Gustov (UKR)	Fassa Bortolo	+ 2h 54' 56"
105	Bradley McGee (AUS)	Française des Jeux	+ 2h 55' 59"
106	Sébastien Joly (FRA)	Crédit Agricole	+ 2h 56' 10"
107	Benjamín Noval (ESP)	Discovery Channel	+ 3h 00' 59"
108	Luis Leon Sánchez (ESP)	Liberty Seguros–Würth	+ 3h 03' 19"
109	Erik Dekker (NED)	Rabobank	+ 3h 03' 36"
110	Daniele Righi (ITA)	Lampre–Caffita	+ 3h 04' 17"
111	Bram Tankink (NED)	Quick-Step–Innergetic	+ 3h 05' 12"
112	Mario Aerts (BEL)	Davitamon–Lotto	+ 3h 07' 30"
113	Alessandro Bertolini (ITA)	Domina Vacanze	+ 3h 09' 13"
114	Samuel Dumoulin (FRA)	AG2R Prévoyance	+ 3h 11' 02"
115	Sébastien Hinault (FRA)	Crédit Agricole	+ 3h 14' 33"
116	Thor Hushovd (NOR)	Crédit Agricole	+ 3h 15' 40"
117	Laurent Lefèvre (FRA)	Bouygues Télécom	+ 3h 16' 06"
118	Giovanni Lombardi (ITA)	Team CSC	+ 3h 18' 21"
119	László Bodrogi (HUN)	Crédit Agricole	+ 3h 18' 44"
120	Matthieu Sprick (FRA)	Bouygues Télécom	+ 3h 20' 47"
121	Stéphane Augé (FRA)	Cofidis	+ 3h 21' 30"
122	Iñaki Isasi (ESP)	Euskaltel–Euskadi	+ 3h 21' 50"
123	Matthew White (AUS)	Cofidis	+ 3h 23' 41"
124	Thomas Voeckler (FRA)	Bouygues Télécom	+ 3h 25' 32"
125	Marcus Ljungqvist (SWE)	Liquigas–Bianchi	+ 3h 25' 36"
126	Simon Gerrans (AUS)	AG2R Prévoyance	+ 3h 27' 03"
127	Thierry Marichal (BEL)	Cofidis	+ 3h 30' 59"
128	Fabian Cancellara (SUI)	Fassa Bortolo	+ 3h 32' 40"
129	Frédéric Bessy (FRA)	Cofidis	+ 3h 34' 59"
130	Michael Rich (GER)	Gerolsteiner	+ 3h 37' 13"
131	Manuel Quinziato (ITA)	Saunier Duval–Prodir	+ 3h 37' 31"
132	Fred Rodriguez (USA)	Davitamon–Lotto	+ 3h 37' 58"
133	Alessandro Vanotti (ITA)	Domina Vacanze	+ 3h 38' 43"
134	Robbie McEwen (AUS)	Davitamon–Lotto	+ 3h 41' 52"
135	Karsten Kroon (NED)	Rabobank	+ 3h 42' 03"
136	Johan Vansummeren (BEL)	Davitamon–Lotto	+ 3h 43' 05"
137	Mauro Gerosa (ITA)	Liquigas–Bianchi	+ 3h 44' 22"
138	Nicolas Jalabert (FRA)	Phonak	+ 3h 44' 26"
139	Guido Trenti (USA)	Quick-Step–Innergetic	+ 3h 46' 24"
140	Marc Wauters (BEL)	Rabobank	+ 3h 46' 54"
141	Kjell Carlström (FIN)	Liquigas–Bianchi	+ 3h 47' 02"
142	Baden Cooke (AUS)	Française des Jeux	+ 3h 47' 17"
143	Bernhard Eisel (AUT)	Française des Jeux	+ 3h 47' 35"
144	Mauro Facci (ITA)	Fassa Bortolo	+ 3h 49' 30"
145	Michael Albasini (SUI)	Liquigas–Bianchi	+ 3h 51' 03"
146	Peter Wrolich (AUT)	Gerolsteiner	+ 3h 51' 50"
147	Rafael Nuritdinov (UZB)	Domina Vacanze	+ 3h 54' 14"
148	José Vicente Garcia (ESP)	Illes Balears–Caisse d'Epargne	+ 3h 56' 34"
149	Servais Knaven (NED)	Quick-Step–Innergetic	+ 3h 59' 07"
150	Unai Etxebarria (VEN)	Euskaltel–Euskadi	+ 4h 00' 24"
151	Robert Förster (GER)	Gerolsteiner	+ 4h 01' 40"
152	Daniel Becke (GER)	Illes Balears–Caisse d'Epargne	+ 4h 02' 16"
153	Janek Tombak (EST)	Cofidis	+ 4h 03' 09"
154	Wim Vansevenant (BEL)	Davitamon–Lotto	+ 4h 09' 25"
155	Iker Flores (ESP)	Euskaltel–Euskadi	+ 4h 20' 24"

=== Points classification ===
Final points classification (1–10)
Rank	Rider	Team	Points
1	Thor Hushovd (NOR)	Crédit Agricole	194
2	Stuart O'Grady (AUS)	Cofidis	182
3	Robbie McEwen (AUS)	Davitamon–Lotto	178
4	Alexander Vinokourov (KAZ)	T-Mobile Team	158
5	Allan Davis (AUS)	Liberty Seguros–Würth	130
6	Óscar Pereiro (ESP)	Phonak	118
7	Robert Förster (GER)	Gerolsteiner	101
DSQ	~~Lance Armstrong (USA)~~	~~Discovery Channel~~	~~93~~
9	Baden Cooke (AUS)	Française des Jeux	91
10	Bernhard Eisel (AUT)	Française des Jeux	88

=== Mountains classification ===
Final mountains classification (1–10)
Rank	Rider	Team	Points
1	Michael Rasmussen (DEN)	Rabobank	185
2	Óscar Pereiro (ESP)	Phonak	155
DSQ	~~Lance Armstrong (USA)~~	~~Discovery Channel~~	~~99~~
4	Christophe Moreau (FRA)	Crédit Agricole	93
DSQ	~~Michael Boogerd (NED)~~	~~Rabobank~~	~~90~~
6	Santiago Botero (COL)	Phonak	88
7	Alexander Vinokourov (KAZ)	T-Mobile Team	75
8	Laurent Brochard (FRA)	Bouygues Télécom	75
DSQ	~~George Hincapie (USA)~~	~~Discovery Channel~~	~~74~~
10	Pietro Caucchioli (ITA)	Crédit Agricole	73

=== Young rider classification ===
Final young rider classification (1–10)
Rank	Rider	Team	Time
1	Yaroslav Popovych (UKR)	Discovery Channel	86h 34' 04"
2	Andrey Kashechkin (KAZ)	Crédit Agricole	+ 9' 02"
3	Alberto Contador (ESP)	Liberty Seguros–Würth	+ 44' 23"
4	Maxim Iglinsky (KAZ)	Domina Vacanze	+ 59' 42"
5	Jérôme Pineau (FRA)	Bouygues Télécom	+ 1h 12' 36"
6	Vladimir Karpets (RUS)	Illes Balears–Caisse d'Epargne	+ 1h 24' 43"
7	David Arroyo (ESP)	Illes Balears–Caisse d'Epargne	+ 1h 35' 10"
8	Patrik Sinkewitz (GER)	Quick-Step–Innergetic	+ 1h 48' 46"
9	Thomas Löfkvist (SWE)	Française des Jeux	+ 1h 48' 46"
10	Philippe Gilbert (BEL)	Française des Jeux	+ 2h 04' 58"

=== Team classification ===
Final team classification (1–10)
Rank	Team	Time
1	T-Mobile Team	256h 10' 29"
2	Discovery Channel	+ 14' 57"
3	Team CSC	+ 25' 15"
4	Illes Balears–Caisse d'Epargne	+ 55' 24"
5	Crédit Agricole	+ 1h 06' 09"
6	Phonak	+ 1h 09' 20"
7	Liberty Seguros–Würth	+ 1h 47' 56"
8	Rabobank	+ 2h 26' 30"
9	Fassa Bortolo	+ 2h 48' 58"
10	AG2R Prévoyance	+ 2h 52' 04"

== See also ==
- List of doping cases in cycling

== Bibliography ==
- Augendre, Jacques (2016). "Guide historique" [Historical guide] (PDF). Tour de France (in French). Paris: Amaury Sport Organisation. Archived (PDF) from the original on 17 August 2016.
- "Race regulations" (PDF). Tour de France. Paris: Amaury Sport Organisation. 2005. Archived from the original (PDF) on 22 December 2005.
- Thompson, Christopher S. (2008). The Tour de France: A Cultural History. Oakland, California: University of California Press. ISBN 978-0-520-25630-9.
