= David Moncoutié =

French cyclist

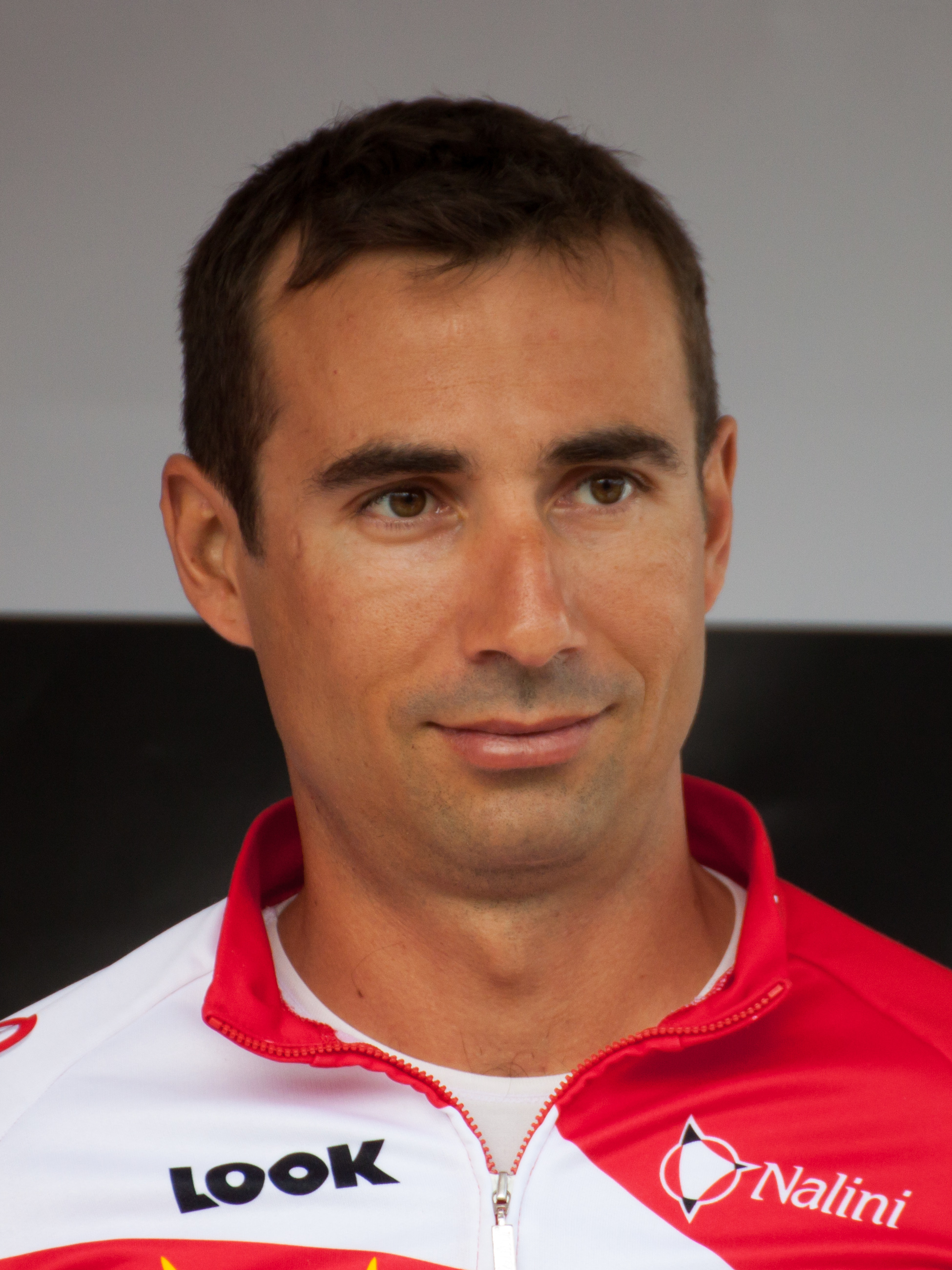
- Moncoutié at the 2012 Critérium du Dauphiné

Personal information
- Full name: David Moncoutié
- Nickname: Moncoucou
- Born: 30 April 1975 (age 51) Provins, France
- Height: 1.8 m (5 ft 11 in)
- Weight: 69 kg (152 lb)

Cycling career
- Sport: Cycling
- Discipline: Road
- Role: Rider
- Rider type: Climber

Amateur team
- 1996: VC Blagnac

Professional team
- 1997–2012: Cofidis

Major wins
- Grand Tours Tour de France 2 individual stages (2004, 2005) Vuelta a España Mountains Classification (2008–2011) 4 individual stages (2008–2011)

David Moncoutié (born 30 April 1975) is a retired French professional road racing cyclist, who rode with the French team Cofidis, for his entire professional career. He was a climber, and won his first professional race in a mountain stage of Critérium du Dauphiné Libéré. He won the Mountains Classification in Vuelta a España four times, one short of the record of five held by José Luis Laguía.

== Origins ==
David Moncoutié had no familial connection to cycling – he was raised in a football (soccer) loving family in which nobody had raced a bike. Moncoutié played football until he was 16 before being introduced to cycling by a friend. He gained his baccalauréat in biology. His father, mother and two sisters worked for the post office and wanted him to work there as well. Friends suggested he join them for a ride. He said: "They all had beautiful racing bikes, I had a sports bike that was nothing to talk about... and I dropped them right from the start. I said to myself,' Tiens, you're not going to be too bad!' and I joined the Entente Vélocipédique Bretenous-Bars, my village in the Lot. I won from my second race."

He continued playing football but abandoned it when cycling took over at 19. He had dreamed of winning a mountain stage in the Tour de France after watching the Colombian rider, Luis Herrera outride Europeans in the Tour in the 1980s. Moncoutié was a boy and thought anybody could turn up and ride the Tour. In 1995 he joined the club at Blagnac, the airport district of Toulouse where Airbus builds aircraft, and took his exams to join the rest of his family in the post office.

Since the start, for me cycling was all about pleasure. When I started I didn't think, for example, that one day I would ride the Tour de France. In a way, I am like a weekend cyclist who gets on his bike on a Saturday or a Sunday simply for the pleasure. OK, I suppose with age you start to assume a bit more responsibility and see it more like a job. But for me, the most important thing is that I enjoy it.

== Personality ==
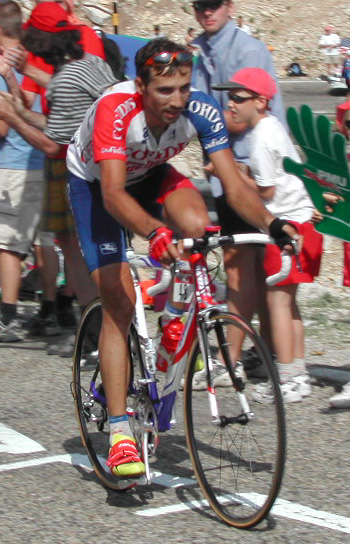
Moncoutie in 2002

He is known as a humble person, and many have compared his mentality to that of a recreational cyclist who enjoys riding his bicycle. In the past he has been criticised for lacking aggressiveness and for haplessness. For a while he was not able to put on a rain cape without having to put his feet on the ground.

The magazine Vélo said he had a "calm and a lucidity, a way of talking openly, something too of a rage hidden behind a smile, for him, a little painful."

He is known as a clean cyclist who relies on homeopathy. François Migraine of Cofidis said: "Everyone is more or less unanimous that David Moncoutié doesn't dabble [in drugs]. I would have 10 of him in the team if I could. He wins three races a year and he still manages to finish in the UCI's top 50. It goes to show that you don't have to dabble in drugs to have a career in cycling."

When Cofidis was at the centre of a doping scandal in 2004, one of those at the centre of events, Philippe Gaumont, wrote that Moncoutie did not follow most riders in taking drugs.

His team-mates have joked that while they are eager to try the latest and lightest equipment, Moncoutié would be happy riding on wooden wheels. Moncoutié said: "Equipment, even the latest technology, that's not my thing. What I like is to be on my bike and to ride. That's when I'm happy." His directeur sportif, Éric Boyer, said:

David is a loner. He's happy in a group but he doesn't need it to live. When I came to the team, I said to myself, as other people must have, that I was going to try to change him, to chivvy him up so that he got more involved, that he raised his ambitions. Today, I realise that even if I find one or two keys to open the door, I won't get very far. It doesn't interest him. He just wants to be left in peace.

== Professional racing ==
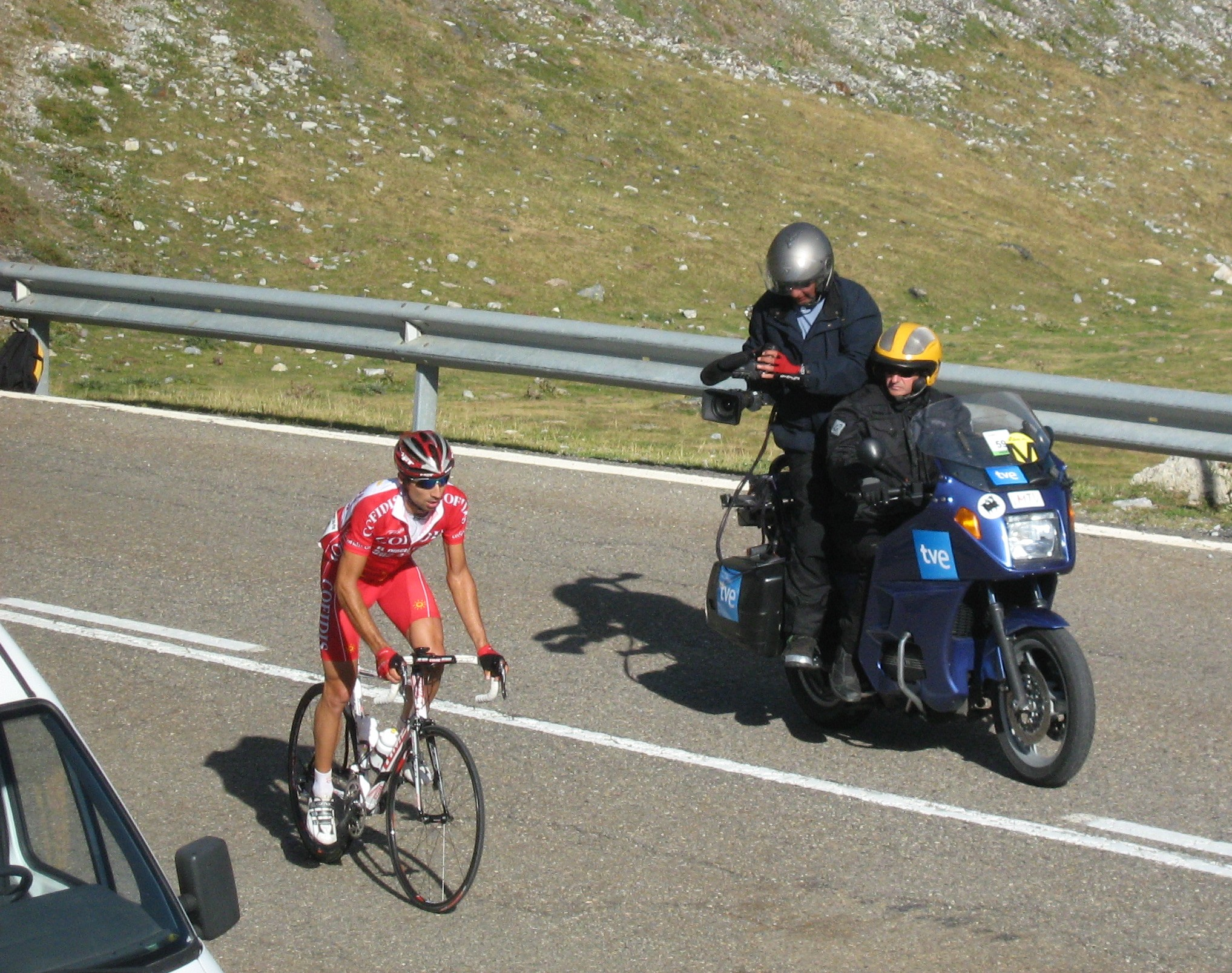
David Moncoutié on his way to winning the eighth stage of the 2008 Vuelta a España

He was seen at Blagnac by the team manager, Cyrille Guimard, who offered him a place at Cofidis, a French team sponsored by a money-lending company. He joined in 1997 and has ridden for the team ever since. Moncoutié said:

It was the day before the national éspoirs championship in 1996. I was an amateur with the VC Blagnac and doing my national service with the Joinville Battalion, but I'd never made much of an impact and I hadn't won the least international race. On the other hand, I had a small reputation as a climber. I'd spoken to Guimard a couple of times on the phone and he came to see me, a contract in his hand."

He finished 13th in the Tour de France in 2002, saying: "I'm not capable of following the leaders." He finished 43rd in 2003, shaken by the speed. He said:

That season, I won a stage of the Tour du Pays Basque, I came 13th in the Tour of Catalonia and sixth in the Dauphiné Libéré, so I said to myself 'Why not?' I was hoping to end up reasonably high in the general classification. But in the Tour, that's madness. From the Vosges, I realised that the best I could hope for was a stage. I've often heard it said that I could finish in the first five of the Tour de France. It's a dream! Me, I've never believed that. I've always fixed myself realisable objectives that matched my way of riding and my convictions.

His breakthrough was when he won a stage of the 2004 edition of Tour de France to Figeac. The following Tour de France he won the stage from Briançon to Digne-les-Bains on Bastille Day, guaranteeing him a place in the hearts of French fans. Moncoutié said: "A single stage, that could seem a bit thin but for me, that's enough. The emotion that I felt was enormous. In one day, I had saved my Tour." For the next twelve years, no French rider was able to repeat the feat of winning a Tour de France stage on the Bastille Day, until Warren Barguil did so in 2017.

He won a stage in the Critérium du Dauphiné Libéré in 1999, the Tour de l'Avenir in 2000, the Tour du Limousin (2001), the Critérium International (2002) and the Tour of the Mediterranean (2003). He won the 2010 Vuelta a España stage 8 in a mountaintop finishing in Xorret de Catí that included five mountain passes. He crossed the finish line solo and celebrated a prestigious victory.

== Career achievements ==
=== Major results ===
1999
1st Stage 6 Critérium du Dauphiné Libéré
2000
2nd Overall Tour de l'Avenir

1st Stage 7

2001
1st Stage 2 Tour du Limousin
4th Overall Paris–Nice
6th GP Ouest–France
9th Overall Tour de Romandie
2002
1st Overall Clasica de Alcobendas

1st Stage 2

3rd Overall Critérium International

1st Stage 2

2003
1st GP Lugano
1st Stage 4 Route du Sud
1st Stage 4 Tour Méditerranéen
8th Züri-Metzgete
8th Overall Tour de Romandie
2004
1st Stage 11 Tour de France (in Figeac)
2005
1st Stage 12 Tour de France (in Digne-les-Bains)
1st Stage 2 Tour of the Basque Country
1st Mountains classification, Paris–Nice
3rd Overall Volta a Catalunya
6th Clásica de San Sebastián
6th Overall Critérium du Dauphiné Libéré
2006
1st Mountains classification, Paris–Nice
2008
8th Overall Vuelta a España

1st Mountains classification
1st Stage 8

2009
Vuelta a España

1st Mountains classification
1st Stage 13

1st Stage 7 Critérium du Dauphiné Libéré
1st Stage 6 Tour Méditerranéen
2010
1st Overall Route du Sud

1st Stage 2b

Vuelta a España

1st Mountains classification
1st Stage 8

2011
1st Overall Tour Méditerranéen

1st Stage 5

1st Overall Tour de l'Ain
Vuelta a España

1st Mountains classification
1st Stage 11

6th Overall Tour du Haut Var
2012
6th Overall Vuelta Ciclista a la Comunidad de Madrid
7th Overall Rhône-Alpes Isère Tour

=== Grand Tour general classification results timeline ===
Grand Tour	2000	2001	2002	2003	2004	2005	2006	2007	2008	2009	2010	2011	2012
Giro d'Italia	—	—	—	—	—	—	—	—	—	—	68	—	—
Tour de France	75	48	13	43	34	67	57	—	41	56	—	39	DNF
Vuelta a España	—	—	—	—	—	—	—	—	8	27	14	37	109

Legend
—	Did not compete
DNF	Did not finish
