= Óscar Pereiro =

Spanish cyclist

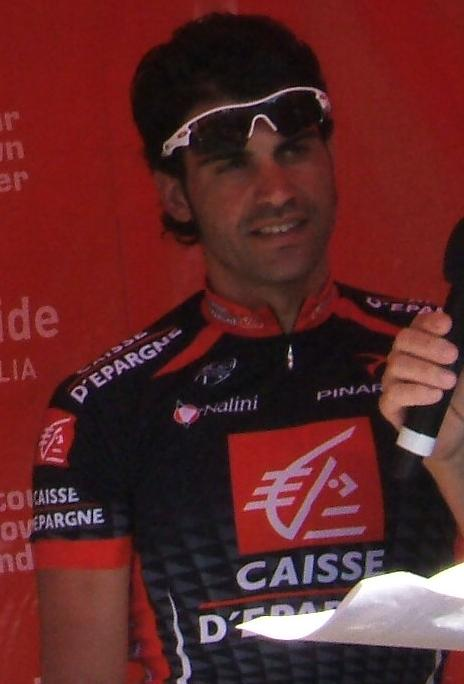
- Pereiro in 2009

Personal information
- Full name: Óscar Pereiro Sío
- Born: 3 August 1977 (age 49) Mos, Galicia, Spain
- Height: 1.77 m (5 ft 10 in)
- Weight: 67 kg (148 lb; 10 st 8 lb)

Cycling career
- Sport: Cycling
- Current team: Retired
- Discipline: Road
- Role: Rider
- Rider type: All-rounder

Professional teams
- 2000–2001: Gresco–Tavira
- 2002–2005: Phonak
- 2006–2009: Caisse d'Epargne–Illes Balears
- 2010: Astana

Major wins
- Grand Tours Tour de France General classification (2006) 1 individual stage (2005) Combativity award (2005)

Óscar Pereiro Sío (pronounced [ˈoskaɾ pe'rejro ˈsi.o]; born 3 August 1977) is a Spanish former professional road bicycle racer. Pereiro was declared the winner of the 2006 Tour de France, after the original winner Floyd Landis was disqualified for failing a doping test after his stage 17 victory. Pereiro is a former member of Porta da Ravessa (2000 to 2001), Phonak Hearing Systems (2002 to 2005), Caisse d'Epargne (2006 to 2009), and the Astana cycling team (2010). After retiring from cycling in 2010, Pereiro joined his local part-time football club Coruxo FC of the Segunda División B.

== Early career ==
Pereiro placed tenth in the 2004 Tour de France, 22 minutes 54 seconds behind original winner Lance Armstrong, who was subsequently disqualified. He was awarded the Most Aggressive Rider Award in the 2005 Tour de France after powering the winning breakaways in Stages 15, 16 and 19. He was the Stage 16 winner - just edging out Spain's Xabier Zandio, Italy's Eddy Mazzoleni and Australia's Cadel Evans. His efforts on Stage 15, the toughest stage of the Tour, were highly admired by the peloton. He finished second that day to Discovery Channel's George Hincapie after "pulling" for most of the final climb up the Pla D'Adet. In January 2014, Pereiro confessed on a radio show he sold this stage to Hincapie, making the deal some kilometers before arriving to the finish line.

Pereiro was considered a leader on Phonak along with Floyd Landis and Santiago Botero in 2005 - his last year riding for the team.

== 2006 Tour de France ==
His breakaway Stage 13 second-place finish (just behind Germany's Jens Voigt) gained him almost 30 minutes on most of the General classification leaders and propelled him into an unexpected yellow jersey. He traded the overall lead back and forth with Floyd Landis over the next few days before finally losing it to him for good on the second to last day of the Tour.

After hearing of Landis' positive "A" test, Pereiro stated that it was only an initial, unconfirmed result and he would not yet consider Landis guilty or himself the Tour winner. "I have too much respect for Landis to do otherwise", he said. After hearing that the Landis "B" test also came back positive, Pereiro stated that he now considers himself Tour champion and the Landis scandal should not diminish his own achievement. "Right now I feel like the winner of the Tour de France", Pereiro said. "It's a victory for the whole team."

On 20 September 2007 Landis was found guilty of doping and ordered that he forfeit his 2006 Tour de France victory, making Pereiro the official winner, but not before Pereiro had his own small doping issue (see the next section for more details).

== Landis' allegations of doping by Pereiro ==
In his 2010 interview with cycling journalist Paul Kimmage, Landis alleged Pereiro had engaged in doping both during the 2006 race and the year prior, when they raced in the same team. Explaining to Kimmage his satisfaction with his performance in the Stage 17 breakaway, he said, "I haven’t said this before because no one has asked, but if I had any reason to believe, and didn’t have specific knowledge that Pereiro was also doped, then I would have felt like I was cheating somebody - but I knew it, I had seen it first hand." He also told Kimmage that ahead of the penultimate stage of the 2006 Tour, a time trial, Pereiro had admitted to him about his upcoming planned blood transfusion for the race: "I know Pereiro, and I know he wasn’t going to have any new tricks that he hadn’t already tried so… I had talked to him about it, and he told me that he had another blood transfusion to do, but I still wasn’t concerned because I was a better time triallist than him regardless."

== Doping investigation ==
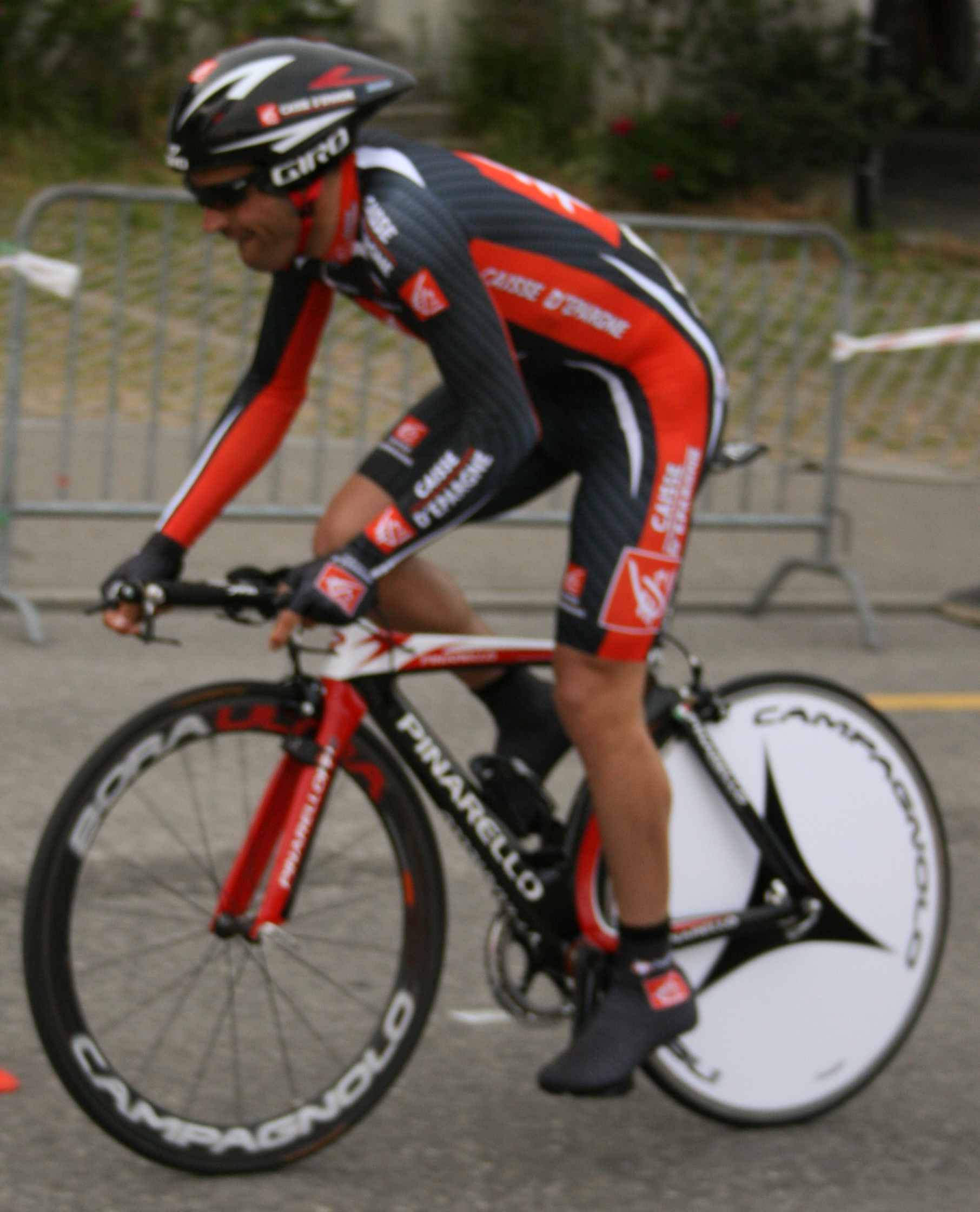
Pereiro at the 2007 Tour de Romandie

On 18 January 2007, French newspaper Le Monde reported that Pereiro had returned an "Adverse Analytical Finding" (AAF) during the 2006 Tour de France. It is alleged that a concentration of salbutamol in excess of the threshold of the allowed therapeutic use was found in two urine samples, produced after stages 14 (Montélimar - Gap, in which Pereiro finished 26th) and 16 (Bourg-d'Oisans - La Toussuire, 3rd place). In the latter stage, Pereiro retook the yellow jersey from Landis.

Salbutamol is commonly used to treat asthma symptoms, and is allowed to be used in cycle racing if the cyclist can provide a medical prescription for the substance. It is alleged that the International Cycling Union gave Pereiro retroactive permission to use the substance on medical grounds after the positive tests. The French anti-doping agency questions the veracity of the medical grounds. It demanded that Pereiro verify the grounds for the use of salbutamol within a week.

On 25 January 2007, France's anti-doping agency dropped its investigation, saying Pereiro provided sufficient justification for use of the asthma medication.

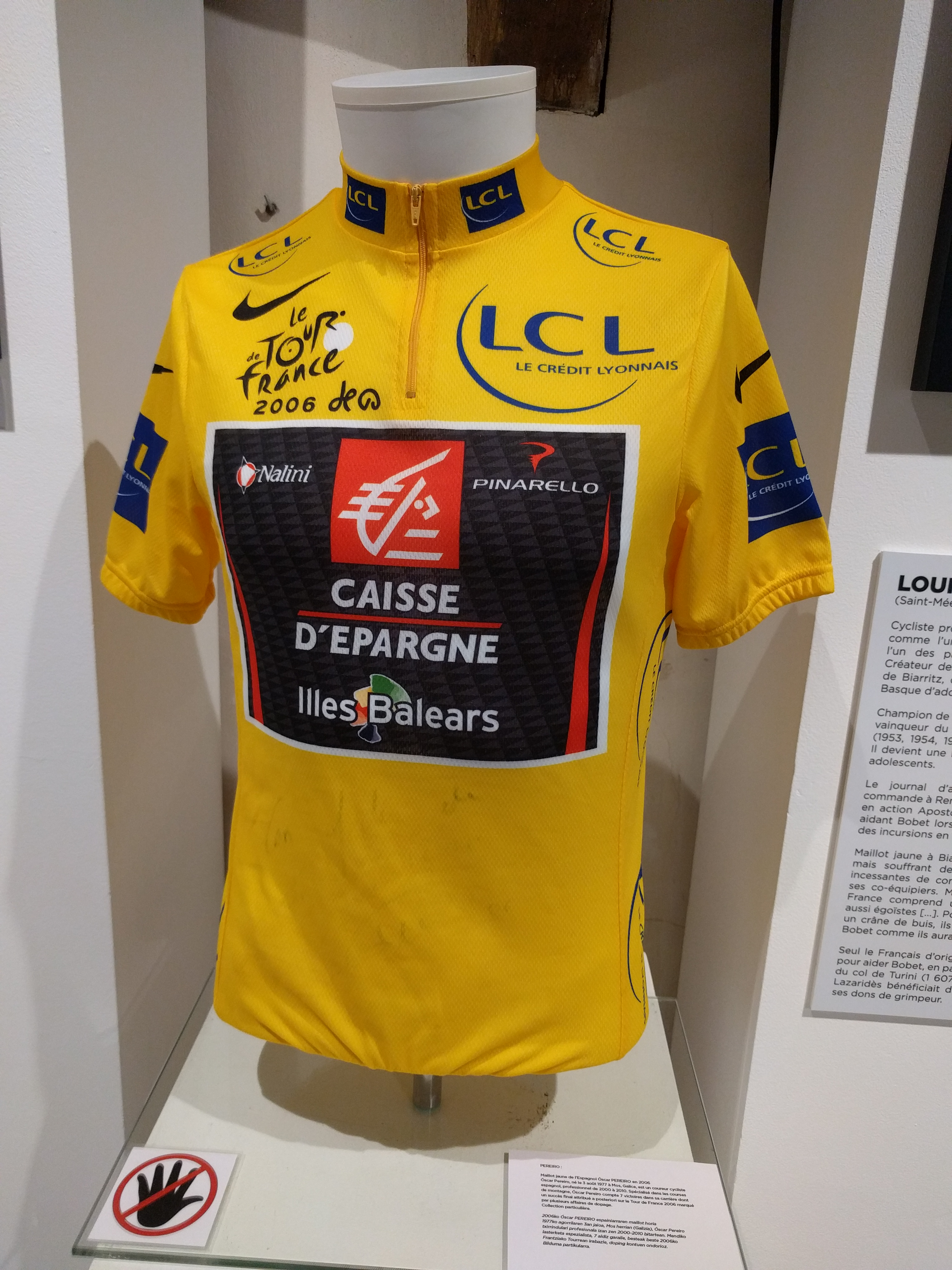
Pereiro's yellow jersey from the 2006 Tour de France

== Crash in 2008 Tour de France ==
On 20 July, during the 15th stage of 2008 Tour de France, Pereiro crashed at the 89 kilometre mark over a guardrail just prior to a hairpin turn during the descent of the Col Agnel landing on the other side of the turn, which meant the end of the Tour for him. Initially, he was thought to have broken his femur and arm, but later it was learned that this was not the case. He suffered a broken arm but never lost consciousness and was taken to a nearby hospital in Cuneo. During this Tour, Pereiro was working for Caisse d'Epargne team captain Alejandro Valverde but when it became clear in the Pyrenees that Valverde had lost too much time, he and Valverde managed to maintain placings in the top 20 riders.

== Football career ==
In December 2010 Pereiro announced that he signed with Segunda División B club Coruxo FC. He said that it was his childhood dream to become a professional footballer. Playing as a winger, he made two appearances for the team that season, scoring twice.

== Major results ==
=== Road ===
2001
6th Overall Grande Prémio Jornal de Notícias
7th Overall Volta ao Alentejo
2002
1st Stage 5 Setmana Catalana de Ciclisme
3rd Prueba Villafranca de Ordizia
5th Trofeo Calvià
2003
2nd Overall Vuelta a Burgos
3rd Overall Tour de Suisse

1st Stage 6

10th Overall Paris–Nice
2004
1st Classique des Alpes
7th Overall Paris–Nice
9th Overall Critérium du Dauphiné Libéré
10th Overall Tour de France
2005
6th Overall Tour of the Basque Country
7th Overall Tour de Romandie

1st Prologue

10th Overall Tour de France

1st Stage 16
Combativity award Overall

2006
1st Overall Tour de France
2007
1st Stage 1 (TTT) Volta a Catalunya
2nd Overall Tour du Limousin
6th Clásica a los Puertos de Guadarrama
10th Overall Tour de France
2008
3rd Road race, National Road Championships
2009
8th Overall Circuit de la Sarthe-Pays de la Loire

=== Grand Tour general classification results timeline ===
Grand Tour	2000	2001	2002	2003	2004	2005	2006	2007	2008	2009	2010
Giro d'Italia	—	—	11	—	—	—	—	—	—	—	—
Tour de France	—	—	—	—	10	10	1 (Note: Awarded after the disqualification of Floyd Landis)	10	DNF	DNF	—
/ Vuelta a España	—	—	30	17	—	26	49	DNF	—	—	—

Legend
—	Did not compete
DNF	Did not finish

=== Cyclo-cross ===
1998–1999
1st National Under-23 Championships
1999–2000
1st National Under-23 Championships
