= Lorenzo Bernucci =

Italian professional road bicycle racer

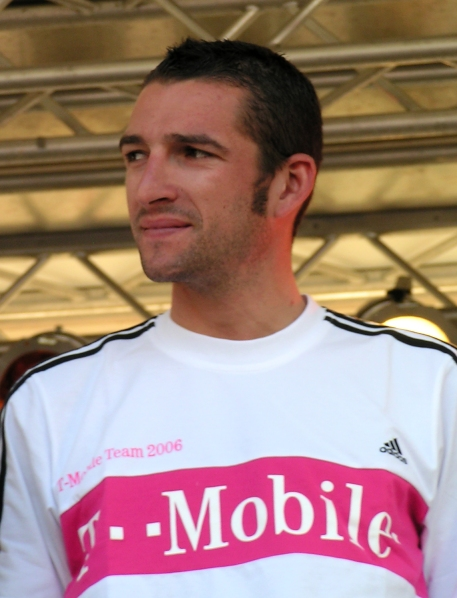

Personal information
- Full name: Lorenzo Bernucci
- Born: 15 September 1979 (age 47) Sarzana, Italy
- Height: 1.83 m (6 ft 0 in)
- Weight: 72 kg (159 lb; 11.3 st)

Cycling career
- Sport: Cycling
- Discipline: Road
- Role: Rider
- Rider type: All-rounder

Professional teams
- 2002–2004: Landbouwkrediet–Colnago
- 2005: Fassa Bortolo
- 2006–2007: T-Mobile Team
- 2009: LPR Brakes–Farnese Vini
- 2010: Lampre–Farnese Vini

Major wins
- 1 stage Tour de France (2005)

Lorenzo Bernucci (born 15 September 1979 in Sarzana) is an Italian former professional road bicycle racer. He rose to international prominence when he won stage 6 of the 2005 Tour de France, when riding for Fassa Bortolo.

== Career ==
He started his professional career with Landbouwkrediet–Colnago in 2002 before joining Fassa Bortolo in 2005. Upon Fassa's demise at the end of 2005, Bernucci secured a contract with T-Mobile. Bernucci was fired from T-Mobile in September 2007 after testing positive for Sibutramine. Bernucci admitted to taking the weight control drug and said he had been taking it for four years, unaware it had been added to the list of banned substances in 2006. T-Mobile judged he had broken the internal code of conduct so fire him immediately.

In February 2011, Bernucci was banned from cycling for five years. After his house was raided in 2010, prohibited substances were found and he was banned for 'the use or attempted use by an athlete of a prohibited substance or method, as well as the possession of prohibited substances'. Several members of his family were also banned for either three or four years due to their involvement.

== Major results ==
1999
3rd Gran Premio di Poggiana
2000
1st Gran Premio della Liberazione
1st Coppa Città di San Daniele
3rd Road race, UCI Under-23 Road World Championships
4th Trofeo Alcide Degasperi
2001
2nd Gran Premio di Poggiana
3rd Paris–Roubaix Espoirs
3rd Trofeo Piva
5th Liège–Bastogne–Liège U23
5th Trofeo Alcide Degasperi
7th GP Palio del Recioto
2002
3rd Overall Étoile de Bessèges
10th Giro del Piemonte
2003
5th Trofeo Città di Castelfidardo
8th Overall Étoile de Bessèges
2004
2nd Trofeo Laigueglia
6th Overall Tour du Poitou Charentes et de la Vienne
9th Giro delle Colline del Chianti
2005
1st Stage 6 Tour de France
2nd Tre Valli Varesine
3rd Züri-Metzgete
3rd GP Fred Mengoni
4th Overall Tour de Luxembourg
5th GP Città di Camaiore
5th Trofeo Città di Castelfidardo
8th Coppa Sabatini
8th Coppa Ugo Agostoni
2006
2nd Overall Sachsen-Tour
2nd Trofeo Magaluf-Palmanova
2007
6th Trofeo Sóller
7th Trofeo Pollença
8th Overall Danmark Rundt
2008
6th Firenze–Pistoia
2009
1st Stage 1 (TTT) Settimana Ciclistica Lombarda
4th Overall Giro della Provincia di Grosseto
8th Overall Giro di Sardegna
2010
8th Overall Giro della Provincia di Reggio Calabria

=== Grand Tour general classification results timeline ===
Grand Tour	2002	2003	2004	2005	2006	2007
Giro d'Italia	76	71	—	—	—	64
Tour de France	—	—	—	62	—	—
Vuelta a España	—	—	—	86	DNF	DNF

Legend
—	Did not compete
DNF	Did not finish

== See also ==
- List of sportspeople sanctioned for doping offences
- List of doping cases in cycling
