= Doping at the 2007 Tour de France =

Drug use affecting the cycle race

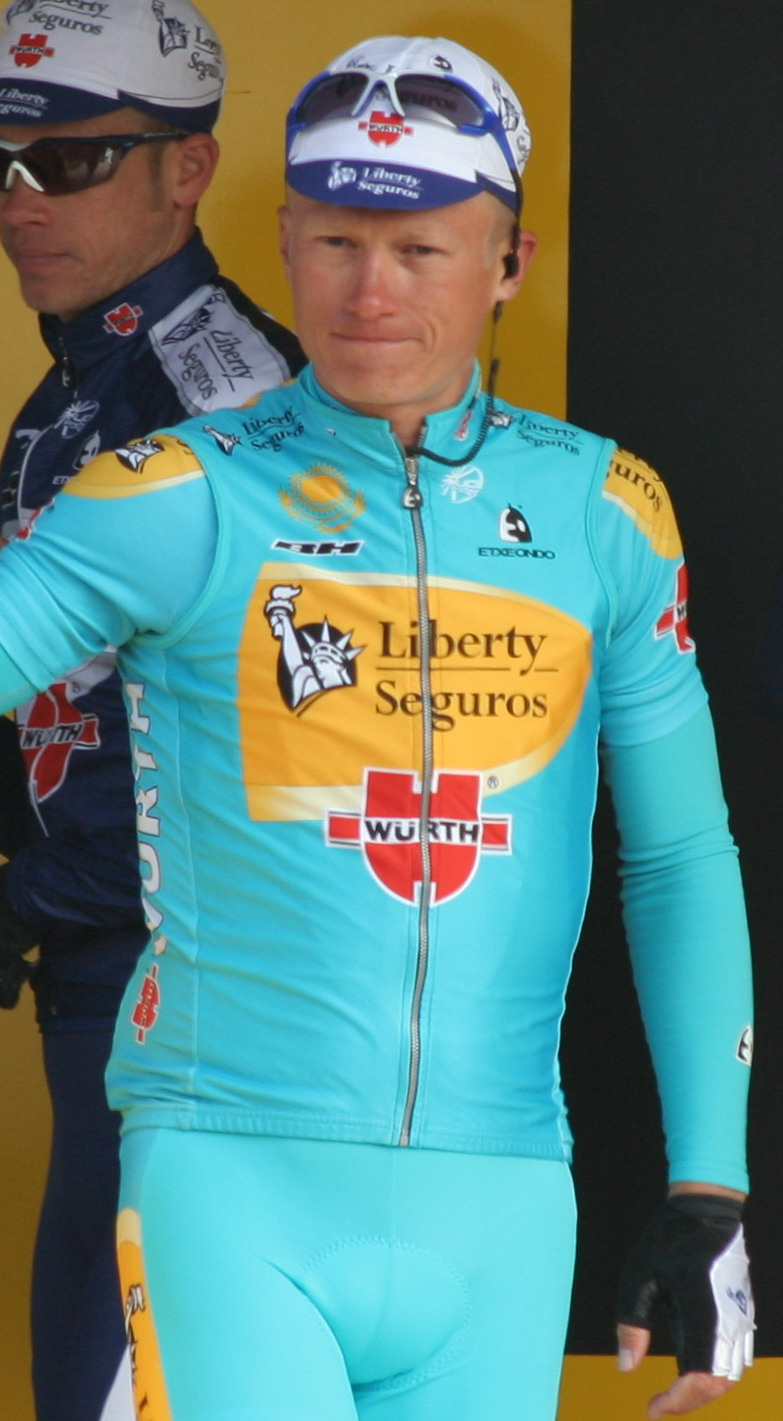
Alexander Vinokourov, pictured in 2006, tested positive for doping during the 2007 Tour.

The 2007 Tour de France was affected by a series of scandals and speculations related to doping. By the end of the Tour, two cyclists were dismissed for failing tests and the wearer of the yellow jersey was voluntarily retired by his team for lying about his whereabouts and missing doping tests. A fourth rider was confirmed to having used doping while in a training session prior to the 2007 Tour and a fifth rider failed tests late in the race, with his result being officially announced just after the end of the Tour. During the competition, two teams were asked to withdraw after at least one member was found to have doped.

The events generated criticism and a general distrustful attitude toward the sport of professional cycling from media and public opinion. The doping allegations also resulted in several team sponsors threatening to retire their support if events advanced further. Some media such as German TV channels ARD and ZDF left the Tour once the first scandals broke. Following the Tour's conclusion, the sport's governing bodies spoke out about ways to combat the prevalence of doping in cycling and key team sponsors elected to withdraw their support due to the reputational damage caused by the scandals. The 2007 Tour de France has been referred to as one of the most controversial Tours. After the end of the Tour, The Times of London ranked it 4th in its list of the top 50 sporting scandals.

== Background ==
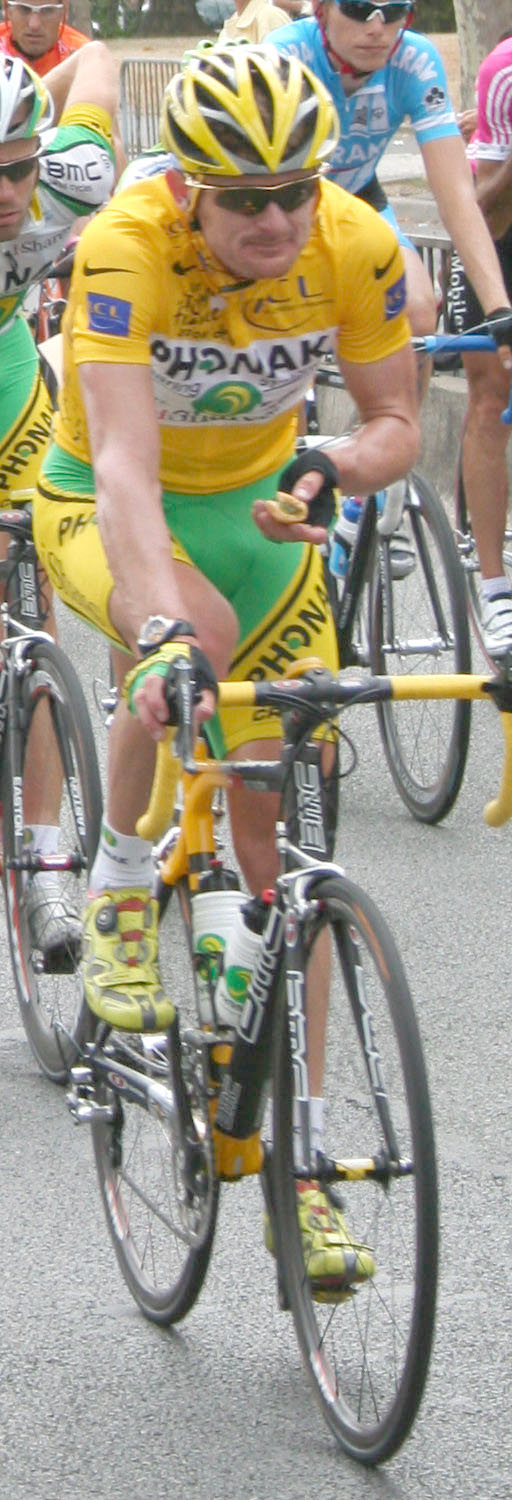
Floyd Landis on the 2006 Tour de France

Since the introduction of doping tests in 1964, many cyclists were caught in the Tour de France. In recent years, 1996 Tour de France winner Bjarne Riis and points classification winner Erik Zabel, along with most of their Team Telekom team-mates, confessed to using erythropoietin (EPO). In 1997, former points classification winner Djamolidine Abdoujaparov was disqualified from the Tour de France for doping use. In 1998, the Festina affair had several main contenders removed from the race. In the next years, several riders were removed from the Tour de France for doping (see List of doping cases in cycling).

In addition, several riders were not allowed to start the previous Tour, including Jan Ullrich and Ivan Basso because of their involvement in the Operación Puerto doping case, a Spanish investigation against doctor Eufemiano Fuentes and a number of accomplices accused of administering prohibited doping products to approximately two hundred professional athletes, to enhance their performance.

After the completion of the 2006 Tour, winner Floyd Landis was found to have an elevated testosterone to epitestosterone ratio on a sample taken following Stage 17 of the race, and at the time of the 2007 Tour prologue. Since the results of an independent arbitration hearing were still pending Landis was prevented from defending his title. He was stripped of his 2006 Tour title in September 2007.

== Events immediately before the Tour ==
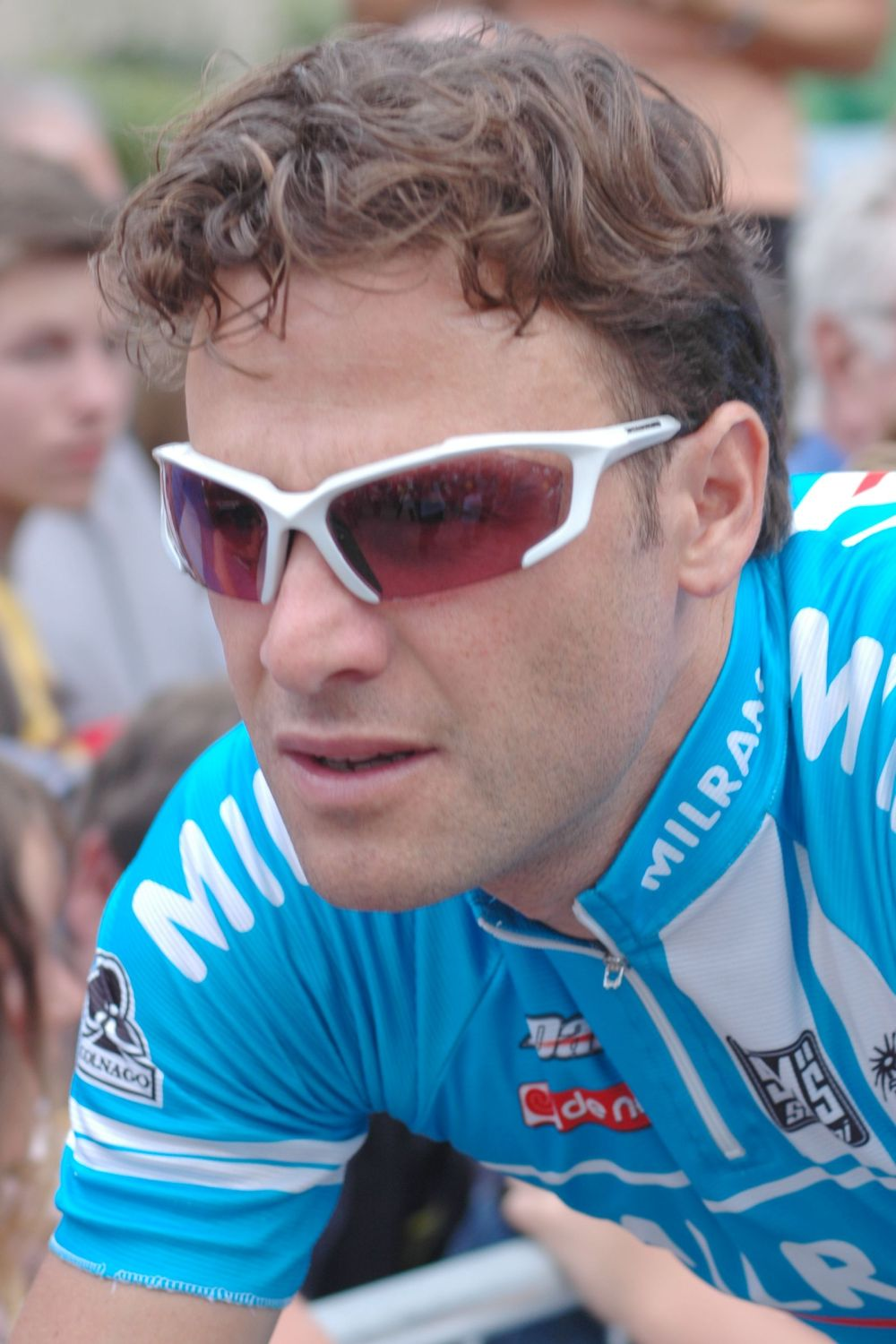
Alessandro Petacchi

Alessandro Petacchi, a sprint specialist, failed a test for salbutamol at Pinerolo on 23 May in the 2007 Giro d'Italia, the same day he claimed the third of his five-stage wins in the event. As a result, Petacchi, an asthma sufferer, was suspended by Team Milram and forced to miss the Tour de France because of the charges. Though he seemed cleared of the charges at one point, he was later suspended for one year.

On May 24, riders Erik Zabel and Rolf Aldag had earlier admitted to using banned blood booster EPO in the mid-1990s.

On May 25, Bjarne Riis admitted he had won the overall competition of the 1996 edition under the effects of performance-enhancing drugs, claiming "for a time [doping] was a part of everyday life for me", and he was later stripped of the title by the Tour owner ASO. Five other former Telekom teammates were also implicated in doping. However the stripping of Riis' 1996 Tour title was later reinstated with the UCI overruling the ASO claiming Riis was protected by a 10 year statute of limitations (even though Lance Armstrong was later stripped of all his TDF wins despite some of them being more than 10 years earlier).

Other high-profile potential Tour riders were caught up in doping controversies. Giro d'Italia winner Danilo Di Luca remained under investigation and 2006 Giro winner Ivan Basso was banned for two years on 15 June for his part in events uncovered by Operación Puerto.

== During the Tour ==
Despite Petacchi's failed test result prior to the Tour prologue, the first stages were uneventful in terms of doping allegations. It was not until Stage 8 before the first doping allegations surfaced against one of the participants. German cyclist Patrik Sinkewitz failed tests for elevated levels of testosterone at a June 8, 2007 pre-Tour training camp. Immediately prior to Stage 12, reports began to surface that the then current race leader, Michael Rasmussen had been dropped by the Danish Cycling Union in the month prior to the Tour following claims he had missed three out-of-competition doping tests. Tour director Christian Prudhomme nevertheless allowed the rider to continue in the absence of a failed test result.

Days later on 24 July, pre-race favourite Alexander Vinokourov was withdrawn from the Tour after Stage 15. Vinokourov had returned a failed A test for an illegal blood transfusion from a compatible donor before the Stage 13 individual time trial on July 21, in which he placed first. In addition to Vinokourov, who was in 23rd place overall, the entire Astana Team was forced to withdraw, affecting highly placed riders such as 5th placed Andreas Klöden and 8th placed Andrey Kashechkin.

The following day, after finishing Stage 16, which had begun with a protest by riders, it emerged that Italian cyclist Cristian Moreni had failed tests for testosterone after Stage 11, in which he finished 102nd. He was immediately pulled out of the race by his team, Cofidis (who had participated in the day's protest). Team Cofidis then voluntarily retired the rest of their riders from the Tour.

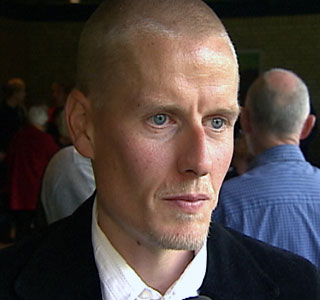
Michael Rasmussen

On 25 July Michael Rasmussen won Stage 16; with a three-minute lead, he appeared all but certain to win the Tour the next day. However, hours after his victory, Rasmussen's team, Rabobank, abruptly pulled Rasmussen from the Tour and sacked him for a violation of the team's internal rules. The Danish rider had given incorrect information to Rabobank's sports director about his whereabouts which followed on from earlier reports that he had missed previous out-of-competition doping control tests.

With the sport reeling from the revelations, the Tour continued as allegations began to surface regarding new race leader Alberto Contador (see Alberto Contador below). While no further rider or team withdrawals occurred before the race's conclusion in Paris, it later emerged that two more riders Andrey Kashechkin and Iban Mayo had failed tests for doping during the Tour's later stages.

== Reaction to events during the Tour ==
Prior to Rasmussen's exit, the doping revelations of Sinkewitz and Vinokourov had been met with defiance by the UCI, the Tour organizers and the majority of the European press (with certain exceptions) however, with Rasmussen's sacking whilst wearing the yellow jersey (no rider had previously been withdrawn from the race while leading), the mood became more pessimistic, with the exception of Tour director Christian Prudhomme who publicly regarded the Dane's withdrawal as "the best thing that can happen to the Tour. The race will go on for the rest of the riders and we believe it would be an insult to them to stop the race. We believe the general classification is much better now than it was."

Prudhomme's reaction was in contrast to the French newspapers. France Soir ran a mock death notice declaring the Tour had died "at age 104, after a long illness." Declaring further: "The Tour is clinically dead. It is a broken toy, a burst soap bubble popped by careless kids, unaware that they are damaging themselves, their health and their childhood dreams as well...It's all the more painful as we had almost begun to believe in the Tour again... in these soap-and-water cyclists who we were so ready to love. But instead of dreams, the last 48 hours have been a living nightmare."

A similar editorial in Le Figaro announced: "It really doesn't matter who wins the Tour. The 2007 edition died on 24 July on the heights of Loudenvielle...Killed by Alexander Vinokourov, idolised by the media and cycling fans, but revealed to have the blood of another running in his veins on the finishing line. Damn Vinokourov! He sullied the infinite beauty of the Pyrenees, dirtied cycling a little more and further discredited the Tour de France."

Another French newspaper, Libération's editorial demanded "The Tour must be stopped", describing the procession of cyclists as a "caravan of ridicule".

The British popular media who had previously acclaimed the success of the Tour's prologue in London and the first stage through Kent, were similarly critical calling it the Tour de Farce (Daily Mirror) and declaring it a "Corrupt race populated by a cast of frauds heading straight into the gutter" (The Times). Swiss newspaper Tages-Anzeiger reduced its coverage of the race in protest to minimal reporting of results and full reporting of any doping stories.

German television broadcasters ARD and ZDF stopped covering the race (after they vowed to in the Tour prelude) when Patrik Sinkewitz was revealed to have failed tests following Stage 8; Sat 1 and Pro Sieben replaced them as the German rightsholders. Most other media decided to stay, and some even criticised the German decision.

Sponsors similarly indicated their unwillingness to continue to support a sport dogged by scandal, most noticeably Gerolsteiner and T-Mobile (the latter subsequently withdrew from sponsoring cycling later in the year). Team Rabobank's head of sponsorship Heleen Crielaard reacted to the Rasmussen dismissal stating: "We are a bank and we want to be reliable. One thing we definitely do not appreciate is lying..." although denied suggestions that they had influenced the decision to sack the rider.

Despite calls for the Tour to be cancelled mid-race, the race continued principally on the basis that the race itself and its history is bigger than individual events.

UCI director Pat McQuaid urged team directors and the riders to take responsibility:

"The teams need to have more control over their riders.."They are the ones who need to clean out the riders who are iffy, they need to ensure they can guarantee that everyone of their riders is riding clean and riding fairly. The evidence is that most of the time these riders are dealing with individuals from outside their team and the sport whether it be pseudo doctors and chemists who are promising them things. That has got to stop. More and more riders...are speaking out and it's the younger generation of riders coming in that are going to be the future of the sport. They have to come into a system that is completely ethically correct. But at the end of the day, the rider is the one who makes the decisions..We are in the process of changing that culture and it will change in time. We need to weed out the bad apples. I hope next year we have a Tour de France with no positive tests. We've had two bad Tour de Frances, we cannot afford a third."

Eddy Merckx who had won the Tour on five occasions, commented: "my heart is no longer in it" in response to his support for the Tour. Another Belgian rider Johan Museeuw (who had previously received a two-year ban for doping), suggested doping and drug use were a possible consequence of the difficulty of riding the Tour in its current format. Questioning why stages had to be so long and including several arduous 'out-of-category' mountain climbs. Following Vinokourov's exit, Patrice Clerc president of Tour organisers Amaury Sport Organisation (ASO) stated: "I am not downcast and I am all the more determined to go all the way in this fight...It may seem paradoxical but we are closing in on victory. I have been saying we have started a merciless war against doping...We live in dark times and it is out of the question to give up, it is out of the question to leave the place to those who cheat." Particularly strong reaction came from Jean-François Lamour, vice president of the World Anti-Doping Agency who called for the Tour de France to be banned entirely and for road cycling to be withdrawn from the Olympic Games and former British Olympic Association chairman Sir Craig Reedie suggested that road cyclists might be required to hold an "anti-doping passport".

French Prime Minister François Fillon attempted to stem the tide of negativity stating: "Obviously this gives a disastrous image of the Tour de France, but at the same time, if we encourage the organisers, we can clean up French sports and in particular cycling"; whilst Nicolas Sarkozy, the French president, demonstrated support by joining the Tour and following the race leaders in the Tour director's car.

Prior to Stage 16 a group of riders from eight teams – six from France plus German outfits Team Gerolsteiner and T-Mobile Team – forming the Mouvement pour un cyclisme crédible (or Movement for Credible Cycling), delayed the start of the Tour by thirteen minutes asking for all teams to abide by their good behaviour charter of 2005, under which teams are requested to avoid fielding riders implicated in doping affairs. The protest was in obvious contrast to the 1998 reaction which was at odds with authorities, protesting at the heavy-handed treatment of riders.

Tour riders generally remained encouraged however. Fabian Cancellara, Cedric Vasseur and David Millar all stated publicly that they believed the consensus among riders in the peloton was that anti-doping measures were effective and the sport would continue to benefit from the harder line.

== Riders who failed tests ==
=== Patrik Sinkewitz ===
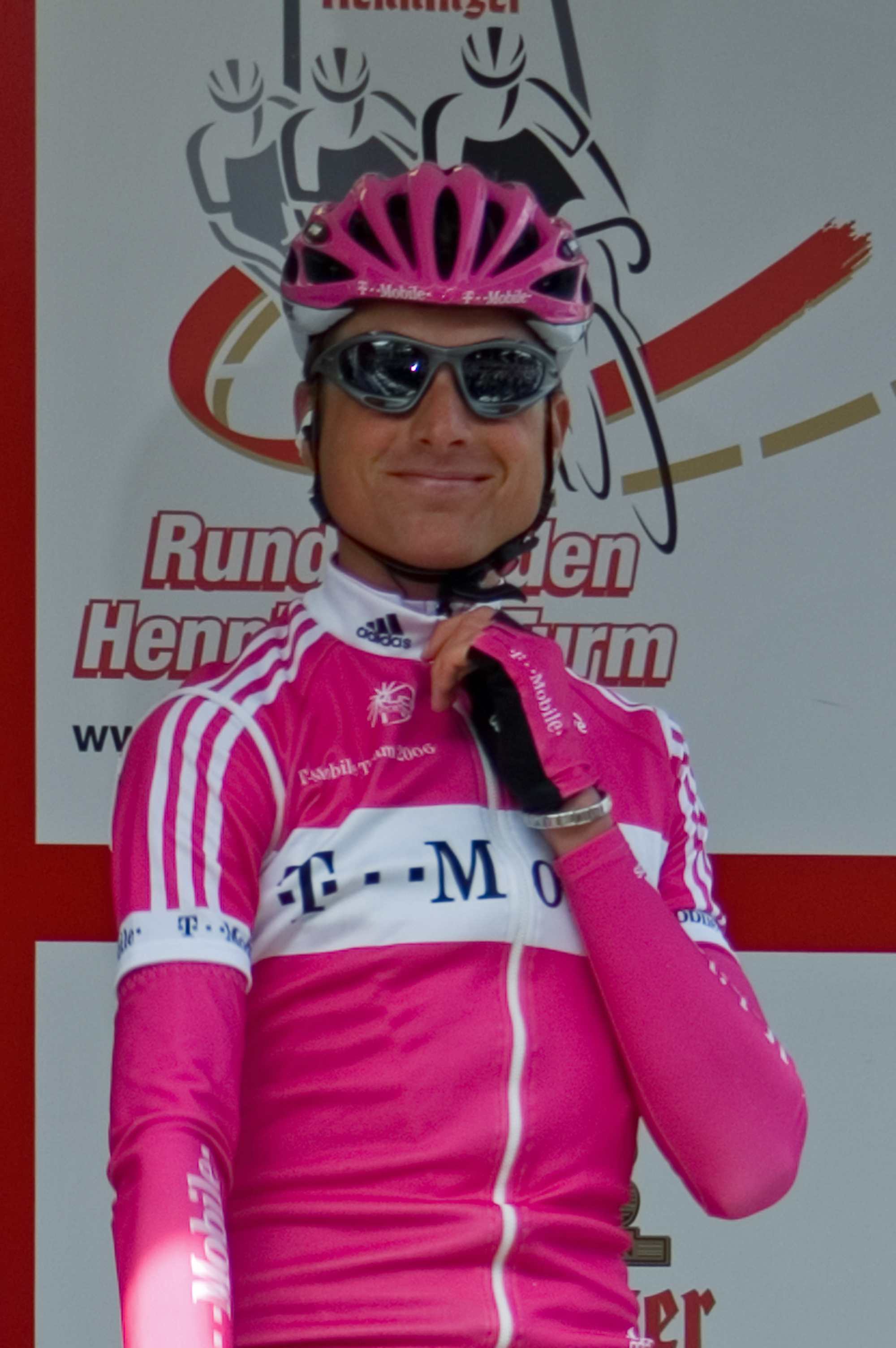
Patrik Sinkewitz at the Henninger Turm 2006

Despite the rider's failed test result relating to a pre-Tour training camp, Sinkewitz competed in the race until Stage 8, when he collided with a spectator and withdrew from the event, at which point the test result emerged. Sinkewitz initially denied the allegation and called for his B sample to be tested. German television withdrew from covering the Tour in protest when his failed test came to light. On 31 July Sinkewitz subsequently retracted his denial and confessed to using a testosterone gel on his upper arms whilst training. Accepting the failed test result, Sinkewitz stated that: "It was a big mistake and irresponsible toward my team, colleagues, the sponsor and the whole of cycling." T-Mobile responded to the admission by sacking Sinkewitz with immediate effect.

=== Alexander Vinokourov ===
Alexander Vinokourov began the Tour as one of the favourites. Vinokourov's A test revealed two different types of red blood cells in his circulatory system indicating he had a blood transfusion prior to the stage. A blood transfusion is meant to increase the number of red blood cells in the body, improving oxygen flow from the lungs to the muscles. Vinokourov rejected the failed test, blaming the anomaly on excessive blood flow in his thighs following a heavy collision earlier in the Tour. Accordingly, he asked for his B sample to be tested; however, the lab test for locating blood cells from another donor in "old fashioned" homologous transfusions is considered fool-proof. It was later revealed that he had also failed tests on his win of stage 15, and that his B sample had since returned "non-negative". Astana responded by sacking Vinokourov.

=== Cristian Moreni ===
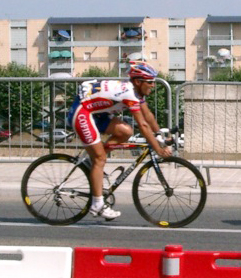
Cristian Moreni

Cofidis rider Moreni was placed 54th at the time he was withdrawn from the Tour and had participated in the rider protest prior to Stage 16. His failed test related to Stage 11 and Moreni decided not to ask for his B sample to be tested, admitting to doping according to Cofidis team manager Éric Boyer.

=== Iban Mayo ===
Spanish cyclist Iban Mayo was tested for doping on the second rest day, on July 24. The test failed for EPO after the Tour's conclusion. He was subsequently suspended by his team Saunier Duval–Prodir. Mayo had previously failed tests for a high testosterone-to-epitestosterone ratio during the 2007 Giro d'Italia, but on that occasion UCI found that he had not breached any doping regulation. Mayo placed 16th overall in the 2007 Tour. It later emerged in October 2007 that Mayo's B-sample would be re-tested after results from a laboratory in Ghent returned inconclusive results.

== Other affected riders ==
=== Michael Rasmussen ===
Despite being tested negative for doping before the Tour and seventeen times during the Tour, Michael Rasmussen was pulled from the race for violating team rules. According to Rabobank, he had told the UCI and the team that he was training in Mexico from June 4 to June 26, 2007. Italian cycling journalist and former cyclist Davide Cassani told a Danish television channel that he had seen Rasmussen on June 13 and 14 in the Dolomites in Italy. When Rabobank team director Theo de Rooij confronted Rasmussen with this story, according to news reports he allegedly admitted the lie. Rasmussen denied admitting this, however and told a Dutch newspaper (Algemeen Dagblad) "My career is ruined". According to Team Rabobank spokesman Jacob Bergsma, when sponsor Rabobank learned of Rasmussen's deceit, they insisted that he be sent home immediately.

Rasmussen had previously been given two warnings from UCI and two warnings from Anti Doping Denmark for missing out-of-competition doping controls. Three warnings from either organization would have landed him with a ban. The warnings had no immediate consequences, but cast a cloud of doubt about whether Rasmussen was doping.

Michael Rasmussen's withdrawal came immediately after his dramatic victory in Stage 16, defending multiple attacks from Alberto Contador on a gruelling mountain pass. At the time he was holding the yellow jersey, leading the race by three minutes and ten seconds, and he appeared well on his way to winning the Tour.

Over three months later on 8 November, Danish newspapers reported that Rasmussen had admitted misleading the UCI as to his whereabouts, an offence that carries a penalty of two years suspension.

=== Alberto Contador ===
Alberto Contador was not allowed to start in the 2006 Tour de France due to his possible involvement with the Operación Puerto doping case in which he had been referred to by key persons who were the subject of investigation. He was subsequently cleared and allowed to start in 2007, going on to win the Tour. Contador signed a commitment in which he stated: "I am not involved in the Puerto affair nor in any other doping case". But according to documents obtained by the French newspaper Le Monde, he was still involved in the Puerto affair and therefore should not have been allowed to start the 2007 Tour. Since Contador was the only rider able to stay with Rasmussen on two arduous stages in the Alps and Pyrenees, several journalists focused on his relationship with Eufemiano Fuentes and his role in Operación Puerto, without uncovering new evidence. Contador was tested five times during the Tour, and no discrepancies were reported.

After the Tour, German doping expert Werner Franke, who had complete access to Puerto documents, accused him of having taken drugs in the past. On August 10, in response to increasing suspicion about links to the Operación Puerto blood-doping ring alleged by Franke, Alberto Contador publicly declared himself a clean rider: "I have never doped and I have never participated in an act of doping", said Contador, reading from a prepared statement. "I won the Tour clean. I cannot understand the attacks against by people that don't even know me. My commitment is absolute and I will always be ready to collaborate in the fight against doping." Contador was joined by Discovery Channel team manager Johan Bruyneel, Spanish sports minister Jaime Lissavetzky and members of his family.

Contador failed tests for clenbuterol in the 2010 Tour de France and was subsequently suspended from cycling for two years.

== Other developments ==
In addition to the sacking and resignations of a number of riders (see above) it was announced on 31 July that Team Astana had suspended team activities for one month, stating that: "Following recent events, we have decided to stop our activities until the end of August...This period of time will be the opportunity for deep questioning." and two weeks after the Tour had finished it emerged that team-rider Andrej Kashechkin had also failed doping tests. The Astana team were later banned from entering the next Grand Tour of the season, the 2007 Vuelta a España (or Tour of Spain) as a direct result of the failed doping tests of three of the team's riders.

On 3 August Team Rabobank's general director, Theo de Rooij announced his resignation from the team as a consequence of the events.

Both Michael Rasmussen and Alberto Contador were excluded from the Hamburg Cyclassics race later in the month after the Tour due to continuing allegations linking both riders to doping.

As well as the international media, professional riders and sponsors, a number of organisations involved with the Tour and professional cycling made statements about the future of the sport and the impact of doping. The Discovery Channel Team subsequently announced they would be disbanding at the end of the 2007 season citing the "situation in the sport" at the time as one of the factors in their failure to find new sponsors. Later in the year T-Mobile confirmed they would withdraw from sponsoring professional cycling in order to distance themselves from doping scandals which included Patrik Sinkewitz's failed test result in the 2007 Tour and previous admissions of doping by former T-Mobile team riders including Bjarne Riis.

In an interview broadcast in September 2007, president of the UCI Pat McQuaid referring to the Tour events, called for the then-current two-year ban for first-time doping offenders to be increased to a life ban in an effort to deter doping activity. The statement marked a shift in policy as the president had previously (during the Tour) expressed a belief that a two-year ban was sufficient.

On February 13, 2008, the ASO announced that the Astana team, despite completely changing its ownership, management, and rider roster since the 2007 scandals, would be barred from the 2008 Tour due to its involvement in the 2007 scandals and its links to Operación Puerto. The move meant that neither Contador, the 2007 winner, nor third-place Levi Leipheimer, both of whom signed with the revamped Astana setup, were able to compete in the 2008 tour.

== See also ==
- Doping at the Tour de France
- Doping (sport)
- Blood doping
- List of doping cases in cycling
