= 2007 Tour de France, Stage 11 to Stage 20 =

Staage of cycle race

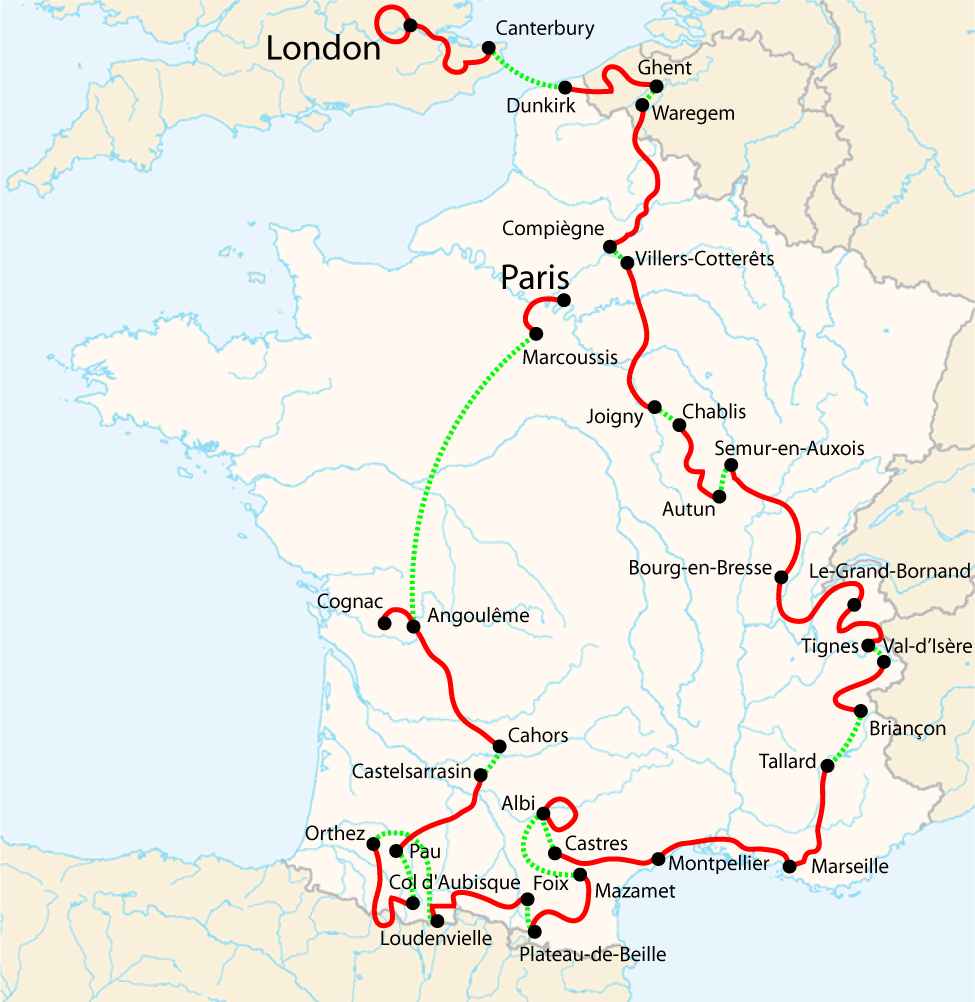
Stages in 2007

These are the profiles for the individual stages in the 2007 Tour de France, with Stage 11 on 19 July, and Stage 20 on 29 July.

== Stage 11 ==
2007-07-19 — Marseille – Montpellier, 182.5 km

This was the first of two transition stages between the Alps and the Pyrenees, with no climbs.

Robbie Hunter took the stage when he powered for the line and held off Fabian Cancellara after a number of sprinters crashed in the final kilometre on a tight corner.

French favourite Christophe Moreau finished more than three minutes after the leaders. He was caught napping when Astana hit the front shortly after going through the feed zone in Arles. Despite the best efforts of his AG2R team Moreau could not bridge the gap, which increased steadily as the leaders set a relentless pace. On a day in which no movement was expected at the top of the General Classification, Moreau, who crashed early in the stage, slipped from sixth to 14th after coming in three minutes 20 seconds back.

Michael Rasmussen kept clear of danger on the 182.5 km flat route from Marseille to Montpellier to maintain his hold on the yellow jersey. And it looked as if Tom Boonen would tighten his grip on the green jersey with Erik Zabel off the pace, but the Belgian lost momentum on the fringes of the crash in the final kilometre and eventually came home 37th. New Zealander Julian Dean hit the deck along with Iker Camaño, Sebastien Hinault, Marcel Sieberg and Fränk Schleck.

Stage 11 result

| Rank | Rider | Team | Time |
|---|---|---|---|
| 1 | Robert Hunter (RSA) | Barloworld | 3h 47' 50" |
| 2 | Fabian Cancellara (SUI) | Team CSC | s.t. |
| 3 | Murilo Fischer (BRA) | Liquigas | s.t. |
| 4 | Filippo Pozzato (ITA) | Liquigas | s.t. |
| 5 | Alessandro Ballan (ITA) | Lampre–Fondital | s.t. |
| 6 | Paolo Bossoni (ITA) | Lampre–Fondital | s.t. |
| 7 | Claudio Corioni (ITA) | Lampre–Fondital | s.t. |
| 8 | Philippe Gilbert (BEL) | Française des Jeux | s.t. |
| 9 | William Bonnet (FRA) | Crédit Agricole | s.t. |
| 10 | Kim Kirchen (LUX) | T-Mobile Team | s.t. |

General classification after stage 11

| Rank | Rider | Team | Time |
|---|---|---|---|
| 1 | Michael Rasmussen (DEN) | Rabobank | 53h 11' 45" |
| 2 | Alejandro Valverde (ESP) | Caisse d'Epargne | + 2' 35" |
| 3 | Iban Mayo (ESP) | Saunier Duval–Prodir | + 2' 39" |
| 4 | Cadel Evans (AUS) | Predictor–Lotto | + 2' 41" |
| 5 | Alberto Contador (ESP) | Discovery Channel | + 3' 08" |
| 6 | Carlos Sastre (ESP) | Team CSC | + 3' 39" |
| 7 | Andreas Klöden (GER) | Astana | + 3' 50" |
| 8 | ~~Levi Leipheimer (USA)~~ | ~~Discovery Channel~~ | ~~+ 3' 53"~~ |
| 9 | Kim Kirchen (LUX) | T-Mobile Team | + 5' 06" |
| 10 | Mikel Astarloza (ESP) | Euskaltel–Euskadi | + 5' 20" |

== Stage 12 ==
2007-07-20 — Montpellier – Castres, 178.5 km

This was another transition stage heading west to Castres, with a category 2 climb just 40 km from the finish. The terrain was expected to offer some opportunities for the attackers but ending in a sprint at the finish line.

The first attack of the day to get away happened at about the 52 km mark when Amets Txurruka and Pierrick Fédrigo broke away from the peloton. A couple of chases, including a solo effort by Marcus Burghardt, briefly got away but were soon reeled in by the peloton.

Shortly after the descent from the category 2 climb near the finish, the pace set by Française des Jeux and Lampre–Fondital at the front of the peloton, in an effort to catch Txurruka and Fédrigo, became so blisteringly fast that some riders willingly dropped off the back of the peloton, knowing that by dropping off so close to the finish line they would not risk being disqualified.

Txurruka and Fédrigo proved much more difficult to catch than first thought; as the peloton neared them within 10 km to the finish line, it was calculated that the catch would occur between 2 and 3 km to the line. The two valiantly fought on and wound up being caught just as the peloton reached the 1 km to go mark, leading to a classic bunched sprint at the finish, where the top three men in the points classification standings were the first three to the line.

Stage 12 result

| Rank | Rider | Team | Time |
|---|---|---|---|
| 1 | Tom Boonen (BEL) | Quick-Step–Innergetic | 4h 25' 32" |
| 2 | Erik Zabel (GER) | Team Milram | s.t. |
| 3 | Robert Hunter (RSA) | Barloworld | s.t. |
| 4 | Daniele Bennati (ITA) | Lampre–Fondital | s.t. |
| 5 | Thor Hushovd (NOR) | Crédit Agricole | s.t. |
| 6 | Bernhard Eisel (AUT) | T-Mobile Team | s.t. |
| 7 | Sébastien Chavanel (FRA) | Française des Jeux | s.t. |
| 8 | Nicolas Jalabert (FRA) | AG2R Prévoyance | s.t. |
| 9 | Robert Förster (GER) | Gerolsteiner | s.t. |
| 10 | Andrey Kashechkin (KAZ) | Astana | s.t. |

General classification after stage 12

| Rank | Rider | Team | Time |
|---|---|---|---|
| 1 | Michael Rasmussen (DEN) | Rabobank | 57h 37' 10" |
| 2 | Alejandro Valverde (ESP) | Caisse d'Epargne | + 2' 35" |
| 3 | Iban Mayo (ESP) | Saunier Duval–Prodir | + 2' 39" |
| 4 | Cadel Evans (AUS) | Predictor–Lotto | + 2' 41" |
| 5 | Alberto Contador (ESP) | Discovery Channel | + 3' 08" |
| 6 | Carlos Sastre (ESP) | Team CSC | + 3' 39" |
| 7 | Andreas Klöden (GER) | Astana | + 3' 50" |
| 8 | ~~Levi Leipheimer (USA)~~ | ~~Discovery Channel~~ | ~~+ 3' 53"~~ |
| 9 | Kim Kirchen (LUX) | T-Mobile Team | + 5' 06" |
| 10 | Mikel Astarloza (ESP) | Euskaltel–Euskadi | + 5' 20" |

== Stage 13 ==
2007-07-21 — Albi, 54 km (ITT)

This was the first individual time trial since the prologue and was relatively flat with a twisty downhill finish.

An early downpour of rain saturated the road and made for dangerous conditions for many of the early riders. Reigning world time trial champion (and winner of the Prologue time trial) Fabian Cancellara had extreme difficulty negotiating a right-hand turn around the 30 km mark and lost most of his speed, before eventually crashing and losing a great deal of time. Others also fell at this turn.

Cofidis' Bradley Wiggins rode through the rain to set the first time to beat, that stood for most of the day. Alexander Vinokourov lead at every time check and shattered Wiggins' final time by more than two minutes. It is likely, however, that his performance was aided by drugs.

General classification leader Michael Rasmussen was expected to lose a great deal of time, having had one of the worst time trials ever for a top-flight professional in the 2005 Tour de France. He finished 11th originally, much better than expected, and was upgraded to 10th when Vinokourov was disqualified, though his own premature exit from the Tour days later casts doubt on this performance.

The rain let up by the time there were about 40 riders left to leave the starthouse, though the course still remained more treacherous than it would have been had the day been completely dry.

Vinokourov originally won the stage in 1h 06'34", but on April 30, 2008, he was officially stripped of the victory due to his subsequent positive test for blood doping.

Stage 13 result

| Rank | Rider | Team | Time |
|---|---|---|---|
| DSQ | ~~Alexander Vinokourov (KAZ)~~ | ~~Astana~~ | 1h 06' 34" |
| 1 | Cadel Evans (AUS) | Predictor–Lotto | 1h 07' 48" |
| 2 | Andreas Klöden (GER) | Astana | + 25" |
| 3 | Andrey Kashechkin (KAZ) | Astana | + 30" |
| 4 | Bradley Wiggins (GBR) | Cofidis | + 1' 00" |
| 5 | Yaroslav Popovych (UKR) | Discovery Channel | + 1' 02" |
| 6 | Alberto Contador (ESP) | Discovery Channel | + 1' 04" |
| 7 | Sylvain Chavanel (FRA) | Cofidis | + 1' 24" |
| DSQ | ~~Levi Leipheimer (USA)~~ | ~~Discovery Channel~~ | ~~+ 1' 25"~~ |
| 8 | Mikel Astarloza (ESP) | Euskaltel–Euskadi | + 1' 28" |
| 9 | Michael Rasmussen (DEN) | Rabobank | + 1' 41" |

General classification after stage 13

| Rank | Rider | Team | Time |
|---|---|---|---|
| 1 | Michael Rasmussen (DEN) | Rabobank | 58h 46' 39" |
| 2 | Cadel Evans (AUS) | Predictor–Lotto | + 1' 00" |
| 3 | Alberto Contador (ESP) | Discovery Channel | + 2' 31" |
| 4 | Andreas Klöden (GER) | Astana | + 2' 34" |
| 5 | ~~Levi Leipheimer (USA)~~ | ~~Discovery Channel~~ | ~~+ 3' 37"~~ |
| 6 | Andrey Kashechkin (KAZ) | Astana | + 4' 23" |
| 7 | Carlos Sastre (ESP) | Team CSC | + 4' 45" |
| 8 | Mikel Astarloza (ESP) | Euskaltel–Euskadi | + 5' 07" |
| 9 | Alexander Vinokourov (KAZ) | Astana | + 5' 10" |
| 10 | Kim Kirchen (LUX) | T-Mobile Team | + 5' 29" |

== Stage 14 ==
2007-07-22 — Mazamet – Plateau-de-Beille, 197 km

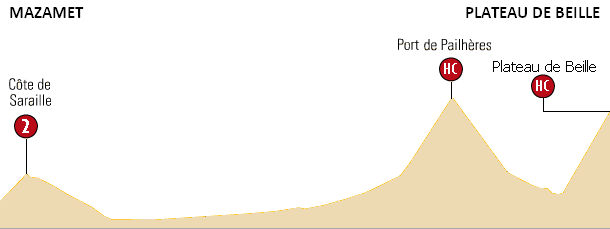
Stage 14 layout.

The race headed into the Pyrenees. This stage started with a category 2 climb out of Mazamet and then followed a relatively calm route via Carcassonne, Limoux and Quillan before taking on the Port de Pailhères (17 km at 7.2%) and a very difficult finish at Plateau-de-Beille (16 km at 7.9%).

A six-man breakaway formed out of a group that at first numbered 27. That 27-man group featured race leader Michael Rasmussen and his King of the Mountains rival Mauricio Soler. The six who went forward attained a maximum advantage before the Saunier Duval and Rabobank squads set to reeling them in. Their pace proved fast enough that the autobus formed almost immediately as the peloton started the ascent up the Port de Pailhères.

More splits occurred on the later climbs in the course, with the yellow jersey group, paced by Rasmussen's teammates, numbering some 45 riders for most of the stage.

Rasmussen attacked on the ascent to the Plateau-de-Beille, and only Alberto Contador could stay with him. They caught every member of the leading break. Soler had earlier taken the lead in the King of the Mountains, but Rasmussen retook it at the Plateau-de-Beille, though Contador outsprinted Rasmussen to the finish line.

Stage 14 result

| Rank | Rider | Team | Time |
|---|---|---|---|
| 1 | Alberto Contador (ESP) | Discovery Channel | 5h 25' 48" |
| 2 | Michael Rasmussen (DEN) | Rabobank | s.t. |
| 3 | Mauricio Soler (COL) | Barloworld | + 37" |
| DSQ | ~~Levi Leipheimer (USA)~~ | ~~Discovery Channel~~ | ~~+ 40"~~ |
| 4 | Carlos Sastre (ESP) | Team CSC | + 53" |
| 5 | Andreas Klöden (GER) | Astana | + 1' 52" |
| 6 | Cadel Evans (AUS) | Predictor–Lotto | + 1' 52" |
| 7 | Antonio Colom (ESP) | Astana | + 2' 23" |
| 8 | Andrey Kashechkin (KAZ) | Astana | + 2' 23" |
| 9 | Yaroslav Popovych (UKR) | Discovery Channel | + 3' 06" |

General classification after stage 14

| Rank | Rider | Team | Time |
|---|---|---|---|
| 1 | Michael Rasmussen (DEN) | Rabobank | 64h 12' 15" |
| 2 | Alberto Contador (ESP) | Discovery Channel | + 2' 23" |
| 3 | Cadel Evans (AUS) | Predictor–Lotto | + 3' 04" |
| 4 | ~~Levi Leipheimer (USA)~~ | ~~Discovery Channel~~ | ~~+ 4' 29"~~ |
| 5 | Andreas Klöden (GER) | Astana | + 4' 38" |
| 6 | Carlos Sastre (ESP) | Team CSC | + 5' 50" |
| 7 | Andrey Kashechkin (KAZ) | Astana | + 6' 58" |
| 8 | Mikel Astarloza (ESP) | Euskaltel–Euskadi | + 8' 25" |
| 9 | Alejandro Valverde (ESP) | Caisse d'Epargne | + 9' 45" |
| 10 | Yaroslav Popovych (UKR) | Discovery Channel | + 10' 55" |

== Stage 15 ==
2007-07-23 — Foix – Loudenvielle, 196 km

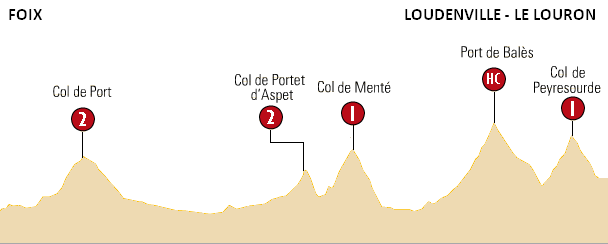
Stage 15 layout.

This was thought to be one of the major stages of the Tour, with no fewer than five major mountain passes – including the Col de Port, the Col de Portet d'Aspet (5.7 km climb at 6.9%), the Col de Menté (7.0 km climb at 8.1%), the Port de Balès (19.5 km at 6.2%), (the first time this climb was featured in the Tour), and finally the Col de Peyresourde (9.7 km climb at 7.8%) with a downhill finish in Loudenvielle.

An early 2-man break was joined by a 23-man chase group to form a leading group of 25 that represented 17 teams. Notables in this group included Alexander Vinokourov, the original stage winner, Kim Kirchen, was upgraded to the stage victory upon Vinokourov's disqualification, and Haimar Zubeldia, whose second place on the stage vaulted him into the top ten in the General Classification, as well as George Hincapie, Denis Menchov, and Bernhard Kohl.

Many splits occurred on the way up the Col de Peyresourde, with Vinokourov taking a quick 30 second lead over his breakaway mates, holding on to that advantage to be the original stage winner. Michael Rasmussen and Alberto Contador traded attack after attack from the group they had been in, catching most of the early break, finishing in the top ten of the stage, and gaining time over other contenders such as Cadel Evans, Levi Leipheimer, Andreas Klöden, and Carlos Sastre, who were left in the remnants of the group they had left.

Vinokourov originally won the stage in 5h 34'28", but on April 30, 2008, he was formally stripped of the victory due to his positive test for blood doping the next day.

Stage 15 result

| Rank | Rider | Team | Time |
|---|---|---|---|
| DSQ | ~~Alexander Vinokourov (KAZ)~~ | ~~Astana~~ | 5h 34' 28" |
| 1 | Kim Kirchen (LUX) | T-Mobile Team | 5h 35' 19" |
| 2 | Haimar Zubeldia (ESP) | Euskaltel–Euskadi | s.t. |
| 3 | Juan José Cobo (ESP) | Saunier Duval–Prodir | + 7" |
| 4 | Juan Manuel Gárate (ESP) | Quick-Step–Innergetic | + 1' 23" |
| 5 | David Arroyo (ESP) | Caisse d'Epargne | + 2' 32" |
| 6 | Bernhard Kohl (AUT) | Gerolsteiner | + 3' 34" |
| 7 | Christian Vande Velde (USA) | Team CSC | + 3' 34" |
| 8 | Ludovic Turpin (FRA) | AG2R Prévoyance | + 4' 25" |
| 9 | Alberto Contador (ESP) | Discovery Channel | + 4' 40" |
| 10 | Michael Rasmussen (DEN) | Rabobank | + 4' 40" |

General classification after stage 15

| Rank | Rider | Team | Time |
|---|---|---|---|
| 1 | Michael Rasmussen (DEN) | Rabobank | 69h 52' 14" |
| 2 | Alberto Contador (ESP) | Discovery Channel | + 2' 23" |
| 3 | Cadel Evans (AUS) | Predictor–Lotto | + 4' 00" |
| 4 | ~~Levi Leipheimer (USA)~~ | ~~Discovery Channel~~ | ~~+ 5' 25"~~ |
| 5 | Andreas Klöden (GER) | Astana | + 5' 34" |
| 6 | Carlos Sastre (ESP) | Team CSC | + 6' 46" |
| 7 | Haimar Zubeldia (ESP) | Euskaltel–Euskadi | + 7' 27" |
| 8 | Andrey Kashechkin (KAZ) | Astana | + 7' 54" |
| 9 | Kim Kirchen (LUX) | T-Mobile Team | + 8' 24" |
| 10 | Mikel Astarloza (ESP) | Euskaltel–Euskadi | + 9' 21" |

== Rest day 2 ==
2007-07-24

News of a failed blood doping test by Astana rider Alexander Vinokourov after Stage 15 filtered through late on Monday evening. On Tuesday, the rest day, Marc Biver announced that the entire Astana squad remaining in the Tour would be withdrawn. Two of their riders, Andreas Klöden (5th) and Andrey Kashechkin (8th), were in the top 10. This altered the general classification standings.

Corrected General classification after stage 15

| Rank | Rider | Team | Time |
|---|---|---|---|
| 1 | Michael Rasmussen (DEN) | Rabobank | 69h 52' 14" |
| 2 | Alberto Contador (ESP) | Discovery Channel | + 2' 23" |
| 3 | Cadel Evans (AUS) | Predictor–Lotto | + 4' 00" |
| 4 | ~~Levi Leipheimer (USA)~~ | ~~Discovery Channel~~ | ~~+ 5' 25"~~ |
| 5 | Carlos Sastre (ESP) | Team CSC | + 6' 46" |
| 6 | Haimar Zubeldia (ESP) | Euskaltel–Euskadi | + 7' 27" |
| 7 | Kim Kirchen (LUX) | T-Mobile Team | + 8' 24" |
| 8 | Mikel Astarloza (ESP) | Euskaltel–Euskadi | + 9' 21" |
| 9 | Alejandro Valverde (ESP) | Caisse d'Epargne | + 10' 41" |
| 10 | Yaroslav Popovych (UKR) | Discovery Channel | + 12' 29" |

== Stage 16 ==
2007-07-25 — Orthez – Gourette–Col d'Aubisque, 218.5 km

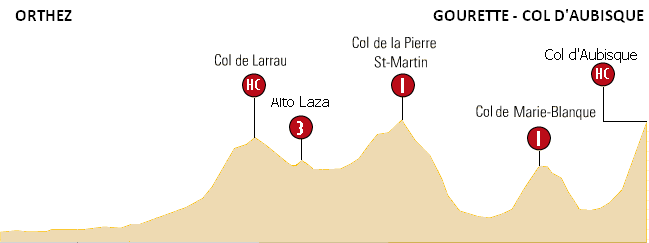
Stage 16 layout.

After a rest day, the riders took in the Tour's hardest stage, and the last chance for the climbers to make the time gains they’d need before the final time trial. The race was thought to split up somewhat on the brutal Port de Larrau (14.7 km climb at 8.1%), despite the fact that its summit came just 79 km into the stage. The race dipped into Spain for some 50 kilometres at the summit, the fourth country visited in this year's Tour. From there, there was little reprieve for the riders, hitting the Alto Laza and the Col de la Pierre St Martin (14.2 km climb at 5.2%) before descending to the start of the difficult, and very steep, first-category Col de Marie-Blanque (9.3 km climb at 7.4%). The riders then climbed the infamous Col d'Aubisque (16.7 km climb at 7%), which rewarded out-and-out climbing ability and punish the legs of all the major contenders.

The Basque separatist group ETA carried out at least 1 explosion along the route near the town of Belagua. However the riders had already gone past that point and no one was hurt.

An early attack by Stéphane Augé, one-time holder of the polka-dot jersey during this Tour, was answered by José Vicente García, Gorka Verdugo and Christophe Rinero. As Verdugo, 67th and more than 90 minutes behind Michael Rasmussen, was the best-placed man in this break the peloton was more than happy to let them go. Barloworld set to pacing the peloton after the escape, with Rabobank staying close behind them.

Mauricio Soler came free from the peloton before the first climb of the day and took full points available to him, taking the lead outright in the King of the Mountains from Rasmussen. He and Carlos Sastre, for whom it was something of a surprise that he was able to get away from the peloton easily as he was 5th in the GC at the beginning of the day, worked together to stay away as long as possible. They wound up being caught with 11 kilometers left to race by a group containing Rasmussen, Alberto Contador, Levi Leipheimer, and numerous domestiques from their teams. Rasmussen came clear of this group on the way up the Aubisque to win the stage. It was thought at the time that this all but cinched his victory in the Tour, since only flat stages and an individual time trial remained, and that even a relatively weak time trialist like Rasmussen was unlikely to lose three to five minutes.

Stage 16 result

| Rank | Rider | Team | Time |
|---|---|---|---|
| 1 | Michael Rasmussen (DEN) | Rabobank | 6h 23' 21" |
| DSQ | ~~Levi Leipheimer (USA)~~ | ~~Discovery Channel~~ | ~~+ 26"~~ |
| 2 | Alberto Contador (ESP) | Discovery Channel | + 35" |
| 3 | Cadel Evans (AUS) | Predictor–Lotto | + 43" |
| 4 | Mauricio Soler (COL) | Barloworld | + 1' 25" |
| 5 | Haimar Zubeldia (ESP) | Euskaltel–Euskadi | + 1' 52" |
| 6 | Juan José Cobo (ESP) | Saunier Duval–Prodir | + 1' 54" |
| 7 | Carlos Sastre (ESP) | Team CSC | + 2' 12" |
| 8 | Óscar Pereiro (ESP) | Caisse d'Epargne | + 2' 27" |
| 9 | Alejandro Valverde (ESP) | Caisse d'Epargne | + 2' 27" |

General classification after stage 16

| Rank | Rider | Team | Time |
|---|---|---|---|
| 1 | Michael Rasmussen (DEN) | Rabobank | 76h 15' 15" |
| 2 | Alberto Contador (ESP) | Discovery Channel | + 3' 10" |
| 3 | Cadel Evans (AUS) | Predictor–Lotto | + 5' 03" |
| 4 | ~~Levi Leipheimer (USA)~~ | ~~Discovery Channel~~ | ~~+ 5' 59"~~ |
| 5 | Carlos Sastre (ESP) | Team CSC | + 9' 12" |
| 6 | Haimar Zubeldia (ESP) | Euskaltel–Euskadi | + 9' 39" |
| 7 | Alejandro Valverde (ESP) | Caisse d'Epargne | + 13' 28" |
| 8 | Kim Kirchen (LUX) | T-Mobile Team | + 14' 46" |
| 9 | Yaroslav Popovych (UKR) | Discovery Channel | + 16' 00" |
| 10 | Mauricio Soler (COL) | Barloworld | + 16' 41" |

=== Withdrawals ===
Following stage 16, Cofidis rider, Cristian Moreni, was arrested by French police after testing positive for synthetic testosterone after stage 11. With this, the entire Cofidis team withdrew the rest of their team from the Tour. Later that evening, news broke that overall leader, Michael Rasmussen, was withdrawn from the Tour by his Rabobank team due to allegedly lying about his whereabouts during a three-week training session in Mexico in which he was unavailable for UCI doping controls. This elevated Alberto Contador to the overall lead of the race. However, as this occurred after the jersey presentations of Stage 16, there would be no maillot jaune wearer on Stage 17.

General Classification at start of Stage 17

| Rank | Rider | Team | Time |
|---|---|---|---|
| 1 | Alberto Contador (ESP) | Discovery Channel | 76h 18' 25" |
| 2 | Cadel Evans (AUS) | Predictor–Lotto | + 1' 53" |
| 3 | ~~Levi Leipheimer (USA)~~ | ~~Discovery Channel~~ | ~~+ 2' 49"~~ |
| 4 | Carlos Sastre (ESP) | Team CSC | + 6' 02" |
| 5 | Haimar Zubeldia (ESP) | Euskaltel–Euskadi | + 6' 29" |
| 6 | Alejandro Valverde (ESP) | Caisse d'Epargne | + 10' 18" |
| 7 | Kim Kirchen (LUX) | T-Mobile Team | + 11' 36" |
| 8 | Yaroslav Popovych (UKR) | Discovery Channel | + 12' 00" |
| 9 | Mauricio Soler (COL) | Barloworld | + 12' 01" |
| 10 | Mikel Astarloza (ESP) | Euskaltel–Euskadi | + 13' 42" |

== Stage 17 ==
2007-07-26 — Pau – Castelsarrasin, 188.5 km

The race left the mountains behind and turned north towards Paris. This stage had a series of small climbs, but was expected to give those sprinters who had survived the chance to earn some points.

At the 9 km mark and after a few attempted escapes, an eight-man break, including team leaders David Millar and Daniele Bennati, got away, but their lead was restricted for a long time to about two minutes by the peloton. The pace was being made by the "virtual" leader's team Discovery and Predictor–Lotto, despite the fact that no threat to the GC was posed: Jens Voigt, 34th overall and over an hour behind Alberto Contador, was the best placed man in the break. Caisse d'Epargne made the pace in earnest for a while. It was thought at the time that they wanted to try to keep their second position in the team classification, but their directeur sportif said the next day that they simply wanted to try to win the stage. The move was extremely unpopular within the peloton, with riders like Tom Boonen and Cadel Evans speaking up about it.

Denis Menchov abandoned the Tour two hours into the stage. The Caisse d'Epargne riders dropped when the break extended to four minutes over the peloton, and Discovery retook the workload. The lead of the break extended more and more; essentially Discovery was content to let them go. When the lead ballooned to eight minutes, it was calculated, given the flat course, the peloton could not make the gap up even if they wanted to. A bunched sprint for ninth place and the 17 green jersey points it afforded was still expected.

With about 18 km, Daniele Righi and Manuel Quinziato were dropped by the leading group after an attack from Bennati; not long after, Millar and Matteo Tosatto were also dropped, leaving a leading group of four – Voigt, Bennati, Markus Fothen, and Martin Elmiger. Voigt took almost all of the workload. At just under 4 km to go, Voigt attacked the group, but Bennati bridged the gap. They tried to break away from Fothen and Elmiger but could not.

Bennati, easily the strongest sprinter in the break, got to the line first. Tom Boonen, holder of the green jersey, made it to the line ahead of his rivals Robert Hunter and Erik Zabel.

Stage 17 result

| Rank | Rider | Team | Time |
|---|---|---|---|
| 1 | Daniele Bennati (ITA) | Lampre–Fondital | 4h 14' 04" |
| 2 | Markus Fothen (GER) | Gerolsteiner | s.t. |
| 3 | Martin Elmiger (SUI) | AG2R Prévoyance | s.t. |
| 4 | Jens Voigt (GER) | Team CSC | s.t. |
| 5 | David Millar (GBR) | Saunier Duval–Prodir | + 2' 41" |
| 6 | Matteo Tosatto (ITA) | Quick-Step–Innergetic | + 2' 43" |
| 7 | Manuel Quinziato (ITA) | Liquigas | + 3' 20" |
| 8 | Daniele Righi (ITA) | Lampre–Fondital | + 3' 20" |
| 9 | Tom Boonen (BEL) | Quick-Step–Innergetic | + 9' 37" |
| 10 | Sébastien Chavanel (FRA) | Française des Jeux | + 9' 37" |

General classification after stage 17

| Rank | Rider | Team | Time |
|---|---|---|---|
| 1 | Alberto Contador (ESP) | Discovery Channel | 80h 42' 08" |
| 2 | Cadel Evans (AUS) | Predictor–Lotto | + 1' 53" |
| 3 | ~~Levi Leipheimer (USA)~~ | ~~Discovery Channel~~ | ~~+ 2' 49"~~ |
| 4 | Carlos Sastre (ESP) | Team CSC | + 6' 02" |
| 5 | Haimar Zubeldia (ESP) | Euskaltel–Euskadi | + 6' 29" |
| 6 | Alejandro Valverde (ESP) | Caisse d'Epargne | + 10' 18" |
| 7 | Kim Kirchen (LUX) | T-Mobile Team | + 11' 36" |
| 8 | Yaroslav Popovych (UKR) | Discovery Channel | + 12' 50" |
| 9 | Mauricio Soler (COL) | Barloworld | + 13' 31" |
| 10 | Mikel Astarloza (ESP) | Euskaltel–Euskadi | + 13' 42" |

== Stage 18 ==
2007-07-27 — Cahors – Angoulême, 211 km

This was a long stage, with a few small climbs near the start, and was regarded as the last chance for any surprises.

Around 17 km into the stage, Michael Boogerd and Laurent Lefèvre launched the first successful attack of the day. They distanced themselves from the Discovery-led peloton that again seemed content to let the break get away, opting instead to protect Alberto Contador for the next day's individual time trial. The teams of the green jersey contenders also seemed fine with competing merely for fifth place rather than the 35 points given to the stage winner.

The two were quickly joined by a counter-attack from Axel Merckx and Sandy Casar; Boogerd and Lefevre sat up and allowed those two to join them. Casar struck a dog on the road when he and Frederick Willems were chasing Boogerd and Lefevre, and both of them went down. Casar got up quickly, but Willems was slower and wound up being absorbed by the peloton. The crash resulted in Casar tearing his gear and having to ride with a nasty wound on his exposed buttocks, since dropping off to change and have the wound treated would cost him his position. Later, the race doctor's car made it up to the leading group to tend to Casar's hip and right elbow, as well as a bee sting sustained by Boogerd.

The lead of the breakaway grew upwards of 17' 30". With Boogerd challenging the top-ten GC places of Haimar Zubeldia and Mikel Astarloza on the road, Euskaltel–Euskadi came to the front of the peloton to take the workload when the leaders were around 28 km to the line. The gap more steadily fell from that point on, successfully knocking Boogerd out of the top ten.

As the breakaway neared the finish, the riders traded attacks, but there was no real beginning to the closing sprint. A quick closing kick from Casar gave him the stage win, with a 1-second gap over his mates. Boonen's Quick Step team came forward in the final two kilometers to lead him out, with Robert Hunter and Erik Zabel right in the mix. Boonen again made it to the line ahead of his rivals, essentially clinching the green jersey win. The peloton split on the way up the slight uphill finish, giving Cadel Evans and Yaroslav Popovych, among others, three seconds back on Contador.

Stage 18 result

| Rank | Rider | Team | Time |
|---|---|---|---|
| 1 | Sandy Casar (FRA) | Française des Jeux | 5h 13' 31" |
| 2 | Axel Merckx (BEL) | T-Mobile Team | + 1" |
| 3 | Laurent Lefèvre (FRA) | AG2R Prévoyance | + 1" |
| 4 | Michael Boogerd (NED) | Rabobank | + 1" |
| 5 | Tom Boonen (BEL) | Quick-Step–Innergetic | + 8' 34" |
| 6 | Robert Hunter (RSA) | Barloworld | + 8' 34" |
| 7 | Erik Zabel (GER) | Team Milram | + 8' 34" |
| 8 | Sébastien Chavanel (FRA) | Française des Jeux | + 8' 34" |
| 9 | Bernhard Eisel (AUT) | T-Mobile Team | + 8' 34" |
| 10 | Thor Hushovd (NOR) | Crédit Agricole | + 8' 34" |

General classification after stage 18

| Rank | Rider | Team | Time |
|---|---|---|---|
| 1 | Alberto Contador (ESP) | Discovery Channel | 86h 04' 16" |
| 2 | Cadel Evans (AUS) | Predictor–Lotto | + 1' 50" |
| 3 | ~~Levi Leipheimer (USA)~~ | ~~Discovery Channel~~ | ~~+ 2' 49"~~ |
| 4 | Carlos Sastre (ESP) | Team CSC | + 6' 02" |
| 5 | Haimar Zubeldia (ESP) | Euskaltel–Euskadi | + 6' 29" |
| 6 | Alejandro Valverde (ESP) | Caisse d'Epargne | + 10' 18" |
| 7 | Kim Kirchen (LUX) | T-Mobile Team | + 11' 36" |
| 8 | Yaroslav Popovych (UKR) | Discovery Channel | + 12' 47" |
| 9 | Mauricio Soler (COL) | Barloworld | + 13' 31" |
| 10 | Mikel Astarloza (ESP) | Euskaltel–Euskadi | + 13' 42" |

== Stage 19 ==
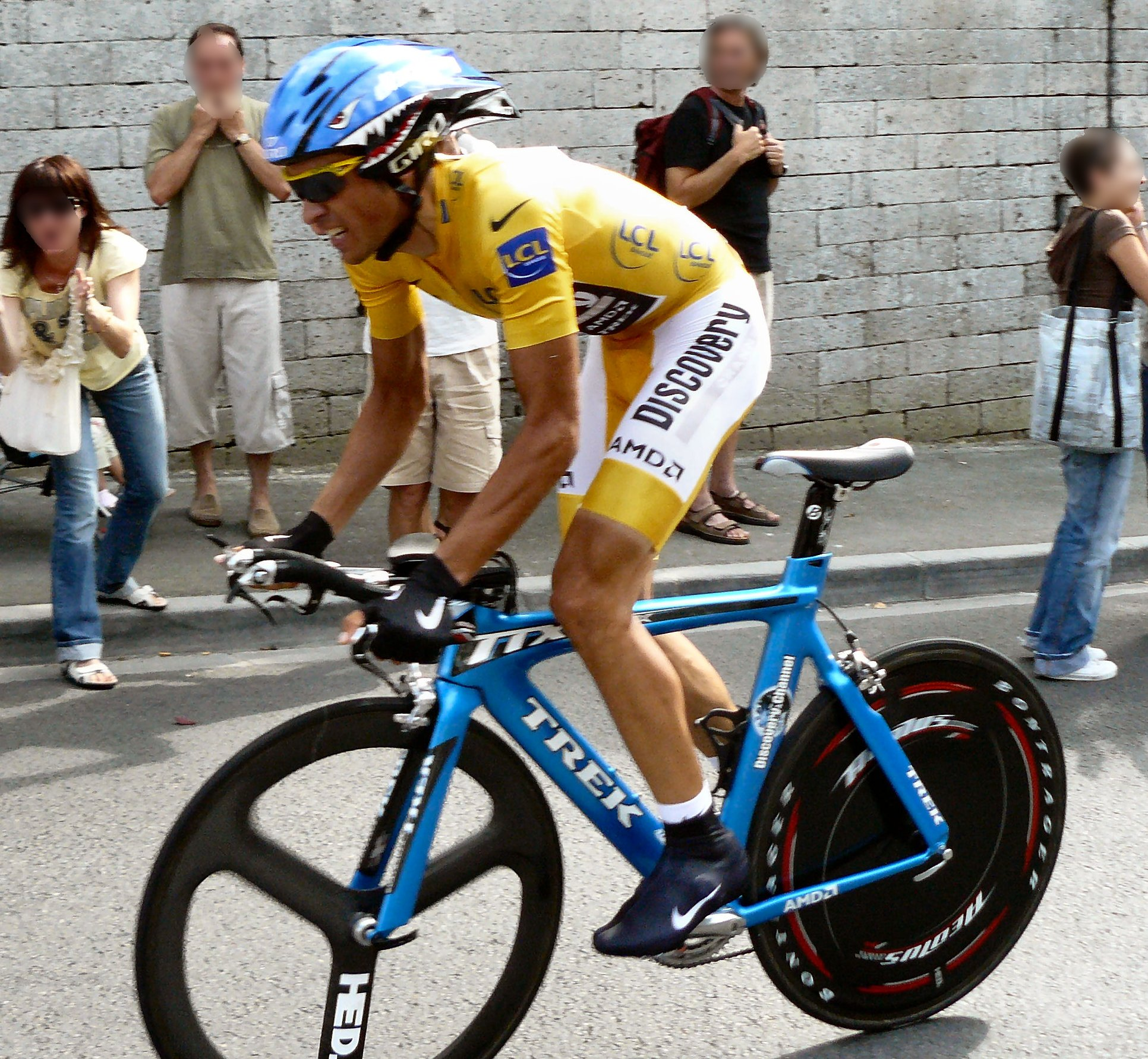
Alberto Contador on stage 19

2007-07-28 — Cognac – Angoulême, 55.5 km (ITT)

This was the second time trial stage, with long straight stretches, some beautiful sections of unbending road and some slight inclines (with one located about 600 m to the finish line). It was clear that time-trial specialists would be the center of attention. After an impressive performance during the Pyrenees crossing and the capture of the yellow jersey due to Michael Rasmussen's dismissal, Alberto Contador expressed his concerns about being beaten in the final time trial of the competition. Before the riders located above the 20th place started, Belgian Leif Hoste set a time of 1h 05' 32", making him the 1st ranked rider of the stage for a long period of time. Nonetheless, with the start of the favourites for the stage, he gradually went down through the standings, finishing in 9th position. David Millar, who was expected to be a contender for victory, experienced mechanical trouble, needing to change bikes twice within the first kilometer.

Three teams dominated the time trial: Discovery Channel, Caisse d'Epargne and Predictor–Lotto. Vladimir Karpets, current Spanish time trial champion, Iván Gutiérrez and Óscar Pereiro secured 3rd, 6th and 8th positions respectively for Caisse d'Epargne. On the other hand, Discovery Channel and Predictor–Lotto set up a fierce fight for the overall standings, primarily involving Alberto Contador, Levi Leipheimer and Cadel Evans. Of the top three GC riders, Leipheimer was the first off the start ramp followed by Evans and Contador. Leipheimer dominated the time trial, passing his three-minute man, Carlos Sastre, and shattering everyone's time at each intermediate time check before beating Karpets' time at the finish by almost two minutes. On the course, Evans needed to gain two seconds per kilometer on Contador in order to take the maillot jaune but he fell short of his goal by 23 seconds. He eventually completed the course in 1h 03' 35", 51 seconds behind Leipheimer. After Leipheimer and Evans completed the course, Contador needed to cross the finish line within 1h 05' 25" in order to keep the yellow jersey. In the end, he crossed the line in a time of 1h 05' 02", just enough to keep the yellow jersey heading into the final flat ceremonial stage to Champs-Élysées in Paris, putting him on the verge of winning his first Grand Tour.

Six years later, Leipheimer's results from this year's Tour were stripped.

Stage 19 result

| Rank | Rider | Team | Time |
|---|---|---|---|
| DSQ | ~~Levi Leipheimer (USA)~~ | ~~Discovery Channel~~ | ~~1h 02' 44"~~ |
| 2 | Cadel Evans (AUS) | Predictor–Lotto | + 51" |
| 3 | Vladimir Karpets (RUS) | Caisse d'Epargne | + 1' 56" |
| 4 | Yaroslav Popovych (UKR) | Discovery Channel | + 2' 01" |
| 5 | Alberto Contador (ESP) | Discovery Channel | + 2' 18" |
| 6 | Iván Gutiérrez (ESP) | Caisse d'Epargne | + 2' 27" |
| 7 | George Hincapie (USA) | Discovery Channel | + 2' 33" |
| 8 | Óscar Pereiro (ESP) | Caisse d'Epargne | + 2' 36" |
| 9 | Leif Hoste (BEL) | Predictor–Lotto | + 2' 48" |
| 10 | Mikel Astarloza (ESP) | Euskaltel–Euskadi | + 2' 50" |

General classification after stage 19

| Rank | Rider | Team | Time |
|---|---|---|---|
| 1 | Alberto Contador (ESP) | Discovery Channel | 87h 09' 18" |
| 2 | Cadel Evans (AUS) | Predictor–Lotto | + 23" |
| 3 | ~~Levi Leipheimer (USA)~~ | ~~Discovery Channel~~ | ~~+ 31"~~ |
| 4 | Carlos Sastre (ESP) | Team CSC | + 7' 08" |
| 5 | Haimar Zubeldia (ESP) | Euskaltel–Euskadi | + 8' 17" |
| 6 | Alejandro Valverde (ESP) | Caisse d'Epargne | + 11' 37" |
| 7 | Kim Kirchen (LUX) | T-Mobile Team | + 12' 18" |
| 8 | Yaroslav Popovych (UKR) | Discovery Channel | + 12' 30" |
| 9 | Mikel Astarloza (ESP) | Euskaltel–Euskadi | + 14' 14" |
| 10 | Óscar Pereiro (ESP) | Caisse d'Epargne | + 14' 25" |

== Stage 20 ==
2007-07-29 — Marcoussis – Paris Champs-Élysées, 146 km

The grand finale, as the race entered Paris to complete the eight laps of the traditional circuit around the Champs-Élysées.

The ride to the Champs-Élysées is traditionally free of attacks prior to the famous avenue, and the GC standings from the previous stage usually stand as the final result, as only sprinters (who are very low in the GC at this point) will usually attack. However, with only 31 seconds separating the top three men, there was much speculation that that would not be the case during this final stage.

However, the peloton proved to stay together all the way until the Champs-Élysées, except for brief escapes to nab the final intermediate sprint and two small climbs. Tradition held up; Discovery successfully led Contador onto the famous street before the sprinting began. Freddy Bichot briefly got away on the second circuit. Chris Horner of Cadel Evans' Predictor–Lotto team tried to get away soon after, but the peloton was much less willing to let him leave. When Alejandro Valverde and Axel Merckx counter-attacked Bichot to bring him back into the field, Discovery faded back.

A ten-man group formed a measurable break over the peloton during the third circuit. Barloworld came to the front of the peloton to try to bring the break back. The catch occurred on the final circuit.

Daniele Bennati won the last sprint to the line. Maillot jaune wearer, Alberto Contador, finished safely within the peloton to win the Tour overall, his first Grand Tour victory. The other classification leaders also crossed the line safely to confirm their win in their respective classifications. The traditional prize-giving commenced shortly after the race.

Stage 20 result

| Rank | Rider | Team | Time |
|---|---|---|---|
| 1 | Daniele Bennati (ITA) | Lampre–Fondital | 3h 51' 03" |
| 2 | Thor Hushovd (NOR) | Crédit Agricole | s.t. |
| 3 | Erik Zabel (GER) | Team Milram | s.t. |
| 4 | Robert Hunter (RSA) | Barloworld | s.t. |
| 5 | Tom Boonen (BEL) | Quick-Step–Innergetic | s.t. |
| 6 | Sébastien Chavanel (FRA) | Française des Jeux | s.t. |
| 7 | Fabian Cancellara (SUI) | Team CSC | s.t. |
| 8 | David Millar (GBR) | Saunier Duval–Prodir | s.t. |
| 9 | Robert Förster (GER) | Gerolsteiner | s.t. |
| 10 | Manuel Quinziato (ITA) | Liquigas | s.t. |

Final General Classification

| Rank | Rider | Team | Time |
|---|---|---|---|
| 1 | Alberto Contador (ESP) | Discovery Channel | 91h 00' 26" |
| 2 | Cadel Evans (AUS) | Predictor–Lotto | + 23" |
| DSQ | ~~Levi Leipheimer (USA)~~ | ~~Discovery Channel~~ | ~~+ 31"~~ |
| 3 | Carlos Sastre (ESP) | Team CSC | + 7' 08" |
| 4 | Haimar Zubeldia (ESP) | Euskaltel–Euskadi | + 8' 17" |
| 5 | Alejandro Valverde (ESP) | Caisse d'Epargne | + 11' 37" |
| 6 | Kim Kirchen (LUX) | T-Mobile Team | + 12' 18" |
| 7 | Yaroslav Popovych (UKR) | Discovery Channel | + 12' 25" |
| 8 | Mikel Astarloza (ESP) | Euskaltel–Euskadi | + 14' 14" |
| 9 | Óscar Pereiro (ESP) | Caisse d'Epargne | + 14' 25" |
