= 2007 Tour de France =

2007 UCI ProTour, race 17 of 26
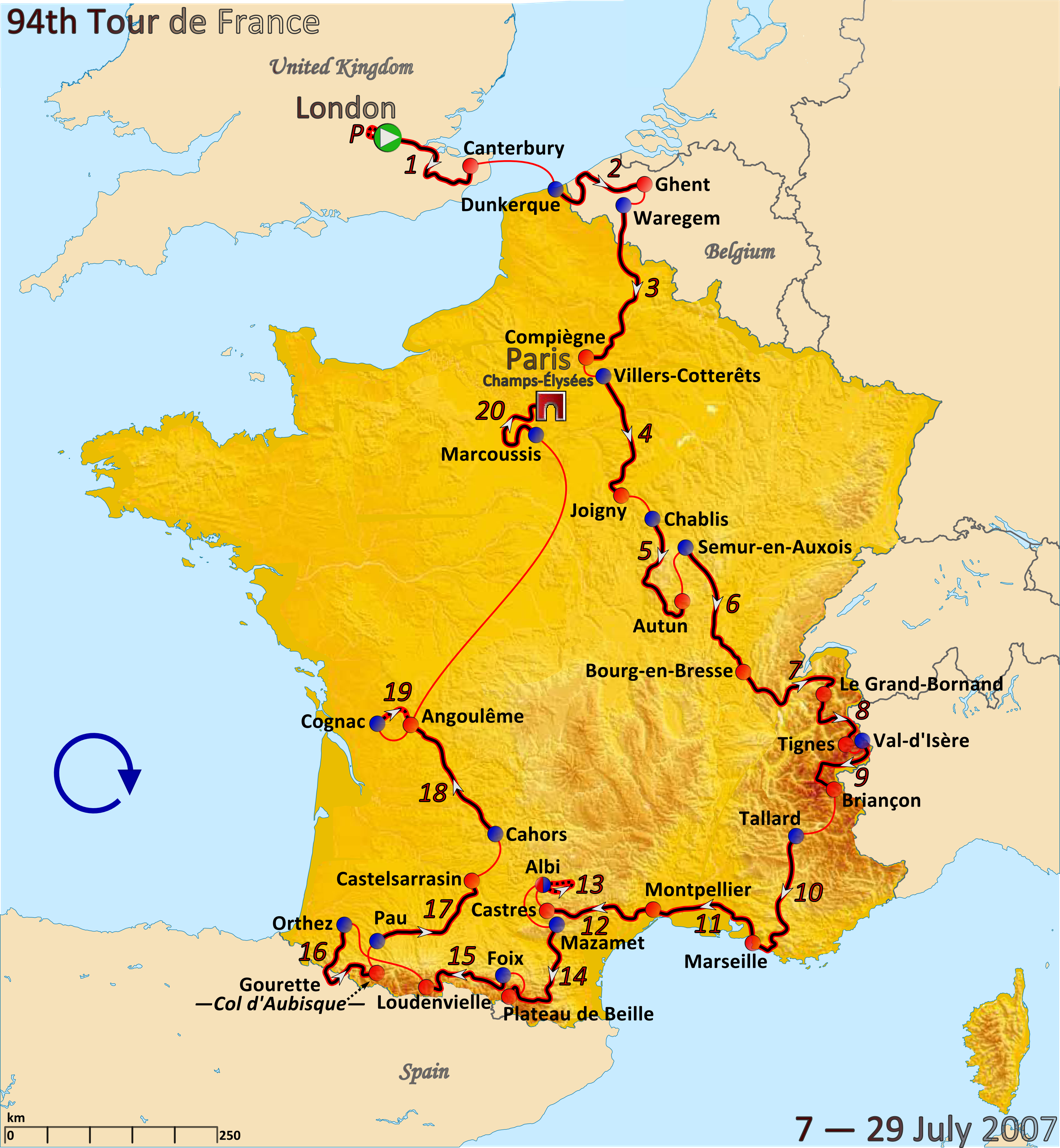
- Route of the 2007 Tour de France

Race details
- Dates: 7–29 July 2007
- Stages: 20 + Prologue
- Distance: 3,570 km (2,220 mi)
- Winning time: 91h 00' 26"

Results
Jersey awarded to the overall winner	Winner	Alberto Contador (ESP)	(Discovery Channel)
	Second	Cadel Evans (AUS)	(Predictor–Lotto)
	Third	~~Levi Leipheimer~~ none	
Jersey awarded to the points classification winner	Points	Tom Boonen (BEL)	(Quick-Step–Innergetic)
Jersey awarded to the mountains classification winner	Mountains	Mauricio Soler (COL)	(Barloworld)
Jersey awarded to the youth classification winner	Youth	Alberto Contador (ESP)	(Discovery Channel)
Jersey awarded to the combativity classification winner	Combativity	Amets Txurruka (ESP)	(Euskaltel–Euskadi)
Jersey awarded to the team classification winner	Team	Discovery Channel	

The 2007 Tour de France the 94th running of the race, took place from 7 to 29 July. The Tour began with a prologue in London, and ended with the traditional finish in Paris. Along the way, the route also passed through Belgium and Spain. It was won by Spanish rider Alberto Contador.

The Tour was marked by doping controversies, with three riders and two teams withdrawn during the race following positive doping tests, including pre-race favourite Alexander Vinokourov and his Astana team. Following Stage 16, the leader of the general classification, Michael Rasmussen, was removed from the Tour by his Rabobank team, who accused him of lying about the reasons for missing several drug tests earlier in the year.

The points classification, indicated by the green jersey, was won for the first time by Tom Boonen, who had failed to complete the previous two Tours after leading the points classification at times during each. The mountains classification, indicated by the polkadot jersey, was won by Mauricio Soler in his first Tour appearance.

The general classification, indicated by the yellow jersey, was closely contested until the final time trial on stage 19. The top three riders, Alberto Contador in the yellow jersey as the leader, Cadel Evans in second, and Levi Leipheimer in third, were separated by only 2:49, with both Evans and Leipheimer recognized as far superior time trialists to Contador. In the end, each rider held his place after the final time trial, but with considerably slimmer margins, as the Tour ended with the smallest-ever spread of only 31 seconds among the top three riders. Alberto Contador also won the young rider classification, indicated by the white jersey, as the best young (under age 25) rider.

== Teams ==
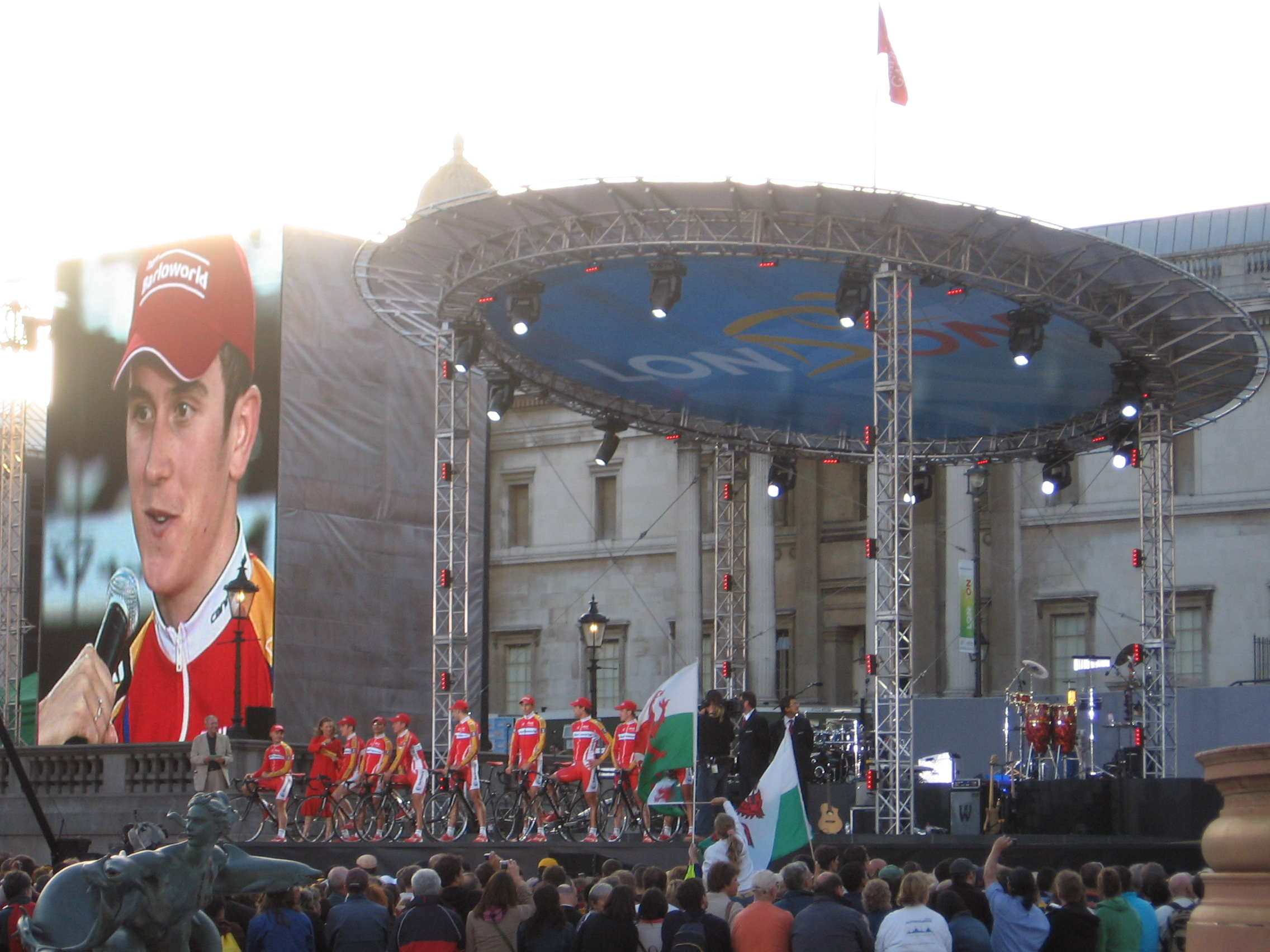
Geraint Thomas of Barloworld at the teams presentation in Trafalgar Square, London

A total of 21 teams were invited to the 2007 Tour de France. Each team sent a total of nine riders to participate in the Tour, which brought the starting total of the peloton to 189 riders. The presentation of the teams – where each team's roster are introduced in front of the media and local dignitaries – took place at Trafalgar Square in London, the day before the opening prologue held in the city.

The teams entering the race were:

UCI ProTour teams

- Astana
- AG2R Prévoyance
- Bouygues Télécom
- Caisse d'Epargne
- Cofidis
- Crédit Agricole
- Discovery Channel
- Euskaltel–Euskadi
- Française des Jeux
- Gerolsteiner
- Lampre–Fondital
- Liquigas
- Quick-Step–Innergetic
- Predictor–Lotto
- Rabobank
- Saunier Duval–Prodir
- Team CSC
- Team Milram
- T-Mobile Team

Invited teams

- Agritubel
- Barloworld

== Pre-race favourites ==
After the retirement of seven-time winner Lance Armstrong and with Ivan Basso and Floyd Landis not entering the Tour, the bookmakers' favourite to win the 2007 Tour de France was Alexander Vinokourov, who was unable to start in 2006 due to lack of team members, but did win the 2006 Vuelta a España. The main challengers were expected to be the 2006 Tour de France second-place finisher Andreas Klöden; and Alejandro Valverde, who dropped out of the 2006 Tour de France after a crash, but came second to Vinokourov in the 2006 Vuelta a España.

== Route and stages ==
The organisers of the Tour and London mayor Ken Livingstone announced on 24 January 2006 that the start of the Tour would take place in London. Livingstone noted the two stages would commemorate the victims of the 7 July 2005 London bombings, saying "Having the Grand Départ on the seventh of July will broadcast to the world that terrorism does not shake our city."

The routes for the Prologue in London and the first full stage through Kent, finishing in Canterbury, were announced on 9 February 2006 at the Queen Elizabeth II Conference Centre. This was the first time the Grand Départ was in the United Kingdom and the third time the Tour visited the United Kingdom, including Plymouth in 1974 and two stages in Kent, Sussex and Hampshire in 1994.

Tour director Christian Prudhomme unveiled the 2007 route in Paris on 26 October 2006. In total, the route covered 3,570 km (2,218 mi). The highest point of elevation in the race was 2,770 m (9,090 ft) at the summit of the Col de l'Iseran mountain pass on stage 9.

Stage characteristics and winners
Stage	Date	Course	Distance	Type	Winner
P	7 July	London (United Kingdom)	7.9 km (5 mi)	Individual time trial	Fabian Cancellara (SUI)
1	8 July	London (United Kingdom) to Canterbury (United Kingdom)	203 km (126 mi)	Plain stage	Robbie McEwen (AUS)
2	9 July	Dunkirk to Ghent (Belgium)	168.5 km (105 mi)	Plain stage	Gert Steegmans (BEL)
3	10 July	Waregem (Belgium) – Compiègne	236.5 km (147 mi)	Plain stage	Fabian Cancellara (SUI)
4	11 July	Villers-Cotterêts to Joigny	193 km (120 mi)	Plain stage	Thor Hushovd (NOR)
5	12 July	Chablis to Autun	182.5 km (113 mi)	Intermediate stage	Filippo Pozzato (ITA)
6	13 July	Semur-en-Auxois to Bourg-en-Bresse	199.5 km (124 mi)	Plain stage	Tom Boonen (BEL)
7	14 July	Bourg-en-Bresse to Le Grand-Bornand	197.5 km (123 mi)	Mountain stage	Linus Gerdemann (GER)
8	15 July	Le Grand-Bornand to Tignes	165 km (103 mi)	Mountain stage	Michael Rasmussen (DEN)
	16 July	Tignes		Rest day	
9	17 July	Val-d'Isère to Briançon	159.5 km (99 mi)	Mountain stage	Mauricio Soler (COL)
10	18 July	Tallard to Marseille	229.5 km (143 mi)	Plain stage	Cédric Vasseur (FRA)
11	19 July	Marseille to Montpellier	182.5 km (113 mi)	Plain stage	Robert Hunter (RSA)
12	20 July	Montpellier to Castres	178.5 km (111 mi)	Intermediate stage	Tom Boonen (BEL)
13	21 July	Albi	54 km (34 mi)	Individual time trial	Cadel Evans (AUS) (Note: Alexander Vinokourov tested positive for an illegal blood transfusion after stage 15. Kim Kirchen was declared the winner of stage 15 on 29 April 2008. Vinokourov's stage 13 time trial win was given to Cadel Evans.)
14	22 July	Mazamet to Plateau-de-Beille	197 km (122 mi)	Mountain stage	Alberto Contador (ESP)
15	23 July	Foix to Loudenvielle	196 km (122 mi)	Mountain stage	Kim Kirchen (LUX)
	24 July	Pau		Rest day	
16	25 July	Orthez to Gourette–Col d'Aubisque	218.5 km (136 mi)	Mountain stage	Michael Rasmussen (DEN)
17	26 July	Pau to Castelsarrasin	188.5 km (117 mi)	Intermediate stage	Daniele Bennati (ITA)
18	27 July	Cahors to Angoulême	211 km (131 mi)	Plain stage	Sandy Casar (FRA)
19	28 July	Cognac to Angoulême	55.5 km (34 mi)	Individual time trial	~~Levi Leipheimer (USA)~~
20	29 July	Marcoussis to Paris (Champs-Élysées)	146 km (91 mi)	Plain stage	Daniele Bennati (ITA)
	Total		3,570 km (2,218 mi)		

== Race overview ==
=== Doping cases ===
The first scandal arrived when it was made public on 18 July that rider Patrik Sinkewitz from the T-Mobile Team had tested positive one month before the Tour started. Sinkewitz had already withdrawn from the race having incurred an injury during the 8th stage. The scandal was big enough to prompt German TV broadcasters ZDF and ARD to drop their coverage.

The Tour was dealt a major blow when the first-place Astana team withdrew from the race on 24 July 2007, after team member and pre-race favourite Alexander Vinokourov from Kazakhstan tested positive for an illegal blood transfusion. Vinokourov's teammates Andreas Klöden and Andrey Kashechkin were in 5th and 7th place respectively at the time.

At the start of the 16th stage on 25 July, some teams made a protest against the laxness of the official attitude to doping in the race. After the stage, race officials announced that Cofidis team member Cristian Moreni of Italy had tested positive for elevated levels of testosterone, and the Cofidis team withdrew from the race.

Spanish cyclist Iban Mayo tested positive for EPO on the second rest day of the Tour, on 24 July.

French prosecutors wanted to start a legal case against Vinokourov, Mayo and Moreni, and requested the UCI to hand over the doping samples. The UCI refused to give them, and in May 2011 the investigation was stopped.

=== Other incidents ===
German cyclist Marcus Burghardt collided with a Labrador Retriever during Stage 9. The bike struck the dog on its backside, which buckled the front wheel and threw Burghardt over the handlebars onto the road.

A second incident involving a dog occurred on Stage 18. Sandy Casar and Frederik Willems were in a four-man break when Casar collided with a dog running across the road, causing both him and Willems to fall. Casar was able to rejoin the break with the help of Axel Merckx despite receiving road rash on his right buttock, while Willems returned to the peloton. Casar went on to win the stage.

After Stage 16, overall leader Michael Rasmussen was fired by his team, Rabobank, for violating team rules after he told the team that he was in Mexico with his wife in June, then being sighted training in Italy by Italian journalist Davide Cassani. Rasmussen disputed this claim, maintaining that he was in Mexico. Thus, at the start of stage 17 there was no holder of the yellow jersey. Afterward the lead and the jersey were transferred to Discovery Channel's Alberto Contador. Rasmussen later in 2013 confessed to doping from 1998 to 2010, including at the 2007 Tour de France.

== Classification leadership and minor prizes ==
There were four main classifications contested in the 2007 Tour de France, with the most important being the general classification. The general classification was calculated by adding each cyclist's finishing times on each stage. The cyclist with the least accumulated time was the race leader, identified by the yellow jersey; the winner of this classification was considered the winner of the Tour. There were no time bonuses given at the end of stages for this edition of the Tour.

Additionally, there was a points classification, which awards a green jersey. In the points classification, cyclists get points for finishing among the best in a stage finish, or in intermediate sprints. The cyclist with the most points led the classification, and is identified with a green jersey.

There was also a mountains classification. The organization categorised some climbs as either hors catégorie, first, second, third, or fourth-category; points for this classification were won by the first cyclists that reach the top of these climbs, with more points available for the higher-categorised climbs. The cyclist with the most points led the classification, and wore a white jersey with red polka dots.

The fourth individual classification was the young rider classification, marked by the white jersey. This classification was calculated the same way as the general classification, but the classification was restricted to riders who were born on or after 1 January 1987.

For the team classification, the times of the best three cyclists per team on each stage were added; the leading team is the team with the lowest total time. The riders in the team that lead this classification were identified with yellow numbers.

The super-combativity award was given to Amets Txurruka. The Souvenir Henri Desgrange given in honour of Tour founder Henri Desgrange to the first rider to pass the summit of the Col du Galibier on stage 9. This prize was won by Mauricio Soler.

Classification leadership by stage
Stage	Winner	General classification	Points classification	Mountains classification	Young rider classification	Team classification	Combativity award
P	Fabian Cancellara	Fabian Cancellara	Fabian Cancellara	no award	Vladimir Gusev	Astana	no award
1	Robbie McEwen	Fabian Cancellara	Robbie McEwen	David Millar	Vladimir Gusev	Astana	Stéphane Augé
2	Gert Steegmans	Fabian Cancellara	Tom Boonen	David Millar	Vladimir Gusev	Astana	Marcel Sieberg
3	Fabian Cancellara	Fabian Cancellara	Tom Boonen	Stéphane Augé	Vladimir Gusev	Astana	Mathieu Ladagnous
4	Thor Hushovd	Fabian Cancellara	Tom Boonen	Stéphane Augé	Vladimir Gusev	Astana	Matthieu Sprick
5	Filippo Pozzato	Fabian Cancellara	Erik Zabel	Sylvain Chavanel	Vladimir Gusev	Team CSC	Sylvain Chavanel
6	Tom Boonen	Fabian Cancellara	Tom Boonen	Sylvain Chavanel	Vladimir Gusev	Team CSC	Bradley Wiggins
7	Linus Gerdemann	Linus Gerdemann	Tom Boonen	Sylvain Chavanel	Linus Gerdemann	T-Mobile Team	Linus Gerdemann
8	Michael Rasmussen	Michael Rasmussen	Tom Boonen	Michael Rasmussen	Linus Gerdemann	Rabobank	Michael Rasmussen
9	Mauricio Soler	Michael Rasmussen	Tom Boonen	Michael Rasmussen	Alberto Contador	Caisse d'Epargne	Yaroslav Popovych
10	Cédric Vasseur	Michael Rasmussen	Tom Boonen	Michael Rasmussen	Alberto Contador	Team CSC	Patrice Halgand
11	Robert Hunter	Michael Rasmussen	Tom Boonen	Michael Rasmussen	Alberto Contador	Team CSC	Benoît Vaugrenard
12	Tom Boonen	Michael Rasmussen	Tom Boonen	Michael Rasmussen	Alberto Contador	Team CSC	Amets Txurruka
13	Cadel Evans	Michael Rasmussen	Tom Boonen	Michael Rasmussen	Alberto Contador	Astana	no award
14	Alberto Contador	Michael Rasmussen	Tom Boonen	Michael Rasmussen	Alberto Contador	Discovery Channel	Antonio Colom
15	Kim Kirchen	Michael Rasmussen	Tom Boonen	Michael Rasmussen	Alberto Contador	Astana	Alexander Vinokourov
16	Michael Rasmussen	Michael Rasmussen	Tom Boonen	Mauricio Soler	Alberto Contador	Discovery Channel	Mauricio Soler
17	Daniele Bennati	Alberto Contador	Tom Boonen	Mauricio Soler	Alberto Contador	Discovery Channel	Jens Voigt
18	Sandy Casar	Alberto Contador	Tom Boonen	Mauricio Soler	Alberto Contador	Discovery Channel	Sandy Casar
19	~~Levi Leipheimer~~	Alberto Contador	Tom Boonen	Mauricio Soler	Alberto Contador	Discovery Channel	no award
20	Daniele Bennati	Alberto Contador	Tom Boonen	Mauricio Soler	Alberto Contador	Discovery Channel	Freddy Bichot
Final		Alberto Contador	Tom Boonen	Mauricio Soler	Alberto Contador	Discovery Channel	Amets Txurruka

- In stage 1, Andreas Klöden, who was second in the points classification, wore the green jersey, because Fabian Cancellara (in first place) wore the yellow jersey as leader of the general classification during that stage.
- In stage 8, Mauricio Soler, who was second in the young riders classification, wore the white jersey, because Linus Gerdemann (in first place) wore the yellow jersey as leader of the general classification during that stage.
- In stage 9, Sylvain Chavanel, who was second in the king of the mountains classification, wore the polka-dot jersey, because Michael Rasmussen (in first place) wore the yellow jersey as leader of the general classification during that stage.
- In stages 10, 11, 12, 13, 14, 15, and 16, Mauricio Soler, who was second in the king of the mountains classification, wore the polka-dot jersey, because Michael Rasmussen (in first place) wore the yellow jersey as leader of the general classification during that stage.
- Shortly after Michael Rasmussen won stage 16, his Rabobank team removed him from the Tour for violation of team rules; therefore in stage 17, no one wore the yellow jersey.
- In stage 18, 19, and 20, Amets Txurruka, who was third in the young riders classification, wore the white jersey, because Alberto Contador (in first place) wore the yellow jersey as leader of the general classification during that stage and Mauricio Soler (in second place) wore the polka-dot jersey for leading the king of the mountains classification.

== Final standings ==
Legend
A yellow jersey.	Denotes the winner of the general classification	A green jersey.	Denotes the winner of the points classification
A white jersey with red polka dots.	Denotes the winner of the mountains classification	A white jersey.	Denotes the winner of the young rider classification
A white jersey with a yellow number bib.	Denotes the winner of the team classification	A white jersey with a red number bib.	Denotes the winner of the super-combativity award

=== General classification ===
Final general classification (1–10)
Rank	Rider	Team	Time
1	Alberto Contador (ESP)	Discovery Channel	91h 00' 26"
2	Cadel Evans (AUS)	Predictor–Lotto	+ 23"
DSQ	~~Levi Leipheimer~~ (USA)	~~Discovery Channel~~	~~+ 31"~~
4	Carlos Sastre (ESP)	Team CSC	+ 7' 08"
5	Haimar Zubeldia (ESP)	Euskaltel–Euskadi	+ 8' 17"
6	Alejandro Valverde (ESP)	Caisse d'Epargne	+ 11' 37"
7	Kim Kirchen (LUX)	T-Mobile Team	+ 12' 18"
8	Yaroslav Popovych (UKR)	Discovery Channel	+ 12' 25"
9	Mikel Astarloza (ESP)	Euskaltel–Euskadi	+ 14' 14"
10	Óscar Pereiro (ESP)	Caisse d'Epargne	+ 14' 25"

Final general classification (11–141)
Rank	Rider	Team	Time
11	Mauricio Soler (COL)	Barloworld	+ 16' 51"
DSQ	~~Michael Boogerd (NED)~~	~~Rabobank~~	~~+ 21' 15"~~
13	David Arroyo (ESP)	Caisse d'Epargne	+ 21' 49"
14	Vladimir Karpets (RUS)	Caisse d'Epargne	+ 24' 15"
15	Chris Horner (USA)	Predictor–Lotto	+ 25' 19"
16	Iban Mayo (ESP)	Saunier Duval–Prodir	+ 27' 09"
17	Fränk Schleck (LUX)	Team CSC	+ 31' 48"
18	Manuel Beltrán (ESP)	Liquigas	+ 34' 14"
19	Tadej Valjavec (SLO)	Lampre–Fondital	+ 37' 08"
20	Juan José Cobo (ESP)	Saunier Duval–Prodir	+ 37' 14"
21	Juan Manuel Gárate (ESP)	Quick-Step–Innergetic	+ 38' 16"
22	Iván Gutiérrez (ESP)	Caisse d'Epargne	+ 45' 42"
23	Amets Txurruka (ESP)	Euskaltel–Euskadi	+ 49' 34"
24	George Hincapie (USA)	Discovery Channel	+ 54' 50"
25	Christian Vande Velde (USA)	Team CSC	+ 55' 50"
26	Dmitry Fofonov (KAZ)	Crédit Agricole	+ 56' 23"
27	Stéphane Goubert (FRA)	AG2R Prévoyance	+ 1h 06' 30"
28	Jens Voigt (GER)	Team CSC	+ 1h 08' 22"
29	Patxi Vila (ESP)	Lampre–Fondital	+ 1h 09' 37"
30	Patrice Halgand (FRA)	Crédit Agricole	+ 1h 12' 45"
31	Bernhard Kohl (AUT)	Gerolsteiner	+ 1h 13' 27"
32	Kanstantsin Sivtsov (BLR)	Barloworld	+ 1h 15' 16"
33	Alexander Bocharov (RUS)	Crédit Agricole	+ 1h 22' 25"
34	Markus Fothen (GER)	Gerolsteiner	+ 1h 30' 12"
35	Thomas Dekker (NED)	Rabobank	+ 1h 30' 34"
36	Linus Gerdemann (GER)	T-Mobile Team	+ 1h 30' 47"
37	Christophe Moreau (FRA)	AG2R Prévoyance	+ 1h 33' 06"
38	Vladimir Gusev (RUS)	Discovery Channel	+ 1h 33' 50"
39	Moisés Dueñas (ESP)	Agritubel	+ 1h 36' 33"
40	Bram Tankink (NED)	Quick-Step–Innergetic	+ 1h 36' 44"
41	Marzio Bruseghin (ITA)	Lampre–Fondital	+ 1h 36' 44"
42	Carlos Barredo (ESP)	Quick-Step–Innergetic	+ 1h 36' 46"
43	Iñigo Landaluze (ESP)	Euskaltel–Euskadi	+ 1h 36' 50"
44	Ludovic Turpin (FRA)	AG2R Prévoyance	+ 1h 44' 54"
45	Charly Wegelius (GBR)	Liquigas	+ 1h 46' 25"
46	Xavier Florencio (ESP)	Bouygues Télécom	+ 1h 52' 19"
47	Christian Knees (GER)	Team Milram	+ 1h 53' 23"
48	Gorka Verdugo (ESP)	Euskaltel–Euskadi	+ 1h 53' 32"
49	David de la Fuente (ESP)	Saunier Duval–Prodir	+ 1h 54' 50"
50	Rubén Pérez (ESP)	Euskaltel–Euskadi	+ 1h 56' 15"
51	Íñigo Cuesta (ESP)	Team CSC	+ 1h 58' 45"
52	José Luis Arrieta (ESP)	AG2R Prévoyance	+ 2h 00' 07"
53	Iker Camaño (ESP)	Saunier Duval–Prodir	+ 2h 05' 17"
54	John Gadret (FRA)	AG2R Prévoyance	+ 2h 06' 50"
55	Cédric Vasseur (FRA)	Quick-Step–Innergetic	+ 2h 08' 14"
56	Dario Cioni (ITA)	Predictor–Lotto	+ 2h 10' 42"
57	Nicolas Portal (FRA)	Caisse d'Epargne	+ 2h 15' 14"
58	Laurent Lefèvre (FRA)	Bouygues Télécom	+ 2h 15' 17"
59	Michael Albasini (SUI)	Liquigas	+ 2h 18' 35"
60	Fabian Wegmann (GER)	Gerolsteiner	+ 2h 19' 36"
61	Egoi Martínez (ESP)	Discovery Channel	+ 2h 20' 16"
62	Axel Merckx (BEL)	T-Mobile Team	+ 2h 21' 00"
63	Johan Vansummeren (BEL)	Predictor–Lotto	+ 2h 21' 57"
64	Thomas Löfkvist (SWE)	Française des Jeux	+ 2h 22' 50"
65	Sérgio Paulinho (POR)	Discovery Channel	+ 2h 23' 31"
66	Thomas Voeckler (FRA)	Bouygues Télécom	+ 2h 24' 34"
67	Kurt Asle Arvesen (NOR)	Team CSC	+ 2h 24' 36"
68	Jérôme Pineau (FRA)	Bouygues Télécom	+ 2h 24' 59"
69	David Millar (GBR)	Saunier Duval–Prodir	+ 2h 32' 07"
70	Mario Aerts (BEL)	Predictor–Lotto	+ 2h 32' 58"
71	Sandy Casar (FRA)	Française des Jeux	+ 2h 33' 46"
72	Francisco Pérez Sanchez (ESP)	Caisse d'Epargne	+ 2h 37' 25"
73	Frederik Willems (BEL)	Liquigas	+ 2h 37' 30"
74	Martin Elmiger (SUI)	AG2R Prévoyance	+ 2h 37' 41"
75	Daniele Bennati (ITA)	Lampre–Fondital	+ 2h 38' 30"
76	Kjell Carlström (FIN)	Liquigas	+ 2h 39' 34"
77	Christophe Rinero (FRA)	Saunier Duval–Prodir	+ 2h 40' 59"
78	Andriy Hrivko (UKR)	Team Milram	+ 2h 41' 41"
79	Erik Zabel (GER)	Team Milram	+ 2h 42' 28"
80	Juan Miguel Mercado (ESP)	Agritubel	+ 2h 44' 27"
81	Ronny Scholz (GER)	Gerolsteiner	+ 2h 44' 39"
82	Jorge Azanza (ESP)	Euskaltel–Euskadi	+ 2h 50' 30"
83	Benoît Vaugrenard (FRA)	Française des Jeux	+ 2h 50' 54"
84	Pierrick Fédrigo (FRA)	Bouygues Télécom	+ 2h 53' 42"
85	Juan Antonio Flecha (ESP)	Rabobank	+ 2h 55' 58"
86	Grischa Niermann (GER)	Rabobank	+ 2h 56' 09"
87	Stefan Schumacher (GER)	Gerolsteiner	+ 2h 56' 30"
88	Alessandro Ballan (ITA)	Lampre–Fondital	+ 2h 57' 05"
89	Aleksandr Kuschynski (BLR)	Liquigas	+ 2h 58' 46"
90	Iñaki Isasi (ESP)	Euskaltel–Euskadi	+ 2h 59' 37"
91	José Vicente García (ESP)	Caisse d'Epargne	+ 3h 00' 38"
92	Nicolas Vogondy (FRA)	Agritubel	+ 3h 00' 50"
93	Johann Tschopp (SUI)	Bouygues Télécom	+ 3h 07' 19"
94	Simon Gerrans (AUS)	AG2R Prévoyance	+ 3h 09' 19"
95	Paolo Bossoni (ITA)	Lampre–Fondital	+ 3h 09' 56"
96	Daniele Righi (ITA)	Lampre–Fondital	+ 3h 10' 35"
97	Lilian Jégou (FRA)	Française des Jeux	+ 3h 14' 11"
98	Anthony Geslin (FRA)	Bouygues Télécom	+ 3h 14' 15"
99	Alexander Efimkin (RUS)	Barloworld	+ 3h 14' 19"
100	Fabian Cancellara (SUI)	Team CSC	+ 3h 15' 48"
101	Murilo Fischer (BRA)	Liquigas	+ 3h 16' 08"
102	Freddy Bichot (FRA)	Agritubel	+ 3h 16' 58"
103	David Cañada (ESP)	Saunier Duval–Prodir	+ 3h 17' 19"
104	Sébastien Rosseler (BEL)	Quick-Step–Innergetic	+ 3h 18' 25"
105	Bert Grabsch (GER)	T-Mobile Team	+ 3h 19' 58"
106	Félix Cárdenas (COL)	Barloworld	+ 3h 19' 58"
107	Julian Dean (NZL)	Crédit Agricole	+ 3h 21' 57"
108	Matteo Tosatto (ITA)	Quick-Step–Innergetic	+ 3h 22' 14"
109	William Bonnet (FRA)	Crédit Agricole	+ 3h 22' 59"
110	Leif Hoste (BEL)	Predictor–Lotto	+ 3h 23' 02"
111	Giampaolo Cheula (ITA)	Barloworld	+ 3h 23' 11"
112	Mathieu Ladagnous (FRA)	Française des Jeux	+ 3h 23' 17"
113	Manuel Quinziato (ITA)	Liquigas	+ 3h 23' 42"
114	Nicolas Jalabert (FRA)	Agritubel	+ 3h 24' 02"
115	Benjamín Noval (ESP)	Discovery Channel	+ 3h 24' 13"
116	Ralf Grabsch (GER)	Team Milram	+ 3h 24' 35"
117	Mickaël Delage (FRA)	Française des Jeux	+ 3h 24' 46"
118	Robert Hunter (RSA)	Barloworld	+ 3h 26' 12"
119	Tom Boonen (BEL)	Quick-Step–Innergetic	+ 3h 26' 19"
120	Marcel Sieberg (GER)	Team Milram	+ 3h 26' 48"
121	Bernhard Eisel (AUT)	T-Mobile Team	+ 3h 26' 57"
122	Alessandro Cortinovis (ITA)	Team Milram	+ 3h 27' 04"
123	Steven de Jongh (NED)	Quick-Step–Innergetic	+ 3h 27' 45"
124	Paolo Longo Borghini (ITA)	Barloworld	+ 3h 27' 48"
125	Benoît Salmon (FRA)	Agritubel	+ 3h 28' 59"
126	Claudio Corioni (ITA)	Lampre–Fondital	+ 3h 29' 26"
127	Marcus Burghardt (GER)	T-Mobile Team	+ 3h 29' 37"
128	Pieter Weening (NED)	Rabobank	+ 3h 31' 49"
129	Heinrich Haussler (GER)	Gerolsteiner	+ 3h 32' 30"
130	Sébastien Chavanel (FRA)	Française des Jeux	+ 3h 35' 25"
131	Enrico Poitschke (GER)	Team Milram	+ 3h 35' 28"
132	Sébastien Hinault (FRA)	Crédit Agricole	+ 3h 35' 37"
133	Peter Wrolich (AUT)	Gerolsteiner	+ 3h 36' 05"
134	Bram de Groot (NED)	Rabobank	+ 3h 37' 46"
135	Robert Förster (GER)	Gerolsteiner	+ 3h 40' 10"
136	Anthony Charteau (FRA)	Crédit Agricole	+ 3h 40' 44"
137	Sven Krauß (GER)	Gerolsteiner	+ 3h 40' 51"
138	Gert Steegmans (BEL)	Quick-Step–Innergetic	+ 3h 41' 38"
139	Thor Hushovd (NOR)	Crédit Agricole	+ 3h 41' 57"
140	Geraint Thomas (GBR)	Barloworld	+ 3h 46' 51"
141	Wim Vansevenant (BEL)	Predictor–Lotto	+ 3h 52' 54"

=== Points classification ===
Final points classification (1–10)
Rank	Rider	Team	Points
1	Tom Boonen (BEL)	Quick-Step–Innergetic	256
2	Robert Hunter (RSA)	Barloworld	234
3	Erik Zabel (GER)	Team Milram	232
4	Thor Hushovd (NOR)	Crédit Agricole	186
5	Sébastien Chavanel (FRA)	Française des Jeux	181
6	Daniele Bennati (ITA)	Lampre–Fondital	160
7	Robert Förster (GER)	Gerolsteiner	140
8	Fabian Cancellara (SUI)	Team CSC	112
9	Cadel Evans (AUS)	Predictor–Lotto	109
10	Alberto Contador (ESP)	Discovery Channel	88

=== Mountains classification ===
Final mountains classification (1–10)
Rank	Rider	Team	Points
1	Mauricio Soler (COL)	Barloworld	206
2	Alberto Contador (ESP)	Discovery Channel	128
3	Yaroslav Popovych (UKR)	Discovery Channel	105
4	Cadel Evans (AUS)	Predictor–Lotto	92
5	Laurent Lefèvre (FRA)	Bouygues Télécom	85
6	Juan Manuel Gárate (ESP)	Quick-Step–Innergetic	77
7	Carlos Sastre (ESP)	Team CSC	74
8	Juan José Cobo (ESP)	Saunier Duval–Prodir	68
DSQ	~~Levi Leipheimer (USA)~~	~~Discovery Channel~~	~~64~~
10	Haimar Zubeldia (ESP)	Euskaltel–Euskadi	64

=== Young rider classification ===
Final young rider classification (1–10)
Rank	Rider	Team	Time
1	Alberto Contador (ESP)	Discovery Channel	91h 00' 26"
2	Mauricio Soler (COL)	Barloworld	+ 16' 51"
3	Amets Txurruka (ESP)	Euskaltel–Euskadi	+ 49' 34"
4	Bernhard Kohl (AUT)	Gerolsteiner	+ 1h 13' 27"
5	Kanstantsin Sivtsov (BLR)	Barloworld	+ 1h 15' 16"
6	Thomas Dekker (NED)	Rabobank	+ 1h 30' 34"
7	Linus Gerdemann (GER)	T-Mobile Team	+ 1h 30' 47"
8	Vladimir Gusev (RUS)	Discovery Channel	+ 1h 33' 50"
9	Thomas Lövkvist (SWE)	Française des Jeux	+ 2h 22' 50"
10	Andriy Hrivko (UKR)	Team Milram	+ 2h 41' 41"

=== Team classification ===
Final team classification (1–10)
Rank	Team	Time
1	Discovery Channel	273h 12' 52"
2	Caisse d'Epargne	+ 19' 36"
3	Team CSC	+ 22' 10"
4	Rabobank	+ 36' 24"
5	Euskaltel–Euskadi	+ 46' 46"
6	Saunier Duval–Prodir	+ 1h 44' 33"
7	Predictor–Lotto	+ 1h 50' 21"
8	Lampre–Fondital	+ 2h 19' 41"
9	Crédit Agricole	+ 2h 25' 44"
10	AG2R Prévoyance	+ 2h 26' 08"

== UCI ProTour rankings ==
Riders in the UCI ProTour (therefore not members of the wildcard entries Barloworld or Agritubel) are awarded UCI ProTour points for their performance in the Tour de France. The winner of a stage receives 10 points, second receives 5 points and third 3 points. UCI ProTour points are also awarded for high places in the final classification, with 100 points for the overall winner.

UCI ProTour rankings (1–10)
Rank	Rider	Team	Points
1	Alberto Contador (ESP)	Discovery Channel	113
2	Cadel Evans (AUS)	Predictor–Lotto	88
DSQ	~~Levi Leipheimer (USA)~~	~~Discovery Channel~~	~~75~~
4	Carlos Sastre (ESP)	Team CSC	55
5	Alejandro Valverde (ESP)	Caisse d'Epargne	53
5	Haimar Zubeldia (ESP)	Euskaltel–Euskadi	53
7	Kim Kirchen (LUX)	T-Mobile Team	45
8	Yaroslav Popovych (UKR)	Discovery Channel	35
9	Mikel Astarloza (ESP)	Euskaltel–Euskadi	30
10	Tom Boonen (BEL)	Quick-Step–Innergetic	28

UCI ProTour rankings (11–44)
Rank	Rider	Team	Points
11	Fabian Cancellara (SUI)	Team CSC	25
11	Óscar Pereiro (ESP)	Caisse d'Epargne	25
11	Michael Rasmussen (DEN)	Rabobank	25
14	Daniele Bennati (ITA)	Lampre–Fondital	23
15	Thor Hushovd (NOR)	Crédit Agricole	20
15	Alexander Vinokourov (KAZ)	Astana	20
17	Erik Zabel (GER)	Team Milram	16
18	Sandy Casar (FRA)	Française des Jeux	15
18	Michael Boogerd (NED)	Rabobank	15
20	Óscar Freire (ESP)	Rabobank	13
20	Vladimir Karpets (RUS)	Caisse d'Epargne	13
20	Filippo Pozzato (ITA)	Liquigas	13
23	David Arroyo (ESP)	Caisse d'Epargne	12
24	Iban Mayo (ESP)	Saunier Duval–Prodir	11
25	Linus Gerdemann (GER)	T-Mobile Team	10
25	Robbie McEwen (AUS)	Predictor–Lotto	10
25	Gert Steegmans (BEL)	Quick-Step–Innergetic	10
25	Cedric Vasseur (FRA)	Quick-Step–Innergetic	10
29	Chris Horner (USA)	Predictor–Lotto	8
29	Andreas Klöden (GER)	Astana	8
31	Markus Fothen (GER)	Gerolsteiner	5
31	Iñigo Landaluze (ESP)	Euskaltel–Euskadi	5
31	Axel Merckx (BEL)	T-Mobile Team	5
31	Fränk Schleck (LUX)	Team CSC	5
35	Manuel Beltrán (ESP)	Liquigas	4
36	Michael Albasini (SUI)	Liquigas	3
36	Martin Elmiger (SUI)	AG2R Prévoyance	3
36	Murilo Fischer (BRA)	Liquigas	3
36	David de la Fuente (ESP)	Saunier Duval–Prodir	3
36	George Hincapie (USA)	Discovery Channel	3
36	Laurent Lefèvre (FRA)	AG2R Prévoyance	3
36	Danilo Napolitano (ITA)	Lampre–Fondital	3
36	Tadej Valjavec (SLO)	Lampre–Fondital	3
44	Juan José Cobo (ESP)	Saunier Duval–Prodir	2

== See also ==
- List of doping cases in cycling

== Bibliography ==
- Augendre, Jacques (2016). "Guide historique" [Historical guide] (PDF). Tour de France (in French). Paris: Amaury Sport Organisation. Archived (PDF) from the original on 17 August 2016.
- Nauright, John; Parrish, Charles (2012). Sports Around the World: History, Culture, and Practice. Vol. 2. Santa Barbara, California: ABC-CLIO. ISBN 978-1-59884-300-2.
