= Michael Rasmussen (cyclist) =

Danish cyclist

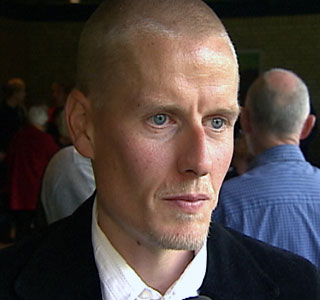

Personal information
- Nicknames: Kyllingen fra Tølløse (The Chicken from Tølløse)
- Born: 1 June 1974 (age 52) Tølløse, Denmark
- Height: 1.75 m (5 ft 9 in)
- Weight: 60 kg (132 lb; 9 st 6 lb)

Cycling career
- Sport: Cycling
- Current team: Retired
- Disciplines: Road, mountain biking
- Role: Rider
- Rider type: Climbing specialist

Professional teams
- 1993–1994: Wheeler (MTB)
- 1995–1996: Scott International (MTB)
- 1997–1998: Trek-Volkswagen (MTB)
- 1999: Gary Fisher (MTB)
- 2000–2001: Haro-Lee (MTB)
- 2001: Dungarees (MTB)
- 2001: CSC–Tiscali (stagiaire)
- 2002: CSC–Tiscali
- 2003–2007: Rabobank
- 2009: Tecos Guadalajara
- 2010: Miche
- 2011–2013: Christina Watches–Onfone

Major wins
- Grand Tours Tour de France Mountains classification (2005, 2006) 4 individual stages (2005, 2006, 2007) Vuelta a España 1 individual stage (2003)
Medal record
Men's mountain bike racing
Representing Denmark
World Championships
Gold medal – first place	1999 Åre	Cross-country

Michael Rasmussen (born 1 June 1974) is a Danish retired professional cyclist who competed in road racing and mountain biking. His most notable victories include four stages of the Tour de France (shared Danish record), and one stage of the Vuelta a España. He also won the best climber classification in the 2005 and 2006 Tour de France.

Specializing in climbing, Rasmussen showed a propensity for attempting spectacular wins in mountain stages in which he broke away from the peloton early and rode alone for most of the stage. Michael Rasmussen was known for his care for detail when considering weight. With a low weight (60 kg) he was usually one of the lightest riders in his class.

In the 2007 Tour de France, Rasmussen while wearing the yellow jersey and well on his way to winning the Tour, had his contract terminated by his team and was removed from the Tour. He served a two-year ban from July 2007 to July 2009 for lying about his whereabouts. At a press conference on 31 January 2013, Rasmussen admitted that he had used performance-enhancing drugs and methods, including EPO, growth hormones, insulin, testosterone, DHEA, IGF-1, Oxyglobin, cortisone and blood doping, for most of his professional career.

== Biography ==
Rasmussen began his career as a mountain biker, and he won the Mountain Bike World Championships in 1999 before becoming a stagiaire with the professional cycling team CSC–Tiscali in 2001. There he secured a one-year contract for 2002, and following a string of good results in August and September, including his first professional win, he switched from CSC-Tiscali to Rabobank in 2003. After being sacked by Rabobank in the 2007 Tour de France, Rasmussen got a contract offer from Acqua & Sapone–Caffè Mokambo. The team's manager then decided that the move would be too expensive and thus Rasmussen was without contract.

== Tour de France history ==
=== 2004 ===
His first Tour de France was in 2004, in which he failed to get any stage wins but was third in the mountains classification, which was won by Richard Virenque. Rasmussen then agreed with his team that he could train alone and focus on the Tour de France for 2005.

=== 2005 ===
At the 2005 Tour de France his training paid off when he took the polka dot jersey as leader of the mountains classification on stage eight. The next day he won stage nine after riding alone for three-quarters of the course; he had broken away after 3 km and stayed clear to the finish 168 km later. He led over the first category 1 climb, the Ballon d'Alsace. In the penultimate stage (Stage 20), an individual time trial, he lost his third place after a fall at 4 km, then two bike changes, two wheel changes and a crash into a ditch. After his first fall, he lost confidence and his ability to descend at speed, according to Rabobank's sports director Erik Breukink. Rasmussen finished 77th that day and dropped from 3rd to 7th on the GC. However he needed only to finish the final stage the next day to assure his status as King of the Mountains.

Rasmussen rode much of the next day alone, saying he needed to clear his mind after the day before. After becoming king of the mountains, Rasmussen wore not only the polka dot jersey, but polka dot helmet, shorts, gloves, and socks. For the final stage, he rode a polka dot bike made by Ernesto Colnago, founder of the Colnago company.

=== 2006 ===
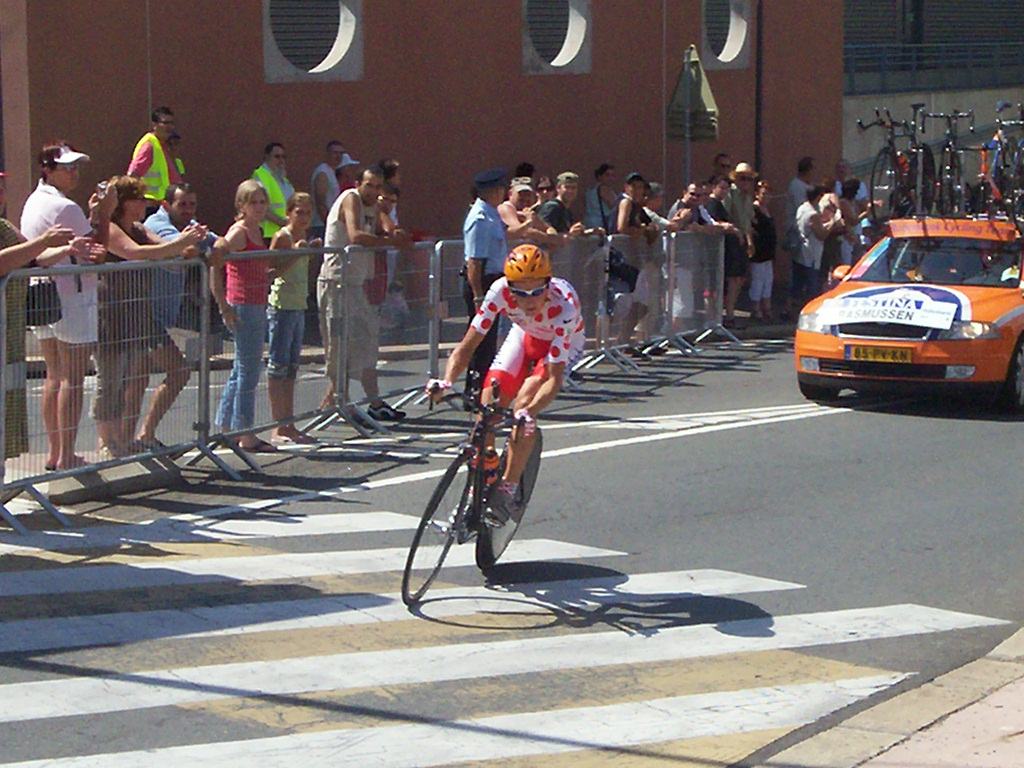
Michael Rasmussen in the polka dot jersey as leader of the mountains classification in the 2006 Tour de France

In the 2006 Tour de France, he finished well overall but he was not team leader; that honour went to the Russian, Denis Menchov. Rasmussen won the mountains classification for the second year and claimed stage 16 in the process. On Stage 16 he broke away after 4 km and took the Souvenir Henri Desgrange on the Col du Galibier (2645 m), winning 5000 euros. He led over all the climbs and won stage 16 by more than a minute on Carlos Sastre of Team CSC. In Paris he wore the polka dot jersey as leader of the mountains classification while holding his newly born child, who was in a polka-dot shirt and cap.

=== 2007 ===
In the 2007 Tour de France he won the 8th stage from Le Grand-Bornand to Tignes, taking the lead in the general classification and the mountains classification. On 25 July, he held a 3:10 lead on Alberto Contador, who was in second place for the yellow jersey. With four stages remaining, this made him favourite for the yellow jersey in Paris. That evening however, he was withdrawn from the race and fired by his team Rabobank for "violating internal rules". Davide Cassani, an Italian retired professional rider, reported that he had seen Rasmussen in Italy in June 2007, a time when Rasmussen claimed to have been training in Mexico. The accusations were denied.

== Controversy ==
=== Unavailability for doping controls ===
Rasmussen was the center of controversy while wearing the yellow jersey in the 2007 Tour de France, when it was announced that he had been suspended from the Danish national cycling team at UCI World Championships and Olympic Games following missed doping controls. Rasmussen failed to report his whereabouts for a three-week training session in Mexico and was unavailable for testing during that period; for that he received a recorded warning from the UCI. Counting these missed tests together, the Danish cycling union decided to ban Rasmussen. Rasmussen said: "I do admit that I've committed an administrative error. I was informed of this at the Danish championship two and a half weeks ago, so it's no news... It might be a surprise that it comes out right now." The timing of the announcement led to speculation by Patrice Clerc, then chief of the Amaury Sport Organisation, which organises the Tour de France, that the UCI had leaked the news in the middle of the Tour to damage it, as part of a dispute between the two organisations over the running of the UCI ProTour. This was rejected by the UCI president Pat McQuaid, who said the timing was the choice of the Danish cycling union.

=== Alleged doping in 2002 ===
According to a multiple sourced VeloNews article published on 20 July 2007, mountain bike racer Whitney Richards accused Rasmussen of trying to get him to transport a box, which Rasmussen had told Richards contained his favourite cycling shoes, to his training base in Italy in early 2002. Richards alleged that the box contained packets of Hemopure, a bovine-hemoglobin-based blood substitute which is not currently approved for human use outside South Africa and did not become commercially available there until January 2006, and which might potentially have been used in a doping program. At the time there was no screening test for Hemopure; it is, however, banned by the WADA. Richards said he destroyed the Hemopure, at which Rasmussen is said to have grown angry and said to Richards "Have you any idea how much that shit cost?"

A second journalist confirmed that Richards had related the same story to him over two years ago, off the record, and claims that the incident is the one described in the epilogue of journalist David Walsh's recent book From Lance to Landis. Rasmussen had declined to comment on the story, saying only, "I cannot confirm any of that."

=== Removal from the 2007 Tour ===
On 25 July 2007, Rasmussen won stage 16 of the 2007 Tour de France. He had led the general classification (overall lead) since winning Stage 8, and with a lead of over three minutes over second-place Alberto Contador, he was all but assured of winning. However, hours after his win, Rabobank abruptly fired him and removed him from the race. Previously, an Italian cycling commentator for RAI and former professional road bicycle racer, Davide Cassani, telling a story about Rasmussen's intense preparations for the Tour, stated he had seen Rasmussen in the Italian Dolomites on 13 June 2007, cycling in the rain. According to the schedule Rasmussen submitted to the UCI, he should have been in Mexico at that time. When confronted with this accusation, according to initial press reports, Rasmussen admitted the facts to his team leader, which resulted in Rasmussen's removal from the team and the Tour. Rasmussen himself later first denied that he had admitted any such thing, stating that Rabobank manager Theo de Rooij "was a desperate man on the verge of a nervous breakdown," but later admitted lying about his whereabouts. Two days later on 27 July it was reported, that Theo de Rooij had resigned, effective once the tour was over. Rasmussen's in-laws later confirmed to the Danish newspaper BT that he had visited them in Mexico, but that they did not know where exactly he had been on 13 and 14 June 2007. Rabobank backed the decision to withdraw Rasmussen but reconfirmed its commitment as a sponsor in cycling, at least at the local level.

On 17 December 2007, the Dutch law firm BrantjesVeerman confirmed Rasmussen had hired it to fight his dismissal from Rabobank.

On 1 July 2008 the Monaco Cycling Federation, which holds Rasmussen's racing license, announced that he was banned from the sport for two years from his exclusion from the Tour de France; the ban ended on 25 July 2009. Rasmussen appealed the ban to the Court of Arbitration for Sport, which upheld the ban on 22 January 2009.

== 2009 return ==
Rasmussen's suspension expired on 25 July 2009, and he took part in the Designa Grand Prix in Kjellerup, Denmark, just two days later where he finished in second place. Later that season, he won the opening stage, a time trial, and was race leader for three days, in the Mexico's Vuelta a Chihuahua, as a member of Team Tecos Trek. The following season, he signed for the Italian Continental ranked team, Miche Silver Cross.

On 30 July 2010 Michael Rasmussen got a personal sponsor in Christina Design London. On 9 December 2010, Rasmussen and Christina Design owner Christina Hembo presented their new team Christina Watches–Onfone. Hembo received a UCI Continental licence and announced the goal to become a UCI Pro Tour team by 2016.

== Doping admission ==
On 31 January 2013, he admitted to the use of performance-enhancing drugs from 1998 to 2010 during a press conference. He stated that he used EPO, growth hormone, testosterone, DHEA, insulin, IGF-1, cortisone and did blood transfusions. He also stated that his cycling career was over and that he wanted to cooperate fully with the Danish anti-doping institutions. The Danish Authorities stated that they would be looking to enforce a two-year ban, reduced from the normal eight-year ban in exchange for revealing what he knew about other illegal doping activities.

In September 2013 it was confirmed by Danmarks Idræts-Forbund (DIF) that he would receive a 2-year ban from 8 February 2013 to 7 February 2015 and would be stripped of results from January 2005 to March 2010. This decision has yet to be ratified by Danish Anti Doping (ADD) or the UCI.

== Major results ==
=== Mountain bike ===
1999
1st Cross-country, UCI World Championships

=== Road ===
2001
2nd Overall Jadranska Magistrala

1st Stage 2

2nd Overall Tour de Croatie
9th Gran Premio di Lugano
2002
3rd Giro dell'Emilia
4th Overall Vuelta a Burgos

1st Stage 4

4th Giro del Friuli
5th Giro del Veneto
7th Coppa Ugo Agostoni
7th Klasika Primavera
9th Japan Cup
2003
1st Mountains classification, Volta a Catalunya
4th Road race, National Championships
7th Overall Vuelta a España

1st Stage 7

7th Overall Tour of the Basque Country
7th Overall Setmana Catalana de Ciclisme
9th Clásica de San Sebastián
2004
7th Overall Critérium du Dauphiné Libéré

1st Mountains classification
1st Stage 6

Combativity award Stages 13 & 15 Tour de France
2005
1st RaboRonde Heerlen
7th Overall Tour de France

1st Mountains classification
1st Stage 9
Combativity award Stage 9

2006
Tour de France

1st Mountains classification
1st Stage 16
Combativity award Stage 16

2007
Tour de France

1st Stages 8 & 16
Held after Stages 8–16 (Note: Withdrawn from the race after stage 16 while still leading general classification.)
Combativity award Stage 8

2009
6th Overall Vuelta Chihuahua Internacional

1st Prologue

2010
8th Overall Tour de San Luis
2011
2nd Overall Tour de Serbie

1st Stage 3

4th Overall Tour of Norway
4th Overall Brixia Tour
8th Overall GP Herning
8th Overall Himmerland Rundt
2012
1st Ringerike GP
3rd Overall Tour of China I

1st Stage 1 (TTT)

8th Overall Tour de Serbie

=== Grand Tour general classification results timeline ===
Grand Tour	2002	2003	2004	2005	2006	2007
Giro d'Italia	45	—	—	DNF	DNF	48
Tour de France	—	—	14	7	17	DNF
Vuelta a España	—	7	—	—	DNF	—

Legend
—	Did not compete
DNF	Did not finish

== See also ==
- List of doping cases in cycling
- Sports in Denmark
