= Mikel Astarloza =

Spanish cyclist

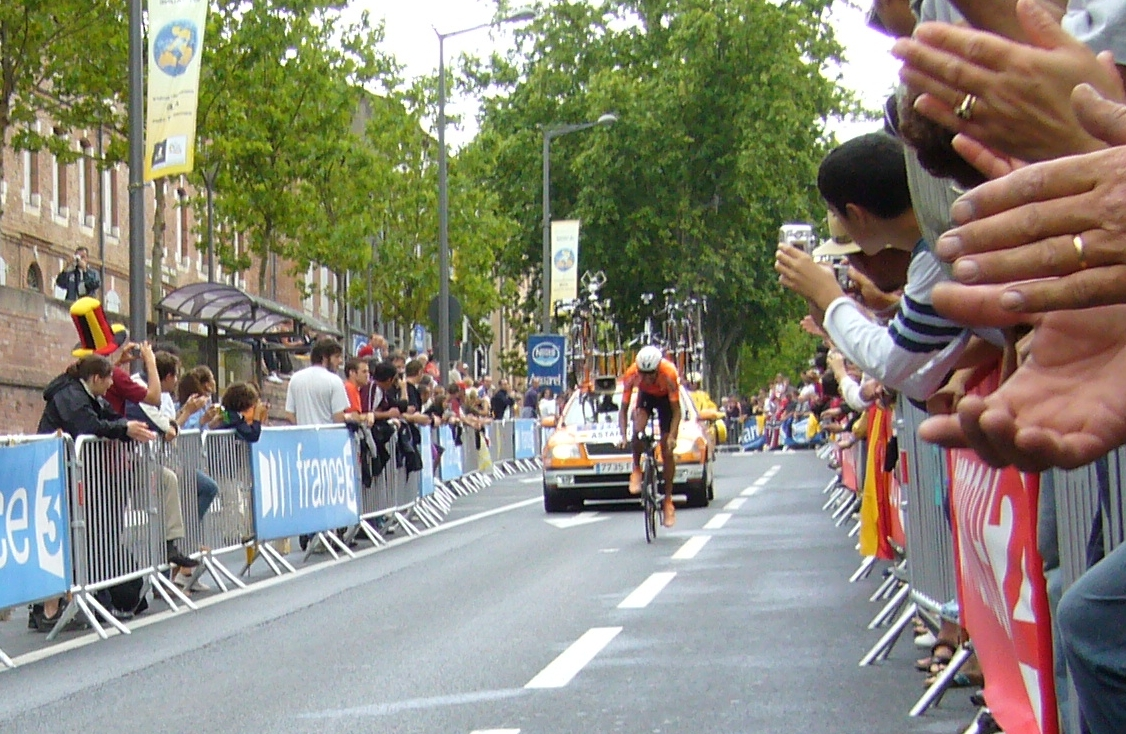
- Astarloza at the 2007 Tour de France.

Personal information
- Full name: Mikel Astarloza Chaurreau
- Born: 17 November 1979 (age 46) Gipuzkoa, Basque Country, Spain
- Height: 1.86 m (6 ft 1 in)
- Weight: 72 kg (159 lb; 11.3 st)

Cycling career
- Sport: Cycling
- Current team: Retired
- Discipline: Road
- Role: Rider

Professional teams
- 2002–2006: AG2R Prévoyance
- 2007–2009: Euskaltel–Euskadi
- 2011–2013: Euskaltel–Euskadi

Major wins
- Tour Down Under (2003)

Mikel Astarloza Chaurreau (born 17 November 1979 in Gipuzkoa, Basque Country) is a Spanish former professional road bicycle racer, who competed as a professional between 2002 and 2009, and 2011 to 2013.

== Career ==
In 2003 he won his first race, when he finished just in front of Lennie Kristensen in the overall rankings of the Tour Down Under. He has taken part in all editions of the Tour de France since 2003, and won stage 16 of the 2009 Tour to record his second professional stage win in any competition (for the Euskaltel team), with his 9th position overall in 2007 as his next best attempt. His cousin Íñigo Chaurreau is also a professional cyclist.

On 26 June 2009 he tested positive on Recombinant Erythropoietin (EPO), for which he was suspended by the UCI on 31 July 2009. Astarloza denied using EPO, saying that it was "sporting suicide" to use illegal performance-enhancing drugs. On 15 May 2010, he was formally handed a two-year ban by the Spanish Cycling Federation. Astarloza continually claimed his innocence, and Euskaltel-Euskadi stated that they would rehire him once the ban ended. He indeed rejoined the Basque team in August 2011, at the Vuelta a Burgos.

Astarloza was selected to ride the 2012 Tour de France, but crashed on a big pile-up in stage 6 with 25 km (16 mi) remaining with a fractured right elbow and did not finish the stage.

On 1 October 2013 Astarloza announced that he would retire from professional cycling after the 2013 Tour of Beijing.

== Career achievements ==
=== Major results ===
2003
1st Overall Tour Down Under
3rd Time trial, National Road Championships
2005
7th Overall Bayern Rundfahrt
2007
7th Overall Critérium du Dauphiné Libéré
9th Overall Tour de France
10th Overall Volta a la Comunitat Valenciana
2008
4th Overall Vuelta a Andalucía
4th Klasika Primavera
5th Overall Tour de Romandie
6th Overall Tour of the Basque Country
7th Overall Critérium du Dauphiné Libéré
2009
4th Klasika Primavera

=== Grand Tour general classification results timeline ===
| Grand Tour | 2002 | 2003 | 2004 | 2005 | 2006 | 2007 | 2008 | 2009 | 2012 | 2013 |
|---|---|---|---|---|---|---|---|---|---|---|
| Giro d'Italia | — | — | — | — | — | — | — | — | — | — |
| Tour de France | — | 29 | 62 | 27 | 35 | 9 | 16 | ~~11~~ | DNF | 42 |
| Vuelta a España | 77 | — | DNF | — | 56 | — | 28 | — | 48 | — |

Legend
| — | Did not compete |
| DNF | Did not finish |
