= Patrice Clerc =

Patrice Clerc (born 12 May 1949, in Neuilly-sur-Seine) is a past president of the Amaury Sport Organisation which promotes a number of professional cycling events including the Tour de France. Previously, Clerc served as president and tournament director of the French Open (Roland Garros) tennis tournament from 1984-2000. On September 9, 2009, he was appointed to the supervisory board of the Paris Saint-Germain.
