= Maxime Bouet =

French road bicycle racer

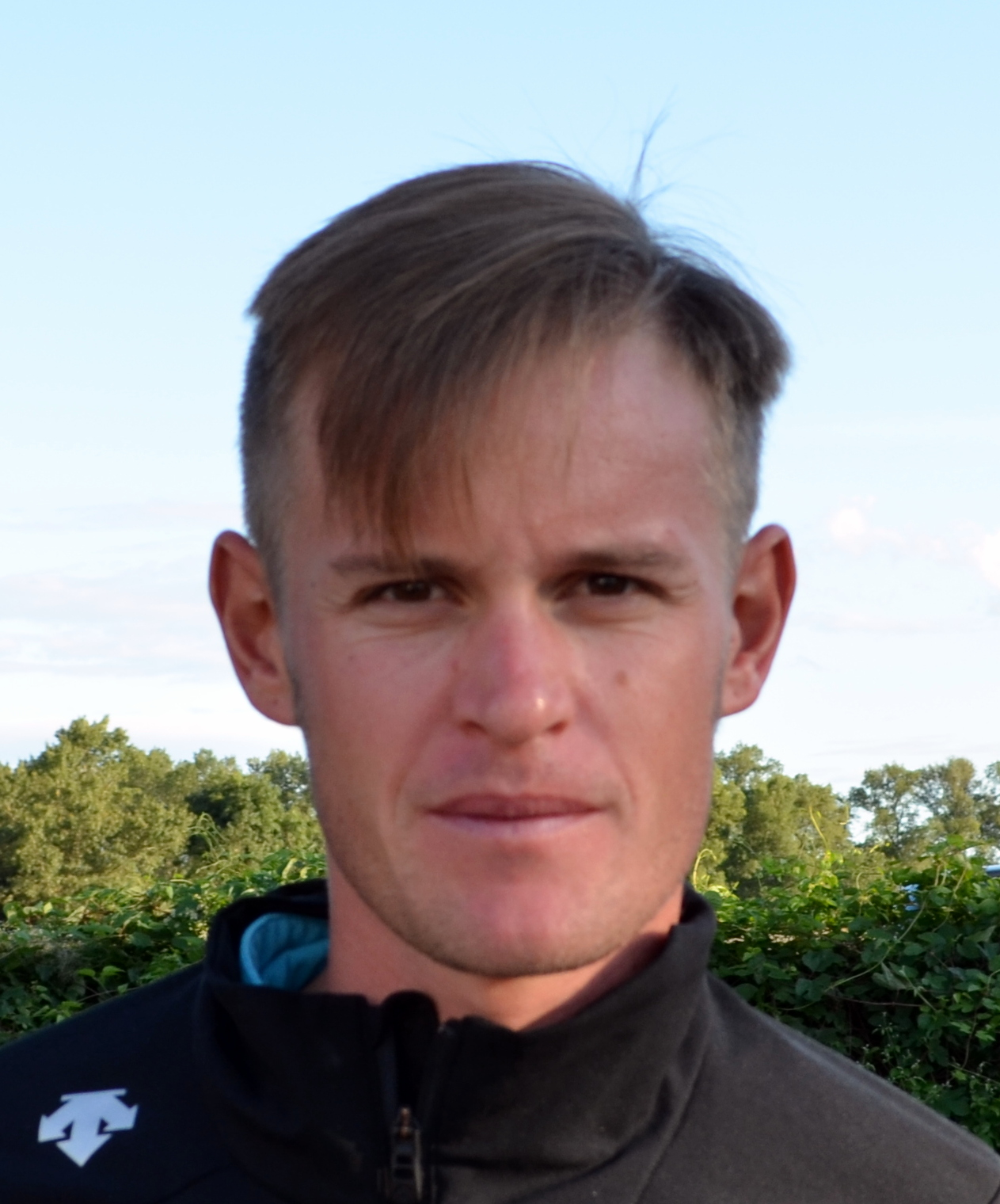
- Bouet at the 2014 Tour de l'Ain

Personal information
- Full name: Maxime Bouet
- Nickname: Le Blond
- Born: 3 November 1986 (age 40) Belley, France
- Height: 1.83 m (6 ft 0 in)
- Weight: 66 kg (146 lb; 10 st 6 lb)

Cycling career
- Sport: Cycling
- Discipline: Road
- Role: Rider
- Rider type: Puncheur

Amateur teams
- 2002: Lyon Sprint Evolution
- 2003: Chambéry Cyclisme Formation
- 2004: Vélo-Club La Pomme Marseille
- 2005: Chambéry Cyclisme Formation
- 2006–2007: Vélo-Club La Pomme Marseille
- 2007: Agritubel (stagiaire)

Professional teams
- 2008–2009: Agritubel
- 2010–2014: Ag2r–La Mondiale
- 2015–2016: Etixx–Quick-Step
- 2017–2023: Fortuneo–Vital Concept

Maxime Bouet (French: [maksim bwɛ]; born 3 November 1986) is a French former road racing cyclist, who competed as a professional from 2008 to 2023.

== Career ==
=== Early years ===
Born in Belley, Ain, Bouet participated at the French national track and road championships as a junior in 2003. At the track championships he won the silver medal in the individual pursuit, while at the road championships he took the bronze medal at the individual time trial. In the following year (2004) he improved both results, winning the gold medal in the individual pursuit and the silver medal in the individual time trial. In January 2006 Bouet took part in the La Tropicale Amissa Bongo, a stage race in Gabon where he finished in 15th position overall. That same year, on 1 May he finished 19th in the under-23 version of Liège–Bastogne–Liège. He also reached the fourth position of the sixth stage in the Giro della Valle d'Aosta, an individual time trial over 10.1 kilometres (6.3 miles) where he finished 51 seconds behind winner Dan Martin.

=== Agritubel (2007–09) ===
==== 2007 season ====
During the 2007 cycling season Bouet signed a contract with Agritubel as a stagiaire. His first notable result for them was when he reached the fourth place in the general classification of the Rhône-Alpes Isère Tour. He then came third in the first three stages of the Bidasoa Itzulia, the second stage of the Tour du Chablais, the third and fourth stages of the Ronde de l'Isard as well as the general classification of that last race.

==== 2008 season ====
Agritubel offered him a professional contract for the 2008 season in which he started off with a 20th place at the Grand Prix d'Ouverture La Marseillaise. After gaining more experience in the Tour Méditerranéen (19th), the Tour du Haut Var (47th), the Les 3 Jours de Vaucluse (17th) and the Volta ao Distrito de Santarém (116th) he won his first professional race on 24 March during the first stage of the Tour de Normandie, a 5.8-kilometre (3.6-mile) prologue in and around Mondeville. The six seconds he was ahead of Jos van Emden were enough to keep him in the leader's jersey for the next two days. He finished sixth in the Rhône-Alpes Isère Tour, 11th in the Clásica Internacional de Alcobendas and fourth in the Circuit de Lorraine. In the last couple of months of the season he finished second in the individual pursuit at the French National Track Championships and third in the second stage of the Tour de l'Ain. He was called up to represent France at the under-23 race of the 2008 UCI Road World Championships in Varese where he came in 83rd place in a race that was won by Fabio Duarte.

==== 2009 season ====
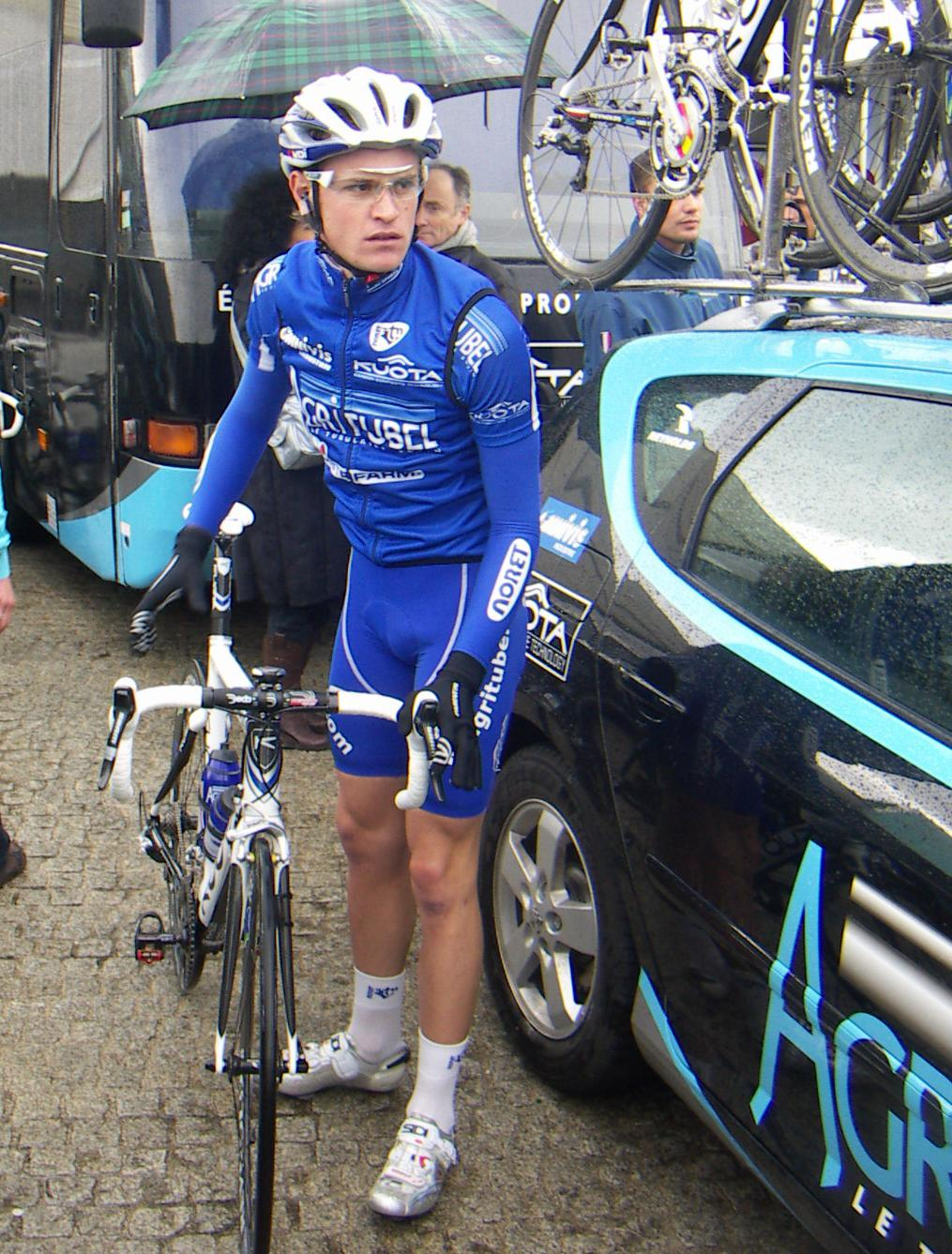
Bouet at the 2009 Grand Prix d'Ouverture La Marseillaise, during his last season with the French team Agritubel.

In 2009, his last season for Agritubel, Bouet also started off in the Grand Prix d'Ouverture La Marseillaise, this time claiming the 7th spot, one minute and seven seconds behind winner Rémi Pauriol. That same month he finished 19th in the Tour du Haut Var and also won his first race of the season, the first stage of the Les 3 Jours de Vaucluse, including the leading jersey. In the end, he finished in the second spot behind teammate David Lelay. Bouet competed in his first Paris–Nice race afterwards, finishing in 64th position overall. At the Volta ao Alentejo Bouet won another stage race opener and wore the leader's jersey for two days until Héctor Guerra won the individual time trial in stage 3. However, with a third place in the 5th and last stage of the race he reclaimed the lead and took the overall win, one second ahead of Guerra. After finishing third in the general classification of the Rhône-Alpes Isère Tour Bouet focused on some of the classic races. He reached the finish of La Flèche Wallonne in 138th position, but did not finish Liège–Bastogne–Liège.

Bouet was added to the Tour de France shortlist for Agritubel and was preparing for his first grand tour. With a win in the Boucles de l'Aulne and a seventh place in the Grand Prix of Aargau Canton he confirmed his form and made the final selection. In the third stage from Marseille to La Grande-Motte, a race won by Mark Cavendish, Bouet sprinted in the bunch to a ninth position, earning him his first and only top ten result of the Tour de France that year. A great result in the 20th stage from Montélimar to Mont Ventoux in which he finished in 17th place, Bouet ultimately secured a 69th overall ranking when finishing on the Champs-Élysées in Paris the day after. The 2009 season for Bouet ended in August after he finished third in the second stage of the Tour de l'Ain where he claimed the 11th spot overall.

=== Ag2r–La Mondiale (2010–14) ===
==== 2010 season ====
For the 2010 season Bouet signed a new contract, this time with Ag2r–La Mondiale. Bouet started off with a 60th place in the GP d'Ouverture Marseillaise, 41st place in the Tour du Haut Var and a 14th spot in the Gran Premio dell'Insubria-Lugano. In the Gran Premio di Lugano he finished fourth in the same group as winner Roberto Ferrari, while in Paris–Nice he finished in 21st position overall. The next two months Bouet took part in a lot of one day classics like Milan–San Remo (152nd), Amstel Gold Race (88th), and La Flèche Wallonne (80th), but his best results were held in the GP Miguel Induráin (7th), the Circuit de Lorraine (9th) and the Boucles de l'Aulne (10th). The 45th place he finished at in the Critérium du Dauphiné was a preparation for the Tour de France where he finished in 105th place overall. In the second stage, however, that was completely held in Belgium on a route from Brussels to Spa he finished as the first rider of the peloton in second position, three minutes and 56 seconds after lone winner Sylvain Chavanel. In the sixth stage Bouet ended up in the breakaway group that got a huge gap ahead of the peloton. In the end Sérgio Paulinho took the win in that stage, running from Chambéry to Gap, with Bouet finishing in sixth place, three minutes and 20 seconds behind Paulinho, but still way ahead of the peloton that reached the finish line 14 minutes and 19 seconds later than Paulinho. In August that year he won the third stage of the Tour de l'Ain and came 11th overall.

==== 2011 season ====
2011 started with a 45th-place finish in the Grand Prix d'Ouverture La Marseillaise, followed by eighth position in the Étoile de Bessèges and a 15th place in the Tour du Haut Var. These results were followed by another eighth position in the Gran Premio dell'Insubria-Lugano, a 13th place in the Gran Premio di Lugano and a 60th place overall in Paris–Nice. Other main races he competed in were the Volta a Catalunya (35th), the Flèche d'Emeraude (16th), the Amstel Gold Race (124th), the Tour de Romandie (89th), the Bayern–Rundfahrt (13th) and the Critérium du Dauphiné (23rd). Before the Tour de France started Bouet finished 5th in the French National Road Race Championships. In the Tour de France he did not come up with remarkable results, but reached Paris in 54th position overall. Soon after the Tour de France finished he reached the third place in the Bordeaux Criterium, 15th in the Grand Prix de Fourmies, 14th in the Grand Prix de Wallonie, fourth in the Gran Premio Industria e Commercio di Prato as well as third in the Tour de Vendée.

==== 2012 season ====
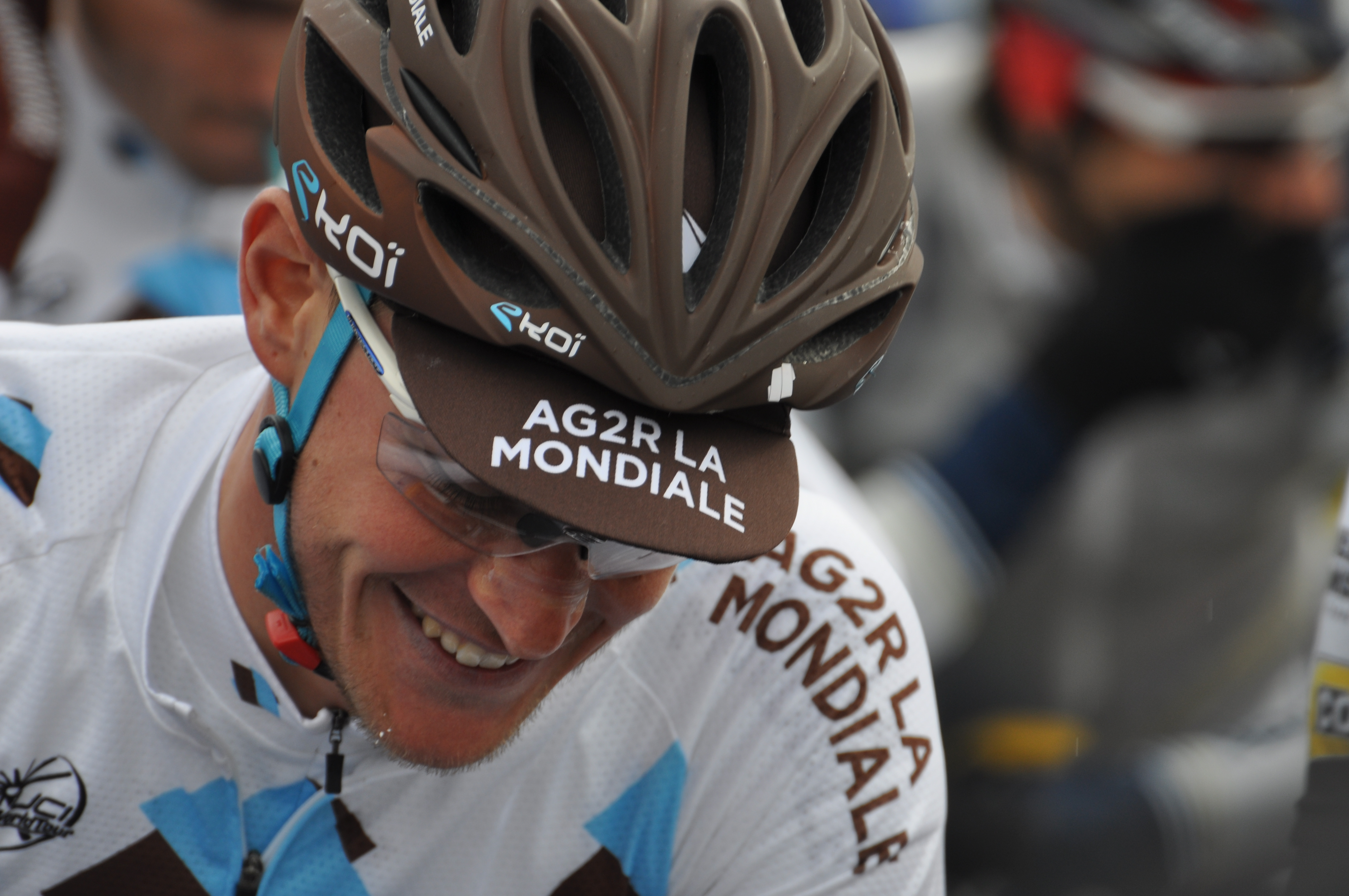
Bouet at the 2012 Grand Prix d'Ouverture La Marseillaise.

Bouet started with 21st position in the Grand Prix d'Ouverture La Marseillaise and finished third in the individual time trial part of the 5th stage in the Étoile de Bessèges. In the Tour du Haut Var he finished in eighth position, while he finished 12th in the Gran Premio di Lugano. He went on to perform well in Paris–Nice where he reached the 14th spot overall, followed by a 12th place in the Critérium International.

=== Etixx–Quick-Step (2015–16) ===
In August 2014 Omega Pharma–Quick-Step announced that Bouet would join them on a two-year contract from 2015, latterly known as Etixx–Quick-Step, with a role as a domestique for Rigoberto Urán and with a view to eventually compete for stage wins in races such as the Critérium du Dauphiné and the Tour of the Basque Country.

=== Fortuneo–Vital Concept (2017–2023) ===
In August 2016 Bouet announced that he was following team-mate Gianni Meersman to Fortuneo–Vital Concept, joining the team with an initial two-year deal from 2017. The move reunited him with team manager Emmanuel Hubert, who signed him to his first professional contract when he was in charge of Agritubel. In his announcement he expressed a desire to race as a team leader with the French squad. With his new team he participated in the 2017 Tour de France, placing 55th in the general classification.

Bouet retired at the end of the 2023 season, after 16 seasons as a professional.

== Major results ==
2003
2nd Individual pursuit, National Junior Track Championships
3rd Time trial, National Junior Road Championships
2004
1st Individual pursuit, National Junior Track Championships
2nd Time trial, National Junior Road Championships
2nd Classique des Alpes
2007
3rd Overall Ronde de l'Isard
4th Overall Rhône-Alpes Isère Tour
10th Paris–Mantes-en-Yvelines
2008
1st Stage 1 (ITT) Tour de Normandie
2nd Individual pursuit, National Track Championships
4th Overall Circuit de Lorraine
6th Overall Rhône-Alpes Isère Tour
2009
1st Overall Volta ao Alentejo

1st Stage 1

1st Boucles de l'Aulne
2nd Overall Les 3 Jours de Vaucluse

1st Stage 1

3rd Overall Rhône-Alpes Isère Tour
7th Grand Prix d'Ouverture La Marseillaise
7th Grand Prix of Aargau Canton
2010
1st Stage 3 Tour de l'Ain
4th Gran Premio di Lugano
7th GP Miguel Induráin
9th Overall Circuit de Lorraine
10th Boucles de l'Aulne
2011
3rd Tour de Vendée
4th Gran Premio Industria e Commercio di Prato
5th Road race, National Road Championships
8th Overall Étoile de Bessèges
8th Gran Premio dell'Insubria-Lugano
2012
5th Overall Étoile de Bessèges
8th Overall Tour du Haut Var
2013
3rd Overall Giro del Trentino

1st Stage 1a

6th Grand Prix d'Ouverture La Marseillaise
7th Overall Critérium International
10th Overall Tour of Oman
2014
3rd Time trial, National Road Championships
6th Gran Premio di Lugano
2015
Combativity award Stage 12 Vuelta a España
2016
7th Trofeo Serra de Tramuntana
9th Overall Tour du Haut Var
2017
2nd Grand Prix d'Ouverture La Marseillaise
6th Overall Tour de Savoie Mont-Blanc
7th Overall Tour de l'Ain
9th Overall Giro di Toscana
10th Overall Tour La Provence
2018
6th Overall Tour de Savoie Mont-Blanc

1st Stage 1

9th Overall Tour Poitou-Charentes en Nouvelle-Aquitaine
2021
7th Overall Volta ao Algarve
2022
6th GP Industria & Artigianato
9th Overall Tour de la Provence

=== Grand Tour general classification results timeline ===
Grand Tour	2009	2010	2011	2012	2013	2014	2015	2016	2017	2018	2019	2020	2021	2022	2023
Giro d'Italia	—	—	—	—	—	38	47	—	—	—	—	—	—	—	80
Tour de France	70	106	55	55	DNF	—	—	—	55	42	74	—	—	50	
Vuelta a España	—	—	—	20	—	DNF	28	47	—	—	—	—	—	—	

Legend
—	Did not compete
DNF	Did not finish
