= List of teams and cyclists in the 2008 Tour de France =

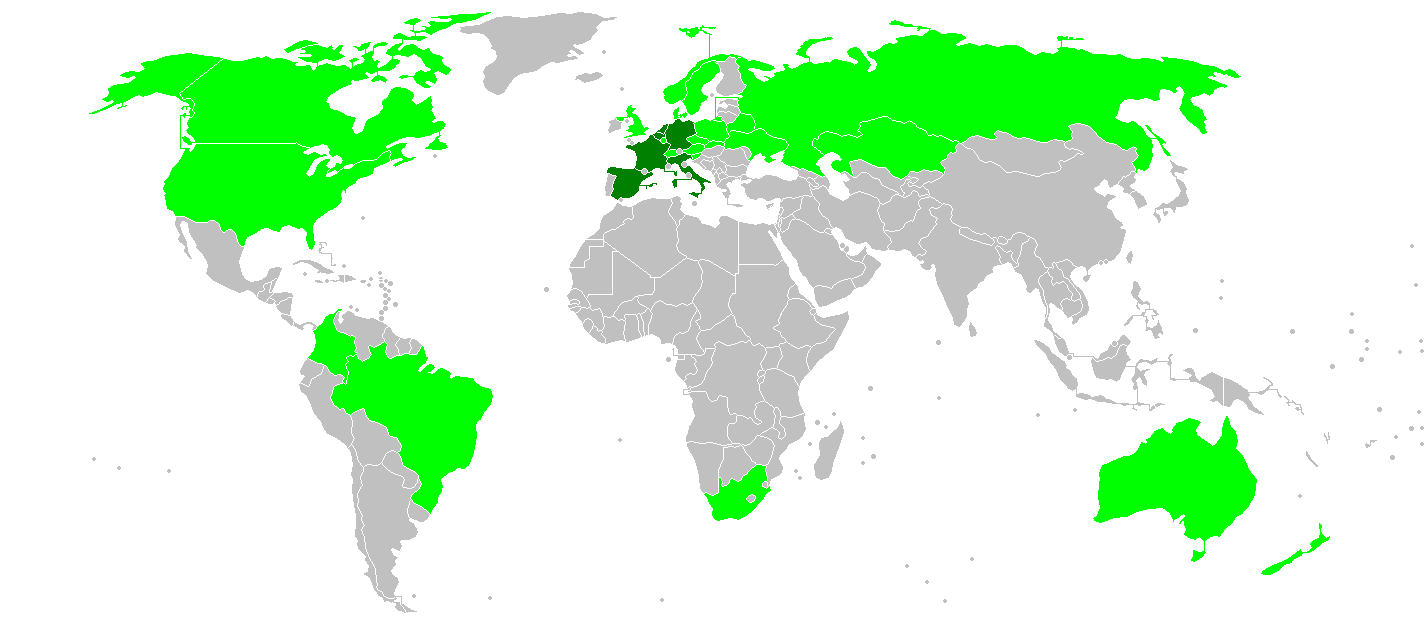
Country representation in 2008 Tour de France. Light green: 1–9; Green: 10+

The list of teams and cyclists in the 2008 Tour de France contains the professional road bicycle racers who will compete at the 2008 Tour de France from July 5 to July 27, 2008. Of the 18 UCI ProTour teams, only Astana was not invited. Additionally, Agritubel, Barloworld and Slipstream–Chipotle were given entries. The 20 teams invited to the race will enter a team of nine riders each, which will make up a total of 180 riders. The riders hail from 28 countries, with France (40), Spain (30) and Italy (21) having the highest representation.

== Teams ==
On July 1, the Tour de France announced the provisional start list for the 2008 Tour de France. Among the notable absentees were:

- the Astana Team, which includes two of the top three from the 2007 race, Alberto Contador and Levi Leipheimer, and Andreas Klöden, 2nd in the 2006 race.
- José Ángel Gómez Marchante, who would have been expected to be team leader for Saunier Duval–Scott, due to ill health.
- Thomas Dekker of Rabobank, dropped due to his poor performance in earlier 2008 races.
- Liquigas sprinter Daniele Bennati due to a persistent Achilles tendon problem.
- Tom Boonen of Quick Step, 2007 points classification winner, who was barred by the race organizers due to an out-of-competition positive cocaine test.

Age as of the start of race, 2008-07-05.

‡: Riders eligible for the Young Riders' competition, with birthdays on or after 1 January 1983.

Silence–Lotto (Belgium) SIL
Nr.		Age		Pos.
1	Cadel Evans	31	(Australia)	2
2	Mario Aerts	33	(Belgium)	31
3	Christophe Brandt	31	(Belgium)	DNF-19
4	Dario Cioni	33	(Italy)	83
5	Leif Hoste	30	(Belgium)	124
6	Robbie McEwen	36	(Australia)	122
7	Yaroslav Popovych	28	(Ukraine)	24
8	Johan Van Summeren	27	(Belgium)	87
9	Wim Vansevenant	36	(Belgium)	145
Team manager: Marc Sergeant

Team CSC Saxo Bank (Denmark) CSC
Nr.		Age		Pos.
11	Carlos Sastre	33	(Spain)	1
12	Kurt Asle Arvesen	33	(Norway)	57
13	Fabian Cancellara	27	(Switzerland)	65
14	Volodymyr Gustov	31	(Ukraine)	46
15	Stuart O'Grady	34	(Australia)	109
16	Andy Schleck	23‡	(Luxembourg)	12
17	Fränk Schleck	28	(Luxembourg)	6
18	Nicki Sørensen	33	(Denmark)	118
19	Jens Voigt	36	(Germany)	37
Team manager: Bjarne Riis

Euskaltel–Euskadi (Spain) EUS
Nr.		Age		Pos.
21	Haimar Zubeldia	31	(Spain)	45
22	Mikel Astarloza	28	(Spain)	16
23	Iñaki Isasi Flores	31	(Spain)	104
24	Egoi Martínez	30	(Spain)	50
25	Juan José Oroz	27	(Spain)	103
26	Rubén Pérez	26	(Spain)	91
27	Samuel Sánchez	30	(Spain)	7
28	Amets Txurruka	25	(Spain)	52
29	Gorka Verdugo	29	(Spain)	73
Team manager: Miguel Madariaga

Caisse d'Epargne (Spain) GCE
Nr.		Age		Pos.
31	Alejandro Valverde	28	(Spain)	9
32	David Arroyo	28	(Spain)	30
33	Arnaud Coyot	27	(France)	115
34	José Vicente García	35	(Spain)	141
35	Iván Gutiérrez	29	(Spain)	56
36	David López	27	(Spain)	51
37	Óscar Pereiro	30	(Spain)	DNF-15
38	Nicolas Portal	29	(France)	66
39	Luis León Sánchez	24‡	(Spain)	62
Team manager: Eusebio Unzué

Team Columbia (United States) THR
Nr.		Age		Pos.
41	Kim Kirchen	30	(Luxembourg)	8
42	Marcus Burghardt	25‡	(Germany)	120
43	Mark Cavendish	23‡	(United Kingdom)	DNS-15
44	Gerald Ciolek	21‡	(Germany)	106
45	Bernhard Eisel	27	(Austria)	144
46	Adam Hansen	27	(Australia)	108
47	George Hincapie	35	(United States)	35
48	Thomas Lövkvist	24‡	(Sweden)	41
49	Kanstantsin Sivtsov	25	(Belarus)	17
Team manager: Brian Holm

Barloworld (United Kingdom) BAR
Nr.		Age		Pos.
51	Mauricio Soler	25‡	(Colombia)	DNF-5
52	John-Lee Augustyn	21‡	(South Africa)	48
53	Félix Rafael Cárdenas	34	(Colombia)	DNF-11
54	Giampaolo Cheula	35	(Italy)	88
55	Baden Cooke	29	(Australia)	DNF-12
56	Moisés Dueñas	27	(Spain)	DNS-11
57	Chris Froome	23‡	(United Kingdom)	84
58	Robert Hunter	31	(South Africa)	107
59	Paolo Longo Borghini	27	(Italy)	DNF-11
Team manager: Claudio Corti

Liquigas (Italy) LIQ
Nr.		Age		Pos.
61	Filippo Pozzato	26	(Italy)	67
62	Manuel Beltrán	37	(Spain)	DNS-8
63	Francesco Chicchi	27	(Italy)	Elim-16
64	Murilo Fischer	29	(Brazil)	76
65	Roman Kreuziger	22‡	(Czech Republic)	13
66	Aliaksandr Kuchynski	28	(Belarus)	128
67	Vincenzo Nibali	23‡	(Italy)	20
68	Manuel Quinziato	28	(Italy)	130
69	Frederik Willems	28	(Belgium)	113
Team manager: Stefano Zanatta

Lampre (Italy) LAM
Nr.		Age		Pos.
71	Damiano Cunego	26	(Italy)	DNS-19
72	Alessandro Ballan	28	(Italy)	94
73	Matteo Bono	24‡	(Italy)	117
74	Marzio Bruseghin	34	(Italy)	27
75	Marco Marzano	28	(Italy)	92
76	Massimiliano Mori	34	(Italy)	140
77	Daniele Righi	32	(Italy)	127
78	Sylvester Szmyd	30	(Poland)	26
79	Paolo Tiralongo	30	(Italy)	49
Team manager: Giuseppe Saronni

Crédit Agricole (France) C.A
Nr.		Age		Pos.
81	Thor Hushovd	30	(Norway)	99
82	William Bonnet	26	(France)	102
83	Alexander Bocharov	33	(Russia)	18
84	Jimmy Engoulvent	28	(France)	138
85	Dmitry Fofonov	31	(Kazakhstan)	DNF
86	Simon Gerrans	28	(Australia)	79
87	Christophe Le Mével	27	(France)	40
88	Rémi Pauriol	26	(France)	80
89	Mark Renshaw	25	(Australia)	DNF-15
Team manager: Roger Legeay

Quick Step (Belgium) QST
Nr.		Age		Pos.
91	Stijn Devolder	28	(Belgium)	DNF-15
92	Carlos Barredo	27	(Spain)	89
93	Matteo Carrara	29	(Italy)	36
94	Steven de Jongh	34	(Netherlands)	125
95	Mauro Facci	26	(Italy)	DNF-7
96	Sébastien Rosseler	26	(Belgium)	98
97	Gert Steegmans	27	(Belgium)	111
98	Matteo Tosatto	34	(Italy)	96
99	Jurgen Van de Walle	31	(Belgium)	78
Team managers: Wilfried Peeters and Dirk Demol

AG2R La Mondiale (France) A2R
Nr.		Age		Pos.
101	Cyril Dessel	33	(France)	28
102	José Luis Arrieta	37	(Spain)	72
103	Hubert Dupont	27	(France)	55
104	Vladimir Efimkin	26	(Russia)	11
105	Martin Elmiger	29	(Switzerland)	71
106	John Gadret	29	(France)	DNF-7
107	Stéphane Goubert	38	(France)	21
108	Christophe Riblon	27	(France)	137
109	Tadej Valjavec	31	(Slovenia)	10
Team manager: Vincent Lavenu

Gerolsteiner (Germany) GST
Nr.		Age		Pos.
111	Stefan Schumacher	26	(Germany)	25
112	Robert Förster	30	(Germany)	116
113	Markus Fothen	26	(Germany)	33
114	Heinrich Haussler	24‡	(Germany)	126
115	Bernhard Kohl	26	(Austria)	3
116	Sven Krauss	25‡	(Germany)	143
117	Sebastian Lang	28	(Germany)	75
118	Ronny Scholz	30	(Germany)	93
119	Fabian Wegmann	28	(Germany)	Elim-19
Team manager: Hans-Michael Holczer

Agritubel (France) AGR
Nr.		Age		Pos.
121	Christophe Moreau	37	(France)	DNF-7
122	Freddy Bichot	28	(France)	135
123	Jimmy Casper	30	(France)	Elim-17
124	Romain Feillu	24‡	(France)	Elim-19
125	Eduardo Gonzalo	24‡	(Spain)	39
126	Nicolas Jalabert	35	(France)	DNF-14
127	David Lelay	28	(France)	81
128	Geoffroy Lequatre	27	(France)	85
129	Nicolas Vogondy	30	(France)	64
Team manager: Denis Leproux

Rabobank (Netherlands) RAB
Nr.		Age		Pos.
131	Denis Menchov	30	(Russia)	4
132	Juan Antonio Flecha	30	(Spain)	Elim-19
133	Óscar Freire	32	(Spain)	70
134	Sebastian Langeveld	23‡	(Netherlands)	131
135	Koos Moerenhout	34	(Netherlands)	34
136	Joost Posthuma	27	(Netherlands)	69
137	Bram Tankink	29	(Netherlands)	60
138	Laurens ten Dam	27	(Netherlands)	22
139	Pieter Weening	27	(Netherlands)	63
Team manager: Erik Breukink

Bouygues Télécom (France) BTL
Nr.		Age		Pos.
141	Pierrick Fédrigo	29	(France)	32
142	Stef Clement	25	(Netherlands)	90
143	Xavier Florencio	28	(Spain)	101
144	Laurent Lefèvre	32	(France)	86
145	Jérôme Pineau	28	(France)	38
146	Matthieu Sprick	26	(France)	142
147	Yuri Trofimov	24‡	(Russia)	DNF-10
148	Johann Tschopp	26	(Switzerland)	54
149	Thomas Voeckler	29	(France)	97
Team manager: Jean-René Bernaudeau

Team Milram (Germany) MRM
Nr.		Age		Pos.
151	Erik Zabel	37	(Germany)	43
152	Ralf Grabsch	35	(Germany)	123
153	Christian Knees	27	(Germany)	29
154	Brett Lancaster	28	(Australia)	129
155	Martin Müller	34	(Germany)	105
156	Björn Schröder	27	(Germany)	100
157	Niki Terpstra	24‡	(Netherlands)	136
158	Peter Velits	23‡	(Slovakia)	58
159	Marco Velo	34	(Italy)	44
Team manager: Gerry van Gerwen

Française des Jeux (France) FDJ
Nr.		Age		Pos.
161	Sandy Casar	29	(France)	14
162	Sébastien Chavanel	27	(France)	DNF-16
163	Rémy Di Gregorio	22‡	(France)	59
164	Arnaud Gérard	23‡	(France)	132
165	Philippe Gilbert	26	(Belgium)	112
166	Lilian Jégou	32	(France)	DNF-7
167	Yoann Le Boulanger	32	(France)	74
168	Jérémy Roy	25‡	(France)	121
169	Benoît Vaugrenard	26	(France)	82
Team manager:Marc Madiot

Saunier Duval–Scott (Spain) SDV
Nr.		Age		Pos.
171	Riccardo Riccò	24‡	(Italy)	DNS-12
172	Rubens Bertogliati	29	(Switzerland)	DNS-12
173	Juan José Cobo	27	(Spain)	DNS-12
174	David de la Fuente	27	(Spain)	DNS-12
175	Jesus del Nero	26	(Spain)	DNS-12
176	Ángel Gómez	27	(Spain)	DNF-3
177	Josep Jufré	32	(Spain)	DNS-12
178	Aurélien Passeron	24‡	(France)	DNS-6
179	Leonardo Piepoli	36	(Italy)	DNS-12
Team manager: Mauro Gianetti

Cofidis, Le Crédit par Téléphone (France) COF
Nr.		Age		Pos.
181	Sylvain Chavanel	29	(France)	61
182	Stéphane Augé	33	(France)	139
183	Florent Brard	32	(France)	119
184	Hervé Duclos-Lassalle	28	(France)	DNF-1
185	Samuel Dumoulin	27	(France)	114
186	Leonardo Duque	28	(Colombia)	53
187	David Moncoutié	33	(France)	42
188	Amaël Moinard	26	(France)	15
189	Maxime Monfort	25‡	(Belgium)	23
Team manager: Éric Boyer

== Cyclists ==
No.	Name	Nationality	Team	Age	Pos.
1	Cadel Evans	Australia	Silence–Lotto	31	2
2	Mario Aerts	Belgium	Silence–Lotto	33	31
3	Christophe Brandt	Belgium	Silence–Lotto	31	DNF-19
4	Dario Cioni	Italy	Silence–Lotto	33	83
5	Leif Hoste	Belgium	Silence–Lotto	30	124
6	Robbie McEwen	Australia	Silence–Lotto	36	122
7	Yaroslav Popovych	Ukraine	Silence–Lotto	28	24
8	Johan Van Summeren	Belgium	Silence–Lotto	27	87
9	Wim Vansevenant	Belgium	Silence–Lotto	36	145
11	Carlos Sastre	Spain	Team CSC Saxo Bank	33	1
12	Kurt Asle Arvesen	Norway	Team CSC Saxo Bank	33	57
13	Fabian Cancellara	Switzerland	Team CSC Saxo Bank	27	65
14	Volodymyr Gustov	Ukraine	Team CSC Saxo Bank	31	46
15	Stuart O'Grady	Australia	Team CSC Saxo Bank	34	109
16	Andy Schleck	Luxembourg	Team CSC Saxo Bank	23‡	12
17	Fränk Schleck	Luxembourg	Team CSC Saxo Bank	28	6
18	Nicki Sørensen	Denmark	Team CSC Saxo Bank	33	118
19	Jens Voigt	Germany	Team CSC Saxo Bank	36	37
21	Haimar Zubeldia	Spain	Euskaltel–Euskadi	31	45
22	Mikel Astarloza	Spain	Euskaltel–Euskadi	28	16
23	Iñaki Isasi Flores	Spain	Euskaltel–Euskadi	31	104
24	Egoi Martínez	Spain	Euskaltel–Euskadi	30	50
25	Juan José Oroz	Spain	Euskaltel–Euskadi	27	103
26	Rubén Pérez	Spain	Euskaltel–Euskadi	26	91
27	Samuel Sánchez	Spain	Euskaltel–Euskadi	30	7
28	Amets Txurruka	Spain	Euskaltel–Euskadi	25	52
29	Gorka Verdugo	Spain	Euskaltel–Euskadi	29	73
31	Alejandro Valverde	Spain	Caisse d'Epargne	28	9
32	David Arroyo	Spain	Caisse d'Epargne	28	30
33	Arnaud Coyot	France	Caisse d'Epargne	27	115
34	José Vicente García	Spain	Caisse d'Epargne	35	141
35	Iván Gutiérrez	Spain	Caisse d'Epargne	29	56
36	David López	Spain	Caisse d'Epargne	27	51
37	Óscar Pereiro	Spain	Caisse d'Epargne	30	DNF-15
38	Nicolas Portal	France	Caisse d'Epargne	29	66
39	Luis León Sánchez	Spain	Caisse d'Epargne	24‡	62
41	Kim Kirchen	Luxembourg	Team Columbia	30	8
42	Marcus Burghardt	Germany	Team Columbia	25‡	120
43	Mark Cavendish	Great Britain	Team Columbia	23‡	DNS-15
44	Gerald Ciolek	Germany	Team Columbia	21‡	106
45	Bernhard Eisel	Austria	Team Columbia	27	144
46	Adam Hansen	Australia	Team Columbia	27	108
47	George Hincapie	United States	Team Columbia	35	35
48	Thomas Lövkvist	Sweden	Team Columbia	24‡	41
49	Kanstantsin Sivtsov	Belarus	Team Columbia	25	17
51	Mauricio Soler	Colombia	Barloworld	25‡	DNF-5
52	John-Lee Augustyn	South Africa	Barloworld	21‡	48
53	Félix Rafael Cárdenas	Colombia	Barloworld	34	DNF-11
54	Giampaolo Cheula	Italy	Barloworld	35	88
55	Baden Cooke	Australia	Barloworld	29	DNF-12
56	Moisés Dueñas	Spain	Barloworld	27	DNS-11
57	Chris Froome	Great Britain	Barloworld	23‡	84
58	Robert Hunter	South Africa	Barloworld	31	107
59	Paolo Longo Borghini	Italy	Barloworld	27	DNF-11
61	Filippo Pozzato	Italy	Liquigas	26	67
62	Manuel Beltrán	Spain	Liquigas	37	DNS-8
63	Francesco Chicchi	Italy	Liquigas	27	Elim-16
64	Murilo Fischer	Brazil	Liquigas	29	76
65	Roman Kreuziger	Czech Republic	Liquigas	22‡	13
66	Aliaksandr Kuchynski	Belarus	Liquigas	28	128
67	Vincenzo Nibali	Italy	Liquigas	23‡	20
68	Manuel Quinziato	Italy	Liquigas	28	130
69	Frederik Willems	Belgium	Liquigas	28	113
71	Damiano Cunego	Italy	Lampre	26	DNS-19
72	Alessandro Ballan	Italy	Lampre	28	94
73	Matteo Bono	Italy	Lampre	24‡	117
74	Marzio Bruseghin	Italy	Lampre	34	27
75	Marco Marzano	Italy	Lampre	28	92
76	Massimiliano Mori	Italy	Lampre	34	140
77	Daniele Righi	Italy	Lampre	32	127
78	Sylvester Szmyd	Poland	Lampre	30	26
79	Paolo Tiralongo	Italy	Lampre	30	49
81	Thor Hushovd	Norway	Crédit Agricole	30	99
82	William Bonnet	France	Crédit Agricole	26	102
83	Alexander Bocharov	Russia	Crédit Agricole	33	18
84	Jimmy Engoulvent	France	Crédit Agricole	28	138
85	Dmitry Fofonov	Kazakhstan	Crédit Agricole	31	DNF
86	Simon Gerrans	Australia	Crédit Agricole	28	79
87	Christophe Le Mével	France	Crédit Agricole	27	40
88	Rémi Pauriol	France	Crédit Agricole	26	80
89	Mark Renshaw	Australia	Crédit Agricole	25	DNF-15
91	Stijn Devolder	Belgium	Quick Step	28	DNF-15
92	Carlos Barredo	Spain	Quick Step	27	89
93	Matteo Carrara	Italy	Quick Step	29	36
94	Steven de Jongh	Netherlands	Quick Step	34	125
95	Mauro Facci	Italy	Quick Step	26	DNF-7
96	Sébastien Rosseler	Belgium	Quick Step	26	98
97	Gert Steegmans	Belgium	Quick Step	27	111
98	Matteo Tosatto	Italy	Quick Step	34	96
99	Jurgen Van de Walle	Belgium	Quick Step	31	78
101	Cyril Dessel	France	AG2R La Mondiale	33	28
102	José Luis Arrieta	Spain	AG2R La Mondiale	37	72
103	Hubert Dupont	France	AG2R La Mondiale	27	55
104	Vladimir Efimkin	Russia	AG2R La Mondiale	26	11
105	Martin Elmiger	Switzerland	AG2R La Mondiale	29	71
106	John Gadret	France	AG2R La Mondiale	29	DNF-7
107	Stéphane Goubert	France	AG2R La Mondiale	38	21
108	Christophe Riblon	France	AG2R La Mondiale	27	137
109	Tadej Valjavec	Slovenia	AG2R La Mondiale	31	10
111	Stefan Schumacher	Germany	Gerolsteiner	26	25
112	Robert Förster	Germany	Gerolsteiner	30	116
113	Markus Fothen	Germany	Gerolsteiner	26	33
114	Heinrich Haussler	Germany	Gerolsteiner	24‡	126
115	Bernhard Kohl	Austria	Gerolsteiner	26	3
116	Sven Krauss	Germany	Gerolsteiner	25‡	143
117	Sebastian Lang	Germany	Gerolsteiner	28	75
118	Ronny Scholz	Germany	Gerolsteiner	30	93
119	Fabian Wegmann	Germany	Gerolsteiner	28	Elim-19
121	Christophe Moreau	France	Agritubel	37	DNF-7
122	Freddy Bichot	France	Agritubel	28	135
123	Jimmy Casper	France	Agritubel	30	Elim-17
124	Romain Feillu	France	Agritubel	24‡	Elim-19
125	Eduardo Gonzalo	Spain	Agritubel	24‡	39
126	Nicolas Jalabert	France	Agritubel	35	DNF-14
127	David Lelay	France	Agritubel	28	81
128	Geoffroy Lequatre	France	Agritubel	27	85
129	Nicolas Vogondy	France	Agritubel	30	64
131	Denis Menchov	Russia	Rabobank	30	4
132	Juan Antonio Flecha	Spain	Rabobank	30	Elim-19
133	Óscar Freire	Spain	Rabobank	32	70
134	Sebastian Langeveld	Netherlands	Rabobank	23‡	131
135	Koos Moerenhout	Netherlands	Rabobank	34	34
136	Joost Posthuma	Netherlands	Rabobank	27	69
137	Bram Tankink	Netherlands	Rabobank	29	60
138	Laurens ten Dam	Netherlands	Rabobank	27	22
139	Pieter Weening	Netherlands	Rabobank	27	63
141	Pierrick Fédrigo	France	Bouygues Télécom	29	32
142	Stef Clement	Netherlands	Bouygues Télécom	25	90
143	Xavier Florencio	Spain	Bouygues Télécom	28	101
144	Laurent Lefèvre	France	Bouygues Télécom	32	86
145	Jérôme Pineau	France	Bouygues Télécom	28	38
146	Matthieu Sprick	France	Bouygues Télécom	26	142
147	Yuri Trofimov	Russia	Bouygues Télécom	24‡	DNF-10
148	Johann Tschopp	Switzerland	Bouygues Télécom	26	54
149	Thomas Voeckler	France	Bouygues Télécom	29	97
151	Erik Zabel	Germany	Team Milram	37	43
152	Ralf Grabsch	Germany	Team Milram	35	123
153	Christian Knees	Germany	Team Milram	27	29
154	Brett Lancaster	Australia	Team Milram	28	129
155	Martin Müller	Germany	Team Milram	34	105
156	Björn Schröder	Germany	Team Milram	27	100
157	Niki Terpstra	Netherlands	Team Milram	24‡	136
158	Peter Velits	Slovakia	Team Milram	23‡	58
159	Marco Velo	Italy	Team Milram	34	44
161	Sandy Casar	France	Française des Jeux	29	14
162	Sébastien Chavanel	France	Française des Jeux	27	DNF-16
163	Rémy Di Gregorio	France	Française des Jeux	22‡	59
164	Arnaud Gérard	France	Française des Jeux	23‡	132
165	Philippe Gilbert	Belgium	Française des Jeux	26	112
166	Lilian Jégou	France	Française des Jeux	32	DNF-7
167	Yoann Le Boulanger	France	Française des Jeux	32	74
168	Jérémy Roy	France	Française des Jeux	25‡	121
169	Benoît Vaugrenard	France	Française des Jeux	26	82
171	Riccardo Riccò	Italy	Saunier Duval–Scott	24‡	DNS-12
172	Rubens Bertogliati	Switzerland	Saunier Duval–Scott	29	DNS-12
173	Juan José Cobo	Spain	Saunier Duval–Scott	27	DNS-12
174	David de la Fuente	Spain	Saunier Duval–Scott	27	DNS-12
175	Jesus del Nero	Spain	Saunier Duval–Scott	26	DNS-12
176	Ángel Gómez	Spain	Saunier Duval–Scott	27	DNF-3
177	Josep Jufré	Spain	Saunier Duval–Scott	32	DNS-12
178	Aurélien Passeron	France	Saunier Duval–Scott	24‡	DNS-6
179	Leonardo Piepoli	Italy	Saunier Duval–Scott	36	DNS-12
181	Sylvain Chavanel	France	Cofidis, Le Crédit par Téléphone	29	61
182	Stéphane Augé	France	Cofidis, Le Crédit par Téléphone	33	139
183	Florent Brard	France	Cofidis, Le Crédit par Téléphone	32	119
184	Hervé Duclos-Lassalle	France	Cofidis, Le Crédit par Téléphone	28	DNF-1
185	Samuel Dumoulin	France	Cofidis, Le Crédit par Téléphone	27	114
186	Leonardo Duque	Colombia	Cofidis, Le Crédit par Téléphone	28	53
187	David Moncoutié	France	Cofidis, Le Crédit par Téléphone	33	42
188	Amaël Moinard	France	Cofidis, Le Crédit par Téléphone	26	15
189	Maxime Monfort	Belgium	Cofidis, Le Crédit par Téléphone	25‡	23
191	Christian Vande Velde	United States	Garmin–Chipotle presented by H3O	32	5
192	Magnus Bäckstedt	Sweden	Garmin–Chipotle presented by H3O	33	Elim-7
193	Julian Dean	New Zealand	Garmin–Chipotle presented by H3O	33	110
194	Will Frischkorn	United States	Garmin–Chipotle presented by H3O	27	133
195	Ryder Hesjedal	Canada	Garmin–Chipotle presented by H3O	27	47
196	Trent Lowe	Australia	Garmin–Chipotle presented by H3O	23‡	77
197	Martijn Maaskant	Netherlands	Garmin–Chipotle presented by H3O	24‡	134
198	David Millar	Great Britain	Garmin–Chipotle presented by H3O	31	68
199	Danny Pate	United States	Garmin–Chipotle presented by H3O	28	95

== Summary of the field ==
- Euskaltel is the only team whose riders are all from one country (Spain); Teams CSC Saxo Bank and Columbia each represent eight nations among their nine riders.
- Óscar Pereiro is the only previous Tour winner, having won in 2006.
- Two other riders have won a Grand Tour race: Denis Menchov (Vuelta a España in 2005 and 2007) and Damiano Cunego (Giro d'Italia in 2004).
- Four riders have won the green jersey in previous Tours: Erik Zabel (six times), Robbie McEwen (three times), Baden Cooke and Thor Hushovd (once each).
- Only Mauricio Soler has previously won the Tour's King of the Mountains competition, in 2007.
- Three riders have won the maillot blanc: Menchov, Cunego and Yaroslav Popovych.
- 33 riders have won a Tour de France stage, and 13 have worn the yellow jersey.
- The youngest rider is Gerald Ciolek, at 21, and 38-year-old Stéphane Goubert is the eldest.
- Six riders in the field went on to win one or more Grand Tours, Cadel Evans, Andy Schleck, Alejandro Valverde, Chris Froome, Vincenzo Nibali and Juan José Cobo.
