= List of teams and cyclists in the 2006 Tour de France =

The list of teams and cyclists in the 2006 Tour de France contains the professional road bicycle racers who competed at the 2006 Tour de France from July 1 to July 23, 2006. In prior years, 21 teams of nine riders each have participated in the annual Tour de France, but following the Operación Puerto doping investigation, the Astana–Würth team as well as four individual riders (Ivan Basso (CSC), Jan Ullrich (TMO), Óscar Sevilla (TMO) and Francisco Mancebo (A2R)) were not allowed to start the race.

== Teams ==
- Discovery Channel
- Team CSC
- T-Mobile Team
- AG2R Prévoyance
- Gerolsteiner
- Rabobank
- Davitamon–Lotto
- Phonak
- Lampre–Fondital
- Caisse d'Epargne–Illes Balears
- Quick-Step–Innergetic
- Crédit Agricole
- Euskaltel–Euskadi
- Cofidis
- Saunier Duval–Prodir
- Française des Jeux
- Liquigas
- Bouygues Télécom
- Team Milram
- Agritubel

== Cyclists by starting number ==
No.	Name	Nationality	Team	Age	Pos.
1	José Azevedo	Portugal	Discovery Channel	32	19
2	Viatcheslav Ekimov	Russia	Discovery Channel	40	84
3	George Hincapie	United States	Discovery Channel	33	32
4	Egoi Martínez	Spain	Discovery Channel	28	42
5	Benjamín Noval	Spain	Discovery Channel	27	DNF
6	Pavel Padrnos	Czech Republic	Discovery Channel	35	65
7	Yaroslav Popovych	Ukraine	Discovery Channel	26	25
8	José Luis Rubiera	Spain	Discovery Channel	33	92
9	Paolo Savoldelli	Italy	Discovery Channel	33	DNF
11	Bobby Julich	United States	Team CSC	34	DNF
12	Giovanni Lombardi	Italy	Team CSC	37	DNF
13	Stuart O'Grady	Australia	Team CSC	32	91
14	Carlos Sastre	Spain	Team CSC	31	4
15	Fränk Schleck	Luxembourg	Team CSC	26	11
16	Christian Vande Velde	United States	Team CSC	30	24
17	Jens Voigt	Germany	Team CSC	34	53
18	David Zabriskie	United States	Team CSC	27	74
21	Andreas Klöden	Germany	T-Mobile Team	30	3
22	Giuseppe Guerini	Italy	T-Mobile Team	36	26
23	Serhiy Honchar	Ukraine	T-Mobile Team	35	52
24	Matthias Kessler	Germany	T-Mobile Team	27	54
25	Eddy Mazzoleni	Italy	T-Mobile Team	32	27
26	Michael Rogers	Australia	T-Mobile Team	26	10
27	Patrik Sinkewitz	Germany	T-Mobile Team	25	23
31	Christophe Moreau	France	AG2R Prévoyance	35	8
32	José Luis Arrieta	Spain	AG2R Prévoyance	35	28
33	Mikel Astarloza	Spain	AG2R Prévoyance	26	36
34	Sylvain Calzati	France	AG2R Prévoyance	27	34
35	Cyril Dessel	France	AG2R Prévoyance	31	7
36	Samuel Dumoulin	France	AG2R Prévoyance	25	120
37	Simon Gerrans	Australia	AG2R Prévoyance	26	79
38	Stéphane Goubert	France	AG2R Prévoyance	36	37
41	Levi Leipheimer	United States	Gerolsteiner	32	13
42	Markus Fothen	Germany	Gerolsteiner	24	15
43	David Kopp	Germany	Gerolsteiner	27	DNF
44	Sebastian Lang	Germany	Gerolsteiner	26	66
45	Ronny Scholz	Germany	Gerolsteiner	28	96
46	Georg Totschnig	Austria	Gerolsteiner	35	47
47	Fabian Wegmann	Germany	Gerolsteiner	26	68
48	Peter Wrolich	Austria	Gerolsteiner	32	135
49	Beat Zberg	Switzerland	Gerolsteiner	35	DNF
51	Denis Menchov	Russia	Rabobank	28	6
52	Michael Boogerd	Netherlands	Rabobank	34	14
53	Bram de Groot	Netherlands	Rabobank	31	DNF
54	Erik Dekker	Netherlands	Rabobank	35	DNF
55	Juan Antonio Flecha	Spain	Rabobank	28	82
56	Óscar Freire	Spain	Rabobank	30	DNF
57	Joost Posthuma	Netherlands	Rabobank	25	85
58	Michael Rasmussen	Denmark	Rabobank	32	18
59	Pieter Weening	Netherlands	Rabobank	25	93
61	Cadel Evans	Australia	Davitamon–Lotto	29	5
62	Mario Aerts	Belgium	Davitamon–Lotto	31	106
63	Christophe Brandt	Belgium	Davitamon–Lotto	29	40
64	Chris Horner	United States	Davitamon–Lotto	34	64
65	Robbie McEwen	Australia	Davitamon–Lotto	34	116
66	Fred Rodriguez	United States	Davitamon–Lotto	32	DNF
67	Gert Steegmans	Belgium	Davitamon–Lotto	25	137
68	Wim Vansevenant	Belgium	Davitamon–Lotto	34	139
69	Johan Van Summeren	Belgium	Davitamon–Lotto	25	112
71	Floyd Landis	United States	Phonak	30	DSQ
72	Bert Grabsch	Germany	Phonak	31	107
73	Robert Hunter	South Africa	Phonak	29	DNF
74	Nicolas Jalabert	France	Phonak	33	103
75	Martin Perdiguero	Spain	Phonak	33	DNF
76	Axel Merckx	Belgium	Phonak	33	31
77	Koos Moerenhout	Netherlands	Phonak	32	62
78	Alexandre Moos	Switzerland	Phonak	33	97
79	Víctor Hugo Peña	Colombia	Phonak	31	122
81	Damiano Cunego	Italy	Lampre–Fondital	24	12
82	Alessandro Ballan	Italy	Lampre–Fondital	26	67
83	Daniele Bennati	Italy	Lampre–Fondital	25	DNF
84	Marzio Bruseghin	Italy	Lampre–Fondital	32	20
85	Salvatore Commesso	Italy	Lampre–Fondital	31	57
86	Daniele Righi	Italy	Lampre–Fondital	30	109
87	Paolo Tiralongo	Italy	Lampre–Fondital	28	70
88	Tadej Valjavec	Slovenia	Lampre–Fondital	29	17
89	Patxi Vila Errandonea	Spain	Lampre–Fondital	30	22
91	Alejandro Valverde	Spain	Caisse d'Epargne–Illes Balears	26	DNF
92	David Arroyo	Spain	Caisse d'Epargne–Illes Balears	26	21
93	Florent Brard	France	Caisse d'Epargne–Illes Balears	30	DNF
94	Isaac Gálvez	Spain	Caisse d'Epargne–Illes Balears	31	DNF
95	José Garcia	Spain	Caisse d'Epargne–Illes Balears	33	115
96	Vladimir Karpets	Russia	Caisse d'Epargne–Illes Balears	25	30
97	Óscar Pereiro	Spain	Caisse d'Epargne–Illes Balears	28	2nd (awarded 1st)
98	Nicolas Portal	France	Caisse d'Epargne–Illes Balears	27	100
99	Xabier Zandio	Spain	Caisse d'Epargne–Illes Balears	29	33
101	Tom Boonen	Belgium	Quick-Step–Innergetic	25	DNF
102	Wilfried Cretskens	Belgium	Quick-Step–Innergetic	30	DNF
103	Steven de Jongh	Netherlands	Quick-Step–Innergetic	28	DNF
104	Juan Manuel Gárate	Spain	Quick-Step–Innergetic	30	72
105	Filippo Pozzato	Italy	Quick-Step–Innergetic	24	133
106	José Rujano	Venezuela	Quick-Step–Innergetic	24	DNF
107	Bram Tankink	Netherlands	Quick-Step–Innergetic	27	94
108	Matteo Tosatto	Italy	Quick-Step–Innergetic	32	125
109	Cédric Vasseur	France	Quick-Step–Innergetic	35	95
111	Pietro Caucchioli	Italy	Crédit Agricole	30	16
112	Alexander Botcharov	Russia	Crédit Agricole	31	49
113	Anthony Charteau	France	Crédit Agricole	27	114
114	Julian Dean	New Zealand	Crédit Agricole	31	128
115	Jimmy Engoulvent	France	Crédit Agricole	26	DNF
116	Patrice Halgand	France	Crédit Agricole	32	48
117	Sébastien Hinault	France	Crédit Agricole	32	113
118	Thor Hushovd	Norway	Crédit Agricole	28	121
119	Christophe Le Mével	France	Crédit Agricole	25	76
121	Iban Mayo	Spain	Euskaltel–Euskadi	28	DNF
122	Iker Camaño	Spain	Euskaltel–Euskadi	27	35
123	Unai Etxebarría	Venezuela	Euskaltel–Euskadi	33	127
124	Aitor Hernández	Spain	Euskaltel–Euskadi	24	136
125	Iñaki Isasi	Spain	Euskaltel–Euskadi	29	71
126	Íñigo Landaluze	Spain	Euskaltel–Euskadi	29	50
127	David López	Spain	Euskaltel–Euskadi	25	DNF
128	Gorka Verdugo	Spain	Euskaltel–Euskadi	27	75
129	Haimar Zubeldia	Spain	Euskaltel–Euskadi	29	9
131	David Moncoutié	France	Cofidis	31	58
132	Stéphane Augé	France	Cofidis	31	123
133	Jimmy Casper	France	Cofidis	28	138
134	Sylvain Chavanel	France	Cofidis	27	45
135	Arnaud Coyot	France	Cofidis	24	130
136	Cristian Moreni	Italy	Cofidis	33	44
137	Iván Parra	Colombia	Cofidis	30	43
138	Rik Verbrugghe	Belgium	Cofidis	31	DNF
139	Bradley Wiggins	Great Britain	Cofidis	26	124
141	Gilberto Simoni	Italy	Saunier Duval–Prodir	34	60
142	David Cañada	Spain	Saunier Duval–Prodir	31	DNF
143	David de la Fuente	Spain	Saunier Duval–Prodir	25	56
144	José Gómez Marchante	Spain	Saunier Duval–Prodir	26	DNF
145	Rubén Lobato	Spain	Saunier Duval–Prodir	27	46
146	David Millar	Great Britain	Saunier Duval–Prodir	29	59
147	Riccardo Riccò	Italy	Saunier Duval–Prodir	22	98
148	Christophe Rinero	France	Saunier Duval–Prodir	32	41
149	Francisco Ventoso	Spain	Saunier Duval–Prodir	24	78
151	Sandy Casar	France	Française des Jeux	27	69
152	Carlos Da Cruz	France	Française des Jeux	31	77
153	Bernhard Eisel	Austria	Française des Jeux	25	108
154	Philippe Gilbert	Belgium	Française des Jeux	23	110
155	Sébastien Joly	France	Française des Jeux	27	DNF
156	Gustav Larsson	Sweden	Française des Jeux	25	105
157	Thomas Lövkvist	Sweden	Française des Jeux	22	63
158	Christophe Mengin	France	Française des Jeux	37	131
159	Benoît Vaugrenard	France	Française des Jeux	24	87
161	Danilo Di Luca	Italy	Liquigas	30	DNF
162	Michael Albasini	Switzerland	Liquigas	25	118
163	Magnus Bäckstedt	Sweden	Liquigas	31	DNF
164	Patrick Calcagni	Switzerland	Liquigas	28	129
165	Kjell Carlström	Finland	Liquigas	29	132
166	Stefano Garzelli	Italy	Liquigas	33	55
167	Matej Mugerli	Slovenia	Liquigas	25	119
168	Luca Paolini	Italy	Liquigas	29	101
169	Manuel Quinziato	Italy	Liquigas	26	80
171	Thomas Voeckler	France	Bouygues Télécom	27	89
172	Walter Bénéteau	France	Bouygues Télécom	33	111
173	Laurent Brochard	France	Bouygues Télécom	38	DNF
174	Pierrick Fédrigo	France	Bouygues Télécom	27	29
175	Anthony Geslin	France	Bouygues Télécom	26	88
176	Laurent Lefèvre	France	Bouygues Télécom	29	38
177	Jérôme Pineau	France	Bouygues Télécom	26	83
178	Didier Rous	France	Bouygues Télécom	35	73
179	Matthieu Sprick	France	Bouygues Télécom	24	51
181	Erik Zabel	Germany	Team Milram	35	86
182	Mirko Celestino	Italy	Team Milram	32	DNF
183	Ralf Grabsch	Germany	Team Milram	33	102
184	Andriy Hrivko	Ukraine	Team Milram	22	DNF
185	Maxim Iglinsky	Kazakhstan	Team Milram	25	DNF
186	Christian Knees	Germany	Team Milram	25	104
187	Fabio Sacchi	Italy	Team Milram	32	DNF
188	Björn Schröder	Germany	Team Milram	25	81
189	Marco Velo	Italy	Team Milram	32	99
191	Juan Miguel Mercado	Spain	Agritubel	27	DNF
192	Manuel Calvente	Spain	Agritubel	29	90
193	Cédric Coutouly	France	Agritubel	26	134
194	Moisés Dueñas	Spain	Agritubel	25	61
195	Eduardo Gonzalo	Spain	Agritubel	22	117
196	Christophe Laurent	France	Agritubel	28	126
197	José Alberto Martínez	Spain	Agritubel	29	DNF
198	Samuel Plouhinec	France	Agritubel	30	DNF
199	Benoît Salmon	France	Agritubel	32	39

== Cyclists by team ==
Discovery Channel United States DSC
Nr.		Age		Pos.
1	José Azevedo	32	Portugal	19th
2	Viatcheslav Ekimov	40	Russia	84th
3	George Hincapie	33	USA	32nd
4	Egoi Martínez	28	Spain	42nd
5	Benjamín Noval	27	Spain	DNF
6	Pavel Padrnos	35	Czech Republic	65th
7	Yaroslav Popovych	26	Ukraine	25th
8	José Luis Rubiera	33	Spain	92nd
9	Paolo Savoldelli	33	Italy	DNF
Team manager: Johan Bruyneel

Team CSC Denmark CSC
Nr.		Age		Pos.
11	Bobby Julich	34	USA	DNF
12	Giovanni Lombardi	37	Italy	DNF
13	Stuart O'Grady	32	Australia	91st
14	Carlos Sastre	31	Spain	4th
15	Fränk Schleck	26	Luxembourg	11th
16	Christian Vande Velde	30	USA	24th
17	Jens Voigt	34	Germany	53rd
18	David Zabriskie	27	USA	74th
Team manager: Bjarne Riis

T-Mobile Team Germany TMO
Nr.		Age		Pos.
21	Andreas Klöden	30	Germany	3rd
22	Giuseppe Guerini	36	Italy	26th
23	Serhiy Honchar	35	Ukraine	52nd
24	Matthias Kessler	27	Germany	54th
25	Eddy Mazzoleni	32	Italy	27th
26	Michael Rogers	26	Australia	10th
27	Patrik Sinkewitz	25	Germany	23rd
Team manager: Olaf Ludwig

AG2R Prévoyance France A2R
Nr.		Age		Pos.
31	Christophe Moreau	35	France	8th
32	José Luis Arrieta	35	Spain	28th
33	Mikel Astarloza	26	Spain	36th
34	Sylvain Calzati	27	France	34th
35	Cyril Dessel	31	France	7th
36	Samuel Dumoulin	25	France	120th
37	Simon Gerrans	26	Australia	79th
38	Stéphane Goubert	36	France	37th
Team manager: Vincent Lavenu

Gerolsteiner Germany GST
Nr.		Age		Pos.
41	Levi Leipheimer	32	USA	13th
42	Markus Fothen	24	Germany	15th
43	David Kopp	27	Germany	DNF
44	Sebastian Lang	26	Germany	66th
45	Ronny Scholz	28	Germany	96th
46	Georg Totschnig	35	Austria	47th
47	Fabian Wegmann	26	Germany	68th
48	Peter Wrolich	32	Austria	135th
49	Beat Zberg	35	Switzerland	DNF
Team manager: Renate Holczer

Rabobank Netherlands RAB
Nr.		Age		Pos.
51	Denis Menchov	28	Russia	6th
52	Michael Boogerd	34	Netherlands	14th
53	Bram de Groot	31	Netherlands	DNF
54	Erik Dekker	35	Netherlands	DNF
55	Juan Antonio Flecha	28	Spain	82nd
56	Óscar Freire	30	Spain	DNF
57	Joost Posthuma	25	Netherlands	85th
58	Michael Rasmussen	32	Denmark	18th
59	Pieter Weening	25	Netherlands	93rd
Team managers: Theo de Rooij

Davitamon–Lotto Belgium DVL
Nr.		Age		Pos.
61	Cadel Evans	29	Australia	5th
62	Mario Aerts	31	Belgium	106th
63	Christophe Brandt	29	Belgium	40th
64	Chris Horner	34	United States	64th
65	Robbie McEwen	34	Australia	116th
66	Fred Rodriguez	32	United States	DNF
67	Gert Steegmans	25	Belgium	137th
68	Wim Vansevenant	34	Belgium	139th
69	Johan Van Summeren	25	Belgium	112th
Team manager: Geert Coeman

Phonak Switzerland PHO
Nr.		Age		Pos.
71	Floyd Landis	30	USA	DSQ
72	Bert Grabsch	31	Germany	107th
73	Robert Hunter	29	South Africa	DNF
74	Nicolas Jalabert	33	France	103rd
75	Martin Perdiguero	33	Spain	DNF
76	Axel Merckx	33	Belgium	31st
77	Koos Moerenhout	32	Netherlands	62nd
78	Alexandre Moos	33	Switzerland	97th
79	Víctor Hugo Peña	31	Colombia	122nd
Team manager: John Lelangue

Lampre–Fondital Italy LAM
Nr.		Age		Pos.
81	Damiano Cunego	24	Italy	12th
82	Alessandro Ballan	26	Italy	67th
83	Daniele Bennati	25	Italy	DNF
84	Marzio Bruseghin	32	Italy	20th
85	Salvatore Commesso	31	Italy	57th
86	Daniele Righi	30	Italy	109th
87	Paolo Tiralongo	28	Italy	70th
88	Tadej Valjavec	29	Slovenia	17th
89	Patxi Vila Errandonea	30	Spain	22nd
Team manager: Giuseppe Saronni

Caisse d'Epargne–Illes Balears Spain CEI
Nr.		Age		Pos.
91	Alejandro Valverde	26	Spain	DNF
92	David Arroyo	26	Spain	21st
93	Florent Brard	30	France	DNF
94	Isaac Gálvez	31	Spain	DNF
95	José Garcia	33	Spain	115th
96	Vladimir Karpets	25	Russia	30th
97	Óscar Pereiro	28	Spain	2nd (awarded 1st)
98	Nicolas Portal	27	France	100th
99	Xabier Zandio	29	Spain	33rd
Team manager: José Miguel Echavarri Garcia

Quick-Step–Innergetic Belgium QSI
Nr.		Age		Pos.
101	Tom Boonen	25	Belgium	DNF
102	Wilfried Cretskens	30	Belgium	DNF
103	Steven de Jongh	28	Netherlands	DNF
104	Juan Manuel Gárate	30	Spain	72nd
105	Filippo Pozzato	24	Italy	133rd
106	José Rujano	24	Venezuela	DNF
107	Bram Tankink	27	Netherlands	94th
108	Matteo Tosatto	32	Italy	125th
109	Cédric Vasseur	35	France	95th
Team manager: Patrick Lefevere

Crédit Agricole France C.A
Nr.		Age		Pos.
111	Pietro Caucchioli	30	Italy	16th
112	Alexander Botcharov	31	Russia	49th
113	Anthony Charteau	27	France	114th
114	Julian Dean	31	New Zealand	128th
115	Jimmy Engoulvent	26	France	DNF
116	Patrice Halgand	32	France	48th
117	Sébastien Hinault	32	France	113th
118	Thor Hushovd	28	Norway	121st
119	Christophe Le Mével	25	France	76th
Team manager: Roger Legeay

Euskaltel–Euskadi Spain EUS
Nr.		Age		Pos.
121	Iban Mayo	28	Spain	DNF
122	Iker Camaño	27	Spain	35th
123	Unai Etxebarría	33	Venezuela	127th
124	Aitor Hernández	24	Spain	136th
125	Iñaki Isasi	29	Spain	71st
126	Íñigo Landaluze	29	Spain	50th
127	David López	25	Spain	DNF
128	Gorka Verdugo	27	Spain	75th
129	Haimar Zubeldia	29	Spain	9th
Team manager: Miguel Madaragia

Cofidis France COF
Nr.		Age		Pos.
131	David Moncoutié	31	France	58th
132	Stéphane Augé	31	France	123rd
133	Jimmy Casper	28	France	138th
134	Sylvain Chavanel	27	France	45th
135	Arnaud Coyot	24	France	130th
136	Cristian Moreni	33	Italy	44th
137	Iván Parra	30	Colombia	43rd
138	Rik Verbrugghe	31	Belgium	DNF
139	Bradley Wiggins	26	United Kingdom	124th
Team manager: Éric Boyer

Saunier Duval–Prodir Spain SDV
Nr.		Age		Pos.
141	Gilberto Simoni	34	Italy	60th
142	David Cañada	31	Spain	DNF
143	David de la Fuente	25	Spain	56th
144	José Gómez Marchante	26	Spain	DNF
145	Rubén Lobato	27	Spain	46th
146	David Millar	29	United Kingdom	59th
147	Riccardo Riccò	22	Italy	98th
148	Christophe Rinero	32	France	41st
149	Francisco Ventoso	24	Spain	78th
Team manager: Mauro Gianetti

Française des Jeux France FDJ
Nr.		Age		Pos.
151	Sandy Casar	27	France	69th
152	Carlos Da Cruz	31	France	77th
153	Bernhard Eisel	25	Austria	108th
154	Philippe Gilbert	23	Belgium	110th
155	Sébastien Joly	27	France	DNF
156	Gustav Larsson	25	Sweden	105th
157	Thomas Lövkvist	22	Sweden	63rd
158	Christophe Mengin	37	France	131st
159	Benoît Vaugrenard	24	France	87th
Team manager: Marc Madiot

Liquigas Italy LIQ
Nr.		Age		Pos.
161	Danilo Di Luca	30	Italy	DNF
162	Michael Albasini	25	Switzerland	118th
163	Magnus Bäckstedt	31	Sweden	DNF
164	Patrick Calcagni	28	Switzerland	129th
165	Kjell Carlström	29	Finland	132nd
166	Stefano Garzelli	33	Italy	55th
167	Matej Mugerli	25	Slovenia	119th
168	Luca Paolini	29	Italy	101st
169	Manuel Quinziato	26	Italy	80th
Team manager: Roberto Amadio

Bouygues Télécom France BTL
Nr.		Age		Pos.
171	Thomas Voeckler	27	France	89th
172	Walter Bénéteau	33	France	111th
173	Laurent Brochard	38	France	DNF
174	Pierrick Fédrigo	27	France	29th
175	Anthony Geslin	26	France	88th
176	Laurent Lefèvre	29	France	38th
177	Jérôme Pineau	26	France	83rd
178	Didier Rous	35	France	73rd
179	Matthieu Sprick	24	France	51st
Team manager: Jean-René Bernaudeau

Team Milram Italy MRM
Nr.		Age		Pos.
181	Erik Zabel	35	Germany	86th
182	Mirko Celestino	32	Italy	DNF
183	Ralf Grabsch	33	Germany	102nd
184	Andriy Hrivko	22	Ukraine	DNF
185	Maxim Iglinsky	25	Kazakhstan	DNF
186	Christian Knees	25	Germany	104th
187	Fabio Sacchi	32	Italy	DNF
188	Björn Schröder	25	Germany	81st
189	Marco Velo	32	Italy	99th
Team manager: Gianluigi Stanga

Agritubel France AGR
Nr.		Age		Pos.
191	Juan Miguel Mercado	27	Spain	DNF
192	Manuel Calvente	29	Spain	90th
193	Cédric Coutouly	26	France	134th
194	Moisés Dueñas	25	Spain	61st
195	Eduardo Gonzalo	22	Spain	117th
196	Christophe Laurent	28	France	126th
197	José Alberto Martínez	29	Spain	DNF
198	Samuel Plouhinec	30	France	DNF
199	Benoît Salmon	32	France	39th
Team manager: David Fornes

== Teams ==
Discovery Channel (United States) DSC
Nr.		Age		Pos.
1	José Azevedo	32	(Portugal)	19th
2	Viatcheslav Ekimov	40	(Russia)	84th
3	George Hincapie	33	(United States)	32nd
4	Egoi Martínez	28	(Spain)	42nd
5	Benjamín Noval	27	(Spain)	DNF
6	Pavel Padrnos	35	(Czech Republic)	65th
7	Yaroslav Popovych	26	(Ukraine)	25th
8	José Luis Rubiera	33	(Spain)	92nd
9	Paolo Savoldelli	33	(Italy)	DNF
Team manager: Johan Bruyneel

Team CSC (Denmark) CSC
Nr.		Age		Pos.
11	Bobby Julich	34	(United States)	DNF
12	Giovanni Lombardi	37	(Italy)	DNF
13	Stuart O'Grady	32	(Australia)	91st
14	Carlos Sastre	31	(Spain)	4th
15	Fränk Schleck	26	(Luxembourg)	11th
16	Christian Vande Velde	30	(United States)	24th
17	Jens Voigt	34	(Germany)	53rd
18	David Zabriskie	27	(United States)	74th
Team manager: Bjarne Riis

T-Mobile Team (Germany) TMO
Nr.		Age		Pos.
21	Andreas Klöden	30	(Germany)	3rd
22	Giuseppe Guerini	36	(Italy)	26th
23	Serhiy Honchar	35	(Ukraine)	52nd
24	Matthias Kessler	27	(Germany)	54th
25	Eddy Mazzoleni	32	(Italy)	27th
26	Michael Rogers	26	(Australia)	10th
27	Patrik Sinkewitz	25	(Germany)	23rd
Team manager: Olaf Ludwig

AG2R Prévoyance (France) A2R
Nr.		Age		Pos.
31	Christophe Moreau	35	(France)	8th
32	José Luis Arrieta	35	(Spain)	28th
33	Mikel Astarloza	26	(Spain)	36th
34	Sylvain Calzati	27	(France)	34th
35	Cyril Dessel	31	(France)	7th
36	Samuel Dumoulin	25	(France)	120th
37	Simon Gerrans	26	(Australia)	79th
38	Stéphane Goubert	36	(France)	37th
Team manager: Vincent Lavenu

Gerolsteiner (Germany) GST
Nr.		Age		Pos.
41	Levi Leipheimer	32	(United States)	13th
42	Markus Fothen	24	(Germany)	15th
43	David Kopp	27	(Germany)	DNF
44	Sebastian Lang	26	(Germany)	66th
45	Ronny Scholz	28	(Germany)	96th
46	Georg Totschnig	35	(Austria)	47th
47	Fabian Wegmann	26	(Germany)	68th
48	Peter Wrolich	32	(Austria)	135th
49	Beat Zberg	35	(Switzerland)	DNF
Team manager: Renate Holczer

Rabobank (Netherlands) RAB
Nr.		Age		Pos.
51	Denis Menchov	28	(Russia)	6th
52	Michael Boogerd	34	(Netherlands)	14th
53	Bram de Groot	31	(Netherlands)	DNF
54	Erik Dekker	35	(Netherlands)	DNF
55	Juan Antonio Flecha	28	(Spain)	82nd
56	Óscar Freire	30	(Spain)	DNF
57	Joost Posthuma	25	(Netherlands)	85th
58	Michael Rasmussen	32	(Denmark)	18th
59	Pieter Weening	25	(Netherlands)	93rd
Team managers: Theo de Rooij

Davitamon–Lotto (Belgium) DVL
Nr.		Age		Pos.
61	Cadel Evans	29	(Australia)	5th
62	Mario Aerts	31	(Belgium)	106th
63	Christophe Brandt	29	(Belgium)	40th
64	Chris Horner	34	(United States)	64th
65	Robbie McEwen	34	(Australia)	116th
66	Fred Rodriguez	32	(United States)	DNF
67	Gert Steegmans	25	(Belgium)	137th
68	Wim Vansevenant	34	(Belgium)	139th
69	Johan Van Summeren	25	(Belgium)	112th
Team manager: Geert Coeman

Phonak (Switzerland) PHO
Nr.		Age		Pos.
71	Floyd Landis	30	(United States)	DSQ
72	Bert Grabsch	31	(Germany)	107th
73	Robert Hunter	29	(South Africa)	DNF
74	Nicolas Jalabert	33	(France)	103rd
75	Martin Perdiguero	33	(Spain)	DNF
76	Axel Merckx	33	(Belgium)	31st
77	Koos Moerenhout	32	(Netherlands)	62nd
78	Alexandre Moos	33	(Switzerland)	97th
79	Víctor Hugo Peña	31	(Colombia)	122nd
Team manager: John Lelangue

Lampre–Fondital (Italy) LAM
Nr.		Age		Pos.
81	Damiano Cunego	24	(Italy)	12th
82	Alessandro Ballan	26	(Italy)	67th
83	Daniele Bennati	25	(Italy)	DNF
84	Marzio Bruseghin	32	(Italy)	20th
85	Salvatore Commesso	31	(Italy)	57th
86	Daniele Righi	30	(Italy)	109th
87	Paolo Tiralongo	28	(Italy)	70th
88	Tadej Valjavec	29	(Slovenia)	17th
89	Patxi Vila Errandonea	30	(Spain)	22nd
Team manager: Giuseppe Saronni

Caisse d'Epargne–Illes Balears (Spain) CEI
Nr.		Age		Pos.
91	Alejandro Valverde	26	(Spain)	DNF
92	David Arroyo	26	(Spain)	21st
93	Florent Brard	30	(France)	DNF
94	Isaac Gálvez	31	(Spain)	DNF
95	José Garcia	33	(Spain)	115th
96	Vladimir Karpets	25	(Russia)	30th
97	Óscar Pereiro	28	(Spain)	2nd (awarded 1st)
98	Nicolas Portal	27	(France)	100th
99	Xabier Zandio	29	(Spain)	33rd
Team manager: José Miguel Echavarri Garcia

Quick-Step–Innergetic (Belgium) QSI
Nr.		Age		Pos.
101	Tom Boonen	25	(Belgium)	DNF
102	Wilfried Cretskens	30	(Belgium)	DNF
103	Steven de Jongh	28	(Netherlands)	DNF
104	Juan Manuel Gárate	30	(Spain)	72nd
105	Filippo Pozzato	24	(Italy)	133rd
106	José Rujano	24	(Venezuela)	DNF
107	Bram Tankink	27	(Netherlands)	94th
108	Matteo Tosatto	32	(Italy)	125th
109	Cédric Vasseur	35	(France)	95th
Team manager: Patrick Lefevere

Crédit Agricole (France) C.A
Nr.		Age		Pos.
111	Pietro Caucchioli	30	(Italy)	16th
112	Alexander Botcharov	31	(Russia)	49th
113	Anthony Charteau	27	(France)	114th
114	Julian Dean	31	(New Zealand)	128th
115	Jimmy Engoulvent	26	(France)	DNF
116	Patrice Halgand	32	(France)	48th
117	Sébastien Hinault	32	(France)	113th
118	Thor Hushovd	28	(Norway)	121st
119	Christophe Le Mével	25	(France)	76th
Team manager: Roger Legeay

Euskaltel–Euskadi (Spain) EUS
Nr.		Age		Pos.
121	Iban Mayo	28	(Spain)	DNF
122	Iker Camaño	27	(Spain)	35th
123	Unai Etxebarría	33	(Venezuela)	127th
124	Aitor Hernández	24	(Spain)	136th
125	Iñaki Isasi	29	(Spain)	71st
126	Íñigo Landaluze	29	(Spain)	50th
127	David López	25	(Spain)	DNF
128	Gorka Verdugo	27	(Spain)	75th
129	Haimar Zubeldia	29	(Spain)	9th
Team manager: Miguel Madaragia

Cofidis (France) COF
Nr.		Age		Pos.
131	David Moncoutié	31	(France)	58th
132	Stéphane Augé	31	(France)	123rd
133	Jimmy Casper	28	(France)	138th
134	Sylvain Chavanel	27	(France)	45th
135	Arnaud Coyot	24	(France)	130th
136	Cristian Moreni	33	(Italy)	44th
137	Iván Parra	30	(Colombia)	43rd
138	Rik Verbrugghe	31	(Belgium)	DNF
139	Bradley Wiggins	26	(United Kingdom)	124th
Team manager: Éric Boyer

Saunier Duval–Prodir (Spain) SDV
Nr.		Age		Pos.
141	Gilberto Simoni	34	(Italy)	60th
142	David Cañada	31	(Spain)	DNF
143	David de la Fuente	25	(Spain)	56th
144	José Gómez Marchante	26	(Spain)	DNF
145	Rubén Lobato	27	(Spain)	46th
146	David Millar	29	(United Kingdom)	59th
147	Riccardo Riccò	22	(Italy)	98th
148	Christophe Rinero	32	(France)	41st
149	Francisco Ventoso	24	(Spain)	78th
Team manager: Mauro Gianetti

Française des Jeux (France) FDJ
Nr.		Age		Pos.
151	Sandy Casar	27	(France)	69th
152	Carlos Da Cruz	31	(France)	77th
153	Bernhard Eisel	25	(Austria)	108th
154	Philippe Gilbert	23	(Belgium)	110th
155	Sébastien Joly	27	(France)	DNF
156	Gustav Larsson	25	(Sweden)	105th
157	Thomas Lövkvist	22	(Sweden)	63rd
158	Christophe Mengin	37	(France)	131st
159	Benoît Vaugrenard	24	(France)	87th
Team manager: Marc Madiot

Liquigas (Italy) LIQ
Nr.		Age		Pos.
161	Danilo Di Luca	30	(Italy)	DNF
162	Michael Albasini	25	(Switzerland)	118th
163	Magnus Bäckstedt	31	(Sweden)	DNF
164	Patrick Calcagni	28	(Switzerland)	129th
165	Kjell Carlström	29	(Finland)	132nd
166	Stefano Garzelli	33	(Italy)	55th
167	Matej Mugerli	25	(Slovenia)	119th
168	Luca Paolini	29	(Italy)	101st
169	Manuel Quinziato	26	(Italy)	80th
Team manager: Roberto Amadio

Bouygues Télécom (France) BTL
Nr.		Age		Pos.
171	Thomas Voeckler	27	(France)	89th
172	Walter Bénéteau	33	(France)	111th
173	Laurent Brochard	38	(France)	DNF
174	Pierrick Fédrigo	27	(France)	29th
175	Anthony Geslin	26	(France)	88th
176	Laurent Lefèvre	29	(France)	38th
177	Jérôme Pineau	26	(France)	83rd
178	Didier Rous	35	(France)	73rd
179	Matthieu Sprick	24	(France)	51st
Team manager: Jean-René Bernaudeau

Team Milram (Italy) MRM
Nr.		Age		Pos.
181	Erik Zabel	35	(Germany)	86th
182	Mirko Celestino	32	(Italy)	DNF
183	Ralf Grabsch	33	(Germany)	102nd
184	Andriy Hrivko	22	(Ukraine)	DNF
185	Maxim Iglinsky	25	(Kazakhstan)	DNF
186	Christian Knees	25	(Germany)	104th
187	Fabio Sacchi	32	(Italy)	DNF
188	Björn Schröder	25	(Germany)	81st
189	Marco Velo	32	(Italy)	99th
Team manager: Gianluigi Stanga

Agritubel (France) AGR
Nr.		Age		Pos.
191	Juan Miguel Mercado	27	(Spain)	DNF
192	Manuel Calvente	29	(Spain)	90th
193	Cédric Coutouly	26	(France)	134th
194	Moisés Dueñas	25	(Spain)	61st
195	Eduardo Gonzalo	22	(Spain)	117th
196	Christophe Laurent	28	(France)	126th
197	José Alberto Martínez	29	(Spain)	DNF
198	Samuel Plouhinec	30	(France)	DNF
199	Benoît Salmon	32	(France)	39th
Team manager: David Fornes

== Facts about the riders ==
- 26 countries were represented. France has the most riders, with 36 from the total of 176.
- Bouygues Télécom is only team with all nine riders from the same country.
- Team CSC is only team without rider from the country the team is from (Denmark)
- 31 riders who have already completed Giro: Ekimov, Padrnos, Rubiera, Savoldelli, Julich, Lombardi, Sastre, Voigt, Kessler, Calzati, Peña, Cunego, Bruseghin, Tiralongo, Valjavec, Vila Errandonea, Garate, Botcharov, Halgand, Lopez, Parra, Simoni, Lobato, Casar, da Cruz, Larsson, Di Luca, Calcagni, Lefevre, Knees, Sacchi
- 11 riders who took part in Giro but abandoned: Honchar, Rogers, Scholz, Rasmussen, Brandt, McEwen, Merckx, Rujano, Moreni, Verbrugghe, Gilbert
- Following a non-start from Jan Ullrich, it is the first time since 1999 that the race has not included a former Tour de France winner.
- Five riders have won Grand Tour: Garzelli (Giro 2000), Simoni (Giro 2001 and 2003), Savoldelli (Giro 2002 and 2005), Cunego (Giro 2004) and Menchov (Vuelta 2005)
- Three riders have won points competition in Tour de France: Zabel (1996 to 2001), McEwen (2002 and 2004) and Hushovd (2005)
- Two riders have won mountains classification in Tour de France: Rinero (1998) and Rasmussen (2005)
- Four riders have won under-25 classification in Tour de France: Salmon (1999), Menchov (2003), Karpets (2004) and Popovych (2005)
- Eleven riders had led the general classification: Vasseur, Zabel, O'Grady, Millar, Moreau, Voigt, Peña, Hushovd, McEwen, Voeckler and Zabriskie.
- Riders who lead the general classification for the first time during the 2006 Tour: Hincapie, Boonen, Honchar, Dessel, Landis and Pereiro.
- At the start, riders who had won a stage in Tour de France: Ekimov, Zabel, Boogerd, Vasseur, Brochard, Mengin, Rous, O'Grady, Bäckstedt, Guerini, Commesso, McEwen, Millar, Dekker, Moreau, Verbrugghe, Voigt, Freire, Halgand, Hushovd, Mayo, Flecha, Sastre, Simoni, Boonen, Pozzato, Moncoutié, Mercado, Zabriskie, Weening, Rasmussen, Valverde, Totschnig, Hincapie, Pereiro and Savoldelli.
- New stage winners during the Tour: Casper, Kessler, Honchar, Calzati, Menchov, Popovych, Fedrigo, Schleck, and Landis. (Note: Popovych was part of the Discovery Channel team that won the time trial stage in the 2005 Tour de France. However it's his first individual stage victory. There are other riders as well who have been part of winning team in TTT but haven't won an individual stage)

== See also ==
- 2006 Tour de France
- List of teams and cyclists in the 2005 Tour de France
