= Eduardo Gonzalo =

Spanish cyclist

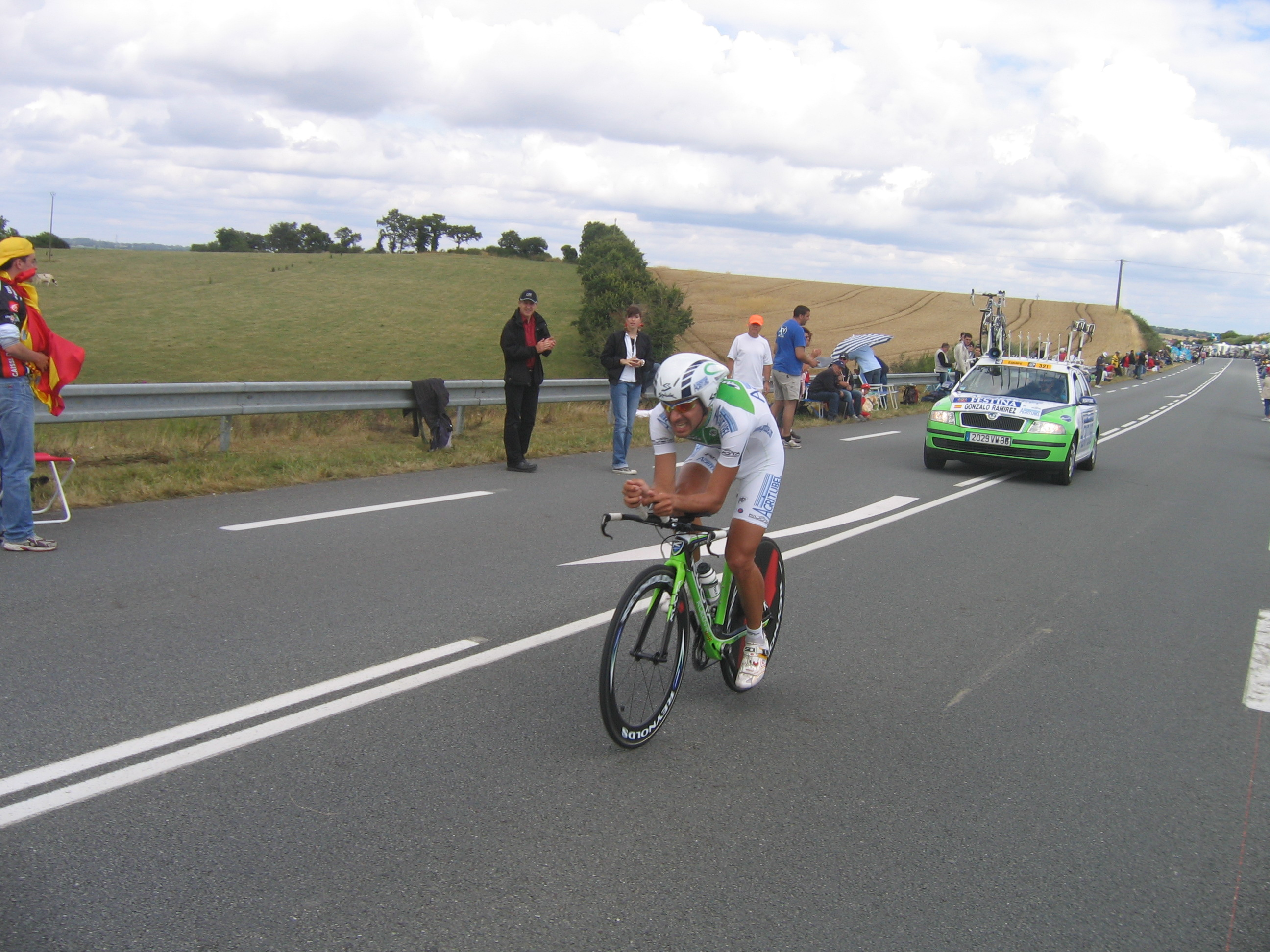
- Gonzalo in 2008.

Personal information
- Full name: Eduardo Gonzalo Ramírez
- Born: 25 August 1983 (age 43) Mataro, Spain

Cycling career
- Sport: Cycling
- Discipline: Road
- Role: Rider
- Rider type: Climber

Amateur teams
- 2003: Angel Mir–Cataluna
- 2005: FC Barcelona

Professional teams
- 2006–2009: Agritubel
- 2010: Bretagne–Schuller
- 2011: La Pomme Marseille

Eduardo Gonzalo Ramírez (born 25 August 1983 in Mataro) is a Spanish former road racing cyclist, who competed professionally between 2006 and 2011 for the Agritubel, Bretagne–Schuller and La Pomme Marseille teams.

In 2005, he won the overall rankings of the under-23 Tour de l'Isard d'Ariège. A year later he signed his first professional contract when he joined Agritubel. He won two stages in minor races in 2006 and made his Tour de France debut that same year finishing in 117th position. In 2007 he made his second Tour appearance, but was forced to withdraw after stage one due to a collarbone injury. Early in the stage he crashed into the back windscreen of a Caisse d'Epargne team car.

== Major results ==
2005
1st Overall Ronde de l'Isard

1st Mountains classification

4th Overall Giro delle Regioni
2006
2nd Overall Rhône-Alpes Isère Tour

1st Stage 3

3rd Overall Circuit de Lorraine

1st Stage 3

9th Classic Loire Atlantique
2007
1st Mountains classification Les 3 Jours de Vaucluse
3rd Overall Circuit de Lorraine
9th Overall Clásica Internacional de Alcobendas
2008
6th Overall Tour Méditerranéen
2009
7th Overall Route du Sud
7th GP Triberg-Schwarzwald
2010
7th Overall Circuit de Lorraine
8th Tour du Finistère
10th Overall Circuit des Ardennes
10th Les Boucles du Sud Ardèche
