= Nicolas Vogondy =

French cyclist

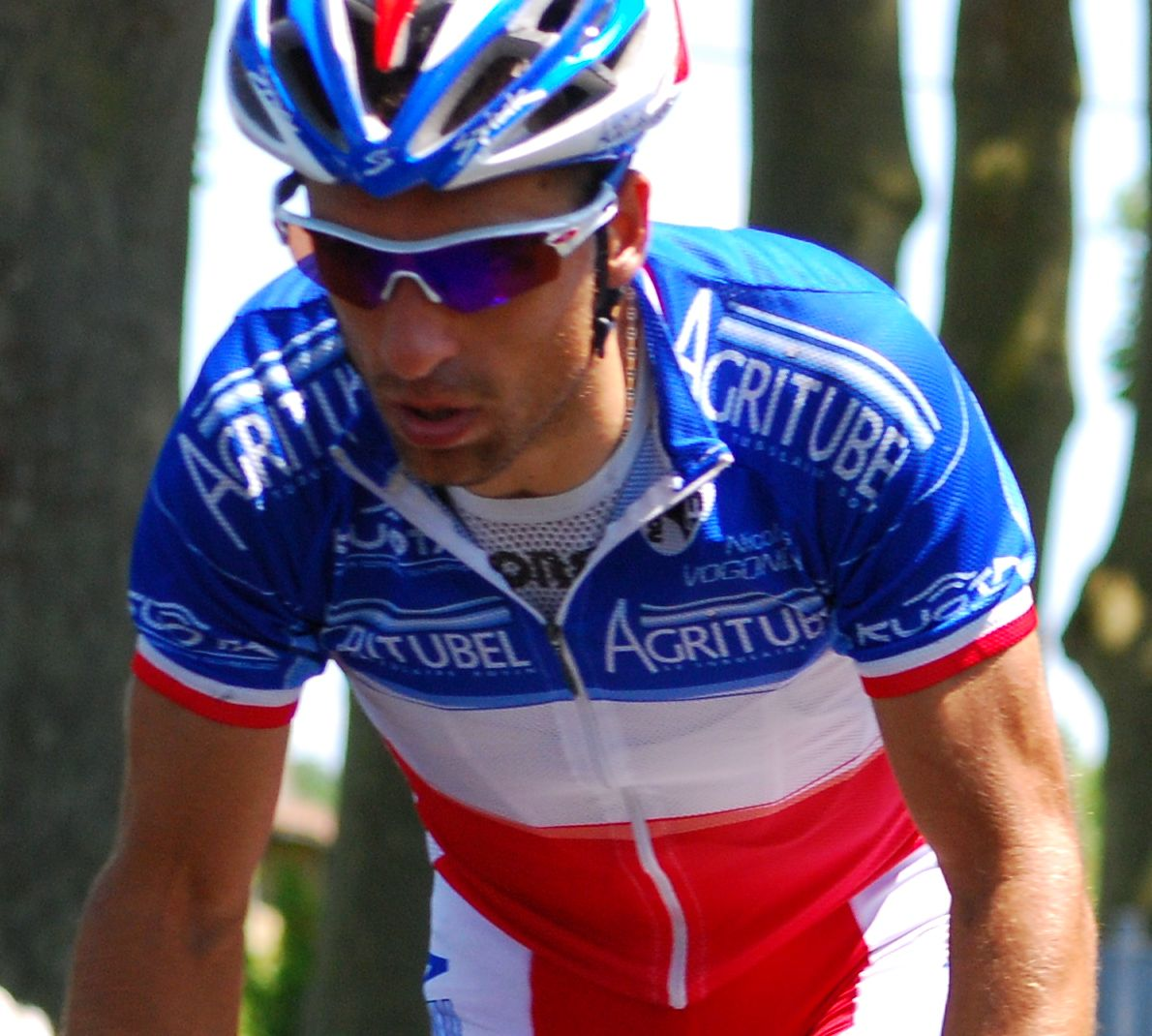

Personal information
- Full name: Nicolas Vogondy
- Born: 8 August 1977 (age 49) Blois, France

Cycling career
- Sport: Cycling
- Current team: Retired
- Discipline: Road
- Role: Rider
- Rider type: All-rounder

Professional teams
- 1997–2004: Française des Jeux
- 2005–2006: Crédit Agricole
- 2007–2009: Agritubel
- 2010: Bbox Bouygues Telecom
- 2011–2012: Cofidis
- 2013: Accent Jobs–Wanty

Nicolas Vogondy (born 8 August 1977) is a French former professional road racing cyclist, who competed as a professional between 1997 and 2013.

== Career ==
Born in Blois, Vogondy won the Tour de Lorraine in 1995 as a junior. He became a professional rider in 1997 when he signed for Française des Jeux. His first professional win came in that same year when he won the third stage of the Tour de Normandie. In 2002 he became national champion of France when he outsprinted Nicolas Jalabert and Patrice Halgand. He won the overall rankings of the Boucles de la Mayenne in 2007, after winning the second stage earlier. He has multiple appearances in the three Grand Tours, the Tour de France, the Giro d'Italia and the Vuelta a España.

Vogondy was in the breakaway on stage 5 of 2008 Tour de France. He attacked his two companions just over a kilometer before the finish, as they were about to be caught by the peloton. Vogondy stayed ahead of the pack until about 70 meters before the finish, when he was passed by top sprinters like Mark Cavendish, who won the stage.

Early in the 2010 season, Vogondy was refused a licence to race by the French cycling federation because a medical examination revealed cardiac arrhythmia problems. He was instructed to take several weeks rest pending further tests, but resumed training the following month, and started racing again in April of the same year.

After seventeen years as a professional, Vogondy retired at the end of the 2013 season.

== Major results ==
1995
1st, Tour de Lorraine (junior)
1997
1st, Stage 3, Tour de Normandie
1999
1st, Stage 4, Circuit des Mines
2002
1st, Stage 6, Circuit des Mines
1st, Criterium Polynormand
1st, National Road Race Championships
1st, Bol d'Or des Monédières Chaumeil
1st, Criterium Saran
2003
1st, A Travers le Morbihan
1st, Stage 3, Tour du Limousin
2004
1st, Stage 5, Regio-Tour International
2005
1st, Stage 1, Route du Sud
2006
1st, Châteauroux-Classic de l'Indre
1st, Stage 5, Tour du Poitou
2007
1st, Stage 2, Rhône-Alpes Isère Tour
1st, Stage 2, Boucles de la Mayenne
1st, overall, Boucles de la Mayenne
2008
1st, Stage 1 & Overall, Les 3 Jours de Vaucluse
1st, National Road Race Championships
Combative rider for Stages 5 and 21 of the Tour de France
2010
6th Overall, Critérium du Dauphiné

1st, Stage 4

1st, French National Time Trial Championships
2011
6th, Tour du Finistère
6th Overall, Circuit de la Sarthe
