= Agritubel =

French road race cycling team

Team information
- UCI code: AGR
- Registered: France
- Founded: 2005
- Disbanded: 2009
- Discipline: Road
- Status: Professional Continental

Key personnel
- General manager: David Fornes

Team name history
- 2005–2009: Agritubel

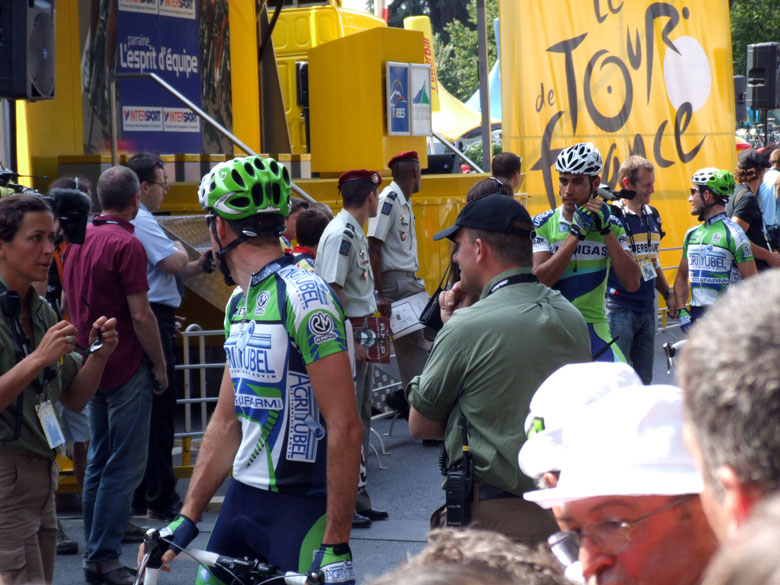
Agritubel riders making preparations at the 2006 Tour de France

Agritubel Pro Cycling Team (UCI team code: AGR) was a French professional road race cycling team. The team's title sponsor, Agritubel, is a manufacturer and supplier of tubular metal products for cattle, livestock and farming.

Agritubel mostly competed for wins at the UCI Europe Tour; however, the team was selected as one of two wildcard teams (that is, teams not on the UCI ProTour) to compete at the 2006, 2007, 2008, and 2009 Tour de France. In 2006, Agritubel riders had competed at several other UCI ProTour events, including Paris–Nice, Paris–Roubaix, La Flèche Wallonne, Liège–Bastogne–Liège, and Critérium du Dauphiné Libéré

== 2009 Team roster ==
As of July 26, 2009.

Rider	Date of birth
Emilien Benoit Berges (FRA)	January 13, 1983 (aged 26)
Freddy Bichot (FRA)	September 9, 1979 (aged 29)
Maxime Bouet (FRA)	November 3, 1986 (aged 22)
Steven Caethoven (BEL)	May 9, 1981 (aged 28)
Sylvain Calzati (FRA)	July 1, 1979 (aged 30)
Remy Cusin (FRA)	February 3, 1986 (aged 23)
Eduardo Gonzalo (ESP)	August 25, 1983 (aged 25)
Yann Huguet (FRA)	May 2, 1984 (aged 25)

Rider	Date of birth
Kevin Ista (BEL)	November 25, 1984 (aged 24)
Nicolas Jalabert (FRA)	April 13, 1973 (aged 36)
Christophe Laurent (FRA)	July 26, 1977 (aged 32)
Yoann Le Boulanger (FRA)	November 4, 1975 (aged 33)
David Lelay (FRA)	December 30, 1979 (aged 29)
Geoffroy Lequatre (FRA)	June 30, 1981 (aged 28)
Christophe Moreau (FRA)	April 12, 1971 (aged 38)
Anthony Ravard (FRA)	September 28, 1983 (aged 25)
Nicolas Vogondy (FRA)	August 8, 1977 (aged 31)

== Major wins ==
2005
Trophée Luc Leblanc, Florent Brard
Paris–Troyes, Florent Brard
Classic Loire Atlantique, José Alberto Martínez
La Roue Tourangelle, Gilles Canouet
Stage 2b Circuit de la Sarthe, Florent Brard
Stage 4 Circuit de Lorraine, Saulius Ruskys
Tour du Poitou Charentes, Christophe Agnolutto
Tour du Poitou Charentes, Linas Balčiūnas
2006
Stage 3 Critérium International, José Alberto Martínez
Stage 3 Rhône-Alpes Isère Tour, Eduardo Gonzalo
Stage 3 Circuit de Lorraine, Eduardo Gonzalo
Overall Bayern Rundfahrt, José Alberto Martínez
Stage 1 Boucles de la Mayenne, Benoît Sinner
Stage 10 Tour de France, Juan Miguel Mercado
Overall Tour de l'Avenir, Moises Dueñas

Stage 3, Hans Dekkers
Stage 6, Moises Dueñas

2007
Stage 2 Driedaagse van West-Vlaanderen, Hans Dekkers
Classic Loire Atlantique, Nicolas Jalabert
Stage 2 Rhône-Alpes Isère Tour, Nicolas Vogondy
Tour de Vendée, Mikel Gaztañaga
Stage 1 GP Paredes Rota dos Móveis, Mikel Gaztañaga
Boucles de l'Aulne, Romain Feillu
Stage 3 Tour de Luxembourg, Romain Feillu
Overall Boucles de la Mayenne, Nicolas Vogondy

Stage 2, Nicolas Vogondy

Overall Regio Tour, Moises Dueñas

Stage 2, Moises Dueñas

Overall Tour of Britain, Romain Feillu
Paris–Bourges, Romain Feillu
2008
Stage 2 Tour Méditerranéen, Jimmy Casper
Overall Les 3 Jours de Vaucluse, Nicolas Vogondy

Stage 1, Nicolas Vogondy

Classic Loire Atlantique, Mikel Gaztañaga
Stage 1 Tour de Normandie, Maxime Bouet
Stage 2, 3 & 4 Tour de Normandie, Anthony Ravard
Stage 6 Tour de Normandie, Steven Caethoven
Route Adélie de Vitré, Kevyn Ista
Stage 1 Circuit de la Sarthe, Anthony Ravard
Stage 3 Rhône-Alpes Isère Tour, Nicolas Vogondy
Stage 2 Circuit de Lorraine, Jimmy Casper
Boucles de l'Aulne, Romain Feillu
Overall Boucles de la Mayenne, Freddy Bichot

Prologue, Nicolas Vogondy
Stage 2, Jimmy Casper

France Road Race Championship, Nicolas Vogondy
Stage 5 Tour Alsace, Brice Feillu
Châteauroux Classic, Anthony Ravard
Overall Tour of Britain, Geoffroy Lequatre

Stage 3, Emilien Benoit Berges

Yellow jersey as leader of the general classification after stage 4, Tour de France, Romain Feillu
2009
Stage 3 Tour Méditerranéen, Kevyn Ista
Boucles du Sud Ardèche, Freddy Bichot
Overall Les 3 Jours de Vaucluse, David Lelay

Stage 1, Maxime Bouet

Stage 2 Tour de Normandie, Steven Caethoven
Stage 5 Tour de Normandie, Freddy Bichot
Overall Volta ao Alentejo, Maxime Bouet

Stage 1, Maxime Bouet

Overall Circuit de la Sarthe, David Lelay

Stage 2, David Lelay

Overall Rhône-Alpes Isère Tour, Yann Huguet

Stage 1, Nicolas Vogondy
Stage 2, Yann Huguet
Stage 3, Christophe Laurent

Stage 2 Tour de Picardie, Romain Feillu
Boucles de l'Aulne, Maxime Bouet
Tour du Doubs, Yann Huguet
Stage 7 Tour de France, Brice Feillu
Stage 1 Tour de Wallonie, Freddy Bichot
Stage 1 Paris–Corrèze, Freddy Bichot
Stage 4 Tour du Limousin, Romain Feillu
Stage 1 Tour du Poitou Charentes, Anthony Ravard
Grand Prix de Fourmies, Romain Feillu

== See also ==
- List of teams and cyclists in the 2008 Tour de France
- 2008 Tour de France
- Tour de France
