= David Lelay =

French cyclist

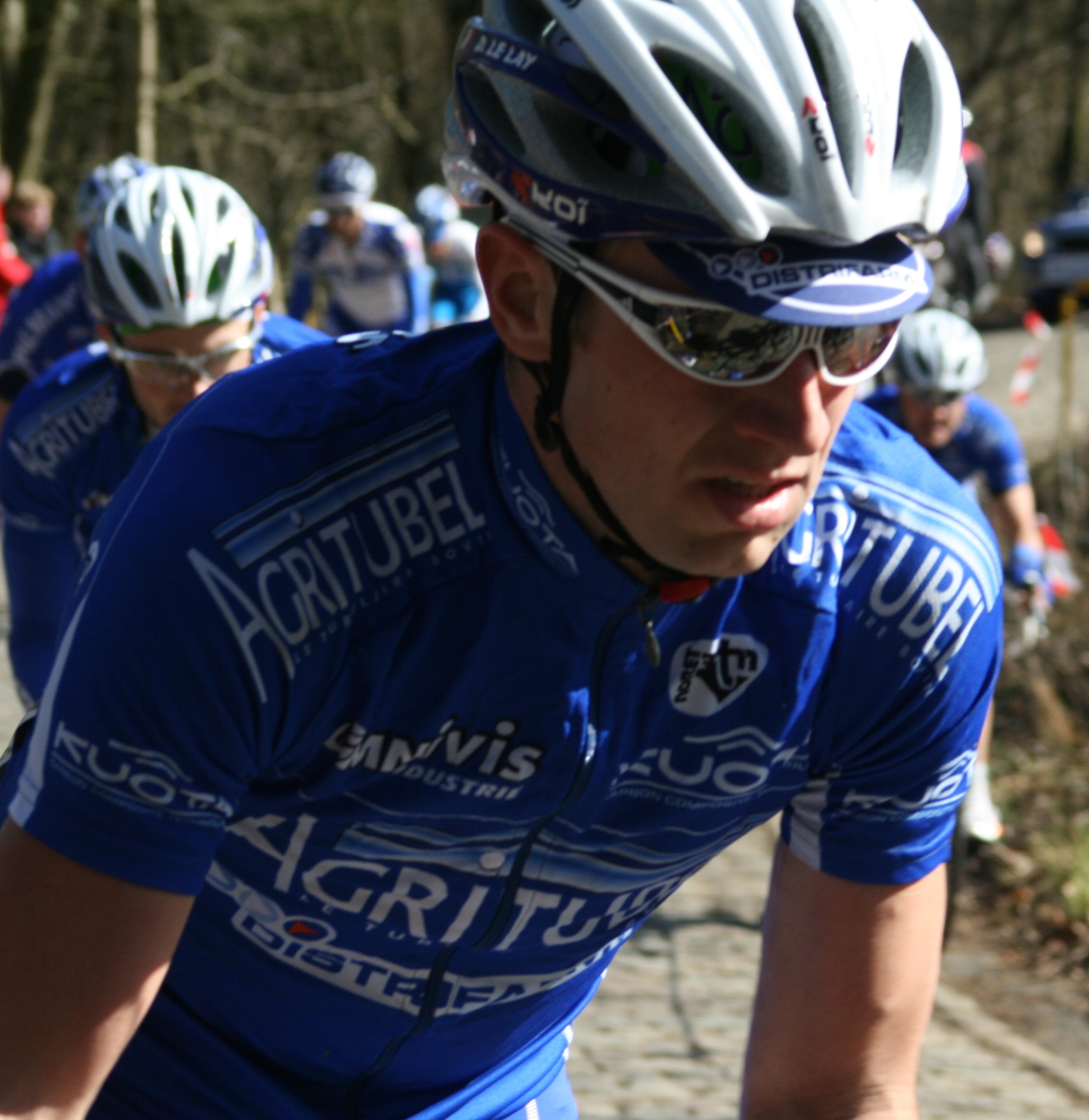

Personal information
- Full name: David Lelay
- Born: 30 December 1979 (age 46) Saint-Brieuc, France
- Height: 176 cm (5 ft 9 in)
- Weight: 67 kg (148 lb)

Cycling career
- Sport: Cycling
- Current team: VCP Loudéac
- Discipline: Road
- Role: Rider (retired); Team manager
- Rider type: Puncheur

Amateur teams
- 2001–2002: Jean Floc'h
- 2003–2004: Vélo-Club de Roubaix Lille Métropole
- 2014: Brest Iroise Cyclisme 2000

Professional teams
- 2005–2008: Bretagne–Jean Floc'h
- 2008–2009: Agritubel
- 2010–2011: Ag2r–La Mondiale
- 2012–2013: Saur–Sojasun

Managerial team
- 2018–: VCP Loudéac (directeur sportif)

David Lelay (born 30 December 1979) is a French former road bicycle racer, who is currently working as a directeur sportif for amateur team VCP Loudéac. He is the son of former rider Gilbert Lelay.

After nine seasons as a professional, Lelay joined amateur squad Brest Iroise Cyclisme 2000 for the 2014 season, after his previous team – Sojasun – folded at the end of the 2013 season.

== Major results ==
2000
2nd Overall Kreiz Breizh Elites
2001
1st Stage 1 Tour du Loir-et-Cher
2003
3rd Overall Boucles de la Mayenne
2005
2nd Overall Tour de la Somme
2006
1st Stage 2 Boucles de la Mayenne
2nd Overall Tour de Bretagne

1st Stage 1

5th Route Adélie
5th La Poly Normande
7th Overall Tour de la Somme
10th GP de Dourges-Hénin-Beaumont
2007
3rd Grand Prix de Plumelec-Morbihan
3rd Overall Tour de Bretagne
5th Overall Tour de Normandie
7th Route Adélie
8th Overall Tour du Limousin
2008
1st Tour du Finistère
1st Trophée des Grimpeurs
7th Boucles de l'Aulne
10th La Poly Normande
10th Grand Prix de Wallonie
2009
1st Overall Circuit Cycliste Sarthe

1st Stage 2

1st Overall Les 3 Jours de Vaucluse
2nd Overall Four Days of Dunkirk
2nd Route Adélie
3rd Time trial, National Road Championships
3rd Overall Tour du Poitou-Charentes
3rd Overall Bayern-Rundfahrt
3rd Classic Loire Atlantique
6th Tour du Finistère
6th Chrono des Nations
2010
5th Grand Prix de Plumelec-Morbihan
6th Duo Normand
2011
7th Overall Circuit de Lorraine
2012
1st Combination classification Tour du Poitou-Charentes
6th Overall Tour of Britain
