= Jan van der Horst (cyclist) =

Dutch cyclist (born 1942)

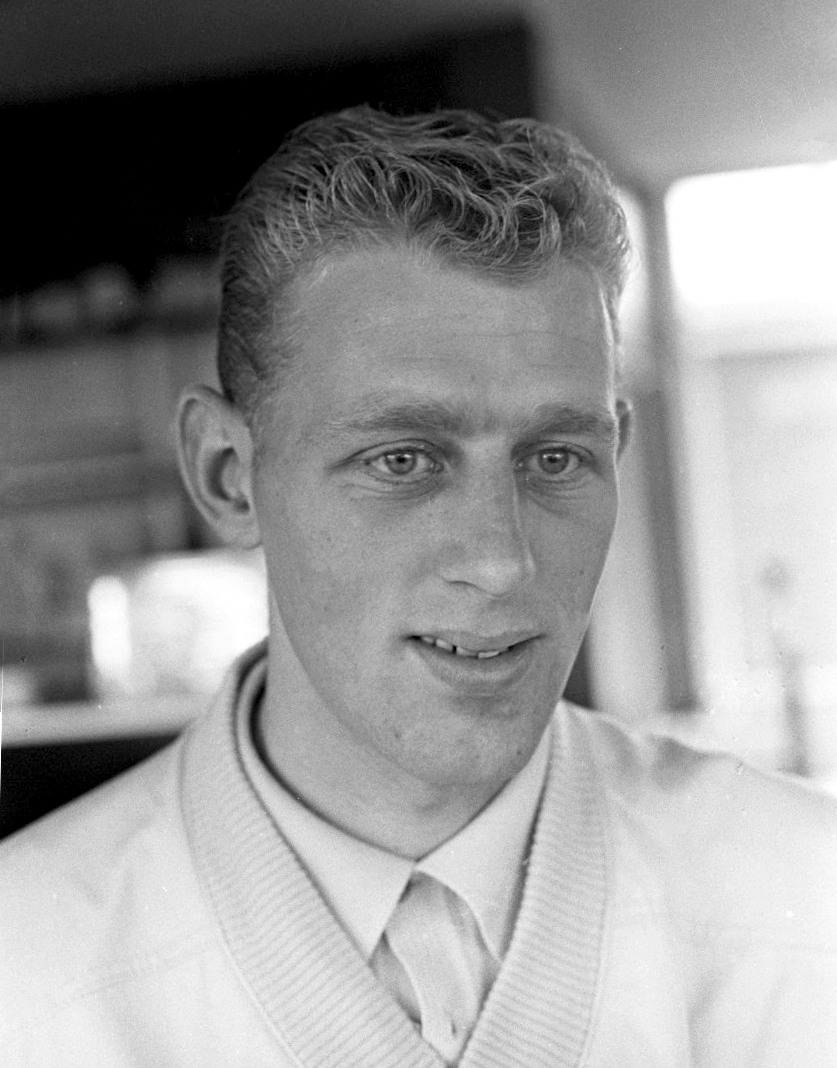
- Jan van der Horst in 1968

Personal information
- Born: 15 December 1942 (age 83) Haarlem, the Netherlands

Sport
- Sport: Cycling

Jan van der Horst (born 15 December 1942) is a retired Dutch road cyclist who was active between 1964 and 1973. In 1966 he won the Olympia's Tour, Circuit de Lorraine and a national road title.
