= Mikel Gaztañaga =

Spanish cyclist

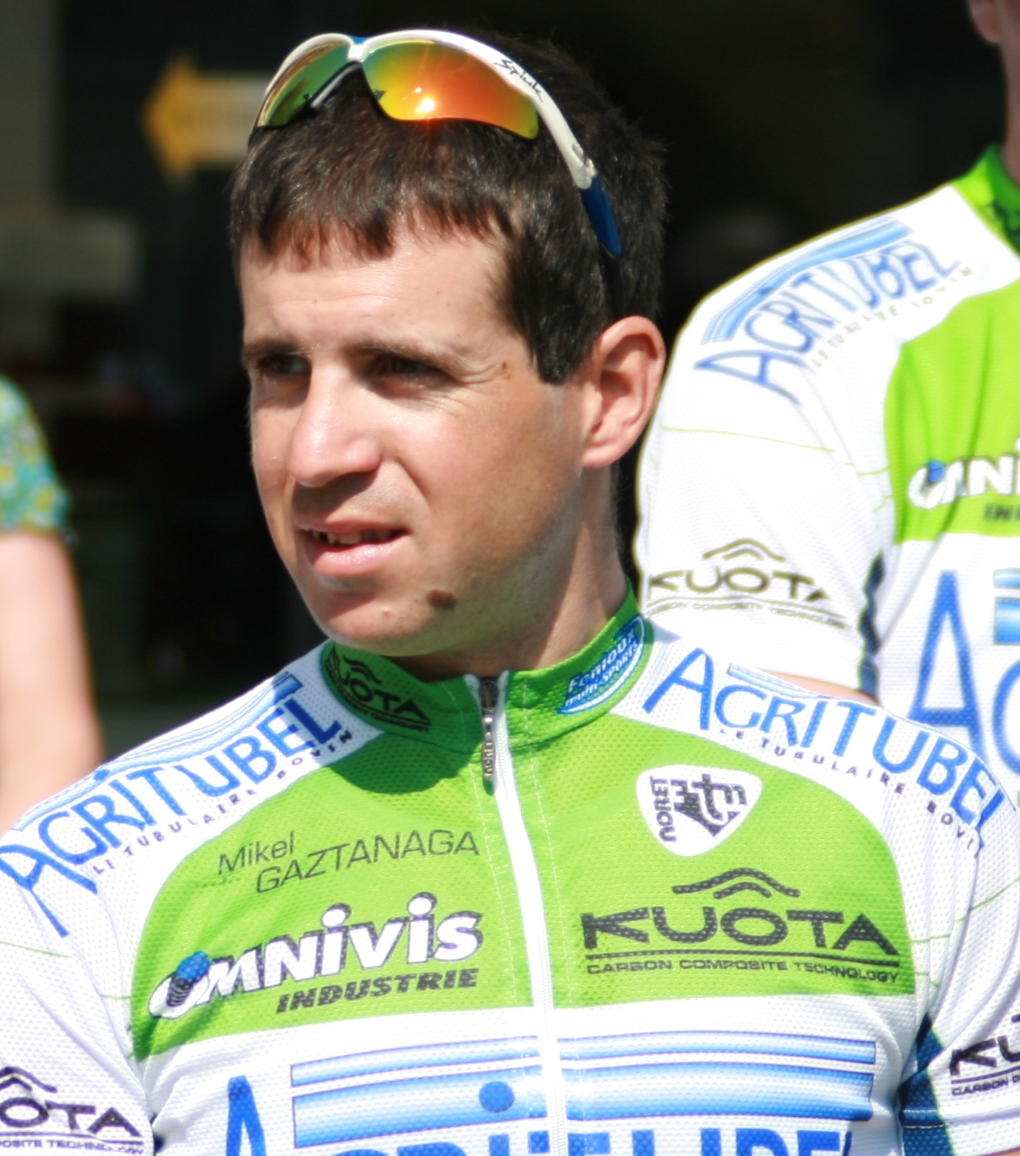

Personal information
- Full name: Mikel Gaztañaga Etxeberria
- Born: 30 December 1979 (age 46) Itsasondo, Spain

Cycling career
- Sport: Cycling
- Current team: Retired
- Discipline: Road
- Role: Rider

Amateur teams
- 2000: Caja Rural
- 2003: Cafés Baqué Amateur

Professional teams
- 2002: Matesica-Abóboda
- 2004: Cafés Baqué
- 2005: Catalunya–Ángel Mir
- 2006: Atom
- 2007–2008: Agritubel
- 2009: Contentpolis–Ampo

Mikel Gaztañaga Echevarria (born 30 December 1979) is a Spanish former professional road racing cyclist.

== Major results ==
2003
1st Stage 7 Circuito Montañés
1st Stage 3 Vuelta a Navarra
2005
5th Circuito de Getxo
7th Trofeo Alcudia
2006
1st Circuito de Getxo
1st Tour de Vendée
1st Stage 3 Vuelta Ciclista a la Comunidad de Madrid
2nd La Roue Tourangelle
3rd Tour du Finistère
8th Boucles de l'Aulne
2007
1st Tour de Vendée
1st Stage 1 GP Internacional Paredes Rota dos Móveis
5th GP de la Ville de Rennes
2008
1st Classic Loire-Atlantique
2009
3rd Circuito de Getxo
5th Tro-Bro Léon
