= Tour de Vendée =

French one-day road cycling race

Race details
- Date: October
- Region: Vendée, France
- English name: Tour of Vendée
- Local name: Tour de Vendée (in French)
- Discipline: Road race
- Competition: UCI Europe Tour
- Type: Single-day
- Web site: www.tourdevendee.fr

History
- First edition: 1972
- Editions: 53 (as of 2026)
- Most wins: Jaan Kirsipuu (EST) (4 wins)
- Most recent: Alexis Renard (FRA)

Tour de Vendée is a single-day road bicycle race held annually in October (Previously May) in the region of Vendée, France, finishing in a circuit inside La Roche-sur-Yon town. From 2005 until 2009, the race was organized as a 1.1 event on the UCI Europe Tour, moving to 1.HC classification in 2010, and also being part of the Coupe de France de cyclisme sur route. Between 1972 and 1979 it was an amateur race.

== Winners ==
Year	Country	Rider	Team
1980	France	Jean-René Bernaudeau	Renault–Gitane
1981	France	Bernard Bourreau	Peugeot–Esso–Michelin
1982	France	Serge Beucherie	Sem–France Loire
1983	France	Pierre Bazzo	Coop–Mercier–Mavic
1984	France	Claude Moreau	Coop–Hoonved
1985	France	Michel Bibollet	Fagor
1986	France	Francis Castaing	RMO–Cycles Méral–Mavic
1987	France	Jean-Claude Colotti	RMO–Cycles Méral–Mavic
1988	Spain	Alberto Leanizbarrutia	Teka
1989	France	Laurent Bezault	Toshiba
1990	France	François Lemarchand	Z–Tomasso
1991	Belgium	Fabrice Naessens	Lotto
1992	France	Bruno Cornillet	Z
1993	Russia	Dimitri Zhdanov	Novemail–Histor–Laser Computer
1994	Belgium	Patrick Van Roosbroeck	Trident–Schick
1995	Belgium	Mario De Clercq	Lotto–Isoglass
1996	France	Laurent Desbiens	GAN
1997	Estonia	Jaan Kirsipuu	Casino
1998	Italy	Marco Di Renzo	Cantina Tollo–Alexia Alluminio
1999	Estonia	Jaan Kirsipuu	Casino–Ag2r Prévoyance
2000	Estonia	Jaan Kirsipuu	AG2R Prévoyance
2001	France	Didier Rous	Bonjour
2002	France	Franck Bouyer	Bonjour
2003	Estonia	Jaan Kirsipuu	AG2R Prévoyance
2004	Norway	Thor Hushovd	Crédit Agricole
2005	Sweden	Jonas Ljungblad	Amore & Vita–Beretta
2006	Spain	Mikel Gaztañaga	Atom
2007	Spain	Mikel Gaztañaga	Agritubel
2008	Spain	Koldo Fernández	Euskaltel–Euskadi
2009	Russia	Pavel Brutt	Team Katusha
2010	Spain	Koldo Fernández	Euskaltel–Euskadi
2011	Italy	Marco Marcato	Vacansoleil–DCM
2012	Netherlands	Wesley Kreder	Vacansoleil–DCM
2013	France	Nacer Bouhanni	FDJ.fr
2014	France	Armindo Fonseca	Bretagne–Séché Environnement
2015	France	Christophe Laporte	Cofidis
2016	France	Nacer Bouhanni	Cofidis
2017	France	Christophe Laporte	Cofidis
2018	Germany	Nico Denz	AG2R La Mondiale
2019	France	Marc Sarreau	Groupama–FDJ
2020	No race due to the COVID-19 pandemic		
2021	Netherlands	Bram Welten	Arkéa–Samsic
2022	France	Bryan Coquard	Cofidis
2023	France	Arnaud Démare	Arkéa–Samsic
2024	No race		
2025	France	Dorian Godon	Decathlon–AG2R La Mondiale
2026	France	Alexis Renard	Cofidis
