= Alpes Isère Tour =

French multi-day road cycling race

Race details
- Date: Mid-May
- Region: Rhône-Alpes, France
- Local name: Alpes Isère Tour (in French)
- Discipline: Road race
- Competition: UCI Europe Tour
- Type: Stage race
- Web site: www.alpesiseretour.com

History
- First edition: 1991
- Editions: 35 (as of 2026)
- First winner: Denis Moretti (FRA)
- Most wins: Éric Drubay (FRA) (2 wins)
- Most recent: Matisse Van Kerckhove (BEL)

Alpes Isère Tour is a road bicycle race held annually in the French Department of Rhône-Alpes. The editions 1991–2004 were reserved to amateurs; since 2005, it is organized as a 2.2 event on the UCI Europe Tour.

1991–2005: Tour Nord-Isère
2006–2019: Rhône-Alpes Isère Tour
2021– : Alpes Isère Tour

== Winners ==
Year	Country	Rider	Team
1991	France	Denis Moretti	CC Etupes
1992	France	Francisque Teyssier	VC Lyon
1993	France	David Orcel	VC Lyon
1994	France	Frédéric Gabriel	CM Aubervilliers
1995	France	Dominique Mollard	CC Chatillon
1996	France	Stéphane Houillon	Bataillon de Joinville
1997	France	Éric Drubay	CC Etupes
1998	France	Marc Thevenin	Cr4C Roanne
1999	France	Éric Drubay	CC Etupes
2000	Colombia	Marlon Pérez	RDM Bianchi Team
2001	France	David Pagnier	Charvieu-Chavagneux Isère Cyclisme
2002	Belgium	Jef Peeters	Think Media Cycling Team
2003	France	Christophe Morel	Bressuire AC
2004	France	Laurent Mangel	SCO Dijon
2005	Netherlands	Maint Berkenbosch	Trientalis–Apac Team
2006	Croatia	Tomislav Dančulović	Perutnina Ptuj
2007	Norway	Gabriel Rasch	Maxbo–Bianchi
2008	France	Jérémie Derangere	SCO Dijon
2009	France	Yann Huguet	Agritubel
2010	France	Jérôme Coppel	Saur–Sojasun
2011	France	Sylvain Georges	BigMat–Auber 93
2012	France	Paul Poux	Saur–Sojasun
2013	Belgium	Nico Sijmens	Cofidis
2014	Croatia	Matija Kvasina	Gourmetfein–Simplon Wels
2015	Netherlands	Sam Oomen	Rabobank Development Team
2016	Netherlands	Lennard Hofstede	Rabobank Development Team
2017	Netherlands	Marco Minnaard	Wanty–Groupe Gobert
2018	Austria	Stephan Rabitsch	Team Felbermayr–Simplon Wels
2019	Austria	Matthias Krizek	Team Felbermayr–Simplon Wels
2020	No race due to COVID-19 pandemic		
2021	Netherlands	Sjoerd Bax	Metec–Solarwatt p/b Mantel
2022	Switzerland	Yannis Voisard	Tudor Pro Cycling Team
2023	Belgium	Lennert Van Eetvelt	Lotto–Dstny Development Team
2024	Belgium	Jarno Widar	Lotto–Dstny Development Team
2025	France	Aubin Sparfel	Decathlon–AG2R La Mondiale Development Team
2026	Belgium	Matisse Van Kerckhove	Visma–Lease a Bike Development
