= SCO Dijon–Team Matériel-Velo.com =

French road cycling team

Team information
- UCI code: SCO
- Registered: France
- Founded: 1993
- Discipline: Road
- Status: DN1 (–2025); UCI Continental (2026–)

Key personnel
- General manager: Paul Herman
- Team managers: Mathieu Gallet; Guillaume Souyris

Team name history
- 1993–2004 2005–2007 2008–2012 2013 2014–2025 2026–: SCO Dijon; SCO Dijon Lapierre; SCO Dijon; SCO Dijon–Team Matériel-Velo.com; SCO Dijon; SCO Dijon–Team Matériel-Velo.com

SCO Dijon–Team Matériel-Velo.com, also known as the Sprinter Club Olympique Dijon, is a French UCI Continental road cycling team based in Dijon. Established in 1993, it was a national first-division (DN1) club team until 2026.
