= José Alberto Martínez =

Spanish cyclist

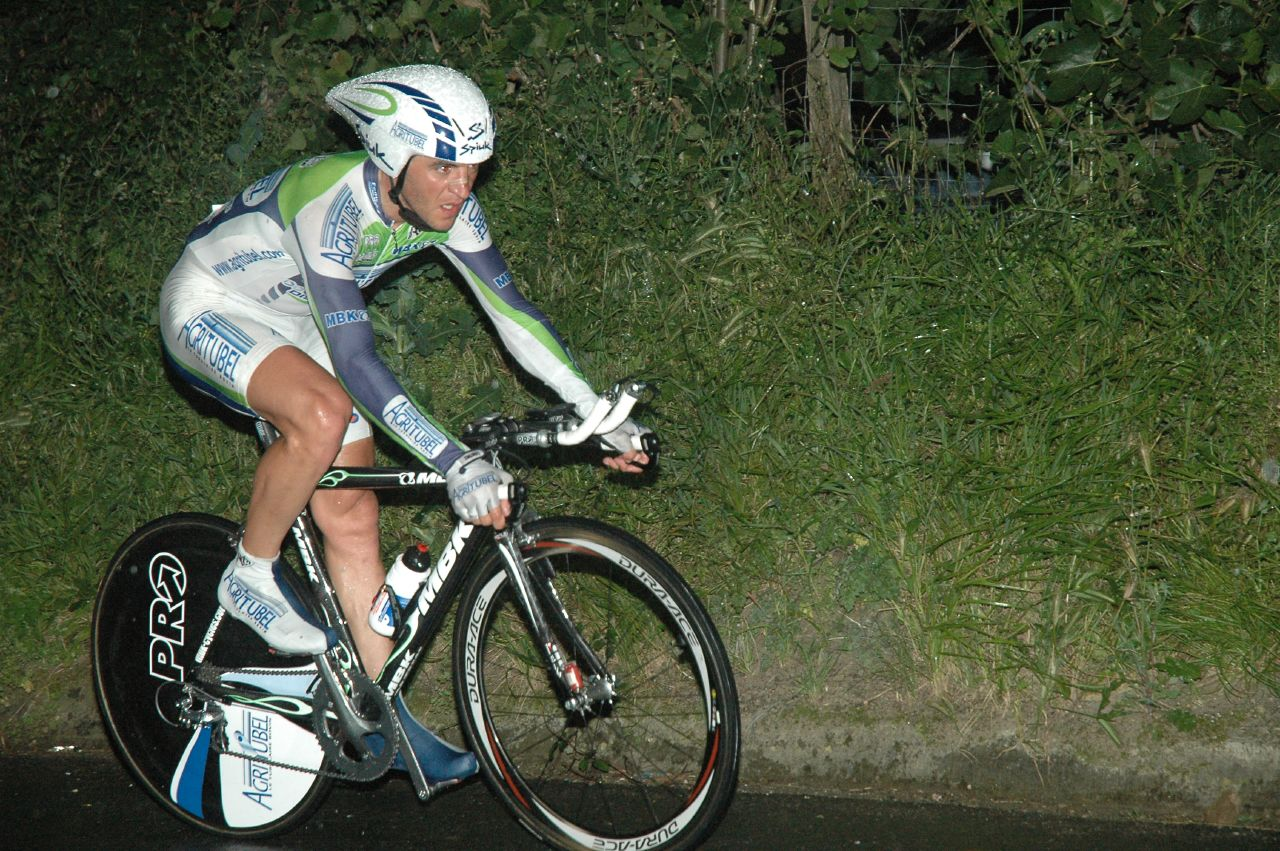
- Martinez during stage 2b of the 2007 Euskal Bizikleta

Personal information
- Born: 10 September 1975 (age 51) Urdiain, Navarre, Spain

Cycling career
- Sport: Cycling
- Current team: Retired
- Discipline: Road

Professional teams
- 1998–2003: Euskaltel–Euskadi
- 2004: Relax–Bodysol
- 2005–2007: Agritubel

José Alberto Martínez Trinidad (born 10 September 1975) is a Spanish former professional road cyclist.

== Career achievements ==
=== Major results ===
1999
2nd Overall Euskal Bizikleta
3rd Overall Grand Prix du Midi Libre

1st Stage 1

2000
1st Stage 1 Vuelta a Burgos
2nd Overall G.P. Portugal Telecom
3rd Overall Volta a la Comunitat Valenciana
3rd Overall Vuelta a Murcia
2001
2nd Overall Critérium International
2nd Overall Tour of the Basque Country
2002
1st Overall Critérium International
2005
1st Classic Loire Atlantique
2006
1st Overall Bayern-Rundfahrt
1st Stage 3 Critérium International

=== Grand Tour general classification results timeline ===
Grand Tour	2000	2001	2002	2003	2004	2005	2006
Giro d'Italia	—	—	—	—	—	—	DNF
Tour de France	—	—	—	—	—	—	DNF
Vuelta a España	DNF	28	112	31	DNF	—	—
