= Yann Huguet =

French cyclist

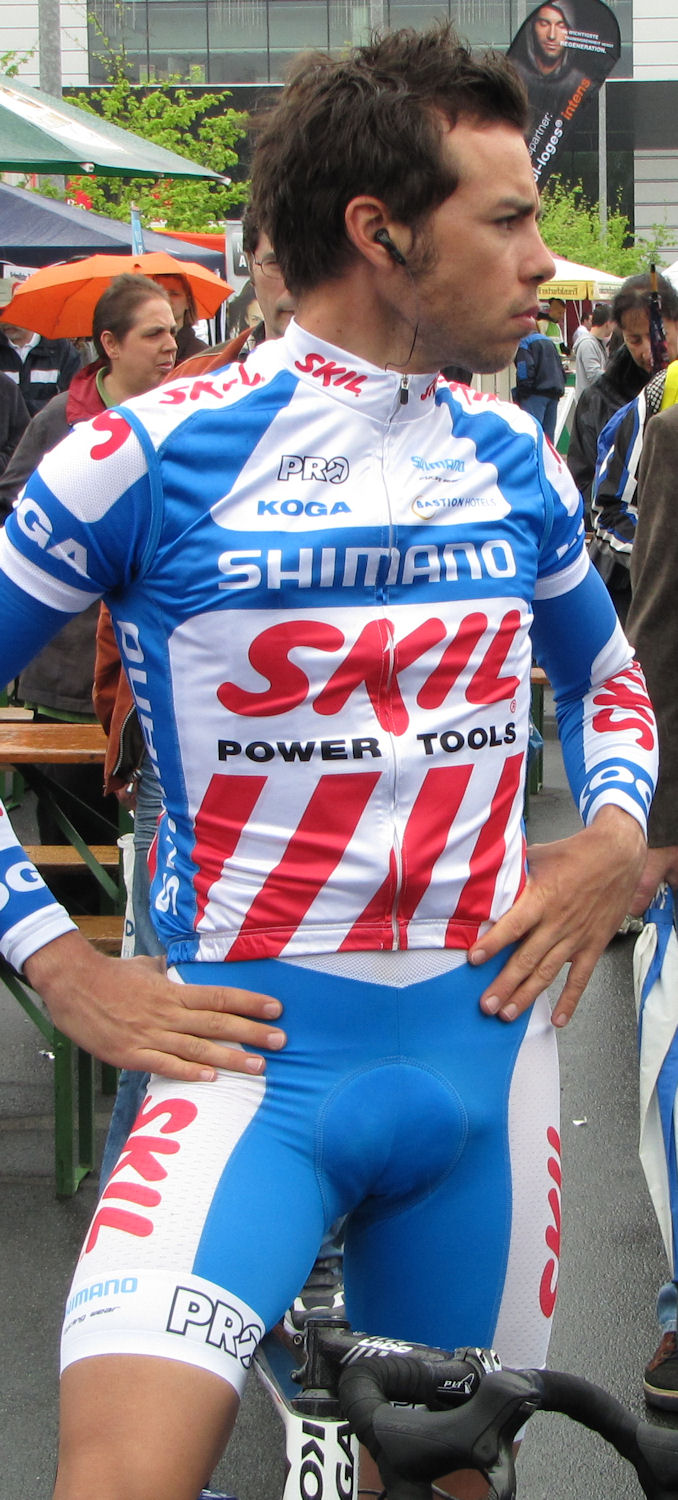
- Huguet at the 2010 Eschborn-Frankfurt City Loop.

Personal information
- Full name: Yann Huguet
- Born: 2 May 1984 (age 42) Lesparre, France
- Height: 1.77 m (5 ft 10 in)
- Weight: 65 kg (143 lb)

Cycling career
- Sport: Cycling
- Current team: Retired
- Discipline: Road
- Role: Rider

Amateur team
- 2005–2006: AVC Aix-En-Provence

Professional teams
- 2007–2008: Cofidis
- 2009: Agritubel
- 2010–2013: Skil–Shimano

Yann Huguet (born 2 May 1984, in Lesparre) is a French former professional road bicycle racer, who competed as a professional between 2007 and 2013. Huguet competed for the Argos–Shimano, Agritubel and Cofidis squads. He had two major victories in his career, the first at the 2009 Tour du Doubs, and the second at the Hel van Het Mergelland.

== Major results ==
2005
1st, Stage 2, Giro della Valle d'Aosta
2006
1st, Stage 4, Giro delle Regione
1st, Stage 5, Vuelta a Navarra
2007
2nd, Tour du Finistère
2nd, GP Plumelec-Morbihan
3rd, Route Adélie
2010
1st, Hel van het Mergelland
