= Freddy Bichot =

French road racing cyclist

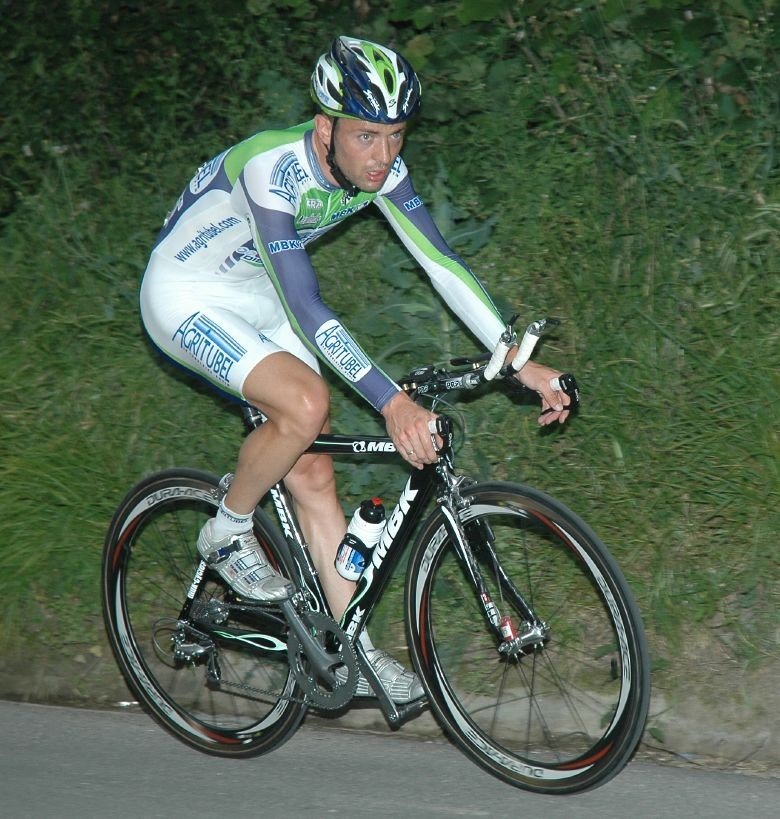

Personal information
- Full name: Freddy Bichot
- Born: 9 September 1979 (age 47) Saint-Fort, France

Cycling career
- Sport: Cycling
- Current team: Véranda Rideau-Super U
- Discipline: Road
- Role: Rider

Amateur teams
- 2002: Française des Jeux (stagiaire)
- 2011: Team Véranda Rideau Sarthe

Professional teams
- 2003: Barloworld
- 2004–2006: FDJeux.com
- 2007–2009: Agritubel
- 2010: Bbox Bouygues Telecom
- 2012: Véranda Rideau-Super U

Freddy Bichot (born 9 September 1979) is a French road racing cyclist who last rode for Véranda Rideau-Super U.

After rising from relative obscurity, in 2002 he won the French Amateur National Championship, yet later tested positive for testosterone. He was suspended for a year, and within months of returning to the amateur ranks, was signed as a professional to Team Barloworld.

Bichot participated in the 2004 Giro d'Italia, when he withdrew after stage 9. In 2005 he did the same, but withdrew after stage 13. That same year he won the first stage of the Étoile de Bessèges and also won the overall rankings of that race. He also took part in the 2006 Vuelta a España and the 2007 and 2008 Tour de France.

== Major results ==
2005
1st, Stage 1, Étoile de Bessèges
1st, overall, Étoile de Bessèges
2007
Stage 20 Combativity award, Tour de France
2009
1st, Stage 1, Paris–Corrèze
1st, Stage 1, Tour de Wallonie
1st, Les Boucles du Sud Ardèche
2012
1st Sprints classification Tour du Limousin
