= Classic Loire Atlantique =

French one-day road cycling race

Race details
- Date: Late-March
- Region: Loire, France
- Local name: Classic Loire Atlantique (in French)
- Discipline: Road race
- Competition: UCI Europe Tour
- Type: Single-day
- Web site: classic-loire-atlantique.fr

History
- First edition: 2000
- Editions: 25 (as of 2026)
- First winner: Frédéric Delalande (FRA)
- Most wins: Alexis Gougeard (FRA) (2 wins)
- Most recent: Iúri Leitão (POR)

Classic Loire Atlantique is a road bicycle race held annually in the French department of Loire-Atlantique. Since 2011, it is organized as a 1.1 event on the UCI Europe Tour, after upgrading from category 1.2.

== Winners ==
Year	Country	Rider	Team
2000	France	Frédéric Delalande	
2001	France	Nicolas L'Hote	
2002	Norway	Rune Jogert	Krone
2003	France	Thomas Voeckler	Brioches La Boulangère
2004	Estonia	Erki Pütsep	AG2R Prévoyance
2005	Spain	José Alberto Martínez	Agritubel–Loudun
2006	Russia	Sergey Kolesnikov	Omnibike Dynamo Moscow
2007	France	Nicolas Jalabert	Agritubel
2008	Spain	Mikel Gaztañaga	Agritubel
2009	France	Cyril Bessy	Besson Chaussures–Sojasun
2010	France	Laurent Mangel	Saur–Sojasun
2011	Netherlands	Lieuwe Westra	Vacansoleil–DCM
2012	France	Florian Vachon	Bretagne–Schuller
2013	Belgium	Edwig Cammaerts	Cofidis
2014	France	Alexis Gougeard	Ag2r–La Mondiale
2015	France	Alexis Gougeard	AG2R La Mondiale
2016	France	Anthony Turgis	Cofidis
2017	France	Laurent Pichon	Fortuneo–Vital Concept
2018	Denmark	Rasmus Quaade	BHS–Almeborg Bornholm
2019	France	Rudy Barbier	Israel Cycling Academy
2020	No race due to the COVID-19 pandemic		
2021	France	Alan Riou	Arkéa–Samsic
2022	France	Anthony Perez	Cofidis
2023	France	Axel Zingle	Cofidis
2024	France	Paul Lapeira	Decathlon–AG2R La Mondiale
2025	No race		
2026	Portugal	Iúri Leitão	Caja Rural–Seguros RGA
