= Les 3 Jours de Vaucluse =

Cyclism competition

Race details
- Date: Late-February
- Region: Vaucluse, France
- English name: 3 days of Vaucluse
- Discipline: Road
- Competition: UCI Europe Tour
- Type: Stage race

History
- First edition: 2007
- Editions: 3 (as of 2009)
- First winner: Sebastien Turgot (FRA)
- Most recent: David Lelay (FRA)

Les 3 Jours de Vaucluse is a road bicycle race held annually in the French department of Vaucluse. It is contested over three days. The first edition was held in 2007; it is classified as a 2.2 event on the UCI Europe Tour.

== Winners ==
Year	Country	Rider	Team
2007	France	Sébastien Turgot	Vendée U
2008	France	Nicolas Vogondy	Agritubel
2009	France	David Lelay	Agritubel
