= Circuit de Lorraine =

Bicycle racing event in Lorraine, France

Race details
- Date: Late May
- Region: Lorraine, France
- English name: Circuit of Lorraine
- Local name: Circuit de Lorraine (in French)
- Discipline: Road
- Competition: UCI Europe Tour
- Type: Stage race
- Web site: www.lorraine.eu/accueil.html

History
- First edition: 1956
- First winner: Pierre Lambollez (FRA)
- Most recent: Nacer Bouhanni (FRA)

The Circuit de Lorraine is a multi-stage road bicycle racing event held annually in Lorraine, France. Since 2005, it has been organised as a 2.1 event on the UCI Europe Tour.

Between 1956 and 1994, it was an amateur race, becoming a professional race called Circuit des Mines in 1995.

== Winners ==
Year	Country	Rider	Team
1956	France	Pierre Lambollez	
1957	France	Henri Wasilewski	
1958	France	René Osterdag	
1959	France	Noël Chavy	
1960	France	Marcel Hocquaux	
1961	Belgium	Robert Duveau	
1962	France	Ugo Anzile	
1963	Italy	Elio Gerussi	
1964	France	Jean-Pierre Magnien	
1965	France	Maurice Izier	
1966	Netherlands	Jan van der Horst	
1967	France	Joseph Pare	
1968	Netherlands	Fedor den Hertog	
1969	Netherlands	Joop Zoetemelk	
1970	Poland	Andrejz Kaczmarek	
1971	Netherlands	Mathijs De Koning	
1977	Netherlands	Johan Van Den Meer	
1978	Netherlands	Gérard Mak	
1979	Great Britain	Tony Doyle	
1980	France	Frédéric Vichot	
1981	France	Régis Simon	
1982	France	Jean-Paul Hosotte	
1983	Poland	Zbigniew Kraśnik	
1984	Netherlands	Teun van Vliet	
1985	France	Pascal Lance	
1986	Great Britain	Paul Curran	
1987	France	Gilles Figue	
1988	France	Pascal Lance	
1989	France	Bruno Huger	
1990	France	Régis Simon	
1991	Soviet Union	Nikolai Galichin	
1992	Italy	Diego Ferrari	
1993	France	Jean-Christophe Currit	
1994	France	Christophe Mengin	
1995	France	Grégoire Balland	
1996	Italy	Stefano Dante	Cantina Tollo–Co.Bo.
1997	France	Eddy Seigneur	Française des Jeux
1998	Kazakhstan	Alexander Vinokourov	Casino–Ag2r
1999	Lithuania	Arturas Kasputis	Casino–Ag2r Prévoyance
2000	Denmark	Nicki Sørensen	Fakta
2001	Great Britain	Chris Newton	Great Britain (national team)
2002	Italy	Giampaolo Cheula	Mapei–Quick-Step
2003	France	Guillaume Auger	BigMat–Auber 93
2004	Netherlands	Joost Posthuma	Rabobank
2005	Latvia	Andris Naudužs	Naturino–Sapore di Mare
2006	Colombia	Mauricio Soler	Acqua & Sapone
2007	Germany	Jörg Jaksche	Tinkoff Credit Systems
2008	France	Steve Chainel	Auber 93
2009	Italy	Matteo Carrara	Vacansoleil
2010	Italy	Fabio Felline	Footon–Servetto–Fuji
2011	France	Anthony Roux	FDJ
2012	France	Nacer Bouhanni	FDJ–BigMat
