= 2006 Tour de France, Prologue to Stage 11 =

Cycling race stages

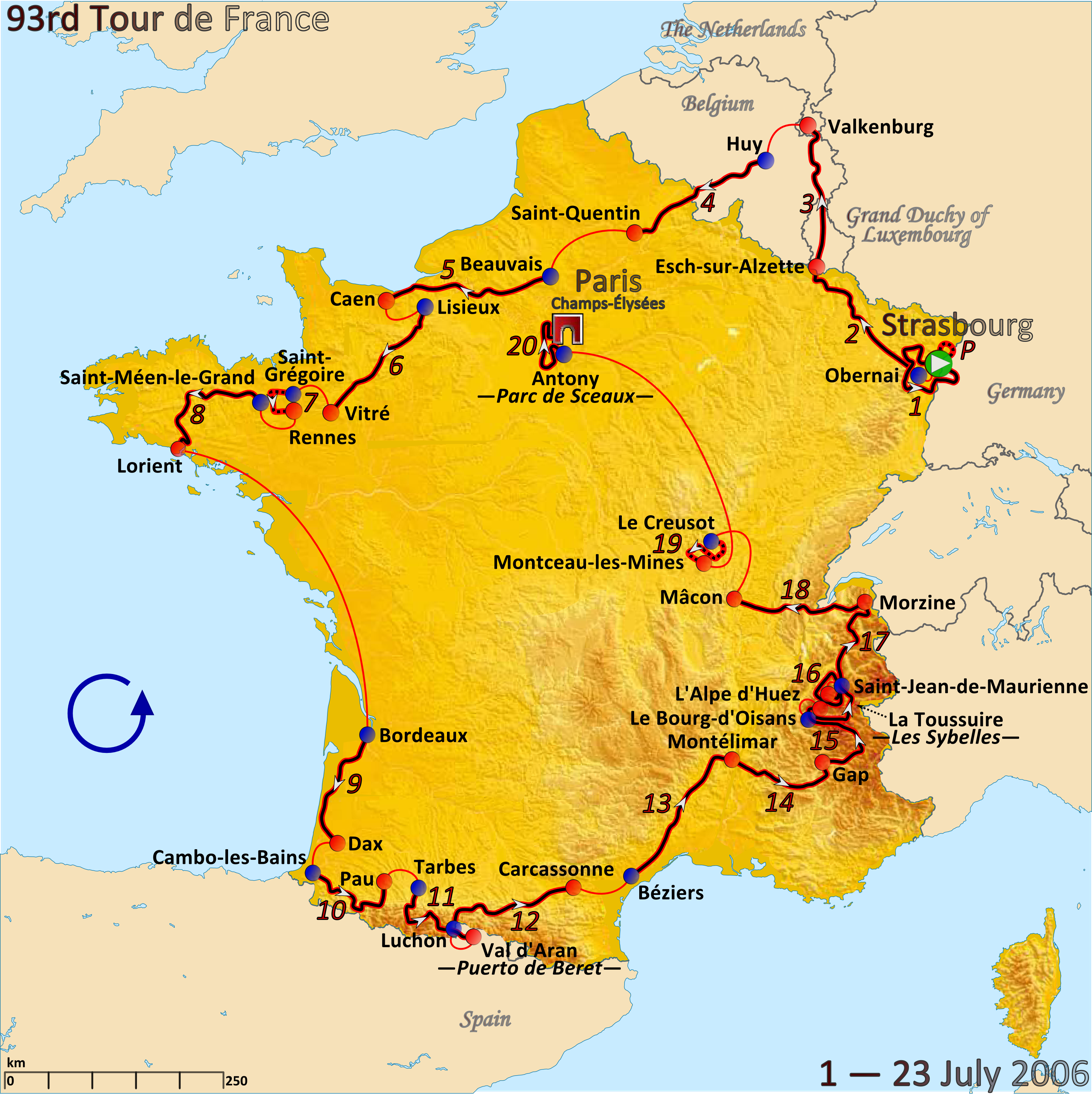
Route of the 2006 Tour de France

The 2006 Tour de France was the 93rd edition of Tour de France, one of cycling's Grand Tours. The Tour began in Strasbourg with a prologue individual time trial on 1 July and Stage 11 occurred on 13 July with a mountainous stage to Val d'Aran in Spain. The race finished on the Champs-Élysées in Paris, on 23 July.

== Prologue ==
1 July 2006 — Strasbourg, 7.1 km (4.4 mi) (ITT)

The prologue is a short (7.1 km/4.4 mile), completely flat, time trial, as is customary. It took place in the French city of Strasbourg.

Thor Hushovd, the 2004 and 2005 Norwegian National Time Trial Cycling Champion, captured a third stage win and second yellow jersey in his career.

Prologue result and general classification after prologue

Rank	Rider	Team	Time
1	Thor Hushovd (NOR)	Crédit Agricole	8' 17"
2	George Hincapie (USA)	Discovery Channel	s.t.
3	David Zabriskie (USA)	Team CSC	+ 4"
4	Sebastian Lang (GER)	Gerolsteiner	s.t.
5	Alejandro Valverde (ESP)	Caisse d'Epargne–Illes Balears	s.t.
6	Stuart O'Grady (AUS)	Team CSC	s.t.
7	Michael Rogers (AUS)	T-Mobile Team	+ 6"
8	Paolo Savoldelli (ITA)	Discovery Channel	+ 8"
9	Floyd Landis (USA)	Phonak	+ 9"
10	Vladimir Karpets (RUS)	Caisse d'Epargne–Illes Balears	+ 10"

Note: George Hincapie got to wear the green jersey, as a rider cannot wear two leading jerseys at the same time.

== Stage 1 ==
2 July 2006 — Strasbourg to Strasbourg, 184.5 km (114.6 mi)

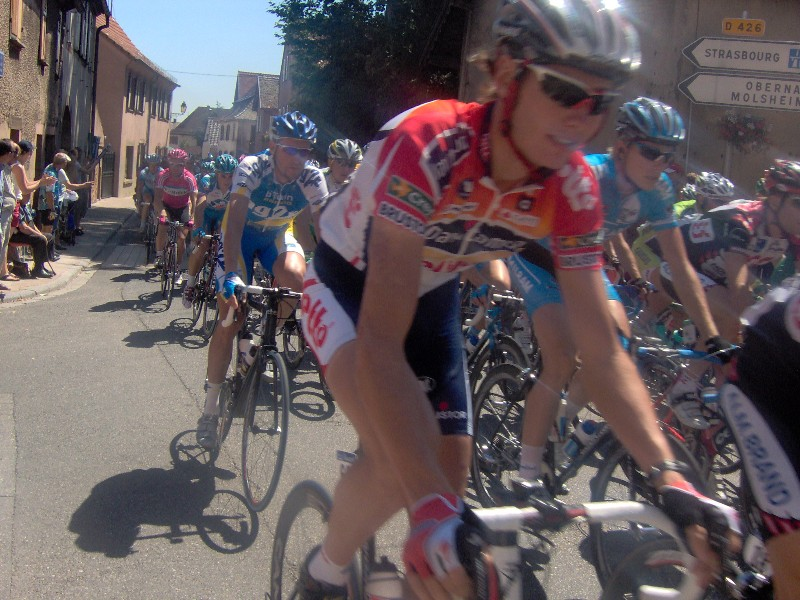
Stage 1.

Stage 1 was a largely flat sprinter stage with a category 4 climb up the small Côte de Heiligenstein about halfway through the stage at the 101.5 km (63.1 mi) mark, and three intermediate sprints throughout the length of the course. The sprints were in Saverne (at 53.0 km/32.9 mile), Plobsheim (137.0 km/85.1 mile), and Kehl (175.5 km/109.0 mile). The stage was a 184.5 km (114.6 mi) long loop, starting and finishing in Strasbourg.

An early breakaway consisting of Stéphane Augé (Cofidis), Walter Bénéteau (Bouygues Télécom), Unai Etxebarria (Euskaltel–Euskadi), Nicolas Portal (Caisse d'Epargne), Matthieu Sprick (Bouygues Télécom), Benoît Vaugrenard (Française des Jeux), and Fabian Wegmann (Team Gerolsteiner) formed by the 22 km (14 mi) mark and gained a lead of 4:35 over the main peloton before being caught in the last 30 km (19 mi). That allowed Wegmann to take the polka dot jersey for winning the race up the lone climb.

A fast George Hincapie won two bonus seconds and with them the yellow jersey at the last sprint, despite a quick damage control operation by Sébastien Hinault who took the four second bonus to protect his captain, Thor Hushovd.

At the very end of the stage, Thor Hushovd (who was wearing the yellow jersey) made contact with a cardboard sign from green-jersey sponsor PMU held by a spectator. Hushovd cut his right arm badly, but was able to stay in the race.

Stage 1 result

Rank	Rider	Team	Time
1	Jimmy Casper (FRA)	Cofidis	4h 10' 00"
2	Robbie McEwen (AUS)	Davitamon–Lotto	s.t.
3	Erik Zabel (GER)	Team Milram	s.t.
4	Daniele Bennati (ITA)	Lampre–Fondital	s.t.
5	Luca Paolini (ITA)	Liquigas	s.t.
6	Isaac Gálvez (ESP)	Caisse d'Epargne–Illes Balears	s.t.
7	Stuart O'Grady (AUS)	Team CSC	s.t.
8	Bernhard Eisel (AUT)	Française des Jeux	s.t.
9	Thor Hushovd (NOR)	Crédit Agricole	s.t.
10	Óscar Freire (ESP)	Rabobank	s.t.

General classification after stage 1

Rank	Rider	Team	Time
1	George Hincapie (USA)	Discovery Channel	4h 18' 15"
2	Thor Hushovd (NOR)	Crédit Agricole	+ 2"
3	David Zabriskie (USA)	Team CSC	+ 6"
4	Sebastian Lang (GER)	Gerolsteiner	s.t.
5	Alejandro Valverde (ESP)	Caisse d'Epargne–Illes Balears	s.t.
6	Stuart O'Grady (AUS)	Team CSC	s.t.
7	Michael Rogers (AUS)	T-Mobile Team	+ 8"
8	Paolo Savoldelli (ITA)	Discovery Channel	+ 10"
9	Floyd Landis (USA)	Phonak	+ 11"
10	Benoît Vaugrenard (FRA)	Française des Jeux	s.t.

== Stage 2 ==
3 July 2006 — Obernai to Esch-sur-Alzette (Luxembourg), 228.5 km (142.0 mi)

Stage 2 started in the small French town of Obernai and ended in Luxembourg and is the second longest of the Tour. This stage is 228.5 km/141.9 miles long with rolling terrain. It has five categorized climbs (two Category 3 and three Category 4):

- Col des Pandours (Category 3 at 35.5 km/22.0 miles)
- Col de Valsberg (Category 3 at 50.0 km/31.1 miles)
- Côte de Kedange-sur-Canner (Category 4 at 187.5 km/116.5 miles)
- Côte de Kanfen (Category 4 at 212.5 km/132.0 miles)
- Côte de Volmerange-les-Mines (Category 4 at 215.0 km/133.5 miles)

There were three intermediate sprints in Marimont-lès-Bénestroff (at 107.0 km/66.5 miles), Holling (169.5 km/105.3 miles), and Yutz (198.5 km/123.3 miles).

The stage was primarily dominated by a two-man breakaway almost at the start by David de la Fuente and Aitor Hernández. They were caught in the late climbs, and De La Fuente took over the polka dot jersey.

A crash in the last 2 km (1.2 mi) slowed the peloton considerably, although they were all credited with the same time as the leaders. Thor Hushovd reclaimed the yellow jersey due to sprint bonuses.

Stage 2 result

Rank	Rider	Team	Time
1	Robbie McEwen (AUS)	Davitamon–Lotto	5h 36' 14"
2	Tom Boonen (BEL)	Quick-Step–Innergetic	s.t.
3	Thor Hushovd (NOR)	Crédit Agricole	s.t.
4	Óscar Freire (ESP)	Rabobank	s.t.
5	Daniele Bennati (ITA)	Lampre–Fondital	s.t.
6	Luca Paolini (ITA)	Liquigas	s.t.
7	Stuart O'Grady (AUS)	Team CSC	s.t.
8	Bernhard Eisel (AUT)	Française des Jeux	s.t.
9	Erik Zabel (GER)	Team Milram	s.t.
10	Peter Wrolich (AUT)	Gerolsteiner	s.t.

General classification after stage 2

Rank	Rider	Team	Time
1	Thor Hushovd (NOR)	Crédit Agricole	9h 54' 19"
2	Tom Boonen (BEL)	Quick-Step–Innergetic	+ 5"
3	Robbie McEwen (AUS)	Davitamon–Lotto	+ 8"
4	George Hincapie (USA)	Discovery Channel	+ 10"
5	David Zabriskie (USA)	Team CSC	+ 16"
6	Sebastian Lang (GER)	Gerolsteiner	s.t.
7	Alejandro Valverde (ESP)	Caisse d'Epargne–Illes Balears	s.t.
8	Stuart O'Grady (AUS)	Team CSC	s.t.
9	Michael Rogers (AUS)	T-Mobile Team	+ 18"
10	Paolo Savoldelli (ITA)	Discovery Channel	+ 20"

== Stage 3 ==
4 July 2006 — Esch-sur-Alzette to Valkenburg (Netherlands), 216.5 km (134.5 mi)

Like stage 2, stage 3 (216.5 km/134.5 miles long) has a rolling profile with six categorized climbs and three intermediate sprints. Starting in Luxembourg the stage passes through Belgium before finishing in Valkenburg in the Netherlands, which is also the traditional site of the finish in the Amstel Gold Race cycling classic.

The following are the categorized climbs:

- Côte de la Haute-Levée (Category 3 at 131 km/81.4 miles)
- Côte d'Oneux (Category 3 at 155 km/96.3 miles)
- Côte de Petit-Rechain (Category 4 at 165.5 km/102.8 miles)
- Loorberg (Category 4 at 189 km/117.4 miles)
- Trintelenberg (Category 4 at 201 km/124.9 miles)
- Cauberg (Category 3 at 215.5 km/133.9 miles)

There were also three intermediate sprints in Mersch (at 35 km/21.7 miles), Spa (144 km/89.5 miles), and Aubel (176.5 km/109.7 miles).

In this stage, the breakaway featured the following five riders:

- José Luis Arrieta, Spain, AG2R Prévoyance
- Unai Extebarria, Venezuela, Euskaltel–Euskadi
- Christophe Laurent, France, Agritubel
- Jérôme Pineau, France, Bouygues Télécom
- Jens Voigt, Germany, Team CSC

Jérôme Pineau concentrated mainly on finishing first in the climbs, which won him the polka dot jersey. Towards the end, most riders were expecting Jens Voigt to try to get away on his own, but he never did. Instead, Christophe Laurent twice got away, but was caught by the chasing four. Then, José Luis Arrieta got away from the others, but during the last climb of the day, the Cauberg, the peloton passed by him. The most important event of this stage was the loss of Alejandro Valverde, the leader in the ProTour, who broke his collarbone. Erik Dekker and Fred Rodriguez also crashed, and both suffered serious injuries.

The Cauberg, with its top just before the red banner 1 km (0.62 mi) from the finish line, was the ideal point for Matthias Kessler to get away from the peloton and take the victory. Sprinters Thor Hushovd and Robbie McEwen did not get over the Cauberg in the first part of the peloton. Therefore, Tom Boonen took the leads in both the general classification and the points classification, even though he finished fourth.

Stage 3 result

Rank	Rider	Team	Time
1	Matthias Kessler (GER)	T-Mobile Team	4h 57' 54"
2	Michael Rogers (AUS)	T-Mobile Team	+ 5"
3	Daniele Bennati (ITA)	Lampre–Fondital	s.t.
4	Tom Boonen (BEL)	Quick-Step–Innergetic	s.t.
5	Erik Zabel (GER)	Team Milram	s.t.
6	Luca Paolini (ITA)	Liquigas	s.t.
7	Óscar Freire (ESP)	Rabobank	s.t.
8	Eddy Mazzoleni (ITA)	T-Mobile Team	s.t.
9	Georg Totschnig (AUT)	Gerolsteiner	s.t.
10	Fabian Wegmann (GER)	Gerolsteiner	s.t.

General classification after stage 3

Rank	Rider	Team	Time
1	Tom Boonen (BEL)	Quick-Step–Innergetic	14h 52' 23"
2	Michael Rogers (AUS)	T-Mobile Team	+ 1"
3	George Hincapie (USA)	Discovery Channel	+ 5"
4	Thor Hushovd (NOR)	Crédit Agricole	+ 10"
5	Paolo Savoldelli (ITA)	Discovery Channel	+ 15"
6	Daniele Bennati (ITA)	Lampre–Fondital	s.t.
7	Floyd Landis (USA)	Phonak	+ 16"
8	Vladimir Karpets (RUS)	Caisse d'Epargne–Illes Balears	+ 17"
9	Serhiy Honchar (UKR)	T-Mobile Team	s.t.
10	Matthias Kessler (GER)	T-Mobile Team	s.t.

Note: Daniele Bennati will be in the green jersey, as a rider cannot wear two leading jerseys at the same time.

== Stage 4 ==
5 July 2006 — Huy (Belgium) to Saint-Quentin, 207 km (128.6 mi)

Stage 4 was another sprinter's stage. The 207.0 km (128.6 mi) long stage had only two categorized climbs, both in the first 60 km (37 mi). It started in Huy, Belgium and ended in Saint-Quentin in the northern part of France.

The two categorized climbs were Cote de Peu d'Eau (Category 3 at 13.0 km/8.1 miles) and Cote de Falaen (Category 4, 57.5 km/35.7 miles).

There were also three intermediate sprints in Beaumont (at 103.0 km/64.0 miles), Sains-du-Nord (135.5 km/84.2 miles) and Bernot (188.0 km/116.8 miles).

In this stage, the breakaway took place about 20 km (12 mi) into the stage and featured the following five riders:

- Cedric Coutouly, France, AG2R Prévoyance
- Laurent Lefèvre, France, Bouygues Télécom
- Egoi Martínez, Spain, Discovery Channel
- Christophe Mengin, France, Française des Jeux
- Bradley Wiggins, United Kingdom, Cofidis

The peloton slowly caught them in the late going, with the lead group breaking up at about 10 km (6.2 mi) to the finish, and finally being caught within 2 km (1.2 mi) of the finish line.

Robbie McEwen won his second stage in a quick sprint. Just before the finish line, Julian Dean crashed in the middle of the peloton but did not take anyone else down. Thor Hushovd, who finished fourth, was disqualified for irregularities during sprinting and set back to last position of the group he finished in, which was position 148. This cost him 26 points for the green jersey which could prove vital in the end.

In the top 10 of the general classification, two new names appear, Robbie McEwen because of the 20-second bonus he received for finishing first, and Egoi Martínez, who won all three intermediate sprints and so moved up 18 seconds and into fifth position.

Stage 4 result

Rank	Rider	Team	Time
1	Robbie McEwen (AUS)	Davitamon–Lotto	4h 59' 50"
2	Isaac Gálvez (ESP)	Caisse d'Epargne–Illes Balears	s.t.
3	Óscar Freire (ESP)	Rabobank	s.t.
4	Tom Boonen (BEL)	Quick-Step–Innergetic	s.t.
5	David Kopp (GER)	Gerolsteiner	s.t.
6	Daniele Bennati (ITA)	Lampre–Fondital	s.t.
7	Francisco Ventoso (ESP)	Saunier Duval–Prodir	s.t.
8	Michael Albasini (SUI)	Liquigas	s.t.
9	Bernhard Eisel (AUT)	Française des Jeux	s.t.
10	Jimmy Casper (FRA)	Cofidis	s.t.

General classification after stage 4

Rank	Rider	Team	Time
1	Tom Boonen (BEL)	Quick-Step–Innergetic	19h 52' 13"
2	Michael Rogers (AUS)	T-Mobile Team	+ 1"
3	George Hincapie (USA)	Discovery Channel	+ 5"
4	Thor Hushovd (NOR)	Crédit Agricole	+ 7"
5	Egoi Martínez (ESP)	Discovery Channel	+ 10"
6	Robbie McEwen (AUS)	Davitamon–Lotto	+ 12"
7	Paolo Savoldelli (ITA)	Discovery Channel	+ 15"
8	Daniele Bennati (ITA)	Lampre–Fondital	s.t.
9	Floyd Landis (USA)	Phonak	+ 16"
10	Vladimir Karpets (RUS)	Caisse d'Epargne–Illes Balears	+ 17"

== Stage 5 ==
6 July 2006 — Beauvais to Caen, 225 km (139.8 mi)

Stage 5 is a long (225.0 km/139.8 mile) sprinters stage with four categorized climbs (all Category 4) and the usual three intermediate sprints. The stage started in Beauvais and ended in Caen in northern France (in the Normandy region).

The following were the categorized climbs:

- Mont des Fourches (Category 4 at 10.5 km/6.5 miles)
- Côte du Buquet (Category 4 at 109.0 km/67.7 miles)
- Côte de Saint-Grégoire-du-Vièvre (Category 4 at 134.5 km/83.5 miles)
- Côte du Boulay (Category 4 at 159.0 km/98.8 miles).

The three intermediate sprints were located in Les Andelys (at 66.5 km/41.3 miles), Saint-Georges-du-Vièvre (at 140.5 km/87.3 miles) and Pont-L'Evêque (at 175.0 km/108.7 miles).

Early in this stage, eight riders tried to get away from the peloton:

- Stéphane Augé, France, Cofidis
- Bram de Groot, Netherlands, Rabobank
- Samuel Dumoulin, France, AG2R Prévoyance
- Sebastian Lang, Germany, Gerolsteiner
- Manuel Quinziato, Italy, Liquigas
- Daniele Righi, Italy, Lampre–Fondital
- Björn Schröder, Germany, Team Milram
- Bram Tankink, Netherlands, Quick-Step–Innergetic

but the peloton did not let them get away very far until Dumoulin and Schröder broke away from the group. The other six were caught and Dumoulin and Schröder were allowed to take a lead of up to 12'50" over the peloton. Meanwhile, the sprinters in the peloton did not want to sprint for the 2 points left at the three intermediate sprints, so every time Johan Van Summeren attacked just a few kilometers before every sprint to take the points. Jérôme Pineau also was very active today, as he did the same thing as Van Summeren but then on the climbs, taking points to maintain his lead in the standings for the polka dot jersey.

In the end, Dumoulin and Schröder were caught about 2 kilometres from the finish line as Quick-Step–Innergetic, Davitamon–Lotto and Crédit Agricole had driven hard to close the gap. In the sprint, surprisingly Óscar Freire popped up out of nowhere to take the stage win. Tom Boonen finished second, took 12 bonus seconds and thereby insured that he was going to be wearing the yellow jersey at least one more day.

Stage 5 result

Rank	Rider	Team	Time
1	Óscar Freire (ESP)	Rabobank	5h 18' 50"
2	Tom Boonen (BEL)	Quick-Step–Innergetic	s.t.
3	Iñaki Isasi (ESP)	Euskaltel–Euskadi	s.t.
4	David Kopp (GER)	Gerolsteiner	s.t.
5	Robbie McEwen (AUS)	Davitamon–Lotto	s.t.
6	Alessandro Ballan (ITA)	Lampre–Fondital	s.t.
7	Thor Hushovd (NOR)	Crédit Agricole	s.t.
8	Francisco Ventoso (ESP)	Saunier Duval–Prodir	s.t.
9	Erik Zabel (GER)	Team Milram	s.t.
10	Bernhard Eisel (AUT)	Française des Jeux	s.t.

General classification after stage 5

Rank	Rider	Team	Time
1	Tom Boonen (BEL)	Quick-Step–Innergetic	25h 10' 51"
2	Michael Rogers (AUS)	T-Mobile Team	+ 13"
3	Óscar Freire (ESP)	Rabobank	+ 17"
4	George Hincapie (USA)	Discovery Channel	s.t.
5	Thor Hushovd (NOR)	Crédit Agricole	+ 19"
6	Robbie McEwen (AUS)	Davitamon–Lotto	+ 24"
7	Paolo Savoldelli (ITA)	Discovery Channel	+ 27"
8	Floyd Landis (USA)	Phonak	+ 28"
9	Vladimir Karpets (RUS)	Caisse d'Epargne–Illes Balears	+ 29"
10	Serhiy Honchar (UKR)	T-Mobile Team	s.t.

== Stage 6 ==
7 July 2006 — Lisieux to Vitré, 189 km (117.4 mi)

This somewhat shorter stage (189.0 km/117.4 miles) was also a sprinters' stage, with only one categorized climb: the Côte de la Hunière (Category 3 at 27.5 km/17.1 miles).

The three intermediate sprints were located in Villedieu-lès-Bailleul (at 46.0 km/28.6 miles), Chantrigné (at 116.5 km/72.3 miles) and Juvigné (162.5 km/101.0 miles).

In the beginning of the stage, many riders were trying to break away from the peloton to be part of the daily group of leaders, but in contrast to most earlier stages, it took a long time before finally a group got away from the peloton and was allowed to gain some time and distance. After the only categorized climb of the day, it's Giuseppe Guerini and David López who are just riding a few seconds in front of the peloton, followed by Jérôme Pineau, the holder of the polka dot jersey who successfully tried to enhance his lead in the king of the mountains classification. But the two leaders don't get away and at the first intermediate sprint in Villedieu-lès-Bailleul, new names pass the line first. Most important to remember is Benoît Vaugrenard winning the sprint and therefore taking 6 bonus seconds which move him past Markus Fothen in the classification for best young rider.

After that a very large group of 17 riders forms who manage to ride away almost 2 minutes in front of the peloton, the most important riders in this group are — Tom Boonen, wearing the yellow jersey, Pavel Padrnos, Antonio Flecha, Axel Merckx, Thor Hushovd, Patrick Sinkewitz and Philippe Gilbert. However, the peloton does not want to let them go, mainly influenced by the teams Davitamon–Lotto and Discovery Channel. Three less important riders manage to break away from the leading group and when the peloton catches the other 14, they decide to let the three go. Those three are Anthony Geslin, Florent Brard the current French national champion, and Magnus Bäckstedt. They get caught just four kilometers before the finish line and so the sprinters can have another go at the stage victory. Robbie McEwen wins the sprint by a big margin after excellent work by his teammate Gert Steegmans. Robbie takes his third stage win in this tour and his eleventh overall.

In the standings, Tom Boonen remains in yellow but is expected to lose it the next day when there is an individual time trial, Robbie McEwen enlarges the gap between him and the other sprinters in the standings for the green jersey. He will probably be wearing that jersey for another two days, just like Jérôme Pineau is not likely to lose the polka dot jersey any day soon since not many hills or mountains are to be overcome the next few days. Benoît Vaugrenard is now leader of the young rider classification, but will have to be faster than Markus Fothen and the other youngsters in the time trial as he only has a small time advantage over most opponents. Anthony Geslin wins the combativity-trophy for the day and Discovery Channel remains in the lead of the team classification.

Stage 6 result

Rank	Rider	Team	Time
1	Robbie McEwen (AUS)	Davitamon–Lotto	4h 10' 17"
2	Daniele Bennati (ITA)	Lampre–Fondital	s.t.
3	Tom Boonen (BEL)	Quick-Step–Innergetic	s.t.
4	Bernhard Eisel (AUT)	Française des Jeux	s.t.
5	Thor Hushovd (NOR)	Crédit Agricole	s.t.
6	Óscar Freire (ESP)	Rabobank	s.t.
7	Erik Zabel (GER)	Team Milram	s.t.
8	Luca Paolini (ITA)	Liquigas	s.t.
9	Gert Steegmans (BEL)	Davitamon–Lotto	s.t.
10	Iñaki Isasi (ESP)	Euskaltel–Euskadi	s.t.

General classification after stage 6

Rank	Rider	Team	Time
1	Tom Boonen (BEL)	Quick-Step–Innergetic	29h 21' 00"
2	Robbie McEwen (AUS)	Davitamon–Lotto	+ 12"
3	Michael Rogers (AUS)	T-Mobile Team	+ 21"
4	Óscar Freire (ESP)	Rabobank	+ 25"
5	George Hincapie (USA)	Discovery Channel	s.t.
6	Thor Hushovd (NOR)	Crédit Agricole	+ 27"
7	Paolo Savoldelli (ITA)	Discovery Channel	+ 35"
8	Floyd Landis (USA)	Phonak	+ 36"
9	Vladimir Karpets (RUS)	Caisse d'Epargne–Illes Balears	+ 37"
10	Serhiy Honchar (UKR)	T-Mobile Team	s.t

== Stage 7 ==
8 July 2006 — Saint-Grégoire to Rennes, 52 km (32.3 mi) (ITT)

The first time trial took place in Brittany. It was a flat stage with no major climbs. The stage was 52.0 km (32.3 mi) long.

Due to the doping scandal a number of riders did not start in the tour, among those riders were the biggest favorites to win the tour, Jan Ullrich, Ivan Basso and Alexander Vinokourov. With those riders not starting, the 2006 Tour de France did not have real favorites and opinions were hugely divided over who was going to win the tour. Stage 7, an individual time trial, was going to be the first real test to see who was up to the task and who wasn't.

The T-Mobile Team finished with 6 riders in the top 16 including Serhiy Honchar, a Ukrainian time trial specialist, taking first place in the stage. Other positive results came from Floyd Landis, who finished second and Cadel Evans the Australian climber who was placed in ninth position in the general standings. Time-trial favorite David Zabriskie finished out of the top 10 in 13th. The Discovery Channel Pro Cycling Team with George Hincapie, Paolo Savoldelli, Yaroslav Popovych and José Azevedo all finished lower than expected. Additionally, Levi Leipheimer finished more than 6 minutes behind Honchar. Bobby Julich crashed and injured his wrist and thigh severely before being taken away in an ambulance. Despite Leipheimer's finish, Gerolsteiner found success with both Sebastian Lang and Markus Fothen finishing in the top 10. This enabled Fothen to take back the leading position in the young rider classification and gives him a considerable lead over his opponents. Swede Gustav Larsson and Dutchman Joost Posthuma also achieved a top 10 finish in the time trial.

Looking at the general classification after stage 7, T-Mobile Team has 4 riders in the top 10 which looks promising going into the mountains. However the other major contenders for the victory in this tour seem to be Floyd Landis, Cadel Evans and Denis Menchov. It is unsure what to expect exactly from Vladimir Karpets, Markus Fothen and David Zabriskie but they have possibilities left too. Paolo Savoldelli and George Hincapie are not out of it yet also, being behind respectively 2'10" and 2'30", with a few other possible contenders between them in the standings as there are Carlos Sastre, Eddy Mazzoleni and French favorite Christophe Moreau. In conclusion, the tour is still wide open since not many people expect Serhiy Honchar to hold on to the jersey until Paris.

The green and polka dot jersey stay with Robbie McEwen and Jérôme Pineau respectively, while the top team is now T-Mobile Team.

Stage 7 result

Rank	Rider	Team	Time
1	Serhiy Honchar (UKR)	T-Mobile Team	1h 01' 43"
2	Floyd Landis (USA)	Phonak	+ 1' 01"
3	Sebastian Lang (GER)	Gerolsteiner	+ 1' 04"
4	Michael Rogers (AUS)	T-Mobile Team	+ 1' 24"
5	Gustav Larsson (SWE)	Française des Jeux	+ 1' 34"
6	Patrik Sinkewitz (GER)	T-Mobile Team	+ 1' 39"
7	Markus Fothen (GER)	Gerolsteiner	+ 1' 42"
8	Andreas Klöden (GER)	T-Mobile Team	+ 1' 43"
9	Denis Menchov (RUS)	Rabobank	+ 1' 44"
10	Joost Posthuma (NED)	Rabobank	+ 1' 45"

General classification after stage 7

Rank	Rider	Team	Time
1	Serhiy Honchar (UKR)	T-Mobile Team	30h 23' 20"
2	Floyd Landis (USA)	Phonak	+ 1' 00"
3	Michael Rogers (AUS)	T-Mobile Team	+ 1' 08"
4	Patrik Sinkewitz (GER)	T-Mobile Team	+ 1' 45"
5	Markus Fothen (GER)	Gerolsteiner	+ 1' 50"
6	Andreas Klöden (GER)	T-Mobile Team	s.t.
7	Vladimir Karpets (RUS)	Caisse d'Epargne–Illes Balears	+ 1' 52"
8	Cadel Evans (AUS)	Davitamon–Lotto	s.t.
9	Denis Menchov (RUS)	Rabobank	+ 2' 00"
10	David Zabriskie (USA)	Team CSC	+ 2' 03"

== Stage 8 ==
9 July 2006 — Saint-Méen-le-Grand to Lorient, 181 km (112.5 mi)

Stage 8 (181.0 km/112.5 miles in length) had a somewhat rolling profile, with four categorized climbs and three intermediate sprints. The weather was also a factor with the ocean winds blowing. The four climbs were as follows:

- Côte de Mûr-de-Bretagne (Category 3 at 75.0 km/46.6 miles)
- Côte de Saint-Mayeux (Category 4 at 78.5 km/48.8 miles)
- Côte de Gouarec (Category 4 at 94.0 km/58.4 miles)
- Côte de Ty Marrec (Category 4 at 138.5 km/86.0 miles)

The three intermediate sprints were located in Plessala (at 38.0 km/23.6 miles), Locmalo (112.5 km/69.9 miles) and Plouay (142.0 km/88.2 miles).

In Stage 8, a group of five riders formed after about 50 kilometres (31 mi), consisting of the following riders:

- Mario Aerts, Belgium, Davitamon–Lotto
- Sylvain Calzati, France, AG2R Prévoyance
- Kjell Carlström, Finland, Liquigas
- Matthias Kessler, Germany, T-Mobile Team
- David Zabriskie, United States, Team CSC

with Patrice Halgand, France, Crédit Agricole making the jump from the peloton to the leading group on his own before the gap became too big which made the final number of escapees in the breakaway group of this stage six.

The peloton, mainly under influence of Phonak, did not let the lead grow too much, since Zabriskie and Kessler were both standing 2'03" behind the leader, or just 1'03 behind Phonak's leader, Floyd Landis. As the race progressed and the lead of the leaders was brought back from its maximum of 7'30 to about 3'30, the riders from the Phonak team stopped chasing as it was the sprinter's teams to start chasing and close the final gap. However, most teams were probably afraid of Davitamon–Lotto's Robbie McEwen as he had impressively won three sprinters' stages in this tour already, so there were no chasing riders from Quick-Step–Innergetic (for Tom Boonen), no riders from Lampre–Fondital (for Daniele Bennati) and no riders also for Davitamon–Lotto as they already had Mario Aerts in the lead. The only team that kept chasing was Française des Jeux, because they were the least successful French team so far in the tour and the lead group featured two riders from other French teams.

Meanwhile, in the lead group, Sylvain Calzati had stormed away from the other five escapees with about 30 kilometres (19 mi) to go, only to be chased after somewhat later by Patrice Halgand and Kjell Carlström. The other three riders mainly looked at each other and did not believe they could stay out of the peloton's grip. However, the peloton would catch up with those three non-believers, but the other three were not to be caught before the finish line. Sylvain Calzati proved to be too strong for the other two as they coöperated to get back to him but never saw him again before Lorient, instead the gap only became bigger. In the end Sylvain Calzati scored his most beautiful professional victory of his career as he came over the finish line more than two minutes ahead of Carlström and Halgand, who both just ended a few seconds before the peloton. In the peloton, Robbie McEwen again won the sprint, enlarging his lead in the standings for the green jersey over the other sprinters.

In the top 10 of the general standings and best young rider classification, nothing changed as all the main contenders finished together in the peloton. The polka dot jersey also remained with Jérôme Pineau.

The intermediate sprints of this stage did not have any major influence on the classification for the best sprinter, but David Zabriskie, who was part of the breakaway group, took 10 bonus seconds and so moved into ninth position overall and reduced his deficit to 1'53" from the leader Serhiy Honchar.

Sylvain Calzati did not only win the stage, he also came through first on top of all classified climbs of the day. He scored 4 points for de Mûr-de-Bretagne and 3 points for the three other côtes which made him end with 13 points and this moved him into fourth position in the polka dot jersey standings.

Stage 8 result

Rank	Rider	Team	Time
1	Sylvain Calzati (FRA)	AG2R Prévoyance	4h 13' 18"
2	Kjell Carlström (FIN)	Liquigas	+ 2' 05"
3	Patrice Halgand (FRA)	Crédit Agricole	s.t.
4	Robbie McEwen (AUS)	Davitamon–Lotto	+ 2' 15"
5	Daniele Bennati (ITA)	Lampre–Fondital	s.t.
6	Erik Zabel (GER)	Team Milram	s.t.
7	Bernhard Eisel (AUT)	Française des Jeux	s.t.
8	Luca Paolini (ITA)	Liquigas	s.t.
9	Tom Boonen (BEL)	Quick-Step–Innergetic	s.t.
10	David Kopp (GER)	Gerolsteiner	s.t.

General classification after stage 8

Rank	Rider	Team	Time
1	Serhiy Honchar (UKR)	T-Mobile Team	34h 38' 53"
2	Floyd Landis (USA)	Phonak	+ 1' 00"
3	Michael Rogers (AUS)	T-Mobile Team	+ 1' 08"
4	Patrik Sinkewitz (GER)	T-Mobile Team	+ 1' 45"
5	Markus Fothen (GER)	Gerolsteiner	+ 1' 50"
6	Andreas Klöden (GER)	T-Mobile Team	s.t.
7	Vladimir Karpets (RUS)	Caisse d'Epargne–Illes Balears	+ 1' 52"
8	Cadel Evans (AUS)	Davitamon–Lotto	s.t.
9	David Zabriskie (USA)	Team CSC	+ 1' 53"
10	Denis Menchov (RUS)	Rabobank	+ 2' 00"

== Rest Day ==
10 July 2006 — Bordeaux

All the riders had flown from Lorient to Bordeaux on the evening of July 9 and now spent their rest day in Bordeaux or some place nearby. Important news on this day came from Floyd Landis, as he announced that he seriously injured his hip, during training in 2003, which still hinders him while riding due to a bad position on the bike and also causes sleeping problems. He has decided to undergo surgery to receive an artificial hip after the Tour which would hopefully relieve him of these problems. However this also means that it is very well possible that he will never be able to ride at a professional level again. As a conclusion he mentions this is an extra motivation for him to try to win this Tour. Floyd's teammate Axel Merckx on this day signed a new contract with Phonak for one extra season. Merckx, who is now 33 years old, announced that the 2007 season will be his last season, as he wants to spend a lot more time with his family thereafter. The Phonak team will be called iShares next season.

== Stage 9 ==
11 July 2006 — Bordeaux to Dax, 169.5 km (105.3 mi)

The peloton got a completely flat stage today, which was also relatively short (169.5 km/105.3 miles in length). This stage looked to be one of the last chances for the sprinters as the next day they were moving into the Pyrenees.

The peloton did not have to pass by any categorized climbs during this stage but instead there were three intermediate sprints which were located at Le Barp (at 25.5 km/15.8 miles), Parentis-en-Born (72 km/44.7 miles) and Saint-Girons (128.0 km/79.5 miles).

Like many of the preceding stages, an early break away was allowed to escape, but kept within reach of the sprinter teams. In this stage, the break away consisted of Christian Knees (Team Milram) who initiated the break away, and Walter Bénéteau (Bouygues Télécom) and Stéphane Augé (Cofidis) who joined soon after. The break away was eliminated with four kilometers to go, and so was an attack from Stuart O'Grady (Team CSC) two kilometers later. The final sprint was won by Óscar Freire (Rabobank), after an impressive manoeuvre by Robbie McEwen (Davitamon–Lotto).

Important detail at the finish line was that many riders lost a few seconds because the peloton broke into groups during the sprint. Important riders who lost 13" — Matthias Kessler, Denis Menchov and Markus Fothen.

Stage 9 result

Rank	Rider	Team	Time
1	Óscar Freire (ESP)	Rabobank	3h 35' 24"
2	Robbie McEwen (AUS)	Davitamon–Lotto	s.t.
3	Erik Zabel (GER)	Team Milram	s.t.
4	Tom Boonen (BEL)	Quick-Step–Innergetic	s.t.
5	Cristian Moreni (ITA)	Cofidis	s.t.
6	Isaac Gálvez (ESP)	Caisse d'Epargne–Illes Balears	s.t.
7	Francisco Ventoso (ESP)	Saunier Duval–Prodir	s.t.
8	Luca Paolini (ITA)	Liquigas	s.t.
9	David Kopp (GER)	Gerolsteiner	s.t.
10	Thor Hushovd (NOR)	Crédit Agricole	s.t.

General classification after stage 9

Rank	Rider	Team	Time
1	Serhiy Honchar (UKR)	T-Mobile Team	38h 14' 17"
2	Floyd Landis (USA)	Phonak	+ 1' 00"
3	Michael Rogers (AUS)	T-Mobile Team	+ 1' 08"
4	Patrik Sinkewitz (GER)	T-Mobile Team	+ 1' 45"
5	Andreas Klöden (GER)	T-Mobile Team	+ 1' 50"
6	Vladimir Karpets (RUS)	Caisse d'Epargne–Illes Balears	+ 1' 52"
7	Cadel Evans (AUS)	Davitamon–Lotto	s.t.
8	David Zabriskie (USA)	Team CSC	+ 1' 53"
9	Markus Fothen (GER)	Gerolsteiner	+ 2' 03"
10	Christophe Moreau (FRA)	AG2R Prévoyance	+ 2' 07"

== Stage 10 ==
12 July 2006 — Cambo-les-Bains to Pau, 190.5 km (118.4 mi)

Stage 10 (190.5 km/118.3 miles) enters the Pyrenees and is the first mountain stage. It is considered an in-between stage, as it features two major mountains, but the finish line lies more than 40 kilometres beyond the last climb of the day. Expected is that the winner of the stage will not be a climber, maybe even a sprinter.

It has three categorized climbs:

- Col d'Osquich (Category 3 at 50 km/31.1 miles)
- Col du Soudet (Hors catégorie (highest level) at 101.5 km/63.0 miles)
- Col de Marie Blanque (Category 1 at 148 km/91.9 miles)

Being a mountain stage, it has only two intermediate sprints instead of the regular three: at Larceveau (at 37.5 km/23.3 miles) and Laguinge (at 74.5 km/46.3 miles)

During the first 40 kilometres, no riders managed to get away from the peloton. At the sprint in Larceveau a few riders sprinted for the points and that group grew to 15 riders who were allowed to break away from the peloton:

- Daniele Bennati, Italy, Lampre–Fondital
- Carlos Da Cruz, France, Française des Jeux
- Cyril Dessel, France, AG2R Prévoyance
- Thor Hushovd, Norway, Crédit Agricole
- Iñaki Isasi, Spain, Euskaltel–Euskadi
- Iñigo Landaluze, Spain, Euskaltel–Euskadi
- Juan Miguel Mercado, Spain, Agritubel
- Cristian Moreni, Italy, Cofidis
- Joost Posthuma, Netherlands, Rabobank
- Manuel Quinziato, Italy, Liquigas
- Christophe Rinero, Italy, Saunier Duval–Prodir
- Mathieu Sprick, France, Bouygues Télécom
- Gert Steegmans, Belgium, Davitamon–Lotto
- Cédric Vasseur, France, Quick-Step–Innergetic
- Jens Voigt, Germany, Team CSC

Hushovd and Steegmans dropped on the Col d'Osquich, then the rest of the group got split into lots of different smaller groups during the climb of the Col de Soudet with Cyril Dessel and Juan Miguel Mercado passing the top of the climb first. During the descent Landaluze, Rinero, Isasi, Vasseur and Moreni managed to return. The peloton was about 10 minutes behind at that time, as T-Mobile Team had decided they were not going to defend their yellow jersey and leave the work for the next stages for some other team.

During the climb of the Col de Marie-Blanque, Dessel and Mercado again proved to be the strongest with Dessel coming through first as he had done on the two earlier climbs already: the polka dot jersey was his. Landaluze came closest to coming back as he was about 50 meters behind at some point during the descent, but the two leaders worked together not to let that happen. However, about 15 kilometres before the finish line, Mercado was hoping to make a deal with Dessel: since Dessel was going to be winning the yellow and polka dot jersey, he was hoping to be getting the stage win from Dessel in return for helping him. However Dessel wanted it all, so Mercado stopped helping and Dessel had to maintain the lead by himself to prevent Landaluze from coming back. In the end, Mercado sprinted past Dessel about 300 metres from the finish and won the stage. Landaluze finished third about a minute behind. Moreni, Rinero, Isasi and Vasseur also managed to stay in front of the pelont, the others were caught.

Sprinters Erik Zabel and Daniele Bennati were able to stay in the peloton and therefore they took points in the competition for the green jersey as they sprinted for the eighth place behind the seven of fifteen escaped riders that were not caught. Bennati won the sprint and finished 7'23" behind Mercado and Dessel.

As a result of this stage, Cyril Dessel is now holding the yellow and polka dot jersey, Robbie McEwen is still in green and Markus Fothen is still in white. The lead team is now AG2R Prévoyance. Other important facts:

- Iban Mayo, the Basque climber, one of the riders expected to show something in the mountain stages, was one of the first to drop from the peloton and it is unsure what he is still capable of this tour.
- Michael Rasmussen is an odds-on favorite to be showing something during the next stage as he demonstrated his interest for the polka dot jersey by sprinting away from the peloton to get the last remaining points on the Col de Marie-Blanque.
- The tour lost two riders today, Laurent Brochard did not start and Jimmy Engoulvent gave up during the race.

Stage 10 result

Rank	Rider	Team	Time
1	Juan Miguel Mercado (ESP)	Agritubel	4h 49' 10"
2	Cyril Dessel (FRA)	AG2R Prévoyance	s.t.
3	Iñigo Landaluze (ESP)	Euskaltel–Euskadi	+ 56"
4	Cristian Moreni (ITA)	Cofidis	+ 2' 24"
5	Christophe Rinero (FRA)	Saunier Duval–Prodir	+ 2' 25"
6	Iñaki Isasi (ESP)	Euskaltel–Euskadi	+ 5' 03"
7	Cédric Vasseur (FRA)	Quick-Step–Innergetic	+ 5' 35"
8	Daniele Bennati (ITA)	Lampre–Fondital	+ 7' 23"
9	Erik Zabel (GER)	Team Milram	s.t.
10	Stefano Garzelli (ITA)	Liquigas	s.t.

General classification after stage 10

Rank	Rider	Team	Time
1	Cyril Dessel (FRA)	AG2R Prévoyance	43h 07' 05"
2	Juan Miguel Mercado (ESP)	Agritubel	+ 2' 34"
3	Serhiy Honchar (UKR)	T-Mobile Team	+ 3' 45"
4	Cristian Moreni (ITA)	Cofidis	+ 3' 51"
5	Floyd Landis (USA)	Phonak	+ 4' 45"
6	Michael Rogers (AUS)	T-Mobile Team	+ 4' 53"
7	Iñigo Landaluze (ESP)	Euskaltel–Euskadi	+ 5' 22"
8	Patrik Sinkewitz (GER)	T-Mobile Team	+ 5' 30"
9	Andreas Klöden (GER)	T-Mobile Team	+ 5' 35"
10	Vladimir Karpets (RUS)	Caisse d'Epargne–Illes Balears	+ 5' 37"

Note: Juan Miguel Mercado got to wear the polka dot jersey, as a rider cannot wear two leading jerseys at the same time.

== Stage 11 ==
13 July 2006 — Tarbes to Val d'Aran, Pla-de-Beret (Spain), 206.5 km (128.3 mi)

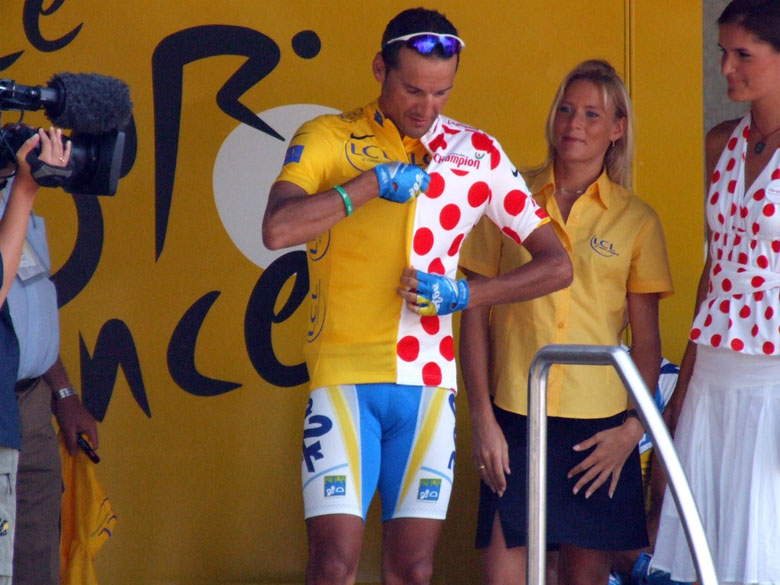
Dessel signs in and puts on his special double jersey at Tarbes in the 2006 Tour de France. Note: it was just a stunt from the sponsor. He was not allowed to wear it during the actual Stage where he had to wear the regular yellow jersey

Stage 11 is a mountain stage with five categorized climbs: the Col du Tourmalet (Hors catégorie) with an ascent of 7.7% over 18.4 km, the Col d'Aspin (Category 1) with an ascent of 5.2% over 12.3 km, the Col de Peyresourde (Category 1) with an ascent of 7.1% over 9.5 km, the Col du Portillon (Category 1) with an ascent of 8.4% over 7.9 km, and the Pla-de-Beret (Category 1 in Spain) with an ascent of 5.4% over 13.5 km. It begins at Tarbes at 325 m and ends at Val d'Aran at 1830 m.

In contrast to the previous stage, many fewer riders were interested in joining an early breakaway group as the stage featured over 60 kilometers of climbing. 17.5 kilometres into the stage, at the first sprint, there were still no riders who had escaped and so Robbie McEwen saw the possibility of going for it. He succeeded, but mainly because the other sprinters did not even challenge him; this means that they have probably given up for the points classification. It seems now that McEwen just needs to make it to Paris to win that green jersey.

Not much later, four riders did get away from the peloton. They included three Spaniards:

- Iker Camaño from Euskaltel–Euskadi,
- David de la Fuente from Saunier Duval–Prodir and
- Juan Antonio Flecha from Rabobank.

They left, together with Fabian Wegmann, the German from Gerolsteiner. All this happened before the first climb of the day, the Col du Tourmalet. On the Tourmalet, Wegmann and de la Fuente looked to be somewhat stronger than their two companions as they both sprinted to finish first on the top. De la Fuente won the sprint and so took the most points for the polka dot jersey, but also he won the Souvenir Jacques Goddet for coming through first on the top of the highest climb in the Pyrenees of this Tour which rendered him 5000 Euros. In the peloton, the team of AG2R Prévoyance maintained the tempo to keep the leaders within reasonable distance and thus protect their yellow jersey. Thomas Voeckler won the sprint against Michael Rasmussen for the remaining points on top of the Tourmalet and he kept going. Although the leaders were about 4 minutes ahead at that time, he thought it would be useful to go after them on his own. At first, his plan appeared to be correct, as he closed the gap during the descent and managed to climb faster than the leaders on the Col d'Aspin. Halfway up the Aspin he was only 2'30" behind, on top of the Aspin only 1'30". The four leaders stayed together on the Aspin, with now Wegmann sprinting faster than de la Fuente at the top. In the peloton, Rasmussen again took the points, but nothing more happened.

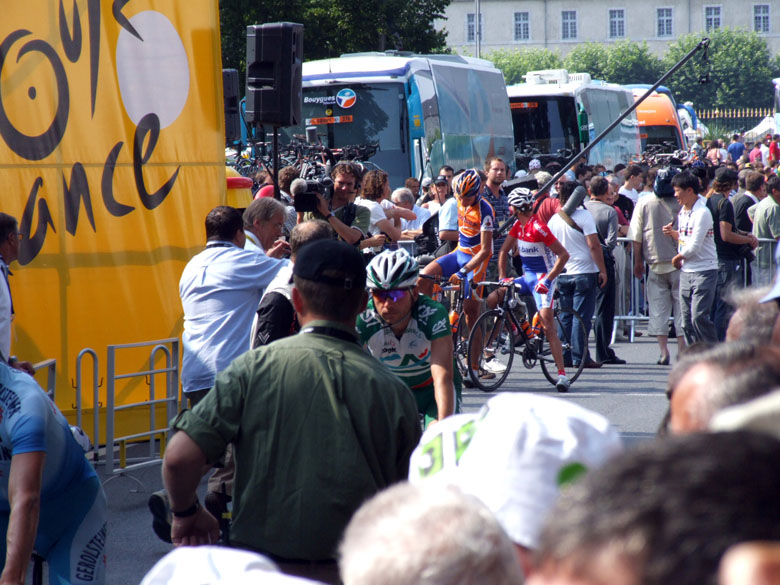
Stage 11 preparations at the 2006 Tour de France

During the climb of the Col de Peyresourde, Wegmann suddenly attacked and de la Fuente easily followed and beat him at the top for the points. Flecha had tried to follow them but came through more than 2 minutes behind at the top. Camano and Voeckler, whose plan had not been so smart after all, had used up most of their strengths and had been overtaken by the peloton before the top, who were 3 minutes behind at the top with yet again Rasmussen taking the points. Flecha was caught in the descent and on the Col du Portillon Wegmann was also caught; he had not been able to counter an attack from de la Fuente. On the Portillon something happened in the peloton also, because now suddenly it were the riders from T-Mobile Team who took over from the guys from AG2R Prévoyance and pumped up the pace. As a result, the peloton grew thinner and thinner, until only 19 riders remained:

- David Arroyo, Spain, Caisse d'Epargne–Illes Balears,
- José Azevedo, Portugal, Discovery Channel,
- Michael Boogerd, Netherlands, Rabobank,
- Damiano Cunego, Italy, Lampre–Fondital,
- Cadel Evans, Australia, Davitamon–Lotto,
- Markus Fothen, Germany, Gerolsteiner,
- Andreas Klöden, Germany, T-Mobile Team,
- Floyd Landis, United States, Phonak,
- Levi Leipheimer, United States, Gerolsteiner,
- Denis Menchov, Russia, Rabobank,
- Christophe Moreau, France, AG2R Prévoyance,
- Iván Parra, Colombia, Cofidis,
- Michael Rasmussen, Denmark, Rabobank,
- Michael Rogers, Australia, T-Mobile Team,
- Carlos Sastre, Spain, Team CSC,
- Fränk Schleck, Luxembourg, Team CSC,
- Gilberto Simoni, Italy, Saunier Duval–Prodir,
- Georg Totschnig, Austria, Gerolsteiner and
- Haimar Zubeldia, Spain, Euskaltel–Euskadi.

Cyril Dessel, the holder of the yellow jersey, was already about 2 minutes behind at that time. In the valley that came between the Col du Portillon and Pla-de-Beret, Arroyo and Cunego broke away from that elite group and closed the gap to de la Fuente, but they were all caught even before the climb towards Pla-de-Beret. On the last climb it was due to some extraordinary work by Michael Boogerd that the group kept getting smaller and smaller, with only five riders remaining in the end:

- Cadel Evans, Australia, Davitamon–Lotto,
- Floyd Landis, United States, Phonak,
- Levi Leipheimer, United States, Gerolsteiner,
- Denis Menchov, Russia, Rabobank and
- Carlos Sastre, Spain, Team CSC.

Evans and Sastre had to give in at the end and finished only 17 seconds behind the other three who sprinted for the victory at the top. Menchov outsprinted both Americans and won the stage, the third stage victory already for Rabobank during this Tour. In the General Classification, Floyd Landis became the leader and thus holder of the yellow jersey, as Cyril Dessel finished 4'45" behind, the exact time he was in front of Landis before the stage—but since Landis finished third, he won 8 bonus seconds and so he moved into the lead with an eight-second advantage.

Looking at the "lesser climbers", 37 riders just managed to avoid being disqualified for finishing late, as a group of 36 came in 44'20" behind Denis Menchov and Christophe Mengin even managed to finish 46'13" behind. The time limit was about 46'30". Amongst this group were sprinters Robbie McEwen, Thor Hushovd and Óscar Freire. Tom Boonen would have been delighted to see them finish late as he was in an earlier group. Being on time however, Robbie McEwen remains the leader of the points classification. Cyril Dessel not only lost his yellow jersey; he also lost the polka dot jersey, which went to David de la Fuente—who also got the combativity award for the day. Of the youngsters, only Markus Fothen was able to keep up with the pace during the day, he now has a big lead of exactly twelve minutes over the number two in the young rider classification and almost half an hour or more over all the other youngsters in this tour.

Other news in this stage:

- Discovery Channel completely broke down today, with their four best riders completely failing. José Azevedo was behind 4'10", Yaroslav Popovych 6'25", George Hincapie 21'23" and Paolo Savoldelli 23'04".
- A lot was expected from Andreas Klöden as his T-Mobile Team took the lead and determined the pace during the Col du Portillon. However he did not compete for the stage win and had to give in 1'31", a bit disappointing. This loss is small and leaves him sixth in the general classification, still with possibilities. T-Mobile also takes back the lead in the team classification and has led of 46 seconds over Gerolsteiner.
- Iban Mayo, struggling the day before already, had trouble getting up the climbs from the first few meters yet again. He was also extremely annoyed by the cameraman following him and filming his struggle, as that cameraman knew Mayo was probably going to give up and was waiting for him to do so. In the end Mayo was fined for 200 Swiss Francs for incorrect behaviour in front of the camera. He abandoned when the cameraman stopped following him.
- Other quitters on this day were Giovanni Lombardi and Wilfried Cretskens.
- Sébastien Joly, who had been the last man in the standings for a while before this stage, managed to pass Wim Vansevenant who is now the new lanterne rouge.

Stage 11 result

Rank	Rider	Team	Time
1	Denis Menchov (RUS)	Rabobank	6h 06' 25"
2	Levi Leipheimer (USA)	Gerolsteiner	s.t.
3	Floyd Landis (USA)	Phonak	s.t.
4	Cadel Evans (AUS)	Davitamon–Lotto	+ 17"
5	Carlos Sastre (ESP)	Team CSC	+ 17"
6	Michael Boogerd (NED)	Rabobank	+ 1' 04"
7	Haimar Zubeldia (ESP)	Euskaltel–Euskadi	+ 1' 31"
8	Fränk Schleck (LUX)	Team CSC	+ 1' 31"
9	Andreas Klöden (GER)	T-Mobile Team	+ 1' 31"
10	Christophe Moreau (FRA)	AG2R Prévoyance	+ 2' 29"

General Classification After Stage 11

Rank	Rider	Team	Time
1	Floyd Landis (USA)	Phonak	49h 18' 07"
2	Cyril Dessel (FRA)	AG2R Prévoyance	+ 8"
3	Denis Menchov (RUS)	Rabobank	+ 1' 01"
4	Cadel Evans (AUS)	Davitamon–Lotto	+ 1' 17"
5	Carlos Sastre (ESP)	Team CSC	+ 1' 52"
6	Andreas Klöden (GER)	T-Mobile Team	+ 2' 29"
7	Michael Rogers (AUS)	T-Mobile Team	+ 3' 22"
8	Juan Miguel Mercado (ESP)	Agritubel	+ 3' 33"
9	Christophe Moreau (FRA)	AG2R Prévoyance	+ 3' 44"
10	Markus Fothen (GER)	Gerolsteiner	+ 4' 17"
