= Souvenir Jacques Goddet =

Award in Tour de France

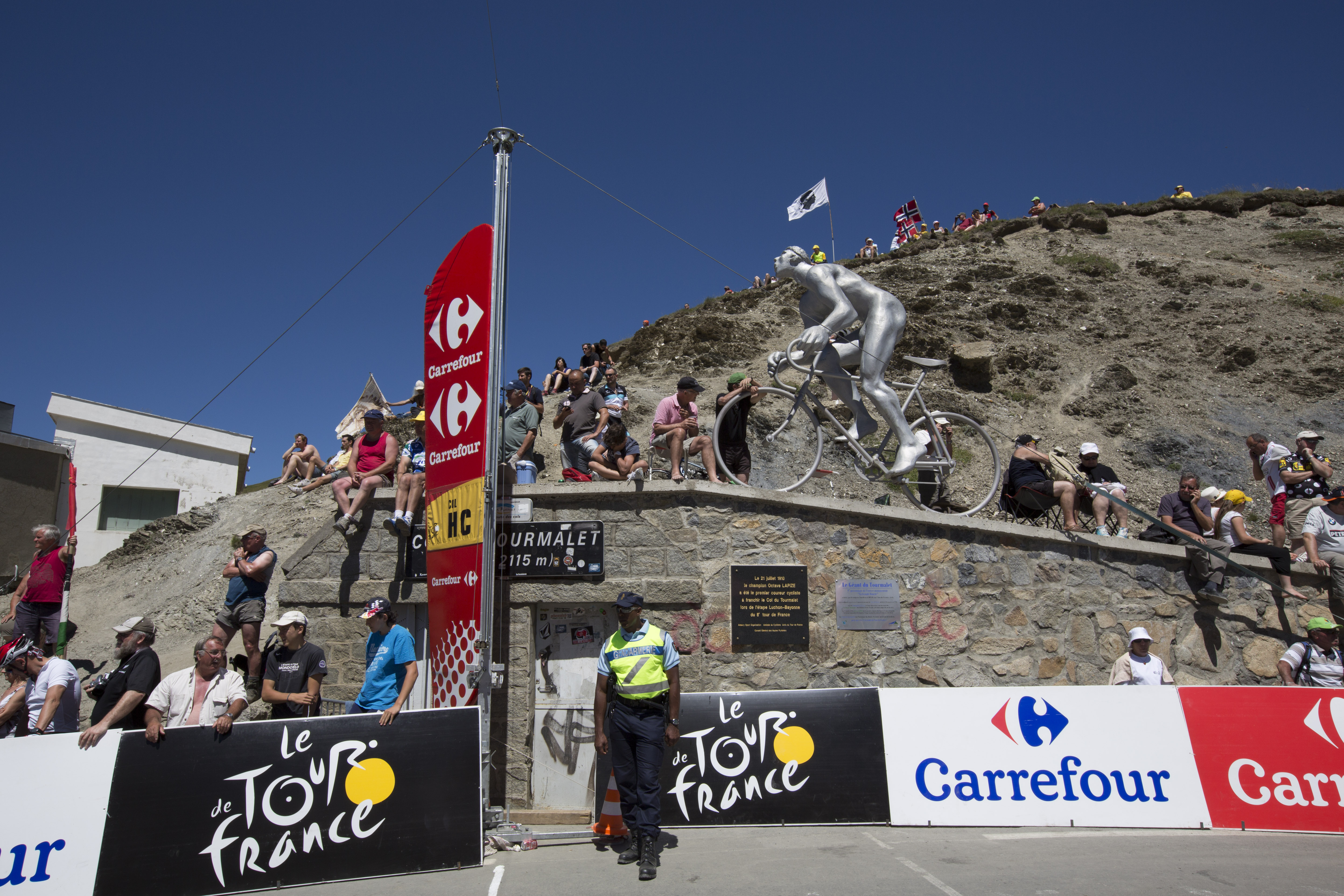
The marking point at the summit of the Col du Tourmalet on the 2012 Tour de France, won by Thomas Voeckler

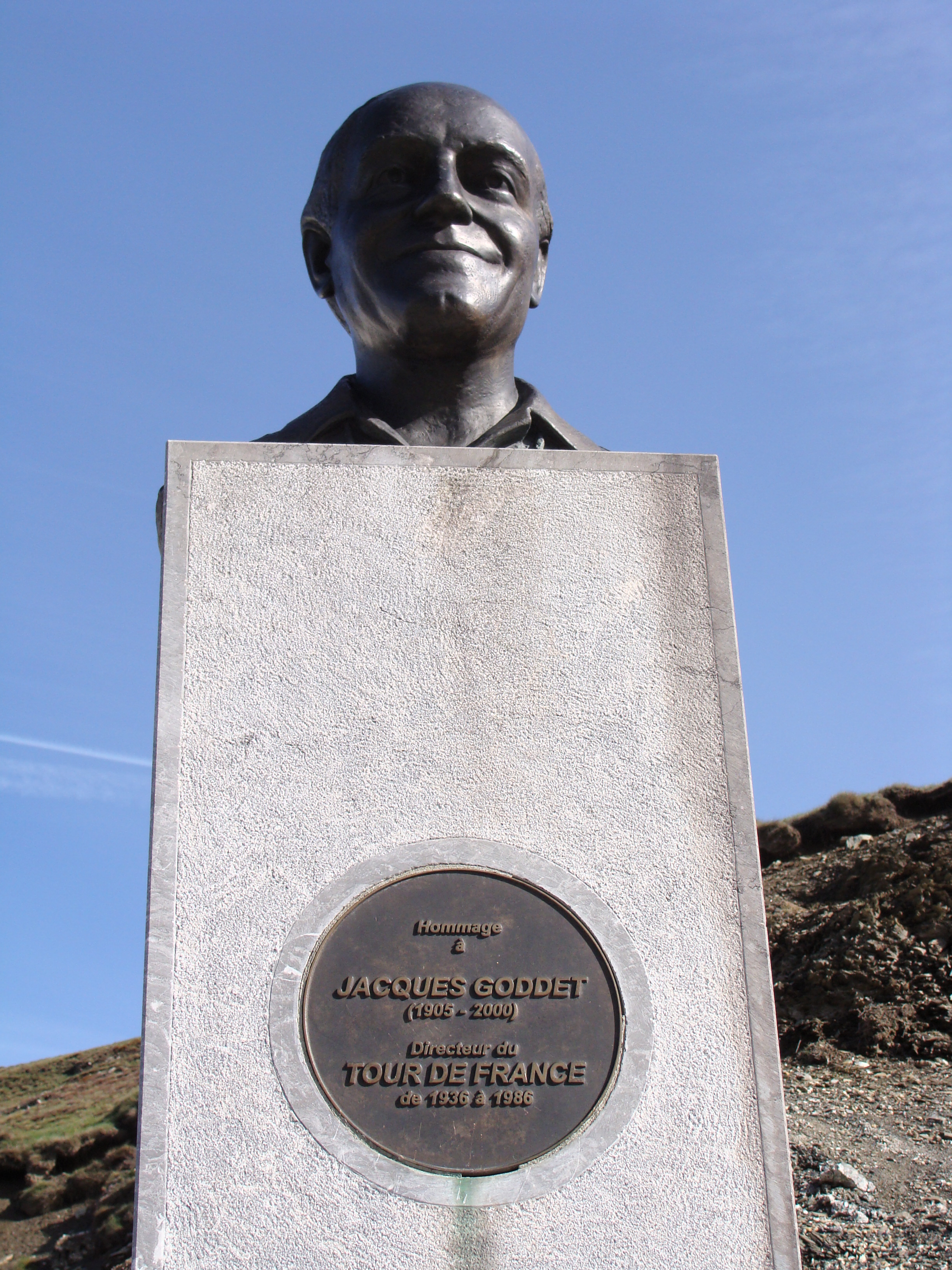
A memorial to Jacques Goddet stands at the summit of the Col du Tourmalet

The Souvenir Jacques Goddet is an award and cash prize in the Tour de France bicycle race that began in 2001. The Souvenir is named in honour of the iconic second Tour de France director and French sports journalist Jacques Goddet. It is awarded to the first rider to reach the summit of the 2,115 m (6,939 ft)-high Col du Tourmalet mountain pass in the Pyrenees, apart from 2002 Tour when the Col d'Aubisque was used and 2007 Tour where it was awarded in Port de Pailhères. A monument to Goddet was erected at the summit soon after his death in 2000. Since 2003, the cash prize is €5,000. In 2019, Thibaut Pinot became the first repeat winner of the prize.

== List of winners ==
List of Souvenir Jacques Goddet winners
Year	Stage	Location	Elevation	Winner	Nationality	Team	Cash prize	Ref
2001	14	Col du Tourmalet	2,115 m (6,939 ft)	Sven Montgomery	Switzerland	Française des Jeux	Ffr. 20,000	
2002	11	Col d'Aubisque	1,709 m (5,607 ft)	Laurent Jalabert	France	CSC–Tiscali		
2003	15	Col du Tourmalet	2,115 m (6,939 ft)	Sylvain Chavanel	France	Brioches La Boulangère	€5,000	
2004	not awarded							
2005	not awarded							
2006	11	Col du Tourmalet	2,115 m (6,939 ft)	David de la Fuente	Spain	Saunier Duval–Prodir	€5,000	
2007	14	Port de Pailhères	2,001 m (6,565 ft)	Rubén Pérez	Spain	Euskaltel–Euskadi	€5,000	
2008	10	Col du Tourmalet	2,115 m (6,939 ft)	Rémy Di Gregorio	France	Française des Jeux	€5,000	
2009	9	Col du Tourmalet	2,115 m (6,939 ft)	~~Franco Pellizotti~~ (Note: In March 2011, Franco Pellizotti's results were removed after the Court of Arbitration for Sport found his biological passport indicated irregular values.)	Italy	Liquigas	€5,000	
2010	16	Col du Tourmalet	2,115 m (6,939 ft)	Christophe Moreau	France	Caisse d'Epargne	€5,000	
2011	12	Col du Tourmalet	2,115 m (6,939 ft)	Jérémy Roy	France	FDJ	€5,000	
2012	16	Col du Tourmalet	2,115 m (6,939 ft)	Thomas Voeckler	France	Team Europcar	€5,000	
2013	not awarded							
2014	18	Col du Tourmalet	2,115 m (6,939 ft)	Blel Kadri	France	Ag2r–La Mondiale	€5,000	
2015	11	Col du Tourmalet	2,115 m (6,939 ft)	Rafał Majka	Poland	Tinkoff–Saxo	€5,000	
2016	8	Col du Tourmalet	2,115 m (6,939 ft)	Thibaut Pinot	France	FDJ	€5,000	
2017	not awarded							
2018	19	Col du Tourmalet	2,115 m (6,939 ft)	Julian Alaphilippe	France	Quick-Step Floors	€5,000	
2019	14	Col du Tourmalet	2,115 m (6,939 ft)	Thibaut Pinot	France	Groupama–FDJ	€5,000	
2020	not awarded							
2021	18	Col du Tourmalet	2,115 m (6,939 ft)	Pierre Latour	France	Team TotalEnergies	€5,000	
2022	not awarded							
2023	6	Col du Tourmalet	2,115 m (6,939 ft)	Tobias Halland Johannessen	Norway	Uno-X Pro Cycling Team	€5,000	
2024	14	Col du Tourmalet	2,115 m (6,939 ft)	Oier Lazkano	Spain	Movistar Team	€5,000	
2025	14	Col du Tourmalet	2,115 m (6,939 ft)	Lenny Martinez	France	Team Bahrain Victorious	€5,000	
2026	6	Col du Tourmalet	2,115 m (6,939 ft)	Tadej Pogačar	Slovenia	UAE Team Emirates XRG	€5,000	
