= Sylvain Calzati =

French cyclist

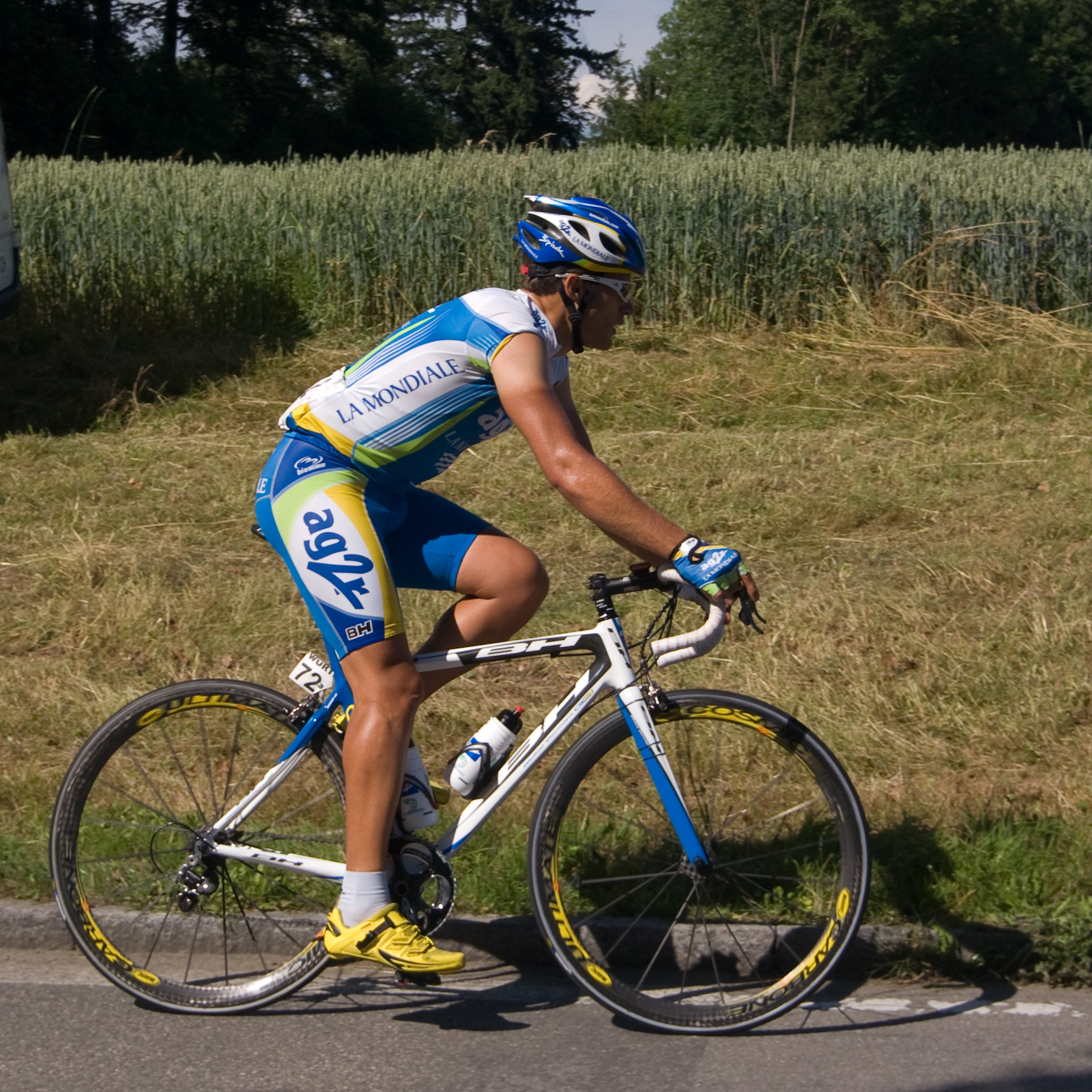

Personal information
- Full name: Sylvain Calzati
- Born: 1 July 1979 (age 47) Lyon, France
- Height: 1.77 m (5 ft 10 in)
- Weight: 68 kg (150 lb)

Cycling career
- Sport: Cycling
- Discipline: Road
- Role: Rider

Amateur teams
- 2001: Jean Delatour (stagiaire)
- 2002: Cofidis (stagiaire)

Professional teams
- 2003: Barloworld
- 2004: Saint-Quentin Oktos
- 2004: RAGT Semences
- 2005–2008: AG2R Prévoyance
- 2009: Agritubel
- 2010: Team Sky
- 2011: Bretagne–Schuller

Major wins
- Tour de l'Avenir (2004); 2006 Tour de France, 1 stage

Sylvain Calzati (born 1 July 1979 in Lyon) is a former French road bicycle racer, who competed as a professional between 2003 and 2011. He turned professional during the year 2003 with Barloworld, and his biggest success was winning the 8th Stage in the 2006 Tour de France. He also won the Tour de l'Avenir in 2004. He lives in Genay with his wife and daughter. He works as industrial cleaner.

== Major results ==
2004
1st, Overall, Tour de l'Avenir
2nd, Overall, Étoile de Bessèges
71st, Overall, Tour de France
2006
1st, Stage 8, Tour de France (Saint-Méen-le-Grand to Lorient)
