= Bernot =

Bernot is a French surname. As of 2013, there are more than 1,100 people in France who have this surname.

== Notable people ==
Notable people with this surname include:

- Alenka Bernot, Yugoslav canoer
- Dare Bernot, Yugoslav canoer
- Denise Bernot, French professor of Burmese
- Lorenza Bernot, Mexican beauty pageant contestant
- Louis Bernot, French weightlifter
- Natan Bernot, Yugoslav canoer
