= 2006 Tour de France =

2006 UCI ProTour, race 17 of 27
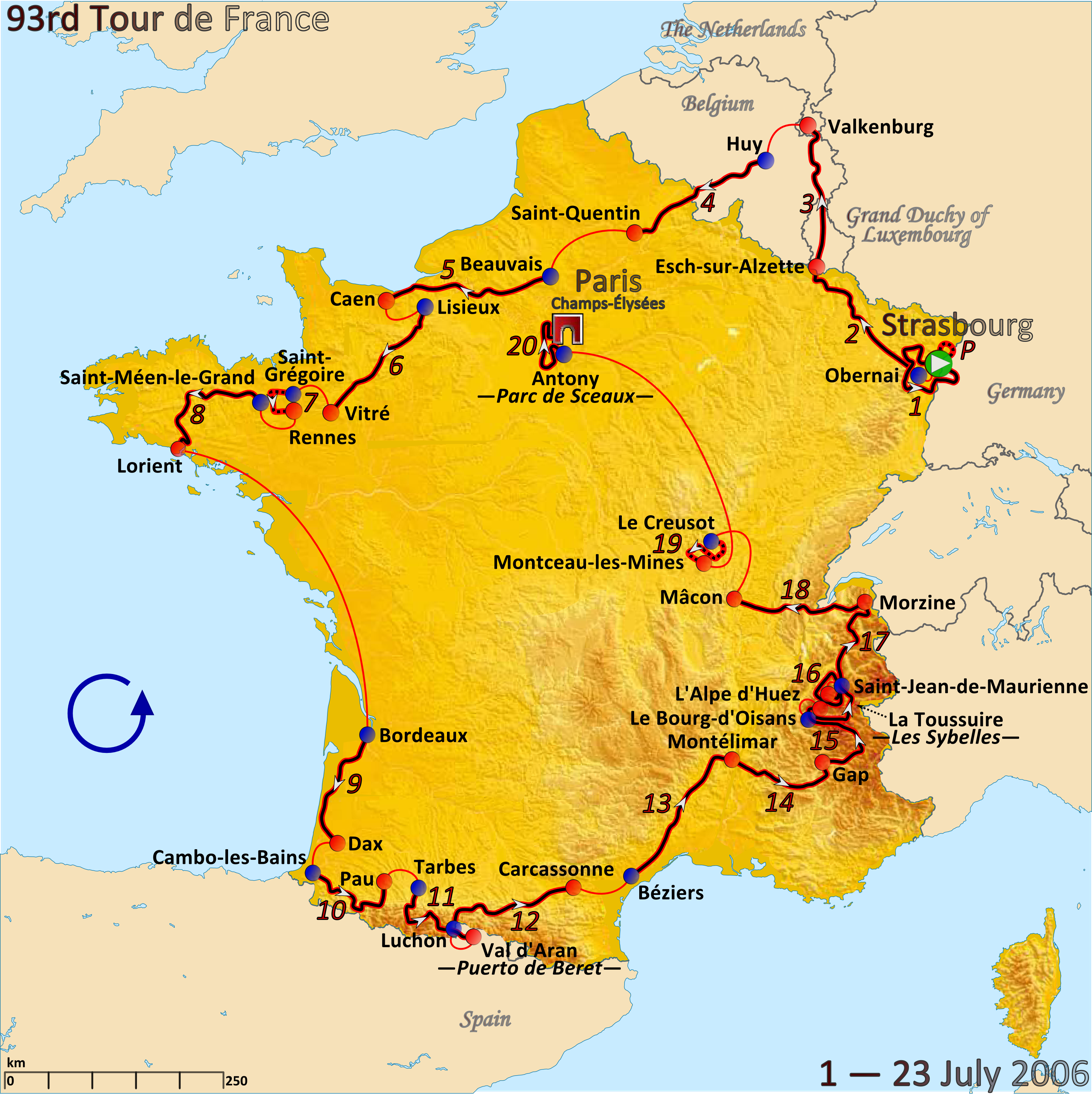
- Route of the 2006 Tour de France

Race details
- Dates: 1–23 July 2006
- Stages: 20 + prologue
- Distance: 3,657 km (2,272 mi)
- Winning time: 89h 40' 27"

Results
Jersey awarded to the overall winner	Winner	~~Floyd Landis~~ Óscar Pereiro (ESP)	(Caisse d'Epargne–Illes Balears)
	Second	Andreas Klöden (GER)	(T-Mobile Team)
	Third	Carlos Sastre (ESP)	(Team CSC)
Jersey awarded to the points classification winner	Points	Robbie McEwen (AUS)	(Davitamon–Lotto)
Jersey awarded to the mountains classification winner	Mountains	Michael Rasmussen (DEN)	(Rabobank)
Jersey awarded to the young rider classification winner	Young rider	Damiano Cunego (ITA)	(Lampre–Fondital)
Jersey awarded to the combativity classification winner	Combativity	David de la Fuente (ESP)	(Saunier Duval–Prodir)
Jersey awarded to the team classification winner	Team	T-Mobile Team	

The 2006 Tour de France was the 93rd edition of the Tour de France, one of cycling's Grand Tours. It took place between the 1st and the 23rd of July. It was won by Óscar Pereiro following the disqualification of Floyd Landis. Due to the United States Anti-Doping Agency announcing on August 24, 2012, that they had disqualified Lance Armstrong, a former teammate of Landis, from all of his results since August 1, 1998, including his seven Tour de France titles from 1999 to 2005, this is also the first Tour to have an overall winner since 1998. By terms of margin of victory the 2006 Tour was the 3rd closest of all time.

The Tour began with a prologue in Strasbourg, on the French-German border, and ended on Sunday 23 July in Paris. The distance of the course (run counterclockwise around France) was 3,657 km (2,272 mi). The race was the third fastest in average speed. Along the way, the cyclists passed through six different countries including France, The Netherlands (a stop at Valkenburg in Stage 3), Belgium (at Huy, Stages 3 and 4), Luxembourg (at Esch-sur-Alzette, Stages 2 and 3), Germany (though not stopping there, Stage 1) and Spain (Pla-de-Beret, Stage 11). The presentation of the course was made by the new director of Le Tour, Christian Prudhomme. For the first time since the 1999 edition, there was no team time trial.

The event, as with some of the Tours of the late 1990s, was marred by doping scandals. Prior to the tour, numerous riders – including the two favourites Jan Ullrich and Ivan Basso – were expelled from the Tour due to their link with the Operación Puerto doping case.

After the Tour, the apparent winner, Floyd Landis, was found to have failed a drug test after stage 17; Landis contested the result and demanded arbitration. On 20 September 2007, Landis was found guilty and suspended retroactive to 30 January 2007 and stripped of the 2006 Tour de France title making Óscar Pereiro the title holder. Landis appealed the decision to the Court of Arbitration for Sport which upheld the ban.

Pereiro was also suspected of having taken a forbidden substance during this Tour after failing a drug test. However, his use of the substance in question, salbutamol, was approved by the UCI for medical reasons.

Of the six Americans to complete this Tour, four of them had their results voided. The results of Chris Horner and Christian Vande Velde remain official, although Vande Velde had previous results voided. American Sprinter Fred Rodriguez did not finish the Tour, but his results remain valid.

== Teams ==
In the most controversial scandal since the 1998 tour, thirteen riders were expelled from the tour on the eve of Strasbourg prologue to the 93rd edition stemming from a Spanish doping scandal. Jan Ullrich and Ivan Basso, two favourites to win the race, were among those excluded from the Tour along with podium candidate Francisco Mancebo and Alberto Contador (who would return to win the following year, 2007). Alexander Vinokourov, another race favourite, was not linked to the doping scandal, but was forced to withdraw when the eligible riders on his Astana-Würth Team fell below the minimum starting requirement of six. Because of this and the retirement of then-seven-time consecutive winner Lance Armstrong, this year's Tour started without the top five riders from the 2005 edition. It was also the first Tour since 1999 that did not contain a past champion. All 21 teams were composed of nine cyclists, so 189 riders commenced the 2006 Tour de France.

The teams entering the race were:

- AG2R Prévoyance
- Agritubel
- Bouygues Télécom
- Caisse d'Epargne–Illes Balears
- Cofidis
- Crédit Agricole
- Team CSC
- Davitamon–Lotto
- Discovery Channel
- Euskaltel–Euskadi
- Française des Jeux
- Gerolsteiner
- Lampre–Fondital
- Liquigas
- Team Milram
- Phonak
- Quick-Step–Innergetic
- Rabobank
- Saunier Duval–Prodir
- T-Mobile Team

== Pre-race favourites ==
After the retirement of then seven-time winner Lance Armstrong, the main contenders for the overall win were expected to be Ivan Basso from Team CSC, the 2005 runner-up; and Jan Ullrich from T-Mobile Team, the third man on the podium in 2005, winner in 1997, and the only previous winner still racing. However, both Ullrich and Basso were suspended by their teams on 30 June after UCI told T-Mobile and Team CSC that the riders were involved in the anti-doping investigation in Spain. The 2006 Tour also saw the return of former yellow jersey holder and three-time stage winner David Millar (Saunier Duval–Prodir) after serving a two-year ban for admissions of the use of the drug EPO, which was discovered in a police search of his house before the 2004 Tour de France, in June 2004.

Francisco Mancebo of the French team AG2R Prévoyance, who finished fourth in 2005 and sixth in 2004, was also suspended by his team due to the Puerto investigation, and subsequently it was reported by the press that he announced his retirement. Mancebo denied this, claiming that he decided to change his focus. He would return to ride for Team Relax–GAM the following year and while he continued riding for more than another decade; with his change in focus he never entered another grand tour.

Alexander Vinokourov would have been the only returning rider with a top-five finish from last year's race. However, his team, Astana–Würth, was forced to pull out of the race because they would not be able to start with the minimum of six riders. As a result of the drug scandal, many believed Spaniard Alejandro Valverde (Caisse d'Épargne), or the Americans Floyd Landis (Phonak), Levi Leipheimer (Gerolsteiner), or Australian Cadel Evans (Davitamon–Lotto) would probably win the race.

== Route and stages ==
The highest point of elevation in the race was 2,642 m (8,668 ft) at the summit of the Col du Galibier mountain pass on stage 16.

Stage characteristics and winners
Stage	Date	Course	Distance	Type	Winner
P	1 July	Strasbourg	7.1 km (4 mi)	Individual time trial	Thor Hushovd (NOR)
1	2 July	Strasbourg	184.5 km (115 mi)	Flat stage	Jimmy Casper (FRA)
2	3 July	Obernai to Esch-sur-Alzette (Luxembourg)	228.5 km (142 mi)	Flat stage	Robbie McEwen (AUS)
3	4 July	Esch-sur-Alzette (Luxembourg) to Valkenburg (Netherlands)	216.5 km (135 mi)	Hilly stage	Matthias Kessler (GER)
4	5 July	Huy (Belgium) to Saint-Quentin	207.0 km (129 mi)	Flat stage	Robbie McEwen (AUS)
5	6 July	Beauvais to Caen	225.0 km (140 mi)	Flat stage	Óscar Freire (ESP)
6	7 July	Lisieux to Vitré	189.0 km (117 mi)	Flat stage	Robbie McEwen (AUS)
7	8 July	Saint Grégoire to Rennes	52.0 km (32 mi)	Individual time trial	Serhiy Honchar (UKR)
8	9 July	Saint-Méen-le-Grand to Lorient	181.0 km (112 mi)	Flat stage	Sylvain Calzati (FRA)
	10 July	Bordeaux		Rest day	
9	11 July	Bordeaux to Dax	169.5 km (105 mi)	Flat stage	Óscar Freire (ESP)
10	12 July	Cambo-les-Bains to Pau	190.5 km (118 mi)	Mountain stage	Juan Miguel Mercado (ESP)
11	13 July	Tarbes to Val d'Aran/Pla-de-Beret (Spain)	206.5 km (128 mi)	Mountain stage	Denis Menchov (RUS)
12	14 July	Luchon to Carcassonne	211.5 km (131 mi)	Hilly stage	Yaroslav Popovych (UKR)
13	15 July	Béziers to Montélimar	230.0 km (143 mi)	Flat stage	Jens Voigt (GER)
14	16 July	Montélimar to Gap	180.5 km (112 mi)	Hilly stage	Pierrick Fédrigo (FRA)
	17 July	Gap		Rest day	
15	18 July	Gap to Alpe d'Huez	187.0 km (116 mi)	Mountain stage	Fränk Schleck (LUX)
16	19 July	Le Bourg-d'Oisans to La Toussuire	182.0 km (113 mi)	Mountain stage	Michael Rasmussen (DEN)
17	20 July	Saint-Jean-de-Maurienne to Morzine	200.5 km (125 mi)	Mountain stage	Carlos Sastre (ESP)
18	21 July	Morzine to Mâcon	197.0 km (122 mi)	Flat stage	Matteo Tosatto (ITA)
19	22 July	Le Creusot to Montceau-les-Mines	57.0 km (35 mi)	Individual time trial	Serhiy Honchar (UKR)
20	23 July	Antony/Parc de Sceaux to Paris (Champs-Élysées)	154.5 km (96 mi)	Flat stage	Thor Hushovd (NOR)
	Total		3,657 km (2,272 mi)		

== Race overview ==
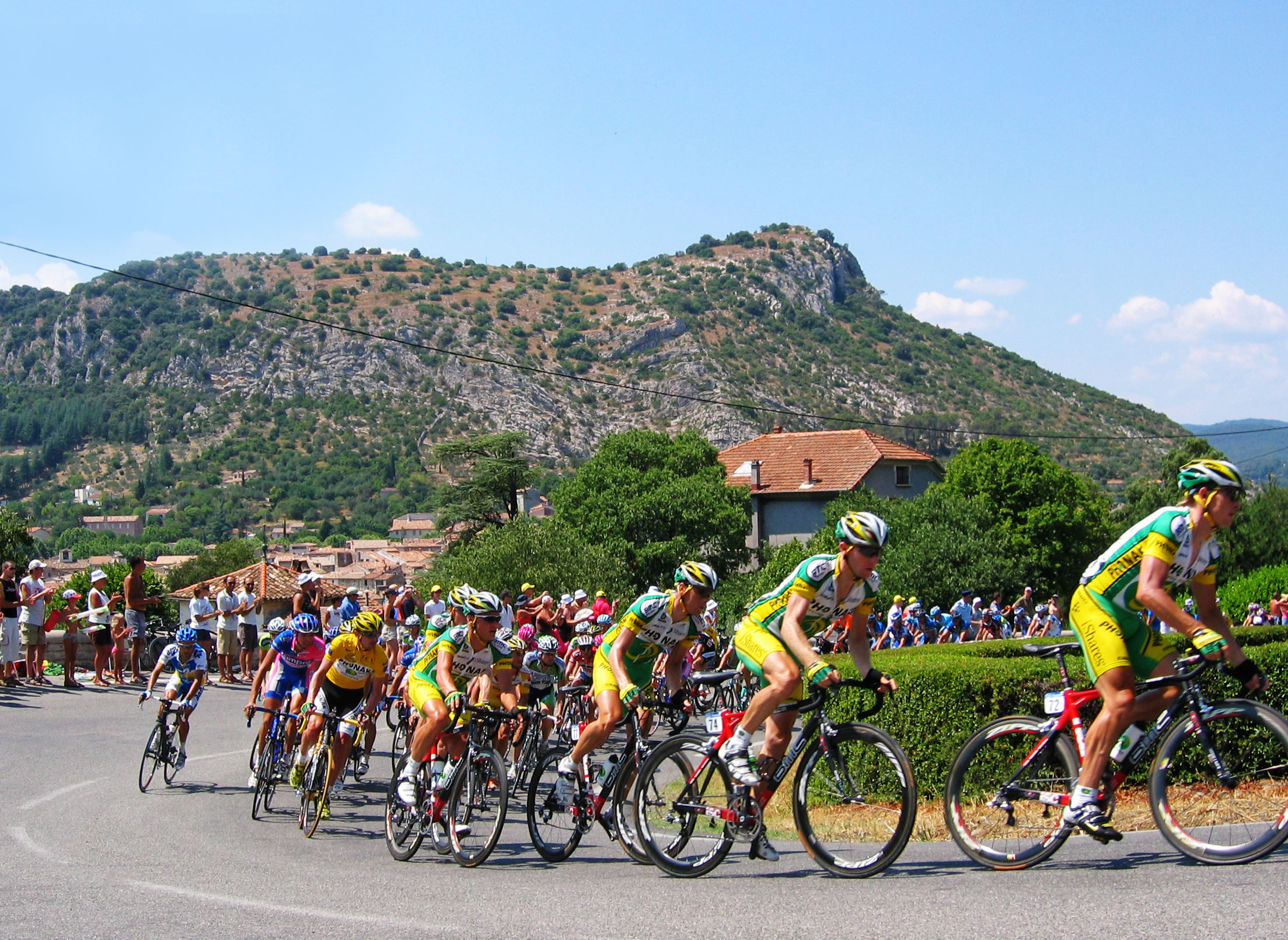
Riders from Phonak during stage two

Due to the developing doping case known as Operacion Puerto several top tier riders were denied entry to the 2006 Tour including Jan Ullrich, Joseba Beloki, Alberto Contador, Ivan Basso and indirectly, as his team did not have enough eligible riders, Alexander Vinokourov. The Prologue was won by Thor Hushovd and over the first few flat stages Robbie McEwen claimed three stage victories, but did not take the overall lead at any point as by Stage 3 another sprinter, Tom Boonen, had claimed the Yellow Jersey, which he held until the ITT in Stage 7.

The ITT was won handily by Serhiy Gonchar who claimed the maillot jaune with Floyd Landis finishing in 2nd in the Stage, as well as moving up the standings into 2nd place in the overall. After the ITT Team T-Mobile had four riders in the top 6 overall including Honchar and Andreas Klöden. The top of the GC remained more or less static until Stage 10 when a pair of riders escaped early in the day and stayed away to the finish with Juan Miguel Mercado winning the stage and moving into 2nd place overall and Cyril Dessel finishing the stage 2nd with the same time as Mercado, but taking over the Yellow Jersey as the new race leader.

Stage 11 was a brutal mountain stage with five highly categorised climbs. It was won by Dennis Menchov with Levi Leipheimer and Floyd Landis staying with him to the finish line. Landis took over the Yellow Jersey as the new race leader :08 ahead of Dessel. Cadel Evans and Carlos Sastre finished 4th and 5th in the stage and at the same time moved into 4th and 5th in the overall standings. Stage 12 was an intermediate stage won by Yaroslav Popovych who jumped from outside the top 20 to tenth place overall.

The top GC Contenders wouldn't change places until Stage 13 when Jens Voigt and Óscar Pereiro outlasted Manuel Quinziato and Sylvain Chavanel in a four-man breakaway that finished about 30 minutes ahead of the Peloton. Pereiro jumped everyone to take the overall lead by about 1:30 over Landis and Dessel and around 2:30 ahead of Menchov and Evans with Sastre over 3:00 back.

The situation remained the same after Stage 14, but in Stage 15 from Col d'Izoard to Alpe d'Huez the race blew apart with Fränk Schleck winning the stage and among the GC riders Landis and Kloden winning considerable time on everyone but one another. Landis was back in Yellow by a thread of :10 with the 3rd through 7th place riders of Dessel, Menchov, Sastre, Kloden and Evans each within only three minutes of Landis and Pereiro. Stage 16 was won by Michael Rasmussen as Pereiro took over the race lead with Sastre jumping up to 2nd, Kloden taking over 3rd and Landis coming entirely unhinged and dropping outside the top 10.

In Stage 17 however, Landis made the potentially catastrophic decision to attack off the front of the Peloton entirely on his own over 100 km from the finish in pursuit of the morning Breakaway bunch. Before long he caught the escapees, rode with the break for a while, then attacked off the front with only Patrice Halgand and Patrik Sinkewitz able to stay with him for any length of time, though without doing any work being as Halgand was nearly cooked, and Sinkewitz was teammates with two riders placed higher than Landis in Kloden and Michael Rogers. Landis won the stage with Sastre finishing nearly six minutes back and Pereiro finishing over seven minutes back barely hanging onto the maillot jaune by :30 over Floyd Landis and :12 over Carlos Sastre. At this point in the Tour, Kloden, Evans, Menchov and Dessel were all within 5:00 of the Yellow Jersey; not since the 1987 Tour de France had even five riders been within 5:00 of the overall lead this late in the race.

Stage 18 there were no serious (Cat-1 or HC) climbs and Matteo Tosatto won the Sprint with no change in the overall situation. The Stage 19 ITT would decide the race and Gonchar would win his second stage of the Tour putting in the fastest ride of the day. Floyd Landis won the 2006 TDF by defeating all of the other GC Contenders except for Kloden taking the Yellow Jersey back for the 3rd and final time. Pereiro finished 2nd overall at 0:59 back, Kloden rounded out the podium at plus 1:29, Sastre was 4th over three minutes behind and Cadel Evans finished 5th just over 5:00 slower than Landis.

=== Doping ===
This was the first TDF since the first retirement of Lance Armstrong and to the majority of American fans doping by contending riders was thought of as a rare occurrence that just didn't happen even though in reality many GC Contenders, Sprinters and Domestiques of the Armstrong Era, as well as previous eras admitted to doping or were implicated in some form of doping incident. Landis would be stripped of his only Tour de France victory soon after winning it following a confirmed failed drug test after Stage 17 and Óscar Pereiro would be declared the winner.

2006 Tour de France winner Óscar Pereiro was a highly skilled athlete who finished 10th, 1st, 10th and 10th in the four TDF's that he finished and even scored a goal apiece in the two professional soccer games he played in. He initially failed a drug test in this Tour de France as well, but was cleared after providing sufficient medical evidence that he had a legitimate medical reason for taking the substance he failed for.

Despite Landis having this entire TDF vacated for doping, among some modern riders and fans when a GC rider attacks and finishes a seemingly impossible solo breakaway, as Chris Froome did in Stage 19 of the 2018 Giro, it is referred to as "Doing a Landis".

This was initially the closest three-way finish in the race's history to date. Floyd's final time was 89h 39'30". While Landis was a leading favourite even before the Spanish doping scandal came to light, in an epic eight-minute loss of performance in Stage 16, it appeared he had lost all hope to finish on the podium, much less win.

But the following day, during Stage 17, Landis set a very high pace on the first climb of the day that no other rider could match. He then caught a breakaway group that had escaped earlier, passed them, and continued to the finish line solo, making up almost all of his deficit, ending up 30 seconds behind yellow jersey wearer Óscar Pereiro, which he made up with an extra minute in the final Stage 19 time trial.

A urine sample taken from Landis immediately after his Stage 17 win has twice tested positive for banned synthetic testosterone as well as a ratio of testosterone to epitestosterone nearly three times the limit allowed by World Anti-Doping Agency rules. Landis indicated that he would appeal the test results with the Court of Arbitration for Sport in Lausanne, Switzerland.

On 20 September 2007, Landis' doping accusation was upheld by an arbitration panel deciding between him and USADA and will be banned for two years. In response to this, the UCI formally stripped him of his 2006 Tour de France title. Second place finisher Óscar Pereiro was officially declared the winner. The only previous Tour de France winner to be disqualified was 1904 Tour de France winner Maurice Garin.

Not long after getting surgery for his hip, while still on crutches, Landis briefly participated in a 2008 documentary film about steroids and performance-enhancing drugs titled Bigger, Stronger, Faster*. During his brief interview he showed the homemade altitude chamber he slept in, which by the time of the documentary was kept on the ground outside his garage. He stated that he slept at an altitude of 13,000 feet, felt proud of what he accomplished in the 2006 Tour and at that time, still considered himself the winner.

== Classification leadership and minor prizes ==
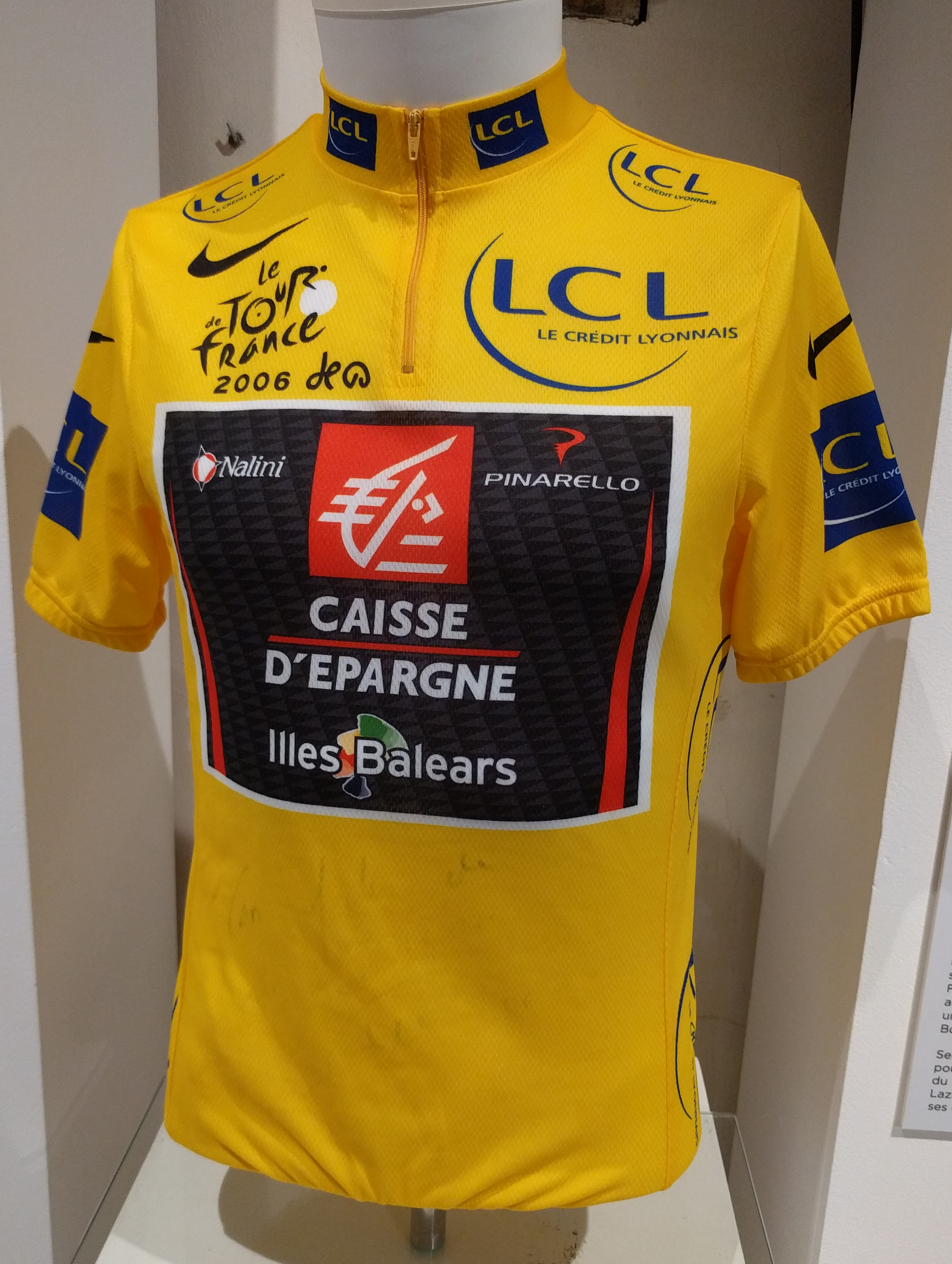
Óscar Pereiro's yellow jersey of the 2006 Tour

There were four main individual classifications contested in the 2006 Tour de France, as well as a team competition. The most important was the general classification, which was calculated by adding each rider's finishing times on each stage. There time bonuses given at the end of each mass start stage. If a crash had happened within the final 3 km (1.9 mi) of a stage, not including time trials and summit finishes, the riders involved would have received the same time as the group they were in when the crash occurred. The rider with the lowest cumulative time was the winner of the general classification and was considered the overall winner of the Tour. The rider leading the classification wore a yellow jersey.

The second classification was the points classification. Riders received points for finishing in the highest positions in a stage finish, or in intermediate sprints during the stage. The points available for each stage finish were determined by the stage's type. The leader was identified by a green jersey.

The third classification was the mountains classification. Most stages of the race included one or more categorised climbs, in which points were awarded to the riders that reached the summit first. The climbs were categorised as fourth-, third-, second- or first-category and hors catégorie, with the more difficult climbs rated lower. The leader wore a white jersey with red polka dots.

The final individual classification was the young rider classification. This was calculated the same way as the general classification, but the classification was restricted to riders who were born on or after 1 January 1981. The leader wore a white jersey.

The final classification was a team classification. This was calculated using the finishing times of the best three riders per team on each stage; the leading team was the team with the lowest cumulative time. The number of stage victories and placings per team determined the outcome of a tie. The riders in the team that lead this classification were for the first time identified with yellow number bibs on the back of their jerseys.

In addition, there was a combativity award given after each mass start stage to the rider considered, by a jury, to have "made the greatest effort and who has demonstrated the best qualities of sportsmanship". The winner wore a red number bib the following stage. At the conclusion of the Tour, David de la Fuente (Saunier Duval–Prodir) was given the overall super-combativity award.

There were also two special awards each with a prize of €5000, the Souvenir Henri Desgrange, given in honour of Tour founder and first race director Henri Desgrange to the first rider to pass the summit of the Col du Galibier on stage 16, and the Souvenir Jacques Goddet, given in honour of the second director Jacques Goddet to the first rider to pass the summit of the Col du Tourmalet on stage 11. Michael Rasmussen won the Henri Desgrange and de la Fuente won the Jacques Goddet.

Classification leadership by stage
Stage	Winner	General classification	Points classification	Mountains classification	Young rider classification	Team classification	Combativity award
P	Thor Hushovd	Thor Hushovd	Thor Hushovd	no award	Joost Posthuma	Discovery Channel	no award
1	Jimmy Casper	~~George Hincapie~~	Jimmy Casper	Fabian Wegmann	Benoît Vaugrenard	Discovery Channel	Walter Bénéteau
2	Robbie McEwen	Thor Hushovd	Robbie McEwen	David de la Fuente	Benoît Vaugrenard	Discovery Channel	David de la Fuente
3	Matthias Kessler	Tom Boonen	Tom Boonen	Jérôme Pineau	Markus Fothen	Discovery Channel	José Luis Arrieta
4	Robbie McEwen	Tom Boonen	Robbie McEwen	Jérôme Pineau	Markus Fothen	Discovery Channel	Egoi Martínez
5	Óscar Freire	Tom Boonen	Robbie McEwen	Jérôme Pineau	Markus Fothen	Discovery Channel	Samuel Dumoulin
6	Robbie McEwen	Tom Boonen	Robbie McEwen	Jérôme Pineau	Benoît Vaugrenard	Discovery Channel	Anthony Geslin
7	Serhiy Honchar	Serhiy Honchar	Robbie McEwen	Jérôme Pineau	Markus Fothen	T-Mobile Team	no award
8	Sylvain Calzati	Serhiy Honchar	Robbie McEwen	Jérôme Pineau	Markus Fothen	T-Mobile Team	Sylvain Calzati
9	Óscar Freire	Serhiy Honchar	Robbie McEwen	Jérôme Pineau	Markus Fothen	T-Mobile Team	Christian Knees
10	Juan Miguel Mercado	Cyril Dessel	Robbie McEwen	Cyril Dessel	Markus Fothen	AG2R Prévoyance	Juan Miguel Mercado
11	Denis Menchov	~~Floyd Landis~~ Cyril Dessel	Robbie McEwen	David de la Fuente	Markus Fothen	T-Mobile Team	David de la Fuente
12	Yaroslav Popovych	~~Floyd Landis~~ Cyril Dessel	Robbie McEwen	David de la Fuente	Markus Fothen	T-Mobile Team	Daniele Bennati
13	Jens Voigt	Óscar Pereiro	Robbie McEwen	David de la Fuente	Markus Fothen	Team CSC	Jens Voigt
14	Pierrick Fédrigo	Óscar Pereiro	Robbie McEwen	David de la Fuente	Markus Fothen	Team CSC	Salvatore Commesso
15	Fränk Schleck	~~Floyd Landis~~ Óscar Pereiro	Robbie McEwen	David de la Fuente	Markus Fothen	Team CSC	Stefano Garzelli
16	Michael Rasmussen	Óscar Pereiro	Robbie McEwen	Michael Rasmussen	Markus Fothen	Team CSC	Michael Rasmussen
17	~~Floyd Landis~~ Carlos Sastre	Óscar Pereiro	Robbie McEwen	Michael Rasmussen	Damiano Cunego	T-Mobile Team	~~Floyd Landis~~
18	Matteo Tosatto	Óscar Pereiro	Robbie McEwen	Michael Rasmussen	Damiano Cunego	T-Mobile Team	~~Levi Leipheimer~~
19	Serhiy Honchar	~~Floyd Landis~~ Óscar Pereiro	Robbie McEwen	Michael Rasmussen	Damiano Cunego	T-Mobile Team	no award
20	Thor Hushovd	~~Floyd Landis~~ Óscar Pereiro	Robbie McEwen	Michael Rasmussen	Damiano Cunego	T-Mobile Team	Aitor Hernández
Final		~~Floyd Landis~~ Óscar Pereiro	Robbie McEwen	Michael Rasmussen	Damiano Cunego	T-Mobile Team	David de la Fuente

- In stage 1, George Hincapie wore the green jersey.
- In stage 4, Daniele Bennati wore the green jersey.
- In stage 11, Juan Miguel Mercado wore the polka-dot jersey
- Stage 17 was originally won by Floyd Landis, who also wore the yellow jersey on the 19th and 20th stage. After the court's decision to forfeit all his results in the 2006 Tour de France, Carlos Sastre became the winner of the 17th stage, and Cyril Dessel and Óscar Pereiro should be considered having led the general classification as shown in the table.

== Final standings ==
Legend
A yellow jersey.	Denotes the winner of the general classification	A green jersey.	Denotes the winner of the points classification
A white jersey with red polka dots.	Denotes the winner of the mountains classification	A white jersey.	Denotes the winner of the young rider classification
A white jersey with a yellow number bib.	Denotes the winner of the team classification	A white jersey with a red number bib.	Denotes the winner of the super-combativity award

=== General classification ===
Final general classification (1–10)
Rank	Rider	Team	Time
DSQ	~~Floyd Landis (USA)~~	~~Phonak~~	~~89h 39' 30"~~
1	Óscar Pereiro (ESP)	Caisse d'Epargne–Illes Balears	89h 40' 27"
2	Andreas Klöden (GER)	T-Mobile Team	+ 0' 32"
3	Carlos Sastre (ESP)	Team CSC	+ 2' 16"
4	Cadel Evans (AUS)	Davitamon–Lotto	+ 4' 11"
5	Denis Menchov (RUS)	Rabobank	+ 6' 09"
6	Cyril Dessel (FRA)	AG2R Prévoyance	+ 7' 44"
7	Christophe Moreau (FRA)	AG2R Prévoyance	+ 8' 40"
8	Haimar Zubeldia (ESP)	Euskaltel–Euskadi	+ 11' 08"
9	Michael Rogers (AUS)	T-Mobile Team	+ 14' 10"
10	Fränk Schleck (LUX)	Team CSC	+ 16' 49"

Final general classification (11–138)
Rank	Rider	Team	Time
11	Damiano Cunego (ITA)	Lampre–Fondital	+ 18' 22"
DSQ	~~Levi Leipheimer~~ (USA)	~~Gerolsteiner~~	~~+18' 25"~~
DSQ	~~Michael Boogerd (NED)~~	~~Rabobank~~	~~+ 18' 49"~~
13	Markus Fothen (GER)	Gerolsteiner	+ 19' 00"
14	Pietro Caucchioli (ITA)	Crédit Agricole	+ 20' 15"
15	Tadej Valjavec (SLO)	Lampre–Fondital	+ 25' 28"
16	Michael Rasmussen (DEN)	Rabobank	+ 27' 36"
17	José Azevedo (POR)	Discovery Channel	+ 37' 11"
18	Marzio Bruseghin (ITA)	Lampre–Fondital	+ 42' 08"
19	David Arroyo (ESP)	Caisse d'Epargne–Illes Balears	+ 43' 03"
20	Francisco Javier Vila (ESP)	Lampre–Fondital	+ 43' 31"
21	Patrik Sinkewitz (GER)	T-Mobile Team	+ 48' 04"
22	Christian Vande Velde (USA)	Team CSC	+ 49' 22"
23	Yaroslav Popovych (UKR)	Discovery Channel	+ 51' 05"
24	Giuseppe Guerini (ITA)	T-Mobile Team	+ 57' 02"
25	Eddy Mazzoleni (ITA)	T-Mobile Team	+ 1h 01' 43"
26	José Luis Arrieta (ESP)	AG2R Prévoyance	+ 1h 02' 03"
27	Pierrick Fédrigo (FRA)	Bouygues Télécom	+ 1h 04' 30"
28	Vladimir Karpets (RUS)	Caisse d'Epargne–Illes Balears	+ 1h 06' 21"
29	Axel Merckx (BEL)	Phonak	+ 1h 08' 31"
DSQ	~~George Hincapie~~ (USA)	~~Discovery Channel~~	~~+1h 10' 17"~~
30	Xabier Zandio (ESP)	Caisse d'Epargne–Illes Balears	+ 1h 15' 50"
31	Sylvain Calzati (FRA)	AG2R Prévoyance	+ 1h 19' 29"
32	Iker Camaño (ESP)	Euskaltel–Euskadi	+ 1h 20' 37"
33	Mikel Astarloza (ESP)	AG2R Prévoyance	+ 1h 23' 29"
34	Stéphane Goubert (FRA)	AG2R Prévoyance	+ 1h 27' 36"
35	Laurent Lefèvre (FRA)	Bouygues Télécom	+ 1h 29' 27"
36	Benoit Salmon (FRA)	Agritubel	+ 1h 29' 58"
37	Christophe Brandt (BEL)	Davitamon–Lotto	+ 1h 33' 27"
38	Christophe Rinero (FRA)	Saunier Duval–Prodir	+ 1h 34' 02"
39	Egoi Martínez (ESP)	Discovery Channel	+ 1h 34' 15"
40	Iván Ramiro Parra (COL)	Cofidis	+ 1h 36' 12"
41	Cristian Moreni (ITA)	Cofidis	+ 1h 37' 10"
42	Sylvain Chavanel (FRA)	Cofidis	+ 1h 39' 08"
43	Ruben Lobato (ESP)	Saunier Duval–Prodir	+ 1h 39' 55"
44	Georg Totschnig (AUT)	Gerolsteiner	+ 1h 41' 58"
45	Patrice Halgand (FRA)	Crédit Agricole	+ 1h 42' 06"
46	Alexander Bocharov (RUS)	Crédit Agricole	+ 1h 43' 49"
47	Iñigo Landaluze (ESP)	Euskaltel–Euskadi	+ 1h 47' 25"
48	Matthieu Sprick (FRA)	Bouygues Télécom	+ 1h 47' 34"
49	Serhiy Honchar (UKR)	T-Mobile Team	+ 1h 48' 25"
50	Jens Voigt (GER)	Team CSC	+ 1h 49' 44"
51	Matthias Kessler (GER)	T-Mobile Team	+ 1h 51' 06"
52	Stefano Garzelli (ITA)	Liquigas	+ 1h 52' 58"
53	David de la Fuente (ESP)	Saunier Duval–Prodir	+ 1h 54' 22"
54	Salvatore Commesso (ITA)	Lampre–Fondital	+ 1h 55' 58"
55	David Moncoutié (FRA)	Cofidis	+ 2h 02' 13"
56	David Millar (GBR)	Saunier Duval–Prodir	+ 2h 03' 13"
57	Gilberto Simoni (ITA)	Saunier Duval–Prodir	+ 2h 06' 21"
58	Moisés Dueñas (ESP)	Agritubel	+ 2h 07' 02"
59	Koos Moerenhout (NED)	Phonak	+ 2h 08' 06"
60	Thomas Lövkvist (SWE)	Française des Jeux	+ 2h 11' 16"
61	Chris Horner (USA)	Davitamon–Lotto	+ 2h 11' 28"
62	Pavel Padrnos (CZE)	Discovery Channel	+ 2h 15' 48"
63	Sebastian Lang (GER)	Gerolsteiner	+ 2h 24' 18"
64	Alessandro Ballan (ITA)	Lampre–Fondital	+ 2h 25' 37"
65	Fabian Wegmann (GER)	Gerolsteiner	+ 2h 26' 20"
67	Sandy Casar (FRA)	Française des Jeux	+ 2h 27' 37"
68	Paolo Tiralongo (ITA)	Lampre–Fondital	+ 2h 31' 11"
69	Iñaki Isasi (ESP)	Euskaltel–Euskadi	+ 2h 31' 39"
70	Juan Manuel Gárate (ESP)	Quick-Step–Innergetic	+ 2h 31' 50"
71	Didier Rous (FRA)	Bouygues Télécom	+ 2h 31' 57"
DSQ	~~David Zabriskie~~ (USA)	~~Team CSC~~	~~+2h 32' 49"~~
72	Gorka Verdugo (ESP)	Euskaltel–Euskadi	+ 2h 32' 55"
73	Christophe Le Mével (FRA)	Crédit Agricole	+ 2h 33' 27"
74	Carlos Da Cruz (FRA)	Française des Jeux	+ 2h 39' 04"
75	Francisco José Ventoso (ESP)	Saunier Duval–Prodir	+ 2h 40' 25"
76	Simon Gerrans (AUS)	AG2R Prévoyance	+ 2h 45' 36"
77	Manuel Quinziato (ITA)	Liquigas	+ 2h 46' 36"
78	Björn Schröder (GER)	Team Milram	+ 2h 46' 51"
79	Juan Antonio Flecha (ESP)	Rabobank	+ 2h 48' 56"
80	Jérôme Pineau (FRA)	Bouygues Télécom	+ 2h 50' 25"
81	Viatcheslav Ekimov (RUS)	Discovery Channel	+ 2h 50' 36"
82	Joost Posthuma (NED)	Rabobank	+ 2h 51' 03"
83	Erik Zabel (GER)	Team Milram	+ 2h 51' 16"
84	Benoît Vaugrenard (FRA)	Française des Jeux	+ 2h 51' 34"
85	Anthony Geslin (FRA)	Bouygues Télécom	+ 2h 51' 34"
86	Thomas Voeckler (FRA)	Bouygues Télécom	+ 2h 52' 00"
87	Manuel Calvente (ESP)	Agritubel	+ 2h 52' 30"
88	Stuart O'Grady (AUS)	Team CSC	+ 2h 54' 28"
89	José-Luis Rubiera (ESP)	Discovery Channel	+ 2h 54' 47"
90	Pieter Weening (NED)	Rabobank	+ 2h 55' 06"
91	Bram Tankink (NED)	Quick-Step–Innergetic	+ 2h 56' 05"
92	Cédric Vasseur (FRA)	Quick-Step–Innergetic	+ 2h 57' 58"
93	Ronny Scholz (GER)	Gerolsteiner	+ 2h 59' 51"
94	Alexandre Moos (SUI)	Phonak	+ 3h 00' 37"
95	Riccardo Riccò (ITA)	Saunier Duval–Prodir	+ 3h 00' 40"
96	Marco Velo (ITA)	Team Milram	+ 3h 01' 12"
97	Nicolas Portal (FRA)	Caisse d'Epargne–Illes Balears	+ 3h 01' 23"
98	Luca Paolini (ITA)	Liquigas	+ 3h 03' 21"
99	Ralf Grabsch (GER)	Team Milram	+ 3h 03' 24"
100	Nicolas Jalabert (FRA)	Phonak	+ 3h 04' 08"
101	Christian Knees (GER)	Team Milram	+ 3h 05' 01"
102	Gustav Larsson (SWE)	Française des Jeux	+ 3h 05' 17"
103	Mario Aerts (BEL)	Davitamon–Lotto	+ 3h 05' 29"
104	Bert Grabsch (GER)	Phonak	+ 3h 07' 26"
105	Bernhard Eisel (AUT)	Française des Jeux	+ 3h 08' 02"
106	Daniele Righi (ITA)	Lampre–Fondital	+ 3h 11' 54"
107	Philippe Gilbert (BEL)	Française des Jeux	+ 3h 12' 06"
108	Walter Bénéteau (FRA)	Bouygues Télécom	+ 3h 14' 44"
109	Johan Vansummeren (BEL)	Davitamon–Lotto	+ 3h 17' 47"
110	Sébastien Hinault (FRA)	Crédit Agricole	+ 3h 18' 18"
111	Anthony Charteau (FRA)	Crédit Agricole	+ 3h 19' 32"
112	José Vicente Garcia (ESP)	Caisse d'Epargne–Illes Balears	+ 3h 19' 35"
113	Robbie McEwen (AUS)	Davitamon–Lotto	+ 3h 20' 04"
114	Eduardo Gonzalo (ESP)	Agritubel	+ 3h 20' 30"
115	Michael Albasini (SUI)	Liquigas	+ 3h 20' 37"
116	Matej Mugerli (SLO)	Liquigas	+ 3h 20' 51"
117	Samuel Dumoulin (FRA)	AG2R Prévoyance	+ 3h 21' 18"
118	Thor Hushovd (NOR)	Crédit Agricole	+ 3h 22' 55"
119	Víctor Hugo Peña (COL)	Phonak	+ 3h 23' 39"
120	Stéphane Augé (FRA)	Cofidis	+ 3h 24' 22"
121	Bradley Wiggins (GBR)	Cofidis	+ 3h 24' 35"
122	Matteo Tosatto (ITA)	Quick-Step–Innergetic	+ 3h 24' 57"
123	Christophe Laurent (FRA)	Agritubel	+ 3h 25' 26"
124	Unai Etxebarria (VEN)	Euskaltel–Euskadi	+ 3h 29' 15"
125	Julian Dean (NZL)	Crédit Agricole	+ 3h 29' 36"
126	Patrick Calcagni (SUI)	Liquigas	+ 3h 32' 31"
127	Arnaud Coyot (FRA)	Cofidis	+ 3h 34' 37"
128	Christophe Mengin (FRA)	Française des Jeux	+ 3h 34' 55"
129	Kjell Carlström (FIN)	Liquigas	+ 3h 34' 56"
130	Filippo Pozzato (ITA)	Quick-Step–Innergetic	+ 3h 36' 09"
131	Cédric Coutouly (FRA)	Agritubel	+ 3h 38' 03"
132	Peter Wrolich (AUT)	Gerolsteiner	+ 3h 38' 23"
133	Aitor Hernández (ESP)	Euskaltel–Euskadi	+ 3h 49' 19"
134	Gert Steegmans (BEL)	Davitamon–Lotto	+ 3h 58' 19"
135	Jimmy Casper (FRA)	Cofidis	+ 3h 59' 08"
136	Wim Vansevenant (BEL)	Davitamon–Lotto	+ 4h 01' 04"

=== Points classification ===
Final points classification (1–10)
Rank	Rider	Team	Points
1	Robbie McEwen (AUS)	Davitamon–Lotto	288
2	Erik Zabel (GER)	Team Milram	199
3	Thor Hushovd (NOR)	Crédit Agricole	195
4	Bernhard Eisel (AUT)	Française des Jeux	176
5	Luca Paolini (ITA)	Liquigas	174
6	Iñaki Isasi (ESP)	Euskaltel–Euskadi	130
7	Francisco Ventoso (ESP)	Saunier Duval–Prodir	128
8	Cristian Moreni (ITA)	Cofidis	116
9	Jimmy Casper (FRA)	Cofidis	98
10	Óscar Pereiro (ESP)	Caisse d'Epargne–Illes Balears	88

=== Mountains classification ===
Final mountains classification (1–10)
Rank	Rider	Team	Points
1	Michael Rasmussen (DEN)	Rabobank	166
2	David de la Fuente (ESP)	Saunier Duval–Prodir	113
3	Carlos Sastre (ESP)	Team CSC	99
4	Fränk Schleck (LUX)	Team CSC	96
DSQ	~~Michael Boogerd~~ (NED)	~~Rabobank~~	~~93~~
6	Damiano Cunego (ITA)	Lampre–Fondital	80
7	Cyril Dessel (FRA)	AG2R Prévoyance	72
DSQ	~~Levi Leipheimer~~ (USA)	~~Team Gerolsteiner~~	~~66~~
9	Andreas Klöden (GER)	T-Mobile Team	64
10	Óscar Pereiro (ESP)	Caisse d'Epargne–Illes Balears	63

=== Young rider classification ===
Final young rider classification (1–10)
Rank	Rider	Team	Time
1	Damiano Cunego (ITA)	Lampre–Fondital	89h 58' 49"
2	Markus Fothen (GER)	Team Gerolsteiner	+ 38"
3	Matthieu Sprick (FRA)	Bouygues Télécom	+ 1h 29' 12"
4	David de la Fuente (ESP)	Saunier Duval–Prodir	+ 1h 36' 00"
5	Moisés Dueñas (ESP)	Agritubel	+ 1h 48' 40"
6	Thomas Lövkvist (SWE)	Française des Jeux	+ 1h 52' 54"
7	Francisco Ventoso (ESP)	Saunier Duval–Prodir	+ 2h 22' 03"
8	Joost Posthuma (NED)	Rabobank	+ 2h 32' 41"
9	Benoît Vaugrenard (FRA)	Française des Jeux	+ 2h 33' 12"
10	Pieter Weening (NED)	Rabobank	+ 2h 36' 44"

=== Team classification ===
Final team classification (1–10)
Rank	Team	Time
1	T-Mobile Team	269h 08' 46"
2	Team CSC	+ 17' 04"
3	Rabobank	+ 23' 26"
4	AG2R Prévoyance	+ 33' 19"
5	Caisse d'Epargne–Illes Balears	+ 56' 53"
6	Lampre–Fondital	+ 57' 37"
7	Team Gerolsteiner	+ 1h 45' 25"
8	Discovery Channel	+ 2h 19' 17"
9	Euskaltel–Euskadi	+ 2h 26' 38"
10	Phonak Hearing Systems	+ 2h 49' 06"*

== See also ==
- List of doping cases in cycling

== Bibliography ==
- Augendre, Jacques (2016). "Guide historique" [Historical guide] (PDF). Tour de France (in French). Paris: Amaury Sport Organisation. Archived (PDF) from the original on 17 August 2016.
- "Race regulations" (PDF). Tour de France. Paris: Amaury Sport Organisation. 2006. Archived from the original (PDF) on 5 July 2006.
