= Saint-Georges-du-Vièvre =

- Commune
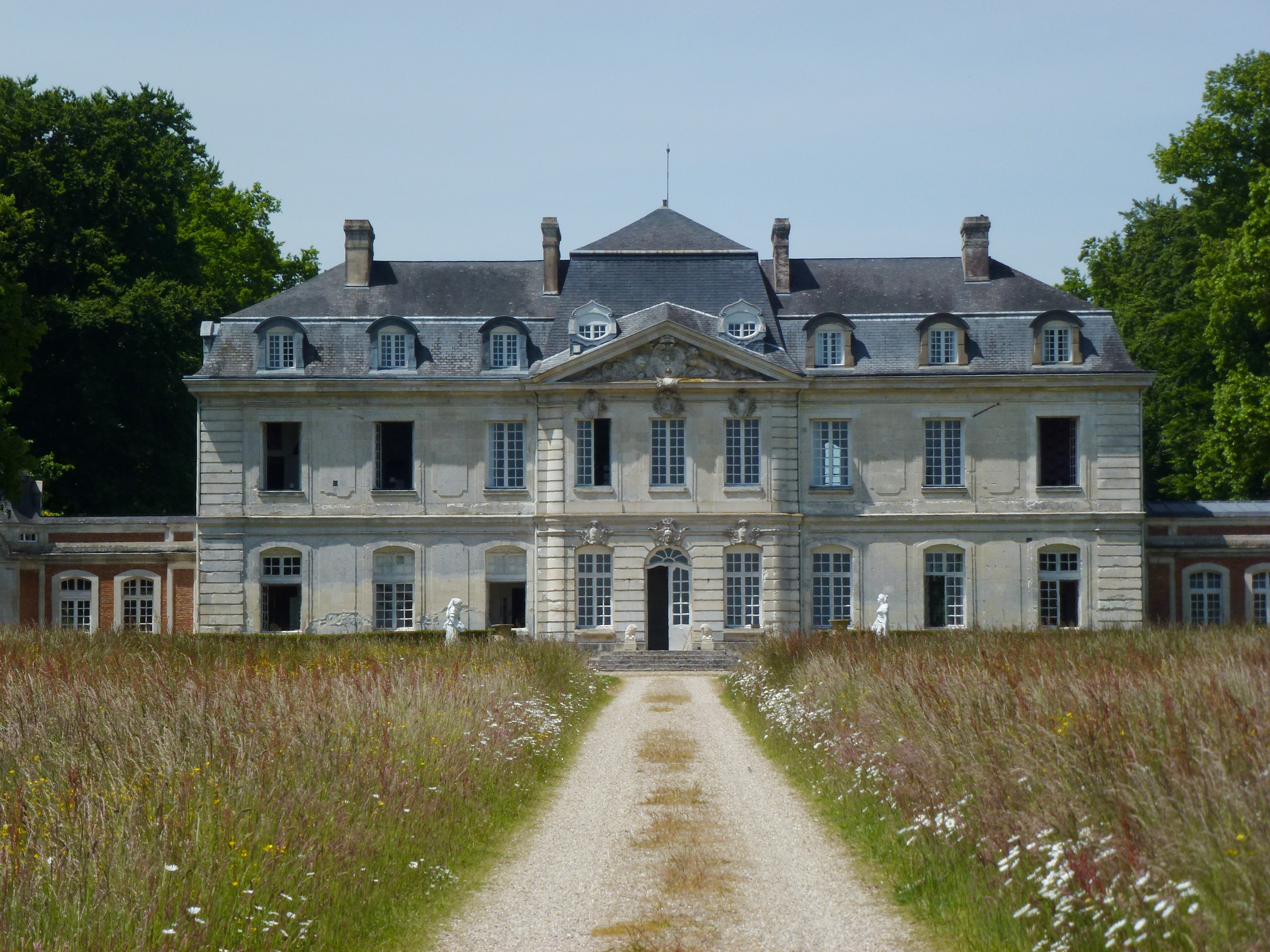
- Chateau of Launay

- Coat of arms
- Location of Saint-Georges-du-Vièvre
- Location within France Location within Normandy
- Coordinates: 49°14′40″N 0°35′09″E
- Country: France
- Region: Normandy
- Department: Eure
- Arrondissement: Bernay
- Canton: Beuzeville

Government
  - Mayor (2020–2026): Jean-Claude Quesnot
- Area^{1}: 10.19 km^{2} (3.93 sq mi)
- Elevation: 150 m (490 ft)
- Highest elevation: 188 m (617 ft)
- Lowest elevation: 94 m (308 ft)
- Population (2023): 894
  - Density: 87.7/km^{2} (227/sq mi)
- Time zone: UTC+01:00 (CET)
  - Summer (DST): UTC+02:00 (CEST)
- INSEE/Postal code: 27542 /27450
- ^{1} French Land Register data, which excludes lakes, ponds, glaciers > 1 km^{2} (0.386 sq mi or 247 acres) and river estuaries.

Saint-Georges-du-Vièvre (French pronunciation: [sɛ̃ ʒɔʁʒ dy vjɛvʁ]) is a commune in the Eure department in Normandy in northern France.

== Population ==
Historical population
Year	Pop.	±% p.a.
1968	706	—
1975	658	−1.00%
1982	556	−2.38%
1990	573	+0.38%
1999	640	+1.24%
2007	683	+0.82%
2012	781	+2.72%
2017	884	+2.51%
2023	894	+0.19%
Source: INSEE

== See also ==
- Communes of the Eure department
