= Denise Bernot =

French academic

Denise Bernot (4 February 1922 – 12 May 2016) was a French academic who was professor of Burmese at the Institut national des langues et civilisations orientales from 1960 to 1989. She was the widow of Lucien Bernot (1919–1993) who was professor at the Collège de France in the chair 'Sociographie de l'Asie du Sud-Est'. She was an alumna of the École des Chartes.

Denise Bernot died on 12 May 2016 at the age of 94.

== Bibliography ==
- (2004). Le rire de la terre : anthologie de nouvelles birmanes. Paris: Langues et mondes-l'Asiathèque.
- (2001) Manuel de Birman, Volume 2, Grammaire birmane (en collaboration avec Marie-Hélène Cardinaud et Marie Yin Yin Myint) (Collection Langues de l'Asie/INALCO), L'Asiathèque, Paris, ISBN 978-2-911053-76-4
- (1997) Dictionnaire français-birman, Denise Bernot, Cristina Cramerotti, Marie Yin Yin Myint L'Asiathèque. (Collection Dictionnaire Langues'O) ISBN 2-911053-29-X
- (1995) Manuel de birman, avec Marie-Hélène Cardinaud, L'Asiathèque, (Collection Langues de l'Asie/INALCO) ISBN 2-901795-69-2
- (1978-1994) Dictionnaire birman-français, Denise Bernot (direction de l'ouvrage) avec la collaboration de U Sein Aye, Daw Yin Yin Myint et Sylvie Pasquet ...; revu par U Hla Tin et Daw Khin Mya Kyu, SELAF/Peteers (Collection : Langues et civilisations de l'Asie du Sud Est et du monde insulindien) 15 volumes de 200 à 300 pages chacun, publiés de 1978 à 1994.
- (1993) with Marie-Hélène Cardinaud, Marie Yin Yin Myint, Parlons birman: langue du Myanmar, Paris, L'Harmattan, ISBN 2-7384-2103-2
- (1982-1984) Bibliographie birmane, années 1960-1970 (partie méthodique : 2 volumes; partie auteurs : 2 volumes), Valbonne : CNRS.
- (1980) Le prédicat en birman parlé, Paris : Selaf. ISBN 978-2-85297-072-4
- (1971)et al.(rééd.), Génies, anges et démons : Égypte, Babylone, Israël, Islam, peuples altaïques, Inde, Birmanie, Asie du Sud-Est, Tibet, Chine, Éd. du Seuil, coll. « Sources orientales », Paris, 1971, 430 p.
- (1968) Bibliographie birmane - années 1950-1960, Paris : CNRS.
- (1965) "The vowel system of Arakanese and Tavoyan." Lingua 15: 463-474.
- (1958) Les Khyang des collines de Chittagong (Pakistan oriental). Matériaux pour l'étude linguistique des Chin, Paris : Plon, 1958 (en collaboration avec son mari Lucien Bernot).

== Works in honour of Denise Bernot ==
- Études birmanes en hommage à Denise Bernot, Presses de l'École française d'Extrême-Orient, 1998
- Film : "Denise Bernot, Langues, Savoirs, Savoir-faire de Birmanie" (31'), https://www.canal-u.tv/video/cnrs_ups2259/denise_bernot_langues_savoirs_savoir_faire_de_birmanie.21679
