= Cédric Coutouly =

French cyclist

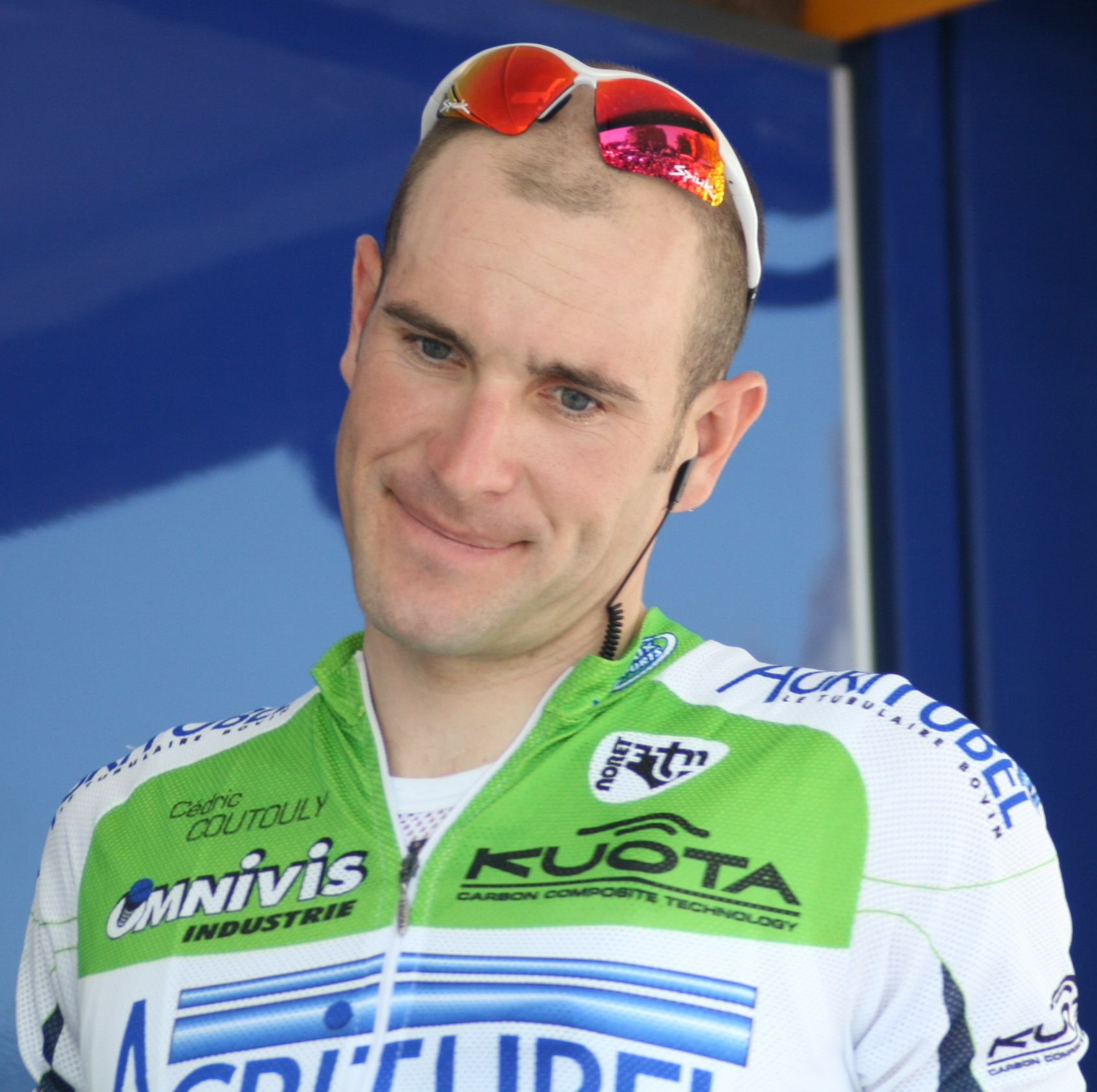

Personal information
- Full name: Cédric Coutouly
- Born: 16 January 1980 (age 46) Albi

Cycling career
- Sport: Cycling
- Discipline: Road
- Role: Rider

Amateur team
- 2002-2003: Crédit Agricole U23

Professional teams
- 2005-2008: Agritubel
- 2009-2010: Sojasun

Cedric Coutouly (born 16 January 1980 in Albi) is a former French cyclist. He participated in the 2006 Tour de France and finished in 131st place.

== Major results ==
2003
2nd Brussels Opwijk
2004
1st Overall Tour du Tarn-et-Garonne
2005
2nd Tro-Bro Léon
2006
2nd Paris–Camembert
2nd Paris–Troyes
4th Le Samyn
2010
1st Prologue Tour Alsace (TTT)
