= Lorberg =

Lorberg or Lohrberg is a German surname. For Baltic Germans of the Russian Empire the surname was transliterated as "Lorberg" from Russian: Лорберг. In Estonia it is spelled as Loorberg. Notable people with the surname include:

- August Lohrberg (1860–1936), German Social Democratic Party and trade union functionary
- Jekaterina Loorberg, birth of Ekaterina Kalinina, wife of Mikhail Kalinin, formally the head of the Soviet state
- Frank Lohrberg (born 1964) German landscape architect and university professor
- Henry A. Lorberg (1856–1943). American journalist, entrepreneur, and local historian
- Karl Lorberg (1891–1972), German politician (CDU) and Minister of Agriculture of Hesse
- Maria Loorberg, better known as Marina Lurs (1881 – 1922), Estonian strongwoman

== See also ==
- Lohrberg (Frankfurt am Main), a hill
