= Cyril Dessel =

French cyclist

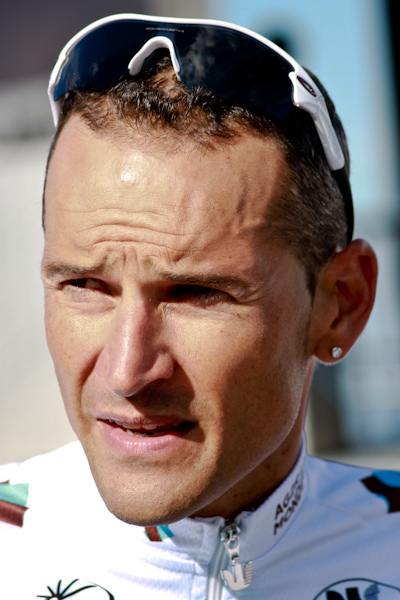
- Dessel at the 2011 Tour de l'Ain

Personal information
- Born: 29 November 1974 (age 51) Rive-de-Gier, France
- Height: 1.81 m (5 ft 11 in)
- Weight: 63 kg (139 lb)

Cycling career
- Sport: Cycling
- Current team: Retired
- Discipline: Road
- Role: Retired
- Rider type: Climber

Amateur team
- 1999: Casino–Ag2r Prévoyance (trainee)

Professional teams
- 2000–2002: Jean Delatour
- 2003–2004: Phonak
- 2005–2011: AG2R Prévoyance

Cyril Dessel (born 29 November 1974 in Rive-de-Gier, Loire) is a French former professional road racing cyclist, who competed as a professional from 2000 to 2011.

In 2006, he won the Tour Méditerranéen on the UCI Europe Tour. Then in the 2006 Tour de France, he finished second in the tenth stage, taking the leader's yellow jersey for a day and the lead in the King of the Mountains competition; he eventually finished sixth. In 2008, he won the 16th stage of the Tour after being in a chase group most of the day, beating David Arroyo, Yaroslav Popovych and Sandy Casar.

Dessel competed for France at the 2008 Summer Olympics.

== Career achievements ==
=== Major results ===
2002
3rd Grand Prix d'Ouverture
2003
9th Overall Critérium du Dauphiné Libéré
2004
2nd Road race, National Road Championships
8th Overall Ronde van Nederland
2006
6th Overall Tour de France

Held after Stage 10
Held after Stage 10
2nd Stage 10

1st Overall, Tour Méditerranéen

1st Stage 4

1st Overall Tour de l'Ain

1st Stage 1
1st Points classification

2008
1st Stage 3 Volta a Catalunya
1st Stage 16 Tour de France
6th Overall Critérium du Dauphiné Libéré

1st Stage 4

9th Overall Four Days of Dunkirk

1st Stage 5

=== Grand Tour general classification results timeline ===
Grand Tour	2002	2003	2004	2005	2006	2007	2008	2009	2010	2011
Giro d'Italia	—	—	—	—	—	—	—	—	—	99
Tour de France	113	—	—	—	6	DNF	28	DNF	—	—
Vuelta a España	99	DNF	—	—	DNF	—	—	—	—	60

DNF=Did not finish
