= Benoît Vaugrenard =

French road racing cyclist

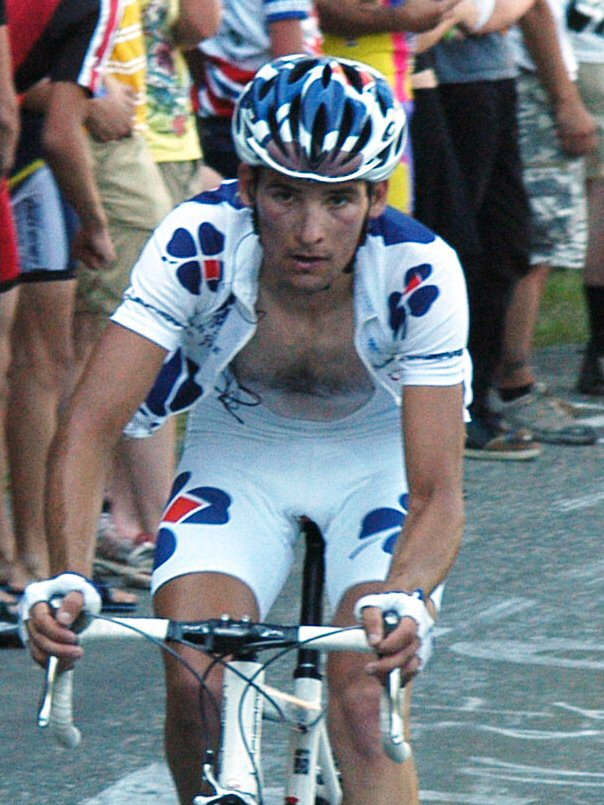
- Vaugrenard at the 2007 Tour de France

Personal information
- Full name: Benoît Vaugrenard
- Born: 5 January 1982 (age 44) Vannes, France
- Height: 1.85 m (6 ft 1 in)
- Weight: 72 kg (159 lb)

Cycling career
- Sport: Cycling
- Current team: Groupama–FDJ United
- Discipline: Road
- Role: Rider (retired); Directeur sportif
- Rider type: Rouleur

Amateur team
- 2002: Française des Jeux (stagiaire)

Professional team
- 2003–2019: FDJeux.com

Managerial team
- 2022–: Groupama–FDJ (directeur sportif)

Major wins
- National Time Trial Championships (2007)

Benoît Vaugrenard (French pronunciation: [bənwa vogʁənaʁ]; born 5 January 1982) is a French former road racing cyclist, who competed professionally for FDJeux.com and its successors between 2003 and 2019. During his professional career, Vaugrenard took eight victories and competed in eleven Grand Tours: six times in the Tour de France, three times in the Giro d'Italia (2004, 2016, and 2017) and twice in the Vuelta a España (2005 and 2012).

In 2022, Vaugrenard became a directeur sportif with Groupama–FDJ.

== Major results ==
2003
6th Tour du Finistère
2005
2nd Paris–Bourges
5th Tour du Finistère
7th Tour de Vendée
2006
6th Overall Circuit de la Sarthe

1st Young rider classification

2007
1st Time trial, National Road Championships
1st Polynormande
3rd Paris–Camembert
5th Tour du Finistère
7th Overall Circuit de la Sarthe
2008
1st Overall Tour du Poitou-Charentes

1st Stage 3

1st Stage 4 Tour du Limousin
2nd Route Adélie de Vitré
3rd Paris–Camembert
4th Overall Circuit de la Sarthe
6th Grand Prix de Wallonie
8th Overall Critérium International
2009
1st Grand Prix d'Isbergues
3rd Overall Circuit de la Sarthe
6th Route Adélie de Vitré
8th Liège–Bastogne–Liège
10th Brabantse Pijl
10th Paris–Camembert
2010
1st Stage 1 Volta ao Algarve
1st Stage 5 Four Days of Dunkirk
3rd Route Adélie de Vitré
5th Tour de la Somme
6th Polynormande
2012
5th Tour de Vendée
2014
4th Boucles de l'Aulne
2018
2nd Route Adélie de Vitré

=== Grand Tour general classification results timeline ===
| Grand Tour | 2004 | 2005 | 2006 | 2007 | 2008 | 2009 | 2010 | 2011 | 2012 | 2013 | 2014 | 2015 | 2016 | 2017 |
|---|---|---|---|---|---|---|---|---|---|---|---|---|---|---|
| Giro d'Italia | 135 | — | — | — | — | — | — | — | — | — | — | — | 91 | 103 |
| Tour de France | — | — | 85 | 83 | 80 | 142 | 96 | — | — | — | — | 113 | — | — |
| Vuelta a España | — | 126 | — | — | — | — | — | — | 136 | — | — | — | — | — |

Legend
| — | Did not compete |
| DNF | Did not finish |
