= 2008 Tour de France, Stage 12 to Stage 21 =

Cycling race stages

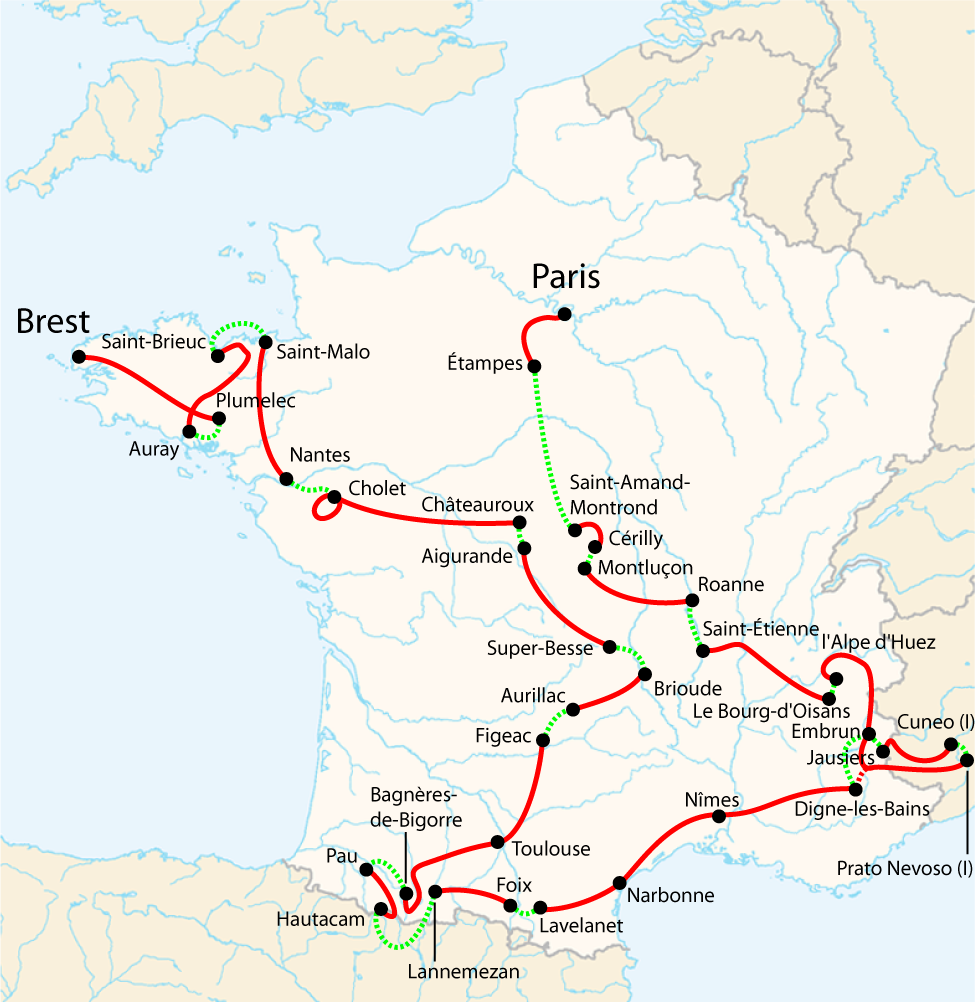
Stages in 2008

These are the profiles for the individual stages in the 2008 Tour de France, with Stage 12 on 17 July, and Stage 21 on 27 July.

== Stages ==
=== Stage 12 ===
Stage 12 profile

17 July 2008 — Lavelanet to Narbonne, 168 km

This stage featured one fourth category climb over the Col du Camperié east of Axat after 111 km, before a long rapid descent to Narbonne, which was expected to give the sprinters the chance to demonstrate their skills.

The day began with news of the withdrawal from the Tour of the Saunier Duval–Scott team after their leader Riccardo Riccò, who was top of both the King of the Mountains and Young Riders' categories, had failed a blood test taken at the end of Stage 4.

At the 40 kilometer mark, Samuel Dumoulin and Arnaud Gérard broke away, and attained a maximum advantage of 4 minutes. Juan José Oroz joined them at the 113 kilometer mark. The peloton didn't let them get very much of a lead, keeping the time gap at around a minute and a half for most of the race, until the catch occurred with about 9 kilometers to go. A bunched sprint saw Mark Cavendish win his third stage this tour.

Stage 12 result

Rank	Rider	Team	Time
1	Mark Cavendish (GBR)	Team Columbia	3 h 40 min 52 s
2	Sébastien Chavanel (FRA)	Française des Jeux	s.t.
3	Gert Steegmans (BEL)	Quick-Step	s.t.
4	Erik Zabel (GER)	Team Milram	s.t.
5	Óscar Freire (ESP)	Rabobank	s.t.
6	Francesco Chicchi (ITA)	Liquigas	s.t.
7	Thor Hushovd (NOR)	Crédit Agricole	s.t.
8	Leonardo Duque (COL)	Cofidis	s.t.
9	Julian Dean (NZL)	Garmin–Chipotle p/b H30	s.t.
10	Heinrich Haussler (GER)	Gerolsteiner	s.t.

General classification after stage 12

Rank	Rider	Team	Time
1	Cadel Evans (AUS)	Silence–Lotto	50 h 23 min 05 s
2	Fränk Schleck (LUX)	CSC–Saxo Bank	+ 1 s
3	Christian Vande Velde (USA)	Garmin–Chipotle p/b H30	+ 38 s
DSQ	~~Bernhard Kohl (AUT)~~	~~Gerolsteiner~~	~~+ 46 s~~
5	Denis Menchov (RUS)	Rabobank	+ 57 s
6	Carlos Sastre (ESP)	CSC–Saxo Bank	+ 1 min 28 s
7	Kim Kirchen (LUX)	Team Columbia	+ 1 min 56 s
8	Vladimir Efimkin (RUS)	Ag2r–La Mondiale	+ 2 min 32 s
9	Mikel Astarloza (ESP)	Euskaltel–Euskadi	+ 3 min 51 s
10	(Italy) Vincenzo Nibali	Liquigas	+ 4 min 18 s

=== Stage 13 ===
Stage 13 profile

18 July 2008 — Narbonne to Nîmes, 182 km

A series of fourth category climbs took the riders through Languedoc, before the run into Nîmes on this transitional stage before the riders move into the Alps.

This stage was remarkably similar to the one from the day before. An early breakaway, by Niki Terpstra and Florent Brard led almost the entire day until being caught in the final 10 kilometers. Another bunched sprint saw Mark Cavendish win yet again, but beyond that, eight of the top ten placed riders were the same both days, with three (including Cavendish) in the same exact position. Cavendish became the first sprinter to win four stages at a single Tour de France since Alessandro Petacchi did so in 2003, although Lance Armstrong won five of the last eight stages in the 2004 Tour de France including two individual time trials and three mountain stages.

Stage 13 result

Rank	Rider	Team	Time
1	Mark Cavendish (GBR)	Team Columbia	4 h 25 min 42 s
2	Robbie McEwen (AUS)	Silence–Lotto	s.t.
3	Romain Feillu (FRA)	Agritubel	s.t.
4	Heinrich Haussler (GER)	Gerolsteiner	s.t.
5	Óscar Freire (ESP)	Rabobank	s.t.
6	Thor Hushovd (NOR)	Crédit Agricole	s.t.
7	Leonardo Duque (COL)	Cofidis	s.t.
8	Erik Zabel (GER)	Team Milram	s.t.
9	Julian Dean (NZL)	Garmin–Chipotle p/b H30	s.t.
10	Sébastien Chavanel (FRA)	Française des Jeux	s.t.

General classification after stage 13

Rank	Rider	Team	Time
1	Cadel Evans (AUS)	Silence–Lotto	54 h 48 min 47 s
2	Fränk Schleck (LUX)	CSC–Saxo Bank	+ 1 s
3	Christian Vande Velde (USA)	Garmin–Chipotle p/b H30	+ 38 s
DSQ	~~Bernhard Kohl (AUT)~~	~~Gerolsteiner~~	~~+ 46 s~~
5	Denis Menchov (RUS)	Rabobank	+ 57 s
6	Carlos Sastre (ESP)	CSC–Saxo Bank	+ 1 min 28 s
7	Kim Kirchen (LUX)	Team Columbia	+ 1 min 56 s
8	Vladimir Efimkin (RUS)	Ag2r–La Mondiale	+ 2 min 32 s
9	Mikel Astarloza (ESP)	Euskaltel–Euskadi	+ 3 min 51 s
10	Vincenzo Nibali (ITA)	Liquigas	+ 4 min 18 s

=== Stage 14 ===
19 July 2008 — Nîmes to Digne-les-Bains, 194.5 km

Stage 14 profile

The race approached the Alps through the Vaucluse department crossing two fourth category climbs before dropping down to Digne-les-Bains.

A break of 21 riders, with representatives from all but three of the teams, moved away after 5 km. Only four riders remained clear by the 41st kilometer; Bram Tankink, Sandy Casar, William Bonnet and José Iván Gutiérrez. They were eventually caught on the last climb, and on the descent there were many splits in the field. Of many attempted breaks on the descent towards the finish, Sylvain Chavanel came closest to success, but the stage again finished in a sprint. Cavendish had been dropped from the peloton on the climb, and points classification leader Óscar Freire won the sprint.

Stage 14 result

Rank	Rider	Team	Time
1	Óscar Freire (ESP)	Rabobank	4 h 13 min 08 s
2	Leonardo Duque (COL)	Cofidis	s.t.
3	Erik Zabel (GER)	Team Milram	s.t.
4	Julian Dean (NZL)	Garmin–Chipotle p/b H30	s.t.
5	Steven de Jongh (NED)	Quick-Step	s.t.
6	Alessandro Ballan (ITA)	Lampre	s.t.
7	Rubén Pérez (ESP)	Euskaltel–Euskadi	s.t.
8	Jérôme Pineau (FRA)	Bouygues Télécom	s.t.
9	Matteo Tosatto (ITA)	Quick-Step	s.t.
10	Thor Hushovd (NOR)	Crédit Agricole	s.t.

General classification after stage 14

Rank	Rider	Team	Time
1	Cadel Evans (AUS)	Silence–Lotto	59 h 01 min 55 s
2	Fränk Schleck (LUX)	CSC–Saxo Bank	+ 1 s
3	Christian Vande Velde (USA)	Garmin–Chipotle p/b H30	+ 38 s
DSQ	~~Bernhard Kohl (AUT)~~	~~Gerolsteiner~~	~~+ 46 s~~
5	Denis Menchov (RUS)	Rabobank	+ 57 s
6	Carlos Sastre (ESP)	CSC–Saxo Bank	+ 1 min 28 s
7	Kim Kirchen (LUX)	Team Columbia	+ 1 min 56 s
8	Vladimir Efimkin (RUS)	Ag2r–La Mondiale	+ 2 min 32 s
9	Mikel Astarloza (ESP)	Euskaltel–Euskadi	+ 3 min 51 s
10	Vincenzo Nibali (ITA)	Liquigas	+ 4 min 18 s

=== Stage 15 ===
20 July 2008 — Embrun to Prato Nevoso (Italy), 183 km

Stage 15 profile

The 15th stage was due to start at Digne-les-Bains but due to the risk of rock falls in the climb up the Col de Larche, the organisers decided to modify the itinerary. The stage started instead from Embrun and headed to Prato Nevoso, crossing into Italy via the climb over the hors catégorie Col Agnel (2,744 m). The finish at Prato Nevoso is rated First Category with an 11.4 km climb at an average of 6.9%.

The road conditions at the start in Embrun were terrible, with consistent rain soaking the road. After several attempts earlier, Egoi Martínez, José Luis Arrieta, Danny Pate, and Simon Gerrans broke away from the peloton at the 12 kilometer mark, just before the first intermediate sprint. The peloton was content to let them go up the Col Agnel well ahead, as their maximum advantage was almost fourteen minutes before the summit. When the peloton's relatively lax pace finally quickened, the autobus formed in back of it on the way up the Col Agnel. Martinez was the first over the top.

The peloton consolidated on the descent, but for an unusual reason – Robert Hunter and Óscar Pereiro clipped wheels and crashed, with Pereiro dramatically tumbling through a barricade from one section of the road down to a lower section. This happened at the front of the main group, and afterwards for several kilometers the peloton slowed nearly to the pace they'd had in the rain-soaked neutral zone. The time gap to the four leaders rose from eleven and a half to over seventeen minutes in this time. Pereiro broke his arm in the crash, and had to abandon. The field similarly slowed, affording more time to the breakaway, after a crash (which involved Christian Vande Velde, Damiano Cunego, Vincenzo Nibali, Sebastian Lang, and others) on both sides of a roundabout at the 60 kilometers to go mark. At that point, it was calculated that the peloton had no chance to catch the break, so the peloton stayed together, with the contenders poising to attack on the climb up to Prato Nevoso.

Team CSC Saxo Bank set a blistering pace on the way up the Colle del Morte and again up to Prato Nevoso, splitting the field and trying to isolate Cadel Evans. The yellow jersey group thinned to ten riders, including the top six in the GC, as the CSC domestiques dropped off. On the way up to Prato Nevoso, Martinez attacked the other leaders and Arrieta was dropped. The favorites traded attacks and split as well on the way up.

Gerrans won the sprint to the line. Bernhard Kohl, Carlos Sastre, Denis Menchov and Alejandro Valverde came clear of Evans' group on the way to the finish. Fränk Schleck came clear of Evans in the last 100m to claim the yellow jersey, with Kohl narrowly failing to have taken enough time out of them both.

Stage 15 result

Rank	Rider	Team	Time
1	Simon Gerrans (AUS)	Crédit Agricole	4 h 50 min 44 s
2	Egoi Martínez (ESP)	Euskaltel–Euskadi	+ 3 s
3	Danny Pate (USA)	Garmin–Chipotle p/b H30	+ 10 s
4	José Luis Arrieta (ESP)	Ag2r–La Mondiale	+ 55 s
DSQ	~~Bernhard Kohl (AUT)~~	~~Gerolsteiner~~	~~+ 4 min 03 s~~
6	Carlos Sastre (ESP)	CSC–Saxo Bank	+ 4 min 03 s
7	Alejandro Valverde (ESP)	Caisse d'Epargne	+ 4 min 12 s
8	Denis Menchov (RUS)	Rabobank	+ 4 min 23 s
9	Fränk Schleck (LUX)	CSC–Saxo Bank	+ 4 min 41 s
10	Christian Vande Velde (USA)	Garmin–Chipotle p/b H30	+ 4 min 43 s

General classification after stage 15

Rank	Rider	Team	Time
1	Fränk Schleck (LUX)	CSC–Saxo Bank	63 h 57 min 21 s
DSQ	~~Bernhard Kohl (AUT)~~	~~Gerolsteiner~~	~~+ 7 s~~
3	Cadel Evans (AUS)	Silence–Lotto	+ 8 s
4	Denis Menchov (RUS)	Rabobank	+ 38 s
5	Christian Vande Velde (USA)	Garmin–Chipotle p/b H30	+ 39 s
6	Carlos Sastre (ESP)	CSC–Saxo Bank	+ 49 s
7	Kim Kirchen (LUX)	Team Columbia	+ 2 min 48 s
8	Vladimir Efimkin (RUS)	Ag2r–La Mondiale	+ 3 min 36 s
9	Alejandro Valverde (ESP)	Caisse d'Epargne	+ 4 min 11 s
10	Samuel Sánchez (ESP)	Euskaltel–Euskadi	+ 4 min 34 s

=== Rest Day 2 ===
21 July 2008

=== Stage 16 ===
22 July 2008 — Cuneo (Italy) to Jausiers, 157 km

Stage 16 profile

The race returned to France on this short stage, via the hors catégorie Col de la Lombarde and Col de la Bonette (the highest pass in Europe at over 2,800 m altitude), before a descent of more than 20 km.

Five riders, Samuel Dumoulin, Christophe Le Mével, Sébastien Rosseler, and former classification leaders Stefan Schumacher and Thomas Voeckler came clear of the peloton after 42 kilometers. Twenty-four riders also came clear as a chase shortly thereafter, splitting the field well before the climb up the Col de la Lombarde began. Riders were dropped and attacked from the various groups and the field split into numerous fragments, until Schumacher was the only leader left. He stayed well clear of the trailing groups and actually gained time to be the first over the Lombarde. The others from the breakaway, aside from Schumacher, were eventually absorbed by the chases.

The field split even more on the way up the Col de la Bonette, to the point where it was difficult to call any particular group the peloton. Christian Vande Velde was the first GC contender to be dropped from the yellow jersey group, cracked by the pacemaking being done by Andy Schleck. A chase group paced by Cyril Dessel and Yaroslav Popovych caught Schumacher some 3 kilometers before the summit of the Bonette. John-Lee Augustyn, attacked from this group shortly before the summit and was the first to reach the top. He later skidded off the road and tumbled down a steep decline on the dirt beside it, losing his bike. He had no choice but to wait for a service car with a spare machine, and thus lost the chance to rejoin the leading group.

The leading group was whittled to four on the descent – Popovych, Dessel, David Arroyo and Sandy Casar. Denis Menchov was dropped from the yellow jersey group early on in the descent, and lost time. This brought Cadel Evans forward to make the pace in the yellow jersey group, to put as much time as possible between them and Menchov, since Menchov was likely Evans' biggest threat in the individual time trial that was to come and thus in all likelihood, for the Tour title itself. Popovych tried to open the sprint at just over 1 kilometer to go, but the others got him back. Dessel eventually took down the run to the line.

Stage 16 result

Rank	Rider	Team	Time
1	Cyril Dessel (FRA)	Ag2r–La Mondiale	4 h 31 min 27 s
2	Sandy Casar (FRA)	Française des Jeux	s.t.
3	David Arroyo (ESP)	Caisse d'Epargne	s.t.
4	Yaroslav Popovych (UKR)	Silence–Lotto	+ 3 s
5	George Hincapie (USA)	Team Columbia	+ 24 s
6	Nicolas Portal (FRA)	Caisse d'Epargne	+ 24 s
7	Tadej Valjavec (SLO)	Ag2r–La Mondiale	+ 24 s
DSQ	~~Stefan Schumacher (GER)~~	~~Gerolsteiner~~	~~+ 1 min 03 s~~
9	Andy Schleck (LUX)	CSC–Saxo Bank	+ 1 min 28 s
DSQ	~~Bernhard Kohl (AUT)~~	~~Gerolsteiner~~	~~+ 1 min 28 s~~

General classification after stage 16

Rank	Rider	Team	Time
1	Fränk Schleck (LUX)	CSC–Saxo Bank	68 h 30 min 16 s
DSQ	~~Bernhard Kohl (AUT)~~	~~Gerolsteiner~~	~~+ 7 s~~
3	Cadel Evans (AUS)	Silence–Lotto	+ 8 s
4	Carlos Sastre (ESP)	CSC–Saxo Bank	+ 49 s
5	Denis Menchov (RUS)	Rabobank	+ 1 min 13 s
6	Christian Vande Velde (USA)	Garmin–Chipotle p/b H30	+ 3 min 15 s
7	Kim Kirchen (LUX)	Team Columbia	+ 3 min 23 s
8	Alejandro Valverde (ESP)	Caisse d'Epargne	+ 4 min 11 s
9	Samuel Sánchez (ESP)	Euskaltel–Euskadi	+ 4 min 38 s
10	Tadej Valjavec (SLO)	Ag2r–La Mondiale	+ 5 min 23 s

=== Stage 17 ===
23 July 2008 — Embrun to Alpe d'Huez, 210 km

Stage 17 profile

This was the last stage before the race left the Alps, with three hors catégorie climbs of the Col du Galibier (2,645 m.), the Col de la Croix de Fer (2,067 m.) and the final climb up the Alpe d'Huez (1,850 m.).

At the very beginning of the day's racing a breakaway started, with Rémy Di Gregorio, Rubén Pérez and Peter Velits, joined later by Stefan Schumacher. With three major cols, the field inevitably became very fractured, but this group stayed clear of the main contenders for much of the day, with Schumacher first over the Galibier, and Velits taking the Croix de Fer. By the base of the Alpe d'Huez, only Velits and Jérôme Pineau were in front of the elite riders, whose group then numbered about 12. At the bottom of this final ascent of the day Carlos Sastre attacked twice, tagged by Menchov on the 1st go before eventually breaking clear. His fellow Team CSC Saxo Bank members in the group, Andy and Fränk Schleck worked to interrupt any counterattacks on the way up to Alpe d'Huez, and Sastre finished two minutes clear to claim yellow from the older Schleck brother, and establish a lead that he might be able to sustain in the time trial to follow.

Stage 17 result

Rank	Rider	Team	Time
1	Carlos Sastre (ESP)	CSC–Saxo Bank	6 h 07 min 58 s
2	Samuel Sánchez (ESP)	Euskaltel–Euskadi	+ 2 min 03 s
3	Andy Schleck (LUX)	CSC–Saxo Bank	+ 2 min 03 s
4	Alejandro Valverde (ESP)	Caisse d'Epargne	+ 2 min 13 s
5	Fränk Schleck (LUX)	CSC–Saxo Bank	+ 2 min 13 s
6	Vladimir Efimkin (RUS)	Ag2r–La Mondiale	+ 2 min 15 s
7	Cadel Evans (AUS)	Silence–Lotto	+ 2 min 15 s
8	Denis Menchov (RUS)	Rabobank	+ 2 min 15 s
9	Christian Vande Velde (USA)	Garmin–Chipotle p/b H30	+ 2 min 15 s
DSQ	~~Bernhard Kohl (AUT)~~	~~Gerolsteiner~~	~~+ 2 min 15 s~~

General classification after stage 17

Rank	Rider	Team	Time
1	Carlos Sastre (ESP)	CSC–Saxo Bank	74 h 39 min 03 s
2	Fränk Schleck (LUX)	CSC–Saxo Bank	+ 1 min 24 s
DSQ	~~Bernhard Kohl (AUT)~~	~~Gerolsteiner~~	~~+ 1 min 33 s~~
4	Cadel Evans (AUS)	Silence–Lotto	+ 1 min 34 s
5	Denis Menchov (RUS)	Rabobank	+ 2 min 39 s
6	Christian Vande Velde (USA)	Garmin–Chipotle p/b H30	+ 4 min 41 s
7	Alejandro Valverde (ESP)	Caisse d'Epargne	+ 5 min 35 s
8	Samuel Sánchez (ESP)	Euskaltel–Euskadi	+ 5 min 52 s
9	Tadej Valjavec (SLO)	Ag2r–La Mondiale	+ 8 min 10 s
10	Vladimir Efimkin (RUS)	Ag2r–La Mondiale	+ 8 min 24 s

=== Stage 18 ===
24 July 2008 — Bourg-d'Oisans to Saint-Étienne, 197 km

Stage 18 profile

The race left the Alps and headed towards central France, with three rated climbs, including the second category Croix de Montvieux (811 m.) at 33 km from the finish.

At 30 kilometers in, Alexander Bocharov and Damiano Cunego crashed, with Cunego falling face-first into a road obstruction. He lay on the road for seven minutes before remounting his bike, falling ten minutes behind the peloton, with four teammates remaining with him for the rest of the stage. After 68 km, Carlos Barredo made a break, prompting a reaction from Marcus Burghardt and Christophe Le Mével. After 81 km, Burghardt caught up with Barredo, meanwhile, Mikel Astarloza and Romain Feillu joined Le Mével, about four minutes behind the leaders. These time gaps held up to the start of the Croix de Montvieux, at which point the breakaway appeared uncatchable.

The four main groups on the road continued up the final climb with time gaps remaining relatively unchanged. Barredo and Burghardt traded several attacks to the top of this climb and after it but Burghardt won a late, tense dash to the line. Feillu lead the next group home for third place, while an attack by Roman Kreuziger, an attempt to gain time on young rider classification leader Andy Schleck, resulted in a group of five riders including both Schleck and Kreuziger finishing some 20 seconds in front of the peloton. Cunego and his team-mates finished last, with Cunego dropping six places to twentieth in the general classification.

Stage 18 result

Rank	Rider	Team	Time
1	Marcus Burghardt (GER)	Team Columbia	4 h 30 min 21 s
DSQ	~~Carlos Barredo (ESP)~~	~~Quick-Step~~	~~s.t.~~
3	Romain Feillu (FRA)	Agritubel	+ 3 min 33 s
4	Christophe Le Mével (FRA)	Crédit Agricole	+ 3 min 33 s
5	Mikel Astarloza (ESP)	Euskaltel–Euskadi	+ 3 min 35 s
6	Samuel Dumoulin (FRA)	Cofidis	+ 6 min 39 s
7	Cyril Dessel (FRA)	Ag2r–La Mondiale	+ 6 min 39 s
8	Roman Kreuziger (CZE)	Liquigas	+ 6 min 39 s
9	Leif Hoste (BEL)	Silence–Lotto	+ 6 min 39 s
10	Andy Schleck (LUX)	CSC–Saxo Bank	+ 6 min 39 s

General classification after stage 18

Rank	Rider	Team	Time
1	Carlos Sastre (ESP)	CSC–Saxo Bank	79 h 16 min 14 s
2	Fränk Schleck (LUX)	CSC–Saxo Bank	+ 1 min 24 s
DSQ	~~Bernhard Kohl (AUT)~~	~~Gerolsteiner~~	~~+ 1 min 33 s~~
4	Cadel Evans (AUS)	Silence–Lotto	+ 1 min 34 s
5	Denis Menchov (RUS)	Rabobank	+ 2 min 39 s
6	Christian Vande Velde (USA)	Garmin–Chipotle p/b H30	+ 4 min 41 s
7	Alejandro Valverde (ESP)	Caisse d'Epargne	+ 5 min 35 s
8	Samuel Sánchez (ESP)	Euskaltel–Euskadi	+ 5 min 52 s
9	Tadej Valjavec (SLO)	Ag2r–La Mondiale	+ 8 min 10 s
10	Vladimir Efimkin (RUS)	Ag2r–La Mondiale	+ 8 min 24 s

=== Stage 19 ===
25 July 2008 — Roanne to Montluçon, 165.5 km

Stage 19 profile

After two rated climbs in the first 42 km, this was an undulating route through the Allier department.

A four-man group, made up of Stefan Schumacher, Egoi Martínez, Alessandro Ballan and Pierrick Fédrigo, moved away from the peloton after 16 km and led over the climbs, but never got more than 1 min 5 s clear, and by 69 km the group had been caught. Nine kilometers later, Sylvain Chavanel made an attack, and Jérémy Roy bridged the gap to join him. This pair stayed clear for the rest of the stage, with Chavanel thereby becoming the rider to have spent the greatest distance in this tour as part of a breakaway. The group's maximum advantage of over five minutes was reduced to a little over one by the end of the stage, in which Chavanel held off Roy's sprint to win. The bunched sprint for the minor positions was won by the tour's youngest rider, Gerald Ciolek, but green jersey leader Óscar Freire gained enough points to all but ensure victory in that competition. All the main contenders for Tour victory remained in the peloton all day.

Stage 19 result

Rank	Rider	Team	Time
1	Sylvain Chavanel (FRA)	Cofidis	3 h 37 min 09 s
2	Jérémy Roy (FRA)	Française des Jeux	s.t.
3	Gerald Ciolek (GER)	Team Columbia	+ 1 min 13 s
4	Erik Zabel (GER)	Team Milram	+ 1 min 13 s
5	Heinrich Haussler (GER)	Gerolsteiner	+ 1 min 13 s
6	Leonardo Duque (COL)	Cofidis	+ 1 min 13 s
7	Filippo Pozzato (ITA)	Liquigas	+ 1 min 13 s
8	Thor Hushovd (NOR)	Crédit Agricole	+ 1 min 13 s
9	Robert Förster (GER)	Gerolsteiner	+ 1 min 13 s
10	Julian Dean (NZL)	Garmin–Chipotle p/b H30	+ 1 min 13 s

General classification after stage 19

Rank	Rider	Team	Time
1	(Spain) Carlos Sastre	CSC–Saxo Bank	82 h 54 min 36 s
2	Fränk Schleck (LUX)	CSC–Saxo Bank	+ 1 min 24 s
DSQ	~~Bernhard Kohl (AUT)~~	~~Gerolsteiner~~	~~+ 1 min 33 s~~
4	Cadel Evans (AUS)	Silence–Lotto	+ 1 min 34 s
5	Denis Menchov (RUS)	Rabobank	+ 2 min 39 s
6	Christian Vande Velde (USA)	Garmin–Chipotle p/b H30	+ 4 min 41 s
7	Alejandro Valverde (ESP)	Caisse d'Epargne	+ 5 min 35 s
8	Samuel Sánchez (ESP)	Euskaltel–Euskadi	+ 5 min 52 s
9	Tadej Valjavec (SLO)	Ag2r–La Mondiale	+ 8 min 10 s
10	Vladimir Efimkin (RUS)	Ag2r–La Mondiale	+ 8 min 24 s

=== Stage 20 ===
26 July 2008 — Cérilly to Saint-Amand-Montrond, 53 km (ITT)

Stage 20 profile

The second and final individual time trial followed rolling roads in the Allier and Cher departments.

Despite the work he had done for his team in the Alps, two-time world time trial champion Fabian Cancellara had the legs to set the first true time to beat, nearly two minutes clear of early leader Sebastian Lang at the intermediate time checks and the finish. Stefan Schumacher, winner of the first time trial in the Tour, exactly tied Cancellara at the first time check and caught Sylwester Szmyd, who started two minutes before him, after only 18 kilometers. He came 14 seconds clear of Cancellara at the third time check and finished 21 seconds better than the world champion at the line.

Roman Kreuziger took back over a minute from Andy Schleck in the race for the white jersey over the first two time checks, but missed winning the jersey at the end. Fränk Schleck seemed to be in poor form, losing considerable time as well as four places. Cadel Evans was unable to gain the time he needed on Carlos Sastre to regain yellow. Bernhard Kohl rode an unexpectedly good time trial, gaining slightly on Sastre and riding almost identically to Evans at the first two time checks, despite having fallen off the starthouse ramp before his ride began. Sastre was consistent and strong, riding one of his best ever time trials, catching Fränk Schleck and riding well enough to keep his yellow jersey for the ride to Paris.

Stage 20 result

Rank	Rider	Team	Time
DSQ	~~Stefan Schumacher (GER)~~	~~Gerolsteiner~~	~~1 h 03 min 50 s~~
1	Fabian Cancellara (SUI)	CSC–Saxo Bank	1h 04 min 11 s
2	Kim Kirchen (LUX)	Team Columbia	+ 40 s
3	Christian Vande Velde (USA)	Garmin–Chipotle p/b H30	+ 44 s
4	David Millar (GBR)	Garmin–Chipotle p/b H30	+ 1 min 16 s
5	Denis Menchov (RUS)	Rabobank	+ 1 min 34 s
6	Cadel Evans (AUS)	Silence–Lotto	+ 1 min 44 s
7	Sebastian Lang (GER)	Gerolsteiner	+ 1 min 58 s
DSQ	~~Bernhard Kohl (AUT)~~	~~Gerolsteiner~~	~~+ 2 min 00 s~~
9	George Hincapie (USA)	Team Columbia	+ 2 min 07 s

General classification after stage 20

Rank	Rider	Team	Time
1	Carlos Sastre (ESP)	CSC–Saxo Bank	84 h 01 min 00 s
2	Cadel Evans (AUS)	Silence–Lotto	+ 1 min 05 s
DSQ	~~Bernhard Kohl (AUT)~~	~~Gerolsteiner~~	~~+ 1 min 20 s~~
4	Denis Menchov (RUS)	Rabobank	+ 2 min 00 s
5	Christian Vande Velde (USA)	Garmin–Chipotle p/b H30	+ 3 min 12 s
6	Fränk Schleck (LUX)	CSC–Saxo Bank	+ 4 min 28 s
7	Samuel Sánchez (ESP)	Euskaltel–Euskadi	+ 6 min 32 s
8	Kim Kirchen (LUX)	Team Columbia	+ 7 min 02 s
9	Alejandro Valverde (ESP)	Caisse d'Epargne	+ 7 min 26 s
10	Tadej Valjavec (SLO)	Ag2r–La Mondiale	+ 9 min 12 s

=== Stage 21 ===
27 July 2008 — Étampes to Paris Champs-Élysées, 143 km

Stage 21 profile

This was a hilly course to Paris winding through the Chevreuse Valley before the traditional loop on the Champs-Élysées, Place de la Concorde and the Rue de Rivoli. Once again, the remaining sprinters completed the stage.

In keeping with tradition, the peloton took it easy on the way to the Champs-Élysées, with many riders taking time to smile for the cameras and enjoy some champagne courtesy of the team car of the victorious Team CSC Saxo Bank. Atop bicycles with new yellow handlebars, Team CSC led the field onto Champs-Élysées for the eight circuits over the famous cobblestone way. Beginning at the end of the first circuit, numerous riders tried to break away from the field, but none succeeded, and a classic bunched sprint saw Gert Steegmans win the race to the line. The field split in this final sprint, resulting in shifts of a few seconds in the final general classification.

Stage 21 result

Rank	Rider	Team	Time
1	Gert Steegmans (BEL)	Quick-Step	3 h 51 min 38 s
2	Gerald Ciolek (GER)	Team Columbia	s.t.
3	Óscar Freire (ESP)	Rabobank	s.t.
4	Robbie McEwen (AUS)	Silence–Lotto	s.t.
5	Thor Hushovd (NOR)	Crédit Agricole	s.t.
6	Julian Dean (NZL)	Garmin–Chipotle p/b H30	s.t.
DSQ	~~Stefan Schumacher (GER)~~	~~Gerolsteiner~~	~~s.t.~~
8	Robert Förster (GER)	Gerolsteiner	s.t.
9	Leonardo Duque (COL)	Cofidis	s.t.
10	Robert Hunter (RSA)	Barloworld	s.t.

Final General Classification

Rank	Rider	Team	Time
1	Carlos Sastre (ESP)	CSC–Saxo Bank	87 h 52 min 52 s
2	Cadel Evans (AUS)	Silence–Lotto	+ 58 s
DSQ	~~Bernhard Kohl (AUT)~~	~~Gerolsteiner~~	~~+ 1 min 13 s~~
3	Denis Menchov (RUS)	Rabobank	+ 2 min 10 s
4	Christian Vande Velde (USA)	Garmin–Chipotle p/b H30	+ 3 min 05 s
5	Fränk Schleck (LUX)	CSC–Saxo Bank	+ 4 min 28 s
6	Samuel Sánchez (ESP)	Euskaltel–Euskadi	+ 6 min 25 s
7	Kim Kirchen (LUX)	Team Columbia	+ 6 min 55 s
8	Alejandro Valverde (ESP)	Caisse d'Epargne	+ 7 min 12 s
9	Tadej Valjavec (SLO)	Ag2r–La Mondiale	+ 9 min 05 s
