= Col de la Lombarde =

Mountain pass on the France–Italy border

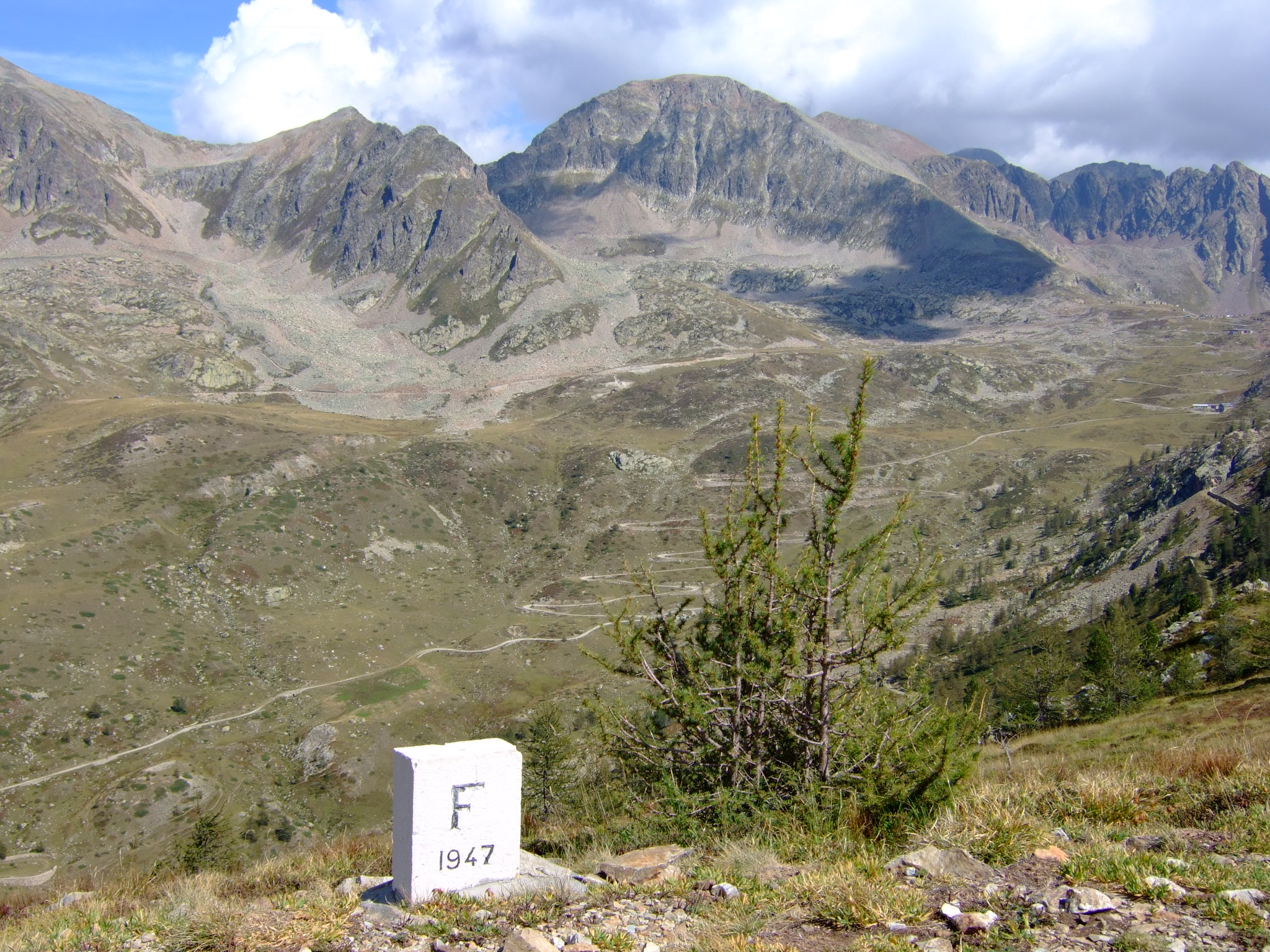
- A frontier marker on the col de la Lombarde

- Location within Alps
- Elevation: 2,351 metres (7,713 ft)
- Traversed by: SP.225 / D.97

Third Approach
- Location: Cuneo, Italy; Alpes-Maritimes, France
- Range: Alps
- Coordinates: 44°12′8″N 07°09′1″E

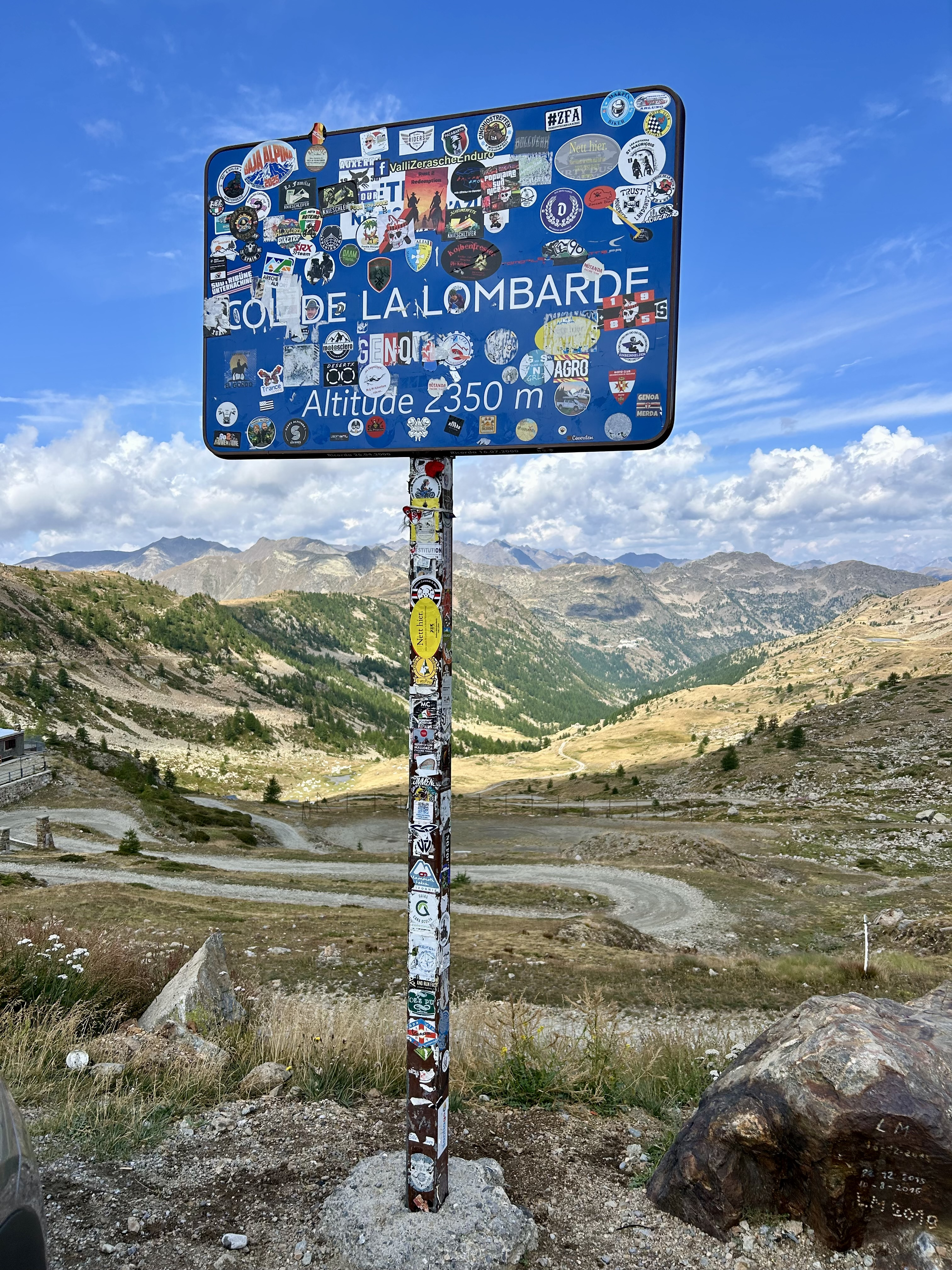

Col de la Lombarde (or Colle della Lombarda) (el. 2351 m.) is a high mountain pass above the ski resort of Isola 2000 on the border between France and Italy.

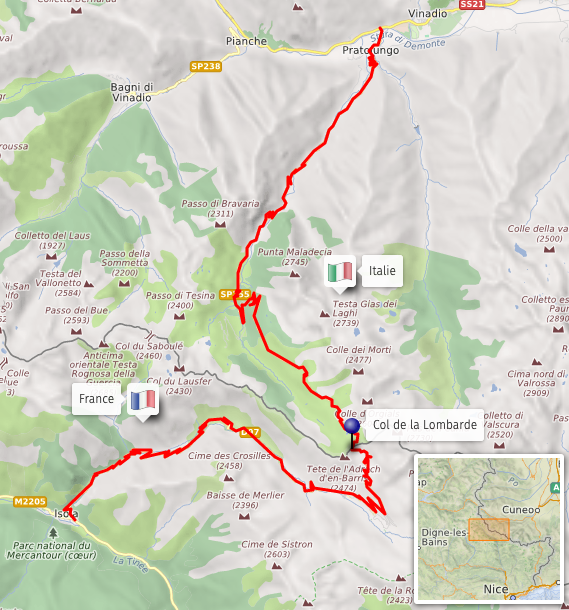
Map of Col de la Lombarde

== Details of the climb ==
From Italy, the climb starts at Vinadio and is 21.5 km long. Over this distance, the climb is 1447 m. (an average percentage of 6.8%), with the steepest sections at 9.1% (although some bends reach over 14%).

From France, the climb starts at Isola and is 21.2 km long. Over this distance, the climb is 1477 m. (an average percentage of 7%), with the steepest sections at 9.3% at the foot of the climb.

== Tour de France ==
The Tour de France crossed the pass for the first time in 2008, approaching from Italy via Vinadio on the 157 km sixteenth stage from Cuneo to Jausiers.

=== Appearances in Tour de France ===
Year	Stage	Category	Start	Finish	Leader at the summit
2008	16	HC	Cuneo	Jausiers	~~Stefan Schumacher (GER)~~ (Note: Schumacher was handed a two-year ban and stripped of all results from 2008 to 2010.)

== See also ==
- List of highest paved roads in Europe
- List of mountain passes
