= Col Agnel =

Mountain pass between France and Italy

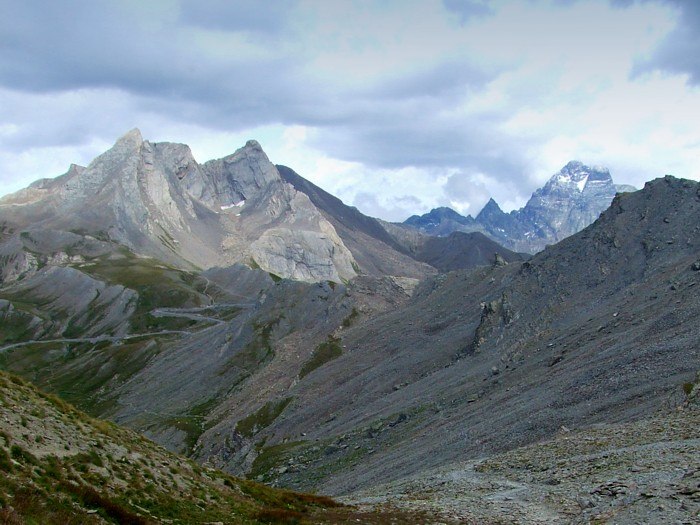

- Location within Alps
- Elevation: 2,744 m (9,003 ft)
- Traversed by: D205 / SP251

Location
- Location: Hautes-Alpes, France; Province of Cuneo, Italy
- Range: Cottian Alps
- Coordinates: 44°41′2″N 06°58′46″E

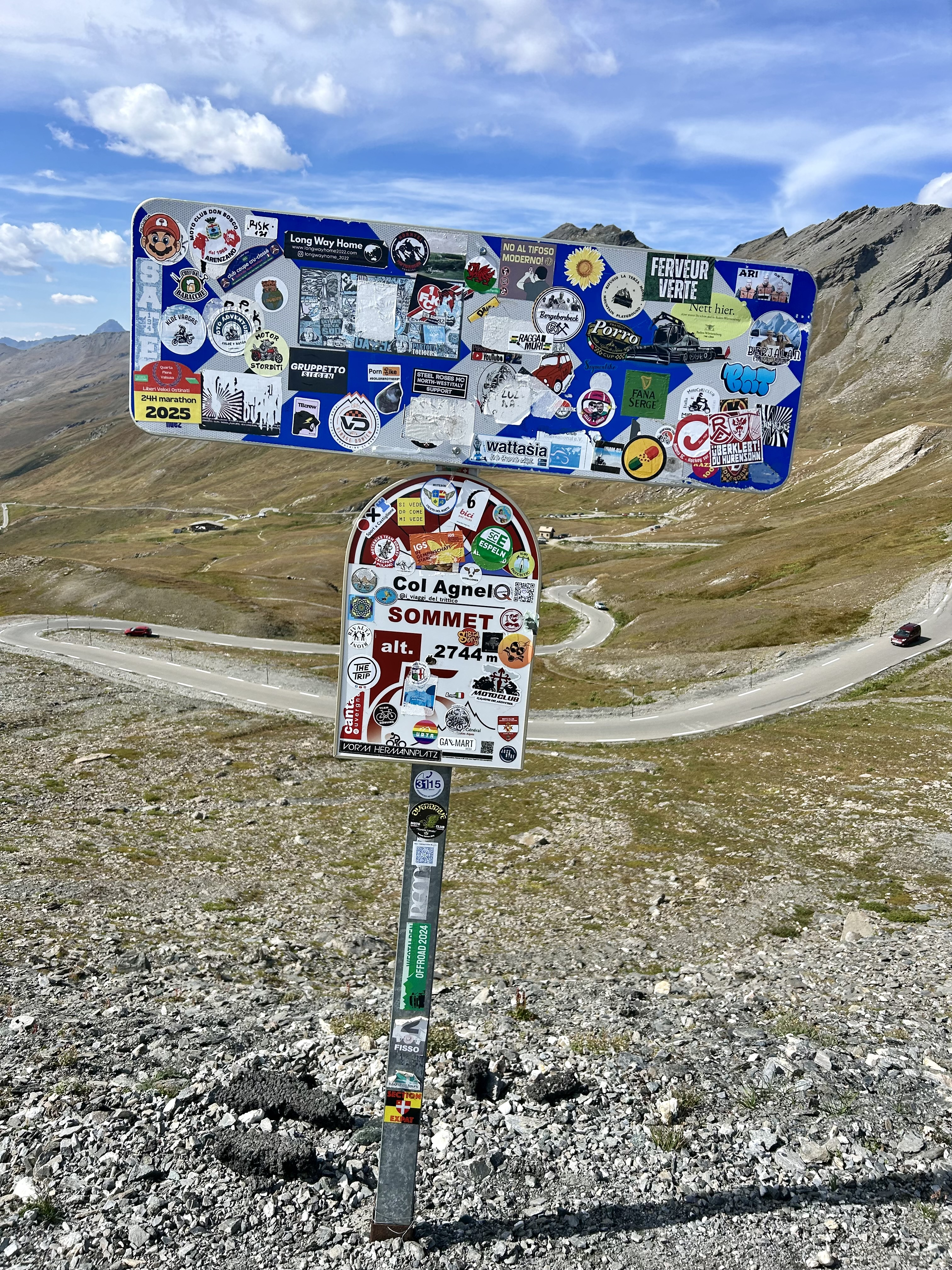
Col Agnel signpost

Col Agnel (Italian: Colle dell'Agnello) is a mountain pass in the Cottian Alps, west of Monte Viso between France and Italy which links the Queyras valley (Hautes-Alpes) with Pontechianale in the province of Cuneo, Piedmont.

At 2,744 m (9,003 ft), it is the third highest paved road pass of the Alps, after Stelvio Pass and Col de l'Iseran.

Despite being the highest international pass of the Alps, Col Agnel is somewhat unknown and not heavily used. It is one of the many passes suggested as the route taken by Hannibal in his march, with elephants, to attack Rome at the start of the Second Punic War and a modern-era plaque, mounted on a rock on the French side, commemorates the event.

== Cycling ==
From Château-Queyras (France), the climb is 20.5 km long at an average gradient of 6.6%. From Casteldelfino (Italy), the climb is 22.4 km long at an average gradient of 6.5%.

=== Tour de France ===
The Col Agnel was crossed for the first time on 20 July 2008 during stage 15 of the 2008 Tour de France. The Col Agnel was crossed for the Second Time on 21 July 2011 during Stage 18 of The 2011 Tour de France.

Year	Stage	Category	Start	Finish	Leader at the summit
2011	18	HC	Pinerolo	Serre-Chevalier	Maxim Iglinsky (KAZ)
2008	15	HC	Embrun	Prato Nevoso	Egoi Martínez (ESP)

=== Giro d'Italia ===
The Col Agnel has been crossed four times during Giro d'Italia.

Year	Stage	Category	Start	Finish	Leader at the summit
1994	20	1	Cuneo	Les Deux Alpes	Stefano Zanini (ITA)
2000	19	1	Saluzzo	Briançon	Chepe González (COL)
2007	12	1	Scalenghe	Briançon	Yoann Le Boulanger (FRA)
2016	19	1	Pinerolo	Risoul	Michele Scarponi (ITA)

== See also ==
- List of highest paved roads in Europe
- List of mountain passes
