= Prato Nevoso =

Italian ski resort

Coordinates: 44°15′24.11″N 7°47′20.58″E

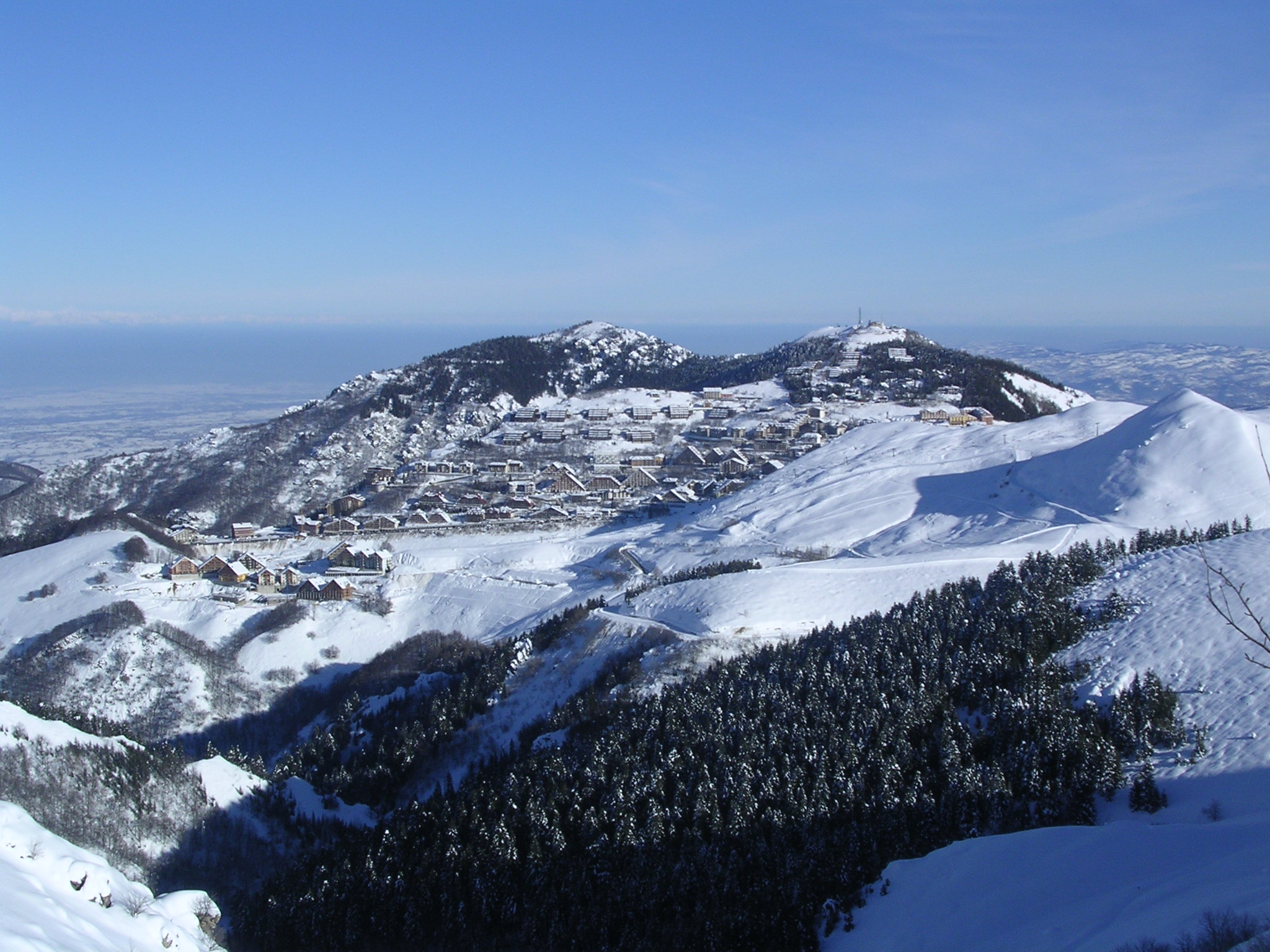
The resort in winter

Prato Nevoso (or Pratonevoso) is a ski and holiday resort in northern Italy. It is located at 1480 metres above sea level, in the province of Cuneo, Piedmont, within the municipal boundaries of the comune of Frabosa Sottana, of which it is a frazione, some four kilometres south of its centre. The resort's name means "snowy meadow" in Italian.

== History ==
Prato Nevoso's history as a resort dates back to the early 1960s, when a group of Ligurian entrepreneurs decided to create a resort easily accessible from Genoa and Turin.

The rapid building programme and the low initial costs of flats spurred tourism, as well as the presence of the A6 Turin-Savona motorway (enlarged during the 1990s). The expansion of the resort did not follow established principles of town planning, and buildings sprung up in somewhat anarchic fashion.

== Giro d'Italia ==
As well as winter sports, the resort is popular with cyclists and has been the finish of three stages of the Giro d'Italia:

Year	Stage	Start of stage	Distance (km)	Stage winner	Pink jersey
1996	13	Loano	115	Pavel Tonkov (RUS)	Pavel Tonkov (RUS)
2000	18	Genova	176	Stefano Garzelli (ITA)	Francesco Casagrande (ITA)
2018	18	Abbiategrasso	196	Maximilian Schachmann (GER)	Simon Yates (GBR)

== Tour de France ==
On July 20, 2008, the town served as the finish line for a stage in the 2008 Tour de France. The finish is rated First Category with an 11.4 km climb at an average of 6.9%.

=== Tour de France stage finishes ===
Year	Stage	Start of stage	Distance (km)	Category of climb	Stage winner	Yellow jersey
2008	15	Embrun	183	1	Simon Gerrans (AUS)	Fränk Schleck (LUX)
