= Bernhard Kohl =

Austrian cyclist (born 1982)

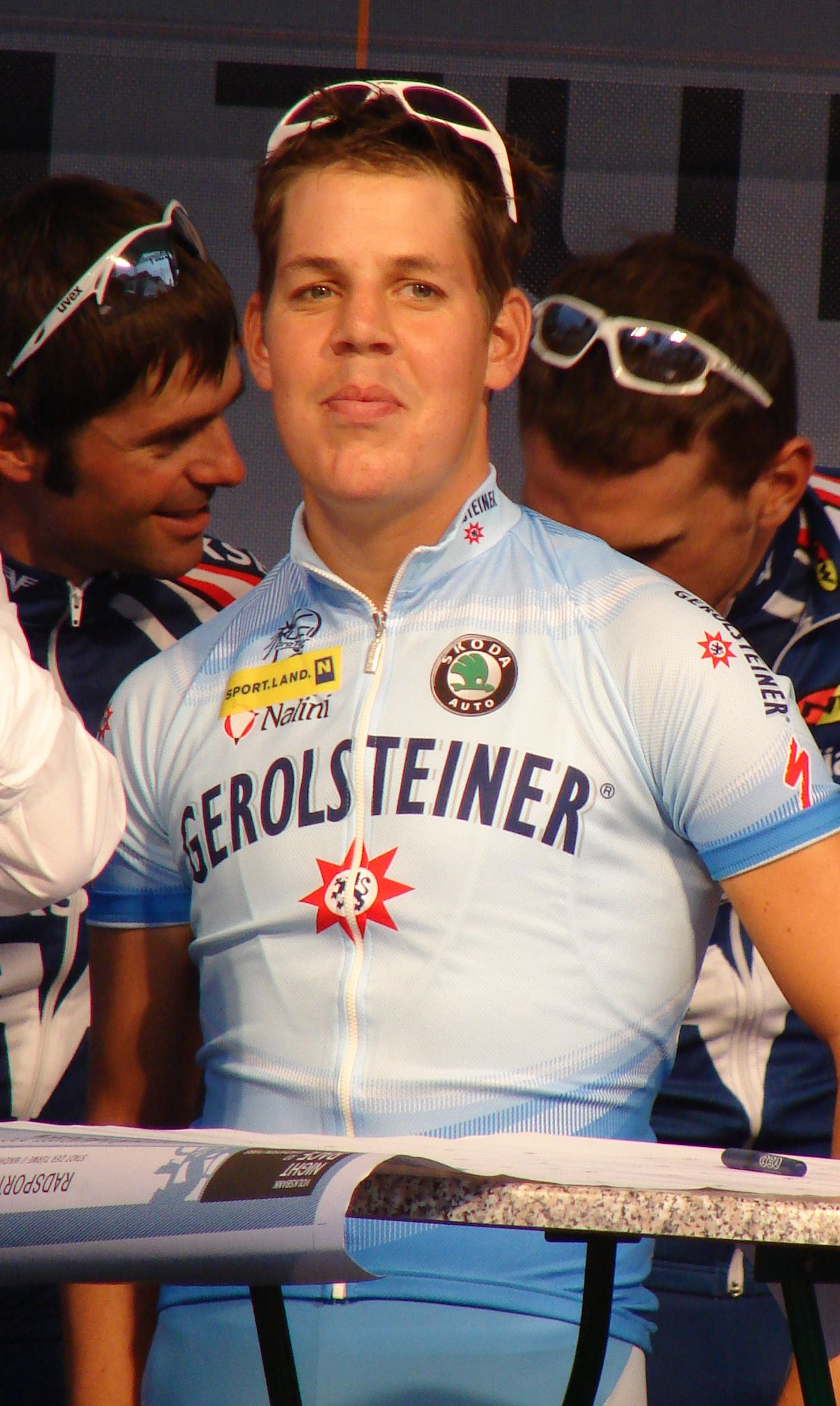
- Kohl in 2007

Personal information
- Full name: Bernhard Kohl
- Born: 4 January 1982 (age 44) Vienna, Austria
- Height: 1.72 m (5 ft 8 in)
- Weight: 61 kg (134 lb)

Cycling career
- Sport: Cycling
- Current team: Retired
- Discipline: Road
- Role: Rider
- Rider type: Climber

Amateur teams
- 2002: Elk Haus
- 2003–2004: Rabobank GSIII

Professional teams
- 2005–2006: T-Mobile Team
- 2007–2008: Gerolsteiner

Major wins
- One-day races and Classics National Road Race Championships (2006)

Bernhard Kohl (born 4 January 1982) is an Austrian former professional road bicycle racer and recognized climbing specialist. After the Gerolsteiner team announced they would not be in existence for the 2009 season, Kohl signed with UCI ProTeam Silence–Lotto for three years. His biggest career achievements include becoming the Austrian national road race champion in 2006, finishing third place overall in the Dauphiné Libéré and winning the mountains classification in the 2008 Tour de France. He was 73 seconds behind winner Carlos Sastre at the completion of the event, finishing in third place in the General classification.

He was banned from the sport for two years after testing positive for performance-enhancing drugs in October 2008. On 25 May 2009, he announced his retirement from the sport, claiming that it is "impossible to win without doping" in international cycling.

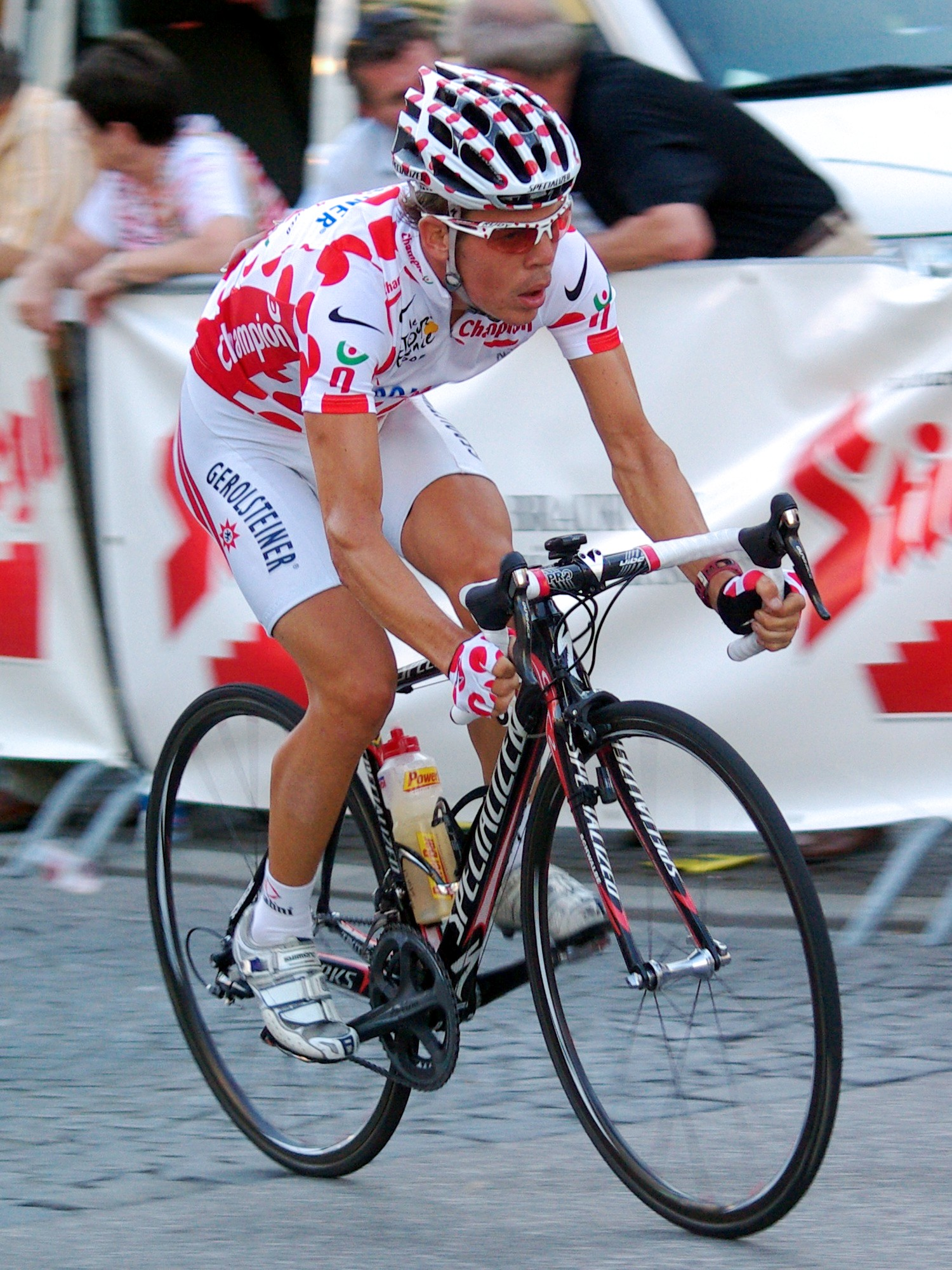
Bernhard Kohl wears the polka dot jersey of the Tour de France at the city centre criterium in Wels (Austria) on 30 July 2008

== Doping ==
On 13 October 2008, L'Équipe announced that Kohl had tested positive for CERA (continuous erythropoitin receptor activator, a third-generation variant of erythropoietin, aka EPO) used during the Tour de France. On the 15th he admitted his drug use. His results were removed, but his third-place finish in the 2008 Tour and his first place in the mountains classification have not been remade. If they ever are Denis Menchov of Rabobank would become the third-place finisher, while Carlos Sastre of CSC–Saxo Bank, overall winner of the Tour, would become winner of the mountains classification. The next day, Silence–Lotto terminated Kohl's contract with the team. Several journalists had also nominated Kohl to receive the Austrian Sportspersonality of the year award, but he was removed from the contenders list. On 24 November 2008, Kohl was banned for two years by the Austrian anti-doping agency (NADA).

His ex-manager, Stefan Matschiner, was arrested on 31 March 2009 in Austria and charged with selling doping substances. Kohl stated that he was "not surprised" by the arrest. In an exclusive interview with L'Équipe, the Austrian detailed how he "prepared" himself for the 2008 Tour and received blood transfusions from his manager during the event. The International Cycling Union 's (UCI) biological passport failed to prevent Kohl from practicing blood doping on a regular basis during his career, he said. "The top riders are so professional in their doping that they know very well they have to keep their blood values stable not to be detected".

Kohl's results for the 2008 Tour de France have been removed in the official Tour de France results, but the definitive classification has not been published yet.

== Major results ==
2000
3rd Overall Internationale Niedersachsen-Rundfahrt der Junioren
8th Overall Internationale Oberösterreich Rundfahrt Junioren
2002
1st Road race, National Under-23 Road Championships
1st Rund um den Henninger Turm Under-23
4th Road race, National Road Championships
6th Overall Grand Prix Guillaume Tell
7th Overall Uniqa Classic
2003
2nd Road race, National Under-23 Road Championships
2nd Overall Thüringen Rundfahrt
5th Road race, National Road Championships
5th Overall Triptyque Ardennais
10th Liège–Bastogne–Liège Espoirs
2004
1st Overall Tour des Pyrénées
4th Circuit de Wallonie
2005
7th Overall Tour of Austria
2006
1st Road race, National Road Championships
3rd Overall Critérium du Dauphiné Libéré
5th Overall Tour of Austria
2008
~~3rd Overall Tour de France~~

~~1st Mountains classification~~

6th Overall Bayern Rundfahrt

=== Grand Tour general classification results timeline ===
Grand Tour	2005	2006	2007	2008
Giro d'Italia	Did not contest during career			
Tour de France	—	—	31	~~3~~
Vuelta a España	111	DNF	—	—

Legend
—	Did not compete
DNF	Did not finish
~~No.~~	Voided result
