= John-Lee Augustyn =

South African cyclist (born 1986)

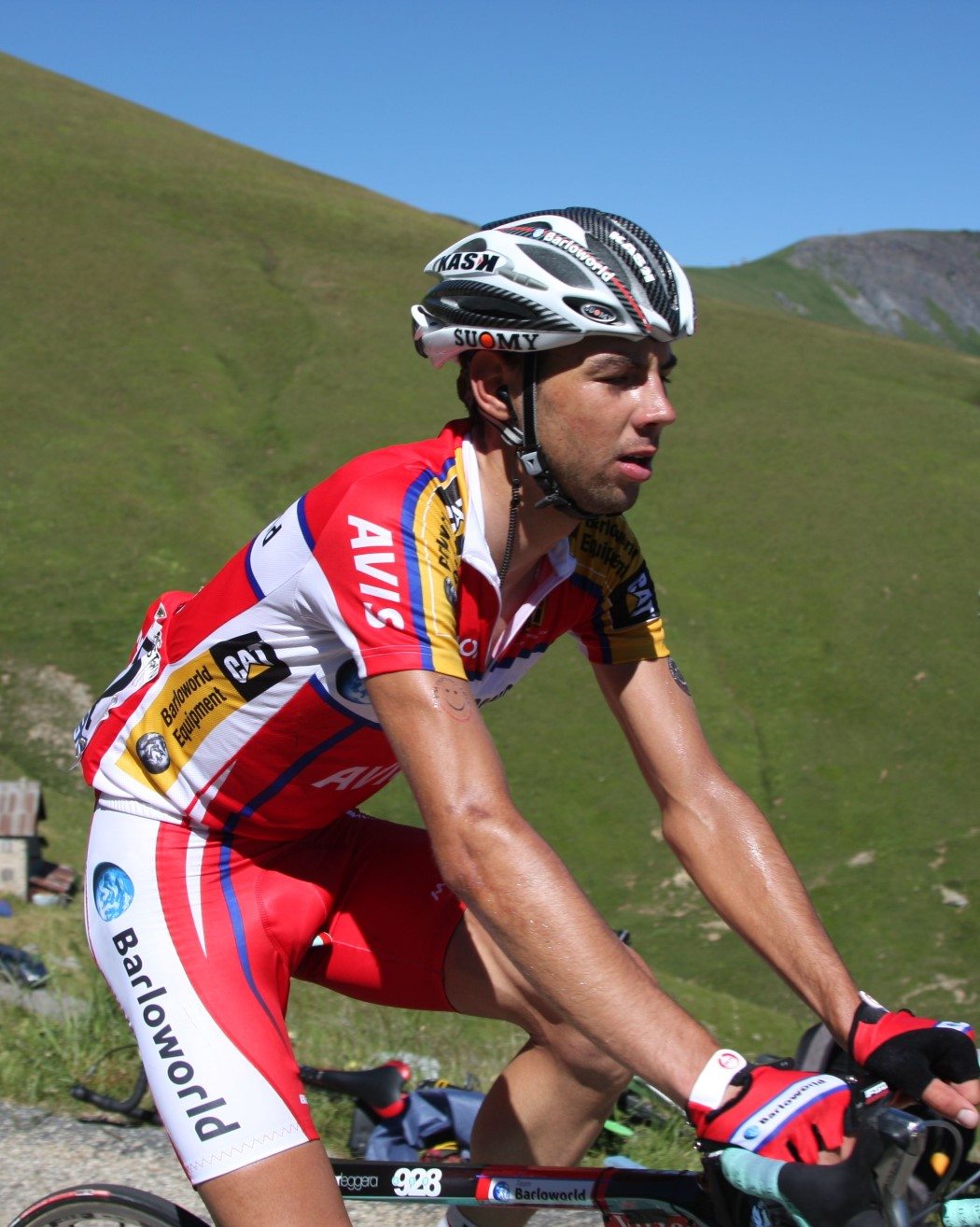
- Augustyn at the 2008 Tour de France

Personal information
- Full name: John-Lee Augustyn
- Born: 10 August 1986 (age 40) Kimberley, South Africa

Cycling career
- Sport: Cycling
- Discipline: Road
- Role: Rider
- Rider type: Climber

Professional teams
- 2005–2006: Team Konica Minolta
- 2007–2009: Barloworld
- 2010–2011: Team Sky
- 2012: Utensilnord–Named
- 2014: MTN–Qhubeka

John-Lee Augustyn (born 10 August 1986) is a South African former professional road bicycle racer. His former teams include Team Sky, Barloworld and MTN–Qhubeka. Following a hip resurfacing operation in 2011, he moved to the UCI Professional Continental team Utensilnord–Named, but continued to suffer problems, indicating the hip implant was not coping with the rigours of professional racing. Following medical advice announced in May 2012 that he was taking an indefinite break from professional cycling, Augustyn returned to the professional peloton in 2014 with the MTN–Qhubeka team.

== Tour de France 2008 ==
During Stage 16 of the 2008 Tour in his second professional year, John-Lee crested Cime de la Bonette in first place before shortly and spectacularly overshooting a hairpin bend on the descent. He was thrown from his bike, sliding 30 metres down the shale mountainside before recovering to complete the stage.

== Retirement ==
Following a comeback with the newly formed MTN–Qhubeka, Augustyn was forced to retire from professional cycling in May 2014 due to a persistent hip problem which originated in a crash at the 2007 Volta a Portugal, which caused avascular necrosis of the femoral head. On his retirement John-Lee vowed to give something back to the sport that he loved. Quickly gaining his UCI coaching acrreditions he was approached by a number of teams to help assist with coaching and mentoring younger neo pros. He spent the summer of 2015 in Europe working at some of the biggest races on the calendar. He now lives on Lago d'Iseo in Italy with his wife. He is often seen riding his SwiftCarbon bike, a brand he has been an ambassador for since 2015 for along with SAKO7 socks and cycling apparel.

== Major results ==
2005
1st Belgotex Classic Hill climb time trial
1st Karoo2005
2nd National Criterium Championships
10th Flèche Ardennaise
2006
1st Tour of Lesotho
1st Tshwabec Classic
1st SA National U-23 Road Championships
2nd Overall Tour of Japan

1st Mountains classification
1st Stage 4

2007
1st Mountains classification Volta ao Alentejo
3rd Overall Vuelta a Asturias
6th Overall Clásica Internacional de Alcobendas
7th Giro d'Oro
2008
8th Subida al Naranco
