= Hors catégorie =

In bicycle races, a climb "beyond categorization"

Hors catégorie (HC) is a French term used in stage bicycle races to designate a climb that is "beyond categorization". The term was originally used for those mountain roads where cars were not expected to be able to pass.

The HC climb is the most difficult type of climb in a race. It is more demanding than a Category 1 climb which in turn is more demanding than a Category 2 climb and so on. The easiest category is Category 4.

These five categories are defined by their steepness and length. In addition, their position on the route can play a role. For instance, a climb that would normally be a Category 1 climb can become a HC climb if it is the final climb of a stage.

The average HC climb in the Tour de France from 2012 to 2016 is 16.1 kilometers long and has a grade of 7.4%. There are around 7 HC climbs per Tour.

== History ==
When the mountains classification in the Tour de France originated in the 1933 Tour de France, there was only one type of mountain. Points were given to the first cyclists to cross the mountains, starting with 10 points for the first cyclist, going down to 1 point for the tenth cyclist. After the Second World War, in the 1947 Tour de France, the mountains were divided into two categories, the first and the second category. The first category mountains gave 10 points to the first cyclist, similar to before 1939, and the second category mountains gave only 5 points to the first cyclist.

The division in categories was successful, and two years later, in 1949, the third category was added. These were even smaller mountains, which gave 3 points to the cyclist reaching the peak first.

In 1962, the fourth category was added. The points system was also revised: the first category now gave 15 points for the first cyclist, the second category 10 points, the third category 5 points and the fourth category 3 points. Although the fourth category disappeared in 1963, it came back again in 1964. The system with four categories kept in place until 1978, although the points distribution changed over the years.

In 1979, four categories was considered not enough, and another category was added. Instead of adding a fifth category, the Tour organisation decided to add a hors catégorie.

== Tour de France ==
The following climbs used in the Tour de France have been ranked "Hors catégorie" at least once.

Col	Mountain range	Height (m.)	No. of times visited	No. of HC climbs	First time as HC climb	Most recent	Profile	Notes
Col Agnel	Cottian Alps	2744	2	2	2008	2011		The first appearance of the climb in 2008 was not planned initially, as the stage was designed to go through the Maddalena Pass. Due to a seismic risk on the pass, the route was changed three months before the start of the race and the Col Agnel was included.
Alpe d'Huez	Western Alps	1860	33	29	1979	2026		In 2013, the Alpe d'Huez was visited twice on Stage 18, firstly crossing below the summit at 1765m before returning as the stage finish at the designated summit (1850m). In 2026, Stages 19 and 20 will end at Alpe d'Huez, but only Stage 19 is using the classic climb. Stage 20 will approach Alpe d'Huez from Col de Sarenne, and thus is not included in this list.
Andorra Arcalis	Pyrenees	2240	3	3	1997	2016		
Annecy-Semnoz	Bauges	1655	2	1	2013	2013		In 1998, the Semnoz (known as Crêt de Châtillon) was part of the route and was a 1st category climb. However, during stage 17, racers went on strike to protest against the excessive police measures. The stage, although fully completed, was declared void.
Col d'Aubisque	Pyrenees	1709	49	17	1980	2022		No. of times visited includes stage finishes at Gourette
Port de Balès	Pyrenees	1755	6	6	2007	2020		
Plateau de Beille	Pyrenees	1780	7	7	1998	2024		
Col de la Biche	Jura	1316	1	1	2017	2017		
Montée de Bisanne	Beaufortain Massif	1723	2	2	2016	2018		
Col de la Bonette	French Alps	2802	5	3	1993	2024		Highest Hors Catégorie climb to date.
Chamrousse	Belledonne	1730	2	2	2001	2014		
Col de la Croix-de-Fer	Dauphiné Alps	2067	20	14	1989	2026		Shares the same slopes from the col du Glandon on two sides.
Finhaut-Emosson	Swiss Alps	1960	1	1	2016	2016		
Col du Galibier	Dauphiné Alps	2645	60	25	1979	2026		Highest stage finish in the history of the Tour de France. In 2015, the climb was scheduled to be used, but ultimately was not due to landslides. The Col de la Croix de Fer was used instead.
Col du Glandon	Dauphiné Alps	1924	15	6	1981	2025		
Col du Grand Colombier	Jura	1501	6	5	2012	2023		In the 2016 tour, the Col du Grand Colombier was climbed twice on Stage 15. First as an HC climb of 1483 meters and then as a category 1 ascent of 893 meters.
Col du Grand Saint-Bernard	Pennine Alps	2465	5	1	2009	2009		
Col du Granon	Massif des Cerces	2413	2	2	1986	2022		
Hautacam	Pyrenees	1560	7	7	1994	2025		
Col de l'Iseran	Graian Alps	2770	6	3	1992	2019		In the 2019 tour, GC times were taken from the top of the Col de l'Iseran when Stage 19 was neutralized due to landslides on the descent
Isola 2000	French Alps	2024	2	1	1993	1993		
Col d'Izoard	French Alps	2360	35	9	1986	2019		
Col de Joux-Plane	French Alps	1691	13	8	1981	2023		
La Plagne	French Alps	1980	5	5	1984	2025		
Port de Larrau	Pyrenees	1573	2	2	1996	2007		
La Ruchère	French Alps	1160	1	1	1984	1984		Lowest Hors Catégorie climb to date.
Col de la Lombarde	French Alps	2351	1	1	2008	2008		
Col de la Loze	French Alps	2304	3	3	2020	2025		Steepest maximum gradient (24%) of any Hors Catégorie climb to date
Luz Ardiden	Pyrenees	1715	9	9	1985	2021		
Col de la Madeleine	French Alps	1993	28	20	1980	2025		
Col du Mont-Cenis	Graian Alps / Cottian Alps	2083	5	1	1999	1999		
Mont du Chat	Jura	1504	1	1	2017	2017		
Port de Pailhères	Pyrenees	2001	5	4	2005	2013		
Col de la Pierre St Martin	Pyrenees	1610	2	1	2015	2015		
Pla d'Adet	Pyrenees	1669	11	6	1981	2024		The 1982 Tour de France finish was planned to end at another location, the Col de Portet, but was ultimately cancelled and the finish line was moved back to Pla d'Adet.
Plateau des Glières	Bornes Massif	1390	2	2	2018	2020		
Col de Portet	Pyrenees	2215	2	2	2021	2021		
Col du Pré	French Alps	1748	3	3	2018	2025		
Puy de Dôme	Massif Central	1415	13	3	1983	2023		Only climb in the Massif Central to have received the Hors Catégorie rating
Col de Sarenne	French Alps	1508	2	1	2026	2026		In 2013, the tour crossed Col de Sarenne, but approached it from Alpe d'Huez, with the Sarenne classified as Category 2. The 2026 tour will feature the first full ascent of the Sarenne.
Plateau de Solaison	Bornes Massif	1508	1	1	2026	2026		
Col du Soudet	Pyrenees	1540	6	3	1987	2023		
Col du Soulor	Pyrenees	1474	22	1	1982	1982		Usually climbed while descending the col d'Aubisque from its west side.
Superbagnères	Pyrenees	1770	7	2	1986	2025		
Col du Tourmalet	Pyrenees	2115	93	33	1980	2026		No. of times visited includes stage finishes at La Mongie.
Val Thorens	French Alps	2365	2	2	1994	2019		
Col de Vars	French Alps	2109	24	1	2024	2024		
Mont Ventoux	periphery of the Alps	1909	19	9	1987	2025		In 2021, the Ventoux was climbed twice, the first ascent started from Sault and was a 1st category climb while the second ascent started from Bédoin and was categorized HC.

== See also ==
- List of highest paved roads in Europe
- List of mountain passes
