= 2008 Tour de France =

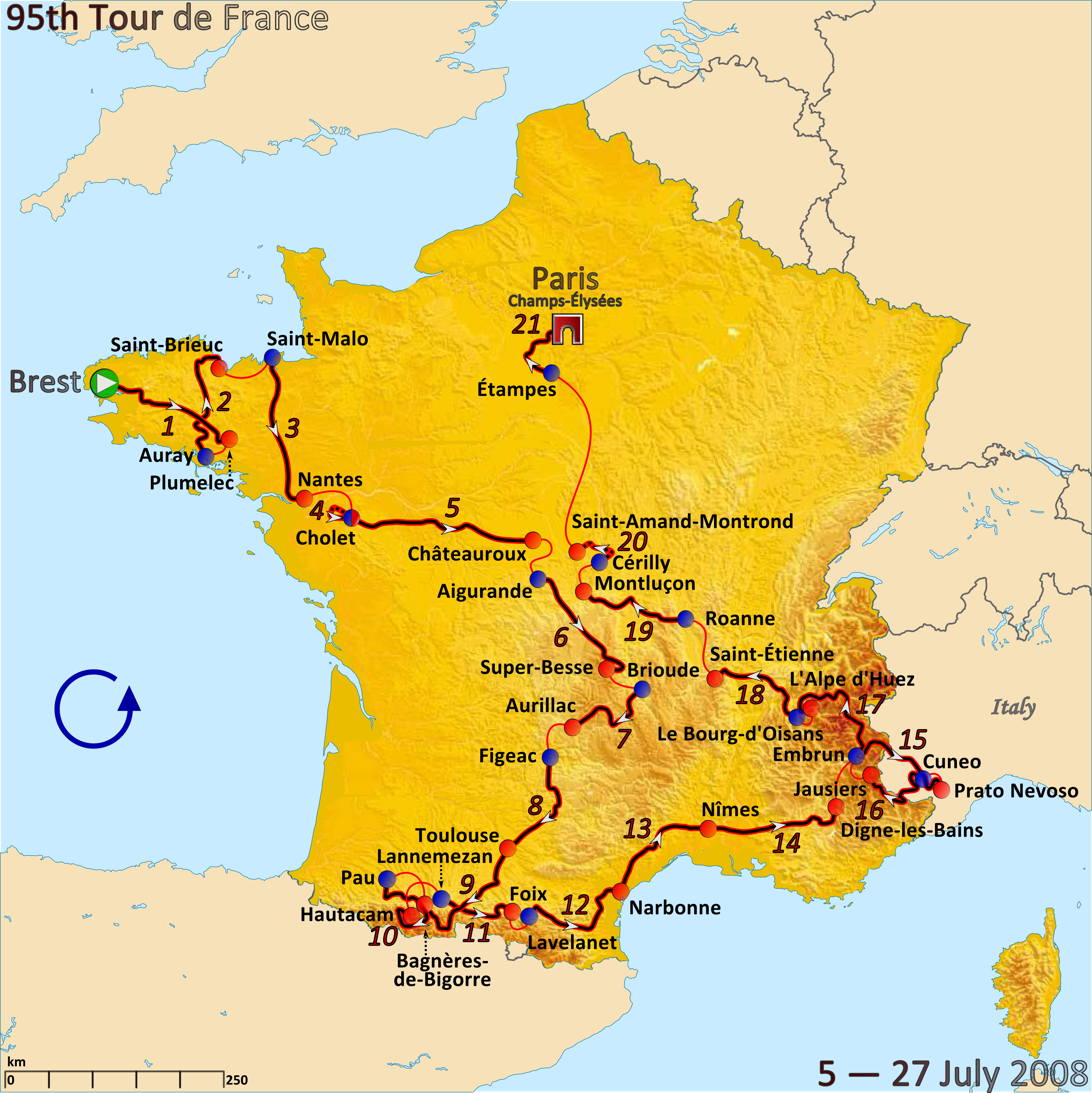
- Route of the 2008 Tour de France

Race details
- Dates: 5–27 July 2008
- Stages: 21
- Distance: 3,559 km (2,211 mi)
- Winning time: 87h 52' 52"

Results
| Jersey awarded to the overall winner | Winner | Carlos Sastre (ESP) | (CSC–Saxo Bank) |
| | Second | Cadel Evans (AUS) | (Silence–Lotto) |
| | Third | ~~Bernhard Kohl~~ Denis Menchov (RUS) | (Rabobank) |
| Jersey awarded to the points classification winner | Points | Óscar Freire (ESP) | (Rabobank) |
| Jersey awarded to the mountains classification winner | Mountains | ~~Bernhard Kohl~~ Carlos Sastre (ESP) | (CSC–Saxo Bank) |
| Jersey awarded to the young rider classification winner | Young rider | Andy Schleck (LUX) | (CSC–Saxo Bank) |
| Jersey awarded to the combativity classification winner | Combativity | Sylvain Chavanel (FRA) | (Cofidis) |
| Jersey awarded to the team classification winner | Team | CSC–Saxo Bank | |

The 2008 Tour de France was the 95th running of the race. The event took place from 5 to 27 July. Starting in the French city of Brest, the tour entered Italy on the 15th stage and returned to France during the 16th, heading for Paris, its regular final destination, which was reached in the 21st stage. The race was won by Carlos Sastre.

Unlike previous years, time bonuses were no longer awarded for intermediate sprints and for high placement on each stage. This altered the way the General Classification was awarded in comparison to previous seasons.

== Teams ==
Long running disputes between the event organisers, the ASO and the UCI reached a head when the race organisers insisted upon the right to invite, or exclude, whichever teams it chose for the event. Under UCI rules, any ProTour event must be open to all member teams of the UCI's top level. The ASO made it clear that, despite changes in team management and personnel, it intended to exclude Astana from the event as a result of its involvement in the doping scandals that marred the 2007 Tour and its links to the 2006 Operación Puerto doping case. This meant that the champion (Alberto Contador) and third-place finisher (Levi Leipheimer) from 2007, both of whom had since signed with Astana, could not compete in the 2008 Tour.

The ASO announced on 20 March 2008 that all ProTour teams except Astana would be invited, along with three wildcard teams: Agritubel, Barloworld, and Slipstream–Chipotle (subsequently renamed as Garmin–Chipotle p/b H30). With each team consisting of nine riders, 180 riders started the Tour.

The teams entering the race were:

UCI ProTour teams

- Ag2r–La Mondiale
- Bouygues Télécom
- Caisse d'Epargne
- Cofidis
- Crédit Agricole
- Euskaltel–Euskadi
- Française des Jeux
- Gerolsteiner
- Lampre
- Liquigas
- Quick-Step
- Rabobank
- Saunier Duval–Scott
- Silence–Lotto
- CSC–Saxo Bank
- Team Milram
- Team Columbia

Invited teams

- Agritubel
- Barloworld
- Garmin–Chipotle p/b H30

== Pre-race favourites ==
Because Astana was not invited to the 2008 Tour de France, the winner of the 2007 Tour de France, Alberto Contador, the 3rd-place finisher Levi Leipheimer and the 2004 and 2006 Tour de France runner up Andreas Klöden did not compete. Ten days before the start of the tour, Contador picked Cadel Evans as the likely winner for 2008. Shown in the table below are the riders that, according to the bookmakers in the months before the start of the 2008 Tour de France, had a chance of winning the 2008 Tour better than or equal to 25/1. The odds shown are the odds in July 2008, directly before the start of the race. Thomas Dekker and Michael Rogers were also given odds in this range, but were not included in the Tour de France.

== Route and stages ==
The 2008 Tour de France was almost entirely in France, with only a small part in Italy. In previous years, the Tour started with a prologue, followed by a week of flat stages. The flat stages were dominated by the sprinters' teams, and the yellow jersey was worn by a sprinter who had a good prologue. At the presentation of the Tour de France 2008 schedule, Tour Director Christian Prudhomme announced that the 2008 Tour would be different: "We have wanted a first week of racing with much more rhythm. With no prologue, an uphill finish that will suit different types of sprinters at the end of stage one, with a short time trial on stage four and the first mountain at Super-Besse only 48 hours later, we have decided to change the scenario." The time bonuses at the end of each stage were removed, and there was 82 kilometres (51 mi) of time trials, less than usual. The highest point of elevation in the race was 2,802 m (9,193 ft) at the Cime de la Bonette loop road on stage 16.

Stage characteristics and winners
| Stage | Date | Course | Distance | Type | Winner |
|---|---|---|---|---|---|
| 1 | 5 July | Brest to Plumelec | 197.5 km (122.7 mi) | Flat stage | Alejandro Valverde (ESP) |
| 2 | 6 July | Auray to Saint-Brieuc | 164.5 km (102.2 mi) | Flat stage | Thor Hushovd (NOR) |
| 3 | 7 July | Saint-Malo to Nantes | 208.0 km (129.2 mi) | Flat stage | Samuel Dumoulin (FRA) |
| 4 | 8 July | Cholet to Cholet | 29.5 km (18.3 mi) | Individual time trial | Kim Kirchen (LUX) |
| 5 | 9 July | Cholet to Châteauroux | 232.0 km (144.2 mi) | Flat stage | Mark Cavendish (GBR) |
| 6 | 10 July | Aigurande to Super-Besse Sancy | 195.5 km (121.5 mi) | Transition stage | Alejandro Valverde (ESP) |
| 7 | 11 July | Brioude to Aurillac | 159.0 km (98.8 mi) | Transition stage | Luis León Sánchez (ESP) |
| 8 | 12 July | Figeac to Toulouse | 172.5 km (107.2 mi) | Flat stage | Mark Cavendish (GBR) |
| 9 | 13 July | Toulouse to Bagnères-de-Bigorre | 224.0 km (139.2 mi) | Mountain stage | Vladimir Efimkin (RUS) |
| 10 | 14 July | Pau to Hautacam | 156.0 km (96.9 mi) | Mountain stage | Juan José Cobo (ESP) |
| | 15 July | Pau | | Rest day | |
| 11 | 16 July | Lannemezan to Foix | 167.5 km (104.1 mi) | Transition stage | Kurt Asle Arvesen (NOR) |
| 12 | 17 July | Lavelanet to Narbonne | 168.5 km (104.7 mi) | Flat stage | Mark Cavendish (GBR) |
| 13 | 18 July | Narbonne to Nîmes | 182.0 km (113.1 mi) | Flat stage | Mark Cavendish (GBR) |
| 14 | 19 July | Nîmes to Digne-les-Bains | 194.5 km (120.9 mi) | Flat stage | Óscar Freire (ESP) |
| 15 | 20 July | Embrun (Note: The 15th stage was due to start at Digne-les-Bains but due to the risk of rock falls in the climb up the Col de Larche, the organisers decided to modify the itinerary. The stage took off from Embrun and head to Prato Nevoso facing the climb up the Col Agnel (2744 m).) to Prato Nevoso (Italy) | 183.0 km (113.7 mi) | Mountain stage | Simon Gerrans (AUS) |
| | 21 July | Cuneo (Italy) | | Rest day | |
| 16 | 22 July | Cuneo (Italy) to Jausiers | 157.0 km (97.6 mi) | Mountain stage | Cyril Dessel (FRA) |
| 17 | 23 July | Embrun to Alpe d'Huez | 210.5 km (130.8 mi) | Mountain stage | Carlos Sastre (ESP) |
| 18 | 24 July | Bourg-d'Oisans to Saint-Étienne | 196.5 km (122.1 mi) | Transition stage | Marcus Burghardt (GER) |
| 19 | 25 July | Roanne to Montluçon | 165.5 km (102.8 mi) | Flat stage | Sylvain Chavanel (FRA) |
| 20 | 26 July | Cérilly to Saint-Amand-Montrond | 53.0 km (32.9 mi) | Individual time trial | Fabian Cancellara (SUI) |
| 21 | 27 July | Étampes to Paris (Champs-Élysées) | 143.0 km (88.9 mi) | Flat stage | Gert Steegmans (BEL) |
| | Total | | 3,559 km (2,211 mi) | | |

== Race overview ==
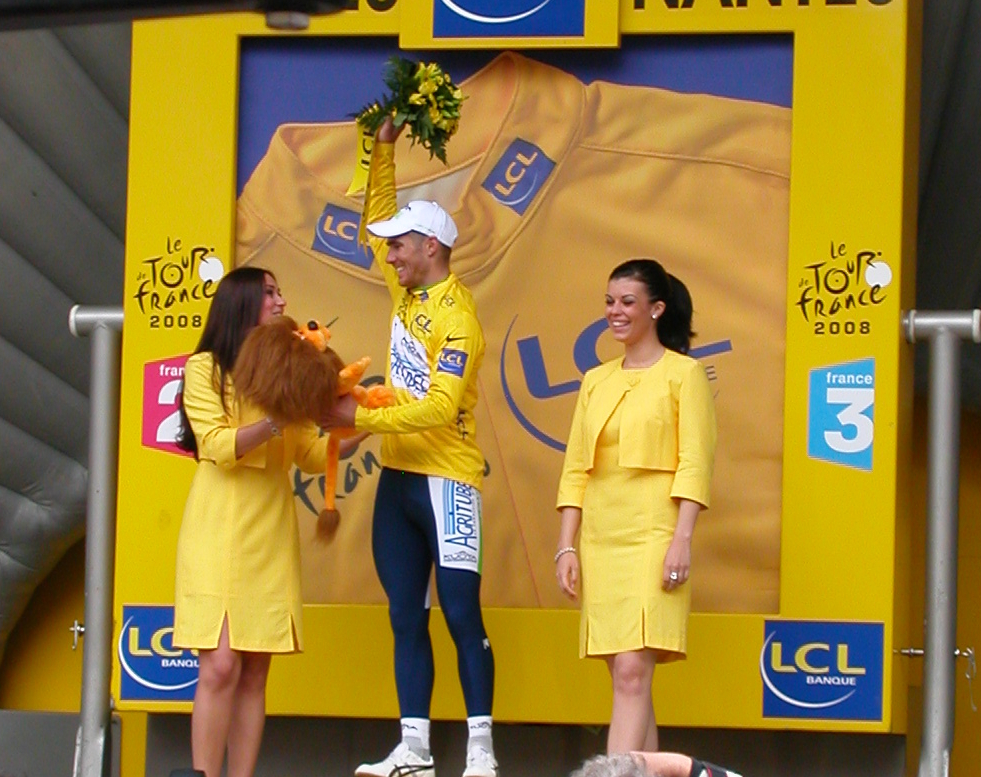
Romain Feillu was the only French cyclist to wear the yellow jersey in the 2008 Tour de France; he wore it for one day after stage 3.

In the first week of the 2008 Tour de France, the stages were mostly flat. As traditionally in the Tour de France, this resulted in small breakaways of cyclists, and the sprinters' teams trying to get them back. In the first stage, the sprinters won, with Thor Hushovd winning the stage, but in the second stage, four cyclists managed to stay away. The fourth stage was a time trial, won by Stefan Schumacher, who took over the lead. In the fifth stage, the sprinters won the battle and Mark Cavendish won the stage.

The Massif Central mountains were visited in stage six and seven. In stage six, all the breakaways were caught, and the favourites stayed together and finished together. In stage seven, the same scenario, only now Luis León Sánchez managed to stay a few seconds ahead and win the stage. The eighth stage was a sprinter stage, won by Cavendish. Then, from stage nine, the Pyrenees were climbed. Riccardo Riccò broke away from the bunch on the final climb, and won the stage. On stage 10, a group of four with some main contenders escaped, and Leonardo Piepoli won the stage. Stage eleven had easier climbs, and a group of four riders, not important for the overall classification, were allowed to break away and win by 14 minutes.

Stages twelve to fourteen were flat stages, and were dominated by the sprinters. Mark Cavendish won another two stages, and Óscar Freire took his first. In the fifteenth stage, a group of four cyclists escaped and stayed away, a similar thing happened in stage sixteen. In the seventeenth stage, Carlos Sastre placed a surprise attack (not only a surprise for his opponents, but also for his teammates and directeur sportif) won the stage and took the lead in the general classification. The eighteenth and nineteenth stage again saw breakaways of cyclists not important for the general classification. The twentieth stage, a time trial, was won by Stefan Schumacher who had also won the first time trial. The last stage was a sprinters' stage, won by Gert Steegmans.

=== Doping ===
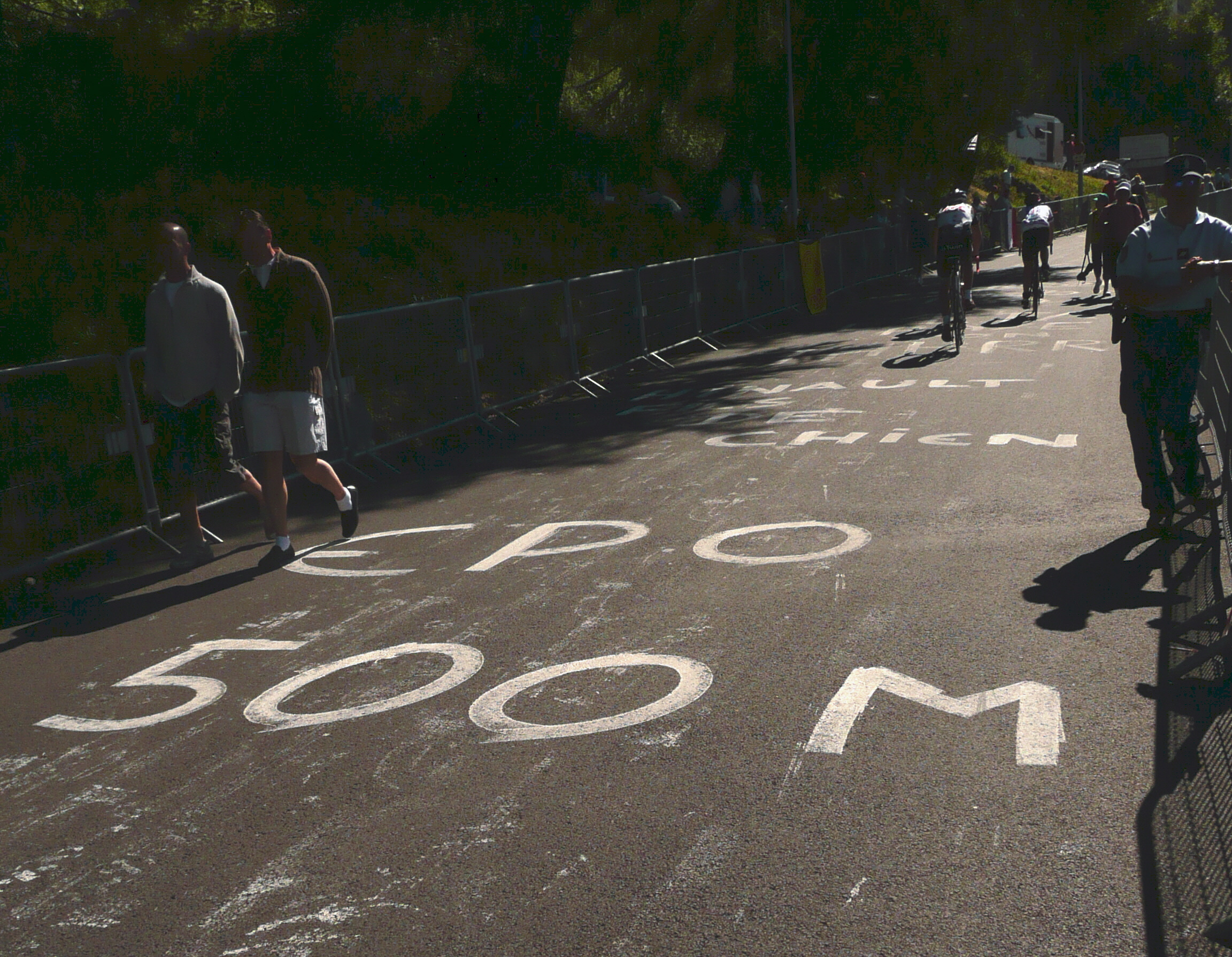
Writing on the street during Tour de France 2008 at Alpe d'Huez, satirically saying that EPO is available in 500 meters.

On 26 May 2008, the 2007 green jersey (points) winner Tom Boonen tested positive for cocaine. Since this was outside competition, Boonen was not sanctioned by the UCI or WADA, but he was nevertheless barred from the 2008 Tour de France.

Following protracted disagreement between the organisers of the Tour de France (ASO) and the UCI, the race was sanctioned by the Fédération Française de Cyclisme (FFC), as was the 2008 Paris–Nice in March. Thus the FFC were in charge of the doping controls before and during the race, and rather than increasing the number of doping controls during the Tour, they applied a more targeted approach on suspect riders. The French government's anti-doping agency AFLD carried out approximately 60 random and targeted tests in the weeks leading up to the Tour. They took blood samples from all the 180 riders in a two-day period just before the first stage, and during the race took samples from up to 14 riders a day shortly after the stage was finished, 250 tests being run in total. The Italian National Olympic Committee (CONI) also performed unannounced doping tests of riders at the finish of stage 15, which ended at the ski resort of Prato Nevoso, Italy. On 3 July 2008, France enacted a law criminalizing using or trafficking in doping substances.

On 11 July news broke that Spanish rider Manuel Beltrán tested positive for erythropoietin after the first stage of the tour. Blood abnormalities before the tour start had led AFLD to target the rider. Beltrán's team Liquigas withdrew him from the tour with immediate effect. French law enforcement authorities questioned Beltrán over possible offences and searched his hotel room, but he claimed his innocence. The B-Sample has not yet been tested.

On 13 July, prior to the ninth stage, it was revealed that AFLD had informed team doctors that five riders had unusually high hematocrit levels. The Italian press reported that Riccardo Riccò, who won the stage later that day, had been selected for testing several times during the first week, which led to a suspicion that he was among those whose teams had been notified. Riccò has for some time been known to have a naturally high hematocrit level of 51%, above the 50%-level which usually is taken to be an indicator of possible blood manipulation. Riccò stated that he has a licence confirming that this is a natural, long-term condition, which he gave to the doping agencies before the start of the race, but he later admitted to the offence at a hearing of the Italian National Olympic Committee (CONI).

On 16 July Barloworld started the 11th stage without Moisés Dueñas, who had been withdrawn from the team after being tested positive for EPO at the end of the time trial fourth stage. Barloworld Ltd, two days later, announced that they were withdrawing from sponsorship after this year's Tour de France, but on 28 October, they announced that they would sponsor the team for another year.

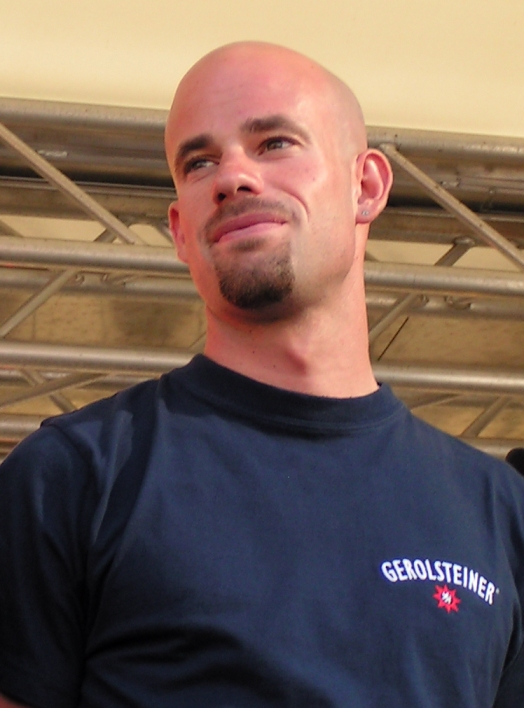
Stefan Schumacher tested positive for MIRCERA following additional testing of his blood samples.

On 17 July, shortly before the start of stage 12, Ricardo Riccò and the rest of the Saunier Duval–Scott team, withdrew from the race after the announcement that he had tested positive for MIRCERA, a new type of EPO, at the end of stage 4. Leonardo Piepoli, winner of stage 10, was sacked by his team for "violation of the team's ethics code" the following day, though no positive test was reported at that time. Almost 3 months later his tests came back positive for samples taken one day prior to the start of the Tour, on 4 July, and also on 15 July, on the rest day in Pau.

On the last day of the race, but after the end of the stage, Dmitry Fofonov was announced to have tested positive for the banned stimulant heptaminol after Stage 18. He was asked for a medical exemption to use the stimulant, but did not produce one. He was subsequently fired by his team Crédit Agricole.

After the race ended, French cyclist Jimmy Casper was suspended from Agritubel because he tested positive after the stage to Super Besse for glucocorticoids, an asthma drug that is banned unless the user has a medical exemption for its use. Casper, an asthmatic, carried a therapeutic use exemptions (TUE) for the last twelve years but failed to renew this exemption. His authorisation expired on 29 May and was not renewed before the 2008 Tour de France. The French cycling federation's disciplinary commission exonerated Casper.

In late September it was announced that several Tour de France riders were to have their blood samples retested for traces of EPO. Pierre Bordry, the head of AFLD, claimed the testing involved riders who were already under scrutiny for suspicious urine samples. AFLD had suspicion that there was MIRCERA in some samples but the laboratory could not say definitively. The urine tests were somewhat unreliable at giving definitive results, so the AFLD decided to order the blood samples taken before and during the Tour for additional testing with a newly developed CERA blood test.

As a result of this additional testing, both Leonardo Piepoli and Stefan Schumacher tested positive for the same substance which Riccò used, MIRCERA. The riders were declared positive by AFLD.

On 13 October 2008, the AFLD announced that Bernhard Kohl, who finished in third place overall and winner of the climbers' competition, had also tested positive for MIRCERA on 3 and 15 July, before and during the Tour de France. Initial results were verified, and Kohl also confessed to doping. His third-place overall finish in the 2008 Tour and his first place in the King of the Mountains competition are considered vacancies in the Tour's official history. (Note: The results of Austrian cyclist Bernhard Kohl have been removed, after Kohl tested positive and admitted the use of doping. As of 27 July 2009, other cyclists have not been upgraded to the positions Kohl's removal has vacated.)

== Classification leadership and minor prizes ==
There were four main individual classifications contested in the 2008 Tour de France, as well as a team competition. The most important was the general classification, which was calculated by adding each rider's finishing times on each stage. There were no time bonuses given at the end of stages for this edition of the Tour. If a crash had happened within the final 3 km (1.9 mi) of a stage, not including time trials and summit finishes, the riders involved would have received the same time as the group they were in when the crash occurred. The rider with the lowest cumulative time was the winner of the general classification and was considered the overall winner of the Tour. The rider leading the classification wore a yellow jersey.

The second classification was the points classification. Riders received points for finishing in the highest positions in a stage finish, or in intermediate sprints during the stage. The points available for each stage finish were determined by the stage's type. The leader was identified by a green jersey.

The third classification was the mountains classification. Most stages of the race included one or more categorised climbs, in which points were awarded to the riders that reached the summit first. The climbs were categorised as fourth-, third-, second- or first-category and hors catégorie, with the more difficult climbs rated lower. The leader wore a white jersey with red polka dots.

The final individual classification was the young rider classification. This was calculated the same way as the general classification, but the classification was restricted to riders who were born on or after 1 January 1983. The leader wore a white jersey.

The final classification was a team classification. This was calculated using the finishing times of the best three riders per team on each stage; the leading team was the team with the lowest cumulative time. The number of stage victories and placings per team determined the outcome of a tie. The riders in the team that lead this classification were identified with yellow number bibs on the back of their jerseys.

In addition, there was a combativity award given after each mass start stage to the rider considered, by a jury, to have "made the greatest effort and who has demonstrated the best qualities of sportsmanship". The winner wore a red number bib the following stage. At the conclusion of the Tour, Sylvain Chavanel (Cofidis) was given the overall super-combativity award.

There were also two special awards each with a prize of €5000, the Souvenir Henri Desgrange, given in honour of Tour founder and first race director Henri Desgrange to the first rider to pass the summit of the Col du Galibier on stage 17, and the Souvenir Jacques Goddet, given in honour of the second director Jacques Goddet to the first rider to pass the summit of the Col du Tourmalet on stage 10. Stefan Schumacher won the Henri Desgrange and Rémy Di Gregorio won the Jacques Goddet.

Classification leadership by stage
| Stage | Winner | General classification | Points classification | Mountains classification | Young rider classification | Team classification | Combativity award |
|---|---|---|---|---|---|---|---|
| 1 | Alejandro Valverde | Alejandro Valverde | Alejandro Valverde | Thomas Voeckler | Riccardo Riccò | Caisse d'Epargne | Lilian Jégou |
| 2 | Thor Hushovd | Alejandro Valverde | Kim Kirchen | Thomas Voeckler | Riccardo Riccò | Caisse d'Epargne | Sylvain Chavanel |
| 3 | Samuel Dumoulin | Romain Feillu | Kim Kirchen | Thomas Voeckler | Romain Feillu | Garmin–Chipotle p/b H30 | William Frischkorn |
| 4 | Kim Kirchen | ~~Stefan Schumacher~~ | Kim Kirchen | Thomas Voeckler | Thomas Lövkvist | Garmin–Chipotle p/b H30 | no award |
| 5 | Mark Cavendish | ~~Stefan Schumacher~~ | Thor Hushovd | Thomas Voeckler | Thomas Lövkvist | Garmin–Chipotle p/b H30 | Nicolas Vogondy |
| 6 | Alejandro Valverde | Kim Kirchen | Kim Kirchen | Sylvain Chavanel | Thomas Lövkvist | Garmin–Chipotle p/b H30 | Sylvain Chavanel |
| 7 | Luis León Sánchez | Kim Kirchen | Kim Kirchen | David de la Fuente | Thomas Lövkvist | CSC–Saxo Bank | Luis León Sánchez |
| 8 | Mark Cavendish | Kim Kirchen | Óscar Freire | David de la Fuente | Thomas Lövkvist | CSC–Saxo Bank | Laurent Lefèvre |
| 9 | Vladimir Efimkin | Kim Kirchen | Kim Kirchen | David de la Fuente | Andy Schleck | CSC–Saxo Bank | Sebastian Lang |
| 10 | Juan José Cobo | Cadel Evans | Óscar Freire | Riccardo Riccò | Riccardo Riccò | Saunier Duval–Scott | Rémy Di Gregorio |
| 11 | Kurt Asle Arvesen | Cadel Evans | Óscar Freire | Riccardo Riccò | Riccardo Riccò | CSC–Saxo Bank | Amaël Moinard |
| 12 | Mark Cavendish | Cadel Evans | Óscar Freire | Sebastian Lang | Vincenzo Nibali | CSC–Saxo Bank | Arnaud Gérard |
| 13 | Mark Cavendish | Cadel Evans | Óscar Freire | Sebastian Lang | Vincenzo Nibali | CSC–Saxo Bank | Niki Terpstra |
| 14 | Óscar Freire | Cadel Evans | Óscar Freire | Sebastian Lang | Vincenzo Nibali | CSC–Saxo Bank | José Iván Gutiérrez |
| 15 | Simon Gerrans | Fränk Schleck | Óscar Freire | ~~Bernhard Kohl~~ | Vincenzo Nibali | CSC–Saxo Bank | Egoi Martínez |
| 16 | Cyril Dessel | Fränk Schleck | Óscar Freire | ~~Bernhard Kohl~~ | Andy Schleck | CSC–Saxo Bank | Stefan Schumacher |
| 17 | Carlos Sastre | Carlos Sastre | Óscar Freire | ~~Bernhard Kohl~~ | Andy Schleck | CSC–Saxo Bank | Peter Velits |
| 18 | Marcus Burghardt | Carlos Sastre | Óscar Freire | ~~Bernhard Kohl~~ | Andy Schleck | CSC–Saxo Bank | Marcus Burghardt |
| 19 | Sylvain Chavanel | Carlos Sastre | Óscar Freire | ~~Bernhard Kohl~~ | Andy Schleck | CSC–Saxo Bank | Sylvain Chavanel |
| 20 | Fabian Cancellara | Carlos Sastre | Óscar Freire | ~~Bernhard Kohl~~ | Andy Schleck | CSC–Saxo Bank | no award |
| 21 | Gert Steegmans | Carlos Sastre | Óscar Freire | ~~Bernhard Kohl~~ | Andy Schleck | CSC–Saxo Bank | Nicolas Vogondy |
| Final | | Carlos Sastre | Óscar Freire | Carlos Sastre | Andy Schleck | CSC–Saxo Bank | Sylvain Chavanel |

- In stage 2, Philippe Gilbert wore the green jersey
- In stage 4, Andy Schleck wore the white jersey
- In stage 7, Thor Hushovd wore the green jersey
- In stages 8 and 10, Óscar Freire wore the green jersey
- In stages 11 and 12, Vincenzo Nibali wore the white jersey.
- In stage 12, no-one wore the polka-dot jersey, due to Riccardo Riccò's withdrawal.

== Final standings ==
Legend
| Yellow jersey | Denotes the leader of the general classification | Polka dot jersey | Denotes the leader of the mountains classification |
| Green jersey | Denotes the leader of the points classification | White jersey | Denotes the leader of the young rider classification |
| Jersey with a yellow background on the number bib. | Denotes the leader of the team classification | Jersey with a red background on the number bib. | Denotes the winner of the combativity award |

=== General classification ===
Final general classification (1–10)
| Rank | Rider | Team | Time |
|---|---|---|---|
| 1 | Carlos Sastre (ESP) | CSC–Saxo Bank | 87h 52' 52" |
| 2 | Cadel Evans (AUS) | Silence–Lotto | + 58" |
| DSQ | ~~Bernhard Kohl (AUT)~~ | ~~Gerolsteiner~~ | ~~+ 1' 13"~~ |
| 3 | Denis Menchov (RUS) | Rabobank | + 2' 10" |
| 4 | Christian Vande Velde (USA) | Garmin–Chipotle p/b H30 | + 3' 05" |
| 5 | Fränk Schleck (LUX) | CSC–Saxo Bank | + 4' 28" |
| 6 | Samuel Sánchez (ESP) | Euskaltel–Euskadi | + 6' 25" |
| 7 | Kim Kirchen (LUX) | Team Columbia | + 6' 55" |
| 8 | Alejandro Valverde (ESP) | Caisse d'Epargne | + 7' 12" |
| 9 | Tadej Valjavec (SLO) | Ag2r–La Mondiale | + 9' 05" |
| 10 | Vladimir Efimkin (RUS) | Ag2r–La Mondiale | + 9' 55" |

Final general classification (11–144)
| Rank | Rider | Team | Time |
|---|---|---|---|
| 12 | Andy Schleck (LUX) | CSC–Saxo Bank | + 11' 32" |
| 13 | Roman Kreuziger (CZE) | Liquigas | + 12' 59" |
| 14 | Sandy Casar (FRA) | Française des Jeux | + 19' 23" |
| 15 | Amaël Moinard (FRA) | Cofidis | + 23' 31" |
| 16 | Mikel Astarloza (ESP) | Euskaltel–Euskadi | + 23' 40" |
| 17 | Kanstantsin Sivtsov (BLR) | Team Columbia | + 24' 55" |
| 18 | Alexander Bocharov (RUS) | Crédit Agricole | + 27' 11" |
| 19 | Vincenzo Nibali (ITA) | Liquigas | + 28' 33" |
| 20 | Stéphane Goubert (FRA) | Ag2r–La Mondiale | + 31' 50" |
| 21 | Laurens ten Dam (NED) | Rabobank | + 32' 59" |
| 22 | Maxime Monfort (BEL) | Cofidis | + 35' 41" |
| 23 | Yaroslav Popovych (UKR) | Silence–Lotto | + 36' 24" |
| 24 | Stefan Schumacher (GER) | Gerolsteiner | + 37' 20" |
| 25 | Sylwester Szmyd (POL) | Lampre | + 44' 43" |
| 26 | Marzio Bruseghin (ITA) | Lampre | + 45' 19" |
| 27 | Cyril Dessel (FRA) | Ag2r–La Mondiale | + 46' 31" |
| 28 | Christian Knees (GER) | Team Milram | + 47' 43" |
| 29 | David Arroyo (ESP) | Caisse d'Epargne | + 48' 23" |
| 30 | Mario Aerts (BEL) | Silence–Lotto | + 48' 58" |
| 31 | Pierrick Fédrigo (FRA) | Bouygues Télécom | + 50' 19" |
| 32 | Markus Fothen (GER) | Gerolsteiner | + 1h 01' 04" |
| 33 | Koos Moerenhout (NED) | Rabobank | + 1h 05' 38" |
| 34 | George Hincapie (USA) | Team Columbia | + 1h 08' 15" |
| 35 | Matteo Carrara (ITA) | Quick-Step | + 1h 09' 25" |
| 36 | Jens Voigt (GER) | CSC–Saxo Bank | + 1h 11' 55" |
| 37 | Jérôme Pineau (FRA) | Bouygues Télécom | + 1h 12' 58" |
| 38 | Eduardo Gonzalo (ESP) | Agritubel | + 1h 20' 06" |
| 39 | Christophe Le Mével (FRA) | Crédit Agricole | + 1h 20' 24" |
| 40 | Thomas Lövkvist (SWE) | Team Columbia | + 1h 25' 27" |
| 41 | David Moncoutié (FRA) | Cofidis | + 1h 26' 22" |
| 42 | Erik Zabel (GER) | Team Milram | + 1h 26' 40" |
| 43 | Marco Velo (ITA) | Team Milram | + 1h 26' 42" |
| 44 | Haimar Zubeldia (ESP) | Euskaltel–Euskadi | + 1h 27' 00" |
| 45 | Volodymir Gustov (UKR) | CSC–Saxo Bank | + 1h 29' 59" |
| 46 | Ryder Hesjedal (CAN) | Garmin–Chipotle p/b H30 | + 1h 33' 22" |
| 47 | John-Lee Augustyn (SAF) | Barloworld | + 1h 36' 21" |
| 48 | Paolo Tiralongo (ITA) | Lampre | + 1h 36' 57" |
| 49 | Egoi Martínez (ESP) | Euskaltel–Euskadi | + 1h 37' 00" |
| 50 | David Lopez (ESP) | Caisse d'Epargne | + 1h 39' 37" |
| 51 | Amets Txurruka (ESP) | Euskaltel–Euskadi | + 1h 41' 59" |
| 52 | Leonardo Duque (COL) | Cofidis | + 1h 44' 24" |
| 53 | Johann Tschopp (SUI) | Bouygues Télécom | + 1h 47' 22" |
| 54 | Hubert Dupont (FRA) | Ag2r–La Mondiale | + 1h 47' 24" |
| 55 | José Iván Gutiérrez (ESP) | Caisse d'Epargne | + 1h 48' 27" |
| 56 | Kurt Asle Arvesen (NOR) | CSC–Saxo Bank | + 1h 49' 40" |
| 57 | Peter Velits (SVK) | Team Milram | + 1h 49' 49" |
| 58 | Rémy Di Gregorio (FRA) | Française des Jeux | + 1h 49' 54" |
| 59 | Bram Tankink (NED) | Rabobank | + 1h 50' 24" |
| 60 | Sylvain Chavanel (FRA) | Cofidis | + 1h 54' 25" |
| 61 | Luis Leon Sánchez (ESP) | Caisse d'Epargne | + 1h 55' 39" |
| 62 | Pieter Weening (NED) | Rabobank | + 1h 55' 52" |
| 63 | Nicolas Vogondy (FRA) | Agritubel | + 1h 56' 04" |
| 64 | Fabian Cancellara (SUI) | CSC–Saxo Bank | + 1h 57' 09" |
| 65 | Nicolas Portal (FRA) | Caisse d'Epargne | + 1h 58' 16" |
| 66 | Filippo Pozzato (ITA) | Liquigas | + 1h 59' 13" |
| 67 | David Millar (GBR) | Garmin–Chipotle p/b H30 | + 1h 59' 39" |
| 68 | Joost Posthuma (NED) | Rabobank | + 2h 05' 10" |
| 69 | Óscar Freire (ESP) | Rabobank | + 2h 05' 46" |
| 70 | Martin Elmiger (SUI) | Ag2r–La Mondiale | + 2h 06' 21" |
| 71 | José Luis Arrieta (ESP) | Ag2r–La Mondiale | + 2h 07' 33" |
| 72 | Gorka Verdugo (ESP) | Euskaltel–Euskadi | + 2h 08' 23" |
| 73 | Yoann Le Boulanger (FRA) | Française des Jeux | + 2h 08' 50" |
| 74 | Sebastian Lang (GER) | Gerolsteiner | + 2h 09' 23" |
| 75 | Murilo Antonio Fischer (BRA) | Liquigas | + 2h 13' 03" |
| 76 | Trent Lowe (AUS) | Garmin–Chipotle p/b H30 | + 2h 13' 41" |
| 77 | Jurgen Van De Walle (BEL) | Quick-Step | + 2h 13' 50" |
| 78 | Simon Gerrans (AUS) | Crédit Agricole | + 2h 14' 25" |
| 79 | Rémi Pauriol (FRA) | Crédit Agricole | + 2h 16' 33" |
| 80 | David Lelay (FRA) | Agritubel | + 2h 16' 43" |
| 81 | Benoît Vaugrenard (FRA) | Française des Jeux | + 2h 19' 33" |
| 82 | Dario David Cioni (ITA) | Silence–Lotto | + 2h 20' 49" |
| 83 | Chris Froome (GBR) | Barloworld | + 2h 22' 33" |
| 84 | Geoffroy Lequatre (FRA) | Agritubel | + 2h 23' 04" |
| 85 | Laurent Lefèvre (FRA) | Bouygues Télécom | + 2h 23' 16" |
| 86 | Johan Vansummeren (BEL) | Silence–Lotto | + 2h 27' 04" |
| 87 | Giampaolo Cheula (ITA) | Barloworld | + 2h 30' 12" |
| 88 | Carlos Barredo (ESP) | Quick-Step | + 2h 30' 36" |
| 89 | Stef Clement (NED) | Bouygues Télécom | + 2h 32' 19" |
| 90 | Rubén Pérez (ESP) | Euskaltel–Euskadi | + 2h 33' 55" |
| 91 | Marco Marzano (ITA) | Lampre | + 2h 34' 08" |
| 92 | Ronny Scholz (GER) | Gerolsteiner | + 2h 34' 12" |
| 93 | Alessandro Ballan (ITA) | Lampre | + 2h 35' 08" |
| 94 | Danny Pate (USA) | Garmin–Chipotle p/b H30 | + 2h 36' 29" |
| 95 | Matteo Tosatto (ITA) | Quick-Step | + 2h 38' 07" |
| 96 | Thomas Voeckler (FRA) | Bouygues Télécom | + 2h 38' 13" |
| 97 | Sébastien Rosseler (BEL) | Quick-Step | + 2h 39' 58" |
| 98 | Thor Hushovd (NOR) | Crédit Agricole | + 2h 45' 20" |
| 99 | Björn Schröder (GER) | Team Milram | + 2h 48' 33" |
| 100 | Xavier Florencio (ESP) | Bouygues Télécom | + 2h 53' 51" |
| 101 | William Bonnet (FRA) | Crédit Agricole | + 2h 55' 29" |
| 102 | Juan José Oroz (ESP) | Euskaltel–Euskadi | + 2h 56' 12" |
| 103 | Iñaki Isasi (ESP) | Euskaltel–Euskadi | + 2h 57' 44" |
| 104 | Martin Müller (GER) | Team Milram | + 2h 58' 31" |
| 105 | Gerald Ciolek (GER) | Team Columbia | + 2h 58' 34" |
| 106 | Robert Hunter (SAF) | Barloworld | + 3h 04' 02" |
| 107 | Adam Hansen (AUS) | Team Columbia | + 3h 04' 52" |
| 108 | Stuart O'Grady (AUS) | CSC–Saxo Bank | + 3h 07' 46" |
| 109 | Julian Dean (NZL) | Garmin–Chipotle p/b H30 | + 3h 07' 57" |
| 110 | Gert Steegmans (BEL) | Quick-Step | + 3h 08' 23" |
| 111 | Philippe Gilbert (BEL) | Française des Jeux | + 3h 09' 56" |
| 112 | Frederik Willems (BEL) | Liquigas | + 3h 13' 38" |
| 113 | Samuel Dumoulin (FRA) | Cofidis | + 3h 14' 37" |
| 114 | Arnaud Coyot (FRA) | Caisse d'Epargne | + 3h 15' 53" |
| 115 | Robert Förster (GER) | Gerolsteiner | + 3h 16' 11" |
| 116 | Matteo Bono (ITA) | Lampre | + 3h 16' 36" |
| 117 | Nicki Sørensen (DEN) | CSC–Saxo Bank | + 3h 17' 01" |
| 118 | Florent Brard (FRA) | Cofidis | + 3h 17' 45" |
| 119 | Marcus Burghardt (GER) | Team Columbia | + 3h 20' 28" |
| 120 | Jérémy Roy (FRA) | Française des Jeux | + 3h 21' 32" |
| 121 | Robbie McEwen (AUS) | Silence–Lotto | + 3h 22' 36" |
| 122 | Ralf Grabsch (GER) | Team Milram | + 3h 23' 17" |
| 123 | Leif Hoste (BEL) | Silence–Lotto | + 3h 23' 53" |
| 124 | Steven de Jongh (NED) | Quick-Step | + 3h 24' 08" |
| 125 | Heinrich Haussler (GER) | Gerolsteiner | + 3h 25' 34" |
| 126 | Daniele Righi (ITA) | Lampre | + 3h 26' 16" |
| 127 | Aleksandr Kuschynski (BLR) | Liquigas | + 3h 26' 47" |
| 128 | Brett Lancaster (AUS) | Team Milram | + 3h 27' 29" |
| 129 | Manuel Quinziato (ITA) | Liquigas | + 3h 28' 03" |
| 130 | Sebastian Langeveld (NED) | Rabobank | + 3h 28' 07" |
| 131 | Arnaud Gérard (FRA) | Française des Jeux | + 3h 30' 00" |
| 132 | William Frischkorn (USA) | Garmin–Chipotle p/b H30 | + 3h 30' 47" |
| 133 | Martijn Maaskant (NED) | Garmin–Chipotle p/b H30 | + 3h 31' 30" |
| 134 | Freddy Bichot (FRA) | Agritubel | + 3h 32' 25" |
| 135 | Niki Terpstra (NED) | Team Milram | + 3h 33' 40" |
| 136 | Christophe Riblon (FRA) | Ag2r–La Mondiale | + 3h 35' 24" |
| 137 | Jimmy Engoulvent (FRA) | Crédit Agricole | + 3h 35' 30" |
| 138 | Stéphane Augé (FRA) | Cofidis | + 3h 35' 52" |
| 139 | Massimiliano Mori (ITA) | Lampre | + 3h 37' 22" |
| 140 | José Vicente García (ESP) | Caisse d'Epargne | + 3h 39' 48" |
| 141 | Matthieu Sprick (FRA) | Bouygues Télécom | + 3h 48' 18" |
| 142 | Sven Krauss (GER) | Gerolsteiner | + 3h 51' 55" |
| 143 | Bernhard Eisel (AUT) | Team Columbia | + 3h 54' 52" |
| 144 | Wim Vansevenant (BEL) | Silence–Lotto | + 3h 55' 45" |

=== Points classification ===
Final points classification (1–10)
| Rank | Rider | Team | Points |
|---|---|---|---|
| 1 | Óscar Freire (ESP) | Rabobank | 270 |
| 2 | Thor Hushovd (NOR) | Crédit Agricole | 220 |
| 3 | Erik Zabel (GER) | Team Milram | 217 |
| 4 | Leonardo Duque (COL) | Cofidis | 181 |
| 5 | Kim Kirchen (LUX) | Team Columbia | 155 |
| 6 | Alejandro Valverde (ESP) | Caisse d'Epargne | 136 |
| 7 | Robert Hunter (RSA) | Barloworld | 131 |
| 8 | Robbie McEwen (AUS) | Silence–Lotto | 129 |
| 9 | Julian Dean (NZL) | Garmin–Chipotle p/b H30 | 119 |
| 10 | Gerald Ciolek (GER) | Team Columbia | 116 |

=== Mountains classification ===
Final mountains classification (1–10)
| Rank | Rider | Team | Points |
|---|---|---|---|
| DSQ | ~~Bernhard Kohl (AUT)~~ | ~~Gerolsteiner~~ | ~~128~~ |
| 1 | Carlos Sastre (ESP) | CSC–Saxo Bank | 80 |
| 3 | Fränk Schleck (LUX) | CSC–Saxo Bank | 80 |
| 4 | Thomas Voeckler (FRA) | Bouygues Télécom | 65 |
| 5 | Sebastian Lang (GER) | Gerolsteiner | 62 |
| 6 | Stefan Schumacher (GER) | Gerolsteiner | 61 |
| 7 | John-Lee Augustyn (RSA) | Barloworld | 61 |
| 8 | Alejandro Valverde (ESP) | Caisse d'Epargne | 58 |
| 9 | Rémy Di Gregorio (FRA) | Française des Jeux | 52 |
| 10 | Egoi Martínez (ESP) | Euskaltel–Euskadi | 51 |

=== Young rider classification ===
Final young rider classification (1–10)
| Rank | Rider | Team | Time |
|---|---|---|---|
| 1 | Andy Schleck (LUX) | CSC–Saxo Bank | 88h 04' 24" |
| 2 | Roman Kreuziger (CZE) | Liquigas | + 1' 27" |
| 3 | Vincenzo Nibali (ITA) | Liquigas | + 17' 01" |
| 4 | Maxime Monfort (BEL) | Cofidis | + 24' 09" |
| 5 | Eduardo Gonzalo (ESP) | Agritubel | + 1h 08' 34" |
| 6 | Thomas Lövkvist (SWE) | Team Columbia | + 1h 13' 55" |
| 7 | John-Lee Augustyn (RSA) | Barloworld | + 1h 24' 49" |
| 8 | Peter Velits (SVK) | Team Milram | + 1h 38' 17" |
| 9 | Rémy Di Gregorio (FRA) | Française des Jeux | + 1h 38' 22" |
| 10 | Luis León Sánchez (ESP) | Caisse d'Epargne | + 1h 44' 07" |

=== Team classification ===
Final team classification (1–10)
| Rank | Team | Time |
|---|---|---|
| 1 | CSC–Saxo Bank | 263h 29' 57" |
| 2 | Ag2r–La Mondiale | + 15' 35" |
| 3 | Rabobank | + 1h 05' 26" |
| 4 | Euskaltel–Euskadi | + 1h 16' 26" |
| 5 | Silence–Lotto | + 1h 17' 15" |
| 6 | Caisse d'Epargne | + 1h 20' 28" |
| 7 | Team Columbia | + 1h 23' 00" |
| 8 | Lampre | + 1h 26' 24" |
| 9 | Gerolsteiner | + 1h 27' 40" |
| 10 | Crédit Agricole | + 1h 37' 16" |

== Prize money ==
A total prize fund of approximately €3.25 million was awarded throughout the tour. In addition, each team received €51,243 towards expenses of participation, with an additional €1,600 per rider who completed the race, provided that at least seven did so.

| | 1st | 2nd | 3rd | 4th | 5th | Notes |
|---|---|---|---|---|---|---|
| Individual stages | €8,000 | €4,000 | €2,000 | €1,200 | €830 | Prizes down to 20th place (€200). |
| General classification | €450,000 | €200,000 | €100,000 | €70,000 | €50,000 | All finishers earn at least €400. The wearer of the Yellow Jersey each day gets €350. |
| Overall points classification | €25,000 | €15,000 | €10,000 | €4,000 | €3,500 | Additional prize money down to 8th place (€2,000). The leader of the ranking each day gets €300. |
| Intermediate sprints | €800 | €450 | €300 | | | There are 45 such sprints during the tour. |
| Mountains classification | €25,000 | €15,000 | €10,000 | €4,000 | €3,500 | Additional prize money down to 8th place (€2,000). The leader of the ranking each day gets €300. |
| Hors category climbs | €800 | €450 | €300 | | | There are 8 HC cols during the tour. There are additional €5,000 prizes for the riders first over the Tourmalet (stage 10) and the Galibier (stage 17). |
| First category climbs | €650 | €400 | €150 | | | There are 4 such mountains during the tour. |
| Second category climbs | €500 | €250 | | | | There are 5 such climbs during the tour. |
| Third category climbs | €300 | | | | | There are 14 such climbs during the tour. |
| Fourth category climbs | €200 | | | | | There are 26 such climbs during the tour. |
| Young riders' classification | €20,000 | €15,000 | €10,000 | €5,000 | | The first young rider each day gets €500, and the leader of the ranking each day gets €300. |
| Combativity prize | €20,000 | | | | | A prize of €2,000 is awarded for each stage except time trials. |
| Team classification in the Tour de France | €50,000 | €30,000 | €20,000 | €12,000 | €8,000 | The team with the fastest time for its first three finishers each day gets €2,800. |

By tradition, a team's winnings were pooled and shared among the riders and support team. Team CSC, the team of Tour winner Sastre, won the most prize money, more than €600,000. Saunier Duval's prize money was not awarded after the positive tests of Riccardo Riccò.

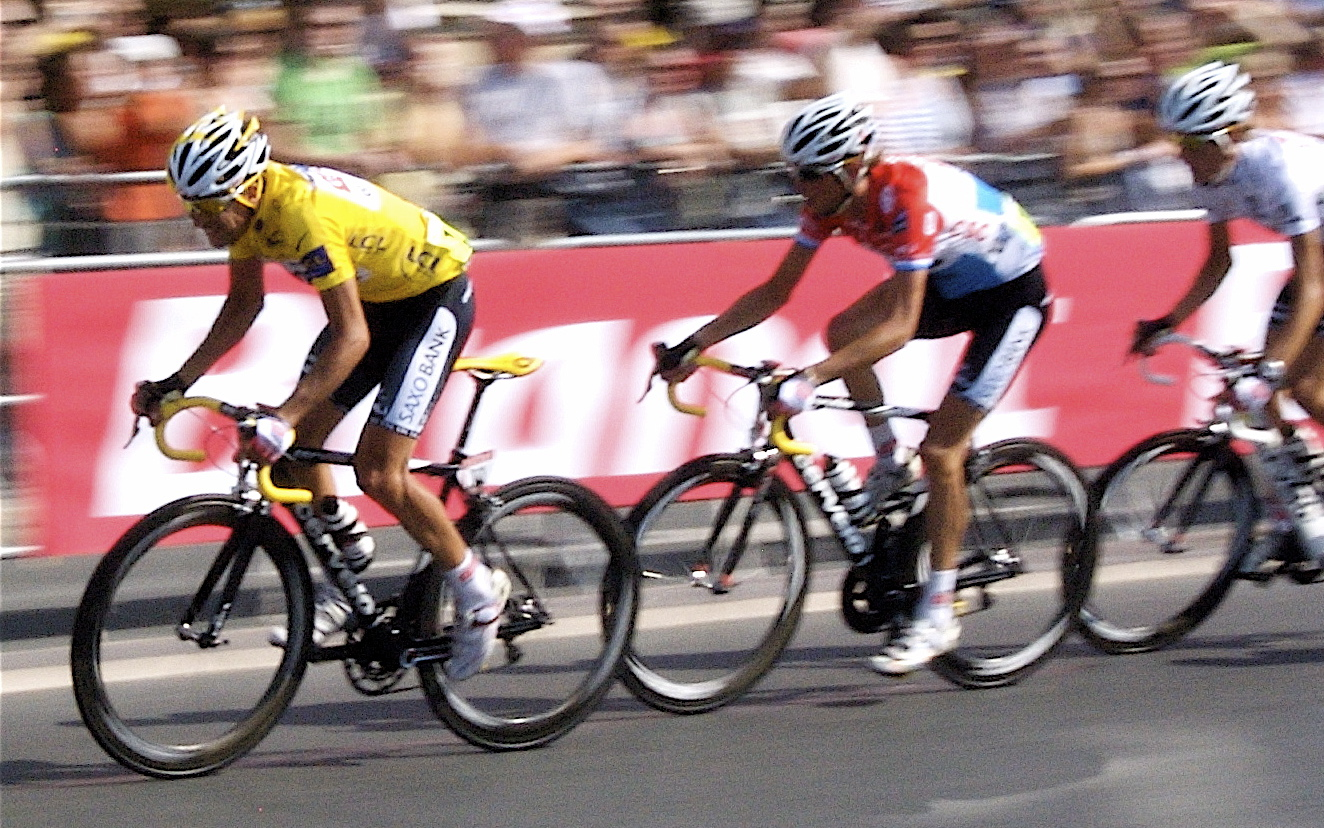
Team CSC received €450,000 for the overall victory of Carlos Sastre.

| | Team name | Prize money |
|---|---|---|
| 1 | Team CSC Saxo Bank | €621,210 |
| 2 | Silence–Lotto | €233,450 |
| 3 | Gerolsteiner | €192,370 |
| 4 | Rabobank | €154,250 |
| 5 | Team Columbia | €113,450 |
| 6 | Cofidis | €91,460 |
| 7 | Garmin–Chipotle | €82,570 |
| 8 | Ag2r–La Mondiale | €71,060 |
| 9 | Caisse d'Epargne | €59,510 |
| 10 | Crédit Agricole | €55,450 |
| 11 | Euskaltel–Euskadi | €53,130 |
| 12 | Liquigas | €49,220 |
| 13 | Française des Jeux | €45,780 |
| 14 | Team Milram | €35,490 |
| 15 | Agritubel | €32,540 |
| 16 | Quick-Step | €31,470 |
| 17 | Bouygues Télécom | €24,900 |
| 18 | Barloworld | €22,480 |
| 19 | Lampre | €9,840 |

== See also ==
- 2008 in road cycling
- List of doping cases in cycling

== Bibliography ==
- Augendre, Jacques (2016). Guide historique [Historical guide] (PDF) (in French). Paris: Amaury Sport Organisation. Archived (PDF) from the original on 17 August 2016.
- Race regulations (PDF). Paris: Amaury Sport Organisation. 2008. Archived from the original (PDF) on 27 March 2009.
