= 2008–09 UCI Europe Tour =

Road bicycle race series

- Fifth edition of the UCI Europe Tour

Details
- Dates: 19 October 2008–15 October 2009
- Location: Europe
- Races: About 300+

Champions
- Individual champion: Giovanni Visconti (ITA) (ISD)
- Teams' champion: Agritubel
- Nations' champion: Italy

The 2008–09 UCI Europe Tour was the fifth season of the UCI Europe Tour. The season began on 19 October 2008 with the Chrono des Nations and ended on 15 October 2009 with the Giro del Piemonte.

The points leader, based on the cumulative results of previous races, wears the UCI Europe Tour cycling jersey. Enrico Gasparotto of Italy was the defending champion of the 2007–08 UCI Europe Tour. Giovanni Visconti was crowned as the 2008–09 UCI Europe Tour.

Throughout the season, points are awarded to the top finishers of stages within stage races and the final general classification standings of each of the stages races and one-day events. The quality and complexity of a race also determines how many points are awarded to the top finishers, the higher the UCI rating of a race, the more points are awarded.

The UCI ratings from highest to lowest are as follows:

- Multi-day events: 2.HC, 2.1 and 2.2
- One-day events: 1.HC, 1.1 and 1.2

== Events ==
=== 2008 ===
Date	Race Name	Location	UCI Rating	Winner	Team
19 October	Chrono des Nations	France	1.1	Stef Clement (NED)	Bouygues Télécom
25 October	Firenze–Pistoia	Italy	1.1	Andriy Hrivko (UKR)	Team Milram

=== 2009 ===
Date	Race Name	Location	UCI Rating	Winner	Team
1 February	Grand Prix d'Ouverture La Marseillaise	France	1.1	Rémi Pauriol (FRA)	Cofidis
4–8 February	Étoile de Bessèges	France	2.1	Thomas Voeckler (FRA)	Bbox Bouygues Telecom
7 February	Gran Premio della Costa Etruschi	Italy	1.1	Alessandro Petacchi (ITA)	LPR Brakes–Farnese Vini
8 February	Trofeo Mallorca	Spain	1.1	Gert Steegmans (BEL)	Team Katusha
9 February	Trofeo Cala Millor-Cala Bona	Spain	1.1	Robbie McEwen (AUS)	Team Katusha
10 February	Trofeo Inca	Spain	1.1	Daniele Bennati (ITA)	Liquigas
11 February	Trofeo Pollença	Spain	1.1	Antonio Colom (ESP)	Team Katusha
11–15 February	Tour Méditerranéen	France	2.1	Luis León Sánchez (ESP)	Caisse d'Epargne
12 February	Trofeo Calvià	Spain	1.1	Gerald Ciolek (GER)	Team Milram
13–15 February	Giro della Provincia di Grosseto	Italy	2.1	Daniele Pietropolli (ITA)	LPR Brakes–Farnese Vini
15–19 February	Vuelta a Andalucía	Spain	2.1	Joost Posthuma (NED)	Rabobank
18–22 February	Volta ao Algarve	Portugal	2.1	Alberto Contador (ESP)	Astana
21 February	Trofeo Laigueglia	Italy	1.1	Francesco Ginanni (ITA)	Diquigiovanni–Androni
21 February	Coppa San Geo	Italy	1.2	Davide Cimolai (ITA)	Team 2000 Veneto Marchiol
21 February	Les Boucles du Sud Ardèche	France	1.2	Freddy Bichot (FRA)	Agritubel
21–22 February	Tour du Haut Var	France	2.1	Thomas Voeckler (FRA)	Bbox Bouygues Telecom
24–28 February	Giro di Sardegna	Italy	2.1	Daniele Bennati (ITA)	Liquigas
27 February – 1 March	Les 3 Jours de Vaucluse	France	2.2	David Lelay (FRA)	Agritubel
28 February	Gran Premio dell'Insubria	Switzerland	1.1	Francesco Ginanni (ITA)	Diquigiovanni–Androni
28 February	Beverbeek Classic	Belgium	1.2	Andreas Schillinger (GER)	Team Nutrixxion–Sparkasse
28 February	Omloop Het Nieuwsblad	Belgium	1.HC	Thor Hushovd (NOR)	Cervélo TestTeam
1 March	Kuurne–Brussels–Kuurne	Belgium	1.1	Tom Boonen (BEL)	Quick-Step
1 March	Clásica de Almería	Spain	1.1	Greg Henderson (NZL)	Team Columbia–High Road
1 March	Gran Premio di Lugano	Switzerland	1.1	Rémi Pauriol (FRA)	Cofidis
1 March	Trofeo Zsšdi	Italy	1.2	Tomislav Dančulović (CRO)	Loborika
4 March	Le Samyn	Belgium	1.1	Wouter Weylandt (BEL)	Quick-Step
4 March	Giro del Friuli	Italy	1.1	Mirco Lorenzetto (ITA)	Lampre–NGC
4–8 March	Vuelta a Murcia	Spain	2.1	Denis Menchov (RUS)	Rabobank
6–8 March	Driedaagse van West-Vlaanderen	Belgium	2.1	Johnny Hoogerland (NED)	Vacansoleil Pro Cycling Team
7 March	Monte Paschi Eroica	Italy	1.1	Thomas Löfkvist (SWE)	Team Columbia–High Road
7 March	De Vlaamse Pijl	Belgium	1.2	Jan Ghyselinck (BEL)	Team Beveren 2000
8 March	Grand Prix de la Ville de Lillers	France	1.2	Aleksejs Saramotins (LAT)	Designa Køkken
8 March	Trofeo Franco Balestra	Italy	1.2	Davide Cimolai (ITA)	Team 2000 Veneto Marchiol
8 March	Poreč Trophy	Croatia	1.2	Ole Haavardsholm (NOR)	Joker–Bianchi
12–15 March	Istrian Spring Trophy	Croatia	2.2	Mitja Mahorič (SLO)	Radenska–KD Financial Point
15 March	Giro del Mendrisiotto	Switzerland	1.2	Ignatas Konovalovas (LTU)	Cervélo TestTeam
15 March	Paris–Troyes	France	1.2	Yannick Talabardon (FRA)	Besson Chaussures–Sojasun
15 March	Omloop van het Waasland	Belgium	1.2	Johan Coenen (BEL)	Topsport Vlaanderen
18 March	Nokere Koerse	Belgium	1.1	Graeme Brown (AUS)	Rabobank
20 March	Classic Loire Atlantique	France	1.2	Cyril Bessy (FRA)	Besson Chaussures–Sojasun
22 March	Cholet-Pays de la Loire	France	1.1	Juan José Haedo (ARG)	Team Saxo Bank
22 March	Ronde van het Groene Hart	Netherlands	1.1	Geert Omloop (BEL)	Palmans–Cras
22 March	La Roue Tourangelle	France	1.2	Arnaud Molmy (FRA)	CC Nogent-sur-Oise
22 March	Gran Premio San Giuseppe	Italy	1.2	Alessandro Malaguti (ITA)	Calzaturieri Montegranaro
23–27 March	Vuelta a Castilla y León	Spain	2.1	Levi Leipheimer (USA)	Astana
23–29 March	Tour de Normandie	France	2.2	Bram Schmitz (NED)	Van Vliet–EBH Elshof
25 March	Dwars door Vlaanderen	Belgium	1.1	Kevin van Impe (BEL)	Quick-Step
24–28 March	Settimana Ciclistica Internazionale	Italy	2.1	Damiano Cunego (ITA)	Lampre–NGC
26–29 March	The Paths of King Nikola	Montenegro	2.2	Radoslav Rogina (CRO)	Loborika
27–29 March	Grand Prix du Portugal	Portugal	2.Ncup	Sergio Luis Henao (COL)	Colombia (national team)
28 March	E3 Prijs Vlaanderen – Harelbeke	Belgium	1.HC	Filippo Pozzato (ITA)	Team Katusha
28 March	Trofeo Edil C	Italy	1.2	Tomas Alberio (ITA)	Bottoli Nordelettrica
28–29 March	Critérium International	France	2.HC	Jens Voigt (GER)	Team Saxo Bank
29 March	Brabantse Pijl	Belgium	1.1	Anthony Geslin (FRA)	Française des Jeux
29 March	Gran Premio de Llodio	Spain	1.1	Samuel Sánchez (ESP)	Euskaltel–Euskadi
31 March – 2 April	Driedaagse van De Panne	Belgium	2.HC	Frederik Willems (BEL)	Liquigas
31 March – 5 April	Settimana Ciclistica Lombarda	Italy	2.1	Daniele Pietropolli (ITA)	LPR Brakes–Farnese Vini
1–5 April	Volta ao Alentejo em Bicicleta	Portugal	2.1	Maxime Bouet (FRA)	Agritubel
1–5 April	Cinturón Ciclista Internacional a Mallorca	Spain	2.2	Sergio Luis Henao (COL)	Colombia es Pasión Coldeportes
2–4 April	Boucle de l'Artois	France	2.2	Sergey Firsanov (RUS)	Designa Køkken
3 April	Route Adélie de Vitré	France	1.1	Jérôme Coppel (FRA)	Française des Jeux
3–5 April	Le Triptyque des Monts et Châteaux	Belgium	2.2	Kris Boeckmans (BEL)	Davo–Lotto–Davitamon
4 April	Hel van het Mergelland	Netherlands	1.1	Mauro Finetto (ITA)	CSF Group–Navigare
4 April	GP Miguel Induráin	Spain	1.HC	David de la Fuente (ESP)	Fuji–Servetto
5 April	Grand Prix de la ville de Nogent-sur-Oise	France	1.2	Martin Pedersen (DEN)	Capinordic
5 April	Trofeo Banca Popolare di Vicenza	Italy	1.2U	Davide Cimolai (ITA)	Team 2000 Veneto Marchiol
7–10 April	Circuit de la Sarthe	France	2.1	David Lelay (FRA)	Agritubel
10–12 April	Circuit des Ardennes International	France	2.2	Dimitri Champion (FRA)	Bretagne–Schuller
11 April	Tour des Flandres Espoirs	Belgium	1.2Ncup	Jan Ghyselinck (BEL)	Belgium (national team)
12 April	Klasika Primavera	Spain	1.1	Alejandro Valverde (ESP)	Caisse d'Epargne
12 April	Grand Prix of Donetsk	Ukraine	1.2	Mart Ojave (EST)	Cycling Club Bourgas
12 April	Ronde van Drenthe	Netherlands	1.1	Maurizio Biondo (ITA)	Ceramica Flaminia–Bossini
12–19 April	Presidential Cycling Tour	Turkey	2.1	Daryl Impey (RSA)	Barloworld
13 April	Giro del Belvedere	Italy	1.2U	Sacha Modolo (ITA)	Zalf Désirée Fior
13 April	Rund um Köln	Germany	1.1	Martin Pedersen (DEN)	Denmark (national team)
14 April	Paris–Camembert	France	1.1	Jimmy Casper (FRA)	Besson Chaussures–Sojasun
14 April	GP Palio del Recioto	Italy	1.2U	Stefano Locatelli (ITA)	De Nardi–Daigo–Bergamasca
14–19 April	Tour du Loir-et-Cher	France	2.2	Dmitry Kosyakov (RUS)	Katusha Continental Team
15 April	Scheldeprijs	Belgium	1.HC	Alessandro Petacchi (ITA)	LPR Brakes–Farnese Vini
15 April	La Côte Picarde	France	1.Ncup	Timofey Kritskiy (RUS)	Russia (national team)
16 April	Grand Prix de Denain	France	1.1	Jimmy Casper (FRA)	Besson Chaussures–Sojasun
16–19 April	Rhône-Alpes Isère Tour	France	2.2	Yann Huguet (FRA)	Agritubel
18 April	Tour du Finistère	France	1.1	Dimitri Champion (FRA)	Bretagne–Schuller
18 April	Gran Premio Nobili Rubinetterie	Italy	1.1	Grega Bole (SLO)	Amica Chips–Knauf
18 April	Liège–Bastogne–Liège Espoirs	Belgium	1.2U	Rasmus Guldhammer (DEN)	Capinordic
18 April	ZLM Tour	Netherlands	1.Ncup	Luke Rowe (GBR)	Great Britain (national team)
19 April	Tro-Bro Léon	France	1.1	Saïd Haddou (FRA)	Bbox Bouygues Telecom
19 April	Rund um Düren	Germany	1.2	Dennis Pohl (GER)	Team Kuota–Indeland
22–25 April	Giro del Trentino	Italy	2.1	Ivan Basso (ITA)	Liquigas
22–26 April	Vuelta a Extremadura	Spain	2.2	José Antonio de Segovia (ESP)	Supermercados Froiz
25 April	Arno Wallaard Memorial	Netherlands	1.2	Lieuwe Westra (NED)	Vacansoleil
25 April	Belgrade–Banja Luka	Bosnia and Herzegovina	1.2	Normunds Lasis (LAT)	Cycling Club Bourgas
25 April	Gran Premio della Liberazione	Italy	1.2U	Sacha Modolo (ITA)	Zalf Désirée Fior
25 April – 1 May	Tour de Bretagne	France	2.2	Julien Fouchard (FRA)	Côtes-d'Armor–Maitre Jacques
26 April	Vuelta a La Rioja	Spain	1.1	David García (ESP)	Xacobeo–Galicia
26 April	Ronde van Noord-Holland	Netherlands	1.2	Theo Bos (NED)	Rabobank Continental Team
26 April	Paris–Mantes-en-Yvelines	France	1.2	Pierre Drancourt (FRA)	ESEG–Douai
26 April	East Midlands Classic	United Kingdom	1.2	Ian Wilkinson (GBR)	Team Halfords
28 April – 2 May	Vuelta a Asturias	Spain	2.1	Francisco Mancebo (ESP)	Rock Racing
1 May	Memoriał Andrzeja Trochanowskiego	Poland	1.2	Mateusz Taciak (POL)	Mroz Continental Team
1 May	Meiprijs–Ereprijs Victor De Bruyne	Belgium	1.2	Denis Flahaut (FRA)	Landbouwkrediet–Colnago
1 May	Rund um den Henninger Turm U23	Germany	1.2U	Jack Bobridge (AUS)	Australia (national team)
1 May	Rund um den Henninger Turm	Germany	1.HC	Fabian Wegmann (GER)	Team Milram
2 May	Grand Prix Herning	Denmark	1.2	René Jørgensen (DEN)	Designa Køkken
2 May	GP Industria & Artigianato	Italy	1.1	Daniele Callegarin (ITA)	Centri della Calzatura
2 May	Ronde van Overijssel	Netherlands	1.2	Kenny van Hummel (NED)	Skil–Shimano
2 May	Mayor Cup	Russia	1.2	Mikhail Antonov (RUS)	Katusha Continental Team
3 May	Giro di Toscana	Italy	1.1	Alessandro Petacchi (ITA)	LPR Brakes–Farnese Vini
3 May	Trophée des Grimpeurs	France	1.1	Thomas Voeckler (FRA)	Bbox Bouygues Telecom
3 May	Subida al Naranco	Spain	1.1	Romain Sicard (FRA)	Orbea
3 May	Circuito del Porto	Italy	1.2	Filippo Baggio (ITA)	Bottoli Nordelettrica
3 May	Memorial Oleg Dyachenko	Russia	1.2	Mikhail Antonov (RUS)	Katusha Continental Team
5–10 May	Four Days of Dunkirk	France	2.HC	Rui Costa (POR)	Caisse d'Epargne
6–10 May	Five Rings of Moscow	Russia	2.2	Timofey Kritskiy (RUS)	Katusha Continental Team
6–10 May	Giro del Friuli Venezia Giulia	Italy	2.2	Gianluca Brambilla (ITA)	Zalf Désirée Fior
8–10 May	Szlakiem Grodów Piastowskich	Poland	2.1	Mariusz Witecki (POL)	Mróz Continental Team
8–10 May	Tour du Haut-Anjou	France	2.2U	Tejay van Garderen (USA)	Rabobank Continental Team
9 May	Scandinavian Race Uppsala	Sweden	1.2	Jonas Jørgensen (DEN)	Capinordic
10 May	Omloop der Kempen	Netherlands	1.2	Theo Bos (NED)	Rabobank Continental Team
10 May	GP Industrie del Marmo	Italy	1.2	Carlos Manarelli (BRA)	Marchiol Pasta Montegrappa
12 May	GP of Moscow	Russia	1.2	Alexander Khatuntsev (RUS)	Moscow
13 May	Batavus Prorace	Netherlands	1.1	Kenny van Hummel (NED)	Skil–Shimano
14–17 May	GP Paredes Rota dos Móveis	Portugal	2.2	Cândido Barbosa (POR)	Palmeiras Resort–Tavira
15–17 May	Tour de Picardie	France	2.1	Lieuwe Westra (NED)	Vacansoleil
16 May	GP Copenhagen	Denmark	1.2	Jacob Nielsen (DEN)	Glud & Marstrand–Horsens
16 May	Dutch Food Valley Classic	Netherlands	1.HC	Kenny van Hummel (NED)	Skil–Shimano
17 May	Tour de Rijke	Netherlands	1.1	Kenny van Hummel (NED)	Skil–Shimano
17–24 May	FBD Insurance Ras	Ireland	2.2	Simon Richardson (GBR)	Rapha Condor
19–24 May	Olympia's Tour	Netherlands	2.2	Jetse Bol (NED)	Rabobank Continental Team
20–24 May	Circuit de Lorraine	France	2.1	Matteo Carrara (ITA)	Vacansoleil
20–24 May	Flèche du Sud	Luxembourg	2.2	Simon Zahner (SUI)	Bürgis Cycling
21–24 May	Ronde de l'Isard	France	2.2U	Alexandre Geniez (FRA)	VC La Pomme Marseille
27–31 May	Ronde van België	Belgium	2.HC	Lars Boom (NED)	Rabobank
27–31 May	Bayern Rundfahrt	Germany	2.HC	Linus Gerdemann (GER)	Team Milram
29 May	Tallinn–Tartu GP	Estonia	1.1	Erki Pütsep (EST)	Cycling Club Bourgas
29 May – 1 June	Tour de Gironde	France	2.2	Stéphane Rossetto (FRA)	CC Nogent-sur-Oise
29 May – 1 June	Tour de Berlin	Germany	2.2U	Franz Schiewer (GER)	LKT Team Brandenburg
30 May	Tartu GP	Estonia	1.1	Hannes Blank (GER)	Continental Team Differdange
30 May	GP Kranj	Slovenia	1.1	Gašper Švab (SLO)	Sava
30 May	Grand Prix de Plumelec-Morbihan	France	1.1	Jérémie Galland (FRA)	Besson Chaussures–Sojasun
30 May	GP Kooperativa	Slovakia	1.2	Peter Sagan (SVK)	Dukla Trenčín–Merida
31 May	Boucles de l'Aulne	France	1.1	Maxime Bouet (FRA)	Agritubel
31 May	Grand Prix Boka	Slovakia	1.2	Juraj Sagan (SVK)	Dukla Trenčín–Merida
31 May	Paris–Roubaix Espoirs	France	1.2U	Taylor Phinney (USA)	Trek–Livestrong
31 May	Trofeo Città di San Vendemiano	Italy	1.2U	Alessandro Mazzi (ITA)	Zalf Désirée Fior
1 June	Neuseen Classics	Germany	1.1	André Greipel (GER)	Team Columbia–High Road
1 June	Rogaland GP	Norway	1.2	Håvard Nybø (NOR)	Sparebanken Vest–Ridley
2 June	Trofeo Alcide Degasperi	Italy	1.2	Pavel Kochetkov (RUS)	Russia (national team)
2–7 June	Baltyk Karkonosze Tour	Poland	2.2	Sergey Kolesnikov (RUS)	Moscow
3–7 June	Ringerike GP	Norway	2.2	Sergey Firsanov (RUS)	Designa Køkken
3–7 June	Tour de Luxembourg	Luxembourg	2.HC	Fränk Schleck (LUX)	Team Saxo Bank
6 June	Memorial Marco Pantani	Italy	1.1	Roberto Ferrari (ITA)	LPR Brakes–Farnese Vini
6 June	GP Triberg-Schwarzwald	Germany	1.1	Heinrich Haussler (GER)	Cervélo TestTeam
6–13 June	Romanian Cycling Tour	Romania	2.2	Alexey Shchebelin (RUS)	SP Tablewere–Gatsoulis Bikes
7 June	Coppa della Pace	Italy	1.2	Egor Silin (RUS)	Russia (national team)
7 June	Coppa Colli Briantei	Italy	1.2	Maurizio Anzalone (ITA)	VC Mendrisio
7 June	Memorial Ph. Van Coningsloo	Belgium	1.2	Gediminas Bagdonas (LTU)	NH Tielen
7 June	Grand Prix of Aargau Canton	Switzerland	1.HC	Peter Velits (SVK)	Team Milram
7–13 June	Thüringen Rundfahrt	Germany	2.2U	Stefan Denifl (AUT)	Austria (national team)
10–16 June	Circuito Montañés	Spain	2.2	Tejay van Garderen (USA)	Rabobank Continental Team
11–14 June	GP CTT Correios	Portugal	2.1	Adrián Palomares (ESP)	Contentpolis–Ampo
11–14 June	Ronde de l'Oise	France	2.2	Steven Van Vooren (BEL)	An Post–Sean Kelly
12–14 June	Delta Tour Zeeland	Netherlands	2.1	Tyler Farrar (USA)	Garmin–Slipstream
12–21 June	Giro Ciclistico d'Italia	Italy	2.2	Cayetano Sarmiento (COL)	Colombia (national team)
15–21 June	Tour de Serbie	Serbia	2.2	Davide Torosantucci (ITA)	Centri della Calzatura
17–21 June	Ster Elektrotoer	Netherlands	2.1	Philippe Gilbert (BEL)	Silence–Lotto
18–20 June	Tour of Małopolska	Poland	2.2	Artur Detko (POL)	DHL–Author
18–21 June	Route du Sud	France	2.1	Przemysław Niemiec (POL)	Miche–Silver Cross
18–21 June	Tour of Slovenia	Slovenia	2.1	Jakob Fuglsang (DEN)	Team Saxo Bank
18–21 June	Boucles de la Mayenne	France	2.2	Janek Tombak (EST)	Cycling Club Bourgas
19–21 June	Tour des Pays de Savoie	France	2.2U	Ben Gastauer (LUX)	Chambéry Cyclisme Formation
19–21 June	Mainfranken-Tour	Germany	2.2U	Sebastian May (GER)	Thüringer Energie Team
21 June	Raiffeisen GP	Austria	1.2	Markus Eibegger (AUT)	Elk Haus
24 June	Giro dell'Appennino	Italy	1.1	Vincenzo Nibali (ITA)	Liquigas
24 June	Halle–Ingooigem	Belgium	1.1	Jurgen Van de Walle (BEL)	Quick-Step
24 June	I.W.T. Jong Maar Moedig	Belgium	1.2	Thomas De Gendt (BEL)	Topsport Vlaanderen–Mercator
1–5 July	Course de la Solidarité Olympique	Poland	2.1	Artur Król (POL)	Centri della Calzatura
2 July	European Road Championships (U23) – Time Trial	Belgium	CC	Marcel Kittel (GER)	Germany (national team)
4 July	Tour du Jura	Switzerland	1.2	Roger Beuchat (SUI)	Team Neotel
4 July	Cronoscalata Gardone Valtrompia	Italy	1.2	Stefano Di Carlo (ITA)	Scap Foresi
5 July	Tour du Doubs	France	1.1	Yann Huguet (FRA)	Agritubel
5 July	Giro Ciclistico Valli Aretine	Italy	1.2	Enrico Battaglin (ITA)	Zalf Désirée Fior
5 July	European Road Championships (U23) – Road Race	Belgium	CC	Kris Boeckmans (BEL)	Belgium (national team)
5–12 July	Tour of Austria	Austria	2.HC	Michael Albasini (SUI)	Team Columbia–HTC
7 July	Trofeo Città di Brescia	Italy	1.2	Andrea Palini (ITA)	Gavardo
8–12 July	GP Torres Vedras	Portugal	2.2	Héctor Guerra (ESP)	Liberty Seguros
10–11 July	GP de Gemenc	Hungary	2.2	Žolt Dér (SRB)	Centri della Calzatura
12 July	Giro del Medio Brenta	Italy	1.2	Christian Delle Stelle (ITA)	Bottoli Nordelettrica
17–19 July	Vuelta a la Comunidad de Madrid	Spain	2.1	Héctor Guerra (ESP)	Liberty Seguros
18 July	Grand Prix Cristal Energie	France	1.2	Martin Pedersen (DEN)	Capinordic
19 July	Giro della Provincia di Reggio Calabria	Italy	1.1	Fortunato Baliani (ITA)	CSF Group–Navigare
19 July	Trophée des Champions	France	1.2	Tony Hurel (FRA)	Vendée U
19 July	Giro del Casentino	Italy	1.2	Roberto Cesaro (ITA)	Ginestra Ceramiche
22–26 July	Sachsen Tour	Germany	2.1	Patrik Sinkewitz (GER)	PSK Whirlpool–Author
22–26 July	Brixia Tour	Italy	2.1	Giampaolo Caruso (ITA)	Ceramica Flaminia–Bossini
25 July	Prueba Villafranca de Ordizia	Spain	1.1	Jaume Rovira (ESP)	Andorra–Grandvalira
25–26 July	Grand Prix Bradlo	Slovakia	1.2	Nebojša Jovanović (SRB)	AC Sparta Prague
25–27 July	Kreiz Breizh Elites	France	2.2	Antoine Dalibard (FRA)	Bretagne–Schuller
25–29 July	Tour de Wallonie	Belgium	2.HC	Julien El Fares (FRA)	Cofidis
26 July	Grand Prix de Pérenchies	France	1.2	Robert Retschke (GER)	Continental Team Differdange
26 July	Gran Premio Inda	Italy	1.2	Pavel Kochetkov (RUS)	Russia (national team)
28 July – 1 August	Dookoła Mazowsza	Poland	2.2	Łukasz Bodnar (POL)	CCC Polsat Polkowice
29 July – 2 August	Tour Alsace	France	2.2	Simon Zahner (SUI)	Burgis Cycling Team
29 July – 2 August	Danmark Rundt	Denmark	2.HC	Jakob Fuglsang (DEN)	Team Saxo Bank
31 July	Circuito de Getxo	Spain	1.1	Koldo Fernández (ESP)	Euskaltel–Euskadi
1 August	Scandinavian Open Road Race	Sweden	1.2	Patrik Stenberg (SWE)	Cykelcity.se
1 August	GP P-Nivo	Hungary	1.2	Uros Silar (SLO)	Sava
2 August	Subida a Urkiola	Spain	1.1	Igor Antón (ESP)	Euskaltel–Euskadi
2 August	Sparkassen Giro Bochum	Germany	1.1	Mark Cavendish (GBR)	Team Columbia–HTC
2 August	La Poly Normande	France	1.1	Mathieu Ladagnous (FRA)	Française des Jeux
2 August	Giro del Cigno	Italy	1.2	Paolo Ciavatta (ITA)	Monturano–Civitanova Marche
2 August	GP Betonexpressz 2000	Hungary	1.2	Gergely Ivanics (HUN)	Betonexpressz 2000–Limonta
4–8 August	Tour des Pyrénées	France	2.2	Fabio Duarte (COL)	Colombia es Pasión Coldeportes
4–8 August	Vuelta a León	Spain	2.2	David Belda (ESP)	Boyacá es Para Vivirla
5 August	GP Folignano	Italy	1.2	Henry Frusto (ITA)	Team SCAP Prefabbricati Foresi
5–6 August	Paris–Corrèze	France	2.1	Francisco Ventoso (ESP)	CarmioOro–A Style
5–9 August	Vuelta a Burgos	Spain	2.HC	Alejandro Valverde (ESP)	Caisse d'Epargne
5–16 August	Volta a Portugal	Portugal	2.HC	David Blanco (ESP)	Palmeiras Resort–Tavira
6 August	Gran Premio Industria e Commercio Artigianato Carnaghese	Italy	1.1	Francesco Ginanni (ITA)	Diquigiovanni–Androni
6–8 August	Tour of Szeklerland	Romania	2.2	Vitaliy Popkov (UKR)	ISD Sport Donetsk
8 August	Gran Premio Città di Camaiore	Italy	1.1	Vincenzo Nibali (ITA)	Liquigas
8–12 August	Tour de l'Ain	France	2.1	Rein Taaramäe (EST)	Cofidis
9 August	Trofeo Internazionale Bastianelli	Italy	1.2	Radoslav Rogina (CRO)	Loborika
11 August	GP Città di Felino	Italy	1.2	Richie Porte (AUS)	Praties
12–15 August	Mi-Août Bretonne	France	2.2	Frederik Wilmann (NOR)	Joker–Bianchi
14 August	Puchar Ministra Obrony Narodowej	Poland	1.2	Tomasz Kiendyś (POL)	CCC–Polsat–Polkowice
15 August	Memoriał Henryka Łasaka	Poland	1.2	Stefan Schäfer (GER)	LKT Team Brandenburg
16 August	GP Capodarco	Italy	1.2	Salvatore Mancuso (ITA)	Lucchini Arvedi Unidelta
16 August	Antwerpse Havenpijl	Belgium	1.2	Jens-Erik Madsen (DEN)	Capinordic
16 August	Puchar Uzdrowisk Karpackich	Poland	1.2	Matthias Belka (GER)	LKT Team Brandenburg
17 August	Gara Ciclistica Montappone	Italy	1.2	Stefano Pirazzi (ITA)	Palazzago Elledent Rad
18 August	Grote Prijs Stad Zottegem	Belgium	1.1	Niko Eeckhout (BEL)	An Post–M.Donnelly–Grant Thornton–Sean Kelly
18 August	Tre Valli Varesine	Italy	1.HC	Mauro Santambrogio (ITA)	Lampre–NGC
18–21 August	Tour du Limousin	France	2.1	Mathieu Perget (FRA)	Caisse d'Epargne
19 August	Coppa Ugo Agostoni	Italy	1.1	Giovanni Visconti (ITA)	ISD–NERI
20 August	Coppa Bernocchi	Italy	1.1	Luca Paolini (ITA)	Acqua & Sapone–Caffè Mokambo
21–23 August	Tour of Ireland	Ireland	2.1	Russell Downing (GBR)	Candi TV–Marshalls Pasta RT
22 August	Trofeo Melinda	Italy	1.1	Giovanni Visconti (ITA)	ISD–NERI
25 August	Grand Prix des Marbriers	France	1.2	Robert Retschke (GER)	Continental Team Differdange
25–28 August	Tour du Poitou-Charentes	France	2.1	Gustav Larsson (SWE)	Team Saxo Bank
25–30 August	Giro della Valle d'Aosta	Italy	2.2	Thibaut Pinot (FRA)	France (national team)
26 August	Druivenkoers Overijse	Belgium	1.1	Aleksejs Saramotins (LAT)	Designa Køkken
26–30 August	Grand Prix Tell	Switzerland	2.2	Mathias Frank (SUI)	BMC Racing Team
29 August	Giro del Veneto	Italy	1.HC	Filippo Pozzato (ITA)	Team Katusha
30 August	Châteauroux Classic de l'Indre	France	1.1	Jimmy Casper (FRA)	Besson Chaussures–Sojasun
30 August	Schaal Sels-Merksem	Belgium	1.1	Kris Boeckmans (BEL)	Silence–Lotto
2–6 September	Tour de Slovaquie	Slovakia	2.2	Leigh Howard (AUS)	Australia (national team)
5–13 September	Tour de l'Avenir	France	2.Ncup	Romain Sicard (FRA)	France (national team A)
6 September	Grote Prijs Jef Scherens	Belgium	1.1	Sebastian Langeveld (NED)	Rabobank
6 September	Giro della Romagna	Italy	1.1	Murilo Fischer (BRA)	Liquigas
6 September	Ljubljana–Zagreb	Slovenia	1.2	Robert Vrečer (SLO)	Adria Mobil
6 September	Memorial Davide Fardelli	Italy	1.2	Manuele Boaro (ITA)	Zalf Désirée Fior
6–13 September	Tour of Bulgaria	Bulgaria	2.2	Ivaïlo Gabrovski (BUL)	Heraklion–Nessebar
9 September	Memorial Rik Van Steenbergen	Belgium	1.1	Niko Eeckhout (BEL)	An Post–Sean Kelly Team
12 September	Paris–Brussels	Belgium	1.HC	Matthew Goss (AUS)	Team Saxo Bank
12–19 September	Tour of Britain	United Kingdom	2.1	Edvald Boasson Hagen (NOR)	Team Columbia–HTC
13 September	Rund um die Nürnberger Altstadt	Germany	1.1	Francesco Gavazzi (ITA)	Lampre–NGC
13 September	Chrono Champenois	France	1.2	Adriano Malori (ITA)	Bottoli Nordelettrica
13 September	Grand Prix de Fourmies	France	1.HC	Romain Feillu (FRA)	Agritubel
16 September	Grand Prix de Wallonie	Belgium	1.1	Nick Nuyens (BEL)	Rabobank
17 September	Kroz Vojvodina I	Serbia	1.2	Matej Marin (SLO)	Perutnina Ptuj
18 September	Kampioenschap van Vlaanderen	Belgium	1.1	Steven de Jongh (NED)	Quick-Step
18 September	Grand Prix de la Somme	France	1.1	Yauheni Hutarovich (BLR)	Française des Jeux
18 September	Kroz Vojvodina II	Serbia	1.2	Ivaïlo Gabrovski (BUL)	Heraklion–Nessebar
19 September	Prague–Karlovy Vary–Prague	Czech Republic	1.2	Danilo Hondo (GER)	PSK Whirlpool–Author
20 September	Grand Prix d'Isbergues	France	1.1	Benoît Vaugrenard (FRA)	Française des Jeux
20 September	Gran Premio Industria e Commercio di Prato	Italy	1.1	Giovanni Visconti (ITA)	ISD–NERI
20 September	Duo Normand	France	1.2	Nikolay Trusov (RUS); Artem Ovechkin (RUS)	Team Katusha
20 September	Trofeo Gianfranco Bianchin	Italy	1.2	José Bone (ECU)	VC Mantovani
23 September	Omloop van het Houtland	Belgium	1.1	Graeme Brown (AUS)	Rabobank
25–27 September	Tour du Gévaudan	France	2.2	David Rösch (GER)	Atlas–Romer's Hausbäckerei
29 September	Ruota d'Oro	Italy	1.2	Emanuele Moschen (ITA)	Lucchini Arvedi Unidelta
1–4 October	Circuit Franco-Belge	Belgium	2.1	Tyler Farrar (USA)	Garmin–Slipstream
2–4 October	Cinturó de l'Empordà	Spain	2.2	Francisco Ventoso (ESP)	CarmioOro–A Style
3 October	Sparkassen Münsterland Giro	Germany	1.1	Aleksejs Saramotins (LAT)	Team Designa Køkken
3 October	Memorial Cimurri	Italy	1.1	Filippo Pozzato (ITA)	Team Katusha
4 October	Tour de Vendée	France	1.1	Pavel Brutt (RUS)	Team Katusha
8 October	Paris–Bourges	France	1.1	André Greipel (GER)	Team Columbia–HTC
8 October	Coppa Sabatini	Italy	1.1	Philippe Gilbert (BEL)	Silence–Lotto
10 October	Giro dell'Emilia	Italy	1.HC	Robert Gesink (NED)	Rabobank
11 October	G.P. Beghelli	Italy	1.1	Francisco Ventoso (ESP)	CarmioOro–A Style
11 October	Paris–Tours Espoirs	France	1.2U	Mathieu Halleguen (FRA)	Côtes d'Armor–Maître Jacques
11 October	Paris–Tours	France	1.HC	Philippe Gilbert (BEL)	Silence–Lotto
13 October	Nationale Sluitingsprijs	Belgium	1.1	Denis Flahaut (FRA)	Landbouwkrediet–Colnago
15 October	Giro del Piemonte	Italy	1.HC	Philippe Gilbert (BEL)	Silence–Lotto

== Final ranking ==
There is a competition for the rider, team and country with the most points gained from winning or achieving a high place in the above races.

=== Individual classification ===
Rank	Name	Points
1	Giovanni Visconti (ITA)	638.2
2	Kenny van Hummel (NED)	601
3	Jimmy Casper (FRA)	575
4	Romain Feillu (FRA)	488
5	Alessandro Petacchi (ITA)	469.2
6	David Lelay (FRA)	446
7	Luca Paolini (ITA)	377
8	Héctor Guerra (ESP)	366
9	Rubén Plaza (ESP)	360
10	Aleksejs Saramotins (LAT)	348

=== Team classification ===
Rank	Team	Points
1	Agritubel	2088
2	Vacansoleil	1499
3	Liberty Seguros	1326
4	Cervélo TestTeam	1261
5	ISD	1249.79
6	Skil–Shimano	1224
7	Diquigiovanni–Androni	1210
8	Besson Chaussures–Sojasun	1208
9	LPR Brakes–Farnese Vini	1120.8
10	Ceramica Flaminia–Bossini Docce	1029

=== Nation classification ===
Rank	Nation	Points
1	Italy	3357.6
2	France	3159
3	Spain	2259.4
4	Netherlands	2114.19
5	Germany	2101
6	Slovenia	1854
7	Belgium	1805
8	Russia	1534
9	Portugal	1455
10	Poland	1297

=== Nation under-23 classification ===
Rank	Nation under-23	Points
1	Belgium	909
2	France	872
3	Italy	819.98
4	Germany	818.32
5	Russia	692
6	Netherlands	541.59
7	Slovenia	367
8	Denmark	356
9	Slovakia	268
10	Great Britain	259.2
