= 2007–08 UCI Europe Tour =

Road bicycle race series

- Fourth edition of the UCI Europe Tour

Details
- Dates: 21 October 2007–16 October 2008
- Location: Europe
- Races: About 300+

Champions
- Individual champion: Enrico Gasparotto (ITA) (Barloworld)
- Teams' champion: Acqua & Sapone–Caffè Mokambo
- Nations' champion: Italy

The 2007–08 UCI Europe Tour was the fourth season of the UCI Europe Tour. The season began on 21 October 2007 with the Chrono des Nations and ended on 16 October 2008 with the Giro del Piemonte.

The points leader, based on the cumulative results of previous races, wears the UCI Europe Tour cycling jersey. Alessandro Bertolini of Italy was the defending champion of the 2006–07 UCI Europe Tour. Enrico Gasparotto was crowned as the 2007–08 UCI Europe Tour.

Throughout the season, points are awarded to the top finishers of stages within stage races and the final general classification standings of each of the stages races and one-day events. The quality and complexity of a race also determines how many points are awarded to the top finishers, the higher the UCI rating of a race, the more points are awarded.

The UCI ratings from highest to lowest are as follows:

- Multi-day events: 2.HC, 2.1 and 2.2
- One-day events: 1.HC, 1.1 and 1.2

== Events ==
=== 2007 ===
Date	Race name	Location	UCI Rating	Winner	Team
21 October	Chrono des Nations Les Herbiers Vendée	France	1.1	László Bodrogi (HUN)	Crédit Agricole
27 October	Firenze–Pistoia	Italy	1.1	Boris Shpilevsky (RUS)	Kio Ene–Tonazzi–DMT

=== 2008 ===
Date	Race name	Location	UCI Rating	Winner	Team
3 February	Grand Prix d'Ouverture La Marseillaise	France	1.1	Hervé Duclos-Lassalle (FRA)	Cofidis
6–10 February	Étoile de Bessèges	France	2.1	Yuri Trofimov (RUS)	Bouygues Télécom
9 February	Gran Premio della Costa Etruschi	Italy	1.1	Alessandro Petacchi (ITA)	Team Milram
10 February	Trofeo Mallorca	Spain	1.1	Philippe Gilbert (BEL)	Française des Jeux
11 February	Trofeo Cala Millor-Cala Bona	Spain	1.1	Graeme Brown (AUS)	Rabobank
11–13 February	Challenge Calabria	Italy	2.1	Daniele Pietropolli (ITA)	LPR Brakes–Ballan
12 February	Trofeo Pollença	Spain	1.1	José Joaquín Rojas (ESP)	Caisse d'Epargne
13 February	Trofeo Soller	Spain	1.1	Philippe Gilbert (BEL)	Française des Jeux
13–17 February	Tour Méditerranéen	France	2.1	Alexander Bocharov (RUS)	Crédit Agricole
14 February	Trofeo Calvià	Spain	1.1	Gert Steegmans (BEL)	Quick-Step
15–17 February	Giro della Provincia di Grosseto	Italy	2.1	Filippo Pozzato (ITA)	Liquigas
17–21 February	Vuelta a Andalucía	Spain	2.1	Pablo Lastras (ESP)	Caisse d'Epargne
20–24 February	Volta ao Algarve	Portugal	2.1	Stijn Devolder (BEL)	Quick-Step
23 February	Trofeo Laigueglia	Italy	1.1	Luca Paolini (ITA)	Acqua & Sapone–Caffè Mokambo
23 February	Coppa San Geo	Italy	1.2	Michele Merlo (ITA)	Velo Club Mantovani
23 February	Les Boucles du Sud Ardèche	France	1.2	Gatis Smukulis (LAT)	VC La Pomme Marseille
24 February	Tour du Haut Var	France	1.1	Davide Rebellin (ITA)	Gerolsteiner
26 February–1 March	Volta a la Comunitat Valenciana	Spain	2.1	Rubén Plaza (ESP)	Benfica
29 February–2 March	Les 3 Jours de Vaucluse	France	2.2	Nicolas Vogondy (FRA)	Agritubel
1 March	Beverbeek Classic	Belgium	1.2	Johan Coenen (BEL)	Topsport Vlaanderen
1 March	Omloop Het Volk	Belgium	1.HC	Philippe Gilbert (BEL)	Française des Jeux
2 March	Gran Premio di Lugano	Switzerland	1.1	Rinaldo Nocentini (ITA)	Ag2r–La Mondiale
2 March	Clásica de Almería	Spain	1.1	Juan José Haedo (ARG)	Team CSC
2 March	Kuurne–Brussels–Kuurne	Belgium	1.1	Steven de Jongh (NED)	Quick-Step
2 March	Trofeo Zsšdi	Italy	1.2	Manuele Boaro (ITA)	Zalf Désirée Fior
4–8 March	Vuelta Ciclista a Murcia	Spain	2.1	Alejandro Valverde (ESP)	Caisse d'Epargne
5 March	Le Samyn	Belgium	1.1	Philippe Gilbert (BEL)	Française des Jeux
7–9 March	Driedaagse van West-Vlaanderen	Belgium	2.1	Bobbie Traksel (NED)	P3 Transfer–Batavus
8 March	De Vlaamse Pijl	Belgium	1.2	Bram Schmitz (NED)	Van Vliet–EBH Elshof
9 March	Monte Paschi Eroica	Italy	1.1	Fabian Cancellara (SUI)	Team CSC
9 March	Grand Prix de la Ville de Lillers	France	1.2	Dominic Klemme (GER)	Team 3C-Gruppe
9 March	Trofeo Franco Balestra	Italy	1.2	Wojciech Dybel (POL)	MGK Vis Norda
9 March	Poreč Trophy	Croatia	1.2	Aldo Ino Ilešič (SLO)	Sava
13–16 March	Istrian Spring Trophy	Croatia	2.2	Eddy Ratti (ITA)	Nippo–Endeka
13–16 March	Volta ao Distrito de Santarém	Portugal	2.1	Maurizio Biondo (ITA)	Ceramica Flaminia–Bossini Docce
16 March	Giro del Mendrisiotto	Switzerland	1.2	Eddy Serri (ITA)	Miche–Silver Cross
16 March	Paris–Troyes	France	1.2	Jean-Luc Delpech (FRA)	Bretagne–Armor Lux
16 March	Omloop van het Waasland – Kemzeke	Belgium	1.2	Niko Eeckhout (BEL)	Topsport Vlaanderen
19 March	Nokere Koerse	Belgium	1.1	Wouter Weylandt (BEL)	Quick-Step
20–23 March	The Paths of King Nikola	Montenegro	2.2	Mitja Mahorič (SLO)	Perutnina Ptuj
21 March	Classic Loire Atlantique	France	1.2	Mikel Gaztañaga (ESP)	Agritubel
23 March	Cholet-Pays de la Loire	France	1.1	Janek Tombak (EST)	Mitsubishi–Jartazi
23 March	Campina Ronde van het Groene Hart	Netherlands	1.1	Tomas Vaitkus (LTU)	Astana
23 March	GP San Giuseppe	Italy	1.2	Damian Walczak (POL)	MGK Vis Norda
23 March	La Roue Tourangelle	France	1.2	Vitaly Kondrut (UKR)	ISD Sport Donetsk
24 March	Giro del Belvedere	Italy	1.2U	Davide Malacarne (ITA)	Lucchini Nuova Comauto
24–28 March	Vuelta a Castilla y León	Spain	2.1	Alberto Contador (ESP)	Astana
24–30 March	Tour de Normandie	France	2.2	Antoine Dalibard (FRA)	Bretagne–Armor Lux
25 March	GP Palio del Recioto	Italy	1.2U	Gianluca Brambilla (ITA)	Zalf Désirée Fior
25–29 March	Settimana Ciclistica Internazionale	Italy	2.1	Cadel Evans (AUS)	Silence–Lotto
26 March	Dwars door Vlaanderen	Belgium	1.1	Sylvain Chavanel (FRA)	Cofidis
28–30 March	Grand Prix du Portugal	Portugal	2.Ncup	Vitor Rodrigues (POR)	Portugal (national team A)
29 March	E3 Prijs Vlaanderen	Belgium	1.HC	Kurt Asle Arvesen (NOR)	Team CSC
29–30 March	Critérium International	France	2.HC	Jens Voigt (GER)	Team CSC
30 March	Brabantse Pijl	Belgium	1.1	Sylvain Chavanel (FRA)	Cofidis
30 March	Gran Premio de Llodio	Spain	1.1	Héctor Guerra (ESP)	Liberty Seguros
1–3 April	KBC-Driedaagse De Panne-Koksijde	Belgium	2.HC	Joost Posthuma (NED)	Rabobank
2–6 April	Cinturón Ciclista a Mallorca	Spain	2.2U	Dirk Müller (GER)	Team Sparkasse
2–6 April	Settimana Ciclistica Lombarda	Italy	2.1	Danilo Di Luca (ITA)	LPR Brakes–Ballan
4 April	Route Adélie	France	1.1	Kevin Ista (BEL)	Agritubel
4–5 April	Boucle de l'Artois	France	1.2	Timofey Kritskiy (RUS)	Team Katusha
4–6 April	Le Triptyque des Monts et Châteaux	Belgium	2.2	Thomas De Gendt (BEL)	Cycling Team Davo
5 April	Hel van het Mergelland	Netherlands	1.1	Tony Martin (GER)	Team High Road
5 April	GP Miguel Induráin	Spain	1.HC	Fabian Wegmann (GER)	Gerolsteiner
6 April	GP de la Ville de Rennes	France	1.1	Mikhaylo Khalilov (UKR)	Ceramica Flaminia–Bossini Docce
6 April	Trofeo Banca Popolare di Vicenza	Italy	1.2U	Roman Maximov (RUS)	Cycling Team Friuli
8–11 April	Circuit Cycliste Sarthe	France	2.1	Thomas Voeckler (FRA)	Bouygues Télécom
9–13 April	Volta ao Alentejo em Bicicleta	Portugal	2.1	Héctor Guerra (ESP)	Liberty Seguros
10 April	Grand Prix Pino Cerami	Belgium	1.1	Patrick Calcagni (SUI)	Barloworld
11–13 April	Circuit des Ardennes	France	2.2	Martin Pedersen (DEN)	Team GLS
12 April	Albert Achterhes Profronde van Drenthe	Netherlands	1.1	Coen Vermeltfoort (NED)	Rabobank
12 April	Ronde van Vlaanderen U23	Belgium	1.2U	Gatis Smukulis (LAT)	La Pomme Marseille
13 April	Klasika Primavera	Spain	1.1	Damiano Cunego (ITA)	Lampre
13–20 April	Presidential Cycling Tour	Turkey	2.1	David García (ESP)	Karpin–Galicia
15 April	Paris–Camembert Lepetit	France	1.1	Alejandro Valverde (ESP)	Caisse d'Epargne
16 April	Scheldeprijs	Belgium	1.HC	Mark Cavendish (GBR)	Team High Road
16 April	La Côte Picarde	France	1.Ncup	Kristjan Koren (SLO)	Slovenia (national team)
16–20 April	Tour du Loir-et-Cher	France	2.2	Christofer Stevenson (SWE)	Team GLS–Pakke Shop
17 April	Grand Prix de Denain	France	1.1	Edvald Boasson Hagen (NOR)	Team High Road
17–20 April	Rhône-Alpes Isère Tour	France	2.2	Jérémie Derangere (FRA)	SCO Dijon
19 April	Tour du Finistère	France	1.1	David Lelay (FRA)	Bretagne–Armor Lux
19 April	Liège–Bastogne–Liège	Belgium	1.2U	Jan Bakelants (BEL)	Beveren 2000–Quick-Step
19 April	ZLM Tour	Netherlands	1.Ncup	Jacopo Guarnieri (ITA)	Italy (national team)
19–23 April	Grand Prix of Sochi	Russia	2.2	Dirk Müller (GER)	Team Sparkasse
20 April	Tro-Bro Léon	France	1.1	Frédéric Guesdon (FRA)	Française des Jeux
20 April	Giro d'Oro	Italy	1.1	Gabriele Bosisio (ITA)	LPR Brakes–Ballan
20 April	Belgrade–Banja Luka I	Serbia	1.2	Matej Stare (SLO)	Perutnina Ptuj
20 April	Rund um Düren	Germany	1.2	Bram Schmitz (NED)	Van Vliet–EBH Elshof
22–25 April	Giro del Trentino	Italy	2.1	Vincenzo Nibali (ITA)	Liquigas
23–27 April	Vuelta Ciclista Internacional a Extremadura	Spain	2.2	Daniel Lloyd (GBR)	An Post–M Donnelly–Grant Thornton–Sean Kelly Team
25 April	Gran Premio della Liberazione	Italy	1.2U	Andrea Grendene (ITA)	Filmop Sorelle Ramonda Bottoli
25–27 April	Vuelta Ciclista a la Rioja	Spain	2.1	Manuel Calvente (ESP)	Contentpolis–Murcia
25 April–1 May	Le Tour de Bretagne Cycliste	France	2.2	Benoît Poilvet (FRA)	Bretagne–Armor Lux
26 April–1 May	Giro delle Regioni	Italy	2.Ncup	Vitaly Buts (UKR)	Ukraine (national team)
27 April	Int. Ronde van Noord-Holland	Netherlands	1.1	Robert Wagner (GER)	Skil–Shimano
27 April	Paris–Mantes-en-Yvelines	France	1.2	Florian Morizot (FRA)	Auber 93
27 April	East Midlands International Cicle Classic	United Kingdom	1.2	Ciarán Power (IRL)	Pezula Racing
30 April–4 May	Flèche du Sud	Luxembourg	2.2	Marcel Wyss (SUI)	Atlas–Romer's Hausbäckerei
1 May	Subida al Naranco	Spain	1.1	Xavier Tondo (ESP)	LA–MSS
1 May	meiprijs – Ereprijs Victor De Bruyne	Belgium	1.2	Bobbie Traksel (NED)	P3 Transfer–Batavus
1 May	Memoriał Andrzeja Trochanowskiego	Poland	1.2	Tomasz Kiendyś (POL)	CCC–Polsat–Polkowice
1 May	GP Copenhagen Classic	Denmark	1.2	Allan Johansen (DEN)	Team Designa Køkken
1 May	Rund um den Henninger Turm U23	Germany	1.2U	Stefan Denifl (AUT)	Austria (national team)
1 May	Rund um den Henninger Turm	Germany	1.HC	Karsten Kroon (NED)	Team CSC
1–3 May	Volta da Ascension	Spain	2.2	Pablo De Pedro (ESP)	Supermercados Froiz
2 May	Grand Prix of Moscow	Russia	1.2	Olegs Melehs (LAT)	Dynatek – Latvia
3 May	GP Industria & Artigianato di Larciano	Italy	1.1	Eddy Ratti (ITA)	Nippo–Endeka
3 May	Ronde van Overijssel	Netherlands	1.2	Robin Chaigneau (NED)	Asito–Löwik
3 May	Memorial Oleg Dyachenko	Russia	1.2	Timofey Kritsky (RUS)	Team Katusha
3 May	Grand Prix Bourgas	Bulgaria	1.2	Pavel Chumanov (BUL)	Hemus 1896
3 May	Majowy Wyscig Klasyczny – Lublin	Poland	1.2	Mateusz Mróz (POL)	CCC–Polsat–Polkowice
3–7 May	Vuelta a Asturias	Spain	2.1	Ángel Vicioso (ESP)	LA–MSS
4 May	Giro di Toscana	Italy	1.1	Mattia Gavazzi (ITA)	Preti Mangimi
4 May	Trophée des Grimpeurs	France	1.1	David Lelay (FRA)	Bretagne–Armor Lux
4 May	Circuito del Porto	Italy	1.2	Michele Nodari (ITA)	Italy (national team)
4 May	Tour de Berne	Switzerland	1.2U	Jarosław Marycz (POL)	Team Fidibc.Com
6–11 May	Four Days of Dunkirk	France	2.HC	Stéphane Augé (FRA)	Cofidis
7–11 May	Five Rings of Moscow	Russia	2.2	Denis Galimzyanov (RUS)	Team Katusha
7–11 May	Giro del Friuli	Italy	2.2	Hrvoje Miholjević (CRO)	BK Loborika
8–11 May	Szlakiem Grodów Piastowskich	Poland	2.1	Bartosz Huzarski (POL)	Poland (national team)
8–11 May	Tour of Chalkidiki	Greece	2.2	Daniel Petrov (BUL)	Cycling Club Bourgas
9–11 May	Tour du Haut-Anjou	France	2.2U	Dennis Van Winden (NED)	Rabobank
9–12 May	Tour de Berlin	Germany	2.2U	Travis Meyer (AUS)	Southaustralia.com–AIS
10 May	Scandinavian Race Uppsala	Sweden	1.2	Morten Høberg (DEN)	Team Løgstør–Cycling for Health
10–11 May	Clásica Internacional a Alcobendas y Collado Villalba	Spain	2.1	Ezequiel Mosquera (ESP)	Karpin–Galicia
11 May	GP Industrie del Marmo	Italy	1.2	Simone Stortoni (ITA)	Neri Lucchini Nuova Comauto
11 May	Omloop der Kempen	Netherlands	1.2	Job Vissers (NED)	Dommelstreek
12 May	Neuseen Classics – Rund um die Braunkohle	Germany	1.1	Steffen Radochla (GER)	Elk Haus
13 May	Mayor Cup	Russia	1.2	Timofey Kritskiy (RUS)	Team Katusha
14 May	Profronde van Fryslan	Netherlands	1.1	Gert Steegmans (BEL)	Quick-Step
15–18 May	GP Internacional Paredes Rota dos Móveis	Portugal	2.1	Pedro Cardoso (POR)	LA–MSS
16–18 May	Tour de Picardie	France	2.1	Sébastien Chavanel (FRA)	Française des Jeux
17 May	Classic Beograd–Čačak	Serbia	1.2	Mitja Mandril (SLO)	Perutnina Ptuj
17 May	Grand Prix Jasnej Góry	Poland	1.2	Tomasz Kiendyś (POL)	CCC Polsat–Polkowice
17–25 May	Olympia's Tour	Netherlands	2.2	Lars Boom (NED)	Rabobank
18 May	Coppa Caivano	Italy	1.2	Samuele Marzoli (ITA)	NGC–Pagnoncelli–Perrel
18 May	Raiffeisen Grand Prix	Austria	1.2	Matej Stare (SLO)	Perutnina Ptuj
18–25 May	FBD Insurance Ras	Ireland	2.2	Stephen Gallagher (IRL)	An Post–M Donnelly–Grant Thornton–Sean Kelly Team
21–25 May	Circuit de Lorraine	France	2.1	Steve Chainel (FRA)	Auber 93
22–25 May	Ronde de l'Isard	France	2.2U	Guillaume Bonnafond (FRA)	Chambéry C.F.
23 May	E.O.S. Tallinn GP	Estonia	1.1	Mart Ojavee (EST)	Rietumu Banka–Riga
23 May	GP Hydraulika Mikolasek	Slovakia	1.2	Péter Kusztor (HUN)	P-Nívó Betonexpressz 2000 Corratec
24 May	SEB Tartu GP	Estonia	1.1	Aleksejs Saramotins (LAT)	Rietumu Banka–Riga
24 May	GP Kooperativa	Slovakia	1.2	Esad Hasanović (SRB)	Serbia (national team)
25 May	Neuseen Classics – Rund um die Braunkohle	Germany	1.1	Steffen Radochla (GER)	Team Wiesenhof–Felt
25 May	Grand Prix Palma	Slovakia	1.2	Christoph Meschenmoser (GER)	Team Ista
25 May	Velika Nagrada Ptuja	Slovenia	1.2	Gregor Gazvoda (SLO)	Perutnina Ptuj
27 May–1 June	Vuelta a Navarra	Spain	2.2	Diego Tamayo (COL)	Azpiro Ugarte
28 May–1 June	Tour of Belgium	Belgium	2.1	Stijn Devolder (BEL)	Quick-Step
28 May–1 June	Bayern Rundfahrt	Germany	2.HC	Christian Knees (GER)	Team Milram
29 May–1 June	Tour de Gironde	France	2.2	Julien Guay (FRA)	Vendée U
31 May	Grand Prix de Plumelec-Morbihan	France	1.1	Thomas Voeckler (FRA)	Bouygues Télécom
31 May	GP Kranj	Slovenia	1.2	Grega Bole (SLO)	Adria Mobil
1 June	Boucles de l'Aulne	France	1.1	Romain Feillu (FRA)	Agritubel
1 June	Riga GP	Latvia	1.2	Normunds Lasis (LAT)	Dynatek-Latvia
1 June	Coppa della Pace – Trofeo F.lli Anelli	Italy	1.2	Ben Swift (GBR)	Great Britain (national team)
1 June	Paris–Roubaix Espoirs	France	1.2U	Coen Vermeltfoort (NED)	Rabobank
2 June	Trofeo Alcide Degasperi	Italy	1.2	Jarosław Marycz (POL)	Team Fdbc
2–7 June	Volta a Lleida	Spain	2.2	Lars Boom (NED)	Rabobank
4–8 June	Ringerike GP	Norway	2.2	Daniel Kreutzfeldt (DEN)	Team Odense Energi
4–8 June	Skoda-Tour de Luxembourg	Luxembourg	2.HC	Joost Posthuma (NED)	Rabobank
4–8 June	Euskal Bizikleta	Spain	2.HC	Eros Capecchi (ITA)	Saunier Duval–Scott
7 June	GP Triberg-Schwarzwald	Germany	1.1	Mathias Frank (SUI)	Gerolsteiner
7 June	Memorial Marco Pantani	Italy	1.1	Enrico Rossi (ITA)	NGC Medical–OTC Industria Porte
8 June	Memorial Ph. Van Coningsloo	Belgium	1.2	Stijn Joseph (BEL)	Beveren 2000–Quick-Step
8 June	Coppa Colli Briantei Internazionale	Italy	1.2	Leigh Howard (AUS)	Australia (national team)
8 June	Trofeo Città di San Vendemiano	Italy	1.2U	Simon Clarke (AUS)	Southaustralia.com–AIS
8 June	Grand Prix of Aargau Canton	Switzerland	1.HC	Lloyd Mondory (FRA)	Ag2r–La Mondiale
8–14 June	Romanian Cycling Tour	Romania	2.2	Rida Cador (HUN)	P-Nívó Betonexpressz 2000 Corratec
10–14 June	Tour of Slovenia	Slovenia	2.1	Jure Golčer (SLO)	LPR Brakes–Ballan
10–15 June	Thüringen Rundfahrt der U23	Germany	2.2U	Patrick Gretsch (GER)	Thüringer Energie Team
11 June	Dutch Food Valley Classic	Netherlands	1.HC	Robert Förster (GER)	Gerolsteiner
11–17 June	Circuito Montañés	Spain	2.2	Alexey Shchebelin (RUS)	Cinelli–OPD
12–15 June	GP Internacional CTT Correios de Portugal	Portugal	2.1	Nuno Ribeiro (POR)	Liberty Seguros
12–15 June	Ronde de l'Oise	France	2.2	Niels Brouzes (FRA)	Auber 93
13–15 June	Zeeuws Wielerweekend	Netherlands	2.1	Chris Sutton (AUS)	Slipstream–Chipotle
16–22 June	Tour de Serbie	Serbia	2.2	Matija Kvasina (CRO)	Perutnina Ptuj
17–21 June	Ster Elektrotoer	Netherlands	2.1	Enrico Gasparotto (ITA)	Barloworld
19–22 June	Route du Sud	France	2.1	Dan Martin (IRL)	Slipstream–Chipotle
19–22 June	Boucles de la Mayenne	France	2.2	Freddy Bichot (FRA)	Agritubel
20 June	Abersavenny Critérium International	United Kingdom	1.2	Russell Downing (GBR)	Pinarello
20–22 June	Mainfranken-Tour	Germany	2.2U	Mykhaylo Kononenko (UKR)	Ukraine (national team)
22 June	GP Nordjylland	Denmark	1.2	Daniel Holm Foder (DEN)	Team Løgstør
22 June	Grand Prix of Wales	United Kingdom	1.2	Russell Downing (GBR)	Pinarello
25 June	Halle–Ingooigem	Belgium	1.1	Gert Steegmans (BEL)	Quick-Step
25 June	Internationale Wielertrofee Jong Maar Moedig	Belgium	1.2	Stijn Neirynck (BEL)	Beveren 2000–Quick-Step
1 July	Trofeo Città di Brescia	Italy	1.2	Giuseppe De Maria (ITA)	Brunero Camel
2–6 July	Course de la Solidarité Olympique	Poland	2.1	Łukasz Bodnar (POL)	DHL–Author
3 July	European Road Championships (U23) – Time Trial	Italy	CC	Adriano Malori (ITA)	Italy (national team)
5 July	Tour du Jura	Switzerland	1.2	Massimiliano Maisto (ITA)	NGC Medical–OTC Industria Porte
5 July	European Road Championships (U23) – Road Race	Italy	CC	Cyril Gautier (FRA)	France (national team)
6 July	Tour du Doubs	France	1.1	Anthony Geslin (FRA)	Bouygues Télécom
6 July	Giro delle Valli Aretine	Italy	1.2	Enrico Zen (ITA)	Filmop Sorelle Ramonda Bottoli
6 July	De Drie Zustersteden	Belgium	1.2	Nicky Cocquyt (BEL)	Rock Werchter–Chocolat Jacques
6–13 July	Tour of Austria	Austria	2.HC	Thomas Rohregger (AUT)	Elk Haus-Simplon
9–12 July	GP Cycliste de Gemenc	Hungary	2.2	Davide Torosantucci (ITA)	Katay Cycling Team
9–13 July	Troféu Joaquim Agostinho	Portugal	2.2	Dirk Müller (GER)	Team Sparkasse
12 July	Cronoscalata Gardone V.T. – Prati di Caregno	Italy	1.2	Robert Vrečer (SLO)	Radenska–KD Financial Point
13 July	Giro del Medio Brenta	Italy	1.2	Robert Vrečer (SLO)	Radenska–KD Financial Point
13 July	Pomorski Klasyk	Poland	1.2	Dariusz Baranowski (POL)	DHL–Author
18–20 July	Vuelta a la Comunidad de Madrid	Spain	2.1	Oleg Chuzhda (UKR)	Contentpolis–Murcia
19 July	Grand Prix Cristal Energie	France	1.2	Dan Craven (NAM)	Team Fidibc.com
20 July	Trofeo Matteotti	Italy	1.1	Paolo Bettini (ITA)	Quick-Step
20 July	Giro del Casentino	Italy	1.2	Simone Ponzi (ITA)	
23–27 July	Sachsen-Tour International	Germany	2.1	Bert Grabsch (GER)	Team Columbia
24–27 July	Brixia Tour	Italy	2.1	Santo Anzà (ITA)	Diquigiovanni–Androni
25 July	Prueba Villafranca de Ordizia	Spain	1.1	Vladimir Karpets (RUS)	Caisse d'Epargne
26 July	Grand Prix Bradlo	Slovakia	1.2	Péter Kusztor (HUN)	P-Nívó Betonexpressz 2000 Corratec
26–28 July	Kreiz Breizh Elites	France	2.2	Blel Kadri (FRA)	Albi Vélo Sport
26–30 July	Tour de Wallonie	Belgium	2.HC	Sergei Ivanov (RUS)	Astana
27 July	GP de Pérenchies	France	1.2	Steven De Neef (BEL)	Davitamon–Lotto–Jong Vlaanderen
27 July	Gran Premio Inda	Italy	1.2	Jarosław Marycz (POL)	Team FidiBC.com
29 July–2 August	Dookoła Mazowsza	Poland	2.2	Tomasz Kiendy (POL)	CCC–Polsat–Polkowice
30 July–3 August	Tour Alsace	France	2.2	Robert Bengsch (GER)	Germany (national team)
30 July–3 August	Tour of Denmark	Denmark	2.HC	Jakob Fuglsang (DEN)	CSC–Saxo Bank
31 July	Circuito de Getxo	Spain	1.1	Reinier Honig (NED)	P3 Transfer–Batavus
1 August	Gran Premio Industria e Commercio Artigianato Carnaghese	Italy	1.1	Francesco Ginanni (ITA)	Diquigiovanni–Androni
1 August	GP Betonexpressz 2000	Hungary	1.2	Péter Kusztor (HUN)	P-Nívó Betonexpressz 2000 Corratec
2 August	Gran Premio Nobili Rubinetterie	Italy	1.1	Giampaolo Cheula (ITA)	Barloworld
2 August	Grand Prix P-Nívó	Hungary	1.2	Gergely Ivanics (HUN)	P-Nívó Betonexpressz 2000 Corratec
2 August	Scandinavian Open Road Race	Sweden	1.2	Aleksejs Saramotins (LAT)	Rietumu Banka–Riga
3 August	Giro dell'Appennino	Italy	1.1	Alessandro Bertolini (ITA)	Diquigiovanni–Androni
3 August	Polynormande	France	1.1	Arnaud Gérard (FRA)	Française des Jeux
3 August	Subida a Urkiola	Spain	1.1	David Arroyo (ESP)	Caisse d'Epargne
3 August	Sparkassen Giro Bochum	Germany	1.1	Eric Baumann (GER)	Team Sparkasse
3 August	Giro Ciclistico del Cigno	Italy	1.2	Federico Vitali (ITA)	Cyber Team Oleodin Panni
5 August	GP Folignano	Italy	1.2	Alessandro De Marchi (ITA)	Team Brisot Cardin Bibanese
5–9 August	Vuelta Ciclista a León	Spain	2.2	Alberto Contador (ESP)	Astana
5–9 August	Tour des Pyrénées	France	2.2	Daniel Fleeman (GBR)	An Post–M Donnelly–Grant Thornton–Sean Kelly Team
6–7 August	Paris–Corrèze	France	2.1	Miyataka Shimizu (JPN)	Meitan Hompo-GDR
7 August	Gran Premio Città di Camaiore	Italy	1.1	Leonardo Bertagnolli (ITA)	Liquigas
7–9 August	Tour of Małopolska	Poland	2.2	Marcin Sapa (POL)	DHL–Author
7–10 August	Tour of Szeklerland	Romania	2.2	Martin Hebík (CZE)	AC Sparta Prague
8–12 August	Vuelta a Burgos	Spain	2.HC	Xabier Zandio (ESP)	Caisse d'Epargne
10 August	Fyen Rundt	Denmark	1.2	Lars Ulrich Sørensen (DEN)	Energy Fyn
10 August	Trofeo Internazionale Bastianelli	Italy	1.2	Peter Kennaugh (UK)	Great Britain (national team)
10–13 August	Tour de l'Ain	France	2.1	Linus Gerdemann (GER)	Team Columbia
11 August	GP Città di Felino	Italy	1.2	Egor Silin (RUS)	Russia (national team)
13–24 August	Volta a Portugal em Bicicleta – EDP	Portugal	2.HC	David Blanco (ESP)	Palmeiras Resort–Tavira
14 August	Puchar Ministra Obrony Narodowej	Poland	1.2	Bartłomiej Matysiak (POL)	Legia
16 August	GP Capodarco	Italy	1.2	Peter Kennaugh (UK)	Great Britain (national team)
17 August	Vlaamse Havenpijl	Belgium	1.2	Jonas Aaen Jørgensen (DEN)	Team GLS
17 August	Gara Ciclistica Montappone	Italy	1.2	Anton Sintsov (RUS)	Centri della Calzatura–Partizan
17 August	Puchar Uzdrowisk Karpackich	Poland	1.2	Mariusz Witecki (POL)	Mróz–Action–UNIQA
18 August	Gran Premio Industria, Commercio e Artigianato di Castelfidardo	Italy	1.2	Alexey Tsatevitch (RUS)	Russia (national team)
19 August	Grote Prijs Stad Zottegem	Belgium	1.1	Roy Sentjens (BEL)	Silence–Lotto
19 August	Trofeo Città di Castelfidardo	Italy	1.2	Adriano Malori (ITA)	Filmop Sorelle Ramonda Bottoli
19 August	Grand Prix des Marbriers	France	1.2	Ben Hermans (BEL)	Davo
19 August	Tre Valli Varesine	Italy	1.HC	Francesco Ginanni (ITA)	Diquigiovanni–Androni
19–22 August	Tour du Limousin	France	2.1	Sébastien Hinault (FRA)	Crédit Agricole
20 August	Coppa Ugo Agostoni	Italy	1.1	Linus Gerdemann (GER)	Team Columbia
20–24 August	Grand Prix Tell	Switzerland	2.Ncup	Steve Cummings (UK)	Team Katusha
21 August	Coppa Bernocchi	Italy	1.1	Tomasz Kiendyś (POL)	Barloworld
22–24 August	Szlakiem Walk Majora Hubala	Poland	2.2	Timofey Kritskiy (RUS)	CCC Polsat–Polkowice
23 August	Trofeo Melinda	Italy	1.1	Leonardo Bertagnolli (ITA)	Liquigas
24 August	Clásica Ciclista los Puertos	Spain	1.1	Levi Leipheimer (USA)	Astana
26–31 August	Giro della Valle d'Aosta	Italy	2.2	Michele Gaia (ITA)	U.C. Bergamasca 1902–Colpack–De Nardi
27 August	Druivenkoers Overijse	Belgium	1.1	Domenik Klemme (GER)	3C Gruppe
27–31 August	Tour of Ireland	Ireland	2.1	Marco Pinotti (ITA)	Team Columbia
31 August	Giro del Veneto	Italy	1.HC	Francesco Ginanni (ITA)	Diquigiovanni–Androni
31 August	Châteauroux Classic	France	1.1	Anthony Ravard (FRA)	Agritubel
31 August	Tour de Rijke	Netherlands	1.1	Steven de Jongh (NED)	Quick-Step
2 September	Coupe Sels	Belgium	1.1	Elia Rigotto (ITA)	Milram
3 September	Memorial Rik Van Steenbergen	Belgium	1.1	Gert Steegmans (BEL)	Quick-Step
3–7 September	Tour de Slovaquie	Slovakia	2.2	Kristoffer Nielsen (DEN)	Team GLS
5–14 September	Tour de l'Avenir	France	2.Ncup	Jan Bakelants (BEL)	Belgium
6 September	Coppa Placci	Italy	1.HC	Luca Paolini (ITA)	Acqua & Sapone–Caffè Mokambo
7 September	Grote Prijs Jef Scherens	Belgium	1.1	Wouter Mol (NED)	P3 Transfer–Batavus
7 September	Giro della Romagna	Italy	1.1	Enrico Gasparotto (ITA)	Barloworld
7 September	Trofeo Salvatore Morucci	Italy	1.2	Fabio Taborre (ITA)	Aran Bls Cantina Tollo
7 September	Memorial Davide Fardelli	Italy	1.2	Marcel Kittel (GER)	Thüringer Energie Team
7 September	GP Ljubljana–Zagreb	Slovenia	1.2	Robert Vrečer (SLO)	Radenska–KD Financial Point
7–14 September	Tour of Britain	United Kingdom	2.1	Geoffroy Lequatre (FRA)	Agritubel
7–14 September	Tour of Bulgaria	Bulgaria	2.2	Ivaïlo Gabrovski (BUL)	CC Nessebar
10–14 September	Tour de Sochi	Russia	2.2	Vladimir Gusev (RUS)	Russia (national team)
13 September	Paris–Brussels	Belgium	1.HC	Robbie McEwen (AUS)	Silence–Lotto
14 September	Rund um die Nürnberger Altstadt	Germany	1.1	André Greipel (GER)	Team Columbia
14 September	Chrono Champenois Masculin	France	1.2	Adriano Malori (ITA)	Filmop Sorelle Ramonda Bottoli
14 September	Grand Prix de Fourmies	France	1.HC	Giovanni Visconti (ITA)	Quick-Step
17 September	Grand Prix de Wallonie	Belgium	1.1	Stefano Garzelli (ITA)	Acqua & Sapone–Caffè Mokambo
18 September	Kroz Vojvodina I	Serbia	1.2	Robert Vrečer (SLO)	Radenska–KD Financial Point
19 September	Kampioenschap van Vlaanderen	Belgium	1.1	André Greipel (GER)	Team Columbia
19 September	Grand Prix de la Somme	France	1.1	William Bonnet (FRA)	Crédit Agricole
20 September	Memorial Viviana Manservisi	Italy	1.1	Alessandro Petacchi (ITA)	LPR Brakes–Ballan
20 September	Kroz Vojvodina II	Serbia	1.2	Gregor Gazvoda (SLO)	Perutnina Ptuj
21 September	Grand Prix d'Isbergues	France	1.1	William Bonnet (FRA)	Crédit Agricole
21 September	Gran Premio Industria e Commercio di Prato	Italy	1.1	Mikhaylo Khalilov (UKR)	Ceramica Flaminia–Bossini Docce
21 September	Duo Normand	France	1.2	Martin Mortensen (Denmark) Michael Tronborg (DEN)	Designa Køkken
21 September	Trofeo G. Bianchin	Italy	1.2	Robert Vrečer (SLO)	Radenska–KD Financial Point
21 September	Giro del Canavese	Italy	1.2U	Simone Ponzi (ITA)	Zalf Désirée Fior
24 September	Omloop van het Houtland	Belgium	1.1	Martin Pedersen (DEN)	Team GLS–Pakke Shop
24–27 September	Tour du Poitou Charentes et de la Vienne	France	2.1	Benoît Vaugrenard (FRA)	Française des Jeux
30 September	Omloop van de Vlaamse Scheldeboorden	Belgium	1.1	Wouter Weylandt (BEL)	Quick-Step
30 September	Ruota d'Oro	Italy	1.2	Ben Gastauer (LUX)	Team Fidibc.com
2–5 October	Circuit Franco-Belge	Belgium	2.1	Juan Antonio Flecha (ESP)	Rabobank
3 October	Sparkassen Münsterland Giro	Germany	1.1	André Greipel (GER)	Team Columbia
3–5 October	Cinturó de l'Empordà	Spain	2.2	Luca Zanasca (ITA)	Centri della Calzatura–Partizan
4 October	Memorial Cimurri	Italy	1.1	Mikhaylo Khalilov (UKR)	Ceramica Flaminia–Bossini Docce
4 October	Piccolo Giro di Lombardia	Italy	1.2	Daniele Ratto (ITA)	UC Bergamasco–De Nardi–Colpack
5 October	Giro del Lazio	Italy	1.HC	Francesco Masciarelli (ITA)	Acqua & Sapone–Caffè Mokambo
5 October	Tour de Vendée	France	1.1	Koldo Fernández (ESP)	Euskaltel–Euskadi
9 October	Paris–Bourges	France	1.1	Bernhard Eisel (AUT)	Team Columbia
9 October	Coppa Sabatini	Italy	1.1	Mikhaylo Khalilov (UKR)	Ceramica Flaminia–Bossini Docce
11 October	Giro dell'Emilia	Italy	1.HC	Danilo Di Luca (ITA)	LPR Brakes–Ballan
12 October	G.P. Beghelli	Italy	1.1	Alessandro Petacchi (ITA)	LPR Brakes–Ballan
12 October	Paris–Tours Espoirs	France	1.2U	Tony Gallopin (FRA)	Auber 93
14 October	Nationale Sluitingprijs	Belgium	1.1	Hans Dekkers (NED)	Mitsubishi–Jartazi
16 October	Giro del Piemonte	Italy	1.HC	Daniele Bennati (ITA)	Liquigas

== Final ranking ==
There is a competition for the rider, team and country with the most points gained from winning or achieving a high place in the above races.

=== Individual classification ===
Rank	Name	Points
1	Enrico Gasparotto (ITA)	644
2	Stefano Garzelli (ITA)	588.2
3	Mikhaylo Khalilov (UKR)	488
4	Luca Paolini (ITA)	476.2
5	Danilo Di Luca (ITA)	454.2
6	Stefan van Dijk (NED)	448
7	Héctor Guerra (ESP)	421
8	Francesco Ginanni (ITA)	407.4
9	Eddy Ratti (ITA)	336
10	Bobbie Traksel (NED)	335

=== Team classification ===
Rank	Team	Points
1	Acqua & Sapone–Caffè Mokambo	1875
2	Barloworld	1749
3	LPR Brakes–Ballan	1672.6
4	Agritubel	1640
5	Perutnina Ptuj	1313
6	Mitsubishi–Jartazi	1271
7	Ceramica Flaminia–Bossini Docce	1204
8	Diquigiovanni–Androni	1137.6
9	Rabobank Continental Team	1105.92
10	Liberty Seguros Continental	102

=== Nation classification ===
Rank	Nation	Points
1	Italy	3842.4
2	Spain	2423.66
3	Netherlands	2316.86
4	Slovenia	2122
5	France	2091.2
6	Germany	1844.8
7	Poland	1844.32
8	Belgium	1804.2
9	Russia	1723
10	Ukraine	1496

=== Nation under-23 classification ===
Rank	Nation under-23	Points
1	Italy	1084
2	France	984.2
3	Russia	948
4	Belgium	922.52
5	Germany	849.66
6	Netherlands	742.2
7	Great Britain	444
8	Denmark	380
9	Slovenia	321
10	Ukraine	315
