= 2009 Danmark Rundt =

2008–09 UCI Europe Tour

Race details
- Dates: 29 July – 2 August 2009
- Stages: 6
- Distance: 830.5 km (516.0 mi)
- Winning time: 19h 42' 03"

Results
Jersey awarded to the overall winner	Winner	Jakob Fuglsang (Denmark)	(Team Saxo Bank)
	Second	Maurizio Biondo (Italy)	(Ceramica Flaminia–Bossini Docce)
	Third	Roger Hammond (Great Britain)	(Cervélo TestTeam)
Jersey awarded to the points classification winner	Points	Matti Breschel (Denmark)	(Team Saxo Bank)
Jersey awarded to the mountains classification winner	Mountains	Troels Vinther (Denmark)	(Team Capinordic)
Jersey awarded to the young rider classification winner	Young rider	Rasmus Guldhammer (Denmark)	(Team Capinordic)
	Team	(Denmark) Team Saxo Bank	

The 2009 Danmark Rundt was a men's road bicycle race held from 29 July to 2 August 2009. It was the 19th edition of the men's stage race, which was established in 1985. The race was won by Danish rider Jakob Fuglsang of Team Saxo Bank, making this his second consecutive victory in the race. Maurizio Biondo of Ceramica Flaminia finished second by just three seconds with Roger Hammond of Cervélo third.

== Schedule ==
Stage	Route	Distance	Date	Winner
1	Hirtshals > Rebild	175 km	29 July	(Denmark) Matti Breschel
2	Aars > Aarhus	190 km	30 July	(Denmark) Nicki Sørensen
3	Aarhus > Vejle	185 km	31 July	(Denmark) Jakob Fuglsang
4	Korsør > Køge	115 km	1 August	(United Kingdom) Jeremy Hunt
5 (ITT)	Roskilde > Roskilde	15.5 km	1 August	(Italy) Maurizio Biondo
6	Ringsted > Frederiksberg	150 km	2 August	(Germany) Sebastian Siedler

== Teams ==
Fifteen teams took part in the 2009 race. Team Columbia–HTC was due to compete but withdrew as it was unable to field a team.

- Team Saxo Bank
- Cervélo TestTeam
- Ceramica Flaminia–Bossini Docce
- Team Capinordic
- Silence–Lotto
- Team Designa Køkken
- Blue Water–Cycling for Health
- Topsport Vlaanderen–Mercator
- Vacansoleil
- Glud & Marstrand–Horsens
- Concordia–Vesthimmerland
- Vorarlberg–Corratec
- Team Post Danmark
- ISD Sport Donetsk
- CSF Group–Navigare

== Final classifications ==
Danish rider Jakob Fuglsang won the race by three seconds from Maurizio Biondo after a solo victory in stage 3 on the Kiddersvej climb in Vejle. Although Biondo was able to contest the race on the individual time trial, Fuglsang was able to maintain his lead on the final stage. Roger Hammond was placed third.

The points winner was Matti Breschel with Troels Vinther the winner of the mountains classification for best climber. Rasmus Guldhammer won the white jersey for the best young rider award and Allan Johansen was awarded the fighters award for the race. Team Saxo Bank won the overall team competition by seven seconds from Cervélo with Team Capinordic in third place.
