= Francesco Ginanni =

Italian cyclist

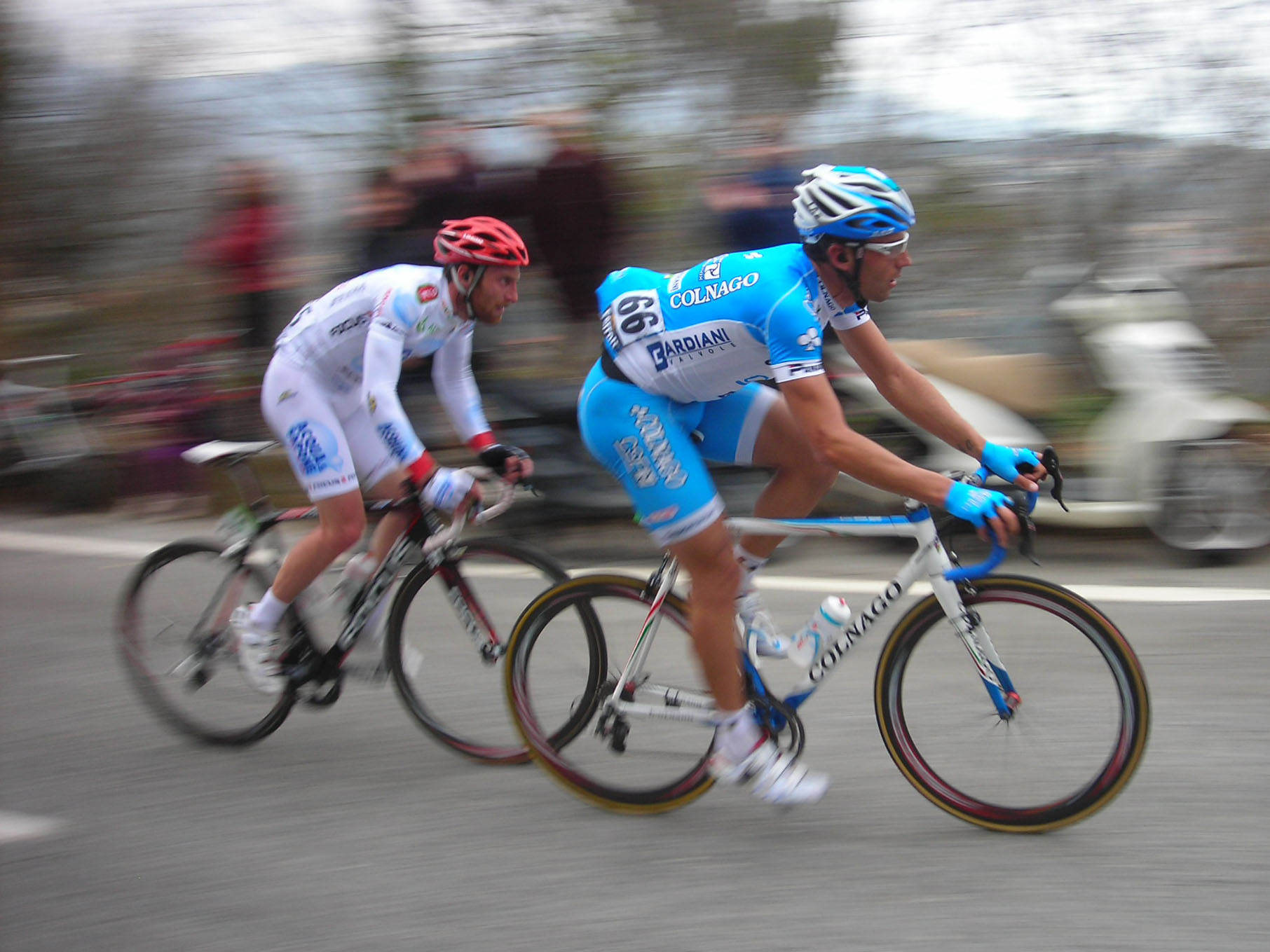
- Francesco Ginanni, on the left, in 2012

Personal information
- Full name: Francesco Ginanni
- Born: 6 October 1985 (age 41) Pistoia, Italy

Cycling career
- Sport: Cycling
- Current team: Acqua & Sapone
- Discipline: Road
- Role: Rider

Professional teams
- 2006–2007: Finauto-D'étoffe-Zoccorinese
- 2008–2011: Diquigiovanni–Androni
- 2012: Acqua & Sapone

Major wins
- Giro del Veneto (2008); Tre Valli Varesine (2008)

Francesco Ginanni (born 6 October 1985 in Pistoia) is an Italian professional road bicycle racer for UCI Professional Continental team Acqua & Sapone, after turning professional with Diquigiovanni–Androni in 2008. As an amateur, Ginanni won five races in 2006 and four races in 2007, including the Giro del Casentino, a 1.2 rated single-day race on the UCI Europe Tour. Ginanni's first professional victory came in the Gran Premio Industria e Commercio Artigianato Carnaghese in August 2008, which he followed up by winning the Tre Valli Varesine and Giro del Veneto, both races classified as 1.HC – the highest rating for single-day races on the UCI Europe Tour. The Daily Peloton called 2008 "a real breakthrough year" for Ginanni. Ginanni won a further three single-day races in 2009 and, as of March 2010, one in 2010. Ginanni won the Trofeo Laigueglia in both 2009 and 2010, emulating Eddy Merckx and Filippo Pozzato. Ginanni aimed to win Milan–San Remo, one of the five monuments of road bicycle racing. In the 2010 edition, he had finished 7th. He retired from professional racing in October 2012 without a victory or a podium finish at Milan–San Remo.

== Palmarès ==
Date	Placing	Race	Location	Competition, Rating
25 March 2006	1st	Milano–Busseto	Italy	NE
20 May 2006	1st	Città di Empoli	Italy, Empoli	NE
5 September 2006	1st	Giro Internazionale del Valdarno	Italy	NE
7 September 2006	1st	Giro della Toscana U23, Stage 1	Italy, Serravalle Pistoiese	2.2
9 September 2006	1st	Giro della Toscana U23, Stage 3	Italy, S. Miniato Basso	2.2
30 March 2007	1st	GP du Portugal, Stage 1	Portugal Felgueiras	2.Ncup
3 April 2007	1st	Mercatale Valdarno	Italy	NE
22 July 2007	1st	Giro del Casentino	Italy	1.2
15 August 2007	1st	Firenze–Viareggio	Italy	NE
13 April 2008	2nd	Presidential Cycling Tour of Turkey, Prologue	Turkey, Istanbul	UCI Europe Tour, 2.1
15 April 2008	3rd	Presidential Cycling Tour of Turkey, Stage 2	Turkey, Bodrum	UCI Europe Tour, 2.1
3 May 2008	2nd	GP Industria & Artigianato di Larciano	Italy, Larciano	UCI Europe Tour, 1.1
1 August 2008	1st	Gran Premio Industria e Commercio Artigianato Carnaghese	Italy, Carnago	UCI Europe Tour, 1.1
19 August 2008	1st	Tre Valli Varesine	Italy, Varese	UCI Europe Tour, 1.HC
31 August 2008	1st	Giro del Veneto	Italy, Padova	UCI Europe Tour, 1.HC
21 February 2009	1st	Trofeo Laigueglia	Italy, Laigueglia	UCI Europe Tour, 1.1
28 February 2009	1st	Gran Premio dell'Insubria-Lugano	Switzerland, Lugano	UCI Europe Tour, 1.1
6 August 2009	1st	Gran Premio Industria e Commercio Artigianato Carnaghese	Italy, Carnago	UCI Europe Tour, 1.1
20 February 2010	1st	Trofeo Laigueglia	Italy, Laigueglia	UCI Europe Tour, 1.1
