= Ilya Gorodnichev =

Russian bicycle racer

Personal information
- Full name: Ilya Gorodnichev
- Born: 9 March 1987 (age 39) Moscow, Russia

Cycling career
- Sport: Cycling
- Current team: Retired
- Discipline: Road
- Role: Rider

Professional teams
- 2006: Premier
- 2013: Ceramica Flaminia–Fondriest
- 2015: RTS–Santic Racing Team

Ilya Gorodnichev (born 9 March 1987 in Moscow) is a Russian former professional cyclist.

== Major results ==
2009
2nd Gran Premio Inda
2nd Trofeo Internazionale Bastianelli
3rd Gara Ciclistica Montappone
9th Ruota d'Oro
2010
1st Gara Ciclistica Montappone
5th Trofeo Alcide Degasperi
7th GP Capodarco
10th Coppa della Pace
2011
1st Coppa Bologna
4th Trofeo Alcide Degasperi
9th Overall Giro del Friuli-Venezia Giulia
2012
1st Gran Premio San Giuseppe
10th Overall Giro del Friuli-Venezia Giulia
2014
6th Overall Tour of Kavkaz
2015
2nd Overall Tour de Kumano
