= 2006 Tour of Britain =

Cycling competition

The 2006 Tour of Britain took place at various locations across Great Britain, lasting from the 29th of August to the 3rd of September. A UCI Category 2.1 event, the tour consisted of six stages covering a total distance of 870.5 km (540.9 mi), starting in Glasgow and finishing at The Mall in London.

== Stages ==
=== Stage 1 ===
29 August: Glasgow to Castle Douglas, 162.6 km (101.0 mi)

The stage was dominated by an early breakaway of three riders, who were never caught and finished 2 1/2 minutes ahead of the peloton.

	Cyclist	Nationality	Team	Time
1	Martin Pedersen	Denmark	Team CSC	4h 03'38"
2	Luis Pasamontes	Spain	Unibet.com	s.t"
3	Matthew Goss	Australia	Southaustralia.com–AIS	s.t"

=== Stage 2 ===
30 August: Blackpool to Liverpool, 163 km (101 mi)

The stage concluded in a mass sprint. Throughout the race, Goss secured enough time bonuses in the sprints to take the overall lead from Pedersen.

	Cyclist	Nationality	Team	Time
1	Roger Hammond	United Kingdom	Team Great Britain	3h 54'15"
2	Aart Vierhouten	Netherlands	Skil–Shimano	s.t"
3	Russell Downing	United Kingdom	DFL-Cycling News-Litespeed	s.t"

=== Stage 3 ===
31 August: Bradford to Sheffield, 180 km (110 mi)

The stage was dominated by a crosswind. Pedersen's teammates split the peloton to help him regain the lead, but were unable to catch Filippo Pozzato, who had escaped from the lead group near the finish.

	Cyclist	Nationality	Team	Time
1	Filippo Pozzato	Italy	Quick-Step–Innergetic	4h 28'18"
2	Michael Rogers	Australia	T-Mobile Team	32"
3	Nick Nuyens	Belgium	Quick-Step–Innergetic	32"

=== Stage 4 ===
1 September: Wolverhampton to Birmingham, 130.3 km (81.0 mi)

In another stage, a group broke away early, and the peloton was unable to catch them again. Manning was leading as the race reached the final roundabout but he was directed the wrong way and lost the stage.

	Cyclist	Nationality	Team	Time
1	Frederik Willems	Belgium	Chocolade Jacques–Topsport Vlaanderen	2h 54'12"
2	Mark Cavendish	United Kingdom	T-Mobile Team	2"
3	Paul Manning	United Kingdom	Landbouwkrediet–Colnago	6"

=== Stage 5 ===
2 September: Rochester to Canterbury, 152.6 km (94.8 mi)

The riders went on strike, after being misled by race officials, with their main complaint being poor security. They eventually resumed the race, and the stage concluded with a mass sprint.

	Cyclist	Nationality	Team	Time
1	Francesco Chicchi	Italy	Quick-Step–Innergetic	4h 24'42"
2	Mark Cavendish	United Kingdom	T-Mobile Team	s.t"
3	Aart Vierhouten	Netherlands	Skil–Shimano	s.t"

=== Stage 6 ===
3 September: Greenwich to The Mall, 82 km (51 mi) (38 km (24 mi), plus 20 laps of 2.2 km (1.4 mi))

There was a number of breakaways on the final stage, but all were eliminated, and the stage concluded with a mass sprint.

	Cyclist	Nationality	Team	Time
1	Tom Boonen	Belgium	Quick-Step–Innergetic	2h 00'41"
2	Roger Hammond	United Kingdom	Team Great Britain	s.t"
3	Mark Cavendish	United Kingdom	T-Mobile Team	s.t"

== Final classifications ==
=== General classification ===
	Name	Nationality	Team	Time
1	Martin Pedersen	Denmark	Team CSC	21h 51'24"
2	Luis Pasamontes	Spain	Unibet.com	+ 51"
3	Filippo Pozzato	Italy	Quick-Step–Innergetic	+ 2'11"
4	Nick Nuyens	Belgium	Quick-Step–Innergetic	+ 2'46"
5	Michael Rogers	Australia	T-Mobile Team	+ s.t.
6	Iljo Keisse	Belgium	Chocolade Jacques–Topsport Vlaanderen	+ 3'06"
7	Johann Tschopp	Switzerland	Phonak iShares	+ 3'07"
8	Andy Schleck	Luxembourg	Team CSC	+ 3'14"
9	Russell Downing	United Kingdom	DFL-Cycling News-Litespeed	+ 3'16"
10	Maarten Tjallingii	Netherlands	Skil–Shimano	+ 3'18"
