= Luca Pierfelici =

Personal information
- Born: 3 September 1983 (age 43) Urbino, Italy

Cycling career
- Sport: Cycling
- Current team: Retired
- Discipline: Road
- Role: Rider

Amateur teams
- 2002: Reda–Godo
- 2003: Reda Impresa Edile Mulinari
- 2004: Domina Vacanze–Pedale Fermano
- 2005: Naturino–Sapore di Mare–Pedale Fermano

Professional teams
- 2005: Naturino–Sapore di Mare (stagiaire)
- 2006–2007: Naturino–Sapore di Mare
- 2008–2010: Acqua & Sapone–Caffè Mokambo

Luca Pierfelici (born 3 September 1983) is an Italian former professional road cyclist.

== Major results ==
2004
6th Trofeo Internazionale Bastianelli
2005
2nd Gara Ciclistica Montappone
9th GP Capodarco
2007
3rd Overall Settimana Internazionale di Coppi e Bartali
4th Overall Settimana Ciclista Lombarda
9th Memorial Marco Pantani
2008
3rd Overall Route du Sud
6th Overall Brixia Tour
8th Overall Euskal Bizikleta
