= Gran Premio dell'Insubria-Lugano =

Race details
- Date: Late February
- Region: Insubria, Switzerland
- Local name: Gran Premio dell'Insubria-Lugano
- Discipline: Road
- Competition: UCI Europe Tour 1.1
- Type: Single Day Race

History
- First edition: 2009
- Editions: 3
- Final edition: 2011
- First winner: Francesco Ginanni (ITA)
- Most wins: No repeat winners
- Final winner: Giovanni Visconti (ITA)

Gran Premio dell'Insubria-Lugano was a single day race in the historic region of Insubria, Switzerland. The race was established in 2009 as a 1.1 event on the UCI Europe Tour. The race replaced the former Gran Premio di Chiasso, but was not held after 2011.

== Past winners ==
Year	Country	Rider	Team
2009	Italy	Francesco Ginanni	Diquigiovanni–Androni
2010	France	Samuel Dumoulin	Cofidis
2011	Italy	Giovanni Visconti	Farnese Vini–Neri Sottoli
