= Gran Premio San Giuseppe =

Race details
- Date: March
- Region: Marche
- Discipline: Road race
- Competition: UCI Europe Tour
- Type: Single day race
- Organiser: ASD Velo Club Montecassiano

History
- First edition: 1985
- Editions: 32 (as of 2015)
- First winner: Marcello Bartalini (ITA)
- Most wins: Enrico Battaglin (ITA) (2 wins)
- Most recent: Nicola Bagioli (ITA)

The Gran Premio San Giuseppe is a one-day cycling race held annually in Italy. It was part of UCI Europe Tour in category 1.2 from 2005 to 2013, when it was reserved for amateurs in 2014.

== Winners ==
Year	Country	Rider	Team
2005	Denmark	Martin Pedersen	Team GLS
2006	Italy	Antonio Bucciero	
2007	Russia	Andrey Solomennikov	
2008	Poland	Damian Walczak	MGK Vis Norda
2009	Italy	Alessandro Malaguti	
2010	Italy	Enrico Battaglin	Zalf Désirée Fior
2011	Italy	Enrico Battaglin	Zalf Désirée Fior
2012	Russia	Ilya Gorodnichev	Simaf Carrier Wega Truck Italia Valdarno
2013	Italy	Luca Chirico	U.C. Trevigiani–Dynamon–Bottoli
2014	Italy	Nicola Gaffurini	Vega-Hotsand
2015	Italy	Gianni Moscon	Zalf Euromobil Désirée Fior
2016	Italy	Nicola Bagioli	Zalf Euromobil Désirée Fior
