= Eddy Ratti =

Italian cyclist

Personal information
- Born: 4 April 1977 (age 49) Codogno, Italy

Cycling career
- Sport: Cycling
- Current team: Retired
- Discipline: Road
- Role: Rider

Professional teams
- 2000–2002: Mapei–Quick Step
- 2003: Lampre
- 2004: Flanders-Afin.com
- 2005: Nippo
- 2006–2007: Naturino–Sapore di Mare
- 2008–2009: Nippo–Endeka
- 2010: De Rosa–Stac Plastic

Eddy Ratti (born 4 April 1977 in Codogno) is an Italian former cyclist.

== Palmares ==
1999
1st Coppa Colli Briantei Internazionale
1st Freccia dei Vini
2nd Gran Premio Industrie del Marmo
2000
3rd Giro d'Oro
2002
1st Stage 2b Regio-Tour
1st Tre Valli Varesine
2003
3rd Giro della Romagna
2004
2nd Giro d'Oro
2005
1st Overall Tour de Hokkaido

1st Stages 1 & 4

2006
1st Stage 5 Settimana Ciclistica Lombarda
2nd Circuit de Lorraine
3rd Giro del Trentino
3rd Giro dell'Appennino
2008
1st Overall Istrian Spring Trophy

1st Stage 2

1st GP Industria & Artigianato di Larciano
2nd Giro dell'Appennino
3rd Overall Brixia Tour

1st Stage 2
