= Daniele Callegarin =

Italian cyclist (born 1982)

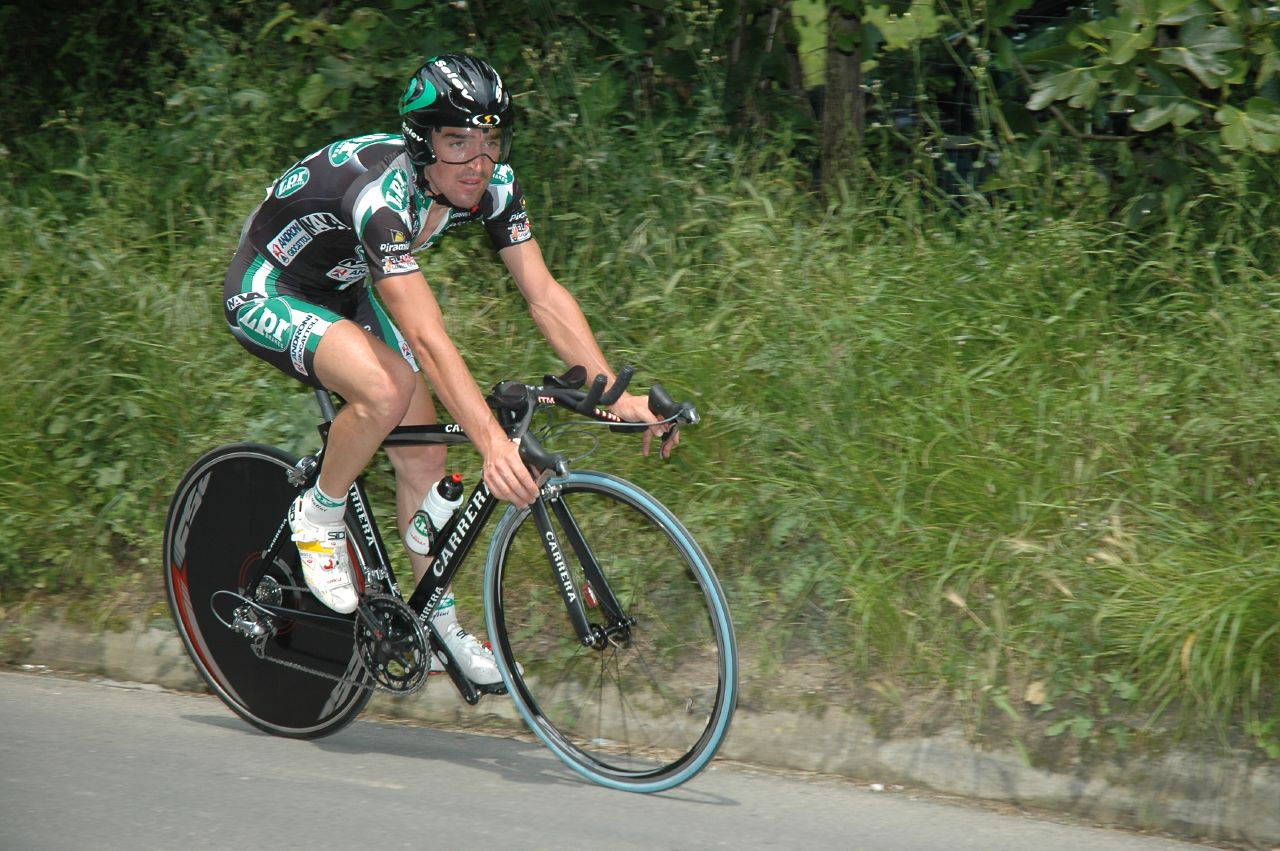

Personal information
- Born: 21 September 1982 (age 44) Cuggiono, Italy

Cycling career
- Sport: Cycling
- Discipline: Road
- Role: Rider

Professional teams
- 2006: Team 3C Casalinghi Jet Androni Giocattoli
- 2007: Team LPR
- 2008–2010: Centri della Calzatura
- 2011–2012: Team Type 1-Sanofi

Daniele Callegarin (born 21 September 1982 in Cuggiono) is an Italian former cyclist.

== Palmares ==
2008
2nd Banja Luka-Belgrade I
3rd Banja Luka-Belgrade II
2009
1st GP Industria & Artigianato di Larciano
2nd Giro del Mendrisiotto
2nd Gran Premio Industria e Commercio Artigianato Carnaghese
3rd Overall Szlakiem Grodów Piastowskich

1st Stage 1
