= Martin Pedersen (cyclist) =

Danish cyclist

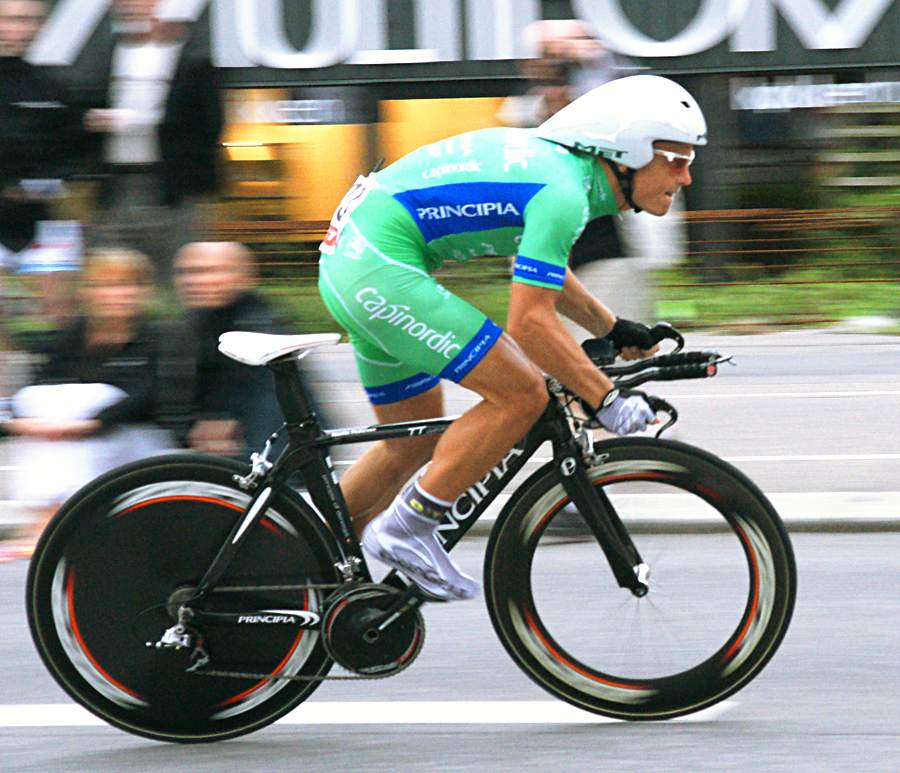

Personal information
- Full name: Martin Pedersen
- Born: 15 April 1983 (age 43) Brøndby, Denmark
- Height: 1.70 m (5 ft 7 in)
- Weight: 66 kg (146 lb; 10.4 st)

Cycling career
- Sport: Cycling
- Discipline: Road
- Role: Rider

Amateur team
- 2004: Team PH

Professional teams
- 2005: Team GLS
- 2006–2007: Team CSC
- 2008–2009: Team GLS–Pakke Shop
- 2010: Footon–Servetto–Fuji
- 2011: Leopard Trek
- 2012–2013: Christina Watches–Onfone

Major wins
- Tour of Britain (2006)

Martin Pedersen (born 15 April 1983) is a Danish former professional road bicycle racer. He rode with Team PH in 2004, and after a great 2005 season with many wins for the small, talent producing Team GLS, he signed his first professional contract with Team CSC for the 2006 and 2007 seasons. He retired after the 2013 season.

== Major results ==
2003
1st Madison, National Track Championships
2002
1st Road race, National Under-23 Road Championships
2004
1st Road race, National Under-23 Road Championships
4th Giro del Canavese
2005
1st Liège–Bastogne–Liège U23
Olympia's Tour

1st Points classification
1st Stages 2 & 3

1st Stage 2 Giro della Toscana
1st Stage 1, 2 & 4 Ringerike GP
1st GP San Giuseppe
2006
1st Overall Tour of Britain

1st Stage 1

2007
1st Mountains classification, Eneco Tour
5th Sparkassen Giro Bochum
9th Reading Classic
2008
1st Omloop van het Houtland
1st Stage 4b Okolo Slovenska
1st Stage 2 Circuit des Ardennes International
2nd Overall Kreiz Breizh Elites

1st Stage 1

2nd GP Nordjylland
7th Grand Prix Cristal Energie
10th Overall Ringerike GP
2009
1st Rund um Köln
1st Grand Prix de la Ville de Nogent-sur-Oise
1st Grand Prix Cristal Energie
2nd GP Stad Zottegem
3rd Overall Les 3 Jours de Vaucluse

1st Stage 3

3rd Trophée des Champions
4th Route Adélie
5th Road race, National Road Championships
6th Les Boucles du Sud Ardèche
7th Overall Boucles de la Mayenne
7th Scandinavian Race Uppsala
9th Overall Ringerike GP
2012
1st Overall Tour of China I

1st Stage 1 (TTT)

9th Grand Prix of Donetsk
2013
1st Circuit d'Alger
3rd Overall Tour de Tipaza
9th Race Horizon Park II
