= Anton Sintsov =

Russian road and mountain bike racer (born 1991)

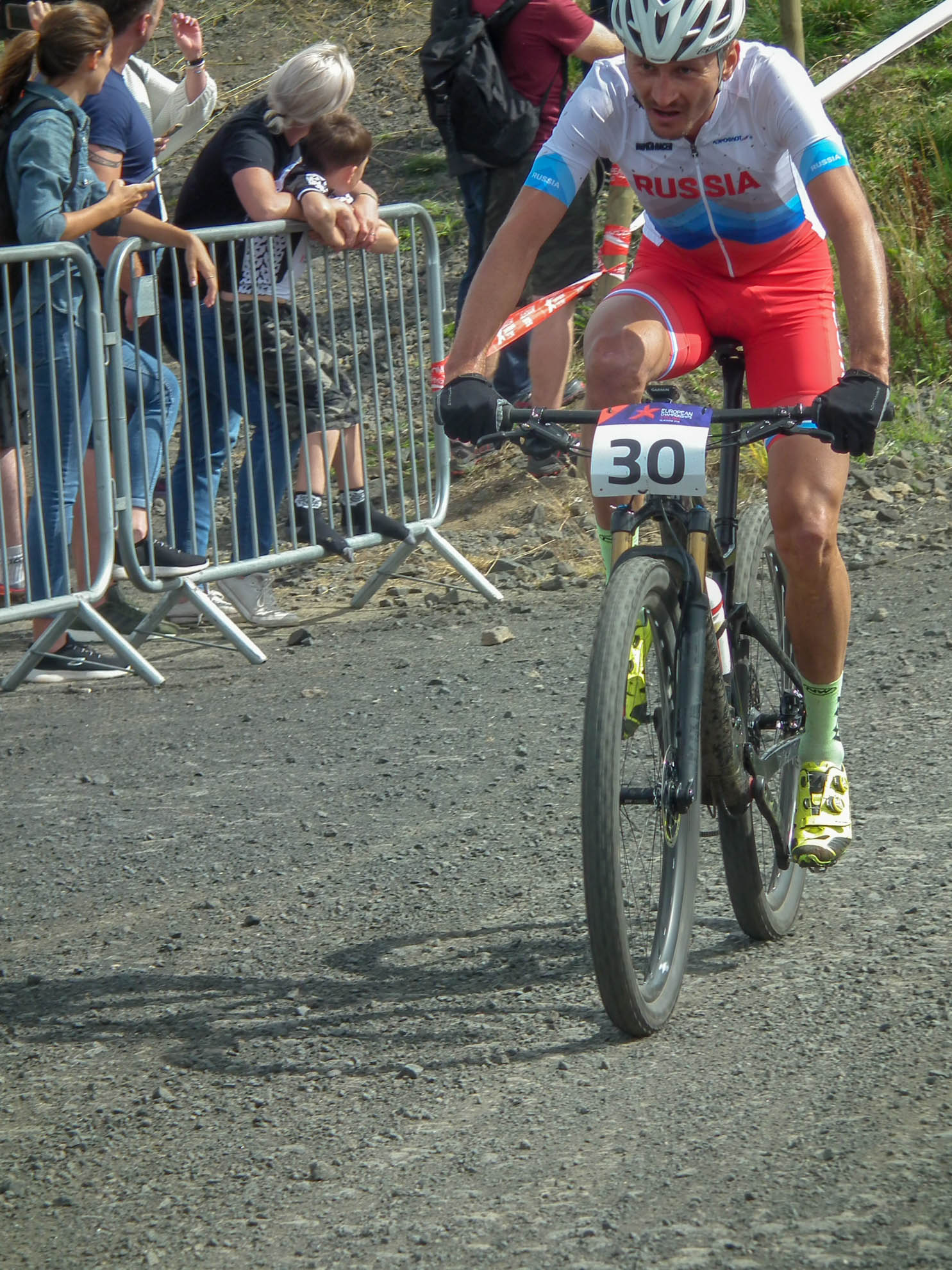

Personal information
- Full name: Anton Sergeyevich Sintsov
- Born: 29 May 1991 (age 35) Izhevsk, Russia

Cycling career
- Sport: Cycling
- Disciplines: Road; Mountain bike
- Role: Rider

Amateur teams
- 2006: Velo Club Seano One
- 2007–2009: Calzaturieri Montegranaro–Marini Silvano
- 2010–2011: Vejus–TMF–R.Novara–BH Bikes
- 2015: Bicisport Wiler Canarias CC

Professional team
- 2008: Centri della Calzatura–Partizan

Anton Sergeyevich Sintsov (Russian: Антон Сергеевич Синцов; born 3 February 1985) is a Russian road and mountain bike racer. He rode at the cross-country event at the 2016 Summer Olympics. He was on the start list for the 2018 Cross-country European Championship and he finished 7th. At the 2020 Summer Olympics in mountain bike cross-country Sintsov finished 11th, the best result of a Russian in that event.

== Major results ==
2008
1st Gara Ciclistica Milionaria
2nd Giro Ciclisto del Cigno
2010
3rd Gara Ciclistica Montappone
2014
1st Cross-country, National Mountain Bike Championships
2017
1st Cross-country, National Mountain Bike Championships
