= Loborika =

Loborika Lavarigo
- Village
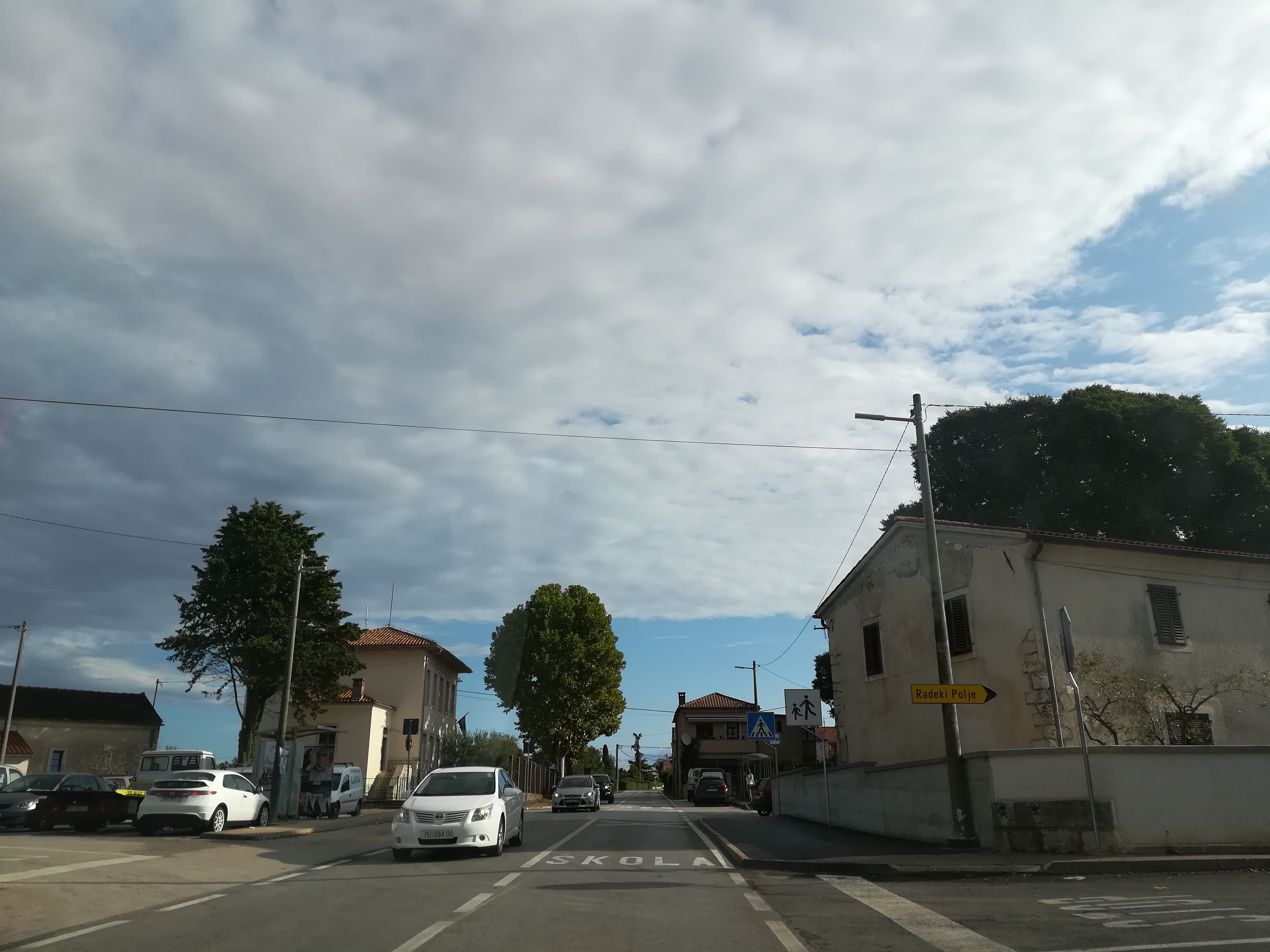

- Location within Croatia
- Coordinates: 44°54′54″N 13°54′22″E
- Country: Croatia
- County: Istria County
- Municipality: Marčana

Area
  - Total: 3.5 sq mi (9.0 km^{2})
- Elevation: 720 ft (220 m)

Population (2021)
  - Total: 978
  - Density: 280/sq mi (110/km^{2})
- Time zone: UTC+1 (CET)
  - Summer (DST): UTC+2 (CEST)
- Area code: 52

Loborika (Italian: Lavarigo) is a village in the municipality of Marčana, in Istria County, Croatia.

== Demographics ==
According to the 2021 census, its population was 978. In 2001 it had a population of 521.
