= Davide Torosantucci =

Italian cyclist

Personal information
- Born: 3 November 1981 (age 44) Lanciano, Italy

Cycling career
- Sport: Cycling
- Current team: Retired
- Discipline: Road
- Role: Rider

Professional teams
- 2005–2007: Universal Caffè
- 2008: Katay
- 2009–2011: Centri della Calzatura

Davide Torosantucci (born 3 November 1981 in Lanciano) is an Italian former cyclist.

== Palmares ==
2003
3rd GP Capodarco
3rd Gara Ciclistica Montappone
2005
1st Trofeo Internazionale Bastianelli
1st Gara Ciclistica Montappone
2008
1st Overall Grand Prix Cycliste de Gemenc

1st Prologue

2009
1st Overall Tour de Serbie
2011
1st Stage 4 Tour of South Africa
