= Maurizio Biondo =

Italian cyclist

Personal information
- Full name: Maurizio Biondo
- Born: 15 May 1981 (age 45) Concorezzo, Italy

Cycling career
- Sport: Cycling
- Current team: Retired
- Discipline: Road
- Role: Rider

Professional teams
- 2006: Team Endeka
- 2007: Kio Ene–Tonazzi–DMT
- 2008–2009: Ceramica Flaminia–Bossini Docce
- 2012: Meridiana–Kamen

Maurizio Biondo (born 15 May 1981) is an Italian former professional cyclist.

== Major results ==
2001
1st Prologue (TTT) Girobio
3rd Time trial, Mediterranean Games
2002
3rd Overall Tour de Berlin

1st Stage 3

2003
2nd Time trial, National Under-23 Road Championships
2nd Roue Tourangelle
2nd Grand Prix de Waregem
7th Overall Le Triptyque des Monts et Châteaux
7th La Côte Picarde
10th Poreč Trophy
2005
1st Trofeo Zsšdi
4th Trofeo Franco Balestra
9th Giro del Belvedere
10th Ruota d'Oro
2006
1st Trofeo Edil C
2nd Coppa della Pace
6th Overall Giro del Friuli Venezia Giulia
6th Coppa Colli Briantei Internazionale
6th GP Industrie del Marmo
8th Circuito Belvedere
2007
1st Overall Vuelta a Navarra

1st Points classification
1st Stage 1

2nd Clásica Memorial Txuma
8th Overall Flèche du Sud
8th Overall Istrian Spring Trophy
2008
1st Overall Volta ao Distrito de Santarém

1st Stage 3

3rd Time trial, National Road Championships
3rd Gran Premio Città di Camaiore
2009
1st Ronde van Drenthe
2nd Overall Danmark Rundt

1st Stage 5

3rd Time trial, National Road Championships
9th Tre Valli Varesine
10th Giro del Veneto
10th Gran Premio Industria e Commercio Artigianato Carnaghese
