= Gara Ciclistica Montappone =

Race details
- Date: August
- Region: Italy
- Discipline: Road race
- Competition: UCI Europe Tour
- Type: Single day race

History
- First edition: 1990
- Editions: 22
- Final edition: 2011
- First winner: Simone Biasci (ITA)
- Most wins: No repeat winners
- Final winner: Antonio Parrinello (ITA)

The Gara Ciclistica Montappone was a one-day road cycling race held annually in Italy. It was part of UCI Europe Tour as a category 1.2 event from 2005 to 2010.

== Winners ==
| Year | Winner | Second | Third |
|---|---|---|---|
| 1990 | (Italy) Simone Biasci | | |
| 1991 | (Italy) Stefano Arlotti | | |
| 1992 | (Italy) Alessandro Chiarini | | |
| 1993 | (Italy) Elisio Torresi | | |
| 1994 | (Italy) Marco Bellini | | |
| 1995 | (Italy) Guido Trombetta | | |
| 1996 | (Italy) Michele Colleoni | | |
| 1997 | (Australia) Cadel Evans | | |
| 1998 | (Italy) Luca De Angeli | | |
| 1999 | (Mexico) Julio Alberto Pérez Cuapio | | |
| 2000 | (Ukraine) Sergiy Matveyev | | |
| 2001 | (Ukraine) Yaroslav Popovych | | |
| 2002 | (Italy) Francesco Bellotti | (Slovenia) Kristjan Fajt | (Italy) Davide Torosantucci |
| 2003 | (Italy) Stefano Boggia | (Slovakia) Zoltán Remák | (Italy) Davide Torosantucci |
| 2004 | (Australia) Paul Crake | (Ukraine) Ruslan Pidgornyy | (Italy) Stelvio Michero |
| 2005 | (Italy) Davide Torosantucci | (Italy) Luca Pierfelici | (Colombia) Carlos Andrés Ibáñez |
| 2006 | (France) Julien Antomarchi | (Australia) Matthew Lloyd | (Russia) Anton Rechetnikov |
| 2007 | (Croatia) Tomislav Dančulović | (Russia) Egor Silin | (Italy) Francesco De Bonis |
| 2008 | (Russia) Anton Sintsov | (Russia) Egor Silin | (Slovenia) Blaž Furdi |
| 2009 | (Italy) Stefano Pirazzi | (Italy) Paolo Ciavatta | (Russia) Ilya Gorodnichev |
| 2010 | (Russia) Ilya Gorodnichev | (Kazakhstan) Alexandr Shushemoin | (Russia) Anton Sintsov |
| 2011 | (Italy) Antonio Parrinello | (Italy) Matteo Marcolin | (Italy) Davide Mucelli |
