= Antoine Dalibard =

French cyclist (born 1983)

Personal information
- Born: 10 March 1983 (age 43) Laval, France

Cycling career
- Sport: Cycling
- Current team: Retired
- Discipline: Road
- Role: Rider

Professional team
- 2005–2009: Bretagne–Jean Floc'h

Antoine Dalibard (born 10 March 1983) is a French former professional road cyclist.

Dalibard was born in Laval. His father Philippe and grandfather Joseph Groussard were also professional cyclists.

== Major results ==
2004
3rd Tour d'Eure-et-Loir
2006
5th Overall Boucles de la Mayenne
10th Overall Étoile de Bessèges
2008
1st Overall Tour de Normandie
4th Paris–Bourges
6th Overall Boucles de la Mayenne
2009
1st Overall Kreiz Breizh Elites
9th Boucles de l'Aulne
