= GP Industria & Artigianato di Larciano =

Road bicycle race held in Italy

Race details
- Date: Late April–early May (until 2014); March (until 2023); September (since 2024)
- Region: Province of Pistoia, Italy
- English name: Industry & Crafts of Larciano Grand Prix
- Local name(s): GP Industria & Artigianato di Larciano (in Italian)
- Discipline: Road
- Competition: UCI ProSeries
- Type: Single-day
- Web site: www.ciclismolarcianese.it

History
- First edition: 1967
- Editions: 57 (as of 2026)
- First winner: Giancarlo Tartoni (ITA)
- Most wins: Gianni Faresin (ITA) (3 wins)
- Most recent: Tom Pidcock (GBR)

The GP Industria & Artigianato di Larciano is a road bicycle race held annually in Larciano, Italy. After 2005, the race was organised as a 1.1 event on the UCI Europe Tour. In 2020, the race joined the UCI ProSeries. Between 1967 and 1976 it was held as the Circuito di Larciano. In 2015 the race was not held but returned in 2016.

== Past winners ==
| Year | Country | Rider | Team |
|---|---|---|---|
| 1967 | Italy | Michele Dancelli | Vittadello |
| 1968 | Italy | Vittorio Adorni | Faema |
| 1969 | Italy | Franco Bitossi | Filotex |
| 1970 | Italy | Franco Bitossi | Filotex |
| 1971 | Italy | Felice Gimondi | Salvarani |
| 1972 | No race | | |
| 1973 | Italy | Franco Bitossi | Sammontana |
| 1974 | Italy | Giacinto Santambrogio | Bianchi–Campagnolo |
| 1975 | Belgium | Roger De Vlaeminck | Brooklyn |
| 1976 | Italy | Felice Gimondi | Bianchi–Campagnolo |
| 1977 | Italy | Giancarlo Tartoni | Magniflex–Torpado |
| 1978 | Italy | Francesco Moser | Sanson |
| 1979 | Italy | Vittorio Algeri | Sapa |
| 1980 | Italy | Giuseppe Saronni | Gis Gelati |
| 1981 | Italy | Pierino Gavazzi | Magniflex |
| 1982 | Italy | Gianbattista Baronchelli | Bianchi–Piaggio |
| 1983 | Italy | Fabrizio Verza | Gis Gelati |
| 1984 | Italy | Marco Franceschini | Metauro Mobili–Pinarello |
| 1985 | Italy | Pierino Gavazzi | Atala |
| 1986 | Italy | Giovanni Bottoia | Supermercati Brianzoli |
| 1987 | Italy | Marino Amadori | Ecoflam–B.F.B. |
| 1988 | Italy | Massimo Ghirotto | Carrera Jeans–Vagabond |
| 1989 | Australia | Edward Salas | Polli-Mobiexport |
| 1990 | Soviet Union | Dimitri Konyshev | Alfa Lum |
| 1991 | Italy | Gianni Faresin | ZG Mobili |
| 1992 | Italy | Gianni Faresin | ZG Mobili–Selle Italia |
| 1993 | Italy | Marco Saligari | Ariostea |
| 1994 | Italy | Francesco Casagrande | Mercatone Uno–Medeghini |
| 1995 | Italy | Andrea Ferrigato | ZG Mobili–Selle Italia |
| 1996 | Italy | Michele Bartoli | MG Maglificio–Technogym |
| 1997 | Italy | Gianni Faresin | Mapei–GB |
| 1998 | Latvia | Romāns Vainšteins | Kross-Selle Italia |
| 1999 | Italy | Massimo Podenzana | Mercatone Uno–Bianchi |
| 2000 | Italy | Danilo Di Luca | Cantina Tollo–Regain |
| 2001 | Italy | Davide Rebellin | Liquigas–Pata |
| 2002 | Italy | Stefano Garzelli | Mapei–Quick-Step |
| 2003 | Spain | Juan Fuentes Angullo | Saeco |
| 2004 | Italy | Damiano Cunego | Saeco |
| 2005 | Italy | Luca Mazzanti | Ceramica Panaria–Navigare |
| 2006 | Italy | Damiano Cunego | Lampre–Fondital |
| 2007 | Italy | Vincenzo Nibali | Liquigas |
| 2008 | Italy | Eddy Ratti | Nippo–Endeka |
| 2009 | Italy | Daniele Callegarin | Centri della Calzatura |
| 2010 | Italy | Daniele Ratto | Carmiooro NGC |
| 2011 | Spain | Ángel Vicioso | Androni Giocattoli |
| 2012 | Italy | Filippo Pozzato | Farnese Vini–Selle Italia |
| 2013 | Italy | Mauro Santambrogio | Vini Fantini–Selle Italia |
| 2014 | Great Britain | Adam Yates | Orica–GreenEDGE |
| 2015 | No race | | |
| 2016 | Australia | Simon Clarke | Cannondale |
| 2017 | Great Britain | Adam Yates | Orica–Scott |
| 2018 | Slovenia | Matej Mohorič | Bahrain–Merida |
| 2019 | Germany | Maximilian Schachmann | Bora–Hansgrohe |
| 2020 | No race due to the COVID-19 pandemic | | |
| 2021 | Belgium | Mauri Vansevenant | Deceuninck–Quick-Step |
| 2022 | Italy | Diego Ulissi | UAE Team Emirates |
| 2023 | Ireland | Ben Healy | EF Education–EasyPost |
| 2024 | Switzerland | Marc Hirschi | UAE Team Emirates |
| 2025 | Mexico | Isaac del Toro | UAE Team Emirates XRG |
| 2026 | Great Britain | Tom Pidcock | Pinarello–Q36.5 Pro Cycling Team |

=== Wins per country ===
| Wins | Country |
|---|---|
| 41 | Italy |
| 3 | Great Britain |
| 2 | Australia; Belgium; Spain |
| 1 | Germany; Ireland; Latvia; Mexico; Slovenia; Soviet Union; Switzerland |
