= Team Capinordic =

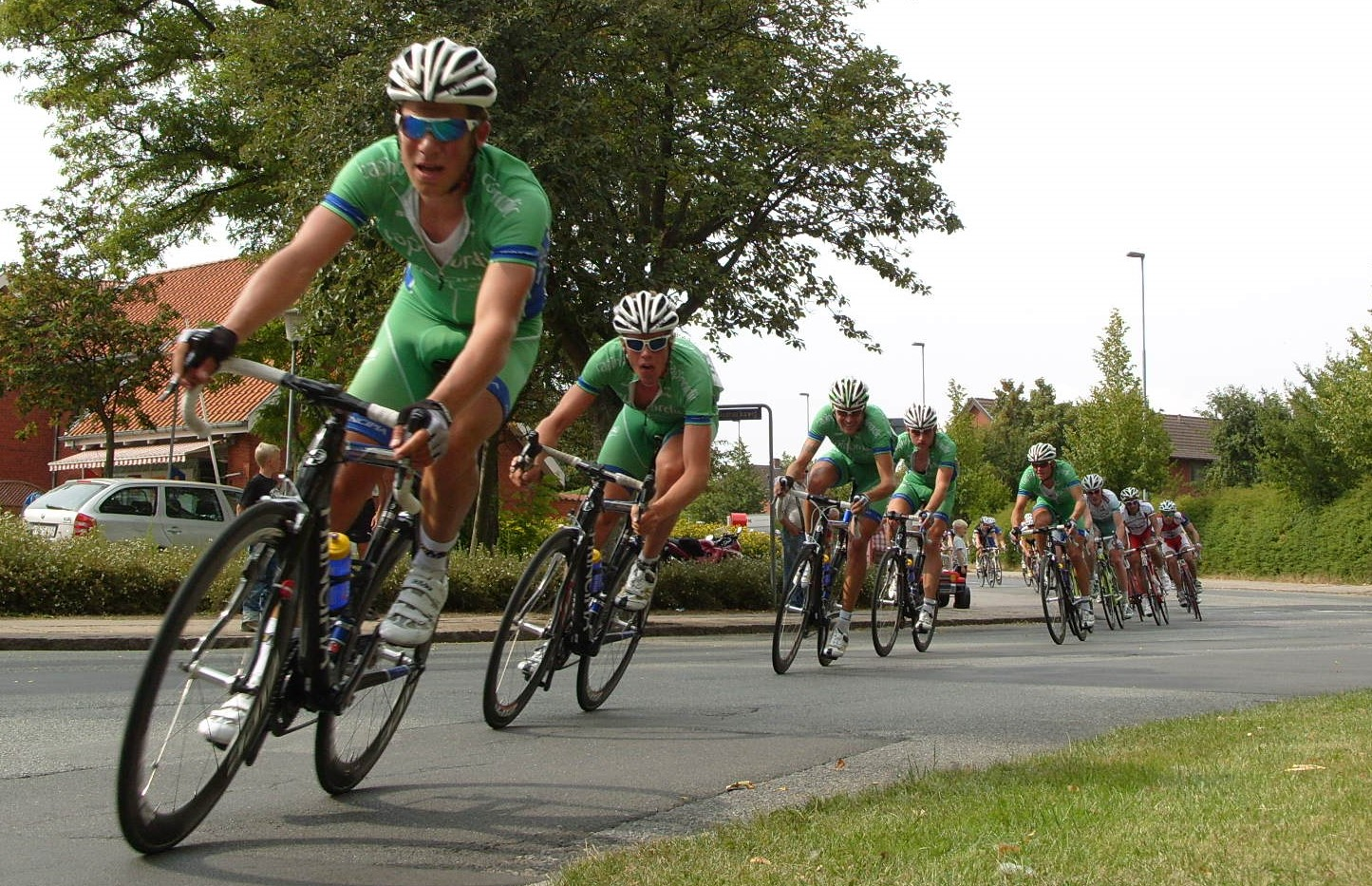

Team information
- UCI code: TPH (2004-2007) GLS (2008) CPI (2009)
- Registered: Denmark
- Founded: 2002
- Disbanded: 2009
- Discipline: Road
- Status: Division III (2004); UCI Continental (2005-2009)

Key personnel
- General manager: Søren Svenningsen
- Team managers: Tom Breschel; Rolf Sørensen; Jesper Fredsgaard; Brian Dandanell

Team name history
- 2002–2004 2005–2007 2008 2009: Team PH; Team GLS; Team GLS-Pakke Shop; Team Capinordic

Team Capinordic was a Danish UCI Continental cycling team. It was founded in 2002 and disbanded in 2009.
