= 2005 Quick-Step–Innergetic season =

Quick-Step–Innergetic
- 2005 season
- UCI code: QSI
- Status: UCI ProTeam
- World Tour Rank: 12th
- Manager: Patrick Lefevere
- Main sponsor(s): Quick-Step
- Based: Belgium

Season victories
- One-day races: 10
- Stage race overall: 3
- Stage race stages: 23
- World Championships: 2
- Most wins: Tom Boonen (13 wins)
- Best ranked rider: Tom Boonen (2nd)

The 2005 season for Quick-Step–Innergetic began in January at the Tour Down Under.

Three riders announced their retirements from cycling in 2004. Johan Museeuw made 2004 his last year of professional racing after riding for the team for 2003, 2004 and with the team's predecessor Mapei–Quick-Step for 6 years. Richard Virenque seven-time winner of the Mountains classification in the Tour de France also retired, he won the last two of his seven victories at Quick-Step. Laurent Dufaux Two-time winner of the Critérium du Dauphiné also retired at the end of 2004 after one year with the team.

== 2005 roster ==
As of 31 December 2005.

| Rider | Date of birth |
|---|---|
| Paolo Bettini (ITA) | 1 April 1974 (aged 31) |
| Tom Boonen (BEL) | 15 October 1980 (aged 25) |
| Davide Bramati (ITA) | 28 June 1968 (aged 37) |
| Mads Christensen (DEN) | 6 April 1984 (aged 21) |
| Wilfried Cretskens (BEL) | 10 July 1976 (aged 29) |
| Dimitri De Fauw (BEL) | 13 July 1981 (aged 24) |
| Kevin De Weert (BEL) | 27 May 1982 (aged 23) |
| Addy Engels (NED) | 17 June 1977 (aged 28) |
| José Antonio Garrido (ESP) | 28 November 1975 (aged 30) |
| Kevin Hulsmans (BEL) | 11 April 1978 (aged 27) |
| Servais Knaven (NED) | 6 March 1971 (aged 34) |
| Marc Lotz (NED) | 19 October 1973 (aged 32) |
| Jasper Melis (Note: Melis joined as a Stagiaire from 1 January) (BEL) | 12 October 1985 (aged 20) |
| Juan Miguel Mercado (ESP) | 8 July 1978 (aged 27) |
| Cristian Moreni (ITA) | 21 November 1972 (aged 33) |
| Kevin Neirynck (Note: Neirynck joined as a Stagiaire from 1 August) (BEL) | 16 November 1982 (aged 23) |

| Rider | Date of birth |
|---|---|
| Nick Nuyens (BEL) | 5 May 1980 (aged 25) |
| Luca Paolini (ITA) | 17 January 1977 (aged 28) |
| José Antonio Pecharromán (ESP) | 10 June 1978 (aged 27) |
| Filippo Pozzato (ITA) | 10 September 1981 (aged 24) |
| Michael Rogers (AUS) | 20 December 1979 (aged 26) |
| Sébastien Rosseler (BEL) | 15 July 1981 (aged 24) |
| Ivan Santaromita (Note: Santaromita joined as a Stagiaire from 1 August) (ITA) | 30 April 1984 (aged 21) |
| Patrik Sinkewitz (GER) | 20 October 1980 (aged 25) |
| Bram Tankink (NED) | 3 December 1978 (aged 27) |
| Guido Trenti (USA) | 27 December 1972 (aged 33) |
| Jurgen Van Goolen (BEL) | 28 November 1980 (aged 25) |
| Rik Verbrugghe (BEL) | 23 July 1974 (aged 31) |
| Davide Viganò (Note: Viganò joined from Team Androni Giocattoli on 25 July) (ITA) | 12 June 1984 (aged 21) |
| Wouter Weylandt (BEL) | 27 September 1984 (aged 21) |
| Stefano Zanini (ITA) | 23 July 1969 (aged 36) |

Riders who joined the team for the 2005 season

| Rider | 2004 team |
|---|---|
| Kevin De Weert | Rabobank |
| Addy Engels | Bankgiroloterij |
| Marc Lotz | Rabobank |
| Cristian Moreni | Alessio–Bianchi |
| Filippo Pozzato | Fassa Bortolo |
| Sébastien Rosseler | Relax–Bodysol |
| Guido Trenti | Fassa Bortolo |
| Rik Verbrugghe | Lotto–Domo |
| Davide Viganò | Androni Giocattoli–3C Casalinghi |

Riders who left the team during or after the 2004 season

| Rider | 2005 team |
|---|---|
| Frédéric Amorison | Davitamon–Lotto |
| László Bodrogi | Crédit Agricole |
| Aurélien Clerc | Phonak |
| Laurent Dufaux | Retired |
| Pedro Horrillo | Rabobank |
| Johan Museeuw | Retired |
| Sven Vanthourenhout | Rabobank Continental Team |
| Richard Virenque | Retired |

== One-day races ==
The one-day race season for QuickStep started at the Doha International GP in January. It wasn't until Gran Premio di Lugano in February where the team would get their first victory. Rik Verbrugghe won the race from a breakaway sprint against Patrice Halgand.

Quick-Step went 1st and 2nd at this years edition of Omloop Het Volk with Nick Nuyens attacking with 15 km to go and holding a 14-second lead to the line. Then Tom Boonen managed to sprint the rest of the peloton to gained 2nd in the race.

Other victories of the season included Pozzato at the Giro del Lazio and Bettini at Züri Metzgete.

=== Spring classics ===
The Spring classic started off with Milan–San Remo in March. With 10 km before the start of the final climb Il Poggio Bettini came to the front of the bunch and put in a hard effort to create a gap. This forced Fassa Bortolo to chase and do the work allowing Boonen to stay tucked out of the wind. Shortly after Kashechkin made it across to Bettini helping him to gain a 15-second advantage on the peloton this soon rose to 30 seconds with only Fassa Bortolo doing any work at the front. As the Duo reached the base of the Poggio their lead was back down to 15 seconds. As the riders climbed attacks were launched and the duo absorbed. With 2 km to go the riders were all back together with Fassa Bortolo driving the pace for Petacchi. Bettini launched his leadout with 600m to go Petacchi took his wheel then sailed past to win by two bike lengths. Boonen ended up with the best result for the team finishing 8th his best result to date.

The second classic of spring was E3 Prijs Vlaanderen. Boonen had won this race in 2004 so he was the faverourite for this edition. The race started with an 11-man break going up the road, Kevin Hulsmans was in the break for the team. This allowed the team to not work so much in the early kilometers. With 64 km to go and with Bramati and Cretskens driving the pace the breakaway had a one-minute advantage. Soon after an attack was launched containing 6 riders including Boonen and Andreas Klier. It didn't take the 6 long to catch the breakaway out in front, due to a train crossing the peloton got within 10 seconds of the now 17 strong breakaway. With 57 km to go and starting to climb the Taaienberg Klier attacked with Boonen sticking right on his wheel. The pair managed to hold the gap to the rest of the breakaway and at 50 km to go they had 30 seconds. On the top of the Knokteberg with 27 km to go the pair now held a 22-second advantage on the remaining 5 riders in the chase group. As the race continued the time gap reduced to 11 seconds with 19 km to go. At the base of the final climb the Tiegemberg, Boonen and Klier had 20 seconds in hand over the chase group. With two kilometers the duo had secured podium places holding 30 seconds over Peter van Petegem and the chase group behind. With Boonen accelerating from behind Klier with 200m to go he secured his second consecutive victory in the race.

The third classic for this season was the Tour of Flanders. The Team took Boonen as their sprinter for the race although the last few editions had been won by a breakaway. The team had planned to bring Bettini but he came down with mononucleosis. It took a while for the first break of the day to form, no riders from the team were present they were going all in to bring Boonen to the sprint. On climb number 10 with the team leading the peloton Ballan launched an attack which Quick-Step tried to cover but Ballan made it across to solo leader Zaballa. By climb 11 the duo had 45s on the Quick-Step led peloton. On climb 14, Boonen, Klier and Van Petegem bridged across to Petito and Zabel, with Ballan still out in front. Those six riders were riding flat out and essentially the race would be decided between them. Discover-Channel tried their best to tow the peloton back up but with Quick-Step, T-Mobile, Fassa Bortolo and Lotto not contributing the peloton had a very slim chance. With 10 km to go the 6 riders were still together, Van Petegem then attacked with Boonen countering. Van Petegem looked back to see if others would chase but they hesitated. No one expected sprinter Boonen to attack, he quickly gained 50 meters. With 5 km to go Boonen held a very slim 10s over the chasers. As Boonen rounded the final corner he had enough time to raise his hands and celebrate his victory.

This years Gent–Wevelgem was 208 km in length, the team bought Boonen with them as their main man. After winning E3 and being the winner last year, Boonen was the faverourite to win. With 85 km to ride a group of 30 went up the road containing: Boonen, Cretskens, Hulsmans and Knaven. As the race continued the group managed to gain 1 minute on the chasers with Boonen driving the pace at the front. With 41 km to go Flecha attacked Boonen was unable to follow but Pozzato was able to. With 25 km to go the Pozzato group had 20s on the Boonen group. Boonen sat up back into the peloton hoping the peloton would catch and he could win the sprint. Meanwhile, Pozzato was looking strong coming into the final 7 km until a crash on a corner took him out of contention. With the peloton not catching the breakaway Boonen finished 26th in the sprint.

The 'Hell of the North' this year would be ridden without 'The Lion of Flanders' who retired at the end of last year. After his impressive Tour of Flanders win Boonen was the faverourite for Paris–Roubaix this year. With 50 km of racking to go an 11-man group had formed at the head of the race with a 2-minute advantage over the peloton. Soon after Cancellara punctured and was forced to drop back, the breakaway kept on riding with Boonen pushing the pace. With just over 10 km to go Boonen increased the pace dropping everyone except George Hincapie and Juan Antonio Flecha. With 5 kilometers to go no one was attacking the chasers were 40s back with the cancellara group 3 minutes down and the peloton a further minute behind. The three-man sprint was launched by Flecha with 250m to go with Boonen coming down the banking to take victory and Hincapie giving it all to take second. This victory means Boonen became the 9th cyclist to win Tour of Flanders and Paris Roubaix in the same year. With the previous two being Peter Van Petegem in 2003 and Roger De Vlaeminck in 1977.

In the Dutch classic, The Amstel Gold Race, Patrik Sinkewitz managed to stay with the front runners the whole race and ended up sprinting for eighth.

Trying to improve on last years 21st position Sinkewitz lead the team in this years edition of La Flèche Wallonne. With 32 km left to race Rik Verbrugghe attacked hoping to bridge up to the leaders and repeat what he did in 2001 and win the classic. He managed to catch up to one of the riders out in front but the peloton soon caught them both. The peloton was still mostly together by the time the last climb came. Di Luca attacked and managed to win the uphill sprint with Sinkewitz managing 7th just 4 seconds down.

The final Spring Classic of the year was Liège–Bastogne–Liège. The team brought 2003 winner Paolo Bettini hoping for him to repeat the feat. After 171 km of racing the breakaway had 2'40" over the peloton which was splintering due to many attacks by many riders. Bettini was one such rider. He managed to get into a chase group of 11 riders and split away from the peloton. 12 km later the chase group was down to 7 with Bettini still in contention. With 68 km to go the chase had caught the break but the peloton was only 20 seconds behind in the next 14 km many riders would jump across the gap until Rebellin pulled the two groups together making one group of 30. With 52 km to go Voigt attacked and Vinokourov followed these two would not be caught over the rest of the race. Bettini punctured over the top of La Redoute, luckily Sinkewitz was there to tow him back into contention. Cadel Evans attacked with 3 km to go he was soon joined by Bettini and Michael Boogerd, the three rode hard getting to within 40 seconds of the leaders but it was a case of too little too late. Evans attacked on the final climb with Boogerd countering, Boogerd finished third with Bettini managing fourth.

=== Fall races ===
The Fall classics started with Paris–Brussels where Pozzato managed an 11th in the sprint. The following month in October Pozzato managed 14th in Paris–Tours. None of the other Fall classics provided great results except for Giro di Lombardia; where Bettini took a sprint victory from companions Gilberto Simoni and Fränk Schleck. This was the first victory of the Team in this race, although it was won in 1998 by the team's predecessor Mapei–Bricobi.

== Stage races ==
The Tour Down Under was the first race that Quick-Step raced in 2005. The best result achieved by a rider was Dimitri De Fauw who placed 9th in the first stage in the bunch sprint.

February brought the second stage race of the season for the team the Tour of Qatar. Tom Boonen was the rider Quick-Step were in Qatar to support. He opened his season by taking Stage 1 beating Mario Cipollini and Robbie Hunter to the line. Boonen added to his tally by also taking Stage 2 from a reduced sprint of 18 riders this time beating Fabrizio Guidi and Robbie McEwen. By winning the first two stages and 9th, 2nd and 3rd in the remaining stages Boonen was able to win the Points classification by 50 points to McEwen. He also managed 4th Overall in the race and 2nd in the Youth classification.

Paris–Nice was the first race of the 2005 UCI ProTour. Quick-Step took Boonen for the sprints and World time-trial champion Michael Rogers for the Overall contention. The Tour opened with a 4 kilometer prologue with Rogers finishing 6 seconds down in 10th position. Stage 1 Boonen was considered the absolute favorite based on his results at the Tour of Qatar last month. During stage 1 the peloton suffered a crash which caused a split with 10 kilometers to go resulting in 23 riders being off the front. This bunch was led by Quick-Step who pulled the gap out to 41 seconds by the finish line they also delivered the win to Boonen who out sprinted Luciano André Pagliarini and Jaan Kirsipuu. Stage 2 was shortened to 46.5 kilometers after snow blocked the original route. Boonen too his fourth victor of the season in another bunch sprint. This gave him enough bonus seconds to take the leaders yellow jersey and also the points classification. With Stage 3 having another up hill finish Boonen looked poised to take a third win in a row. However, when it came down to the sprint with 400m to go Boonen was blocked in and couldn't manoeuvre around Jens Voigt so had to settle for 7th on the stage. Guido Trenti was better positioned and managed to finish the stage in 2nd behind Vicente Reynés. Stage 4 had more of a hilly finish so Boonen was not considered a favorite although he did finish in the top 10, 32 seconds behind stage winner and new leader Fabian Cancellara. Stage 7 was quite a tough stage with Boonen, Lotz and Hulsmans all not finishing. Bram Tankink was the best placed rider overall finishing the race in 24th.

At the same time as Paris–Nice, Tirreno–Adriatico was occurring. The team won Stage 5 from a breakaway with Servais Knaven in an edition where Sprinters Petacchi and Óscar Freire took every other stage. In the end the best placed rider was Wilfried Cretskens who finished 61st.

As April came along the third major tour began the Vuelta a Pais Vasco. Rogers was the designated leader for the race. Stage 1 was a hilly stage with puncher Di Luca taking the Stage, Rogers stayed safe and finished at the same time in 10th position. Rogers was able to keep up with the favorites most stages, in the final time-trial he took 6th and this was enough to secure 8th overall in the race.

With the season Boonen has had and the bonus of his home race he was touted as the faverourite for overall contention at the Tour of Belgium. Stage 1 was a sprint stage which Boonen won he won easily where "The only threat... was LPR's Danilo Napolitano...". Boonen also won Stage 2 and finishing 2nd in Stage 3a, it all came down to the final time-trial. Boonen successfully defended his lead by finishing second on the stage winning both the Overall and Points classification.

The first edition of the Eneco Tour of Benelux was good for the team taking the prologue with Verbrugghe and holding on for 6th overall as the tour concluded.

The Deutschland Tour was the final Pro Tour stage race of the season for Quick Step. Leading the team was defending champion Patrik Sinkewitz he would be racing against big names such as Jan Ullrich, Alexandre Vinokourov, Levi Leipheimer and Cadel Evans. Stage 1 was a 170 km hilly stage, after 30 km of racing Bram Tankink, Bernhard Eisel and Juan José Cobo attacked and formed a breakaway. They stayed away from the peloton for the whole stage at one point having a 10-minute advantage. With 16 kilometers to go Tankink attacked his companions and soloed to victory 48 seconds in front of Cobo and 3 minutes in front of the peloton. Stage 2 was a flat stage with two category 2 climbs at the end. These two climbs meant that when the race got to the finish line only 29 riders remained and most of them were climbers. Filippo Pozzato took the reduced bunch sprint only millimeters in front of Jörg Jaksche. Tankink lost just under 3 minutes to Pozzato, this meant that going into stage 3 Tankink held the leaders jersey with 13 seconds back to now second placed Pozzato. 23 seconds down was team leader Sinkewitz sitting at the same time as the other contenders. Stage 3 was a day for the sprinters with a small breakaway going up the road but the team rode on the front the whole stage keeping their leaders out of trouble. With 30 km to go many riders tried to attack and get away from the peoloton but Quick Step slowly wound them back in. With 2 km to go the race was going to end in a bunch sprint Liquigas–Bianchi was riding on the front for their sprinter Pagliarini. Lampre's Bennati was able to sprint to victory with Pozzato coming second. Stage 4 was the first Mountain stage of the tour as the riders reached the final climb the pace was too much for Sinkewitz and he struggled to keep up, as did many contenders. He was able to limit his losses and finish 10th on the stage moving him to 9th overall, 3 minutes down on stage winner Leipheimer. On Stage 5 Pozzato placed 9th during the sprint finish. The second Mountain stage, 7, was a tough one for the team with leader Sinkewitz losing 1:48 to Evans, dropping to 11th overall, and Pozzato pulling out. The decisive stage 8 time-trial was won by Ulrich with Sinkewitz finishing in 24th 2:34 down. Although he lost time on the leaders he gained one place on the Overall which he held through stage 9.

The Tour of Britain was a very dominating race for the team, winning 4 of the 6 stages plus the overall. During stage 1, the sprinters with Nick Nuyens launched at 250m to go, securing them a win by 2 seconds over Michael Blaudzun. Stage 2 saw a breakaway with Roger Hammond winning the stage and Mark Cavendish leading the peloton home and placing 3rd. Luca Paolini placed 4th. Stage 3 brought a second stage win for the team with Paolini winning the sprint from breakaway companions Bram Schmitz and Russell Downing. During stage 4, breakaway rider Sergei Ivanov took line honors, while Paolini led the group across the line with Cavendish taking the runner-up spot. Stage 5 was an all-important time-trial, Nuyens took his second stage win by an impressive margin of 0.75 seconds over Kurt-Asle Arvesen, bringing his lead to 8 seconds over Blaudzun. The final stage of the tour was a sprint stage where Paolini took his second stage win. In the end, Nuyens held on to overall win becoming the second rider in the history of the modern race to lead from start to finish. Paolini took the win in the Points classification after a very consistent tour.

== Grand Tours ==
=== Giro d'Italia ===
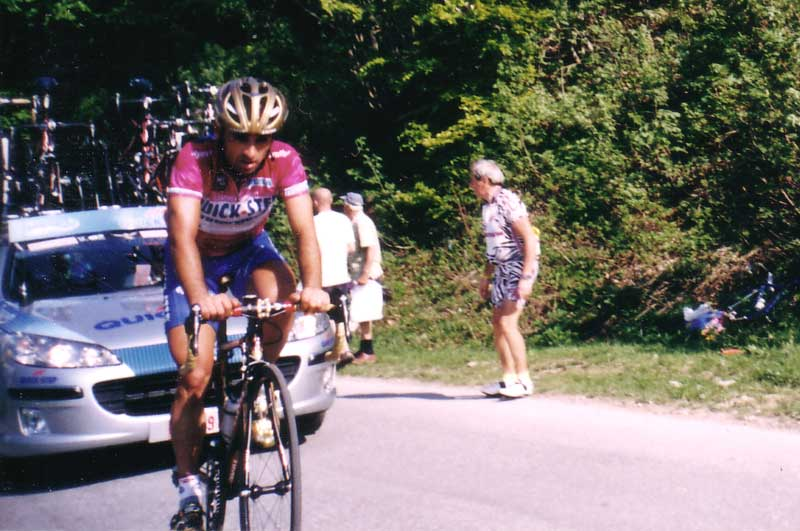
Paolo Bettini in the cyclamen jersey at the Giro d'Italia

On 3 May the team announced their line up for the Giro d'Italia. Stage 1 of the Giro was a Flat stage with an up hill finish, Paolo Bettini managed to surprise his rivals with a punchy attack allowing him to take the stage by three seconds this put him into the Maglia rosa for the first time in his career. Bettini lost the leaders jersey on Stage 2 after second placed Robbie McEwen won the stage and took enough time to lead Bettini by eight seconds. During Stage 3 Davide Bramati was assaulted by two spectators who stole his race number. The stage was a hilly stage, race leader McEwen lost 1 minute on a group of 50 riders in which was Bettini this gave Bettini the lead once again. Stage 4 was initially won by Bettini but he was relegated after being deemed to cause the crash of Baden Cooke in the final sprint, Bettini did retain the leaders jersey and now led the points classification. Danilo di Luca of Liquigas–Bianchi took his second stage win on stage 5 pushing Bettini into second in both the Points and Overall classifications. In Stage 6 Bettini took a bonus 6 seconds in an intermediate to take the lead of the Giro once again. Stage 7 was another hilly stage this ended with Bettini losing the lead and dropping to 12th overall and 3rd in the points classification. The next sprint stage was stage 9 in which Bettini got pipped on the line by Alessandro Petacchi, still in third on the points classification but now only 1 point behind first position. It was only after McEwen didn't finish the tough mountain stage 13 that Bettini once again was leading the points classification. The Points jersey switched to Di Luca after stage 14 but then back to Bettini the following day after Bettini finished third to Petacchi. Bettini held the points classification all the way to Milan to secure his first Points classification win in the Giro d'Italia. Bettini was the best placed rider overall finishing 38th.

=== Tour de France ===
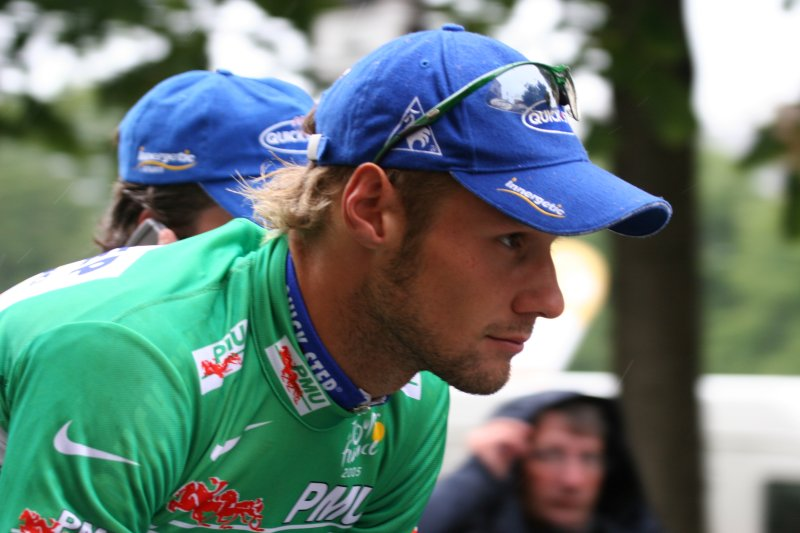
Tom Boonen in the Green jersey at the Tour

On 30 June the team announced that they would ride the Tour supporting Tom Boonen in the sprints with Patrik Sinkewitz and Michael Rogers aiming for the overall victory. Rogers was a faverourite for the opening time-trial however he "couldn't find the right rhythm" and finished the stage in 45th. Stage 2 was more successful with Boonen taking the sprint in front of Thor Hushovd and Robbie McEwen this put him into the lead of the Points classification. Boonen went two for two also taking victory in the Stage 3 sprint extending his lead in the points classification. Boonen managed second place to McEwen in Stage 5 this helped him hold the Green jersey till the end of Stage 11 where he did not start due to a knee injury. With Boonen now out Guido Trenti led the team for the sprints, he managed a fourth behind McEwen in Stage 13. Rogers and Sinkewitz both lost over 20 minutes on stage 14 thereby ruining any chance they had of a high General classification placing. At the end of the Tour Rogers was the best placed rider at 41st position.

=== Vuelta a España ===
The team's Vuelta started off better than any of the previous Grand Tours with Rik Verbrugghe finishing the individual time trial 1 second behind winner Denis Menchov. This result meant that Verbrugghe would wear the Mountain classification jersey in Stage 2. With the dynamic duo of sprinters Tom Boonen and Paolo Bettini the team had a good chance of victory on the flat stages. The first opportunity for this came on Stage 3 where Boonen finished in third behind Alessandro Petacchi. On Stage 6 Juan Miguel Mercado finished in 5th position 49 seconds down on Roberto Heras moving him up to 8th overall. Stage 8 gave Quick-Step the next chance at victory, a flat stage resulting in a sprint finish. However, when it came down to the end Petacchi was too strong and the team managed 3rd with Bettini and 5th with Boonen. Stage 9 was a 48 kilometer time-trial which resulted in Mercado losing 4 places and dropping to 13th Overall. Mercado gained those places back in the following stage by finishing 6 seconds down on race leader Menchov in the hilly finish. Boonen abandoned the race before the start of Stage 14 stating that the following mountain stages wouldn't help his chances of winning the world championships. This left Bettini as the team leader coming into stage 16 where he then beat Petacchi to the line claiming his first Vuelta stage. At the end of the Vuelta Mercado finished the highest place in a grand tour this season that was 10th.

== Season victories ==
| Date | Race | Competition | Rider | Country | Location |
|---|---|---|---|---|---|
| 31 January | Tour of Qatar, Stage 1 | UCI Asia Tour | Tom Boonen (BEL) | Qatar | Doha Hyatt Plaza |
| 1 February | Tour of Qatar, Stage 2 | UCI Asia Tour | Tom Boonen (BEL) | Qatar | Qatar Olympic Committee |
| 4 February | Tour of Qatar, Points classification | UCI Asia Tour | Tom Boonen (BEL) | Qatar | |
| 26 February | Omloop Het Volk | UCI Europe Tour | Nick Nuyens (BEL) | Belgium | Lokeren |
| 27 February | GP Lugano | UCI Europe Tour | Rik Verbrugghe (BEL) | Switzerland | Lugano |
| 7 March | Paris–Nice, Stage 1 | UCI ProTour | Tom Boonen (BEL) | France | Chabris |
| 8 March | Paris–Nice, Stage 2 | UCI ProTour | Tom Boonen (BEL) | France | Thiers, Puy-de-Dôme |
| 13 March | Tirreno–Adriatico, Stage 5 | UCI ProTour | Servais Knaven (NED) | Italy | Saltara |
| 26 March | E3 Prijs Vlaanderen | UCI Europe Tour | Tom Boonen (BEL) | Belgium | Harelbeke |
| 3 April | Tour of Flanders | UCI ProTour | Tom Boonen (BEL) | Belgium | Meerbeke |
| 10 April | Paris–Roubaix | UCI ProTour | Tom Boonen (BEL) | France | Roubaix |
| 25 April | Tour of Belgium, Stage 1 | UCI Europe Tour | Tom Boonen (BEL) | Belgium | Ostend |
| 26 April | Tour of Belgium, Stage 2 | UCI Europe Tour | Tom Boonen (BEL) | Belgium | Knokke-Heist |
| 29 April | Tour of Belgium, Overall | UCI Europe Tour | Tom Boonen (BEL) | Belgium | |
| 29 April | Tour of Belgium, Points classification | UCI Europe Tour | Tom Boonen (BEL) | Belgium | |
| 8 May | Giro d'Italia, Stage 1 | UCI ProTour | Paolo Bettini (ITA) | Italy | Tropea |
| 14 May | Tour de Picardie, Stage 2 | UCI Europe Tour | Tom Boonen (BEL) | France | Clerment |
| 29 May | Giro d'Italia, Points classification | UCI ProTour | Paolo Bettini (ITA) | Italy | |
| 3 July | Tour de France, Stage 2 | UCI ProTour | Tom Boonen (BEL) | France | Les Essarts |
| 4 July | Tour de France, Stage 3 | UCI ProTour | Tom Boonen (BEL) | France | Tours |
| 3 July | Tour of Austria, Stage 2 | UCI Europe Tour | Juan Miguel Mercado (ESP) | Austria | Nussdorf, Vienna |
| 10 July | Tour of Austria, Overall | UCI Europe Tour | Juan Miguel Mercado (ESP) | Austria | |
| 27 July | Tour de la Région Wallonne, Stage 3 | UCI Europe Tour | Luca Paolini (ITA) | Belgium | Amay |
| 31 July | HEW Cyclassics | UCI ProTour | Filippo Pozzato (ITA) | Germany | Hamburg |
| 3 August | Eneco Tour, Prologue | UCI ProTour | Rik Verbrugghe (BEL) | Netherlands | Mechelen |
| 6 August | Giro del Lazio | UCI Europe Tour | Filippo Pozzato (ITA) | Italy | Nettuno |
| 7 August | Tour de l'Ain, Stage 1 | UCI Europe Tour | Cristian Moreni (ITA) | France | Lagnieu Plaine de l'Ain |
| 15 August | Deutschland Tour, Stage 1 | UCI ProTour | Bram Tankink (NED) | Germany | Plauen |
| 16 August | Deutschland Tour, Stage 2 | UCI ProTour | Filippo Pozzato (ITA) | Germany | Bodenmais |
| 30 August | Tour of Britain, Stage 1 | UCI Europe Tour | Nick Nuyens (BEL) | United Kingdom | Castle Douglas |
| 1 September | Tour of Britain, Stage 3 | UCI Europe Tour | Luca Paolini (ITA) | United Kingdom | Sheffield |
| 3 September | Tour of Britain, Stage 5 (ITT) | UCI Europe Tour | Nick Nuyens (BEL) | United Kingdom | Birmingham |
| 4 September | Tour of Britain, Stage 6 | UCI Europe Tour | Luca Paolini (ITA) | United Kingdom | London |
| 4 September | Tour of Britain, Overall | UCI Europe Tour | Nick Nuyens (BEL) | United Kingdom | |
| 4 September | Tour of Britain, Points classification | UCI Europe Tour | Luca Paolini (ITA) | United Kingdom | |
| 13 September | Vuelta a España, Stage 16 | UCI ProTour | Paolo Bettini (ITA) | Spain | Valladolid |
| 14 September | Grand Prix de Wallonie | UCI Europe Tour | Nick Nuyens (BEL) | Belgium | Namur |
| 2 October | Züri-Metzgete | UCI ProTour | Paolo Bettini (ITA) | Switzerland | Zürich |
| 15 October | Giro di Lombardia | UCI ProTour | Paolo Bettini (ITA) | Italy | Como |

== National, Continental and World champions ==
| Date | Discipline | Jersey | Rider | Country | Location |
|---|---|---|---|---|---|
| 22 September | World Time Trial Champion | | Michael Rogers (AUS) | Spain | Madrid |
| 25 September | World Road Race Champion | | Tom Boonen (BEL) | Spain | Madrid |
