= 2007 Tour de Suisse =

2007 UCI ProTour, race 15 of 26

Race details
- Dates: 16–24 June 2007
- Stages: 9
- Distance: 1,252.4 km (778.2 mi)
- Winning time: 30h 07' 23"

Results
	Winner	Vladimir Karpets (RUS)	(Caisse d'Epargne)
	Second	Kim Kirchen (LUX)	(T-Mobile Team)
	Third	Stijn Devolder (BEL)	(Discovery Channel)
	Points	Daniele Bennati (ITA)	(Lampre–Fondital)
	Mountains	Vladimir Gusev (RUS)	(Discovery Channel)
	Sprints	Florian Stalder (SUI)	(Team Volksbank)
	Team	Caisse d'Epargne	

The 2007 Tour de Suisse, the 71st edition of the cycle race, took place from 16 June until 24 June. As usual, the race began with a short prologue and featured a long individual time trial. Besides, riders also had to face several mountain stages in the Swiss Alps, including the Grimselpass, a 12.1 kilometres long climb with an average gradient of 6.6% and slopes at 10%. The race also visited the neighbouring countries of Liechtenstein and Austria.

The four top finishers of the 2006 edition, Jan Ullrich, Koldo Gil, Jörg Jaksche and Ángel Vicioso did not take part in 2007, as in one way or another they were all affected by the Operación Puerto affair. Koldo Gil was the only one of these riders who was not left without a team, after Ullrich was fired by his T-Mobile Team and Vicioso and Jaksche's team Liberty Seguros–Würth folded.

== Teams ==
Twenty-one teams of eight riders started the race:

- T-Mobile Team
- Team CSC
- Liquigas
- AG2R Prévoyance
- Saunier Duval–Prodir
- Discovery Channel
- Rabobank
- Astana
- Caisse d'Epargne
- Quick-Step–Innergetic
- Predictor–Lotto
- Lampre–Fondital
- Gerolsteiner
- Crédit Agricole
- Bouygues Télécom
- Euskaltel–Euskadi
- Française des Jeux
- Cofidis
- Unibet.com
- Team Milram
- Team Volksbank

== Route ==
Stage characteristics and winners
Stage	Date	Course	Distance	Type	Winner
1	16 June	Olten	3.8 km (2.4 mi)	Individual time trial	Fabian Cancellara (SUI)
2	17 June	Olten to Luzern	157.2 km (97.7 mi)	Hilly stage	Erik Zabel (GER)
3	18 June	Brunnen to Nauders	228.7 km (142.1 mi)	Mountain stage	Alessandro Proni (ITA)
4	19 June	Nauders to Triesenberg–Malbun	167.2 km (103.9 mi)	Medium mountain stage	Fränk Schleck (LUX)
5	20 June	Vaduz to Giubiasco	192.8 km (119.8 mi)	Mountain stage	Robbie McEwen (AUS)
6	21 June	Giubiasco to Crans-Montana	95 km (59 mi) (Note: The stage was originally planned to be 190.8 km (118.6 mi), but was shortened due to a hailstorm.)	Medium mountain stage	Thomas Dekker (NED)
7	22 June	Ulrichen to Grimselpass	125.7 km (78.1 mi)	Mountain stage	Vladimir Gusev (RUS)
8	23 June	Innertkirchen to Schwarzsee	152.5 km (94.8 mi)	Hilly stage	Rigoberto Urán (COL)
9	24 June	Bern	33.7 km (20.9 mi)	Individual time trial	Fabian Cancellara (SUI)

== Stages ==
=== Stage 1 ===
16 June 2007 – Olten, 3.8 km (2.4 mi) (ITT)

Stage 1 Result & General Classification after Stage 1

	Cyclist	Team	Time	UCI ProTour Points
1	Fabian Cancellara (SUI)	Team CSC	4' 20"	3 pts
2	Daniele Bennati (ITA)	Lampre–Fondital	+ 8"	2 pts
3	Iván Gutiérrez (ESP)	Caisse d'Epargne	+ 9"	1 pt
4	William Bonnet (FRA)	Crédit Agricole	+ 10"	
5	Stuart O'Grady (AUS)	Team CSC	+ 10"	

=== Stage 2 ===
17 June 2007 – Olten to Luzern, 158.6 km (98.5 mi)

Stage 2 result

	Cyclist	Team	Time	UCI ProTour Points
1	Erik Zabel (GER)	Team Milram	4h 04' 56"	3 pts
2	Daniele Bennati (ITA)	Lampre–Fondital	s.t.	2 pts
3	Fabian Cancellara (SUI)	Team CSC	s.t.	1 pt
4	Stuart O'Grady (AUS)	Team CSC	s.t.	
5	Murilo Fischer (BRA)	Liquigas	s.t.	

General Classification after Stage 2

	Cyclist	Team	Time
1	Fabian Cancellara (SUI)	Team CSC	4h 09' 10"
2	Daniele Bennati (ITA)	Lampre–Fondital	+ 7"
3	Iván Gutiérrez (ESP)	Caisse d'Epargne	+ 15"
4	William Bonnet (FRA)	Crédit Agricole	+ 16"
5	Stuart O'Grady (AUS)	Team CSC	+ 16"

=== Stage 3 ===
18 June 2007 – Brunnen to Nauders, 228.7 km (142.1 mi)

Stage 3 result

	Cyclist	Team	Time	UCI ProTour Points
1	Alessandro Proni (ITA)	Quick-Step–Innergetic	6h 02' 17"	3 pts
2	Xavier Florencio (ESP)	Bouygues Télécom	+ 7"	2 pts
3	Kim Kirchen (LUX)	T-Mobile Team	+ 7"	1 pt
4	Cristian Moreni (ITA)	Cofidis	+ 7"	
5	Fränk Schleck (LUX)	Team CSC	+ 7"	

General Classification after Stage 3

	Cyclist	Team	Time
1	Fabian Cancellara (SUI)	Team CSC	10h 11' 34"
2	Alessandro Proni (ITA)	Quick-Step–Innergetic	+ 2"
3	Kim Kirchen (LUX)	T-Mobile Team	+ 14"
4	Xavier Florencio (ESP)	Bouygues Télécom	+ 15"
5	Martin Elmiger (SUI)	AG2R Prévoyance	+ 17"

=== Stage 4 ===
19 June 2007 – Nauders to Triesenberg–Malbun, 167.2 km (103.9 mi)

Stage 4 result

	Cyclist	Team	Time	UCI ProTour Points
1	Fränk Schleck (LUX)	Team CSC	4h 20' 37"	3 pts
2	Vladimir Efimkin (RUS)	Caisse d'Epargne	+ 32"	2 pts
3	José Ángel Gómez Marchante (ESP)	Saunier Duval–Prodir	+ 42"	1 pt
4	Matteo Carrara (ITA)	Unibet.com	+ 48"	
5	Kim Kirchen (LUX)	T-Mobile Team	+ 48"	

General Classification after Stage 4

	Cyclist	Team	Time
1	Fränk Schleck (LUX)	Team CSC	14h 32' 24"
2	Vladimir Efimkin (RUS)	Caisse d'Epargne	+ 49"
3	Kim Kirchen (LUX)	T-Mobile Team	+ 49"
4	José Ángel Gómez Marchante (ESP)	Saunier Duval–Prodir	+ 58"
5	Matteo Carrara (ITA)	Unibet.com	+ 1' 05"

=== Stage 5 ===
20 June 2007 – Vaduz to Giubiasco, 192.8 km (119.8 mi)

Stage 5 result

	Cyclist	Team	Time	UCI ProTour Points
1	Robbie McEwen (AUS)	Predictor–Lotto	4h 55' 39"	3 pts
2	Daniele Bennati (ITA)	Lampre–Fondital	s.t.	2 pts
3	Erik Zabel (GER)	Team Milram	s.t.	1 pt
4	Murilo Fischer (BRA)	Liquigas	s.t.	
5	Cristian Moreni (ITA)	Cofidis	s.t.	

General Classification after Stage 5

	Cyclist	Team	Time
1	Fränk Schleck (LUX)	Team CSC	19h 28' 03"
2	Vladimir Efimkin (RUS)	Caisse d'Epargne	+ 49"
3	Kim Kirchen (LUX)	T-Mobile Team	+ 49"
4	José Ángel Gómez Marchante (ESP)	Saunier Duval–Prodir	+ 58"
5	Matteo Carrara (ITA)	Unibet.com	+ 1' 05"

=== Stage 6 ===
21 June 2007 – Giubiasco to Crans-Montana, 190.5 km (118.4 mi)

Due to a hailstorm, race officials once abandoned the stage. The stage was later restarted in Ulrichen and was shortened to 95 kilometers. The hors catégorie climb of Nufenenpass was cancelled as well.

Stage 6 result

	Cyclist	Team	Time	UCI ProTour Points
1	Thomas Dekker (NED)	Rabobank	2h 28' 00"	3 pts
2	Gerrit Glomser (AUT)	Team Volksbank	+ 8"	N/A
3	Gilberto Simoni (ITA)	Saunier Duval–Prodir	+ 11"	1 pt
4	Vladimir Karpets (RUS)	Caisse d'Epargne	+ 11"	
5	Damiano Cunego (ITA)	Saunier Duval–Prodir	+ 11"	

General Classification after Stage 6

	Cyclist	Team	Time
1	Vladimir Efimkin (RUS)	Caisse d'Epargne	21h 57' 03"
2	José Ángel Gómez Marchante (ESP)	Saunier Duval–Prodir	+ 9"
3	Fränk Schleck (LUX)	Team CSC	+ 21"
4	Matteo Carrara (ITA)	Unibet.com	+ 26"
5	Vladimir Karpets (RUS)	Caisse d'Epargne	+ 30"

=== Stage 7 ===
22 June 2007 – Ulrichen to Grimselpass, 125.7 km (78.1 mi)

Stage 7 result

	Cyclist	Team	Time	UCI ProTour Points
1	Vladimir Gusev (RUS)	Discovery Channel	3h 53' 50"	3 pts
2	Chris Horner (USA)	Predictor–Lotto	+ 2' 02"	2 pts
3	Andreas Klöden (GER)	Astana	+ 2' 37"	1 pt
4	Marzio Bruseghin (ITA)	Lampre–Fondital	+ 2' 37"	
5	Beat Zberg (SUI)	Gerolsteiner	+ 3' 00"	

General Classification after Stage 7

	Cyclist	Team	Time
1	Vladimir Efimkin (RUS)	Caisse d'Epargne	24h 55' 08"
2	Kim Kirchen (LUX)	T-Mobile Team	+ 24"
3	Vladimir Karpets (RUS)	Caisse d'Epargne	+ 30"
4	Matteo Carrara (ITA)	Unibet.com	+ 31"
5	Fränk Schleck (LUX)	Team CSC	+ 33"

=== Stage 8 ===
23 June 2007 – Innertkirchen to Schwarzsee, 152.5 km (94.8 mi)

Stage 8 result

	Cyclist	Team	Time	UCI ProTour Points
1	Rigoberto Urán (COL)	Unibet.com	3h 28' 51"	3 pts
2	Cristian Moreni (ITA)	Cofidis	+ 2"	2 pts
3	Andreas Klöden (GER)	Astana	s.t.	1 pt
4	Stefan Schumacher (GER)	Gerolsteiner	s.t.	
5	Gerrit Glomser (AUT)	Team Volksbank	s.t.	

General Classification after Stage 8

	Cyclist	Team	Time
1	Vladimir Efimkin (RUS)	Caisse d'Epargne	29h 24' 01"
2	Kim Kirchen (LUX)	T-Mobile Team	+ 24"
3	Vladimir Karpets (RUS)	Caisse d'Epargne	+ 30"
4	Matteo Carrara (ITA)	Unibet.com	+ 31"
5	Fränk Schleck (LUX)	Team CSC	+ 33"

=== Stage 9 ===
24 June 2007 – Bern, 34.2 km (21.3 mi) (ITT)

Stage 9 result

	Cyclist	Team	Time	UCI ProTour Points
1	Fabian Cancellara (SUI)	Team CSC	41' 46"	3 pts
2	Andreas Klöden (GER)	Astana	+ 20"	2 pts
3	Stefan Schumacher (GER)	Gerolsteiner	+ 33"	1 pt
4	Stijn Devolder (BEL)	Discovery Channel	+ 1' 04"	
5	Vladimir Gusev (RUS)	Discovery Channel	+ 1' 05"	

Final General Classification

	Cyclist	Team	Time
1	Vladimir Karpets (RUS)	Caisse d'Epargne	30h 07' 23"
2	Kim Kirchen (LUX)	T-Mobile Team	+ 1' 04"
3	Stijn Devolder (BEL)	Discovery Channel	+ 1' 30"
4	Matteo Carrara (ITA)	Unibet.com	+ 1' 30"
5	Damiano Cunego (ITA)	Lampre–Fondital	+ 1' 41"

== Final standings ==
=== General classification ===
	Cyclist	Team	Time	UCI ProTour Points
1	Vladimir Karpets (RUS)	Caisse d'Epargne	30h 07' 23"	50
2	Kim Kirchen (LUX)	T-Mobile Team	+ 1' 04"	40
3	Stijn Devolder (BEL)	Discovery Channel	+ 1' 30"	35
4	Matteo Carrara (ITA)	Unibet.com	+ 1' 30"	30
5	Damiano Cunego (ITA)	Lampre–Fondital	+ 1' 41"	25
6	Vladimir Efimkin (RUS)	Caisse d'Epargne	+ 1' 46"	20
7	Fränk Schleck (LUX)	Team CSC	+ 1' 47"	15
8	Gerrit Glomser (AUT)	Team Volksbank	+ 2' 50"	–
9	Rigoberto Urán (COL)	Unibet.com	+ 3' 16"	5
10	Andreas Klöden (GER)	Astana	+ 3' 19"	2

=== Points classification ===
	Cyclist	Team	Points
1	Daniele Bennati (ITA)	Lampre–Fondital	60
2	Fabian Cancellara (SUI)	Team CSC	57
3	Andreas Klöden (GER)	Astana	50

=== Mountains classification ===
	Cyclist	Team	Points
1	Vladimir Gusev (RUS)	Discovery Channel	45
2	Daniel Navarro (ESP)	Astana	36
3	Marzio Bruseghin (ITA)	Lampre–Fondital	34

=== Sprint classification ===
	Cyclist	Team	Points
1	Florian Stalder (SUI)	Team Volksbank	29
2	Luis Pasamontes (ESP)	Unibet.com	14
3	René Weissinger (GER)	Team Volksbank	12

=== Team classification ===
	Team Name	Time
1	Caisse d'Epargne	90h 27' 56"
2	Unibet.com	+ 4' 29"
3	Discovery Channel	+ 8' 50"
