= Bailetti =

Bailetti is an Italian surname. Notable people with the surname include:

- Antonio Bailetti (1937–2025), Italian cyclist
- Héctor Bailetti (born 1947), Peruvian footballer
- Paolo Bailetti (born 1980), Italian cyclist
