= 2005 UCI Europe Tour =

Cycling competition

- First edition of the UCI Europe Tour

Details
- Dates: 10 February 2005–13 October 2005
- Location: Europe
- Races: About 300+

Champions
- Individual champion: Murilo Fischer (BRA) (Naturino–Sapore di Mare)
- Teams' champion: AG2R Prévoyance
- Nations' champion: Italy

The 2005 UCI Europe Tour was the first season of the UCI Europe Tour. The season began on 10 February 2005 with the Grand Prix Cycliste la Marseillaise and ended on 13 October 2005 with the Giro del Piemonte. Murilo Fischer of Brazil was crowned as the 2005 UCI Europe Tour.

Throughout the season, points are awarded to the top finishers of stages within stage races and the final general classification standings of each of the stages races and one-day events. The quality and complexity of a race also determines how many points are awarded to the top finishers, the higher the UCI rating of a race, the more points are awarded.

The UCI ratings from highest to lowest are as follows:

- Multi-day events: 2.HC, 2.1 and 2.2
- One-day events: 1.HC, 1.1 and 1.2

== Events ==
Date	Race name	Location	UCI Rating	Winner	Team
1 February	Grand Prix Cycliste la Marseillaise	France	1.1	Nicki Sörensen (DEN)	Team CSC
2–6 February	Étoile de Bessèges	France	2.1	Freddy Bichot (FRA)	Française des Jeux
6 February	Gran Premio della Costa Etruschi	Italy	1.1	Alessandro Petacchi (ITA)	Fassa Bortolo
6 February	Trofeo Mallorca	Spain	1.1	Óscar Freire (ESP)	Rabobank
7 February	Trofeo Alcudia	Spain	1.1	Óscar Freire (ESP)	Rabobank
8 February	Trofeo Manacor	Spain	1.1	Alejandro Valverde (ESP)	Illes Balears–Caisse d'Epargne
9 February	Trofeo Soller	Spain	1.1	Alejandro Valverde (ESP)	Illes Balears–Caisse d'Epargne
9–13 February	Tour Méditerranéen	France	2.1	Jens Voigt (GER)	Team CSC
10 February	Trofeo Calvià	Spain	1.1	Antonio Colóm (ESP)	Illes Balears–Caisse d'Epargne
10–13 February	GP Costa Azul	Portugal	2.1	Rubén Plaza (ESP)	Comunidad Valenciana
13–17 February	Vuelta a Andalucía	Spain	2.1	Francisco Cabello (ESP)	Comunidad Valenciana
15 February	Trofeo Laigueglia	Italy	1.1	Kim Kirchen (LUX)	Fassa Bortolo
16–20 February	Volta ao Algarve	Portugal	2.1	Hugo Sabido (POR)	Paredes Rota dos Moveis–Beira Tamega
19 February	Tour du Haut Var	France	2.1	Philippe Gilbert (BEL)	Française des Jeux
19 February	Trofeo Luis Puig	Spain	1.1	Alessandro Petacchi (ITA)	Fassa Bortolo
19–20 February	Critérium des Espoirs	France	2.2	Jean Mespoulede (FRA)	CC Marmande 47
20 February	Classic Haribo	France	1.1	Gorik Gardeyn (BEL)	Mr Bookmaker.com-Sports Tech
22–26 February	Volta a la Comunitat Valenciana	Spain	2.1	Alessandro Petacchi (ITA)	Fassa Bortolo
26 February	Omloop Het Volk	Belgium	1.HC	Nick Nuyens (BEL)	Quick-Step–Innergetic
26 February	Gran Premio di Chiasso	Switzerland	1.1	Kim Kirchen (LUX)	Fassa Bortolo
26 February	Beverbeek Classic	Belgium	1.2	Jarno Van Mingeroet (BEL)	Profel Cycling Team
27 February	Kuurne–Brussels–Kuurne	Belgium	1.1	George Hincapie (USA)	Discovery Channel
27 February	Clásica de Almería	Spain	1.1	Iván Gutiérrez (ESP)	Illes Balears–Caisse d'Epargne
27 February	Gran Premio di Lugano	Switzerland	1.1	Rik Verbrugghe (BEL)	Quick-Step–Innergetic
2–6 March	Vuelta a Murcia	Spain	2.1	Koldo Gil (ESP)	Liberty Seguros–Würth
5 March	Milano–Torino	Italy	1.HC	Fabio Sacchi (ITA)	Fassa Bortolo
6 March	Les Monts Luberon	France	1.2	Florent Brard (FRA)	Agritubel–Loudun
6 March	Trofeo Zsšdi	Italy	1.2	Maurizio Biondo (ITA)	GS Promosport
6 March	Grand Prix de la Ville de Lillers	France	1.2	Johan Coenen (BEL)	Mr Bookmaker.com-Sports Tech
6 March	GP Knorr	Switzerland	1.2	Mauro Santambrogio (ITA)	LPR–Piacenza
7 March	Giro della Provincia di Lucca	Italy	1.1	Mario Cipollini (ITA)	Liquigas–Bianchi
10–13 March	GP do Oeste	Portugal	2.2	Cândido Barbosa (POR)	LA Aluminios / Liberty Seguros
11–14 March	Istrian Spring Trophy	Croatia	2.2	Borut Božič (SLO)	Perutnina Ptuj
13 March	Paris–Troyes	France	1.2	Florent Brard (FRA)	Agritubel–Loudun
13 March	Poreč Trophy	Croatia	1.2	Jochen Summer (AUT)	Elk Haus–Simplon
13 March	Omloop van het Waasland	Belgium	1.2	Gorik Gardeyn (BEL)	Mr Bookmaker.com-Sports Tech
13 March	Trofeo Franco Balestra	Italy	1.2	Branislau Samoilau (BLR)	Palazzago AB Isolanti
13 March	Bordeaux-Saintes	France	1.2	John Nilsson (SWE)	Auber 93
13 March	Giro del Mendrisiotto	Switzerland	1.2	Michele Maccanti (ITA)	LPR–Piacenza
16 March	Nokere Koerse	Belgium	1.1	Steven de Jongh (NED)	Rabobank
18 March	Classic Loire Atlantique	France	1.1	José Alberto Martínez (ESP)	Agritubel–Loudun
20 March	Cholet-Pays de la Loire	France	1.1	Pierrick Fédrigo (FRA)	Bouygues Télécom
20 March	GP San Giuseppe	Italy	1.2	Martin Pedersen (DEN)	Team GLS
20 March	Grand Prix Rudy Dhaenens	Belgium	1.1	Koen Barbé (BEL)	Chocolade Jacques–T Interim
20 March	Stausee Rundfahrt	Switzerland	1.1	Danilo Napolitano (ITA)	LPR–Piacenza
20 March	La Roue Tourangelle	France	1.2	Gilles Canouet (FRA)	Agritubel–Loudun
21–25 March	Setmana Catalana de Ciclisme	Spain	2.HC	Alberto Contador (ESP)	Liberty Seguros–Würth
21–27 March	Tour de Normandie	France	2.2	Kai Reus (NED)	Rabobank Continental Team
22–26 March	Settimana Internazionale di Coppi e Bartali	Italy	2.1	Franco Pellizotti (ITA)	Liquigas–Bianchi
23 March	Dwars door Vlaanderen	Belgium	1.1	Niko Eeckhout (BEL)	Chocolade Jacques–T Interim
23 March	GP Waregem	Belgium	1.2	Romain Fondard (FRA)	VC Roubaix
25–29 March	The Paths of King Nikola	Serbia and Montenegro	2.2	Mitja Mahorič (SLO)	Perutnina Ptuj
26 March	E3 Prijs Vlaanderen – Harelbeke	Belgium	1.HC	Tom Boonen (BEL)	Quick-Step–Innergetic
26–27 March	Critérium International	France	2.HC	Bobby Julich (USA)	Team CSC
27 March	Brabantse Pijl	Belgium	1.HC	Óscar Freire (ESP)	Rabobank
28 March	Giro della Provincia di Reggio Calabria	Italy	1.1	Guillermo Bongiorno (ARG)	Ceramica Panaria–Navigare
28 March	Rund um Köln	Germany	1.1	David Kopp (GER)	Team Wiesenhof
28 March	Giro del Belvedere	Italy	1.2U	Gianluca Coletta (ITA)	Concrete San Marco Caneva
29 March	Paris–Camembert	France	1.1	Laurent Brochard (FRA)	Bouygues Télécom
29 March	GP Palio del Recioto	Italy	1.2U	Andrei Kunitski (BLR)	Palazzago AB Isolanti
29–31 March	Three Days of De Panne	Belgium	2.HC	Stijn Devolder (BEL)	Discovery Channel
1 April	Route Adélie de Vitré	France	1.1	Daniele Contrini (ITA)	LPR–Piacenza
1–3 April	Le Triptyque des Monts et Châteaux	Belgium	2.2	Marc De Maar (NED)	Rabobank Continental Team
2 April	Hel van het Mergelland	Netherlands	1.1	Nico Sijmens (BEL)	Landbouwkrediet–Colnago
2 April	Boucle de l'Artois	France	1.2	Jérôme Bouchet (FRA)	VC Roubaix
2 April	GP Miguel Induráin	Spain	1.1	Javier Pascual Rodríguez (ESP)	Comunidad Valenciana
3 April	Archer GP	United Kingdom	1.2	John Tanner (GBR)	Planet X-Cycling Plus
3 April	Tour du Lac Léman	Switzerland	1.2	Jonas Ljungblad (SWE)	Amore & Vita–Beretta
3 April	GP de la Ville de Rennes	France	1.1	Ludovic Turpin (FRA)	AG2R Prévoyance
5–8 April	Circuit de la Sarthe	France	2.1	Sylvain Chavanel (FRA)	Cofidis
6–10 April	Cinturón a Mallorca	Spain	2.2	Dmitriy Kozontchuk (RUS)	Rabobank Continental Team
6–10 April	Settimana Lombarda	Italy	2.2	Riccardo Riccò (ITA)	Grassi–Marco Pantani
7 April	Grand Prix Pino Cerami	Belgium	1.1	Kai Reus (NED)	Rabobank Continental Team
8–10 April	Circuit des Ardennes	France	2.2	Florian Morizot (FRA)	UV Aube
9 April	Ronde van Drenthe	Netherlands	1.1	Marcel Sieberg (GER)	Team Lamonta
10 April	Klasika Primavera	Spain	1.1	David Etxebarria (ESP)	Liberty Seguros–Würth
10 April	GP de la Ville de Nogent-sur-Oise	France	1.2	Tristan Valentin (FRA)	Auber 93
13 April	Scheldeprijs	Belgium	1.HC	Thorwald Veneberg (NED)	Rabobank
13 April	La Côte Picarde	France	1.2	Jean-Marc Marino (FRA)	UC Châteauroux
13–17 April	Vuelta a Aragón	Spain	2.1	Rubén Plaza (ESP)	Comunidad Valenciana
13–17 April	Tour du Loir-et-Cher	France	2.2	Marc De Maar (NED)	Rabobank Continental Team
14 April	Grand Prix de Denain	France	1.1	Jimmy Casper (FRA)	Cofidis
15 April	Veenendaal–Veenendaal	Netherlands	1.HC	Paul Van Schalen (NED)	AXA Pro-Cycling Team
15–17 April	Tour Nord-Isère	France	2.2	Maint Berkenbosch (NED)	Trientalis-Apac Team
16 April	Tour du Finistère	France	1.1	Simon Gerrans (AUS)	AG2R Prévoyance
17 April	Giro d'Oro	Italy	1.1	Luca Mazzanti (ITA)	Ceramica Panaria–Navigare
17 April	Rund um Düren	Germany	1.2	Robert Retschke (GER)	Team ComNet-Senges
17 April	Tro-Bro Léon	France	1.1	Tristan Valentin (FRA)	Auber 93
18–22 April	Tour of Hellas	Greece	2.2	Valeriy Dmitriyev (KAZ)	Kazakhstan (national team)
19–22 April	Giro del Trentino	Italy	2.1	Julio Alberto Pérez (MEX)	Ceramica Panaria–Navigare
20–24 April	Niedersachsen-Rundfahrt	Germany	2.1	Stefan Schumacher (GER)	Shimano-Memory Corp
20–24 April	Vuelta a Extremadura	Spain	2.2	Luis Roberto Alvarez (ESP)	Cropusa Burgos
21–24 April	Szlakiem Grodów Piastowskich	Poland	2.2	Zbigniew Piątek (POL)	Intel–Action
22–24 April	Vuelta a La Rioja	Spain	2.1	Javier Pascual Rodríguez (ESP)	Comunidad Valenciana
23–27 April	GP of Sochi	Russia	2.2	Alexander Khatuntsev (RUS)	Omnibike Dynamo Moscow
24 April	Giro dell'Appennino	Italy	1.1	Gilberto Simoni (ITA)	Lampre–Caffita
24 April	Paris–Mantes-en-Yvelines	France	1.2	Maxime Mederel (FRA)	Auber 93
24 April	Ronde van Noord-Holland	Netherlands	1.1	Paul Van Schalen (NED)	AXA Pro-Cycling Team
24 April	Berner Rundfahrt	Switzerland	1.1	René Weissinger (GER)	Volksbank-Ideal
24 April	Ronde Van Vlaanderen Beloften	Belgium	1.2	Kenny Dehaes (BEL)	Amuzza.com-DAVO
25 April	Gran Premio della Liberazione	Italy	1.2	Chris Sutton (AUS)	Australia (national team)
25 April	Giro della Provincia di Biella	Italy	1.2	Denis Shkarpeta (UZB)	Ceramica Pagnoncelli
25 April–1 May	Ruban Granitier Breton	France	2.2	Stéphane Pétilleau (FRA)	Bretagne–Jean Floc'h
26 April–1 May	Giro delle Regioni	Italy	2.2	Luigi Sestili (ITA)	Italy (national team)
27–30 April	Circuit de Lorraine	France	2.1	Andris Naudužs (LAT)	Naturino–Sapore di Mare
27 April – 1 May	Vuelta a Castilla y León	Spain	2.1	Carlos García Quesada (ESP)	Comunidad Valenciana
30 April	Grand Prix Herning	Denmark	1.1	Michael Blaudzun (DEN)	Team CSC
30 April	GP Industria & Artigianato di Larciano	Italy	1.1	Luca Mazzanti (ITA)	Ceramica Panaria–Navigare
1 May	CSC Classic	Denmark	1.1	Jacob Moe Rasmussen (DEN)	Team GLS
1 May	Trophée des Grimpeurs	France	1.1	Philippe Gilbert (BEL)	Française des Jeux
1 May	Giro della Toscana	Italy	1.1	Daniele Bennati (ITA)	Lampre–Caffita
1 May	Rund um den Henninger Turm	Germany	1.HC	Erik Zabel (GER)	T-Mobile Team
1 May	Memoriał Andrzeja Trochanowskiego	Poland	1.2	František Raboň (CZE)	PSK Whirlpool
1 May	Grote 1-MeiPrijs	Belgium	1.2	Hamish Haynes (GBR)	Team Cyclingnews.com
1 May	Liège–Bastogne–Liège Espoirs	Belgium	1.2	Martin Pedersen (DEN)	Team GLS
1–8 May	Presidential Cycling Tour of Turkey	Turkey	2.2	Svetoslav Tchanliev (BUL)	Burgas
2 May	GP of Moscow	Russia	1.2	Alexey Shmidt (RUS)	Omnibike Dynamo Moscow
2–5 May	UNIQA Classic	Austria	2.1	Bram de Groot (NED)	Rabobank
3 May	Coppa Città di Asti	Italy	1.2	Fabio Sabatini (ITA)	Pedale Larigiano
3 May	Majowy Wyścig Klasyczny–Lublin	Poland	1.2	Cezary Zamana (POL)	Intel–Action
3 May	Mayor Cup	Russia	1.2	Ivan Terenine (RUS)	Omnibike Dynamo Moscow
4–8 May	Four Days of Dunkirk	France	2.HC	Pierrick Fédrigo (FRA)	Bouygues Télécom
5 May	Neuseen Classics	Germany	1.2	Marek Maciejewski (POL)	Grupa PSB-Atlas-Orbea
5–8 May	Flèche du Sud	Luxembourg	2.2	Wolfram Wiese (GER)	Team ComNet-Senges
5–9 May	Five Rings of Moscow	Russia	2.2	Eduard Vorganov (RUS)	Omnibike Dynamo Moscow
7 May	Ronde van Overijssel	Netherlands	1.2	Arno Wallaard (NED)	Cycling Team Bert Story–Piels
7–8 May	Clasica Alcobendas	Spain	2.1	Pavel Tonkov (RUS)	LPR–Piacenza
7–15 May	Thüringen Rundfahrt der U23	Germany	2.2	Kai Reus (NED)	Rabobank Continental Team
8 May	Lincoln Grand Prix	United Kingdom	1.2	Russell Downing (GBR)	Recycling.co.uk-MG-XPower-Litespeed
8 May	Omloop der Kempen	Netherlands	1.2	Niki Terpstra (NED)	AXA Pro-Cycling Team
8 May	Trofeo Alcide Degasperi	Italy	1.2	David Garbelli (ITA)	Concrete San Marco Caneva
8 May	GP Industrie del Marmo	Italy	1.2	Alessio Signego (ITA)	Promo Ciclo Publysport
11 May	Memorial Oleg Dyachenko	Russia	1.2	Maxim Karpatchev (RUS)	Omnibike Dynamo Moscow
11–15 May	Rheinland-Pfalz Rundfahrt	Germany	2.1	Michael Rich (GER)	Gerolsteiner
12–15 May	GP Sunny Beach	Bulgaria	2.2	Evgeni Gerganov (BUL)	Bulgaria (national team)
13–15 May	Tour de Picardie	France	2.1	Janek Tombak (EST)	Cofidis
13–16 May	Tour de Berlin	Germany	2.2	Dominique Cornu (BEL)	Bodysol-Win for Life-Jong Vlaanderen
14–22 May	Olympia's Tour	Netherlands	2.2	Stef Clement (NED)	Rabobank Continental Team
15 May	Circuito del Porto	Italy	1.2	Maximiliano Richeze (ARG)	Team Parolin Sorelle Ramonda
16 May	GP de Villers-Cotterêts	France	1.1	Bradley McGee (AUS)	Française des Jeux
19–22 May	Ronde de l'Isard	France	2.2	Eduardo Gonzalo (ESP)	FC Barcelona
21 May	Clásica Memorial Txuma	Spain	1.2	Nikolai Trussov (RUS)	Lokomotiv
22 May	Tour de Vendée	France	1.1	Jonas Ljungblad (SWE)	Amore & Vita–Beretta
22–29 May	FBD Insurance Ras	Ireland	2.2	Chris Newton (GBR)	Recycling.co.uk–MG X-Power
24–29 May	Vuelta a Navarra	Spain	2.2	Pavel Brutt (RUS)	Lokomotiv
25–29 May	Tour of Belgium	Belgium	2.1	Tom Boonen (BEL)	Quick-Step–Innergetic
25–29 May	Volta ao Alentejo	Portugal	2.1	Xavier Tondó (ESP)	Catalunya-Angel Mir
25–29 May	Bayern Rundfahrt	Germany	2.HC	Michael Rich (GER)	Gerolsteiner
25–29 May	Tour de Gironde	France	2.2	Charles Guilbert (FRA)	Bretagne–Jean Floc'h
27 May	Tartu GP	Estonia	1.1	Tomas Vaitkus (LTU)	AG2R Prévoyance
27 May	GP Jamp	Slovakia	1.2	Andrey Mizurov (KAZ)	Cycling Team Capec
27 May	Tallinn–Tartu GP	Estonia	1.1	Janek Tombak (EST)	Cofidis
28 May	GP Kooperativa	Slovakia	1.2	Piotr Przydział (POL)	DHL–Author
28 May	GP Möbel Alvisse	Luxembourg	1.2	James Lewis Perry (RSA)	Team Konica Minolta
29 May	GP Llodio	Germany	1.1	David Herrero (ESP)	Euskaltel–Euskadi
29 May	GP Palma	Slovakia	1.2	Oleksandr Klymenko (UKR)	Grupa PSB-Atlas-Orbea
29 May	GP des Eaux Minérales de Beckerich	Luxembourg	1.2	Arno Wallaard (NED)	Cycling Team Bert Story – Piels
29 May	Paris–Roubaix Espoirs	France	1.2	Dmitriy Kozontchuk (RUS)	Rabobank Continental Team
1–5 June	Euskal Bizikleta	Spain	2.HC	Eladio Jiménez (ESP)	Comunidad Valenciana
2–5 June	Tour de Luxembourg	Luxembourg	2.HC	László Bodrogi (HUN)	Crédit Agricole
4 June	GP Schwarzwald	Germany	1.1	Fabian Wegmann (GER)	Gerolsteiner
5 June	Grand Prix of Aargau Canton	Switzerland	1.1	Alexandre Moos (SUI)	Phonak
5 June	Memorial Van Coningsloo	Belgium	1.2	Hans Dekkers (NED)	Rabobank Continental Team
5 June	Coppa della Pace	Italy	1.2	Vasil Kiryienka (BLR)	Grassi–Marco Pantani
5 June	GP Kranj	Slovenia	1.1	Martin Hvastija (SLO)	Perutnina Ptuj
6–11 June	Volta a Lleida	Spain	2.2	Branislau Samoilau (BLR)	Palazzago–Abi Isolanti
7–12 June	Bałtyk–Karkonosze Tour	Poland	2.2	Radosław Romanik (POL)	DHL–Author
8–12 June	Ringerike GP	Norway	2.2	Are Andresen (NOR)	Team Sparebanken Vest
9–12 June	Tour of Slovenia	Slovenia	2.1	Przemysław Niemiec (POL)	Miche
10–12 June	GP CTT Correios	Portugal	2.1	Alexei Markov (RUS)	Milaneza-Maia
12 June	Flèche Hesbignonne	Belgium	1.2	Geert Verheyen (BEL)	Landbouwkrediet–Colnago
14–19 June	Tour de Serbie	Yugoslavia	2.2	Matija Kvasina (CRO)	Perutnina Ptuj
15 June	Subida al Naranco	Spain	1.1	Rinaldo Nocentini (ITA)	Acqua & Sapone–Adria Mobil
15–18 June	Ster Elektrotoer	Netherlands	2.1	Stefan Schumacher (GER)	Shimano–Memory Corp
15–21 June	Circuito Montañés	Spain	2.2	Sergio Domínguez (ESP)	Spiuk
16–19 June	Route du Sud	France	2.1	Sandy Casar (FRA)	Française des Jeux
16–19 June	Mainfranken-Tour	Germany	2.2	Mathieu Ladagnous (FRA)	France (national team)
16–19 June	Boucles de la Mayenne	France	2.2	Aleksandr Kuschynski (BLR)	Amore & Vita–Beretta
17–21 June	Vuelta a Asturias	Spain	2.1	Adolfo García Quesada (ESP)	Comunidad Valenciana
19 June	GP Judendorf-Strassengel	Austria	1.2	Krzysztof Ciesielski (POL)	DHL–Author
19 June	Flèche Ardennaise	Belgium	1.2	Francis De Greef (BEL)	Bodysol-Win for Life-Jong Vlaanderen
22 June	Halle–Ingooigem	Belgium	1.1	Bert Roesems (BEL)	Davitamon–Lotto
22 June	Noord-Nederland Tour	Netherlands	1.1	Stefan van Dijk (NED)	Mr Bookmaker.com-Sports Tech
26 June	Giro delle Valli Aretine	Italy	1.2	Gianluca Moi (ITA)	Palazzago–Abi Isolanti
28 June	Trofeo Città di Brescia	Italy	1.2	Matteo Bono (ITA)	Egidio Unidelta
29 June	I.W.T. Jong Maar Moedig	Belgium	1.2	Gert Vanderaerden (BEL)	Colba-Telecom Cycling Team
29 June–3 July	Course de la Solidarité Olympique	Poland	2.1	Piotr Wadecki (POL)	Intel–Action
2 July	Cronoscalata Gardone Valtrompia	Italy	1.2	Branislau Samoilau (BLR)	Belarus (national team)
2 July	Tour du Jura	Switzerland	1.2	Glen Chadwick (NZL)	Team Cyclingnews.com
3 July	Tour du Doubs	France	1.1	Philip Deignan (IRL)	AG2R Prévoyance
3 July	Trofeo Matteotti	Italy	1.1	Ruggero Marzoli (ITA)	Acqua & Sapone–Adria Mobil
3 July	Freccia dei Vini	Italy	1.2	Maurizio Bellin (ITA)	GS Podenzano
4 July	Chieti-Casalincontrada-Blockhaus	Italy	1.2	Paul Crake (AUS)	Corratec-Graz-Cyl
4–10 July	Tour of Austria	Austria	2.1	Juan Miguel Mercado (ESP)	Quick-Step–Innergetic
6–10 July	GP Torres Vedras	Portugal	2.1	Gerardo Fernández (ARG)	Paredes Rota dos Moveis–Beira Tamega
7–9 July	GP de Gemenc	Hungary	2.2	Martin Prázdnovský (SVK)	CK ZP Sport A.S. Podbrezova
8 July	European Road Championships (U23) – Time Trial	Russia	CC	Dmytro Grabovskyy (UKR)	Ukraine (national team)
9 July	Giro della Valsesia 1	Italy	1.2	Simone Bruson (ITA)	GS Podenzano
10 July	GP de Dourges	France	1.2	Grzegorz Kwiatkowski (POL)	EC Raismes
10 July	De Drie Zustersteden	Belgium	1.2	Peter Wuyts (BEL)	Mr Bookmaker.com-Sports Tech
10 July	Giro della Valsesia 2	Italy	1.2	Piergiorgio Camussa (ITA)	Progetto Ciclismo Alplast
10 July	Giro del Medio Brenta	Italy	1.2	Manuele Spadi (ITA)	Ceramica Flaminia
10 July	Pomorski Klasyk	Poland	1.2	Piotr Wadecki (POL)	Intel–Action
10 July	European Road Championships (U23) – Road Race	Russia	CC	František Raboň (CZE)	Czech Republic (national team)
16 July	Trofeo Piva	Italy	1.2	Marco Vivian (ITA)	U.C. Trevigiani–Dynamon
17 July	Giro del Casentino	Italy	1.2	Vasil Kiryienka (BLR)	Grassi–Marco Pantani
17 July	Coppa Colli Briantei	Italy	1.2	Harald Starzengruber (AUT)	U.C. Trevigiani–Dynamon
20–24 July	Sachsen Tour	Germany	2.1	Mathew Hayman (AUT)	Rabobank
22–24 July	Brixia Tour	Italy	2.1	Emanuele Sella (ITA)	Ceramica Panaria–Navigare
23 July	GP Bradlo	Slovakia	1.2	Martin Riška (SVK)	PSK Whirlpool
24 July	Grand Prix de la ville de Pérenchies	France	1.2	Aivaras Baranauskas (LTU)	Roubaix-Lille Metropole
24 July	GP Inda	Italy	1.2	Daniele Di Nucci (ITA)	Grassi–Marco Pantani
25 July	Prueba Villafranca de Ordizia	Spain	1.1	Carlos García Quesada (ESP)	Comunidad Valenciana
25–29 July	Tour de Wallonie	Belgium	2.HC	Luca Celli (ITA)	Team Barloworld-Valsir
26–30 July	Dookoła Mazowsza	Poland	2.1	Piotr Zaradny (POL)	Knauf Team
30 July	LUK Challenge Chrono Bühl	Germany	1.1	Bobby Julich (USA); Jens Voigt (GER)	Team CSC
31 July	Circuito de Getxo	Spain	1.1	David Fernández (ESP)	Andalucía–Paul Versan
31 July	La Poly Normande	France	1.1	Philippe Gilbert (BEL)	Française des Jeux
2–4 August	Paris–Corrèze	France	2.1	Frédéric Finot (FRA)	Française des Jeux
2–6 August	Vuelta a León	Spain	2.2	Enrique Salgueiro (ESP)	Spiuk
3–7 August	Danmark Rundt	Denmark	2.HC	Ivan Basso (ITA)	Team CSC
4 August	Gran Premio Città di Camaiore	Italy	1.1	Maxim Iglinskiy (KAZ)	Domina Vacanze
4–7 August	Tour of Małopolska	Poland	2.2	Cezary Zamana (POL)	Intel–Action
5–15 August	Volta a Portugal	Portugal	2.HC	Vladimir Efimkin (RUS)	Team Barloworld-Valsir
5–14 August	Tour de Guadeloupe	France	2.2	Flober Peña (COL)	L. Optiq-F. Telecom
6 August	Giro del Lazio	Italy	1.HC	Filippo Pozzato (ITA)	Quick-Step–Innergetic
7 August	Sparkassen Giro	Germany	1.1	Lubor Tesař (CZE)	Akud Arnolds Sicherheit
7–10 August	Tour de l'Ain	France	2.1	Carl Naibo (FRA)	Bretagne–Jean Floc'h
7–11 August	Vuelta a Burgos	Spain	2.HC	Juan Carlos Domínguez (ESP)	Saunier Duval–Prodir
9 August	GP Fred Mengoni	Italy	1.1	Luca Mazzanti (ITA)	Ceramica Panaria–Navigare
10 August	Trofeo Città di Castelfidardo	Italy	1.1	Murilo Fischer (BRA)	Naturino–Sapore di Mare
10–14 August	Regio-Tour	Germany	2.1	Nico Sijmens (BEL)	Landbouwkrediet–Colnago
13 August	Puchar Uzdrowisk Karpackich	Poland	1.2	Radosław Romanik (POL)	DHL–Author
13 August	Rund um die Hainleite	Germany	1.1	Bert Grabsch (GER)	Phonak
13 August	GP Città di Felino	Italy	1.2	Matteo Priamo (ITA)	GS Promosport
14 August	Memoriał Henryka Łasaka	Poland	1.1	Marek Maciejewski (POL)	Grupa PSB-Atlas-Orbea
14 August	Subida a Urkiola	Spain	1.1	Joaquim Rodríguez (ESP)	Saunier Duval–Prodir
14 August	Trofeo Bastianelli	Italy	1.2	Davide Torosantucci (ITA)	Monturano
14 August	Scandinavian Open Road Race	Sweden	1.2	Christofer Stevenson (SWE)	Mälarenergi CK
14 August	Havant GP	United Kingdom	1.2	Russell Downing (GBR)	Recycling.co.uk–MG X-Power
15 August	Puchar Ministra Obrony Narodowej	Poland	1.2	Gregorz Zoledziowski (POL)	Legia–Bazyliszek
16 August	Tre Valli Varesine	Italy	1.HC	Stefano Garzelli (ITA)	Liquigas–Bianchi
16 August	GP Capodarco	Italy	1.2	Fernando Herrero (ESP)	Viña Magna–Cropusa
16–19 August	Tour du Limousin	France	2.1	Sébastien Joly (FRA)	Crédit Agricole
17 August	Coppa Ugo Agostoni	Italy	1.1	Paolo Valoti (ITA)	Domina Vacanze
17 August	Gara Ciclistica Milionaria	Italy	1.2	Davide Torosantucci (ITA)	Monturano
18 August	Coppa Bernocchi	Italy	1.1	Danilo Napolitano (ITA)	LPR–Piacenza
20 August	Tour de Rijke	Netherlands	1.1	Stefan van Dijk (NED)	Mr Bookmaker.com-Sports Tech
20 August	Giro del Veneto	Italy	1.HC	Eddy Mazzoleni (ITA)	Lampre–Caffita
20 August	Szlakiem Walk Majora Hubala	Poland	1.2	Tomasz Kiendyś (POL)	Knauf Team
20 August	GP Area Metropolitana de Vigo	Spain	1.2	Francisco García (ESP)	Paredes Rota dos Moveis–Beira Tamega
21 August	Clásica a los Puertos	Spain	1.1	Xabier Zandio (ESP)	Illes Balears–Caisse d'Epargne
21 August	GP Ciudad de Vigo	Spain	1.2	José Carlos Rodrigues (POR)	Paredes Rota dos Moveis–Beira Tamega
21 August	Châteauroux Classic	France	1.1	Jimmy Casper (FRA)	Cofidis
23 August	Grote Prijs Stad Zottegem	Belgium	1.1	Thomas Dekker (NED)	Rabobank
23–26 August	Tour du Poitou Charentes et de la Vienne	France	2.1	Sylvain Chavanel (FRA)	Cofidis
24 August	Druivenkoers Overijse	Belgium	1.1	Leonardo Duque (COL)	Jartazi–Revor
24 August	Gran Premio Nobili Rubinetterie	Italy	1.1	Damiano Cunego (ITA)	Lampre–Caffita
25 August	Gran Premio Industria e Commercio Artigianato Carnaghese	Italy	1.1	Simon Gerrans (AUS)	AG2R Prévoyance
28 August	Rund um den Sachsenring	Germany	1.2	Karsten Volkmann (GER)	RSH
29 August	GP de Beuvry-la-Forêt	France	1.2	Maint Berkenbosch (NED)	Trientalis-Apac Team
30 August	Schaal Sels	Belgium	1.1	Marcin Sapa (POL)	Knauf Team
30 August–4 September	Tour of Britain	United Kingdom	2.1	Nick Nuyens (BEL)	Quick-Step–Innergetic
30 August–4 September	Giro della Valle d'Aosta	Italy	2.2	Morris Possoni (ITA)	Unidelta Egidio Colibrì Garda
31 August–4 September	Hessen-Rundfahrt	Germany	2.1	Cezary Zamana (POL)	DHL–Author
31 August–4 September	Tour de Slovaquie	Slovakia	2.2	Martin Prázdnovský (SVK)	CK ZP Sport A.S. Podbrezova
1 September	Trofeo Melinda	Italy	1.1	Damiano Cunego (ITA)	Lampre–Caffita
1–10 September	Tour de l'Avenir	France	2.1	Lars Bak (DEN)	Team CSC
2–4 September	Stuttgart–Strasbourg	Germany	2.2	Michael Muck (GER)	Team Aguti
3 September	Coppa Placci	Italy	1.HC	Paolo Valoti (ITA)	Domina Vacanze
4 September	Giro della Romagna	Italy	1.1	Danilo Napolitano (ITA)	LPR–Piacenza
4 September	Grote Prijs Jef Scherens	Belgium	1.1	Joost Posthuma (NED)	Rabobank
4 September	Duo Normand	France	1.2	Sylvain Chavanel (FRA); Thierry Marichal (BEL)	Cofidis
7 September	Memorial Rik Van Steenbergen	Belgium	1.1	Jean-Patrick Nazon (FRA)	AG2R Prévoyance
8–11 September	Giro della Toscana	Italy	2.2	Sergey Firsanov (RUS)	Rietumu Banka–Riga
10 September	Paris–Brussels	Belgium	1.HC	Robbie McEwen (AUS)	Davitamon–Lotto
10–16 September	Tour of Bulgaria	Bulgaria	2.2	Martin Prázdnovský (SVK)	Slovakia (national team)
10–11 September	Triptyque des Barrages	Belgium	2.2	Lars Boom (NED)	Rabobank Continental Team
11 September	Rund um die Nürnberger Altstadt	Germany	1.1	Ronny Scholz (GER)	Gerolsteiner
11 September	Grand Prix de Fourmies	France	1.HC	Robbie McEwen (AUS)	Davitamon–Lotto
14 September	Grand Prix de Wallonie	Belgium	1.1	Nick Nuyens (BEL)	Quick-Step–Innergetic
16 September	Kampioenschap van Vlaanderen	Belgium	1.1	Sergey Lagutin (UZB)	Landbouwkrediet–Colnago
16–17 September	GP de la Somme	France	2.2	Erki Pütsep (EST)	AG2R Prévoyance
17 September	Gran Premio Città di Misano – Adriatico	Italy	1.1	Guillermo Bongiorno (ARG)	Ceramica Panaria–Navigare
17 September	Giro del Canavese	Italy	1.2	Oscar Gatto (ITA)	Zalf Désirée Fior
18 September	Chrono Champenois	France	1.2	Mathieu Heijboer (NED)	Rabobank Continental Team
18 September	Gran Premio Industria e Commercio di Prato	Italy	1.1	Murilo Fischer (BRA)	Naturino–Sapore di Mare
18 September	Trofeo Bianchin	Italy	1.2	Matteo Priamo (ITA)	GS Promosport
18 September	Grand Prix d'Isbergues	France	1.1	Niko Eeckhout (BEL)	Chocolade Jacques–T Interim
21 September	Omloop van het Houtland Lichtervelde	Belgium	1.2	Kevin van Impe (BEL)	Chocolade Jacques–T Interim
24 September	Delta Profronde	Netherlands	1.1	Bram de Groot (NED)	Rabobank
27 September	Ruota d'Oro	Italy	1.2	Branislau Samoilau (BLR)	Belarus (national team)
27 September	Omloop van de Vlaamse Scheldeboorden	Belgium	1.1	Niko Eeckhout (BEL)	Chocolade Jacques–T Interim
29 September–2 October	Circuit Franco-Belge	Belgium	2.1	Marco Zanotti (ITA)	Liquigas–Bianchi
1 October	Memorial Cimurri	Italy	1.1	Murilo Fischer (BRA)	Naturino–Sapore di Mare
1 October	Piccolo Giro di Lombardia	Italy	1.2	Ruslan Gryschenko (UKR)	Bottoli Artoni
6 October	Coppa Sabatini	Italy	1.1	Alessandro Bertolini (ITA)	Domina Vacanze
6 October	Paris–Bourges	France	1.1	Lars Bak (DEN)	Team CSC
8 October	Giro dell'Emilia	Italy	1.HC	Gilberto Simoni (ITA)	Lampre–Caffita
9 October	Gran Premio Bruno Beghelli	Italy	1.1	Murilo Fischer (BRA)	Naturino–Sapore di Mare
9 October	Paris–Tours Espoirs	France	1.2	Fabien Patanchon (FRA)	Ent Sud Gascogne
11 October	Nationale Sluitingsprijs	Belgium	1.1	Gert Steegmans (BEL)	Davitamon–Lotto
13 October	Giro del Piemonte	Italy	1.HC	Murilo Fischer (BRA)	Naturino–Sapore di Mare

== Final standings ==
There is a competition for the rider, team and country with the most points gained from winning or achieving a high place in the above races.

=== Individual classification ===
Rank	Name	Points
1	Murilo Fischer (BRA)	748
2	Stefan van Dijk (NED)	503
3	Niko Eeckhout (BEL)	492
4	Ruggero Marzoli (ITA)	456
5	Stefan Schumacher (GER)	441
6	Danilo Napolitano (ITA)	440
7	Luca Mazzanti (ITA)	413
8	Vladimir Efimkin (RUS)	402
9	Paride Grillo (ITA)	357
10	Nico Sijmens (BEL)	356

=== Team classification ===
Rank	Team	Points
1	Ceramica Panaria–Navigare	1847
2	AG2R Prévoyance	1720.2
3	Comunidad Valenciana–Elche	1654.8
4	Barloworld	1494
5	Naturino–Sapore di Mare	1487
6	LPR–Piacenza	1400
7	Rabobank Continental Team	1384
8	MrBookmaker.com–SportsTech	1200
9	Landbouwkrediet–Colnago	1199
10	Intel–Action	1091

=== Nation classification ===
Rank	Nation	Points
1	Italy	2894
2	Spain	2432
3	Netherlands	2135
4	Poland	1973
5	Belgium	1928
6	Russia	1762
7	France	1707
8	Germany	1501
9	Czech Republic	1234
10	Portugal	1168
