= Matteo Carrara =

Italian former racing cyclist

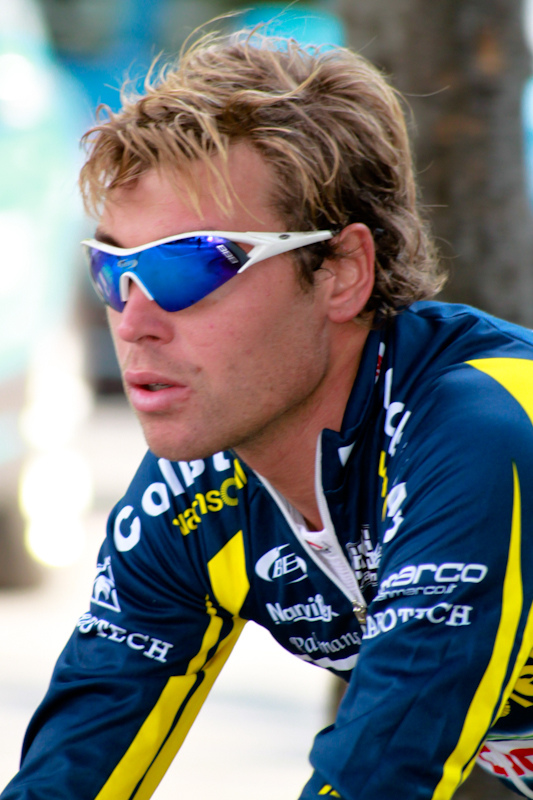

Personal information
- Full name: Matteo Carrara
- Born: 25 March 1979 (age 47) Alzano Lombardo, Italy
- Height: 1.80 m (5 ft 11 in)
- Weight: 64 kg (141 lb; 10.1 st)

Cycling career
- Sport: Cycling
- Discipline: Road
- Role: Rider

Professional teams
- 2001–2002: Team Colpack–Astro
- 2003: De Nardi-Colpack
- 2004: Lampre
- 2005: Barloworld
- 2006: Lampre–Fondital
- 2007: Unibet.com
- 2008: Quick-Step
- 2009–2012: Vacansoleil

Matteo Carrara (born 25 March 1979 in Alzano Lombardo) is an Italian former racing cyclist, who rode as a professional between 2001 and 2012. Carrara's greatest victory came at the 2019 Tour de Luxembourg where he won the overall. In 2010 Carrara won stage 4 of Settimana Ciclistica Lombarda however, he was relegated due to irregular sprinting and the win was given to José Serpa.

== Major results ==
2000
1st Giro del Medio Brenta
3rd Gran Premio Industria e Commercio Artigianato Carnaghese
4th Rund um die Nürnberger Altstadt
2001
5th Rund um die Nürnberger Altstadt
9th Gran Premio Bruno Beghelli
2002
7th Overall Giro della Provincia di Lucca
2003
1st Criterium d'Abruzzo
4th Overall UNIQA Classic
5th Trofeo Matteotti
10th Grand Prix de Fourmies
Tour of Qinghai Lake

1st Stages 2 & 5
1st Points classification

Tour of Austria

1st Stage 5
1st Points classification

2004
2nd Criterium d'Abruzzo
3rd Gran Premio de Llodio
4th Giro della Toscana
5th Trofeo Matteotti
2005
3rd Overall Tour of Japan
3rd Urkiola Igoera
6th Ronde van Drenthe
8th Coppa Bernocchi
2006
2nd Memorial Cimurri
5th Grand Prix Chiasso
6th Giro di Lombardia
8th Coppa Sabatini
9th Brabantse Pijl
10th Milan–San Remo
2007
3rd Overall Brixia Tour
4th Overall Euskal Bizikleta
4th Overall Tour de Suisse
5th Overall Vuelta a La Rioja
8th Coppa Ugo Agostoni
2008
10th Overall Critérium du Dauphiné Libéré
2009
1st Overall Circuit de Lorraine
5th Overall Settimana Ciclistica Lombarda
5th Cholet-Pays De Loire
6th Overall Tour de Luxembourg
6th Paris–Camembert
7th Eschborn-Frankfurt City Loop
2010
1st Overall Tour de Luxembourg
3rd Overall Circuit de Lorraine
5th Overall Settimana Ciclistica Lombarda
6th Overall Four Days of Dunkirk
9th Overall Brixia Tour
2012
8th Overall Volta a Catalunya

=== Grand Tour general classification results timeline ===
Grand Tour	2001	2002	2003	2004	2005	2006	2007	2008	2009	2010	2011	2012
Giro d'Italia	111	81	DNF	—	—	—	—	—	—	—	16	96
Tour de France	—	—	—	—	—	—	—	34	—	—	—	—
/ Vuelta a España	—	—	—	—	—	DNF	—	—	37	—	146	—

Legend
—	Did not compete
DNF	Did not finish
