= 2012 Volta a Catalunya =

2012 UCI World Tour, race 5 of 28
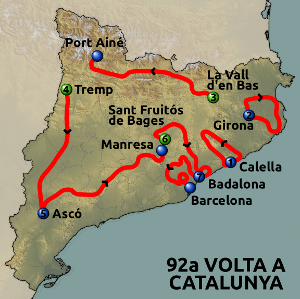
- The route of the 2012 Volta a Catalunya

Race details
- Dates: 19–25 March 2012
- Stages: 6 (Note: The Volta a Catalunya was reduced from 7 stages over 1,206.1 kilometres (749.4 mi) due to the shortening – and later neutralising of the results – of Stage 3.)
- Distance: 995.2 km (618.4 mi)
- Winning time: 24h 15' 45"

Results
Jersey awarded to the overall winner	Winner	Michael Albasini (Switzerland)	(GreenEDGE)
	Second	Samuel Sánchez (Spain)	(Euskaltel–Euskadi)
	Third	Jurgen Van den Broeck (Belgium)	(Lotto–Belisol)
Jersey awarded to the mountains classification winner	Mountains	Chris Anker Sørensen (Denmark)	(Team Saxo Bank)
Jersey awarded to the sprints classification winner	Sprints	Tomasz Marczyński (Poland)	(Vacansoleil–DCM)
	Team	Garmin–Barracuda	

The 2012 Volta a Catalunya was the 92nd running of the Volta a Catalunya cycling stage race. It started on 19 March in Calella and ended on 25 March in Barcelona, and consisted of seven stages. It was the fifth race of the 2012 UCI World Tour season.

The race was won by Switzerland's Michael Albasini of GreenEDGE, after winning the first two stages of the race and maintained his advantage all the way to the end of the race. Albasini won the general classification by 90 seconds over runner-up Samuel Sánchez of the Euskaltel–Euskadi team. Third place was taken by Lotto–Belisol's Jurgen Van den Broeck, after thirteen riders finished the race with a deficit of 92 seconds to Albasini; Van Den Broeck recorded the lowest cumulative score for his stage positions, and as a result, was placed highest of the group of riders. In the race's other classifications, Tomasz Marczyński of Vacansoleil–DCM won the white jersey for the most points gained in intermediate sprints, while Team Saxo Bank rider Chris Anker Sørensen won the King of the Mountains classification, and Garmin–Barracuda finished at the head of the teams classification.

== Teams ==
As the Volta a Catalunya was a UCI World Tour event, all 18 UCI ProTeams were invited automatically and obligated to send a squad. Five other squads were given wildcard places into the race, and as such, formed the event's 23-team peloton.

The 23 teams that competed in the race were:

- Ag2r–La Mondiale
- Astana
- BMC Racing Team
- Euskaltel–Euskadi
- FDJ–BigMat
- Garmin–Barracuda
- GreenEDGE
- Team Katusha
- Lampre–ISD
- Liquigas–Cannondale
- Lotto–Belisol
- Movistar Team
- Omega Pharma–Quick-Step
- Rabobank
- RadioShack–Nissan
- Team Saxo Bank
- Team Sky
- Vacansoleil–DCM
- Andalucía
- Caja Rural
- Cofidis
- Project 1t4i
- Saur–Sojasun

== Route ==
Stage characteristics and winners
Stage	Date	Course	Distance	Type	Winner
1	19 March	Calella to Calella	138.9 km (86.3 mi)		Michael Albasini (SUI)
2	20 March	Girona to Girona	161 km (100.0 mi)		Michael Albasini (SUI)
3	21 March	La Vall d'en Bas to Canturri	154.2 km (95.8 mi)	Mountain stage	Janez Brajkovič (SLO)
4	22 March	Tremp to Ascó	199 km (123.7 mi)		Rigoberto Urán (COL)
5	23 March	Ascó to Manresa	207.1 km (128.7 mi)		Julien Simon (FRA)
6	24 March	Sant Fruitós de Bages to Badalona	169.4 km (105.3 mi)		Samuel Sánchez (ESP)
7	25 March	Badalona to Barcelona	119.8 km (74.4 mi)		Julien Simon (FRA)

== Stages ==
=== Stage 1 ===
19 March 2012 — Calella to Calella, 138.9 km (86.3 mi)

Following an early, yet unsuccessful, attack from Cédric Pineau of FDJ–BigMat, a quintet of riders – GreenEDGE's Michael Albasini, Ag2r–La Mondiale rider Ben Gastauer, Timmy Duggan of Liquigas–Cannondale, Cofidis's Nicolas Edet and Saur–Sojasun rider Anthony Delaplace – made the primary breakaway from the field, just as they moved into the village of Arbúcies for the first intermediate sprint of the race. The five riders managed to extend their advantage over the main field to in excess of six minutes at one point during the stage, which was run in largely dry conditions apart from the second categorised climb – of three during the stage – of the first-category Coll Formic, where the riders were met by wet conditions with hail also falling. The breakaway's advantage had been cut to around three and a half minutes as the main field moved over the climb at Coll Formic, but the quintet managed to put more time into the pack, after their pace relented slightly. Their gap almost topped four minutes once again, before Astana and the Movistar Team forced the cause from the field, and again the time between the groups dwindled.

By the time that the field had reached the final climb of the day, the Alt de Collsacreu. At this moment, Albasini stepped up his pace, soloed off the front of the gruppetto and quickly distanced himself from his four companions, who had split into two groups of two riders. At first, Delaplace and Edet tried to stay with Albasini, but could not; while Duggan and Gastauer decided not to follow the French duo, and would try to fend off the main field if they could. RadioShack–Nissan picked up the reins on the front of the peloton, and looked to close in on Duggan and Gastauer, who had fallen around a minute behind Albasini with around 10 km (6.2 mi) remaining. Albasini remained well clear into Calella and eventually claimed his first victory for the GreenEDGE team, and the team's second in three days after Simon Gerrans' win in Milan–San Remo the previous Saturday. As well as leading the general classification, Albasini held the lead of the mountains classification, after leading over two of the three climbs. Delaplace finished second, 42 seconds in arrears, after dropping Edet in the closing kilometres; Edet finished around half a minute later in third place. The peloton was not far behind; led over the line 18 seconds later by Vacansoleil–DCM's Kenny van Hummel, after Duggan and Gastauer – the only rider to be passed by van Hummel – were caught in the finishing straight.

Stage 1 Result and General Classification after Stage 1

	Rider	Team	Time
1	Michael Albasini (SUI)	GreenEDGE	3h 20' 04"
2	Anthony Delaplace (FRA)	Saur–Sojasun	+ 42"
3	Nicolas Edet (FRA)	Cofidis	+ 1' 14"
4	Kenny van Hummel (NED)	Vacansoleil–DCM	+ 1' 32"
5	Ben Gastauer (LUX)	Ag2r–La Mondiale	+ 1' 32"
6	Roger Kluge (GER)	Project 1t4i	+ 1' 32"
7	Allan Davis (AUS)	GreenEDGE	+ 1' 32"
8	Fabio Sabatini (ITA)	Liquigas–Cannondale	+ 1' 32"
9	Davide Appollonio (ITA)	Team Sky	+ 1' 32"
10	Francesco Gavazzi (ITA)	Astana	+ 1' 32"

=== Stage 2 ===
20 March 2012 — Girona to Girona, 161 km (100.0 mi)

Three riders – Andalucía's Jordi Simón, Caja Rural rider Julián Sánchez and Cyril Bessy of Saur–Sojasun – advanced clear of the main field after 12 km (7.5 mi) of the stage, and managed to extend their advantage to a maximum of over seven minutes at one point during the early running of the stage. Noting the peloton's inability to recapture the entire breakaway on the opening stage, GreenEDGE established themselves on the front of the pack; protecting their overall leader Michael Albasini from losing any potential time on the road. As such, by the time the race had reached the mid-stage feeding area, the trio out front only held a lead of around two minutes over the advancing peloton. Movistar Team's Alejandro Valverde took a tumble as the race was passing through; his front wheel hit a discarded drinks bottle, and crashed into a kerb. He would ultimately lose over two minutes on the day, after failing to make the junction back to the field.

Omega Pharma–Quick-Step then assumed the leadership of the peloton, looking to help with Levi Leipheimer's bid for the overall race as a whole; in a reverse to what occurred at Paris–Nice earlier in the month where Movistar Team initiated the pace when Leipheimer fell three times during the penultimate stage. The breakaway's gap out front quickly dwindled, and were caught with over 40 km (24.9 mi) left to travel in the stage. This allowed for the Alt dels Angels, a first-category climb 14 km (8.7 mi) from the end, to take a greater presence in the stage's running, increasing the chances of riders going off the front to attack. After Leipheimer and Tejay van Garderen (BMC Racing Team) made failed bids to get away, three riders – Lampre–ISD's Damiano Cunego, Garmin–Barracuda rider Dan Martin and Matteo Carrara of Vacansoleil–DCM – went clear on the descent and held station off the front until the closing stages. A reduced peloton contested the sprint in Girona; Bradley Wiggins tried to set the sprint up for his Team Sky team-mate Rigoberto Urán, but Albasini surprised the field by accelerating clear in the finishing straight and picked up his second successive stage victory. Urán finished third behind Omega Pharma–Quick-Step's Dario Cataldo.

Stage 2 result

	Rider	Team	Time
1	Michael Albasini (SUI)	GreenEDGE	3h 52' 07"
2	Dario Cataldo (ITA)	Omega Pharma–Quick-Step	s.t.
3	Rigoberto Urán (COL)	Team Sky	s.t.
4	Damiano Cunego (ITA)	Lampre–ISD	s.t.
5	Ryder Hesjedal (CAN)	Garmin–Barracuda	s.t.
6	Sergio Pardilla (ESP)	Movistar Team	s.t.
7	Arnold Jeannesson (FRA)	FDJ–BigMat	s.t.
8	Alberto Losada (ESP)	Team Katusha	s.t.
9	Richie Porte (AUS)	Team Sky	s.t.
10	Robert Kišerlovski (CRO)	Astana	s.t.

General Classification after Stage 2

	Rider	Team	Time
1	Michael Albasini (SUI)	GreenEDGE	7h 12' 11"
2	Ryder Hesjedal (CAN)	Garmin–Barracuda	+ 1' 32"
3	Mikaël Cherel (FRA)	Ag2r–La Mondiale	+ 1' 32"
4	Steve Morabito (SUI)	BMC Racing Team	+ 1' 32"
5	Arnold Jeannesson (FRA)	FDJ–BigMat	+ 1' 32"
6	Dan Martin (IRL)	Garmin–Barracuda	+ 1' 32"
7	Richie Porte (AUS)	Team Sky	+ 1' 32"
8	Jurgen Van den Broeck (BEL)	Lotto–Belisol	+ 1' 32"
9	Jakob Fuglsang (DEN)	RadioShack–Nissan	+ 1' 32"
10	Damiano Cunego (ITA)	Lampre–ISD	+ 1' 32"

=== Stage 3 ===
21 March 2012 — La Vall d'en Bas to Canturri, 154.2 km (95.8 mi)

Originally scheduled to be held over 210.9 km (131.0 mi) from La Vall d'en Bas to Port Ainé, the race's queen stage was shortened to 154.2 km (95.8 mi) due to snow on the hors-categorie climbs of the Port del Cantó and the finish climb at Port Ainé. As such, both climbs were removed from the itinerary, and the stage finish was moved to Canturri, on the lower slopes of the Port del Cantó. This occurred after the start of the stage, which had commenced in cold, wet conditions; several riders elected not to take the start including Movistar Team's Alejandro Valverde after his stage 2 crash, and Team Saxo Bank rider Daniel Navarro, who had been ill for the previous week. An early crash, inside the opening 10 km (6.2 mi) of the parcours, saw several riders hit the ground, including Liquigas–Cannondale's Ivan Basso, GreenEDGE rider Julian Dean and František Raboň of Omega Pharma–Quick-Step. All three abandoned, with Dean later taken to hospital in Valencia for surgery, after breaking his leg in a collision with a parked car.

The stage's primary breakaway commenced forming at the 17 km (10.6 mi) mark, on the ascent of the first climb, the first-category Alt de Coubet. Team Saxo Bank's Chris Anker Sørensen went clear with BMC Racing Team rider Johann Tschopp before they were joined on the descent by Janez Brajkovič of Astana. This trio were eventually by another nine riders from two distinct groups, with the best-placed of these riders being Mikaël Cherel (Ag2r–La Mondiale) – who after two solid finishes in the opening two stages of the race – in third position in the general classification. The break quickly extended their gap to the main field, reaching a maximum of nigh on eleven minutes at the 123.5 km (76.7 mi) point of the stage. The inclement weather failed to relent, forcing organisers to deploy snow-clearing machinery at the finish, in a bid to run the stage at its full length. Ultimately, their bid to do so was futile as race organisers could not guarantee a safe finish into Port Ainé, a ski station in the Pyrenees. The finish was moved to a point on the lower slopes of Port del Cantó, and thus eliminating any opportunity for the main field to contest for the stage victory; the twelve-man breakaway were just 10 km (6.2 mi) away from the point as the decision was made to do so.

With the finish marked out by just a solitary line on the road, Brajkovič won the sprint for the line ahead of Omega Pharma–Quick-Step rider Michał Gołaś and Matteo Carrara of Vacansoleil–DCM. The peloton came across the line around eight minutes later, having cut into the lead in the false hope that the stage would run its full parcours. Several hours after the stage was completed, it was announced that the timings would not count towards the general classification, but points towards the mountains and sprints classifications would count. This meant that – while losing the lead of the mountains classification to Sørensen – GreenEDGE rider Michael Albasini maintained his 92-second advantage at the head of the race, and also assumed the lead of the sprints classification after previous leader Anthony Delaplace (Saur–Sojasun), like 32 other riders, abandoned during the stage. Among the other abandonments were Bradley Wiggins and Richie Porte of Team Sky, BMC Racing Team rider Tejay van Garderen and RadioShack–Nissan trio Andy Schleck, Ben Hermans and Tiago Machado.

The announcement of neutralising the time gaps came as no surprise to many of the riders and team members. Stage winner Brajkovič described the stage and its conditions as the "hardest day of his life", while runner-up on the day Gołaś noted that it was not until he saw race officials that he knew where the finish of the stage was. Race leader Albasini's team director at GreenEDGE, Neil Stephens, also described the announcement as a fair decision, having encountered a similar situation during the 1995 running of the event, when he was riding for the ONCE team. Fellow team director José Azevedo (RadioShack–Nissan) was more frank with his comments; he expressed dismay at the late nature of being told about the stage's shortening, and anger at other riders for failing to wait for crashed riders in the early stages. The order of riders placed 3rd to 7th were subsequently revised on the UCI's official results service, but as of May 2012 remained unchanged on the event organisers' site.

Stage 3 Result (Note: No official times recorded.)

	Rider	Team
1	Janez Brajkovič (SLO)	Astana
2	Michał Gołaś (POL)	Omega Pharma–Quick-Step
3	Mikaël Cherel (FRA)	Ag2r–La Mondiale
4	Matteo Carrara (ITA)	Vacansoleil–DCM
5	Thomas Rohregger (AUT)	RadioShack–Nissan
6	Chris Anker Sørensen (DEN)	Team Saxo Bank
7	Christian Vande Velde (USA)	Garmin–Barracuda
8	Johann Tschopp (SUI)	BMC Racing Team
9	Steven Kruijswijk (NED)	Rabobank
10	Romain Bardet (FRA)	Ag2r–La Mondiale

General Classification after Stage 3

	Rider	Team	Time
1	Michael Albasini (SUI)	GreenEDGE	7h 12' 12" (Note: A notional increment of one second was added to the overall time of each rider that completed the stage.)
2	Ryder Hesjedal (CAN)	Garmin–Barracuda	+ 1' 32"
3	Mikaël Cherel (FRA)	Ag2r–La Mondiale	+ 1' 32"
4	Steve Morabito (SUI)	BMC Racing Team	+ 1' 32"
5	Arnold Jeannesson (FRA)	FDJ–BigMat	+ 1' 32"
6	Dan Martin (IRL)	Garmin–Barracuda	+ 1' 32"
7	Jurgen Van den Broeck (BEL)	Lotto–Belisol	+ 1' 32"
8	Jakob Fuglsang (DEN)	RadioShack–Nissan	+ 1' 32"
9	Damiano Cunego (ITA)	Lampre–ISD	+ 1' 32"
10	Tom Danielson (USA)	Garmin–Barracuda	+ 1' 32"

=== Stage 4 ===
22 March 2012 — Tremp to Ascó, 199 km (123.7 mi)

Following on from the tumultuous third stage, the fourth stage began without two of the overnight top ten riders in the general classification. Fifth-placed Arnold Jeannesson (FDJ–BigMat) failed to start the stage due to a knee injury, as a result of a crash during the third stage. He was joined on the sidelines by eighth-placed Jakob Fuglsang of RadioShack–Nissan, who fractured his scaphoid on the same stage and as a result had to abandon the race on his 27th birthday. The stage itself was also delayed from its original start time after five teams were snowed in on the Port Ainé, following yesterday's racing. Once the stage commenced, Caja Rural rider Julián Sánchez made it into the breakaway for the second time in three days, with Andalucía represented once again, this time through Jesús Rosendo; and the breakaway was completed by Belgium's Romain Zingle, riding for the Cofidis team.

The breakaway trio's maximum advantage over the main field came early on in the stage; after 17 km (10.6 mi), they held a lead of almost five minutes, but that was quickly whittled down, and by the time the trio entered the finishing circuit in Ascó for the first of two 28 km (17.4 mi) laps – not including the closing 1.7 km (1.1 mi) run-in – the gap was around two-and-a-half minutes. The trio were caught by a gruppetto of around 25 riders in the proximity of the climb of the Coll de Paumeres; Zingle on the ascent, and Rosendo and Sánchez on the descent. After an original move of two riders who tried to go clear after that, Levi Leipheimer of Omega Pharma–Quick-Step and Liquigas–Cannondale's Sylwester Szmyd counter-attacked and went clear. They were joined by four other riders, and pretty much stayed clear to the end; they were caught in the final 500 m (1,600 ft), but Rigoberto Urán (Team Sky), Denis Menchov of Team Katusha, Szmyd and Cofidis rider David Moncoutié had enough in reserve to take out the top four places on the stage. Michael Albasini once again retained the leader's jersey; continuing to hold his 92-second lead over fellow Swiss rider Steve Morabito of BMC Racing Team, who moved up from fourth after Ryder Hesjedal of Garmin–Barracuda and Ag2r–La Mondiale's Mikaël Cherel both lost time.

Stage 4 result

	Rider	Team	Time
1	Rigoberto Urán (COL)	Team Sky	5h 13' 12"
2	Denis Menchov (RUS)	Team Katusha	s.t.
3	Sylwester Szmyd (POL)	Liquigas–Cannondale	s.t.
4	David Moncoutié (FRA)	Cofidis	s.t.
5	Jurgen Van den Broeck (BEL)	Lotto–Belisol	s.t.
6	Samuel Sánchez (ESP)	Euskaltel–Euskadi	s.t.
7	Matteo Carrara (ITA)	Vacansoleil–DCM	s.t.
8	Dario Cataldo (ITA)	Omega Pharma–Quick-Step	s.t.
9	Julien Simon (FRA)	Saur–Sojasun	s.t.
10	Robert Kišerlovski (CRO)	Astana	s.t.

General Classification after Stage 4

	Rider	Team	Time
1	Michael Albasini (SUI)	GreenEDGE	12h 25' 24"
2	Steve Morabito (SUI)	BMC Racing Team	+ 1' 32"
3	Jurgen Van den Broeck (BEL)	Lotto–Belisol	+ 1' 32"
4	Dan Martin (IRL)	Garmin–Barracuda	+ 1' 32"
5	Samuel Sánchez (ESP)	Euskaltel–Euskadi	+ 1' 32"
6	Rigoberto Urán (COL)	Team Sky	+ 1' 32"
7	Sergio Pardilla (ESP)	Movistar Team	+ 1' 32"
8	Damiano Cunego (ITA)	Lampre–ISD	+ 1' 32"
9	Tom Danielson (USA)	Garmin–Barracuda	+ 1' 32"
10	Robert Kišerlovski (CRO)	Astana	+ 1' 32"

=== Stage 5 ===
23 March 2012 — Ascó to Manresa, 207.1 km (128.7 mi)

Mini-attacks set the course for the stage as the field remained as one, for much of the first half of the stage. It was not until after 85 km (52.8 mi) that the stage's primary breakaway had been formed. Six riders – BMC Racing Team rider Mathias Frank, Omega Pharma–Quick-Step's Kristof Vandewalle, mountains classification leader Chris Anker Sørensen of Team Saxo Bank, Vacansoleil–DCM rider Tomasz Marczyński, Caja Rural's Marcos García and Nicolas Edet of Cofidis – originally managed to breach the confines of the field, and set off in a bid to extend a substantial advantage of the main field. Javier Ramírez of Andalucía also went clear of the main field, but could not catch up to the sextet out front, and was eventually pulled back by the peloton. At the intermediate sprint, coming after 108 km (67.1 mi) in Santa Coloma de Queralt, the breakaway held a lead of seven-and-a-half minutes over the peloton. That gap was reduced as several teams picked up the pace on the front of the peloton; with 50 km (31.1 mi) remaining of the stage, the breakaway group held an advantage of five minutes over the rest of the field, and the time gap was reducing at a rate of a minute per 10 km (6.2 mi).

By the time the race had reached the second, and final, climb of the day, the Alt de Montserrat, the gap had been more than halved down to a gap of 2' 10". Frank attacked on the climb, and took Sørensen, Edet and García with him, but with the peloton closing ever nearer, the chances of a successful breakaway diminished. In fact, the four remaining breakaway riders held a lead of just 23 seconds at the top of the climb, and were eventually caught on the descent. Damiano Cunego (Lampre–ISD) and Levi Leipheimer (Omega Pharma–Quick-Step both tried to push clear of the reduced group of elite contenders, but were both closed down not long after. Cunego's luck was against him also, as he punctured close to the finish. He managed to recover back to the group, not losing time overall. Omega Pharma–Quick-Step tried to set up the finish for one of their riders, but could do no better than fifth for Dario Cataldo; as Julien Simon took out the victory for the Saur–Sojasun team, while Stage 4 winner Rigoberto Urán (Team Sky) finished second, and Sylwester Szmyd finished third for the second successive stage for Liquigas–Cannondale. Michael Albasini, who finished seventh on the day, maintained his 92-second overall lead for GreenEDGE.

Stage 5 result

	Rider	Team	Time
1	Julien Simon (FRA)	Saur–Sojasun	4h 58' 27"
2	Rigoberto Urán (COL)	Team Sky	s.t.
3	Sylwester Szmyd (POL)	Liquigas–Cannondale	s.t.
4	Samuel Sánchez (ESP)	Euskaltel–Euskadi	s.t.
5	Dario Cataldo (ITA)	Omega Pharma–Quick-Step	s.t.
6	Jurgen Van den Broeck (BEL)	Lotto–Belisol	s.t.
7	Michael Albasini (SUI)	GreenEDGE	s.t.
8	Denis Menchov (RUS)	Team Katusha	s.t.
9	Dan Martin (IRL)	Garmin–Barracuda	s.t.
10	Robert Kišerlovski (CRO)	Astana	s.t.

General Classification after Stage 5

	Rider	Team	Time
1	Michael Albasini (SUI)	GreenEDGE	17h 23' 51"
2	Jurgen Van den Broeck (BEL)	Lotto–Belisol	+ 1' 32"
3	Dan Martin (IRL)	Garmin–Barracuda	+ 1' 32"
4	Samuel Sánchez (ESP)	Euskaltel–Euskadi	+ 1' 32"
5	Rigoberto Urán (COL)	Team Sky	+ 1' 32"
6	Damiano Cunego (ITA)	Lampre–ISD	+ 1' 32"
7	Tom Danielson (USA)	Garmin–Barracuda	+ 1' 32"
8	Sergio Pardilla (ESP)	Movistar Team	+ 1' 32"
9	Robert Kišerlovski (CRO)	Astana	+ 1' 32"
10	Dario Cataldo (ITA)	Omega Pharma–Quick-Step	+ 1' 32"

=== Stage 6 ===
24 March 2012 — Sant Fruitós de Bages to Badalona, 169.4 km (105.3 mi)

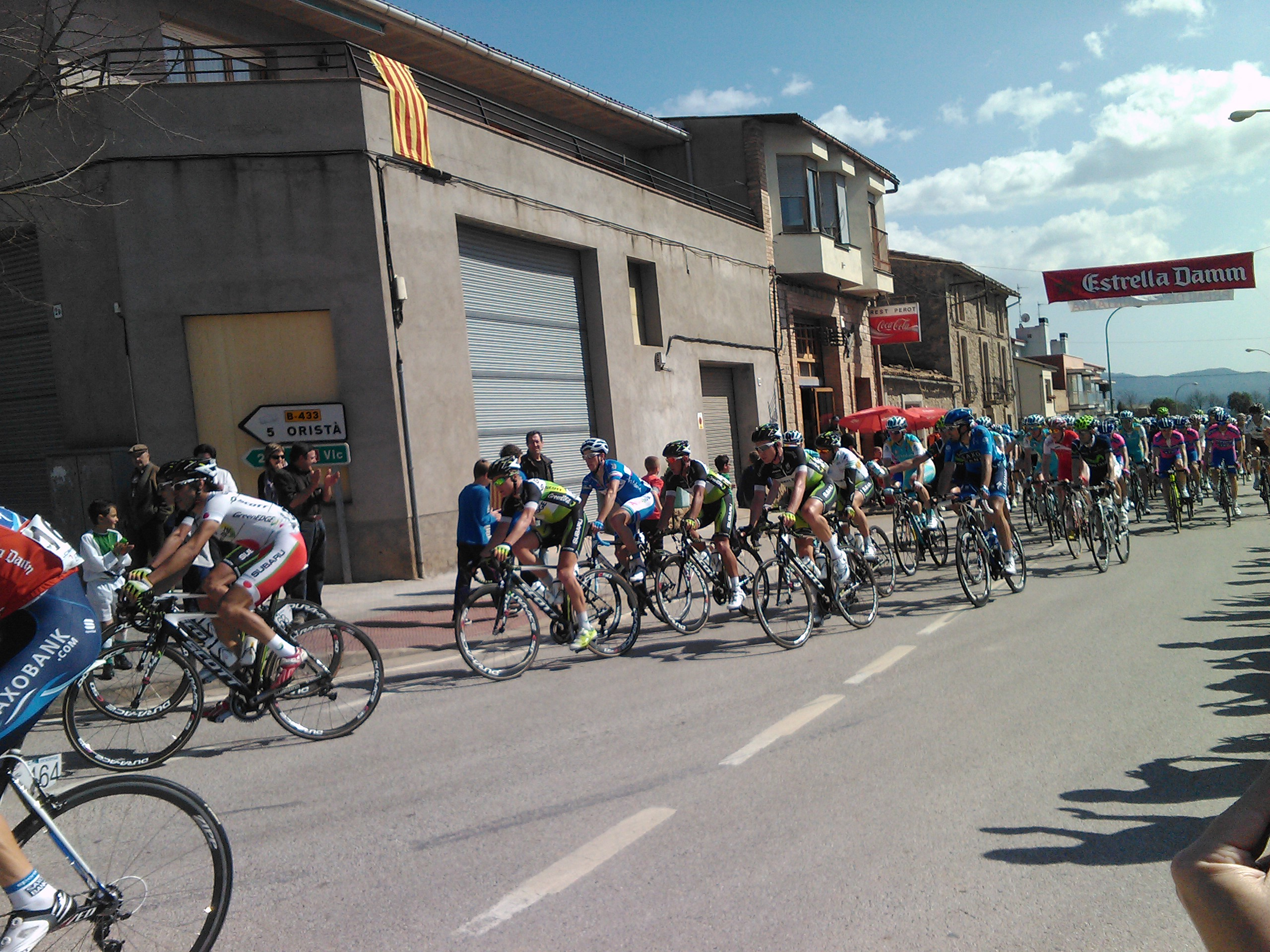
The peloton making their way through Sant Feliu Sasserra during the stage.

Just like the previous day's stage, mini-attacks set the course for the early running; at least four separate groups attacked inside the first 40 km (24.9 mi) of the parcours. It was at this point that two riders decided to venture clear of the peloton; French duo David Moncoutié (Cofidis) and Cédric Pineau (FDJ–BigMat) set the tempo off the front, and were chased by several other riders. Garmin–Barracuda's Ryder Hesjedal was among those chasing after Moncoutié and Pineau, in the hope of bringing himself back into overall contention, having been as high as second in the overall classification earlier in the week. The group was brought back however, but another French rider, Mikaël Cherel of the Ag2r–La Mondiale team, bridged up to his compatriots and they set about extending their gap over the field; the peloton allowed them to break free, as Cherel was best placed of the riders overall at sixteen minutes down. The trio held an advantage of three minutes after 72 km (44.7 mi), when the race took a temporary halt after a police motorcycle collided with a car head-on, on the stage route. Both the occupant of the car and the motorcyclist were taken to hospital with non-life-threatening injuries; while the race itself was halted for 40 minutes.

Once the accident was cleared, the breakaway trio were allowed to leave with their original three-minute advantage, after the peloton had negated their gap through the time that they had been stopped. Their attacking impetus had been stunted however, as they were losing time quickly and were eventually caught prior to the stage's final climb of the day, the Alt de la Conresa. Pineau's team-mate Jussi Veikkanen was next to try an attack off the front of the peloton, and despite pressure from the Caja Rural team, he managed to get clear and was later joined by Stage 3 winner Janez Brajkovič of Astana, Cofidis rider Romain Zingle and Project 1t4i's Yann Huguet. The lead quartet pushed on through the final intermediate sprint point in Mollet del Vallès, and managed to hold their advantage onto the Alt de la Conresa. Huguet could not live with the pace that was being set by Brajkovič, but his efforts were ultimately in vain as the main field quickly caught up to them prior to the summit of the climb.

Having done most of the work on the front, Team Katusha had a rider go clear for a period, but Alberto Losada was brought back very quickly. Ag2r–La Mondiale's Romain Bardet and Francis Mourey, the third FDJ–BigMat rider to make an attempt to get clear, both launched attacks prior to the final finishing circuit in Badalona. They both tried to set themselves up for long solo bids for victory, but the peloton closed them down as soon as they could build an advantage. With 3 km (1.9 mi) and the field still together, it had the hallmarks for a bunch sprint; but Euskaltel–Euskadi rider Samuel Sánchez attacked on a slight incline, hoping to achieve a small split in the field and move himself into second place overall behind GreenEDGE's Michael Albasini. Sánchez did just that, as he soloed to the stage victory – his team's first of the season – and a two-second winning margin over the rest of the field, led across the line by Albasini's team-mate Allan Davis and Stage 5 winner Julien Simon of Saur–Sojasun. Albasini finished in the pack to go into the final day with a lead of exactly 90 seconds, while behind Sánchez, thirteen riders were grouped together on the same time, two seconds behind Sánchez.

Stage 6 result

	Rider	Team	Time
1	Samuel Sánchez (ESP)	Euskaltel–Euskadi	4h 04' 50"
2	Allan Davis (AUS)	GreenEDGE	+ 2"
3	Julien Simon (FRA)	Saur–Sojasun	+ 2"
4	Juan José Haedo (ARG)	Team Saxo Bank	+ 2"
5	Damiano Cunego (ITA)	Lampre–ISD	+ 2"
6	Francesco Gavazzi (ITA)	Astana	+ 2"
7	Fabio Sabatini (ITA)	Liquigas–Cannondale	+ 2"
8	Dan Martin (IRL)	Garmin–Barracuda	+ 2"
9	Davide Appollonio (ITA)	Team Sky	+ 2"
10	Jurgen Van den Broeck (BEL)	Lotto–Belisol	+ 2"

General Classification after Stage 6

	Rider	Team	Time
1	Michael Albasini (SUI)	GreenEDGE	21h 28' 43"
2	Samuel Sánchez (ESP)	Euskaltel–Euskadi	+ 1' 30"
3	Jurgen Van den Broeck (BEL)	Lotto–Belisol	+ 1' 32"
4	Dan Martin (IRL)	Garmin–Barracuda	+ 1' 32"
5	Rigoberto Urán (COL)	Team Sky	+ 1' 32"
6	Damiano Cunego (ITA)	Lampre–ISD	+ 1' 32"
7	Sergio Pardilla (ESP)	Movistar Team	+ 1' 32"
8	Robert Kišerlovski (CRO)	Astana	+ 1' 32"
9	Dario Cataldo (ITA)	Omega Pharma–Quick-Step	+ 1' 32"
10	Matteo Carrara (ITA)	Vacansoleil–DCM	+ 1' 32"

=== Stage 7 ===
25 March 2012 — Badalona to Barcelona, 119.8 km (74.4 mi)

The race ended with a short, yet tough, stage into Barcelona; as part of the 119.8 km (74.4 mi) parcours, there were three third-category climbs and a second-category climb, all coming after the 50 km (31.1 mi) mark. Nine riders representing seven teams contributed to the opening move of the stage, as they accelerated off the front of the main field after just 6 km (3.7 mi). Their advantage, however, was always checked by the peloton, instead keeping the gap at a manageable distance. As such, the nine riders only held a lead of just over ninety seconds for most of the first half of the stage. Javier Ramírez was the first to summit the Alt d'Ullastrell for Andalucía, while at the second climb, it was Team Katusha's Petr Ignatenko that took the honours on the Castellbisbal.

The peloton, being led by GreenEDGE and Garmin–Barracuda, closed in yet further on the lead group, with the advantage for the nine out front dropping under the minute mark, as they descended from the Castellbisbal. Ignatenko's team-mate Gatis Smukulis, a stage winner at the 2011 race and Astana's Aleksandr Dyachenko attacked on the second-category Alt de Tibidabo, coming with around 30 km (18.6 mi) left on the stage. After Nicolas Edet (Cofidis) joined them on the climb, Dyachenko went off the front again, and soloed away while his eight breakaway companions were caught. Four other attacks occurred on the run-in to Barcelona, with Rabobank's Luis León Sánchez getting the most leeway from the group; holding an advantage of around a minute with 15 km (9.3 mi) to go, but could not survive off the front. Ultimately, it came down to another sprint finish, with in-form Julien Simon taking his second win for Saur–Sojasun in three days, ahead of Francesco Gavazzi of Astana and Lampre–ISD's Damiano Cunego. Michael Albasini finished in the pack to claim the victory, maintaining his 90-second advantage over Samuel Sánchez of Euskaltel–Euskadi.

Stage 7 result

	Rider	Team	Time
1	Julien Simon (FRA)	Saur–Sojasun	2h 47' 02"
2	Francesco Gavazzi (ITA)	Astana	s.t.
3	Damiano Cunego (ITA)	Lampre–ISD	s.t.
4	Rigoberto Urán (COL)	Team Sky	s.t.
5	Robert Kišerlovski (CRO)	Astana	s.t.
6	Jurgen Van den Broeck (BEL)	Lotto–Belisol	s.t.
7	Steven Kruijswijk (NED)	Rabobank	s.t.
8	Romain Bardet (FRA)	Ag2r–La Mondiale	s.t.
9	Maciej Paterski (POL)	Liquigas–Cannondale	s.t.
10	Denis Menchov (RUS)	Team Katusha	s.t.

Final General Classification

	Rider	Team	Time
1	Michael Albasini (SUI)	GreenEDGE	24h 15' 45"
2	Samuel Sánchez (ESP)	Euskaltel–Euskadi	+ 1' 30"
3	Jurgen Van den Broeck (BEL)	Lotto–Belisol	+ 1' 32"
4	Dan Martin (IRL)	Garmin–Barracuda	+ 1' 32"
5	Rigoberto Urán (COL)	Team Sky	+ 1' 32"
6	Damiano Cunego (ITA)	Lampre–ISD	+ 1' 32"
7	Robert Kišerlovski (CRO)	Astana	+ 1' 32"
8	Matteo Carrara (ITA)	Vacansoleil–DCM	+ 1' 32"
9	Dario Cataldo (ITA)	Omega Pharma–Quick-Step	+ 1' 32"
10	Sergio Pardilla (ESP)	Movistar Team	+ 1' 32"

== Classification leadership table ==
In the 2012 Volta a Catalunya, four different jerseys were awarded. For the general classification, calculated by adding each cyclist's finishing times on each stage, the leader received a white and green jersey. This classification was considered the most important of the 2012 Volta a Catalunya, and the winner of the classification was considered the winner of the race. Additionally, there was a sprints classification, which awarded a white jersey. In the sprints classification, cyclists received points for finishing in the top 3 at intermediate sprint points during each stage.

There was also a mountains classification, the leadership of which was marked by a red jersey. In the mountains classification, points were won by reaching the top of a climb before other cyclists, with more points available for the higher-categorised climbs. The fourth jersey represented the Catalan rider classification, marked by a blue jersey. This was calculated in the same manner as the general classification, calculated by adding each Catalan cyclist's finishing times on each stage. There was also a classification for teams, in which the times of the best three cyclists per team on each stage were added together; the leading team at the end of the race was the team with the lowest total time.

Stage	Winner	General Classification	Mountains Classification	Sprint Classification	Best Catalan Classification	Team Classification
1	Michael Albasini	Michael Albasini	Michael Albasini	Anthony Delaplace	Jordi Simón	GreenEDGE
2	Michael Albasini	Michael Albasini	Michael Albasini	Anthony Delaplace	Alberto Losada	Team Sky
3	Janez Brajkovič	Michael Albasini	Chris Anker Sørensen	Michael Albasini	Alberto Losada	Team Sky
4	Rigoberto Urán	Michael Albasini	Chris Anker Sørensen	Julián Sánchez	Alberto Losada	Garmin–Barracuda
5	Julien Simon	Michael Albasini	Chris Anker Sørensen	Tomasz Marczyński	Alberto Losada	Garmin–Barracuda
6	Samuel Sánchez	Michael Albasini	Chris Anker Sørensen	Tomasz Marczyński	Alberto Losada	Garmin–Barracuda
7	Julien Simon	Michael Albasini	Chris Anker Sørensen	Tomasz Marczyński	Alberto Losada	Garmin–Barracuda
Final		Michael Albasini	Chris Anker Sørensen	Tomasz Marczyński	Alberto Losada	Garmin–Barracuda
