= Alessandro Proni =

Italian cyclist

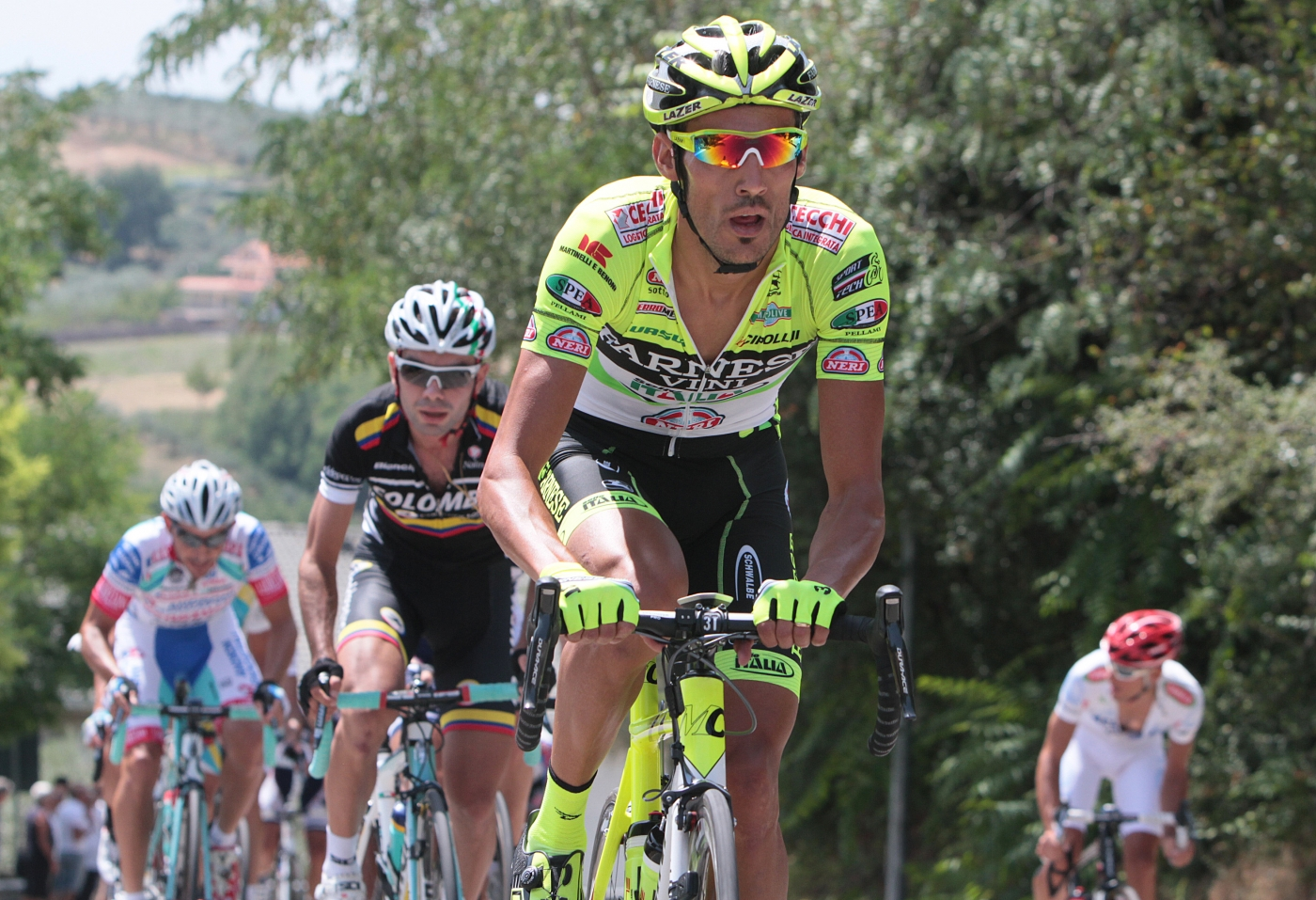
- Alessandro Proni at Azione

Personal information
- Full name: Alessandro Proni
- Born: 28 December 1982 (age 43) Rome, Italy
- Height: 1.83 m (6 ft 0 in)
- Weight: 68 kg (150 lb)

Cycling career
- Sport: Cycling
- Discipline: Road
- Role: Rider

Amateur teams
- 2004: Formaggi Pinzolo Fiavè (stagiaire)
- 2006: Quick-Step–Innergetic (stagiaire)

Professional teams
- 2007–2008: Quick-Step–Innergetic
- 2009–2010: ISD
- 2011: Acqua & Sapone
- 2012–2013: Farnese Vini–Selle Italia

Major wins
- Tour de Suisse, 1 stage

Alessandro Proni (born 28 December 1982) is an Italian professional road bicycle racer, who last rode for UCI Professional Continental team Vini Fantini–Selle Italia.

== Major results ==
2006
3rd Trofeo Franco Balestra
2007
1st Stage 3 Tour de Suisse
3rd Overall Tour de Picardie
2010
3rd Gran Premio Industria e Commercio di Prato
2013
4th Giro dell'Appennino
