= Criterium d'Abruzzo =

Race details
- Date: July
- Region: Abruzzo, Italy
- Discipline: Road
- Type: One-day race

History
- First edition: 1988
- Editions: 12
- Final edition: 2004
- First winner: Gianluca Bortolami (ITA)
- Final winner: Enrico Degano (ITA)

The Criterium d'Abruzzo was a single-day road cycling held annually in the region of Abruzzo. First held in 1988, it has not been contested since 2004, despite having been scheduled for the 2005 UCI Europe Tour.

== Winners ==
Year	Winner	Second	Third
1993	(Italy) Gianluca Bortolami	(Italy) Andrea Ferrigato	(Italy) Michele Bartoli
1994	(Italy) Michele Bartoli	(United Kingdom) Maximilian Sciandri	(Denmark) Rolf Sørensen
1995	(Italy) Alberto Elli	(Italy) Andrea Ferrigato	(Italy) Gian Matteo Fagnini
1996	(Italy) Stefano Colagè	(Italy) Mirco Gualdi	(Italy) Claudio Chiappucci
1997	(Italy) Daniele Nardello	(Italy) Giorgio Furlan	(Italy) Stefano Colagè
1998	(Italy) Francesco Casagrande	(Italy) Alessandro Bertolini	(Italy) Fausto Dotti
1999	(Switzerland) Pascal Richard	(Italy) Gianmario Ortenzi	(Italy) Luca Mazzanti
2000	(Italy) Massimo Apollonio	(Italy) Alberto Loddo	(Italy) Sandro Giacomelli
2001	(Czech Republic) Milan Kadlec	(Italy) Ruggero Marzoli	(Slovenia) Saša Sviben
2002	(Italy) Salvatore Commesso	(Italy) Daniele Bennati	(Italy) Ruggero Marzoli
2003	(Italy) Matteo Carrara	(Italy) Eddy Serri	(Italy) Daniele Bennati
2004	(Italy) Enrico Degano	(Italy) Matteo Carrara	(Italy) Paolo Bossoni
