= Murilo Fischer =

Brazilian cyclist (born 1979)

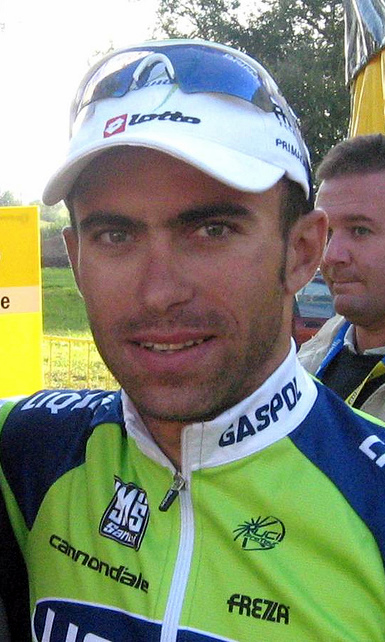
- Fischer at the 2007 Tour de Pologne

Personal information
- Full name: Murilo Antonio Fischer
- Born: 16 June 1979 (age 47) Brusque, Santa Catarina, Brazil
- Height: 1.71 m (5 ft 7 in)
- Weight: 64 kg (141 lb)

Cycling career
- Sport: Cycling
- Discipline: Road
- Role: Rider
- Rider type: Sprinter

Professional teams
- 2004–2006: Domina Vacanze
- 2007–2009: Liquigas
- 2010–2012: Garmin–Transitions
- 2013–2016: FDJ

Major wins
- UCI Europe Tour (2005); Giro del Piemonte (2005); National Road Race Championships (2010, 2011)

Murilo Antonio Fischer (born 16 June 1979) is a Brazilian former professional road bicycle racer, who rode professionally between 2004 and 2016 for the Naturino–Sapore di Mare, Liquigas, Garmin–Sharp and FDJ teams. He represented Brazil in five Olympic Games between 2000 and 2016, and competed at thirteen Grand Tours.

== Career ==
Fischer was born in Brusque, Santa Catarina. Prior to moving to the Garmin–Transitions team in 2010, Fischer had raced his whole career with Italian teams, having begun his career with Domina Vacanze in 2004, before the team moved up to UCI Professional Continental level as Naturino–Sapore di Mare for the 2005 and 2006 seasons. At Naturino–Sapore di Mare, Fischer proved his consistency over a season by winning the 2005 UCI Europe Tour. In 2007, Fischer made the step up to the UCI ProTour with Liquigas. He became the second Brazilian to win a UCI World Tour race stage, winning stage five at the 2007 Tour de Pologne.

Fischer signed with Garmin–Transitions on 3 January 2010, to be part of Tyler Farrar's leadout train in the 2010 season. Fischer left Garmin–Sharp at the end of the 2012 season, and joined FDJ on a two-year contract from the 2013 season onwards.

Fisher completed the 2015 Vuelta a España and he became the first Brazilian rider to have completed all Grand Tours.

== Major results ==
2000
1st Prova Ciclística 9 de Julho
2nd Tour do Rio
2001
2nd Copa América de Ciclismo
2002
1st Stage 4 Giro Ciclistico d'Italia
2nd Tour do Rio
2003
1st Road race, UCI B World Championships
2004
4th Overall Uniqa Classic
6th Overall Tour Down Under
6th Criterium d'Abruzzo
2005
1st Overall UCI Europe Tour
1st Giro del Piemonte
1st Gran Premio Bruno Beghelli
1st Gran Premio Industria e Commercio di Prato
1st Trofeo Città di Castelfidardo
1st Due Giorni Marchigiana
1st Memorial Cimurri
1st Stage 3 Tour of Qinghai Lake
2nd Overall Uniqa Classic

1st Stages 1 & 3

2nd Giro del Lazio
3rd Coppa Bernocchi
3rd Gran Premio Industria e Commercio Artigianato Carnaghese
4th Stausee-Rundfahrt Klingnau
4th Gran Premio Città di Misano – Adriatico
4th Coppa Sabatini
5th Road race, UCI Road World Championships
7th Overall Circuit de Lorraine
2006
8th Overall Giro della Provincia di Lucca
2007
1st Stage 5 Tour de Pologne
2nd Gran Premio Industria e Commercio di Prato
3rd Trofeo Calvia
10th Dwars door Vlaanderen
2008
4th Gran Premio Industria e Commercio Artigianato Carnaghese
4th Vattenfall Cyclassics
6th Coppa Bernocchi
2009
1st Giro della Romagna
3rd Road race, National Road Championships
7th Giro del Friuli
10th Grand Prix de Fourmies
2010
1st Road race, National Road Championships
2nd Gran Premio Nobili Rubinetterie
2011
1st Road race, National Road Championships
1st Trofeo Magaluf-Palmanova
4th Trofeo Inca
2012
1st Stage 2 (TTT) Tour of Qatar

=== Grand Tour general classification results timeline ===
Grand Tour	2007	2008	2009	2010	2011	2012	2013	2014	2015	2016
Giro d'Italia	—	—	—	112	DNF	—	147	135	130	152
Tour de France	101	76	—	—	—	—	133	—	—	—
Vuelta a España	—	—	—	—	DNF	—	—	DNF	156	DNF

Legend
—	Did not compete
DNF	Did not finish
