= Stuttgart–Strasbourg =

Road bicycle race in France and Germany

Race details
- Date: Early-August
- Region: France, Germany
- Discipline: Road
- Competition: UCI Europe Tour
- Type: Stage race

History
- First edition: 1966
- Editions: 33
- Final edition: 2005
- First winner: René Goetz (FRA)
- Final winner: Michael Muck (GER)

Stuttgart–Strasbourg was a road bicycle race held annually in France and Germany, between Stuttgart and Strasbourg. It was first held in 1966 and held annually until 1996 as an amateur race. A revival was held in 2005 on the UCI Europe Tour but the race was not held again.

== Winners ==
Year	Country	Rider	Team
1966	France	René Goetz	
1967	France	Roger Reininger	
1968	France	Robert Bischoff	
1969	West Germany	Jörg Frank	
1970	West Germany	Jörg Frank	
1971	West Germany	Kurt Forster	
1972	France	Jean-Pierre Puccianti	
1973	France	Jean-Pierre Puccianti	
1974	West Germany	Herbert Stodal	
1975	West Germany	Jörg Haller	
1976	West Germany	Uli Rottler	
1977	West Germany	Gerald Schutz	
1978	West Germany	Joachim Fehrenbacher	
1979	West Germany	Joachim Fehrenbacher	
1980	West Germany	Michael Maue	
1981	West Germany	Christian Bock	
1982	France	Jean-Maris Landherr	
1983	West Germany	Uwe Messerschmidt	
1984	West Germany	Rainer Lemke	
1985	West Germany	Kurt Eipper	
1986	France	Gilles Delion	
1987	France	Fabrice Philipot	
1988	France	Philippe Bau	
1989	France	Fabrice Julien	
1990	France	Fabrice Julien	
1991	France	Richard Szostak	
1992	Bulgaria	Hristo Zaikov	
1993	Lithuania	Saulius Ruškys	
1994	Germany	Oliver Hartmann	
1995	Germany	Uw Peschel	
1996	Germany	Ralf Werner	
1997-2004	No race		
2005	Germany	Michael Muck	
