= Marek Maciejewski =

Polish bicycle racer (born 1977)

Personal information
- Born: 6 June 1977 (age 49) Toruń, Poland

Cycling career
- Sport: Cycling
- Current team: Road
- Discipline: Road
- Role: Rider

Professional teams
- 2000–2001: Atlas–Lukullus
- 2002–2003: Servisco–Koop
- 2004–2005: Grupa PSB
- 2007: Weltour

Marek Maciejewski (born 6 June 1977) is a Polish former professional cyclist.

== Major results ==
2001
1st Stage 6 Tour du Maroc
2005
1st Neuseen Classics – Rund um die Braunkohle
1st Memoriał Henryka Łasaka
2006
1st Stages 1 & 5 Tour du Sénégal
