= Paolo Bailetti =

Italian cyclist (born 1980)

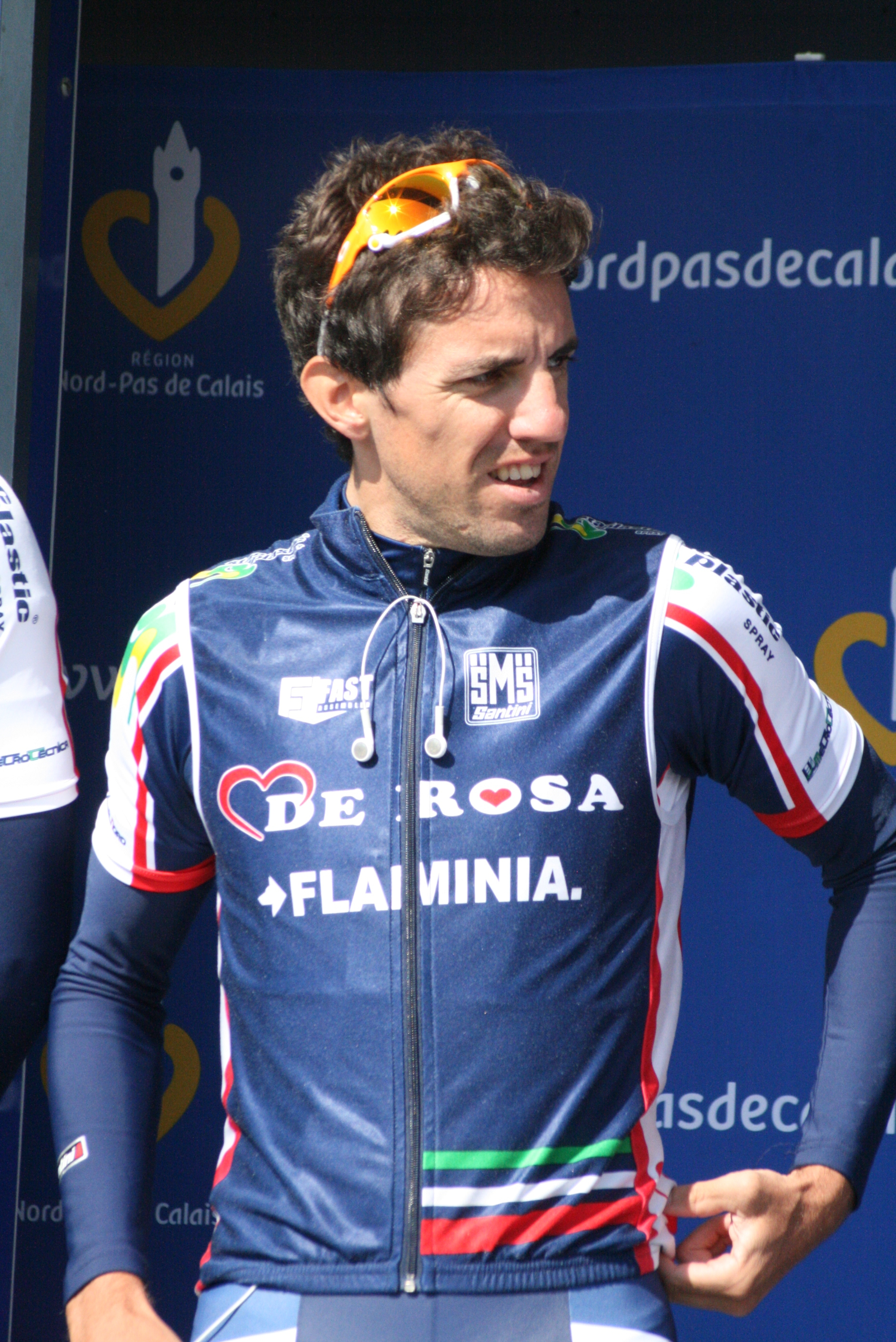

Personal information
- Full name: Paolo Bailetti
- Born: 15 July 1980 (age 46) Somma Lombardo, Italy

Cycling career
- Sport: Cycling
- Discipline: Road
- Role: Rider

Professional teams
- 2005–2006: Androni Giocattoli–3C Casalinghi
- 2007–2008: Team LPR
- 2009: Fuji–Servetto
- 2010: Ceramica Flaminia
- 2011–2012: De Rosa–Ceramica Flaminia

Paolo Bailetti (born 15 July 1980) is an Italian professional road bicycle racer who last rode for the UCI Professional Continental team Szuper Beton.

== Major results ==
2002
1st Under-23 National Road Race Championships
2003
2nd Overall Girobio
2004
1st Ruota d'Oro
2005
2nd Trofeo Matteotti
3rd Giro del Medio Brenta
5th GP Nobili Rubinetterie
7th Tre Valli Varesine
8th GP Industria Artigianato e Commercio Carnaghese
2006
9th Memorial Cimurri
2007
4th Giro dell'Appennino
4th Coppa Placci
5th Overall Brixia Tour
5th Trofeo Melinda
8th Giro del Veneto
2008
7th GP du Canton d'Argovie
2010
5th Trofeo Matteotti
6th GP du Canton d'Argovie
7th Giro della Romagna
2011
6th Memorial Marco Pantani
6th National Road Race Championships
8th Trofeo Melinda
9th Overall Settimana Ciclistica Lombarda
10th Giro della Toscana
2012
1st Mountains classification Giro della Provincia di Reggio Calabria
5th Trofeo Matteotti
8th Tre Valli Varesine
