= Maurizio Bellin =

Italian cyclist

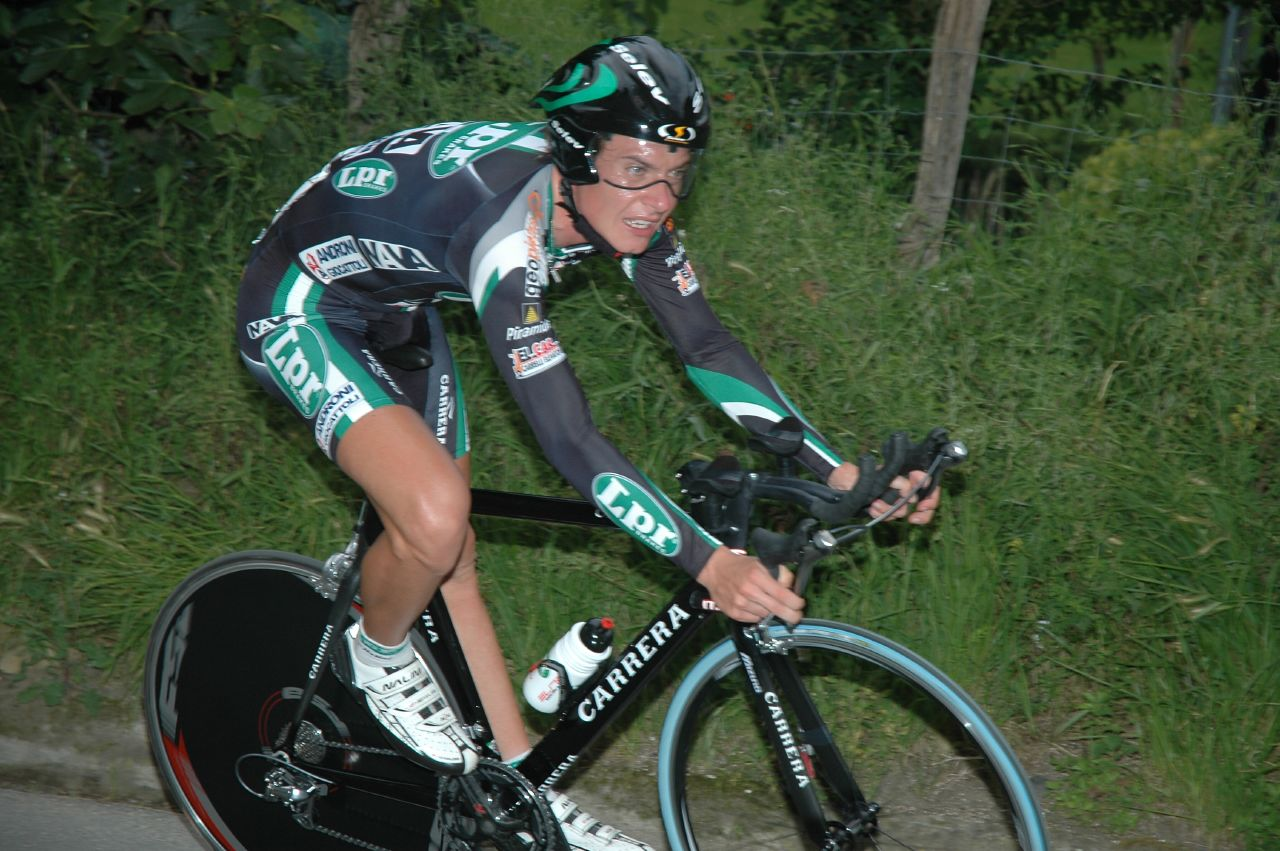
- Bellin in the 2007 Euskal Bizikleta

Personal information
- Born: 2 April 1982 (age 44) Somma Lombardo, Italy

Cycling career
- Sport: Cycling
- Current team: Retired
- Discipline: Road
- Role: Rider

Amateur teams
- 2001–2002: Resin Ragnoli–Garda Calze–Poliflex–Rifra
- 2003–2005: Podenzano–Italfine

Professional teams
- 2006: Androni Giocattoli–3C Casalinghi Jet
- 2007: Team LPR

Maurizio Bellin (born 2 April 1982 in Somma Lombardo) is an Italian former road cyclist.

== Major results ==
2005
2nd Giro della Valsesia
2007
7th Ronde van Drenthe
