= Team 3C Casalinghi Jet Androni Giocattoli =

Team 3C Casalinghi Jet Androni Giocattoli (UCI team code: AGC) was a professional continental cycling team based in Italy that participates in UCI Continental Circuits races and when selected as a wildcard to UCI ProTour events. The team is managed by Mario Manzoni with Massimo Rabbaglio assisting as a directeur sportif. For the 2007 season, the team merged into the Team L.P.R. structure.

== 2006 squad ==
Name	Birthdate	Nationality
Paolo Bailetti	15.07.1980	Italy
Maurizio Bellin	20.04.1982	Italy
Cristian Bonfanti	30.11.1981	Italy
Daniele Callegarin	21.09.1982	Italy
Riccardo Chiarini	20.02.1984	Italy
Raffaele Ferrara	03.10.1976	Italy
Blazej Janiaczyk	27.01.1983	Poland
Konstantin Klyuev	29.05.1981	Russia
Oleksandr Kvachuk	23.07.1983	Ukraine
Juan Magallanes	06.02.1982	Mexico
Marco Marcato	11.02.1984	Italy
Massimo Mazzanti	07.06.1982	Italy
Matteo Montaguti	06.01.1984	Italy
Marco Osella	06.01.1981	Italy
Walter Proch	17.02.1984	Italy
Nicola Scattolin	09.08.1982	Italy
Luca Solari	02.10.1979	Italy
