= 2007 Tour of Slovenia =

UCI Europe Tour (2.1 race)

Race details
- Dates: 12–16 June 2007
- Stages: 5
- Distance: 835 km (518.8 mi)
- Winning time: 21h 02' 10"

Results
Jersey awarded to the overall winner	Winner	(Slovenia) Tomaž Nose
	Second	(Italy) Vincenzo Nibali
	Third	(Italy) Andrea Noè
Jersey awarded to the points classification winner	Points	(Italy) Vincenzo Nibali
Jersey awarded to the mountains classification winner	Mountains	(Italy) Gabriele Bosisio
Jersey awarded to the youth classification winner	Youth	(Slovenia) Simon Špilak
	Team	(Italy) Liquigas

The 2007 Tour of Slovenia (Slovene: Dirka po Sloveniji) was the 14th edition of the Tour of Slovenia, categorized as 2.1 stage race (UCI Europe Tour) held between 12 and 16 June 2007.

The race consisted of 5 stages with 835 km (518.8 mi) in total.

== Teams ==
Total 113 riders (86 finished it) from 15 teams started the race.

=== Pro Tour ===
- (Italy) Lampre–Fondital
- (Italy) Liquigas

=== Pro Continental ===
- (Italy) Acqua & Sapone–Caffè Mokambo
- (Republic of Ireland) Tenax–Menikini
- (Bulgaria) Miche
- (Republic of Ireland) Team LPR

=== Continental ===
- (Slovenia) Perutnina Ptuj
- (Slovenia) Sava
- (Slovenia) Adria Mobil
- (Slovenia) Radenska–PowerBar
- (Czech Republic) PSK Whirlpool–Hradec Krlove
- (Switzerland) OTC Doors–Lauretana
- (San Marino) Cinelli–OPD–Endeka
- (Italy) Aurum Hotels

=== National ===
- Croatia

== Route and stages ==
Stage characteristics and winners
Stage	Date	Course	Length	Type	Winner
1	12 June	Ljubljana – Zagreb (Croatia)	182 km (113 mi)	Plain stage	(Italy) Danilo Napolitano
2	13 June	Šentjernej – Ljubljana	163 km (101 mi)	Hilly stage	(Italy) Stefano Garzelli
3	14 June	Medvode – Beljak/Villach (Austria)	168 km (104 mi)	Mountain stage	(Italy) Vincenzo Nibali
4	15 June	Kranjska Gora – Tarvisio (Italy) – Vršič	160 km (99 mi)	Mountain stage	(Italy) Vincenzo Nibali
5	16 June	Grosuplje – Novo mesto	162 km (101 mi)	Hilly stage	(Italy) Enrico Rossi
Total		835 km (518.8 mi)			

== Classification leadership ==
Classification leadership by stage
Stage	Winner	General classification	Points classification	Mountains classification	Young rider classification	Team classification
1	Danilo Napolitano	Danilo Napolitano	Danilo Napolitano	Matej Stare	Jože Senekovič	Perutnina Ptuj
2	Stefano Garzelli	Mitja Mahorič	Danilo Napolitano	Grega Bole	Leopold König	Perutnina Ptuj
3	Vincenzo Nibali	Mitja Mahorič	Enrico Gasparotto	Luigi Sestili	Leopold König	Perutnina Ptuj
4	Vincenzo Nibali	Tomaž Nose	Vincenzo Nibali	Gabriele Bosisio	Simon Špilak	Liquigas
5	Enrico Rossi	Tomaž Nose	Vincenzo Nibali	Gabriele Bosisio	Simon Špilak	Liquigas
Final		Tomaž Nose	Vincenzo Nibali	Gabriele Bosisio	Simon Špilak	Liquigas

== Final classification standings ==
Legend
Denotes the leader of the general classification	Denotes the leader of the mountains classification
Denotes the leader of the points classification	Denotes the leader of the young rider classification
Denotes the leader of the team classification	

=== General classification ===
Rank	Rider	Team	Time
1	(Slovenia) Tomaž Nose	Adria Mobil	21h 02' 10"
2	(Italy) Vincenzo Nibali	Liquigas	+ 39"
3	(Italy) Andrea Noè	Liquigas	+ 1' 13"
4	(Slovenia) Simon Špilak	Adria Mobil	+ 1' 24"
5	(Italy) Giampaolo Caruso	Lampre - Fondital	+ 1' 38"
6	(Croatia) Matija Kvasina	Perutnina Ptuj	+ 1' 46"
7	(Italy) Massimiliano Maisto	OTC Doors - Lauretana	+ 2' 09"
8	(Slovenia) Jure Golčer	Tenax Salmilano	+ 2' 59"
9	(Slovenia) Mitja Mahorič	Perutnina Ptuj	+ 3' 12"
10	(Italy) Pasquale Muto	Miche	+ 3' 31"

=== Points classification ===
Rank	Rider	Team	Points
1	(Italy) Vincenzo Nibali	Liquigas	50
2	(Italy) Enrico Rossi	OTC Doors - Lauretana	50
3	(Italy) Enrico Gasparotto	Liquigas	40
4	(Slovenia) Borut Božič	Team L.P.R.	39
5	(Italy) Danilo Napolitano	Lampre - Fondital	36
6	(Slovenia) Tomaž Nose	Adria Mobil	29
7	(Italy) Daniele Pietropolli	Tenax Salmilano	29
8	(Poland) Krzysztof Szczawiński	Miche	29
9	(Slovenia) Mitja Mahorič	Perutnina Ptuj	28
10	(Italy) Paolo Bossoni	Lampre - Fondital	28

=== Mountains classification ===
Rank	Rider	Team	Points
1	(Italy) Gabriele Bosisio	Tenax Salmilano	26
2	(Slovenia) Gašper Švab	Sava	20
3	(Slovenia) Grega Bole	Sava	14
4	(Italy) Vincenzo Nibali	Liquigas	13
5	(Italy) Luigi Sestili	Aurum Hotels	11

=== Young rider classification ===
Rank	Rider	Team	Time
1	(Slovenia) Simon Špilak	Adria Mobil	21h 03' 34"
2	(Czech Republic) Roman Kreuziger	Liquigas	+ 2' 29"
3	(Italy) Francesco Masciarelli	Acqua & Sapone - Caffe Mokambo	+ 2' 41"
4	(Czech Republic) Leopold König	PSK Whirpool Hradec Kralove	+ 3' 37"
5	(Croatia) Robert Kišerlovski	Adria Mobil	+ 10' 19"

=== Team classification ===
Rank	Team	Time
1	(Italy) Liquigas	63h 10′ 07″
2	(Slovenia) Perutnina Ptuj	+ 5′ 20″
3	(Slovenia) Adria Mobil	+ 5′ 50″
4	(Republic of Ireland) Tenax Salmilano	+ 7′ 55″
5	(Slovenia) Sava	+ 16′ 21″
6	(Italy) Lampre-Fondital	+ 22′ 38″
7	(Bulgaria) Miche	+ 24′ 34″
8	(Czech Republic) PSK Whirlpool Hradec Kralove	+ 30′ 53″
9	(Italy) Aurum Hotels	+ 31′ 50″
10	(Republic of Ireland) Team L.P.R.	+ 33′ 11″
