= Lagana =

Lagana may refer to:

- Lagana (bread), a Greek flatbread baked for Clean Monday
- Tracta (dough) or lagana, an ancient pastry dough from Greek and Roman cuisine
- Laganas, seaside resort on the Greek island of Zakynthos
- Dan Lagana, American television writer
- Frankie Lagana (1985–), Australian soccer player
- Joseph Lagana (1978–), American politician
- Sergio Lagana (born 1982). Italian professional road cyclist
