= 2009 Tirreno–Adriatico =

2009 UCI World Ranking, race 3 of 24

Race details
- Dates: 11–17 March 2009
- Stages: 7
- Distance: 1,095 km (680.4 mi)
- Winning time: 27h 37' 22"

Results
Jersey awarded to the overall winner	Winner	Michele Scarponi (ITA)	(Diquigiovanni–Androni)
	Second	Stefano Garzelli (ITA)	(Acqua & Sapone–Caffè Mokambo)
	Third	Andreas Klöden (GER)	(Astana)
Jersey awarded to the points classification winner	Points	Julien El Fares (FRA)	(Cofidis)
Jersey awarded to the mountains classification winner	Mountains	Egoi Martínez (ESP)	(Euskaltel–Euskadi)
Jersey awarded to the youth classification winner	Youth	Thomas Lövkvist (SWE)	(Team Columbia–High Road)
	Team	(United States) Team High Road	

The 2009 Tirreno–Adriatico, the 44th running of the race, started on 11 March and finished on 17 March. The race started in Cecina and ended in San Benedetto del Tronto. The race was the third event in the inaugural UCI World Ranking.

== Teams ==
Twenty-five teams, containing a total of 200 riders, participated in the race:

- Team Saxo Bank
- Acqua & Sapone–Caffè Mokambo
- Ag2r–La Mondiale
- Astana
- Barloworld
- Bbox Bouygues Telecom
- Caisse d'Epargne
- Ceramica Flaminia–Bossini Docce
- Cervélo TestTeam
- Cofidis
- Diquigiovanni–Androni
- Euskaltel–Euskadi
- Française des Jeux
- Garmin–Slipstream
- Lampre–NGC
- Liquigas
- LPR Brakes–Farnese Vini
- Quick-Step
- Rabobank
- Silence–Lotto
- Team Columbia–High Road
- Team Katusha
- Team Milram
- Vacansoleil
- Fuji–Servetto

== Route ==
Stage characteristics and winners
Stage	Date	Course	Distance	Type	Winner
1	11 March	Cecina to Capannori	147 km (91 mi)	Flat stage	Julien El Fares (FRA)
2	12 March	Volterra to Marina di Carrara	177 km (110 mi)	Hilly stage	Alessandro Petacchi (ITA)
3	13 March	Fucecchio to Santa Croce sull'Arno	166 km (103 mi)	Flat stage	Tyler Farrar (USA)
4	14 March	Foligno to Montelupone	171 km (106 mi)	Hilly stage	Joaquim Rodríguez (ESP)
5	15 March	Loreto to Macerata	30 km (19 mi)	Individual time trial	Andreas Klöden (GER)
6	16 March	Civitanova Marche to Camerino	235 km (146 mi)	Medium mountain stage	Michele Scarponi (ITA)
7	17 March	San Benedetto del Tronto to San Benedetto del Tronto	169 km (105 mi)	Hilly stage	Mark Cavendish (GBR)

== Stages ==
=== Stage 1 ===
11 March 2009 — Cecina to Capannori, 147 km (91 mi)

Stage 1 result

	Cyclist	Team	Time
1	Julien El Fares (FRA)	Cofidis	3h 34' 03"
2	Vladimir Duma (UKR)	Ceramica Flaminia–Bossini Docce	s.t.
3	Daniele Bennati (ITA)	Liquigas	+ 12"
4	Alessandro Petacchi (ITA)	LPR Brakes–Farnese Vini	s.t.
5	Tom Boonen (BEL)	Quick-Step	s.t.
6	Fabian Wegmann (GER)	Team Milram	s.t.
7	Enrico Rossi (ITA)	Ceramica Flaminia–Bossini Docce	s.t.
8	Leonardo Duque (COL)	Cofidis	s.t.
9	Assan Bazayev (KAZ)	Astana	s.t.
10	Matti Breschel (DEN)	Team Saxo Bank	s.t.

General Classification after Stage 1

	Cyclist	Team	Time
1	Julien El Fares (FRA)	Cofidis	3h 33' 50"
2	Vladimir Duma (UKR)	Ceramica Flaminia–Bossini Docce	+ 5"
3	Daniele Bennati (ITA)	Liquigas	+ 21"
4	Alessandro Petacchi (ITA)	LPR Brakes–Farnese Vini	+ 25"
5	Tom Boonen (BEL)	Quick-Step	s.t.
6	Fabian Wegmann (GER)	Team Milram	s.t.
7	Enrico Rossi (ITA)	Ceramica Flaminia–Bossini Docce	s.t.
8	Leonardo Duque (COL)	Cofidis	s.t.
9	Assan Bazayev (KAZ)	Astana	s.t.
10	Matti Breschel (DEN)	Team Saxo Bank	s.t.

=== Stage 2 ===
12 March 2009 — Volterra to Marina di Carrara, 177 km (110 mi)

Stage 2 result

	Cyclist	Team	Time
1	Alessandro Petacchi (ITA)	LPR Brakes–Farnese Vini	4h 32' 42"
2	Daniele Bennati (ITA)	Liquigas	s.t.
3	Koldo Fernández (ESP)	Euskaltel–Euskadi	s.t.
4	Dominique Rollin (CAN)	Cervélo TestTeam	s.t.
5	Luca Paolini (ITA)	Acqua & Sapone–Caffè Mokambo	s.t.
6	Manuel Belletti (ITA)	Diquigiovanni–Androni	s.t.
7	Stuart O'Grady (AUS)	Team Saxo Bank	s.t.
8	Enrico Rossi (ITA)	Ceramica Flaminia–Bossini Docce	s.t.
9	Baden Cooke (AUS)	Vacansoleil	s.t.
10	Allan Davis (AUS)	Quick-Step	s.t.

General Classification after Stage 2

	Cyclist	Team	Time
1	Julien El Fares (FRA)	Cofidis	8h 6' 32"
2	Alessandro Petacchi (ITA)	LPR Brakes–Farnese Vini	+ 15"
3	Daniele Bennati (ITA)	Liquigas	s.t.
4	Enrico Rossi (ITA)	Ceramica Flaminia–Bossini Docce	+ 24"
5	Leonardo Duque (COL)	Cofidis	+ 25"
6	Assan Bazayev (KAZ)	Astana	s.t.
7	Matti Breschel (DEN)	Team Saxo Bank	s.t.
8	Lorenzo Bernucci (ITA)	LPR Brakes–Farnese Vini	s.t.
9	Filippo Pozzato (ITA)	Team Katusha	s.t.
10	George Hincapie (USA)	Team Columbia–High Road	s.t.

=== Stage 3 ===
13 March 2009 — Fucecchio to Santa Croce sull'Arno, 166 km (103 mi)

Stage 3 result

	Cyclist	Team	Time
1	Tyler Farrar (USA)	Garmin–Slipstream	3h 53' 48"
2	Mark Cavendish (GBR)	Team Columbia–High Road	s.t.
3	Enrico Rossi (ITA)	Ceramica Flaminia–Bossini Docce	s.t.
4	Tom Boonen (BEL)	Quick-Step	s.t.
5	Robbie McEwen (AUS)	Team Katusha	s.t.
6	Stuart O'Grady (AUS)	Team Saxo Bank	s.t.
7	Robert Hunter (RSA)	Barloworld	s.t.
8	Luca Paolini (ITA)	Acqua & Sapone–Caffè Mokambo	s.t.
9	Thor Hushovd (NOR)	Cervélo TestTeam	s.t.
10	Borut Božič (SLO)	Vacansoleil	s.t.

General Classification after Stage 3

	Cyclist	Team	Time
1	Julien El Fares (FRA)	Cofidis	12h 20"
2	Alessandro Petacchi (ITA)	LPR Brakes–Farnese Vini	+ 15"
3	Daniele Bennati (ITA)	Liquigas	s.t.
4	Enrico Rossi (ITA)	Ceramica Flaminia–Bossini Docce	+ 20"
5	Leonardo Duque (COL)	Liquigas	+ 25"
6	Assan Bazayev (KAZ)	Astana	s.t.
7	Matti Breschel (DEN)	Team Saxo Bank	s.t.
8	Enrico Gasparotto (ITA)	Lampre–NGC	s.t.
9	George Hincapie (USA)	Team Columbia–High Road	s.t.
10	Lorenzo Bernucci (ITA)	LPR Brakes–Farnese Vini	s.t.

=== Stage 4 ===
14 March 2009 — Foligno to Montelupone, 171 km (106 mi)

Stage 4 result

	Cyclist	Team	Time
1	Joaquim Rodríguez (ESP)	Caisse d'Epargne	4h 08' 35"
2	Davide Rebellin (ITA)	Diquigiovanni–Androni	+ 6"
3	Thomas Lövkvist (SWE)	Team Columbia–High Road	+ 10"
4	Danilo Di Luca (ITA)	LPR Brakes–Farnese Vini	+ 14"
5	Stefano Garzelli (ITA)	Acqua & Sapone–Caffè Mokambo	+ 21"
6	Julien El Fares (FRA)	Cofidis	s.t.
7	Ryder Hesjedal (CAN)	Garmin–Slipstream	s.t.
8	Andreas Klöden (GER)	Astana	s.t.
9	Michele Scarponi (ITA)	Diquigiovanni–Androni	s.t.
10	Vincenzo Nibali (ITA)	Liquigas	s.t.

General Classification after Stage 4

	Cyclist	Team	Time
1	Joaquim Rodríguez (ESP)	Caisse d'Epargne	16h 9' 10"
2	Julien El Fares (FRA)	Cofidis	+ 6"
3	Davide Rebellin (ITA)	Diquigiovanni–Androni	+ 10"
4	Thomas Lövkvist (SWE)	Team Columbia–High Road	+ 16"
5	Danilo Di Luca (ITA)	LPR Brakes–Farnese Vini	+ 24"
6	Vincenzo Nibali (ITA)	Liquigas	+ 31"
7	Ryder Hesjedal (CAN)	Garmin–Slipstream	s.t.
8	Stefano Garzelli (ITA)	Acqua & Sapone–Caffè Mokambo	s.t.
9	Andreas Klöden (GER)	Astana	s.t.
10	Michele Scarponi (ITA)	Diquigiovanni–Androni	s.t.

=== Stage 5 ===
15 March 2009 — Loreto to Macerata, 30 km (19 mi) (ITT)

Stage 5 result

	Cyclist	Team	Time
1	Andreas Klöden (GER)	Astana	41' 32"
2	Stijn Devolder (BEL)	Quick-Step	+ 20"
3	Thomas Lövkvist (SWE)	Team Columbia–High Road	+ 21"
4	Michele Scarponi (ITA)	Diquigiovanni–Androni	s.t.
5	Mikhail Ignatiev (RUS)	Team Katusha	+ 32"
6	Robert Gesink (NED)	Rabobank	+ 40"
7	Stefano Garzelli (ITA)	Acqua & Sapone–Caffè Mokambo	+ 32"
8	Edvald Boasson Hagen (NOR)	Team Columbia–High Road	+ 52"
9	Linus Gerdemann (GER)	Team Milram	+ 58"
10	Jérôme Coppel (FRA)	Française des Jeux	+ 1' 00"

General Classification after Stage 5

	Cyclist	Team	Time
1	Andreas Klöden (GER)	Astana	16h 51' 13"
2	Thomas Lövkvist (SWE)	Team Columbia–High Road	+ 6"
3	Michele Scarponi (ITA)	Diquigiovanni–Androni	+ 21"
4	Stefano Garzelli (ITA)	Acqua & Sapone–Caffè Mokambo	+ 41"
5	Davide Rebellin (ITA)	Diquigiovanni–Androni	+ 1' 02"
6	Vincenzo Nibali (ITA)	Liquigas	+ 1' 07"
7	Linus Gerdemann (GER)	Team Milram	+ 1' 22"
8	Ivan Basso (ITA)	Liquigas	+ 1' 25"
9	Ryder Hesjedal (CAN)	Garmin–Slipstream	+ 1' 26"
10	Johan Van Summeren (BEL)	Silence–Lotto	+ 1' 34"

=== Stage 6 ===
16 March 2009 — Civitanova Marche to Camerino, 235 km (146 mi)

Stage 6 result

	Cyclist	Team	Time
1	Michele Scarponi (ITA)	Diquigiovanni–Androni	6h 36' 12"
2	Stefano Garzelli (ITA)	Acqua & Sapone–Caffè Mokambo	+ 1"
3	Ivan Basso (ITA)	Liquigas	+ 3"
4	Danilo Di Luca (ITA)	LPR Brakes–Farnese Vini	+ 1' 09"
5	Joaquim Rodríguez (ESP)	Caisse d'Epargne	+ 1' 11"
6	Julien El Fares (FRA)	Cofidis	+ 1' 15"
7	Davide Rebellin (ITA)	Diquigiovanni–Androni	s.t.
8	Luca Mazzanti (ITA)	Team Katusha	s.t.
9	Thomas Lövkvist (SWE)	Team Columbia–High Road	s.t.
10	Daniele Pietropolli (ITA)	LPR Brakes–Farnese Vini	s.t.

General Classification after Stage 6

	Cyclist	Team	Time
1	Michele Scarponi (ITA)	Diquigiovanni–Androni	23h 27' 36"
2	Stefano Garzelli (ITA)	Acqua & Sapone–Caffè Mokambo	+ 25"
3	Andreas Klöden (GER)	Astana	+ 1' 07"
4	Thomas Lövkvist (SWE)	Team Columbia–High Road	+ 1' 10"
5	Ivan Basso (ITA)	Liquigas	+ 1' 13"
6	Davide Rebellin (ITA)	Diquigiovanni–Androni	+ 2' 06"
7	Linus Gerdemann (GER)	Team Milram	+ 2' 32"
8	Ryder Hesjedal (CAN)	Garmin–Slipstream	+ 2' 33"
9	Kanstantsin Sivtsov (BLR)	Team Columbia–High Road	+ 2' 41"
10	Vincenzo Nibali (ITA)	Liquigas	+ 2' 54"

=== Stage 7 ===
17 March 2009 — San Benedetto del Tronto to San Benedetto del Tronto, 169 km (105 mi)

Stage 7 result

	Cyclist	Team	Time
1	Mark Cavendish (GBR)	Team Columbia–High Road	4h 9' 46"
2	Tyler Farrar (USA)	Garmin–Slipstream	s.t.
3	Baden Cooke (AUS)	Vacansoleil	s.t.
4	Daniele Bennati (ITA)	Liquigas	s.t.
5	Yauheni Hutarovich (BLR)	Française des Jeux	s.t.
6	Angelo Furlan (ITA)	Lampre–NGC	s.t.
7	Aurélien Clerc (SUI)	Ag2r–La Mondiale	s.t.
8	Danilo Napolitano (ITA)	Team Katusha	s.t.
9	Luca Paolini (ITA)	Acqua & Sapone–Caffè Mokambo	s.t.
10	Allan Davis (AUS)	Quick-Step	s.t.

General Classification after Stage 7

	Cyclist	Team	Time
1	Michele Scarponi (ITA)	Diquigiovanni–Androni	27h 37' 22"
2	Stefano Garzelli (ITA)	Acqua & Sapone–Caffè Mokambo	+ 25"
3	Andreas Klöden (GER)	Astana	+ 1' 07"
4	Thomas Lövkvist (SWE)	Team Columbia–High Road	+ 1' 10"
5	Ivan Basso (ITA)	Liquigas	+ 1' 13"
6	Davide Rebellin (ITA)	Diquigiovanni–Androni	+ 2' 06"
7	Linus Gerdemann (GER)	Team Milram	+ 2' 32"
8	Ryder Hesjedal (CAN)	Garmin–Slipstream	+ 2' 33"
9	Kanstantsin Sivtsov (BLR)	Team Columbia–High Road	+ 2' 41"
10	Vincenzo Nibali (ITA)	Liquigas	+ 2' 54"

== Final standings ==
=== General classification ===
	Cyclist	Team	Time
1	Michele Scarponi (ITA)	Diquigiovanni–Androni	27h 37' 22"
2	Stefano Garzelli (ITA)	Acqua & Sapone–Caffè Mokambo	+ 25"
3	Andreas Klöden (GER)	Astana	+ 1' 07"
4	Thomas Lövkvist (SWE)	Team Columbia–High Road	+ 1' 10"
5	Ivan Basso (ITA)	Liquigas	+ 1' 13"
6	Davide Rebellin (ITA)	Diquigiovanni–Androni	+ 2' 06"
7	Linus Gerdemann (GER)	Team Milram	+ 2' 32"
8	Ryder Hesjedal (CAN)	Garmin–Slipstream	+ 2' 33"
9	Kanstantsin Sivtsov (BLR)	Team Columbia–High Road	+ 2' 41"
10	Vincenzo Nibali (ITA)	Liquigas	+ 2' 54"

=== Points classification ===
	Cyclist	Team	Points
1	Julien El Fares (FRA)	Cofidis	27
2	Daniele Bennati (ITA)	Liquigas	25
3	Mark Cavendish (GBR)	Team Columbia–High Road	22
4	Tyler Farrar (USA)	Garmin–Slipstream	22
5	Michele Scarponi (ITA)	Diquigiovanni–Androni	21
6	Stefano Garzelli (ITA)	Acqua & Sapone–Caffè Mokambo	20
7	Alessandro Petacchi (ITA)	LPR Brakes–Farnese Vini	19
8	Joaquim Rodríguez (ESP)	Caisse d'Epargne	18
9	Thomas Lövkvist (SWE)	Team Columbia–High Road	18
10	Andreas Klöden (GER)	Astana	15

=== Mountains classification ===
	Cyclist	Team	Points
1	Egoi Martínez (ESP)	Euskaltel–Euskadi	10
2	Davide Rebellin (ITA)	Diquigiovanni–Androni	6
3	Ermanno Capelli (ITA)	Fuji–Servetto	6
4	Julien El Fares (FRA)	Cofidis	5
5	Gilberto Simoni (ITA)	Diquigiovanni–Androni	5
6	Giampaolo Cheula (ITA)	Barloworld	5
7	Lieuwe Westra (NED)	Vacansoleil	5
8	Olivier Kaisen (BEL)	Silence–Lotto	5
9	Michele Scarponi (ITA)	Diquigiovanni–Androni	5
10	Matteo Carrara (ITA)	Vacansoleil	5

=== Youth Classification ===
	Cyclist	Team	Time
1	Thomas Lövkvist (SWE)	Team Columbia–High Road	27h 38' 32"
2	Vincenzo Nibali (ITA)	Liquigas	+ 1' 44"
3	Robert Gesink (NED)	Rabobank	+ 1' 55"
4	Julien El Fares (FRA)	Cofidis	+ 2' 11"
5	Eros Capecchi (ITA)	Fuji–Servetto	+ 2' 27"
6	Rene Mandri (EST)	Ag2r–La Mondiale	+ 13' 20"
7	Johannes Fröhlinger (GER)	Team Milram	+ 13' 46"
8	Valerio Agnoli (ITA)	Liquigas	+ 15' 9"
9	Peter Velits (SVK)	Team Milram	+ 17' 52"
10	Anthony Roux (FRA)	Française des Jeux	+ 27' 17"

== Jersey progress ==
Stage (Winner)	General Classification	Points Classification	Mountains Classification	Young Rider Classification
Stage 1 (Julien El Fares)	Julien El Fares	Julien El Fares	Julien El Fares	Julien El Fares
Stage 2 (Alessandro Petacchi)	Julien El Fares	Alessandro Petacchi	Julien El Fares	Julien El Fares
Stage 3 (Tyler Farrar)	Julien El Fares	Alessandro Petacchi	Ermanno Capelli	Julien El Fares
Stage 4 (Joaquim Rodríguez)	Joaquim Rodríguez	Julien El Fares	Ermanno Capelli	Julien El Fares
Stage 5 (ITT) (Andreas Klöden)	Andreas Klöden	Julien El Fares	Ermanno Capelli	Thomas Lövkvist
Stage 6 (Michele Scarponi)	Michele Scarponi	Julien El Fares	Egoi Martínez	Thomas Lövkvist
Stage 7 (Mark Cavendish)	Michele Scarponi	Julien El Fares	Egoi Martínez	Thomas Lövkvist
Final	Michele Scarponi	Julien El Fares	Egoi Martínez	Thomas Lövkvist

== Withdrawals ==
	Stage	Cyclist	Team	Reason
DNF	2	(Slovenia) Janez Brajkovič	Astana	Head injuries sustained in crash
DNS	4	(Norway) Thor Hushovd	Cervélo TestTeam	
DNF	5	(United Kingdom) Geraint Thomas	Barloworld	Leg and facial injuries sustained in crash
DNS	6	(Luxembourg) Andy Schleck	Team Saxo Bank	
DNF	6	(Switzerland) Fabian Cancellara	Team Saxo Bank	
