= 2012 Monviso-Venezia — Il Padania =

2012 UCI Europe Tour

Race details
- Dates: 3–7 September
- Stages: 5
- Distance: 913 km (567 mi)
- Winning time: 22h 33' 52"

Results
Jersey awarded to the overall winner	Winner	Vincenzo Nibali (ITA)	(Liquigas–Cannondale)
	Second	Riccardo Chiarini (ITA)	(Androni Giocattoli–Venezuela)
	Third	Franco Pellizotti (ITA)	(Androni Giocattoli–Venezuela)
Jersey awarded to the points classification winner	Points	Vincenzo Nibali (ITA)	(Liquigas–Cannondale)
Jersey awarded to the mountains classification winner	Mountains	Vincenzo Nibali (ITA)	(Liquigas–Cannondale)
Jersey awarded to the young rider classification winner	Young rider	Carlos Betancur (COL)	(Acqua & Sapone)
	Team	Androni Giocattoli–Venezuela	

The 2012 Monviso-Venezia — Il Padania was the second edition of the race, held in 2011 as Giro di Padania. The race started on 3 September in Sant'Agostino and ended on 7 September in Frabosa Soprana, passing through the area struck by an earthquake in May 2012.

19 teams and 152 riders participated to the race. The 2011 winner Ivan Basso did not take part in the race, with 2010 Vuelta a España winner Vincenzo Nibali leading team Liquigas–Cannondale instead. Other notable riders who participated were the winner of the 2011 Giro d'Italia Michele Scarponi, the sprinter Alessandro Petacchi, the 2012 Italian Road Race Champion Franco Pellizotti and the 2004 Liège–Bastogne–Liège winner Davide Rebellin.

The race was dominated by Vincenzo Nibali (Liquigas–Cannondale), who took the leader's jersey on the third stage (won by Oscar Gatto), won the fourth stage and the General classification as well as the Points and King of the Mountains classifications. Acqua & Sapone's Carlos Betancur won the Young Rider classification, and Androni Giocattoli finished first in the Team classification.

== Race Overview ==
Stage	Date	Course	Distance	Type	Winner
1a	3 September	Sant'Agostino to Bondeno	83 km (51.6 mi)	Flat stage	Enrico Rossi (ITA)
1b	3 September	San Giovanni Persiceto to Crevalcore	18 km (11.2 mi)	Team time trial	Colnago–CSF Bardiani
2	4 September	Poggio Renatico to San Vendemiano	223 km (138.6 mi)	Flat stage	Sacha Modolo (ITA)
3	5 September	Castelfranco Veneto to Merate	229 km (142.3 mi)	Flat stage	Oscar Gatto (ITA)
4	6 September	Lazzate to Passo della Bocchetta	186 km (115.6 mi)	Mountain stage	Vincenzo Nibali (ITA)
5	7 September	Acqui Terme to Frabosa Soprana	174 km (108.1 mi)	Mountain stage	Carlos Betancur (COL)
Total		913 km (567.3 mi)			

== Final standings ==
=== General Classification ===
	Rider	Team	Time
1	Vincenzo Nibali (ITA)	Liquigas–Cannondale	22h 33' 52"
2	Riccardo Chiarini (ITA)	Androni Giocattoli–Venezuela	+ 40"
3	Franco Pellizotti (ITA)	Androni Giocattoli–Venezuela	+ 44"
4	Domenico Pozzovivo (ITA)	Colnago–CSF Bardiani	+ 46"
5	Davide Rebellin (ITA)	Meridiana–Kamen	+ 1' 18"
6	Emanuele Sella (ITA)	Androni Giocattoli–Venezuela	+ 1' 21"
7	Matteo Rabottini (ITA)	Farnese Vini–Selle Italia	+ 1' 29"
8	Carlos Betancur (COL)	Acqua & Sapone	+ 2' 00"
9	Kristijan Đurasek (CRO)	Adria Mobil	+ 2' 14"
10	Darwin Atapuma (COL)	Colombia–Coldeportes	+ 2' 48"

=== Points Classification ===
	Rider	Team	Points
1	Vincenzo Nibali (ITA)	Liquigas–Cannondale	20
2	Davide Rebellin (ITA)	Meridiana–Kamen	16
3	Riccardo Chiarini (ITA)	Androni Giocattoli–Venezuela	12

=== King of the Mountains Classification ===
	Rider	Team	Points
1	Vincenzo Nibali (ITA)	Liquigas–Cannondale	16
2	José Serpa (COL)	Androni Giocattoli–Venezuela	8
3	Davide Rebellin (ITA)	Meridiana–Kamen	6

=== Young Rider Classification ===
	Rider	Team	Time
1	Carlos Betancur (COL)	Acqua & Sapone	22h 14' 36"
2	Enrico Battaglin (ITA)	Colnago–CSF Bardiani	+ 5' 29"
3	Jan Hirt (CZE)	Leopard–Trek Continental Team	+ 11' 46"
