= 2011 Giro di Padania =

2011 UCI Europe Tour

Race details
- Dates: 6–10 September
- Stages: 5
- Distance: 900 km (559.2 mi)
- Winning time: 22h 13' 28"

Results
Jersey awarded to the overall winner	Winner	Ivan Basso (ITA)	(Liquigas–Cannondale)
	Second	Giovanni Visconti (ITA)	(Farnese Vini–Neri Sottoli)
	Third	Francesco Masciarelli (ITA)	(Astana)
Jersey awarded to the points classification winner	Points	Elia Viviani (ITA)	(Liquigas–Cannondale)
Jersey awarded to the mountains classification winner	Mountains	Simone Campagnaro (ITA)	(D'Angelo & Antenucci–Nippo)
Jersey awarded to the youth classification winner	Youth	Francesco Masciarelli (ITA)	(Astana)
Jersey awarded to the sprints classification winner	Sprints	Elia Viviani (ITA)	(Liquigas–Cannondale)
	Team	Androni Giocattoli	

The 2011 Giro di Padania was the first edition of the Giro di Padania cycling stage race. It started on 6th September in Paesana and ended on the 10th in Montecchio Maggiore.

More than 200 riders and 25 teams participated in the race, including the ProTour teams Liquigas–Cannondale, Lampre–ISD and Astana, and the national teams of Australia, Poland and Slovenia. Among the riders who took part to the race there were the 2006 and 2010 Giro d'Italia winner Ivan Basso, the 2011 Milano-Sanremo winner Matthew Goss, the Italian Road Race Champion Giovanni Visconti, the 2000 Giro d'Italia winner Stefano Garzelli, and the classic specialist Davide Rebellin.

The race was won by Liquigas–Cannondale rider Ivan Basso, who claimed the leader's green jersey after winning the fourth stage.

In the race's other classifications, Liquigas–Cannondale rider Elia Viviani won the Points and the Intermediate Sprints classifications, Simone Campagnaro of D'Angelo & Antenucci–Nippo won the light blue jersey for the King of the Mountains classification, Astana's Francesco Masciarelli, who was third in the General classification, won the Young Rider classification, with Androni Giocattoli finishing at the head of the Teams classification.

== Race overview ==
Stage	Date	Course	Distance	Type	Winner
1	6 September	Paesana to Laigueglia	170 km (105.6 mi)	Flat stage	Sacha Modolo (ITA)
2	7 September	Loano to Vigevano	187 km (116.2 mi)	Flat stage	Elia Viviani (ITA)
3	8 September	Lonate Pozzolo to Salsomaggiore Terme	198 km (123.0 mi)	Flat stage	Sacha Modolo (ITA)
4	9 September	Noceto to San Valentino di Brentonico	175 km (108.7 mi)	Mountain stage	Ivan Basso (ITA)
5	10 September	Rovereto to Montecchio Maggiore	170 km (105.6 mi)	Flat stage	Andrea Guardini (ITA)

== Final standings ==
=== General Classification ===
	Rider	Team	Time
1	Ivan Basso (ITA)	Liquigas–Cannondale	22h 13' 28"
2	Giovanni Visconti (ITA)	Farnese Vini–Neri Sottoli	+ 52"
3	Francesco Masciarelli (ITA)	Astana	+ 1' 08"
4	Fortunato Baliani (ITA)	D'Angelo & Antenucci–Nippo	+ 1' 17"
5	Davide Rebellin (ITA)	Miche–Guerciotti	+ 1' 24"
6	Emanuele Sella (ITA)	Androni Giocattoli	+ 1' 32"
7	Simone Stortoni (ITA)	Colnago–CSF Inox	+ 2' 34"
8	Domenico Pozzovivo (ITA)	Colnago–CSF Inox	+ 2' 53"
9	Marek Rutkiewicz (POL)	Poland (National team)	+ 2' 57"
10	Riccardo Chiarini (ITA)	Androni Giocattoli	+ 3' 08"

=== Points Classification ===
	Rider	Team	Points
1	Elia Viviani (ITA)	Liquigas–Cannondale	44
2	Sacha Modolo (ITA)	Colnago–CSF Inox	33
3	Danilo Napolitano (ITA)	Acqua & Sapone	18

=== King of the Mountains Classification ===
	Rider	Team	Points
1	Simone Campagnaro (ITA)	D'Angelo & Antenucci–Nippo	14
2	Federico Rocchetti (ITA)	De Rosa–Ceramica Flaminia	8
3	Ivan Basso (ITA)	Liquigas–Cannondale	6

=== Sprints Classification ===
	Rider	Team	Points
1	Elia Viviani (ITA)	Liquigas–Cannondale	5
2	Paweł Bernas (POL)	Poland (National team)	4
3	Kamil Gradek (POL)	Poland (National team)	4

=== Young Rider Classification ===
	Rider	Team	Time
1	Francesco Masciarelli (ITA)	Astana	22h 14' 36"
2	Lachlan Norris (AUS)	Australia (National team)	+ 3'14"
3	Diego Ulissi (ITA)	Lampre–ISD	+ 3' 49"

== Controversy ==
This edition was heavily disrupted by activists who stated that the race was intended as political Propaganda for the Lega Nord political party. The idea of organising the race was announced by Lega Nord's leader Umberto Bossi in September 2010 and, according to the protesters, the race itself was full of references to the Padanian nationalism, such as the choice of green colour for the leader's jersey. Moreover, the race is organized by the society Monviso-Venezia, whose president, Michelino Davico, is a Lega Nord's senator.

During second stage, in Savona, Ivan Basso and Sacha Modolo had been slapped and insulted by protesters.
