= 2008 Giro d'Italia, Stage 12 to Stage 21 =

Cycling race stages

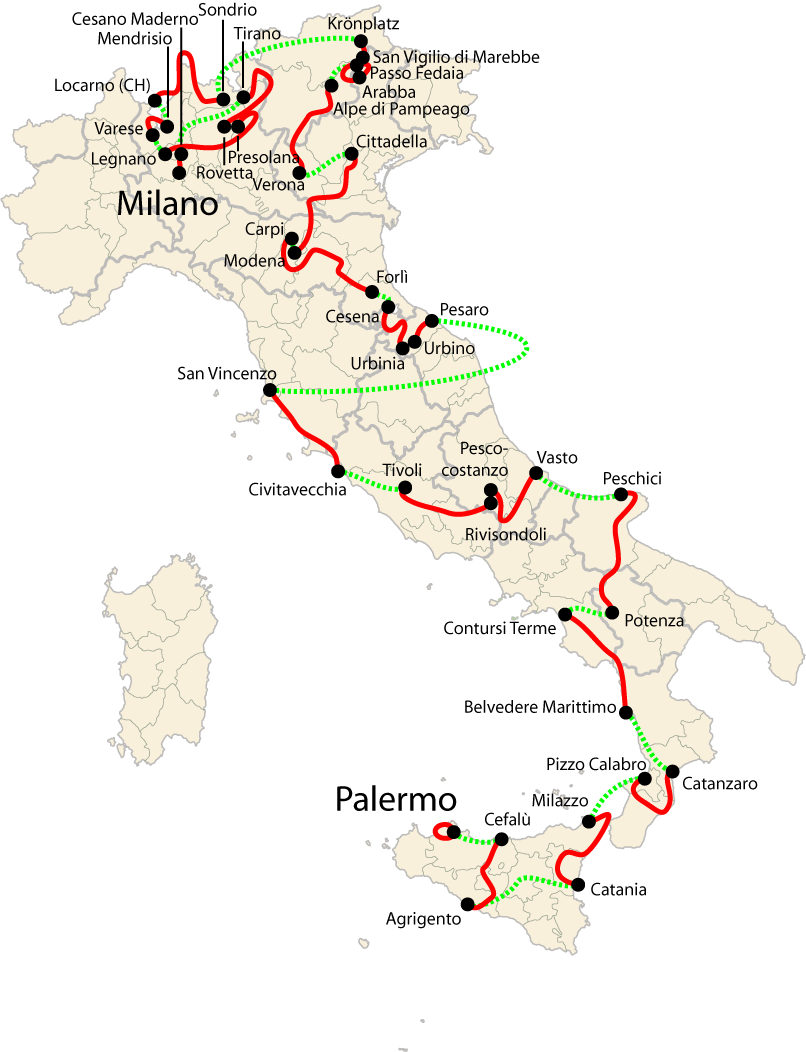
Overview of the stages; red lines represent distances covered in the individual stages, while green lines are the distances between the stages, covered by bus, car, and plane.

Stage 12 of the 2008 Giro d'Italia took place on May 22, and the race concluded on 1 June. As the second half of the Giro began, Italian national road race champion Giovanni Visconti had been first in the race's overall classification, but stood little chance of winning the race as he did not have sufficient climbing skills to be a contender on the high mountain stages featured in the race's final week. Stages 12 and 13 were flat and did not change the overall standings, but stages 14, 15, 19, and 20 all contained many high climbs.

It was after stage 15 that Alberto Contador first took the overall lead that he would eventually hold through the completion of the Giro, finishing fifteen minutes ahead of Gabriele Bosisio, who had won the pink jersey from Visconti the day before. Through the final mountain stages and two individual time trials, Contador held off the challenges of defending champion Danilo Di Luca and eventual runner-up Riccardo Riccò.

Emanuele Sella of the CSF Group–Navigare team won three stages in the Giro's final week, as well as the overall victory in the mountains classification. He would later test positive for and confess to the use of performance-enhancing drugs, casting extreme doubt on the legitimacy of these performances.

- s.t. indicates that the rider crossed the finish line in the same group as the one receiving the time above him, and was therefore credited with the same finishing time.

== Stage 12 ==
22 May 2008 — Forlì to Carpi, 172 km (107 mi)

This stage was flat, and was designed to end in a mass sprint finish. The final 42.195 km (26.2 mi) occurred on a popular Italian marathon course, with the stage dedicated to Italian marathoner Dorando Pietri.

Dionisio Galparsoro of Euskaltel–Euskadi broke away from the peloton immediately after the true start of the stage. As rain began to fall on what had previously been a sunny day, no one joined the Basque in his escape, and for much of the stage, the peloton let his advantage balloon. His maximum time gap, fourteen minutes, gradually fell to nothing as the rain intensified as the stage went on. A crash with 20 km (12 mi) to go thinned the field somewhat, but it was no hindrance to the peloton catching Galparsoro and a sprint finish occurring. Points classification leader Daniele Bennati started the sprint first, making his attack before the race's final left-hand turn. Team High Road's Mark Cavendish reacted to Bennati's quick acceleration once around that turn and almost overtook him in the final meters, but the photo finish resulted in a third stage victory for Bennati in this Giro.

Stage 12 result

| | Rider | Team | Time |
|---|---|---|---|
| 1 | Daniele Bennati (ITA) | Liquigas | 4h 05' 29" |
| 2 | Mark Cavendish (GBR) | Team High Road | s.t. |
| 3 | Robbie McEwen (AUS) | Silence–Lotto | s.t. |
| 4 | Koldo Fernández (ESP) | Euskaltel–Euskadi | s.t. |
| 5 | Paolo Bettini (ITA) | Quick-Step | s.t. |
| 6 | Robert Förster (GER) | Gerolsteiner | s.t. |
| 7 | Luciano Pagliarini (BRA) | Saunier Duval–Scott | s.t. |
| 8 | Assan Bazayev (KAZ) | Astana | s.t. |
| 9 | Alexandre Usov (BLR) | Ag2r–La Mondiale | s.t. |
| 10 | Alexander Serov (RUS) | Tinkoff Credit Systems | s.t. |

General classification after stage 12

| | Rider | Team | Time |
|---|---|---|---|
| 1 | Giovanni Visconti (ITA) | Quick-Step | 53h 05' 46" |
| 2 | Gabriele Bosisio (ITA) | LPR Brakes–Ballan | + 5' 50" |
| 3 | Alberto Contador (ESP) | Astana | + 6' 59" |
| 4 | Marzio Bruseghin (ITA) | Lampre | + 7' 52" |
| 5 | Andreas Klöden (GER) | Astana | + 7' 54" |
| 6 | Vincenzo Nibali (ITA) | Liquigas | + 8' 04" |
| 7 | Paolo Savoldelli (ITA) | LPR Brakes–Ballan | + 8' 09" |
| 8 | Riccardo Riccò (ITA) | Saunier Duval–Scott | + 8' 32" |
| 9 | Danilo Di Luca (ITA) | LPR Brakes–Ballan | + 8' 33" |
| 10 | Gustav Larsson (SWE) | Team CSC | + 8' 33" |

== Stage 13 ==
23 May 2008 — Modena to Cittadella, 177 km (110 mi)

This stage was as flat as any could conceivably get. It ended with a 6 km (3.7 mi) circuit around the walled city of Cittadella, a medieval military outpost guarding Padua.

It took several tries for a breakaway to successfully come clear of the peloton in this stage. The leader of the Trofeo Fuga Cervelo (the award giving points for kilometers spent in a breakaway) Mickaël Buffaz finally got away after 35 km (22 mi) and nearly an hour spent riding. Josu Agirre and Paolo Bettini followed him, though Bettini quickly dropped back to the peloton. Buffaz and Agiree took a maximum lead of 8'24", at the 66 km (41 mi) mark, but the stage's incredibly flat profile meant any breakaway was exceedingly unlikely to survive to the finish line. At the 12 km (7.5 mi) to go mark, the peloton was all together again. Liquigas and Team High Road led the field in through the stage's final 10 km (6.2 mi), much as they had in previous sprint stages. Daniele Bennati again started the sprint early, as he had the previous day, but this time Mark Cavendish had enough road to easily overtake him for the victory. The victory came two days after Cavendish's twenty-third birthday.

The day unexpectedly caused a minor change to the overall standings. An extremely fast leadout, coupled with a crash with 3 km (1.9 mi) remaining meant only 48 riders had the same time as the stage winner. The rest of the main field, another 108 riders, were 13 seconds back. Andreas Klöden, Danilo Di Luca, Vincenzo Nibali, and Gilberto Simoni were able to make the selection and gained a little time over their competitors.

Stage 13 result

| | Rider | Team | Time |
|---|---|---|---|
| 1 | Mark Cavendish (GBR) | Team High Road | 4h 11' 07" |
| 2 | Daniele Bennati (ITA) | Liquigas | s.t. |
| 3 | Koldo Fernández (ESP) | Euskaltel–Euskadi | s.t. |
| 4 | Erik Zabel (GER) | Team Milram | s.t. |
| 5 | Julian Dean (NZL) | Slipstream–Chipotle | s.t. |
| 6 | Mirco Lorenzetto (ITA) | Lampre | s.t. |
| 7 | Alexandre Usov (BLR) | Ag2r–La Mondiale | s.t. |
| 8 | Nikolay Trusov (RUS) | Tinkoff Credit Systems | s.t. |
| 9 | Robbie McEwen (AUS) | Silence–Lotto | s.t. |
| 10 | Graeme Brown (AUS) | Rabobank | s.t. |

General classification after stage 13

| | Rider | Team | Time |
|---|---|---|---|
| 1 | Giovanni Visconti (ITA) | Quick-Step | 57h 17' 06" |
| 2 | Gabriele Bosisio (ITA) | LPR Brakes–Ballan | + 5' 50" |
| 3 | Alberto Contador (ESP) | Astana | + 6' 59" |
| 4 | Andreas Klöden (GER) | Astana | + 7' 41" |
| 5 | Vincenzo Nibali (ITA) | Liquigas | + 7' 51" |
| 6 | Marzio Bruseghin (ITA) | Lampre | + 7' 52" |
| 7 | Paolo Savoldelli (ITA) | LPR Brakes–Ballan | + 7' 56" |
| 8 | Danilo Di Luca (ITA) | LPR Brakes–Ballan | + 8' 20" |
| 9 | Gustav Larsson (SWE) | Team CSC | + 8' 31" |
| 10 | Riccardo Riccò (ITA) | Saunier Duval–Scott | + 8' 32" |

== Stage 14 ==
24 May 2008 — Verona to Alpe di Pampeago, 195 km (121 mi)

This was the Giro's first stage classified as a mountain stage, though several of those previous had contained selective climbs. The first half of the stage contained three uncategorized rises in elevation, including one to 931 m (3,054 ft). In the stage's final 34 km (21 mi), there were two categorized climbs, the first-category Passo Manghen, featuring gradients of up to 15%, and a second-category summit stage finish at Alpe di Pampeago. The same climb featured in the 2003 Giro d'Italia, where the stage winner was eventual Giro winner Gilberto Simoni. Simoni had said before the stage that he would again try for victory on this climb.

The day's breakaway was large, comprising 13 riders from 11 teams. The only team with more than one rider in the group was Caisse d'Epargne, who had three - Joaquim Rodríguez, José Rujano, and Francisco Pérez. Other notables in the group included Christian Vande Velde, Emanuele Sella, Paolo Bettini, and Jens Voigt. The group's maximum advantage, for the time when they were all together, was 7'40", after 90 km (56 mi). When Sella attacked out of this group to try for maximum mountains points on the Passo Manghen, it was totally shattered, sending some riders, including Vande Velde, back to the peloton and gapping others on the road.

At the top of the Passo Manghen, the following groups had formed: Sella alone in front, followed at 2'42" by Vasil Kiryienka and Rodríguez, then Jure Golčer at 3'00", Rujano at 3'40", Bettini, Voigt, Rinaldo Nocentini, and Charly Wegelius at 5'28", with a group of overall favorites including Alberto Contador, Riccardo Riccò, Gilberto Simoni, and Franco Pellizotti at 10'57", and race leader Giovanni Visconti and his team a further two minutes back. Simoni's Diquigiovanni–Androni team was the one pacing the group of favorites, indicating that Simoni may have been intending to make good on his pre-stage promises to try for the win again.

The groups simplified on the Pampeago climb, with Sella still well ahead out front. 5 km (3.1 mi) from the top, the first on the road 2'24" behind him were Kiryienka, Rodríguez, Rujano, and Bettini, who had consolidated into one group while Golčer, Nocentini, and Wegelius were dropped. The group of overall favorites was ten minutes back, and Visconti was eighteen minutes back, meaning his pink jersey was in jeopardy. Sella rode most of the rest of the climb out of the saddle, continuously adding to his advantage, which was four and a half minutes over Kiryienka in second on the stage. The four chasers behind him did not remain as a cohesive group; Kiryienka and Rodríguez came ahead of Rujano and Bettini, with Kiryienka attacking in the final kilometer to gain 30 seconds over Rodríguez. Bettini scarcely stayed ahead of the fast-charging group of overall favorites, finishing 49 seconds ahead of Denis Menchov, who led that group home. After the stage, Simoni criticized a perceived lack of combativeness in the riders who had been in the same group as him, calling them "a bunch of lambs."

As was expected, the stage greatly changed the overall classification, with LPR Brakes–Ballan's Gabriele Bosisio becoming the new race leader by a margin of five seconds over Contador. Contador had been unable to respond to attacks made by Menchov, Pellizotti, Riccò, and Simoni in the final kilometer, conceding some 45 seconds to them, but he was still the highest placed rider from that group in the overall standings at the end of the day.

Stage 14 result

| | Rider | Team | Time |
|---|---|---|---|
| 1 | Emanuele Sella (ITA) | CSF Group–Navigare | 5h 37' 14" |
| 2 | Vasil Kiryienka (BLR) | Tinkoff Credit Systems | + 4' 38" |
| 3 | Joaquim Rodríguez (ESP) | Caisse d'Epargne | + 5' 08" |
| 4 | José Rujano (VEN) | Caisse d'Epargne | + 7' 28" |
| 5 | Paolo Bettini (ITA) | Quick-Step | + 7' 59" |
| 6 | Denis Menchov (RUS) | Rabobank | + 8' 48" |
| 7 | Franco Pellizotti (ITA) | Liquigas | + 8' 57" |
| 8 | Riccardo Riccò (ITA) | Saunier Duval–Scott | + 8' 57" |
| 9 | Gilberto Simoni (ITA) | Diquigiovanni–Androni | + 9' 01" |
| 10 | Jurgen Van den Broeck (BEL) | Silence–Lotto | + 9' 01" |

General classification after stage 14

| | Rider | Team | Time |
|---|---|---|---|
| 1 | Gabriele Bosisio (ITA) | LPR Brakes–Ballan | 63h 10' 47" |
| 2 | Alberto Contador (ESP) | Astana | + 5" |
| 3 | Marzio Bruseghin (ITA) | Lampre | + 28" |
| 4 | Riccardo Riccò (ITA) | Saunier Duval–Scott | + 1' 02" |
| 5 | Danilo Di Luca (ITA) | LPR Brakes–Ballan | + 1' 07" |
| 6 | Andreas Klöden (GER) | Astana | + 1' 11" |
| 7 | Denis Menchov (RUS) | Rabobank | + 1' 18" |
| 8 | Gilberto Simoni (ITA) | Diquigiovanni–Androni | + 1' 31" |
| 9 | Franco Pellizotti (ITA) | Liquigas | + 1' 32" |
| 10 | Giovanni Visconti (ITA) | Quick-Step | + 1' 35" |

== Stage 15 ==
25 May 2008 — Arabba to Passo Fedaia, 153 km (95 mi)

This stage was one of the most climbing-intensive in the race, featuring six categorized climbs. These included three second category climbs, two in the third category, and a never before used uphill finish at Passo Fedaia, a first category climb.

A flurry of attacks and counter-attacks on the slopes of the day's first climb, the second category Passo Pordoi, reached after just 9 km (5.6 mi) spent racing, resulted in a nine-man leading group forming. The first attacker was Joaquim Rodríguez, who drew mountains classification leader Emanuele Sella with him. Their leading group also included Félix Cárdenas, Jens Voigt, Vladimir Miholjević, Evgeni Petrov, Vladimir Karpets, Fortunato Baliani, and Paolo Bettini. Through the second category Passo San Peligrino and the third category San Tomaso Agordino, the group's advantage hovered at around two minutes, as Sella, Bettini, Rodríguez, and Karpets all potentially posed threats to the GC should the group get a large advantage.

On the Passo de Giau, the course's third and final second category climb, the leading group splintered. Rodríguez, Baliani, and Sella came clear, and the other six members of the initial breakaway were absorbed by a chase group composed partly of overall contenders Alberto Contador, Danilo Di Luca, Franco Pellizotti, and Gilberto Simoni. Notably missing from this group was overnight race leader Gabriele Bosisio, who would finish the day eighteen minutes behind the stage winner and lose the pink jersey. Contador was briefly gapped on the climb, but he and Jurgen Van den Broeck caught up to the 15 others in the leading group after the summit, approximately three minutes behind the three leaders.

Vincenzo Nibali and Julio Alberto Pérez came out of this group and after a lengthy chase bridged to the leaders. This gave CSF Group–Navigare three riders in the leading group, and Baliani and Pérez worked to get Sella to the top of the Passo Falzarego first for maximum mountains points and a leading gap. Sella stayed away for the stage win, while the group of favorites caught his two teammates and Nibali, and stayed between two and three minutes behind him for the remainder of the stage. In the steep final kilometer before the summit of the Passo Fedaia, Riccardo Riccò put in an attack that Di Luca, Contador, and Denis Menchov were unable to answer, gaining him time on his competition. Contador, however, took the pink jersey, by a margin of 33 seconds over Riccò.

Stage 15 result

| | Rider | Team | Time |
|---|---|---|---|
| 1 | Emanuele Sella (ITA) | CSF Group–Navigare | 4h 53' 24" |
| 2 | Domenico Pozzovivo (ITA) | CSF Group–Navigare | + 2' 05" |
| 3 | Riccardo Riccò (ITA) | Saunier Duval–Scott | + 2' 11" |
| 4 | Danilo Di Luca (ITA) | LPR Brakes–Ballan | + 2' 20" |
| 5 | Gilberto Simoni (ITA) | Diquigiovanni–Androni | + 2' 27" |
| 6 | Alberto Contador (ESP) | Astana | + 2' 27" |
| 7 | Denis Menchov (RUS) | Rabobank | + 2' 34" |
| 8 | Jurgen Van den Broeck (BEL) | Silence–Lotto | + 3' 18" |
| 9 | Marzio Bruseghin (ITA) | Lampre | + 3' 22" |
| 10 | Tadej Valjavec (SLO) | Ag2r–La Mondiale | + 3' 27" |

General classification after stage 15

| | Rider | Team | Time |
|---|---|---|---|
| 1 | Alberto Contador (ESP) | Astana | 68h 06' 43" |
| 2 | Riccardo Riccò (ITA) | Saunier Duval–Scott | + 33" |
| 3 | Danilo Di Luca (ITA) | LPR Brakes–Ballan | + 55" |
| 4 | Marzio Bruseghin (ITA) | Lampre | + 1' 18" |
| 5 | Denis Menchov (RUS) | Rabobank | + 1' 20" |
| 6 | Gilberto Simoni (ITA) | Diquigiovanni–Androni | + 1' 26" |
| 7 | Franco Pellizotti (ITA) | Liquigas | + 2' 27" |
| 8 | Jurgen Van den Broeck (BEL) | Silence–Lotto | + 2' 50" |
| 9 | Domenico Pozzovivo (ITA) | CSF Group–Navigare | + 4' 04" |
| 10 | Emanuele Sella (ITA) | CSF Group–Navigare | + 4' 41" |

== Stage 16 ==
26 May 2008 — San Vigilio di Marebbe to Plan de Corones, 12.8 km (8.0 mi) (individual time trial)

This race against the clock was all uphill. It consisted entirely of the first category climb to Plan de Corones. Race organizers had tried to include this climb in 2006, but had to cut it short to a pass on lower elevation because of snow at the summit. The final 5 km (3.1 mi) were on a gravel road, and the last few hundred meters featured a grueling maximum gradient of 24%.

A strict 25% time cut was enforced on this stage, meaning that the less skilled climbers and time trialists needed to put in strong efforts just to be eligible to remain in the Giro. The first man to take the course, Markus Eichler, posted a time of 49' 58". This would more than likely survive any time cut, but the second, Thomas Fothen, did not stop the clock until 53' 48" had ticked by. This was the slowest time of the day and put Fothen, along with five others, outside the time limit, leading to their disqualification from the race.

The first competitive time was posted by CSF Group–Navigare rider Julio Alberto Pérez, who finished the course in 43' 22". The riders were staggered into three groups, and Pérez's time stood as best through the first two, after riders such as David Millar, Philip Deignan, and Vladimir Gusev came close but did not best it. The second rider of the third and final group was José Rujano, who posted a time of 41' 15", which easily beat the times that came before and held up for sixth at day's end. Emanuele Sella was the first rider to beat Rujano, as the top riders in the overall classification took to the course. Sella's time was 40' 32"; only Franco Pellizotti, at 40' 26", could beat him. For his stage win, Pellizotti was awarded a distinctive crown on the podium, as "King of Corones."

The remaining highly placed riders in the overall classification rounded out the top ten on the day, with race leader Alberto Contador gaining 8 seconds on Riccardo Riccò, more than 30 seconds on Marzio Bruseghin, and more than a minute on Danilo Di Luca and Denis Menchov, after they faltered on the unpaved section of the course.

Stage 16 result

| | Rider | Team | Time |
|---|---|---|---|
| 1 | Franco Pellizotti (ITA) | Liquigas | 40' 26" |
| 2 | Emanuele Sella (ITA) | CSF Group–Navigare | + 6" |
| 3 | Gilberto Simoni (ITA) | Diquigiovanni–Androni | + 17" |
| 4 | Alberto Contador (ESP) | Astana | + 22" |
| 5 | Riccardo Riccò (ITA) | Saunier Duval–Scott | + 30" |
| 6 | José Rujano (VEN) | Caisse d'Epargne | + 49" |
| 7 | Marzio Bruseghin (ITA) | Lampre | + 1' 04" |
| 8 | Domenico Pozzovivo (ITA) | CSF Group–Navigare | + 1' 43" |
| 9 | Danilo Di Luca (ITA) | LPR Brakes–Ballan | + 1' 45" |
| 10 | Denis Menchov (RUS) | Rabobank | + 1' 49" |

General classification after stage 16

| | Rider | Team | Time |
|---|---|---|---|
| 1 | Alberto Contador (ESP) | Astana | 68h 47' 31" |
| 2 | Riccardo Riccò (ITA) | Saunier Duval–Scott | + 41" |
| 3 | Gilberto Simoni (ITA) | Diquigiovanni–Androni | + 1' 21" |
| 4 | Marzio Bruseghin (ITA) | Lampre | + 2' 00" |
| 5 | Franco Pellizotti (ITA) | Liquigas | + 2' 05" |
| 6 | Danilo Di Luca (ITA) | LPR Brakes–Ballan | + 2' 18" |
| 7 | Denis Menchov (RUS) | Rabobank | + 2' 47" |
| 8 | Emanuele Sella (ITA) | CSF Group–Navigare | + 4' 25" |
| 9 | Jurgen Van den Broeck (BEL) | Silence–Lotto | + 4' 26" |
| 10 | Domenico Pozzovivo (ITA) | CSF Group–Navigare | + 5' 25" |

== Stage 17 ==
28 May 2008 — Sondrio to Locarno (Switzerland), 146 km (91 mi)

After the second rest day, the peloton faced the Giro's shortest road race stage, and the only stage which took the race out of its home country. It was categorized flat, with the third category Passo Monte Ceneri the only recognized climb on the course, coming 34 km (21 mi) before the finish in Switzerland.

A little after the 5 km (3.1 mi) mark of the stage, three riders broke away. These were Francesco Gavazzi, Mikhail Ignatiev, and Yann Huguet. The peloton let them get a big advantage quickly, 8'10" by the 26 km (16 mi) mark. At that point, the chase began in earnest. As the stage was quite short, it was unclear at first whether they would be caught, particularly as time trial specialist Ignatiev proved an effective pace setter for the break. Huguet was dropped on the Passo Monte Ceneri, and the flat section that followed the climb proved to be all the peloton needed to bring Ignatiev and Gavazzi back into the fold. Gavazzi was caught with 20 km (12 mi) left to race, while Ignatiev fought on, but was caught with 4.5 km (2.8 mi) to go. Alberto Ongarato started his sprint with nearly a full kilometer left to race, but he was chased down by Tony Martin, as Team High Road controlled the race's final kilometers much as they had in previous flat stages. André Greipel was the first around the final turn on the course, 250 m (820 ft) from the finish line, but instead of giving way to Mark Cavendish, the big German instead took the stage win himself, which had been Team High Road's plan. Thirteen riders who aggressively sought the stage win finished 4 seconds ahead of the rest of the peloton, but the overall classification was not changed in any significant way by the day's results.

Stage 17 result

| | Rider | Team | Time |
|---|---|---|---|
| 1 | André Greipel (GER) | Team High Road | 3h 27' 05" |
| 2 | Mark Cavendish (GBR) | Team High Road | s.t. |
| 3 | Daniele Bennati (ITA) | Liquigas | s.t. |
| 4 | Erik Zabel (GER) | Team Milram | s.t. |
| 5 | Assan Bazayev (KAZ) | Astana | s.t. |
| 6 | Alexandre Usov (BLR) | Ag2r–La Mondiale | s.t. |
| 7 | Enrico Gasparotto (ITA) | Barloworld | s.t. |
| 8 | Bram de Groot (NED) | Rabobank | s.t. |
| 9 | Alexander Serov (RUS) | Tinkoff Credit Systems | s.t. |
| 10 | Nikolay Trusov (RUS) | Tinkoff Credit Systems | s.t. |

General classification after stage 17

| | Rider | Team | Time |
|---|---|---|---|
| 1 | Alberto Contador (ESP) | Astana | 72h 14' 40" |
| 2 | Riccardo Riccò (ITA) | Saunier Duval–Scott | + 41" |
| 3 | Gilberto Simoni (ITA) | Diquigiovanni–Androni | + 1' 21" |
| 4 | Marzio Bruseghin (ITA) | Lampre | + 2' 00" |
| 5 | Franco Pellizotti (ITA) | Liquigas | + 2' 05" |
| 6 | Danilo Di Luca (ITA) | LPR Brakes–Ballan | + 2' 18" |
| 7 | Denis Menchov (RUS) | Rabobank | + 2' 47" |
| 8 | Emanuele Sella (ITA) | CSF Group–Navigare | +4' 25" |
| 9 | Jurgen Van den Broeck (BEL) | Silence–Lotto | + 4' 26" |
| 10 | Domenico Pozzovivo (ITA) | CSF Group–Navigare | + 5' 25" |

== Stage 18 ==
29 May 2008 — Mendrisio (Switzerland) to Varese, 147 km (91 mi)

This stage was also quite short, though it was hilly enough to be categorized medium-mountain. It used much of the same course that was used later in 2008 in the world championships road race. Favorites for the stage win thus included riders believed to be favorites for the world championships, such as two-time defending world champion Paolo Bettini.

A 12-rider group broke away after 6 km (3.7 mi) spent racing. This group included several notable riders – Bettini, Jens Voigt, points classification leader Daniele Bennati, and former race leaders Gabriele Bosisio and Giovanni Visconti. Voigt, the eventual stage winner, remarked after the stage that he had made it into "a good group." The peloton was uninterested in bringing them back, as none posed overall threats on such a short stage. Their advantage was just over six minutes, at the 36 km (22 mi) to go mark, when Voigt broke free of his mates and soloed over the last two laps of the circuit in Varese to reach the finish line. The remainder of the morning's escape finished scattered behind him, with Visconti 1'07" back and Nikolay Trusov in twelfth 5'19" back, as the hilly parcours took its toll on some riders. The peloton, led across the line by Lilian Jégou, finished 7'51" back.

Stage 18 result

| | Rider | Team | Time |
|---|---|---|---|
| 1 | Jens Voigt (GER) | Team CSC | 3h 22' 46" |
| 2 | Giovanni Visconti (ITA) | Quick-Step | + 1' 07" |
| 3 | Rinaldo Nocentini (ITA) | Ag2r–La Mondiale | + 1' 07" |
| 4 | Gabriele Bosisio (ITA) | LPR Brakes–Ballan | + 1' 07" |
| 5 | Daniele Bennati (ITA) | Liquigas | + 2' 04" |
| 6 | Paolo Bettini (ITA) | Quick-Step | + 2' 04" |
| 7 | Félix Cárdenas (COL) | Barloworld | + 2' 04" |
| 8 | Alan Pérez (ESP) | Euskaltel–Euskadi | + 2' 04" |
| 9 | Mauricio Ardila (COL) | Rabobank | + 2' 04" |
| 10 | Joaquim Rodríguez (ESP) | Caisse d'Epargne | + 2' 06" |

General classification after stage 18

| | Rider | Team | Time |
|---|---|---|---|
| 1 | Alberto Contador (ESP) | Astana | 75h 45' 17" |
| 2 | Riccardo Riccò (ITA) | Saunier Duval–Scott | + 41" |
| 3 | Gilberto Simoni (ITA) | Diquigiovanni–Androni | + 1' 21" |
| 4 | Marzio Bruseghin (ITA) | Lampre | + 2' 00" |
| 5 | Franco Pellizotti (ITA) | Liquigas | + 2' 05" |
| 6 | Danilo Di Luca (ITA) | LPR Brakes–Ballan | + 2' 18" |
| 7 | Denis Menchov (RUS) | Rabobank | + 2' 47" |
| 8 | Emanuele Sella (ITA) | CSF Group–Navigare | + 4' 25" |
| 9 | Jurgen Van den Broeck (BEL) | Silence–Lotto | + 4' 26" |
| 10 | Domenico Pozzovivo (ITA) | CSF Group–Navigare | + 5' 25" |

== Stage 19 ==
30 May 2008 — Legnano to Presolana, 238 km (148 mi)

It was back to the high mountains for Stage 19, the longest in this Giro. While the first 154 km (96 mi) of the course were mostly flat, the final 84 km (52 mi) featured three categorized climbs, two second category hills before the first category arrival at Monte Pora in Presolana. This climb had never before been visited in the Giro.

The first hour of the stage covered 50 km (31 mi) and kept any escape attempts from coming clear. The seven who broke away at that point were Alexander Efimkin, Steven Cummings, Kanstantsin Sivtsov, Gabriele Missaglia, Nicki Sørensen, Giairo Ermeti, and Vasil Kiryienka. An advantage that was at first hard-fought ballooned to 21 minutes at the 120 km (75 mi) mark. Rain began to fall as the breakaway started up the Passo del Vivione, still with an advantage of nearly 20 minutes. A selective chase group of some 40 riders formed when the peloton hit the climb.

At this point, Danilo Di Luca and teammate Paolo Savoldelli attacked from the group of 40 and managed to come clear, keeping an advantage of close to two minutes through the conclusion of the stage. As Di Luca began the stage 2'18" behind race leader Alberto Contador, the Spaniard's pink jersey was in jeopardy, and Di Luca was at times the "virtual" race leader, when he held an advantage of more than 2'18" over Contador's group. With 6 km (3.7 mi) left, Contador himself launched an attack, but he was unable to get away. Riccardo Riccò counter-attacked when Contador was brought back, and nearly put enough time into him to take the pink jersey.

In the leading group, Kiryienka attacked his six breakaway companions at the foot of the Monte Para climb and soloed to the finish for the win, by a margin of over four minutes. Di Luca passed the other remaining breakaway riders and took second on the stage. Di Luca finished 1'45" ahead of Contador's group and Riccò crossed the line 37 seconds before them, meaning the top three were again very tightly bunched.

Stage 19 result

| | Rider | Team | Time |
|---|---|---|---|
| 1 | Vasil Kiryienka (BLR) | Tinkoff Credit Systems | 6h 37' 32" |
| 2 | Danilo Di Luca (ITA) | LPR Brakes–Ballan | + 4' 36" |
| 3 | Alexander Efimkin (RUS) | Quick-Step | + 4' 43" |
| 4 | Steve Cummings (GBR) | Barloworld | + 5' 25" |
| 5 | Riccardo Riccò (ITA) | Saunier Duval–Scott | + 5' 44" |
| 6 | Emanuele Sella (ITA) | CSF Group–Navigare | + 6' 21" |
| 7 | Franco Pellizotti (ITA) | Liquigas | + 6' 21" |
| 8 | Jurgen Van den Broeck (BEL) | Silence–Lotto | + 6' 21" |
| 9 | Marzio Bruseghin (ITA) | Lampre | + 6' 21" |
| 10 | Denis Menchov (RUS) | Rabobank | + 6' 21" |

General classification after stage 19

| | Rider | Team | Time |
|---|---|---|---|
| 1 | Alberto Contador (ESP) | Astana | 82h 29' 10" |
| 2 | Riccardo Riccò (ITA) | Saunier Duval–Scott | + 4" |
| 3 | Danilo Di Luca (ITA) | LPR Brakes–Ballan | + 21" |
| 4 | Marzio Bruseghin (ITA) | Lampre | + 2' 00" |
| 5 | Franco Pellizotti (ITA) | Liquigas | + 2' 05" |
| 6 | Denis Menchov (RUS) | Rabobank | + 2' 47" |
| 7 | Emanuele Sella (ITA) | CSF Group–Navigare | + 4' 25" |
| 8 | Jurgen Van den Broeck (BEL) | Silence–Lotto | + 4' 26" |
| 9 | Domenico Pozzovivo (ITA) | CSF Group–Navigare | + 5' 25" |
| 10 | Gilberto Simoni (ITA) | Diquigiovanni–Androni | + 7' 18" |

== Stage 20 ==
31 May 2008 — Rovetta to Tirano, 224 km (139 mi)

This stage offered one last visit to the high mountains for the 2008 Giro. While it was the only classified mountain stage not to end on a climb, the categorization as a high mountain stage came about because it featured the highest point reached in the Giro and its steepest climb, respectively the Passo di Gavia and the Passo del Mortirolo. The visit to the Passo di Gavia marked twenty years since it was famously conquered by Andrew Hampsten in a driving blizzard en route to his overall victory in the 1988 Giro d'Italia.

For over two hours, no one so much as attempted a breakaway on this stage. Gabriele Bosisio was the first rider to come clear, at the 70 km (43 mi) mark, but Astana, unwilling to let him potentially help teammate Danilo Di Luca, kept his advantage at under 30 seconds before he was eventually caught. Finally, after 100 km (62 mi) had already been covered, eight riders established leading groups. Three, Julio Alberto Pérez, José Rujano, and Evgeni Petrov were in the lead with the other five, Alessandro Spezialetti, Antonio Colom, Félix Cárdenas, Fortunato Baliani, and Charly Wegelius, behind them chasing. They did not stay as two cohesive groups for very long, and they climbed the Passo di Gavia in pairs or alone. Pérez was the first to its summit, claiming maximum points for conquering the Cima Coppi.

As the ascent to the Passo del Mortirolo began, three groups had formed. Pérez, Baliani, and Colom were in the lead, as the latter two had caught Pérez shortly after he crested the Passo di Gavia. Trailing by 3'35" were Petrov, Cárdenas, Wegelius and Rujano, with a group of overall favorites and support riders from their teams at 5'20". A short while into the climb, the favorites caught the group of five. Pérez was unable to stay with either the leaders for long on the Mortirolo, and he would be dropped by the pink jersey group as well, eventually finishing the stage eleven minutes back in the first large group. Baliani was then dropped from the lead, though he was able to stay with the pink jersey group and finished the stage seventh. Eventually Colom was also caught, though he too stayed with the overall favorites to the finish.

Emanuele Sella and Riccardo Riccò traded attacks and verbal jabs at the head of the group of favorites as they began the Mortirolo climb. This dropped a few riders from the pink jersey group, but most of the overall favorites remained. The notable exception was Danilo Di Luca, who lost nearly four minutes on the stage and any chance to repeat as Giro champion. Sella and Gilberto Simoni got a gap on the remaining overall favorites, with Sella safely away for the stage win in Tirano. Riccò narrowly missed the time bonus for third on the stage, which would have given him the pink jersey. He and race leader Alberto Contador entered the final stage individual time trial by only 4 seconds, but with Contador recognized as the far superior rider against the clock, the Giro was all but won by the Spaniard at this point.

Stage 20 result

| | Rider | Team | Time |
|---|---|---|---|
| 1 | Emanuele Sella (ITA) | CSF Group–Navigare | 6h 52' 35" |
| 2 | Gilberto Simoni (ITA) | Diquigiovanni–Androni | + 1' 04" |
| 3 | Joaquim Rodríguez (ESP) | Caisse d'Epargne | + 1' 22" |
| 4 | Riccardo Riccò (ITA) | Saunier Duval–Scott | + 1' 30" |
| 5 | Alberto Contador (ESP) | Astana | + 1' 30" |
| 6 | Antonio Colom (ESP) | Astana | + 1' 30" |
| 7 | Fortunato Baliani (ITA) | CSF Group–Navigare | + 1' 30" |
| 8 | Marzio Bruseghin (ITA) | Lampre | + 1' 30" |
| 9 | Tadej Valjavec (SLO) | Ag2r–La Mondiale | + 1' 30" |
| 10 | Franco Pellizotti (ITA) | Liquigas | + 1' 30" |

General classification after stage 20

| | Rider | Team | Time |
|---|---|---|---|
| 1 | Alberto Contador (ESP) | Astana | 89h 23' 25" |
| 2 | Riccardo Riccò (ITA) | Saunier Duval–Scott | + 4" |
| 3 | Marzio Bruseghin (ITA) | Lampre | + 2' 00" |
| 4 | Franco Pellizotti (ITA) | Liquigas | + 2' 05" |
| 5 | Emanuele Sella (ITA) | CSF Group–Navigare | + 2' 35" |
| 6 | Denis Menchov (RUS) | Rabobank | + 2' 47" |
| 7 | Danilo Di Luca (ITA) | LPR Brakes–Ballan | + 4' 18" |
| 8 | Jurgen Van den Broeck (BEL) | Silence–Lotto | + 4' 26" |
| 9 | Domenico Pozzovivo (ITA) | CSF Group–Navigare | + 5' 25" |
| 10 | Gilberto Simoni (ITA) | Diquigiovanni–Androni | + 6' 40" |

== Stage 21 ==
1 June 2008 — Milan, 28.5 km (17.7 mi) (individual time trial)

The final stage of the 2008 Giro was an individual time trial in Milan. This was the first time since 1992 that the Giro had not concluded with a road race stage. The course was on a slight downhill for its duration and was not technical, featuring only a small number of turns and several long straightaways.

Though the overall victory was likely decided, as race leader Alberto Contador was seen as a superior time trialist to the second-place man Riccardo Riccò, several lower positions in the classification were up for grabs. Entering the day, Marzio Bruseghin and Franco Pellizotti were separated by only 5 seconds for the last step on the podium. Additionally, Denis Menchov trailed Emanuele Sella by 12 seconds for fifth, and Danilo Di Luca's lead over Jurgen Van den Broeck for seventh was only 8 seconds, all margins which were surmountable in the time trial.

The stage was almost won by Mikhail Ignatiev, the second man to start as the second-to-last man in the overnight standings and recognized as a solid time trialist. He finished the course in 32'55", a time which was only bested Tony Martin and his teammate Marco Pinotti, the stage winner with a time of 32'45".

The overall favorites took the course some time later not to decide the stage, but their own battle for specific placings. Contador, who finished the stage in eleventh, was clearly the strongest of the overall contenders on the day, bettering Riccò at the first time check by 53 seconds, Bruseghin by 33 seconds, and Pellizotti by 28 seconds. This momentarily put Bruseghin and Pellizotti in a tie for third overall. Menchov and Van Den Broeck both comfortably outrode their rivals to claim fifth and seventh overall, respectively. At the second intermediate time check, Pellizotti moved five seconds ahead of Bruseghin, but by the finish, Bruseghin had reclaimed the final podium spot by a margin of just two seconds.

Stage 21 result

| | Rider | Team | Time |
|---|---|---|---|
| 1 | Marco Pinotti (ITA) | Team High Road | 32' 45" |
| 2 | Tony Martin (GER) | Team High Road | + 7" |
| 3 | Mikhail Ignatiev (RUS) | Tinkoff Credit Systems | + 10" |
| 4 | Bradley Wiggins (GBR) | Team High Road | + 13" |
| 5 | Christian Vande Velde (USA) | Slipstream–Chipotle | + 22" |
| 6 | Danny Pate (USA) | Slipstream–Chipotle | + 24" |
| 7 | Daniele Bennati (ITA) | Liquigas | + 24" |
| 8 | Steve Cummings (GBR) | Barloworld | + 24" |
| 9 | Vladimir Gusev (RUS) | Astana | + 31" |
| 10 | Jens Voigt (GER) | Team CSC | + 33" |

Final General Classification

| | Rider | Team | Time |
|---|---|---|---|
| 1 | Alberto Contador (ESP) | Astana | 89h 56' 49" |
| 2 | Riccardo Riccò (ITA) | Saunier Duval–Scott | + 1' 57" |
| 3 | Marzio Bruseghin (ITA) | Lampre | + 2' 54" |
| 4 | Franco Pellizotti (ITA) | Liquigas | + 2' 56" |
| 5 | Denis Menchov (RUS) | Rabobank | + 3' 37" |
| 6 | Emanuele Sella (ITA) | CSF Group–Navigare | + 4' 31" |
| 7 | Jurgen Van den Broeck (BEL) | Silence–Lotto | + 6' 30" |
| 8 | Danilo Di Luca (ITA) | LPR Brakes–Ballan | + 7' 15" |
| 9 | Domenico Pozzovivo (ITA) | CSF Group–Navigare | + 7' 53" |
| 10 | Gilberto Simoni (ITA) | Diquigiovanni–Androni | + 11' 03" |
