= Alessandro Maserati =

Italian cyclist

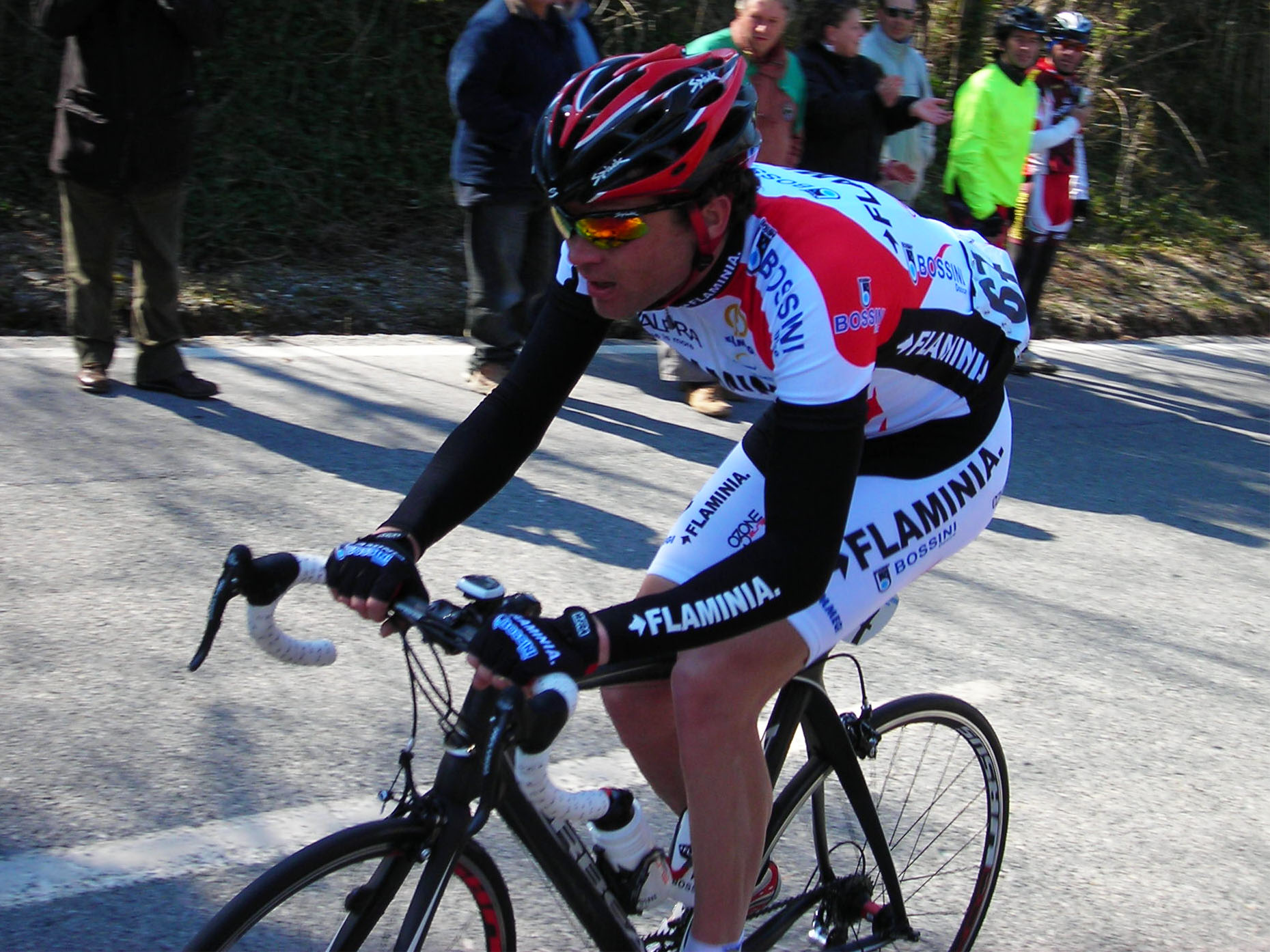
- Alessandro Maserati at the 2009 Milan–San Remo

Personal information
- Born: 8 September 1979 (age 47) Castel San Giovanni, Italy
- Height: 1.8 m (5 ft 11 in)
- Weight: 74 kg (163 lb)

Cycling career
- Sport: Cycling
- Current team: Retired
- Discipline: Road
- Role: Rider

Professional teams
- 2005–2008: LPR–Piacenza
- 2009–2010: Ceramica Flaminia–Bossini Docce

Alessandro Maserati (born 8 September 1979) is an Italian former professional road cyclist.

== Major results ==
2006
10th Châteauroux Classic
2007
10th Giro del Mendrisiotto
2008
4th Overall Giro della Provincia di Grosseto
2009
10th Ronde van Drenthe
2010
10th GP Costa Degli Etruschi
