= Silvère Ackermann =

Swiss cyclist

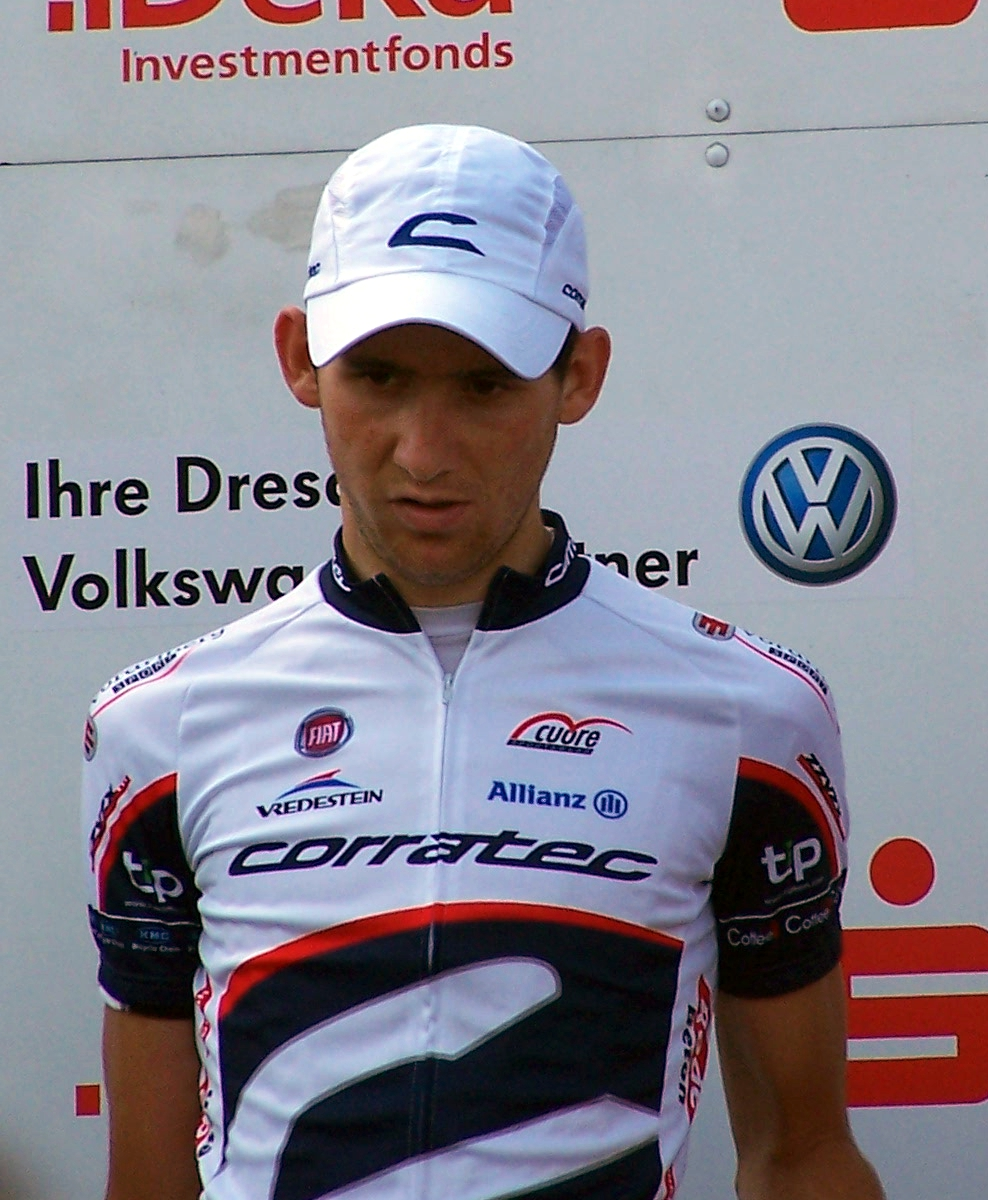

Personal information
- Born: 30 December 1984 (age 41) Montreal, Quebec, Canada

Cycling career
- Sport: Cycling
- Current team: Retired
- Discipline: Road
- Role: Rider

Amateur teams
- 2005–2006: MegaBike–Macom
- 2007: SCO Dijon Lapierre

Professional teams
- 2008: NGC Medical–OTC Industria Porte
- 2009–2010: Vorarlberg–Corratec

Silvère Ackermann (born 30 December 1984) is a Swiss former cyclist.

== Major results ==
2007
3rd Tour du Jura
6th Overall Tour Alsace
7th Overall Rhône-Alpes Isère Tour
2008
5th Tour du Jura
9th GP du canton d'Argovie
2009
5th Tour du Jura
