= Roger Beuchat =

Swiss cyclist

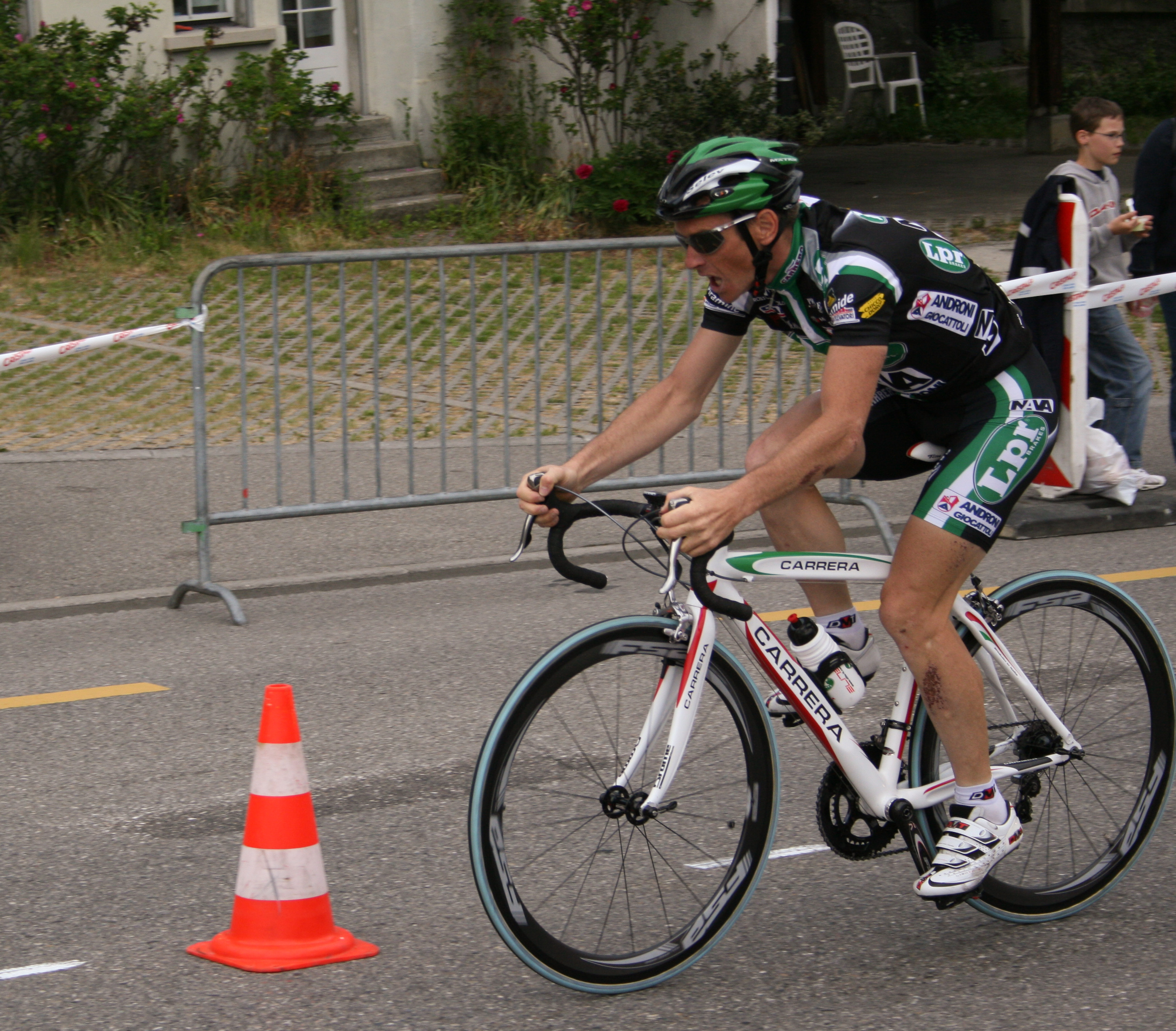

Personal information
- Born: 2 January 1972 (age 54) Court, Switzerland

Cycling career
- Sport: Cycling
- Current team: Retired
- Discipline: Road
- Role: Rider

Professional teams
- 1998–2000: Post Swiss Team
- 2001–2003: Phonak
- 2004: Vini Caldirola–Nobili Rubinetterie
- 2005: Barloworld
- 2006–2007: Team LPR
- 2008: Diquigiovanni–Androni
- 2009: Team Neotel
- 2010–2011: CKT TMIT–Champion System

Roger Beuchat (born 2 January 1972 in Court, Switzerland) is a Swiss retired cyclist.

== Palmares ==
2000
1st Stage 1 Giro della Svizzera Meridionale
1st Stage 2 Tour du Poitou-Charentes
1st Stage 2 3-Länder-Tour
3rd Swiss National Road Race Championships
3rd Giro della Svizzera Meridionale
2001
1st Grand Prix de Genève
1st Tour du Jura
3rd Tour du Lac Léman
2002
2nd National Road Race Championships
2003
2nd National Road Race Championships
2004
3rd Overall Peace Race
2009
1st Overall Tour de Korea
1st Tour du Jura
5th Tour du Doubs
