= Sacha Modolo =

Italian racing cyclist

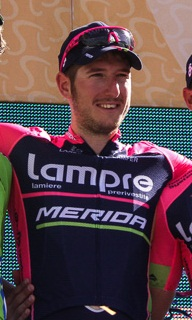
- Modolo in 2014

Personal information
- Full name: Sacha Modolo
- Born: 19 June 1987 (age 39) Conegliano, Italy
- Height: 1.8 m (5 ft 11 in)
- Weight: 67 kg (148 lb)

Cycling career
- Sport: Cycling
- Current team: Bardiani–CSF 7 Saber
- Discipline: Road
- Role: Rider
- Rider type: Sprinter

Professional teams
- 2010–2013: Colnago–CSF Inox
- 2014–2017: Lampre–Merida
- 2018–2019: EF Education First–Drapac p/b Cannondale
- 2020–2021: Alpecin–Fenix
- 2022–: Bardiani–CSF–Faizanè

Major wins
- Grand Tours Giro d'Italia 2 individual stages (2015) Stage races Tour of Hainan (2015) One-day races and Classics Grand Prix of Aargau Canton (2017)

Sacha Modolo (born 19 June 1987) is an Italian road racing cyclist, who currently rides for UCI ProTeam Bardiani–CSF 7 Saber.

== Career ==
=== Colnago-CSF (2010–2013) ===
In the spring of 2010, he sprinted his way to fourth place in the cycling monument Milan – San Remo, registering a prestigious placing. He followed the near-wins of 2010 with victories in 2011, seemingly akin to winning stages in pair in races such as the Danmark Rundt, the Tour of Qinghai Lake, the Settimana Ciclistica Lombarda and the Giro di Padania. In 2012, as he and his teammates were competing for a spot at the start of the Giro d'Italia, Modolo won stage 6 of the Tour of Turkey with a sprint. When he crossed the line, he put his thumb in his mouth, dedicating his victory to his pregnant girlfriend.

In 2013, Modolo started the year by winning the second stage of the Tour de San Luis, beating fellow sprinter Mark Cavendish (Omega Pharma–Quick-Step) on the slightly uphill finish which featured some twist and turns. Modolo admitted after the stage that he learned about the specifics of the arrival by chatting with other riders during the race.

=== Lampre-Merida (2014–2017) ===
Modolo left Bardiani Valvole–CSF Inox at the end of the 2013 season, and joined Lampre–Merida for the 2014 season. In 2015, Modolo opened his account on the fifth stage of the Tour of Turkey, winning the sprint on the rising finishing straight. He banked his first two victories in a Grand Tour at the Giro d'Italia, Stages 13 and 16. He said of his victory on Stage 13 that it was his destiny to win in Jesolo since it is his home region.

=== EF Education First–Drapac (2018–2019) ===
In September 2017, it was announced that Modolo would join the EF Education First–Drapac p/b Cannondale team for the 2018 season.

== Major results ==
2004
3rd Road race, National Junior Road Championships
2005
7th Road race, UCI Juniors World Championships
2006
1st Giro del Casentino
2007
1st Trofeo Città di San Vendemiano
2008
3rd Coppa San Geo
2009
1st Giro del Belvedere
1st Gran Premio della Liberazione
3rd Road race, UEC European Under-23 Road Championships
3rd Trofeo Franco Balestra
9th Trofeo Alcide Degasperi
2010
3rd Giro del Veneto
4th Milan–San Remo
4th Giro del Friuli
6th Gran Premio Città di Misano – Adriatico
7th Dutch Food Valley Classic
2011
1st Coppa Ugo Agostoni
Danmark Rundt

1st Stages 1 & 4

Tour of Qinghai Lake

1st Stages 5 & 9

Settimana Ciclistica Lombarda

1st Stages 2 & 3

Giro di Padania

1st Stages 1 & 3

1st Stage 5 Brixia Tour
2nd Overall Ronde van Drenthe
2nd London–Surrey Cycle Classic
2012
1st Coppa Bernocchi
1st Points classification Circuit de la Sarthe
Tour of Austria

1st Stages 3 & 6

1st Stage 6 Tour of Turkey
Monviso-Venezia — Il Padania

1st Stages 1b (TTT) & 2

2nd Gran Premio della Costa Etruschi
9th Volta Limburg Classic
2013
1st Coppa Bernocchi
1st Memorial Marco Pantani
Tour of Qinghai Lake

1st Points classification
1st Stages 1, 4, 8, 9, 11 & 12

1st Stage 2 Tour de San Luis
2nd London–Surrey Classic
2014
1st Trofeo Palma
1st Trofeo Ses Salines
Three Days of De Panne

1st Points classification
1st Stages 2 & 3a

1st Stage 5 Tour de Suisse
1st Stage 5 Tour of Beijing
1st Stage 1 Volta ao Algarve
1st Stage 7 Tour de San Luis
4th Trofeo Muro-Port d'Alcúdia
8th Milan–San Remo
2015
1st Overall Tour of Hainan

1st Points classification
1st Stages 3 & 4

Giro d'Italia

1st Stages 13 & 17

1st Stage 5 Tour of Turkey
6th Gran Piemonte
9th Grand Prix de Fourmies
2016
Presidential Tour of Turkey

1st Stages 4 & 7

1st Stage 2 Czech Cycling Tour
4th Brussels Cycling Classic
2017
1st Grand Prix of Aargau Canton
Tour of Croatia

1st Stages 1 & 6

1st Stage 2 Tour de Pologne
3rd Coppa Bernocchi
6th Tour of Flanders
10th Gent–Wevelgem
2018
1st Stage 3 Vuelta a Andalucía
7th EuroEyes Cyclassics
2021
1st Stage 3 Tour de Luxembourg

=== Grand Tour general classification results timeline ===
| Grand Tour | 2010 | 2011 | 2012 | 2013 | 2014 | 2015 | 2016 | 2017 | 2018 | 2019 | 2020 | 2021 | 2022 |
|---|---|---|---|---|---|---|---|---|---|---|---|---|---|
| Giro d'Italia | DNF | DNF | 138 | 125 | — | 126 | 84 | DNF | 88 | DNF | — | — | 114 |
| Tour de France | — | — | — | — | DNF | — | — | — | — | — | — | — | — |
| Vuelta a España | — | — | — | — | — | — | — | 131 | — | — | — | DNF | — |

Legend
| — | Did not compete |
| DNF | Did not finish |
