= Giairo Ermeti =

Italian cyclist

Personal information
- Full name: Giairo Ermeti
- Born: 7 April 1981 (age 45) Rottofreno, Italy

Cycling career
- Sport: Cycling
- Current team: Retired
- Discipline: Road
- Role: Rider

Amateur team
- 2003: Palazzago Zoccorinese

Professional teams
- 2005: Miche
- 2006: Team LPR
- 2007: Tenax
- 2008–2009: LPR Brakes–Ballan
- 2010: De Rosa–Stac Plastic
- 2011–2013: Androni Giocattoli

Giairo Ermeti (born 7 April 1981 in Rottofreno) is an Italian former professional road bicycle racer, who competed as a professional between 2005 and 2013.

Ermeti retired at the end of the 2013 season.

== Palmarès ==
2003
1st, Stage 3, Giro del Friuli Venezia Giulia, Lignano Sabbiadoro
2004
1st, National Road Championships, Elite without contract
1st Stage 1 Volta a Lleida
1st, Giro Internazionale del Valdarno
1st, Piccolo Giro di Lombardia
2006
1st, Giro del Lago Maggiore-GP Knorr
2007
National Track Championships, Dalmine

1st, Individual Pursuit
1st, Team Pursuit (with Claudio Cucinotta, Matteo Montaguti and Alessandro De Marchi)
1st, Scratch

=== Grand Tour general classification results timeline ===
Grand Tour	2008	2009	2010	2011	2012	2013
Giro d'Italia	83	138	—	144	—	151
Tour de France	—	—	—	—	—	—
Vuelta a España	—	—	—	—	—	—

Legend
—	Did not compete
DNF	Did not finish
