= Fabrice Piemontesi =

Italian cyclist

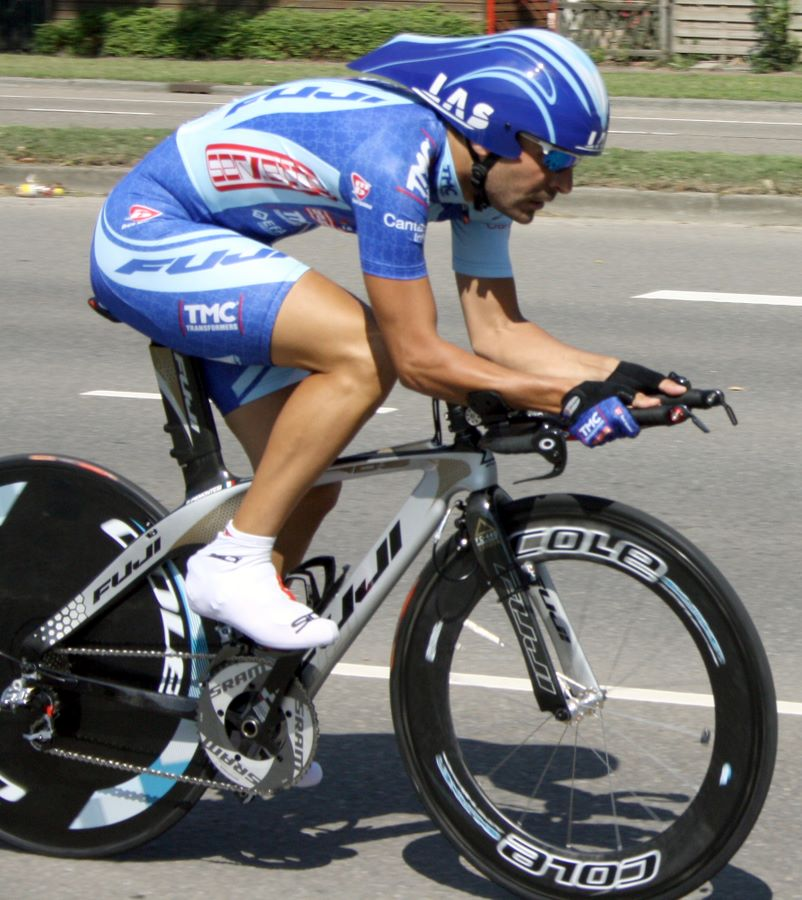
- Piemontesi riding in the 2009 Eneco Tour

Personal information
- Born: 16 August 1983 (age 43) Sion, Switzerland
- Height: 1.71 m (5 ft 7 in)
- Weight: 61 kg (134 lb)

Cycling career
- Sport: Cycling
- Discipline: Road
- Role: Rider

Professional teams
- 2007: Tenax-Menikini
- 2008: NGC Medical–OTC Industria Porte
- 2009: Teltek H2O
- Fuji–Servetto
- 2010: Androni Giocattoli

Fabrice Piemontesi (born 16 August 1983) is an Italian professional road bicycle racer.

== Palmarès ==
2004
1st Trofeo Edil C
2009
9th Giro della Romagna
2010
2nd Gran Premio Nobili Rubinetterie – Coppa Papà Carlo
