= Simone Campagnaro =

Italian road bicycle racer

Personal information
- Full name: Simone Campagnaro
- Born: 31 May 1986 (age 40) Latina, Italy

Cycling career
- Sport: Cycling
- Current team: Nippo–Vini Fantini–Faizanè
- Discipline: Road
- Role: Rider
- Rider type: All-rounder

Professional teams
- 2010: Miche
- 2011–: D'Angelo & Antenucci–Nippo

Simone Campagnaro (Italian pronunciation: [kampaɲˈɲaːro]; born 31 May 1986 in Latina, in the Lazio region, central Italy) is an Italian road bicycle racer currently riding for Nippo–Vini Fantini–Faizanè.

== Palmares highlights ==
2011

3rd Overall Tour de Hokkaido

2012
4th Overall Tour de la Guadeloupe

1st Stage 4

2013
4th Overall Tour de Kumano
7th Gran Premio Nobili Rubinetterie
