= Cristiano Fumagalli =

Italian cyclist (born 1984)

Personal information
- Born: 28 July 1984 (age 42) Varese, Italy

Cycling career
- Sport: Cycling
- Current team: Retired
- Discipline: Road
- Role: Rider

Professional teams
- 2008–2010: Ceramica Flaminia–Bossini Docce
- 2011–2012: Miche–Guerciotti

Cristiano Fumagalli (born 28 July 1984 in Varese) is an Italian former professional road cyclist.

== Major results ==
2002
6th GP dell'Arno
2003
2nd Gran Premio Inda
3rd Giro del Canavese
2005
7th Giro del Canavese
2006
1st Coppa Città di San Daniele
2nd Giro del Canavese
3rd Gran Premio della Liberazione
4th Trofeo Città di Brescia
2007
3rd Trofeo Alcide Degasperi
5th Coppa San Geo
8th Giro Ciclistico del Cigno
2008
3rd Trofeo Melinda
10th Giro del Piemonte
2010
8th Memorial Marco Pantani
