= Luigi Sestili =

Personal information
- Born: 9 July 1983 (age 43) Civitavecchia, Italy

Cycling career
- Sport: Cycling
- Current team: Retired
- Discipline: Road
- Role: Rider

Professional teams
- 2005: Naturino–Sapore di Mare (stagiaire)
- 2006–2007: Naturino–Sapore di Mare
- 2008–2009: Ceramica Flaminia–Bossini Docce

Luigi Sestili (born 9 July 1983) is an Italian former professional road cyclist.

== Major results ==
2004
1st Stage 5 Thüringen Rundfahrt der U23
1st Young rider classification, Triptyque Ardennais
4th Road race, National Under-23 Road Championships
6th Ronde van Vlaanderen U23
7th Gran Premio della Liberazione
7th Grand Prix Joseph Bruyère
2005
1st Overall Giro delle Regioni

1st Stage 2

3rd GP Capodarco
3rd Cronoscalata Internazionale Gardone
4th GP Palio del Recioto
4th Coppa Colli Briantei Internazionale
5th Ruota d'Oro
2006
9th Overall Circuit de Lorraine
2007
3rd Giro del Medio Brenta
2008
9th GP Industria & Artigianato
10th Trofeo Matteotti
