= Donato Cannone =

Italian cyclist

Personal information
- Born: 16 February 1982 (age 44) Terlizzi, Italy

Cycling career
- Sport: Cycling
- Current team: Retired
- Discipline: Road
- Role: Rider

Amateur team
- 2004–2005: Futura–Matricardi

Professional teams
- 2006: CB Immobiliare–Universal Caffé
- 2007–2008: OTC Doors–Lauretana
- 2009: Betonexpressz 2000–Limonta
- 2010: Ceramica Flaminia

Donato Cannone (born 16 February 1982 in Terlizzi) is an Italian former professional road cyclist.

== Major results ==
2004
7th Ruota d'Oro
2005
3rd Overall Giro della Toscana
1st Stage 1 Giro della Toscana
2006
3rd Overall Vuelta a Navarra
2007
7th Overall Circuit de Lorraine
2008
4th Giro del Veneto
5th Coppa Placci
7th Coppa Bernocchi
2009
10th GP Industria & Artigianato di Larciano
