= Claudio Cucinotta =

Italian cyclist

Personal information
- Born: January 22, 1982 (age 44) Latisana, Italy

Cycling career
- Sport: Cycling
- Current team: Retired
- Discipline: Road
- Role: Rider

Professional teams
- 2006-2007: Tenax
- 2008-2009: LPR Brakes
- 2010: De Rosa-Stac Plastic

Claudio Cucinotta (born 22 January 1982) is an Italian cyclist.

== Palmares ==
2007
National Team Pursuit Champion (with Alessandro De Marchi, Giairo Ermeti and Matteo Montaguti)
6th Scheldeprijs
9th Paris–Bruxelles
2008
National Scratch Champion
1st Stage 1 Tour of Slovenia
2010
1st Stages 3 & 7 Tour of Japan
8th GP Costa Degli Etruschi
