= Dwars door Drenthe =

Dutch one-day road cycling race

Race details
- Date: March
- Region: Drenthe, Netherlands
- English name: Across Drenthe
- Local name(s): Dwars door Drenthe
- Discipline: Road race
- Competition: UCI Europe Tour
- Type: Single day race
- Web site: www.rondevandrenthe.nl

History
- First edition: 2010
- Editions: 5
- Final edition: 2015
- First winner: Enrico Rossi (ITA)
- Most wins: No repeat winners
- Final winner: Manuel Belletti (ITA)

Dwars door Drenthe (English: Across Drenthe) was an elite men's road bicycle racing event held annually in the Drenthe, Netherlands, and sanctioned by the Royal Dutch Cycling Union. It took place between 2010 and 2015.

From 2010, the men's event was UCI 1.1 rated and was part of the UCI Europe Tour. In 2011, the race was held as part of an expanded 2.1 rated Ronde van Drenthe, in which Dwars door Drenthe was held the day before the Ronde itself. The two races reverted to a stand-alone format for the 2012 edition. After the race was cancelled in 2013 due to snow, the race continued for two more years. The 2015 edition was won by Manuel Belletti (Southeast Pro Cycling); this turned out to be the final edition as the race's cancellation was announced the following September.

== Winners ==
Year	Country	Rider	Team
2010	Italy	Enrico Rossi	Ceramica Flaminia
2011	Netherlands	Kenny van Hummel	Skil–Shimano
2012	Netherlands	Theo Bos	Rabobank
2013	No race due to snow		
2014	Italy	Simone Ponzi	Neri Sottoli
2015	Italy	Manuel Belletti	Southeast Pro Cycling
