= Marco Cattaneo (cyclist, born 1982) =

Italian cyclist

Personal information
- Born: 5 June 1982 (age 44) Milan, Italy

Cycling career
- Sport: Cycling
- Discipline: Road
- Role: Rider

Professional teams
- 2008: NGC Medical–OTC Industria Porte
- 2009: LPR Brakes–Farnese Vini
- 2010: De Rosa–Stac Plastic

Marco Cattaneo (born 5 June 1982) is an Italian former professional road cyclist.

== Major results ==
2006
2nd Circuito del Porto
3rd Overall Giro Ciclistico d'Italia
2007
1st Coppa della Pace
2nd Overall Giro della Toscana
8th Piccolo Giro di Lombardia
2008
9th Overall Brixia Tour
