= Sergio Laganà =

Italian cyclist

Personal information
- Born: 4 November 1982 (age 43) Reggio Calabria, Italy

Cycling career
- Sport: Cycling
- Current team: Retired
- Discipline: Road
- Role: Rider

Professional teams
- 2007: Tenax–Menikini
- 2008–2009: LPR Brakes–Ballan
- 2010–2012: De Rosa–Stac Plastic

Sergio Laganà (born 4 November 1982) is an Italian former professional road cyclist.

== Major results ==
2008
1st Stage 2 Tour Ivoirien de la Paix
