= Massimiliano Maisto =

Italian cyclist

Personal information
- Born: 27 August 1980 (age 46) Milan, Italy

Cycling career
- Sport: Cycling
- Current team: Retired
- Discipline: Road
- Role: Rider

Professional teams
- 2006: CB Immobiliare–Universal Caffé
- 2007–2008: OTC Doors–Lauretana

Massimiliano Maisto (born 27 August 1980 in Milan) is an Italian former professional road cyclist.

== Major results ==
2003
1st Stage 9 Giro Ciclistico d'Italia
1st Stage 2 Giro del Friuli Venezia Giulia
2005
3rd Giro della Valsesia 1
5th Coppa della Pace
7th Giro delle Valli Aretine
2006
6th Trofeo Melinda
8th Coppa Ugo Agostoni
2007
7th Coppa Ugo Agostoni
10th Memorial Marco Pantani
10th Giro d'Oro
2008
1st Tour du Jura
8th Coppa Ugo Agostoni
9th Giro del Mendrisiotto
10th Tour du Doubs
