= Tracta (dough) =

Pastry dough in Ancient Roman and Greek cuisines

Tracta, tractum (Ancient Greek: τρακτὸς, τρακτόν), also called laganon, laganum, or lagana (Ancient Greek: λάγανον), is a kind of drawn-out or rolled-out pastry dough in Roman and Greek cuisines.

What exactly it was is unclear: "Latin tracta... appears to be a kind of pastry. It is hard to be sure, because its making is never described fully"; and it may have meant different things at different periods. Laganon/laganum was at different periods an unleavened bread, a pancake, or later, perhaps a sort of pasta.

Tracta is mentioned in the Apicius as a thickener for liquids. Vehling's translation of Apicius glosses it as "a piece of pastry, a round bread or roll in this case, stale, best suited for this purpose". Perry compares it to a "ship's biscuit".

It is also mentioned in Cato the Elder's recipe for placenta cake, layered with cheese.

Athenaeus's Deipnosophistae mentions a kind of cake called καπυρίδια, "known as τράκτα", which uses a bread dough, but is baked differently.

Some writers connect it to modern Italian lasagna, of which it is sometimes claimed to be the etymon (linguistic origin), but most authors deny that it was pasta. The etymological origin of lasagna is also generally said to be other than lagana.

There is a modern Greek leavened flatbread called lagana, but it is not clear when the name was first applied to a leavened bread.
