= Pasquale Muto =

Italian cyclist

Personal information
- Born: 24 May 1980 (age 46) Naples, Italy

Cycling career
- Sport: Cycling
- Current team: Retired
- Discipline: Road
- Role: Rider

Professional team
- 2004–2011: Miche

Pasquale Muto (born 24 May 1980 in Naples) is an Italian former cyclist.

== Major results ==
2002
4th Trofeo Piva
2003
1st Ruota d'Oro
2004
7th GP Città di Camaiore
2005
4th GP du canton d'Argovie
9th Overall Route du Sud
2006
2nd Trofeo Matteotti
2007
1st Stage 8 Tour of Bulgaria
3rd Memorial Marco Pantani
4th Giro del Mendrisiotto
7th Overall Route du Sud
9th Trofeo Laigueglia
10th Overall Tour de Slovénie
2008
3rd Trofeo Matteotti
6th Giro del Veneto
6th Giro del Mendrisiotto
8th GP Città di Camaiore
9th Coppa Placci
9th Overall Route du Sud
2009
3rd Overall Tour of Slovakia

1st Stage 1

3rd Giro dell'Appennino
5th Overall Brixia Tour
7th Overall Tour du Gévaudan Languedoc-Roussillon
7th Coppa Agostoni
7th GP Nobili Rubinetterie
8th Giro di Toscana
8th Giro del Friuli
9th Overall Giro di Sardegna
9th Trofeo Laigueglia
2010
2nd Overall Course de la Solidarité Olympique
4th Overall Route du Sud
5th Subida al Naranco
7th Trofeo Matteotti
7th Giro dell'Appennino
9th Memorial Marco Pantani
2011
5th Giro dell'Appennino
