= Giro di Padania =

Race details
- Date: Early September
- Region: Po Valley, Northern Italy, Italy
- English name: Tour of the Po Valley
- Local name(s): Giro di Padania, Monviso-Venezia — Il Padania
- Discipline: Road race
- Competition: UCI Europe Tour
- Type: Stage race
- Organiser: ASD Monviso-Venezia

History
- First edition: 2011
- Editions: 2
- Final edition: 2012
- First winner: Ivan Basso (ITA)
- Final winner: Vincenzo Nibali (ITA)

The Giro di Padania was a multi-stage cycling race which forms part of the UCI Europe Tour. It was held at the beginning of September in Northern Italy, in the region known as the Po Valley or Padania.

The first edition, won by Ivan Basso, was held from 6 September until 10 September 2011. About 200 riders participated to the first Giro di Padania, with the national teams of Australia, Poland and Slovenia. This edition was heavily disrupted by activists protesting against the Lega Nord and the Berlusconi government austerity plans. Activists also claimed that the race was intended as political Propaganda for the Lega Nord political party. In the 2011 edition the leader's jersey was green (which is also the colour of Lega Nord), but the colour was changed to blue in 2012.

The race was cancelled in 2013 and has not been held since.

== Winners ==
Year	Country	Rider	Team
2011	Italy	Ivan Basso	Liquigas–Cannondale
2012	Italy	Vincenzo Nibali	Liquigas–Cannondale
