= Krzysztof Szczawiński =

Polish cyclist

Personal information
- Born: 29 May 1979 (age 47) Nowe Miasto, Płońsk County, Poland

Cycling career
- Sport: Cycling
- Current team: Retired
- Discipline: Road
- Role: Rider

Professional teams
- 2004: Team ICET
- 2005–2006: Ceramica Flaminia
- 2007–2011: Miche

Krzysztof Szczawiński (born 29 May 1979) is a Polish former professional road cyclist.

== Major results ==
2004
1st Giro Colline del Chianti
2nd GP San Giuliano
6th Tour du Finistère
6th Tour du Lac Leman
10th Criterium d'Abruzzo
2005
3rd Giro del Lazio
4th Memorial Cimurri
5th GP Industria & Commercio di Prato
5th Coppa Sabatini
6th Giro di Toscana
7th GP Costa degli Etruschi
8th Gran Premio Bruno Beghelli
2006
5th GP Industria & Commercio di Prato
5th Giro di Toscana
5th GP Costa degli Etruschi
6th Coppa Bernocchi
2007
1st Stage 3b Tour of Bulgaria
4th Road race, National Road Championships
7th Giro del Mendrisiotto
7th GP Costa Degli Etruschi
2008
10th Gran Premio Bruno Beghelli
10th GP Kranj
2009
7th Gran Premio Bruno Beghelli
10th GP Kranj
10th GP Costa Degli Etruschi
