= Lagana (bread) =

Type of Greek flat bread

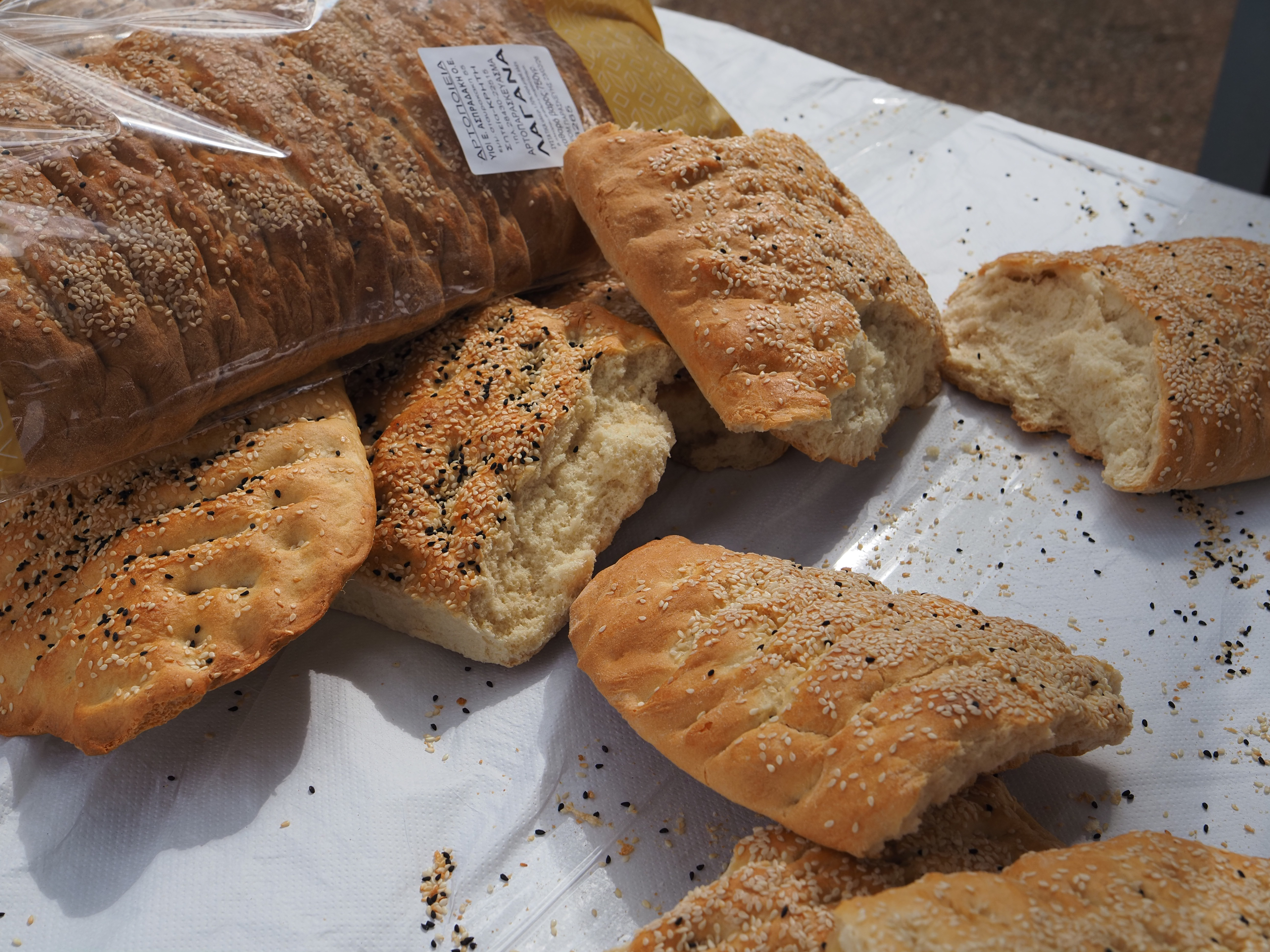
- Leavened lagana with sesame seeds
- Alternative names: λαγάνα
- Type: Bread
- Place of origin: Greece
- Ingredients generally used: Sesame seeds
- Similar dishes: Focaccia

Lagana (Greek: λαγάνα, from λάγανον) is a Greek flatbread traditionally baked for Clean Monday, the first day of the Great Lent. Traditionally, it was prepared unleavened (without yeast), but leavened lagana is nowadays more common. It is typically flat, oval-shaped, with its surface decorated by impressing fingertips.

Sesame seeds are a common topping, and it may also be topped with other herbs, and seasoned with olive oil. The name comes from a Greco-Roman pastry dough lagana, which is also the origin of the word lasagna, also known as tracta, from Ancient Greek: τρακτὸς.

== See also ==
- Focaccia, a similar bread from Italian cuisine
