= NGC Medical–OTC Industria Porte =

NGC Medical-OTC Industria Porte
Team information
- UCI code: NGC
- Registered: Italy 2006–2007; Switzerland 2008
- Founded: 2006
- Disbanded: 2008
- Discipline: Road
- Status: Cont: 2006; ProCont: 2007–2008

Key personnel
- General manager: Pier Giovanni Baldini

Team name history
- 2006–2007 2008: OTC Doors-Lauretana; NGC Medical-OTC Industria Porte

NGC Medical–OTC Industria Porte (UCI team code: NGC) was a professional continental road bicycle racing team based in Italy that competed predominantly in UCI Europe Tour and other UCI Continental Circuits races and, when invited, in UCI ProTour events.

The team was formed in 2006 as a UCI Continental team, managed by Pier Giovanni Baldini. For the 2006 season, Daniele Masiani and Alessio Di Basco assisted as directeur sportifs. In 2007, Giuseppe Lanzoni and Gianluigi Barsottelli took over as directeur sportifs.

After the 2008 season, NGC became the cosponsor of UCI ProTour team Lampre. When no new cosponsor could be found, the team disbanded.

== Major wins ==
2007
Ukraine Road Race Championships, Volodymyr Zagorodny
Stage 5 Tour of Slovenia, Enrico Rossi
2008
Stage 1 Giro del Trentino, Volodymyr Zagorodny
Memorial Marco Pantani, Enrico Rossi
Tour du Jura, Massimiliano Maisto

== Final roster ==
Rider	Date of birth
Silvère Ackermann (SUI)	December 30, 1984 (age 41)
Laurent Beuret (SUI)	June 24, 1986 (age 40)
Piergiorgio Camussa (ITA)	September 25, 1981 (age 44)
Donato Cannone (ITA)	February 16, 1982 (age 44)
Marco Cattaneo (ITA)	June 5, 1982 (age 44)
Marco Corsini (ITA)	February 4, 1981 (age 45)
Massimiliano Maisto (ITA)	August 27, 1980 (age 46)
Diego Nosotti (ITA)	July 26, 1982 (age 44)

Rider	Date of birth
Fabrice Piemontesi (ITA)	August 16, 1983 (age 43)
Francesco Reda (ITA)	November 19, 1982 (age 43)
Bruno Rizzi (ITA)	November 3, 1983 (age 42)
Enrico Rossi (ITA)	May 5, 1982 (age 44)
Alessio Signego (ITA)	December 11, 1983 (age 42)
Francesco Tizza (ITA)	February 24, 1981 (age 45)
Stefan Trafelet (SUI)	March 23, 1984 (age 42)
Volodymyr Zagorodny (UKR)	June 27, 1981 (age 45)
