= Tour du Jura (Switzerland) =

Swiss one-day road cycling race

Race details
- Date: July (until 2014); September (2017)
- Region: Jura
- Discipline: Road race
- Competition: UCI Europe Tour (2005–2017); National calendar (2020–)
- Type: Single day race
- Web site: www.tourdujura.ch

History
- First edition: 1981
- Editions: 38 (as of 2024)
- First winner: Daniel Wyder (SUI)
- Most wins: Michel Klinger (SUI); Roger Beuchat (SUI) (2 wins)
- Most recent: Arnaud Tendon (SUI)

The Tour du Jura is a one-day cycling race held annually in Switzerland. From 2005 to 2017, the race was held as a category 1.2 event on the UCI Europe Tour, before dropping down to the national level.

== Winners ==
Year	Country	Rider	Team
1981	Switzerland	Daniel Wyder	
1982	Switzerland	Jochen Baumann	
1983	Netherlands	Marc van Orsouw	
1984	Switzerland	Pius Schwarzentruber	
1985	Switzerland	Daniel Steiger	
1986	Switzerland	Beat Meister	
1987	Switzerland	Daniel Hirs	
1988	Switzerland	Peter Bodenmann	
1989	West Germany	Gerd Schierle	
1990	Switzerland	Markus Oppliger	
1991	Switzerland	Kurt Lustenberger	
1992	Switzerland	Stephan Zbinden	
1993	Switzerland	Frédéric Vifian	
1994	Switzerland	Markus Kammermann	
1995	Switzerland	Cédric Milliéry	
1996	Switzerland	Markus Blessing	
1997	No race		
1998	Switzerland	Michel Klinger	
1999	Switzerland	Michel Klinger	
2000	Switzerland	David Rusch	
2001	Switzerland	Roger Beuchat	Phonak
2002	France	Jérôme Gannat	
2003	Switzerland	Florian Lüdi	
2004	France	Yannick Talabardon	Auber 93
2005	New Zealand	Glen Chadwick	Cyclingnews.com
2006	Germany	Andreas Schillinger	Milram Continental Team
2007	France	Guillaume Levarlet	Auber 93
2008	Italy	Massimiliano Maisto	NGC Medical–OTC Industria Porte
2009	Switzerland	Roger Beuchat	Team Neotel
2010– 2012	No race		
2013	Switzerland	Matthias Brändle	IAM Cycling
2014	France	Kévin Ledanois	France (national team)
2015– 2016	No race		
2017	Switzerland	Marc Hirschi	Switzerland (national team)
2018– 2019	No race		
2020	Ireland	Matthew Teggart	AC Bisontine
2021	France	Alan Jousseaume	Vendée U
2022	France	Antoine Devanne	Vendée U
2023	Switzerland	Elia Blum	Tudor Pro Cycling Team U23
2024	Switzerland	Arnaud Tendon	Tudor Pro Cycling Team U23
