= Riccardo Chiarini =

Italian cyclist and mountain biker

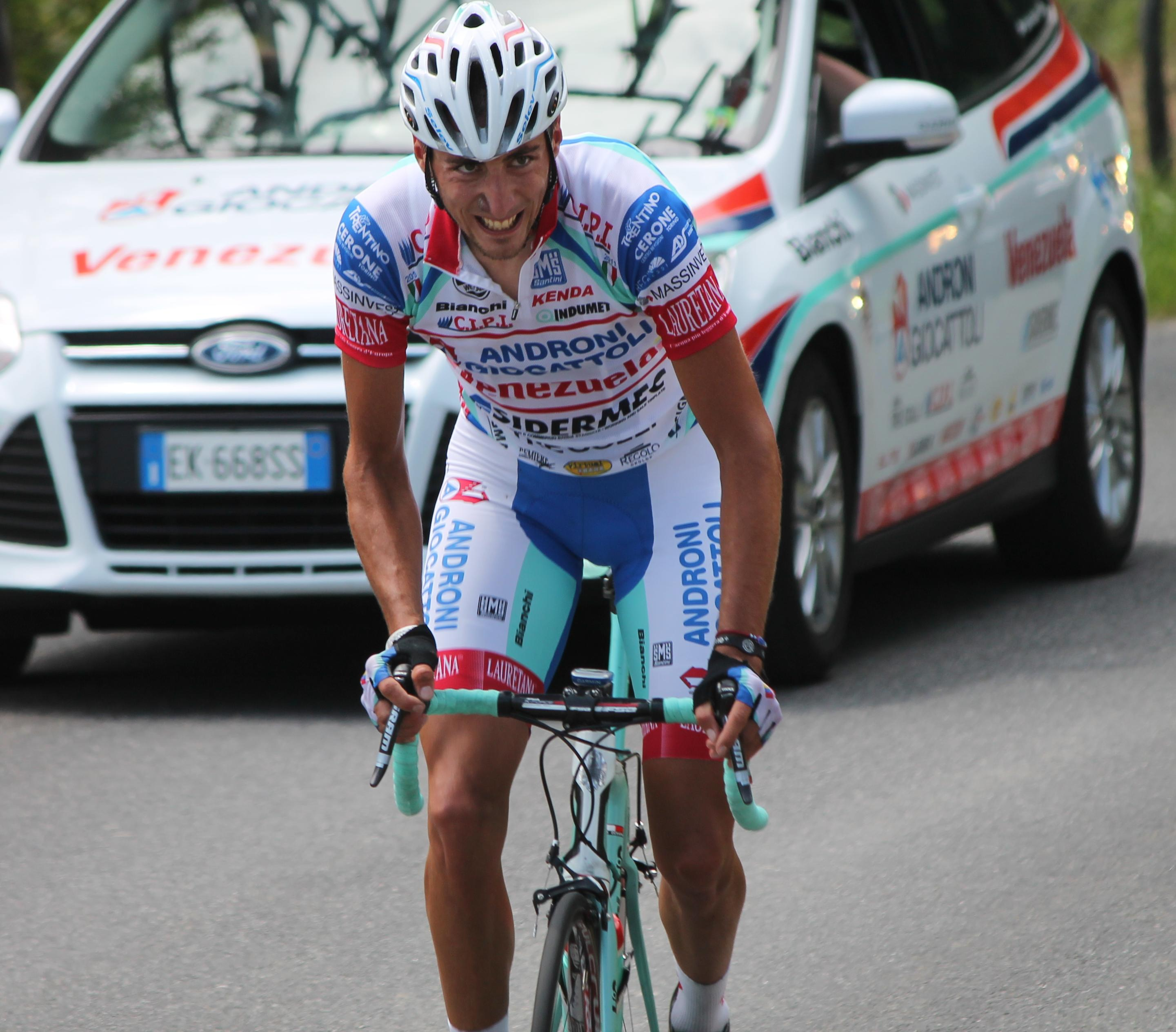

Personal information
- Full name: Riccardo Chiarini
- Born: 20 February 1984 (age 42) Faenza, Italy

Cycling career
- Sport: Cycling
- Discipline: Road
- Role: Rider

Professional teams
- 2006: Selle Italia–Diquigiovanni
- 2007–2009: Team LPR
- 2010: De Rosa–Stac Plastic
- 2011–2013: Androni Giocattoli

Riccardo Chiarini (born 20 February 1984) is an Italian mountainbiker and former professional road bicycle racer, who last rode for UCI Professional Continental team Androni Giocattoli–Venezuela. He is a native of Faenza.

== Doping ==
Chiarini tested positive for EPO in an out of competition test 7 May 2014, and received a two-year doping ban.

== Palmarès ==
2007
7th Coppa Placci
10th Tre Valli Varesine
2010
1st Trofeo Matteotti
4th Gran Premio Nobili Rubinetterie – Coppa Papà Carlo
4th Gran Premio Città di Camaiore
6th Overall Settimana internazionale di Coppi e Bartali
6th Overall Settimana Ciclistica Lombarda
7th Classica Sarda
10th Overall Brixia Tour
2011
7th Giro dell'Emilia
8th Memorial Marco Pantani
9th Overall Tour of Turkey
10th Overall Settimana Ciclistica Lombarda
10th Overall Giro di Padania
10th Giro di Lombardia
2012
2nd Overall Giro di Padania
5th Coppa Ugo Agostoni
7th Grand Prix of Aargau Canton
7th Gran Premio Nobili Rubinetterie
8th Overall Route du Sud

=== Grand Tour General Classification results timeline ===
Grand Tour	2008	2009	2010	2011	2012	2013
Giro d'Italia	125	118	—	—	—	—
Tour de France	—	—	—	—	—	—
Vuelta a España	—	—	—	—	—	—

Legend
—	Did not compete
DNF	Did not finish
