= Ceramica Flaminia =

Cyclism team in holand

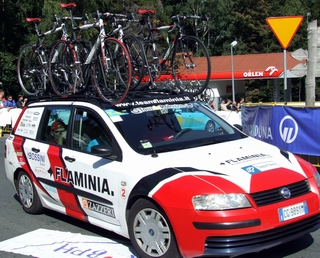
- Ceramica Flaminia team car

Team information
- UCI code: FLM
- Registered: Italy 2004–2007; Ireland 2008–2010
- Founded: 2004
- Disbanded: 2010
- Discipline: Road
- Status: 2004: Div. III; 2005: Cont; 2006–2010 : ProCont

Key personnel
- Team managers: Roberto Marrone; Massimo Podenzana; Orlando Maini; Giuseppe Petito; Omar Piscina

Team name history
- 2004 2005–2007 2008–2009 2010: Team Icet; Ceramica Flaminia; Ceramica Flaminia-Bossini Docce; Ceramica Flaminia

Ceramica Flaminia (UCI team code: FLM) was a professional continental cycling team based in Italy that participated in UCI Continental Circuits races and when selected as a wildcard to UCI ProTour events. The team was managed by Massimo Podenzana, with assistance from directeur sportif Simone Borgheresi.

It was sponsored by Ceramica Flaminia, an Italian tile manufacturer. The company returned to cycling sponsorship in 2013 with a new development team, Ceramica Flaminia–Fondriest.

== Major wins ==
2004
Trofeo Giacomo Matteotti, Stefano Boggia
Tour du Finistère, Daniele Balestri
Giro Colline del Chianti, Krzysztof Szczawiński
2005
Stage 5 Course de la Solidarité Olympique, Maurizio Varini
Giro del Medio Brenta, Manuele Spadi
2006
Memorial Oleg Dyachenko, Aleksandr Kuschynski
Gran Premio Nobili Rubinetterie, Paolo Longo Borghini
2007
Poland National Road Championships Road race, Tomasz Marczyński
Giro del Medio Brenta, Adriano Angeloni
2008
Overall Volta ao Distrito de Santarem, Maurizio Biondo

Stage 3, Maurizio Biondo

GP de la Ville de Rennes, Mikhaylo Khalilov
Stage 4 Circuit de la Sarthe, Mikhaylo Khalilov
Stage 4 Vuelta a Asturias, Tomasz Marczyński
Italy National Road Championships Road race, Filippo Simeoni
Gran Premio Industria e Commercio di Prato, Mikhaylo Khalilov
Memorial Cimurri, Mikhaylo Khalilov
Coppa Sabatini, Mikhaylo Khalilov
2009
Stage 1 Circuit de la Sarthe, Enrico Rossi
Ronde van Drenthe, Maurizio Biondo
Overall Brixia Tour, Giampaolo Caruso

Stages 2, 3 & 5, Giampaolo Caruso

2010
Stages 3 & 5 Settimana Lombarda, Riccardo Riccò
Dwars door Drenthe, Enrico Rossi
Stage 2 Giro del Trentino, Riccardo Riccò
Latvia National Road Championships Time trial, Raivis Belohvoščiks
Overall Tour of Austria, Riccardo Riccò

Stage 2 & 4, Riccardo Riccò

== Team roster ==
As of 1 January 2010

Rider	Date of birth
Santo Anzà (ITA)	November 17, 1980 (aged 29)
Filippo Baggio (ITA)	June 5, 1988 (aged 21)
Paolo Bailetti (ITA)	July 15, 1980 (aged 29)
Raivis Belohvoščiks (LAT)	January 21, 1976 (aged 33)
Donato Cannone (ITA)	February 16, 1982 (aged 27)
Giampaolo Caruso (ITA)	August 15, 1980 (aged 29)
Luca Celli (ITA)	February 23, 1979 (aged 30)
Daniele Colli (ITA)	April 19, 1982 (aged 27)
Cristiano Fumagalli (ITA)	July 28, 1984 (aged 25)

Rider	Date of birth
Massimiliano Gentili (ITA)	September 16, 1971 (aged 38)
Leonardo Giordani (ITA)	May 27, 1977 (aged 32)
Edoardo Girardi (ITA)	October 22, 1985 (aged 24)
Fabrizio Lucciola (ITA)	January 13, 1986 (aged 23)
Alessandro Maserati (ITA)	September 8, 1979 (aged 30)
Andrea Noè (ITA)	January 15, 1969 (aged 40)
Riccardo Riccò (ITA)	September 1, 1983 (aged 26)
Enrico Rossi (ITA)	May 5, 1982 (aged 27)

== National champions ==
2007
Polish Road race champion, Tomasz Marczyński
2008
Italian Road race champion, Filippo Simeoni
2010
Latvian time trial champion, Raivis Belohvoščiks
