= Enrico Rossi (cyclist) =

Italian cyclist

Personal information
- Full name: Enrico Rossi
- Born: 5 May 1982 (age 44) Cesena, Italy

Cycling career
- Sport: Cycling
- Current team: Retired
- Discipline: Road
- Role: Rider

Professional teams
- 2007–2008: OTC Doors–Lauretana
- 2009–2010: Ceramica Flaminia–Bossini Docce
- 2012–2013: Meridiana–Kamen
- 2014: Christina Watches–Dana

Enrico Rossi (born 5 May 1982) is an Italian former professional road racing cyclist who retired in 2014.

== Career ==
Rossi was born in Cesena. His younger sister is the cyclocross rider Vania Rossi. Rossi was sacked by his Ceramica Flaminia team in 2010 after being implicated in a drug-dealing ring also involving his sister. In 2014, Rossi courted further controversy when he was involved in a fight with Spanish cyclist Vicente García de Mateos at the 2014 Volta a Portugal.

== Major results ==
2007
1st Stage 5 Tour of Slovenia
6th Coppa Bernocchi

2008
1st Memorial Marco Pantani
1st Points classification Tour of Slovenia
2nd Giro del Mendrisiotto

2009
1st Stage 1 Circuit de la Sarthe
2nd Giro della Romagna
2nd Gran Premio dell'Insubria-Lugano
3rd Gran Premio Bruno Beghelli
3rd Trofeo Laigueglia
4th Giro di Toscana
8th Milan–San Remo

2010
1st Dwars door Drenthe
3rd Châteauroux Classic
3rd Grand Prix de Denain
3rd Giro del Friuli
3rd Rund um Köln
4th Trofeo Laigueglia
5th Memorial Rik Van Steenbergen
6th Paris–Brussels
6th Scheldeprijs
6th Gran Premio della Costa Etruschi
9th Coppa Bernocchi

2012
1st Overall Okolo Slovenska

1st Stages 1 & 4

1st Stage 1 Giro di Padania
1st Stage 2 Tour de Serbie
10th Gran Premio della Costa Etruschi

2013
2nd Memorial Marco Pantani
4th Poreč Trophy
7th Coppa Bernocchi
9th Grand Prix Šenčur

2014
4th Rund um Köln
