= Miche–Guerciotti =

Miche-Guerciotti

Team information
- UCI code: MIE
- Registered: Bulgaria: 2003, 2005; Italy: 2004, 2006, 2010–2012; Poland: 2007; San Marino: 2008–2009
- Founded: 2003
- Disbanded: 2012
- Discipline: Road
- Status: Div. III: 2003; Div. II: 2004; ProCont: 2005–2006; Cont: 2007–2012

Key personnel
- General manager: Mauro Tognaccini

Team name history
- 2003–2007 2008 2009 2010 2011–2012: Miche; Miche-Silver Cross; Miche-Silver Cross-Selle Italia; Miche; Miche-Guerciotti

Miche–Guerciotti was a UCI Continental cycling team active from 2003 to 2012. The team wais managed by Mauro Tognaccini with assistance from directeur sportifs Marco Tozzi, Giuseppe Tognaccini and Todor Kolev. The team held UCI Professional Continental status from 2005 to 2006.

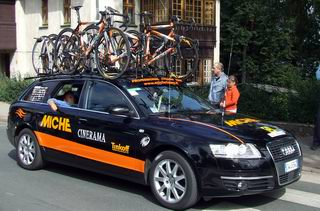
A team car

== Major wins ==
2003
Stage 1 & 5b Tour of Bulgaria, Fabio Borghesi
Stage 2 Tour of Bulgaria, Balasz Rohtmer
2004
Gran Premio Industria e Commercio Artigianato Carnaghese, Christian Murro
Russia, Time Trial Championship, Alexander Bespalov
GP Città di Rio Saliceto e Correggio, Przemysław Niemiec
2005
Stage 1 Giro del Trentino, Przemysław Niemiec
Overall Tour of Slovenia, Przemysław Niemiec

Stage 3, Przemysław Niemiec

2006
Giro di Toscana, Przemysław Niemiec
Stage 3 Route du Sud, Przemysław Niemiec
2007
Giro della Romagna, Eddy Serri
Stage 3b Tour of Bulgaria, Krzysztof Szczawinski
Stage 8 Tour of Bulgaria, Pasquale Muto
2008
Giro del Mendrisiotto, Eddy Serri
Stage 3 Route du Sud, Przemysław Niemiec
2009
Stage 2 Giro del Trentino, Przemysław Niemiec
Overall Route du Sud, Przemysław Niemiec

Stage 2, Przemysław Niemiec

Stage 1 Tour de Slovaquie, Pasquale Muto
2010
Stage 3 Settimana Internazionale di Coppi e Bartali, Przemysław Niemiec
Stage 2 Tour des Pyrénées, Przemysław Niemiec
2011
Stage 4 Tour du Maroc, Roberto Cesaro
Stage 10 Tour du Maroc, Leonardo Pinizzotto
Stages 1 & 2b Vuelta a Asturias, Stefan Schumacher
Stage 5 Vuelta a Asturias, Constantino Zaballa
Stages 1 & 6 Azerbaijan Tour, Stefan Schumacher
Tre Valli Varesine, Davide Rebellin
Trofeo Melinda, Davide Rebellin

== Team roster ==
As of 28 January 2012.

Rider	Date of birth
Nicola Dal Santo (ITA)	14 November 1988 (age 37)
Giuseppe Di Salvo (ITA)	4 April 1984 (age 42)
Enrico Franzoi (ITA)	8 August 1982 (age 44)
Cristiano Fumagalli (ITA)	28 July 1984 (age 42)

Rider	Date of birth
Alessandro Malaguti (ITA)	22 September 1987 (age 38)
Enrico Peruffo (ITA)	8 July 1985 (age 41)
Gianluca Randazzo (ITA)	4 November 1985 (age 40)
Leopoldo Rocchetti (ITA)	19 January 1986 (age 40)
