= LPR (cycling team) =

LPR Brakes
Team information
- UCI code: LPR
- Registered: Switzerland 2004-2007; Ireland 2008-2009
- Founded: 2004
- Disbanded: 2009
- Discipline: Road
- Status: Professional Continental

Key personnel
- General manager: Davide Boifava

Team name history
- 2004–2006 2004–2007 2008 2009: LPR-Piacenza; Team LPR; LPR Brakes-Ballan; LPR Brakes-Farnese Vini

LPR Brakes (UCI team code: LPR) was a UCI Professional Continental cycling team, registered in Ireland. The team participated in UCI Continental Circuits races and, when selected as a wildcard, UCI ProTour events. The 2007 squad merged with Team 3C Casalinghi Jet Androni Giocattoli. The team was managed by Davide Boifava in the 2007 season but Fabio Bordonali acquired the management in late 2007. Giovanni Fidanza, Mario Manzoni, and Marco Giuseppe Tabai were directeur sportifs. The team folded after the 2009 season.

== Major wins ==
2004
Tour du Lac Léman, Dmitri Konyshev
2005
GP Knorr, Mauro Santambrogio
Giro del Mendrisiotto, Michele Maccanti
Stausee Rundfahrt, Danilo Napolitano
Stage 3 Settimana Internazionale di Coppi e Bartali, Danilo Napolitano
Stage 5 Settimana Internazionale di Coppi e Bartali, Elio Aggiano
Route Adélie de Vitré, Daniele Contrini
Stage 2 Giro del Trentino, Giuseppe Muraglia
Overall Clasica Alcobendas, Pavel Tonkov

Stage 1, Pavel Tonkov

Stage 3 Tour de Picardie, Daniele Contrini
Stage 1 Vuelta a Asturias, Dmitri Konyshev
Stage 3 Vuelta a Asturias, Mikhaylo Khalilov
Ukraine Road Race Championships, Mikhaylo Khalilov
Stage 3 Brixia Tour, Danilo Napolitano
Coppa Bernocchi, Danilo Napolitano
Stages 2 & 5 Tour du Poitou-Charentes, Danilo Napolitano
Giro della Romagna, Danilo Napolitano
2006
Stage 7 Tour de Langkawi, Elio Aggiano
GP Knorr, Giairo Ermeti
Giro del Mendrisiotto, Daniele De Paoli
Hel van het Mergelland, Mikhaylo Khalilov
Stage 2 Tour de Suisse, Daniele Contrini
2007
Giro del Mendrisiotto, Andreas Dietziker
Grand Prix Pino Cerami, Luca Solari
Stage 3 Rheinland-Pfalz Rundfahrt, Luca Celli
Stage 5 Rheinland-Pfalz Rundfahrt, Andreas Dietziker
GP Kranj, Borut Božič
Overall Tour de Wallonie, Borut Božič
Stage 3 Tour of Ireland, Borut Božič
Stage 5 Tour of Ireland, Marco Marcato
2008
Overall Giro della Provincia di Reggio Calabria, Daniele Pietropolli

Stage 3, Daniele Pietropolli

Stage 2 Tour Ivoirien de la Paix, Sergio Laganà
Stage 3 Tour Ivoirien de la Paix, Walter Proch
Overall Settimana Lombarda, Danilo Di Luca

Stage 4, Danilo Di Luca

Giro d'Oro, Gabriele Bosisio
Stage 7 Giro d'Italia, Gabriele Bosisio
Overall Tour of Slovenia, Jure Golčer

Stage 1, Claudio Cucinotta
Stage 3, Jure Golčer

Ukraine Road Race Championships, Ruslan Pidgornyy
Stage 3 Tour of Austria, Ruslan Pidgornyy
Stage 3 Brixia Tour, Gabriele Bosisio
Stages 1, 6 & 8 Tour of Britain, Alessandro Petacchi
Memorial Viviana Manservisi, Alessandro Petacchi
Giro dell'Emilia, Danilo Di Luca
Gran Premio Bruno Beghelli, Alessandro Petacchi
2009
Gran Premio della Costa Etruschi, Alessandro Petacchi
Overall Giro della Provincia di Grosseto, Daniele Pietropolli

Stage 3, Daniele Pietropolli

Stage 5 Giro di Sardegna, Alessandro Petacchi
Stage 2 Tirreno–Adriatico, Alessandro Petacchi
Overall Settimana Lombarda, Daniele Pietropolli

Stage 1, Team Time Trial
Stages 2 & 4, Alessandro Petacchi

Scheldeprijs, Alessandro Petacchi
Stage 4 Giro del Trentino, Danilo Di Luca
Giro di Toscana, Alessandro Petacchi
Stages 2 & 3 Giro d'Italia, Alessandro Petacchi
Memorial Marco Pantani, Roberto Ferrari
Stage 1 Delta Tour Zeeland, Alessandro Petacchi

== 2009 Team ==
As of 31 December 2009.

Rider	Date of birth
Lorenzo Bernucci (ITA)	15 September 1979 (aged 30)
Gabriele Bosisio (ITA)	6 August 1980 (aged 29)
Marco Cattaneo (ITA)	5 June 1982 (aged 27)
Riccardo Chiarini (ITA)	20 February 1984 (aged 25)
Claudio Cucinotta (ITA)	22 January 1982 (aged 27)
Danilo Di Luca (ITA)	2 January 1976 (aged 33)
Giairo Ermeti (ITA)	7 April 1981 (aged 28)
Roberto Ferrari (ITA)	9 March 1983 (aged 26)
Jure Golčer (SLO)	7 December 1977 (aged 32)

Rider	Date of birth
Sergio Lagana (ITA)	4 November 1982 (aged 27)
Sergio Marinangeli (ITA)	2 July 1980 (aged 29)
Matteo Montaguti (ITA)	6 January 1984 (aged 25)
Fabio Negri (ITA)	6 December 1982 (aged 27)
Alberto Ongarato (ITA)	24 July 1975 (aged 34)
Alessandro Petacchi (ITA)	3 January 1974 (aged 35)
Daniele Pietropolli (ITA)	11 July 1980 (aged 29)
Cristiano Salerno (ITA)	18 February 1985 (aged 24)
Alessandro Spezialetti (ITA)	14 January 1975 (aged 34)
