= 2008 Giro d'Italia, Stage 1 to Stage 11 =

Cycling race stages

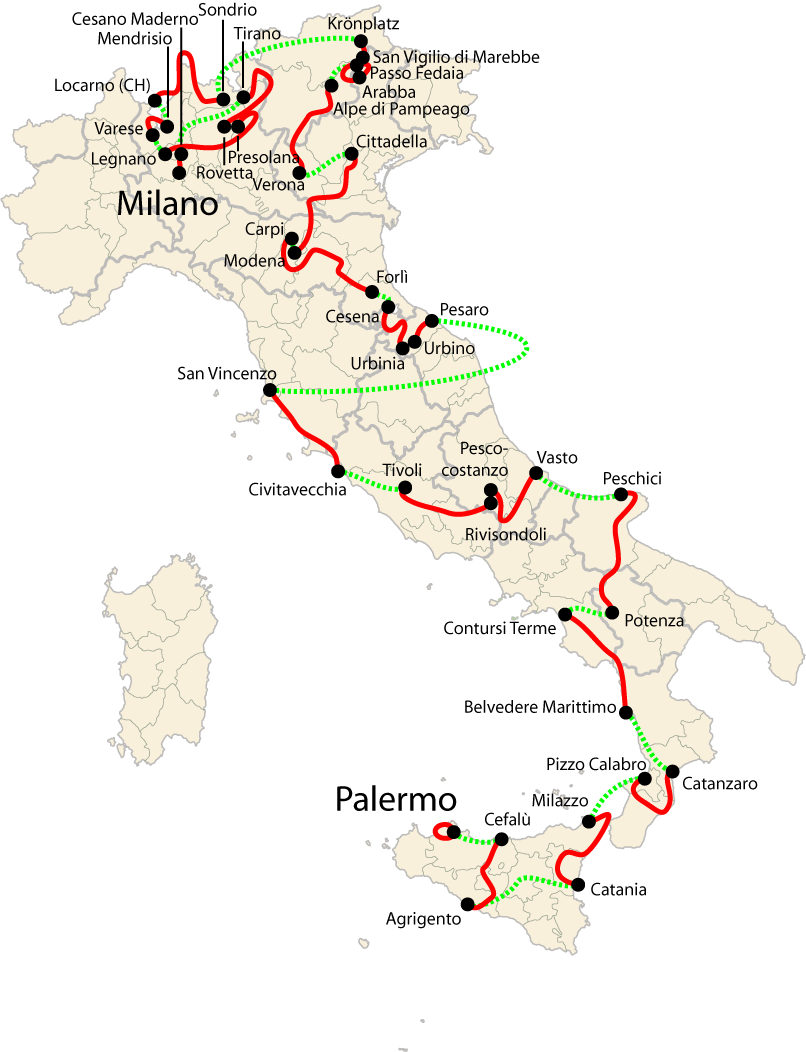
Overview of the stages; red lines represent distances covered in the individual stages, while green lines are the distances between the stages, covered by bus, car, and plane.

The 2008 Giro d'Italia began on 10 May, with Stage 11 occurring on 21 May. The first stage, like it had been in 2007, was a team time trial, a stage where each member of the team raced together against the clock. This stage was won by the American team Slipstream–Chipotle, who had viewed it as their primary goal in the Giro. It allowed their leader Christian Vande Velde to wear the first pink jersey as race leader. Unlike in most cycling Grand Tours, the first road race stage 2008 Giro was not a flat stage decided by sprinters, but rather one over a hilly course that would be won by a breakaway or a strong climber. Though Stages 3 and 4 were both flat and conquered by sprinters, this meant that it was unlikely that a sprinter would get to wear the pink jersey at any point in the race.

The first half of the 2008 Giro contained six stages classified as medium-mountain, though many of them contained difficult, selective climbs that broke up the racing peloton. The sixth stage was shortened from its planned length of 265 km (165 mi). This was due to riders speaking with race officials and asking that the 34 km (21 mi) finishing circuit be eliminated, as the long transfers between stage finish towns and start towns the next day had afforded them little rest to prepare for such a long stage. In that same stage, a 12-rider breakaway finished sufficiently ahead of the peloton that one of its members, Giovanni Visconti, became the new overall race leader, a lead that he would maintain for more than a week.

- s.t. indicates that the rider crossed the finish line in the same group as the one receiving the time above him, and was therefore credited with the same finishing time.

== Stage 1 ==
10 May 2008 — Palermo, 23.6 km (14.7 mi) (team time trial)

The Giro began, like it had the previous year, with a team time trial (TTT) on one of Italy's islands, this year in Sicily. The course was flat. There was speculation that this stage would result in a second American cyclist to wear the pink jersey (the first having been Andrew Hampsten in 1988), as Astana, Team CSC, and Slipstream–Chipotle were all considered favorites to win the stage and all had strong American time trialists on their squads. Slipstream–Chipotle, one of the first Professional Continental teams announced for the race, held a special training camp in Spain a week before the race specifically to work on their TTT skills.

The early time to beat was set by the second team to take the course, Tinkoff Credit Systems, clocking in at 27' 05". After three other teams came Slipstream–Chipotle, who finished with only the minimum of five riders together (the team's time is taken for the fifth rider to cross the finish line, with any riders who are dropped given their own times) after David Millar was dropped in the final kilometer. Christian Vande Velde was the first to cross the line for Slipstream–Chipotle, after 26' 32". That Vande Velde had been the first over the line rather than time trial specialist David Zabriskie had not been specifically the plan. The next team on course was Astana, who were nine seconds slower than Slipstream–Chipotle at the first time check and finished in 27' 01". Team CSC and Barloworld were both ahead of Slipstream–Chipotle at the first intermediate time check, but faded toward the finish and clocked in second and fifth, respectively. Slipstream–Chipotle's time held up to the end of the stage, affording Vande Velde the first pink jersey.

Stage 1 result

	Team	Time
1	Slipstream–Chipotle	26' 32"
2	Team CSC	+ 6"
3	Team High Road	+ 7"
4	Liquigas	+ 9"
5	Barloworld	+ 14"
6	LPR Brakes–Ballan	+ 28"
7	Astana	+ 29"
8	Tinkoff Credit Systems	+ 33"
9	Quick-Step	+ 42"
10	Lampre	+ 45"

General classification after stage 1

	Rider	Team	Time
1	Christian Vande Velde (USA)	Slipstream–Chipotle	26' 32"
2	David Zabriskie (USA)	Slipstream–Chipotle	+ 0"
3	Ryder Hesjedal (CAN)	Slipstream–Chipotle	+ 0"
4	Julian Dean (NZL)	Slipstream–Chipotle	+ 0"
5	Magnus Bäckstedt (SWE)	Slipstream–Chipotle	+ 0"
6	Michael Blaudzun (DEN)	Team CSC	+ 6"
7	Nicki Sørensen (DEN)	Team CSC	+ 6"
8	Bradley McGee (AUS)	Team CSC	+ 6"
9	Stuart O'Grady (AUS)	Team CSC	+ 6"
10	Jason McCartney (USA)	Team CSC	+ 6"

== Stage 2 ==
11 May 2008 — Cefalù to Agrigento, 207 km (129 mi)

This was a hilly course, in contrast to most Grand Tours, which begin with flat road stages. It contained two categorized climbs, and favored an attacking rider.

The significant breakaway of the day comprised David Loosli and Jérémy Roy, after Dionisio Galparsoro had been brought back into the peloton after an earlier attack. Loosli and Roy attained a maximum advantage of over ten minutes. With 65 km (40 mi) remaining in the stage for the peloton, a significant crash occurred as they went over a railroad crossing. David Zabriskie was the most seriously hurt, needing to be taken away from the race in an ambulance.

Loosli and Roy were caught with 50 km (31 mi) left to race, as the finishing circuit in Agrigento began. Slipstream–Chipotle had been at the head of the peloton, protecting race leader Christian Vande Velde, for as long as they could, and during the circuit LPR Brakes–Ballan took over the pace-making. The hilly and difficult circuit made it so many riders lost contact with the leading group, until only a small number of climbers and overall favorites were with the leaders. Joaquim Rodríguez was the first of this group to attack for the stage win, but he was caught in the final few hundred meters by a quintet of Italians, Riccardo Riccò, Danilo Di Luca, Davide Rebellin, Franco Pellizotti, and Paolo Savoldelli. Riccò was the first across the line for the stage win, while Pellizotti's ten second time gap over Vande Velde in 19th gave him the pink jersey.

Stage 2 result

	Rider	Team	Time
1	Riccardo Riccò (ITA)	Saunier Duval–Scott	5h 48' 35"
2	Danilo Di Luca (ITA)	LPR Brakes–Ballan	s.t.
3	Davide Rebellin (ITA)	Gerolsteiner	s.t.
4	Franco Pellizotti (ITA)	Liquigas	s.t.
5	Paolo Savoldelli (ITA)	LPR Brakes–Ballan	s.t.
6	Joaquim Rodríguez (ESP)	Caisse d'Epargne	s.t.
7	Jussi Veikkanen (FIN)	Française des Jeux	+ 4"
8	Vincenzo Nibali (ITA)	Liquigas	+ 8"
9	Leonardo Piepoli (ITA)	Saunier Duval–Scott	+ 8"
10	Andreas Klöden (GER)	Astana	+ 10"

General classification after stage 2

	Rider	Team	Time
1	Franco Pellizotti (ITA)	Liquigas	6h 15' 16"
2	Christian Vande Velde (USA)	Slipstream–Chipotle	+ 1"
3	Chris Anker Sørensen (DEN)	Team CSC	+ 7"
4	Danilo Di Luca (ITA)	LPR Brakes–Ballan	+ 7"
5	Morris Possoni (ITA)	Team High Road	+ 8"
6	Vincenzo Nibali (ITA)	Liquigas	+ 8"
7	Nicki Sørensen (DEN)	Team CSC	+ 17"
8	Bradley McGee (AUS)	Team CSC	+ 17"
9	Kanstantsin Sivtsov (BLR)	Team High Road	+ 18"
10	Paolo Savoldelli (ITA)	LPR Brakes–Ballan	+ 19"

== Stage 3 ==
12 May 2008 — Catania to Milazzo, 221 km (137 mi)

This was the first flat stage of the 2008 Giro. The course began by riding around the perimeter of Mount Etna for a categorized climb, but the final 120 km (75 mi) on the seaside of Milazzo were all on elevations of less than 100 m (328 ft), and a sprint finish was the result.

The first attempt at a breakaway in this stage did not occur until the 70 km (43 mi) mark, as the Mount Etna climb kept the peloton together. At that point, Riccardo Chiarini, Mickaël Buffaz, Jérémy Roy, Kevin Seeldraeyers, Matej Jurčo, and Pavel Brutt broke free and attained a maximum advantage of four minutes. The peloton was careful not to let the time gap get out of hand, and for much of the stage it was only two minutes. A massive crash occurred at the 70 km (43 mi) to go mark, when a rider struck a manhole cover and lost control of his bike, colliding with other riders and sending riders and bikes flying. Rain began to fall shortly thereafter, with further crashes claiming victims including Mark Cavendish, Kanstantsin Sivtsov, and the previous day's stage winner Riccardo Riccò.

The breakaway was caught with 30 km (19 mi) left to race, after which even more crashes occurred. Bradley McGee was taken from the race in an ambulance with a broken collarbone, and though his Team CSC teammate Stuart O'Grady finished the stage after crashing, it was later learned that he too had broken his collarbone.

The succession of crashes did not stop a mass sprint finish, through what was ironically thought the most dangerous part of the course before the stage began. Liquigas' Daniele Bennati outmaneuvered Erik Zabel and Danilo Hondo at the finish to claim the stage win and the points jersey. Liquigas also retained the overall race lead with Franco Pellizotti, as well as first in the teams classification. It was Bennati's first career Giro stage win after having previously won stages in the Tour de France and the Vuelta a España.

Stage 3 result

	Rider	Team	Time
1	Daniele Bennati (ITA)	Liquigas	5h 37' 01"
2	Erik Zabel (GER)	Team Milram	s.t.
3	Danilo Hondo (GER)	Diquigiovanni–Androni	s.t.
4	Thomas Fothen (GER)	Gerolsteiner	s.t.
5	Alberto Loddo (ITA)	Tinkoff Credit Systems	s.t.
6	Koldo Fernández (ESP)	Euskaltel–Euskadi	s.t.
7	Tiziano Dall'Antonia (ITA)	CSF Group–Navigare	s.t.
8	Marlon Pérez Arango (COL)	Caisse d'Epargne	s.t.
9	Mark Cavendish (GBR)	Team High Road	s.t.
10	Oscar Gatto (ITA)	Gerolsteiner	s.t.

General classification after stage 3

	Rider	Team	Time
1	Franco Pellizotti (ITA)	Liquigas	11h 52' 17"
2	Christian Vande Velde (USA)	Slipstream–Chipotle	+ 1"
3	Danilo Di Luca (ITA)	LPR Brakes–Ballan	+ 7"
4	Morris Possoni (ITA)	Team High Road	+ 8"
5	Vincenzo Nibali (ITA)	Liquigas	+ 8"
6	Nicki Sørensen (DEN)	Team CSC	+ 17"
7	Kanstantsin Sivtsov (BLR)	Team High Road	+ 18"
8	Paolo Savoldelli (ITA)	LPR Brakes–Ballan	+ 19"
9	Andrea Noè (ITA)	Liquigas	+ 22"
10	Enrico Gasparotto (ITA)	Barloworld	+ 25"

== Stage 4 ==
13 May 2008 — Pizzo Calabro to Catanzaro-Lungomare, 183 km (114 mi)

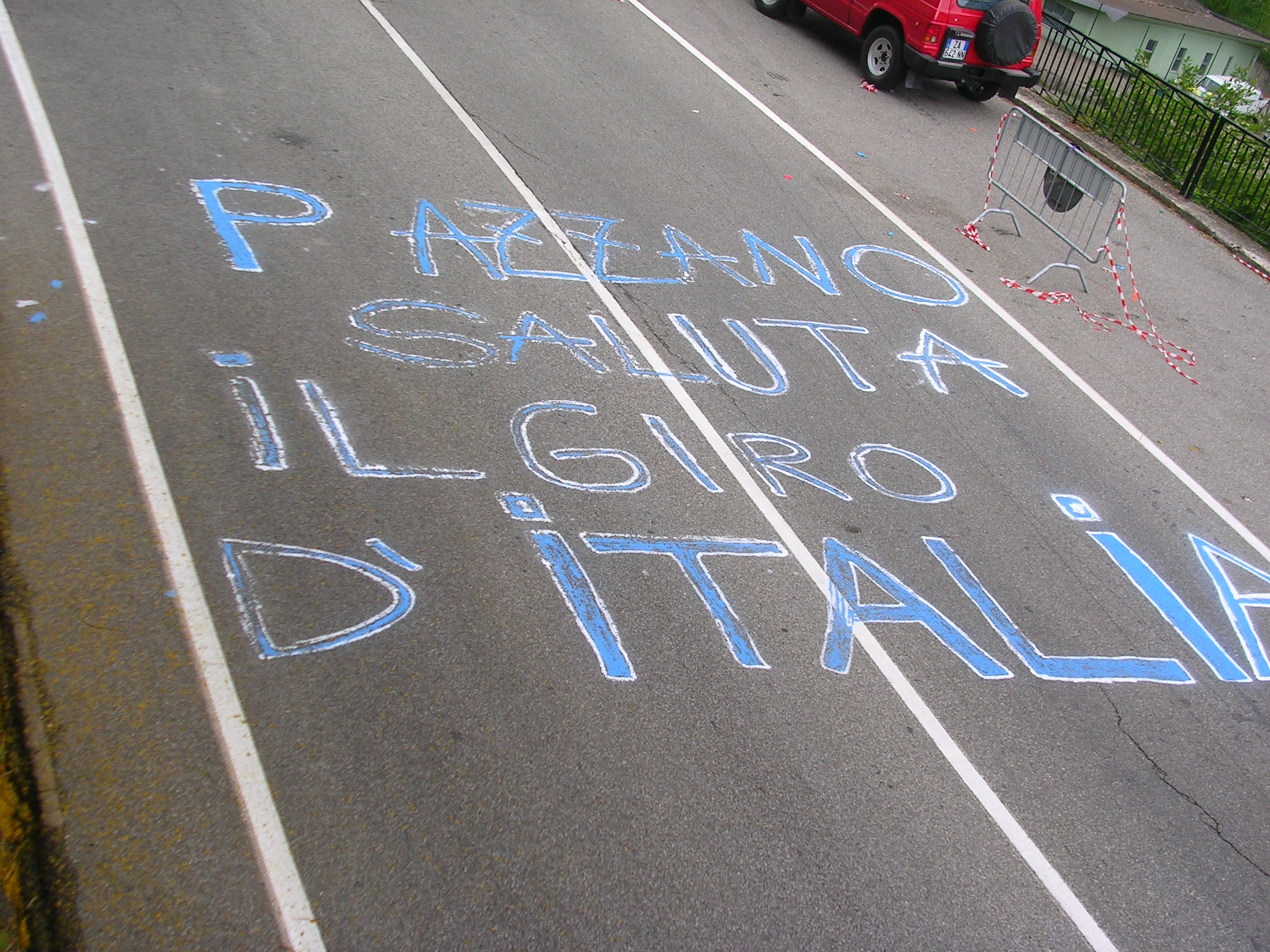
Street writing commemorating the passage of the Giro d'Italia.

In this stage, the Giro left Sicily for Italy's mainland. The course for this stage was similar in profile to the one previous, with a high climb coming in the first third of the course before sufficient flat racing to ensure a mass sprint finish.

This stage was marked by a long one-man breakaway by Cofidis rider Rik Verbrugghe. He attained an advantage of eleven minutes over the peloton at one point, but he stood little chance of staying away on a course well-suited for a bunch finish. He was caught with 19 km (12 mi) left to race, as Team Milram, Team High Road, and Liquigas worked to get the field together, in preparation for a finish for their strong sprinters. Milram led Erik Zabel out early, but the veteran German was unable to hold on all the way to the finish line. Points classification leader Daniele Bennati was next to try, but he too went too soon and was passed for the win by High Road's Mark Cavendish, who picked up his first career Grand Tour stage win. A crash in the final kilometer, as the sprint was just beginning, brought down Nick Nuyens and two CSF Group–Navigare riders, with Nuyens breaking his collarbone and leaving the race in an ambulance.

Stage 4 result

	Rider	Team	Time
1	Mark Cavendish (GBR)	Team High Road	4h 49' 09"
2	Robert Förster (GER)	Gerolsteiner	s.t.
3	Daniele Bennati (ITA)	Liquigas	s.t.
4	Assan Bazayev (KAZ)	Astana	s.t.
5	Mirco Lorenzetto (ITA)	Lampre	s.t.
6	Erik Zabel (GER)	Team Milram	s.t.
7	Robbie McEwen (AUS)	Silence–Lotto	s.t.
8	Tony Martin (GER)	Team High Road	s.t.
9	Paolo Bettini (ITA)	Quick-Step	s.t.
10	Koldo Fernández (ESP)	Euskaltel–Euskadi	s.t.

General classification after stage 4

	Rider	Team	Time
1	Franco Pellizotti (ITA)	Liquigas	16h 41' 26"
2	Christian Vande Velde (USA)	Slipstream–Chipotle	+ 1"
3	Danilo Di Luca (ITA)	LPR Brakes–Ballan	+ 7"
4	Morris Possoni (ITA)	Team High Road	+ 8"
5	Vincenzo Nibali (ITA)	Liquigas	+ 8"
6	Nicki Sørensen (DEN)	Team CSC	+ 17"
7	Kanstantsin Sivtsov (BLR)	Team High Road	+ 18"
8	Paolo Savoldelli (ITA)	LPR Brakes–Ballan	+ 19"
9	Andrea Noè (ITA)	Liquigas	+ 22"
10	Daniele Bennati (ITA)	Liquigas	+ 24"

== Stage 5 ==
14 May 2008 — Belvedere Marittimo to Contursi Terme, 203 km (126 mi)

This was the first of four medium-mountain stages. One pre-race analysis suggested that the course's rolling profile suited a breakaway surviving to the finish line.

It took several attempts for a successful breakaway to come clear, but by the 20 km (12 mi) mark, Luis Felipe Laverde, Johannes Fröhlinger, David Millar, Pavel Brutt, and Francisco Pérez were away. Pérez had begun the stage 1'57" behind race leader Franco Pellizotti, and as such he was the virtual race leader for much of the stage, as the breakaway held a maximum advantage over the peloton of 7'20" with 63 km (39 mi) left to race. The time gap to the leaders steadily fell from that point, such that Pellizotti's lead did not prove to be in any real danger.

With a final 3 km (1.9 mi) long, uncategorized hill remaining in the stage, the fast-closing pink jersey group, 64 riders strong and containing the race's overall favorites, trailed the five leaders by 1'42". This would prove to be just enough time for the breakaway to be able to decide the stage among themselves. Just as they passed under the red kite indicating 1 km (0.62 mi) to the finish line, and just as Brutt seemed to start his attack for the stage win, the chain on Millar's bicycle snapped, halting the Scot and destroying any chance at a victory for him. An enraged Millar threw his bike over the barricade and, needing to wait for his team car for another, finished 119th on the stage, though he would be credited with the same finishing time as Pérez in fourth. Brutt's attack, which had started just as disaster struck Millar, gave him the stage win. His remaining breakaway mates finished scattered behind him, with the pink jersey group, led home by Paolo Bettini, 31 seconds back.

Stage 5 result

	Rider	Team	Time
1	Pavel Brutt (RUS)	Tinkoff Credit Systems	5h 04' 52"
2	Johannes Fröhlinger (GER)	Gerolsteiner	+ 4"
3	Luis Felipe Laverde (COL)	CSF Group–Navigare	+ 10"
4	Francisco Pérez (ESP)	Caisse d'Epargne	+ 25"
5	Paolo Bettini (ITA)	Quick-Step	+ 31"
6	Daniele Pietropolli (ITA)	LPR Brakes–Ballan	+ 31"
7	Riccardo Riccò (ITA)	Saunier Duval–Scott	+ 31"
8	Franco Pellizotti (ITA)	Liquigas	+ 31"
9	Jussi Veikkanen (FIN)	Française des Jeux	+ 31"
10	Alberto Contador (ESP)	Astana	+ 31"

General classification after stage 5

	Rider	Team	Time
1	Franco Pellizotti (ITA)	Liquigas	21h 46' 49"
2	Christian Vande Velde (USA)	Slipstream–Chipotle	+ 1"
3	Danilo Di Luca (ITA)	LPR Brakes–Ballan	+ 7"
4	Morris Possoni (ITA)	Team High Road	+ 8"
5	Vincenzo Nibali (ITA)	Liquigas	+ 8"
6	Nicki Sørensen (DEN)	Team CSC	+ 17"
7	Kanstantsin Sivtsov (BLR)	Team High Road	+ 18"
8	Paolo Savoldelli (ITA)	LPR Brakes–Ballan	+ 19"
9	Andrea Noè (ITA)	Liquigas	+ 22"
10	Enrico Gasparotto (ITA)	Barloworld	+ 25"

== Stage 6 ==
15 May 2008 — Potenza to Peschici, 231.6 km (143.9 mi)

This stage was originally scheduled to be 265 km (165 mi) in length. After representatives from the peloton spoke to race officials, voicing concerns over the long transfers from one day's finish town to the next day's start town affording them little time to rest to prepare for such a demanding stage, the 34 km (21 mi) Circuito del Gargano was eliminated.

The resultant course was still quite long, with a bumpy profile that suggested a climber or a sprinter who could climb better than his peers would be the day's winner.

For the first hour, the peloton stayed together, with no breakaway attempts succeeding. On the ascent to and descent from the day's one categorized climb, at the 47 km (29 mi) mark, a twelve-rider breakaway formed, from which would come the riders who contested the stage victory. This group comprised Rene Mandri, Alan Pérez, Paul Martens, Nikolay Trusov, Jason McCartney, Magnus Bäckstedt, Daniele Nardello, Giovanni Visconti, Francesco Gavazzi, Matthias Russ, Maxim Iglinsky, and Matteo Priamo. Before the finish, Mandri was felled by a crash, and had to leave the race.

The peloton let this group get a lead of 16 minutes with 45 km (28 mi) left to race, before Barloworld set to making the chase, but it was much too late to bring them back. The race lead was assured to transfer to one in the breakaway. Russ was the best-placed rider in the General Classification at the beginning of the day, but Visconti was only 13 seconds behind him, meaning their respective finishing positions would likely determine which of them got the next pink jersey.

Priamo and Pérez attacked their breakaway mates in the stage's final kilometer, quickly getting an appreciable gap over them. Bäckstedt tried to follow, but much like his teammate David Millar had had the previous day, mechanical trouble kept him from following. Priamo opened the sprint first and Pérez had no answer, giving the stage win to the Italian.

Visconti finished the stage 7 seconds ahead of Russ, but he had also won the day's intermediate sprint, which afforded 6 bonus seconds. This gave him the pink jersey over Russ by a margin of less than one second. He was also awarded the white jersey after the stage, as he was a few days under the age limit for that classification. Visconti went à bloc in the stage's final few hundred meters, and had to be held upright by team staff after dismounting his bicycle. The peloton, led home by Daniele Bennati, finished 11'34" behind the stage winner.

Priamo's teammate Emanuele Sella, after later testing positive for methoxy polyethylene glycol-epoetin beta (better known as Mircera, an erythropoietin derivative) at an out-of-competition control run by the UCI and confessing to his doping, named Priamo as his supplier, resulting in a four-year ban for Priamo a year later and casting considerable doubt on the legitimacy of this performance.

Stage 6 result

	Rider	Team	Time
1	Matteo Priamo (ITA)	CSF Group–Navigare	5h 24' 49"
2	Alan Pérez (ESP)	Euskaltel–Euskadi	+ 8"
3	Nikolay Trusov (RUS)	Tinkoff Credit Systems	+ 27"
4	Paul Martens (GER)	Gerolsteiner	+ 31"
5	Maxim Iglinsky (KAZ)	Astana	+ 32"
6	Daniele Nardello (ITA)	Diquigiovanni–Androni	+ 36"
7	Francesco Gavazzi (ITA)	Lampre	+ 40"
8	Giovanni Visconti (ITA)	Quick-Step	+ 40"
9	Magnus Bäckstedt (SWE)	Slipstream–Chipotle	+ 43"
10	Matthias Russ (GER)	Gerolsteiner	+ 47"

General classification after stage 6

	Rider	Team	Time
1	Giovanni Visconti (ITA)	Quick-Step	27h 14' 04"
2	Matthias Russ (GER)	Gerolsteiner	+ 0"
3	Daniele Nardello (ITA)	Diquigiovanni–Androni	+ 1' 22"
4	Alan Pérez (ESP)	Euskaltel–Euskadi	+ 4' 42"
5	Francesco Gavazzi (ITA)	Lampre	+ 5' 33"
6	Matteo Priamo (ITA)	CSF Group–Navigare	+ 9' 07"
7	Franco Pellizotti (ITA)	Liquigas	+ 9' 08"
8	Danilo Di Luca (ITA)	LPR Brakes–Ballan	+ 9' 15"
9	Morris Possoni (ITA)	Team High Road	+ 9' 16"
10	Vincenzo Nibali (ITA)	Liquigas	+ 9' 16"

== Stage 7 ==
16 May 2008 — Vasto to Pescocostanzo, 180 km (112 mi)

This was the first time the Giro ever visited Pescocostanzo, in the region of Abruzzo. The course favored a strong climber, as it featured numerous uncategorized rises in elevation in the first 100 km (62 mi) and then two categorized climbs later, as well as an uphill finish.

It took 55 km (34 mi) for the significant breakaway of this stage to form, after several attempts proved unsuccessful and a second selection took place among two large groups that briefly got away. The seven riders out front for the bulk of the stage were Emanuele Sella, Joan Horrach, Fortunato Baliani, Simon Špilak, Félix Cárdenas, Gabriele Bosisio and Vasil Kiryienka, who had been the original instigator of the breakaway. Numerous splits occurred among this group and the 32-strong group between them and the pink jersey's peloton, with time gaps and exact makeups of each group varying wildly as the stage went on.

The stage win went to Bosisio, reaching the finish line 46 seconds ahead of Kiryienka and over a minute ahead of his fellow breakaway mates. His team LPR Brakes–Ballan had wanted to try to have their leader Danilo Di Luca take the stage win, as Di Luca is from the area where the stage ended. But when Bosisio seemed to be in a winning breakaway and informed his teammates that he had the legs to try for the stage win, the team changed their plans. The race's overall contenders, who had been in the second group on the road, closed the gap to the breakaway as the stage ended, and finished just over two minutes behind Bosisio. Another large group was led home by Davide Rebellin 2'55" back, with most of the other riders finishing alone or in pairs between that group and two large gruppetto 24 and 28 minutes back. Race leader Giovanni Visconti finished 29th, 3'52" behind the stage winners and conceding nearly two minutes to the top GC riders, but he had more than enough time in hand to retain the pink jersey.

Stage 7 result

	Rider	Team	Time
1	Gabriele Bosisio (ITA)	LPR Brakes–Ballan	4h 45' 05"
2	Vasil Kiryienka (BLR)	Tinkoff Credit Systems	+ 46"
3	Emanuele Sella (ITA)	CSF Group–Navigare	+ 1' 02"
4	Félix Cárdenas (COL)	Barloworld	+ 1' 33"
5	Danilo Di Luca (ITA)	LPR Brakes–Ballan	+ 2' 04"
6	Riccardo Riccò (ITA)	Saunier Duval–Scott	+ 2' 04"
7	Leonardo Piepoli (ITA)	Saunier Duval–Scott	+ 2' 07"
8	Alberto Contador (ESP)	Astana	+ 2' 10"
9	Davide Rebellin (ITA)	Gerolsteiner	+ 2' 55"
10	Franco Pellizotti (ITA)	Liquigas	+ 2' 55"

General classification after stage 7

	Rider	Team	Time
1	Giovanni Visconti (ITA)	Quick-Step	32h 03' 01"
2	Matthias Russ (GER)	Gerolsteiner	+ 9"
3	Gabriele Bosisio (ITA)	LPR Brakes–Ballan	+ 5' 43"
4	Danilo Di Luca (ITA)	LPR Brakes–Ballan	+ 7' 27"
5	Emanuele Sella (ITA)	CSF Group–Navigare	+ 7' 36"
6	Félix Cárdenas (COL)	Barloworld	+ 7' 46"
7	Riccardo Riccò (ITA)	Saunier Duval–Scott	+ 7' 53"
8	Daniele Nardello (ITA)	Diquigiovanni–Androni	+ 7' 53"
9	Alberto Contador (ESP)	Astana	+ 7' 56"
10	Franco Pellizotti (ITA)	Liquigas	+ 8' 11"

== Stage 8 ==
17 May 2008 — Rivisondoli to Tivoli, 208 km (129 mi)

This was a difficult stage, featuring the second-category Forca d'Acero climb at the 57 km (35 mi) mark, and numerous uncategorized climbs later in the stage. Analysis of the course expected it to favor a puncheur, a rider who is not necessarily a pure climber, but one who can put in repeated attacks on courses with such a jagged profile. Speculations for stage winner included Davide Rebellin, Paolo Bettini, and Riccardo Riccò, who went on to contest the finish in a sprint.

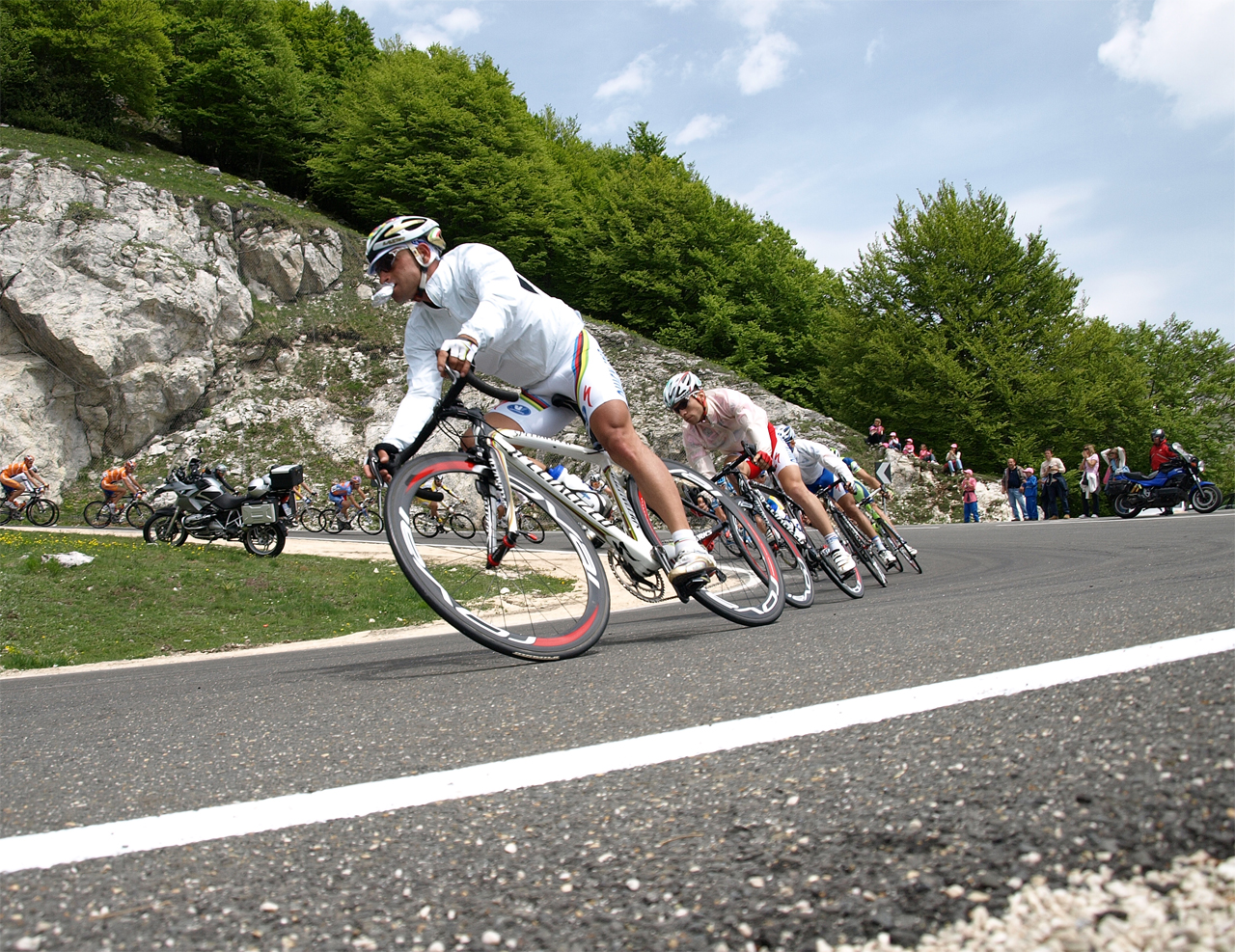
World champion Paolo Bettini leading the peloton on the descent from Forca d'Acero.

It was at the 42 km (26 mi) mark, on the ascent of the Forca d'Acero, that Alessandro Spezialetti, Mathieu Perget, Fortunato Baliani, and Adam Hansen broke free of the peloton. Their maximum advantage hovered between five and six minutes for most of the time they were away. At the 86 km (53 mi) mark, a crash brought down pre-race favorite Alberto Contador, his teammate Steve Morabito, Nicolas Hartmann, and Lander Aperribay. Initially all continued, but Morabito later retired from the Giro, as he had already sustained injuries from a crash earlier in the race.

After the intermediate sprint at the 151 km (94 mi) mark, the Quick-Step-led peloton set to making the chase in earnest. This was both to protect race leader Giovanni Visconti and to try to get Paolo Bettini in position for a stage win, as the stage's uphill finish favored him. With 15 km (9.3 mi) left, the gap from the leaders to the pink jersey peloton was below one minute, prompting Hansen to try a solo escape for the stage victory. He attained thirty seconds advantage quickly, as the other four were caught by the peloton, but Hansen too was caught with some 3 km (1.9 mi) left. A 39-rider group contested a final sprint finish, won by Riccardo Riccò. The win was Riccò's second stage victory of this Giro, and gave him leadership in the points classification after the stage. Visconti finished with the leaders and retained the pink jersey.

Stage 8 result

	Rider	Team	Time
1	Riccardo Riccò (ITA)	Saunier Duval–Scott	4h 41' 05"
2	Paolo Bettini (ITA)	Quick-Step	s.t.
3	Davide Rebellin (ITA)	Gerolsteiner	s.t.
4	Franco Pellizotti (ITA)	Liquigas	s.t.
5	Daniele Pietropolli (ITA)	LPR Brakes–Ballan	s.t.
6	Danilo Di Luca (ITA)	LPR Brakes–Ballan	s.t.
7	Emanuele Sella (ITA)	CSF Group–Navigare	s.t.
8	Domenico Pozzovivo (ITA)	CSF Group–Navigare	s.t.
9	Paolo Savoldelli (ITA)	LPR Brakes–Ballan	s.t.
10	Félix Cárdenas (COL)	Barloworld	s.t.

General classification after stage 8

	Rider	Team	Time
1	Giovanni Visconti (ITA)	Quick-Step	36h 44' 06"
2	Matthias Russ (GER)	Gerolsteiner	+ 34"
3	Gabriele Bosisio (ITA)	LPR Brakes–Ballan	+ 5' 53"
4	Danilo Di Luca (ITA)	LPR Brakes–Ballan	+ 7' 27"
5	Riccardo Riccò (ITA)	Saunier Duval–Scott	+ 7' 33"
6	Emanuele Sella (ITA)	CSF Group–Navigare	+ 7' 36"
7	Félix Cárdenas (COL)	Barloworld	+ 7' 46"
8	Alberto Contador (ESP)	Astana	+ 7' 56"
9	Franco Pellizotti (ITA)	Liquigas	+ 8' 11"
10	Vincenzo Nibali (ITA)	Liquigas	+ 8' 19"

== Stage 9 ==
18 May 2008 — Civitavecchia to San Vincenzo, 218 km (135 mi)

This was a fairly straightforward stage that would almost assuredly end in a mass sprint. The course featured one small categorized climb, but it was no hindrance to the fast men being together at the finish.

Two riders broke free of the peloton almost immediately after the stage began; these were Mickaël Buffaz and Yuriy Krivtsov. They attained a maximum advantage of over 11 minutes, but the peloton had no trouble catching them, as they did with some 20 km (12 mi) left to race. At that point, Paolo Bettini, Emanuele Sella, and Riccardo Riccò broke away. Though those three did attain a small gap, it was clear that the peloton, paced by Team High Road in the stage's final kilometers, would not allow any finish but a group sprint, so they dropped back. After Oscar Gatto opened the sprint 300 m (980 ft) from the finish line, Daniele Bennati, Bettini, Robbie McEwen, and Erik Zabel came around him to finish the stage in that order. Bennati regained the lead in the points classification from Riccò with the victory.

Stage 9 result

	Rider	Team	Time
1	Daniele Bennati (ITA)	Liquigas	5h 30' 06"
2	Paolo Bettini (ITA)	Quick-Step	s.t.
3	Robbie McEwen (AUS)	Silence–Lotto	s.t.
4	Erik Zabel (GER)	Team Milram	s.t.
5	Koldo Fernández (ESP)	Euskaltel–Euskadi	s.t.
6	Robert Förster (GER)	Gerolsteiner	s.t.
7	Mark Cavendish (GBR)	Team High Road	s.t.
8	Tiziano Dall'Antonia (ITA)	CSF Group–Navigare	s.t.
9	Julian Dean (NZL)	Slipstream–Chipotle	s.t.
10	Alexandre Usov (BLR)	Ag2r–La Mondiale	s.t.

General classification after stage 9

	Rider	Team	Time
1	Giovanni Visconti (ITA)	Quick-Step	42h 14' 16"
2	Matthias Russ (GER)	Gerolsteiner	+ 34"
3	Gabriele Bosisio (ITA)	LPR Brakes–Ballan	+ 5' 53"
4	Danilo Di Luca (ITA)	LPR Brakes–Ballan	+ 7' 27"
5	Emanuele Sella (ITA)	CSF Group–Navigare	+ 7' 32"
6	Riccardo Riccò (ITA)	Saunier Duval–Scott	+ 7' 33"
7	Félix Cárdenas (COL)	Barloworld	+ 7' 46"
8	Alberto Contador (ESP)	Astana	+ 7' 56"
9	Franco Pellizotti (ITA)	Liquigas	+ 8' 11"
10	Vincenzo Nibali (ITA)	Liquigas	+ 8' 15"

== Stage 10 ==
20 May 2008 — Pesaro to Urbino, 39.4 km (24.5 mi) (individual time trial)

The Giro's first individual time trial (ITT), which took place after the Giro's first rest day, featured a course that favored specialists in the discipline. Its first half was flat. The second half included the Monte di Colbordolo, which featured a maximum gradient of 12%, but was otherwise not imposing.

The early time to beat was set by Team High Road's Tony Martin, who clocked in at 58'54", one of the first to stop the clock in under an hour. Tinkoff Credit Systems rider Vasil Kiryienka, who had featured in several breakaways in past stages, passed many riders who started minutes before him, but faded toward the finish and ended up 10 seconds slower than Martin. The first rider to best Martin's time was from Astana, who were expected to excel in the ITT as they had several strong time trialists on their squad. This was Vladimir Gusev, who posted a time of 58'46". Italian national time trial champion Marco Pinotti of Team High Road quickly knocked off Gusev, finishing the course in 57'17". Shortly after Pinotti finished, Astana's Andreas Klöden and Lampre's Marzio Bruseghin were setting new best times at the intermediate time checks, with Bruseghin stopping the clock at 56'41", which held up for the stage win by a margin of 20 seconds over Klöden and 8 over Klöden's teammate and team leader Alberto Contador. Contador's performance moved him from eighth to fourth in the overall classification after the stage. The last two men on course were Matthias Russ and race leader Giovanni Visconti, still in high positions because of their Stage 6 breakaway. Visconti passed Russ on the road at one point, and gained nearly three minutes over him to extend his overall lead.

Stage 10 result

	Rider	Team	Time
1	Marzio Bruseghin (ITA)	Lampre	56' 41"
2	Alberto Contador (ESP)	Astana	+ 8"
3	Andreas Klöden (GER)	Astana	+ 20"
4	Marco Pinotti (ITA)	Team High Road	+ 36"
5	Paolo Savoldelli (ITA)	LPR Brakes–Ballan	+ 44"
6	Denis Menchov (RUS)	Rabobank	+ 46"
7	Vincenzo Nibali (ITA)	Liquigas	+ 54"
8	Gustav Larsson (SWE)	Team CSC	+ 59"
9	Levi Leipheimer (USA)	Astana	+ 1' 01"
10	Gilberto Simoni (ITA)	Diquigiovanni–Androni	+ 1' 02"

General classification after stage 10

	Rider	Team	Time
1	Giovanni Visconti (ITA)	Quick-Step	43h 12' 02"
2	Matthias Russ (GER)	Gerolsteiner	+ 3' 31"
3	Gabriele Bosisio (ITA)	LPR Brakes–Ballan	+ 5' 50"
4	Alberto Contador (ESP)	Astana	+ 6' 59"
5	Marzio Bruseghin (ITA)	Lampre	+ 7' 52"
6	Andreas Klöden (GER)	Astana	+ 7' 54"
7	Vincenzo Nibali (ITA)	Liquigas	+ 8' 04"
8	Paolo Savoldelli (ITA)	LPR Brakes–Ballan	+ 8' 09"
9	Riccardo Riccò (ITA)	Saunier Duval–Scott	+ 8' 32"
10	Danilo Di Luca (ITA)	LPR Brakes–Ballan	+ 8' 33"

== Stage 11 ==
21 May 2008 — Urbania to Cesena, 199 km (124 mi)

This was a tough, hilly stage, containing four categorized climbs, including the first-category Monte Carpegna at the 107 km (66 mi) mark. This mountainous stage concluded with an 11.5 km (7.1 mi) finishing circuit in the hometown of Italian cycling legend Marco Pantani.

This day of racing was marked by a consistent downpour of rain, making the course treacherous. At the 42 km (26 mi) mark, a break formed, comprising Laurent Mangel, Pablo Lastras, Tiziano Dall'Antonia, Jussi Veikkanen, and Alessandro Bertolini. Their maximum advantage was over nine minutes, though for the second hour of racing their speed was only 36.4 km/h (22.6 mph), as the rain and the hilly terrain made for slow going.

The breakaway's lead fell more precipitously on the ascent to Monte Carpegna, as an attempted breakaway from Danilo Di Luca and other overall favorites increased the speed of the chase group for a time. At the top of Monte Carpegna, the leaders had five minutes on the main chase group of overall favorites, and seven and a half minutes on race leader Giovanni Visconti.

The rainy descent proved dangerous, as Bertolini and Dall'Antonia both crashed at the 121 km (75 mi) mark, but were able to make it back to the leading group. Further crashes elsewhere resulted in Mauricio Ardila, Christian Pfannberger, Leonardo Piepoli, Levi Leipheimer, Visconti, and Emanuele Sella all taking a tumble. Gabriele Bosisio was almost able to make the bridge from the chase to the leaders, and as such was the "virtual" race leader for a short while, but after crashing he was forced to rejoin the chase pack. Fortunato Baliani, who had been with Bosisio in the bridge attempt, made it to the leaders after a further solo effort. Lastras tried four or five different times to attack the leading group and get free, but he was never able to do so.

Veikkanen and Mangel were dropped by the other four leaders on the last climb of the day, and Bertolini, Lastras, Dall'Antonia, and Baliani were poised to contest a stage finish among themselves. Dall'Antonia ended up crashing in the final few kilometers, and was unable to bridge back to the other three. Baliani lost his balance on the course's last left-hand turn, momentarily disturbing Lastras behind him. This allowed Bertolini, who had been leading out the sprint (ordinarily the least advantageous position in a sprint finish), to claim the first Giro stage win of his sixteen-year career. As the Visconti group was able to finish with the Di Luca group after being two to three minutes behind them for most of the day, the young Italian retained the race lead for another day.

Stage 11 result

	Rider	Team	Time
1	Alessandro Bertolini (ITA)	Diquigiovanni–Androni	5h 44' 22"
2	Pablo Lastras (ESP)	Caisse d'Epargne	+ 5"
3	Fortunato Baliani (ITA)	CSF Group–Navigare	+ 5"
4	Tiziano Dall'Antonia (ITA)	CSF Group–Navigare	+ 41"
5	Laurent Mangel (FRA)	Ag2r–La Mondiale	+ 1' 33"
6	Jussi Veikkanen (FIN)	Française des Jeux	+ 1' 33"
7	Daniele Bennati (ITA)	Liquigas	+ 3' 53"
8	Erik Zabel (GER)	Team Milram	+ 3' 53"
9	Mirco Lorenzetto (ITA)	Lampre	+ 3' 53"
10	Davide Rebellin (ITA)	Gerolsteiner	+ 3' 53"

General classification after stage 11

	Rider	Team	Time
1	Giovanni Visconti (ITA)	Quick-Step	49h 00' 17"
2	Gabriele Bosisio (ITA)	LPR Brakes–Ballan	+ 5' 50"
3	Alberto Contador (ESP)	Astana	+ 6' 59"
4	Marzio Bruseghin (ITA)	Lampre	+ 7' 52"
5	Andreas Klöden (GER)	Astana	+ 7' 54"
6	Vincenzo Nibali (ITA)	Liquigas	+ 8' 04"
7	Paolo Savoldelli (ITA)	LPR Brakes–Ballan	+ 8' 09"
8	Riccardo Riccò (ITA)	Saunier Duval–Scott	+ 8' 32"
9	Danilo Di Luca (ITA)	LPR Brakes–Ballan	+ 8' 33"
10	Gustav Larsson (SWE)	Team CSC	+ 8' 33"
