= 2008 Giro d'Italia =

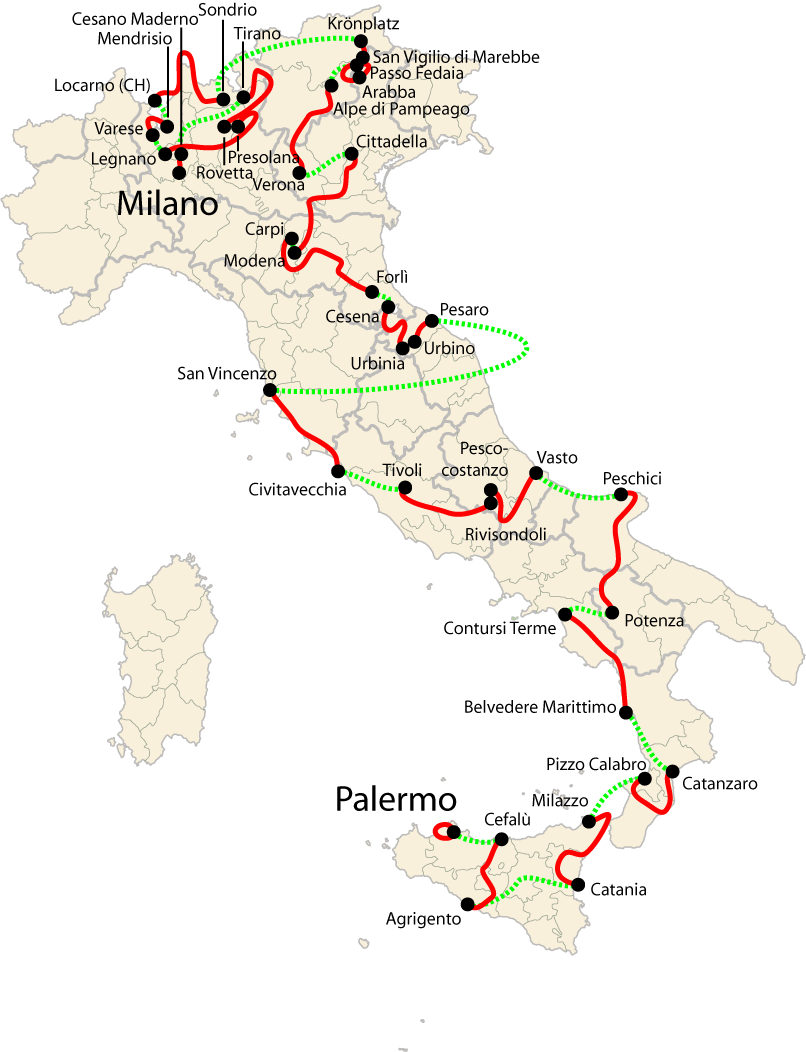
- Overview of the stages: route from Palermo to Milan covered by the riders on the bicycle (red) and distances between stages (green).

Race details
- Dates: 10 May – 1 June 2008
- Stages: 21
- Distance: 3,407 km (2,117 mi)
- Winning time: 89h 56' 49"

Results
Jersey awarded to the overall winner	Winner	Alberto Contador (ESP)	(Astana)
	Second	Riccardo Riccò (ITA)	(Saunier Duval–Scott)
	Third	Marzio Bruseghin (ITA)	(Lampre)
Jersey awarded to the points classification winner	Points	Daniele Bennati (ITA)	(Liquigas)
Jersey awarded to the mountains classification winner	Mountains	Emanuele Sella (ITA)	(CSF Group–Navigare)
Jersey awarded to the young rider classification winner	Young rider	Riccardo Riccò (ITA)	(Saunier Duval–Scott)
	Sprints	Fortunato Baliani (ITA)	(CSF Group–Navigare)
Jersey awarded to the combativity classification winner	Combativity	Emanuele Sella (ITA)	(CSF Group–Navigare)
	Team	CSF Group–Navigare	
	Team points	Liquigas	

The 2008 Giro d'Italia was the 91st running of the Giro d'Italia, one of cycling's Grand Tours. It began in Palermo on 10 May and ended in Milan on 1 June. Twenty-two teams entered the race, which was won by Spaniard Alberto Contador of the Astana cycling team. Second and third respectively were Italians Riccardo Riccò and Marzio Bruseghin.

Contador first took the race lead after the second mountain stage, to Marmolada, by finishing nearly fifteen minutes ahead of previous race leader Gabriele Bosisio. The race's overall classification had been headed for several days beforehand by Giovanni Visconti, who participated in a breakaway in the sixth stage which won him sufficient time to hold the race leader's pink jersey for more than a week. In the race's final week, Contador faced stern challenges from Riccò and defending Giro champion Danilo Di Luca. Though Contador did not win any stage, his performances were consistently strong enough to remain ahead through to the conclusion of the race.

Team CSF Group–Navigare appeared to perform quite well in the race, coming away with four stage wins and victory in the mountains classification and the Trofeo Fast Team. In August 2008, mountains classification winner Emanuele Sella was announced to have tested positive for methoxy polyethylene glycol-epoetin beta (better known as Mircera, an erythropoietin derivative) at an out-of-competition control held by the Union Cycliste Internationale (UCI). He subsequently admitted his doping, and named teammate Matteo Priamo as his supplier. Both riders were subsequently suspended. Though as of April 2010 no definitive positive results have come to light from samples taken during the Giro, retesting of those samples has reportedly revealed six to seven presumptive positives for Mircera. Riccò, who tested positive for the drug at the 2008 Tour de France, is among those suspected of having given positive tests in the Giro, as is Sella.

== Teams ==
Twenty-two teams participated in the 2008 Giro. These included 16 UCI ProTour teams, and six UCI Professional Continental teams. Of the 18 ProTour teams, the two left out were Bouygues Télécom and Crédit Agricole. Two other ProTour teams, Astana and Team High Road, were left off the first list of teams announced by RCS Sport, the organizers of the Giro. This list also included a further Professional Continental team, NGC Medical–OTC Industria Porte, which was later excluded. Astana and Team High Road were both later added, with Astana's invitation coming just six days before the event began.

The 22 teams who took part in the race were:

- Ag2r–La Mondiale
- Astana
- Barloworld
- Caisse d'Epargne
- Cofidis
- CSF Group–Navigare
- Diquigiovanni–Androni
- Euskaltel–Euskadi
- Française des Jeux
- Gerolsteiner
- Lampre
- Liquigas
- LPR Brakes–Ballan
- Quick-Step
- Rabobank
- Saunier Duval–Scott
- Silence–Lotto
- Slipstream–Chipotle
- Team CSC
- Team High Road
- Team Milram
- Tinkoff Credit Systems

== Race previews and favorites ==
The 2008 Giro featured an assortment of contenders for the overall victory. Defending champion Danilo Di Luca had faced potential bans which would have kept him out of the race, after investigations into his involvement with the Oil for Drugs scandal and an irregular doping test given after stage 17 of the 2007 Giro d'Italia, either of which could have resulted in a two-year suspension. Though he was suspended for three months because of Oil for Drugs, he was cleared by the Italian National Olympic Committee of any wrongdoing in the 2007 Giro, and was thus permitted to start.

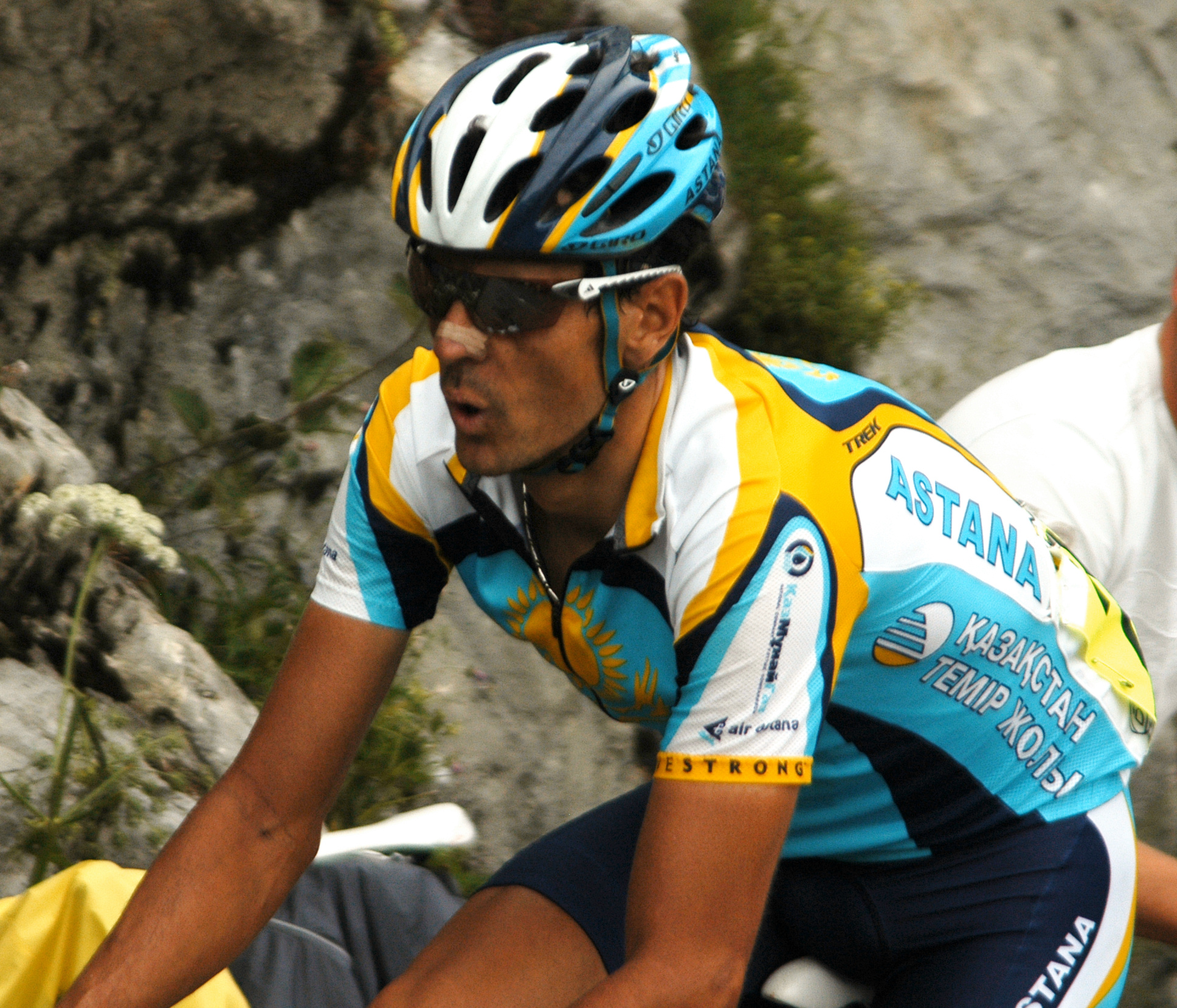
Astana's Andreas Klöden was considered among the race's overall favorites.

The late invitation of Astana to the race provided three potential contenders: 2007 Tour de France winner Alberto Contador, third-place finisher from that race Levi Leipheimer, and Andreas Klöden. One analysis of pre-race favorites considered Klöden to be the strongest of them, while another considered Contador to be the race's biggest favorite after his wins at the recently run Vuelta al País Vasco and Vuelta a Castilla y León. Both Di Luca and Contador had strong domestiques (support riders) by their sides, with Di Luca joined by two-time Giro d'Italia champion Paolo Savoldelli, Gabriele Bosisio, and Alessandro Spezialetti, and Contador by Leipheimer and Klöden. Other riders named as overall contenders included Denis Menchov, Gilberto Simoni, Vincenzo Nibali, Riccardo Riccò, Mauricio Soler, Marzio Bruseghin, Emanuele Sella, Evgeni Petrov, Franco Pellizotti, and Juan Manuel Gárate. Unibet.com's odds-on favorite was Klöden. 2004 Giro d'Italia winner Damiano Cunego chose to skip the race to better prepare for the Tour de France, adding to speculation that this would be the first Giro since 1996 to feature a non-Italian winner.

Six stages were classified as flat and likely to be contested by sprinters. Italian sprinter Alessandro Petacchi, who had notably won nine stages in the 2004 race, did not plan to enter this Giro because of bouts with influenza and bronchitis which hindered his training. He was later suspended from the sport, and his contract with Team Milram terminated, as a result of his controversial doping case from the 2007 Giro. Sprinters identified as being favorites in the bunch finishes that the Giro would offer included Alexandre Usov, Dimitry Muravyev, Enrico Gasparotto, Maximiliano Richeze, Robert Förster, Mark Cavendish, André Greipel, Daniele Bennati, Paolo Bettini, Graeme Brown, Robbie McEwen, Julian Dean, Erik Zabel, and Alberto Loddo. Richeze was withdrawn by his team CSF Group–Navigare the day before the race began after a positive doping test, though he would later be cleared of any wrongdoing. His name remained on the start list, and he was not replaced, meaning CSF Group–Navigare entered the race with only eight riders instead of the customary nine.

== Route and stages ==
The race began for the second year in succession with a team time trial on one of Italy's islands, in this case Sicily (in 2007 it had been Sardinia). The route contained only four stages that were officially deemed mountain stages, but several of the seven intermediate stages contained selective climbs. The Giro had four time trials, three of which were individual and one a team event. Six stages were classified as flat.

The sixth stage was originally scheduled to be 265 km (165 mi) in length, but it was shortened the day before it was to be run. This decision was made because many riders in the race had become upset over the lengths of transfers from the end of one stage to the beginning of the next and that this afforded them little rest to prepare for such long stages. The 34 km (21 mi) Circuito del Gargano was eliminated.

Of the four official mountain stages, three ended with climbs: stage 14 to Alpe di Pampeago, stage 15 to Passo Fedaia, and stage 19 to Presolana. Stage 20 earned its mountain designation by way of the Passo di Gavia and the Passo del Mortirolo, respectively the highest point reached and the steepest climb of this year's Giro. Two other stages had summit arrivals, stage 7 to Pescocostanzo and the demanding stage 16 climbing time trial to Plan de Corones, the summit of which the Giro had never before visited. It was hoped that the number of time trials, including one on the race's last day, would keep the race hotly contested to the end.

Stage characteristics and winners
Stage	Date	Course	Distance	Type	Winner
1	10 May	Palermo	23.6 km (14.7 mi)	Team time trial	Slipstream–Chipotle
2	11 May	Cefalù to Agrigento	207 km (129 mi)	Intermediate stage	Riccardo Riccò (ITA)
3	12 May	Catania to Milazzo	221 km (137 mi)	Flat stage	Daniele Bennati (ITA)
4	13 May	Pizzo Calabro to Catanzaro-Lungomare	183 km (114 mi)	Flat stage	Mark Cavendish (GBR)
5	14 May	Belvedere Marittimo to Contursi Terme	203 km (126 mi)	Intermediate stage	Pavel Brutt (RUS)
6	15 May	Potenza to Peschici	231.6 km (143.9 mi)	Intermediate stage	Matteo Priamo (ITA)
7	16 May	Vasto to Pescocostanzo	180 km (112 mi)	Intermediate stage	Gabriele Bosisio (ITA)
8	17 May	Rivisondoli to Tivoli	208 km (129 mi)	Intermediate stage	Riccardo Riccò (ITA)
9	18 May	Civitavecchia to San Vincenzo	218 km (135 mi)	Flat stage	Daniele Bennati (ITA)
	19 May	Rest day			
10	20 May	Pesaro to Urbino	39.4 km (24.5 mi)	Individual time trial	Marzio Bruseghin (ITA)
11	21 May	Urbania to Cesena	199 km (124 mi)	Intermediate stage	Alessandro Bertolini (ITA)
12	22 May	Forlì to Carpi	172 km (107 mi)	Flat stage	Daniele Bennati (ITA)
13	23 May	Modena to Cittadella	177 km (110 mi)	Flat stage	Mark Cavendish (GBR)
14	24 May	Verona to Alpe di Pampeago	195 km (121 mi)	Mountain stage	Emanuele Sella (ITA)
15	25 May	Arabba to Passo Fedaia	153 km (95 mi)	Mountain stage	Emanuele Sella (ITA)
16	26 May	San Vigilio di Marebbe to Plan de Corones	12.8 km (8.0 mi)	Individual time trial	Franco Pellizotti (ITA)
	27 May	Rest day			
17	28 May	Sondrio to Locarno (Switzerland)	146 km (91 mi)	Flat stage	André Greipel (GER)
18	29 May	Mendrisio (Switzerland) to Varese	147 km (91 mi)	Intermediate stage	Jens Voigt (GER)
19	30 May	Legnano to Presolana	238 km (148 mi)	Mountain stage	Vasil Kiryienka (BLR)
20	31 May	Rovetta to Tirano	224 km (139 mi)	Mountain stage	Emanuele Sella (ITA)
21	1 June	Milan	28.5 km (17.7 mi)	Individual time trial	Marco Pinotti (ITA)
	Total		3,407 km (2,117 mi)		

== Race overview ==
The Giro started with a team time trial in Sicily. There was pre-race speculation that this stage would result in an American rider wearing the pink jersey for the first time in twenty years, as Slipstream–Chipotle, Team CSC, and Astana were among the biggest favorites to win and all had strong American time trialists on their squads. The victory went to Slipstream–Chipotle, which put their team leader, American Christian Vande Velde, in the first pink jersey. With a hilly stage ahead on day two of the Giro, Vande Velde's race lead was far from secure. He lost it to Franco Pellizotti, who finished sufficiently ahead of Vande Velde on the stage to take a lead of a single second in the overall classification. Pellizotti retained the race lead for the next three days, as those stages were flat and were contested by sprinters, with the overall favorites finishing together with the peloton in each.

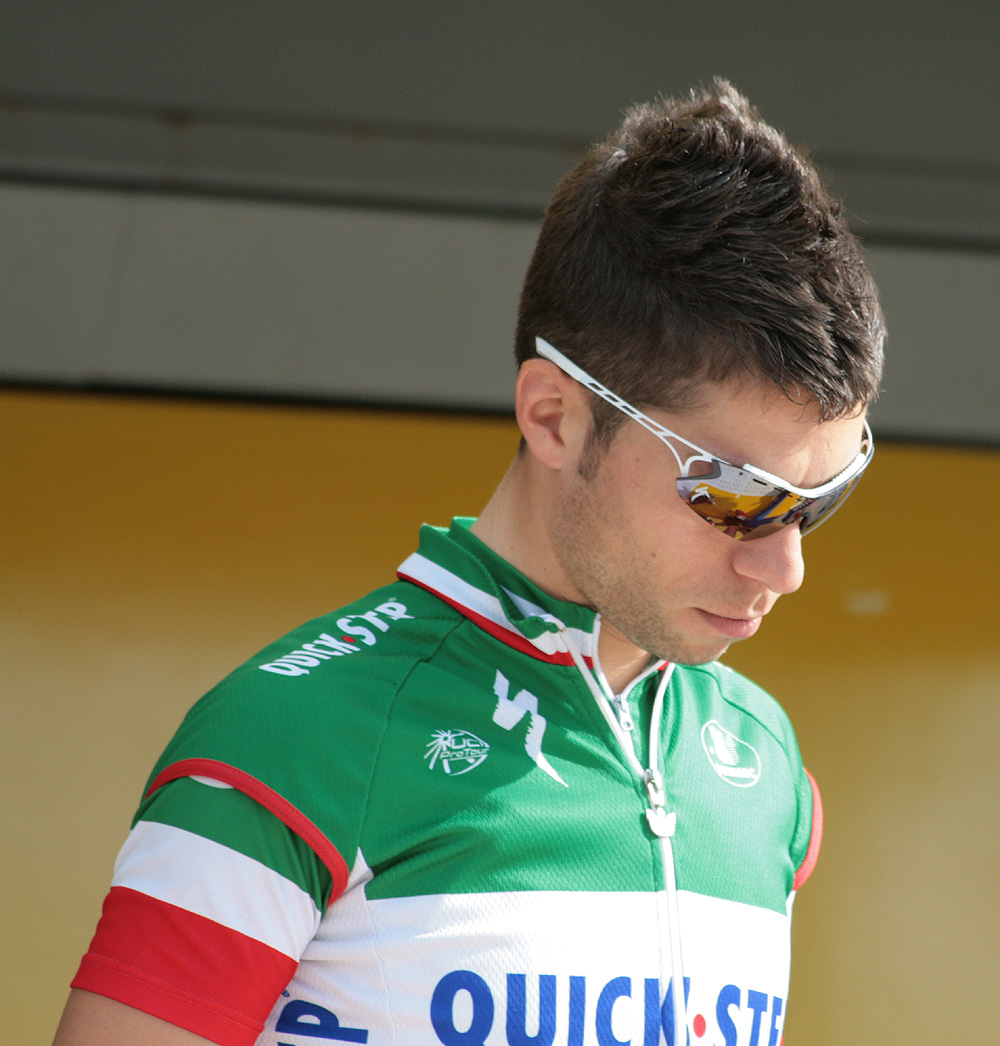
Italian national road race champion Giovanni Visconti was the overall leader of the Giro for eight stages.

The sixth stage was shortened from its original length of 265 km (165 mi) to 231.6 km (143.9 mi). This was still the race's second-longest stage, and it featured a breakaway which shook up the race standings. Eleven riders finished nearly twelve minutes in front of the peloton, and reigning Italian national road race champion Giovanni Visconti assumed the race lead, by a margin of less than one second over fellow breakaway member Matthias Russ. Russ had begun the stage 13 seconds ahead of Visconti in the overall classification, but with Visconti gaining seven seconds on Russ at the finish line and six in bonification on the stage's intermediate sprint, the young Italian became the next to wear the pink jersey. Visconti and his team Quick-Step ably defended the jersey for nine days, keeping it through the hilly seventh and eighth stages, as well as in the individual time trial in stage 11 and in three flat stages. Visconti eventually lost the lead on stage 14, the Giro's first stage categorized as high mountain, as he finished more than eighteen minutes behind stage winner Emanuele Sella. The race lead passed to Gabriele Bosisio after that stage, but he was unable to hold it the next day, finishing fifteen minutes behind Sella, again the stage winner. It was on this stage that Alberto Contador took the lead that he would never relinquish.

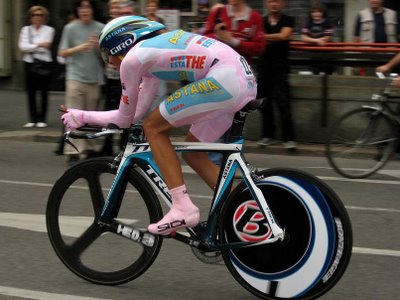
Giro champion Alberto Contador during the stage 21 individual time trial.

Contador faced repeated challenges from Riccardo Riccò and Danilo Di Luca in the race's final week. They were separated by less than a minute after stage 15, and though Di Luca would falter slightly in the Giro's second individual time trial, the time gap among the three of them was just 21 seconds heading in to the Giro's final mountain stage. Di Luca faltered further in that last mountain stage, losing almost five minutes and any chance to repeat as Giro champion, but Contador and Riccò finished together and were separated by only four seconds going into the Giro's final stage, another individual time trial. Contador's superior time trial skills provided the difference in the Giro's finale. Though he finished 11th on the stage, he gained almost two minutes over Riccò, winning the Giro overall without taking any individual stage.

Emanuele Sella of CSF Group–Navigare won three stages in the race's final week and took a convincing victory in the mountains classification, leading it for the entire race. His subsequent positive tests and confessions to the use of performance-enhancing drugs outside the Giro cast serious doubt on the legitimacy of these results, however. Daniele Bennati was nearly as dominant in winning the points classification, taking three stage wins and six other top-ten finishes. He led the classification after every stage except the second and eighth, which were both won by Riccò, who thereby gained the mauve jersey for one day on two separate occasions. Though Riccò was never able to take the overall race lead, he was the winner of the youth classification, taking the white jersey from Visconti when he lost the overall lead and holding it through the conclusion of the race. That jersey had also previously passed over the shoulders of Chris Anker Sørensen and Morris Possoni.

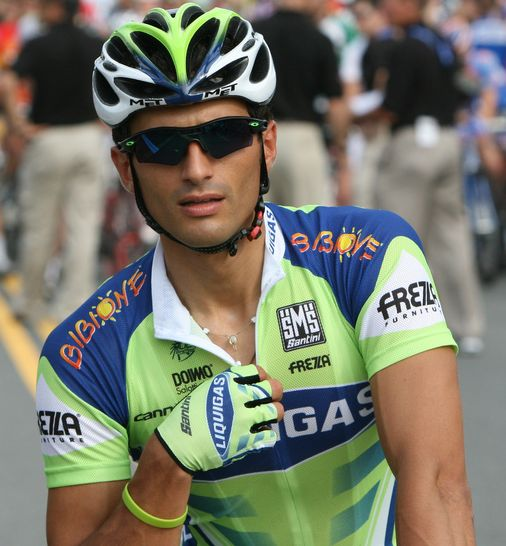
Italian sprinter Daniele Bennati won three stages and the mauve jersey for the points classification.

Five teams repeated as stage winners. Four individual riders won multiple stages. In addition to Sella's three victories in the final week, the riders who won more than once were Riccardo Riccò in stages 2 and 8, Daniele Bennati in stages 3, 9, and 12, and Mark Cavendish in stages 4 and 13. Tinkoff Credit Systems also won multiple stages, with Pavel Brutt in stage 5 and Vasil Kiryienka in stage 19, after both figured into early morning breakaway groups.

Slipstream–Chipotle, Lampre, LPR Brakes–Ballan, Diquigiovanni–Androni, and Team CSC all won one stage apiece. Slipstream–Chipotle won the opening team time trial, Lampre rider Marzio Bruseghin won the Giro's first individual time trial, LPR Brakes–Ballan rider Gabriele Bosisio won stage 7 from a morning escape, Diquigiovanni–Androni's Alessandro Bertolini took stage 11 from a breakaway, and Team CSC veteran Jens Voigt was the winner of stage 18.

Success was achieved by only a handful of teams, meaning that other teams did not achieve much in the race. Though they nearly took the race lead with Matthias Russ in stage 6, Gerolsteiner had just two riders finish the race, and were never otherwise close to a notable result. Euskaltel–Euskadi had only four riders finish the race. Two other ProTour teams, Cofidis and Française des Jeux, similarly failed to be at all competitive in the Giro. None of them would return to the Giro in 2009; Gerolsteiner folded in 2008 after being unable to locate a new sponsor while Euskaltel–Euskadi, Cofidis, and Française des Jeux all made it known that they did not wish to participate and were thus declined invitations.

=== Doping ===
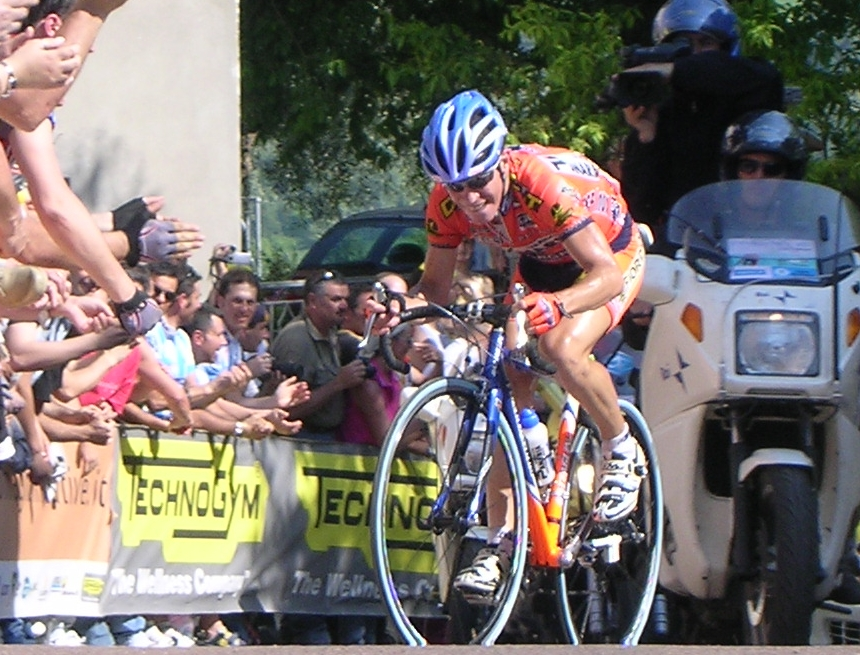
Emanuele Sella, pictured here in 2004, won the climber's prize and three stages in the Giro, but is suspected to have used performance-enhancing drugs to achieve those results.

Several notable riders in the Giro were announced to have tested positive for banned performance-enhancing drugs after the race concluded. Prominent amongst them was CSF Group–Navigare rider Emanuele Sella, a triple stage winner, winner of the mountains classification, and a key rider to CSF Group–Navigare's victory in the teams classification. It was announced on 5 August that Sella had tested positive for Methoxy polyethylene glycol-epoetin beta, better known as Mircera, a third-generation form of the banned blood booster erythropoietin. At the time the Giro was run, the test for Mircera was still in development. An out-of-competition control was taken on 23 July, just days after positives from the 2008 Tour de France had come to light, and samples were sent to labs in Paris for analysis. UCI President Pat McQuaid said that Sella had been targeted in the control and that "[i]t wasn't rocket science" to conclude that Sella's performances in the Giro could have been artificially enhanced.

Sella confessed his doping to the Italian National Olympic Committee (CONI) and named teammate Matteo Priamo, also a stage winner in this Giro, as his supplier. Though Priamo never tested positive for anything, and though the Italian National Anti-Doping tribunal originally exonerated him, the Court of Arbitration for Sport ruled, upon appeal by CONI, that he should be suspended for four years.

Riccardo Riccò, a double stage winner and the best young rider, tested positive for Mircera during the Tour de France, and was subsequently expelled with his team Saunier Duval–Scott. This control was taken just days before the one at which Sella gave his positive. Since it took place during the Tour de France, Riccò's results from that race have been removed, but the results for Sella, Priamo, and Riccò all still stand as no positive tests from controls taken during the Giro have come to light. Riccò claims to have only taken the drug before the Tour, but there has been speculation that his performances in the Giro were not legitimate. Sella has similarly confessed to taking the drug while not confessing to have used it during the Giro.

After repeated positives over the summer, including tests from Leonardo Piepoli and Bernhard Kohl at the Tour de France, and Davide Rebellin and Stefan Schumacher from the 2008 Olympic Games, the UCI has sought to have samples taken during the Giro retested. In October 2009, it was announced that six to seven riders from this Giro had presumptive positives, while further untestable doping involving ozone was also suspected. In total, 82 samples were retested, and the presumptive positives have been compared to values stored at an anti-doping lab in Lausanne, Switzerland. The identities of those riders who tested positive have not yet been revealed. It is believed that Rebellin and Sella are among the riders to have presumptive positives.

== Classification leadership ==
In the 2008 Giro d'Italia, four different jerseys were awarded. For the general classification, calculated by adding each cyclist's finishing times on each stage, and allowing time bonuses for the first three finishers on mass start stages, the leader received a pink jersey. This classification is considered the most important of the Giro d'Italia, and the winner is considered the winner of the Giro.

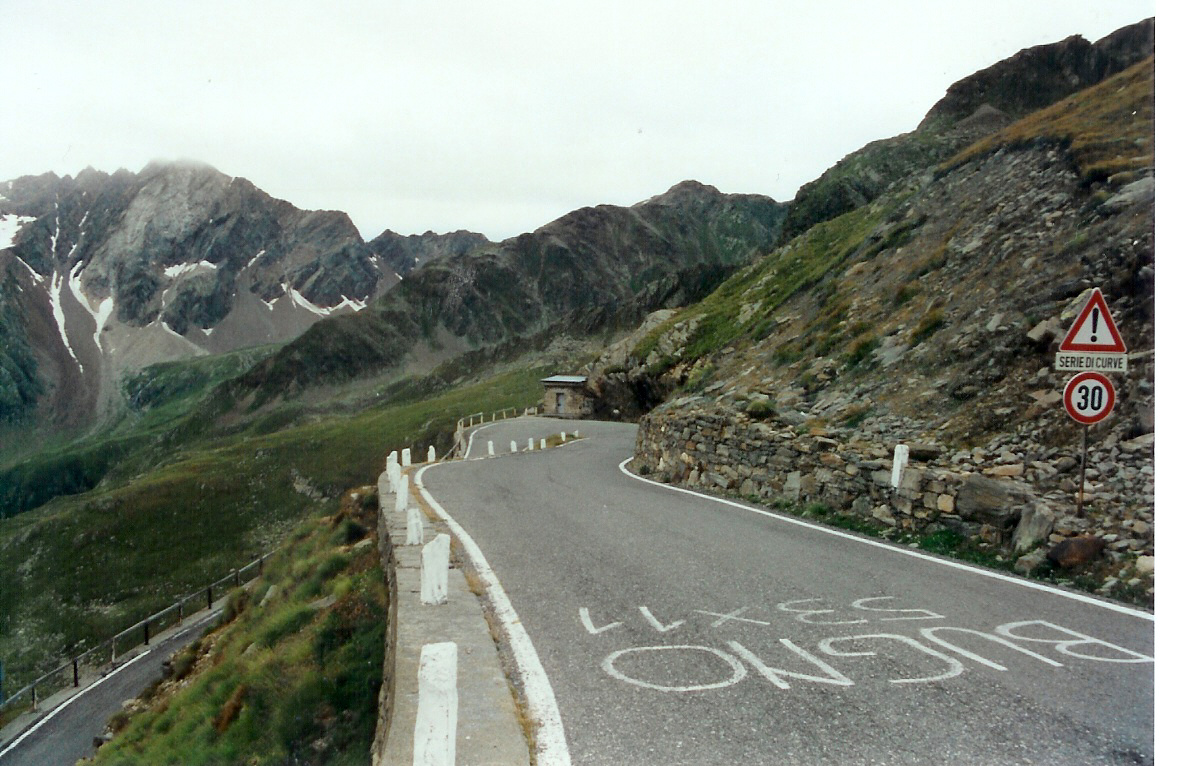
The Passo di Gavia, the highest point reached in the 2008 Giro d'Italia

Additionally, there was a points classification, which awarded a mauve jersey. In the points classification, cyclists got points for finishing in the top 15 in a stage. The stage win awarded 25 points, second place awarded 20 points, third 16, fourth 14, fifth 12, sixth 10, and one point less per place down the line, to a single point for 15th. In addition, some points could be won in intermediate sprints.

There was also a mountains classification, which awarded a green jersey. In the mountains classifications, points were won by reaching the top of a mountain before other cyclists. Each climb was categorized, either first, second, or third category, with more points available for the higher-categorized climbs. The highest point in the Giro (called the Cima Coppi), which in 2008 was the Passo di Gavia in Stage 20, afforded still more points than the other first-category climbs.

The fourth was the young rider classification which awarded a white jersey. This was decided the same way as the general classification, but only riders born after 1 January 1983 were eligible.

There were also two classifications for teams. The first is the Trofeo Fast Team. In this classification, the times of the best three cyclists per team on each stage are added, and the team with the lowest time is leading team. The Trofeo Super Team is a team points classification, with the top 20 placed riders on each stage earning points (20 for first place, 19 for second place and so on, down to a single point for 20th) for their team.

The rows in the following table correspond to the jerseys awarded after that stage was run.

Stage	Winner	General classification	Points classification	Mountains classification	Young rider classification
1	Slipstream–Chipotle	Christian Vande Velde	no award	no award	Chris Anker Sørensen
2	Riccardo Riccò	Franco Pellizotti	Riccardo Riccò	Emanuele Sella	Chris Anker Sørensen
3	Daniele Bennati	Franco Pellizotti	Daniele Bennati	Emanuele Sella	Morris Possoni
4	Mark Cavendish	Franco Pellizotti	Daniele Bennati	Emanuele Sella	Morris Possoni
5	Pavel Brutt	Franco Pellizotti	Daniele Bennati	Emanuele Sella	Morris Possoni
6	Matteo Priamo	Giovanni Visconti	Daniele Bennati	Emanuele Sella	Giovanni Visconti
7	Gabriele Bosisio	Giovanni Visconti	Daniele Bennati	Emanuele Sella	Giovanni Visconti
8	Riccardo Riccò	Giovanni Visconti	Riccardo Riccò	Emanuele Sella	Giovanni Visconti
9	Daniele Bennati	Giovanni Visconti	Daniele Bennati	Emanuele Sella	Giovanni Visconti
10	Marzio Bruseghin	Giovanni Visconti	Daniele Bennati	Emanuele Sella	Giovanni Visconti
11	Alessandro Bertolini	Giovanni Visconti	Daniele Bennati	Emanuele Sella	Giovanni Visconti
12	Daniele Bennati	Giovanni Visconti	Daniele Bennati	Emanuele Sella	Giovanni Visconti
13	Mark Cavendish	Giovanni Visconti	Daniele Bennati	Emanuele Sella	Giovanni Visconti
14	Emanuele Sella	Gabriele Bosisio	Daniele Bennati	Emanuele Sella	Riccardo Riccò
15	Emanuele Sella	Alberto Contador	Daniele Bennati	Emanuele Sella	Riccardo Riccò
16	Franco Pellizotti	Alberto Contador	Daniele Bennati	Emanuele Sella	Riccardo Riccò
17	André Greipel	Alberto Contador	Daniele Bennati	Emanuele Sella	Riccardo Riccò
18	Jens Voigt	Alberto Contador	Daniele Bennati	Emanuele Sella	Riccardo Riccò
19	Vasil Kiryienka	Alberto Contador	Daniele Bennati	Emanuele Sella	Riccardo Riccò
20	Emanuele Sella	Alberto Contador	Daniele Bennati	Emanuele Sella	Riccardo Riccò
21	Marco Pinotti	Alberto Contador	Daniele Bennati	Emanuele Sella	Riccardo Riccò
Final		Alberto Contador	Daniele Bennati	Emanuele Sella	Riccardo Riccò

== Final standings ==
Legend
A pink jersey	Denotes the winner of the General classification	A green jersey	Denotes the winner of the Mountains classification
A violet jersey	Denotes the winner of the Points classification	A white jersey	Denotes the winner of the Young rider classification

=== General classification ===
	Rider	Team	Time
1	Alberto Contador (ESP)	Astana	89h 56' 49"
2	Riccardo Riccò (ITA)	Saunier Duval–Scott	+ 1' 57"
3	Marzio Bruseghin (ITA)	Lampre	+ 2' 54"
4	Franco Pellizotti (ITA)	Liquigas	+ 2' 56"
5	Denis Menchov (RUS)	Rabobank	+ 3' 37"
6	Emanuele Sella (ITA)	CSF Group–Navigare	+ 4' 31"
7	Jurgen Van den Broeck (BEL)	Silence–Lotto	+ 6' 30"
8	Danilo Di Luca (ITA)	LPR Brakes–Ballan	+ 7' 15"
9	Domenico Pozzovivo (ITA)	CSF Group–Navigare	+ 7' 53"
10	Gilberto Simoni (ITA)	Diquigiovanni–Androni	+ 11' 03"

=== Mountains classification ===
	Rider	Team	Points
1	Emanuele Sella (ITA)	CSF Group–Navigare	136
2	Vasil Kiryienka (BLR)	Tinkoff Credit Systems	63
3	Fortunato Baliani (ITA)	CSF Group–Navigare	48
4	Julio Alberto Pérez (MEX)	CSF Group–Navigare	20
5	Alessandro Bertolini (ITA)	Diquigiovanni–Androni	20
6	Antonio Colom (ESP)	Astana	20
7	Alexander Efimkin (RUS)	Quick-Step	20
8	Gabriele Bosisio (ITA)	LPR Brakes–Ballan	19
9	Félix Cárdenas (COL)	Barloworld	19
10	José Rujano (VEN)	Caisse d'Epargne	18

=== Points classification ===
	Rider	Team	Points
1	Daniele Bennati (ITA)	Liquigas	189
2	Emanuele Sella (ITA)	CSF Group–Navigare	138
3	Riccardo Riccò (ITA)	Saunier Duval–Scott	131
4	Mark Cavendish (GBR)	Team High Road	106
5	Paolo Bettini (ITA)	Quick-Step	106
6	Franco Pellizotti (ITA)	Liquigas	96
7	Danilo Di Luca (ITA)	LPR Brakes–Ballan	87
8	Alberto Contador (ESP)	Astana	86
9	Erik Zabel (GER)	Team Milram	80
10	Vasil Kiryienka (BLR)	Tinkoff Credit Systems	76

=== Young rider classification ===
	Rider	Team	Time
1	Riccardo Riccò (ITA)	Saunier Duval–Scott	89h 58' 46"
2	Jurgen Van den Broeck (BEL)	Silence–Lotto	+ 4' 33"
3	Vincenzo Nibali (ITA)	Liquigas	+ 18' 17"
4	Chris Anker Sørensen (DEN)	Team CSC	+ 1h 02' 12"
5	Matthew Lloyd (AUS)	Silence–Lotto	+ 1h 03' 55"
6	Francis De Greef (BEL)	Silence–Lotto	+ 1h 19' 07"
7	Giovanni Visconti (ITA)	Quick-Step	+ 1h 28' 20"
8	Morris Possoni (ITA)	Team High Road	+ 1h 30' 36"
9	Simon Špilak (SLO)	Lampre	+ 1h 37' 49"
10	Johannes Fröhlinger (GER)	Gerolsteiner	+ 1h 39' 33"

=== Trofeo Fast Team classification ===
	Team	Time
1	CSF Group–Navigare	268h 52' 44"
2	Astana	+ 43' 48"
3	Liquigas	+ 1h 00' 42"
4	LPR Brakes–Ballan	+ 1h 06' 48"
5	Silence–Lotto	+ 1h 38' 13"
6	Diquigiovanni–Androni	+ 1h 53' 33"
7	Team CSC	+ 1h 57' 53"
8	Quick-Step	+ 2h 05' 32"
9	Caisse d'Epargne	+ 2h 14' 59"
10	Rabobank	+ 2h 22' 25"

=== Trofeo Super Team classification ===
	Team	Points
1	Liquigas	360
2	Astana	347
3	CSF Group–Navigare	340
4	LPR Brakes–Ballan	267
5	Team High Road	258
6	Tinkoff Credit Systems	237
7	Saunier Duval–Scott	223
8	Quick-Step	198
9	Caisse d'Epargne	188
10	Lampre	187

=== Minor classifications ===
Other less well-known classifications were awarded during the Giro, whose leaders did not receive a special jersey. These awards were based on points earned throughout the three weeks of the tour. Each mass start stage had one intermediate sprint, awarding points to the Expo Milano 2015 classification. These sprints gave bonus seconds towards the general classification, points towards the regular points classification, and also points towards the Expo Milano 2015 classification. This award was known in previous years as the Intergiro, and was previously time-based, awarding a blue jersey. CSF Group–Navigare rider Fortunato Baliani won this classification.

Additional minor classifications included the combativity classification, which was a compilation of points gained for position on crossing intermediate sprints, mountain passes and stage finishes. Mountains classification winner Emanuele Sella took this award. The Azzurri d'Italia classification was based on finishing order, but points were only awarded to the top three finishers in each stage. Like the overall points classification, it was Liquigas' Daniele Bennati who won this. Also, the Trofeo Fuga Cervelo rewarded riders who took part in a breakaway at the head of the field, each rider in an escape of ten or fewer riders getting one point for each kilometre that the group stays clear. Along with the Expo Milano 2015, Fortunato Baliani also finished first in this classification. Additionally, teams were on occasion given penalty points for technical infringements. Lampre avoided any penalties, and so was the winner of the Fair Play classification.
