= Matteo Priamo =

Italian cyclist

Personal information
- Full name: Matteo Priamo
- Born: 20 March 1982 (age 44) Castelfranco Veneto, Italy

Cycling career
- Sport: Cycling
- Current team: Suspended
- Discipline: Road
- Role: Rider

Professional team
- 2006–2008: Ceramica Panaria–Navigare

Major wins
- Giro d'Italia, 1 stage (2008)

Matteo Priamo (born 20 March 1982 in Castelfranco Veneto) is an Italian professional road bicycle racer, previously of UCI Professional Continental team CSF Group–Navigare.

Priamo's CSF Group–Navigare teammate Emanuele Sella, who had won three stages and the mountains classification at the 2008 Giro d'Italia, tested positive for methoxy polyethylene glycol-epoetin beta (better known as Mircera, an erythropoietin derivative) at an out-of-competition control run by the UCI. After confessing to his doping he named Priamo as his supplier. Though the Italian National Anti-Doping tribunal originally exonerated Priamo, the Court of Arbitration for Sport ruled, upon appeal by the Italian National Olympic Committee, that he should be suspended for four years.

== Palmarès ==
2004
5th Gran Premio della Liberazione
2005
1st GP di Poggiana
1st Trofeo G. Bianchin
1st GP Citta' di Felino
2nd Trofeo Zsšdi
3rd Gran Premio San Giuseppe
2007
1st Stage 2 Circuit de Lorraine
2nd Giro di Toscana
5th Time trial, National Road Championships
2008
1st Stage 6 Giro d'Italia
Presidential Cycling Tour of Turkey
1st Stage 3 & 5
