= Continuous erythropoietin receptor activator =

Class of drugs

Continuous erythropoietin receptor activator (CERA) is the generic term for drugs in a new class of third-generation erythropoiesis-stimulating agents (ESAs). In the media, these agents are commonly referred to as 'EPO', short for erythropoietin. CERAs have an extended half-life and a mechanism of action that promotes increased stimulation of erythropoietin receptors compared with other ESAs.

Under the trade name Mircera, Roche Pharmaceuticals received approval from the U.S. Food and Drug Administration (FDA) in January 2008 to market a continuous erythropoiesis receptor activator (methoxy polyethylene glycol-epoetin beta) for the treatment of anemia in patients with chronic kidney disease, including in those undergoing dialysis. This issue appears to have been resolved since Fresenius Medical dialysis clinics in the US are now administering this drug.) Methoxy polyethylene glycol-epoetin beta had been approved by the European Commission in August 2007, and was made available in Europe at the start of 2008.

In terms of its structure, Mircera is similar to the previous synthetic EPO drugs, except that it is connected to a chemical called polyethylene glycol (PEG), which makes it last longer in the body. According to Roche, the product has the longest half-life of all FDA-approved erythropoiesis-stimulating agents (ESAs): up to 6 times longer than darbepoetin alfa and up to 20 times longer than epoetin. CERAs thus promise both lower dosing—significant owing to the high inherent cost of manufacturing recombinant protein drugs—and less frequent injections for patients. ESAs are administered via subcutaneous injections, often in doctor's offices for patients who lack the skill or dexterity to inject themselves, so the once- or twice-monthly dosing regimen for CERAs promises fewer costly, inconvenient office visits for patients requiring constant hemoglobin level maintenance for chronic kidney disease.

In clinical trials, CERA dosed every 3 to 4 weeks demonstrated efficacy similar to that of epoetin alfa and darbepoetin alfa in maintaining hemoglobin concentrations within the target hemoglobin range. CERA has generally been well tolerated in clinical trials.

== Illegal use in sports ==
Like all previous generations of EPO, the drug has made its appearance as a doping agent in endurance sport. It was rumoured to be blocked from the kidneys due to its size and therefore undetectable by urine-based doping controls. However, professional cyclist Riccardo Riccò returned a positive A-sample test for Mircera in the 2008 Tour de France and was ejected from the race by his team and arrested by French police. In September 2008, it was reported that samples of around 30 tour riders would be re-tested using a new, more effective test for CERA and in October 2008, two-time stage winner Stefan Schumacher, third overall and polka-dot jersey winner Bernhard Kohl, and Leonardo Piepoli tested positive for CERA.

Six weeks after the end of the 2008 Olympic Games, the International Olympic Committee (IOC) announced it would be retesting all doping samples from the 2008 Beijing Olympics for CERA. The IOC announced in April 2009 that cyclist Davide Rebellin had tested positive for CERA use.

In July 2009, the Union Cycliste Internationale announced that Danilo Di Luca, who had finished second in the 2009 Giro d'Italia had samples from two stages test positive.

In the August 2009 issue of the scientific journal Comparative Exercise Physiology, Don Catlin, M.D. and colleagues at the Los Angeles-based NGO Anti-Doping Research (ADR) reported that they developed an equine test for CERA.

In November 2009, the Olympic 1500 m champion Rashid Ramzi was stripped of his title by the IOC after testing positive for CERA.

In July 2010, athlete Erik Tysse gave a positive CERA sample and was later banned for two years by the IAAF.
