= Morris Possoni =

Italian cyclist

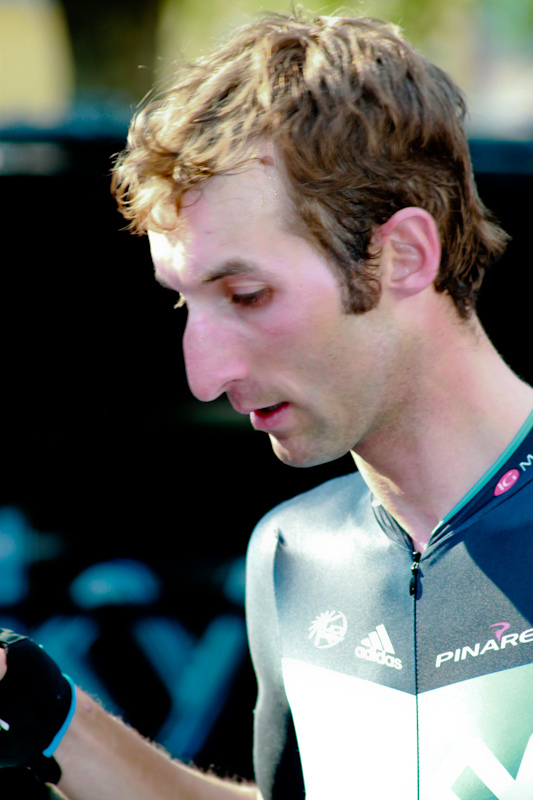
- Possoni at the 2011 Tour de Romandie.

Personal information
- Full name: Morris Possoni
- Born: 1 July 1984 (age 42) Ponte San Pietro, Italy
- Height: 1.73 m (5 ft 8 in)
- Weight: 56 kg (123 lb)

Cycling career
- Sport: Cycling
- Discipline: Road
- Role: Rider

Professional teams
- 2006–2007: Lampre–Fondital
- 2008–2009: Team High Road
- 2010–2011: Team Sky
- 2012: Lampre–ISD

Morris Possoni (born 1 July 1984) is an Italian former road bicycle racer, who competed as a professional from 2006 to 2012.

In 2008, Possoni rode for Team High Road. His best moment was in the 2008 Giro d'Italia, where he wore the white jersey as leader of the young rider classification. In 2010, Possoni transferred to Team Sky. His future ambition is to reach the podium in a Grand Tour.

After two years at Team Sky, Possoni returned to Lampre–ISD for the 2012 season.

== Major results ==
2004
3rd Overall Giro della Valle d'Aosta
2005
1st Overall Giro della Valle d'Aosta

1st Stage 1

2008
9th Giro di Lombardia
2009
6th Trofeo Inca
7th Overall Settimana internazionale di Coppi e Bartali
1st Stage 3 (TTT) Tour de Romandie
1st Stage 1 (TTT) Giro d'Italia
2010
7th Gran Premio dell'Insubria-Lugano
8th Overall Tour of Austria
2nd Overall Brixia Tour
5th Overall Vuelta a Burgos
2011
5th Overall Tour Méditerranéen
7th Overall Tour of Austria
6th Overall Brixia Tour

=== Grand Tour general classification results timeline ===
Grand Tour	2007	2008	2009	2010	2011	2012
Giro d'Italia	—	44	79	DNF	79	—
Tour de France	—	—	—	—	—	—
/ Vuelta a España	88	—	—	—	79	DNF

Legend
—	Did not compete
DNF	Did not finish
