= Gabriele Bosisio =

Italian cyclist

Personal information
- Full name: Gabriele Bosisio
- Born: 6 August 1980 (age 46) Lecco, Italy

Cycling career
- Sport: Cycling
- Discipline: Road
- Role: Rider

Professional teams
- 2003–2007: Tenax
- 2008–2009: LPR Brakes–Ballan
- 2012–2013: Utensilnord–Named

Major wins
- Grand Tours Giro d'Italia 1 stage (2008) One-day races and Classics Giro del Lazio (2007)

Gabriele Bosisio (born 6 August 1980 in Lecco) is a retired Italian professional road bicycle racer. Bosisio rode for Tenax–Nobili Rubinetterie between 2003 and 2005 and for UCI Professional Continental team LPR Brakes–Ballan in 2008 and 2009.

On 6 October 2009 it was announced that he had failed a drugs test. On 28 April 2010, it was announced that he would be suspended from professional cycling for 2 years. He was provisionally suspended by the UCI on 6 October, and his ban ended on 5 October 2011. After completing his ban, Bosisio signed with Utensilnord–Named for the 2012 season.

== Major results ==
2005
7th GP Industria Artigianato e Commercio Carnaghese
8th Overall Bayern-Rundfahrt
2006
8th Milano–Torino
9th GP Costa degli Etruschi
10th Trofeo Laigueglia
10th Trofeo Città di Castelfidardo
2007
1st Giro del Lazio
1st Stage 1 Test Event Beijing 2008
2nd GP Città di Camaiore
4th Overall Circuit de Lorraine
5th GP Nobili Rubinetterie
6th GP Chiasso
7th Giro dell'Appennino
8th Milano–Torino
2008
Giro d'Italia

1st Stage 7
Held after Stage 14

1st Stage 3 Brixia Tour
1st Giro d'Oro
2nd GP Nobili Rubinetterie
5th Overall Tour of Britain
7th Giro del Veneto
2009
1st Stage 1 (TTT)Settimana Ciclistica Lombarda
2nd Time trial, National Road Championships
2nd GP Industria & Artigianato Larciano
5th GP Nobili Rubinetterie
9th Giro di Toscana
2012
5th Coppa Placci
8th Coppa Agostoni
10th GP Industria e Commercio Artigianato Carnaghese
