= 2008 Tour of Turkey =

Race details
- Stages: 7 & prologue
- Distance: 1,071.8 km (666.0 mi)
- Winning time: 25h 40' 41"

Results
	Winner	David García (ESP)	(Karpin–Galicia)
	Second	José Alberto Benítez (ESP)	(Saunier Duval–Scott)
	Third	Pieter Jacobs (BEL)	(Silence–Lotto)
	Points	Assan Bazayev (KAZ)	(Astana)
	Mountains	José Alberto Benítez (ESP)	(Saunier Duval–Scott)
	Team	Diquigiovanni–Androni	

The 2008 Presidential Cycling Tour of Turkey, the 44th running of the race, took place from April 13 to April 20, 2008.

== Stages ==
Stage	Route	Distance		Type	Date	Stage winner
Stage	Route	km	mi	Type	Date	Stage winner
P	Grand Prix of Istanbul	76.2	47.3	Opening race	Sunday, April 13	Grégory Rast (SUI)
1	İzmir–Kuşadası	132.7	82.5	Flat stage	Monday, April 14	Alessandro Petacchi (ITA)
2	Kuşadası–Bodrum	165.9	103.1	Flat stage	Tuesday, April 15	Mirco Lorenzetto (ITA)
3	Bodrum–Marmaris	166.8	103.6	Flat stage	Wednesday, April 16	Matteo Priamo (ITA)
4	Marmaris–Ölüdeniz	177.7	110.4	Flat stage	Thursday, April 17	Filippo Savini (ITA)
5	Kalkan–Finike	100.1	62.2	Flat stage	Friday, April 18	Matteo Priamo (ITA)
6	Finike–Antalya	115.8	72.0	Flat stage	Saturday, April 19	Alessandro Petacchi (ITA)
7	Antalya–Alanya	136.6	84.9	Flat stage	Sunday, April 20	Maximiliano Richeze (ARG)

== Teams ==
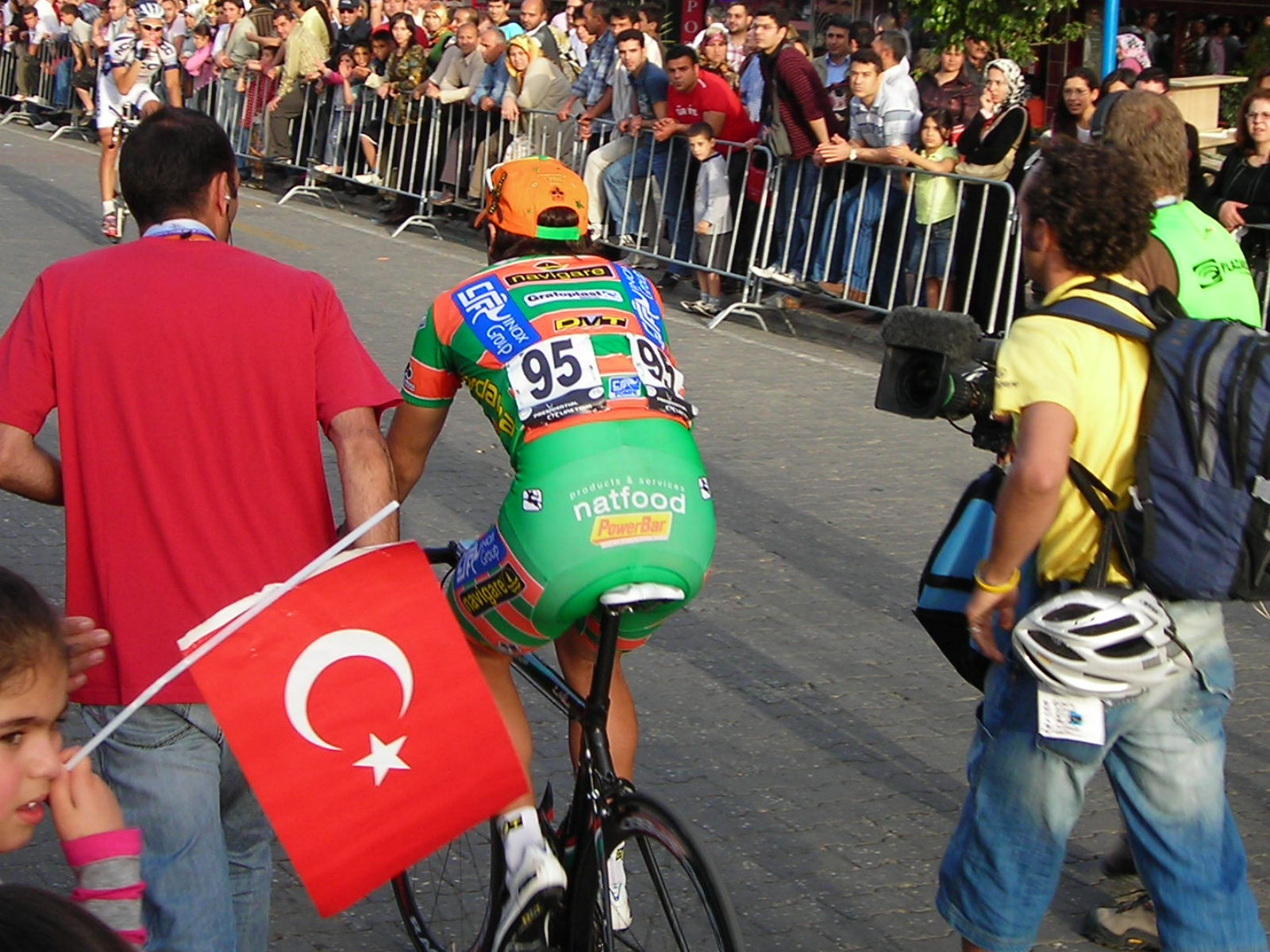
Winner of Antalya–Alanya stage Maximiliano Richezefrom Argentina

25 teams started the race – each had 6 riders at the start of the tour i.e., 150 started in total. The teams were:

- Pro Teams
  - Silence–Lotto
  - Saunier Duval–Scott
  - Team Milram
  - Lampre
  - Astana
- Pro-Continental teams
  - PSK Whirlpool–Author
  - Mitsubishi–Jartazi
  - CSF Group–Navigare
  - Benfica
  - Extremadura
  - Karpin–Galicia
  - NGC Medical–OTC Industria Porte
  - Serramenti PVC Diquigiovanni–Androni Giocattoli
- Continental teams
  - Tyrol–Team Radland Tirol
  - AC Sparta Praha
  - Team Ista
  - Cosmote Kastro
  - Centri della Calzatura Partizan
  - Hadimec AG
  - Atlas–Romer's Hausbäckerei
  - Steg Computer–CKT Cogeas
  - Brisa Cycling Team
- National teams
  - (Turkey) Turkish national team
  - (Netherlands) Dutch national team
  - (Republic of Ireland) Irish national team
