= Emanuele Sella =

Italian cyclist (born 1981)

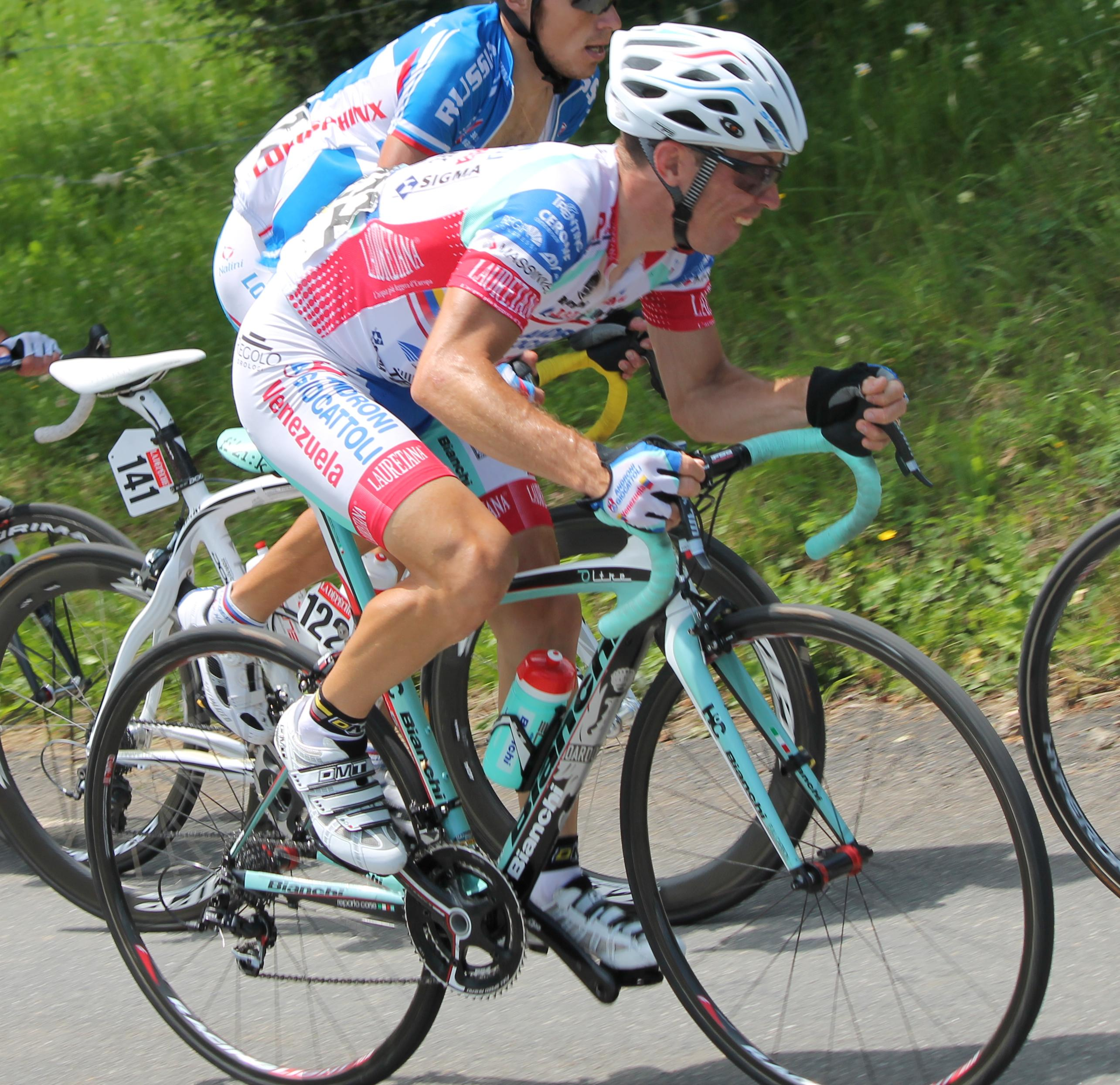
- Sella at the 2012 Route du Sud

Personal information
- Full name: Emanuele Sella
- Born: 9 January 1981 (age 45) Vicenza, Italy
- Height: 1.65 m (5 ft 5 in)
- Weight: 54 kg (119 lb)

Cycling career
- Sport: Cycling
- Discipline: Road
- Role: Rider
- Rider type: Climber

Professional teams
- 2004–2008: Ceramica Panaria–Margres
- 2009–2010: Carmiooro A Style
- 2011–2015: Androni Giocattoli

Major wins
- Grand Tours Giro d'Italia Mountains classification (2008) 4 individual stages (2004, 2008)

Emanuele Sella (born 9 January 1981) is an Italian former road racing cyclist, who competed professionally between 2004 and 2015 for the CSF Group–Navigare, Carmiooro NGC and Androni Giocattoli–Sidermec teams.

== Doping ==
In out-of-competition control testing, on 23 July 2008, Vicenza-born Sella was found to test positive for CERA, the third-generation EPO according to La Gazzetta dello Sport. Sella confirmed that he had used EPO when he was called to testify in front of the Italian National Olympic Committee (CONI) on 8 August 2008. This resulted in his suspension for a year, starting 19 August 2008.

== Major results ==
2001
10th Trofeo Alcide De Gasperi
2002
3rd Road race, National Under-23 Road Championships
5th Trofeo Alcide De Gasperi
6th Giro del Belvedere
2003
1st Trofeo Alcide De Gasperi
2nd Trofeo Città di San Vendemiano
3rd Gran Premio Palio del Recioto
5th Giro del Belvedere
8th Gran Premio San Giuseppe
9th Road race, UEC European Under-23 Road Championships
9th Overall Giro delle Regioni
2004
1st Trofeo Città di Castelfidardo
1st Stage 11 Giro d'Italia
7th Overall Giro della Provincia di Lucca
9th Gran Premio Nobili Rubinetterie
10th Giro del Medio Brenta
2005
1st Overall Brixia Tour

1st Points classification
1st Stage 2b (ITT)

3rd Gran Premio di Lugano
4th Milano–Torino
7th Giro d'Oro
9th Gran Premio Fred Mengoni
10th Overall Giro d'Italia
2006
2nd Coppa Placci
3rd Giro del Lazio
4th Overall Brixia Tour
5th Overall Giro del Trentino
6th Giro dell'Appennino
10th Overall Vuelta a Murcia
2007
1st Stage 2b Brixia Tour
2nd Giro del Lazio
4th Gran Premio Città di Camaiore
5th Giro d'Oro
8th Giro dell'Appennino
9th Overall Volta a la Comunitat Valenciana
2008
5th Overall Settimana Internazionale di Coppi e Bartali

1st Stage 5

6th Overall Giro d'Italia

1st Mountains classification
1st Stages 14, 15 & 20

7th Overall Giro del Trentino

1st Mountains classification

8th Overall Giro della Provincia di Reggio Calabria
2009
3rd Overall Cinturó de l'Empordà

1st Stage 3

10th Overall Tour du Gévaudan Languedoc-Roussillon
2010
2nd Grand Prix of Aargau Canton
3rd Overall Tour of Austria
5th Road race, National Road Championships
7th Les Boucles du Sud-Ardèche
9th Overall Settimana Ciclistica Lombarda
2011
1st Overall Settimana Internazionale di Coppi e Bartali

1st Stages 1b (TTT) & 3

2nd Giro dell'Appennino
2nd Classica Sarda Sassari-Cagliari
3rd Overall Tour de Langkawi
4th Giro di Toscana
5th Overall Giro di Sardegna
6th Overall Giro di Padania
9th Coppa Sabatini
9th GP Industria & Artigianato di Larciano
10th Overall Brixia Tour
10th Grand Prix of Aargau Canton
2012
1st Coppa Agostoni
1st Gran Premio Industria e Commercio di Prato
3rd Giro del Veneto – Coppa Placci
6th Overall Giro di Padania
5th Gran Premio Città di Camaiore
8th Grand Prix of Aargau Canton
9th Gran Premio Industria e Commercio Artigianato Carnaghese
10th Prueba Villafranca de Ordizia
2013
1st Mountains classification, Route du Sud
10th Giro dell'Emilia

=== Grand Tour general classification results timeline ===
| Grand Tour | 2004 | 2005 | 2006 | 2007 | 2008 | 2009 | 2010 | 2011 | 2012 | 2013 | 2014 | 2015 |
|---|---|---|---|---|---|---|---|---|---|---|---|---|
| Giro d'Italia | 12 | 10 | 26 | 11 | 6 | — | — | 35 | 45 | 58 | 63 | — |
| Tour de France | Did not contest during career | | | | | | | | | | | |
| / Vuelta a España | Did not contest during career | | | | | | | | | | | |

Legend
| — | Did not compete |
| DNF | Did not finish |
