= Mirco Lorenzetto =

Italian cyclist (born 1981)

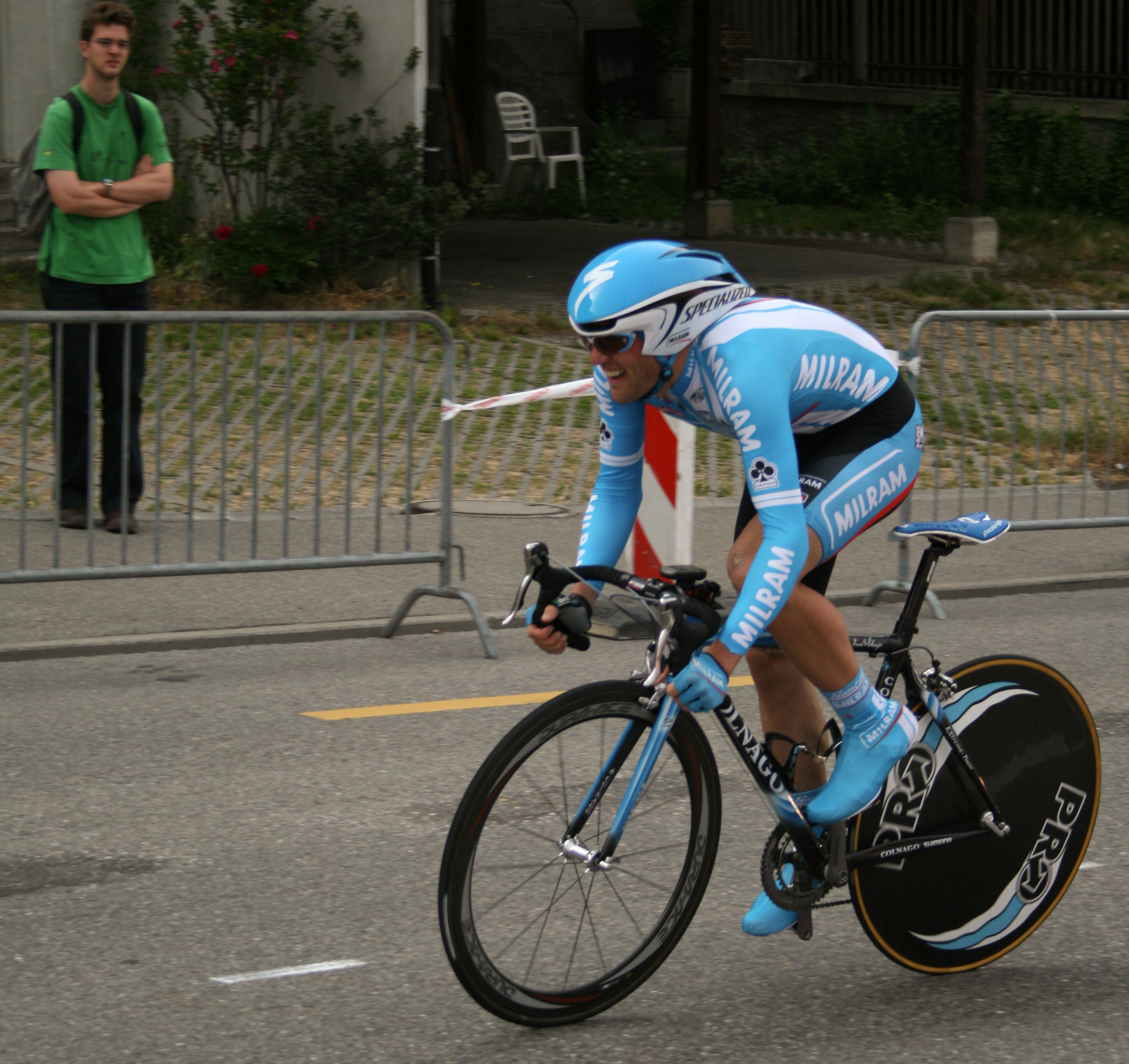

Personal information
- Full name: Mirco Lorenzetto
- Born: 13 July 1981 (age 45) Vittorio Veneto, Italy

Cycling career
- Sport: Cycling
- Current team: Vega–Vitalcare–Dynatek
- Disciplines: Road; Track
- Role: Rider (retired); Directeur sportif

Professional teams
- 2004–2005: De Nardi
- 2006–2007: Team Milram
- 2008–2010: Lampre
- 2011: Astana

Managerial teams
- 2019: Team Colpack
- 2020: Beltrami TSA–Marchiol
- 2021–: Work Service–Marchiol–Vega

Mirco Lorenzetto (born 13 July 1981 in Vittorio Veneto) is an Italian former racing cyclist, who competed as a professional between 2004 and 2011. During his career, Lorenzetto took victories in the 2007 Tour Méditerranéen, the 2009 Giro di Sardegna, and the 2009 Giro del Friuli. He now works as a directeur sportif for UCI Continental team Vega–Vitalcare–Dynatek.

== Career ==
Lorenzetto became a professional cyclist in 2004. His first victory came in 2007, when he won a stage in the Tour Méditerranéen, in a close sprint over Daniele Bennati.

The year 2009 started good for Lorenzetto, as in March he already had three victories. In April 2009, during the Tour of Flanders, Lorenzetto crashed and was taken to hospital, but a few days later he could leave the hospital without serious damage.

Lorenzetto announced his retirement in December 2011, at the age of 30.

== Major results ==
2002
1st Trofeo PIVA
3rd Trofeo Franco Balestra
9th Circuito del Porto
2003
4th Trofeo PIVA
6th Poreč Trophy
10th Gran Premio della Liberazione
2004
8th Giro della Provincia di Reggio Calabria
9th Coppa Bernocchi
2005
7th Giro della Provincia di Lucca
2006
7th GP Citta' di Misano Adriatico
2007
1st Stage 6 Tour Méditerranéen
2nd Trofeo Laigueglia
7th Overall Settimana Internazionale di Coppi e Bartali
2008
1st Stage 2 Presidential Cycling Tour of Turkey
1st Stage 4 Volta a la Comunitat Valenciana
5th Milan–San Remo
5th Trofeo Laigueglia
7th Overall Tour de Pologne
8th Vattenfall Cyclassics
2009
Giro di Sardegna

1st Stages 1 & 2

1st Giro del Friuli
2010
1st Stage 4 Tour de Pologne
