= Matthias Russ =

German cyclist

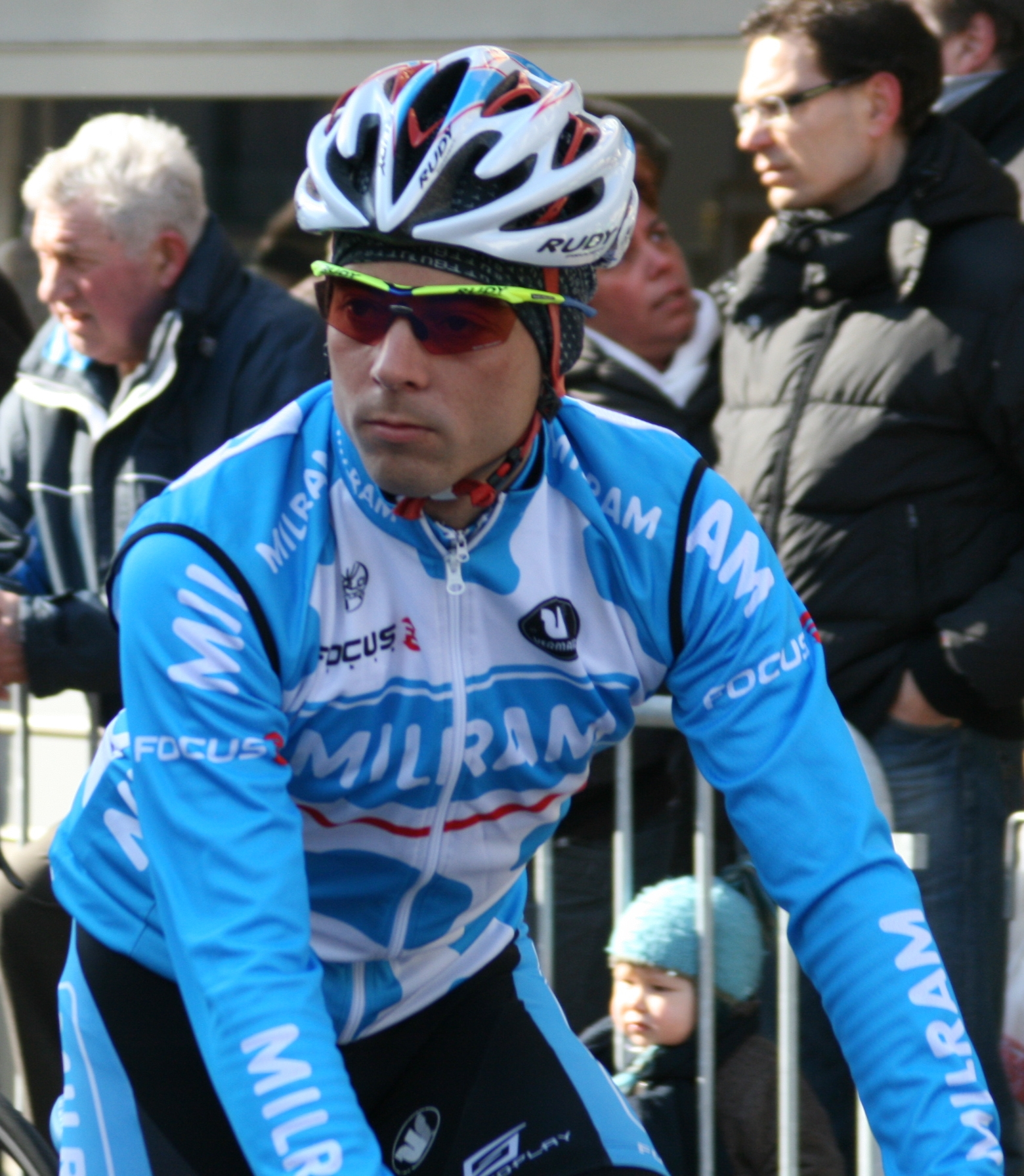

Personal information
- Full name: Matthias Russ
- Born: November 14, 1983 (age 42) Reutlingen, Germany
- Height: 1.75 m (5 ft 9 in)
- Weight: 62 kg (137 lb)

Cycling career
- Sport: Cycling
- Current team: Unattached
- Discipline: Road
- Role: Rider

Professional teams
- 2005–2008: Gerolsteiner
- 2009–2010: Team Milram

Matthias Russ (born November 14, 1983, in Reutlingen) is a German professional road bicycle racer, currently unattached following the collapse of Team Milram.

== Palmares ==
- Regio-Tour – 1 stage & Best Young Rider (2006)
- 3rd, National U23 Road Race Championship (2003)
