= Riccardo Riccò =

Italian cyclist

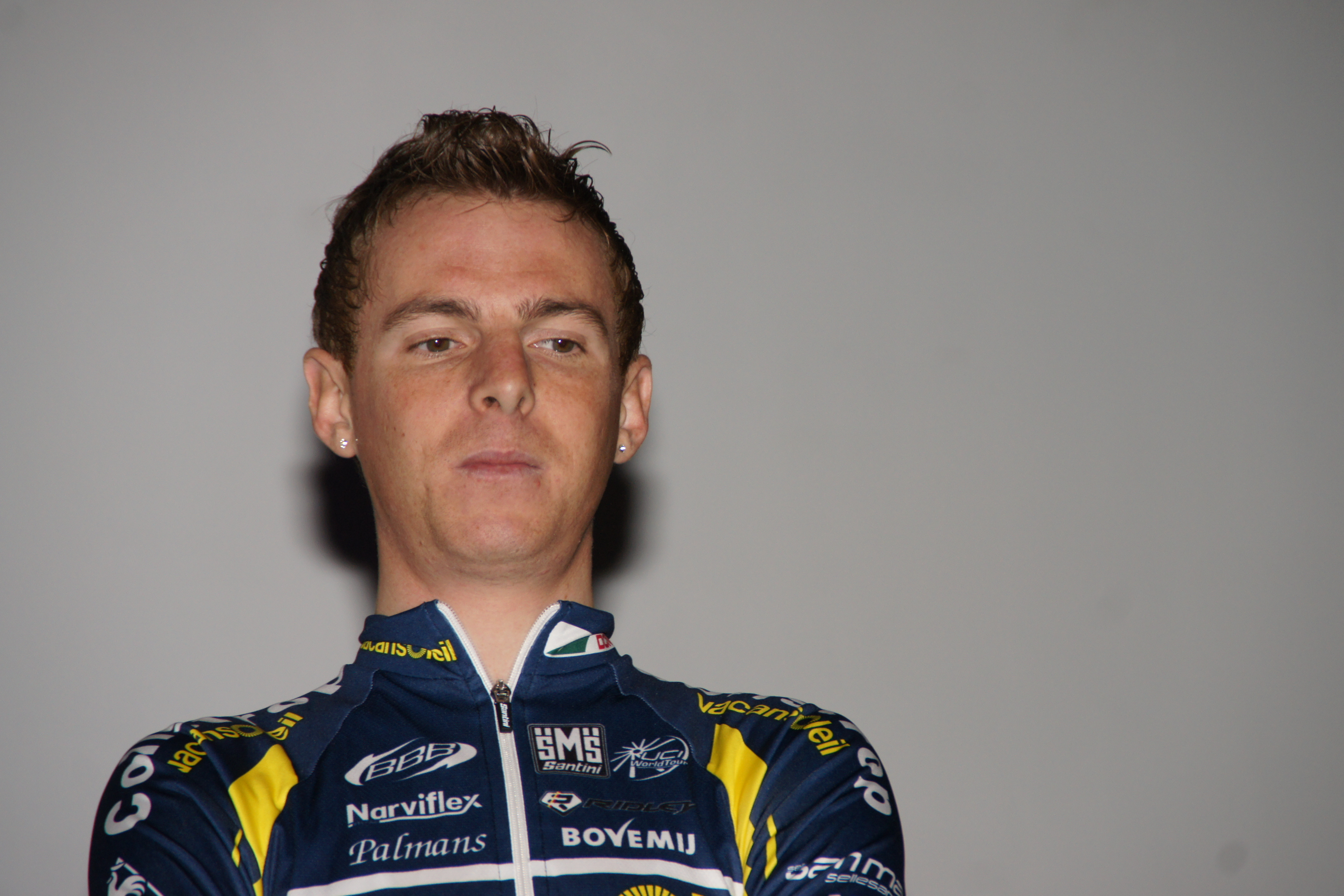
- Riccò in 2011

Personal information
- Full name: Riccardo Riccò
- Nickname: The Cobra
- Born: 1 September 1983 (age 43) Formigine, Italy
- Height: 1.73 m (5 ft 8 in)
- Weight: 59 kg (130 lb)

Cycling career
- Sport: Cycling
- Current team: Suspended
- Discipline: Road
- Role: Rider
- Rider type: Climber

Professional teams
- 2006–2008: Saunier Duval–Prodir
- 2010: Ceramica Flaminia
- 2010–2011: Vacansoleil
- 2011–2012: Meridiana–Kamen

Major wins
- Grand Tours Giro d'Italia Young rider classification (2008) 3 individual stages (2007, 2008)

Riccardo Riccò (born 1 September 1983) is an Italian professional road bicycle racer, who was suspended from all competition until 2024. He was previously ejected from the 2008 Tour de France for doping violations and suspended. Riccò returned to competition in late 2010, but in February 2011 he was fired by his team, Vacansoleil–DCM, after he became seriously ill allegedly through a self-administered autologous blood transfusion. He then signed to UCI Continental team Meridiana–Kamen.

On 19 April 2012 it was announced that he had been suspended for 12 years. He was subsequently banned for life in December 2020, spanning from an investigation started in 2015.

== Career ==
Born in Formigine, Riccò joined UCI ProTeam Saunier Duval–Prodir in 2006 after two successful seasons as an amateur rider, during which he won the Settimana Bergamasca. Prior to joining the team he tried to become a professional with Ceramica Panaria–Navigare in 2005 but was not allowed because several blood tests revealed his hematocrit levels exceeded those acceptable. Saunier Duval's sportif director, Mauro Gianetti, suggested he spend a week in the UCI laboratory in Lausanne to prove that his blood values were natural. Further exhaustive tests by the UCI confirmed that Riccò's hematocrit level was naturally over 50%. This has since been questioned however when, on 17 July 2008, it was revealed that Riccò had a non negative test for EPO, the hematocrit boosting drug, following the Tour de France stage 4 time trial at Cholet. It has since been suggested by fellow professional rider Jérôme Pineau that Riccò openly doped even as a junior rider.

=== Saunier Duval (2006–2008) ===
Riccò's breakthrough came during the 2007 Tirreno–Adriatico, when he won two consecutive stages and the points classification. He also won a stage and finished second in Settimana internazionale di Coppi e Bartali. He then finished ninth in Amstel Gold Race and sixth in La Flèche Wallonne in his first ever appearance in the Ardennes Classics. He rode the Giro d'Italia as a domestique of team leader Gilberto Simoni and in the process he took the 15th stage at Tre Cime di Lavaredo ahead of his teammate Leonardo Piepoli. He would finish sixth overall, seven minutes behind eventual winner Danilo Di Luca. In the season finale Giro di Lombardia, he finished second after losing a two-man sprint with Damiano Cunego.

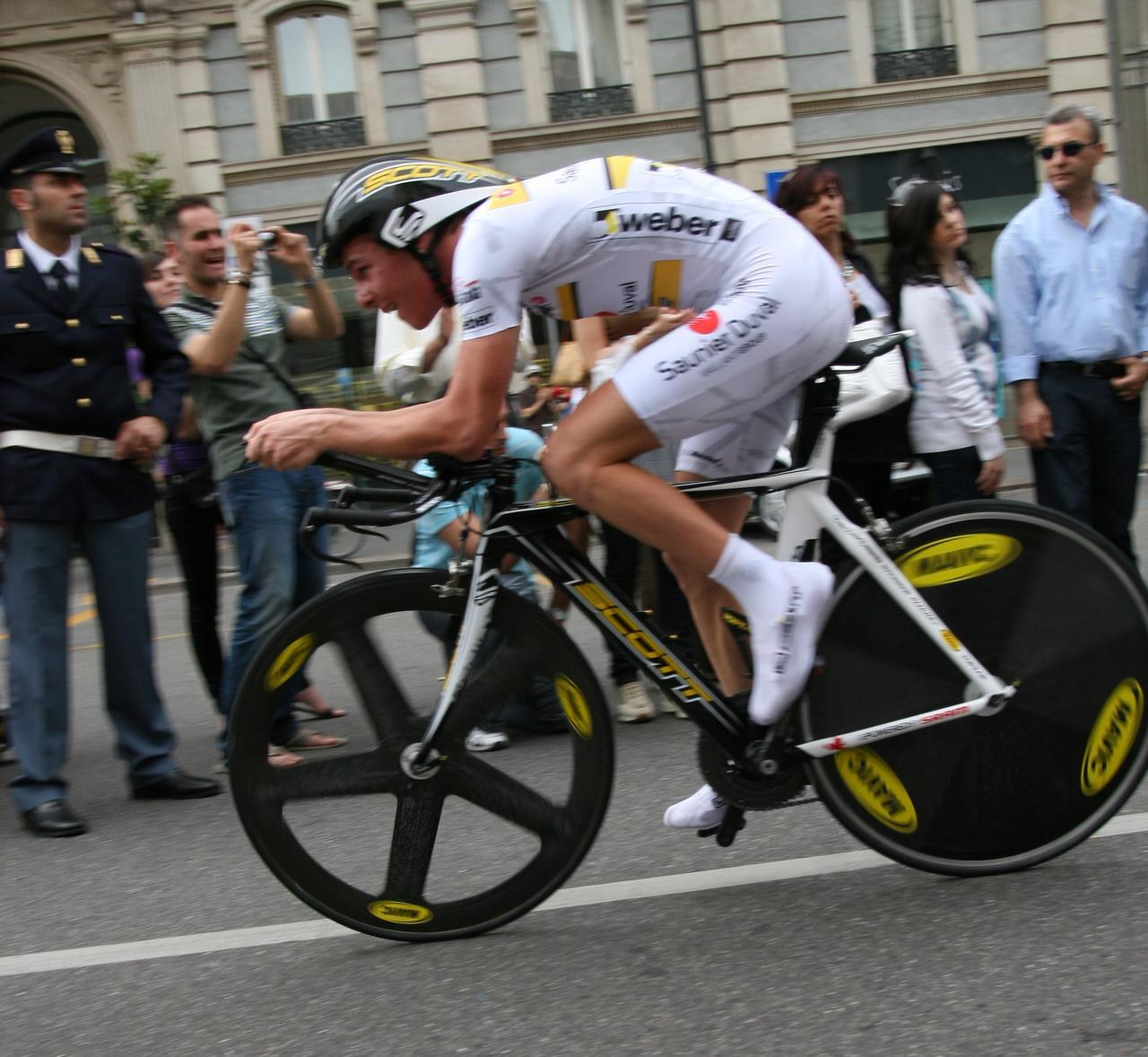
Ricco during the 2008 Giro d'Italia, wearing the white jersey as leader of the young rider classification

In 2008, Riccò rode the Giro d'Italia as team leader, and impressed in the mountains, taking two stage victories, the young rider's classification, and was 2nd overall in the general classification, 1:57 behind winner Alberto Contador. It was suspected that Riccò's performance was not clean. Doping expert Michel Audran has stated that CERA was in use by some riders in the 2008 Giro CERA is the supposedly untraceable third generation EPO used by Riccò in the Tour de France weeks later.

On 10 July 2008, Riccò won stage 6 of the Tour de France with a hilltop finish at Super-Besse giving him his first Tour de France stage win. There were, however, some rumors saying that test results revealed abnormalities in his blood level. The team and the athlete claimed there were no doping issues, however, since Riccò claims to have a naturally high haematocrit level. He reportedly has a UCI certificate attesting to an hematocrit of 51%, 50% being considered the accepted upper limit since 1997. Three days later he achieved his second win at stage 9 of the Tour de France with a break away climb of the Col d'Aspin.

== Doping ==
=== 2008 Tour de France ===
On 17 July 2008, Riccò tested positive for the banned blood booster Continuous Erythropoiesis Receptor Activator (or CERA, a variant of Erythropoietin), from a sample taken following the fourth stage, making him the third rider to test positive for this substance in the 2008 Tour de France after Moisés Dueñas of Barloworld and Manuel Beltrán of Liquigas. He was immediately ejected from the Tour and his team Saunier Duval withdrew of their own volition. Saunier Duval announced the next day that team manager Mauro Gianetti had "lost faith in" Riccò and that he had been fired from the team; Riccò spent the night at the police station and was indicted on charges of "use of poisonous substances". He denied the charges and told RAI television;

I'm very bitter. I spent a night in the police station and it was like being in prison. The magistrate listened to what I had to say. They searched my bags but only found some vitamins that we all use and so they decided to let me go home.

The prosecutor, Antoine Leroy, testified that medical supplies including syringes and equipment for intravenous drips were found in his hotel room, but were unused. According to AFP, the prosecutor said in the first searches, "there were no doping substances as such" found.

It was later revealed that Riccò had attempted to escape doping control officials after stage 4 of the Tour, but had been caught in traffic. As a result of this, officials decided that he was to be tested after every stage. It was also revealed that CERA's manufacturer Roche Pharmaceuticals had secretly worked closely with the World Anti-Doping Agency to develop a test for the drug, and this was how Riccò had been caught.

In the week following the race, Riccò admitted to the Italian National Olympic Committee (CONI) that, independent of the team, he had been taking EPO in preparation for the 2008 Tour de France, and he accepted responsibility for his actions and apologized to his teammates and fans. Riccò told the Italian newspaper La Repubblica that it was the banned doping doctor Carlo Santuccione who supplied the new form of EPO.

Following Riccò's admission of guilt in the affair, his advisors had hoped for a 20-month ban to be handed to the rider, but on 2 October 2008, he was handed a 2-year ban by the Italian National Olympic Committee (CONI), which Riccò found disappointing; "I'm very disappointed and bitter. I expected better understanding. But I made a mistake and it's fair that I pay." However, on 17 March 2009, the Court of Arbitration for Sport reduced the ban to 20 months because of his cooperation; he resumed racing in March 2010 on the Ceramica Flaminia team.

Riccò also faced criminal prosecution in both Italy and France for the doping affair. He was convicted by a criminal court in Padua and given a fine of €3,040. In June 2010, Riccò was handed a two-year suspended sentence by a Toulouse court, which was upheld on appeal in November 2011.

In August 2010, Riccò terminated his contract for Ceramica Flaminia, and signed a two-year contract with Dutch Vacansoleil Pro Cycling Team.

=== 2011 blood transfusion incident ===
On 6 February 2011 Riccò was admitted to a hospital in critical condition, with sepsis and kidney failure, allegedly due to a blood transfusion he performed on himself with 25-day-old blood. Riccò admitted to the doctor treating him that he had performed the transfusion in the presence of his girlfriend Vania Rossi. The doctor reported this information to authorities leading to an investigation being opened against the professional cyclist by police and the Italian Olympic committee (CONI). Riccò was released from the hospital within two weeks, and was subsequently sacked by his team Vacansoleil–DCM. Riccò later denied blood doping, but also stated that he was finished with the sport and that he wanted to train to become a barista. He later changed his mind and said he would indeed like to race again.

In October 2011, it was reported that Riccò confessed to the blood transfusion to CONI although his lawyer later denied these reports.

On 19 April 2012, Italy's National Anti-doping Court (TNA – Tribunale Nazionale Antidoping) banned Riccò from any professional cycling activity for 12 years, effectively ending his career. An appeal by Riccò was dismissed by the Court of Arbitration for Sport.

=== 2014 accusations ===
On 1 May 2014 Riccò was accused of purchasing EPO and testosterone, after being caught by Italian police in the car park of a McDonald's restaurant in Livorno. Riccò later claimed to be "in the wrong place at the wrong time" and his lawyer stated that he was not in the car park to purchase EPO. In 2020 after an investigation, anti-doping body Nado Italia amended Riccò's suspension to a lifetime ban.

== Major results ==
2001
8th Overall Giro della Lunigiana
2002
7th Road race, UCI Under-23 Road World Championships
2003
1st Coppa della Pace
8th Overall Giro Ciclistico d'Italia

1st Stage 2

2004
1st Road race, National Under-23 Road Championships
4th Gran Premio Industrie del Marmo
5th Overall Giro Ciclistico d'Italia
2005
1st Overall Settimana Ciclistica Lombarda

1st Points classification
1st Young rider classification
1st Stages 2 & 3

2nd Gran Premio della Liberazione
3rd Gran Premio Palio del Recioto
6th GP Capodarco
7th Overall Giro della Toscana

1st Stage 4

2006
1st Japan Cup
Settimana internazionale di Coppi e Bartali

1st Points classification
1st Stage 5

3rd Gran Premio Bruno Beghelli
5th Giro dell'Emilia
8th Coppa Placci
9th Coppa Sabatini
2007
Tirreno–Adriatico

1st Points classification
1st Stages 3 & 4

2nd Overall Settimana internazionale di Coppi e Bartali

1st Stage 5

2nd Giro di Lombardia
4th Giro dell'Emilia
5th La Flèche Wallonne
5th Gran Premio Bruno Beghelli
6th Overall Giro d'Italia

1st Stage 15

9th Overall Tour de San Luis

1st Stage 4

9th Amstel Gold Race
2008
2nd Overall Giro d'Italia

1st Young rider classification
1st Stages 2 & 8
Held after Stages 2 & 8

~~Tour de France~~

~~1st Stages 6 & 9~~
Held after Stages 10–11
Held after Stages 1–2 & 10–11

5th GP Miguel Induráin
2010
1st Overall Tour of Austria

1st Stages 2 & 4

1st Coppa Sabatini
2nd Overall Giro del Trentino

1st Stage 2

2nd Overall Settimana Ciclista Lombarda

1st Points classification
1st Stages 4 & 6

2nd Grand Prix de Wallonie
4th Overall Settimana internazionale di Coppi e Bartali
9th Giro dell'Emilia
10th Road race, National Road Championships
2011
7th Grand Prix d'Ouverture La Marseillaise

=== Grand Tour general classification results timeline ===
Grand Tour	2006	2007	2008	2009	2010	2011	2012
Giro d'Italia	—	6	2	—	—	—	—
Tour de France	95	—	~~DNF~~	—	—	—	—
Vuelta a España	Did not contest during career						

Legend
—	Did not compete
DNF	Did not finish
~~No.~~	Voided result

== See also ==
- List of doping cases in cycling
