= Brixia Tour =

Italian bicycle race

Race details
- Date: Late July
- Region: Lombardy, Italy
- English name: Brixia Tour
- Local name(s): Brixia Tour (in Italian)
- Discipline: Road race
- Type: Stage Race
- Web site: www.brixiatour.com

History
- First edition: 2001
- Editions: 11
- Final edition: 2011
- First winner: Cadel Evans (AUS)
- Most wins: Davide Rebellin (ITA) (2 wins)
- Final winner: Fortunato Baliani (ITA)

The Brixia Tour was an Italian cycle road race held annually in the province of Brescia, Lombardy. Since 2005, the race has been organised as a 2.1 event on the UCI Europe Tour.

== List of winners ==
Year	Country	Rider	Team
2001	Australia	Cadel Evans	Saeco
2002	Spain	Igor Astarloa	Saeco–Longoni Sport
2003	Slovenia	Martin Derganč	Domina Vacanze
2004	Italy	Danilo Di Luca	Saeco
2005	Italy	Emanuele Sella	Ceramica Panaria–Navigare
2006	Italy	Davide Rebellin	Gerolsteiner
2007	Italy	Davide Rebellin	Gerolsteiner
2008	Italy	Santo Anzà	Diquigiovanni–Androni
2009	Italy	Giampaolo Caruso	Ceramica Flaminia–Bossini Docce
2010	Italy	Domenico Pozzovivo	Colnago–CSF Inox
2011	Italy	Fortunato Baliani	D'Angelo & Antenucci-Nippo
