= List of teams and cyclists in the 2008 Giro d'Italia =

This is the list of teams and cyclists in the 2008 Giro d'Italia.

Key: DNS = Did Not Start stage; DNF = Did Not Finish stage; DSQ = Disqualified from stage; HD = Hors Delai: outside time limit for stage.

#	Rider	Final placing	Notes
LPR Brakes–Ballan
1	Danilo Di Luca (ITA)	8	
2	Paolo Bailetti (ITA)	89	
3	Gabriele Bosisio (ITA)	22	1st, Stage 7
4	Riccardo Chiarini (ITA)	125	
5	Giairo Ermeti (ITA)	83	
6	Jure Golčer (SLO)	32	
7	Daniele Pietropolli (ITA)	57	
8	Paolo Savoldelli (ITA)	15	
9	Alessandro Spezialetti (ITA)	41	
Ag2r–La Mondiale
11	Tadej Valjavec (SLO)	13	
12	Philip Deignan (IRL)	79	
13	Rene Mandri (EST)	DNF 6	Withdrew because of injuries sustained in crash
14	Laurent Mangel (FRA)	93	
15	Rinaldo Nocentini (ITA)	56	
16	Nicolas Rousseau (FRA)	122	
17	Blaise Sonnery (FRA)	91	
18	Alexandre Usov (BLR)	119	
19	Yuriy Krivtsov (UKR)	107	
Astana
21	Levi Leipheimer (USA)	18	
22	Alberto Contador Velasco (ESP)	1	
23	Vladimir Gusev (RUS)	45	
24	Antonio Colom (ESP)	25	
25	Maxim Iglinsky (KAZ)	55	
26	Steve Morabito (SUI)	DNF 8	Withdrew because of dislocated shoulder sustained in crash
27	Andrey Mizurov (KAZ)	66	
28	Andreas Klöden (GER)	DNF 20	Withdrew because of respiratory infection
29	Assan Bazayev (KAZ)	97	
Barloworld
31	Francesco Bellotti (ITA)	DNS 11	Withdrew because of fractured elbow
32	Patrick Calcagni (SUI)	DNF 7	Withdrew because of food poisoning and tendinitis.
33	Félix Cárdenas (COL)	16	
34	Steve Cummings (GBR)	96	
35	Enrico Gasparotto (ITA)	92	
36	Christian Pfannberger (AUT)	DNF 15	Withdrew because of unknown reason
37	Carlo Scognamiglio (ITA)	126	
38	Mauricio Soler (COL)	DNF 11	Withdrew because of cold
39	Geraint Thomas (GBR)	118	
Caisse d'Epargne
41	Marlon Alirio Pérez (COL)	90	
42	Joan Horrach (ESP)	81	
43	Vladimir Karpets (RUS)	31	
44	Pablo Lastras (ESP)	64	
45	Francisco Pérez (ESP)	67	
46	Mathieu Perget (FRA)	112	
47	Joaquim Rodríguez (ESP)	17	
48	José Rujano (VEN)	49	
49	Luis Pasamontes (ESP)	36	
Cofidis
51	Mickaël Buffaz (FRA)	121	
52	Kevin De Weert (BEL)	DNF 6	Withdrew for unknown reason
53	Bingen Fernández (ESP)	DNF 9	Withdrew because of crash
54	Nicolas Hartmann (FRA)	127	
55	Steve Zampieri (SUI)	DNS 10	Withdrew for unknown reason
56	Yann Huguet (FRA)	135	
57	Damien Monier (FRA)	111	
58	Nick Nuyens (BEL)	DNS 5	Withdrew because of fractured collarbone sustained in crash
59	Rik Verbrugghe (BEL)	DNF 11	Withdrew because of exhaustion
CSF Group–Navigare
61	Emanuele Sella (ITA)	6	1st, Stages 14, 15 and 20
62	Fortunato Baliani (ITA)	12	
63	Maximiliano Richeze (ARG)	DNS 1	Failed drugs test
64	Luis Felipe Laverde (COL)	24	
65	Julio Alberto Pérez (MEX)	76	
66	Filippo Savini (ITA)	DNF 9	Withdrew because of knee injuring sustained in crash
67	Matteo Priamo (ITA)	DNS 13	1st, Stage 6 Withdrew for unknown reason
68	Tiziano dall'Antonia (ITA)	98	
69	Domenico Pozzovivo (ITA)	9	
Euskaltel–Euskadi
71	Josu Agirre (ESP)	138	
72	Lander Aperribay (ESP)	HD 16	
73	Koldo Fernández (ESP)	DNS 14	Planned withdrawal
74	Aitor Galdós (ESP)	DNF 7	Withdrew because of exhaustion
75	Dionisio Galparsoro (ESP)	DNF 19	Withdrew because of leg pain
76	Markel Irizar (ESP)	74	
77	Iñigo Landaluze (ESP)	DNF 15	Withdrew because of stomach illness
78	Alan Pérez (ESP)	72	
79	Iván Velasco (ESP)	54	
Française des Jeux
81	Mikaël Cherel (FRA)	DNF 19	Withdrew for unknown reason
82	Timothy Gudsell (NZL)	136	
83	Yauheni Hutarovich (BLR)	DNF 7	Withdrew for unknown reason
84	Lilian Jégou (FRA)	85	
85	Yoann Le Boulanger (FRA)	27	
86	Guillaume Levarlet (FRA)	113	
87	Jérémy Roy (FRA)	82	
88	Tom Stubbe (BEL)	DNF 4	Withdrew for unknown reason
89	Jussi Veikkanen (FIN)	50	
Gerolsteiner
91	Robert Förster (GER)	DNS 14	Planned withdrawal
92	Thomas Fothen (GER)	HD 16	
93	Johannes Fröhlinger (GER)	51	
94	Oscar Gatto (ITA)	DNF 14	Withdrew for unknown reason
95	Sven Krauss (GER)	131	
96	Andrea Moletta (ITA)	DNS 11	Withdrew for personal reasons
97	Volker Ordowski (GER)	DNF 11	Withdrew for unknown reason
98	Davide Rebellin (ITA)	DNS 14	Withdrew because of exhaustion
99	Matthias Russ (GER)	DNF 15	Withdrew because of stomach illness
Team High Road
101	Mark Cavendish (GBR)	132	1st, Stages 4 and 13
102	André Greipel (GER)	133	1st, Stage 17
103	Adam Hansen (AUS)	108	
104	Tony Martin (GER)	128	
105	Marco Pinotti (ITA)	65	1st, Stage 21
106	Morris Possoni (ITA)	44	
107	František Raboň (CZE)	101	
108	Kanstantsin Sivtsov (BLR)	DNF 20	Withdrew for unknown reason
109	Bradley Wiggins (GBR)	134	
Lampre
111	Marzio Bruseghin (ITA)	3	1st, Stage 10
112	Paolo Bossoni (ITA)	HD 16	
113	Fabio Baldato (ITA)	109	
114	David Loosli (SUI)	63	
115	Sylvester Szmyd (POL)	23	
116	Simon Špilak (SLO)	48	
117	Mirco Lorenzetto (ITA)	DNF 14	Withdrew for unknown reason
118	Mauro Santambrogio (ITA)	DNF 11	Withdrew for unknown reason
119	Francesco Gavazzi (ITA)	84	
Liquigas
121	Daniele Bennati (ITA)	70	1st, Stages 3, 9 and 12
122	Kjell Carlström (FIN)	123	
123	Dario Cataldo (ITA)	DNF 15	Withdrew for unknown reason
124	Vladimir Miholjević (CRO)	21	
125	Vincenzo Nibali (ITA)	11	
126	Andrea Noè (ITA)	39	
127	Franco Pellizotti (ITA)	4	1st, Stage 16
128	Alessandro Vanotti (ITA)	86	
129	Charly Wegelius (GBR)	69	
Quick-Step
131	Paolo Bettini (ITA)	19	
132	Alexander Efimkin (RUS)	68	
133	Addy Engels (NED)	105	
134	Mauro Facci (ITA)	115	
135	Juan Manuel Gárate (ESP)	37	
136	Hubert Schwab (SUI)	100	
137	Kevin Seeldraeyers (BEL)	73	
138	Andrea Tonti (ITA)	33	
139	Giovanni Visconti (ITA)	42	
Rabobank
141	Denis Menchov (RUS)	5	
142	Graeme Brown (AUS)	DNF 14	Withdrew for unknown reason
143	Bram de Groot (NED)	120	
144	Theo Eltink (NED)	77	
145	Mathew Hayman (AUS)	HD 16	
146	Dmitry Kozontchuk (RUS)	59	
147	Gerben Löwik (NED)	116	
148	Paul Martens (GER)	78	
149	Mauricio Ardila (COL)	20	
Saunier Duval–Scott
151	Riccardo Riccò (ITA)	2	1st, Stage 2 and 8
152	José Alberto Benítez (ESP)	106	
153	Raivis Belohvoščiks (LAT)	HD 16	
154	Eros Capecchi (ITA)	99	
155	David Cañada (ESP)	58	
156	Ermanno Capelli (ITA)	DNF 15	Withdrew for unknown reason
157	Iker Camaño (ESP)	75	
158	Luciano Pagliarini (BRA)	DNF 14	Withdrew for unknown reason
159	Leonardo Piepoli (ITA)	DNF 15	Withdrew because of crash
Diquigiovanni–Androni
161	Gilberto Simoni (ITA)	10	
162	Alessandro Bertolini (ITA)	89	1st, Stage 11
163	Danilo Hondo (GER)	104	
164	Raffaele Illiano (ITA)	103	
165	Ruslan Ivanov (MDA)	43	
166	Gabriele Missaglia (ITA)	71	
167	Daniele Nardello (ITA)	46	
168	Carlos José Ochoa (VEN)	61	
169	José Serpa (COL)	26	
Silence–Lotto
171	Geert Steurs (BEL)	DNS 11	Withdrew because of cysts
172	Dominique Cornu (BEL)	DNF 4	Withdrew because of injuries sustained in crash
173	Francis De Greef (BEL)	40	
174	Dries Devenyns (BEL)	117	
175	Nick Gates (AUS)	139	
176	Matthew Lloyd (AUS)	30	
177	Robbie McEwen (AUS)	DNS 14	Planned withdrawal
178	Jurgen Van den Broeck (BEL)	7	
179	Wim Van Huffel (BEL)	38	
Slipstream–Chipotle
181	Magnus Bäckstedt (SWE)	DNS 10	Withdrew because of fever
182	Julian Dean (NZL)	DNS 19	Withdrew because of injury
183	Ryder Hesjedal (CAN)	60	
184	David Millar (GBR)	94	
185	Pat McCarty (USA)	DNF 14	Withdrew because of bronchitis
186	Danny Pate (USA)	137	
187	Christopher Sutton (AUS)	HD 16	
188	Christian Vande Velde (USA)	52	
189	David Zabriskie (USA)	DNF 2	Withdrew becauwse of injuries sustained in crash
Team CSC
191	Anders Lund (DEN)	102	
192	Bradley McGee (AUS)	DNF 3	Withdrew because of fractured collarbone sustained in crash
193	Chris Anker Sørensen (DEN)	28	
194	Gustav Larsson (SWE)	14	
195	Jason McCartney (USA)	95	
196	Jens Voigt (GER)	53	1st, Stage 18
197	Michael Blaudzun (DEN)	62	
198	Nicki Sørensen (DEN)	34	
199	Stuart O'Grady (AUS)	DNS 4	Withdrew because of fractured collarbone sustained in crash
Team Milram
201	Erik Zabel (GER)	80	
202	Igor Astarloa (ESP)	DNS 2	Withdrew because of fever and stomach illness
203	Markus Eichler (GER)	141	
204	Sergio Ghisalberti (ITA)	DNF 8	Withdrew because of torn muscle fiber in right thigh
205	Matej Jurčo (SVK)	129	
206	Alberto Ongarato (ITA)	130	
207	Enrico Poitschke (GER)	DNF 6	Withdrew for unknown reason
208	Fabio Sabatini (ITA)	DNS 13	Withdrew for unknown reason
209	Marco Velo (ITA)	87	
Tinkoff Credit Systems
211	Evgeni Petrov (RUS)	29	
212	Vasil Kiryienka (BLR)	35	1st, Stage 19
213	Luca Mazzanti (ITA)	47	
214	Alberto Loddo (ITA)	DNF 7	Withdrew for unknown reason
215	Mikhail Ignatiev (RUS)	140	
216	Nikolay Trusov (RUS)	114	
217	Pavel Brutt (RUS)	DNS 10	1st, Stage 5 Withdrew for unknown reason
218	Serguei Klimov (RUS)	110	
219	Alexander Serov (RUS)	124	
