= List of teams and cyclists in the 2007 Giro d'Italia =

List of teams and cyclists in the 2007 Giro d'Italia and the results:

== Quick Step-Innergetic ==
No	Rider	Final GC
Quick Step-Innergetic
1	(Italy) Paolo Bettini	41
2	(Netherlands) Addy Engels	81
3	(Italy) Mauro Facci	34
4	(Italy) Leonardo Scarselli	101
5	(Switzerland) Hubert Schwab	56
6	(Italy) Andrea Tonti	DNS Stage 3
7	(Italy) Matteo Tosatto	94
8	(Belgium) Jurgen Van de Walle	DNF Stage 14
9	(Italy) Giovanni Visconti	77

== Astana ==
No	Rider	Final GC
Astana
11	(Italy) Paolo Savoldelli	12
12	(Kazakhstan) Maxim Gourov	118
13	(Luxembourg) Benoît Joachim	99
14	(Kazakhstan) Assan Bazayev	98
15	(Kazakhstan) Serguei Yakovlev	DNF Stage 15
16	(Italy) Eddy Mazzoleni	3
17	(Kazakhstan) Andrey Mizurov	21
18	(Switzerland) Steve Morabito	83
19	(Kazakhstan) Dmitriy Muravyev	51

== Saunier Duval– Prodir ==
No	Rider	Final GC
Saunier Duval
21	(Italy) Gilberto Simoni	4
22	(Switzerland) Rubens Bertogliati	DNF Stage 15
23	(Latvia) Raivis Belohvoščiks	117
24	(Spain) David Cañada	59
25	(Spain) Ángel Gómez	80
26	(Italy) Manuele Mori	DNF Stage 15
27	(Spain) Iban Mayo	38
28	(Italy) Leonardo Piepoli	14
29	(Italy) Ricardo Ricco	6

== Lampre–Fondital ==
No	Rider	Final GC
Lampre–Fondital
31	(Italy) Damiano Cunego	5
32	(Italy) Matteo Bono	139
33	(Italy) Marzio Bruseghin	8
34	(Italy) Marco Marzano	37
35	(Italy) Danilo Napolitano	DNF Stage 12
36	(Slovenia) Gorazd Štangelj	78
37	(Poland) Sylvester Szmyd	28
38	(Italy) Paolo Tiralongo	26
39	(Spain) Patxi Vila	15

== Acqua & Sapone–Caffe Mokambo ==
No	Rider	Final GC
Acqua & Sapone–Caffe Mokambo
41	(Italy) Stefano Garzelli	16
42	(Italy) Dario Andriotto	111
43	(Russia) Alexandr Arekeev	DNF Stage 14
44	(Italy) Gabriele Balducci	DNF Stage 12
45	(Italy) Massimo Codol	23
46	(Belarus) Andrei Kunitski	85
47	(Italy) Simone Masciarelli	DNF Stage 12
47	(Italy) Giuseppe Palumbo	90
48	(Belarus) Branislau Samoilau	22

== Ag2r Prévoyance ==
No	Rider	Final GC
Ag2r Prévoyance
51	(Italy) Rinaldo Nocentini	47
52	(France) Hubert Dupont	25
53	(Ukraine) Yuriy Krivtsov	71
54	(France) Julien Loubet	DNS Stage 8
55	(France) Laurent Mangel	112
56	(France) Lloyd Mondory	108
57	(France) Carl Naibo	53
58	(France) Christophe Riblon	82
59	(Belarus) Alexandre Usov	106

== Bouygues Télécom ==
No	Rider	Final GC
Bouygues Télécom
61	(France) Olivier Bonnaire	45
62	(France) Nicolas Crosbie	88
63	(France) Pierre Drancourt	129
64	(France) Yohann Gène	DNF Stage 10
65	(France) Arnaud Labbe	DNF Stage 10
66	(France) Yoann Le Boulanger	30
67	(France) Alexandre Pichot	125
68	(France) Franck Rénier	119
69	(France) Thomas Voeckler	DNS Stage 8

== Caisse d'Epargne ==
No	Rider	Final GC
Caisse d'Epargne
71	(Spain) David Arroyo	10
72	(France) Éric Berthou	89
73	(Spain) Joan Horrach	DNS Stage 5
74	(Spain) Pablo Lastras	42
75	(Spain) Alberto Losada	60
76	(Spain) Aitor Pérez	32
77	(Spain) José Joaquín Rojas Gil	DNF Stage 10
78	(Russia) Alexei Markov	DNF Stage 10
79	(France) Mathieu Perget	91

== Ceramica Panaria–Navigare ==
No	Rider	Final GC
Ceramica Panaria–Navigare
81	(Italy) Emanuele Sella	11
82	(Colombia) Luis Felipe Laverde	36
83	(Mexico) Julio Alberto Pérez	40
84	(Italy) Andrea Pagoto	95
85	(Italy) Domenico Pozzovivo	17
86	(Italy) Fortunato Baliani	24
87	(Italy) Paride Grillo	DNF Stage 10
88	(Italy) Luca Mazzanti	31
89	(Argentina) Maximiliano Richeze	92

== Cofidis ==
No	Rider	Final GC
Cofidis
91	(Colombia) Iván Parra	13
92	(France) Frédéric Bessy	66
93	(France) Mickaël Buffaz	126
94	(France) Hervé Duclos-Lassalle	103
95	(Spain) Bingen Fernández	29
96	(Netherlands) Mathieu Heijboer	DNF Stage 14
97	(France) Amaël Moinard	46
98	(France) Tristan Valentin	132
99	(Switzerland) Steve Zampieri	DNF Stage 14

== Crédit Agricole ==
No	Rider	Final GC
Crédit Agricole
101	(Italy) Pietro Caucchioli	27
102	(Italy) Francesco Bellotti	DNF Stage 14
103	(Hungary) László Bodrogi	84
104	(New Zealand) Julian Dean	93
105	(Italy) Angelo Furlan	116
106	(France) Patrice Halgand	DNF Stage 6
107	(France) Christophe Kern	114
108	(Norway) Thor Hushovd	DNF Stage 12
109	(Republic of Ireland) Nicolas Roche	123

== Discovery Channel Pro Cycling Team ==
No	Rider	Final GC
Discovery Channel Pro Cycling Team
111	(Ukraine) Yaroslav Popovych	DNS Stage 13
112	(Ukraine) Volodymyr Bileka	49
113	(United Kingdom) Steve Cummings	110
114	(United States) George Hincapie	DNS Stage 12
115	(Czech Republic) Pavel Padrnos	73
116	(Spain) José Luis Rubiera	39
117	(Belgium) Jurgen van Goolen	96
118	(Denmark) Brian Vandborg	DNF Stage 14
119	(Australia) Matthew White	105

== Euskaltel-Euskadi ==
No	Rider	Final GC
Euskaltel-Euskadi
121	(Spain) Benat Albizuri	DNF Stage 8
122	(Spain) Koldo Fernández	136
123	(Spain) Dionisio Galparsoro	DNF Stage 12
124	(Spain) Aitor Hernández	DNS Stage 12
125	(Spain) Markel Irizar	68
126	(Spain) Anton Luengo	140
127	(Spain) Aketza Peña	DNS Stage 17
128	(Spain) Iván Velasco	76
129	(Spain) Joseba Zubeldia	DNF Stage 14

== Française des Jeux ==
No	Rider	Final GC
Française des Jeux
131	(France) Carlos da Cruz	DNS Stage 1
132	(France) Arnaud Gérard	124
133	(New Zealand) Timothy Gudsell	DNF Stage 7
134	(France) Lilian Jégou	75
135	(South Africa) Ian McLeod	DNF Stage 4
136	(France) Cyrille Monnerais	DNF Stage 8
137	(France) Francis Mourey	43
138	(France) Fabian Patanchon	131
139	(Finland) Jussi Veikkanen	44

== Gerolsteiner ==
No	Rider	Final GC
Gerolsteiner
141	(Italy) Davide Rebellin	DNS Stage 11
142	(Germany) Robert Förster	DNS Stage 12
143	(Germany) Thomas Fothen	122
144	(Italy) Oscar Gatto	141
145	(Germany) Tim Klinger	DNF Stage 12
146	(Germany) Sven Krauss	135
147	(Germany) Volker Ordowski	DNF Stage 2
148	(Germany) Matthias Russ	54
149	(Switzerland) Oliver Zaugg	DNF Stage 14

== Liquigas ==
No	Rider	Final GC
Liquigas
151	(Italy) Danilo Di Luca	1
152	(Italy) Enrico Gasparotto	97
153	(Croatia) Vladimir Miholjević	65
154	(Italy) Vincenzo Nibali	19
155	(Italy) Andrea Noè	35
156	(Italy) Franco Pellizotti	9
157	(Italy) Alessandro Spezialetti	63
158	(Italy) Alessandro Vanotti	107
159	(United Kingdom) Charly Wegelius	DNF Stage 18

== Predictor–Lotto ==
No	Rider	Final GC
Predictor-Lotto
161	(Australia) Robbie McEwen	DNS Stage 12
162	(Italy) Dario Cioni	33
163	(Spain) Josep Jufré	52
164	(Australia) Matthew Lloyd	61
165	(Belgium) Mario Aerts	20
166	(Belgium) Jurgen Van den Broeck	74
167	(Belgium) Wim Van Huffel	DNF Stage 15
168	(Italy) Stefano Zanini	134
169	(Australia) Nick Gates	127

== Rabobank ==
No	Rider	Final GC
Rabobank
171	(Denmark) Michael Rasmussen	48
172	(Colombia) Mauricio Ardila	67
173	(Australia) Graeme Brown	DNF Stage 3
174	(Netherlands) Koos Moerenhout	70
175	(Netherlands) Max van Heeswijk	DNF Stage 14
176	(Russia) Dmitry Kozontchouk	100
177	(Netherlands) Léon van Bon	DNF Stage 6
178	(Australia) William Walker	57
179	(Spain) Pedro Horrillo	121

== Team CSC ==
No	Rider	Final GC
Team CSC
181	(Switzerland) Fabian Cancellara	DNF Stage 12
182	(United States) David Zabriskie	58
183	(Luxembourg) Andy Schleck	2
184	(Argentina) Juan José Haedo	DNF Stage 10
185	(Russia) Alexandr Kolobnev	DNF Stage 12
186	(Denmark) Michael Blaudzun	DNF Stage 8
187	(Denmark) Matti Breschel	120
188	(Ukraine) Volodymir Gustov	69
189	(Norway) Kurt Asle Arvesen	62

== Team Milram ==
No	Rider	Final GC
Team Milram
191	(Italy) Alessandro Petacchi	DSQ
192	(Italy) Alessandro Cortinovis	113
193	(Italy) Sergio Ghisalberti	DNF Stage 10
194	(Germany) Christian Knees	72
195	(Australia) Brett Lancaster	115
196	(Germany) Martin Müller	130
197	(Italy) Alberto Ongarato	DNF Stage 10
198	(Italy) Fabio Sabatini	DNF Stage 14
199	(Italy) Mirco Lorenzetto	109

== Tinkoff Credit Systems ==
No	Rider	Final GC
Tinkoff Credit Systems
201	(Italy) Salvatore Commesso	55
202	(Russia) Evgeni Petrov	7
203	(Italy) Daniele Contrini	86
204	(Russia) Ivan Rovny	DNS Stage 14
205	(Spain) Ricardo Serrano	102
206	(Russia) Mikhail Ignatiev	128
207	(Russia) Pavel Brutt	87
208	(Italy) Elio Aggiano	138
209	(Russia) Nikolai Trusov	133

== T-Mobile Team ==
No	Rider	Final GC
T-Mobile Team
211	(Canada) Michael Barry	DNS Stage 2
212	(Italy) Lorenzo Bernucci	64
213	(Australia) Adam Hansen	DNS Stage 3
214	(New Zealand) Gregory Henderson	DNF Stage 10
215	(Belgium) Axel Merckx	50
216	(United States) Aaron Olsen	137
217	(Italy) Marco Pinotti	18
218	(Czech Republic) František Raboň	79
219	(Germany) Thomas Ziegler	DNS Stage 6
