= 2007 Tour de Langkawi =

2006–07 UCI Asia Tour, race 8 of 24

Race details
- Dates: 2–11 February 2007
- Stages: 10
- Distance: 1,352.2 km (840.2 mi)
- Winning time: 32h 32' 14"

Results
Jersey awarded to the overall winner	Winner	Anthony Charteau (FRA)	(Crédit Agricole)
	Second	José Serpa (COL)	(Diquigiovanni–Selle Italia)
	Third	Walter Pedraza (COL)	(Diquigiovanni–Selle Italia)
Jersey awarded to the points classification winner	Points	Alberto Loddo (ITA)	(Diquigiovanni–Selle Italia)
Jersey awarded to the mountains classification winner	Mountains	Walter Pedraza (COL)	(Diquigiovanni–Selle Italia)
	Team	Giant Asia Racing Team	

The 2007 Tour de Langkawi was the 12th edition of the Tour de Langkawi, a cycling stage race that took place in Malaysia. It started on 2 February in Langkawi and ended on 11 February in Kuala Lumpur. This race was rated by the Union Cycliste Internationale (UCI) as a 2.HC (hors category) race on the 2006–07 UCI Asia Tour calendar.

Anthony Charteau, the French cyclist emerged as the winner of the race, followed by two Colombian cyclists; José Serpa second and Walter Pedraza third. Alberto Loddo of Italy won the points classification category and Walter Pedraza won the mountains classification category. Giant Asia Racing Team won the team classification category.

== Stages ==
The cyclists competed in 10 stages, covering a distance of 1,352.2 kilometres. Stage 3 and Stage 8 were mountain type stage.

Stage	Date	Course	Distance	Stage result		
Stage	Date	Course	Distance	Winner	Second	Third
1	2 February	Langkawi	81.4 km (50.6 mi)	Alberto Loddo (ITA)	Guillermo Bongiorno (ARG)	Maximiliano Richeze (ARG)
2	3 February	Kangar to Kulim	166.2 km (103.3 mi)	Maximiliano Richeze (ARG)	Daryl Impey (RSA)	Alberto Loddo (ITA)
3	4 February	Kuala Kangsar to Cameron Highlands	133.2 km (82.8 mi)	Anthony Charteau (FRA)	Walter Pedraza (COL)	Yoann Le Boulanger (FRA)
4	5 February	Gua Musang to Kota Bharu	178.1 km (110.7 mi)	Alberto Loddo (ITA)	Maximiliano Richeze (ARG)	Daryl Impey (RSA)
5	6 February	Kota Bharu to Kuala Terengganu	167.0 km (103.8 mi)	Alberto Loddo (ITA)	Maximiliano Richeze (ARG)	Nicholas Sanderson (AUS)
6	7 February	Kuala Terengganu to Chukai	141.5 km (87.9 mi)	Alberto Loddo (ITA)	Maximiliano Richeze (ARG)	Brad Huff (USA)
7	8 February	Kuantan to Karak	174.0 km (108.1 mi)	Shinichi Fukushima (JPN)	Elio Aggiano (ITA)	Pierre Drancourt (FRA)
8	9 February	Shah Alam to Genting Highlands	84.4 km (52.4 mi)	José Serpa (COL)	Walter Pedraza (COL)	José Rujano (VEN)
9	10 February	Putrajaya to Seremban	170.5 km (105.9 mi)	Pavel Brutt (RUS)	Sergey Kolesnikov (RUS)	Pierre Drancourt (FRA)
10	11 February	Kuala Lumpur Criterium	55.9 km (34.7 mi)	Alberto Loddo (ITA)	Nikolay Trusov (RUS)	Maximiliano Richeze (ARG)

== Classification leadership ==
Stage	Winner	General classification	Points classification	Mountains classification	Asian rider classification	Team classification	Asian team classification
1	Alberto Loddo	Alberto Loddo	Alberto Loddo	Koji Fukushima	Koji Fukushima	Ceramica Panaria–Navigare	LeTua Cycling Team
2	Maximiliano Richeze	Maximiliano Richeze	Maximiliano Richeze	Koji Fukushima	Koji Fukushima	Ceramica Panaria–Navigare	LeTua Cycling Team
3	Anthony Charteau	Anthony Charteau	Maximiliano Richeze	Anthony Charteau	Yukihiro Doi	Crédit Agricole	Giant Asia Racing Team
4	Alberto Loddo	Anthony Charteau	Alberto Loddo	Anthony Charteau	Hossein Askari	Crédit Agricole	Islamic Azad University Cycling Team
5	Alberto Loddo	Anthony Charteau	Alberto Loddo	Anthony Charteau	Hossein Askari	Crédit Agricole	Islamic Azad University Cycling Team
6	Alberto Loddo	Anthony Charteau	Alberto Loddo	Anthony Charteau	Hossein Askari	Crédit Agricole	Islamic Azad University Cycling Team
7	Shinichi Fukushima	Anthony Charteau	Alberto Loddo	Anthony Charteau	Shinichi Fukushima	Crédit Agricole	Nippo-Meitan Hompo
8	José Serpa	Anthony Charteau	Alberto Loddo	Walter Pedraza	Ghader Mizbani	Crédit Agricole	Giant Asia Racing Team
9	Pavel Brutt	Anthony Charteau	Alberto Loddo	Walter Pedraza	Ghader Mizbani	Giant Asia Racing Team	Giant Asia Racing Team
10	Alberto Loddo	Anthony Charteau	Alberto Loddo	Walter Pedraza	Ghader Mizbani	Giant Asia Racing Team	Giant Asia Racing Team
Final		Anthony Charteau	Alberto Loddo	Walter Pedraza	Ghader Mizbani	Giant Asia Racing Team	Giant Asia Racing Team

== Final standings ==
=== General classification ===
	Rider	Team	Time
1	(France) Anthony Charteau	Crédit Agricole	32h 32' 14"
2	(Colombia) José Serpa	Diquigiovanni–Selle Italia	+ 01' 02"
3	(Colombia) Walter Pedraza	Diquigiovanni–Selle Italia	+ 01' 34"
4	(South Africa) David George	South Africa	+ 03' 06"
5	(Australia) Jai Crawford	Giant Asia Racing Team	+ 04' 05"
6	(Iran) Ghader Mizbani	Giant Asia Racing Team	+ 04' 14"
7	(Russia) Pavel Brutt	Tinkoff Credit Systems	+ 04' 21"
8	(Japan) Yukihiro Doi	Skil–Shimano	+ 04' 43"
9	(Spain) Luis Pasamontes	Unibet.com	+ 04' 53"
10	(Iran) Hossein Askari	Giant Asia Racing Team	+ 04' 54"

=== Points classification ===
	Rider	Team	Points
1	(Italy) Alberto Loddo	Diquigiovanni–Selle Italia	109
2	(Argentina) Maximiliano Richeze	Ceramica Panaria–Navigare	83
3	(South Africa) Daryl Impey	South Africa	64
4	(Russia) Nikolai Trusov	Tinkoff Credit Systems	62
5	(South Korea) Park Sung-Baek	South Korea	59

=== Mountains classification ===
	Rider	Team	Points
1	(Colombia) Walter Pedraza	Diquigiovanni–Selle Italia	39
2	(South Africa) David George	South Africa	35
3	(Colombia) José Serpa	Diquigiovanni–Selle Italia	33
4	(France) Anthony Charteau	Crédit Agricole	33
5	(Venezuela) José Rujano	Unibet.com	26
6	(Japan) Koji Fukushima	Nippo-Meitan Hompo	22
7	(Iran) Ghader Mizbani	Giant Asia Racing Team	14
8	(Spain) Luis Pasamontes	Unibet.com	11
9	(Australia) Jai Crawford	Giant Asia Racing Team	10
10	(Japan) Yukiya Arashiro	Nippo-Meitan Hompo	10

=== Asian rider classification ===
	Rider	Team	Time
1	(Iran) Ghader Mizbani	Giant Asia Racing Team	32h 36' 28"
2	(Japan) Yukihiro Doi	Skil–Shimano	+ 29"
3	(Iran) Hossein Askari	Giant Asia Racing Team	+ 40"
4	(Indonesia) Tonton Susanto	LeTua Cycling Team	+ 06' 38"
5	(South Korea) Park Sung-Baek	South Korea	+ 07' 23"
6	(Japan) Shinichi Fukushima	Giant Asia Racing Team	+ 09' 37"
7	(Iran) Abbas Saeid Tanha	Islamic Azad University Cycling Team	+ 09' 41"
8	(Kazakhstan) Yevgeniv Yakovlev	Polygon Sweet Nice	+ 09' 49"
9	(Iran) Mostafa Seyed-Rezaei	Islamic Azad University Cycling Team	+ 10' 12"
10	(Malaysia) Ng Yong Li	Vitória–ASC	+ 11' 28"

=== Team classification ===
	Team	Time
1	Giant Asia Racing Team	97h 49' 58"
2	Unibet.com	+ 04' 30"
3	Crédit Agricole	+ 09' 25"
4	Tinkoff Credit Systems	+ 09' 57"
5	Slipstream–Chipotle	+ 11' 59"
6	SouthAustralia.com	+ 15' 32"
7	Diquigiovanni–Selle Italia	+ 15' 35"
8	South Africa	+ 23' 29"
9	Skil–Shimano	+ 26' 17"
10	Bouygues Télécom	+ 26' 45"

=== Asian team classification ===
	Team	Time
1	Giant Asia Racing Team	98h 09' 28"
2	Islamic Azad University Cycling Team	+ 16' 26"
3	Nippo-Meitan Hompo	+ 19' 17"
4	South Korea	+ 23' 40"
5	LeTua Cycling Team	+ 53' 15"
6	MNCF Development	+ 01h 12' 12"
7	Malaysia	+ 01h 44' 09"

== Stage results ==
=== Stage 1 ===
2 February 2007 — Langkawi, 81.4 km (50.6 mi)

	Rider	Team	Time
1	(Italy) Alberto Loddo	Diquigiovanni–Selle Italia	01h 49' 23"
2	(Argentina) Guillermo Bongiorno	Ceramica Panaria–Navigare	s.t.
3	(Argentina) Maximiliano Richeze	Ceramica Panaria–Navigare	s.t.
4	(United States) Brad Huff	Slipstream–Chipotle	s.t.
5	(Russia) Nikolai Trusov	Tinkoff Credit Systems	s.t.
6	(Malaysia) Ahmad Haidar Anuawar	LeTua Cycling Team	s.t.
7	(Australia) Nicholas Sanderson	SouthAustralia.com	s.t.
8	(France) William Bonnet	Crédit Agricole	s.t.
9	(South Africa) Rupert Rheeder	South Africa	s.t.
10	(Japan) Takashi Miyazawa	Nippo-Meitan Hompo	s.t.

=== Stage 2 ===
3 February 2007 — Kangar to Kulim, 166.2 km (103.3 mi)

	Rider	Team	Time
1	(Argentina) Maximiliano Richeze	Ceramica Panaria–Navigare	03h 55' 41"
2	(South Africa) Daryl Impey	South Africa	s.t.
3	(Italy) Alberto Loddo	Diquigiovanni–Selle Italia	s.t.
4	(South Korea) Park Sung-Baek	South Korea	s.t.
5	(Russia) Nikolai Trusov	Tinkoff Credit Systems	s.t.
6	(New Zealand) Julian Dean	Crédit Agricole	s.t.
7	(Spain) Luis Pasamontes	Unibet.com	s.t.
8	(United States) Brad Huff	Slipstream–Chipotle	s.t.
9	(France) William Bonnet	Crédit Agricole	s.t.
10	(Japan) Masahiro Shinagawa	Skil–Shimano	s.t.

=== Stage 3 ===
4 February 2007 — Kuala Kangsar to Cameron Highlands, 133.2 km (82.8 mi)

	Rider	Team	Time
1	(France) Anthony Charteau	Crédit Agricole	03h 40' 51"
2	(Colombia) Walter Pedraza	Diquigiovanni–Selle Italia	+ 03' 54"
3	(France) Yoann Le Boulanger	Bouygues Télécom	+ 04' 29"
4	(France) Thomas Voeckler	Bouygues Télécom	s.t.
5	(Russia) Pavel Brutt	Tinkoff Credit Systems	+ 04' 31"
6	(Spain) Luis Pasamontes	Unibet.com	s.t.
7	(France) Julien Loubet	AG2R Prévoyance	s.t.
8	(France) Benoît Poilvet	Crédit Agricole	s.t.
9	(South Africa) Ian McLeod	Française des Jeux	s.t.
10	(Japan) Yukihiro Doi	Skil–Shimano	+ 04' 36"

=== Stage 4 ===
5 February 2007 — Gua Musang to Kota Bharu, 178.1 km (110.7 mi)

	Rider	Team	Time
1	(Italy) Alberto Loddo	Diquigiovanni–Selle Italia	04h 00' 58"
2	(Argentina) Maximiliano Richeze	Ceramica Panaria–Navigare	s.t.
3	(South Africa) Daryl Impey	South Africa	s.t.
4	(United States) Brad Huff	Slipstream–Chipotle	s.t.
5	(South Korea) Park Sung-Baek	South Korea	s.t.
6	(Japan) Masahiro Shinagawa	Skil–Shimano	s.t.
7	(Japan) Yukiya Arashiro	Nippo-Meitan Hompo	s.t.
8	(Australia) Nicholas Sanderson	SouthAustralia.com	s.t.
9	(Malaysia) Anuar Manan	LeTua Cycling Team	s.t.
10	(Russia) Nikolay Trusov	Tinkoff Credit Systems	s.t.

=== Stage 5 ===
6 February 2007 — Kota Bharu to Kuala Terengganu, 167 km (103.8 mi)

	Rider	Team	Time
1	(Italy) Alberto Loddo	Diquigiovanni–Selle Italia	03h 55' 07"
2	(Argentina) Maximiliano Richeze	Ceramica Panaria–Navigare	s.t.
3	(Australia) Nicholas Sanderson	SouthAustralia.com	s.t.
4	(New Zealand) Julian Dean	Crédit Agricole	s.t.
5	(Malaysia) Ahmad Haidar Anuawar	LeTua Cycling Team	s.t.
6	(South Korea) Park Sung-Baek	South Korea	s.t.
7	(Portugal) Pedro Costa	Vitória–ASC	s.t.
8	(Malaysia) Anuar Manan	LeTua Cycling Team	s.t.
9	(South Africa) Daryl Impey	South Africa	s.t.
10	(Russia) Nikolay Trusov	Tinkoff Credit Systems	s.t.

=== Stage 6 ===
7 February 2007 — Kuala Terengganu to Chukai, 141.5 km (87.9 mi)

	Rider	Team	Time
1	(Italy) Alberto Loddo	Diquigiovanni–Selle Italia	03h 00' 57"
2	(Argentina) Maximiliano Richeze	Ceramica Panaria–Navigare	s.t.
3	(United States) Brad Huff	Slipstream–Chipotle	s.t.
4	(Japan) Takashi Miyazawa	Nippo-Meitan Hompo	s.t.
5	(Poland) Mariusz Wiesiak	Nippo-Meitan Hompo	s.t.
6	(South Korea) Park Sung-Baek	South Korea	s.t.
7	(South Africa) Rupert Rheeder	South Africa	s.t.
8	(France) William Bonnet	Crédit Agricole	s.t.
9	(Portugal) Pedro Costa	Vitória–ASC	s.t.
10	(France) Franck Rénier	Bouygues Télécom	s.t.

=== Stage 7 ===
8 February 2007 — Kuantan to Karak, 174 km (108.1 mi)

	Rider	Team	Time
1	(Japan) Shinichi Fukushima	Nippo-Meitan Hompo	03h 47' 42"
2	(Italy) Elio Aggiano	Tinkoff Credit Systems	+ 02"
3	(France) Pierre Drancourt	Bouygues Télécom	+ 12"
4	(Italy) Francesco Tomei	Ceramica Panaria–Navigare	+ 40"
5	(Belgium) Erwin Thijs	Unibet.com	s/t
6	(South Korea) Lee Won-Jae	South Korea	+ 42"
7	(Malaysia) Loh Sea Keong	Discovery Channel–Marco Polo	+ 01' 09"
8	(Japan) Yoshiyuki Abe	Skil–Shimano	+ 01' 22"
9	(Italy) Alberto Loddo	Diquigiovanni–Selle Italia	s.t.
10	(South Africa) Johannes Kachelhoffer	South Africa	s.t.

=== Stage 8 ===
9 February 2007 — Shah Alam to Genting Highlands, 84.4 km (52.4 mi)

	Rider	Team	Time
1	(Colombia) José Serpa	Diquigiovanni–Selle Italia	02h 25' 49"
2	(Colombia) Walter Pedraza	Diquigiovanni–Selle Italia	+ 01' 16"
3	(Venezuela) José Rujano	Unibet.com	+ 01' 44"
4	(South Africa) David George	South Africa	+ 02' 25"
5	(Australia) Jay Crawford	Giant Asia Racing Team	+ 02' 51"
6	(Iran) Ghader Mizbani	Giant Asia Racing Team	+ 03' 00"
7	(France) Yoann Le Boulanger	Bouygues Télécom	+ 03' 21"
8	(Italy) Francesco Bellotti	Crédit Agricole	+ 03' 28"
9	(Japan) Yukihiro Doi	Skil–Shimano	+ 03' 31"
10	(France) Anthony Charteau	Crédit Agricole	+ 03' 36"

=== Stage 9 ===
10 February 2007 — Putrajaya to Seremban, 170.5 km (105.9 mi)

	Rider	Team	Time
1	(Russia) Pavel Brutt	Tinkoff Credit Systems	04h 07' 08"
2	(Russia) Sergey Kolesnikov	Unibet.com	+ 03"
3	(France) Pierre Drancourt	Bouygues Télécom	s.t.
4	(South Africa) David George	South Africa	s.t.
5	(Spain) Luis Pasamontes	Unibet.com	+ 05"
6	(Venezuela) José Rujano	Unibet.com	+ 10"
7	(South Africa) Daryl Impey	South Africa	+ 34"
8	(Australia) Gene Bates	SouthAustralia.com	s/t
9	(Italy) Salvatore Commesso	Tinkoff Credit Systems	s/t
10	(South Korea) Park Sung-Baek	South Korea	s/t

=== Stage 10 ===
11 February 2007 — Kuala Lumpur, 55.9 km (34.7 mi), Criterium

	Rider	Team	Time
1	(Italy) Alberto Loddo	Diquigiovanni–Selle Italia	01h 41' 55"
2	(Russia) Nikolai Trusov	Tinkoff Credit Systems	s.t.
3	(Argentina) Maximiliano Richeze	Ceramica Panaria–Navigare	s.t.
4	(New Zealand) Julian Dean	Crédit Agricole	s.t.
5	(Japan) Takashi Miyazawa	Nippo-Meitan Hompo	s.t.
6	(Malaysia) Ahmad Haidar Anuawar	LeTua Cycling Team	s.t.
7	(Australia) Nicholas Sanderson	SouthAustralia.com–AIS	s.t.
8	(Japan) Masahiro Shinagawa	Skil–Shimano	s.t.
9	(Spain) Luis Pasamontes	Unibet.com	s.t.
10	(South Africa) Daryl Impey	South Africa	s.t.

== List of teams and riders ==
A total of 23 teams were invited to participate in the 2007 Tour de Langkawi. Out of the 136 riders, a total of 102 riders made it to the finish in Kuala Lumpur.

Bouygues Télécom

- (France) Thomas Voeckler
- (France) Pierre Drancourt
- (France) Yoann Le Boulanger
- (France) Laurent Lefèvre
- (France) Franck Rénier
- (France) Didier Rous

Crédit Agricole

- (Italy) Francesco Bellotti
- (Hungary) László Bodrogi
- (France) William Bonnet
- (France) Anthony Charteau
- (New Zealand) Julian Dean
- (France) Benoît Poilvet

Française des Jeux

- (France) Sandy Casar
- (New Zealand) Timothy Gudsell
- (France) Lilian Jégou
- (Sweden) Johan Lindgren
- (South Africa) Ian McLeod
- (France) Fabien Patanchon

AG2R Prévoyance

- (France) Sylvain Calzati
- (Spain) José Luis Arrieta
- (Republic of Ireland) Philip Deignan
- (France) Julien Loubet
- (Spain) David Navas
- (France) Blaise Sonnery

Unibet.com

- (Russia) Alexander Khatuntsev
- (Russia) Sergey Kolesnikov
- (Belgium) Erwin Thijs
- (Spain) Luis Pasamontes
- (Venezuela) José Rujano
- (Belgium) Stijn Vandenbergh

Ceramica Panaria–Navigare

- (Mexico) Julio Alberto Pérez
- (Argentina) Guillermo Bongiorno
- (Argentina) Maximiliano Richeze
- (Ukraine) Sergiy Matveyev
- (Italy) Francesco Tomei
- (Italy) Filippo Savini

Tinkoff Credit Systems

- (Russia) Nikolay Trusov
- (Russia) Sergey Klimov
- (Russia) Pavel Brutt
- (Germany) Steffen Weigold
- (Italy) Elio Aggiano
- (Italy) Salvatore Commesso

Diquigiovanni–Selle Italia

- (Italy) Wladimir Belli
- (Italy) Alberto Loddo
- (Venezuela) Anthony Brea
- (Colombia) José Serpa
- (Colombia) Walter Pedraza
- (Colombia) Fabio Duarte

Slipstream–Chipotle

- (Netherlands) Huub Duyn
- (France) Kilian Patour
- (United States) Brad Huff
- (United States) Michael Creed
- (United States) Timmy Duggan
- (United States) Michael Lange

Vitória–ASC

- (Portugal) Paulo Barroso
- (Portugal) Jose Rodrigues
- (Portugal) Pedro Costa
- (Portugal) Micael Isidoro
- (Portugal) Gilberto Sampaio
- (Malaysia) Ng Yong Li

South Africa

- (South Africa) Daryl Impey
- (South Africa) Johannes Jacobus Kachelhoffer
- (South Africa) Rupert Rheeder
- (South Africa) David George
- (South Africa) Nicholas White
- (South Africa) Tiaan Kannemeyer

Skil–Shimano

- (Japan) Yukihiro Doi
- (Japan) Tomoya Kano
- (Japan) Hidenori Nodera
- (Japan) Yoshiyuki Abe
- (Japan) Yoshimasa Hirose
- (Japan) Masahiro Shinagawa

SouthAustralia.com

- (Australia) Gene Bates
- (Australia) Nicholas Sanderson
- (Australia) Jonathan Clarke
- (Australia) Wesley Sulzberger
- (Australia) William Ford
- (Australia) Shaun Higgerson

Giant Asia Racing Team

- (Chinese Taipei) Lai Kuan Hua
- (Republic of Ireland) Paul Griffin
- (Chinese Taipei) Ching Chon Te
- (Australia) Jai Crawford
- (Iran) Ghader Mizbani
- (Iran) Hossein Askari

Nippo-Meitan Hompo

- (Japan) Yukiya Arashiro
- (Japan) Koji Fukushima
- (Japan) Shinichi Fukushima
- (Japan) Takashi Miyazawa
- (Japan) Miyataka Shimizu
- (Poland) Mariusz Wiesiak

Discovery Channel–Marco Polo

- (Monaco) Jamsran Ulzii-Orshikh
- (Russia) Sergey Kudentsov
- (Netherlands) Thijs Zonneveld
- (China) Xing Yandong
- (Netherlands) Pol Nabben
- (Malaysia) Loh Sea Keong

Hong Kong Pro Cycling

- (Hong Kong) Wong Kam-po
- (Hong Kong) Cheung King Wai
- (Hong Kong) Lam Kai Tsun
- (Hong Kong) Tang Wang Yip
- (Hong Kong) Chan Chun Hing
- (Hong Kong) Wu Kin San

Polygon Sweet Nice

- (Kazakhstan) Yevgeniv Yakovlev
- (Kazakhstan) Vyacheslav Dyadichkin
- (Indonesia) Hari Fitrianto
- (Indonesia) Budi Santoso
- (Indonesia) Herwin Jaya
- (Russia) Artemiy Timofeev

Islamic Azad University Cycling Team

- (Iran) Amir Zargari
- (Iran) Abbas Saeidi Tanha
- (Iran) Moezeddin Seyed-Rezaei
- (Iran) Mostafa Seyed-Rezaei
- (Iran) Sirous Hashemzadeh
- (Iran) Mehdi Faridi

South Korea

- (South Korea) Oh Se-Yong
- (South Korea) Chung Jeong-Seok
- (South Korea) Park Sung-Baek
- (South Korea) Lee Won-Jae
- (South Korea) You Ki-Hong
- (South Korea) Lee San-Jin

Malaysia

- (Malaysia) Suhardi Hassan
- (Malaysia) Mohd Rauf Nur Misbah
- (Malaysia) Safwan Sawai
- (Malaysia) Fallanie Ali
- (Malaysia) Muhammad Fauzan Ahmad Lutfi
- (Malaysia) Mohd Sayuti Mohd Zahit

LeTua Cycling Team

- (Malaysia) Anuar Manan
- (Malaysia) Ahmad Haidar Anuawar
- (Malaysia) Mohd Nur Rizuan Zainal
- (Malaysia) Mohd Nor Umardi Rosdi
- (Indonesia) Tonton Susanto
- (Indonesia) Amin Saryana

MNCF Development

- (Malaysia) Amir Rusli
- (Malaysia) Mohd Jasmin Ruslan
- (Malaysia) Saiful Anuar Abd. Aziz
- (Malaysia) Mohd Faris Abd. Razak
- (Malaysia) Mohamed Harrif Salleh
- (Malaysia) Mohamed Zamri Salleh
