= 2008 Paris–Nice =

Race details
- Dates: 9–16 March 2008
- Stages: 7 & Prologue
- Distance: 1,230 km (760 mi)
- Winning time: 29h 02'48"

Results
Jersey awarded to the overall winner	Winner	Davide Rebellin (ITA)	(Gerolsteiner)
	Second	Rinaldo Nocentini (ITA)	(Ag2r–La Mondiale)
	Third	Yaroslav Popovych (UKR)	(Silence–Lotto)
Jersey awarded to the points classification winner	Points	Thor Hushovd (NOR)	(Crédit Agricole)
Jersey awarded to the mountains classification winner	Mountains	Clément Lhotellerie (FRA)	(Skil–Shimano)
Jersey awarded to the young rider classification winner	Young rider	Robert Gesink (NED)	(Rabobank)
	Team	(Belgium) Quick-Step	

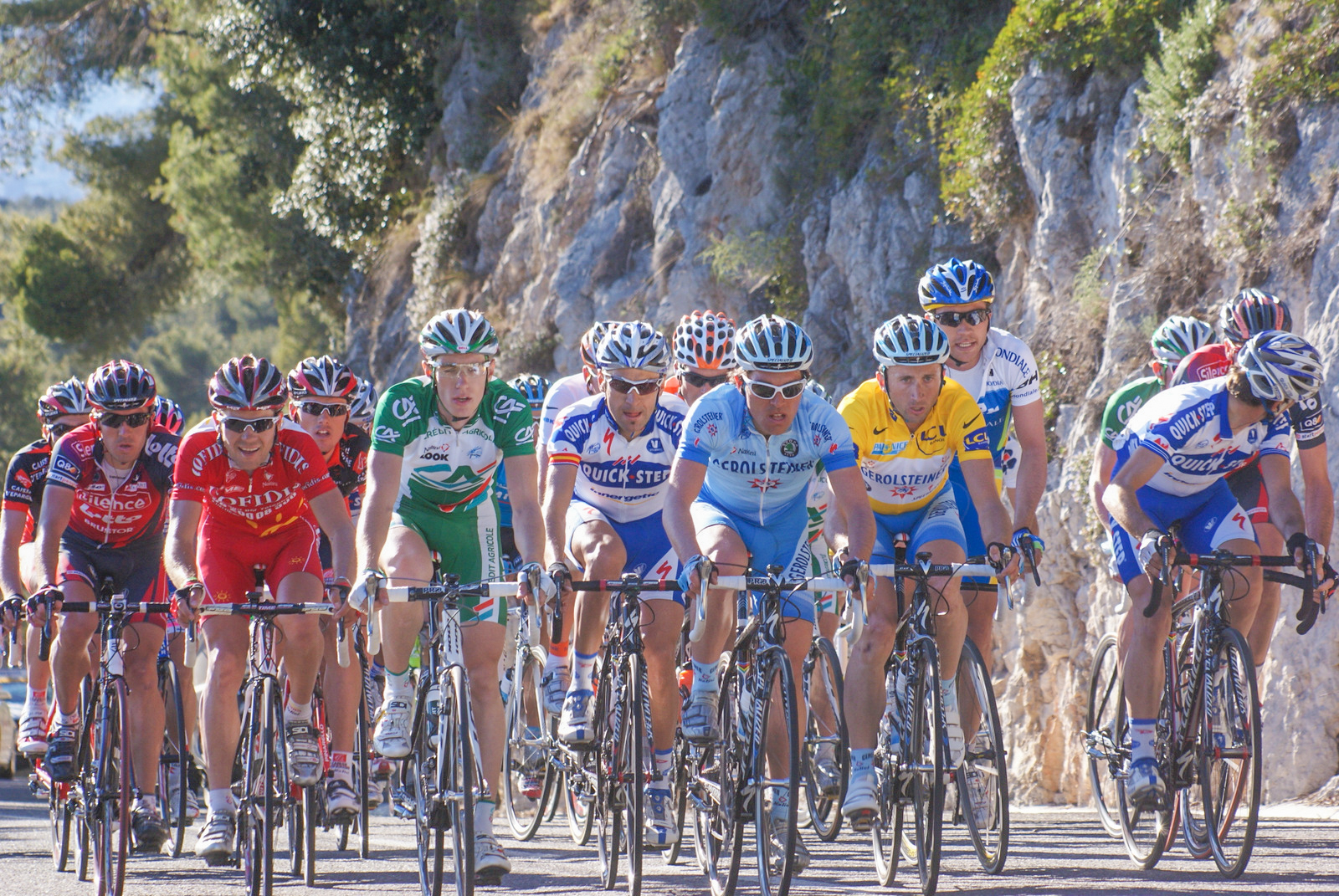
Davide Rebellin, col d'Eze

The 2008 Paris–Nice was the 66th edition of the Paris–Nice cycle race and was held from 9 March to 16 March 2008. The race started in Amilly and finished in Nice. The race was won by Italian Davide Rebellin from Gerolsteiner, who finished second last year. The race started in Amilly and ended in Nice. The 2008 edition returned to the fabled climb of Mont Ventoux, with stage four finishing at the mountain's ski facility, Mont Serein. The Mont Ventoux stage saw a winning break by Cadel Evans and Robert Gesink. Evans took the stage victory as Gesink moved into the overall lead. However, Gesink could not hold on to the lead in stage six when Rebellin attacked on the final descent and took enough time to move into the overall lead.

The event was marked by controversy before the race regarding the ongoing power struggle between ASO and UCI, excluding the race from the UCI ProTour calendar. The race organisers also decided to exclude Astana, the team of the 2007 edition winner Alberto Contador, due to "damage caused by the team during the 2007 Tour de France".

== Teams ==
Each team started the race with eight riders. The following 20 UCI ProTour and UCI Professional Continental teams were selected to the 2008 Paris–Nice:

- Ag2r–La Mondiale
- Agritubel
- Bouygues Télécom
- Caisse d'Epargne
- Cofidis
- Crédit Agricole
- Euskaltel–Euskadi
- Française des Jeux
- Gerolsteiner
- Lampre
- Liquigas
- Quick-Step
- Rabobank
- Saunier Duval–Scott
- Silence–Lotto
- Skil–Shimano
- Slipstream–Chipotle
- Team CSC
- Team High Road
- Team Milram

Astana was the only ProTour team not to be invited to this event because of the "damage caused by the team during the 2007 Tour de France".

== Route ==
Stage characteristics and winners
Stage	Date	Course	Distance	Type	Winner
P	9 March	Amilly	4.6 km (2.9 mi)	Individual time trial	Thor Hushovd (NOR)
1	10 March	La Chapelotte to Nevers	184.5 km (114.6 mi)	Flat stage	Gert Steegmans (BEL)
2	11 March	Nevers to Belleville	201 km (125 mi)	Hilly stage	Gert Steegmans (BEL)
3	12 March	Fleurie to Saint-Étienne	165.5 km (102.8 mi)	Medium mountain stage	Kjell Carlström (FIN)
4	13 March	Montélimar to Mont Ventoux	176 km (109 mi)	Mountain stage	Cadel Evans (AUS)
5	14 March	Althen-des-Paluds to Sisteron	172.5 km (107.2 mi)	Hilly stage	Carlos Barredo (ESP)
6	15 March	Sisteron to Cannes	206 km (128 mi)	Hilly stage	Sylvain Chavanel (FRA)
7	16 March	Nice to Nice	119 km (74 mi)	Mountain stage	Luis León Sánchez (ESP)

== Stages ==
=== Prologue ===
9 March 2008 — Amilly, 4.6 km (2.9 mi) (ITT)

Prologue results

	Cyclist	Team	Time
1	Thor Hushovd (NOR)	Crédit Agricole	5' 28"
2	Markel Irizar (ESP)	Euskaltel–Euskadi	+ 4"
3	Stefan Schumacher (GER)	Gerolsteiner	+ 5"
4	Bradley McGee (AUS)	Team CSC	s.t.
5	William Bonnet (FRA)	Crédit Agricole	+ 6"

General Classification after Prologue

	Cyclist	Team	Time
1	Thor Hushovd (NOR)	Crédit Agricole	5' 28"
2	Markel Irizar (ESP)	Euskaltel–Euskadi	+ 4"
3	Stefan Schumacher (GER)	Gerolsteiner	+ 5"
4	Bradley McGee (AUS)	Team CSC	s.t.
5	William Bonnet (FRA)	Crédit Agricole	+ 6"

=== Stage 1 ===
10 March 2008 — La Chapelotte to Nevers, 93.5 km (58.1 mi)

This stage was originally supposed to start in Amilly, but because of a storm with gale force winds and rain, the route was shortened by 91 km (57 mi) and started in La Chapelotte instead.

Stage 1 results

	Cyclist	Team	Time
1	Gert Steegmans (BEL)	Quick-Step	2h 21' 29"
2	Jérôme Pineau (FRA)	Bouygues Télécom	+ 2"
3	Thor Hushovd (NOR)	Crédit Agricole	s.t.
4	Philippe Gilbert (BEL)	Française des Jeux	s.t.
5	Karsten Kroon (NED)	Team CSC	s.t.

General Classification after Stage 1

	Cyclist	Team	Time
1	Thor Hushovd (NOR)	Crédit Agricole	2h 26' 55"
2	Gert Steegmans (BEL)	Quick-Step	+ 6"
3	Jérôme Pineau (FRA)	Bouygues Télécom	+ 12"
4	Karsten Kroon (NED)	Team CSC	s.t.
5	Andriy Hryvko (UKR)	Team Milram	+ 17"

=== Stage 2 ===
11 March 2008 — Nevers to Belleville, 201 km (125 mi)

Stage 2 results

	Cyclist	Team	Time
1	Gert Steegmans (BEL)	Quick-Step	5h 29' 47"
2	Thor Hushovd (NOR)	Crédit Agricole	s.t.
3	Sylvain Chavanel (FRA)	Cofidis	s.t.
4	Michael Albasini (SUI)	Liquigas	s.t.
5	Philippe Gilbert (BEL)	Française des Jeux	+ 3"

General Classification after Stage 2

	Cyclist	Team	Time
1	Thor Hushovd (NOR)	Crédit Agricole	7h 56' 34"
2	Gert Steegmans (BEL)	Quick-Step	+ 3"
3	Jérôme Pineau (FRA)	Bouygues Télécom	+ 23"
4	Karsten Kroon (NED)	Team CSC	s.t.
5	Trent Lowe (AUS)	Slipstream–Chipotle	+ 29"

=== Stage 3 ===
12 March 2008 — Fleurie to Saint-Étienne, 165.5 km (102.8 mi)

Stage 3 results

	Cyclist	Team	Time
1	Kjell Carlström (FIN)	Liquigas	4h 39' 14"
2	Clément Lhotellerie (FRA)	Skil–Shimano	s.t.
3	Pierre Rolland (FRA)	Crédit Agricole	+ 43"
4	Davide Rebellin (ITA)	Gerolsteiner	s.t.
5	Roman Kreuziger (CZE)	Liquigas	s.t.

General Classification after Stage 3

	Cyclist	Team	Time
1	Sylvain Chavanel (FRA)	Cofidis	12h 37' 01"
2	Luis León Sánchez (ESP)	Caisse d'Epargne	+ 3"
3	Gorka Verdugo (ESP)	Euskaltel–Euskadi	+ 8"
4	Davide Rebellin (ITA)	Gerolsteiner	+ 14"
5	Juan Manuel Gárate (ESP)	Quick-Step	+ 18"

=== Stage 4 ===
13 March 2008 — Montélimar to Mont-Serein, 176 km (109 mi)

Stage 4 results

	Cyclist	Team	Time
1	Cadel Evans (AUS)	Silence–Lotto	4h 32' 56"
2	Robert Gesink (NED)	Rabobank	s.t.
3	Rinaldo Nocentini (ITA)	Ag2r–La Mondiale	+ 33"
4	Davide Rebellin (ITA)	Gerolsteiner	s.t.
5	Fränk Schleck (LUX)	Team CSC	+ 34"

General Classification after Stage 4

	Cyclist	Team	Time
1	Robert Gesink (NED)	Rabobank	17h 10' 12"
2	Davide Rebellin (ITA)	Gerolsteiner	+ 32"
3	Rinaldo Nocentini (ITA)	Ag2r–La Mondiale	+ 35"
4	Yaroslav Popovych (UKR)	Silence–Lotto	+ 42"
5	Juan Manuel Gárate (ESP)	Quick-Step	+ 1' 06"

=== Stage 5 ===
14 March 2008 — Althen-des-Paluds to Sisteron, 172.5 km (107.2 mi)

Stage 5 results

	Cyclist	Team	Time
1	Carlos Barredo (ESP)	Quick-Step	3h 58' 01"
2	Karsten Kroon (NED)	Team CSC	+ 4"
3	Manuele Mori (ITA)	Saunier Duval–Scott	s.t.
4	Christophe Moreau (FRA)	Agritubel	s.t.
5	Pierre Rolland (FRA)	Crédit Agricole	s.t.

General Classification after Stage 5

	Cyclist	Team	Time
1	Robert Gesink (NED)	Rabobank	21h 10' 28"
2	Davide Rebellin (ITA)	Gerolsteiner	+ 32"
3	Rinaldo Nocentini (ITA)	Ag2r–La Mondiale	+ 35"
4	Yaroslav Popovych (UKR)	Silence–Lotto	+ 42"
5	Juan Manuel Gárate (ESP)	Quick-Step	+ 1' 06"

=== Stage 6 ===
15 March 2008 — Sisteron to Cannes, 206 km (128 mi)

Stage 6 results

	Cyclist	Team	Time
1	Sylvain Chavanel (FRA)	Cofidis	5h 00' 25"
2	Luis León Sánchez (ESP)	Caisse d'Epargne	+ 2"
3	Bobby Julich (USA)	Team CSC	s.t.
4	Damiano Cunego (ITA)	Lampre	s.t.
5	Davide Rebellin (ITA)	Gerolsteiner	+ 6"

General Classification after Stage 6

	Cyclist	Team	Time
1	Davide Rebellin (ITA)	Gerolsteiner	26h 11' 31"
2	Rinaldo Nocentini (ITA)	Ag2r–La Mondiale	+ 3"
3	Yaroslav Popovych (UKR)	Silence–Lotto	+ 48"
4	Robert Gesink (NED)	Rabobank	+ 51"
5	Juan Manuel Gárate (ESP)	Quick-Step	+ 1' 12"

=== Stage 7 ===
16 March 2008 — Nice to Nice, 119 km (74 mi)

Stage 7 results

	Cyclist	Team	Time
1	Luis León Sánchez (ESP)	Caisse d'Epargne	2h 51' 12"
2	Maxime Monfort (BEL)	Cofidis	s.t.
3	Carlos Barredo (ESP)	Quick-Step	s.t.
4	Christophe Moreau (FRA)	Agritubel	+ 5"
5	Alexander Efimkin (RUS)	Quick-Step	s.t.

General Classification after Stage 7

	Cyclist	Team	Time
1	Davide Rebellin (ITA)	Gerolsteiner	29h 02' 48"
2	Rinaldo Nocentini (ITA)	Ag2r–La Mondiale	+ 3"
3	Yaroslav Popovych (UKR)	Silence–Lotto	+ 48"
4	Robert Gesink (NED)	Rabobank	+ 51"
5	Luis León Sánchez (ESP)	Caisse d'Epargne	+ 1' 09"

== Final standings ==
=== General classification ===
	Cyclist	Team	Time
1	Davide Rebellin (ITA)	Gerolsteiner	29h 02'48"
2	Rinaldo Nocentini (ITA)	Ag2r–La Mondiale	+3"
3	Yaroslav Popovych (UKR)	Silence–Lotto	+48"
4	Robert Gesink (NED)	Rabobank	+51"
5	Luis León Sánchez (ESP)	Caisse d'Epargne	+1'09"
6	Juan Manuel Gárate (ESP)	Quick-Step	+1'12"
7	Gorka Verdugo (ESP)	Euskaltel–Euskadi	+2'17"
8	Carlos Barredo (ESP)	Quick-Step	+2'24"
9	Sylvain Chavanel (FRA)	Cofidis	+2'39"
10	Alexander Efimkin (RUS)	Quick-Step	+3'21"

== Jersey progress ==
Stage (Winner)	General Classification	Points Classification	Mountains Classification	Young Rider Classification	Team Classification
Prologue (ITT) (Thor Hushovd)	Thor Hushovd	Thor Hushovd	no award	Andriy Hryvko	Crédit Agricole
Stage 1 (Gert Steegmans)	Thor Hushovd	Thor Hushovd	Dionisio Galparsoro	Andriy Hryvko	Quick-Step
Stage 2 (Gert Steegmans)	Thor Hushovd	Thor Hushovd	Thierry Hupond	Trent Lowe	Quick-Step
Stage 3 (Kjell Carlström)	Sylvain Chavanel	Thor Hushovd	Clément Lhotellerie	Luis León Sánchez	Quick-Step
Stage 4 (Cadel Evans)	Robert Gesink	Thor Hushovd	Clément Lhotellerie	Robert Gesink	Quick-Step
Stage 5 (Carlos Barredo)	Robert Gesink	Thor Hushovd	Clément Lhotellerie	Robert Gesink	Quick-Step
Stage 6 (Sylvain Chavanel)	Davide Rebellin	Thor Hushovd	Clément Lhotellerie	Robert Gesink	Quick-Step
Stage 7 (Luis León Sánchez)	Davide Rebellin	Thor Hushovd	Clément Lhotellerie	Robert Gesink	Quick-Step
Final	Davide Rebellin	Thor Hushovd	Clément Lhotellerie	Robert Gesink	Quick-Step

Jersey wearers when one rider is leading two or more competitions

- On stage 1, Markel Irizar wore the green jersey
- On stage 2, Karsten Kroon wore the green jersey
- On stage 3, Gert Steegmans wore the green jersey
- On stages 5 & 6, Luis León Sánchez wore the white jersey

== Withdrawals ==
Only 86 riders finished the race of the 160 that started. Almost 40 riders abandoned during the last stage.

	Stage	Cyclist	Team	Reason
DNF	1	Pierrick Fédrigo (FRA)	Bouygues Télécom	Groin injury due to crash
DNS	2	Óscar Pereiro (ESP)	Caisse d'Epargne	Losing 13:25 on the first stage
DNF	2	Dario Cioni (ITA)	Silence–Lotto	
DNF	2	Beñat Albizuri (ESP)	Euskaltel–Euskadi	
DNF	2	José Ángel Gómez Marchante (ESP)	Saunier Duval–Scott	
DNF	2	Arkaitz Durán (ESP)	Saunier Duval–Scott	
DNS	3	Roy Curvers (NED)	Skil–Shimano	
DNF	3	Mikaël Cherel (FRA)	Française des Jeux	
DNF	3	Christian Knees (GER)	Team Milram	
DNF	3	Robert Wagner (GER)	Skil–Shimano	
DNS	4	Philip Deignan (IRL)	Ag2r–La Mondiale	
DNS	5	Leonardo Bertagnolli (ITA)	Liquigas	
DNS	5	William Bonnet (FRA)	Crédit Agricole	
DNS	5	David Millar (GBR)	Slipstream–Chipotle	Finished 21:07 after Evans, on the 4th stage
DNF	5	Tom Stamsnijder (NED)	Gerolsteiner	
DNF	5	Carlo Westphal (GER)	Gerolsteiner	
DNF	5	Francesco Gavazzi (ITA)	Lampre	
DNF	5	Mario Aerts (BEL)	Silence–Lotto	
DNF	5	Johan Van Summeren (BEL)	Silence–Lotto	
DNF	5	Bradley McGee (AUS)	Team CSC	
DNF	5	Rémy Di Gregorio (FRA)	Française des Jeux	
DNF	5	Stef Clement (NED)	Bouygues Télécom	Injury due to crash
DNF	5	Samuel Dumoulin (FRA)	Cofidis	
DNF	5	Mathew Hayman (AUS)	Rabobank	
DNF	5	Freddy Bichot (FRA)	Agritubel	
DNF	5	Andriy Hryvko (UKR)	Team Milram	
DNF	5	Fumiyuki Beppu (JPN)	Skil–Shimano	
DNF	5	Tom Veelers (NED)	Skil–Shimano	
DNS	6	Sergio Ghisalberti (ITA)	Team Milram	
DNS	6	Simon Gerrans (AUS)	Crédit Agricole	
DNF	6	Albert Timmer (NED)	Skil–Shimano	
DNF	6	Tyler Farrar (USA)	Slipstream–Chipotle	
DNF	6	Eduardo Gonzalo (ESP)	Agritubel	
DNF	6	Matteo Carrara (ITA)	Quick-Step	
DNF	6	Bram Tankink (NED)	Rabobank	
DNF	6	Iouri Trofimov (RUS)	Bouygues Télécom	
DNF	6	Manuele Mori (ITA)	Saunier Duval–Scott	
DNF	6	Jason McCartney (USA)	Team CSC	
DNF	7	Thomas Peterson (USA)	Slipstream–Chipotle	
DNF	7	Markus Eichler (GER)	Team Milram	
DNF	7	Christophe Rinero (FRA)	Agritubel	
DNF	7	Kevin Ista (BEL)	Agritubel	
DNF	7	Kevin Hulsmans (BEL)	Quick-Step	
DNF	7	Gert Steegmans (BEL)	Quick-Step	
DNF	7	Sylvain Calzati (FRA)	Ag2r–La Mondiale	
DNF	7	Juan Antonio Flecha (ESP)	Rabobank	
DNF	7	Michiel Elijzen (NED)	Rabobank	
DNF	7	David Moncoutié (FRA)	Cofidis	
DNF	7	Marcel Sieberg (GER)	Team High Road	
DNF	7	Vicente Reynés (ESP)	Team High Road	
DNF	7	Craig Lewis (USA)	Team High Road	
DNF	7	Servais Knaven (NED)	Team High Road	
DNF	7	Andreas Klier (GER)	Team High Road	
DNF	7	André Greipel (GER)	Team High Road	
DNF	7	Bernhard Eisel (AUT)	Team High Road	
DNF	7	Johann Tschopp (SUI)	Bouygues Télécom	
DNF	7	Matthieu Sprick (FRA)	Bouygues Télécom	
DNF	7	Anthony Geslin (FRA)	Bouygues Télécom	
DNF	7	Juan José Cobo (ESP)	Saunier Duval–Scott	
DNF	7	Jelle Vanendert (BEL)	Française des Jeux	
DNF	7	Lilian Jégou (FRA)	Française des Jeux	
DNF	7	Markel Irizar (ESP)	Euskaltel–Euskadi	
DNF	7	Dionisio Galparsoro (ESP)	Euskaltel–Euskadi	
DNF	7	Lander Aperribai (ESP)	Euskaltel–Euskadi	
DNF	7	Fränk Schleck (LUX)	Team CSC	
DNF	7	Christophe Brandt (BEL)	Silence–Lotto	
DNF	7	Aleksandr Kuschynski (BLR)	Liquigas	
DNF	7	Roman Kreuziger (CZE)	Liquigas	
DNF	7	Enrico Franzoi (ITA)	Liquigas	
DNF	7	Massimiliano Mori (ITA)	Lampre	
DNF	7	Paolo Bossoni (ITA)	Lampre	
DNF	7	Matteo Bono (ITA)	Lampre	
DNF	7	Matthias Russ (GER)	Gerolsteiner	
DNF	7	Andrea Moletta (ITA)	Gerolsteiner	
