= Loddo (surname) =

Loddo is a surname. Notable people with the surname include:

- Alberto Loddo (born 1979), Italian road bicycle racer
- Antonio Loddo (born 1950), Italian politician, journalist, and writer
- Marina Loddo (born 1959), Italian middle-distance and cross-country runner
