= Fothen =

Fothen is a surname. Notable people with the surname include:

- Markus Fothen (born 1981), German cyclist, brother of Thomas
- Thomas Fothen (born 1983), German/ cyclist, brother of Markus
