= 2011 Vuelta a Andalucía =

Race details
- Dates: 20–24 February
- Stages: 5
- Distance: 680.6 km (422.9 mi)
- Winning time: 16h 27' 21"

Results
Jersey awarded to the overall winner	Winner	Markel Irizar (ESP)	(Team RadioShack)
	Second	Jurgen van den Broeck (BEL)	(Omega Pharma–Lotto)
	Third	Levi Leipheimer (USA)	(Team RadioShack)
Jersey awarded to the points classification winner	Points	Óscar Freire (ESP)	(Rabobank)
Jersey awarded to the mountains classification winner	Mountains	Javier Ramirez Abeja (ESP)	(Andalucía–Caja Granada)
Jersey awarded to the sprints classification winner	Sprints	Jan Bakelants (BEL)	(Omega Pharma–Lotto)
	Team	Team RadioShack	

The 57th edition of the 2011 Vuelta a Andalucía is the 16th race of the 2010-2011 UCI Europe Tour. The race started on 20 February and finished on 24 February.

== Teams ==
There are 18 teams taking part in the 2011 Vuelta a Andalucía. Amongst these are nine UCI ProTour teams, six UCI Professional Continental teams, and two Continental teams. Each team was allowed seven riders on their squad, giving the event a peloton of 126 cyclists at its outset.

The 18 teams in the race were:

UCI ProTour Teams

- Rabobank
- Team Sky
- Team Katusha
- Leopard Trek
- Vacansoleil–DCM
- Euskaltel–Euskadi
- Omega Pharma–Lotto
- Team RadioShack
- Movistar Team

UCI Professional Continental Teams

- Caja Rural
- Saur–Sojasun
- Andalucía–Caja Granada
- Skil–Shimano
- Geox–TMC
- Team NetApp

UCI Continental Teams

- KTM–Murcia
- Orbea

== Stages ==
=== Prologue ===
20 February 2011, Benahavís (Prologue) 6.8 km (4.2 mi)

Prologue results and General Classification after Prologue

	Cyclist	Team	Time
1	Jimmy Engoulvent (FRA)	Saur–Sojasun	9' 28"
2	Markel Irizar (ESP)	Team RadioShack	+ 0"
3	Jurgen van den Broeck (BEL)	Omega Pharma–Lotto	+ 1"
4	Levi Leipheimer (USA)	Team RadioShack	+ 2"
5	Jérôme Coppel (FRA)	Saur–Sojasun	+ 3"
6	Paul Poux (FRA)	Saur–Sojasun	+ 7"
7	Luis Pasamontes (ESP)	Movistar Team	+ 8"
8	Thomas Löfkvist (SWE)	Team Sky	+ 8"
9	Rigoberto Urán (COL)	Team Sky	+ 9"
10	Ivan Rovny (RUS)	Team RadioShack	+ 10"

=== Stage 1 ===
21 February 2011 – Almuñécar to Adra, 161.8 km (100.5 mi)

Stage 1 results

	Cyclist	Team	Time
1	Jonathan Hivert (FRA)	Saur–Sojasun	4h 20' 25"
2	Francisco Ventoso (ESP)	Movistar Team	+ 0"
3	Óscar Freire (ESP)	Rabobank	+ 0"
4	Stijn Devolder (BEL)	Vacansoleil–DCM	+ 0"
5	Sergei Ivanov (RUS)	Team Katusha	+ 0"
6	Luis Pasamontes (ESP)	Movistar Team	+ 0"
7	Juan José Cobo (ESP)	Geox–TMC	+ 0"
8	Jurgen van den Broeck (BEL)	Omega Pharma–Lotto	+ 0"
9	José Alberto Benítez (ESP)	Andalucía–Caja Granada	+ 0"
10	Christian Knees (GER)	Team Sky	+ 0"

General Classification after Stage 1

	Cyclist	Team	Time
1	Markel Irizar (ESP)	Team RadioShack	4h 29' 53"
2	Jurgen van den Broeck (BEL)	Omega Pharma–Lotto	+ 1"
3	Levi Leipheimer (USA)	Team RadioShack	+ 2"
4	Jérôme Coppel (FRA)	Saur–Sojasun	+ 3"
5	Luis Pasamontes (ESP)	Movistar Team	+ 8"
6	Thomas Löfkvist (SWE)	Team Sky	+ 8"
7	Rigoberto Urán (COL)	Team Sky	+ 9"
8	Ivan Rovny (RUS)	Team RadioShack	+ 10"
9	Beñat Intxausti (ESP)	Movistar Team	+ 10"
10	Haimar Zubeldia (ESP)	Team RadioShack	+ 12"

=== Stage 2 ===
22 February 2011 – Villa de Otura to Jaén, 175.3 km (108.9 mi)

Stage 2 results

	Cyclist	Team	Time
1	Francisco Ventoso (ESP)	Movistar Team	4h 21' 53"
2	Juan José Lobato (ESP)	Andalucía–Caja Granada	+ 0"
3	Davide Appollonio (ITA)	Team Sky	+ 0"
4	Giacomo Nizzolo (ITA)	Leopard Trek	+ 0"
5	Thierry Hupond (FRA)	Skil–Shimano	+ 0"
6	Pello Bilbao (ESP)	Orbea	+ 0"
7	Samuel Sánchez (ESP)	Euskaltel–Euskadi	+ 0"
8	Ricardo García (ESP)	Orbea	+ 0"
9	Luis Pasamontes (ESP)	Movistar Team	+ 0"
10	Yukihiro Doi (JPN)	Skil–Shimano	+ 0"

General Classification after Stage 2

	Cyclist	Team	Time
1	Markel Irizar (ESP)	Team RadioShack	8h 51' 46"
2	Jurgen van den Broeck (BEL)	Omega Pharma–Lotto	+ 1"
3	Levi Leipheimer (USA)	Team RadioShack	+ 2"
4	Jérôme Coppel (FRA)	Saur–Sojasun	+ 3"
5	Luis Pasamontes (ESP)	Movistar Team	+ 8"
6	Thomas Löfkvist (SWE)	Team Sky	+ 8"
7	Rigoberto Urán (COL)	Team Sky	+ 9"
8	Ivan Rovny (RUS)	Team RadioShack	+ 10"
9	Beñat Intxausti (ESP)	Movistar Team	+ 10"
10	Haimar Zubeldia (ESP)	Team RadioShack	+ 12"

=== Stage 3 ===
23 February 2011 – La Guardia de Jaén to Córdoba, 174 km (108.1 mi)

Stage 3 results

	Cyclist	Team	Time
1	Óscar Freire (ESP)	Rabobank	3h 49' 32"
2	Jimmy Engoulvent (FRA)	Saur–Sojasun	+ 0"
3	Aitor Galdós (ESP)	Caja Rural	+ 0"
4	Marco Marcato (ITA)	Vacansoleil–DCM	+ 0"
5	Robert Hunter (RSA)	Team RadioShack	+ 0"
6	Davide Appollonio (ITA)	Team Sky	+ 0"
7	Yukihiro Doi (JPN)	Skil–Shimano	+ 0"
8	Jon Aberasturi (ESP)	Caja Rural	+ 0"
9	Christian Knees (GER)	Team Sky	+ 0"
10	Mirko Selvaggi (ITA)	Vacansoleil–DCM	+ 0"

General Classification after Stage 3

	Cyclist	Team	Time
1	Markel Irizar (ESP)	Team RadioShack	12h 41' 09"
2	Jurgen van den Broeck (BEL)	Omega Pharma–Lotto	+ 1"
3	Levi Leipheimer (USA)	Team RadioShack	+ 2"
4	Jérôme Coppel (FRA)	Saur–Sojasun	+ 3"
5	Luis Pasamontes (ESP)	Movistar Team	+ 8"
6	Thomas Löfkvist (SWE)	Team Sky	+ 8"
7	Rigoberto Urán (COL)	Team Sky	+ 9"
8	Ivan Rovny (RUS)	Team RadioShack	+ 10"
9	Beñat Intxausti (ESP)	Movistar Team	+ 10"
10	Haimar Zubeldia (ESP)	Team RadioShack	+ 12"

=== Stage 4 ===
24 February 2011 – Córdoba to Antequera, 162.7 km (101.1 mi)

Stage 4 results

	Cyclist	Team	Time
1	Óscar Freire (ESP)	Rabobank	3h 46' 12"
2	Samuel Sánchez (ESP)	Euskaltel–Euskadi	+ 0"
3	Jonathan Hivert (FRA)	Saur–Sojasun	+ 0"
4	Davide Appollonio (ITA)	Team Sky	+ 0"
5	Rigoberto Urán (COL)	Team Sky	+ 0"
6	Marco Marcato (ITA)	Vacansoleil–DCM	+ 0"
7	Jurgen van den Broeck (BEL)	Omega Pharma–Lotto	+ 0"
8	Luis Pasamontes (ESP)	Movistar Team	+ 0"
9	Jérôme Coppel (FRA)	Saur–Sojasun	+ 0"
10	Juan José Lobato (ESP)	Andalucía–Caja Granada	+ 0"

General Classification after Stage 4

	Cyclist	Team	Time
1	Markel Irizar (ESP)	Team RadioShack	16h 27' 21"
2	Jurgen van den Broeck (BEL)	Omega Pharma–Lotto	+ 1"
3	Levi Leipheimer (USA)	Team RadioShack	+ 2"
4	Jérôme Coppel (FRA)	Saur–Sojasun	+ 3"
5	Luis Pasamontes (ESP)	Movistar Team	+ 8"
6	Thomas Löfkvist (SWE)	Team Sky	+ 8"
7	Rigoberto Urán (COL)	Team Sky	+ 9"
8	Haimar Zubeldia (ESP)	Team RadioShack	+ 12"
9	Samuel Sánchez (ESP)	Euskaltel–Euskadi	+ 16"
10	Ivan Rovny (RUS)	Team RadioShack	+ 18"

== Classification leadership ==
In the 2011 Vuelta a Andalucía, four different jerseys were awarded. For the general classification, calculated by adding each cyclist's finishing times on each stage, and allowing time bonuses for the first three finishers on each stage and in intermediate sprints, the leader received a red jersey. This classification was considered the most important of the Vuelta a Andalucía, and the winner is considered the winner of the Vuelta.

Additionally, there was a sprints classification, which awarded a white jersey. In the sprints classification, cyclists got points for finishing in the top three in an intermediate sprint. The first across the sprint points got 3 points, the second got 2, and the third got a single point.

There was also a mountains classification, which awarded a black and white jersey. In the mountains classification, points were won by reaching the top of a mountain before other cyclists. Each climb was categorized, with the more difficult climbs awarding more points.

The points classification awarded a blue jersey. In the points classification, cyclists got points based on the order at the finish line of each stage. The stage win afforded 25 points, second on the stage was worth 20, third 16, fourth 13, fifth 10, sixth 8, seventh 6, eighth 4, ninth 2, and tenth was worth a single point. The points awarded in the sprints classification counted equivalently for this classification.

There was also the combination classification. This was calculated by adding the rankings in the general, points and mountains classifications; the cyclist with the lowest combined ranking was the leader in the combination classification.

There were also two classifications to this race for the best Spanish and Andalucian rider, based on their time in the general classification. However, no jerseys were awarded to the last three classifications, since the UCI limits the amount of rewarded jerseys to four per race.

The race also awarded a teams classification, which, too, was not represented by a jersey. The teams classification was calculated by adding the times of each team's best three riders per stage per day.

Stage	Winner	General Classification	Mountains Classification	Sprints Classification	Points Classification	Combination Classification	Best Andalusian Rider Classification	Best Spanish Rider Classification	Teams Classification
P	Jimmy Engoulvent	Jimmy Engoulvent	not awarded	not awarded	Jimmy Engoulvent	Jimmy Engoulvent	Javier Moreno	Markel Irizar	Saur–Sojasun
1	Jonathan Hivert	Markel Irizar	Javier Ramirez Abeja	Fabio Duarte	Jonathan Hivert	Jurgen Van den Broeck	Antonio Piedra	Markel Irizar	Team RadioShack
2	Francisco Ventoso	Markel Irizar	Javier Ramirez Abeja	Fabio Duarte	Francisco Ventoso	Jurgen Van den Broeck	Antonio Piedra	Markel Irizar	Team RadioShack
3	Óscar Freire	Markel Irizar	Javier Ramirez Abeja	Fabio Duarte	Jimmy Engoulvent	Jurgen Van den Broeck	Antonio Piedra	Markel Irizar	Team RadioShack
4	Óscar Freire	Markel Irizar	Javier Ramirez Abeja	Jan Bakelants	Óscar Freire	Jurgen Van den Broeck	José Alberto Benítez	Markel Irizar	Team RadioShack
Final		Markel Irizar	Javier Ramirez Abeja	Jan Bakelants	Óscar Freire	Jurgen Van den Broeck	José Alberto Benítez	Markel Irizar	Team RadioShack
