= 2007 Eindhoven Team Time Trial =

Dutch road cycling race

The third edition of the Eindhoven Team Time Trial took place on June 24, 2007. It featured a team time trial in and around the Dutch city of Eindhoven. Former winners Gerolsteiner and Team CSC were expected to be amongst the favourites for the win.

Team CSC, led by United States national time trial champion David Zabriskie, won their second Eindhoven Team Time Trial in succession, clocked 0.43 seconds faster than wild card team Tinkoff Credit Systems.

== Results ==
=== 24-06-2007: Eindhoven, 48.6 km. (TTT) ===
	Team	Country	Ranked Riders	Time
1	Team CSC	Denmark	Michael Blaudzun, Matthew Goss, Bobby Julich, Marcus Ljungqvist, Luke Roberts, Christian Vande Velde, David Zabriskie	53:36.75
2	Tinkoff Credit Systems	Italy	Pavel Brutt, Mikhail Ignatiev, Vasil Kiryienka, Serguei Klimov, Evgeni Petrov, Ivan Rovny, Alexander Serov, Nikolai Trussov	+0:00.43
3	Team Milram	Italy	Alessandro Cortinovis, Volodymyr Dyudya, Andriy Hryvko, Christian Knees, Brett Lancaster, Martin Müller, Marcel Sieberg, Niki Terpstra	+0:12.38
4	Discovery Channel Pro Cycling Team	United States	Steve Cummings, George Hincapie, Fuyu Li, Egoi Martínez, Benjamín Noval, Sérgio Paulinho, Yaroslav Popovych, Tomas Vaitkus	+0:24.31
5	Liquigas	Italy	Magnus Bäckstedt, Mauro Da Dalto, Roman Kreuziger, Aleksandr Kuschynski, Vincenzo Nibali, Roberto Petito, Manuel Quinziato, Frederik Willems	+0:30.25
