= 2012 Volta Limburg Classic =

2012 Hel van het Mergelland
Race details
- Dates: 31 March 2012
- Stages: 1
- Distance: 196 km (121.8 mi)
- Winning time: 5h 02' 00"

Results
| | Winner | Pavel Brutt (RUS) |
| | Second | Simon Geschke (GER) |
| | Third | Daniel Schorn (AUT) |

The 2012 Volta Limburg Classic was the 39th edition of the Volta Limburg Classic cycle race and was held on 31 March 2012. The race started and finished in Eijsden. The race was won by Pavel Brutt.

== General classification ==
Final general classification

| Rank | Rider | Time |
|---|---|---|
| 1 | Pavel Brutt (RUS) | 5h 02' 00" |
| 2 | Simon Geschke (GER) | + 0" |
| 3 | Daniel Schorn (AUT) | + 0" |
| 4 | Pieter Serry (BEL) | + 4" |
| 5 | Marc de Maar (CUR) | + 5" |
| 6 | Rüdiger Selig (GER) | + 5" |
| 7 | Pim Ligthart (NED) | + 8" |
| 8 | Alexey Tsatevich (RUS) | + 8" |
| 9 | Sacha Modolo (ITA) | + 8" |
| 10 | Rafaâ Chtioui (TUN) | + 8" |
