= Amin Saryana =

Indonesian cyclist (born 1997)

Personal information
- Full name: Amin Saryana
- Born: June 13, 1977 (age 49) Jakarta, Indonesia

Cycling career
- Sport: Cycling
- Discipline: Road
- Role: Rider

Professional team
- 2007–2008: LeTua Cycling Team

Amin Saryana (born June 13, 1977) is an Indonesian former professional racing cyclist.

== Major results ==
2004
2nd Overall Tour d'Indonesia

1st Stage 1
