= Yukihiro Doi =

Japanese professional racing cyclist

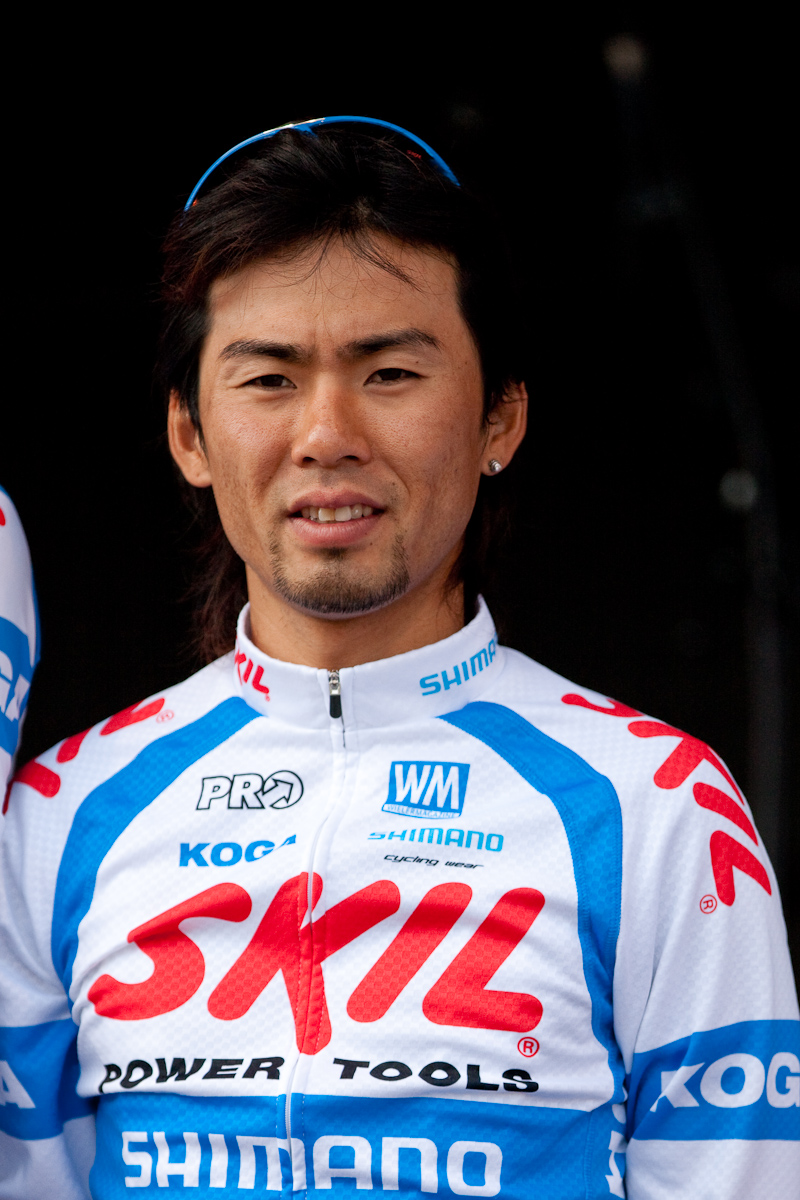
- Doi at the 2009 Eschborn-Frankfurt City Loop.

Personal information
- Full name: Yukihiro Doi; Japanese: 土井 雪広
- Born: 18 September 1983 (age 43) Yamagata Prefecture, Japan
- Height: 1.69 m (5 ft 6 1/2 in)
- Weight: 58 kg (128 lb; 9.1 st)

Cycling career
- Sport: Cycling
- Current team: Retired
- Discipline: Road
- Role: Rider

Professional teams
- 2004: Shimano Racing
- 2005–2012: Shimano–Memory Corp
- 2013–2015: Team UKYO
- 2016–2018: Matrix Powertag

Major wins
- National Road Race Championships (2012)

Yukihiro Doi (土井 雪広, Doi Yukihiro; born 18 September 1983, in Yamagata Prefecture) is a Japanese former professional racing cyclist, who rode professionally between 2004 and 2018.

After graduating from Hosei University, he joined the Shimano Racing team in 2004. After that, Doi mostly raced abroad, finishing second in the Tour of Siam (2007), eighth in the Tour de Langkawi (2007), fifth in the Tour de Hokkaido (2007), and sixth in the Tour of Turkey (2010). In 2011, he became the first Japanese to compete in the Vuelta a España, finishing in 150th place. In 2012, he won the Japanese National Road Race Championships. In November 2012, it was announced that in 2013 he would be riding for Team UKYO, a cycling team run by the racing driver Ukyo Katayama.

== Major results ==
2007
2nd Overall Tour of Siam
5th Overall Tour de Hokkaido
8th Overall Tour de Langkawi
9th Japan Cup
2008
1st Stage 1b (TTT) Brixia Tour
9th Japan Cup
2010
6th Overall Presidential Cycling Tour of Turkey
8th Overall Tour of Hainan
2012
1st Road race, National Road Championships
2013
4th Overall Tour de East Java
5th Overall Tour de Kumano
8th Road race, National Road Championships
2014
National Road Championships

5th Road race
9th Time trial

10th Overall Tour of Iran
2015
6th Overall Tour de Taiwan
8th Time trial, National Road Championships
2016
9th Road race, National Road Championships
