= Ivan Rovny =

Russian road bicycle racer

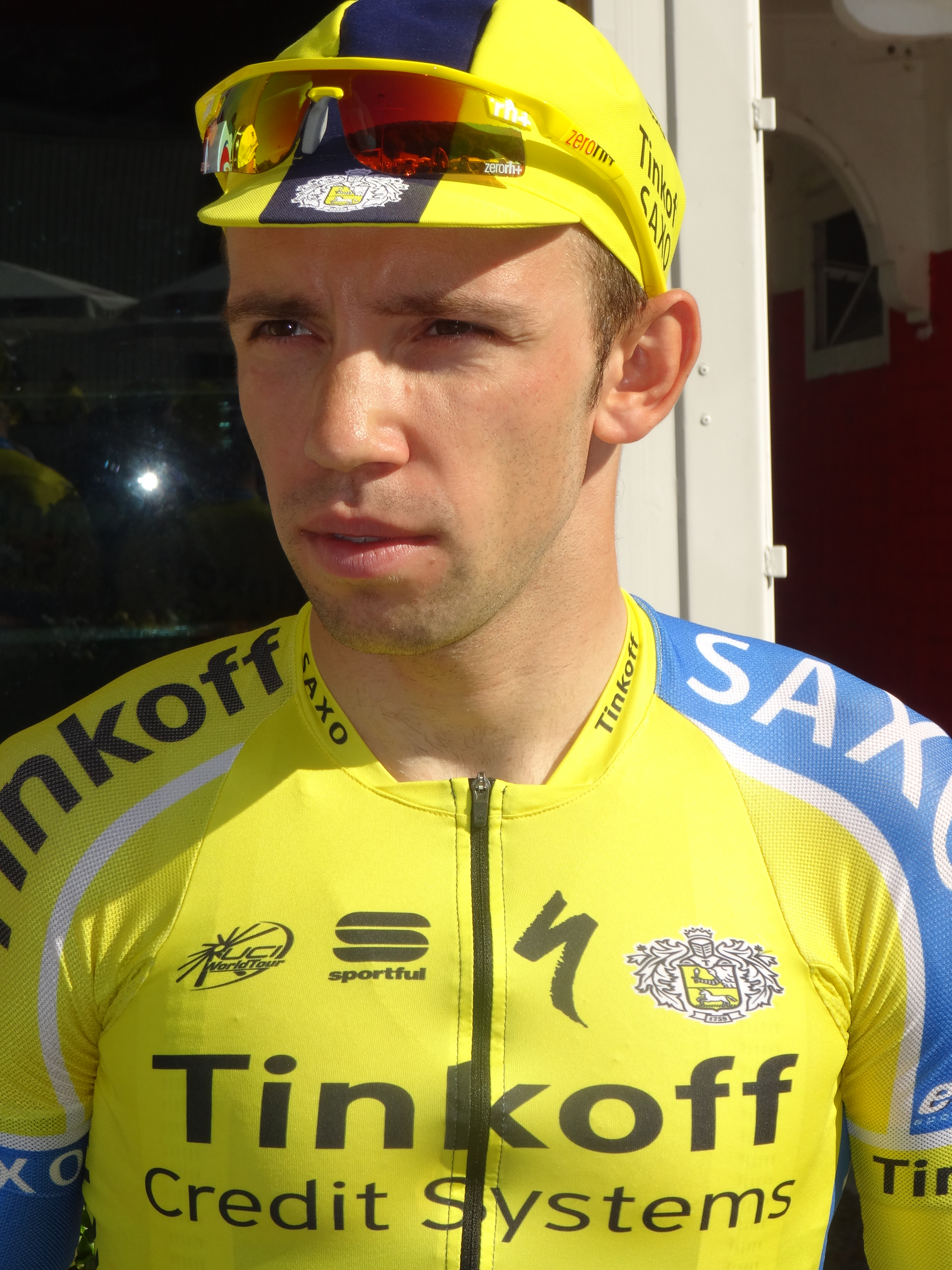
- Rovny in 2014

Personal information
- Full name: Ivan Andreyevich Rovny; Иван Андреевич Ровный
- Born: 30 September 1987 (age 39): Leningrad, Soviet Union; (now Saint Petersburg, Russia)
- Height: 1.73 m (5 ft 8 in)
- Weight: 64 kg (141 lb)

Cycling career
- Sport: Cycling
- Current team: Retired
- Discipline: Road
- Role: Rider
- Rider type: Climbing specialist

Professional teams
- 2006–2008: Tinkoff Restaurants
- 2009: Team Katusha
- 2010–2011: Team RadioShack
- 2012: RusVelo
- 2013: Ceramica Flaminia–Fondriest
- 2014–2016: Tinkoff–Saxo
- 2017–2022: Gazprom–RusVelo

Major wins
- One-day races and Classics National Road Race Championships (2018)

Ivan Andreyevich Rovny (Иван Андреевич Ровный; born 30 September 1987) is a Russian former professional road bicycle racer, who competed as a professional from 2006 to 2022.

== Career ==
For the 2014 season, Leningrad-born Rovny joined Tinkoff–Saxo. He was disqualified from the 2014 Vuelta a España for fighting with Italian cyclist Gianluca Brambilla on a breakaway on stage 16. In August 2016 Gazprom–RusVelo announced that Rovny would rejoin the team on an initial two-year contract from the following season, having previously ridden for the team in 2012.

== Major results ==
2004
9th Road race, UCI Junior Road World Championships
2005
1st Road race, UCI Junior Road World Championships
1st Road race, UEC European Junior Road Championships
3rd Individual pursuit, UEC European Junior Track Championships
2006
1st Team pursuit, 2005–06 UCI Track Cycling World Cup Classics, Carson
Team pursuit, 2006–07 UCI Track Cycling World Cup Classics

1st Sydney
2nd Moscow

1st Points race, UEC European Under-23 Track Championships
5th Overall Cinturón a Mallorca
8th Grand Prix of Moscow
9th Paris–Mantes-en-Yvelines
2007
1st Stage 9 Tour de l'Avenir
2nd Eindhoven Team Time Trial
5th Overall Tour Méditerranéen
5th Coppa Ugo Agostoni
8th Gran Premio Città di Camaiore
10th Trofeo Melinda
2009
3rd Grand Prix d'Isbergues
2011
10th Overall Vuelta a Andalucía
2012
8th Circuito de Getxo
10th Rund um Köln
2013
2nd Giro di Toscana
3rd Overall Giro della Regione Friuli Venezia Giulia
3rd Giro dell'Appennino
4th GP Industria & Artigianato di Larciano
4th Tre Valli Varesine
5th Coppa Ugo Agostoni
6th Trofeo Matteotti
2018
1st Road race, National Road Championships
9th Coppa Ugo Agostoni
10th Overall Tour of Norway
2019
10th Giro della Toscana
2021
3rd Road race, National Road Championships

=== Grand Tour general classification results timeline ===
Grand Tour	2007	2008	2009	2010	2011	2012	2013	2014	2015	2016	2017
Giro d'Italia	DNF	—	—	—	78	—	—	46	115	36	119
Tour de France	Has not contested during his career										
Vuelta a España	—	DNF	—	—	—	—	—	DNF	—	99	—

Legend
—	Did not compete
DNF	Did not finish
