= Elio Aggiano =

Italian cyclist

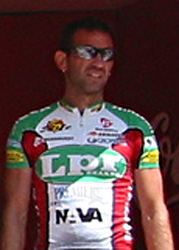

Personal information
- Born: 15 March 1972 (age 54) Brindisi, Italy

Cycling career
- Sport: Cycling
- Current team: Retired
- Discipline: Road
- Role: Rider

Amateur team
- 1993–1995: ASD Monsummanese

Professional teams
- 1997: Refin–Mobilvetta
- 1998–2000: Vitalicio Seguros
- 2001–2002: Mapei–Quick-Step
- 2003: Formaggi Pinzolo Fiavè
- 2004–2006: LPR–Piacenza
- 2007: Tinkoff Credit Systems

Elio Aggiano (born 15 March 1972 in Brindisi) is an Italian former racing cyclist, who competed as a professional from 1997 to 2007.

== Career ==
For his final season as a professional cyclist Aggiano joined newly formed Russian-Italian Tinkoff Credit Systems.

== Major results ==
1991
1st Gran Premio Sportivi Poggio alla Cavalla
2nd Gran Premio La Torre
1992
1st Trofeo Paolin Fornero
1st Coppa Collecchio
1st Targa Crocifisso
1993
1st Gran Premio Sportivi Poggio alla Cavalla
1st Coppa Cicogna
1st Gran Premio Comune di Cerreto Guidi
3rd Coppa Giulio Burci
1994
1st G.P. Città di Vinci
1995
1st Milano-Busseto
2nd Milano-Tortona
1996
1st Trofeo Franco Balestra
1st Trofeo Caduti a Soprazocco
1st Coppa Penna
2nd GP Citta di Diano Marina
3rd Trofeo Adolfo Leoni
3rd Giro del Valdarno
7th Giro delle Tre Province
8th Gran Premio Bruno Beghelli
1997
2nd Nice–Alassio
4th Grand Prix La Marseillaise
5th Arnhem–Veenendaal Classic
6th Giro del Lago Maggiore
8th Overall Étoile de Bessèges
1998
1st Trofeo Manacor
1st Trofeo Luis Ocana
5th Classic Haribo
1999
1st Stage 3 Vuelta a Castilla y León
1st Stage 3 Vuelta a Galicia
10th Trofeo Palma
2000
1st Trofeo Calvià
5th Trofeo Soller
7th Clásica de Sabiñánigo
2001
1st GP de Beauce
8th Giro della Provincia di Siracusa
2002
1st Stage 1 (TTT) Settimana Internazionale di Coppi e Bartali
1st Stage 3 Uniqa Classic
1st Stage 4 Danmark Rundt
4th Overall Giro della Provincia di Lucca
4th Brabantse Pijl
7th Overall Tour du Poitou-Charentes

1st Stage 5

2003
1st Stage 3 Giro del Trentino
1st Mountains classification, Tirreno–Adriatico
4th Overall Tour of Qinghai Lake
2004
1st Mountains classification, Giro del Trentino
4th Gran Premio della Costa Etruschi
2005
1st Stage 6 Settimana Internazionale di Coppi e Bartali
3rd Trofeo Città di Castelfidardo
2006
1st Stage 7 Tour de Langkawi

=== Grand Tour general classification results timeline ===
Grand Tour	1997	1998	1999	2000	2001	2002	2003	2004	2005	2006	2007
Giro d'Italia	DNF	DNF	—	81	—	—	DNF	—	—	—	138
Tour de France	—	—	92	—	—	—	—	—	—	—	—
/ Vuelta a España	123	DNF	—	—	DNF	DNF	—	—	—	—	—

Legend
—	Did not compete
DNF	Did not finish
