= Luis Pasamontes =

Spanish cyclist

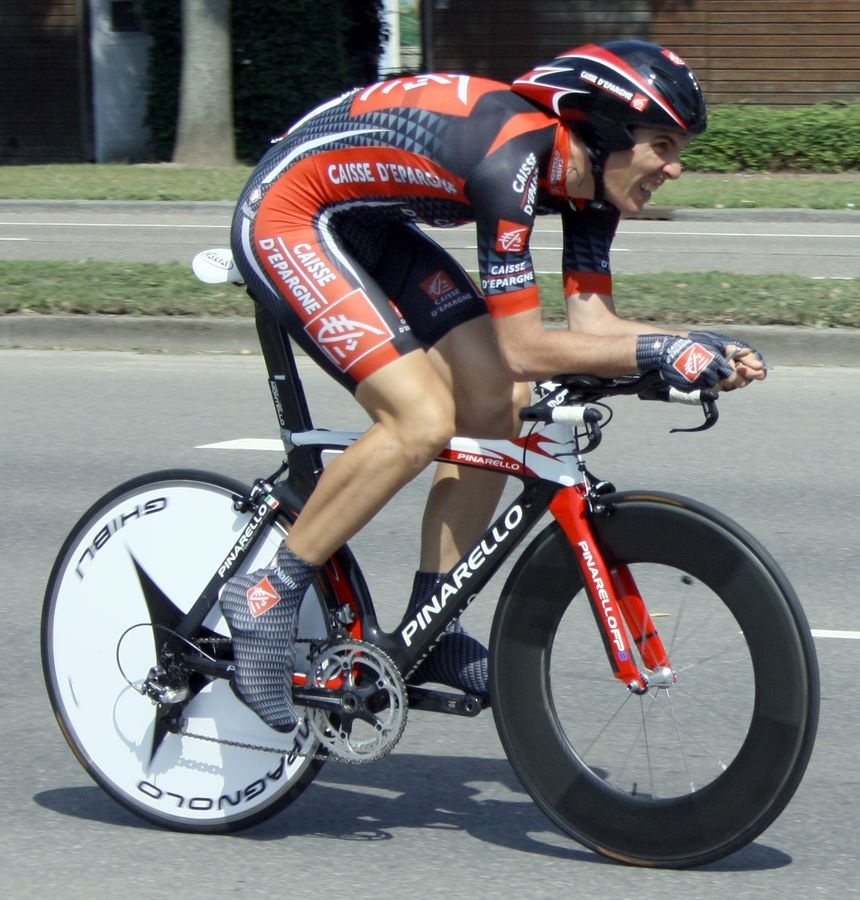
- Pasamontes at the 2009 Eneco Tour

Personal information
- Full name: Luis Pasamontes Rodriguez
- Born: October 2, 1979 (age 47) Cangas del Narcea, Spain
- Height: 1.86 m (6 ft 1 in)
- Weight: 72 kg (159 lb)

Cycling career
- Sport: Cycling
- Current team: Retired
- Discipline: Road
- Role: Rider

Amateur team
- 2002: Alcosto–Fuenlabrada

Professional teams
- 2003–2005: Colchon Relax–Fuenlabrada
- 2006–2007: Unibet.com
- 2008–2011: Caisse d'Epargne
- 2012: Movistar Continental Team

Luis Pasamontes Rodriguez (born 2 October 1979 in Cangas del Narcea) is a Spanish former professional racing cyclist, who last rode for the Movistar Continental Team.

== Major results ==
2003
8th Trofeo Calvià
2004
1st Memorial Manuel Galera
5th Trofeo Luis Puig
9th Trofeo Manacor
2005
6th Subida a Urkiola
7th Overall Vuelta a Asturias
2006
2nd Overall Tour of Britain
5th Overall Vuelta a Andalucía
2007
Tour de Wallonie

1st Mountains classification
1st Sprints classification
1st Stage 1

1st Mountains classification, Volta a Catalunya
8th Overall Vuelta a Andalucía
9th Overall Tour de Langkawi
2008
5th Overall Tour de l'Ain
7th Overall Vuelta a La Rioja
2009
7th Overall Four Days of Dunkirk
2010
10th Overall Vuelta a la Comunidad de Madrid
2011
5th Overall Vuelta a Andalucía
5th Overall Vuelta a Asturias
2012
8th Overall Vuelta del Uruguay

=== Grand Tour general classification results timeline ===
Grand Tour	2004	2005	2006	2007	2008	2009	2010	2011
Giro d'Italia	—	—	—	—	36	—	—	51
Tour de France	—	—	—	—	—	39	—	—
/ Vuelta a España	20	29	—	—	35	—	47	—

Legend
—	Did not compete
DNF	Did not finish
