= Mostafa Seyed-Rezaei =

Iranian cyclist

Personal information
- Full name: Mostafa Seyed-Rezaei Khormizi
- Born: June 6, 1984 (age 42) Sanandaj, Iran

Cycling career
- Sport: Cycling
- Current team: Free agent
- Discipline: Road
- Role: Rider

Professional teams
- 2007-2008: Azad University Giant Team
- 2010-2011: Vali Asr Kerman
- 2014: Pishgaman Yazd

Mostafa Seyed-Rezaei Khormizi (born June 6, 1984) is an Iranian cyclist.

== Palmares ==
2004
2nd Tour d'Azerbaïdjan
2005
1st stage 7 Tour d'Azerbaïdjan
2006
3rd Tour d'Indonesia
2008
1st stage 1 Kerman Tour
