= Alberto Loddo =

Italian cyclist

Personal information
- Full name: Alberto Loddo
- Born: 5 January 1979 (age 47) Cagliari, Italy

Cycling career
- Sport: Cycling
- Discipline: Road
- Role: Rider
- Rider type: Sprinter

Professional teams
- 2002–2003: Lampre
- 2004: Saunier Duval–Prodir
- 2006–2007: Serramenti PVC Diquigiovanni–Selle Italia
- 2008: Tinkoff Credit Systems
- 2009–2010: Serramenti PVC Diquigiovanni–Androni Giocattoli

Major wins
- Tour of Qatar Overall (2003) 3 stages Le Tour de Langkawi 6 stages Points Classification (2007)

Alberto Loddo (born 5 January 1979, in Cagliari) is an Italian former professional road bicycle racer.

== Palmares ==
2001
1st Trofeo Franco Balestra
1st Gran Premio della Liberazione
2002
1st Stage 4 Tour of Qatar
2003
1st Overall Tour of Qatar

1st Points classification
1st Young rider classification
1st Stage 1

1st Stage 2 Volta ao Algarve
2004
4th Wachovia Classic
2006
Vuelta Ciclista Por Un Chile Lider

1st Points classification
1st Stages 4, 7, 8a & 10

Circuit Cycliste de la Sarthe

1st Points classification
1st Stage 3

1st Stage 4 Vuelta al Táchira
2007
Tour de Langkawi

1st Points classification
1st Stages 1, 4, 5, 6 & 10

1st Stage 1 Vuelta al Táchira
1st Stage 1 Vuelta Ciclista a la Rioja
1st Stage 2 Vuelta a Asturias
2008
1st Stage 5 Tour de Langkawi
1st Stage 1 Settimana Ciclista Lombarda (TTT)
8th Overall Tour of Qatar

1st Stage 4

2009
Vuelta a Venezuela

1st Stages 1 & 2

2010
Tour de San Luis

1st Stages 3 & 7

1st Stage 5 Giro di Sardegna
