= Steve Zampieri =

Swiss cyclist (born 1977)

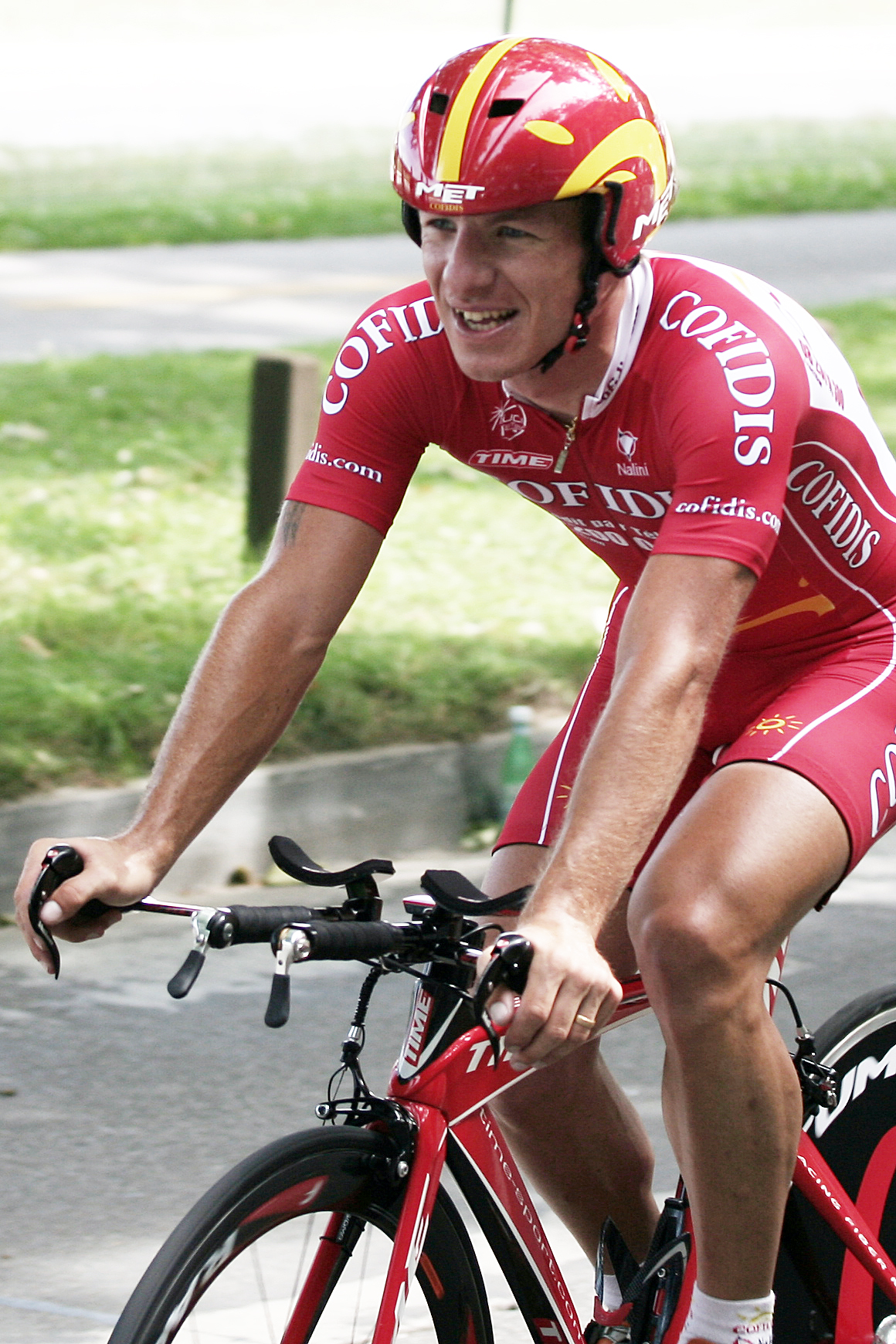
- Zampieri in the 2007 Tour de Suisse

Personal information
- Full name: Steve Zampieri
- Born: 4 June 1977 (age 49) Arbon, Switzerland
- Height: 1.70 m (5 ft 7 in)
- Weight: 62 kg (137 lb)

Cycling career
- Sport: Cycling
- Discipline: Road
- Role: Rider
- Rider type: Climber

Professional teams
- 2000: Mercury
- 2001: Post Swiss Team
- 2002–2004: Tacconi Sport
- 2005–2006: Phonak
- 2007–2008: Cofidis

Steve Zampieri (born 4 June 1977 in Arbon) is a Swiss former professional road bicycle racer. His sporting career began with VC Littoral.

== Major results ==
2000
1st Prix d'Armorique
1st Overall Another Dam Race

1st Stage 1

2001
1st National Hill-Climb Championships
1st Tour du Lac Léman
1st GP Lausanne
4th Tour du Jura
2002
1st Mountains classification, Tour de Suisse
2003
3rd Overall Settimana Ciclista Lombarda
4th Stausee Rundfahrt
2004
1st National Hill-Climb Championships
10th Overall Tour de Romandie
2005
9th GP du canton d'Argovie
2006
1st National Hill-Climb Championships
5th Road race, National Road Championships

=== Grand Tour general classification results timeline ===
Grand Tour	2002	2003	2004	2005	2006	2007	2008
Giro d'Italia	89	35	19	30	48	DNF	DNF
Tour de France	—	87	—	DNF	—	—	—
Vuelta a España	—	—	DNF	—	DNF	—	—
