= Ian McLeod (cyclist) =

South African cyclist

Personal information
- Full name: Ian McLeod
- Born: 3 October 1980 (age 46) Falkirk, United Kingdom
- Height: 1.77 m (5 ft 10 in)
- Weight: 66 kg (146 lb)

Cycling career
- Sport: Cycling
- Current team: FedGroup ITEC
- Discipline: Road
- Role: Rider

Amateur teams
- 2011: DCM
- 2013–: FedGroup ITEC

Professional teams
- 2001–2004: Team HSBC
- 2005–2007: Française des Jeux
- 2008–2010: Team MTN
- 2012: Team Bonitas

Ian McLeod (born 3 October 1980 in Falkirk, United Kingdom) is a South African professional road bicycle racer for FedGroup ITEC. He has previously been a member of Team Bonitas, as well as Française des Jeux and Team MTN. In 2008 he won the South African National Road Race Championships.

== Palmarès ==
2002
1st Liberty Ride for Sight
2003
1st Pick 'n Pay 94.7
2004
1st GP des Lys lez Lannoy
1st Hluhluwe Pineapple Festival
1st Stage 1 Tour de la Manche
2nd Hyper to Hyper
2007
3rd Anatomic Jock Race
3rd Pick 'n Pay 94.7
2008
1st Wilro 100
1st National Road Race Championships
3rd Overall Tour du Maroc
2009
1st African Road Race Championships
2010
2nd Overall La Tropicale Amissa Bongo
2013
4th Overall Mzansi Tour
