= Pierre Drancourt =

French cyclist

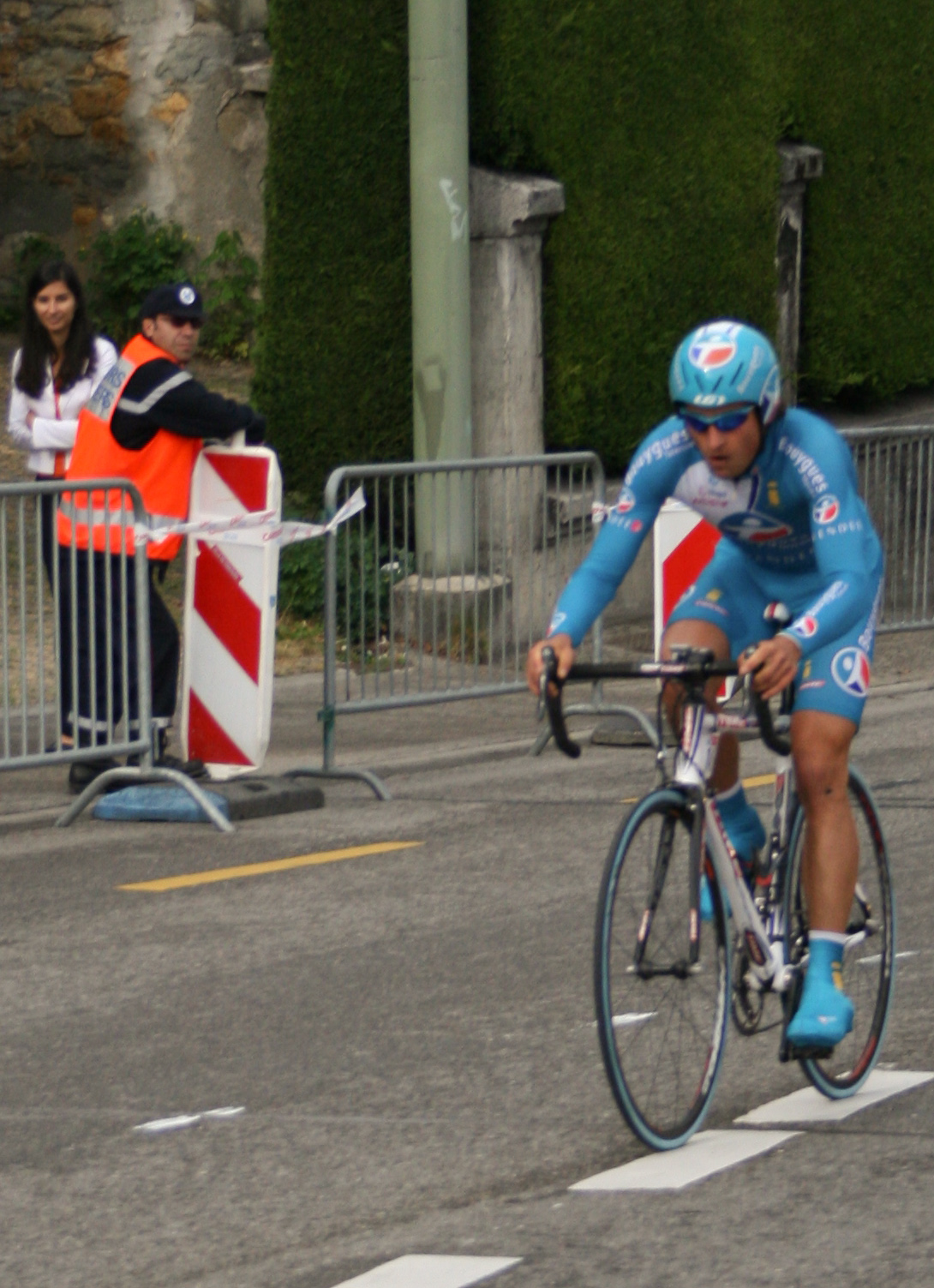
- Drancourt at the 2007 Tour de Romandie

Personal information
- Full name: Pierre Drancourt
- Born: 10 May 1982 (age 44) Maubeuge, France
- Height: 1.75 m (5 ft 9 in)
- Weight: 67 kg (148 lb)

Cycling career
- Sport: Cycling
- Current team: ESEG Douai
- Discipline: Road
- Role: Rider

Amateur teams
- 2003: Crédit Agricole Espoirs
- 2009–2011: ESEG Douai
- 2013–: ESEG Douai

Professional teams
- 2005–2007: Bouygues Télécom
- 2008: Groupe Gobert.com
- 2012: Roubaix–Lille Métropole

Pierre Drancourt (born 10 May 1982) is a French road bicycle racer for ESEG Douai, a French amateur team.

== Professional teams ==
He has previously competed for professional teams Bouygues Télécom, Groupe Gobert.com, and Roubaix–Lille Métropole.

== Major results ==
2013
2nd GP Ville de Pérenchies
