= Pavel Brutt =

Russian cyclist

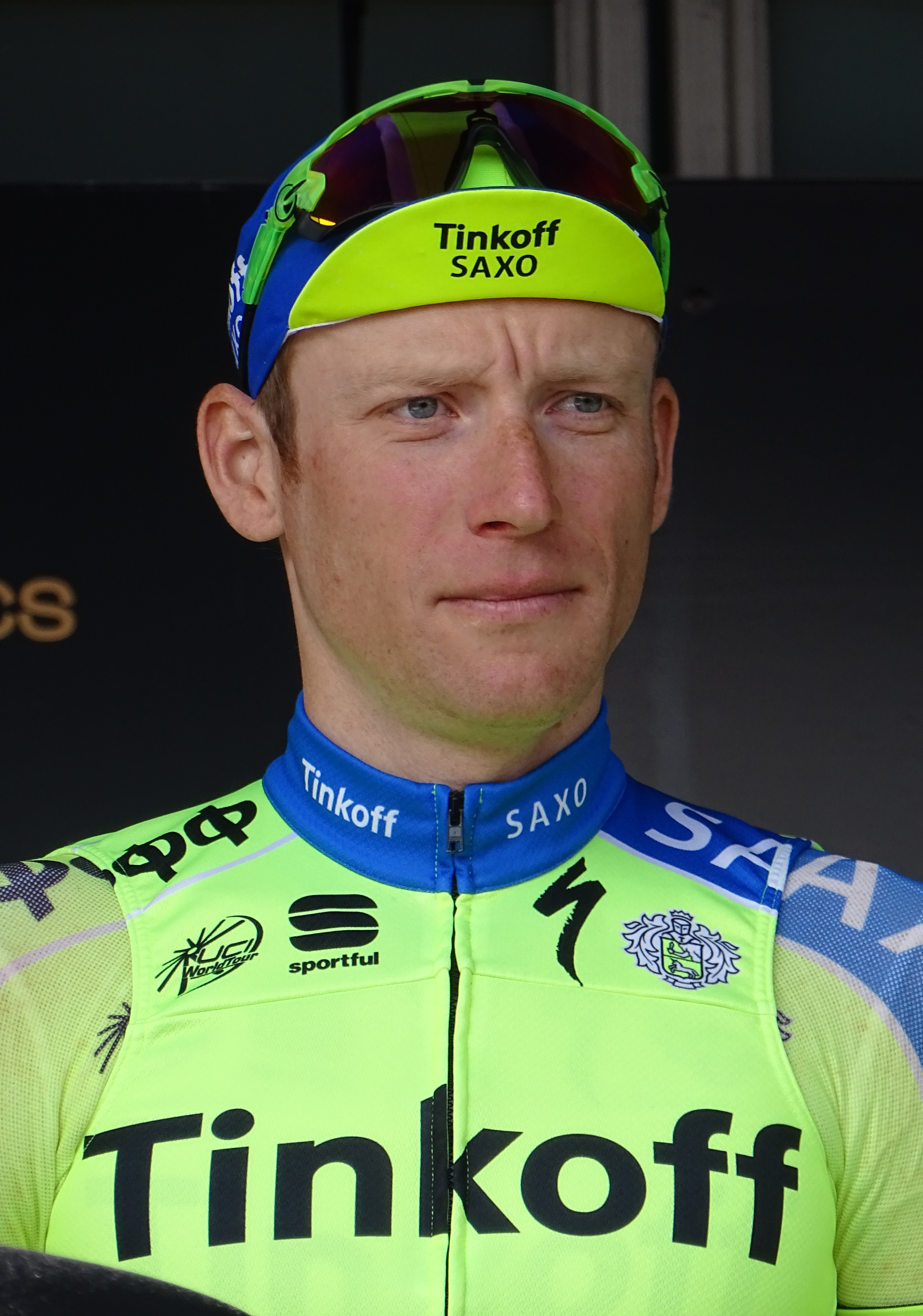
- Brutt at the 2015 Scheldeprijs

Personal information
- Full name: Pavel Aleksandrovich Brutt; Павел Александрович Брутт
- Born: 29 January 1982 (age 44): Sosnovy Bor, Leningrad Oblast, Soviet Union; (now Russia)
- Height: 1.78 m (5 ft 10 in)
- Weight: 68 kg (150 lb; 10.7 st)

Cycling career
- Sport: Cycling
- Current team: Retired
- Disciplines: Road; Track
- Role: Rider
- Rider type: All-rounder

Professional teams
- 2001–2002: Itera
- 2003–2005: Lokomotiv
- 2006–2008: Tinkoff Restaurants
- 2009–2014: Team Katusha
- 2015–2016: Tinkoff–Saxo
- 2017: Gazprom–RusVelo

Major wins
- Grand Tours Giro d'Italia 1 individual stage (2008) One-day races and Classics National Road Race Championships (2011)

Pavel Aleksandrovich Brutt (Russian: Павел Александрович Брутт; born 29 January 1982) is a Russian former professional track and road bicycle racer, who rode professionally between 2001 and 2017 for six different teams.

== Career ==
Born in Sosnovy Bor, Leningrad Oblast, Brutt's biggest win of his career was stage 5 in the 2008 Giro d'Italia. He also won the Russian National Road Race Championships in 2011. In August 2014 Tinkoff–Saxo announced that Brutt would join them for the 2015 season.

== Major results ==
2000
6th Road race, UCI Junior Road World Championships
2001
1st Stage 1 Vuelta al Táchira
1st Stage 2 Circuito Montañés
5th Overall International Tour of Rhodes
9th Overall Vuelta a Venezuela

1st Young rider classification
1st Stage 11

2002
2nd Circuito de Getxo
2004
4th Overall Circuito Montañés

1st Points classification
1st Stage 2

2005
1st Overall Vuelta a Navarra

1st Points classification
1st Stage 5b (ITT)

2nd Overall Volta a Lleida
4th Overall Vuelta a Extremadura

1st Stage 3b (ITT)

5th Subida a Urkiola
6th Overall Circuito Montañés
2006
1st Overall Cinturón a Mallorca

1st Stage 5

1st Overall Tour of Greece

1st Stage 2

Circuito Montañés

1st Mountains classification
1st Stage 5

2nd Overall Vuelta a Navarra
3rd Overall Tour de Bretagne
3rd Overall Volta a Lleida

1st Stage 3

4th Paris–Mantes-en-Yvelines
8th Overall Five Rings of Moscow
10th Overall Vuelta a la Comunidad de Madrid
2007
1st Gran Premio di Chiasso
2nd Eindhoven Team Time Trial
4th Memorial Cimurri
5th Gran Premio Città di Camaiore
7th Overall Tour de Langkawi

1st Stage 9

7th Giro del Veneto
2008
1st Stage 5 Giro d'Italia
9th Monte Paschi Eroica
2009
1st Tour de Vendée
2nd Overall Tour de Wallonie
5th Giro del Veneto
2011
1st Road race, National Road Championships
1st Classica Sarda
2nd Giro del Friuli
5th Trofeo Laigueglia
8th Overall Giro di Sardegna
8th Overall Tour de Romandie

1st Stage 1

2012
1st Volta Limburg Classic
3rd Road race, National Road Championships
4th Rund um Köln
2014
5th Road race, National Road Championships
2015
National Road Championships

2nd Road race
3rd Time trial

2016
2nd Time trial, National Road Championships

=== Grand Tour general classification results timeline ===
Grand Tour	2007	2008	2009	2010	2011	2012	2013	2014	2015	2016	2017
Giro d'Italia	87	DNF	125	—	128	95	103	—	—	90	134
Tour de France	—	—	—	102	DNF	—	110	—	—	—	—
Vuelta a España	—	105	—	—	—	106	—	—	101	—	—

Legend
—	Did not compete
DNF	Did not finish
