= Lander Aperribai =

Spanish cyclist

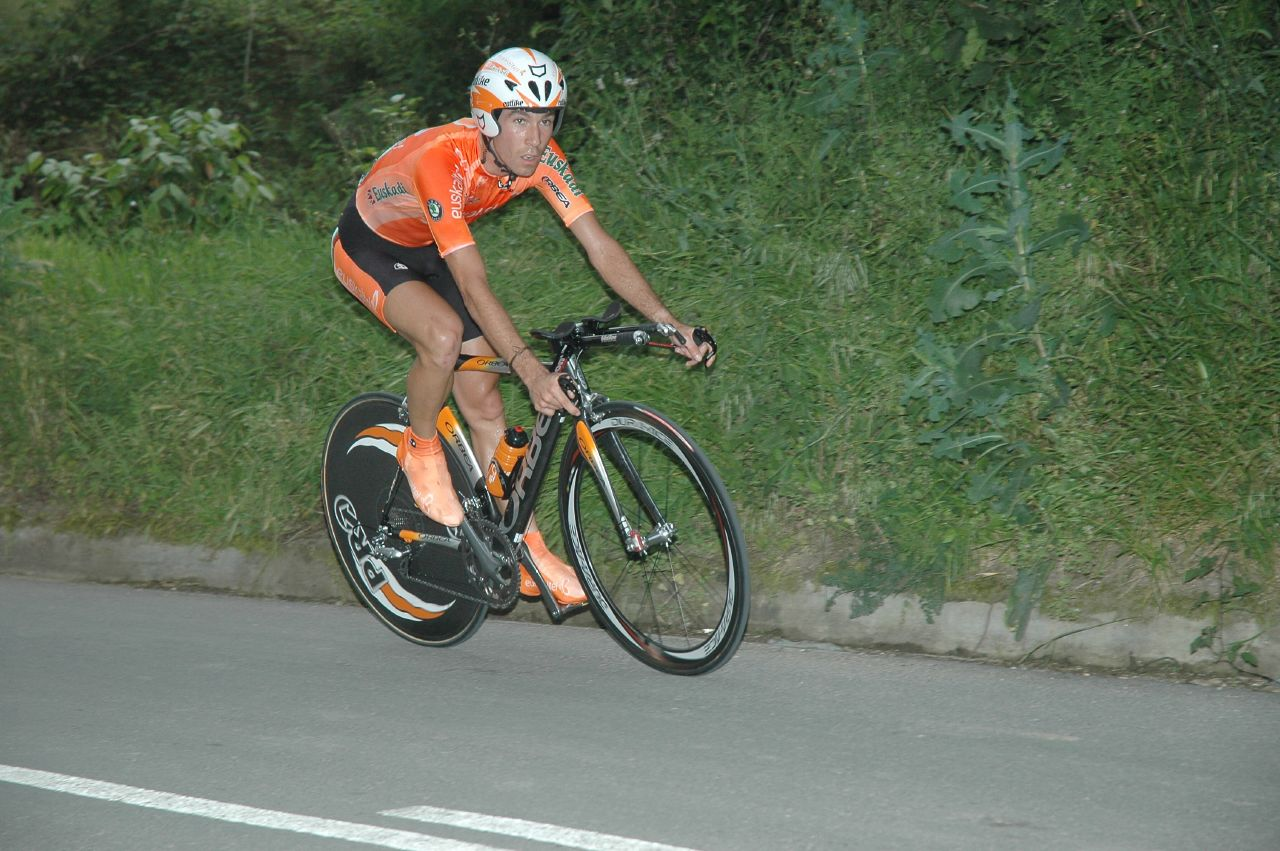

Personal information
- Full name: Lander Aperribai Aranda
- Born: 15 June 1982 (age 44) San Sebastián, Spain

Cycling career
- Sport: Cycling
- Current team: Retired
- Discipline: Road
- Role: Rider

Professional team
- 2007–2008: Euskaltel–Euskadi

Lander Aperribai Aranda (born 15 June 1982 in San Sebastián, Basque Country) is a Spanish former professional road bicycle racer, who rode professionally in 2007 and 2008 for the Euskaltel–Euskadi team.

== Biography ==
He turned pro in 2007 with the Euskaltel–Euskadi (1994–2013) team.

== Major results ==
2004
1st Stage 3 Vuelta al Goierri
