= Yoann Le Boulanger =

French cyclist (born 1975)

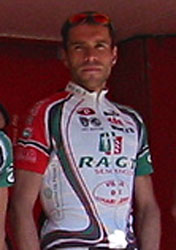

Personal information
- Full name: Yoann Le Boulanger
- Born: 4 November 1975 (age 50) Guingamp, France
- Height: 1.85 m (6 ft 1 in)
- Weight: 70 kg (150 lb)

Cycling career
- Sport: Cycling
- Discipline: Road
- Role: Rider

Professional teams
- 2000–2001: Cofidis
- 2003: MBK-Oktos
- 2004–2005: R.A.G.T. Semences
- 2006–2007: Bouygues Télécom
- 2008: Française des Jeux
- 2009: Agritubel

Major wins
- Tour du Doubs (2006)

Yoann Le Boulanger (born 4 November 1975 in Guingamp, Côtes-d'Armor) is a French former professional road bicycle racer. His sporting career began with Roue d`Or Begarroise.

== Major results ==
- Tour du Doubs (2006)
- 2007 Tour de Pologne - Mountains Classification
- Tour de la Somme - 1 stage (2003)
- Tour de l'Avenir - 1 stage (1999)
