= Dionisio Galparsoro =

Spanish cyclist

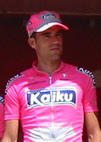

Personal information
- Full name: Dionisio Galparsoro Martínez
- Born: 13 August 1978 (age 48) Ataun, Spain

Cycling career
- Sport: Cycling
- Discipline: Road
- Role: Rider

Professional teams
- 2003–2004: Euskaltel–Euskadi
- 2005–2006: Kaiku
- 2007–2008: Euskaltel–Euskadi

Dionisio Galparsoro Martínez (born 13 August 1978 in Ataun) is a Spanish racing cyclist formerly with UCI ProTeam Euskaltel–Euskadi.

== Major results ==
2004
5th Overall Vuelta Ciclista a la Rioja
5th Overall Vuelta a Castilla y León
2005
1st Stage 4 Vuelta a Asturias
Hessen Rundfahrt

1st Points Classification
1st Stage 3

6th Clásica de Almería
8th Gran Premio Miguel Indurain
2006
6th Subida Urkiola
6th Subida al Naranco
10th Clásica de Almería
2007
4th Overall Vuelta Ciclista a la Rioja
2008
6th GP Llodio
