= Markel Irizar =

Spanish road bicycle racer

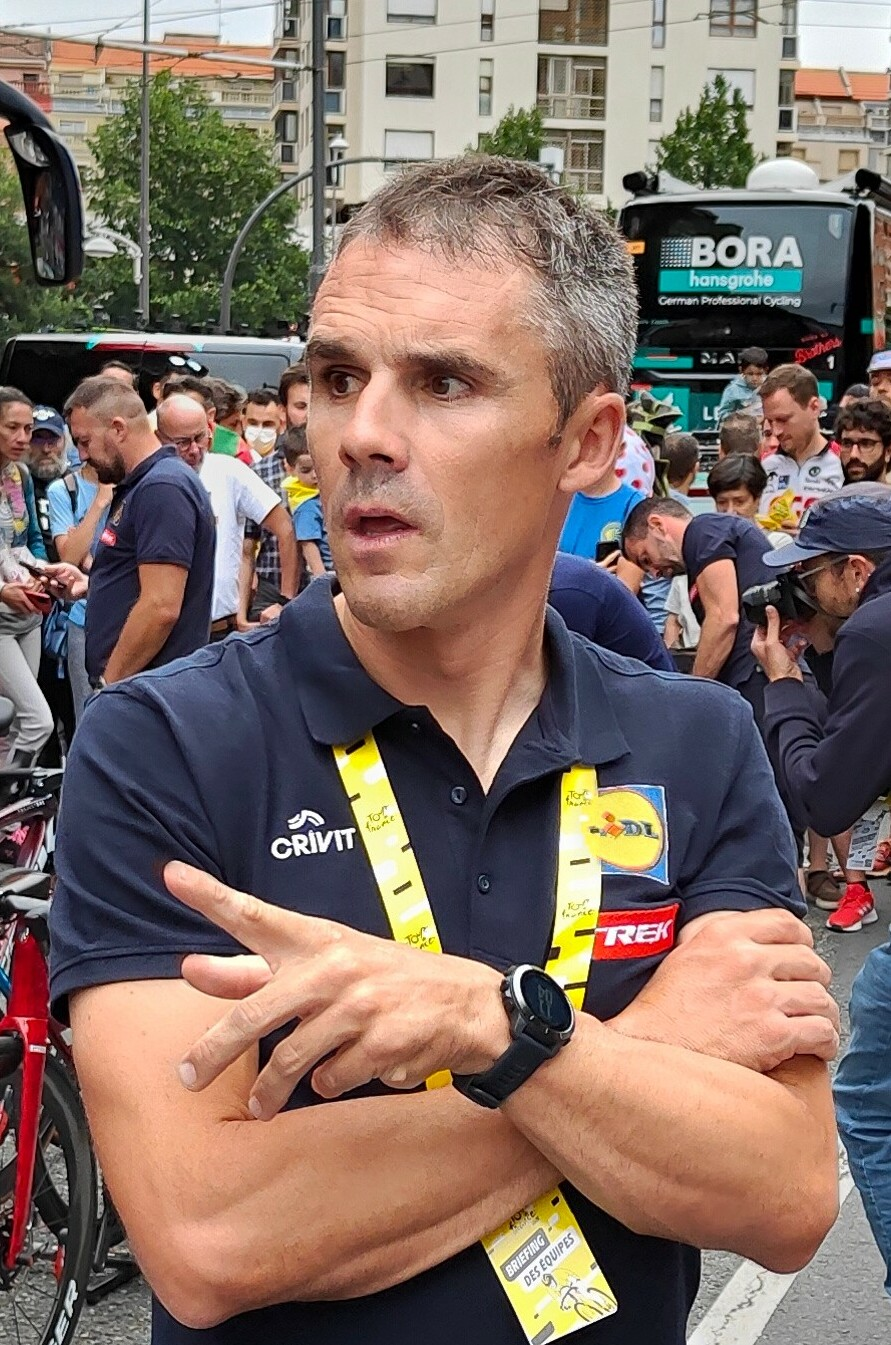
- Irizar at the 2023 Tour de France

Personal information
- Full name: Markel Irizar Aranburu
- Born: 5 February 1980 (age 46) Oñati, Basque Country, Spain
- Height: 1.82 m (6 ft 0 in)
- Weight: 76 kg (168 lb)

Cycling career
- Sport: Cycling
- Current team: Lidl–Trek (men); Lidl–Trek (women); Lidl–Trek Development Team
- Discipline: Road
- Role: Rider (retired); Directeur sportif; General manager
- Rider type: All-rounder

Professional teams
- 2004–2009: Euskaltel–Euskadi
- 2010–2011: Team RadioShack
- 2012–2019: RadioShack–Nissan

Managerial teams
- 2020–: Trek–Segafredo (men; directeur sportif)
- 2020–: Trek–Segafredo (women; directeur sportif)
- 2024–: Lidl–Trek Development Team (general manager)

Markel Irizar Aranburu (born 5 February 1980) is a Spanish former professional road racing cyclist, who rode professionally between 2004 and 2019 for the Euskaltel–Euskadi, Team RadioShack and Trek–Segafredo teams. During his professional career, Irizar took two victories – a stage win at the 2010 Tour du Poitou-Charentes and the general classification at the 2011 Vuelta a Andalucía.

Following his retirement from riding in August 2019, Irizar has worked as a directeur sportif for both the men's and women's Lidl–Trek WorldTeams, and from 2024, works as the general manager for the Lidl–Trek Development Team.

== Personal life ==
Born in Oñati, Basque Country, Irizar resided in Arrasate, Basque Country, Spain, as of 2014. Irizar was diagnosed and treated for testicular cancer in 2002.

== Major results ==
2009
1st Mountains classification, Tour Down Under
2010
5th Overall Tour du Poitou-Charentes

1st Stage 4

5th Chrono des Nations
2011
1st Overall Vuelta a Andalucía
10th Chrono des Nations
2012
9th Overall Three Days of De Panne
2017
Combativity award Stage 2 Vuelta a España

=== Grand Tour general classification results timeline ===
Grand Tour	2005	2006	2007	2008	2009	2010	2011	2012	2013	2014	2015	2016	2017	2018	2019
Giro d'Italia	—	90	68	74	—	—	—	—	—	—	—	—	—	134	136
Tour de France	—	—	—	—	—	—	83	—	103	63	93	120	135	—	—
Vuelta a España	DNF	94	—	—	114	—	96	93	86	—	89	DNF	119	130	—

Legend
—	Did not compete
DNF	Did not finish
