= Thomas Fothen =

German cyclist (born 1983)

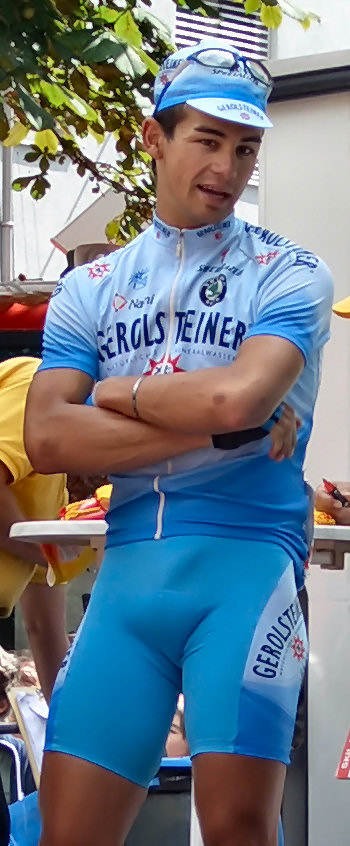

Personal information
- Full name: Thomas Fothen
- Born: 6 April 1983 (age 43) Neuss, Germany

Cycling career
- Sport: Cycling
- Current team: Retired
- Discipline: Road
- Role: Rider
- Rider type: Sprinter

Amateur team
- 2004: Teag Köstritzer

Professional teams
- 2005: Team Sparkasse
- 2006–2008: Gerolsteiner
- 2009–2010: Team Milram
- 2011: Team NSP

Thomas Fothen (born 6 April 1983 in Neuss) is a German former professional racing cyclist. He is the younger brother of Markus Fothen. He rode in three editions of the Giro d'Italia.

== Major results ==
2001
1st Road race, National Junior Road Championships
2nd Overall Trofeo Karlsberg

1st Stage 4

2002
1st Team pursuit, National Track Championships
2006
3rd Eindhoven Team Time Trial
4th Sparkassen Münsterland Giro
7th Rund um die Nürnberger Altstadt
2008
10th Rund um die Nürnberger Altstadt
2010
9th GP de Denain
