= Tinkoff Credit Systems (cycling team) =

Team information
- UCI code: TCS
- Registered: Italy
- Founded: 2007
- Disbanded: 2008
- Discipline: Road
- Status: Professional Continental

Key personnel
- General manager: Stefano Feltrin
- Team manager: Omar Piscina

Team name history
Jersey

Tinkoff Credit Systems (UCI team code: TCS) was a professional continental cycling team based in Italy that had UCI Professional Continental status, raced in UCI Continental Circuits races and when selected as a wildcard to UCI ProTour events. The team was financed by Russian businessman Oleg Tinkov.

Tinkoff Credit Systems emerged from the 2006 Continental team Tinkoff Restaurants, which was based in Russia and headed by Alexander Kuznetsov (Александр Кузнецов), employed Russian cyclists and was based upon the Saint Petersburg Lokomotiv team. Of the eleven cyclists employed by the team, eight moved on to Tinkoff Credit Systems: Pavel Brutt, Ilya Chernetskiy, Mikhail Ignatiev, Serguei Klimov, Anton Mindlin, Ivan Rovny, Alexander Serov and Nikolai Trusov.

In January 2007, the Italian Ambassador to Russia Vittorio Surdo supported the formation of the Russian-Italian team Tinkoff Credit Systems explaining "for Italians, cycling is sacred, since the Prime Minister of Italy is an avid cyclist."

Stefano Feltrin was the general manager of Tinkoff, while Omar Piscina was team manager, assisted by Orlando Maini, Dmitri Konychev and Claudio Cozzi. Owner Oleg Tinkoff had worked hard to build links with the Italian cycling community, which garnered wildcard invites to the major RCS races, including the 2007 Giro d'Italia.

The team was disbanded in 2008, with the new Team Katusha formed as a UCI ProTour team in its place, and using Tinkoff Credit Systems structure.

Tinkoff used Colnago bicycles with Campagnolo components.

After the 2013 Tour de France, Oleg Tinkov announced he was ending his sponsorship of Saxo–Tinkoff in favour of reviving Tinkoff Credit Systems from January 2014, with a commitment for five years. However, in December 2013 Tinkov confirmed that he had bought Team Saxo-Tinkoff from Bjarne Riis and that the team would compete in 2014 under the name Tinkoff-Saxo with Riis remaining as the team's general manager.

== Major wins ==
2008
Stage 19 Giro d'Italia, Vasil Kiryienka
Stage 5 Giro d'Italia, Pavel Brutt

2007
Team classification, Tirreno–Adriatico
Mountains classification, Tirreno–Adriatico, Salvatore Commesso
Gran Premio di Chiasso, Pavel Brutt
Trofeo Laigueglia, Mikhail Ignatiev
Young rider classification, Tour Méditerranéen, Ivan Rovny
Stage 3 Tour Méditerranéen: Mikhail Ignatiev
Stage 9 Tour de Langkawi, Pavel Brutt
Stage 1 Tour de Georgia: Daniele Contrini
