= 1999 Vuelta a Castilla y León =

Race details
- Dates: 1–5 August 1999
- Stages: 5
- Distance: 861.4 km (535.2 mi)
- Winning time: 21h 43' 28"

Results
	Winner	Leonardo Piepoli (ITA)
	Second	Alberto Elli (ITA)
	Third	Giuseppe Guerini (ITA)

The 1999 Vuelta a Castilla y León was the 14th edition of the Vuelta a Castilla y León cycle race and was held on 1 August to 5 August 1999. The race started in Valladolid and finished in Grajera. The race was won by Leonardo Piepoli.

== Teams ==
Fifteen teams of up to eight riders started the race:

- Banesto
- Team Telekom
- Vitalicio Seguros
- TVM–Farm Frites
- ONCE–Deutsche Bank
- U.S. Postal Service
- Kelme–Costa Blanca
- Amore & Vita–Giubileo 2000–Beretta
- Euskaltel–Euskadi
- Amica Chips–Costa de Almeria
- Fuenlabrada
- Post Swiss Team
- Palmans–Ideal
- Ipso Euroclean
- home–Jack & Jones

== General classification ==
Final general classification

Rank	Rider	Time
1	Leonardo Piepoli (ITA)	21h 43' 28"
2	Alberto Elli (ITA)	+ 1' 25"
3	Giuseppe Guerini (ITA)	+ 2' 34"
4	Aitor Osa (ESP)	+ 2' 48"
5	Francisco Tomás García (ESP)	+ 3' 07"
6	Dave Bruylandts (BEL)	+ 3' 13"
7	Georg Totschnig (AUT)	+ 3' 43"
8	Carlos Sastre (ESP)	+ 4' 02"
9	Francisco Mancebo (ESP)	+ 4' 17"
10	Christian Charriere (SUI)	+ 4' 44"
