= Vuelta a Asturias =

Spanish multi-day road cycling race

Vuelta Asturias

Race details
- Date: Early-May
- Region: Asturias, Spain
- English name: Tour of Asturias
- Local name: Vuelta Asturias (in Spanish)
- Discipline: Road
- Competition: UCI Europe Tour
- Type: Stage-race
- Organiser: Club Ciclista Aramo
- Web site: www.lavueltaasturias.com

History
- First edition: 1925
- Editions: 68 (as of 2026)
- First winner: Segundo Barruetabeña (ESP)
- Most wins: Nairo Quintana (COL) (3 wins)
- Most recent: Nairo Quintana (COL)

Vuelta Asturias is a professional cycle road race held in Spain in early May each year. The event was first run in 1925 but has not been held consistently until 1968 to present. Since 2005, the race has been organised as a 2.1 event on the UCI Europe Tour.

The race director from 1957 to 2007 was Julio Álvarez "Mendo". After his death on 23 February 2008, the race director is his daughter Cristina Álvarez "Mendo", the first woman in Spain, and the second in Europe, to become director of a professional men's road cycling race. She continues to be the director of the race, as of 2026.

On 25 April 2014, the Vuelta Asturias was suspended one week before its start due to the lack of funds and sponsors. The race returned in 2015, when a two-stage edition was won by Igor Antón (Movistar Team).

== Winners ==
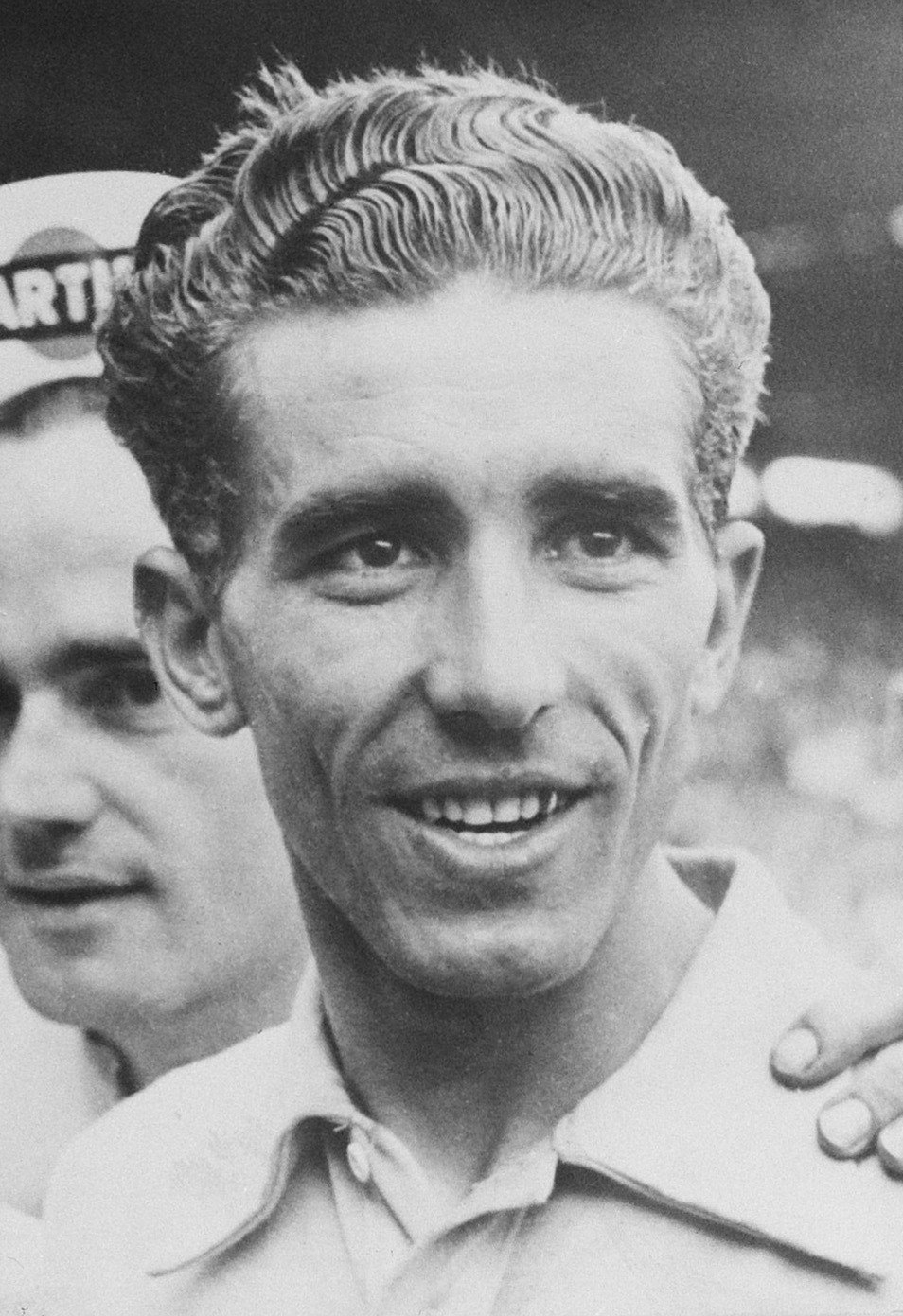
Federico Bahamontes won the tour in 1955 and 1957.

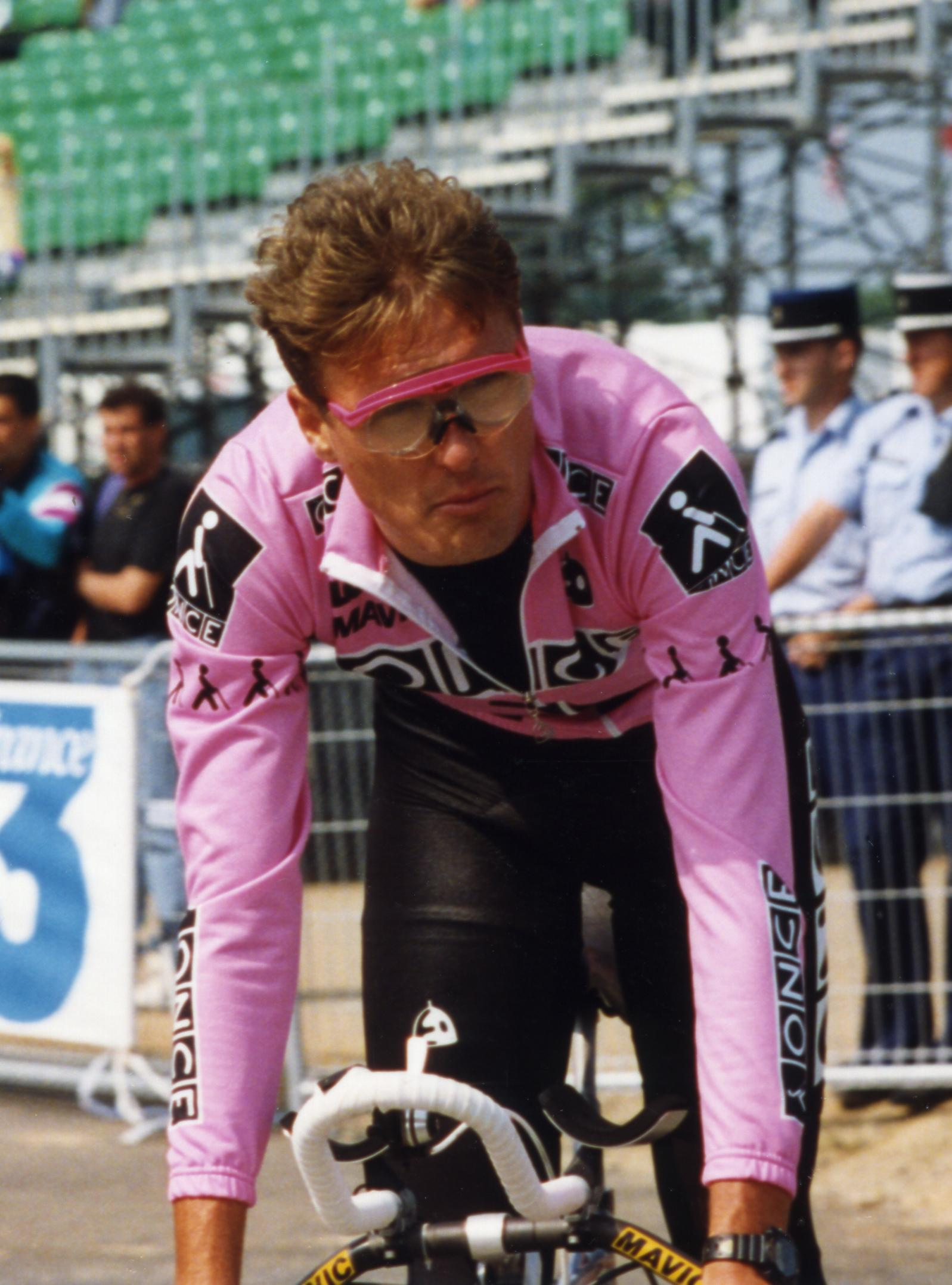
Alex Zülle achieved the Vuelta a Asturias in 1992.

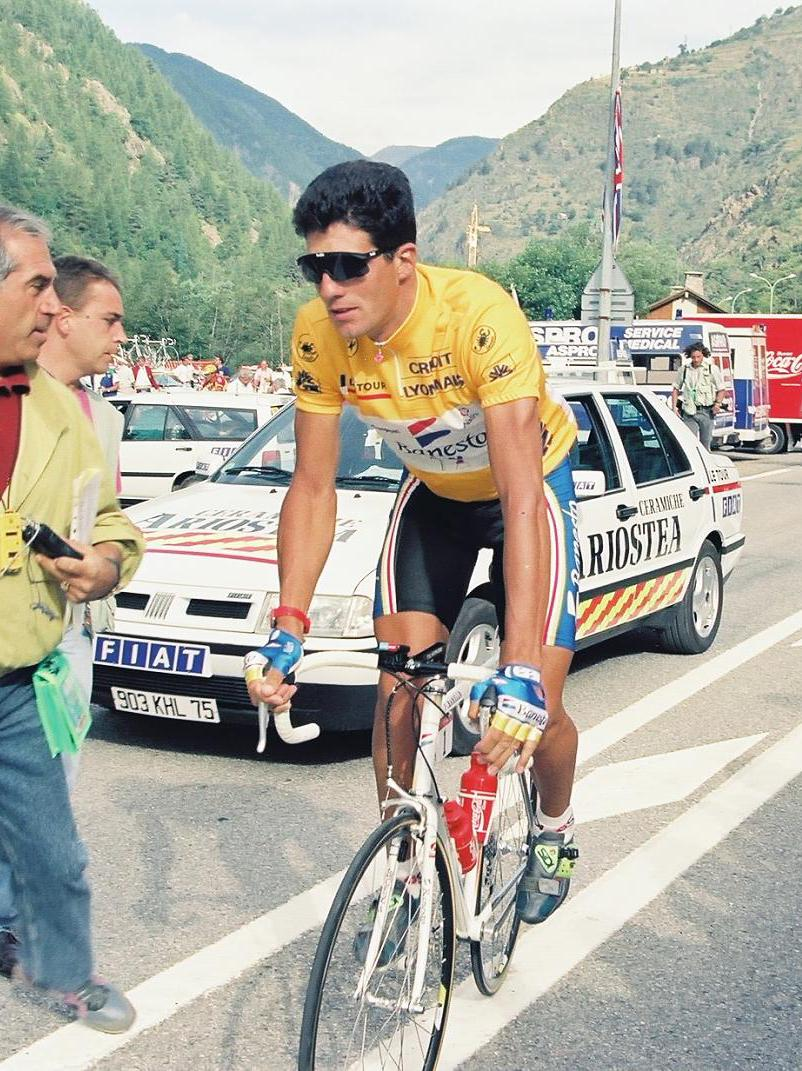
Miguel Induráin, winner in 1996

Year	Country	Rider	Team
1925	Spain	Segundo Barruetabeña	Arenas Club
1926	Spain	Ricardo Montero	Real Unión
1927	Spain	Miguel Mucio	individual
1928	Spain	Ricardo Montero	Real Unión
1929–1946	No race		
1947	Spain	Emilio Rodríguez	Real Sociedad
1948–1949	No race		
1950	Spain	Miguel Gual	individual
1951–1952	No race		
1953	Spain	Antonio Gelabert	Terrot–Hutchinson
1954	Spain	Bernardo Ruiz	Ideor
1955	Spain	Federico Bahamontes	Terrot–Hutchinson
1956	Spain	Emilio Hernán	Minaco
1957	Spain	Federico Bahamontes	Mobylette–Coabania
1958–1967	No race		
1968	Spain	Jesús Manzaneque	La Casera–Peña Bahamontes
1969	Spain	Andrés Oliva	La Casera–Peña Bahamontes
1970	Spain	Antonio Martos	Werner
1971	Spain	Eduardo Castelló	Karpy–Licor
1972	Spain	Agustín Tamames	Werner
1973	Spain	Jesús Manzaneque	La Casera–Peña Bahamontes
1974	Spain	Juan Manuel Santisteban	KAS–Kaskol
1975	Spain	Miguel María Lasa	KAS–Kaskol
1976	Spain	Santiago Lazcano	Super Ser
1977	Spain	Vicente López Carril	KAS–Campagnolo
1978	Spain	Enrique Martínez Heredia	KAS–Campagnolo
1979	Spain	Alberto Fernández	Moliner–Vereco
1980	Spain	Faustino Rupérez	Fosforera–Vereco
1981	Spain	Ángel Arroyo	Zor–Helios
1982	Spain	Jerónimo Ibáñez	Kelme–Merckx
1983	Spain	Pedro Muñoz	Zor–Gemeaz–Cusin
1984	Spain	Faustino Rupérez	Zor–Gemeaz
1985	Spain	Jesús Blanco Villar	Teka
1986	Spain	Jesús Rodríguez Magro	Zor–B.H. Sport
1987	Spain	Iñaki Gastón	Kas
1988	West Germany	Rolf Gölz	Superconfex–Yoko
1989	Netherlands	Gert-Jan Theunisse	PDM–Concorde
1990	Mexico	Raúl Alcalá	PDM–Concorde
1991	Latvia	Piotr Ugrumov	Seur
1992	Switzerland	Alex Zülle	ONCE
1993	Netherlands	Erik Breukink	ONCE
1994	Spain	Abraham Olano	Mapei–CLAS
1995	Switzerland	Beat Zberg	Carrera Jeans–Tassoni
1996	Spain	Miguel Induráin	Banesto
1997	Spain	Manuel Fernández Ginés	Banesto
1998	France	Laurent Jalabert	ONCE
1999	Spain	Juan Carlos Domínguez	Vitalicio Seguros–Grupo Generali
2000	Spain	Joseba Beloki	Festina
2001	Spain	Juan Carlos Domínguez	iBanesto.com
2002	Italy	Leonardo Piepoli	iBanesto.com
2003	Switzerland	Fabian Jeker	Milaneza–MSS
2004	Spain	Iban Mayo	Euskaltel–Euskadi
2005	Spain	Adolfo García Quesada	Comunidad Valenciana–Elche
2006	Spain	Óscar Sevilla	T-Mobile Team
2007	Spain	Koldo Gil	Saunier Duval–Prodir
2008	Spain	Ángel Vicioso	LA–MSS
2009	Spain	Francisco Mancebo	Rock Racing
2010	Spain	~~Constantino Zaballa~~ (Note: Zaballa's result was annulled by the Union Cycliste Internationale in 2012, after Zaballa had tested positive for using ephedrine.)	~~Centro Ciclismo de Loulé-Louletano~~
2011	Spain	Javier Moreno	Caja Rural
2012	Spain	Beñat Intxausti	Movistar Team
2013	Spain	Amets Txurruka	Caja Rural–Seguros RGA
2014	No race due to financial problems		
2015	Spain	Igor Antón	Movistar Team
2016	Great Britain	Hugh Carthy	Caja Rural–Seguros RGA
2017	Colombia	Nairo Quintana (Note: Quintana was named winner as Raúl Alarcón's win was annulled due to doping.)	Movistar Team
2018	Ecuador	Richard Carapaz	Movistar Team
2019	Ecuador	Richard Carapaz	Movistar Team
2020	No race due to the COVID-19 pandemic		
2021	Colombia	Nairo Quintana	Arkéa–Samsic
2022	Colombia	Iván Sosa	Movistar Team
2023	Italy	Lorenzo Fortunato	Eolo–Kometa
2024	Mexico	Isaac del Toro	UAE Team Emirates
2025	Spain	Marc Soler	UAE Team Emirates XRG
2026	Colombia	Nairo Quintana	Movistar Team
