= Vuelta a Burgos =

Spanish professional cycling race

Race details
- Date: Mid-August
- Region: Burgos, Spain
- English name: Tour of Burgos
- Local name: Vuelta a Burgos (in Spanish)
- Discipline: Road
- Competition: UCI ProSeries
- Type: Stage-race
- Web site: www.vueltaburgos.com

History
- First edition: 1946
- Editions: 47 (as of 2025)
- First winner: Bernardo Capó (ESP)
- Most wins: Marino Lejarreta (ESP) (4 wins)
- Most recent: Isaac del Toro (MEX)

Vuelta Ciclista a Burgos is an elite professional road bicycle racing event held annually in the Burgos province of Spain. The men's Vuelta a Burgos has been a multi-day stage race as part of the UCI Europe Tour since 2005. In 2019, a multi-day women's stage race, the Vuelta a Burgos Feminas, was added that runs in mid-May. The men's race became part of the UCI ProSeries in 2020.

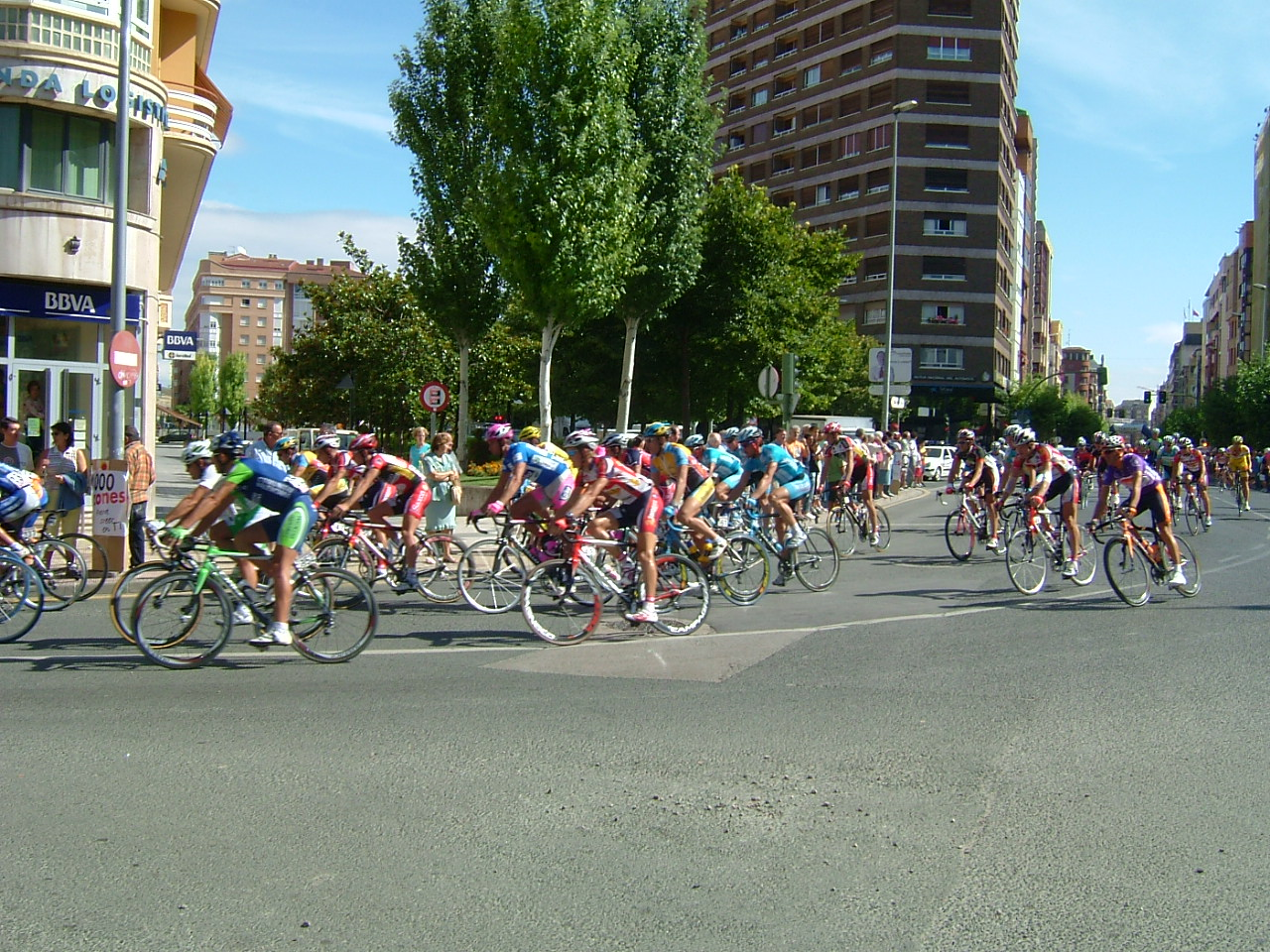
Vuelta a Burgos 2006: Peloton in Miranda

== Winners men's race ==
Year	Distance (km)	General	Mountains	Points
1946	-	(Spain) Bernardo Capó	(Spain) Bernardo Capó	-
1947	-	(Spain) Bernardo Ruiz	(Spain) Miguel Gual	-
1981	-	(Spain) Faustino Rupérez	(Spain) Pedro Muñoz	(Spain) Eulalio García
1982	-	(Spain) José Luis Laguía	(Spain) Felipe Yáñez	(Spain) Isidro Juárez
1983	-	(Spain) Ángel de las Heras	(Spain) José Luis Laguía	(Spain) Celestino Prieto
1984	-	(Spain) Federico Echave	(Spain) Juan Fernández	(Spain) Federico Echave
1985	-	(Spain) José Recio	(Spain) Jesús Rodríguez Magro	(Spain) Manuel Jorge Domínguez
1986	-	(Spain) Marino Lejarreta	(Spain) Mariano Sánchez Martinez	(Spain) Alfonso Gutiérrez
1987	-	(Spain) Marino Lejarreta	(Spain) Jesús Rodríguez Magro	(Spain) Marino Lejarreta
1988	-	(Spain) Marino Lejarreta	(Spain) Ángel Ocaña	(Spain) Marino Lejarreta
1989	-	(Spain) Francisco Antequera	(Spain) Pedro Muñoz	(Belgium) Eric Vanderaerden
1990	-	(Spain) Marino Lejarreta	(France) Charly Mottet	(Spain) Miguel Induráin
1991	-	(Spain) Pedro Delgado	(Spain) Pedro Delgado	(Switzerland) Stephan Joho
1992	-	(Switzerland) Alex Zülle	(Mexico) Raúl Alcalá	(France) Laurent Jalabert
1993	-	(Spain) Laudelino Cubino	(France) Francisque Teyssier	(Germany) Erik Zabel
1994	-	(France) Armand de las Cuevas	(United Kingdom) Robert Millar	(Italy) Samuele Schiavina
1995	-	(Switzerland) Laurent Dufaux	(France) François Simon	(Switzerland) Laurent Dufaux
1996	-	(Switzerland) Tony Rominger	(Spain) José María Jiménez	(Italy) Nicola Minali
1997	-	(France) Laurent Jalabert	(Spain) Jon Odriozola	(Spain) Abraham Olano
1998	691	(Spain) Abraham Olano	(Spain) José María Jiménez	(Belgium) Andrei Tchmil
1999	686	(Spain) Abraham Olano	(Italy) Stefano Casagranda	(Spain) Abraham Olano
2000	515	(Italy) Leonardo Piepoli	(Italy) Leonardo Piepoli	(France) Pascal Hervé
2001	782	(Spain) Juan Miguel Mercado	(Spain) José Luis Rubiera	(Spain) Óscar Freire
2002	682	(Spain) Francisco Mancebo	(Italy) Alessandro Bertolini	(Italy) Salvatore Commesso
2003	670.4	(Spain) Pablo Lastras	(Belgium) Dave Bruylandts	(Belgium) Dave Bruylandts
2004	633	(Spain) Alejandro Valverde	(Spain) Alejandro Valverde	(Spain) Alejandro Valverde
2005	665.5	(Spain) Juan Carlos Domínguez	(Spain) Luis Pérez	(Spain) Igor Astarloa
2006	671.8	(Spain) Iban Mayo	(Italy) Sergio Ghisalberti	(Spain) Carlos Torrent Tarres
2007	632	(Colombia) Mauricio Soler	(Belarus) Vasil Kiryienka	(Spain) Alejandro Valverde
2008	802	(Spain) Xabier Zandio	(Spain) Juan José Cobo	(Belarus) Yauheni Hutarovich
2009	641	(Spain) Alejandro Valverde	(Spain) Serafín Martínez	(Spain) Alejandro Valverde
2010	657	(Spain) Samuel Sánchez	(Spain) José Vicente Toribio	(Spain) Samuel Sánchez
2011	646.6	(Spain) Joaquim Rodríguez	(Spain) Mikel Landa	(Spain) Joaquim Rodríguez
2012	775	(Spain) Daniel Moreno	(Spain) Sergio Pardilla	(Spain) Daniel Moreno
2013	803	(Colombia) Nairo Quintana	(Spain) Amets Txurruka	(France) Anthony Roux
2014	619.4	(Colombia) Nairo Quintana	(Colombia) Nairo Quintana	(Spain) Daniel Moreno
2015	658	(Estonia) Rein Taaramäe	(Colombia) Fabio Duarte	(Spain) Daniel Moreno
2016	674.72	(Spain) Alberto Contador	(Spain) Omar Fraile	(Netherlands) Danny van Poppel
2017	771	(Spain) Mikel Landa	(Spain) Mikel Landa	(Spain) Mikel Landa
2018	775	(Colombia) Iván Sosa	(Colombia) Iván Sosa	(Colombia) Miguel Ángel López
2019	787	(Colombia) Iván Sosa	(Colombia) Iván Sosa	(Spain) Alex Aranburu
2020	797	(Belgium) Remco Evenepoel	(Spain) Gotzon Martín	(Spain) Mikel Landa
2021	804	(Spain) Mikel Landa	(France) Romain Bardet	(Colombia) Juan Sebastián Molano
2022	810	(France) Pavel Sivakov	(Colombia) Miguel Ángel López	(Portugal) Ruben Guerreiro
2023	674.2	(Slovenia) Primož Roglič	(United Kingdom) Adam Yates	(Slovenia) Primož Roglič
2024	641.5	(United States) Sepp Kuss	(Spain) Diego Pablo Sevilla	(Czech Republic) Pavel Bittner
2025	851.4	(Mexico) Isaac del Toro	(Spain) Carlos García Pierna	(Italy) Giulio Ciccone
