= 2000 Volta a Catalunya =

Race details
- Dates: 15–22 June 2000
- Stages: 8
- Distance: 984.2 km (611.6 mi)
- Winning time: 24h 36' 59"

Results
	Winner	José María Jiménez (ESP)	(Banesto)
	Second	Óscar Sevilla (ESP)	(Kelme–Costa Blanca)
	Third	Leonardo Piepoli (ITA)	(Banesto)
	Points	Óscar Sevilla (ESP)	(Kelme–Costa Blanca)
	Mountains	Óscar Sevilla (ESP)	(Kelme–Costa Blanca)
	Sprints	Guido Trenti (USA)	(Cantina Tollo–Regain)
	Team	Banesto	

The 2000 Volta a Catalunya was the 80th edition of the Volta a Catalunya cycle race and was held from 15 June to 22 June 2000. The race started in La Pineda and finished at Viola Rabassa in Andorra. The race was won by José María Jiménez of the Banesto team.

== Teams ==
Sixteen teams of up to eight riders started the race:

- Mapei–Quick-Step
- Team Telekom
- Kelme–Costa Blanca
- Lampre–Daikin
- Banesto
- Vitalicio Seguros
- Euskaltel–Euskadi
- ONCE–Deutsche Bank
- U.S. Postal Service
- Colchon Relax–Fuenlabrada
- Vini Caldirola–Sidermec
- Jazztel–Costa de Almería
- Memory Card–Jack & Jones
- Farm Frites
- Festina
- Cantina Tollo–Regain

== Route ==
Stage characteristics and winners
Stage	Date	Course	Distance	Type	Winner
1	15 June	Pineda to Vilaseca	21.8 km (13.5 mi)	Team time trial	ONCE–Deutsche Bank
2	16 June	Vilaseca to Vilanova i Geltrú	160 km (99.4 mi)		Erik Zabel (GER)
3	17 June	Vilanova to Badalona	154 km (95.7 mi)		Erik Zabel (GER)
4	18 June	Badalona to Barcelona	158 km (98.2 mi)		Gabriele Missaglia (ITA)
5	19 June	Argentona to Roses	159 km (98.8 mi)		Giovanni Lombardi (ITA)
6	20 June	Roses to Prades	164 km (101.9 mi)		Giovanni Lombardi (ITA)
7	21 June	Prades to Encamp	154 km (95.7 mi)		José María Jiménez (ESP)
8	22 June	Sant Julià de Lòria to Viola Rabassa	12.8 km (8.0 mi)	Individual time trial	José María Jiménez (ESP)

== General classification ==
Final general classification

Rank	Rider	Team	Time
1	José María Jiménez (ESP)	Banesto	24h 36' 59"
2	Óscar Sevilla (ESP)	Kelme–Costa Blanca	+ 41"
3	Leonardo Piepoli (ITA)	Banesto	+ 3' 41"
4	Jörg Jaksche (GER)	Team Telekom	+ 4' 15"
5	Manuel Beltrán (ESP)	Mapei–Quick-Step	+ 4' 55"
6	Santiago Blanco (ESP)	Vitalicio Seguros	+ 5' 05"
7	Fernando Escartín (ESP)	Kelme–Costa Blanca	+ 5' 44"
8	Roberto Sgambelluri (ITA)	Cantina Tollo–Regain	+ 5' 51"
9	Axel Merckx (BEL)	Mapei–Quick-Step	+ 6' 00"
10	Pavel Tonkov (RUS)	Mapei–Quick-Step	+ 6' 10"
