= 2002 Vuelta a Asturias =

Race details
- Dates: 15–19 May 2002
- Stages: 5
- Distance: 805.2 km (500.3 mi)
- Winning time: 20h 49' 21"

Results
Jersey awarded to the overall winner	Winner	Leonardo Piepoli (ITA)	(iBanesto.com)
	Second	David Bernabeu (ESP)	(Carvalhelhos–Boavista)
	Third	Joseba Beloki (ESP)	(ONCE–Eroski)

The 2002 Vuelta a Asturias was the 46th edition of the Vuelta a Asturias road cycling stage race, which was held from 15 May to 19 May 2002. The race started and finished in Oviedo. The race was won by Leonardo Piepoli of the iBanesto.com team.

== General classification ==
Final general classification:

Rank	Rider	Team	Time
1	Leonardo Piepoli (ITA)	iBanesto.com	20h 49' 21"
2	David Bernabeu (ESP)	Carvalhelhos–Boavista	+ 3"
3	Joseba Beloki (ESP)	ONCE–Eroski	+ 4"
4	Ricardo Valdés (ESP)	Jazztel–Costa de Almería	+ 33"
5	Gonzalo Bayarri (ESP)	Jazztel–Costa de Almería	+ 40"
6	Óscar Sevilla (ESP)	Kelme–Costa Blanca	+ 52"
7	Isidro Nozal (ESP)	ONCE–Eroski	s.t.
8	Rubén Lobato (ESP)	Acqua & Sapone–Cantina Tollo	+ 56"
9	Aitor Osa (ESP)	iBanesto.com	+ 1' 07"
10	Vladimir Karpets (RUS)	Itera	+ 1' 08"
