= Íñigo Cuesta =

Spanish cyclist (born 1969)

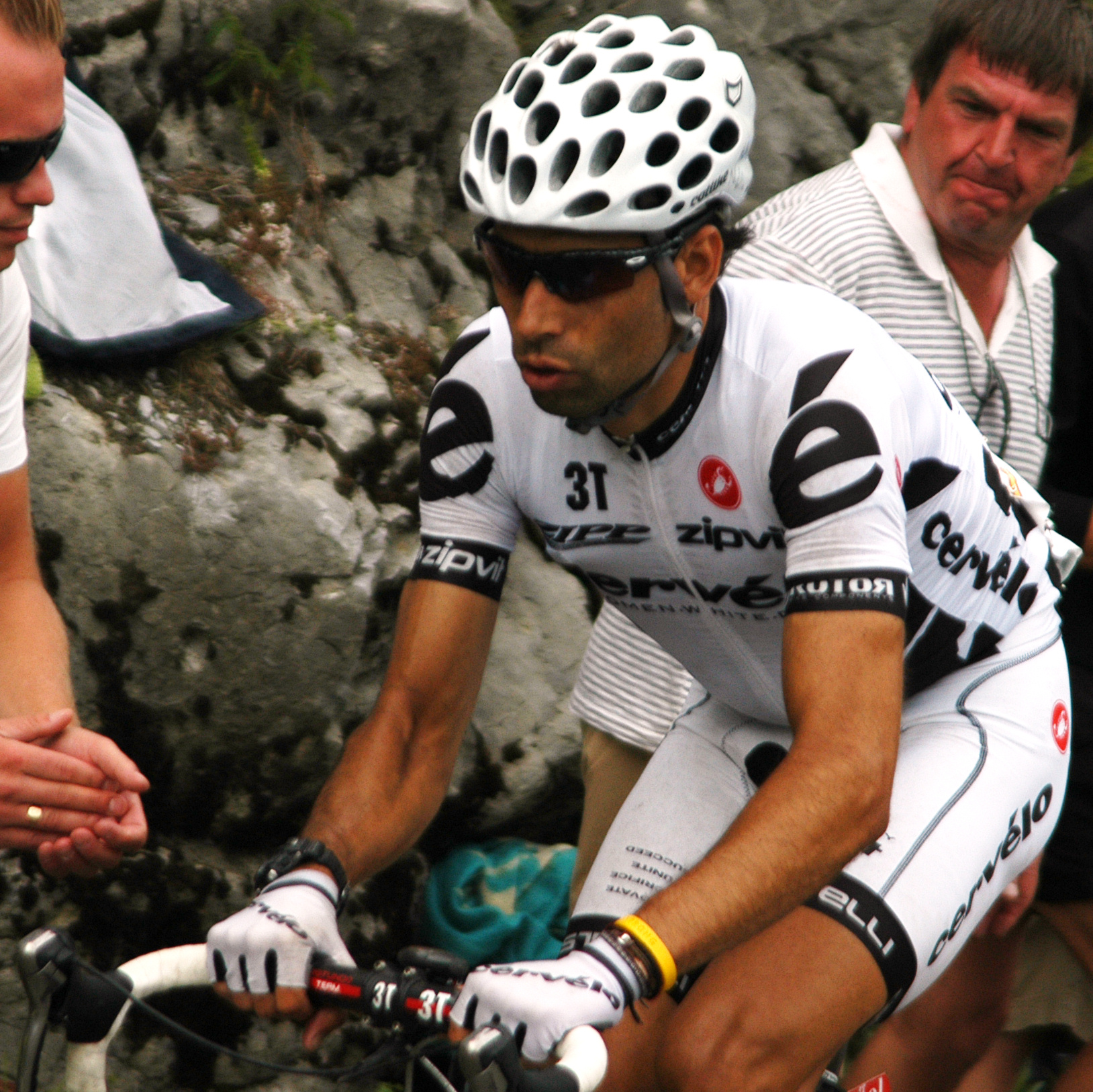

Personal information
- Full name: Íñigo Cuesta López de Castro
- Born: June 3, 1969 (age 57) Villarcayo de Merindad de Castilla la Vieja, Spain
- Height: 1.76 m (5 ft 9 1/2 in)
- Weight: 62 kg (137 lb; 9 st 11 lb)

Cycling career
- Sport: Cycling
- Current team: Burgos Alimenta Women Cycling Sport
- Discipline: Road
- Role: Rider (retired); Directeur sportif
- Rider type: Domestique; Climber

Professional teams
- 1994–1995: Euskadi–Petronor
- 1996–2000: ONCE
- 2001–2004: Cofidis
- 2005: Saunier Duval–Prodir
- 2006–2008: Team CSC
- 2009–2010: Cervélo TestTeam
- 2011: Caja Rural

Managerial team
- 2020–: Casa Dorada Women Cycling

Major wins
- Tour of the Basque Country (1998)

Íñigo Cuesta López de Castro (born 2 June 1969) is a Spanish former professional road bicycle racer, who now works as a directeur sportif for UCI Women's Continental Team Burgos Alimenta Women Cycling Sport.

== Career ==
Born in Villarcayo de Merindad de Castilla la Vieja, Burgos, Cuesta turned professional in 1994 for the Basque Euskadi–Petronor team. Here his results included a second place in 1995 Vuelta a Asturias, and in 1996 he signed a contract with Spanish team ONCE. Cuesta would have to wait until 1998 before he won his first race, the overall victory in the stage race Tour of the Basque Country. In securing the stage race win, he proved his talent as both a climber and time trialist, though not on the level of the Grand Tours.

Even though he won a second triumph, a stage in the 2000 Critérium du Dauphiné Libéré, he did not get his contract renewed. Instead he signed with Cofidis, after his initial new employer, Linda McCartney Racing Team, went bankrupt before the season started. His four years at Cofidis did not provide Cuesta with any more wins, his biggest result a 13th place in the 2001 Vuelta a España. In 2005 he changed to Saunier Duval–Prodir, where he won stage 5 in the Volta a Catalunya, during the early part of the 2005 UCI ProTour season. Though he still had one year remaining of his contract, Cuesta changed to Team CSC before the 2006 season. Here he assisted team captain Carlos Sastre in the Vuelta a España.

Cuesta continued to help Sastre in 2009, after the announcement that he changed team and joined the new Cervélo TestTeam. During the 2010 Vuelta a España, Cuesta started for the 17th consecutive year, a new record. To commemorate this, the race organizers gave him jersey number one, normally worn by the winner of the previous edition.

He announced his retirement in August 2011 after his team were not selected for the Vuelta a España.

== Major results ==
1995
2nd Overall Vuelta a Asturias
8th Overall Euskal Bizikleta
1996
2nd Overall Volta a la Comunitat Valenciana
2nd Overall Setmana Catalana de Ciclisme
3rd Overall Vuelta a Castilla y León
3rd Overall Vuelta a Burgos
3rd Overall Vuelta a Mallorca
3rd Classique des Alpes
5th Subida a Urkiola
6th Overall Paris-Nice
1997
4th Overall Vuelta a Burgos
5th Overall Tour of Galicia
1998
1st Overall Tour of the Basque Country
3rd Overall Vuelta a Aragón
6th Overall Setmana Catalana de Ciclisme
1999
10th Overall Vuelta a Murcia
2000
Critérium du Dauphiné Libéré

1st Mountains classification
1st Stage 6

2002
7th Overall Critérium International
10th Overall Tour de Romandie
2004
1st Mountains classification Tour du Limousin
9th Overall Volta a la Comunitat Valenciana
2005
Volta a Catalunya

1st Mountains classification
1st Stage 5

2006
1st Stage 4 Giro d'Italia (TTT)
7th Overall Deutschland Tour
2008
5th Overall Tour de Georgia
6th Overall Vuelta a Murcia
2009
8th Overall Vuelta a Burgos
