= 1995 Vuelta a Asturias =

Race details
- Dates: 16–21 May 1995
- Stages: 5
- Distance: 848 km (526.9 mi)
- Winning time: 21h 48' 02"

Results
Jersey awarded to the overall winner	Winner	Beat Zberg (SUI)	(Carrera Jeans–Tassoni)
	Second	Íñigo Cuesta (ESP)	(Equipo Euskadi)
	Third	Miguel Induráin (ESP)	(Banesto)

The 1995 Vuelta a Asturias was the 39th edition of the Vuelta a Asturias road cycling stage race, which was held from 16 May to 21 May 1995. The race started and finished in Oviedo. The race was won by Beat Zberg of the Carrera Jeans–Tassoni team.

== General classification ==
Final general classification

Rank	Rider	Team	Time
1	Beat Zberg (SUI)	Carrera Jeans–Tassoni	21h 48' 02"
2	Íñigo Cuesta (ESP)	Equipo Euskadi	+ 1' 10"
3	Miguel Induráin (ESP)	Banesto	+ 1' 11"
4	Vicente Aparicio (ESP)	Banesto	+ 1' 34"
5	Libardo Niño (COL)	Kelme–Sureña	+ 2' 01"
6	Félix García Casas (ESP)	Artiach–Chiquilin	+ 2' 36"
7	Santiago Blanco (ESP)	Banesto	+ 4' 12"
8	Mariano Rojas (ESP)	ONCE	+ 4' 14"
9	Antonio Politano (ITA)	Mercatone Uno–Saeco	+ 4' 26"
10	José Manuel García (ESP)	Artiach–Chiquilin	+ 6' 55"
