= 1996 Vuelta a Castilla y León =

Race details
- Dates: 4–8 August 1996
- Stages: 5
- Distance: 892.5 km (554.6 mi)
- Winning time: 22h 57' 10"

Results
	Winner	Andrea Peron (ITA)
	Second	Udo Bölts (GER)
	Third	Íñigo Cuesta (ESP)

The 1996 Vuelta a Castilla y León was the 11th edition of the Vuelta a Castilla y León cycle race and was held on 4 August to 8 August 1996. The race started in Valladolid and finished in Villablino. The race was won by Andrea Peron.

== General classification ==
Final general classification

Rank	Rider	Time
1	Andrea Peron (ITA)	22h 57' 10"
2	Udo Bölts (GER)	s.t.
3	Íñigo Cuesta (ESP)	+ 7"
4	Kevin Livingston (USA)	+ 23"
5	Francisco Cabello (ESP)	+ 30"
6	Oliverio Rincón (COL)	+ 45"
7	José María Jiménez (ESP)	+ 56"
8	Jesus Montoya (ESP)	+ 1' 31"
9	Francisco José García (ESP)	+ 6' 40"
10	Luis Díaz De Otazu (ESP)	+ 6' 44"
