= 1996 Vuelta a Burgos =

Race details
- Dates: 19–23 August 1996
- Stages: 5
- Distance: 691.5 km (429.7 mi)
- Winning time: 17h 14' 34"

Results
	Winner	Tony Rominger (SUI)	(Mapei–GB)
	Second	Miguel Induráin (ESP)	(Banesto)
	Third	Íñigo Cuesta (ESP)	(ONCE)

The 1996 Vuelta a Burgos was the 18th edition of the Vuelta a Burgos road cycling stage race, which was held from 19 August to 23 August 1996. The race started and finished in Burgos. The race was won by Tony Rominger of the Mapei–GB team.

== General classification ==
Final general classification

Rank	Rider	Team	Time
1	Tony Rominger (SUI)	Mapei–GB	17h 14' 34"
2	Miguel Induráin (ESP)	Banesto	+ 1' 51"
3	Íñigo Cuesta (ESP)	ONCE	+ 2' 11"
4	Arsenio González (ESP)	Mapei–GB	+ 2' 18"
5	Laurent Jalabert (FRA)	ONCE	+ 2' 24"
6	José María Jiménez (ESP)	Banesto	+ 2' 35"
7	Laurent Dufaux (SUI)	Festina–Lotus	+ 2' 37"
8	Neil Stephens (AUS)	ONCE	+ 2' 39"
9	Juan Carlos Domínguez (ESP)	Kelme–Artiach	+ 2' 43"
10	Mikel Zarrabeitia (ESP)	ONCE	+ 3' 12"
