= 2004 Vuelta a Andalucía =

Race details
- Dates: 15–19 February 2004
- Stages: 5
- Distance: 870.8 km (541.1 mi)
- Winning time: 22h 03' 57"

Results
	Winner	Juan Carlos Domínguez (ESP)
	Second	Carlos García Quesada (ESP)
	Third	Samuel Sánchez (ESP)

The 2004 Vuelta a Andalucía was the 50th edition of the Vuelta a Andalucía (Ruta del Sol) cycle race and was held on 15 February to 19 February 2004. The race started in Huelva and finished in Almería. The race was won by Juan Carlos Domínguez.

== Teams ==
Thirteen teams of eight riders started the race:

- Comunidad Valenciana–Kelme
- Relax–Bodysol
- T-Mobile Team
- Rabobank
- Costa de Almería–Paternina
- Quick-Step–Davitamon
- Cafés Baqué
- Euskaltel–Euskadi
- Lotto–Domo
- U.S. Postal Service
- Illes Balears–Banesto
- Phonak
- Saunier Duval–Prodir

== General classification ==
Final general classification

Rank	Rider	Time
1	Juan Carlos Domínguez (ESP)	22h 03' 57"
2	Carlos García Quesada (ESP)	+ 15"
3	Samuel Sánchez (ESP)	+ 19"
4	José Gómez Marchante (ESP)	+ 28"
5	Aitor Osa (ESP)	+ 34"
6	Joaquim Rodríguez (ESP)	+ 44"
7	Iñigo Landaluze (ESP)	+ 51"
8	Erik Dekker (NED)	+ 54"
9	David Fernández Domingo (ESP)	+ 55"
10	Santiago Pérez (ESP)	+ 56"
