= 2000 Vuelta a Burgos =

Race details
- Dates: 7–10 August 2000
- Stages: 4
- Distance: 515 km (320.0 mi)
- Winning time: 12h 28' 12"

Results
	Winner	Leonardo Piepoli (ITA)	(Banesto)
	Second	Óscar Sevilla (ESP)	(Kelme–Costa Blanca)
	Third	Pascal Hervé (FRA)	(Team Polti)

The 2000 Vuelta a Burgos was the 22nd edition of the Vuelta a Burgos road cycling stage race, which was held from 7 August to 10 August 2000. The race started in Miranda de Ebro and finished in Burgos. The race was won by Leonardo Piepoli of the Banesto team.

== General classification ==
Final general classification

Rank	Rider	Team	Time
1	Leonardo Piepoli (ITA)	Banesto	12h 28' 12"
2	Óscar Sevilla (ESP)	Kelme–Costa Blanca	+ 25"
3	Pascal Hervé (FRA)	Team Polti	+ 34"
4	Raimondas Rumšas (LTU)	Fassa Bortolo	+ 35"
5	Igor González de Galdeano (ESP)	Vitalicio Seguros	+ 59"
6	Manuel Beltrán (ESP)	Mapei–Quick-Step	+ 1' 01"
7	Dave Bruylandts (BEL)	Palmans–Ideal	+ 1' 10"
8	Félix García Casas (ESP)	Festina	+ 1' 21"
9	Kevin Livingston (USA)	U.S. Postal Service	+ 1' 22"
10	Fernando Escartín (ESP)	Kelme–Costa Blanca	+ 1' 24"
