= 1995 Tour de Suisse =

Race details
- Dates: 13–22 June 1995
- Stages: 9 + Prologue
- Distance: 1,619 km (1,006 mi)
- Winning time: 40h 13' 12"

Results
	Winner	Pavel Tonkov (RUS)	(Lampre–Panaria)
	Second	Alex Zülle (SUI)	(ONCE)
	Third	Zenon Jaskuła (POL)	(Aki–Gipiemme)
	Points	Alex Zülle (SUI)	(ONCE)
	Mountains	Leonardo Piepoli (ITA)	(Refin)
	Combination	Pavel Tonkov (RUS)	(Lampre–Panaria)
	Team	Gewiss–Ballan	

The 1995 Tour de Suisse was the 59th edition of the Tour de Suisse cycle race and was held from 13 June to 22 June 1995. The race started in Bellinzona and finished in Zürich. The race was won by Pavel Tonkov of the Lampre team.

== General classification ==
Final general classification

Rank	Rider	Team	Time
1	Pavel Tonkov (RUS)	Lampre–Panaria	40h 13' 12"
2	Alex Zülle (SUI)	ONCE	+ 11"
3	Zenon Jaskuła (POL)	Aki–Gipiemme	+ 4' 19"
4	Giorgio Furlan (ITA)	Gewiss–Ballan	+ 6' 31"
5	Beat Zberg (SUI)	Carrera Jeans–Tassoni	+ 7' 50"
6	Ivan Gotti (ITA)	Gewiss–Ballan	+ 7' 57"
7	Leonardo Piepoli (ITA)	Refin	+ 8' 43"
8	Davide Rebellin (ITA)	MG Maglificio–Technogym	+ 8' 44"
9	Andrey Teteryuk (KAZ)	Aki–Gipiemme	+ 9' 27"
10	Fernando Escartín (ESP)	Mapei–GB–Latexco	+ 9' 28"
