= 2004 Vuelta a Asturias =

Race details
- Dates: 12–16 May 2004
- Stages: 5
- Distance: 848.3 km (527.1 mi)
- Winning time: 20h 49' 54"

Results
Jersey awarded to the overall winner	Winner	Iban Mayo (ESP)	(Euskaltel–Euskadi)
	Second	Félix Cárdenas (COL)	(Cafés Baqué)
	Third	Haimar Zubeldia (ESP)	(Euskaltel–Euskadi)

The 2004 Vuelta a Asturias was the 48th edition of the Vuelta a Asturias road cycling stage race, which was held from 12 May to 16 May 2004. The race started and finished in Oviedo. The race was won by Iban Mayo of the Euskaltel–Euskadi team.

== General classification ==
Final general classification

Rank	Rider	Team	Time
1	Iban Mayo (ESP)	Euskaltel–Euskadi	20h 49' 54"
2	Félix Cárdenas (COL)	Cafés Baqué	+ 1' 18"
3	Haimar Zubeldia (ESP)	Euskaltel–Euskadi	+ 1' 47"
4	Leonardo Piepoli (ITA)	Saunier Duval–Prodir	+ 2' 05"
5	José Gómez Marchante (ESP)	Costa de Almería–Paternina	+ 2' 28"
6	Eladio Jiménez (ESP)	Comunidad Valenciana–Kelme	+ 2' 35"
7	Fabian Jeker (SUI)	Saunier Duval–Prodir	+ 2' 45"
8	David Arroyo (ESP)	LA Alumínios–Pecol	+ 2' 46"
9	Iván Parra (COL)	Comunidad Valenciana–Kelme	+ 3' 05"
10	Samuel Sánchez (ESP)	Euskaltel–Euskadi	+ 3' 42"
