= 2000 Tour of the Basque Country =

Race details
- Dates: 3–7 April 2000
- Stages: 5
- Distance: 822.5 km (511.1 mi)
- Winning time: 21h 53' 28"

Results
	Winner	Andreas Klöden (GER)	(Team Telekom)
	Second	Danilo Di Luca (ITA)	(Cantina Tollo–Regain)
	Third	Laurent Jalabert (FRA)	(ONCE–Deutsche Bank)

The 2000 Tour of the Basque Country (Spanish: Vuelta al País Vasco) was the 40th edition of the Tour of the Basque Country cycle race and was held from 3 April to 7 April 2000. The race started in Oñati and finished at Madarixa. The race was won by Andreas Klöden of the Telekom team.

== General classification ==
Final general classification

Rank	Rider	Team	Time
1	Andreas Klöden (GER)	Team Telekom	21h 53' 28"
2	Danilo Di Luca (ITA)	Cantina Tollo–Regain	+ 5"
3	Laurent Jalabert (FRA)	ONCE–Deutsche Bank	+ 31"
4	Bingen Fernández (ESP)	Euskaltel–Euskadi	+ 33"
5	Davide Rebellin (ITA)	Liquigas–Pata	+ 37"
6	Aitor Osa (ESP)	Banesto	+ 37"
7	Juan Carlos Domínguez (ESP)	Vitalicio Seguros	+ 39"
8	Aitor Garmendia (ESP)	Banesto	+ 45"
9	Michael Boogerd (NED)	Rabobank	+ 59"
10	Txema del Olmo (ESP)	Euskaltel–Euskadi	+ 1' 03"
