= Tyler Hamilton =

American cyclist (born 1971)

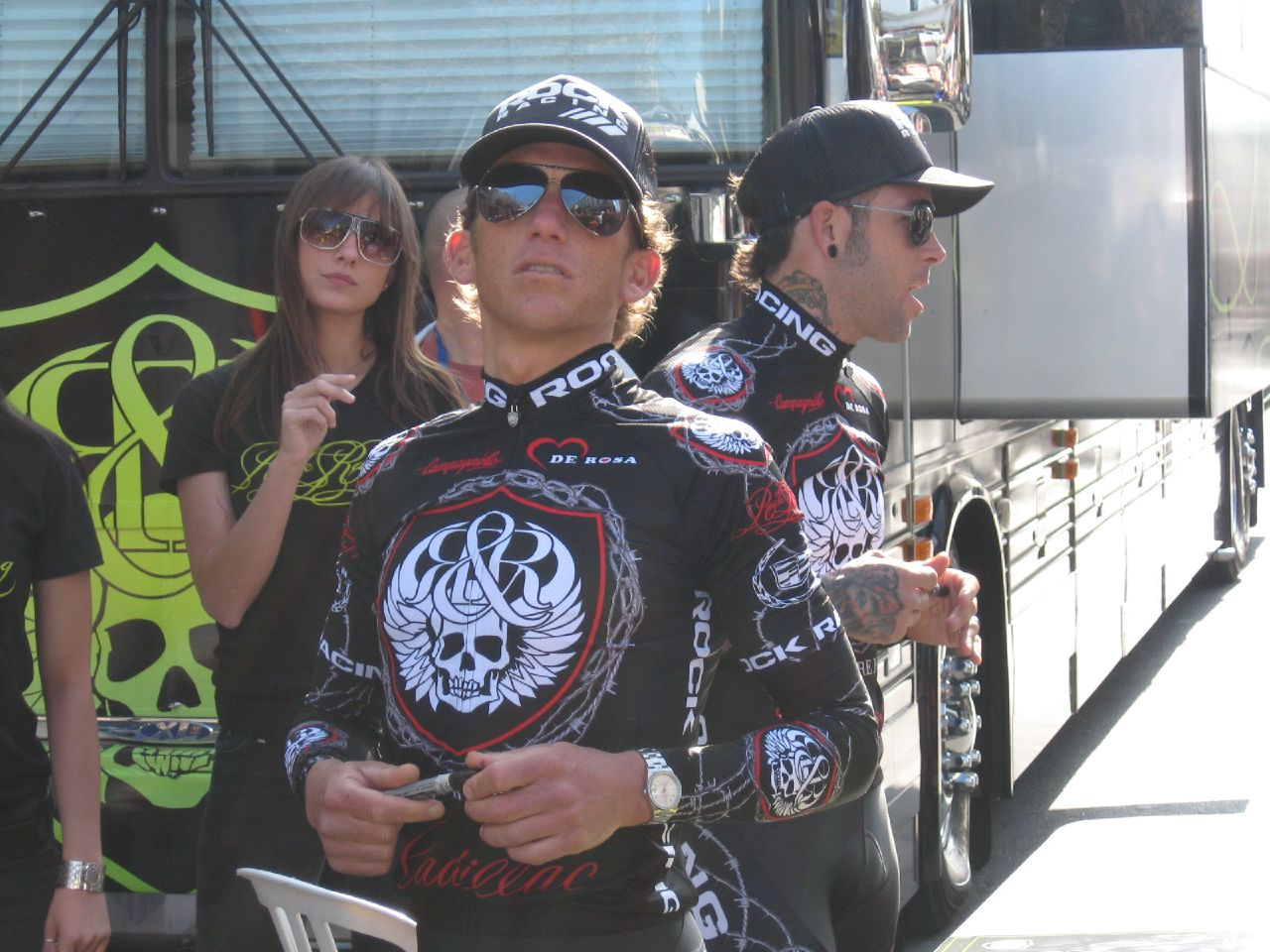
- Hamilton at the 2008 Tour of California

Personal information
- Full name: Tyler Hamilton
- Born: March 1, 1971 (age 55) Marblehead, Massachusetts, United States
- Height: 1.72 m (5 ft 7 1/2 in)
- Weight: 65 kg (143 lb; 10 st 3 lb)

Cycling career
- Sport: Cycling
- Current team: Retired
- Discipline: Road
- Role: Rider
- Rider type: All-rounder

Amateur team
- 1994: Coors Light (stagiare)

Professional teams
- 1995–2001: Montgomery–Bell
- 2002–2003: CSC–Tiscali
- 2004: Phonak
- 2007: Tinkoff Credit Systems
- 2008: Rock Racing

Major wins
- Grand Tours Tour de France 1 individual stage (2003) Giro d'Italia 1 individual stage (2002) Stage races Critérium du Dauphiné (2000) Tour de Romandie (2003, 2004) One-day races and Classics National Road Race Championships (2008) Liège–Bastogne–Liège (2003)
Medal record
Men's road cycling
Representing the United States
Olympic Games
Disqualified	2004 Athens	Time trial

Tyler Hamilton (born March 1, 1971) is an American former professional road bicycle racer. He is the only American rider to win one of the five Monuments of cycling, taking Liège–Bastogne–Liège in 2003. Hamilton became a professional cyclist in 1995 with the US Postal Service cycling team. He was a teammate of Lance Armstrong during the 1999, 2000 and 2001 Tours de France, where Armstrong won the general classification. He was a key asset for Armstrong, being a very good climber as well as time-trialist. Hamilton appeared at the 2000 and 2004 Summer Olympics. In 2004, he won a gold medal at the individual time trial. The first doping test after his Olympic victory gave a positive result, but because the backup sample was frozen, no doping offence could be proven. After he failed further doping tests at the 2004 Vuelta a España, Hamilton was suspended for two years from the sport.

Hamilton came back after his suspension and became national road race champion in 2008. In 2009, Hamilton failed a doping test again, and was banned for eight years, which effectively caused him to retire. In July 2010, he was subpoenaed to appear before a grand jury for the use of performance-enhancing drugs in cycling. In May 2011, Hamilton admitted that he had used banned substances in competition, and returned his gold medal. In 2012, he co-authored a book The Secret Race: Inside the Hidden World of the Tour de France: Doping, Cover-ups, and Winning at All Costs, which details his doping practices and experience in the world of cycling. On August 10, 2012 the International Olympic Committee (IOC) stripped Hamilton of his 2004 gold medal.

== Biography ==
Hamilton was raised in Marblehead, Massachusetts, and attended Holderness School in Plymouth, New Hampshire, where he started cycling. After graduating in 1990, he attended the University of Colorado at Boulder as a ski racer but never finished the final semester of his BA degree course in economics. A back injury (two broken vertebrae while mountain bike training on ski jump) at the University of Colorado developmental ski team in September 1991 ended his skiing, and he switched to cycling.

He turned pro in 1995 for the Montgomery Bell Cycling team which later became the U.S. Postal Service cycling team and raced for them in the 1997, 1998, 1999, 2000 and 2001 Tour de France. Hamilton protected Lance Armstrong in the mountains, and was on Armstrong's first three Tour de France winning Postal squads and quickly grew to stardom. Hamilton acted as a scout in individual time trials, riding as hard as possible to provide time-split comparisons for Armstrong. During this time he won the 1999 Danmark Rundt and the 2000 Critérium du Dauphiné Libéré, winning stages 4 and 5.

In 2001, Hamilton left U.S. Postal for Team CSC. He was made a leader under manager Bjarne Riis. Hamilton fractured a shoulder in a crash in the 2002 Giro d'Italia but still managed to win stage 14 and finish second overall, under 2 minutes behind race winner Paolo Savoldelli. Later that year, he participated in the 2002 Tour de France, riding in support of Carlos Sastre and finished 15th overall. In 2003, Hamilton became the first American rider to win Liège–Bastogne–Liège, breaking away from a select group of riders around four kilometers from the line in wet conditions. He later won the Tour de Romandie that year, as he prepared to race the Tour de France. In the 2003 Tour de France he broke his collarbone on the first stage in a pile-up. Instead of withdrawing from the race, he stayed to finish the tour, and exceeded everyone's expectations when he was able to follow and attack Armstrong up Alpe d'Huez on stage 8. Later, he rode one of the Tour's most memorable feats, winning stage 16 with a 142 km solo breakaway, gaining two minutes over the field. For his stage win, Hamilton was awarded the Coeur de Lion prize (French for Heart of the Lion, the name of the cheese maker that sponsored the award), as the most daring racer of the stage. He finished the 2003 Tour de France 4th overall and returned home nationally recognized.

In 2004, Hamilton left Team CSC and joined the Phonak Hearing Systems. He assembled a team of good, well-known riders and prepared for racing in the upcoming Tour de France, winning the 2004 Tour of Romandie for the second year in a row. Furthermore, he placed 2nd in the 2004 Dauphine Libere, beating Armstrong up the Mont Ventoux time trial which promoted him to one of the Tour de France favorites. However, in the 2004 Tour de France he dropped out on stage 13, after back pain mostly due to a crash on stage 6.

In 2021 he married his long time girlfriend Kristina Hamilton and they had a baby boy together.

In 2019, Hamilton joined Black Swift Group, LLC, an investment advisor and money manager based in Boulder, Colorado.

=== Olympic gold and doping confession ===
At the 2004 Summer Olympics in Athens, Hamilton won the gold medal in the men's individual time trial. That medal was placed in doubt on September 20, 2004, after he failed a test for blood doping (receiving blood transfusions to boost performance) at the Olympics. Two days after the announcement of his positive test at Athens, the IOC announced Hamilton would keep his medal because results could not be obtained from the second sample. The Athens lab had frozen the backup, which made it impossible to repeat the test. The Russian Olympic Committee appealed to the International Court of Arbitration for Sport to give Hamilton's medal to Russian silver medalist Viatcheslav Ekimov. However, on June 27, 2006, the court rejected the request.

In the Vuelta a España, he won the stage 9 time trial on September 11, 2004, but left the race six days later, citing stomach problems. As winner of the stage, he was subjected to a doping test. He was told by the Union Cycliste Internationale (UCI) on September 13, 2004 that his two samples from two days earlier showed a "foreign blood population". After supporting Hamilton, Phonak team managers withdrew their support after a second member of the team, Santiago Pérez, was found positive for the same offense at the 2004 Vuelta a España.

The positive sample at the Olympics, and the positive test at the Vuelta were not the only indications that Hamilton was manipulating his hematocrit level. In April 2004 his blood was found to have a high ratio of hemoglobin to reticulocytes (young red blood cells), indicative of EPO or blood doping. His score was 132.9; a clean athlete would score 90. The UCI suspends a rider if the score exceeds 133. This sample also showed someone else's blood was in his bloodstream. However, neither piece of evidence in isolation constituted a positive drug test (and the test for a mixed cell population had not yet been adopted), so no action was taken.

On April 18, 2005 Hamilton was sanctioned by the United States Anti-Doping Agency and received a two-year suspension, the maximum sentence for a first offense.

On May 18, 2005, he appealed to the Court of Arbitration for Sport but, after allowing Hamilton to gather evidence, the court dismissed his appeal. Hamilton claimed the UCI-sanctioned test was insufficiently validated (and may have returned a false positive result) and that some of the agencies involved had concealed documents that would support his case. He also maintained that, even if foreign cells were present, they were natural and not the result of a transfusion.

Hamilton was banned until September 22, 2006, two years from the date his "B" sample in the Vuelta a España was found positive.

In 2010, Hamilton was subpoenaed by a federal grand jury to testify in their doping investigation of Lance Armstrong. Hamilton admitted in his testimony that he took banned performance-enhancing drugs during his cycling career.

On May 20, 2011, he also made the confession in an email to friends and family after a taping of the TV news show 60 Minutes, during which he also implicated Lance Armstrong in the doping scandal. Hamilton then voluntarily surrendered the gold medal he won at the 2004 Summer Olympics to the United States Anti-Doping Agency, which said it would continue its joint investigative work with the IOC.

On August 10, 2012, the IOC officially stripped Hamilton of his 2004 Olympic gold medal and ordered that it be returned to them.

=== Operación Puerto ===
On June 18, 2006, the Madrid daily El País alleged that the Spanish civil guard investigation of doping in Spanish professional sport, "Operación Puerto", had found that Hamilton paid more than US$50,000 to Dr. Eufemiano Fuentes between 2002 and 2004 to plan and administer his use of performance-enhancing erythropoietin (EPO), growth hormone treatment, blood doping, and masking agents. El País charged that Hamilton's 2003 win of Liège–Bastogne–Liège came days after a "double" blood transfusion planned by Fuentes. The evidence presented by El País also implicated Hamilton's wife in facilitating Hamilton's doping. Fuentes was arrested with team director Manolo Saiz in May 2006 as part of the Operación Puerto investigation.

On June 26, 2006, Hamilton stated on his website: "I was very upset to read the accusations against me and to see my name associated with the Operación Puerto investigation in Spain. I have not been treated by Dr. Fuentes. I have not done what the article alleges. In addition, I have never been contacted by authorities in Spain regarding these allegations. Therefore, it is impossible to comment on a situation I have no knowledge of."

The Copenhagen daily, Politiken, published further charges stemming from Operación Puerto on August 19, 2006. The article summarizes Hamilton's alleged doping program during 2003. It quotes Danish doping researcher Rasmus Damsgaard on the organization Hamilton's program would have required. It cites Bjarne Riis, Hamilton's directeur sportif in 2003, denying knowledge of Hamilton's doping. And the article states that the reporters attempted to contact Hamilton on numerous occasions but were unable to reach him. The article's allegations are based on the rider's doping and racing calendar obtained by the paper. The calendar was seized in Operación Puerto. The doping calendar indicates use of EPO, growth hormone, testosterone, blood doping, and insulin on 114 days over seven months during the 2003 season. The racing program correlates with Hamilton's races in 2003, according to Politiken. The calendar includes two blood transfusions during the Tour de France. “The first time before the three stages in the Alps and the second before the 12th stage – a 47 km individual time trial,” write the reporters. The article stated that such an ambitious program would have required assistance – “at least four or five people,” according to Damsgaard.

The next day, August 20, 2006, the Belgian Dutch language Het Laatste Nieuws newspaper published more details of Hamilton's doping diary. Among many allegations, the article claims he took EPO 30 times between December 2002 and February 2003 while riding for Team CSC. In 2003, claimed Het Laatste Nieuws, Hamilton used doping on 114 of his 200 racing days.

On September 14, 2006, USA Cycling announced information from the UCI "regarding Tyler Hamilton and his alleged involvement in 'Operación Puerto' along with a request to move forward with disciplinary action." USA Cycling referred the case to the U.S. Anti-Doping Agency.

On April 30, 2007, La Gazzetta dello Sport published allegations that Spanish authorities had completed a second dossier on Operation Puerto, 6000 pages long and naming 49 cyclists. Hamilton was again named, with the detail that he was #11 on Dr. Fuentes's coded list of clients.

Hamilton did not admit any wrongdoing at the time, and his defense was based on personal integrity. As US cyclist Bobby Julich who finished third in the Athens time trial that Hamilton won noted:

"It goes against everything I've ever seen or known from the guy. But the rest of us at the Olympics passed the test. Why didn't he? I'm sick of people who cheat, sick of cleaning up their mess and trying to explain it. There is heavy evidence against him. With that much evidence, I don't know how he's going to get out of it."

Ironically, Julich confessed in 2012 that he doped during his career. The same year, Hamilton published a book, The Secret Race, where he admits he was the client "4142" in Fuentes' documents.

=== Return to cycling ===
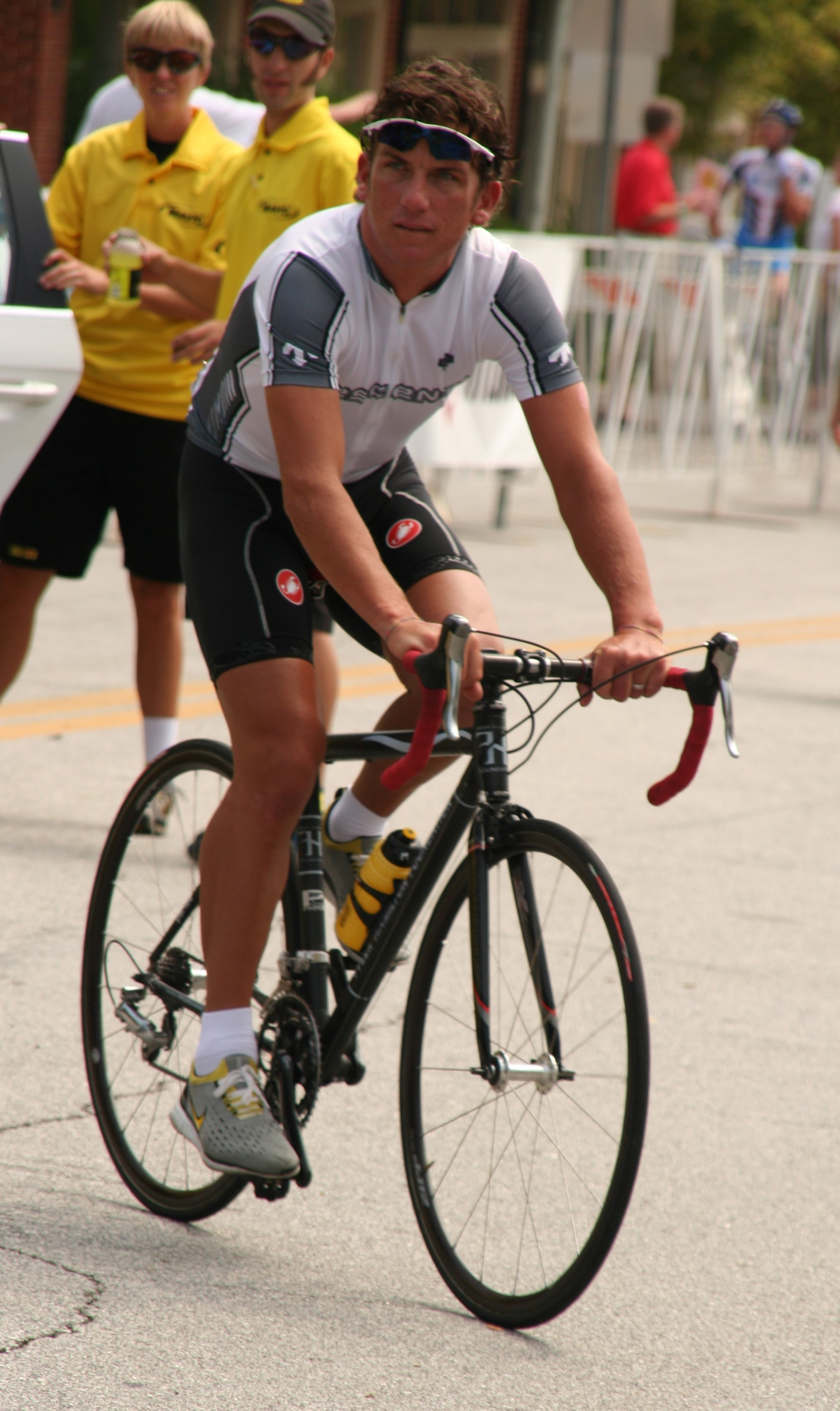
Hamilton in November 2007

Beginning in spring 2007, Hamilton began cycling again, having completed his two-year ban. He rode briefly for Tinkoff Credit Systems. It supported Hamilton in the face of Operation Puerto rumors. However, on May 9, with rumors circulating about Hamilton's role in the April 30 dossier, the team dropped him for the 2007 Giro d'Italia.

In September 2007, Tyler competed at the US national championship in Greenville, SC, coming sixth in the time trial and 12th in the road race. In December, Rock Racing said Hamilton would ride for them in 2008. Rock Racing was a professional team on the US circuit. Hamilton did not ride in the team's season-opening Tour of California because of that race's rules against riders involved in doping investigations.

Wearing his Rock Racing gear, Tyler Hamilton finished second of approximately 60 category one and two riders March 9, 2008 at a collegiate criterium in Denver's City Park.

In July 2008 he won the Tour of Qinghai Lake in China which is a top ranked race (UCI 2.HC). In August 2008 he won the US National Road Race Championship.

=== Second positive test ===
On April 17, 2009 it was revealed that Tyler had failed an out-of-competition drug test; this time for a banned steroid (DHEA), which he claimed to be taking for anti-depression purposes despite knowing that it is on the World Anti-Doping Agency banned list. He announced his decision to retire. In June 2009, Hamilton was given an eight-year ban after testing positive for a banned anti-depressant.

=== Tyler Hamilton Training ===
Since September 2009, Hamilton has been providing private training services to other cyclists.

=== Autobiography ===
On September 5, 2012, Random House (Bantam Books) published Hamilton's memoir The Secret Race: Inside the Hidden World of the Tour de France: Doping, Cover-ups, and Winning at All Costs, coauthored with American writer Daniel Coyle. It won the 2012 William Hill Sports Book of the Year award. In the book, he details his career and his relationship with Lance Armstrong, for whom he was a teammate and a confidant. It also details some of the doping practices he and Armstrong were using on the U.S. Postal Service team, such as EPO injections and blood transfusions. They parted ways when Hamilton went riding for CSC. This decision was motivated by the fact that Armstrong had become cold and vindictive toward him. Hamilton then recounts the 2 years spent riding for Bjarne Riis, his sympathy for the former rider and how Riis introduced him to Eufemiano Fuentes, a Spanish doctor who would be later investigated in the Operacion Puerto doping affair. He then recounts his years on the Phonak Team when he tested positive during the Vuelta a España to an alleged homologous blood transfusion.

Despite admitting throughout the work that he very regularly used EPO, testosterone pills and patches, and autologous blood transfusions (all banned practices), Hamilton staunchly opposed the sanction, since he had never used the blood of another person. It was speculated that Fuentes and his assistant had mixed the blood of another rider with his. His career in shambles, he raced for lesser teams after his suspension, tested positive for DHEA (in an OTC herbal anti-depressant) and retired. He later received a call from federal investigator Jeff Novitzky, who wanted to talk to him. He refused and was served a subpoena, whereupon he decided to tell everything. Some former teammates of Lance Armstrong and other witnesses appeared, until the federal government dropped the charges. The USADA took over the investigation under civil law, and Armstrong was ultimately stripped of all his titles from August 1998 onward. Armstrong was also banned from bicycle racing and triathlon competition.

== Major results ==
1996
1st Overall Teleflex Tour

1st Stage 3

1st Overall Fitchburg Longsjo Classic
2nd Hamilton Classic
7th USPRO Championship
1997
1st Mount Washington Auto Road Bicycle Hillclimb
6th Overall Circuit de la Sarthe
1998
5th Overall Tour of Britain
7th First Union Classic
9th Overall Circuit de la Sarthe
1999
1st Overall Danmark Rundt

1st Stage 4b (ITT)

1st Mount Washington Auto Road Bicycle Hillclimb
5th Overall Circuit de la Sarthe
7th Grand Prix Eddy Merckx
2000
1st Overall Critérium du Dauphiné Libéré

1st Points classification
1st Stages 4 & 5

4th Overall Ronde van Nederland

1st Stage 4 (ITT)

5th Grand Prix des Nations
9th Classique des Alpes
10th Time trial, Olympic Games
2001
8th Euskal Bizikleta
2002
2nd Overall Giro d'Italia

1st Stage 14 (ITT)

4th Overall Danmark Rundt
10th Overall Ronde van Nederland
2003
1st Overall Tour de Romandie

1st Stage 5 (ITT)

1st Liège–Bastogne–Liège
1st Mountains classification Paris–Nice
2nd Overall Tour of the Basque Country
4th Overall Tour de France

1st Stage 16

6th Overall Critérium International
2004
~~1st Time trial, Olympic Games~~
1st Overall Tour de Romandie

1st Points classification
1st Stage 5 (ITT)

~~1st Stage 8 (ITT) Vuelta a España~~
2nd Overall Critérium du Dauphiné Libéré
9th Liège–Bastogne–Liège
2005
1st Mount Washington Auto Road Bicycle Hillclimb
2006
1st Mount Washington Auto Road Bicycle Hillclimb
2008
1st Road race, National Road Championships
1st Overall Tour of Qinghai Lake

1st Stage 8

=== Grand Tour general classification results timeline ===
Grand Tour	1997	1998	1999	2000	2001	2002	2003	2004
Giro d'Italia	—	—	—	—	—	2	—	—
Tour de France	69	51	13	25	94	15	4	DNF
Vuelta a España	—	—	DNF	—	—	—	—	DNF

Legend
—	Did not compete
DNF	Did not finish

== Bibliography ==
- Tyler Hamilton, Daniel Coyle: The Secret Race (ISBN 9780345530417), Bantam Books 2012.

== See also ==
- List of doping cases in cycling

Sporting positions
Preceded by Levi Leipheimer	USA National Road Race Champion; 2008	Succeeded by George Hincapie
