= Leonardo Piepoli =

Swiss-Italian cyclist

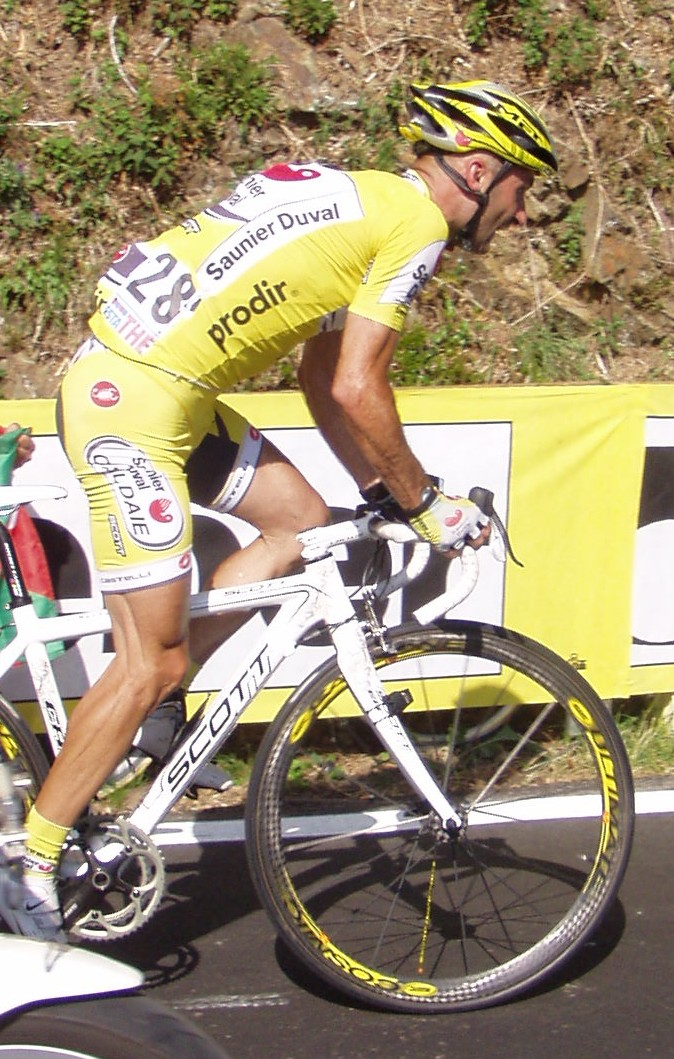
- Piepoli at the 2007 Giro d'Italia

Personal information
- Full name: Leonardo Piepoli
- Born: 29 September 1971 (age 55) La Chaux-de-Fonds, Switzerland
- Height: 1.69 m (5 ft 7 in)
- Weight: 54 kg (119 lb; 8.5 st)

Cycling career
- Sport: Cycling
- Discipline: Road
- Role: Rider
- Rider type: Climber

Professional teams
- 1995–1997: Refin–Mobilvetta
- 1998: Saeco–Cannondale
- 1999–2003: Banesto
- 2004–2008: Saunier Duval–Prodir

Major wins
- Grand Tours Giro d'Italia Mountains classification (2007) 3 individual stages (2006, 2007) Vuelta a España 2 individual stages (2004, 2007) Stage races Vuelta a Burgos (2000)

Leonardo Piepoli (born 29 September 1971) is a former Italian professional road racing cyclist. He most recently rode for Saunier Duval–Scott on the UCI ProTour, but had his contract suspended in July 2008 during the Tour de France amid allegations of the use of the blood boosting drug EPO in the team. He was later suspended for two years, which effectively ended his career.

== Career ==
He is a record four-time winner (1995, 1999, 2003, 2004) of the Subida a Urkiola. Piepoli is a specialist climber, and this was shown in the 2006 Giro d'Italia, where he was one of the strongest riders in the mountains and won two stages. In the 2007 Giro d'Italia, Piepoli won the mountains classification. He has won stages in the Giro and the Vuelta a España. He also made himself famous by 'gifting' two stage victories to his team-mates Gilberto Simoni and Riccardo Riccò. During the Vuelta, Piepoli lead the mountains classification, but was forced to leave the race, citing 'family problems'

During the 2008 Giro d'Italia Piepoli crashed two times, leaving the race with three broken ribs and with his left hand fractured in two places.

In the 2008 Tour de France, Piepoli won the 10th stage, a mountain stage that climbed the legendary Hautacam, and also helped his team-mate Riccardo Riccò win two stages. Before the twelfth stage, Piepoli and the rest of his team stepped out of the race, after Riccò had tested positive for doping.

== Doping allegations ==
Piepoli was fired from Saunier Duval on 18 July 2008, for what his team called "violation of the team's ethical code." The Spanish newspaper El Pais reported that Piepoli had confessed to EPO usage, using the same third generation form (CERA) for which his teammate Riccardo Riccò tested positive, but he denied this at the Italian National Olympic Committee's investigation into Riccò's case. On 6 October 2008, it was announced that two of Piepoli's samples from the Tour de France had also tested positive for CERA EPO. In a 7 January 2009 interview with the Italian newspaper Gazzetta dello Sport, Piepoli acknowledged that he had used CERA in "a moment of weakness". In January 2009, he was suspended from the sport for two years.

== Major results ==
1993
9th Giro del Belvedere
1994
1st Overall Giro Ciclistico d'Italia
1995
1st Subida a Urkiola
1st Trofeo dello Scalatore
2nd Giro del Lazio
6th Clásica de San Sebastián
6th Gran Premio Città di Camaiore
7th Overall Tour de Suisse

1st Mountains classification

7th Coppa Agostoni
1996
1st Stage 4 Giro del Trentino
8th Tour de Berne
1997
3rd Overall Giro del Trentino
3rd Trofeo dello Scalatore
5th Giro di Toscana
1998
1st Trofeo dello Scalatore
2nd Overall Vuelta a Burgos

1st Stage 4

3rd Clásica de San Sebastián
4th Overall Tour de Suisse
4th Overall Vuelta a Aragón
5th Gran Premio Città di Camaiore
9th Giro dell'Appennino
1999
1st Overall Vuelta a Castilla y León

1st Stage 2

1st Subida a Urkiola
3rd Overall Vuelta a Aragón
4th Overall Vuelta a Burgos

1st Stage 4

8th Overall Vuelta a España
8th Overall Tour de Romandie
2000
1st Overall Vuelta a Burgos

1st Mountains classification
1st Stage 3

1st Overall Vuelta a Aragón

1st Stage 2

1st Stage 2 Critérium International
2nd Subida a Urkiola
3rd Overall Volta a Catalunya
6th Overall Volta a Comunidade Galega
10th Overall Giro d'Italia
2001
2nd Overall Giro del Trentino
9th Overall Volta a la Comunitat Valenciana
9th Overall Setmana Catalana de Ciclisme
10th Overall Critérium du Dauphiné Libéré
2002
1st Overall Vuelta a Asturias

1st Stage 4

1st Overall Vuelta a Aragón

1st Stage 1

3rd Overall Vuelta a Castilla y León
6th Overall Volta a Catalunya
9th Overall Setmana Catalana de Ciclisme
2003
1st Overall Vuelta a Aragón

1st Stage 1

1st Subida a Urkiola
1st Subida al Naranco
4th Overall Setmana Catalana de Ciclisme
7th Overall Euskal Bizikleta
9th Overall Clásica Internacional de Alcobendas
2004
1st Subida a Urkiola
1st Stage 9 Vuelta a España
3rd Overall Tour de Romandie
3rd Overall Vuelta a Burgos
3rd Overall Vuelta a Aragón
3rd Subida al Naranco
4th Overall Vuelta a Asturias
4th Overall Volta a la Comunitat Valenciana
10th Overall Setmana Catalana de Ciclisme
10th Overall Euskal Bizikleta
2005
2nd Overall Volta a Catalunya

1st Stage 4

10th Overall Tour de Suisse
2006
Giro d'Italia

1st Stage 13 & 17

8th Overall Critérium du Dauphiné Libéré
2007
Giro d'Italia

1st Mountains classification
1st Stage 10

1st Stage 9 Vuelta a España
2008
~~1st Stage 10 Tour de France~~

=== Grand Tour general classification results timeline ===
Grand Tour	1995	1996	1997	1998	1999	2000	2001	2002	2003	2004	2005	2006	2007	2008
Giro d'Italia	DNF	38	DNF	16	DNF	10	DNF	—	—	—	—	11	14	DNF
Tour de France	—	17	—	14	—	DNF	44	—	—	—	23	—	—	DNF
Vuelta a España	—	—	26	—	8	—	—	—	23	27	35	13	DNF	—

Legend
—	Did not compete
DNF	Did not finish

== See also ==
- List of doping cases in cycling
