= 2004 Critérium du Dauphiné Libéré =

Race details
- Dates: 6–13 June 2004
- Stages: 7 + Prologue
- Distance: 1,112 km (691 mi)
- Winning time: 29h 27' 15"

Results
Jersey awarded to the overall winner	Winner	Iban Mayo (ESP)	(Euskaltel–Euskadi)
	Second	Tyler Hamilton (USA)	(Phonak)
	Third	Óscar Sevilla (ESP)	(Phonak)
Jersey awarded to the points classification winner	Points	Stuart O'Grady (AUS)	(Cofidis)
Jersey awarded to the mountains classification winner	Mountains	Michael Rasmussen (DEN)	(Rabobank)
Jersey awarded to the combination classification winner	Combination	José Enrique Gutiérrez (ESP)	(Phonak)
	Team	Phonak	

The 2004 Critérium du Dauphiné Libéré was the 56th edition of the Critérium du Dauphiné Libéré cycle race and was held from 6 June to 13 June 2004. The race started in Megève and finished in Grenoble. The race was won by Iban Mayo of the Euskaltel–Euskadi team.

== Teams ==
Twelve teams, containing a total of 95 riders, participated in the race:

- U.S. Postal Service
- Crédit Agricole
- Phonak
- Quick-Step–Davitamon
- Euskaltel–Euskadi
- Cofidis
- Team CSC
- AG2R Prévoyance
- Rabobank
- FDJeux.com
- Brioches La Boulangère
- R.A.G.T. Semences–MG Rover

== Route ==
Stage characteristics and winners
Stage	Date	Course	Distance	Type	Winner
P	6 June	Megève	5.4 km (3.4 mi)	Individual time trial	Iban Mayo (ESP)
1	7 June	Megève to Bron	231 km (144 mi)		Thor Hushovd (NOR)
2	8 June	Bron to Saint-Étienne	181 km (112 mi)		José Enrique Gutiérrez (ESP)
3	9 June	Saint-Étienne to Aubenas	180 km (110 mi)		Nicolas Portal (FRA)
4	10 June	Bédoin to Mont Ventoux	21.6 km (13.4 mi)	Individual time trial	Iban Mayo (ESP)
5	11 June	Bollène to Sisteron	149 km (93 mi)		Stuart O'Grady (AUS)
6	12 June	Gap to Grenoble	144 km (89 mi)		Michael Rasmussen (DEN)
7	13 June	Grenoble to Grenoble	200 km (120 mi)		Stuart O'Grady (AUS)

== General classification ==
Final general classification

Rank	Rider	Team	Time
1	Iban Mayo (ESP)	Euskaltel–Euskadi	29h 27' 15"
2	Tyler Hamilton (USA)	Phonak	+ 36"
3	Óscar Sevilla (ESP)	Phonak	+ 1' 14"
~~4~~	~~Lance Armstrong (USA)~~	~~U.S. Postal Service~~	~~+ 2' 00"~~ (Note: In 2012, Lance Armstrong was disqualified from his position in the race. He was stripped of all results after 1 August 1998, as a consequence of the Lance Armstrong doping case.)
5	Juan Miguel Mercado (ESP)	Quick-Step–Davitamon	+ 2' 32"
6	José Enrique Gutiérrez (ESP)	Phonak	+ 2' 36"
7	Michael Rasmussen (DEN)	Rabobank	+ 2' 39"
~~8~~	~~Levi Leipheimer (USA)~~	~~Rabobank~~	~~+ 3' 33"~~ (Note: Levi Leipheimer, initially eighth, was disqualified by the UCI.)
9	Óscar Pereiro (ESP)	Phonak	+ 3' 58"
10	Iñigo Landaluze (ESP)	Euskaltel–Euskadi	+ 4' 02"
