= 1999 Vuelta a Burgos =

Race details
- Dates: 16–20 August 1999
- Stages: 5
- Distance: 686.8 km (426.8 mi)
- Winning time: 16h 29' 37"

Results
	Winner	Abraham Olano (ESP)	(ONCE–Deutsche Bank)
	Second	Dario Frigo (ITA)	(Saeco–Cannondale)
	Third	Laurent Dufaux (SUI)	(Saeco–Cannondale)

The 1999 Vuelta a Burgos was the 21st edition of the Vuelta a Burgos road cycling stage race, which was held from 16 August to 20 August 1999. The race started in Milagros and finished in Burgos. The race was won by Abraham Olano of the ONCE–Deutsche Bank team.

== General classification ==
Final general classification

Rank	Rider	Team	Time
1	Abraham Olano (ESP)	ONCE–Deutsche Bank	16h 29' 37"
2	Dario Frigo (ITA)	Saeco–Cannondale	+ 9"
3	Laurent Dufaux (SUI)	Saeco–Cannondale	+ 25"
4	Leonardo Piepoli (ITA)	Banesto	+ 33"
5	David Plaza (ESP)	Benfica–Winterthur	+ 34"
6	Igor González de Galdeano (ESP)	Vitalicio Seguros	+ 43"
7	Aitor Osa (ESP)	Banesto	+ 1' 00"
8	José María Jiménez (ESP)	Banesto	+ 1' 04"
9	Haimar Zubeldia (ESP)	Euskaltel–Euskadi	+ 1' 06"
10	Manuel Beltrán (ESP)	Banesto	+ 1' 14"
