= 1996 Volta a Catalunya =

Race details
- Dates: 13–20 June 1996
- Stages: 7 + Prologue
- Distance: 886.2 km (550.7 mi)
- Winning time: 24h 45' 29"

Results
	Winner	Alex Zülle (SUI)	(ONCE)
	Second	Patrick Jonker (AUS)	(ONCE)
	Third	Marco Fincato (ITA)	(Roslotto–ZG Mobili)
	Mountains	Laudelino Cubino (ESP)	(Kelme–Artiach)
	Sprints	Marcel Wüst (GER)	(MX Onda)
	Team	ONCE	

The 1996 Volta a Catalunya was the 76th edition of the Volta a Catalunya cycle race and was held from 13 June to 20 June 1996. The race started in Platja d'Aro and finished in Igualada. The race was won by Alex Zülle of the ONCE team.

== General classification ==
Final general classification

Rank	Rider	Team	Time
1	Alex Zülle (SUI)	ONCE	24h 45' 29"
2	Patrick Jonker (AUS)	ONCE	+ 1' 08"
3	Marco Fincato (ITA)	Roslotto–ZG Mobili	+ 4' 23"
4	Massimiliano Gentili (ITA)	Cantina Tollo–Co.Bo.	+ 7' 05"
5	Laudelino Cubino (ESP)	Kelme–Artiach	+ 7' 40"
6	Bo Hamburger (DEN)	TVM–Farm Frites	+ 7' 46"
7	Marcelino García (ESP)	ONCE	+ 8' 27"
8	Roberto Pistore (ITA)	MG Maglificio–Technogym	+ 8' 55"
9	Marco Saligari (ITA)	MG Maglificio–Technogym	+ 9' 55"
10	Paolo Savoldelli (ITA)	Roslotto–ZG Mobili	+ 10' 17"
