= 2003 Liège–Bastogne–Liège =

Race details
- Dates: 27 April 2003
- Stages: 1
- Distance: 258.5 km (160.6 mi)
- Winning time: 6h 28' 50"

Results
	Winner	Tyler Hamilton (USA)	(Team CSC)
	Second	Iban Mayo (ESP)	(Euskaltel–Euskadi)
	Third	Michael Boogerd (NED)	(Rabobank)

The 2003 Liège–Bastogne–Liège was the 89th edition of the Liège–Bastogne–Liège cycle race and was held on 27 April 2003. The race started in Liège and finished in Ans. The race was won by Tyler Hamilton of the CSC team.

== General classification ==
Final general classification

Rank	Rider	Team	Time
1	Tyler Hamilton (USA)	Team CSC	6h 28' 50"
2	Iban Mayo (ESP)	Euskaltel–Euskadi	+ 12"
3	Michael Boogerd (NED)	Rabobank	+ 14"
4	Michele Scarponi (ITA)	De Nardi–Colpack	+ 21"
5	Francesco Casagrande (ITA)	Lampre	+ 29"
6	Samuel Sánchez (ESP)	Euskaltel–Euskadi	+ 29"
7	Javier Pascual Rodríguez (ESP)	iBanesto.com	+ 29"
8	Danilo Di Luca (ITA)	Saeco	+ 29"
9	Eddy Mazzoleni (ITA)	Vini Caldirola–So.di	+ 29"
10	Ivan Basso (ITA)	Fassa Bortolo	+ 29"
