= 1998 Vuelta a Burgos =

Race details
- Dates: 10–14 August 1998
- Stages: 5
- Distance: 692 km (430.0 mi)
- Winning time: 17h 38' 21"

Results
	Winner	Abraham Olano (ESP)	(Banesto)
	Second	Leonardo Piepoli (ITA)	(Saeco–Cannondale)
	Third	Ángel Casero (ESP)	(Vitalicio Seguros)

The 1998 Vuelta a Burgos was the 20th edition of the Vuelta a Burgos road cycling stage race, which was held from 10 August to 14 August 1998. The race started in Miranda de Ebro and finished in Burgos. The race was won by Abraham Olano of the Banesto team.

== General classification ==
Final general classification

Rank	Rider	Team	Time
1	Abraham Olano (ESP)	Banesto	17h 38' 21"
2	Leonardo Piepoli (ITA)	Saeco–Cannondale	+ 56"
3	Ángel Casero (ESP)	Vitalicio Seguros	+ 1' 21"
4	Fernando Escartín (ESP)	Kelme–Costa Blanca	+ 1' 49"
5	Álvaro González de Galdeano (ESP)	Euskaltel–Euskadi	+ 1' 51"
6	Manuel Beltrán (ESP)	Banesto	+ 1' 54"
7	José María Jiménez (ESP)	Banesto	+ 2' 05"
8	Luis Pérez Rodríguez (ESP)	ONCE	+ 2' 21"
9	Andrey Teteryuk (KAZ)	Lotto–Mobistar	+ 2' 22"
10	Marco Fincato (ITA)	Mercatone Uno–Bianchi	+ 2' 26"
