= 2005 Vuelta a Burgos =

Race details
- Dates: 7–11 August 2005
- Stages: 5
- Distance: 633.55 km (393.7 mi)
- Winning time: 16h 11' 44"

Results
	Winner	Juan Carlos Domínguez (ESP)	(Saunier Duval–Prodir)
	Second	Joaquim Rodríguez (ESP)	(Saunier Duval–Prodir)
	Third	Carlos Castaño Panadero (ESP)	(Andalucía–Paul Versan)

The 2005 Vuelta a Burgos was the 27th edition of the Vuelta a Burgos road cycling stage race, which was held from 7 August to 11 August 2005. The race started and finished in Burgos. The race was won by Juan Carlos Domínguez of the Saunier Duval–Prodir team.

== General classification ==
Final general classification

Rank	Rider	Team	Time
1	Juan Carlos Domínguez (ESP)	Saunier Duval–Prodir	16h 11' 44"
2	Joaquim Rodríguez (ESP)	Saunier Duval–Prodir	+ 29"
3	Carlos Castaño Panadero (ITA)	Andalucía–Paul Versan	+ 45"
4	Santo Anzà (ITA)	Acqua & Sapone–Adria Mobil	+ 1' 01"
5	Antonio Colom (ESP)	Illes Balears–Caisse d'Epargne	+ 1' 08"
6	Josep Jufré (ESP)	Relax–Fuenlabrada	+ 1' 10"
7	Michele Scarponi (ITA)	Liberty Seguros–Würth	+ 1' 13"
8	Aitor Osa (ESP)	Liberty Seguros–Würth	+ 1' 28"
9	Moisés Dueñas (ESP)	Relax–Fuenlabrada	+ 1' 34"
10	Ezequiel Mosquera (ESP)	Kaiku	+ 1' 36"
