= 1999 Vuelta a Asturias =

Race details
- Dates: 11–16 May 1999
- Stages: 6
- Distance: 984.3 km (611.6 mi)
- Winning time: 24h 33' 24"

Results
Jersey awarded to the overall winner	Winner	Juan Carlos Domínguez (ESP)	(Vitalicio Seguros)
	Second	Roberto Laiseka (ESP)	(Euskaltel–Euskadi)
	Third	Fernando Escartín (ESP)	(Kelme–Costa Blanca)

The 1999 Vuelta a Asturias was the 43rd edition of the Vuelta a Asturias road cycling stage race, which was held from 11 May to 16 May 1999. The race started in Gijón and finished in Oviedo. The race was won by Juan Carlos Domínguez of the Vitalicio Seguros team.

== General classification ==
Final general classification

Rank	Rider	Team	Time
1	Juan Carlos Domínguez (ESP)	Vitalicio Seguros	24h 33' 24"
2	Roberto Laiseka (ESP)	Euskaltel–Euskadi	+ 58"
3	Fernando Escartín (ESP)	Kelme–Costa Blanca	+ 59"
4	Manuel Beltrán (ESP)	Banesto	+ 1' 06"
5	Ángel Casero (ESP)	Vitalicio Seguros	+ 1' 54"
6	Ángel Vicioso (ESP)	Kelme–Costa Blanca	+ 2' 47"
7	Txema del Olmo (ESP)	Euskaltel–Euskadi	+ 2' 57"
8	Laurent Brochard (FRA)	Festina–Lotus	+ 2' 59"
9	Joaquin Gomes Oliveira (POR)	LA Alumínios–Pecol	+ 3' 30"
10	Álvaro González de Galdeano (ESP)	Vitalicio Seguros	+ 3' 46"
