= Dave Bruylandts =

Belgian cyclist (born 1976)

Personal information
- Full name: Dave Bruylandts
- Born: 12 July 1976 (age 50) Lier, Belgium

Cycling career
- Sport: Cycling
- Discipline: Road
- Role: Rider

Professional teams
- 1999–2000: Palmans–Ideal
- 2001–2002: Domo–Farm Frites–Latexco
- 2003–2004: Marlux–Wincor Nixdorf
- 2006: Unibet.com
- 2007: Klaipėda–Splendid Cyclingteam

Dave Bruylandts (born 12 July 1976 in Lier) is a Belgian former professional road bicycle racer. Bruylandts was tested positive for EPO use in 2004 and was banned for 18 months. Following his ban, Bruylandts briefly rode for Unibet.com in 2006 and for the UCI Continental team Klaipėda-Splendid Cyclingteam in 2007. Bruylandts is married to racing cyclist Femke Melis.

== Career achievements ==
=== Major results ===
1996
3rd Road race, National Under-23 Road Championships
1997
2nd Vlaamse Havenpijl
1998
1st Overall Ronde van Antwerpen
2nd Road race, National Under-23 Road Championships
1999
1st Nationale Sluitingsprijs
1st Leeuwse Pijl
3rd Grand Prix de Fourmies
7th Giro dell'Emilia
8th Grote Prijs Jef Scherens
2000
1st Overall Circuito Montañés

1st Stage 2
1st Stage 5

1st Schynberg Rundfahrt Sulz
1st Grote Prijs Jef Scherens
2nd GP Stad Zottegem
3rd Overall Vuelta a Castilla y León

1st Stage 3

3rd A Travers le Morbihan
4th Overall Circuit Franco-Belge
4th Circuito de Getxo
4th Grand Prix de Wallonie
5th Druivenkoers-Overijse
5th Grand Prix d'Isbergues
7th Overall Vuelta a Burgos
8th GP Rik Van Steenbergen
8th Rund um Köln
9th Overall Tour de Luxembourg
10th Overall Vuelta a Murcia
2001
1st Mountains classification Vuelta a Andalucía
4th De Brabantse Pijl
2002
1st Grand Prix de Wallonie
2nd Grand Prix Pino Cerami
4th Tour de Berne
5th Overall Route du Sud

1st Stage 4

8th De Brabantse Pijl
2003
1st Grand Prix de Wallonie
1st Giro d'Oro
1st Stage 3 Vuelta a Burgos
1st Schriek, Derny
2nd Subida a Urkiola
2nd GP Industria Artigianato e Commercio Carnaghese
3rd Overall Tour de Pologne
3rd Overall Circuit Franco-Belge
4th De Brabantse Pijl
4th Nokere-Koerse
5th Overall Tour of Belgium

1st Stage 5

5th Overall Grote Prijs Erik Breukink
10th Tour of Flanders
2004
3rd Tour of Flanders
3rd Overall Tour de Langkawi
4th Dwars door Vlaanderen
4th Grand Prix Pino Cerami
2007
1st Zuidkempense Pijl
1st Dwars door het Hageland
1st Stage 4 Triptyque Ardennaise
1st Stage 3 Tour de Namur
2008
2nd Grand Prix Criquielion
5th De Vlaamse Pijl

=== Grand Tour general classification results timeline ===
Grand Tour	2001	2002
Giro d'Italia	—	—
Tour de France	—	DNF
Vuelta a España	51	56

== See also ==
- List of doping cases in cycling
