= 2001 Vuelta a Asturias =

Race details
- Dates: 15–20 May 2001
- Stages: 6
- Distance: 810.8 km (503.8 mi)
- Winning time: 22h 31' 46"

Results
Jersey awarded to the overall winner	Winner	Juan Carlos Domínguez (ESP)	(iBanesto.com)
	Second	Joan Horrach (ESP)	(Milaneza–MSS)
	Third	Alex Zülle (SUI)	(Team Coast–Buffalo)

The 2001 Vuelta a Asturias was the 45th edition of the Vuelta a Asturias road cycling stage race, which was held from 15 May to 20 May 2001. The race started in Oviedo and finished at the Alto del Naranco. The race was won by Juan Carlos Domínguez of the iBanesto.com team.

== General classification ==
Final general classification

Rank	Rider	Team	Time
1	Juan Carlos Domínguez (ESP)	iBanesto.com	22h 31' 46"
2	Joan Horrach (ESP)	Milaneza–MSS	+ 56"
3	Alex Zülle (SUI)	Team Coast–Buffalo	+ 1' 12"
4	Roberto Laiseka (ESP)	Euskaltel–Euskadi	s.t.
5	Bingen Fernández (ESP)	Euskaltel–Euskadi	+ 1' 20"
6	Alberto López (ESP)	Euskaltel–Euskadi	+ 1' 40"
7	Aitor Kintana (ESP)	Jazztel–Costa de Almería	+ 1' 52"
8	Ramón González Arrieta (ESP)	Euskaltel–Euskadi	+ 2' 05"
9	Fernando Escartín (ESP)	Team Coast–Buffalo	+ 2' 09"
10	Georg Totschnig (AUT)	Gerolsteiner	+ 2' 12"
