= Aitor Osa =

Spanish cyclist

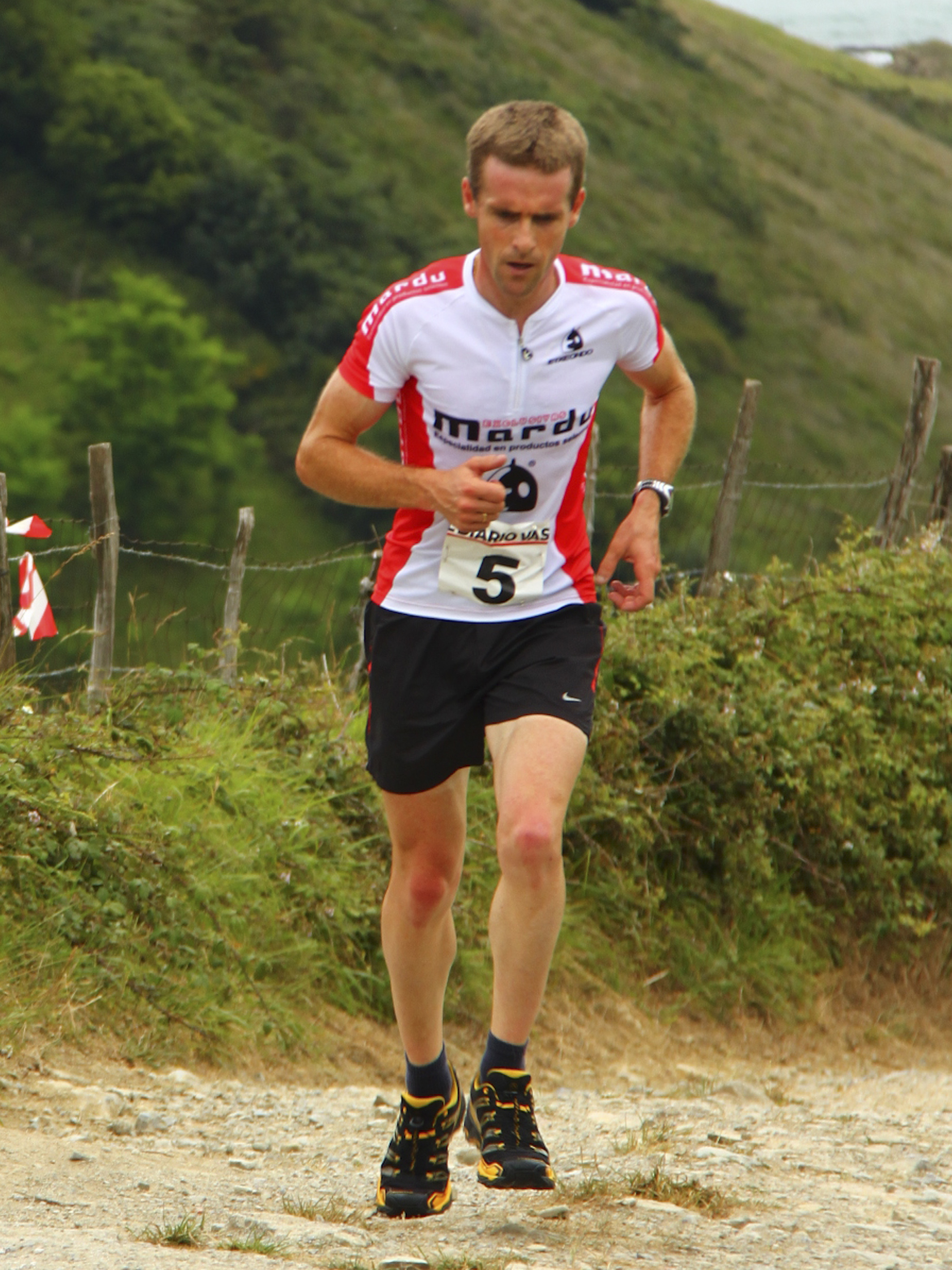
- Aitor Osa in 2010

Personal information
- Full name: Aitor Osa Eizaguirre
- Born: September 9, 1973 (age 53) Zestoa, Spain

Cycling career
- Sport: Cycling
- Discipline: Road
- Role: Rider

Professional teams
- 1994–1996: Euskadi–Petronor
- 1997–2005: Banesto
- 2006: Liberty Seguros–Würth

Major wins
- Grand Tours Vuelta a España Mountains Classification (2002) Stage races Tour of the Basque Country (2002)

Aitor Osa Eizaguirre (born September 9, 1973) is a Spanish former road bicycle racer. He is an older brother of Unai Osa. He was involved in the Operación Puerto doping case.

== Major results ==
1996
6th Overall Vuelta a La Rioja
9th GP Villafranca de Ordizia
1997
4th Overall Vuelta a los Valles Mineros
6th Subida al Naranco
7th GP Villafranca de Ordizia
1998
3rd Subida al Naranco
1999
7th Overall Vuelta a Burgos
7th Subida a Urkiola
2000
2nd Overall Vuelta a Castilla y León
3rd Overall G.P. Portugal Telecom

1st Stage 3

6th Overall Tour of the Basque Country
6th Klasika Primavera
9th Overall Critérium International
2001
5th Subida al Naranco
9th Overall Vuelta a España
2002
1st Overall Tour of the Basque Country

1st Stage 3

1st Mountains classification, Vuelta a España
1st Stage 2 Vuelta a La Rioja
1st Stage 4 Volta a Portugal
2nd Subida al Naranco
3rd Overall Vuelta a Aragón
5th Gran Premio Miguel Induráin
2003
2nd La Flèche Wallonne
4th Klasika Primavera
6th Overall Tour of the Basque Country
2004
1st Mountains classification Paris–Nice
5th Overall Vuelta a Andalucía
6th Circuito de Getxo
9th Overall Setmana Catalana de Ciclisme
2005
3rd Klasika Primavera
4th Overall Tour of the Basque Country
8th Overall Vuelta a Burgos
8th La Flèche Wallonne
2006
7th Gran Premio Miguel Induráin

=== Grand Tour general classification results timeline ===
Grand Tour	1997	1998	1999	2000	2001	2002	2003	2004	2005
Giro d'Italia	—	—	DNF	—	—	—	—	—	—
Tour de France	—	—	—	—	—	—	—	50	—
/ Vuelta a España	46	22	15	51	9	54	25	—	DNF

Legend
—	Did not compete
DNF	Did not finish

== See also ==
- List of doping cases in cycling
