= La Pineda =

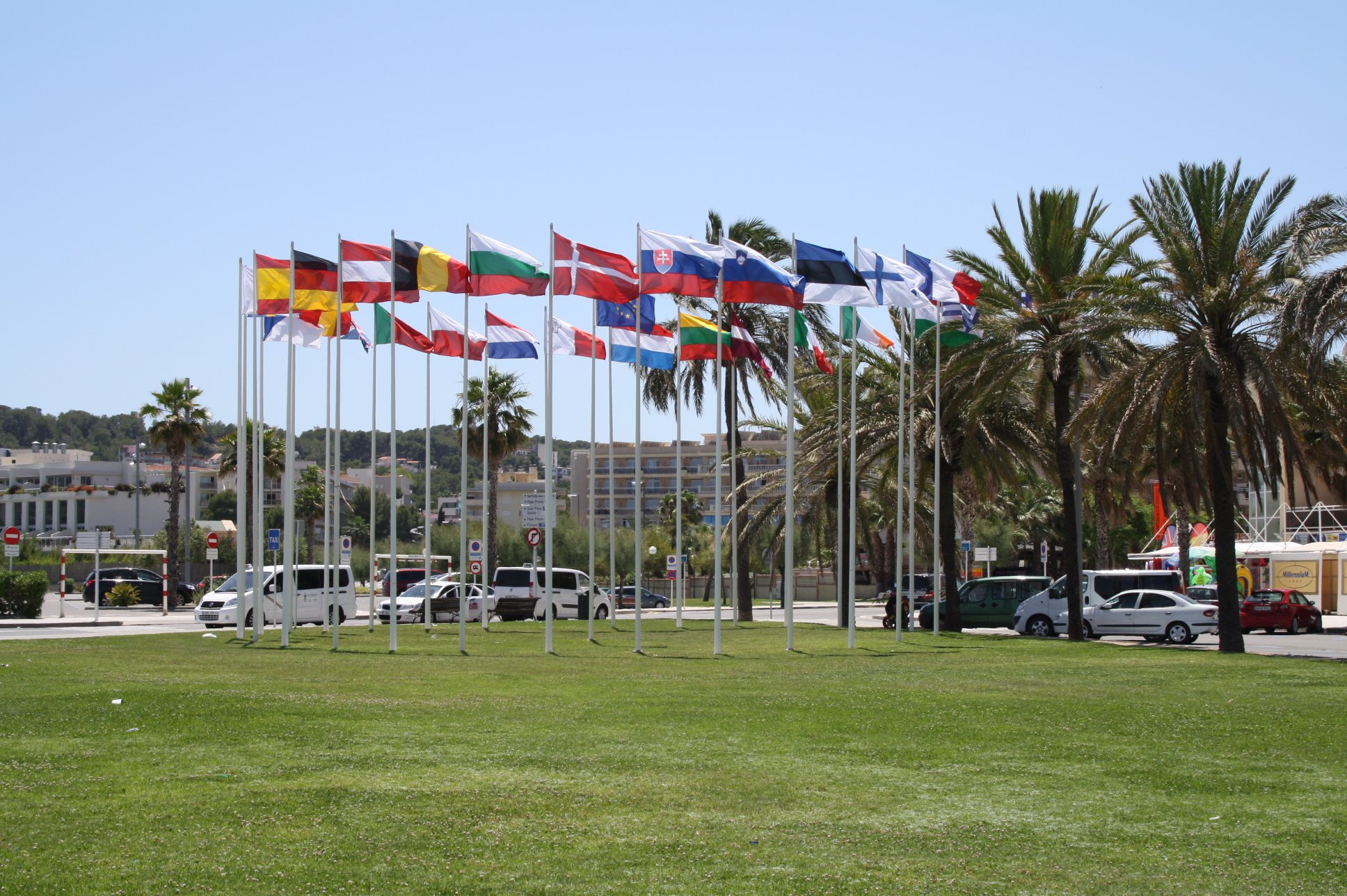

- Location of La Pineda in Spain
- Coordinates: 41°4′26.45″N 1°10′43.28″E
- Country: Spain
- Community: Catalonia
- Province: Tarragona
- Comarca: Tarragonès
- Elevation: 126 m (413 ft)
- Time zone: UTC+1 (CET)
  - Summer (DST): UTC+2 (CEST)

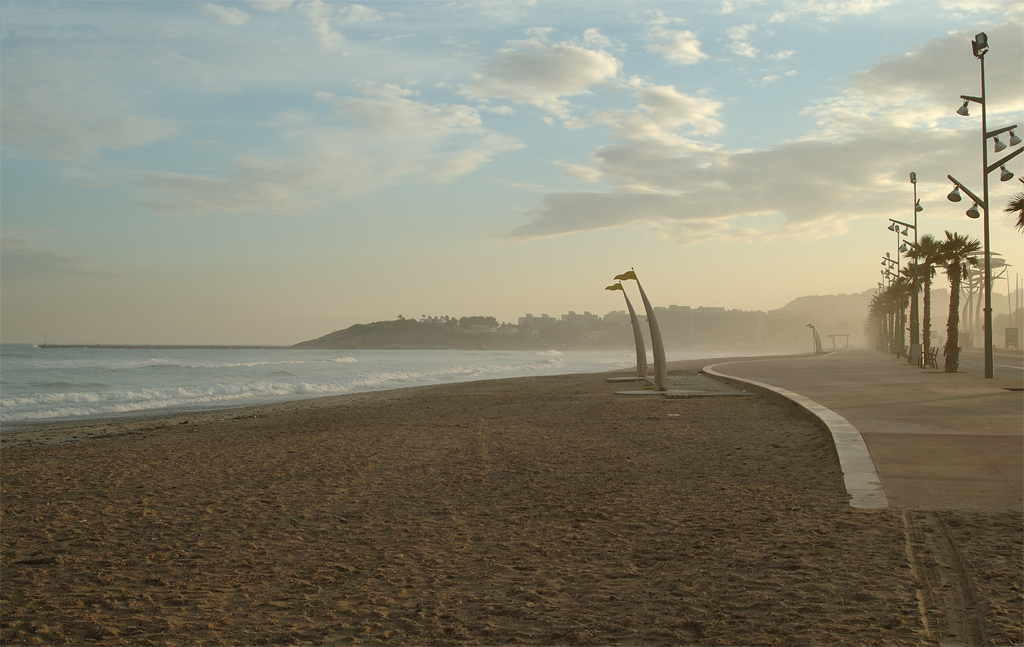
La Pineda beach

La Pineda is a coastal resort which forms part of the municipality of Vila-seca in the province of Tarragona, in Catalonia, Spain.

== Culture ==
=== Attractions ===
One of the attractions in La Pineda is a water park, "Aquopolis", in the central street. The local beaches are also very popular with tourists.

=== Beaches ===
- Platja de La Pineda
- Platja dels Prats
- Platja del Racó

== See also ==
- Salou
- Reus
