= 2003 Tour of the Basque Country =

Race details
- Dates: 7–11 April 2003
- Stages: 5
- Distance: 753 km (467.9 mi)
- Winning time: 18h 59' 23"

Results
	Winner	Iban Mayo (ESP)	(Euskaltel–Euskadi)
	Second	Tyler Hamilton (USA)	(Team CSC)
	Third	Samuel Sánchez (ESP)	(Euskaltel–Euskadi)

The 2003 Tour of the Basque Country was the 43rd edition of the Tour of the Basque Country cycle race and was held from 7 April to 11 April 2003. The race started in Legazpi and finished in Hondarribia. The race was won by Iban Mayo of the Euskaltel–Euskadi team.

== General classification ==
Final general classification

Rank	Rider	Team	Time
1	Iban Mayo (ESP)	Euskaltel–Euskadi	18h 59' 23"
2	Tyler Hamilton (USA)	Team CSC	+ 12"
3	Samuel Sánchez (ESP)	Euskaltel–Euskadi	+ 23"
4	Dario Frigo (ITA)	Fassa Bortolo	+ 1' 07"
5	Alejandro Valverde (ESP)	Kelme–Costa Blanca	+ 1' 15"
6	Aitor Osa (ESP)	iBanesto.com	+ 1' 30"
7	Michael Rasmussen (DEN)	Rabobank	+ 1' 39"
8	Wladimir Belli (ITA)	Lampre	+ 1' 46"
9	Ángel Vicioso (ESP)	ONCE–Eroski	+ 1' 51"
10	Alexander Vinokourov (KAZ)	Team Telekom	+ 2' 01"
