= Iban Mayo =

Spanish cyclist

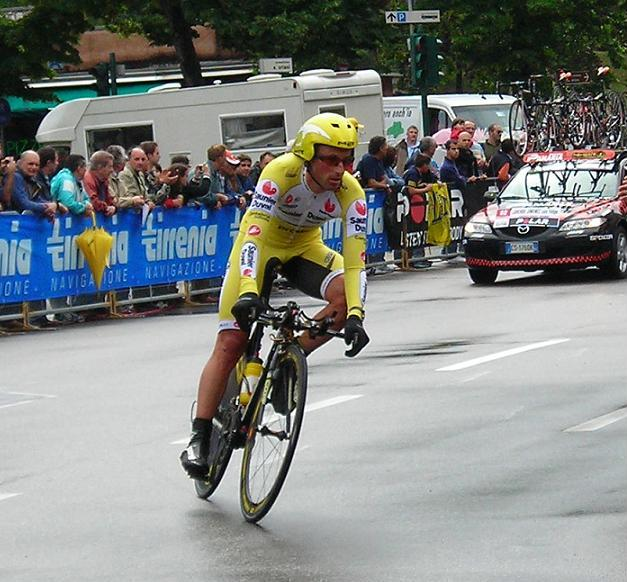
- Mayo at the 2007 Giro d'Italia

Personal information
- Full name: Iban Mayo Diez
- Nickname: El Gallo (The Rooster)
- Born: 19 August 1977 (age 49) Igorre, Spain
- Height: 1.76 m (5 ft 9 in)
- Weight: 65 kg (143 lb; 10.2 st)

Cycling career
- Sport: Cycling
- Discipline: Road
- Role: Rider
- Rider type: Climbing specialist

Professional teams
- 2000–2006: Euskaltel–Euskadi
- 2007: Saunier Duval–Prodir

Major wins
- Grand Tours Tour de France 1 individual stage (2003) Giro d'Italia 1 individual stage (2007) Stage races Tour of the Basque Country (2003) Critérium du Dauphiné Libéré (2004)

Iban Mayo Diez (born 19 August 1977 in Igorre, Basque Country, Spain) is a former professional road bicycle racer.

== Biography ==
Renowned as a climber, Mayo turned pro with Euskaltel–Euskadi in 2000, and became one of the Basque Country's prospects for glory. He stayed with Euskaltel-Euskadi throughout 2000–2006. The biggest result came in the 2003 Tour de France, when he won a stage up Alpe d'Huez. Mayo finished the Tour sixth.

In 2004 Mayo won the Critérium du Dauphiné Libéré, regarded as preparation for the Tour de France. He beat Lance Armstrong by two minutes in a time trial on Mont Ventoux, breaking the record. He was seen as a dangerous outsider for the Tour de France in the same year. It turned out a disappointment, and after losing time due to a crash, he lost more in the Pyrenees due to injuries and mononucleosis. Mayo quit before the 15th stage.

After a lackluster 2005, in 2006 he returned in the Dauphiné Libéré with second place in Briançon and a win on the stage to La Toussuire. He was seen as a contender for the 2006 Tour de France, but retired during the 11th stage. In 2007 Mayo signed for Saunier Duval–Prodir.

Mayo won the 19th stage of the 2007 Giro d'Italia. On 30 July 2007 the UCI confirmed he had failed a test for EPO during the Tour de France, in which he finished 16th. On 22 October the Spanish federation cleared Mayo after a second test proved negative. The UCI president Pat McQuaid stopped short of clearing the rider, pending further tests.

On 19 December a French laboratory confirmed the positive test. In 2008, the Court of Arbitration for Sport upheld Mayo's two-year ban, which ended on 31 July 2009.

On 13 September 2009, Mayo decided not to make a comeback to professional cycling, thus effectively ending his career.

== Career achievements ==
=== Major results ===
1995
3rd Time trial, National Junior Road Championships
4th Road race, UCI Junior Road World Championships
2001
1st Overall Grand Prix du Midi Libre
1st Classique des Alpes
1st Stage 6 Critérium du Dauphiné Libéré
3rd Overall Grande Prémio Jornal de Notícias
2002
5th Overall Vuelta a España
2003
1st Overall Tour of the Basque Country

1st Stages 1, 5a & 5b (ITT)

2nd Overall Critérium du Dauphiné Libéré

1st Points classification
1st Mountains classification
1st Combination classification
1st Prologue & Stage 4

2nd Liège–Bastogne–Liège
5th Overall Setmana Catalana de Ciclisme
6th Overall Tour de France

1st Stage 8

10th Karlsruher Versicherungs Grand Prix (with Haimar Zubeldia)
2004
1st Overall Critérium du Dauphiné Libéré

1st Prologue & Stage 4 (ITT)

1st Overall Vuelta Asturias

1st Points classification

1st Overall Clásica de Alcobendas

1st Points classification
1st Stages 1 & 2

1st Subida al Naranco
2nd Overall Tour of the Basque Country
2nd Classique des Alpes
2006
1st Overall Vuelta a Burgos

1st Stage 4

1st Subida a Urkiola
1st Stage 6 Critérium du Dauphiné Libéré
2007
1st Stage 19 Giro d'Italia

=== Grand Tour general classification results timeline ===
Grand Tour	2001	2002	2003	2004	2005	2006	2007
Giro d'Italia	—	—	—	—	—	—	38
Tour de France	—	88	6	DNF	60	DNF	16
Vuelta a España	11	5	—	—	DNF	35	—

Legend
—	Did not compete
DNF	Did not finish

== See also ==
- List of doping cases in cycling
