= 2003 Tour de Romandie =

Race details
- Dates: 29 April–4 May 2003
- Stages: 5 + Prologue
- Distance: 701.7 km (436.0 mi)
- Winning time: 18h 06' 37"

Results
	Winner	Tyler Hamilton (USA)	(Team CSC)
	Second	Laurent Dufaux (SUI)	(Alessio)
	Third	Francisco Pérez (ESP)	(Milaneza–MSS)

The 2003 Tour de Romandie was the 57th edition of the Tour de Romandie cycle race and was held from 29 April to 4 May 2003. The race started in Geneva and finished in Lausanne. The race was won by Tyler Hamilton of the CSC team.

== General classification ==
Final general classification
Rank	Rider	Team	Time
1	Tyler Hamilton (USA)	Team CSC	18h 06' 37"
2	Laurent Dufaux (SUI)	Alessio	+ 33"
3	Francisco Pérez (ESP)	Milaneza–MSS	+ 38"
4	Fabian Jeker (SUI)	Milaneza–MSS	+ 54"
5	Alexandre Moos (SUI)	Phonak	+ 59"
6	Carlos Sastre (ESP)	Team CSC	+ 1' 45"
7	Yaroslav Popovych (UKR)	Landbouwkrediet–Colnago	+ 1' 48"
8	David Moncoutié (FRA)	Cofidis	+ 2' 12"
9	Roberto Laiseka (ESP)	Euskaltel–Euskadi	+ 2' 23"
10	Íñigo Chaurreau (ESP)	AG2R Prévoyance	+ 2' 23"
