= 2002 Tour of the Basque Country =

Race details
- Dates: 8–12 April 2002
- Stages: 5
- Distance: 755.2 km (469.3 mi)
- Winning time: 18h 04' 53"

Results
	Winner	Aitor Osa (ESP)	(iBanesto.com)
	Second	David Etxebarria (ESP)	(Euskaltel–Euskadi)
	Third	Gonzalo Bayarri (ESP)	(Jazztel–Costa de Almería)

The 2002 Tour of the Basque Country was the 42nd edition of the Tour of the Basque Country cycle race and was held from 8 April to 12 April 2002. The race started in Zalla and finished in Elgoibar. The race was won by Aitor Osa of the iBanesto.com team.

== General classification ==
Final general classification

Rank	Rider	Team	Time
1	Aitor Osa (ESP)	Fassa Bortolo	18h 04' 53"
2	David Etxebarria (ESP)	Euskaltel–Euskadi	+ 2' 36"
3	Gonzalo Bayarri (ESP)	Jazztel–Costa de Almería	+ 2' 53"
4	Michael Boogerd (NED)	Rabobank	+ 3' 09"
5	Mario Aerts (BEL)	Lotto–Adecco	+ 3' 54"
6	Cadel Evans (AUS)	Mapei–Quick-Step	+ 3' 55"
7	Alexander Vinokourov (KAZ)	Team Telekom	+ 4' 07"
8	Andrea Noè (ITA)	Mapei–Quick-Step	+ 4' 12"
9	Stefano Garzelli (ITA)	Mapei–Quick-Step	+ 4' 22"
10	Samuel Sánchez (ESP)	Euskaltel–Euskadi	+ 4' 46"
