= 2004 Vuelta a Burgos =

Race details
- Dates: 2–5 August 2004
- Stages: 4
- Distance: 633.8 km (393.8 mi)
- Winning time: 14h 59' 07"

Results
	Winner	Alejandro Valverde (ESP)	(Comunidad Valenciana–Kelme)
	Second	Denis Menchov (RUS)	(Illes Balears–Banesto)
	Third	Leonardo Piepoli (ITA)	(Saunier Duval–Prodir)

The 2004 Vuelta a Burgos was the 26th edition of the Vuelta a Burgos road cycling stage race, which was held from 2 August to 5 August 2004. The race started and finished in Burgos. The race was won by Alejandro Valverde of the Comunidad Valenciana–Kelme team.

== General classification ==
Final general classification

Rank	Rider	Team	Time
1	Alejandro Valverde (ESP)	Comunidad Valenciana–Kelme	14h 59' 07"
2	Denis Menchov (RUS)	Illes Balears–Banesto	+ 3"
3	Leonardo Piepoli (ITA)	Saunier Duval–Prodir	+ 6"
4	Marcos-Antonio Serrano (ESP)	Liberty Seguros	+ 50"
5	Jonathan González Ríos (ESP)	Costa de Almería–Paternina	+ 53"
6	Juan Carlos Domínguez (ESP)	Saunier Duval–Prodir	+ 1' 14"
7	Vladimir Karpets (RUS)	Illes Balears–Banesto	+ 1' 40"
8	Mauricio Ardila (COL)	Chocolade Jacques–Wincor Nixdorf	+ 1' 51"
9	José Alberto Martínez (ESP)	Relax–Bodysol	+ 2' 02"
10	Ondřej Sosenka (CZE)	Acqua & Sapone	+ 2' 06"
