= Kiko García (cyclist) =

Spanish cyclist

Personal information
- Full name: Francisco José García Armendaris
- Born: 25 August 1968 (age 58) Courbevoie, France

Cycling career
- Sport: Cycling
- Current team: Retired
- Discipline: Road
- Role: Rider

Amateur team
- 1992: ONCE (stagiaire)

Professional team
- 1993–1998: ONCE

Kiko García (born 25 August 1968) is a Spanish former cyclist. He competed in the individual road race at the 1992 Summer Olympics, finishing in 24th place.

== Major results ==
1989
1st Overall Clásica de Alcobendas
1992
1st Overall Clásica de Alcobendas
1993
2nd Overall Vuelta a La Rioja

1st Stage 1

1996
2nd Clásica de Sabiñánigo
