= Clásica Internacional de Alcobendas =

Race details
- Date: Early-May
- Region: Community of Madrid, Spain (Alcobendas and surroundings)
- English name: International Alcobendas classic
- Local name(s): Clásica Internacional de Alcobendas (in Spanish)
- Discipline: Road
- Competition: UCI Europe Tour
- Type: Stage-race

History
- First edition: 1984
- Editions: 23
- Final edition: 2008
- First winner: (Netherlands) Alain de Vuyst
- Most wins: (Spain) Kiko García (Spain) Abraham Olano (Spain) Juan Carlos Domínguez (2 wins)
- Final winner: (Spain) Ezequiel Mosquera

The Clásica Internacional de Alcobendas was a three-day professional cycle road race held in Spain in May. The event was first run in 1984 but was not held in 1988 and 1990. From 2005 until its final edition in 2008, the race was organised as a 2.1 event on the UCI Europe Tour.

== Winners ==
Year	Country	Rider	Team
1984	Netherlands	Alain de Vuyst	
1985	Spain	José E. Carrera	
1986	Cuba	Roberto Rodríguez	
1987	Cuba	Jesús Nuñez	
1988	No race		
1989	Spain	Kiko García	
1990	No race		
1991	Spain	Ángel Edo	
1992	Spain	Kiko García	
1993	France	Laurent Jalabert	
1994	Spain	Abraham Olano	
1995	Italy	Federico Colonna	
1996	Italy	Stefano Celambi	
1997	Russia	Serguei Smetanine	
1998	Spain	Juan Carlos Domínguez	
1999	Spain	Juan Carlos Domínguez	
2000	Australia	Henk Vogels	
2001	Spain	Abraham Olano	
2002	France	David Moncoutié	
2003	Spain	Joseba Beloki	
2004	Spain	Iban Mayo	
2005	Russia	Pavel Tonkov	
2006	Czech Republic	Jan Hruška	
2007	Spain	Luis Pérez	
2008	Spain	Ezequiel Mosquera	
