= Subida a Urkiola =

Race details
- Date: Early August
- Region: Basque Country, Spain
- English name: Ascent to Urkiola
- Local name(s): Subida a Urkiola (in Spanish); Urkiola Igoera (in Basque)
- Discipline: Road
- Competition: UCI Europe Tour
- Type: Single-day
- Organiser: Sociedad Ciclista Bilbaina

History
- First edition: 1931
- Editions: 33 (as of 2009)
- First winner: Ricardo Montero (ESP)
- Most wins: Leonardo Piepoli (ITA) (4 wins)
- Most recent: Igor Antón (ESP)

Subida a Urkiola is a one-day cycling race in Durango, Biscay in the Basque Country whose starts in Durango and ends at the Sanctuary of Urkiola. The first edition began in 1931, organized by the Sociedad Ciclista Bilbaina. It has not been held consistently since 1984. Since 2005, the race has been organized as a 1.1 event on the UCI Europe Tour.

== Winners ==
Year	Country	Rider	Team
1931	Spain	Ricardo Montero	
1932- 1935	No race		
1936	Italy	Claudio Leturia	
1936- 1960	No race		
1961	Spain	Antonio Karmany	
1962	Spain	Julio Jiménez	
1963	No race		
1964	Spain	Julio Jiménez	
1965	Spain	Julio Jiménez	
1966	Spain	Eusebio Velez	
1967	No race		
1968	No race		
1969	Spain	Gabriel Mariscal	
1970- 1983	No race		
1984	Spain	Vicente Belda	
1985	Spain	José Rodriguez Magro	
1986	Colombia	Óscar Vargas	
1987	Spain	Marino Lejarreta	
1988	Spain	Marino Lejarreta	
1989	United States	Andrew Hampsten	
1990	United States	Andrew Hampsten	
1991	Spain	Pedro Delgado	
1992	Italy	Claudio Chiappucci	
1993	Switzerland	Tony Rominger	
1994	Spain	José María Jiménez	
1995	Italy	Leonardo Piepoli	
1996	Spain	José María Jiménez	
1997	Switzerland	Beat Zberg	
1998	Italy	Simone Bhorgheresi	
1999	Italy	Leonardo Piepoli	
2000	Italy	Francesco Casagrande	
2001	Spain	Jon Odriozola	
2002	Italy	Dario Frigo	
2003	Italy	Leonardo Piepoli	
2004	Italy	Leonardo Piepoli	
2005	Spain	Joaquim Rodríguez	
2006	Spain	Iban Mayo	
2007	Spain	José Ángel Gómez Marchante	
2008	Spain	David Arroyo	
2009	Spain	Igor Antón	
