= Juan Carlos Domínguez =

Spanish cyclist

Personal information
- Full name: Juan Carlos Domínguez Domínguez
- Born: 13 April 1971 (age 55) Íscar, Spain

Cycling career
- Sport: Cycling
- Discipline: Road
- Role: Rider
- Rider type: Climber; Time trialist

Professional teams
- 1995–1997: Kelme–Sureña
- 1998–2000: Vitalicio Seguros
- 2001: iBanesto.com
- 2002–2003: Phonak
- 2004–2005: Saunier Duval–Prodir
- 2006: Unibet.com

Major wins
- Giro d'Italia, 1 stage

Juan Carlos Domínguez Domínguez (born 13 April 1971 in Íscar, Spain) is a former professional road racing cyclist. He was a professional rider from 1995 to 2006.

In the 2006 Eneco Tour of Benelux he had a hematocrit above 50 before the start of stage 5 and he was suspended for 15 days.

His daughter, Estela, was killed in a collision with a lorry at a lorry at Villares de la Reina in February 2023 at the age of 19, while training for her first year as a professional with the Sopela team.

== Major results ==
1994
1st GP Capodarco
1996
3rd Overall Vuelta a Aragón
7th Time trial, UCI Road World Championships
9th Overall Tour of the Basque Country
9th Subida al Naranco
1997
1st Overall Vuelta a Murcia

1st Mountains classification
1st Stage 5 (ITT)

1st Overall Setmana Catalana de Ciclisme

1st Stage 5b (ITT)

1st Overall Volta a la Comunitat Valenciana
4th Overall Tour of Galicia
5th Overall Vuelta a Aragón
10th Time trial, UCI Road World Championships
1998
1st Overall Clásica de Alcobendas
2nd Overall Vuelta a La Rioja

1st Stage 3

2nd Time trial, National Road Championships
1999
1st Overall Vuelta a Aragón

1st Stage 3

1st Overall Vuelta a La Rioja

1st Stage 3

1st Overall Vuelta a Asturias

1st Points classification

1st Overall Clásica de Alcobendas
5th Overall Setmana Catalana de Ciclisme
9th Overall Tour of the Basque Country
2000
2nd Overall Volta a la Comunitat Valenciana
2nd Overall Critérium International
3rd Overall Tirreno-Adriatico
7th Overall Tour of the Basque Country
2001
1st Overall Vuelta a Asturias

1st Points classification
1st Stage 6b

1st Overall Vuelta a Aragón

1st Stage 3

1st Overall Euskal Bizikleta
4th Overall Vuelta a La Rioja
5th Overall Tour of the Basque Country
5th Overall Critérium International
7th Overall Vuelta a Murcia
7th Circuito de Getxo
2002
1st Prologue Giro d'Italia
1st Stage 2b Setmana Catalana de Ciclisme (ITT)
2003
2nd Overall Tour de Picardie

1st Stage 3b

5th Overall Vuelta a Murcia
6th Overall Vuelta a Aragón
7th Overall Critérium International
2004
1st Overall Vuelta a Andalucía

1st Stage 3

6th Overall Vuelta a Burgos
2005
1st Overall Vuelta a Burgos

1st Stage 4

2006
9th Overall Critérium International

=== Grand Tour general classification results timeline ===
| Grand Tour | 1995 | 1996 | 1997 | 1998 | 1999 | 2000 | 2001 | 2002 | 2003 | 2004 |
|---|---|---|---|---|---|---|---|---|---|---|
| Giro d'Italia | — | DNF | DNF | DNF | — | 45 | — | 75 | — | DNF |
| Tour de France | — | — | — | — | — | — | — | — | — | — |
| Vuelta a España | 65 | 72 | 18 | DNF | — | — | 121 | 93 | DNF | DNF |

Legend
| — | Did not compete |
| DNF | Did not finish |
