= 2006 Tour de Romandie =

Cycling race

2006 UCI ProTour, race 11 of 27

Race details
- Dates: 25 – 30 April 2006
- Stages: 5 + Prologue
- Distance: 656.3 km (407.8 mi)
- Winning time: 16h 43' 08"

Results
	Winner	Cadel Evans (AUS)	(Davitamon–Lotto)
	Second	Alberto Contador (ESP)	(Liberty Seguros–Würth)
	Third	Alejandro Valverde (ESP)	(Caisse d'Epargne–Illes Balears)
	Points	Alejandro Valverde (ESP)	(Caisse d'Epargne–Illes Balears)
	Mountains	Iván Ramiro Parra (COL)	(Cofidis)
	Team	Liberty Seguros–Würth	

French cyclist Rémy Di Gregorio during the Prologue

The 2006 Tour de Romandie was the 60th edition of the Tour de Romandie cycling road race and the 11th event of the 2006 UCI ProTour. It took place from 25 to 30 April in Switzerland. It was won by Australian climber Cadel Evans of the Davitamon–Lotto who surprisingly won the final time trial stage and won the general classification despite starting the time trial in third position overall.

== Stages ==
=== Prologue – April 25: Geneva ITT, 3.4km ===
The stage was a short individual time trial. Pre-Tour favorite, Jan Ullrich, a notable time trialist and Tour de France winner, underperformed, clocking only 4 minutes 53 seconds, almost 30 seconds slower than fastest time of the day.

Prologue results
Rank	Rider	Team	Time
1	Paolo Savoldelli (ITA)	Discovery Channel	4' 27"
2	Alejandro Valverde (ESP)	Caisse d'Epargne–Illes Balears	+ 0"
3	Bradley McGee (AUS)	Française des Jeux	+ 4"
4	Óscar Pereiro (ESP)	Caisse d'Epargne–Illes Balears	+ 7"
5	László Bodrogi (HUN)	Crédit Agricole	+ 7"
6	Tadej Valjavec (SLO)	Lampre–Fondital	+ 8"
7	Haimar Zubeldia (ESP)	Euskaltel–Euskadi	+ 8"
8	Laurent Lefèvre (FRA)	Bouygues Télécom	+ 9"
9	Andreas Dietziker (SUI)	Team LPR	+ 9"
10	Bobby Julich (USA)	Team CSC	+ 9"

General classification after Prologue
Rank	Rider	Team	Time
1	Paolo Savoldelli (ITA)	Discovery Channel	4' 27"
2	Alejandro Valverde (ESP)	Caisse d'Epargne–Illes Balears	+ 0"
3	Bradley McGee (AUS)	Française des Jeux	+ 4"
4	Óscar Pereiro (ESP)	Caisse d'Epargne–Illes Balears	+ 7"
5	László Bodrogi (HUN)	Crédit Agricole	+ 7"
6	Tadej Valjavec (SLO)	Lampre–Fondital	+ 8"
7	Haimar Zubeldia (ESP)	Euskaltel–Euskadi	+ 8"
8	Laurent Lefèvre (FRA)	Bouygues Télécom	+ 9"
9	Andreas Dietziker (SUI)	Team LPR	+ 9"
10	Bobby Julich (USA)	Team CSC	+ 9"

=== Stage 1 – April 26: Payerne–Payerne, 169.0km ===
Stage 1 results
Rank	Rider	Team	Time
1	Robbie McEwen (AUS)	Davitamon–Lotto	4h 10' 21"
2	Mirco Lorenzetto (ITA)	Team Milram	+ 0"
3	Daniele Bennati (ITA)	Lampre–Fondital	+ 0"
4	Enrico Gasparotto (ITA)	Liquigas	+ 0"
5	Bram de Groot (NED)	Rabobank	+ 0"
6	Alberto Ongarato (ITA)	Team Milram	+ 0"
7	Pedro Horrillo (ESP)	Rabobank	+ 0"
8	Arnaud Gérard (FRA)	Française des Jeux	+ 0"
9	Leonardo Fabio Duque (COL)	Cofidis	+ 0"
10	Fabrizio Guidi (ITA)	Phonak	+ 0"

General classification after Stage 1
Rank	Rider	Team	Time
1	Paolo Savoldelli (ITA)	Discovery Channel	4h 14' 48"
2	Alejandro Valverde (ESP)	Caisse d'Epargne–Illes Balears	+ 0"
3	Bradley McGee (AUS)	Française des Jeux	+ 2"
4	Robbie McEwen (AUS)	Davitamon–Lotto	+ 2"
5	László Bodrogi (HUN)	Crédit Agricole	+ 6"
6	Daniele Bennati (ITA)	Lampre–Fondital	+ 7"
7	Óscar Pereiro (ESP)	Caisse d'Epargne–Illes Balears	+ 7"
8	Tadej Valjavec (SLO)	Lampre–Fondital	+ 9"
9	Haimar Zubeldia (ESP)	Euskaltel–Euskadi	+ 9"
10	Bram de Groot (NED)	Rabobank	+ 9"

=== Stage 2 – April 27: Porrentruy–Porrentruy, 171.2km ===
Following an early breakaway by Swiss cyclists Roger Beuchat and David Loosli, which lasted for the majority of the stage, they were finally caught at the final climb of the day (less than 20 km from the finish), the 1st Category Col de la Croix; which is particularly steep at some points. On the climb itself a 15-man group which was led by Spaniard Joaquim Rodríguez was quickly formed, including provisional leader Paolo Savoldelli, but excluding General Classement favorites Bradley McGee and Óscar Pereiro.

Following the climb, the descent led by specialist Savoldelli stretched the lead group out even further, and the leaders' group was split into two groups. With 5 km to go the second of the two groups were looking to approach the lead, and Davitamon–Lotto's Christopher Horner used this as a springboard for his own attack, and managed to stay ahead of the chase group to take the stage.

Stage 2 results
Rank	Rider	Team	Time
1	Chris Horner (USA)	Davitamon–Lotto	4h 16' 22"
2	Jörg Jaksche (GER)	Liberty Seguros–Würth	+ 5"
3	Alexandre Moos (SUI)	Phonak	+ 5"
4	Alejandro Valverde (ESP)	Caisse d'Epargne–Illes Balears	+ 8"
5	Paolo Savoldelli (ITA)	Discovery Channel	+ 8"
6	Cadel Evans (AUS)	Davitamon–Lotto	+ 8"
7	Andrey Kashechkin (KAZ)	Liberty Seguros–Würth	+ 8"
8	Miguel Ángel Martín Perdiguero (ESP)	Phonak	+ 8"
9	Alberto Contador (ESP)	Liberty Seguros–Würth	+ 8"
10	Dario Cioni (ITA)	Liquigas	+ 8"

General classification after Stage 2
Rank	Rider	Team	Time
1	Chris Horner (USA)	Davitamon–Lotto	8h 31' 11"
2	Paolo Savoldelli (ITA)	Discovery Channel	+ 7"
3	Alejandro Valverde (ESP)	Caisse d'Epargne–Illes Balears	+ 7"
4	Alexandre Moos (SUI)	Phonak	+ 9"
5	Jörg Jaksche (GER)	Liberty Seguros–Würth	+ 11"
6	Dario Cioni (ITA)	Liquigas	+ 17"
7	Cadel Evans (AUS)	Davitamon–Lotto	+ 17"
8	Alberto Contador (ESP)	Liberty Seguros–Würth	+ 19"
9	Miguel Ángel Martín Perdiguero (ESP)	Phonak	+ 26"
10	Andrey Kashechkin (KAZ)	Liberty Seguros–Würth	+ 30"

=== Stage 3 – April 28: Bienne–Leysin, 164.6km ===
Stage Three featured a relatively flat stage profile until the final 15 km, where the course shifted to a 1st Category climb up to the Swiss mountain resort of Leysin. A breakaway from the peloton after 25 km, led by Wouter Weylandt of the Quick-Step–Innergetic team, and joined by José Antonio Redondo of the Liberty Seguros team gained a quick lead, which expanded to a maximum of 9 minutes 20 minutes at around the 100 km mark.

The lead was reduced by the peloton to about three minutes at the start of the final climb of the day. On the climb, Redondo quickly shook off Weylandt, and started up the climb by himself. Several early attacks from out of the peloton were pulled back, but the first which succeeded was by Spanish T-Mobile Team climber Óscar Sevilla who quickly opened a lead of several hundred meters. He was shortly followed by Liquigas's Dario Cioni, and as the climb entered its steepest final stage, the solo leader Redondo was caught and passed.

A drive from the GC leaders in the group chasing Sevilla and Cioni eventually led to the two being pulled in with several kilometres left to go, and as the climb approached the summit, 23-year-old Spanish all-rounder Alberto Contador launched an attack up the hill that quickly gained a lead of 20 seconds, which was held until the summit and the finish.

A notable underperformance of the stage was Discovery Channel's Paolo Savoldelli, 2nd in the GC that day, who suffered from diarrhoea and had to stop several times during the stage, and eventually lost 12 minutes on the leaders. Also, Overall Leader Christopher Horner and local favorite Alexandre Moos were not able to keep up with the blistering pace on the final climb and both lost over a minute to stage winner Contador.

Stage 3 results
Rank	Rider	Team	Time
1	Alberto Contador (ESP)	Liberty Seguros–Würth	4h 03' 41"
2	Alejandro Valverde (ESP)	Caisse d'Epargne–Illes Balears	+ 24"
3	Cadel Evans (AUS)	Davitamon–Lotto	+ 24"
4	Jörg Jaksche (GER)	Liberty Seguros–Würth	+ 26"
5	Sergio Ghisalberti (ITA)	Team Milram	+ 30"
6	Miguel Ángel Martín Perdiguero (ESP)	Phonak	+ 32"
7	Andrea Noè (ITA)	Liquigas	+ 32"
8	Óscar Sevilla (ESP)	T-Mobile Team	+ 32"
9	Andrey Kashechkin (KAZ)	Liberty Seguros–Würth	+ 32"
10	Sylwester Szmyd (POL)	Lampre–Fondital	+ 42"

General classification after Stage 3
Rank	Rider	Team	Time
1	Alberto Contador (ESP)	Liberty Seguros–Würth	12h 35' 01"
2	Alejandro Valverde (ESP)	Caisse d'Epargne–Illes Balears	+ 16"
3	Jörg Jaksche (GER)	Liberty Seguros–Würth	+ 28"
4	Cadel Evans (AUS)	Davitamon–Lotto	+ 28"
5	Miguel Ángel Martín Perdiguero (ESP)	Phonak	+ 49"
6	Andrey Kashechkin (KAZ)	Liberty Seguros–Würth	+ 53"
7	Sergio Ghisalberti (ITA)	Team Milram	+ 54"
8	Andrea Noè (ITA)	Liquigas	+ 57"
9	Chris Horner (USA)	Davitamon–Lotto	+ 57"
10	Sylwester Szmyd (POL)	Lampre–Fondital	+ 1' 07"

=== Stage 4 – April 29: Sion–Sion, 127.7km ===
Stage 4 results
Rank	Rider	Team	Time
1	Alejandro Valverde (ESP)	Caisse d'Epargne–Illes Balears	3h 41' 24"
2	Alexandre Moos (SUI)	Phonak	+ 0"
3	Cadel Evans (AUS)	Davitamon–Lotto	+ 0"
4	Jörg Jaksche (GER)	Liberty Seguros–Würth	+ 0"
5	Sylwester Szmyd (POL)	Lampre–Fondital	+ 0"
6	Óscar Sevilla (ESP)	T-Mobile Team	+ 0"
7	Alberto Contador (ESP)	Liberty Seguros–Würth	+ 0"
8	Christophe Moreau (FRA)	AG2R Prévoyance	+ 0"
9	Andrea Noè (ITA)	Liquigas	+ 0"
10	Sergio Ghisalberti (ITA)	Team Milram	+ 0"

General classification after Stage 4
Rank	Rider	Team	Time
1	Alberto Contador (ESP)	Liberty Seguros–Würth	16h 16' 25"
2	Alejandro Valverde (ESP)	Caisse d'Epargne–Illes Balears	+ 6"
3	Cadel Evans (AUS)	Davitamon–Lotto	+ 24"
4	Jörg Jaksche (GER)	Liberty Seguros–Würth	+ 28"
5	Sergio Ghisalberti (ITA)	Team Milram	+ 54"
6	Andrea Noè (ITA)	Liquigas	+ 57"
7	Andrey Kashechkin (KAZ)	Liberty Seguros–Würth	+ 1' 04"
8	Sylwester Szmyd (POL)	Lampre–Fondital	+ 1' 07"
9	Alexandre Moos (SUI)	Phonak	+ 1' 11"
10	Chris Horner (USA)	Davitamon–Lotto	+ 1' 14"

=== Stage 5 – April 30: Lausanne ITT, 20.4km ===
The stage was an individual time trial. Cadel Evans rode superbly in the last few kilometers, taking the provisional lead, and when General Classement leader Alberto Contador and close GC number 2 Alejandro Valverde both lost more than 50 seconds to Evans, the Australian all-rounder rode to overall victory.

Stage 5 results
Rank	Rider	Team	Time
1	Cadel Evans (AUS)	Davitamon–Lotto	26' 19"
2	Leif Hoste (GER)	Discovery Channel	+ 22"
3	Bobby Julich (USA)	Team CSC	+ 38"
4	Andrey Kashechkin (KAZ)	Liberty Seguros–Würth	+ 44"
5	Serhiy Honchar (UKR)	T-Mobile Team	+ 49"
6	Jörg Jaksche (GER)	Liberty Seguros–Würth	+ 50"
7	Alberto Contador (ESP)	Liberty Seguros–Würth	+ 51"
8	Christophe Moreau (FRA)	AG2R Prévoyance	+ 51"
9	Jurgen Van den Broeck (BEL)	Discovery Channel	+ 53"
10	Dario Cioni (ITA)	Liquigas	+ 53"

General classification after Stage 5
Rank	Rider	Team	Time
1	Cadel Evans (AUS)	Davitamon–Lotto	16h 43' 08"
2	Alberto Contador (ESP)	Liberty Seguros–Würth	+ 27"
3	Alejandro Valverde (ESP)	Caisse d'Epargne–Illes Balears	+ 44"
4	Jörg Jaksche (GER)	Liberty Seguros–Würth	+ 54"
5	Andrey Kashechkin (KAZ)	Liberty Seguros–Würth	+ 1' 24"
6	Dario Cioni (ITA)	Liquigas	+ 1' 46"
7	Chris Horner (USA)	Davitamon–Lotto	+ 1' 50"
8	Alexandre Moos (SUI)	Phonak	+ 1' 51"
9	Sergio Ghisalberti (ITA)	Team Milram	+ 1' 55"
10	Sylwester Szmyd (POL)	Lampre–Fondital	+ 2' 21"
