= 2004 Tour de Romandie =

Race details
- Dates: 27 April–2 May 2004
- Stages: 5 + Prologue
- Distance: 628.6 km (390.6 mi)
- Winning time: 15h 45' 44'

Results
	Winner	Tyler Hamilton (USA)	(Phonak)
	Second	Fabian Jeker (SUI)	(Saunier Duval–Prodir)
	Third	Leonardo Piepoli (ITA)	(Saunier Duval–Prodir)
	Points	Tyler Hamilton (USA)	(Phonak)
	Mountains	Sven Montgomery (SUI)	(Gerolsteiner)
	Sprints	Bradley McGee (AUS)	(FDJeux.com)
	Team	Phonak	

The 2004 Tour de Romandie was the 58th Edition of the Tour de Romandie cycling road race. It was held from 27 April to 2 May in Switzerland. It was won by Tyler Hamilton.

== Classification Leadership ==
Stage	Winner	General Classification	King of the Mountains	Points Classification	Sprints Classification	Team Classification
P	Bradley McGee	Bradley McGee	not awarded	Bradley McGee	not awarded	Phonak
1	Ján Svorada	Bradley McGee	Alexandre Moos	Ján Svorada	Bradley McGee	Phonak
2	Stefano Garzelli	Bradley McGee	Manuel Calvente	Bradley McGee	Bradley McGee	Phonak
3	Alexandre Moos	Alexandre Moos	Oscar Camenzind	Bradley McGee	Bradley McGee	Phonak
4	Fabian Jeker	Tyler Hamilton	Sven Montgomery	Alexandre Moos	Bradley McGee	Phonak
5	Tyler Hamilton	Tyler Hamilton	Sven Montgomery	Tyler Hamilton	Bradley McGee	Phonak
Final		Tyler Hamilton	Sven Montgomery	Tyler Hamilton	Bradley McGee	Phonak

== General classification ==
Final general classification
Rank	Rider	Team	Time
1	Tyler Hamilton (USA)	Phonak	15h 45' 44"
2	Fabian Jeker (SUI)	Saunier Duval–Prodir	+ 1' 43"
3	Leonardo Piepoli (ITA)	Saunier Duval–Prodir	+ 2' 18"
4	Tadej Valjavec (SLO)	Phonak	+ 2' 19"
5	Dario David Cioni (ITA)	Fassa Bortolo	+ 2' 33"
6	Alexandre Moos (SUI)	Phonak	+ 2' 39"
7	Ivan Basso (ITA)	Team CSC	+ 3' 31"
8	Francisco Mancebo (ESP)	Illes Balears–Banesto	+ 4' 32"
9	Bradley McGee (AUS)	FDJeux.com	+ 5' 08"
10	Steve Zampieri (SUI)	Vini Caldirola–Nobili Rubinetterie	+ 5' 53"

== See also ==
- 2004 in road cycling
- UCI Pro Tour
