= Hear the World Foundation =

- Abbreviation: HtW
- Established: 2006
- Type: Nonprofit organization
- Purpose: Corporate Social Responsibility: Children; Hearing Impairment
- Headquarters: Zug, Switzerland
- Region served: Worldwide
- Methods: Technology; Funding; Expertise
- Board of directors: Arnd Kaldowski President
- Website: hear-the-world.com

The Hear the World Foundation is a corporate nonprofit foundation founded by Sonova working towards equal opportunities and better quality of life for people with hearing loss. The Foundation operates as grant-giver supporting project-partnerships in four specific areas:

- Children affected by hearing loss; providing audiological care for children in low- and middle income countries.
- Programs for parents and families; supporting self-help groups for parents and families of children with hearing loss especially focused on help and assistance.
- Prevention of hearing loss; promoting awareness campaigns and field work, locally and globally to sensitize children and adults on topic of hearing care and hearing loss.
- Professional training; Supporting capacity building projects enabling continuous audiological training for local professionals.

The Foundation has since its establishment in 2006 been involved in over 80 projects among those are "Hear Malawi", "Hear Peru", "Hear South Africa", and a long-term partnership with the Centro Cristiano de Servicios Medicos in the Dominican Republic.

== History ==
In 2006 the Swiss Hearing Aid manufacturer Phonak AG founded the nonprofit organization Hear the World Foundation as a mean to raise public awareness of conscious hearing practices and to help support children in need affected by hearing loss. From 2007 until 2012 the foundation published the "Hear the World Magazine" to create awareness for the topics of hearing and hearing loss. The magazine was published in German and English and distributed to the broader public until 2012.

In October 2012 Hear the World expanded its activities and became a CSR Initiative of the group concern Sonova.

In 2013 the foundation started to engage employees of Sonova as volunteers for its projects. Also in 2013, the foundation became a member of Swissfoundations.

In 2014, Hear the World started a prevention campaign. In collaboration with the concert agencies, HTW earplugs were handed out at concerts in Switzerland. Another milestone marked the year 2016 with the first donation of a cochlear implant in Panama. In 2017, over CHF 400’000 were raised at the first Hear the World Charity Gala.

== Current projects ==
Hear Malawi (since 2011) The Hear the World Foundation supports since 2011 the collaboration of the Australian organization EARS Inc and the African Bible College Malawi. The support includes financial support, donation of hearing aids and batteries as well as provision of professional expertise by volunteering Sonova employees. In Malawi Hear the World Foundation has helped to establish the first ever hearing clinic in the country. The ABC Hearing Clinic and Training Centre in Lilongwe was officially opened by Malawi's Minister of Health on 4 October 2013. The clinic's team also regularly travels across the whole country with an audio trailer – a bus with all the necessary equipment to conduct hearing screening, provided by HTW. They visit schools, clinics, and even refugee camps, treating those patients who cannot get to the clinic in the capital city of Lilongwe and would not have access to audiological care were it not for these visits. Another milestone was reached in August 2017, when hearing tests on newborn babies were conducted for the first time in a maternity clinic in Lilongwe.

Centro Cristiano de Servicios Médicos - Dominican Republic (since 2010) - The partnership with the Centro Cristiano de Servicios Médicos in the Dominican Republic has since 2010 supported local access to high-level audiological care. The support from the Hear the World Foundation includes funding of professional audiological diagnostic equipment, financial donations and professional expertise. In 2015, the project expanded to include the establishment of a newborn hearing screening program.

Hear Peru (since 2016) - In Peru, the World Wide Hearing Foundation (WWH) and the Hear the World Foundation are launching a hearing screening campaign – to work towards the prevention of hearing loss and to support early identification of school children with hearing loss. Hear the World Foundation provides financial support to the project through a three year grant and also through the provision of professional expertise. As a first step, WWH will train technicians and speech therapy students to conduct hearing screenings. Furthermore, teachers at selected schools will also be trained to identify potential warning signs of hearing loss amongst their students. As a second step, the trained technicians and speech therapy students will train teachers from additional schools in Lima. All together they will screen roughly 30,000 students, aged 5 to 18, within two years. To lower the cost of screenings, the project works with volunteers and teachers already employed by their partner schools.

Hear South Africa (since 2017) - The Hear the World Foundation is supporting the start-up hearX Group, which developed an app for non-professionals to conduct hearing screenings. The aim is to screen the hearing of 10,000 children by 2019. Furthermore Hear the World is donating hearing aids for 88 children in need diagnosed with hearing loss.

Fundación Pro Integración (FUNPROI) - Panama (since 2013) The project-partnership between the Hear the World Foundation and FUNPROI in Panama was established in 2013. The project is aiming at providing affordable audiological care for Panamanian children and young people. The support of Hear the World include financial support, donations of digital hearing aids and batteries as well as provision of audiological expertise by volunteering Sonova Employees. In 2016 the Hear the World Foundation is donating cochlear implants for the first time. In 2016 three children from Panama received a cochlear implant and four more children in 2017. The donation builds on the previous project support and now allows to have a solution also for children with profound hearing loss.

Hear Armenia (since 2010) The project funded by Hear the World Foundation supports the long-term partnership between the Arabkir Hospital in the Armenian capital Yerevan and the University Children’s Hospital in Zurich. The project support from the Hear the World Foundation enables Swiss audiological experts to travel to Armenia to provide audiological care and hearing aids to children with hearing loss. The project places a special emphasis on integrating children with hearing loss into the mainstream school system.

Hear Haiti (since 2012) The project partnership between the Hear the World Foundation and the Commissioned Believers Deaf Ministry in Leveque, Haiti was established in 2012. The project aims at creating a sustainable hearing health care program for the Community of Leveque and encompasses all methodological support dimensions deployed by Hear the World: Donations of digital hearing aids and batteries, financial support and professional expertise to capacity build local audiological expertise by volunteering Sonova employees.

The Judith Gravel Fellowship (since 2010) - The Fellowship was created in collaboration with the Department of Otolaryngology at the University of North Carolina, USA in memory of the audiologist Dr. Judith Gravel, who died in 2008. Ever since 2010, the fellowship been presented annually to an outstanding audiology student of the UNC Chapel Hill to strengthen educational focus on audiological management of infants and young children with hearing loss.

Red Bird Appalachia (since 2008) - The project-partnership between the Hear the World Foundation and the Red Bird Mission and Clinic located in Beverly, Kentucky, USA took its beginning in 2008. Since then, the aim of the collaboration has been to provide high standard audiological health care to the local population of Red Bird. The project support from Hear The World Foundation includes donation of hearing aids and batteries, financial support and since 2013, also professional expertise provided pro-bono by volunteering Sonova Employees.

Hear Cambodia (since 2010) - The partnership between All Ears Cambodia and the Hear the World Foundation has since its establishment in 2010 aimed at creating and maintaining a sustainable audiological health care program for the population of Cambodia. The support from the Hear the World Foundation includes financial support, donations of digital hearing aids and batteries as well as the provision of audiological expertise by volunteering Sonova Employees.

== Funding, structure and finances ==
Funding

The Sonova Group gives an annual donation to the Hear the World Foundation and bares all add-on expenses for its staff as well as administrative support in administration, communications, finance, legal and export handling. The foundation does not have any fixed assets. Its assets comprises the foundation's capital, derived from a yearly amount donated by Sonova as well as donations by single individuals.

Organizational structure

The foundation board and the secretariat are comprised by people from the Sonova Group. The foundation’s independence is assured by the Advisory Board, comprised by external experts from the audiological field. These are responsible for the evaluation of suitable projects, proposed to the Foundation Board for the allocation of foundation funds. The Advisory Board also advises the Foundation Board in deciding on the amount of the donations to be allocated. The Advisory Board members are all working honorary.

The secretariat is responsible for the foundation’s communications and supports the Foundation and Advisory Boards in the administrative and organizational management of the foundation. Alongside these duties, the secretariat maintains contact with stakeholders and partners.

Finances

In the financial year 2017/2018 the total value of cash and in-kind benefits provided by the Sonova Group to Hear the World Foundation was CHF 3.51 million. The Hear the World Foundation supported 25 projects in 26 countries, donating more than 1'660 hearing aids, which were personally fitted.

== Ambassadors ==
Hear the World Foundation has of November 2018 over 100 Ambassadors worldwide. All ambassadors are captured by musician and photographer Bryan Adams in the iconic Hear the World pose - with one hand behind the ear - pledging to raise awareness of conscious hearing. These are celebrities mainly from the music and film industry contributing to raise public awareness for the importance of good hearing as well as the consequences of hearing loss. From 2008-2018, a calendar featuring selected Hear the World ambassadors posing for conscious hearing has been sold donating all proceeding to support projects of the foundation . The list of Hear the World Ambassadors counts celebrities such as: Bruce Springsteen, Cindy Crawford, John Legend, Jared Leto, Priyanka Chopra, Daniel Brühl, Gregor Meyle, Marc Sway, Joss Stone, Eros Ramazzotti, Lea Seydoux, Theo Hutchcraft, Tina Turner, Freida Pinto, Kate Moss, Sting, Diana Krall and Gilberto Gil. In 2012, Hear the World even won the Guinness world record for the largest ambassador campaign.

== Employee engagement ==
The Sonova Group has since 2013 engaged employees as volunteers for Hear the World projects. The volunteers are experts in field of interest for concrete projects, selected by Hear the World Foundation. In 2017/18, 1860 Sonova employees committed 1’056 days of volunteering to Hear the World – they supported aid projects with their expertise and spread the word about the foundation. Also, the Sonova employees raised over CHF 18’000 for the Hear the World Foundation in 2017.

== Partners ==
- Audioscan
- Otometrics
- VARTA Microbattery
- Vibes

== See also ==
- Hearing impairment
- Corporate Social Responsibility
- Audiometry
- Noise-induced hearing loss
- Hearing Aid
- Audiology
- Exposure Action Value
