= Urweider =

Urweider is a surname. Notable people with the surname include:

- Raphael Urweider (born 1974), Swiss writer and musician
- Sascha Urweider (born 1980), Swiss cyclist
