= Piserchia =

Piserchia is a surname. Notable people with the surname include:

- Doris Piserchia, American science fiction writer
- Erminio Piserchia (born 1964), Italian-Swiss football manager
