= Erminio Piserchia =

Italian-Swiss footballer and manager (born 1964)

Personal information
- Date of birth: 12 January 1964 (age 62)
- Position: Defender

Senior career*
Years	Team	Apps	(Gls)
1981–1983	FC Concordia Basel		
1983–1985	Grasshoppers	19	(3)
1985–1986	FC Laufen		
1986–1989	St. Gallen	87	(17)
1989–1992	Lugano	39	(1)

Managerial career
- 2006: Young Boys (caretaker manager)
- 2006–2008: Young Boys (assistant)
- 2008: Young Boys (caretaker)
- 2008–2011: Young Boys (assistant)
- 2011: Young Boys (caretaker)
- 2012: Young Boys (caretaker)
- 2011–2014: Young Boys (academy)
- 2014-2017: Young Boys U18
- 2017–2020: Young Boys U16
- 2021–2023: Grasshopper (assistant)
- 2023: Grasshopper (Academy director)
- * Club domestic league appearances and goals

Erminio Piserchia (born 12 January 1964) is an Italian-Swiss football manager and former player who played as a defender. He is known as a long time member of BSC Young Boys coaching staff, including stints as caretaker manager.

In June 2021, he joined Grasshopper Club Zürich as assistant coach to Giorgio Contini. On 4 January 2023, he became the technical director for the youth academy of GC. He departed the position on 5 October 2023 due to restructuring of the GC academy.
