= Aleksander Mandziara =

Polish footballer and coach

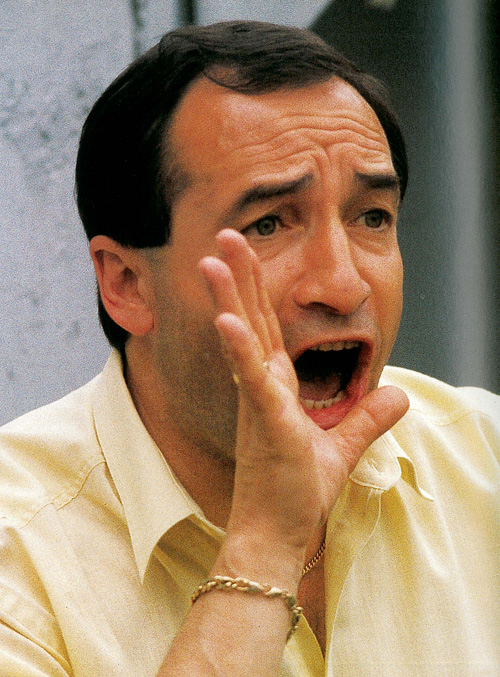

Personal information
- Birth name: Alfons Mandziara
- Date of birth: 16 August 1940
- Place of birth: Gliwice, Poland
- Date of death: 2 September 2015 (aged 75)
- Position: Defender

Senior career*
Years	Team	Apps	(Gls)
- ŁTS Łabędy
- Flota Gdynia
1963–1971	Szombierki Bytom		
1971–1972	NAC Breda		
- GKS Tychy

Managerial career
- 1975–1977: GKS Tychy
- 1977–1978: Pogoń Szczecin
- 1981–1983: Rot-Weiss Essen
- 1984–1988: Young Boys
- 1988–1989: FC Biel/Bienne
- 1989–1990: LASK Linz
- 1990–1992: FC Stahl Linz
- 1992–1993: Darmstadt 98
- 1996–1998: FC Bern
- * Club domestic league appearances and goals

Aleksander Mandziara (born Alfons Mandziara; 16 August 1940 – 2 September 2015) was a Polish football manager and player.

== Playing career ==
Mandziara played for ŁTS Łabędy, Flota Gdynia, Szombierki Bytom, NAC Breda and GKS Tychy.

== Coaching career ==
Mandziara managed GKS Tychy, Pogoń Szczecin, Rot-Weiss Essen, BSC Young Boys, FC Biel/Bienne, LASK Linz, FC Stahl Linz, SV Darmstadt 98 and FC Bern.

== Honours ==
Young Boys

- Swiss League: 1985–86
- Swiss Cup: 1986–87
- Swiss Super Cup: 1986
