= Walter Eich =

Swiss footballer (1925-2018)

Personal information
- Date of birth: 27 May 1925
- Place of birth: Switzerland
- Date of death: 1 June 2018 (aged 93)
- Place of death: Bern, Switzerland
- Position: Goalkeeper

Senior career*
Years	Team	Apps	(Gls)
1945–1947	FC Winterthur		
1947–1960	BSC Young Boys		

International career
1951–1954	Switzerland	5	(0)

Managerial career
- 1970–1972: BSC Young Boys
- 1983–1984: BSC Young Boys
- * Club domestic league appearances and goals

Walter Eich (27 May 1925 – 1 June 2018) was a Swiss football goalkeeper who played for Switzerland in the 1954 FIFA World Cup. He also played for FC Winterthur and BSC Young Boys. He died on 1 June 2018, aged 93 in Bern.

== Honours ==
BSC Young Boys

- Swiss Super League: 1956–57, 1957–58, 1958–59, 1959–60
- Swiss Cup: 1952–53, 1957–58
