= 2004 in women's road cycling =

== World Championships ==
Race	Date	Winner	Second	Third
Elite events
World Championship Road Race	October	Judith Arndt (GER)	Tatiana Guderzo (ITA)	Anita Valen (NOR)
World Championship Time Trial	September	Karin Thürig (SUI)	Judith Arndt (GER)	Zulfiya Zabirova (RUS)
Junior events
World Championship Road Race	October 1	Marianne Vos (NED)	Marta Bastianelli (ITA)	Ellen van Dijk (NED)
World Championship Time Trial	September	Tereza Huříková (CZE)	Rebecca Much (USA)	Amanda Spratt (AUS)

== Olympic Games ==
Race	Date	Winner	Second	Third
(International Olympic Committee) Olympic Games Road Race	August 15	Sara Carrigan (AUS)	Judith Arndt (GER)	Olga Slyusareva (RUS)
(International Olympic Committee) Olympic Games Time Trial	August 18	Leontien van Moorsel (NED)	Deirdre Demet-Barry (USA)	Karin Thürig (SUI)

== UCI World Cup ==
Date	Event	Country	Winner
29 February	Australia World Cup, Geelong	Australia	Oenone Wood (AUS)
20 March	Primavera Rosa	Italy	Zulfiya Zabirova (RUS)
28 March	GP Castilla y León	Spain	Angela Brodtka (GER)
4 April	Tour of Flanders for Women	Belgium	Zulfiya Zabirova (RUS)
21 April	La Flèche Wallonne Féminine	Belgium	Sonia Huguet (FRA)
29 May	Coupe du Monde Cycliste Féminine de Montréal	Canada	Geneviève Jeanson (CAN)
29 August	GP de Plouay	France	Edita Pučinskaitė (LIT)
5 September	Lowland International Rotterdam Tour	Netherlands	Petra Rossner (GER)
11 September	Rund um die Nürnberger Altstadt	Germany	Petra Rossner (GER)

== Single day races (1.9.1 and 1.9.2) ==
Race	Date	Cat.
(Italy) Citta di Rosignano / Giro Frazioni	March 14	1.9.2
(Italy) Trofeo Riviera Della Versilia	April 3	1.9.2
(Italy) GP Liberazione	April 25	1.9.2
(Switzerland) Berner-Rundfahrt / Tour de Berne	April 25	1.9.1
(Switzerland) Souvenir Magali Pache Lausanne	May 2	1.9.1
(Sweden) Tjejtrampet	May 23	1.9.2
(United States) Wachovia Liberty Classic	June 6	1.9.1
(Spain) Durango-Durango Emakumen Sarria	June 8	1.9.2
(France) Atlantique Manche Féminine	July 4	1.9.2
(Italy) GP Carnevale d'Europa	July 17	1.9.2
GP San Marino	July 18	1.9.2
(Germany) Sparkassen Giro	August 8	1.9.2
(United States) T Mobile International	September 12	1.9.1
(France) Chrono Champenois – Trophée Européen	September 12	1.9.2
(France) Grand Prix des Nations	September 19	1.9.1
(France) Chrono des Herbiers	October 17	1.9.2

== Stage races (2.9.1 and 2.9.2) ==
Race	Date	Cat.
(Australia) Geelong Tour	February 22–25	2.9.2
(United States) Redlands Bicycle Classic	March 24–28	2.9.2
(Spain) Vuelta a Castilla y León	March 24–26	2.9.1
(Netherlands) Novilon Internationale Damesronde van Drenthe	April 9–11	2.9.1
(United States) Sea Otter Classic	April 14–17	2.9.2
(Czech Republic) Gracia–Orlová	April 29 – May 2	2.9.2
(France) Tour de l'Aude Cycliste Féminin	May 13–23	2.9.1
(Canada) Tour du Grand Montréal	May 31 – June 2	2.9.1
(Poland) Eko Tour Dookola Polski	June 5–8	2.9.2
(Spain) Emakumeen Bira	June 10–13	2.9.1
(Italy) Giro del Trentino Alto Adige-Südtirol	June 17–20	2.9.1
(Italy) Giro d'Italia Femminile	July 2–11	2.9.1
(Czech Republic) Tour de Feminin – Krásná Lípa	July 9–12	2.9.2
(France) Tour Féminin de Bretagne	July 14–18	2.9.2
(Germany) Thüringen Rundfahrt der Frauen	July 20–25	2.9.1
(France) Trophée d'Or Féminin	August 21–25	2.9.2
(Netherlands) Holland Ladies Tour	August 30 – September 4	2.9.1
(Italy) Giro della Toscana Int. Femminile – Memorial Michela Fanini	September 14–19	2.9.1

== Continental Championships ==
=== Asian Championships ===
Race	Date	Winner	Second	Third
Individual time trial	April	Li Meifang (CHN)	Miyoko Karami (JPN)	Zhang Junying (CHN)
Road race	April	Zhang Junying (CHN)	Chanpeng Nontasin (THA)	Akemi Morimoto (JPN)

=== European Championships (under-23) ===
Race	Date	Winner	Second	Third
Time trial (under-23)	July 3	Tatiana Guderzo (ITA)	Madeleine Sandig (GER)	Anna Zugno (ITA)
Road race (under-23).	July 5	Monica Holler (SWE)	Bertine Spijkerman (NED)	Nathalie Tirard Collet (FRA)

== See also ==
- 2004 in men's road cycling

Template:2004 road cycling season by team
