= 2005 Tour de Romandie =

2005 UCI ProTour, race 11 of 28

Race details
- Dates: 26 April–1 May 2005
- Stages: 5 + Prologue
- Distance: 659.3 km (409.7 mi)
- Winning time: 15h 58' 02"

Results
	Winner	Santiago Botero (COL)	(Phonak)
	Second	Damiano Cunego (ITA)	(Lampre–Caffita)
	Third	Denis Menchov	(Rabobank)
	Points	Stefano Garzelli (ITA)	(Liquigas–Bianchi)
	Mountains	Rubén Lobato (ESP)	(Saunier Duval–Prodir)
	Team	Phonak	

The 2005 Tour de Romandie was the 59th edition of the Tour de Romandie cycling road race and the 11th event of the 2005 UCI ProTour. It was held from 26 April to 1 May in Switzerland. It was won by Santiago Botero.

== Stages ==
=== 26-04-2005: Genève, 3.4 km. (ITT) ===
Prologue results
Rank	Rider	Team	Time
1	Óscar Pereiro (ESP)	Phonak	4' 28"
2	Paolo Savoldelli (ITA)	Discovery Channel	+ 0"
3	Stefano Garzelli (ITA)	Liquigas–Bianchi	+ 3"
4	Bradley McGee (AUS)	Française des Jeux	+ 3"
5	Erik Dekker (NED)	Rabobank	+ 3"
6	Fränk Schleck (LUX)	Team CSC	+ 4"
7	Alexandre Moos (SUI)	Phonak	+ 4"
8	Sébastien Rosseler (BEL)	Quick-Step–Innergetic	+ 5"
9	Luis Pérez Rodríguez (ESP)	Cofidis	+ 6"
10	Ryder Hesjedal (CAN)	Discovery Channel	+ 6"

=== 27-04-2005: Avenches, 166.9 km. ===
Stage 1 results
Rank	Rider	Team	Time
1	Alessandro Petacchi (ITA)	Fassa Bortolo	3h 42' 55"
2	Tom Steels (BEL)	Davitamon–Lotto	+ 0"
3	André Korff (GER)	T-Mobile Team	+ 0"
4	Stefano Garzelli (ITA)	Liquigas–Bianchi	+ 0"
5	José Iván Gutiérrez (ESP)	Illes Balears–Caisse d'Epargne	+ 0"
6	Óscar Pereiro (ESP)	Phonak	+ 0"
7	Luke Roberts (AUS)	Team CSC	+ 0"
8	Josu Silloniz (ESP)	Euskaltel–Euskadi	+ 0"
9	Robert Förster (GER)	Gerolsteiner	+ 0"
10	Paolo Savoldelli (ITA)	Discovery Channel	+ 0"

=== 28-04-2005: Fleurier, 171.9 km. ===
Stage 2 results
Rank	Rider	Team	Time
1	Alessandro Petacchi (ITA)	Fassa Bortolo	4h 17' 13"
2	Daniele Colli (ITA)	Liquigas–Bianchi	+ 0"
3	Mirco Lorenzetto (ITA)	Domina Vacanze	+ 0"
4	Giovanni Lombardi (ITA)	Team CSC	+ 0"
5	Josu Silloniz (ESP)	Euskaltel–Euskadi	+ 0"
6	Julian Dean (NZL)	Crédit Agricole	+ 0"
7	André Korff (GER)	T-Mobile Team	+ 0"
8	David Loosli (SUI)	Lampre–Caffita	+ 0"
9	Volodymyr Bileka (UKR)	Discovery Channel	+ 0"
10	David Etxebarria (ESP)	LA Alumínios–Liberty Seguros	+ 0"

=== 29-04-2005: Aigle-Anzère. 146.5 km. ===
Stage 3 results
Rank	Rider	Team	Time
1	Damiano Cunego (ITA)	Lampre–Caffita	3h 45' 49"
2	Denis Menchov	Rabobank	+ 0"
3	Santiago Botero (COL)	Phonak	+ 4"
4	Daniel Atienza (ESP)	Cofidis	+ 9"
5	Manuel Beltrán (ESP)	Discovery Channel	+ 9"
6	Marco Fertonani (ITA)	Domina Vacanze	+ 28"
7	Alberto Contador (ESP)	Liberty Seguros–Würth	+ 37"
8	Mauricio Ardila (COL)	Davitamon–Lotto	+ 40"
9	Alexandre Moos (SUI)	Phonak	+ 1' 02"
10	Aitor Osa (ESP)	Illes Balears–Caisse d'Epargne	+ 1' 02"

=== 30-04-2005: Châtel Saint Denis-Les Paccots, 150.2 km. ===
Stage 4 results
Rank	Rider	Team	Time
1	Alberto Contador (ESP)	Liberty Seguros–Würth	3h 40' 48"
2	Leonardo Piepoli (ITA)	Saunier Duval–Prodir	+ 4"
3	Damiano Cunego (ITA)	Lampre–Caffita	+ 11"
4	Stefano Garzelli (ITA)	Liquigas–Bianchi	+ 11"
5	Miguel Ángel Martín Perdiguero (ESP)	Phonak	+ 11"
6	Santiago Botero (COL)	Phonak	+ 11"
7	Denis Menchov	Rabobank	+ 11"
8	Marco Fertonani (ITA)	Domina Vacanze	+ 11"
9	Aitor Osa (ESP)	Illes Balears–Caisse d'Epargne	+ 11"
10	Alexandre Moos (SUI)	Phonak	+ 11"

=== 01-05-2005: Lausanne, 20.4 km. (ITT) ===
Stage 5 results
Rank	Rider	Team	Time
1	Santiago Botero (COL)	Phonak	26' 29"
2	Bradley McGee (AUS)	Française des Jeux	+ 25"
3	Óscar Pereiro (ESP)	Phonak	+ 35"
4	Damiano Cunego (ITA)	Lampre–Caffita	+ 36"
5	Stefano Garzelli (ITA)	Liquigas–Bianchi	+ 39"
6	Thomas Dekker (NED)	Rabobank	+ 49"
7	Laurent Brochard (FRA)	Bouygues Télécom	+ 49"
8	Dario Cioni (ITA)	Liquigas–Bianchi	+ 50"
9	Ángel Vicioso (ESP)	Liberty Seguros–Würth	+ 50"
10	Paolo Savoldelli (ITA)	Discovery Channel	+ 52"

== Classification standings ==
=== General classification ===
Final general classification (1–10)
Rank	Rider	Team	Time
1	Santiago Botero (COL)	Phonak	15h 58' 02"
2	Damiano Cunego (ITA)	Lampre–Caffita	+ 33"
3	Denis Menchov	Rabobank	+ 1' 18"
4	Alberto Contador (ESP)	Liberty Seguros–Würth	+ 1' 22"
5	Marco Fertonani (ITA)	Domina Vacanze	+ 1' 40"
6	Alexandre Moos (SUI)	Phonak	+ 2' 02"
7	Óscar Pereiro (ESP)	Phonak	+ 2' 29"
8	Manuel Beltrán (ESP)	Discovery Channel	+ 2' 31"
9	Daniel Atienza (ESP)	Cofidis	+ 2' 34"
10	Tadej Valjavec (SLO)	Phonak	+ 2' 57"

=== Points classification ===
Final points classification (1–10)
Rank	Rider	Team	Points
1	Stefano Garzelli (ITA)	Liquigas–Bianchi	40
2	Óscar Pereiro (ESP)	Phonak	35
3	Damiano Cunego (ITA)	Lampre–Caffita	34
4	Santiago Botero (COL)	Phonak	32
5	André Korff (GER)	T-Mobile Team	25
6	Alberto Contador (ESP)	Liberty Seguros–Würth	21
7	Bradley McGee (AUS)	Française des Jeux	21
8	Paolo Savoldelli (ITA)	Discovery Channel	21
9	Daniele Colli (ITA)	Liquigas–Bianchi	20
10	Denis Menchov	Rabobank	18

=== Mountains classification ===
Final mountains classification (1–10)
Rank	Rider	Team	Points
1	Rubén Lobato (ESP)	Saunier Duval–Prodir	46
2	Iñigo Landaluze (ESP)	Euskaltel–Euskadi	28
3	Erik Dekker (NED)	Rabobank	26
4	Joost Posthuma (NED)	Rabobank	14
5	Damiano Cunego (ITA)	Lampre–Caffita	12
6	Ruslan Ivanov (MDA)	Domina Vacanze	12
7	David Moncoutié (FRA)	Cofidis	10
8	Igor Antón (ESP)	Euskaltel–Euskadi	10
9	Denis Menchov	Rabobank	8
10	Steve Zampieri (SUI)	Phonak	8

=== Team classification ===
Final team classification (1–10)
Rank	Team	Time
1	(Switzerland) Phonak	47h 57' 46"
2	(Spain) Liberty Seguros–Würth	+ 4' 24"
3	(Spain) Saunier Duval–Prodir	+ 10' 00"
4	(United States) Discovery Channel	+ 12' 58"
5	(Denmark) Team CSC	+ 13' 04"
6	(France) Crédit Agricole	+ 14' 08"
7	(Netherlands) Rabobank	+ 14' 57"
8	(Italy) Liquigas–Bianchi	+ 15' 32"
9	(France) Cofidis	+ 16' 14"
10	(Italy) Domina Vacanze	+ 22' 41"
