= 2004 in men's road cycling =

2004 in men's road cycling is about the 2004 men's bicycle races governed by the UCI.

== World championships ==
The World Road championships were held in Verona, Italy.

Race	Date	Winner	Second	Third
World Championship Road Race	Oct 3	Óscar Freire (ESP)	Erik Zabel (GER)	Luca Paolini (ITA)
World Championship Time Trial	Sep 29	Michael Rogers (AUS)	Michael Rich (GER)	Alexander Vinokourov (KAZ)

== Grand Tours ==
Race	Date	Winner	Second	Third
(Italy) Giro d'Italia	May 8 - May 30	Damiano Cunego (ITA)	Serhiy Honchar (UKR)	Gilberto Simoni (ITA)
Tour de France	Jul 3 - Jul 25	Lance Armstrong (USA)	Andreas Klöden (GER)	Ivan Basso (ITA)
(Spain) Vuelta a España	Sep 4 - Sep 26	Roberto Heras (ESP)	Santiago Perez Fernandez (ESP)	Francisco Mancebo (ESP)

== UCI Coupe du Monde ==
Race	Date	Winner	Second	Third
(Italy) Milan–San Remo	March 3	Óscar Freire (ESP)	Erik Zabel (GER)	Stuart O'Grady (AUS)
(Belgium) Tour of Flanders / Tour des Flandres	April 4	Steffen Wesemann (GER)	Leif Hoste (BEL)	Dave Bruylandts (BEL)
(France) Paris–Roubaix	April 11	Magnus Bäckstedt (SWE)	Tristan Hoffman (NED)	Roger Hammond (GBR)
(Netherlands) Amstel Gold Race	Apr 18	Davide Rebellin (ITA)	Michael Boogerd (NED)	Paolo Bettini (ITA)
(Belgium) Liège–Bastogne–Liège	Apr 25	Davide Rebellin (ITA)	Michael Boogerd (NED)	Alexander Vinokourov (KAZ)
(Germany) HEW Cyclassics Cup-Hamburg	Aug 1	Stuart O'Grady (AUS)	Paolo Bettini (ITA)	Igor Astarloa (ESP)
(Spain) Clásica de San Sebastián	Aug 7	Miguel Ángel Martín Perdiguero (ESP)	Paolo Bettini (ITA)	Davide Rebellin (ITA)
(Switzerland) Züri-Metzgete	Aug 22	Juan Antonio Flecha (ESP)	Paolo Bettini (ITA)	Jérôme Pineau (FRA)
(France) Paris–Tours	Oct 10	Erik Dekker (NED)	Danilo Hondo (GER)	Óscar Freire (ESP)
(Italy) Giro di Lombardia	Oct 10	Damiano Cunego (ITA)	Michael Boogerd (NED)	Ivan Basso (ITA)

== 2.HC Category races ==
The prefix 2 indicates that these events are stage races.

Race	Date	Winner	Second	Third
(France) Paris–Nice	Mar 7 - Mar 14	Jörg Jaksche (GER)	Davide Rebellin (ITA)	Bobby Julich (USA)
(Italy) Tirreno–Adriatico	Mar 10 - Mar 16	Paolo Bettini (ITA)	Óscar Freire (ESP)	Erik Zabel (GER)
(Spain) Tour of the Basque Country	Apr 5 – Apr 9	Denis Menchov (RUS)	Iban Mayo (ESP)	David Etxebarria (ESP)
(Switzerland) Tour de Romandie	Apr 27 – May 2	Tyler Hamilton (USA)	Fabian Jeker (SUI)	Leonardo Piepoli (ITA)
(France) Critérium du Dauphiné Libéré	Jun 6 – Jun 13	Iban Mayo (ESP)	Tyler Hamilton (USA)	Óscar Sevilla (ESP)
(Switzerland) Tour de Suisse	Jun 12 - Jun 20	Jan Ullrich (GER)	Fabian Jeker (SUI)	Dario Cioni (ITA)
(Spain) Volta a Catalunya	Jun 14 - Jun 20	Miguel Ángel Martín Perdiguero (ESP)	Vladimir Karpets (RUS)	Roberto Laiseka (ESP)

== 1.HC Category races ==
The prefix 1 indicates that these events are one-day races.

Race	Date	Winner	Second	Third
(Belgium) Gent–Wevelgem	Apr 7	Tom Boonen (BEL)	Magnus Bäckstedt (SWE)	Jaan Kirsipuu (EST)
(Belgium) La Flèche Wallonne	Apr 21	Davide Rebellin (ITA)	Danilo Di Luca (ITA)	Matthias Kessler (GER)
GP Ouest France-Plouay	Aug 29	Didier Rous (FRA)	Serge Baguet (BEL)	Guido Trentin (ITA)
(Italy) Giro del Lazio	Sep 18	Juan Antonio Flecha (ESP)	Gilberto Simoni (ITA)	Jan Ullrich (GER)

== 2.1 Category races ==
The prefix 2 indicates that these events are stage races.

Race	Date	Winner	Second	Third
(Spain) Setmana Catalana de Ciclisme	Mar 22 - Mar 26	Joaquim Rodríguez (ESP)	Miguel Ángel Martín Perdiguero (ESP)	Josep Jufré (ESP)
(France) Critérium International	Mar 27 - Mar 28	Jens Voigt (GER)	José Iván Gutiérrez (ESP)	Lance Armstrong (USA)
(France) Four Days of Dunkirk	May 5 - May 9	Sylvain Chavanel (FRA)	Laurent Brochard (FRA)	Didier Rous (FRA)
(France) Tour du Languedoc-Roussillon	May 19 – May 23	Christophe Moreau (FRA)	Viatcheslav Ekimov (RUS)	Iker Flores (ESP)
(Spain) Euskal Bizikleta	June 2 – Jun 6	Roberto Heras (ESP)	Roberto Laiseka (ESP)	Samuel Sánchez (ESP)
(Spain) Vuelta a Burgos	Aug 2 - Aug 5	Alejandro Valverde (ESP)	Denis Menchov (RUS)	Leonardo Piepoli (ITA)
(Netherlands) Ronde van Nederland	Aug 24 - Aug 28	Erik Dekker (NED)	Viatcheslav Ekimov (RUS)	Marc Wauters (BEL)

== 1.1 Category races ==
The prefix 1 indicates that these events are one-day races.

Race	Date	Winner	Second	Third
(Belgium) Omloop Het Volk	Feb 28	race was cancelled due to bad weather		
(Belgium) E3 Prijs Vlaanderen	Mar 27	Tom Boonen (BEL)	Jaan Kirsipuu (EST)	Andris Naudužs (LAT)
(Belgium) Scheldeprijs	Apr 14	Tom Boonen (BEL)	Robbie McEwen (AUS)	Simone Cadamuro (ITA)
(Germany) Rund um den Henninger Turm	May 1	Karsten Kroon (NED)	Danilo Hondo (GER)	Johan Coenen (BEL)
(France) Classique des Alpes	Jun 6	Óscar Pereiro (ESP)	Iban Mayo (ESP)	José Enrique Gutiérrez (ESP)
(Italy) Tre Valli Varesine	Aug 17	Fabian Wegmann (GER)	Danilo Di Luca (ITA)	Vladimir Duma (UKR)
(Switzerland) Grand Prix of Aargau Canton	Aug 29	Matteo Tosatto (ITA)	Markus Zberg (SUI)	Martin Elmiger (SUI)
(Italy) Giro del Veneto	Aug 21	Gilberto Simoni (ITA)	Matteo Tosatto (ITA)	Massimo Giunti (ITA)
(Italy) Coppa Placci	Sep 4	Leonardo Bertagnolli (ITA)	Davide Rebellin (ITA)	Filippo Simeoni (ITA)
(Belgium) Paris–Brussels	Sep 11	Nick Nuyens (BEL)	Philippe Gilbert (BEL)	Allan Johansen (DEN)
(France) Grand Prix de Fourmies	Sep 12	Andrey Kashechkin (KAZ)	Dmitriy Fofonov (KAZ)	Thor Hushovd (NOR)
(France) Grand Prix des Nations	Sep 19	Michael Rich (GER)	Uwe Peschel (GER)	José Iván Gutiérrez (ESP)
(Italy) Giro dell'Emilia	Sep 25	Ivan Basso (ITA)	Francesco Casagrande (ITA)	Rinaldo Nocentini (ITA)
(Italy) Milano–Torino	Oct 13	Marcos Serrano (ESP)	Eddy Mazzoleni (ITA)	Francesco Casagrande (ITA)
(Italy) Giro del Piemonte	Oct 14	Allan Davis (AUS)	Alberto Ongarato (ITA)	Francesco Chicchi (ITA)

== See also ==
- 2004 in women's road cycling
