= Alexandre Moos =

Swiss mountain biker

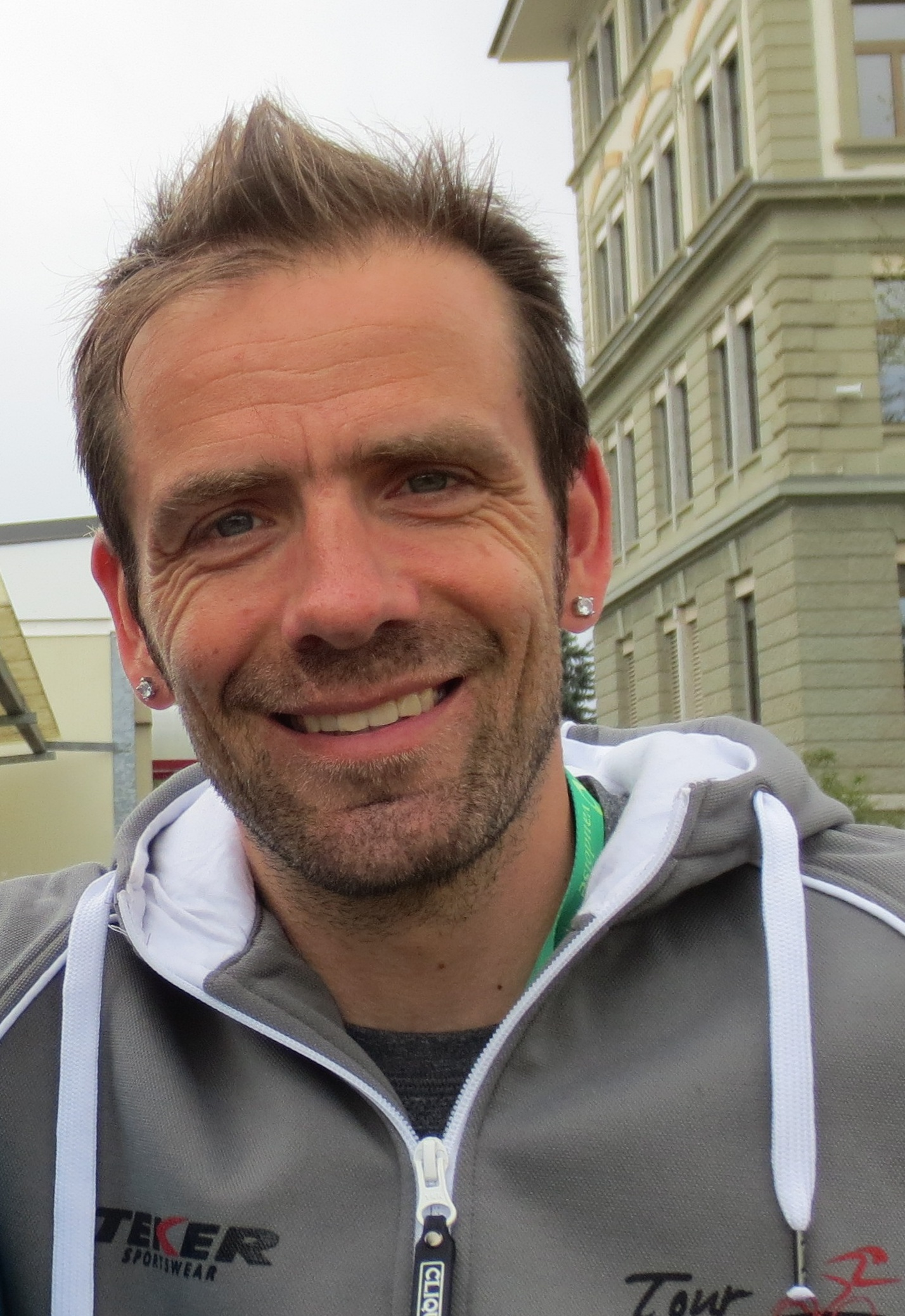
- Moos in 2013

Personal information
- Full name: Alexandre Moos
- Born: 22 December 1972 (age 53) Sierre, Switzerland

Cycling career
- Sport: Cycling
- Disciplines: Road; MTB
- Role: Rider

Professional teams
- 1996–1998: Saeco–AS Juvenes San Marino
- 1999: Festina–Lotus
- 2000: KIA-Villiger
- 2001–2006: Phonak
- 2007–2010: BMC Racing Team
- 2011–2012: BMC Mountain Biking Team

Alexandre Moos (born 22 December 1972) is a Swiss former professional road cyclist and mountain biker. Previously a member of the better-known BMC Racing Team, Moos switched to being a mountain bike specialist in 2011, as the Racing Team brought in several new members from other road teams. He was the Swiss National Road Race champion in 2002.

== Major results ==
1999
5th Route Adélie
2000
4th Overall UNIQA Classic
9th Overall Tour of Slovenia
2001
1st Giro del Mendrisiotto
4th Giro del Friuli
2002
1st Road race, National Road Championships
1st Stage 6 Tour de Suisse
5th Tour du Lac Léman
7th Overall Tour de Romandie
2003
4th GP Miguel Induráin
5th Overall Tour de Romandie
6th Overall Tour de Suisse
2004
6th Overall Tour de Romandie

1st Stage 3

2005
1st Grand Prix of Aargau Canton
3rd Berner Rundfahrt
6th Overall Tour de Romandie
2006
7th GP Triberg-Schwarzwald
8th Overall Tour de Romandie
2008
10th Overall Tour of California
