= Andy Rihs =

Andy Rihs (2 November 1942 in Stuttgart – 18 April 2018 in Zürich) was a Swiss businessperson primarily in Medtech and Sports.

== Biography ==
Andy Rihs' father Ernst had acquired the Zurich-based AG für Elektroakustik (founded: 1947) in 1965. Only one year later, after the father's death, Andy took over together with a family friend Beda Diethelm. Andy Rihs' brother Hans-Ueli joined a few years later. The trio developed the company over the course of decades into the world's largest hearing aid company with 17,000 employees worldwide and an annual turnover of CHF 2.4 billion. The hearing aid company was renamed Phonak and in the new century, Sonova. In 1987, headquarters moved from Zurich to Stäfa.

A fond cycling enthusiast, Rihs had a big impact on the sport. Rihs was a hobby rider himself who climbed the big Tour de France mountain passes on his bike. He took over the BMC bicycle company in 2000 and created a carbon production facility in Grenchen where race bikes were produced which won virtually all important races of the UCI Pro Tour plus the Tour de France. The ambition was to make BMC bicycles ''the Porsche of race bikes''.

Rihs also built an 8,000-square-metre velodrome in Grenchen for Swiss Olympic athletes. and helped various bike races and the Swiss Cycling federation to survive in difficult times. In 2000, Rihs also created the Team Phonak and backed it until 2006 when cyclist Floyd Landis was stripped of his Tour de France title. From 2007, Rihs created the new team BMC Racing sponsored this time by his bicycle company. The team existed until his death in 2018 when it was subsequently renamed CCC Pro Team. In 2011, BMC Racing won the Tour de France with cyclist Cadel Evans.

Rihs also started to get involved in football. In 2004, he became co-owner of the Stadion Wankdorf (site of the FIFA World Cup Final 1954) and the BSC Young Boys football club in the Swiss federal city Bern. He narrowly didn't live to see Young Boys winning their first Swiss championship since 32 years in a game at Wankdorf against FC Luzern on 28 April 2018, only 10 days after Rihs' passing. The title was therefore also dedicated to Andy. In 2022, brother Hans-Ueli Rihs took on full ownership of the club and stadium by buying out Andy's family.

Rihs had also financed various start-up companies and owned La Coquillade, a winery with a luxury hotel in the south of France east of Avignon.
