= Phonak (cycling team) =

Swiss professional cycling team

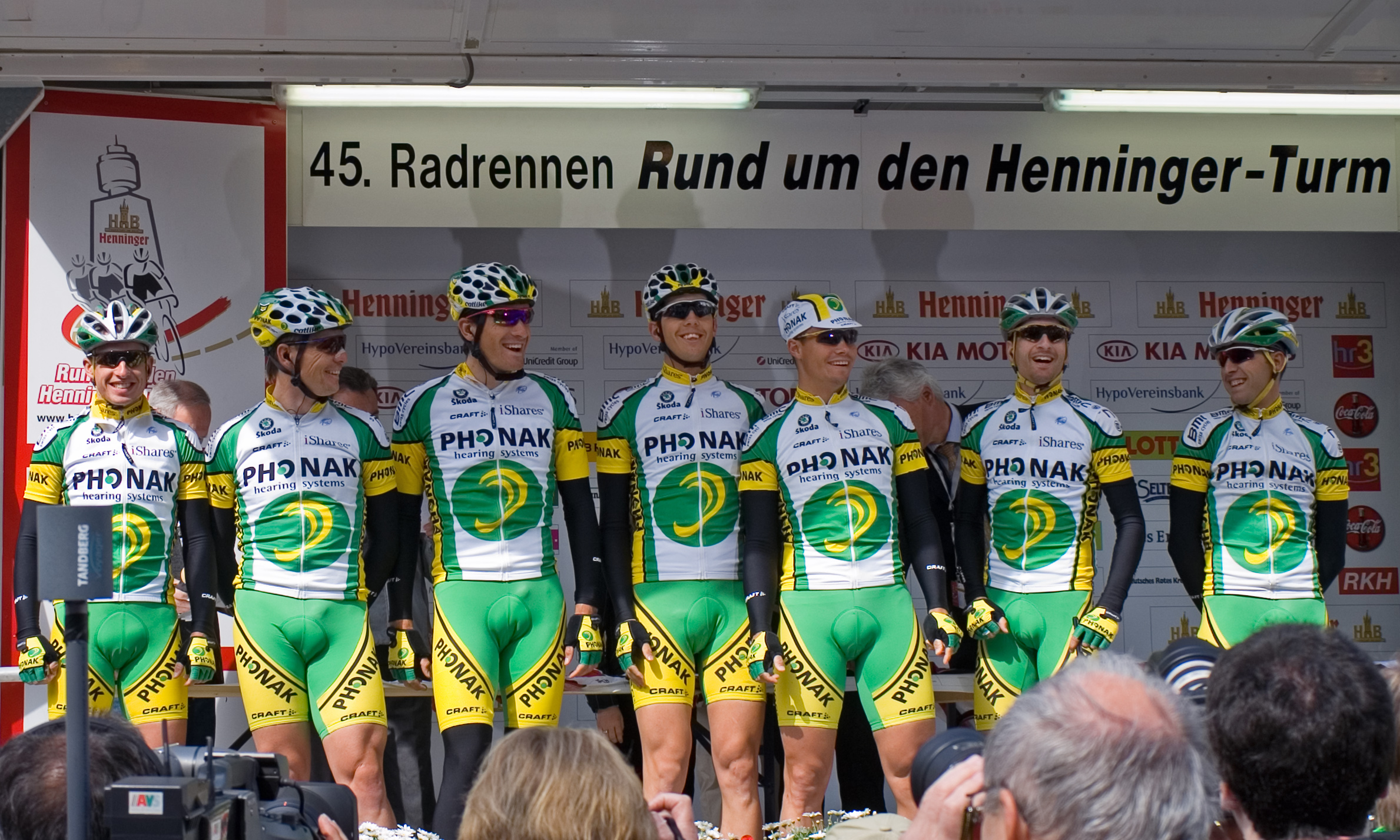
- The team in 2006

Team information
- UCI code: PHO
- Registered: Switzerland
- Founded: 2000
- Disbanded: 2006
- Discipline: Road
- Status: ProTour

Key personnel
- General manager: Andy Rihs

Team name history
- 2002–2006: Phonak

Phonak (UCI team code: PHO) was a Swiss professional cycling team from 2000 until 2006. The team was one of 20 teams in the first UCI ProTour in 2005. It won one race – Santiago Botero's victory in the Tour de Romandie – and came second in the team ranking on the 2005 ProTour circuit.

== History ==
A sponsor, iShares (subsidiary of Barclays Global Investors) signed a three-year contract in June 2006 to become the team's title sponsor from 2007. The team's name was to be iShares. Andy Rihs, owner of Phonak Hearing Systems, said on 15 August 2006 that the deal had been called off after the team's leader, Floyd Landis, tested positive for high levels of testosterone, and that the team would disband at the end of 2006.

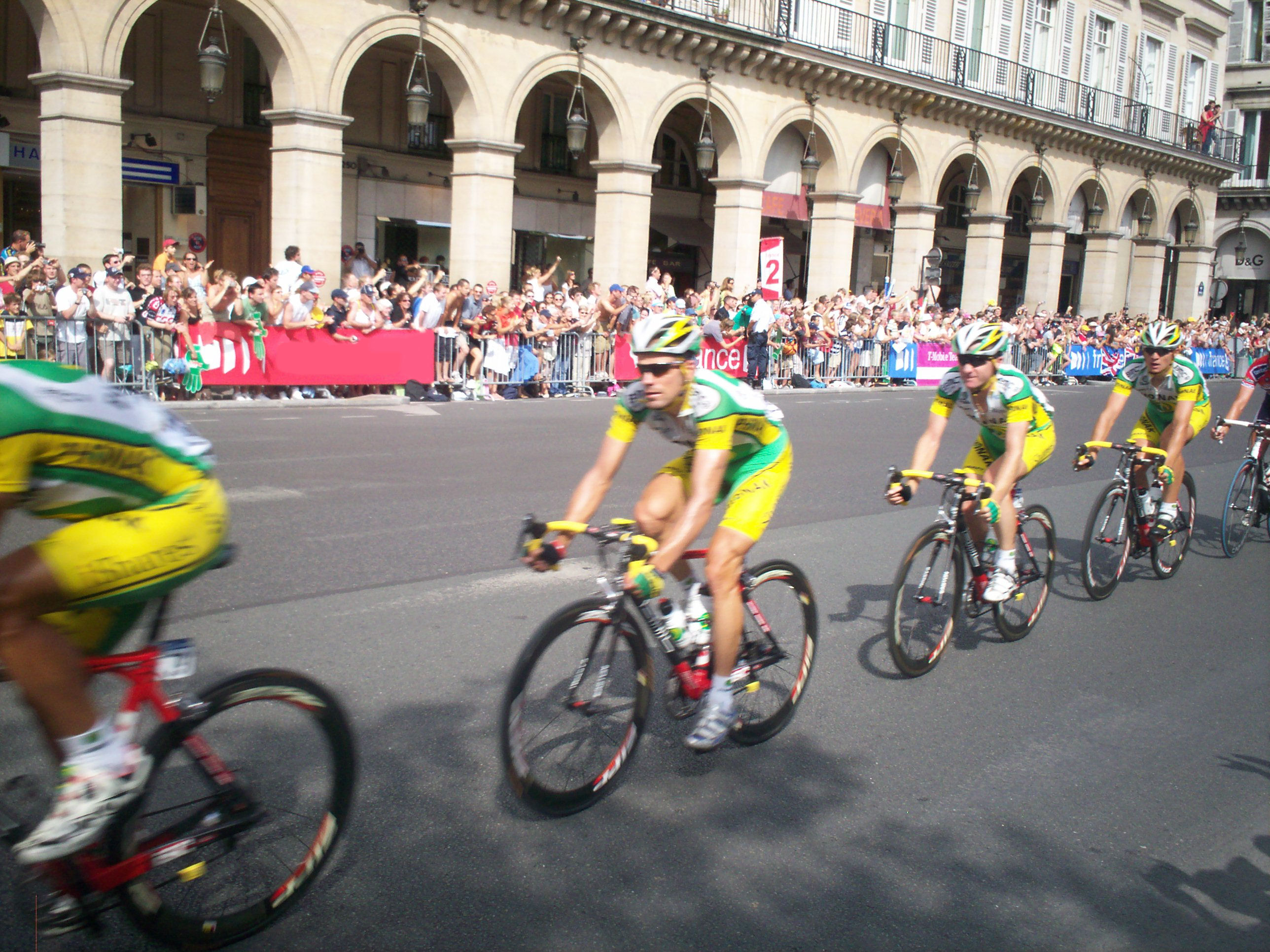
Team Phonak in Paris in the final stage of the 2006 Tour de France.

During 2004 Phonak concentrated on supporting Tyler Hamilton in the Tour de France. He crashed and withdrew and was later suspended for blood doping. Hamilton was not the last rider removed for doping, leading Phonak to stop sponsorship after 2006.

The riders accused of doping in 2004 were Hamilton, Santiago Pérez, Oscar Camenzind, Fabrizio Guidi (who was cleared) and Sascha Urweider.

On 5 August 2006 Phonak dismissed Floyd Landis after confirmation that a urine sample taken after his Stage 17 win twice tested positive for synthetic testosterone as well as a ratio of testosterone to epitestosterone nearly three times the limit allowed by World Anti-Doping Agency rules. His 2006 Tour de France win was erased from the books by the Union Cycliste Internationale on September 20, 2007.

== Team rankings ==
Phonak won the team classification at:

- 2006 Giro d'Italia – Trofeo Fast Team and Trofeo Super Team (points)
- 2006 Volta a Catalunya
- 2006 Tour of Qatar
- 2006 Paris–Nice
- 2006 Tour de Georgia

== Final roster ==
Rider	Date of birth
Santiago Botero (COL)	October 27, 1972
Aurélien Clerc (SUI)	August 26, 1979
Martin Elmiger (SUI)	September 23, 1978
Luis Fernández (ESP)	January 19, 1980
Bert Grabsch (GER)	June 19, 1975
Fabrizio Guidi (ITA)	April 13, 1972
Ignacio Gutiérrez (ESP)	December 1, 1977
José Enrique Gutiérrez (ESP)	June 18, 1974
Ryder Hesjedal (CAN)	December 9, 1980
Robert Hunter (RSA)	April 22, 1977
Nicolas Jalabert (FRA)	April 13, 1973
Floyd Landis (USA)	October 14, 1975
Miguel Ángel Martín Perdiguero (ESP)	October 14, 1972
Jonathan McCarty (USA)	January 24, 1982

Rider	Date of birth
Axel Merckx (BEL)	August 8, 1972
Koos Moerenhout (NED)	November 5, 1973
Alexandre Moos (SUI)	December 22, 1972
Steve Morabito (SUI)	January 30, 1983
Uroš Murn (SLO)	February 9, 1975
Víctor Hugo Peña (COL)	July 10, 1974
Grégory Rast (SUI)	January 17, 1980
Michael Schär (SUI)	September 29, 1986
Florian Stalder (SUI)	September 13, 1982
Johann Tschopp (SUI)	July 1, 1982
Sascha Urweider (SUI)	September 18, 1980
David Vitoria (SUI)	October 15, 1984
Steve Zampieri (SUI)	June 4, 1977

== Major wins ==
2000
Berner Rundfahrt, Lukas Zumsteg
GP Winterthur, Pierre Bourquenoud
Vorarlberg GP, Matthias Buxhofer
Wartenberg-Rundfahrt, Matthias Buxhofer
Stage 5 Tour de l'Avenir, Alexandre Usov
Chrono des Herbiers, Jean Nuttli
2001
GP de Genève, Roger Beuchat
Stage 3 & 5 Niedersachsen-Rundfahrt, Alexandre Usov
Stage 4 Niedersachsen-Rundfahrt, Bert Grabsch
Stage 5a Deutschland Tour, Matthias Buxhofer
Tour du Jura, Roger Beuchat
Stage 2 Tour de Wallonie, Bert Grabsch
Stage 4a Tour du Poitou-Charentes, Jean Nuttli
Stage 1 Tour de l'Avenir, Alexandre Usov
Switzerland Time Trial Championship, Jean Nuttli
Giro del Mendrisiotto, Alexandre Moos
Chrono des Herbiers, Jean Nuttli
2002
Clásica de Almería, Massimo Strazzer
Stausee Rundfahrt, Massimo Strazzer
Stage 2b Setmana Catalana de Ciclisme, Juan Carlos Domínguez
Stage 5 Setmana Catalana de Ciclisme, Óscar Pereiro
Stage 2, 3a & 4 Circuit de la Sarthe, Massimo Strazzer
Prologue Giro d'Italia, Juan Carlos Domínguez
Stage 6 Tour de Suisse, Alexandre Moos
Switzerland Road Race Championship, Alexandre Moos
Belarus Road Race Championship, Alexandre Usov
Overall Sachsen Tour, Oscar Camenzind

Stage 2, Oscar Camenzind

Circuito de Getxo, Martin Elmiger
Stage 1 Vuelta a Burgos, Bert Grabsch
Stage 1 Tour du Poitou-Charentes, Alexandre Usov
Stage 2 Tour de l'Avenir, Alexandre Usov
2003
Trofeo Cala Bona, Alexandre Usov
Stage 2 Circuit de la Sarthe, Massimo Strazzer
Stage 1 Clasica Alcobendas, Alexandre Usov
Stage 3b Tour de Picardie, Juan Carlos Domínguez
Stage 2b Bayern Rundfahrt, Massimo Strazzer
Grand Prix of Aargau Canton, Martin Elmiger
Stage 6 Tour de Suisse, Óscar Pereiro
Switzerland Road Race Championship, Daniel Schnider
Stage 3 Sachsen Tour, Oscar Camenzind
2004
Stage 5 Volta a la Comunitat Valenciana, Alexandre Usov
Berner Rundfahrt, Alexandre Usov
Overall Tour de Romandie, Tyler Hamilton

Stage 3 Alexandre Moos
Stage 5 Tyler Hamilton

GP Krka, Uroš Murn
Stage 3 Tour du Languedoc-Roussillon, Martin Elmiger
Classique des Alpes, Óscar Pereiro
Stage 2 Critérium du Dauphiné Libéré, José Enrique Gutiérrez
Stage 6 Tour de Suisse, Niki Aebersold
Switzerland Road Race Championship, Grégory Rast
Slovenia Road Race Championship, Uroš Murn
Stage 6 Tour of Qinghai Lake, Marco Fertonani
Olympic Games, Time Trial, Tyler Hamilton
Stage 8 Vuelta a España, Tyler Hamilton
Stage 14, 15 & 21 Vuelta a España, Santiago Pérez
Stage 20 Vuelta a España, José Enrique Gutiérrez
2005
Doha GP, Robert Hunter
Stage 5 Tour Méditerranéen, Robert Hunter
Stage 1 Setmana Catalana de Ciclisme, Uroš Murn
Stage 4 Setmana Catalana de Ciclisme, Robert Hunter
Stage 1 Tour de Georgia, Robert Hunter
Stage 3 Tour de Georgia, Floyd Landis
Overall Tour de Romandie, Santiago Botero

Prologue, Óscar Pereiro
Stage 5, Santiago Botero

Stage 1 Volta a Catalunya, Team Time Trial
Grand Prix of Aargau Canton, Alexandre Moos
Stage 3 & 6 Critérium du Dauphiné Libéré, Santiago Botero
Switzerland Road Race Championship, Martin Elmiger
Stage 6 Tour of Austria, Fabrizio Guidi
Stage 16 Tour de France, Óscar Pereiro
Rund um die Hainleite, Bert Grabsch
2006
Overall Tour of California, Floyd Landis

Stage 3, Floyd Landis

Overall Paris–Nice, Floyd Landis
Overall Tour de Georgia, Floyd Landis

Stage 3, Floyd Landis

Stage 2 Clasica Alcobendas, Aurélien Clerc
Stage 5 Tour de Suisse, Steve Morabito
Switzerland Road Race Championship, Grégory Rast
Stage 7 Tour of Austria, Fabrizio Guidi
Overall Tour de Wallonie, Fabrizio Guidi

Stage 2 & 4, Fabrizio Guidi

Stage 3 Tour de Pologne, Fabrizio Guidi

== National champions ==
2001
Switzerland Time Trial Championship, Jean Nuttli
2002
Switzerland Road Race Championship, Alexandre Moos
Belarus Road Race Championship, Alexandre Usov
2003
Switzerland Road Race Championship, Daniel Schnider
2004
Switzerland Road Race Championship, Grégory Rast
Slovenia Road Race Championship, Uroš Murn
2005
Switzerland Road Race Championship, Martin Elmiger
2006
Switzerland Road Race Championship, Grégory Rast
