= Fundacion Pro Integracion =

- Founded: 1983
- Founder: Active 20-30 Club of Panamá
- Location: Panama City, República de Panama
- Region served: Provinces.: Bocas del Toro; Chiriquí; Coclé; Colón; Darién; Herrera; Los Santos; Panamá; West Panamá; Veraguas
- Method: Grants, Donations
- Key people: President, Carlos Méndez: Executive Director, Virginia Nuñez de Alvarado
- Website: www.funproi.org

Fundacion Pro Integracion (or Fundación Pro Integración or FUNPROI) is a Panama City, República de Panama based non-profit foundation with the mission of helping economically disadvantaged children (and adults) with disabilities better integrate into mainstream Panamanian society. The foundation has an all-inclusive objective that all persons with disabilities are an important part of humanity and everyone has a valuable role. The foundation does not discriminate in regards to age, gender, or social status and services all regions of Panama. Virginia Nuñez de Alvarado has been the foundation's executive director since 1997. She previously served in executive roles in Panama's Ministry of Justice as well as for several international non-profit organizations including Planned Parenthood. FUNPROI has 17 chapters throughout Panama and has served 72,000 people, including over 39,000 children to date.

Each year Fundación Pro Integración distributes hundreds of donated wheelchairs to poor children. Approximately 800 children and adults receive donated hearing aids that cost $1,500 and more per unit. Every two years the foundation organizes a group of volunteer doctors to conduct over 200 operations for low-income children, each outreach effort focuses on serving different regions of Panama and different physical ailments depending on local population needs. Past operations have including cleft lip and eye muscle repair. In October 2014 Fundacion Pro Integracion was recognized by the Hear the World Foundation of Switzerland for their commitment to helping poor children by servicing them with hearing testing and supplying them with hearing aids.

In 2017, Hear the World Foundation donated the first cochlear implant in its ten-year history to a FUNPROI constituent. Fundacion Pro Integracion served as the local partner for this project. Three disadvantaged Panamanian children successfully received cochlear operations to date and each was guaranteed ongoing care for the implant throughout their childhood. The Hear the World Foundation published an article and video which documented the outcomes of the implants and showcased the FUNPROI partnership.
