= BSC Young Boys =

Association football club in Switzerland

Young Boys
- Full name: Berner Sport Club Young Boys
- Short name: YB; BSC
- Founded: 14 March 1898; 128 years ago
- Ground: Wankdorf Stadium
- Capacity: 32,000
- Chairman: Hanspeter Kienberger
- Manager: Gerardo Seoane
- League: Swiss Super League
- 2025–26: Swiss Super League, 6th of 12
- Website: bscyb.ch
Home colours	Away colours	Third colours

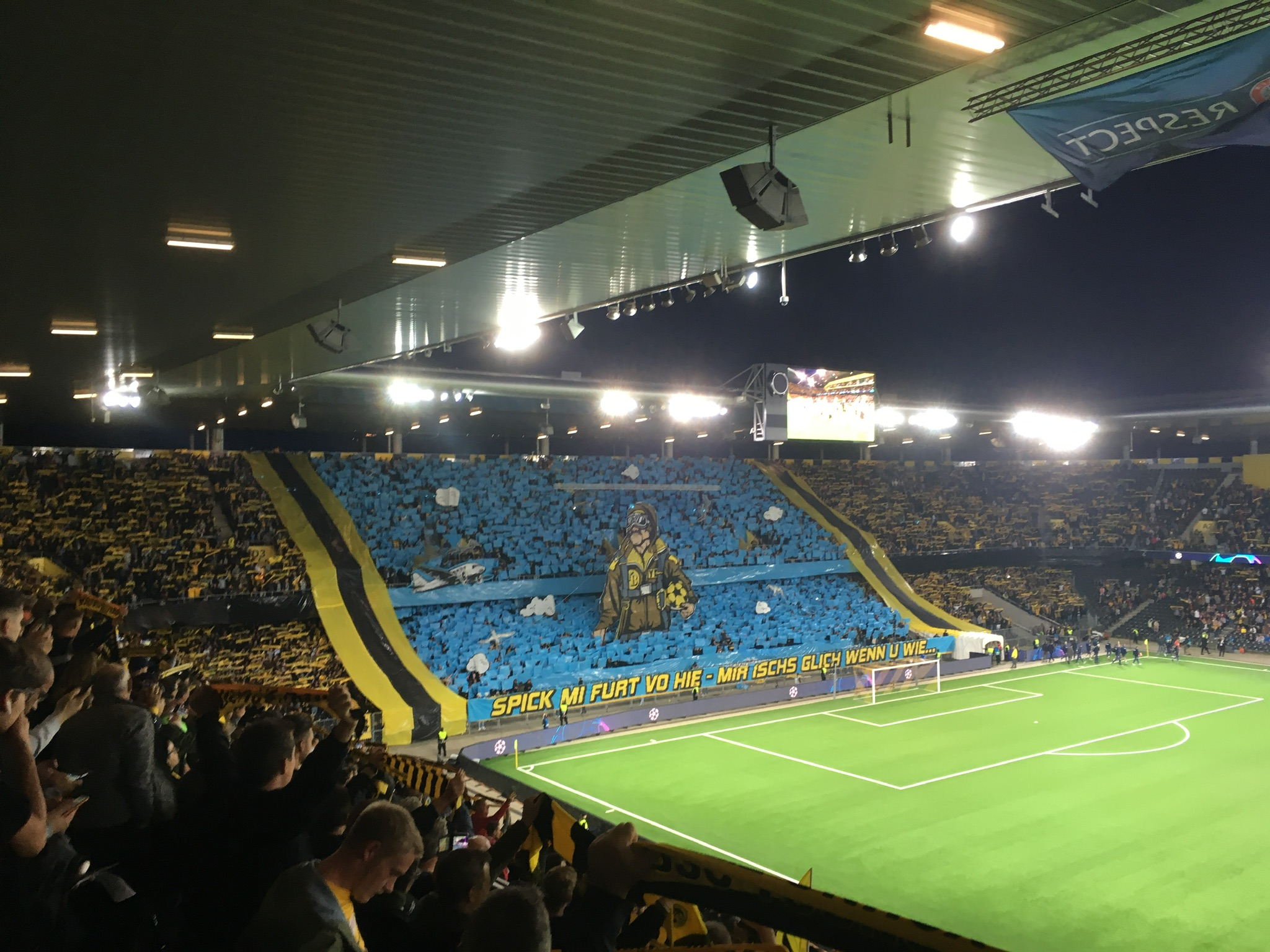
The Wankdorf Stadium before a Champions League Play Off Match in 2019

Berner Sport Club Young Boys (YB by short abbreviation, Alemannic German: [ˈiːbɛ] EE-beh) is a Swiss professional sports club based in Bern, Switzerland. Its first team has won 17 Swiss league championships and eight Swiss Cups. YB is one of the most successful Swiss football clubs internationally, reaching the semi-finals of the European Cup in the 1958–59 season. The club's colours are yellow of a golden shade and black.

== History ==
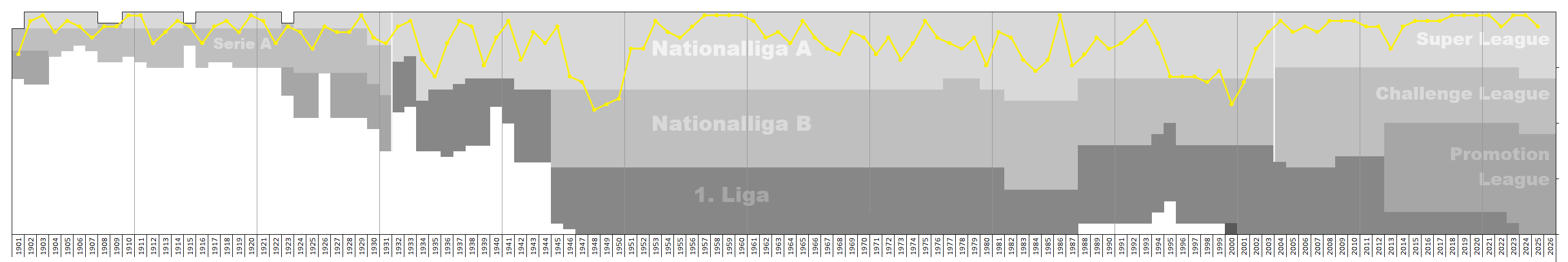
Chart of BSC Young Boys table positions in the Swiss football league system

=== 1902–1925: The early years ===
The club was founded in 1898. Its name was intended to mimic that of the Basel-based club Old Boys.

YB began to be successful very early on. Against Lausanne they celebrated a surprising 2–2 draw and on 26 October 1902 a 7–0 victory over Fortuna Basel. In these years YB also came out from the shadow of FC Bern. YB beat their city rivals away 3–1 and on 8 March 1903 5–0 at home. YB won the championship of the Central League and were invited to play in the finals of the Swiss championship. On 22 March was the first final against FC Zürich. YB played, among others, the two Schwab brothers, and they beat Zurich 3–1. On 29 March YB faced the West champion FC Neuchâtel. The guests from Neuchâtel were the clear favorites, because the Bern club had lost to them one month before 1–4. This caused Neuchâtel to make the error of underestimating the Young Boys. The Neuchâtel defense completely broke apart when the YB striker Walter Frey found the net shortly after halftime to post a 1–0 lead. The game ended with a one-sided 5–0 result, and YB after only five years of existence had won their first Swiss football championship.

After having trained for the early years on the Schwellenmätteli, below the Kirchenfeld bridge, YB played from the year 1904 at Spitalacker-Platz. In subsequent seasons the Young Boys did not win the championship but were always in the top three in the regional group. It took six years for YB to achieve further successes. In 1909, the Bernese defeated FC Winterthur in Basel in the finals 1–0. The next year, the Young Boys won the championship finals against FC Aarau 3–1 and against Servette Geneva 2–1. Again in 1911, Servette Geneva and FC Zürich could not prevent YB's fourth championship overall and third in a row. It was the first title hat trick in the history of the Swiss Football Association. YB was also in 1910 and the two following years the champion of the "Anglo-cup", the predecessor of today's Swiss Cup.

At the time, the fans spoke of a time all opponents dreaded, the "YB Quarter Hour" 15 minutes before the end of the game. The players sustained their efforts throughout the 90 minutes so effectively that the opponents began to run down after about 75 minutes. An example is the 1910 finals between the YB and Aarau, where until the 80th minute the score stood at 1–1. Similarly, in the game against Servette in the final round in 1911, up through the 72nd minute the game was a 1–1 draw, but three goals in the last 18 minutes turned the result decisively for YB to clinch the title hat trick.

In 1913, the English football instructor Reynold Williams became the first coach of the club. Shortly thereafter, World War I erupted, and Spitalacker-Platz was converted to a potato field. YB arranged to rent facilities at Kirchfeld for 1,400 francs per year. The military also made space available at the barracks for the team's use. Despite these hardships, the club won Swiss league championship again in 1920.

After the war, the team again played on the Spitalacker-Platz. However, the ground no longer suited the requirements of the Young Boys, so they searched for alternatives. They found space at the northeastern border of the city at the Wankdorffeld, and construction was initiated.

=== 1925–1951: New name and new stadium ===
In 1925, the association's name was changed from FC Young Boys to Berner Sport Club Young Boys. This year was also the last game on the old Spitalacker-platz. In October, the new Wankdorf Stadium by the architects Scherler & Berger was opened with a tournament. It was attended by the Old Boys from Basel, Servette Geneva, and the Young Boys. The new sports complex included a main grandstand with 1,200 covered seats, a restaurant, changing rooms, a training hall and a training ground. In total, the new stadium held 22,000 spectators, including covered standing room for 5,000. YB now had a large and modern stadium, which intensified the rivalry with FC Bern, because the older association continued to play at the small and outdated Neufeldplatz. The two clubs went so far as to negotiate a contract, facilitated by Central President Schlegel, to prevent discord.

In 1929, YB once again progressed to the final round of the Swiss championship. The first game, on a Sunday, pitted Urania Geneva Sport against YB, the second a week later Grasshoppers against Urania GC, and on the third Sunday in the final YB–GC. The first game in Geneva ended with a 0–0 draw, which satisfied the Bernese. When the Grasshoppers beat Geneva in Zurich 3–0, the chances for YB to win the title decreased tremendously. In the third game, the guests from Zürich needed only a draw to win the championship for the third time in a row. For this final on 30 June, Young Boys deployed replacement goalkeeper Erich Jung in the offensive midfield position due to player shortages. Striker Johan Baumgartner also scored a goal and YB prevented the championship hat trick with a 2–0 win.

On 10 February 1930, the club purchased an additional strip of land from the community, having noted that the stadium was too small, increasing the entire area of the Wankdorf stadium ground to 35,585 square metres. The 1930 Young Boys became the first to celebrate a Swiss Cup championship. The Swiss Cup had been initiated only five years earlier following the discontinuation of the Anglo Cup at the First World War. With 30,000 spectators crowding Wankdorf YB beat FC Aarau 1–0. In the following 15 years, YB won neither a league title nor a cup championship.

During this time, Wankdorf continued to expand. The capacity of the stadium increased by building an extension to 42,000 spectators, costing the association an additional 300,000 francs. Furthermore, another training field was added.

Towards the end of the 1930s, the world economic crisis started and Swiss football felt the effects. The attendance figures fell steadily, and the Sportplatz Spitalacker could no longer meet its financial obligations. After the outbreak of World War II, the club considered selling the stadium. However, through a debt-reduction and the help of the city of Bern in 1943, the finances of the club were rehabilitated. At that point, the stadium group changed its name to "Verein Fussball-Stadion Wankdorf".

During World War II, the Bernese succeeded but could not claim a title. Only in 1945, at the end of the war, came the next success: YB won the second Cup against FC St. Gallen with a 2–0 victory at Espenmoos. Two seasons later, the Bernese were relegated to the National League B. It would be three seasons until they returned to the highest league where they would then remain for over 50 years.

=== 1951–1964: The golden years under Coach Albert Sing ===
In 1951, Norbert Eric Jones was replaced after only one year as the manager by the previously unknown Albert Sing. At that time, no one anticipated the successful years YB would experience under the German coach. Sing acted initially as a player-coach before he decided to become a trainer only. During his tenure YB experienced its most successful period. The team was reinforced by high-level transfers such as Eugene "Geni" Meier. Considerable success during this period was also attributed to the goalkeeper Walter Eich, who was one of the best in the history of the Young Boys. Later, the team consisted of top players like Heinz Schneite and Ernst Wechselberger.

For the 1954 FIFA World Cup, the capacity of the Wankdorf stadium was increased from around 30,000 to more than 60,000 seats.

In the spring of 1953, Young Boys again advanced to the Cup. YB met Grasshoppers Zürich in the final pairing, and the clubs drew 1–1. Five weeks later, the teams met in a replay, which went to the Bernese 3–1. In the summer of that year, YB was invited to tour North America. The team played there against some American teams, Liverpool (1–1), and the Republic of Ireland national team (a 4–1 win for YB). YB produced impressive results overseas for Swiss football and was enthusiastically received by thousands upon its return to Bern. From 1957 and 1960, YB were Swiss champions four times in a row. During this time, YB became one of the more successful teams in European football and was superior to all Swiss opponents. 1958 brought yet another Cup when YB defeated Grasshoppers in a final replay, 4–1.

Young Boys also achieved success in European competition. At its first appearance in the European Cup, it were politically disadvantaged, however: the Bernese drew the Vasas Budapest, the Hungarian club of the Interior Ministry. Some Swiss politicians demanded that no Swiss sports club should have contacts with the Hungarian football club, especially in Bern, the capital. Servette FC made its Charmilles Stadium available for one game, and 20,000 spectators supported YB in Geneva during a 1–1 draw against the Hungarians. In the return match, however, Young Boys fell 1–2. The following year, Young Boys' opponents in the European Cup were once again from Hungary, this time MTK Budapest. YB won the leg in the Nep Stadium 2–1. 26 November 1958 saw the European premiere in Wankdorf; 28,000 spectators celebrated the Young Boys' 4–1 victory.

In the second round, YB met the East German champions SC Wismut Chemnitz and the Wankdorf was filled with 32,000 spectators. The teams drew 2–2 after a 2–0 lead for the Young Boys. A week later, the teams met in the GDR. The game ended 0–0, which at that time required a deciding game. This took place on 1 April 1959 in the Amsterdam Olympic Stadium before 35,000 spectators, and YB won 2–1. Thus, Young Boys qualified for the European Cup semi-finals. Their opponents in the semi-finals were Stade de Reims.

The game of games in the history of the yellow-and-black took place on 15 April 1959, a rainy Wednesday. Sixty-thousand spectators packed into Wankdorf, but the crowd may have exceeded the official count. After an impressive performance, YB won 1–0 on a Geni Meier goal in the 13th minute. The game was a legend in Bern. Stade de Reims received the Bernese in the return match at the Parc des Princes, Paris, where the Frenchmen won 3–0 to reach the final. No other Swiss team besides FC Zürich has since found as much success in an international competition as Young Boys did in this season.

In 1960, YB played internationally once again, meeting Eintracht Frankfurt in the first round, where Frankfurt won 4–1 before 36,000 spectators. In the return match at Frankfurt's Waldstadion, YB managed a 1–1 draw. In 1961, the team first travelled to Ireland to meet Limerick, where YB won with an impressive 5–0 showing, then again 4–2 in front of 22,000 spectators at Wankdorf in the return leg. In the second round, YB met Hamburger SV (and its star striker Uwe Seeler) in what was the first European Cup game in that team's history. Forty-five thousand spectators were at the game in the Wankdorf, where Hamburg stunned YB with a 5–0 victory. In Hamburg, the Bernese improved upon their previous performance, earning a 3–3 draw before 40,000 spectators in the Volksparkstadion. It would be the last appearance in Europe for YB for a long time.

After four league titles, a European Cup run and many successes, Young Boys traveled 31 days through the Far East, in five weeks having visited ten countries and played several friendly matches against Asian teams.

Albert Sing left BSC Young Boys in 1964 and is still the most successful coach in the history of the club.

=== 1964–1984: Averageness ===
The successor to Albert Sing had large shoes to fill; average performance was no longer acceptable to the discriminating Bernese supporters. Heinz Bigler and Hans Grütter took over the training until Hans Merkle ultimately succeeded Sing. Merkle had the misfortune to be measured against the championships of his predecessor. Although Geni Meier, Ernst Wechselberger and other players from the championship years continued to play, it mattered little. Merkle was a demanding coach of the German school, however, and was able to keep YB in the top half of the table, with finishes of second, fifth, and seventh. The mixture of old and young players did not provide the results the Bernese sought, however.

Otto Messerli, then a junior in the first team squad who in later years would be captain of the Young Boys, described the situation: "There were many good ideas, but FC Basel and FC Zürich remained unattainable for us." This was also no different for the Merkle successors Skiba, Schneiter und Eich, Brülls, Peters and Linder: The Young Boys reached big games on occasion (such as the Cup final against Basel that brought 52,000 spectators to the Wankdorf), but over the long term their performance was unspectacular. Still, some YB players rose to national recognition. The Dutchman Bert Theunissen replaced Meier and Wechselberger in 1964 as "gunner" and he became Swiss scoring champion before he left YB. A good replacement for him was found, however: the Bernese bought Dieter Brenninger from Bayern Munich. Another new transfer, Walter "Wale" Mueller, played between 1967 and 1972 for YB, and was a dreaded striker for opposing defenders.

In the late 1960s and '70s, the Bernese met with little success. As YB were runners-up in the 1974–75 season, they finally returned to European competition. In the first round of the UEFA Cup, the club faced Hamburger SV once again. In the first leg before 17,000 spectators in the Wankdorf, the two teams played to a 0–0 draw. HSV won at home in its Volksparkstadion (4–2), and Young Boys were bounced from the competition early. The Young Boys' side for these games included Jakob Brechbühl and Karl Odermatt among others.

It took until 1977 before YB would again win a title. Under coach Kurt Linder, the Cup was brought to Bern for the fifth time. Thanks to this title, YB qualified for the preliminary round of the European Cup Winners' Cup. The Bernese faced a daunting challenge in the form of the Rangers of Glasgow. At Ibrox Park, YB played strongly, only losing 0–1. The return game in front of 17,000 spectators at Wankdorf ended 2–2, and Rangers advanced. The Young Boys again underwent a change of coaches when René Hüssy replaced Linder. 1979 again saw YB (as losing cup finalists) in the European Cup Winners' Cup. On 19 September 1979, only 6,700 spectators came to Wankdorf to see the game against Steaua București, which ended 2–2. Before this game, YB had lost three consecutive championship games, which may have contributed to the lack of fans. The goals were scored by Stoica, Zwygart, Iordănescu and Schönenberger. Two weeks later, Young Boys lost in Bucharest, 0–6.

=== 1984–1991: Mandziara era ===
Turbulent times continued in the Wankdorf. After many coaching changes, in 1984 Alexander Mandziara was hired as manager. The quiet Pole with a German passport played offensive football and was known for hard training sessions. In his first years, Young Boys reached only ninth place. In the next season, 1985–86, not all went for YB but the team still managed to finish the preliminary round in fifth. During the winter break, the Swede Robert Prytz joined the YB midfield as a playmaker alongside Georges Bregy, and YB achieved an incomparable return round. The point advantage of the leaders Neuchâtel Xamax slowly melted round by round. On 24 May 1986, the showdown came in Neuchâtel Maladière before a crowd of 21,500 including visiting YB spectators. Young Boys came away with a 4–1 result. Lars Lunde, Danish scoring champion, and Dario Zuffi each connected twice and YB after 26 years finished in championship position.

In the first round of the European championship, the Bernese drew Real Madrid, whose ranks included top stars Hugo Sánchez and Emilio Butragueño. Thirty-two thousand spectators descended on Wankdorf, despite torrential rain, for the match on 17 September 1986. Urs Bamert headed in a goal to provide the 1–0 margin of victory against the guests from Spain. For the return leg, 75,000 spectators occupied the Santiago Bernabéu Stadium in Madrid. Until the 75th minute, the advantage stood at only 1–0 for the home side. But the 2–0 by Jorge Valdano broke the defense of the Young Boys, and Real Madrid went on to win 5–0.

In 1987, YB won the Cup for the sixth time. In the finals, it defeated Servette FC 4–2 in a replay. In the first round of the UEFA Cup Winners' Cup, Young Boys traveled to Dunajská Streda, Czechoslovakia, where the Slovak team won 2–1. Before 8,100 spectators, YB prevailed in Bern 3–1 and qualified for the second round. In the round of 16, the Bernese visited FC Den Haag, where it lost 1–2. In the return match in Bern, only 6,400 spectators braved the icy chill of the Wankdorf. A 1–0 YB victory was enough to progress into the quarter-finals. The next opponent was again from the Netherlands, this time Ajax of Amsterdam. Temperatures of −6 on 9 March 1988 caused Wankdorf to be rather sparsely occupied with only 7,686 spectators. Ajax won the game 1–0. The return leg in Amsterdam before 30,000 spectators saw the Bernese lose again 1–0 to fall out of the competition.

=== 1991–2001: Down and up ===
A highlight of the 1990s was the Cup finale against FC Sion in 1991. The Wankdorf was packed with 50,000 spectators, with both teams contributing to the atmosphere. At halftime, the Bernese led 2–0, but Sion shot back in the second half with three goals to win the Cup. In 1993, YB qualified for the UEFA Cup and met Celtic in the first round. Only 7,300 spectators came to the stadium for the home leg, and the game ended 0–0. Young Boys fell in Celtic Park in Glasgow before 21,500 spectators in extra time, 1–0, with André Baumann netting an own goal in the 105th minute.

In the mid-1990s, the former football powerhouse increasingly experienced problems. Young Boys developed financial difficulties and in 1997 – for the first time since the 1946–47 season – YB was relegated to the National League B (today's Challenge League). New Swedish coaches Roland Andersson and Thomas Sjöberg helped the club recover, placing first and earning promotion again, with Robert Schober and Admir Smajic taking over on the bench. The following NLA season began with a surprise victory over the reigning champion Grasshoppers. Many defeats, however, forced the Young Boys back into the relegation play-offs. The economic and sporting emergency ended in the dismissal of coach Claude Ryf. The BSC Young Boys organization stood very close to bankruptcy and few thought it still possible to salvage YB. A Lucerne investment company saved the club from ruin, although by 1999 the debt was over 1.7 million Swiss francs (~€1.08 million).

Almost the entire squad left the capital and YB competed with the shell of a team the next season. The result was disastrous: third-last place after the 1999 qualification/descent round. The possibility of further relegation to the 1st League (third tier) threatened. Marco Schällibaum took over as manager and brought in reinforcements, which had a positive impact and enabled the club to stay up. On 17 December 1999, the BSC Young Boys AG was established with capital of CHF 500,000 (~€320,000). The AG took over the operations of the first time and increased the share capital. The remaining operation remains under the previous organization.

The next championship was contested with a more powerful team with new players such as Harutyun Vardanyan and Gürkan Sermeter. YB won victory after victory in the autumn and inspired the loyal fans with attractive offensive football. The team earned the top place in the table and participation in the promotion playoffs, ultimately returning to the top division.

New enthusiasm developed in Bern, and the attendance figures rose significantly. The first game of the 2001–02 season was the final game in old Wankdorf stadium. YB drew FC Lugano 1–1 before 22,200 spectators, and the last goal for the Bernese in the old Wankdorf was tallied by Reto Burri.

=== 2001–2005: In the Neufeldstadion ===
Young Boys played at the Neufeldstadion at the north end of town until the new, multi-functional Stade de Suisse Wankdorf Bern was opened in 2005.

In the autumn of 2001, with a 1–3 home defeat against Grasshoppers, a series of 25 home games without defeat came to an end. However, with a 1–0 victory in the last game against FC St. Gallen on 9 December 2001, Young Boys qualified for the final round for the first time in seven years. The start of the final round was very promising. YB played exciting football and contended for a place in an international competition but ultimately finished in seventh position. The team also reached the semi-finals of the Swiss Cup before falling in a penalty shootout to FC Basel.

In 2002, YB finished the qualifying round in seventh and the final round in fourth place, earning the Young Boys an entry in an international competition (the UEFA Cup) for the first time in ten years. This season also saw Stéphane Chapuisat move to the club. Chapuisat is considered one of the best strikers in Swiss history.

In 2003, the league was completely reformed, including the names and sizes of the two highest leagues. For the 2003–04 season, Hans-Peter Zaugg was named as the new head coach. The played in the first "Super League", taking second place. As a result, the team entered the second qualifying round of the 2004–05 Champions League, where they fell to Red Star Belgrade 5–2 on aggregate. The domestic season 2004–05 found them finishing in fourth place.

=== 2005–2018: In the new Wankdorf Stadium ===
In the summer of 2005, Young Boys began using the newly built Wankdorfstadion, the Stade de Suisse, after several years of construction.

Only a few months later Gernot Rohr signed as a coach. Although team maintained a defensive football strategy, the club succeeded with him at its head, advancing to the Cup final, but losing on a penalty shoot-out to Sion. The first season at the Stade de Suisse Wankdorf, YB finished in third place, qualifying for the UEFA Cup. The Bernese defeated Mika of Armenia 4–1 on aggregate in the first qualifying round to set up a very attractive matchup with French giants Marseille, but narrowly lost the tie on away goals with draws 3–3 at home and 0–0 away.

Coach Gernot Rohr was succeeded by Martin Andermatt. The debut of Andermatt was promising, as YB defeated their canton rivals Thun 5–1 to open 2006–07 league play. The team finished the season in fourth place, once again returning to the UEFA Cup. On 14 April 2007, the club president Peter Mast announced that he would resign his position at the end of the season, although he immediately joined the board of directors. His post as president was assumed by Thomas Grimm on 17 April 2007. Incidentally, in this season, with an average of 15,517 spectators in the championship, the club celebrated its highest attendance average in club history.

Young Boys finished runners-up in the 2009–10 season, finishing three points behind champions Basel despite losing only one match at home all season. It entered Champions League qualification and defeated Fenerbahçe to set up a meeting with Tottenham Hotspur in the play-off round. YB went out to a 3–0 lead in the opening leg at Stade de Suisse on Tuesday 17 August, but had to hold on for a 3–2 win, then, fell 4–0 at White Hart Lane eight nights later and went out of the competition. Following its defeat, Young Boys was dropped to the Europa League group stage. The Bernese club qualified for the knockout stage of the tournament as runners-up of its group, behind group leaders VfB Stuttgart and at the expense of Getafe and Odense. In the Round of 32, the club faced Zenit Saint Petersburg, defeating its Russian opponents at home in the first leg (2–1), but suffering elimination after the second leg, losing 3–1 in their visit at Saint Petersburg.

In the 2010–11 season, the club finished third in the league, which qualified YB to the UEFA Europa League for the next season. The following season was similar for the Yellow-Blacks, finishing third once again in the league. In the same season, YB failed to reach the Europa League group stage after being eliminated by Braga 2–2 on aggregate on the away goals rule (0–0 in Braga; 2–2 in Bern).

=== 2018–present: Return to dominance ===
On 28 April 2018, following a 2–1 home win over Luzern, Young Boys were confirmed as 2017–18 Swiss Super League champions, their first league title in 32 years.

On 28 August 2018, Young Boys qualified to UEFA Champions League Group stage for the first time in their history, after defeating Dinamo Zagreb with a 3–2 aggregate score in play-off round.

In April 2019, Young Boys secured their 13th title in club history. In the next season, manager Gerardo Seoane led the club to a domestic double, delivering their 14th league title (their third in a row) and seventh cup title and first in over 30 years. The club would go on win the league title again in the 2020–21 season. Seoane left to join Bundesliga club Bayer 04 Leverkusen following the 2021 title success and was replaced by former Huddersfield Town and Schalke 04 manager David Wagner on 10 June 2021.

Under Wagner, Young Boys were able to qualify for the Champions League group stage, beating Slovan Bratislava, Cluj, and Ferencváros in the qualifier. They were seeded into Group F with Atalanta, Villarreal, and English giants Manchester United. In their first game in the Champions League, YB shocked Manchester United, beating them 2–1 thanks to a goal by Jordan Pefok in the 95th minute. The team was unable to continue their good performance and exited the tournament in last place of their group.

The harsh schedule in the first half of the season took its toll on the team and by the winter break, they saw themselves only in third place in the Super League, eleven points behind leader FC Zürich. Despite gaining 15 points in seven games after the break and overtaking FC Basel in second place, their deficit to the leader expanded to 15 points. In particular, a last minute equalizer by Grasshopper and giving away a 3–0 lead to FC St. Gallen worried club management. David Wagner was released by mutual agreement on 7 March 2022. In the interim, assistant coach Matteo Vanetta took over coaching duties until the end of the season.

On 2 June 2022, Raphaël Wicky was announced as the new head coach for the upcoming season. In his first season, he achieved the domestic double, winning the clubs eight cup and 16th Swiss championship. On 4 March 2024, he was dismissed as head coach due to stagnating results, with U21 coach Joël Magnin taking over on an interim basis.

On 14 May 2024, Patrick Rahmen was announced as the coach for the upcoming 2024–25 season. He signs a two-year contract with Young Boys. He was dismissed after just 99 days on 8 October 2024, following the worst league start in the 21st century, with just six points in nine games. Joël Magnin will once again step into the caretaker role until a permanent replacement is found. On 18 December 2024, Giorgio Contini was announced as the new head coach. He went on to lead Young Boys to a third place finish in the 2024–25 Swiss Super League. On 31 October 2025, Contini himself was relieved of his duties due to a run of inconsistent results, including a heavy 5–0 loss to FC Lausanne-Sport

== Stadium ==
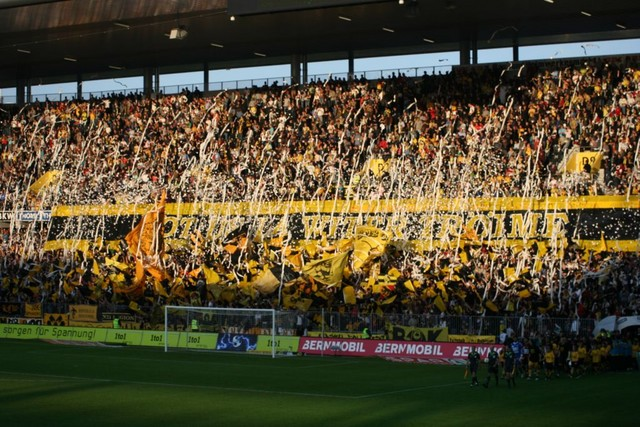
BSC Young Boys supporters

Since 2005 Young Boys has played its home matches at Stadion Wankdorf. The stadium seats 31,120 spectators and is the second largest football stadium in Switzerland, after St. Jakob-Park. Between 2005 and 2020 the stadium was named Stade de Suisse Wankdorf, the name arising from the fact that the Wankdorf ought to act as a National Stadium. As one of the few stadiums with artificial turf, however, national team matches are rarely held there. The artificial pitch allows Young Boys to hold daily training sessions at the stadium as Young Boys doesn't have a training center. For UEFA Euro 2008, a natural grass field was laid to allow three group stage matches to take place. The stadium is also the largest stadium-integrated solar power plant in the world. On the roof of the Stade de Suisse are enough solar cells to generate 700,000 kWh. This requires approximately 300,000 square meters of panels i.e. 30 hectares. The electricity powers the stadium and some houses around the Wankdorf area.

The total construction cost of the project was 350 million francs which was at the time more than any other building in Switzerland. The building (and the club) are both owned by businessman Hans-Ueli Rihs who together with his late brother Andy has financed Young Boys since taking ownership at the beginning of the millennium. Andy died on April 18, 2018, just 10 days before YB won the championship.

Between 1925 and 2001 Young Boys had played in the historic Wankdorf Stadium located on the same spot as the new stadium. While the new stadium was being constructed, Young Boys played its home games at Stadion Neufeld.

== Kits ==
- Current sports brand: Nike
- Home kit:Yellow shirt, black shorts, yellow socks.
- Away kit: Black shirt, yellow or black shorts, black socks.
- Third kit: White shirt, white shorts and white socks.

== Honours ==
BSC Young Boys honours
Type	Competition	Titles	Seasons
Domestic	Swiss Super League	17	1902–03, 1908–09, 1909–10, 1910–11, 1919–20, 1928–29, 1956–57, 1957–58, 1958–59, 1959–60, 1985–86, 2017–18, 2018–19, 2019–20, 2020–21, 2022–23, 2023–24
Domestic	Swiss Cup	8	1929–30, 1944–45, 1952–53, 1957–58, 1976–77, 1986–87, 2019–20, 2022–23
Domestic	Swiss League Cup	1	1975–76

=== International Distinctions ===
- Coppa delle Alpi
  - Winners: 1974
- European Cup/UEFA Champions League
  - Semi-final: 1958–59
- European Cup Winners' Cup
  - Quarter-final: 1987–88
- UEFA Europa League
  - Round of 16: 2020–21

== Current squad ==
As of 23 September 2026

Note: Flags indicate national team as defined under FIFA eligibility rules; some limited exceptions apply. Players may hold more than one non-FIFA nationality.

No.	Pos.	Nation	Player
1	GK	SUI	Marvin Keller
2	DF	ENG	Ryan Andrews
4	DF	GER	Moritz Jenz
5	DF	SUI	Gregory Wüthrich
6	MF	SUI	Edimilson Fernandes
7	FW	FRA	Alan Virginius
8	MF	BIH	Armin Gigović
9	FW	SEN	Kaly Sène
10	MF	SUI	Alvyn Sanches
12	MF	FRA	Herba Guirassy
13	MF	CZE	Dominik Pech
15	DF	SUI	Cédric Zesiger
16	MF	SUI	Christian Fassnacht

No.	Pos.	Nation	Player
17	DF	GAM	Saidy Janko
18	GK	CYP	Joël Mall
22	DF	SUI	Isaac Schmidt
23	DF	SUI	Loris Benito (captain)
24	DF	SUI	Benjamin Kabeya
27	DF	SUI	Lewin Blum
30	MF	SUI	Sandro Lauper
31	FW	GUI	Facinet Conte
33	DF	SRB	Stefan Bukinac
34	MF	SUI	Edin Etoski
40	GK	SUI	Dario Marzino
99	FW	COD	Samuel Essende

=== Out on loan ===
Note: Flags indicate national team as defined under FIFA eligibility rules; some limited exceptions apply. Players may hold more than one non-FIFA nationality.

No.	Pos.	Nation	Player
—	GK	SUI	Ruben Salchli (at Kriens until 30 June 2027)
—	DF	SUI	Olivier Mambwa (at Thun until 30 June 2027)
—	DF	SUI	Stevan Raicevic (at Rapperswil-Jona until 30 June 2027)
—	DF	SUI	Rhodri Smith (at Baník Ostrava until 30 June 2027)
—	DF	FRA	Tanguy Zoukrou (at Kocaelispor until 30 June 2027)

No.	Pos.	Nation	Player
—	MF	GAM	Ebrima Colley (at Konyaspor until 30 June 2027)
—	MF	KOS	Lutfi Dalipi (at Vaduz until 30 June 2027)
—	MF	SUI	Elio Rufener (at Kriens until 30 June 2027)
—	FW	SUI	Janis Lüthi (at Neuchâtel Xamax until 30 June 2027)
—	FW	VEN	Sergio Córdova (at Batman Petrolspor until 30 June 2027)

== Club officials ==
Position	Staff
Sporting director	(Switzerland) Steve von Bergen
Manager	(Switzerland) Gerardo Seoane
Assistant managers	(Romania) Zoltán Kádár (Switzerland) Matteo Vanetta (Switzerland) Patrick Schnarwiler
Goalkeeper coach	(Switzerland) Christoph Born
Conditioning Coach	(Switzerland) Martin Fryand
Athletic coach	(Switzerland) Stephan Flückiger
Match Analyst	(Switzerland) Frank Lieberfeldt
Trainer Scout	(Switzerland) Erich Hänzi
Chief Scout	(Switzerland) Stéphane Chapuisat
Club Doctor	(Switzerland) Thomas Ringgenberg (Switzerland) Jan Montagne
Physiotherapist	(Switzerland) Thomas Breitenmoser
Team Official	(Switzerland) Nico Zaugg
Chief Instructor	(Switzerland) Ernst Graf (Switzerland) Gérard Castella
Loan Player Manager	(Switzerland) Patrik Schuler
Academy manager	(Switzerland) Christian Franke

== Managers ==
- (England) Reynold Williams (1913–18)
- (England) Jimmy Hogan (1 July 1918 – 30 June 1920)
- Berth Smith (1920–24)
- Sandy Higgens (1924–28)
- Ernst Meyer (1928–29)
- (Austria) Viktor Hierländer (July 1931 – June 32)
- Hans Wüthrich (1932–34)
- (Romania) Valère de Besveconny (1934)
- (Hungary) Izidor Kürschner (July 1934 – June 35)
- (Switzerland) Hans Pulver (1935–42)
- (Hungary) Béla Volentik (1 July 1942 – 30 June 1946)
- (Switzerland) William Baumgartner (Jan 1947 – June 48)
- (Austria) Fritz Gschweidl (July 1948 – June 49)
- (England) Eric Jones (1949–50)
- (Germany) Albert Sing (1 July 1951 – June 64)
- (Switzerland) Heinz Bigler (April 1964 – July 64)
- (Germany) Hans Merkle (1 July 1964 – 30 June 1968)
- René Häfeli (Jan 1968 – July 68)
- (Germany) Albert Brülls (1968–70)
- (Switzerland) Walter Eich (Jan 1970 – July 70)
- (France) Henri Skiba (July 1970 – November 70)
- (Switzerland) Heinz Schneiter and (Switzerland) Walter Eich (1970–72)
- Otto Peters (1972–73)
- (Germany) Kurt Linder (1 July 1973 – 31 December 1977)
- (Switzerland) René Hüssy (1977–78)
- (Germany) Friedhelm Konietzka (1 July 1978 – 30 June 1980)
- (Netherlands) Lambertus Theunissen (July 1980 – June 83)
- (Germany) Kurt Linder (July 1983 – October 83)
- (Switzerland) Walter Eich (1983–84)
- (Poland) Aleksander Mandziara (1 July 1984 – 30 June 1988)
- (Sweden) Tord Grip (1 July 1988 – June 90)
- (Hungary) Pál Csernai (31 December 1989 – 30 June 1990)
- (Switzerland) Martin Trümpler (1 July 1990 – 30 June 1994)
- (Switzerland) Bernard Challandes (1 July 1994 – 13 March 1995)
- Jean-Marie Conz (1995–97)
- (Sweden) Tord Grip (April 1997 – July 97)
- (Sweden) R. Andersson and (Sweden) T. Sjöberg (1 July 1997 – 30 June 1998)
- Robert Schober and (Bosnia and Herzegovina) Admir Smajić (Jan 1998 – July 98)
- (Switzerland) Claude Ryf (1 July 1998–99)
- (Switzerland) Martin Weber (May 1999 – July 99)
- Roger Läubli (July 1999)
- (Switzerland) Richard Wey and (Bosnia and Herzegovina) Admir Smajić (July 1999)
- (Switzerland) Richard Wey (6 Aug 1999 – 28 September 1999)
- (Switzerland) Marco Schällibaum (1 September 1999 – 30 June 2003)
- (Switzerland) Hans-Peter Zaugg (1 July 2003 – 17 October 2005)
- (Germany) Gernot Rohr (18 October 2005 – 21 September 2006)
- (Italy) Erminio Piserchia (interim) (21 September 2006 – 11 October 2006)
- (Switzerland) Martin Andermatt (12 October 2006 – 30 July 2008)
- (Italy) Erminio Piserchia (interim) (30 July 2008 – 10 August 2008)
- (Switzerland) Vladimir Petković (10 Aug 2008 – 8 May 2011)
- (Italy) Erminio Piserchia (interim) (8 May 2011 – 30 June 2011)
- (Switzerland) Christian Gross (1 July 2011 – 29 April 2012)
- (Italy) Erminio Piserchia (interim) (29 April 2012 – 30 June 2012)
- (Switzerland) Martin Rueda (1 July 2012 – 7 April 2013)
- (Switzerland) Bernard Challandes (8 April 2013 – 30 June 2013)
- (Switzerland) Uli Forte (1 July 2013 – Sept 2015)
- (Austria) Adi Hütter (Sept 2015 – 1 June 2018)
- (Switzerland) Gerardo Seoane (1 July 2018 – 30 June 2021)
- (United States) David Wagner (1 July 2021 – 7 March 2022)
- (Switzerland) Matteo Vanetta (interim) (7 March 2022 – 1 June 2022)
- (Switzerland) Raphaël Wicky (2 June 2022 – 4 March 2024)
- (Switzerland) Joël Magnin (4 March 2024 – 1 June 2024) (interim)
- (Switzerland) Patrick Rahmen (1 June 2024 – 8 October 2024)
- (Switzerland) Joël Magnin (8 October 2024 – 18 December 2024) (interim)
- (Switzerland) Giorgio Contini (18 December 2024 – 31 October 2025)

== Presidents ==
- Max Schwab (1898–99)
- Dr. Edgar Fetscherin (1899–04)
- Dr. Otto Kubli (1904–05)
- Albert Heiniger (1905–06)
- Max Schwab (1906–07)
- D. Chessex (1907–08)
- Edgar Egger (1908–09)
- Walter Messerli (1909–11)
- Dr. Herbert Schmid (1911–15)
- Dr. Herbert Frey (1915–19)
- Albert Hirt (1919–20)
- Hans Greuber (1920–21)
- Heinz Schwab (1921–23)
- Albert Hirt (1923–24)
- Rudolf Roth (1924–26)
- Ermin Flück (1926–28)
- Dr. Otto Grogg (1928–29)
- G. Marchand (1929–34)
- Rudolf Roth (1934–36)
- Dr. Adrian Schorrer (1936–37)
- G. Marchand (1937–39)
- Eduard Studer (1939–42)
- Herrmann Wirth (1942–43)
- Otto Wirz (1943–47)
- Erwin Bähler (1947–48)
- Adolf Rösti (1948–50)
- Felix Neuenschwander (1950–52)
- Guido Wärtli (1952–54)
- Walter Bögli (1954–57)
- Hermann Steinegger (1957–62)
- Dr. Herbert Althaus (1962–67)
- Willy Sigrist (1967–71)
- Ferdinand Schmutz (1971–72)
- Ralph Zloczower (1972–80)
- Rudolf Baer (1980–93)
- Jürg Aeberhard (1993)
- Jacques Chèvre (1993–95)
- Dr. Peter Cerny (1995–96)
- Roland Schönenberger (1996)
- Walter Frei (1996–97)
- Peter Morgenthaler (1997)
- Roland Güngerich (1997–98)
- Peter Siegrist (1998–99)
- Martin Maraggia (1999–2001)
- Heinz Fischer (2001–03)
- Peter Mast (2003–07)
- Thomas Grimm (2007–08)
- Werner Müller (2010–16)
- Hanspeter Kienberger (2016–)
