= Sascha Urweider =

Swiss cyclist

Personal information
- Born: 18 September 1980 (age 46) Meiringen, Switzerland

Cycling career
- Sport: Cycling
- Current team: Retired
- Discipline: Road
- Role: Rider

Professional teams
- 2004: Saeco - Romer's - Wetzikon
- 2005–2006: Phonak

Sascha Urweider (born 18 September 1980 in Meiringen) is a Swiss former cyclist. He rode in the 2005 Giro d'Italia.

== Palmares ==
2003
1st Stage 4 Giro della Valle d'Aosta
9th Gara Milionaria
2004
3rd Giro del Lago Maggiore
3rd Berner Rundfahrt
8th Tour du lac Léman
