= Giorgio Contini =

Swiss footballer and manager (born 1974)

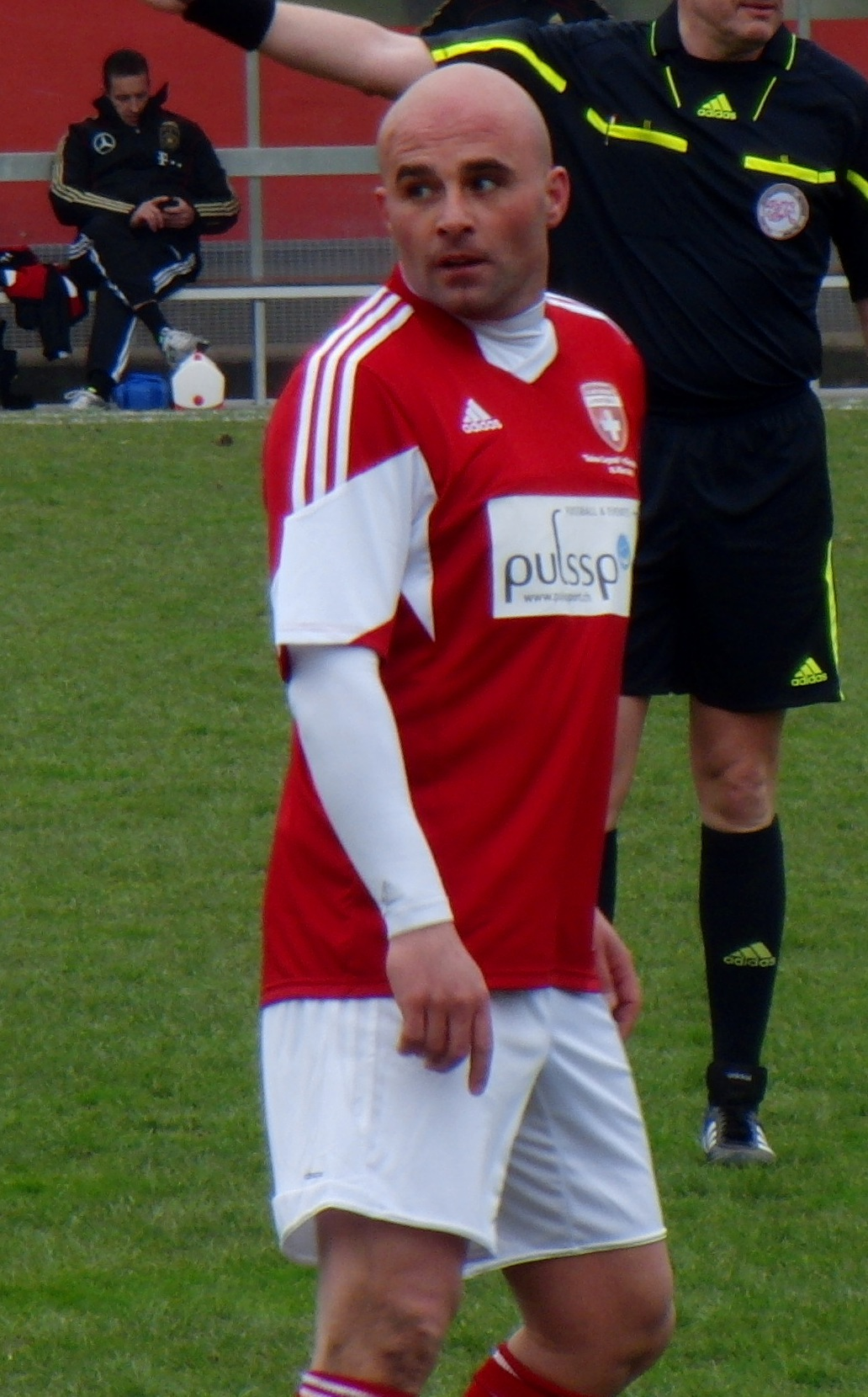

Personal information
- Full name: Giorgio Contini
- Date of birth: 4 January 1974 (age 52)
- Place of birth: Winterthur, Switzerland
- Position: Forward

Youth career
- 1991–1992: YF Juventus Zürich

Senior career*
Years	Team	Apps	(Gls)
1992–1994	FC Winterthur	34	(3)
1994–1995	FC Frauenfeld	30	(23)
1995–1996	FC Baden	36	(18)
1996–2001	FC St. Gallen	144	(25)
2001–2002	FC Luzern	15	(1)
2002–2003	FC Lausanne-Sport	28	(6)
2003–2005	FC Winterthur	72	(19)
Total		359	(95)

International career
2001	Switzerland	1	(0)

Managerial career
- 2005–2006: FC Oberwinterthur
- 2006–2011: FC St. Gallen II
- 2006–2007: FC St. Gallen (assistant)
- 2011: FC St. Gallen
- 2011–2012: FC Luzern (assistant)
- 2012–2017: FC Vaduz
- 2017–2018: FC St. Gallen
- 2018–2021: Lausanne-Sport
- 2021–2023: Grasshopper
- 2024: Switzerland (assistant)
- 2024–2025: Young Boys
- * Club domestic league appearances and goals

Giorgio Contini (born 4 January 1974) is a Swiss football manager and former player who was most recently the head coach of Swiss Super League club Young Boys.

== Playing career ==
=== Teams ===
He played at various clubs in Switzerland, such as FC Winterthur, FC St. Gallen, FC Luzern and FC Lausanne-Sport. His greatest success was the Swiss championship with FC St. Gallen in 1999/2000. In summer 2005, he ended his footballing career.

=== National ===
Contini played his only international match for Switzerland in a friendly match against Poland, on 28 February 2001.

== Coaching career ==
After retiring as soccer player, Contini started his coaching career at FC Oberwinterthur, who played in the 2. Liga Interregional, in 2005. In the following year, he joined FC St. Gallen as coach of the second team. He remained at St. Gallen until 2011. During his time there, he also assisted in coaching the first team, from 2006 until 2007, under Rolf Fringer, and also served as interim coach in 2011. He joined FC Luzern in 2011 as assistant coach, under Murat Yakin.

In late 2012, he was hired by FC Vaduz as head coach, where he remained until June 2017. The following season, he rejoined FC St. Gallen as head coach, this time, for one year. From 2018 until 2021, he was head coach of FC Lausanne-Sport, whom he led to promotion to the Swiss Super League in 2020.

On 9 June 2021, Contini was confirmed as the new head coach of Grasshopper Club Zürich.

On 19 March 2023, Swiss online news site nau.ch reported that Contini had handed in his resignation in mid February, which would see him leaving the club in the summer, following a six month notice period. On the same day, the club confirmed the news and stating their intention of continuing their cooperation for the duration of the season. This news came on the heels of Contini's GC having won two games in a row for the first time that season.

On 15 February 2024, Contini was confirmed as the assistant coach of Switzerland national football team coach Murat Yakin.

On 18 December 2024, he was appointed as the head coach of Swiss champions Young Boys on a two-and-a-half-year contract. On 1 February 2025, he managed his 244th game in the Swiss Super League, making him the sole record holder since the league reform in 2003, ahead of Christian Gross and Alain Geiger. On 31 October 2025, he was sacked from his position as head coach, following a 3–3 draw against his former club Grasshoppers. His termination was preceded by a run of inconsistent results, including a heavy 5–0 loss to FC Lausanne-Sport.

== Honours ==
=== Player ===
FC St. Gallen

- Swiss Super League (1): 1999–2000

=== Manager ===
Vaduz

- Swiss Challenge League (1): 2013–14
- Liechtenstein Cup (4): 2012–13, 2013–14, 2014–15, 2015–16

Lausanne-Sport

- Swiss Challenge League (1): 2019–20

Individual

- Liechtensteiner Coach of the Year (2): 2014, 2016

== Personal life ==
Contini is of Italian descent.
