= Sergio Ghisalberti =

Italian cyclist

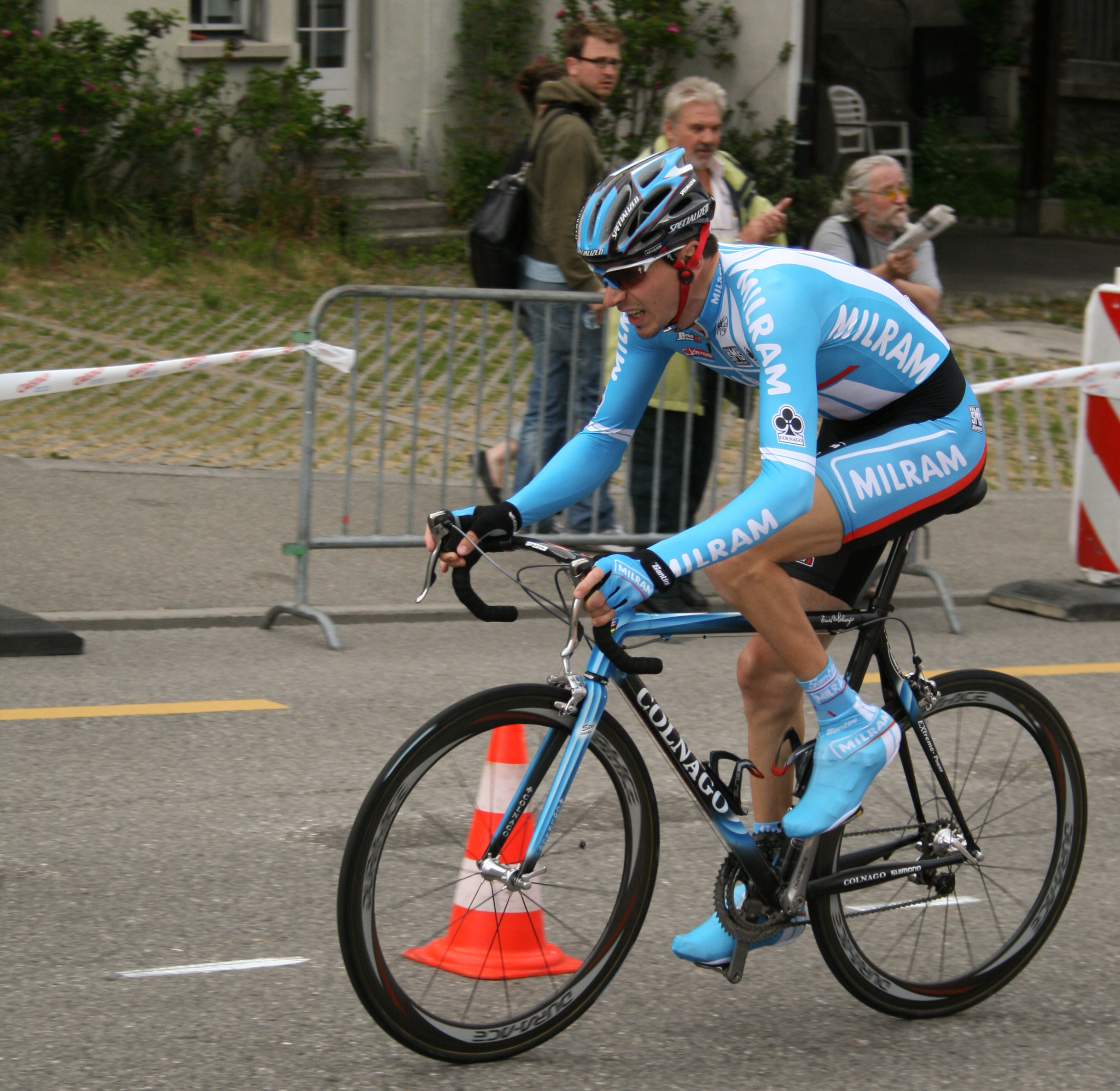
- Sergio Ghisalberti

Personal information
- Full name: Sergio Ghisalberti
- Born: 10 December 1979 (age 46) San Giovanni Bianco, Italy

Cycling career
- Sport: Cycling
- Discipline: Road
- Role: Rider

Professional teams
- 2005: Domina Vacanze
- 2006–2008: Milram

Sergio Ghisalberti (born 10 December 1979 in San Giovanni Bianco) is an Italian professional road bicycle racer.

In 2007, he was one of 9 Italians to sign the Union Cycliste Internationale (UCI) anti-doping charter.

== Palmares ==
- Vuelta a Burgos – Mountains Competition (2006)
- Giro di Lombardia – U23 version (2003)
