= Marco Fertonani =

Italian professional road bicycle racer

Personal information
- Full name: Marco Fertonani
- Born: 8 July 1976 (age 50) Genoa, Italy
- Height: 1.80 m (5 ft 11 in)
- Weight: 66 kg (146 lb)

Cycling career
- Sport: Cycling
- Discipline: Road
- Role: Rider

Professional teams
- 2002–2004: Phonak
- 2005: Domina Vacanze
- 2006–2007: Caisse d'Epargne

Marco Fertonani (born 8 July 1976 in Genoa) is an Italian professional road bicycle racer. In 2007, he tested positive for using testosterone.

== Professional career ==
Fertonani tested positive for using testosterone during the 2007 Tour Méditerranéen and was immediately suspended by the team, although Fertonani has decided to fight the case, citing errors in the testing procedure at the laboratory.

== Major results ==
2004
1st Stage 6 Tour of Qinghai Lake
6th Coppa Placci
2005
5th Overall Tour de Romandie
2006
1st Stage 4 Vuelta a Castilla y León
2007
4th Overall Tour Méditerranéen

== See also ==
- List of doping cases in cycling
- List of doping cases in sport
