= Sonova =

Swiss hearing care company group

Sonova Holding AG

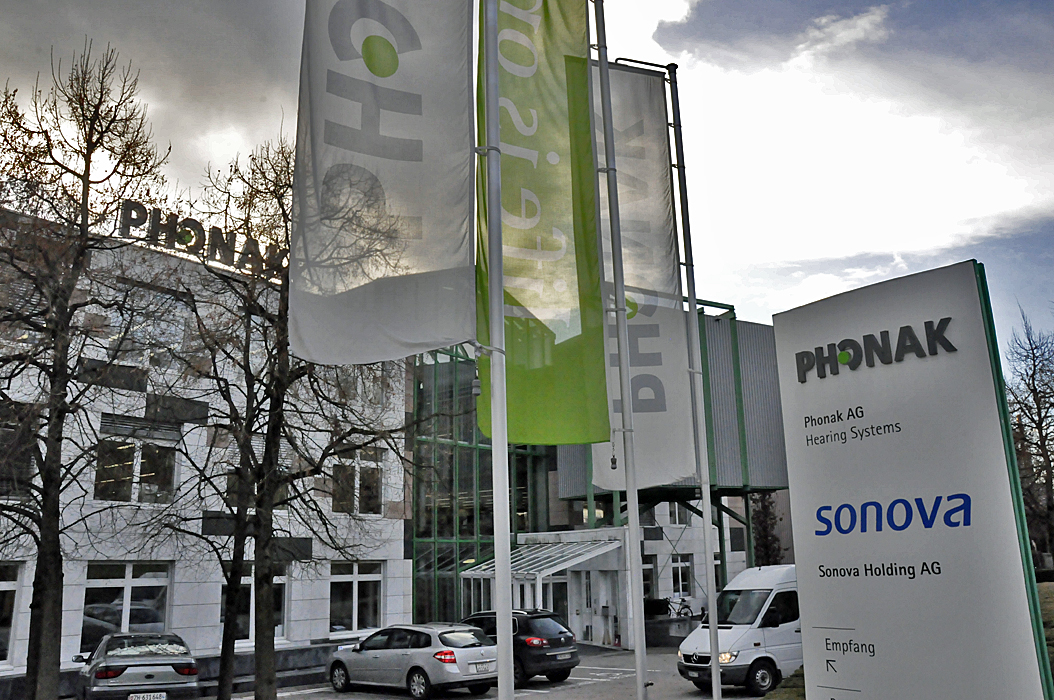
- Sonova headquarters
- Type: Aktiengesellschaft
- Traded as: SIX: SOON
- ISIN: CH1012549785
- Industry: Medical devices
- Predecessor: Phonak AG
- Founded: 1947; 79 years ago (company); 1985 (holding)
- Headquarters: Laubisrütistrasse 28, 8712 Stäfa, canton of Zürich, Switzerland
- Key people: Gilbert Achermann, Chairman; Eric Bernard, CEO
- Products: Hearing instruments
- Brands: Phonak; Unitron; Advanced Bionics; AudioNova Group; Sennheiser (Consumer Division)
- Revenue: CHF 3,627 million (2024)
- Number of employees: 17,990 (2024)
- Website: www.sonova.com

Sonova Holding AG (Phonak Holding AG before 1 August 2007) is an internationally active Swiss group of companies headquartered in Stäfa that specializes in hearing care (hearing instruments, cochlear implants, wireless communication). The Sonova group operates through its core business brands Phonak, Unitron, Advanced Bionics, AudioNova and the consumer product division of Sennheiser. According to market analyses, the group and its brands held an estimated 24% of the global hearing aid market in 2013. Between 11 September 2022 and 2026, Sonova was a component of the Swiss Market Index.

== History ==
The group traces its roots back to the Zürich-based AG für Elektroakustik, which was founded in 1947 with the participation of Ernst Rihs who acquired a majority shareholding in 1965, renaming the company Phonak AG in 1977. His two sons, Hans-Ueli and Andy Rihs, also went on to join the firm, along with Beda Diethelm; after Ernst Rihs' death, the two sons took over his shares while Beda Diethelm became a shareholder with equal rights.

Phonak Holding AG was founded in 1985 as a holding company for the Phonak Group. In 1987 corporate headquarters were moved from Zurich to Stäfa. The company was floated on the SWX Swiss Exchange in 1994 and renamed Sonova Holding AG on 1 August 2007, although this change applied only to the holding company and in parts to the subsidiaries; the product names have remained unaffected.

In November 2009, Sonova announced the takeover of the Advanced Bionics Corporation, a company based in California which specializes in developing and manufacturing cochlear implants. The purchase was successfully completed in January 2010.

In March 2015, Sonova announced the takeover of Hansaton Akustik GmbH, a Hamburg-based, family-run wholesale hearing instrument company. The purchase was successfully completed in April 2015.

In May 2016, Sonova announced an agreement to acquire AudioNova International B.V., one of Europe's largest hearing aid retailers, and successfully completed the acquisition of AudioNova in September 2016. AudioNova operates as part of Sonova's retail network in Europe.

== Company ==
Sonova mainly develops and markets hearing aids, cochlear implants, and Wireless communication devices compatible with their hearing devices.

Sonova operates four business divisions –

- Hearing Instruments
- Audiological Care
- Consumer Hearing
- Cochlear Implants

The group consists of more than 30 constituent companies. Its research facilities are located in Switzerland, Canada, and the US, with manufacturing plants in Switzerland, China and Vietnam. Distribution is handled by its in-house wholesale network and independent sales partners. The group also owns retail outlets in selected countries.

== Brands ==
Sonova operates through its following core business brands:

=== AudioNova ===
AudioNova International B.V (AudioNova) is a Dutch hearing aid retailer operating over 2,500 stores in 10 countries. In May 2016, Sonova purchased AudioNova for €830M from Curacao-based investment company HAL Holding N.V, completing the acquisition in September of that year. In the United States, AudioNova operates over 436 clinics, offering both hearing aids and audiology services.

=== Phonak ===
Phonak manufactures digital hearing aids and integrated wireless communication systems. After the merger of Advanced Bionics into Sonova, Phonak started developing wireless technology for Advanced Bionics cochlear implants; notably the Roger receivers that connect to cochlear implant speech processors. In 2016, Phonak launched their first rechargeable hearing aid device.

=== Unitron ===
Unitron is a hearing aid manufacturer founded in 1964 in Newfoundland, Canada. Today, it operates in more than 70 countries and is headquartered in Kitchener, Ontario, Canada.

=== Advanced Bionics ===
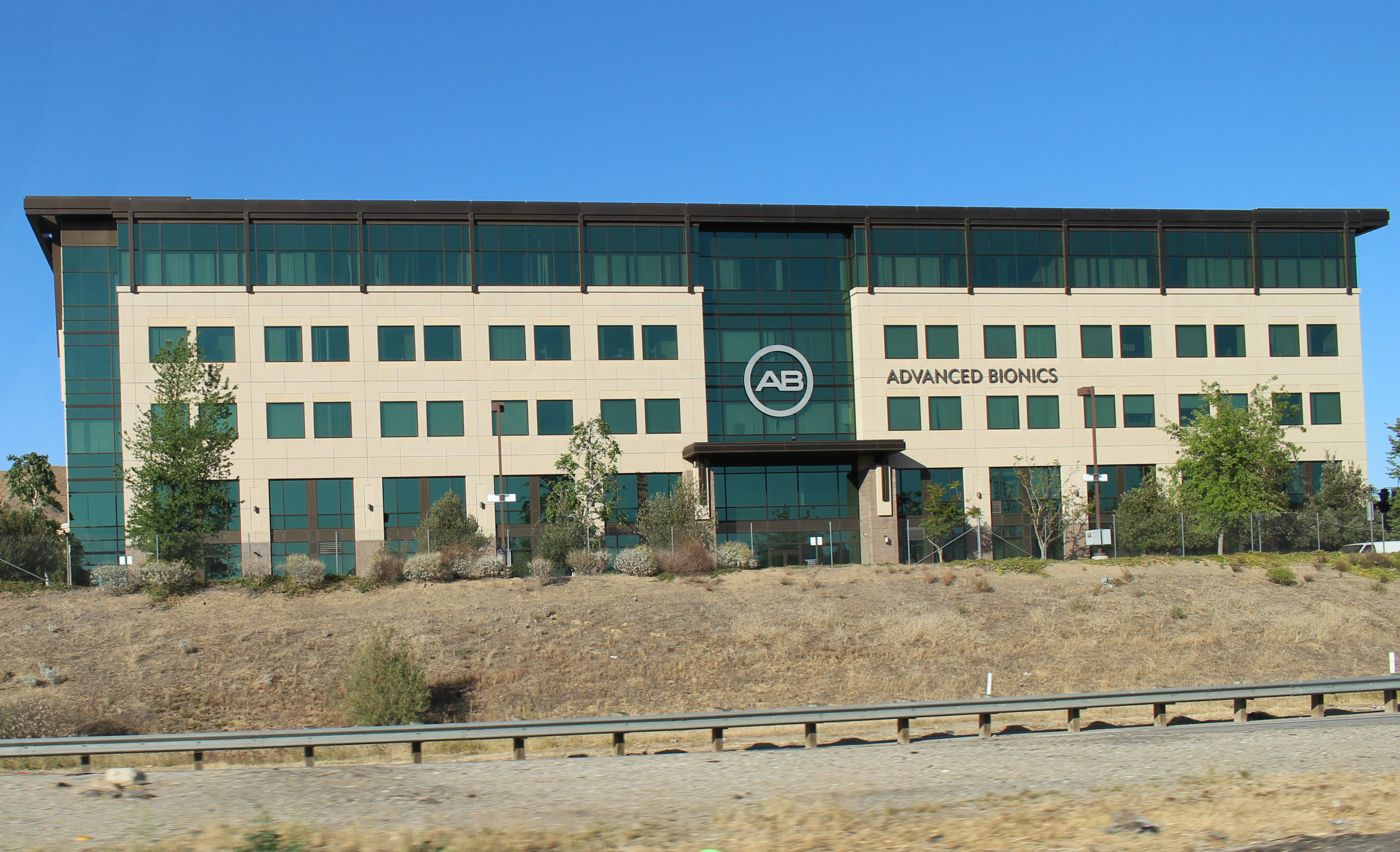
Advanced Bionics headquarters in Valencia, Santa Clarita, California

Advanced Bionics was founded in 1993 and has been a subsidiary of the Sonova group since 2009. Advanced Bionics manufactures cochlear implants for children and adults.

Upon the acquisition by Sonova, Advanced Bionics started integrating Phonak technology into their speech processors, starting with the Naída series. Along with sound processors, the company utilizes Phonak technology for bluetooth streaming, Easycall, and FM systems.

As of 2016, Advanced Bionics' primary competitors were MED-EL and Cochlear Limited in the cochlear implant market, in which those two companies held around 67% of the market; as percent of the market share Advanced Bionics (20%) holds less than Cochlear Limited and more than MED-EL (17%). In 2022 Advanced Bionics lost 5% of the market to Cochlear Limited and Med-EL due to implant recalls.

In 2020, the company introduced the Sky CI M cochlear implant sound processor for children, which utilizes Phonak's Marvel platform and integrated Roger technology.

==== Implant recalls ====
===== 2010 recall and litigation =====
In November 2010, Advanced Bionics recalled a batch of its HiRes 90K implants following reports of malfunctions involving device overstimulation. In Sadler v. Advanced Bionics, the company was found to have been negligent and was forced to pay punitive damages as well as for the medical care needed by the victim of the faulty device, but the company announced it would appeal on the grounds of the punitive damages being too high. Reports regarding technical issues with the HiRes90k had been documented since 2004. Over 4000 devices were recalled, of which 1000 had failed.

===== Ultra 3D quality issue =====
In March 2020, Advanced bionics recalled a batch of its Ultra 3D implants due to poor performance.

=== Sennheiser (Licensed) ===
Sennheiser Consumer Business is a consumer electronics manufacturer specializing in audio. Sennheiser had announced that they are looking to sell their consumer business to a willing buyer to focus on the Professional business. It was announced on 7 May 2021 that Sonova would be acquiring the business for an undisclosed amount. The acquisition had been completed in early 2022. The brand has become part of Sonova's Consumer Hearing department. It is estimated that about 600 employees had been involved in the transition.
