= 2004 UCI Road World Cup =

16th edition of the Cycling World Cup

- Sixteenth edition of the UCI Road World Cup

Details
- Dates: March 20 – October 16
- Location: Europe
- Races: 10

Champions
- Individual champion: Paolo Bettini (ITA) (Quick-Step–Davitamon)
- Teams' champion: T-Mobile Team

The 2004 UCI Road World Cup was the sixteenth and last edition of the UCI Road World Cup. There was no change in the calendar from the 2003 edition, meaning the final seven editions had the same calendar.

Davide Rebellin of Gerolsteiner took a commanding lead in the standings following an excellent Ardennes campaign, winning both the Amstel Gold Race and the Monument Liège–Bastogne–Liège. Paolo Bettini's consistency through the season, however, saw the rider from Quick-Step–Davitamon overhaul Rebellin to claim his third consecutive World Cup crown and the outright record for competition victories. Bettini's excellent form in August had much input into the final standings: three second places in the three races gave Bettini 210 points compared to the 112 points Rebellin accumulated in this time placing Bettini just 6 points behind in second place. On the August weekend without a World Cup race, Bettini won the gold medal in the Olympic Games road race.

In the team competition, T-Mobile Team edged out Rabobank by a single point after Rabobank had led going into the final round.

The season opener at Milan–San Remo is particularly well remembered. In a sprint finish on the Via Roma, Erik Zabel thought he had done enough to secure victory and raised his arms in celebration. As he did, Óscar Freire was able to overtake him at the line and claim an improbable victory.

Bettini won the World Cup without winning a single race, only the second time this happened in World Cup history, after the 1991 edition.

== Races ==
Date	Race	Country	Winner	Team	World Cup Leader	Leader's team	Report
March 20	Milan–San Remo	Italy	Óscar Freire (ESP)	Rabobank	Óscar Freire (ESP)	Rabobank	Report
April 4	Tour of Flanders	Belgium	Steffen Wesemann (GER)	T-Mobile Team	Óscar Freire (ESP)	Rabobank	Report
April 11	Paris–Roubaix	France	Magnus Bäckstedt (SWE)	Alessio–Bianchi	Steffen Wesemann (GER)	T-Mobile Team	Report
April 18	Amstel Gold Race	Netherlands	Davide Rebellin (ITA)	Gerolsteiner	Steffen Wesemann (GER)	T-Mobile Team	Report
April 25	Liège–Bastogne–Liège	Belgium	Davide Rebellin (ITA)	Gerolsteiner	Davide Rebellin (ITA)	Gerolsteiner	Report
August 1	HEW Cyclassics	Germany	Stuart O'Grady (AUS)	Cofidis	Davide Rebellin (ITA)	Gerolsteiner	Report
August 7	Clásica de San Sebastián	Spain	Miguel Ángel Martín Perdiguero (ESP)	Saunier Duval–Prodir	Davide Rebellin (ITA)	Gerolsteiner	Report
August 22	Züri-Metzgete	Switzerland	Juan Antonio Flecha (ESP)	Fassa Bortolo	Davide Rebellin (ITA)	Gerolsteiner	Report
October 10	Paris–Tours	France	Erik Dekker (NED)	Rabobank	Paolo Bettini (ITA)	Quick-Step–Davitamon	Report
October 16	Giro di Lombardia	Italy	Damiano Cunego (ITA)	Saeco	Paolo Bettini (ITA)	Quick-Step–Davitamon	Report

== Single races details ==
worldcupjersey	Denotes the Classification Leader

In the race results the leader jersey identify the rider who wore the jersey in the race (the leader at the start of the race).

In the general classification table the jersey identify the leader after the race.

20 March 2004 — Milan–San Remo 294 km (182.7 mi)

	Rider	Team	Time
1	Óscar Freire (ESP)	Rabobank	7h 11' 23"
2	Erik Zabel (GER)	T-Mobile Team	s.t.
3	Stuart O'Grady (AUS)	Cofidis	s.t.
4	Alessandro Petacchi (ITA)	Fassa Bortolo	s.t.
5	Max van Heeswijk (NED)	U.S. Postal Service	s.t.
6	Igor Astarloa (ESP)	Cofidis	s.t.
7	Romāns Vainšteins (LAT)	Lampre	s.t.
8	Paolo Bettini (ITA)	Quick-Step–Davitamon	s.t.
9	Miguel Ángel Martín Perdiguero (ESP)	Saunier Duval–Prodir	s.t.
10	Peter Van Petegem (BEL)	Lotto–Domo	s.t.

General classification after Milan–San Remo

	Rider	Team	Points
1	Óscar Freire (ESP)	Rabobank	100
2	Erik Zabel (GER)	T-Mobile Team	70
3	Stuart O'Grady (AUS)	Cofidis	50
4	Alessandro Petacchi (ITA)	Fassa Bortolo	40
5	Max van Heeswijk (NED)	U.S. Postal Service	36
6	Igor Astarloa (ESP)	Cofidis	32
7	Romāns Vainšteins (LAT)	Lampre	28
8	Paolo Bettini (ITA)	Quick-Step–Davitamon	24
9	Miguel Ángel Martín Perdiguero (ESP)	Saunier Duval–Prodir	20
10	Peter Van Petegem (BEL)	Lotto–Domo	16

4 April 2004 — Tour of Flanders 257 km (159.7 mi)

	Rider	Team	Time
1	Steffen Wesemann (GER)	T-Mobile Team	6h 39' 00"
2	Leif Hoste (BEL)	Lotto–Domo	s.t.
3	Dave Bruylandts (BEL)	Chocolade Jacques–Wincor Nixdorf	s.t.
4	Léon van Bon (NED)	Lotto–Domo	+ 28"
5	Erik Dekker (NED)	Rabobank	s.t.
6	Andreas Klier (GER)	T-Mobile Team	s.t.
7	Rolf Aldag (GER)	T-Mobile Team	+ 1' 09"
8	Frank Høj (DEN)	Team CSC	+ 1' 16"
9	Paolo Bettini (ITA)	Quick-Step–Davitamon	s.t.
10	George Hincapie (USA)	U.S. Postal Service	s.t.

General classification after Tour of Flanders

	Rider	Team	Points
1	Óscar Freire (ESP)	Rabobank	103
2	Steffen Wesemann (GER)	T-Mobile Team	100
3	Leif Hoste (BEL)	Lotto–Domo	70
4	Erik Zabel (GER)	T-Mobile Team	70
5	Erik Dekker (NED)	Rabobank	51
6	Dave Bruylandts (BEL)	Chocolade Jacques–Wincor Nixdorf	50
7	Stuart O'Grady (AUS)	Cofidis	50
8	Paolo Bettini (ITA)	Quick-Step–Davitamon	44
9	Léon van Bon (NED)	Lotto–Domo	40
10	Alessandro Petacchi (ITA)	Fassa Bortolo	40

11 April 2004 — Paris–Roubaix 258.5 km (160.6 mi)

	Rider	Team	Time
1	Magnus Bäckstedt (SWE)	Alessio–Bianchi	6h 40' 26"
2	Tristan Hoffman (NED)	Team CSC	s.t.
3	Roger Hammond (GBR)	MrBookmaker-Palmans	s.t.
4	Fabian Cancellara (SUI)	Fassa Bortolo	s.t.
5	Johan Museeuw (BEL)	Quick-Step–Davitamon	+ 17"
6	Peter Van Petegem (BEL)	Lotto–Domo	+ 17"
7	Léon van Bon (NED)	Lotto–Domo	+ 29"
8	George Hincapie (USA)	U.S. Postal Service	+ 29"
9	Tom Boonen (BEL)	Quick-Step–Davitamon	+ 29"
10	Frank Høj (DEN)	Team CSC	+ 29"

General classification after Paris–Roubaix

	Rider	Team	Points
1	Steffen Wesemann (GER)	T-Mobile Team	110
2	Óscar Freire (ESP)	Rabobank	103
3	Magnus Bäckstedt (SWE)	Alessio–Bianchi	100
4	Leif Hoste (BEL)	Lotto–Domo	84
5	Tristan Hoffman (NED)	Team CSC	70
6	Erik Zabel (GER)	T-Mobile Team	70
7	Léon van Bon (NED)	Lotto–Domo	68
8	Peter Van Petegem (BEL)	Lotto–Domo	58
9	George Hincapie (USA)	U.S. Postal Service	53
10	Erik Dekker (NED)	Rabobank	51

18 April 2004 — Amstel Gold Race 251.1 km (156.0 mi)

	Rider	Team	Time
1	Davide Rebellin (ITA)	Gerolsteiner	6h 23' 44"
2	Michael Boogerd (NED)	Rabobank	+ 1"
3	Paolo Bettini (ITA)	Quick-Step–Davitamon	+ 18"
4	Danilo Di Luca (ITA)	Saeco	s.t.
5	Peter Van Petegem (BEL)	Lotto–Domo	s.t.
6	Matthias Kessler (GER)	T-Mobile Team	+ 26"
7	Erik Dekker (NED)	Rabobank	+ 41"
~~8~~	Sergei Ivanov (RUS)	T-Mobile Team	+ 52"
9	Mirko Celestino (ITA)	Saeco	+ 53"
10	Giampaolo Caruso (ITA)	Liberty Seguros	+ 55"

General classification after Amstel Gold Race

	Rider	Team	Points
1	Steffen Wesemann (GER)	T-Mobile Team	116
2	Óscar Freire (ESP)	Rabobank	115
3	Davide Rebellin (ITA)	Gerolsteiner	100
4	Magnus Bäckstedt (SWE)	Alessio–Bianchi	100
5	Paolo Bettini (ITA)	Quick-Step–Davitamon	94
6	Peter Van Petegem (BEL)	Lotto–Domo	94
7	Leif Hoste (BEL)	Lotto–Domo	84
8	Erik Zabel (GER)	T-Mobile Team	80
9	Erik Dekker (NED)	Rabobank	79
10	Michael Boogerd (NED)	Rabobank	76

25 April 2004 — Liège–Bastogne–Liège 258.5 km (160.6 mi)

	Rider	Team	Time
1	Davide Rebellin (ITA)	Gerolsteiner	6h 20' 09"
2	Michael Boogerd (NED)	Rabobank	+ 2"
3	Alexander Vinokourov (KAZ)	T-Mobile Team	+ 4"
4	Samuel Sánchez (ESP)	Euskaltel–Euskadi	+ 8"
5	Erik Dekker (NED)	Rabobank	+ 12"
6	Matthias Kessler (GER)	T-Mobile Team	s.t.
7	Michele Scarponi (ITA)	Domina Vacanze	s.t.
8	Ivan Basso (ITA)	Team CSC	s.t.
9	Tyler Hamilton (USA)	Phonak	s.t.
10	Ángel Vicioso (ESP)	Liberty Seguros	s.t.

General classification after Liège–Bastogne–Liège

	Rider	Team	Points
1	Davide Rebellin (ITA)	Gerolsteiner	200
2	Michael Boogerd (NED)	Rabobank	146
3	Steffen Wesemann (GER)	T-Mobile Team	131
4	Óscar Freire (ESP)	Rabobank	127
5	Erik Dekker (NED)	Rabobank	115
6	Magnus Bäckstedt (SWE)	Alessio–Bianchi	100
7	Paolo Bettini (ITA)	Quick-Step–Davitamon	98
8	Peter Van Petegem (BEL)	Lotto–Domo	95
9	Leif Hoste (BEL)	Lotto–Domo	84
10	Erik Zabel (GER)	T-Mobile Team	80

1 August 2004 — HEW Cyclassics 250.3 km (155.5 mi)

	Rider	Team	Time
1	Stuart O'Grady (AUS)	Cofidis	5h 51' 39"
2	Paolo Bettini (ITA)	Quick-Step–Davitamon	s.t.
3	Igor Astarloa (ESP)	Lampre	s.t.
4	Óscar Freire (ESP)	Rabobank	s.t.
5	Gerben Löwik (NED)	Chocolade Jacques–Wincor Nixdorf	s.t.
6	Davide Rebellin (ITA)	Gerolsteiner	s.t.
7	Erik Zabel (GER)	T-Mobile Team	s.t.
8	Fabrizio Guidi (ITA)	Team CSC	s.t.
9	Andrej Hauptman (SLO)	Lampre	s.t.
10	Paolo Bossoni (ITA)	Lampre	s.t.

General classification after HEW Cyclassics

	Rider	Team	Points
1	Davide Rebellin (ITA)	Gerolsteiner	232
2	Paolo Bettini (ITA)	Quick-Step–Davitamon	168
3	Óscar Freire (ESP)	Rabobank	167
4	Stuart O'Grady (AUS)	Cofidis	150
5	Michael Boogerd (NED)	Rabobank	146
6	Steffen Wesemann (GER)	T-Mobile Team	131
7	Erik Dekker (NED)	Rabobank	130
8	Erik Zabel (GER)	T-Mobile Team	108
9	Magnus Bäckstedt (SWE)	Alessio–Bianchi	100
10	Peter Van Petegem (BEL)	Lotto–Domo	95

7 August 2004 — Clásica de San Sebastián 227 km (141.1 mi)

	Rider	Team	Time
1	Miguel Ángel Martín Perdiguero (ESP)	Saunier Duval–Prodir	5h 18' 35"
2	Paolo Bettini (ITA)	Quick-Step–Davitamon	s.t.
3	Davide Rebellin (ITA)	Gerolsteiner	s.t.
4	Marcos-Antonio Serrano (ESP)	Liberty Seguros	s.t.
5	José Alberto Martínez (ESP)	Relax–Bodysol	s.t.
6	Ivan Basso (ITA)	Team CSC	+ 6"
7	Georg Totschnig (AUT)	Gerolsteiner	s.t.
8	Rik Verbrugghe (BEL)	Lotto–Domo	+ 1' 19"
9	Constantino Zaballa (ESP)	Saunier Duval–Prodir	+ 1' 35"
10	Markus Zberg (SUI)	Gerolsteiner	+ 1' 39"

General classification after Clásica de San Sebastián

	Rider	Team	Points
1	Davide Rebellin (ITA)	Gerolsteiner	282
2	Paolo Bettini (ITA)	Quick-Step–Davitamon	238
3	Óscar Freire (ESP)	Rabobank	182
4	Stuart O'Grady (AUS)	Cofidis	150
5	Michael Boogerd (NED)	Rabobank	146
6	Erik Dekker (NED)	Rabobank	137
7	Steffen Wesemann (GER)	T-Mobile Team	131
8	Miguel Ángel Martín Perdiguero (ESP)	Saunier Duval–Prodir	120
9	Erik Zabel (GER)	T-Mobile Team	108
10	Magnus Bäckstedt (SWE)	Alessio–Bianchi	100

22 August 2004 — Züri-Metzgete 241 km (149.8 mi)

	Rider	Team	Time
1	Juan Antonio Flecha (ESP)	Fassa Bortolo	6h 13' 30"
2	Paolo Bettini (ITA)	Quick-Step–Davitamon	s.t.
3	Jérôme Pineau (FRA)	Brioches La Boulangère	s.t.
4	Dimitri Fofonov (KAZ)	Cofidis	s.t.
5	Michael Albasini (SUI)	Phonak	s.t.
6	Davide Rebellin (ITA)	Gerolsteiner	s.t.
~~7~~	~~Michael Barry (CAN)~~	U.S. Postal Service	s.t.
~~8~~	~~George Hincapie (USA)~~	U.S. Postal Service	s.t.
9	Óscar Freire (ESP)	Rabobank	s.t.
10	Massimiliano Gentili (ITA)	Domina Vacanze	s.t.

General classification after Züri-Metzgete

	Rider	Team	Points
1	Davide Rebellin (ITA)	Gerolsteiner	314
2	Paolo Bettini (ITA)	Quick-Step–Davitamon	308
3	Óscar Freire (ESP)	Rabobank	202
5	Michael Boogerd (NED)	Rabobank	146
4	Juan Antonio Flecha (ESP)	Fassa Bortolo	140
6	Erik Dekker (NED)	Rabobank	137
7	Steffen Wesemann (GER)	T-Mobile Team	131
8	Erik Zabel (GER)	T-Mobile Team	108
9	Magnus Bäckstedt (SWE)	Alessio–Bianchi	100
10	Igor Astarloa (ESP)	Lampre	96

10 October 2004 — Paris–Tours 252.5 km (156.9 mi)

	Rider	Team	Time
1	Erik Dekker (NED)	Rabobank	5h 33' 03"
2	Danilo Hondo (GER)	Gerolsteiner	s.t.
3	Óscar Freire (ESP)	Rabobank	s.t.
4	Allan Davis (AUS)	Liberty Seguros	s.t.
5	Stuart O'Grady (AUS)	Cofidis	s.t.
6	Paolo Bettini (ITA)	Quick-Step–Davitamon	s.t.
7	Matthias Kessler (GER)	T-Mobile Team	s.t.
8	Uroš Murn (SLO)	Phonak	s.t.
9	Jaan Kirsipuu (EST)	AG2R Prévoyance	s.t.
10	Eddy Mazzoleni (ITA)	Saeco	s.t.

General classification after Paris–Tours

	Rider	Team	Points
1	Paolo Bettini (ITA)	Quick-Step–Davitamon	340
2	Davide Rebellin (ITA)	Gerolsteiner	327
3	Óscar Freire (ESP)	Rabobank	252
4	Erik Dekker (NED)	Rabobank	237
5	Juan Antonio Flecha (ESP)	Fassa Bortolo	140
6	Steffen Wesemann (GER)	T-Mobile Team	131
7	Erik Zabel (GER)	T-Mobile Team	108
8	Peter Van Petegem (BEL)	Lotto–Domo	105
9	Igor Astarloa (ESP)	Lampre	96
10	Leif Hoste (BEL)	Lotto–Domo	84

16 October 2005 — Giro di Lombardia 246 km (152.9 mi)

	Rider	Team	Time
1	Damiano Cunego (ITA)	Saeco	6h 17' 55"
2	Michael Boogerd (NED)	Rabobank	s.t.
3	Ivan Basso (ITA)	Team CSC	s.t.
4	Cadel Evans (AUS)	T-Mobile Team	s.t.
5	Daniele Nardello (ITA)	T-Mobile Team	+ 2"
6	Marzio Bruseghin (ITA)	Fassa Bortolo	+ 17"
7	Eddy Mazzoleni (ITA)	Saeco	s.t.
8	Dario Frigo (ITA)	Fassa Bortolo	s.t.
9	Franco Pellizotti (ITA)	Alessio–Bianchi	s.t.
10	Luca Mazzanti (ITA)	Ceramica Panaria–Margres	s.t.

General classification after Giro di Lombardia

	Rider	Team	Points
1	Paolo Bettini (ITA)	Quick-Step–Davitamon	340
2	Davide Rebellin (ITA)	Gerolsteiner	327
3	Óscar Freire (ESP)	Rabobank	252
4	Erik Dekker (NED)	Rabobank	251
5	Juan Antonio Flecha (ESP)	Fassa Bortolo	140
6	Steffen Wesemann (GER)	T-Mobile Team	131
7	Peter Van Petegem (BEL)	Lotto–Domo	105
8	Igor Astarloa (ESP)	Lampre	96
9	Mirko Celestino (ITA)	Saeco	72
10	Léon van Bon (NED)	Lotto–Domo	68

== Final standings ==
=== Individual ===
Points are awarded to the top 25 classified riders. Riders must start at least 6 races to be classified.

The points are awarded for every race using the following system:

Position	1st	2nd	3rd	4th	5th	6th	7th	8th	9th	10th	11th	12th	13th	14th	15th	16th	17th	18th	19th	20th	21st	22nd	23rd	24th	25th
Points	100	70	50	40	36	32	28	24	20	16	15	14	13	12	11	10	9	8	7	6	5	4	3	2	1

Pos.	Rider	Team	MSR	ToF	ROU	AGR	LBL	HEW	CSS	ZUR	TOU	LOM	Pts.
1	Paolo Bettini (ITA)	Quick-Step–Davitamon	24	20	DNS	50	4	70	70	70	32	0	340
2	Davide Rebellin (ITA)	Gerolsteiner	0	DNS	DNS	100	100	32	50	32	13	0	327
3	Óscar Freire (ESP)	Rabobank	100	3	DNS	12	12	40	15	20	50	0	252
4	Erik Dekker (NED)	Rabobank	15	36	DNS	28	36	15	7	0	100	14	251
5	Juan Antonio Flecha (ESP)	Fassa Bortolo	DNS	14	13	0	0	0	13	100	0	0	140
6	Steffen Wesemann (GER)	T-Mobile Team	0	100	10	6	15	DNS	DNS	0	0	0	131
7	Peter Van Petegem (BEL)	Lotto–Domo	16	10	32	36	1	0	DNS	DNS	10	DNS	105
8	Igor Astarloa (ESP)	Lampre	32	0	DNS	DNS	DNS	50	14	0	0	0	96
9	Mirko Celestino (ITA)	Saeco	14	0	DNS	20	2	14	8	9	5	0	72
10	Léon van Bon (NED)	Lotto–Domo	0	40	28	0	DNS	0	DNS	DNS	0	0	68
11	Daniele Nardello (ITA)	T-Mobile Team	0	0	11	0	0	DNS	0	0	0	36	47
12	Fabian Cancellara (SUI)	Fassa Bortolo	DNS	0	40	0	DNS	0	0	DNS	0	DNS	40
13	Sergei Ivanov (RUS)	T-Mobile Team	0	9	7	24	DNS	0	0	DNS	DNS	DNS	40
14	Markus Zberg (SUI)	Gerolsteiner	8	DNS	DNS	0	5	0	16	10	0	0	39
15	Philippe Gilbert (BEL)	FDJeux.com	12	DNS	DNS	0	0	13	DNS	0	14	DNS	39
16	Andreas Klier (GER)	T-Mobile Team	5	32	0	DNS	DNS	0	DNS	DNS	0	0	37
17	Michele Scarponi (ITA)	Domina Vacanze	DNS	DNS	DNS	4	28	DNS	0	0	0	0	32
18	Laurent Brochard (FRA)	AG2R Prévoyance	0	13	DNS	1	8	8	0	DNS	DNS	DNS	30
19	Cristian Moreni (ITA)	Alessio–Bianchi	7	0	DNS	0	0	0	12	DNS	11	DNS	30
20	Rolf Aldag (GER)	T-Mobile Team	0	28	0	0	DNS	0	DNS	DNS	0	DNS	28
Race winners not eligible for general classification
Pos.	Rider	Team	MSR	ToF	ROU	AGR	LBL	HEW	CSS	ZUR	TOU	LOM	Pts.
-	Stuart O'Grady (AUS)	Cofidis	50	0	DNS	DNS	DNS	100	DNS	DNS	36	DNS	186
-	Miguel Ángel Martín Perdiguero (ESP)	Saunier Duval–Prodir	20	DNS	DNS	DNS	0	DNS	100	DNS	DNS	DNS	120
	Damiano Cunego (ITA)	Saeco	DNS	DNS	DNS	DNS	DNS	DNS	5	DNS	DNS	100	105
-	Magnus Bäckstedt (SWE)	Alessio–Bianchi	0	0	100	DNS	DNS	0	DNS	DNS	DNS	DNS	100

Key
Colour	Result
Gold	Winner
Silver	2nd place
Bronze	3rd place
Green	Top ten position
Blue	Other points position
Purple	Out of points, retired
Red	Did not start (DNS)

=== Teams ===
Points are awarded to the top 10 teams. Teams must start at least 8 races to be classified. The first 18 teams in world ranking must start in all races. The points are awarded for every race using the following system:

Position	1st	2nd	3rd	4th	5th	6th	7th	8th	9th	10th
Points	12	9	8	7	6	5	4	3	2	1

Pos.	Team	MSR	ToF	ROU	AGR	LBL	HEW	CSS	ZUR	TOU	LOM	Pts.
1	T-Mobile Team	8	12	7	8	12	4	0	1	5	12	69
2	Rabobank	5	8	0	12	9	8	2	3	12	9	68
3	Gerolsteiner	4	0	0	0	7	6	12	12	6	0	47
4	Fassa Bortolo	9	6	3	0	0	9	0	9	4	7	47
5	Lotto–Domo	0	9	12	5	0	0	5	5	9	0	45
