= Carlo Santuccione =

Italian sports doctor

Carlo Santuccione (23 October 1947 – 4 March 2017) was an Italian sports doctor who was also known as Ali the Chemist. Santuccione worked with Francesco Conconi at the University of Ferrara in Italy at the Centro Studi Biomedici Applicati allo Sport or Biomedical Research Institute.

== History ==
Santuccione was born in Cepagatti.

During the 1990s, Santuccione worked with Conconi, the man who is said to have introduced Erythropoietin or EPO to the sport of cycling.

Santuccione was suspended from acting as a physician from 1995 to 2000 by the Italian National Olympic Committee. Santuccione's name appeared in the case against Francesco Conconi, and he was subject to additional investigation in 2001. In 2004, the large-scale operation Oil for Drugs began in 29 Italian provinces against a doping network that Santuccione was suspected of having headed. Doping products such as Testosterone anabolic steroids, EPO, Aranesp (Darbepoetin alfa) and blood transfusion equipment (Blood doping) were found, and investigations were opened against 138 athletes (15 of whom were professional cyclists). On 18 December 2007, Santuccione was given a lifetime ban by the Italian National Olympic Committee due to his involvement in the Oil for Drugs case and after having already serving a lengthy ban for a previous doping offense. Riccardo Riccò, who finished second in the 2008 Giro d'Italia and tested positive for a form of third-generation EPO during the 2008 Tour de France, named Santuccione as his supplier of the drug.

He died in Pescara in 2017.

== List of racers ==
- Alessio Galletti
- Mario Scirea
- Fabio Sacchi
- Eddy Mazzoleni
- Danilo Di Luca
- Alessandro Spezialetti
- Ruggero Marzoli
- Giuseppe Muraglia
- Simone Masciarelli
- Riccardo Riccò
