= Oil for Drugs =

The Oil for Drugs case is an Italian doping case against doctor Carlo Santuccione and a number of accomplices, started in 2003. He is accused of administering prohibited doping products to professional and amateur athletes, to enhance their performance as well as being involved in doping network across Italy.

== Timeline ==
=== Death of amateur cyclist ===
The catalyst to start the investigation was the death of an amateur cyclist in Italy that was suspicious. The death of this unnamed cyclist, which occurred around December 2002, led to an investigation by the Italian authorities. The State Prosecutor started and coordinated the investigation.

=== Police action ===
Italy's Anti-Narcotic Group (NAS) began an investigation, this included tapping the phones of Doctor Santuccione and installing a hidden camera in his office. On March 3, 2004, they recorded a phone call in which Santuccione advised the professional cyclist Danilo Di Luca to inject EPO before Milan–San Remo. Di Luca said that he would visit the Doctor that evening with teammate Alessandro Spezialetti. Later that evening the video surveillance of Santuccione's office showed Santuccione preparing two disposable syringes with EPO and exiting his office to where Di Luca and Spezialetti were waiting outside. A teammate of Di Luca and Spezialetti, Eddy Mazzoleni also sent SMS messages to Santuccione at this time mentioning Di Luca and hormone use.

Following this surveillance the NAS squad conducted coordinated surprise raids at team hotels as well as at certain riders' homes on the night of May 24, 2004. Eight riders (all clients of Santuccione) from six different teams were involved. These were:

- Alessio Galletti and Mario Scirea from Domina Vacanze
- Fabio Sacchi from Fassa Bortolo
- Eddy Mazzoleni, Danilo Di Luca and Alessandro Spezialetti from Saeco
- Ruggero Marzoli from Acqua & Sapone
- Giuseppe Muraglia from Formaggi Pinzolo Fiava
- Simone Masciarelli from Vini Caldirola–Nobili Rubinetterie

No illegal substances were found.

The NAS raid was part of a much larger raid carried out in 28 Italian cities involving 138 professional and amateur athletes, doctors and others who were under suspicion of dealing or using doping in several sports. However, by May 2004, only two arrests had been made. One of these involved a pharmacist.

=== Suspensions and bans ===
Danilo Di Luca was given a three-month suspension due to his involvement in the case. On December 18, 2007, Doctor Santuccione was given a lifetime ban by the Italian National Olympic Committee (CONI) due to his involvement in the Oil for Drugs case and after having already serving a lengthy ban for a previous doping offense. On October 26, 2007, the Italian pole vaulter Giuseppe Gibilisco was given a two-year ban for his involvement. On April 8, 2008, Mazzoleni was given a two-year suspension due to his involvement in the case.
