= 2004 Clásica de San Sebastián =

Race details
- Dates: 7 August 2004
- Stages: 1
- Distance: 227 km (141.1 mi)
- Winning time: 5h 18' 35"

Results
	Winner	Miguel Ángel Martín Perdiguero (ESP)	(Saunier Duval–Prodir)
	Second	Paolo Bettini (ITA)	(Quick-Step–Davitamon)
	Third	Davide Rebellin (ITA)	(Gerolsteiner)

The 2004 Clásica de San Sebastián was the 24th edition of the Clásica de San Sebastián cycle race and was held on 7 August 2004. The race started and finished in San Sebastián. The race was won by Miguel Ángel Martín Perdiguero of the Saunier Duval team.

== General classification ==
Final general classification

Rank	Rider	Team	Time
1	Miguel Ángel Martín Perdiguero (ESP)	Saunier Duval–Prodir	5h 18' 35"
2	Paolo Bettini (ITA)	Quick-Step–Davitamon	+ 0"
3	Davide Rebellin (ITA)	Gerolsteiner	+ 0"
4	Marcos-Antonio Serrano (ESP)	Liberty Seguros	+ 0"
5	José Alberto Martínez (ESP)	Relax–Bodysol	+ 0"
6	Ivan Basso (ITA)	Team CSC	+ 6"
7	Georg Totschnig (AUT)	Gerolsteiner	+ 6"
8	Rik Verbrugghe (BEL)	Lotto–Domo	+ 1' 19"
9	Constantino Zaballa (ESP)	Saunier Duval–Prodir	+ 1' 35"
10	Markus Zberg (SUI)	Gerolsteiner	+ 1' 39"
