= Igor Astarloa =

Spanish cyclist

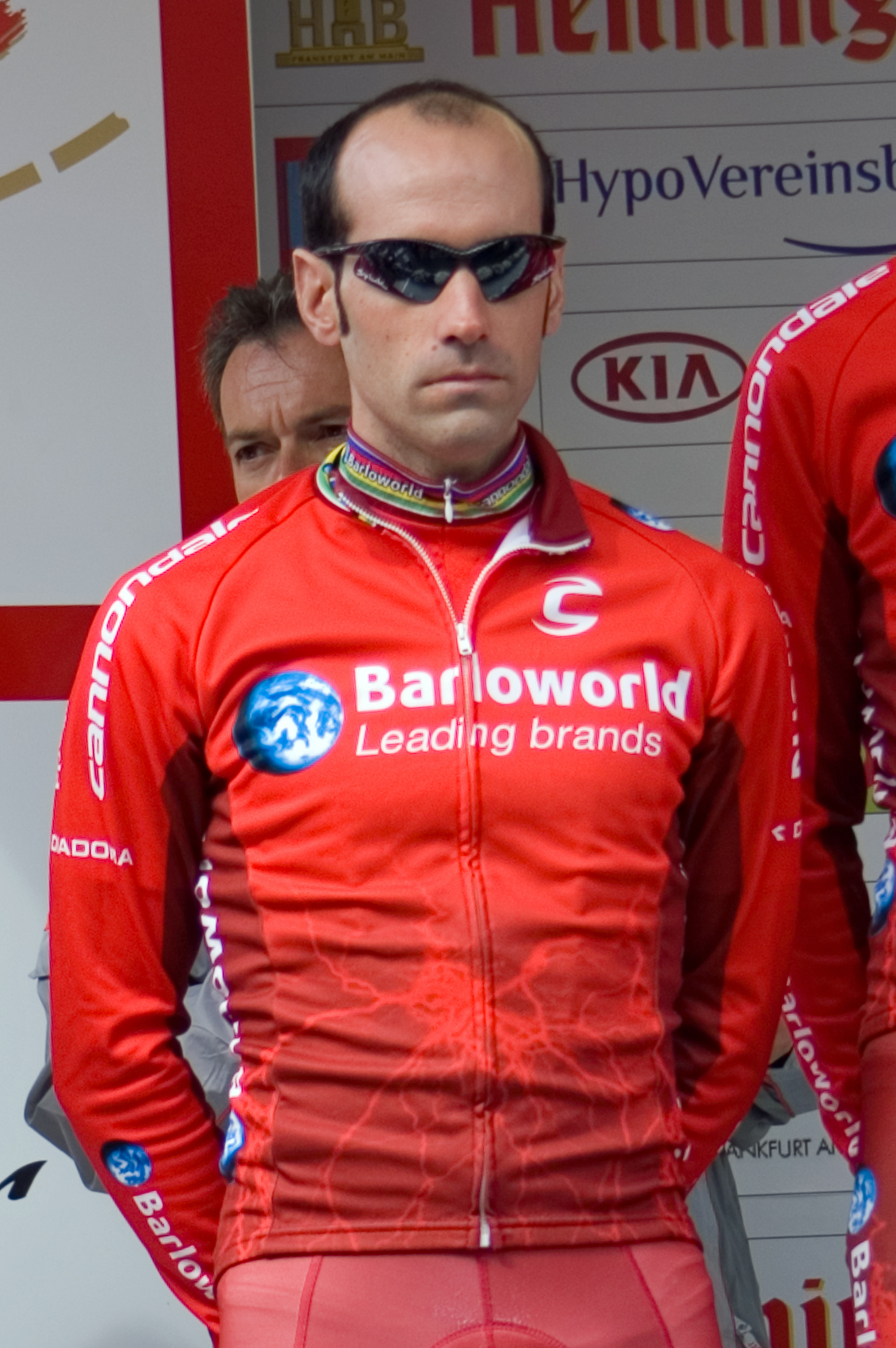
- Astarloa at the 2006 Rund um den Henninger Turm

Personal information
- Full name: Igor Astarloa Askasibar
- Born: March 29, 1976 (age 50) Ermua, Spain
- Height: 1.70 m (5 ft 7 in)
- Weight: 67 kg (148 lb)

Cycling career
- Sport: Cycling
- Discipline: Road
- Role: Rider (retired)
- Rider type: Classics specialist

Professional teams
- 2000–2001: Mercatone Uno–Albacom
- 2002–2003: Saeco–Longoni Sport
- 2004: Cofidis (until April)
- 2004: Lampre (from May)
- 2005–2006: Barloworld
- 2007–2008: Team Milram
- 2009: Amica Chips-Knauf

Major wins
- One-day races and Classics World Road Race Championships (2003) La Flèche Wallonne (2003) Milano–Torino (2006)
Medal record
Representing Spain
Men's road bicycle racing
World Championships
Gold medal – first place	2003 Hamilton	Elite Men's Road Race

Igor Astarloa Askasibar (born March 29, 1976) is a retired cyclist from Spain.

== Career ==
Astarloa turned professional with the Italian cycling team Mercatone Uno and enjoyed his best season in 2003 with team Saeco when he won the Flèche Wallonne and the road race title at the World Cycling Championships at Hamilton, Canada. The following year, he joined Cofidis, but when the team temporarily stopped racing due to a doping scandal, he was released to join Lampre. During the 2006 transfer season it was announced that he was to leave Team Barloworld, the Continental Circuit team for which Astarloa had ridden for the last several years, and join Team Milram, a member of the UCI ProTour.

Team Milram terminated its contract with Astarloa in May 2008 following disclosures that he had shown "irregular blood values", as reported by Focus magazine. He joined the Amica Chips-Knauf team, which folded in May 2009. Soon after, in June 2009, Astarloa was one of the first five riders to fall foul of the Union Cycliste International's new biological passport system, introduced to combat doping by competitive cyclists. Astarloa was unable to secure another contract that season, and retired in January 2010.

== Doping conviction ==
On 1 December 2010, the Union Cycliste International announced that the Spanish Cycling Federation’s Disciplinary Commission had handed down a two-year suspension and a €35,000 fine to Igor Astarloa. According to Cyclingnews.com, Astarloa's blood samples had come under considerable scrutiny prior to the events of 2008-09 and in the wake of his 2003 world championships victory, although he was never punished for any infraction.

== Major results ==
1999
4th Gran Premio della Liberazione
2000
9th Road race, National Road Championships
9th Gran Premio della Costa Etruschi
2001
1st GP Primavera
5th GP Miguel Induráin
6th Clásica de Almería
7th HEW Cyclassics
2002
1st Overall Brixia Tour

1st Stage 2a

2nd Clásica de San Sebastián
2nd HEW Cyclassics
2nd Japan Cup
7th Paris–Tours
2003
1st Road race, UCI Road World Championships
1st La Flèche Wallonne
1st Stage 3 Volta a la Comunitat Valenciana
3rd Rund um den Henninger Turm
4th HEW Cyclassics
10th Amstel Gold Race
2004
2nd GP Industria & Artigianato di Larciano
3rd HEW Cyclassics
4th Overall Tirreno–Adriatico
6th Milan–San Remo
9th Overall Brixia Tour

1st Points classification
1st Stage 1

2005
Vuelta a Burgos

1st Points classification
1st Stage 2

4th Overall Brixia Tour
5th Paris–Brussels
6th Coppa Placci
7th Gran Premio de Llodio
10th Clásica de San Sebastián
2006
1st Milano–Torino
6th Overall Critérium International
8th Gran Premio di Chiasso

=== Grand Tour general classification results timeline ===
Grand Tour	2001	2002	2003	2004	2005	2006	2007	2008
Giro d'Italia	—	53	—	55	—	—	—	DNF
Tour de France	Has not contested during his career							
Vuelta a España	DNF	63	DNF	DNF	—	—	—	—

Legend
—	Did not compete
DNF	Did not finish

== See also ==
- List of doping cases in cycling
