= Saunier Duval–Prodir =

Spanish cycling team

Geox-TMC

Team information
- UCI code: GEO
- Registered: Spain
- Founded: 2004
- Disbanded: 2011
- Discipline: Road
- Status: UCI Professional Continental
- Bicycles: Fuji

Key personnel
- General manager: Mauro Gianetti

Team name history
- 2004–2007 2008 2008 2009 2010 2011: Saunier Duval–Prodir; Saunier Duval–Scott; Scott–American Beef; Fuji–Servetto; Footon–Servetto–Fuji; Geox-TMC

Geox-TMC was a Spanish-based road bicycle racing team, registered for 2011 as a UCI Professional Continental team. Established as Saunier Duval–Prodir in 2004, the team has had success in one-day races such as Clásica de San Sebastián.

The team's final title sponsors were Geox, an Italian shoe company, and TMC, a multinational company that develops electric transformers with cast resin windings.

== History ==
Mauro Gianetti, current Team Principal and CEO of UAE Team Emirates XRG, and Joxean Fernández Matxín, current Team Manager of UAE Team Emirates XRG founded the team in 2004. Gianetti managed the team throughout its existence, whereas Matxín was directeur sportif of Saunier Duval between 2004-2008, and Saunier Duval amateurs 1998-2000. Following the team's implication in doping in the 2008 Tour de France, Gianetti denied any knowledge of doping in the team. Both Gianetti and Matxín have enjoyed continued professional success on the UCI World Tour with UAE Team Emirates XRG, most notably with "generational talent" Tadej Pogačar.

After team cyclist Riccardo Riccò was arrested by police following a positive test for doping after the 4th stage of the 2008 Tour de France, the team left the 2008 Tour de France before the 12th stage of the race began. Both Riccò and Leonardo Piepoli were fired from the team, but the team was still denied a place in the 2008 Vuelta a España and other UCI ProTour races. The team's sponsors withdrew their support, but new sponsors were found to retain the team's participation at the top level of the sport. The team continued through the 2009 and 2010 season sponsored by Fuji–Servetto and then later as Footon–Servetto–Fuji.

For 2011 the team secured new sponsors Geox and TMC. They entered the 2011 season as a pro continental team after failing to secure a World Tour Licence. They received a wild card invite to the Vuelta a España which they won with Juan José Cobo, although this result has been reversed by the UCI due to violation of anti-doping rules. On October 20 it was announced that Geox were withdrawing their sponsorship. It was later announced by the UCI that riders were free to move to other teams. On December 7, it was announced that management had failed to find a new sponsor, and would now turn their focus to helping riders find new teams, indicating that the team would not continue.

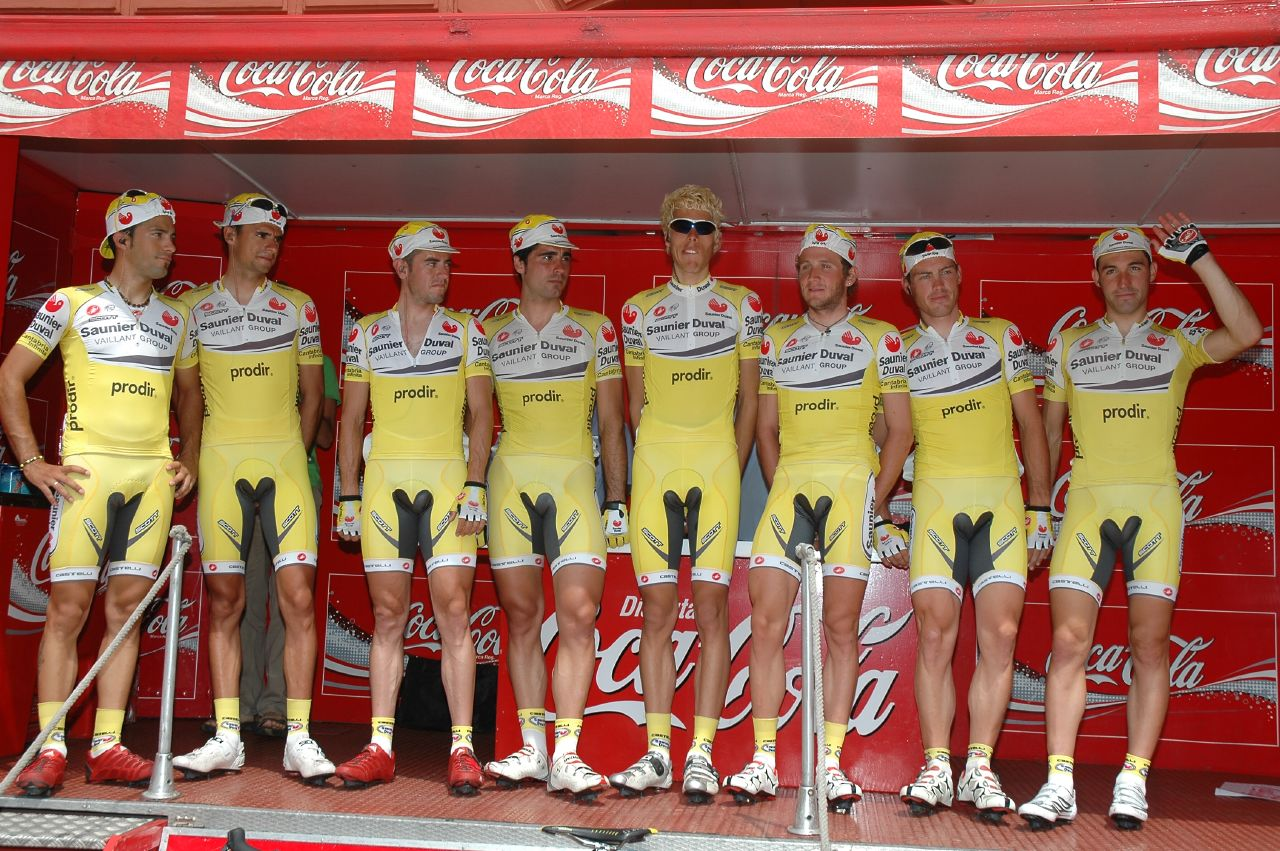
The team in 2007

== Major wins ==
=== 2004 ===
Stage 1 Tour of Qatar, Francisco Ventoso
Overall Vuelta a Andalucía, Juan Carlos Domínguez

Stage 3, Juan Carlos Domínguez

Overall Setmana Catalana de Ciclisme, Joaquim Rodríguez
Stage 3 Vuelta a Aragón, Constantino Zaballa
Stage 4 Tour de Romandie, Fabian Jeker
Stage 5 Vuelta a Asturias, Miguel Ángel Martín Perdiguero
Stages 1 & 2 Euskal Bizikleta, Miguel Ángel Martín Perdiguero
Wachovia USPRO Championships, Francisco Ventoso
Overall Volta a Catalunya, Miguel Ángel Martín Perdiguero

Stages 2, 3 & 4, Miguel Ángel Martín Perdiguero

Clásica San Sebastián, Miguel Ángel Martín Perdiguero
Subida a Urkiola, Leonardo Piepoli
Stage 9 Vuelta a España, Leonardo Piepoli
Stage 19 Vuelta a España, Constantino Zaballa

=== 2005 ===
Stage 4 Volta a Catalunya, Leonardo Piepoli
Stage 5 Volta a Catalunya, Íñigo Cuesta
Stage 6 Tour de Suisse, Chris Horner
Italy Time Trial Championships, Marco Pinotti
Spain Road Race Championships, Juan Manuel Gárate
Overall Vuelta a Burgos, Juan Carlos Domínguez

Stage 4, Juan Carlos Domínguez

Clásica de San Sebastián, Constantino Zaballa
Subida a Urkiola, Joaquim Rodríguez
Mountains classification in the Vuelta a España, Joaquim Rodríguez

=== 2006 ===
Stage 5 Settimana Internazionale di Coppi e Bartali, Riccardo Riccò
Overall Vuelta al Pais Vasco, José Ángel Gómez Marchante

Stage 6, José Ángel Gómez Marchante

Overall Volta a Catalunya, David Cañada
Stages 13 & 17 Giro d'Italia, Leonardo Piepoli
Overall Euskal Bizikleta, Koldo Gil

Stages 1 & 4b, Koldo Gil
Stage 4a, Francisco Ventoso

Stage 6 Tour de Suisse, Koldo Gil
Poland Time Trial Championship, Piotr Mazur
Stage 3 Vuelta a España, Francisco Ventoso
Stage 14 Vuelta a España, David Millar
Japan Cup, Riccardo Riccò

=== 2007 ===
Stage 4 Tour de San Luis, Riccardo Riccò
Prologue Paris–Nice, David Millar
Stages 3 & 4 Tirreno–Adriatico, Riccardo Riccò
Stages 2, 3 & 5 Vuelta a Castilla y León, Francisco Ventoso
Stage 5 Settimana Internazionale di Coppi e Bartali, Riccardo Riccò
Overall Vuelta al País Vasco, Juan José Cobo

Stages 1 & 5, Juan José Cobo

Subida al Naranco, Koldo Gil
Overall Vuelta a Asturias, Koldo Gil

Stage 3, Alberto Fernández de la Puebla

Stage 10 Giro d'Italia, Leonardo Piepoli
Stage 15 Giro d'Italia, Riccardo Riccò
Stage 17 Giro d'Italia, Gilberto Simoni
Stage 19 Giro d'Italia, Iban Mayo
Mountains classification Giro d'Italia, Leonardo Piepoli
GP Llodio, David de la Fuente
Stage 1 Euskal Bizikleta, Alberto Fernández de la Puebla
Latvia Time Trial Championships, Raivis Belohvoščiks
United Kingdom Road Race Championships, David Millar
United Kingdom Time Trial Championships, David Millar
Subida a Urkiola, José Ángel Gómez Marchante
Stage 5 Eneco Tour, Luciano Pagliarini
Stage 9 Vuelta a España, Leonardo Piepoli
Stage 4 Tour of Missouri, Luciano Pagliarini
Stage 1 Vuelta a Chihuahua, Javier Mejías
Japan Cup, Manuele Mori

=== 2008 ===
Stage 5 Vuelta a Andalucía, Denis Flahaut
Stage 6 Tour of California, Luciano Pagliarini
Stages 2 & 8 Giro d'Italia, Riccardo Riccò
Overall Euskal Bizikleta, Eros Capecchi

Stage 3, Eros Capecchi

Latvia Time Trial Championships, Raivis Belohvoščiks
Stage 10 Tour de France, Juan José Cobo
Stage 5 Vuelta a Burgos, Juan José Cobo
Stage 9 Volta a Portugal, Juan José Cobo
Stage 7 Eneco Tour, Raivis Belohvoščiks
Stage 2 Deutschland Tour, David de la Fuente
Stages 4 & 5 Vuelta Mexico, José Alberto Benítez
Stage 4 Vuelta a Chihuahua, Iker Camaño
Young rider classification in the Giro d'Italia, Riccardo Riccò

- Tour de France:

Stage 6: Riccardo Riccò
Stage 9: Riccardo Riccò
Stage 10: Leonardo Piepoli

Tested Positive For MIRCERA – Stripped of stage wins

=== 2009 ===
Stage 4 Vuelta a Castilla y León, Juan José Cobo
GP Miguel Induráin, David de la Fuente
Stage 1 Tour de Romandie, Ricardo Serrano

=== 2010 ===
Stage 2 Tour de San Luis, Rafael Valls
Stage 3 Tour Down Under, Manuel Cardoso
Overall Circuit de Lorraine, Fabio Felline

Stages 2 & 3, Fabio Felline

=== 2011 ===
Clásica de Almería, Matteo Pelucchi
Stage 3 Giro del Trentino, Fabio Duarte
Stage 2a Brixia Tour, Fabio Felline

== National champions ==
2005
Time Trial Championships, Marco Pinotti
Road Race Championships, Juan Manuel Gárate
2006
Time Trial Championship, Piotr Mazur
2007
Time Trial Championships, Raivis Belohvoščiks
Road Race Championships, David Millar
Time Trial Championships, David Millar
2008
Time Trial Championships, Raivis Belohvoščiks

== Supplementary statistics ==
Grand Tours by highest finishing position
Race	2004	2005	2006	2007	2008	2009	2010	2011
Giro d'Italia	16	5	3	4	2	38	22	7
Tour de France	–	23	40	19	–	–	52	–
Vuelta a España	27	29	5	34	–	10	74	4
Monument races by highest finishing position
Race	2004	2005	2006	2007	2008	2009	2010	2011
Milan–San Remo	9	10	54	18	27	36	–	68
Tour of Flanders	–	30	–	11	66	57	–	–
Paris–Roubaix	–	42	76	54	64	–	–	–
Liège–Bastogne–Liège	36	25	22	8	15	–	–	–
Giro di Lombardia	11	60	28	2	25	9	–	22

== See also ==
- List of teams and cyclists in the 2008 Tour de France
- 2008 Tour de France
- Tour de France
