= 2000 Tour du Haut Var =

Race details
- Dates: 19 February 2000
- Stages: 1
- Distance: 180 km (111.8 mi)
- Winning time: 5h 13' 10"

Results
	Winner	Daniele Nardello (ITA)
	Second	Andrey Kivilev (KAZ)
	Third	Davide Rebellin (ITA)

The 2000 Tour du Haut Var was the 32nd edition of the Tour du Haut Var cycle race and was held on 19 February 2000. The race started and finished in Draguignan. The race was won by Daniele Nardello.

== General classification ==
Final general classification

Rank	Rider	Time
1	Daniele Nardello (ITA)	5h 13' 10"
2	Andrey Kivilev (KAZ)	+ 2"
3	Davide Rebellin (ITA)	+ 57"
4	Francisco Cabello (ESP)	+ 57"
5	Axel Merckx (BEL)	+ 57"
6	Bo Hamburger (DEN)	+ 57"
7	Tadej Valjavec (SLO)	+ 1' 02"
8	Emmanuel Magnien (FRA)	+ 1' 22"
9	Tristan Hoffman (NED)	+ 1' 22"
10	Frédéric Bessy (FRA)	+ 1' 22"
