= Davide Rebellin =

Italian road bicycle racer

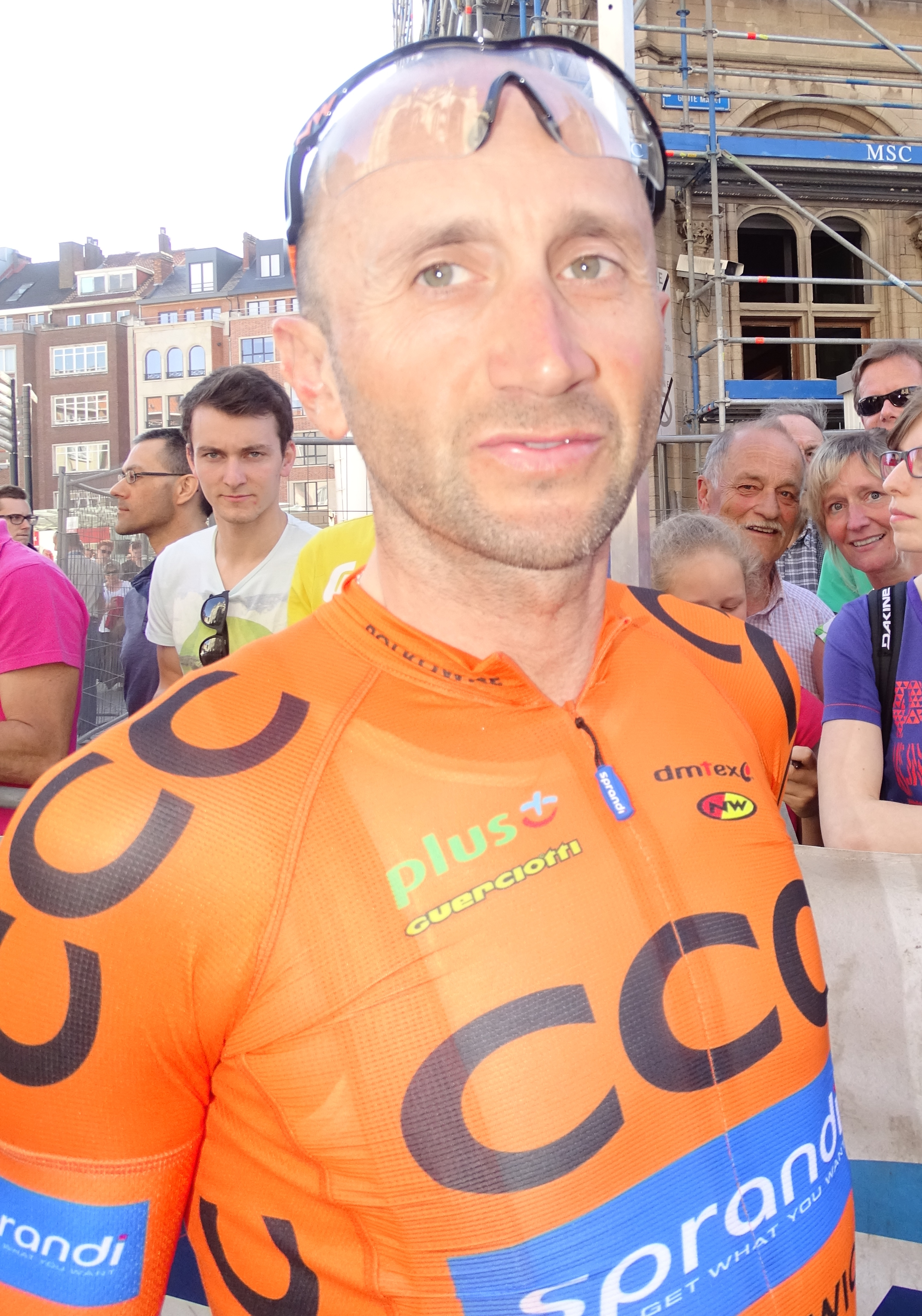
- Rebellin at the 2015 Brabantse Pijl

Personal information
- Full name: Davide Rebellin
- Nickname: Tintin
- Born: 9 August 1971 San Bonifacio, Italy
- Died: 30 November 2022 (aged 51) Montebello Vicentino, Italy
- Height: 1.71 m (5 ft 7 1/2 in)
- Weight: 63 kg (139 lb; 9 st 13 lb)

Cycling career
- Sport: Cycling
- Discipline: Road
- Role: Rider
- Rider type: Classics specialist

Professional teams
- 1992–1995: GB–MG Maglificio
- 1996: Team Polti
- 1997: Française des Jeux
- 1998–1999: Team Polti
- 2000–2001: Liquigas–Pata
- 2002–2008: Gerolsteiner
- 2009: Diquigiovanni–Androni
- 2011: Miche–Guerciotti
- 2012: Meridiana–Kamen
- 2013–2016: CCC–Polsat–Polkowice
- 2017: Kuwait–Cartucho.es
- 2018–2019: Sovac–Natura4Ever
- 2019–2020: Meridiana–Kamen
- 2021–2022: Work Service–Marchiol–Vega

Major wins
- Grand Tours Giro d'Italia 1 individual stage (1996) Stage races Tirreno–Adriatico (2001) Paris–Nice (2008) One-day races and Classics Liège–Bastogne–Liège (2004) Grand Prix de Suisse (1997) Clásica de San Sebastián (1997) Amstel Gold Race (2004) La Flèche Wallonne (2004, 2007, 2009) Tre Valli Varesine (1998, 2011) Rund um den Henninger Turm (2003) Giro dell'Emilia (2006, 2014)
Medal record
Representing Italy
Men's road bicycle racing
World Championships
Silver medal – second place	1991 Stuttgart	Amateur road race

Davide Rebellin (9 August 1971 – 30 November 2022) was an Italian professional road bicycle racer, who rode professionally between 1992 and 2022 for twelve different teams, taking more than sixty professional wins. He was considered one of the finest classics specialists of his generation with more than fifty top ten finishes in UCI Road World Cup and UCI ProTour classics.

Rebellin was best known in the cycling world for his 2004 season, when he won a then unprecedented treble with wins in Amstel Gold Race, La Flèche Wallonne and Liège–Bastogne–Liège. He also won stage races such as Paris–Nice and Tirreno–Adriatico, and a stage in the Giro d'Italia. Rebellin served a two-year suspension for testing positive for Mircera at the 2008 Summer Olympics.

== Career ==
=== 1990s ===
Born in San Bonifacio in the province of Verona, Rebellin turned professional in 1992 and came to the attention of the cycling world with a string of strong performances during his early years. He suffered from asthma, a disease that affected his whole career. In 1996 he gained further notice when he thrived in the 1996 Giro d'Italia. Riding for Team Polti, Rebellin took stage seven and with it led in the general classification, giving him the pink jersey. He held the lead for six stages and finished the Grand Tour sixth overall. Years later he said of the race, "I have won Classics, but the first important win was in the 1996 Giro, winning the maglia rosa with the stage."

In 1997 he scored his first UCI Road World Cup victories by winning the Clásica de San Sebastián and the Grand Prix de Suisse. Over the following years he won many Italian classic races, such as the Giro del Veneto and Tre Valli Varesine.

=== 2000s ===
In 2001, he won the Tirreno–Adriatico stage race.

During the 2004 season he amassed seven victories, including what was at the time an unprecedented treble win in the Ardennes classics, with wins in the Amstel Gold Race, La Flèche Wallonne and Liège–Bastogne–Liège. Only one male rider, Philippe Gilbert, has repeated this feat since, in 2011. Rebellin also scored a number of podium places in top races such as Paris–Nice and the Clásica de San Sebastián. Despite these achievements, Rebellin did not win the 2004 UCI Road World Cup, which went to Paolo Bettini.

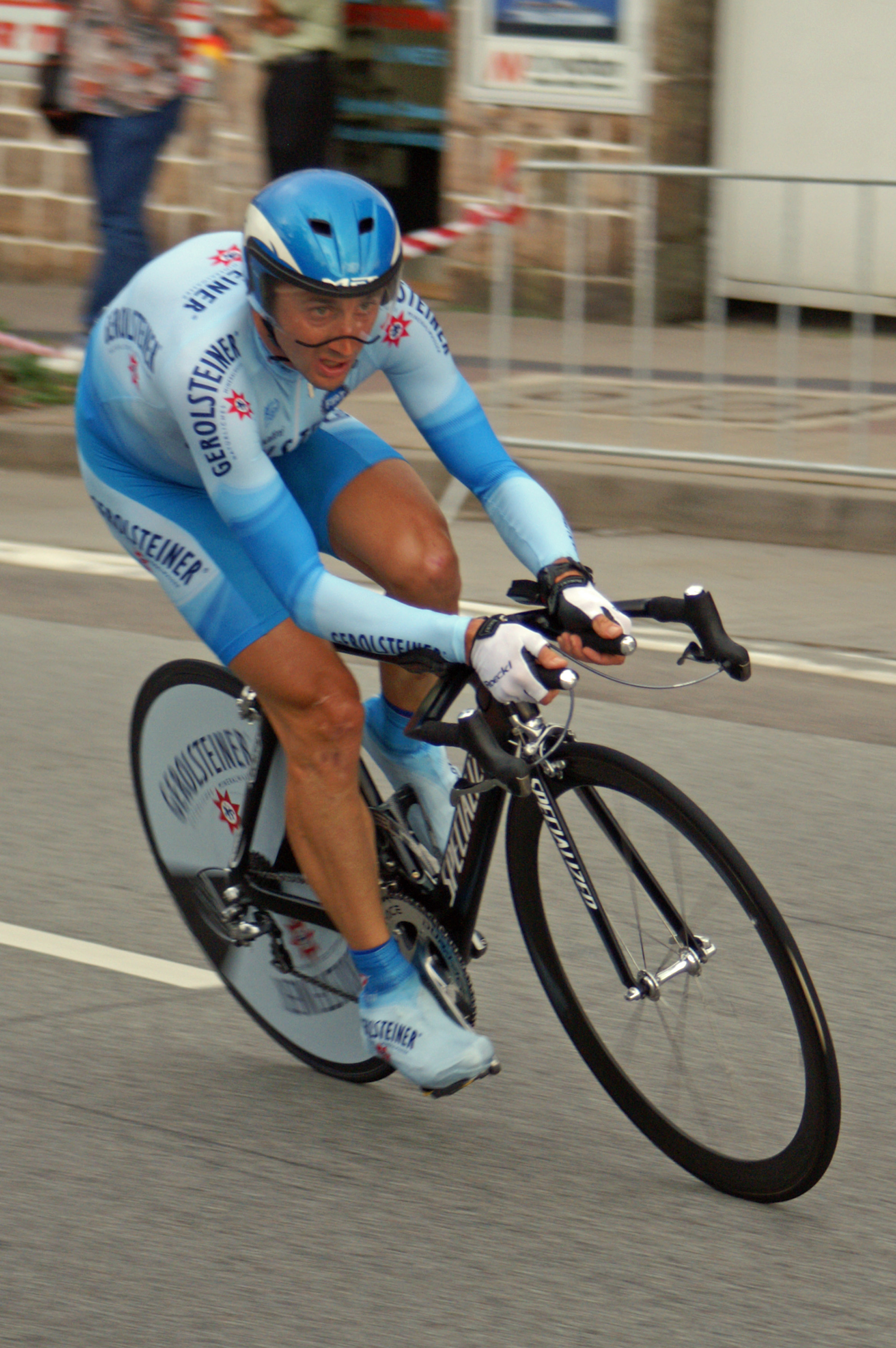
Rebellin time trials at the 2005 Deutschland Tour

In 2005, Rebellin fell short of his triumphs of 2004, but posted yet another solid year. Although he generally concentrated on classics and small tours, he was part of the Gerolsteiner team in the 2005 Tour de France. With a number of solid performances throughout the season but without any individual victories, Rebellin finished as the third-highest ranked rider in the UCI ProTour rankings. Apart from the ProTour races, he only won one race in the 2005 season, taking the first stage of the Brixia Tour.

Rebellin began the 2007 season leading Paris–Nice until Alberto Contador moved him to second in the final stage to Nice. He later finished second in Amstel Gold Race and won the Flèche Wallonne, which made him the oldest ever winner of an UCI ProTour race. He finished second in the UCI ProTour behind Cadel Evans.

Rebellin triumphed early in 2008 with an overall victory in the Paris–Nice. He won the stage race by three seconds, ahead of Rinaldo Nocentini. (Note: The 2008 Paris–Nice took place on uneasy ground, due to a dispute between the race organisers Amaury Sport Organisation (ASO) and the Union Cycliste Internationale (UCI). Despite this, Rebellin's victory was considered a triumph at the top level of cycling.) He went on to win the Tour du Haut Var and show strongly in the Ardennes classics with a second place in the Liège–Bastogne–Liège.

Rebellin finished second in the men's road race at the 2008 Summer Olympics in Beijing having been part of a six-man breakaway group, but his silver medal was revoked in light of his doping sentence by the International Olympic Committee (IOC).

=== 2010s ===
On 16 August 2011, Rebellin took his first victory after returning from his doping suspension, winning Tre Valli Varesine four seconds ahead of Domenico Pozzovivo.

On 28 April 2015, at 43 years old, Rebellin won the queen stage of the Tour of Turkey, a mountaintop finish concluding in Elmali. He beat riders twenty years younger than him to accomplish this feat. With that performance, he grabbed the leader's jersey, but lost it to Kristijan Đurasek on Stage 6. He had to abandon on the last stage since he crashed after hitting a dog.

In 2017, Rebellin rode for the Kuwait–Cartucho.es team, winning three races. After one season with the team, he moved to Sovac–Natura4Ever for the 2018 season. He rode for the team up to February 2019, when his contract was terminated by mutual consent. In April 2019 he announced that he had rejoined the Meridiana–Kamen team and that he would retire from competition after the Italian National Road Race Championships at the end of June. He finished his supposed last race in 18th place, almost five minutes behind new Italian champion Davide Formolo. One day later, Rebellin announced that he would continue his career.

=== 2020s ===
On 8 December 2020, Rebellin announced that he would continue for a record 29th season in professional racing, initially signing with the Cambodia Cycling Academy team for 2021. However, this deal fell through, and in February, Rebellin signed with Italian team Work Service–Marchiol–Vega. Rebellin remained with the team into the 2022 season, which he stated would be his last professional season in a January interview with Spanish publication Marca.

== Death ==
Rebellin was hit by a truck and killed while out on a training ride on 30 November 2022, at the age of 51.

According to the Austrian newspaper Der Standard, Rebellin was killed instantly in the incident, which took place at Montebello Vicentino shortly before midday. The German truck driver stopped briefly, then fled the scene. Police were able to reconstruct the incident and identify the driver. Witnesses had photographed the driver at the scene. The driver had been found guilty of a similar offence before. The driver turned himself in to German authorities in June 2023, awaiting a decision on extradition to Italy. According to prosecutors, the man had tried to destroy evidence by cleaning the vehicle with "a strong cleaning detergent". He had earlier been charged with fleeing the scene of an accident in Southern Italy in 2001 as well as for driving under the influence in 2014. The alleged perpetrator's name was given as Wolfgang Rieke, his extradition to Italy was confirmed by a German court on 6 July 2023. He was eventually sentenced to four years in prison.

== Doping ==
In April 2009, the IOC announced that six athletes had tested positive during the 2008 Summer Olympics, without mentioning names or sports. Later, rumours emerged that the athletes included two cyclists, one of them a medal winner. The Italian Olympic committee then confirmed that a male Italian cyclist had tested positive for CERA during the men's road race, without identifying a name. The next day, on 29 April 2009, the Italian Olympic committee confirmed that Rebellin was an involved athlete. Rebellin's agent sent a request for the analysis of the B sample which was later also confirmed to be positive. The Italian National Olympic Committee subsequently took Rebellin to court, seeking €500,000 in damages and a twelve-month custodial sentence under an Italian law passed in 2000 allowing for athletes who dope to be jailed for up to three years. However, in 2015 a court in Padova ruled that he had no criminal case to answer, in addition to clearing him of charges of tax evasion.

== Major results ==
1988
3rd Overall Grand Prix Rüebliland

1st Stage 3

1989
1st Team time trial, UCI Junior Road World Championships (with Rossano Brasi, Andrea Peron and Cristian Salvato)
1st Overall Driedaagse van Axel
2nd Overall Giro della Lunigiana
3rd Trofeo Buffoni
1990
2nd Giro del Medio Brenta
1991
1st Road race, Mediterranean Games
1st Overall Giro delle Regioni
2nd Amateur road race, UCI Road World Championships
2nd Gran Premio Palio del Recioto
3rd Piccolo Giro di Lombardia
1992
1st Trofeo Alcide Degasperi
2nd Gran Premio Palio del Recioto
2nd Giro di Romagna
5th Giro del Veneto
8th Gran Premio Città di Camaiore
9th Giro di Lombardia
1993
1st Overall Hofbrau Cup

1st Stage 2a

5th Overall Tirreno–Adriatico
5th Giro di Campania
6th Trofeo Melinda
7th Giro di Toscana
8th Overall Tour de Suisse
8th Giro del Friuli
9th Coppa Placci
10th Giro del Veneto
10th Giro della Romagna
1994
3rd Overall Euskal Bizikleta
3rd Giro dell'Etna
5th Amstel Gold Race
6th Overall Tour de Romandie
6th Trofeo Pantalica
8th Overall Giro del Trentino
8th Trofeo Matteotti
8th Tre Valli Varesine
10th Overall Settimana Internazionale di Coppi e Bartali
1995
2nd Giro dell'Appennino
3rd Overall Tour Méditerranéen
3rd Giro della Provincia di Reggio Calabria
4th Overall Tirreno–Adriatico
4th Overall Tour de Romandie
4th Milan–San Remo
5th Overall Tour of the Basque Country
6th La Flèche Wallonne
8th Overall Tour de Suisse
9th Overall Volta a la Comunitat Valenciana
9th Overall Giro del Trentino

1st Stage 1

1996
3rd Trofeo Pantalica
4th Overall Tour de Romandie
4th Trofeo Melinda
5th Japan Cup
5th Giro di Lombardia
6th Overall Giro d'Italia

1st Stage 7
Held after Stages 7–12

6th Liège–Bastogne–Liège
6th Wincanton Classic
7th Overall Vuelta a España
8th Road race, UCI Road World Championships
8th Trofeo Matteotti
8th Subida a Urkiola
10th Overall Tour of the Basque Country
10th La Flèche Wallonne
1997
1st Grand Prix de Suisse
1st Clásica de San Sebastián
1st Trophée des Grimpeurs
3rd Coppa Sabatini
4th Gran Premio Città di Camaiore
7th Overall Tour de Romandie
7th Omloop van het Waasland
7th Grand Prix de la Ville de Lillers
7th Rund um den Henninger Turm
8th Classique des Alpes
8th Giro di Lombardia
10th Klasika Primavera
1998
1st Tre Valli Varesine
1st Giro del Veneto
2nd Overall Critérium International
3rd Trofeo Forla de Navarra
3rd Giro dell'Appennino
3rd Gran Premio Industria e Commercio di Prato
3rd Coppa Sabatini
4th Overall Tour de Wallonie

1st Stage 1

4th Subida a Urkiola
5th Trofeo Melinda
6th Overall Tour de Romandie
6th Giro dell'Emilia
6th Milano–Torino
7th Grand Prix de Suisse
8th Overall Tour de Suisse

1st Stage 1

1999
1st Overall Tour Méditerranéen

1st Stage 1

1st Tour du Haut Var
1st Giro del Veneto
1st Giro del Friuli
1st Memorial Gastone Nencini
2nd Overall Tirreno–Adriatico
2nd Overall Giro della Provincia di Lucca
2nd Trofeo Pantalica
2nd Klasika Primavera
2nd Tre Valli Varesine
3rd Overall Tour of the Basque Country
3rd Trofeo Laigueglia
3rd GP Miguel Induráin
4th Overall Critérium International

1st Stage 2

7th Overall Regio-Tour
7th Züri-Metzgete
2000
1st Giro del Veneto
2nd Gran Premio di Chiasso
2nd Tre Valli Varesine
2nd Coppa Placci
3rd Liège–Bastogne–Liège
3rd Tour du Haut Var
3rd Trofeo Pantalica
3rd Subida a Urkiola
3rd Gran Premio Industria e Commercio di Prato
4th Overall Tour Méditerranéen
4th Züri-Metzgete
4th La Flèche Wallonne
5th Overall Settimana Internazionale di Coppi e Bartali
5th Overall Tour of the Basque Country
6th Giro di Lombardia
7th Clásica de San Sebastián
8th Giro dell'Emilia
10th Overall Danmark Rundt
2001
1st Overall Tirreno–Adriatico

1st Stage 4

1st Overall Tour Méditerranéen
1st GP Industria & Artigianato di Larciano
1st Gran Premio Industria e Commercio di Prato
1st Gran Premio di Chiasso
1st Giro di Romagna
Tour of the Basque Country

1st Stages 1 & 3

1st Stage 2 Brixia Tour
2nd Liège–Bastogne–Liège
2nd Rund um den Henninger Turm
3rd Giro del Veneto
3rd Clásica de San Sebastián
3rd Trofeo Laigueglia
3rd Tour du Haut Var
3rd Giro dell'Emilia
4th Firenze–Pistoia
6th Trofeo Pantalica
7th Giro del Lazio
8th La Flèche Wallonne
8th Amstel Gold Race
2002
1st Gran Premio Città di Camaiore
2nd Giro di Lombardia
2nd Gran Premio di Lugano
2nd Giro del Lazio
2nd Giro del Friuli
3rd HEW Cyclassics
3rd Giro del Veneto
3rd Trofeo Melinda
3rd Coppa Placci
4th Milano–Torino
5th Giro dell'Emilia
6th Tour du Haut Var
6th Rund um den Henninger Turm
6th Tre Valli Varesine
7th Züri-Metzgete
9th Liège–Bastogne–Liège
2003
1st Rund um den Henninger Turm
1st Gran Premio Industria e Commercio di Prato
2nd Overall Vuelta a Andalucía
2nd HEW Cyclassics
2nd Milano–Torino
2nd Coppa Placci
2nd Trofeo Melinda
3rd Overall Paris–Nice

1st Stage 2

3rd Giro dell'Emilia
4th UCI Road World Cup
4th Trofeo Calvia
4th Amstel Gold Race
5th Züri-Metzgete
5th GP Miguel Induráin
7th Clásica de San Sebastián
7th Gran Premio di Chiasso
9th Tour du Haut Var
2004
1st Liège–Bastogne–Liège
1st Amstel Gold Race
1st La Flèche Wallonne
1st Trofeo Melinda
Sachsen Tour

1st Stages 3 & 4a (ITT)

2nd UCI Road World Cup
2nd Overall Paris–Nice

1st Points classification

2nd Coppa Placci
3rd Paris–Bourges
3rd Clásica de San Sebastián
6th Tour du Haut Var
6th Züri-Metzgete
6th HEW Cyclassics
6th Tre Valli Varesine
9th Overall Deutschland Tour
2005
2nd Overall Tour of the Basque Country
2nd Overall Brixia Tour

1st Stage 1

3rd La Flèche Wallonne
3rd GP Ouest-France
4th Amstel Gold Race
4th Tour du Haut Var
4th Giro dell'Emilia
5th HEW Cyclassics
5th Gran Premio di Chiasso
5th Giro di Lombardia
10th Overall Paris–Nice
2006
1st Overall Brixia Tour

1st Stage 1

1st Giro dell'Emilia
2nd Gran Premio di Chiasso
3rd Züri-Metzgete
4th Gran Premio di Lugano
5th Giro di Lombardia
6th Overall Volta ao Algarve
6th Amstel Gold Race
8th Rund um den Henninger Turm
2007
1st Overall Brixia Tour

1st Stage 1

1st La Flèche Wallonne
2nd UCI ProTour
2nd Overall Paris–Nice
2nd Amstel Gold Race
2nd Gran Premio di Chiasso
2nd Giro dell'Emilia
3rd Road race, National Road Championships
4th Overall Volta ao Algarve
5th Liège–Bastogne–Liège
5th Giro di Lombardia
6th Road race, UCI Road World Championships
6th Overall Tour of the Basque Country
6th Vattenfall Cyclassics
10th Overall Deutschland Tour
10th Clásica de San Sebastián
2008
1st Overall Paris–Nice
1st Tour du Haut Var
~~2nd Road race, Olympic Games~~
2nd Liège–Bastogne–Liège
2nd Gran Premio di Lugano
2nd Rund um den Henninger-Turm
2nd Giro dell'Emilia
3rd Clásica de San Sebastián
4th Road race, UCI Road World Championships
4th Overall Brixia Tour
4th Milan–San Remo
4th Amstel Gold Race
6th Overall Tour of Austria
6th La Flèche Wallonne
2009
1st La Flèche Wallonne
2nd Gran Premio di Lugano
3rd Overall Vuelta a Andalucía

1st Stages 4 & 5

3rd Overall Settimana Ciclistica Lombarda
3rd Liège–Bastogne–Liège
6th Overall Tirreno–Adriatico
2011
1st Tre Valli Varesine
1st Trofeo Melinda
2nd Overall Route du Sud
2nd Trofeo Matteotti
2nd Memorial Marco Pantani
2nd Coppa Sabatini
3rd Overall Settimana Ciclistica Lombarda
3rd Gran Premio Città di Camaiore
3rd Gran Premio Nobili Rubinetterie
4th Giro dell'Emilia
5th Overall Brixia Tour
5th Overall Tour of Azerbaijan (Iran)
5th Overall Giro di Padania
6th Overall Vuelta a la Comunidad de Madrid
6th Grand Prix of Aargau Canton
7th Gran Premio Industria e Commercio Artigianato Carnaghese
2012
1st Overall Tour du Gévaudan Languedoc-Roussillon

1st Points classification
1st Stage 2

2nd Overall Tour of Greece
3rd Overall Okolo Slovenska

1st Stage 2

3rd Gran Premio Industria e Commercio di Prato
4th Trofeo Melinda
4th Gran Premio Industria e Commercio Artigianato Carnaghese
5th Overall Giro di Padania
10th Coppa Sabatini
2013
1st Overall Sibiu Cycling Tour

1st Points classification
1st Mountains classification
1st Stage 1

2nd Overall Szlakiem Grodów Piastowskich

1st Stages 1 & 4

3rd Road race, National Road Championships
4th Volta Limburg Classic
4th Coppa Ugo Agostoni
5th Tre Valli Varesine
6th Overall Tour of Estonia
7th Vuelta a Murcia
8th Overall Settimana Internazionale di Coppi e Bartali
9th Overall Vuelta a Andalucía
10th Overall Settimana Ciclistica Lombarda
2014
1st Giro dell'Emilia
2nd Overall Sibiu Cycling Tour

1st Stage 3a (TTT)

3rd Overall Tour du Limousin
3rd Vuelta a Murcia
4th Tre Valli Varesine
4th Coppa Sabatini
5th Overall Tour of Turkey
5th Overall Szlakiem Grodów Piastowskich
6th Tour du Doubs
7th Brabantse Pijl
8th Milano–Torino
10th Clásica de Almería
2015
1st Coppa Ugo Agostoni
1st Stage 3 Tour of Turkey
2nd Overall Sibiu Cycling Tour
3rd Gran Premio Industria e Commercio di Prato
5th Overall Settimana Internazionale di Coppi e Bartali

1st Stage 1b (TTT)

5th Brabantse Pijl
7th Overall Tour of Norway
8th Overall Tour du Haut Var
9th Coppa Sabatini
10th Overall Tour du Limousin
2016
3rd Overall Czech Cycling Tour
5th Overall Tour of Małopolska
5th Rad am Ring
8th Memorial Marco Pantani
9th Overall Dubai Tour
2017
1st Overall Tour de Ijen

1st Stage 1

3rd Overall Tour de Lombok
7th Overall Tour of Iran (Azerbaijan)

1st Stage 5

2018
2nd Overall Tour International de la Wilaya d'Oran

1st Stage 3

4th Overall Tour d'Algérie
2020
8th Overall Sibiu Cycling Tour
2021
7th Overall Tour of Romania
10th Overall Adriatica Ionica Race
10th Overall Sibiu Cycling Tour

=== Grand Tour general classification results timeline ===
Grand Tour	1994	1995	1996	1997	1998	1999	2000	2001	2002	2003	2004	2005	2006	2007	2008
Giro d'Italia	20	22	6	—	30	30	29	DNF	DNF	—	DNF	—	DNF	DNF	DNF
Tour de France	—	—	—	58	—	—	—	—	—	DNF	—	—	—	—	—
Vuelta a España	—	—	7	—	—	DNF	—	—	—	—	—	—	DNF	DNF	DNF

Legend
—	Did not compete
DNF	Did not finish
