= 2004 Züri-Metzgete =

2004 UCI Road World Cup

Race details
- Dates: 22 August 2004
- Stages: 1
- Distance: 241 km (149.8 mi)
- Winning time: 6h 13' 30"

Results
	Winner	Juan Antonio Flecha (ESP)	(Fassa Bortolo)
	Second	Paolo Bettini (ITA)	(Quick-Step–Davitamon)
	Third	Jérôme Pineau (FRA)	(Brioches La Boulangère)

The 2004 Züri-Metzgete was the 89th edition of the Züri-Metzgete road cycling one day race. It was held on 22 August 2004 as part of the 2004 UCI Road World Cup. The race was won by Juan Antonio Flecha of Spain.

== Result ==
	Cyclist	Team	Time
1	Juan Antonio Flecha (ESP)	Fassa Bortolo	6h 13' 30"
2	Paolo Bettini (ITA)	Quick-Step–Davitamon	s.t.
3	Jérôme Pineau (FRA)	Brioches La Boulangère	s.t.
4	Dimitri Fofonov (KAZ)	Cofidis	s.t.
5	Michael Albasini (SUI)	Phonak	s.t.
6	Davide Rebellin (ITA)	Gerolsteiner	s.t.
~~7~~	~~Michael Barry (CAN)~~	U.S. Postal Service	s.t.
~~8~~	~~George Hincapie (USA)~~	U.S. Postal Service	s.t.
9	Óscar Freire (ESP)	Rabobank	s.t.
10	Massimiliano Gentili (ITA)	Domina Vacanze	s.t.
