= Alberto Fernández de la Puebla =

Spanish cyclist

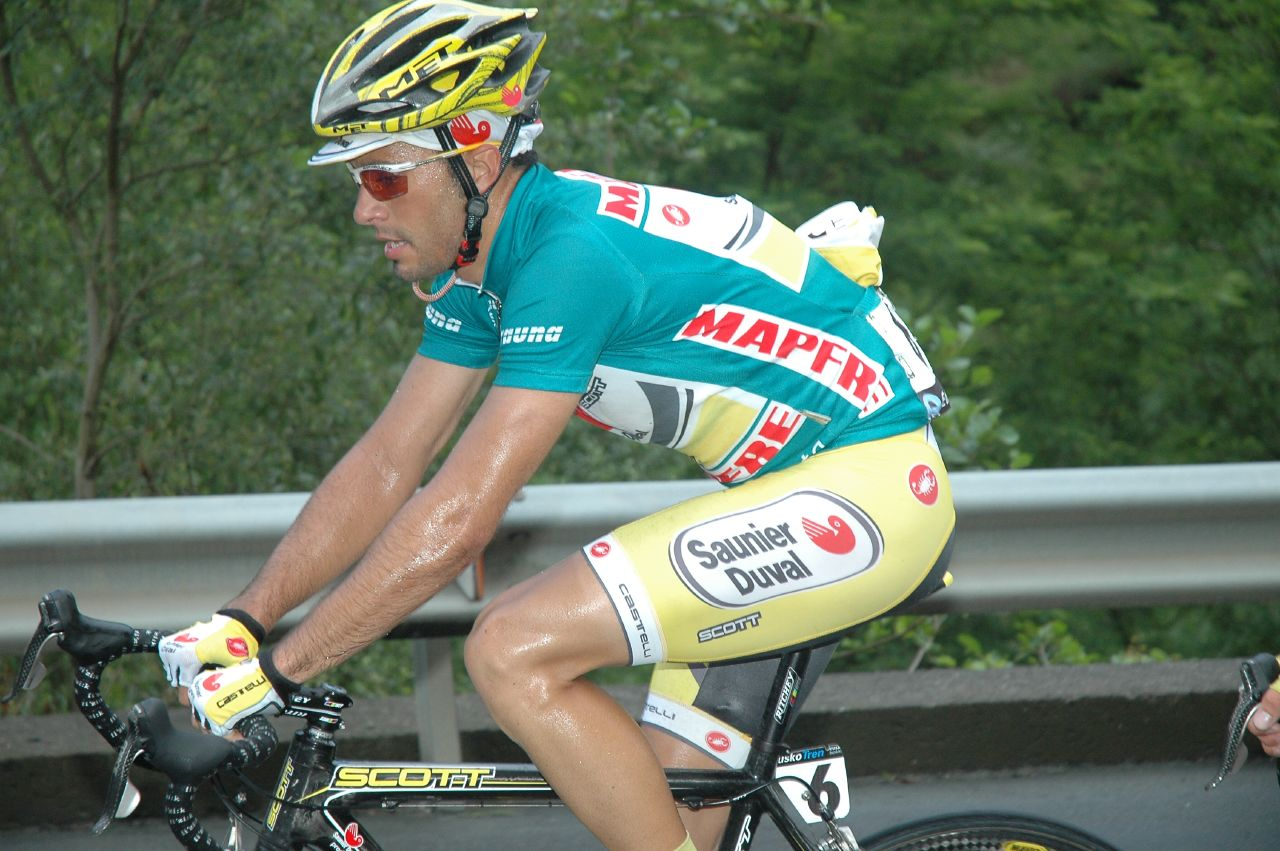

Personal information
- Full name: Alberto Fernández de la Puebla Ramos
- Born: 17 September 1984 (age 42) Madrid, Spain
- Height: 1.74 m (5 ft 9 in)
- Weight: 63 kg (139 lb)

Cycling career
- Sport: Cycling
- Discipline: Road
- Role: Rider

Professional team
- 2006-2009: Saunier Duval–Prodir

Alberto Fernández de la Puebla Ramos (born 17 September 1984) is a Spanish professional road bicycle racer who used to ride for UCI ProTeam Saunier Duval–Prodir, which later changed its name to Fuji–Servetto. Fernández de la Puebla began his professional career in 2006, and recorded his first professional victory with a stage win the 2007 Vuelta a Asturias. In October 2009 he failed a drug test and was suspended from cycling.

== Palmarès ==
- Euskal Bizikleta – 1 stage (2007)
- Vuelta Asturias – 1 stage (2007)
