= 2001 Tirreno–Adriatico =

Race details
- Dates: 14–21 March 2001
- Stages: 8
- Distance: 1,155.2 km (717.8 mi)
- Winning time: 29h 41' 09"

Results
Jersey awarded to the overall winner	Winner	Davide Rebellin (ITA)	(Liquigas–Pata)
	Second	Gabriele Colombo (ITA)	(Cantina Tollo–Acqua & Sapone)
	Third	Michael Boogerd (NED)	(Rabobank)

The 2001 Tirreno–Adriatico was the 36th edition of the Tirreno–Adriatico cycle race and was held from 14 March to 21 March 2001. The race started in Sorrento and finished in San Benedetto del Tronto. The race was won by Davide Rebellin of the Liquigas–Pata team.

== Teams ==
Twenty-five teams, containing a total of 200 riders, participated in the race:

- ONCE–Eroski
- Alessio
- iBanesto.com
- Bonjour
- Cantina Tollo–Acqua & Sapone
- Ceramiche Panaria–Fiordo
- Cofidis
- Crédit Agricole
- CSC–Tiscali
- Domo–Farm Frites–Latexco
- Fassa Bortolo
- Festina
- Française des Jeux
- Lampre–Daikin
- Liquigas–Pata
- Mapei–Quick-Step
- Mercatone Uno–Stream TV
- Mobilvetta Design–Formaggi Trentini
- Rabobank
- Saeco
- Tacconi Sport–Vini Caldirola
- Team Coast–Buffalo
- Team Colpack–Astro
- Team Telekom
- U.S. Postal Service

== Route ==
Stage characteristics and winners
Stage	Date	Course	Distance	Type	Winner
1	14 March	Sorrento to Sorrento	132 km (82 mi)		Biagio Conte (ITA)
2	15 March	Sorrento to Benevento	163 km (101 mi)		Endrio Leoni (ITA)
3	16 March	Benevento to Santuario di Castelpetroso	156 km (97 mi)		Markus Zberg (SUI)
4	17 March	Isernia to Celano	170 km (110 mi)	Medium mountain stage	Davide Rebellin (ITA)
5	18 March	Campli to Torricella Sicura	14.2 km (8.8 mi)	Individual time trial	Roberto Petito (ITA)
6	19 March	Torre San Patrizio to Monte San Pietrangeli	136 km (85 mi)		Romāns Vainšteins (LAT)
7	20 March	Fermo to Ortezzano	223 km (139 mi)		Michael Boogerd (NED)
8	21 March	San Benedetto del Tronto to San Benedetto del Tronto	161 km (100 mi)		Endrio Leoni (ITA)

== General classification ==
Final general classification

Rank	Rider	Team	Time
1	Davide Rebellin (ITA)	Liquigas–Pata	29h 41' 09"
2	Gabriele Colombo (ITA)	Cantina Tollo–Acqua & Sapone	+ 0"
3	Michael Boogerd (NED)	Rabobank	+ 3"
4	Paolo Savoldelli (ITA)	Saeco	+ 6"
5	David Plaza (ESP)	Festina	+ 8"
6	Roberto Petito (ITA)	Fassa Bortolo	+ 13"
7	Oscar Camenzind (SUI)	Lampre–Daikin	+ 27"
8	Beat Zberg (SUI)	Rabobank	+ 28"
9	Carlos Sastre (ESP)	ONCE–Eroski	+ 34"
10	Ruslan Ivanov (MDA)	Alessio	+ 35"
