= Andrey Kivilev =

Kazakhstani cyclist (1973–2003)

Andrei Kivilev

Personal information
- Full name: Андрей Михайлович Кивилев
- Born: 21 September 1973 Taldykorgan, Kazakh SSR, Soviet Union
- Died: 12 March 2003 (aged 29) Saint-Étienne, France

Cycling career
- Sport: Cycling
- Discipline: Road
- Role: Rider

Professional teams
- 1998–1999: Festina–Lotus
- 2000: Ag2r
- 2001–2003: Cofidis

Major wins
- Route du Sud (2001)

Andrei Mikhailovich Kivilev (Андрей Михайлович Кивилёв, 20 September 1973 – 12 March 2003) was a professional road bicycle racer from Taldykorgan, Kazakhstan. In March 2003, he crashed during the Paris–Nice race and subsequently died of his injuries. His death was the trigger for the UCI to implement the compulsory wearing of helmets in all endorsed races.

== Biography ==
Born in Taldykorgan, Almaty Province, Kivilev began his amateur racing career in Spain (Cropusa-Burgos), before moving to France, where he wore the EC Saint-Étienne jersey. In 1993, he had a successful Regio-Tour as part of a successful tour for the Kazakh team: Kivilev won the points competition; teammate Alexander Vinokourov won the combined competition; and the team won the team competition. He secured a professional contract with Festina in 1998 and rode with them until the end of 1999. Kivilev had a modest time at Festina, where his best results were fifth at the Championship of Zurich and seventh at the Critérium International. Despite his lack of professional victories, Kivilev attracted admirers for his riding style, and despite interest from US Postal Service, signed with Ag2r Prévoyance in 2000, before moving to Cofidis in 2001. It was at Cofidis that his career started to take off: in his first season, not only did he win the Route du Sud and stage five of the Dauphiné Libéré race, between Romans-sur-Isère and Grenoble, but also had a sensational performance in the Tour de France. Having lost over eighteen minutes on a windswept and attritional stage 4 between Huy and Verdun, Kivilev was allowed to form part of a fourteen-man breakaway on stage 8 between Colmar and Pontarlier and gained 33 minutes on the race favourites. Kivilev was an able climber, and limited his losses on the big hills. His time trialling let him down when he lost a podium place to Joseba Beloki on the final time trial. Nevertheless, Kivilev finished the tour in 4th position. In fact, with later doping scandals eliminating those ahead of him on the podium, the French newspaper Le Monde retroactively (and unofficially) named Kivilev winner of the 2001 Tour de France.

Kivilev crashed in the 2003 edition of Paris–Nice. The racer in front of him suffered a mechanical problem right as Kivilev took his hands off his handlebars to adjust his earpiece. He died from the accident. After Kivilev's death, the UCI made the wearing of helmets compulsory.

== Major results ==
1995
1st Overall Tour of Turkey
1998
2nd Overall Vuelta Ciclista de Chile
9th GP Villafranca de Ordizia
10th Overall Tour Méditerranéen
1999
5th Züri-Metzgete
7th Overall Critérium International
2000
2nd Tour du Haut Var
3rd Trofeo Laigueglia
6th Overall Tour Méditerranéen
8th Clásica de San Sebastián
8th Züri-Metzgete
9th Overall Critérium du Dauphiné Libéré
2001
1st Overall Route du Sud
4th Overall Tour de France
4th Grand Prix de Villers-Cotterêts
5th Overall Critérium du Dauphiné Libéré

1st Stage 5

2002
3rd Overall Route du Sud
4th Overall Paris–Nice
4th Clásica de San Sebastián
5th Overall Critérium du Dauphiné Libéré
8th Overall Grand Prix du Midi Libre
2003
3rd Tour du Haut Var
