= 2001 Clásica de Almería =

Race details
- Dates: 4 March 2001
- Stages: 1
- Distance: 193 km (119.9 mi)
- Winning time: 4h 33' 12"

Results
	Winner	Tayeb Braikia (DEN)
	Second	Markus Zberg (SUI)
	Third	Endrio Leoni (ITA)

The 2001 Clásica de Almería was the 16th edition of the Clásica de Almería cycle race and was held on 4 March 2001. The race started in Vícar and finished in Vera. The race was won by Tayeb Braikia.

== General classification ==
Final general classification

Rank	Rider	Time
1	Tayeb Braikia (DEN)	4h 33' 12"
2	Markus Zberg (SUI)	+ 0"
3	Endrio Leoni (ITA)	+ 0"
4	David Fernandez Domingo (ESP)	+ 0"
5	Jeroen Blijlevens (NED)	+ 0"
6	Igor Astarloa (ESP)	+ 0"
7	Saulius Šarkauskas (LTU)	+ 0"
8	Martín Garrido (ARG)	+ 0"
9	Eleuterio Anguita (ESP)	+ 0"
10	Gorik Gardeyn (BEL)	+ 0"
