= 2003 Tour du Haut Var =

Race details
- Dates: 22 February 2003
- Stages: 1
- Distance: 180 km (111.8 mi)
- Winning time: 4h 46' 25"

Results
| | Winner | Sylvain Chavanel (FRA) |
| | Second | Samuel Sánchez (ESP) |
| | Third | Andrey Kivilev (KAZ) |

The 2003 Tour du Haut Var was the 35th edition of the Tour du Haut Var cycle race and was held on 22 February 2003. The race started and finished in Draguignan. The race was won by Sylvain Chavanel.

== General classification ==
Final general classification

| Rank | Rider | Time |
|---|---|---|
| 1 | Sylvain Chavanel (FRA) | 4h 46' 25" |
| 2 | Samuel Sánchez (ESP) | + 0" |
| 3 | Andrey Kivilev (KAZ) | + 0" |
| 4 | Stéphane Goubert (FRA) | + 0" |
| 5 | Paolo Bettini (ITA) | + 24" |
| 6 | Patrice Halgand (FRA) | + 24" |
| 7 | Didier Rous (FRA) | + 24" |
| 8 | Laurent Lefèvre (FRA) | + 24" |
| 9 | Davide Rebellin (ITA) | + 24" |
| 10 | Jens Voigt (GER) | + 24" |
