= 2000 UCI Road World Championships – Men's road race =

Men's Individual Road Race
2000 UCI Road World Championships
- Rainbow jersey

Race details
- Dates: 15 October 2000
- Stages: 1
- Distance: 268.9 km (167.1 mi)
- Winning time: 6h 15' 28"

Results
	Winner	Romāns Vainšteins (LAT)	(Latvia)
	Second	Zbigniew Spruch (POL)	(Poland)
	Third	Óscar Freire (ESP)	(Spain)

The men's road race at the 2000 UCI Road World Championships was the 67th edition of the event. The race took place on Sunday 15 October 2000 in Plouay, France. The race was won by Romāns Vainšteins of Latvia.

== Final classification ==
General classification (1–10)

Rank	Rider	Time
1st place, gold medalist(s)	Romāns Vainšteins (LAT)	6h 15' 28"
2nd place, silver medalist(s)	Zbigniew Spruch (POL)	+ 0"
3rd place, bronze medalist(s)	Óscar Freire (ESP)	+ 0"
4	Michele Bartoli (ITA)	+ 0"
5	Tobias Steinhauser (GER)	+ 0"
6	Niki Aebersold (SUI)	+ 0"
7	Scott Sunderland (AUS)	+ 0"
8	Chann McRae (USA)	+ 0"
9	Paolo Bettini (ITA)	+ 0"
10	Francesco Casagrande (ITA)	+ 0"
