= 2000 Clásica de San Sebastián =

Race details
- Dates: 12 August 2000
- Stages: 1
- Distance: 232 km (144.2 mi)
- Winning time: 5h 16' 01"

Results
	Winner	Erik Dekker (NED)	(Rabobank)
	Second	Andrei Tchmil (BEL)	(Lotto–Adecco)
	Third	Romāns Vainšteins (LAT)	(Vini Caldirola–Sidermec)

The 2000 Clásica de San Sebastián was the 20th edition of the Clásica de San Sebastián cycle race and was held on 12 August 2000. The race started and finished in San Sebastián. The race was won by Erik Dekker of the Rabobank team.

== General classification ==
Final general classification

Rank	Rider	Team	Time
1	Erik Dekker (NED)	Rabobank	5h 16' 01"
2	Andrei Tchmil (BEL)	Lotto–Adecco	+ 4"
3	Romāns Vainšteins (LAT)	Vini Caldirola–Sidermec	+ 4"
4	Paolo Bettini (ITA)	Mapei–Quick-Step	+ 4"
5	Óscar Freire (ESP)	Mapei–Quick-Step	+ 4"
6	David Cañada (ESP)	ONCE–Deutsche Bank	+ 4"
7	Davide Rebellin (ITA)	Liquigas–Pata	+ 4"
8	Andrey Kivilev (KAZ)	AG2R Prévoyance	+ 4"
9	Miguel Ángel Martín Perdiguero (ESP)	Vitalicio Seguros	+ 4"
10	Peter Farazijn (BEL)	Cofidis	+ 4"
