= 2008 Tour du Haut Var =

Race details
- Dates: 24 February 2008
- Stages: 1
- Distance: 197.3 km (122.6 mi)
- Winning time: 5h 08' 02"

Results
	Winner	Davide Rebellin (ITA)
	Second	Rinaldo Nocentini (ITA)
	Third	Alexander Bocharov (RUS)

The 2008 Tour du Haut Var was the 40th edition of the Tour du Haut Var cycle race and was held on 24 February 2008. The race started and finished in Draguignan. The race was won by Davide Rebellin.

== General classification ==
Final general classification

Rank	Rider	Time
1	Davide Rebellin (ITA)	5h 08' 02"
2	Rinaldo Nocentini (ITA)	+ 0"
3	Alexander Bocharov (RUS)	+ 0"
4	Anthony Geslin (FRA)	+ 9"
5	Philippe Gilbert (BEL)	+ 9"
6	Michael Albasini (SUI)	+ 9"
7	Bert De Waele (BEL)	+ 9"
8	Nico Sijmens (BEL)	+ 9"
9	Pierre Rolland (FRA)	+ 9"
10	Fränk Schleck (LUX)	+ 9"
