= 2003 UCI Road World Championships – Men's road race =

Men's Individual Road Race
2003 UCI Road World Championships
- Rainbow jersey

Race details
- Dates: 12 October 2003
- Stages: 1
- Distance: 260.4 km (161.8 mi)
- Winning time: 6h 30' 19"

Results
	Winner	Igor Astarloa (ESP)	(Spain)
	Second	Alejandro Valverde (ESP)	(Spain)
	Third	Peter Van Petegem (BEL)	(Belgium)

The men's road race at the 2003 UCI Road World Championships was the 70th edition of the event. The race took place on Sunday 12 October 2003 in Hamilton, Canada on a 12 km (7.5 mi) circuit. The race was won by Igor Astarloa of Spain.

== Course ==
The race took place on a 12 kilometres (7.5 mi) course that climbed the Niagara Escarpment twice per lap – a 1.6 km (0.99 mi) climb with an average gradient of 4.9% and a 2.5 km (1.6 mi) climb with an average gradient of 4.2%. Riders did 21 laps of the course during the race.

== Final classification ==
General classification (1–10)

Rank	Rider	Time
1st place, gold medalist(s)	Igor Astarloa (ESP)	6h 30' 19"
2nd place, silver medalist(s)	Alejandro Valverde (ESP)	+ 5"
3rd place, bronze medalist(s)	Peter Van Petegem (BEL)	+ 5"
4	Paolo Bettini (ITA)	+ 5"
5	Michael Boogerd (NED)	+ 6"
6	Bo Hamburger (DEN)	+ 6"
7	Michael Barry (CAN)	+ 6"
8	Luca Paolini (ITA)	+ 12"
9	Óscar Freire (ESP)	+ 12"
10	Janek Tombak (EST)	+ 12"
