= 2004 HEW Cyclassics =

Race details
- Dates: 1 August 2004
- Stages: 1
- Distance: 250.3 km (155.5 mi)
- Winning time: 5h 51' 39"

Results
	Winner	Stuart O'Grady (AUS)	(Cofidis)
	Second	Paolo Bettini (ITA)	(Quick-Step–Davitamon)
	Third	Igor Astarloa (ESP)	(Lampre)

The 2004 HEW Cyclassics was the ninth edition of the German single-day race. It took place on 1 August 2004, and it was won by Stuart O'Grady, racing for Cofidis.

== Results ==
	Cyclist	Team	Time
1	Stuart O'Grady (AUS)	Cofidis	5h 51' 39"
2	Paolo Bettini (ITA)	Quick-Step–Davitamon	s.t.
3	Igor Astarloa (ESP)	Lampre	s.t.
4	Óscar Freire (ESP)	Rabobank	s.t.
5	Gerben Löwik (NED)	Chocolade Jacques–Wincor Nixdorf	s.t.
6	Davide Rebellin (ITA)	Gerolsteiner	s.t.
7	Erik Zabel (GER)	T-Mobile Team	s.t.
8	Fabrizio Guidi (ITA)	Team CSC	s.t.
9	Andrej Hauptman (SLO)	Lampre	s.t.
10	Paolo Bossoni (ITA)	Lampre	s.t.
