= Eddy Mazzoleni =

Italian cyclist

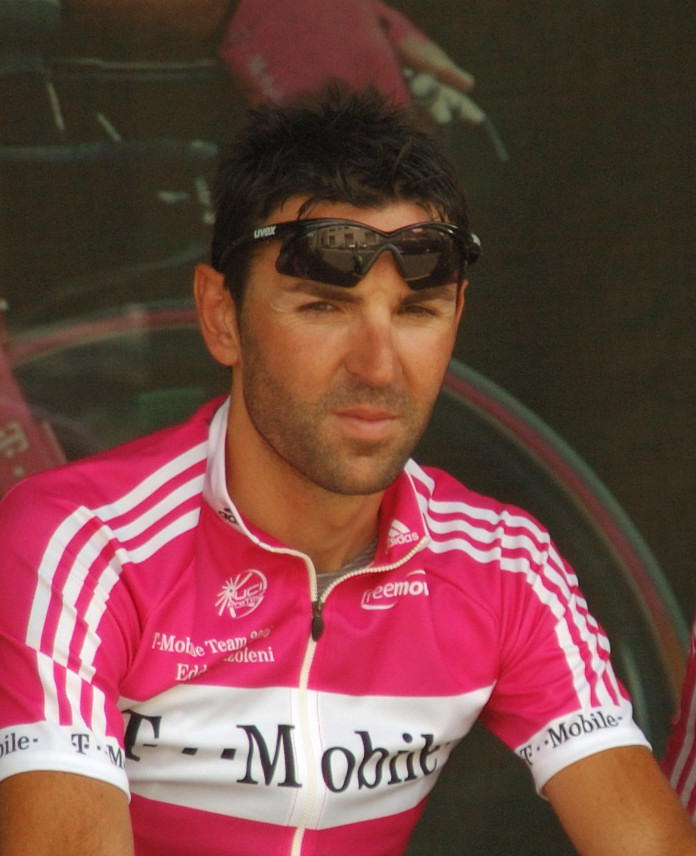

Personal information
- Full name: Eddy Mazzoleni
- Nickname: Mazzo
- Born: 29 July 1973 (age 53) Bergamo, Italy
- Height: 1.82 m (6 ft 0 in)
- Weight: 70 kg (154 lb)

Cycling career
- Sport: Cycling
- Discipline: Road
- Role: Rider
- Rider type: Climbing specialist

Professional teams
- 1996–1999: Saeco
- 2000: Team Polti
- 2001–2002: Tacconi-Vini Caldirola
- 2003: Sidermec-Saunier Duval
- 2004: Saeco
- 2005: Lampre–Caffita
- 2006: T-Mobile Team
- 2007: Astana

Eddy Mazzoleni (born 29 July 1973) is an Italian former professional road bicycle racer who most recently rode for UCI ProTour Astana Team.

== Biography ==
He currently lives in Almenno San Bartolomeo, Italy. Mazzoleni is a talented climber and was a higher finisher on the General Classification in the 2005 Tour de France, notably he finished 3rd on stage 16 to Pau. He also finished 3rd overall in the 2007 Giro d'Italia behind 1st-place winner Danilo Di Luca and 2nd place Andy Schleck. His brother in-law is Ivan Basso. Mazzoleni left Astana on 16 July 2007, following implication in the Italian Oil for Drugs case. On 8 April 2008 Mazzoleni was given a two-year suspension due to his involvement in this case.

His name was on the list of doping tests published by the French Senate on 24 July 2013 that were collected during the 1998 Tour de France and found positive for EPO when retested in 2004.

== Major results ==
1991
3rd Road race, UCI Junior Road World Championships
1994
9th Overall Giro Ciclistico d'Italia
1995
1st Stage 7 Regio-Tour
1997
10th Tre Valli Varesine
1998
2nd Trofeo Laigueglia
3rd Giro della Provincia di Reggio Calabria
1999
3rd Giro di Lombardia
9th Overall Regio-Tour
2000
1st Stage 3a Tour de Romandie
1st Stage 6 Tour de Suisse
2nd Giro dell'Appennino
10th Trofeo Laigueglia
2001
2nd GP Primavera
3rd Milano–Torino
3rd Coppa Placci
3rd GP Industria & Commercio di Prato
5th Trofeo Melinda
5th Giro dell'Emilia
8th Giro del Lazio
8th Giro della Provincia di Siracusa
9th Coppa Ugo Agostoni
9th Luk-Cup Bühl
2002
2nd Trofeo Laigueglia
5th GP Chiasso
6th Overall Tour Méditerranéen
9th Overall Tour de Romandie
2003
6th Stausee Rundfahrt
9th Liège–Bastogne–Liège
10th Overall Giro d'Italia
10th La Flèche Wallonne
10th Giro del Veneto
2004
2nd Milano–Torino
2nd Klasika Primavera
7th Giro di Lombardia
8th Firenze–Pistoia
9th Rund um den Henninger Turm
10th Paris–Tours
2005
1st Giro del Veneto
3rd Clásica de San Sebastián
4th Tre Valli Varesine
9th Trofeo Melinda
2006
9th Overall Deutschland Tour
2007
3rd Overall Giro d'Italia

=== Grand Tour general classification results timeline ===
Grand Tour	1996	1997	1998	1999	2000	2001	2002	2003	2004	2005	2006	2007
Giro d'Italia	—	—	—	—	55	—	15	10	21	—	—	3
Tour de France	—	—	71	—	—	—	70	DNF	—	13	26	—
/ Vuelta a España	DNF	DNF	—	60	—	—	—	—	70	—	—	—

Legend
—	Did not compete
DNF	Did not finish

== See also ==
- List of doping cases in cycling
