= 2004 Paris–Roubaix =

- Official event poster

Race details
- Dates: April 11, 2004
- Stages: 1
- Distance: 258.5 km (160.6 mi)
- Winning time: 6h 40' 26"

Results
	Winner	Magnus Bäckstedt (SWE)	(Alessio–Bianchi)
	Second	Tristan Hoffman (NED)	(Team CSC)
	Third	Roger Hammond (GBR)	(Mr. Bookmaker–Palmans–Collstrop)

The 2004 Paris–Roubaix was the 102nd running of the Paris–Roubaix single-day cycling race, often known as the Hell of the North. It was held on 11 April 2004 over a distance of 261 kilometres (162.2 miles). Among the participating favorites were 1996, 2000 and 2002 winner Johan Museeuw and 2003 winner Peter Van Petegem. The race was part of the UCI Road World Cup.

After passing through famous Arenberg Forest sector, 21 riders were ahead of the peloton, including all pre-race favorites. Jaan Kirsipuu was the first one trying to break away with 60 kilometres to go, advancing 30 seconds over the favourites group, followed by an important attack by Johan Museeuw in Auchy-Lez-Orchies sector, forcing the pace and selecting the lead group. Kirsipuu and Museeuw were eventually captured, at which time Frank Høj and Léon van Bon also tried to break away, being captured after some kilometers in the lead. With 30 kilometres to go Christophe Mengin and Fabio Baldato tried to escape without success but leading to an important move by Tom Boonen, Juan Antonio Flecha and George Hincapie, with the late addition of Leif Hoste. While they were being captured, 2003 winner Peter Van Petegem suffered a puncture and effectively saw his chances of a repeat victory annulled.

In the famous cobblestone section Carrefour de l'Arbre (with 15 kilometres to Roubaix) Museeuw made a series of accelerations which reduced the leading group to Museeuw himself, Magnus Bäckstedt, Roger Hammond, Tristan Hoffman, Fabian Cancellara and George Hincapie, who lost contact soon afterwards but who would hang-on to finish 8th. With 6 kilometres to the finish line, Johan Museeuw suffered a puncture and was consigned to 5th. The four riders in front entered the velodrome with Cancellara leading the group, but it was Magnus Bäckstedt who won the sprint ahead of Hoffman, Hammond and the Swiss. For the first time since 1994, no Belgian rider made it to the final podium.

This 2004 edition of Paris–Roubaix was the last to be ridden by three-time winner Johan Museeuw, who crossed the finish line hand-in-hand with his compatriot and rival Peter Van Petegem (the previous year's champion). The duo received a roaring ovation from the crowd.

== Results ==
2004-04-11: Compiègne–Roubaix, 258.5 km (160.6 mi).

Results (1–10)
	Cyclist	Team	Time	UCI Road World Cup Points
1	Magnus Bäckstedt (SWE)	Alessio–Bianchi	6h 40' 26"	100
2	Tristan Hoffman (NED)	Team CSC	s.t.	70
3	Roger Hammond (GBR)	MrBookmaker-Palmans	s.t.	50
4	Fabian Cancellara (SUI)	Fassa Bortolo	s.t.	40
5	Johan Museeuw (BEL)	Quick-Step–Davitamon	+ 17"	36
6	Peter Van Petegem (BEL)	Lotto–Domo	+ 17"	32
7	Léon van Bon (NED)	Lotto–Domo	+ 29"	28
8	George Hincapie (USA)	U.S. Postal Service	+ 29"	24
9	Tom Boonen (BEL)	Quick-Step–Davitamon	+ 29"	20
10	Frank Høj (DEN)	Team CSC	+ 29"	16
