= 2004 Liège–Bastogne–Liège =

Cycling race in Belgium

The 2004 Liège–Bastogne–Liège took place April 25, 2004 and saw Davide Rebellin win his first Liège–Bastogne–Liège, capping a victorious week having already won the Amstel Gold Race and La Flèche Wallonne to complete a rare Ardennes triple. The previous year's winner, Tyler Hamilton, finished in ninth position.

== Results ==
	Cyclist	Team	Time
1	Davide Rebellin (ITA)	Gerolsteiner	6h 20' 09"
2	Michael Boogerd (NED)	Rabobank	+ 2"
3	Alexander Vinokourov (KAZ)	T-Mobile Team	+ 4"
4	Samuel Sánchez (ESP)	Euskaltel–Euskadi	+ 8"
5	Erik Dekker (NED)	Rabobank	+ 12"
6	Matthias Kessler (GER)	T-Mobile Team	s.t.
7	Michele Scarponi (ITA)	Domina Vacanze	s.t.
8	Ivan Basso (ITA)	Team CSC	s.t.
9	Tyler Hamilton (USA)	Phonak	s.t.
10	Ángel Vicioso (ESP)	Liberty Seguros	s.t.
