= 2004 Milan–San Remo =

Race details
- Dates: 20 March 2004
- Stages: 1
- Distance: 294 km (183 mi)
- Winning time: 7h 11' 23"

Results
	Winner	Óscar Freire (ESP)	(Rabobank)
	Second	Erik Zabel (GER)	(T-Mobile Team)
	Third	Stuart O'Grady (AUS)	(Cofidis)

The 2004 Milan–San Remo cycling race was the 95th edition of the monument classic Milan–San Remo and was won for the first time by Spaniard Óscar Freire of Rabobank. It was held on 20 March 2004 over 294 kilometres. Four times winner Erik Zabel lifted his arms to celebrate too soon and Freire won by 3 centimeters by a bike throw at the line.

== Results ==
	Cyclist	Team	Time
1	Óscar Freire (ESP)	Rabobank	7h 11' 23"
2	Erik Zabel (GER)	T-Mobile Team	s.t.
3	Stuart O'Grady (AUS)	Cofidis	s.t.
4	Alessandro Petacchi (ITA)	Fassa Bortolo	s.t.
5	Max van Heeswijk (NED)	U.S. Postal Service	s.t.
6	Igor Astarloa (ESP)	Cofidis	s.t.
7	Romāns Vainšteins (LAT)	Lampre	s.t.
8	Paolo Bettini (ITA)	Quick-Step–Davitamon	s.t.
9	Miguel Ángel Martín (ESP)	Saunier Duval–Prodir	s.t.
10	Peter Van Petegem (BEL)	Lotto–Domo	s.t.
