= Uroš Murn =

Slovenian cyclist

Personal information
- Full name: Uroš Murn
- Born: 9 February 1975 (age 51) Slovenia
- Height: 1.83 m (6 ft 0 in)
- Weight: 71 kg (157 lb)

Cycling career
- Sport: Cycling
- Discipline: Road
- Role: Rider

Professional teams
- 1997–1999: KRKA–Telekom Slovenije
- 2000–2003: Mobilvetta Design–Rossin
- 2004–2006: Phonak
- 2007: Discovery Channel
- 2008–2010: Adria Mobil

Major wins
- (Slovenia) National Champion (2004)

Uroš Murn (born 9 February 1975) is a Slovenian former professional road bicycle racer, who competed professional from 1997 to 2010.

Born in Novo Mesto, Murn turned professional in 1997 with the Slovenian KRKA–Telekom Slovenije squad. In 2000, Murn moved to the Italian Mobilvetta Design–Rossin team, where he stayed for four seasons. Early successes in the Tours of Croatia and Slovenia, where Murn won two stages and a stage and the sprints competition respectively, were not matched in later season. Murn took the opportunity to move to the top tier of racing with Phonak in 2004.

On 6 December 2010, it was reported by the Slovenian Press Agency that Uroš Murn decided to end his bicycling career.

== Major results ==
1998
1st Stage 3 Course Cycliste de Solidarnosc et des Champions Olympiques
2nd GP Aarhus
6th Overall Tour de Normandie
1999
1st GP Krka
3rd Overall GP Kranj

1st Stage 1

5th Overall UNIQA Classic
6th Route Adélie
2000
Tour of Slovenia

1st Stage 3
1st Sprints classification

1st Stages 1 & 6a Tour of Croatia
4th GP Miguel Induráin
5th Time trial, National Road Championships
10th Schaal Sels
2001
4th Coppa Sabatini
6th Coppa Placci
8th Coppa Bernocchi
2002
1st GP Krka
4th Coppa Placci
4th Giro dell'Appennino
7th Coppa Bernocchi
7th GP Industria & Artigianato di Larciano
10th Overall Brixia Tour
10th Giro del Veneto
2003
1st Stausee Rundfahrt
1st Foreign Riders classification Giro d'Abruzzo
2nd US Pro Championship
5th San Francisco Grand Prix
5th Giro della Provincia di reggio Calabria
5th G.P. Costa degli Etruschi
6th Wachovia Invitational
8th Giro dell'Appennino
9th Wachovia Classic
10th Trofeo Laigueglia
2004
1st Road race, National Road Championships
1st GP Krka
4th Coppa Sabatini
7th San Francisco Grand Prix
8th Paris–Tours
9th Giro del Piemonte
2005
1st Stage 1 Setmana Catalana
9th Paris–Tours
2006
7th Road race, UCI Road World Championships

=== Grand Tour general classification results timeline ===
| Grand Tour | 2001 | 2002 | 2003 | 2004 | 2005 | 2006 |
|---|---|---|---|---|---|---|
| Giro d'Italia | 81 | 86 | — | 91 | 94 | — |
| Tour de France | — | — | — | — | — | — |
| Vuelta a España | — | — | — | — | — | 113 |

Legend
| DSQ | Disqualified |
| DNF | Did not finish |
