= Miguel Ángel Martín Perdiguero =

Spanish cyclist

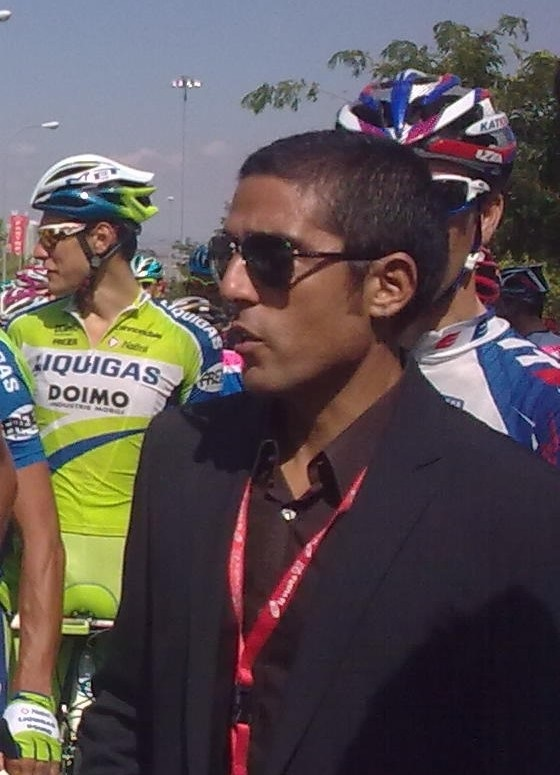
- Miguel Ángel Martín Perdiguero at the 2010 Vuelta a España

Personal information
- Full name: Miguel Ángel Martín Perdiguero
- Born: 14 October 1972 (age 54) Madrid, Spain

Cycling career
- Sport: Cycling
- Current team: Retired
- Discipline: Road
- Role: Rider

Professional teams
- 1997–1998: Kelme–Costa Blanca
- 1999: ONCE–Deutsche Bank
- 2000: Vitalicio Seguros
- 2001–2002: Cantina Tollo–Acqua & Sapone
- 2003: Domina Vacanze–Elitron
- 2004: Saunier Duval–Prodir
- 2005–2006: Phonak

Miguel Ángel Martín Perdiguero (born 14 October 1972 in Madrid) is a Spanish former professional road racing cyclist. He finished his career riding on the UCI ProTour for the Phonak Hearing Systems cycling team, with whom he had ridden since 2005. His career highlights include winning the Clásica de San Sebastián and capturing the overall, points, and mountains competitions along with three stages at the Volta a Catalunya in 2004.

== Major results ==
1998
1st Stage 1 Grand Prix International Mitsubishi MR Cortez
Vuelta a Mallorca

2nd Trofeo Manacor
3rd Trofeo Alcúdia

1999
1st Clásica a los Puertos de Guadarrama
1st Stage 1 Vuelta a Burgos
2nd Clásica de Alcobendas
2nd Subida al Naranco
3rd Escalada a Montjuïc
2000
1st Overall Vuelta a La Rioja

1st Points Classification
1st Stage 4

1st GP Llodio
1st GP Miguel Indurain
9th Clásica de San Sebastián
2001
1st Stage 1 Vuelta a Asturias
1st Stage 1 Clásica Internacional de Alcobendas
2002
Bicicleta Vasca

1st Mountains classification
1st Stage 3

1st Stage 4 Setmana Catalana de Ciclisme
1st Stage 3 Vuelta a Asturias
3rd National Road Race Championships
2003
1st Trofeo Pantalica
Volta a la Comunitat Valenciana

1st Points classification
1st Stage 4

1st Stage 3 Vuelta a Castilla y León
3rd Milano–Torino
5th Giro di Lombardia
2004
1st Clásica de San Sebastián
1st Overall Volta a Catalunya

1st Points classification
1st Mountains classification
1st Stages 2, 3 & 4

1st Mountains classification Vuelta a Murcia
1st Stages 1 & 2 Euskal Bizikleta
1st Stage 5 Vuelta a Asturias
2nd Overall Setmana Catalana de Ciclisme

1st Points Classification
1st Combination classification

2nd Subida al Naranco
2nd GP Miguel Indurain
2nd GP Llodio
9th Milan–San Remo
2005
3rd Clásica de Alcobendas
5th Amstel Gold Race
6th Overall Volta a Catalunya
7th Liège–Bastogne–Liège
2006
6th Liège–Bastogne–Liège
7th Overall Tour of the Basque Country
7th Amstel Gold Race

=== Grand Tour general classification results timeline ===
Grand Tour	1997	1998	1999	2000	2001	2002	2003	2004	2005	2006
Giro d'Italia	DNF	73	—	37	—	—	—	—	—	—
Tour de France	—	—	—	—	—	—	—	—	—	DNF
Vuelta a España	—	—	61	—	DNF	42	32	DNF	DNF	DNF

Legend
—	Did not compete
DNF	Did not finish
