= 2005 Clásica de San Sebastián =

Race details
- Dates: 13 August 2005
- Stages: 1
- Distance: 227 km (141.1 mi)
- Winning time: 5h 24' 18"

Results
	Winner	Constantino Zaballa (ESP)	(Saunier Duval–Prodir)
	Second	Joaquim Rodríguez (ESP)	(Saunier Duval–Prodir)
	Third	Eddy Mazzoleni (ITA)	(Lampre–Caffita)

The 2005 Clásica de San Sebastián was the 25th edition of the Clásica de San Sebastián cycling classic. Constantino Zaballa gave Saunier Duval–Prodir their second win in this race.

== General Standings ==
=== 13-08-2005: San Sebastián, 227 km. ===
	Cyclist	Team	Time
1	Constantino Zaballa (ESP)	Saunier Duval–Prodir	5h 24' 18"
2	Joaquim Rodríguez (ESP)	Saunier Duval–Prodir	+ 31"
3	Eddy Mazzoleni (ITA)	Lampre–Caffita	+ 31"
4	Stefano Garzelli (ITA)	Liquigas-Bianchi	+ 31"
5	Jon Bru (ESP)	Kaiku	+ 31"
6	David Moncoutié (FRA)	Cofidis	+ 31"
7	Haimar Zubeldia (ESP)	Euskaltel–Euskadi	+ 31"
8	Unai Yus (ESP)	Bouygues Télécom	+ 40"
9	Leonardo Bertagnolli (ITA)	Cofidis	+ 40"
10	Samuel Sánchez (ESP)	Euskaltel–Euskadi	+ 43"
