= 2004 Paris–Tours =

Race details
- Dates: 10 October 2004
- Stages: 1
- Distance: 252.5 km (156.9 mi)
- Winning time: 5h 33' 03"

Results
	Winner	Erik Dekker (NED)	(Rabobank)
	Second	Danilo Hondo (GER)	(Gerolsteiner)
	Third	Óscar Freire (ESP)	(Rabobank)

The 2004 Paris–Tours was the 98th edition of the Paris–Tours cycle race and was held on 10 October 2004. The race started in Saint-Arnoult-en-Yvelines and finished in Tours. The race was won by Erik Dekker of the Rabobank team.

== General classification ==
Final general classification

Rank	Rider	Team	Time
1	Erik Dekker (NED)	Rabobank	5h 33' 03"
2	Danilo Hondo (GER)	Gerolsteiner	+ 0"
3	Óscar Freire (ESP)	Rabobank	+ 0"
4	Allan Davis (AUS)	Liberty Seguros	+ 0"
5	Stuart O'Grady (AUS)	Cofidis	+ 0"
6	Paolo Bettini (ITA)	Quick-Step–Davitamon	+ 0"
7	Matthias Kessler (GER)	T-Mobile Team	+ 0"
8	Uroš Murn (SLO)	Phonak	+ 0"
9	Jaan Kirsipuu (EST)	AG2R Prévoyance	+ 0"
10	Eddy Mazzoleni (ITA)	Saeco	+ 0"
