= Magnus Bäckstedt =

Swedish cyclist

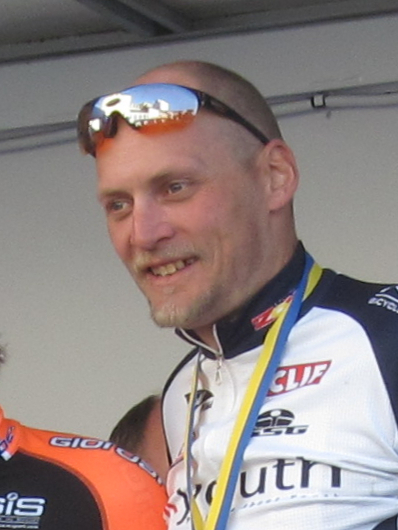
- Bäckstedt in 2011

Personal information
- Full name: Magnus Bäckstedt
- Nicknames: Magnus Maximus; Big Maggy
- Born: 30 January 1975 (age 51) Linköping, Sweden
- Height: 1.93 m (6 ft 4 in)
- Weight: 94 kg (207 lb; 14 st 11 lb)

Cycling career
- Sport: Cycling
- Discipline: Road
- Role: Rider
- Rider type: Classics specialist

Professional teams
- 1996–1997: Palmans–Boghemans
- 1998–2001: GAN / Crédit Agricole
- 2002–2003: Team Fakta
- 2004: Alessio–Bianchi
- 2005–2007: Liquigas–Bianchi
- 2008–2009: Slipstream–Chipotle
- 2009: MagnusMaximusCoffee.com
- 2012: Team UK Youth
- 2013: MG-Maxifuel

Major wins
- Grand Tours Tour de France 1 individual stage (1998) Giro d'Italia Intergiro Classification (2003) 1 TTT (2008) One-Day Races and Classics National Road Race Championships (2007) National Time Trial Championships (2003) Paris–Roubaix (2004)

Magnus Bäckstedt (born 30 January 1975) is a Swedish former professional road bicycle racer. His most notable achievement in cycling is winning Paris–Roubaix in 2004.

== Early life ==
Born in Linköping, Östergötland, Bäckstedt began as a skier, selected for the national team when he was 14.

== Career ==
Bäckstedt began his professional career in 1996, riding for Collstrop before moving to Palmans in 1997. In 1998, having switched to GAN, Bäckstedt came seventh in 1998 Paris–Roubaix and won the 19th stage of the 1998 Tour de France between La Chaux-de-Fonds and Autun.

In 2002 and 2003 he rode for Team Fakta where he was the strongest rider in 2003. When Fakta closed he went to Alessio–Bianchi, where he won the 2004 Paris–Roubaix. The two favourites, Peter van Petegem and Johan Museeuw dropped out after crashes, leaving Bäckstedt to sprint on the track at Roubaix against three others. The manager of Crédit Agricole, Roger Legeay, had predicted that Bäckstedt would one day win the race. He said: "He's not a flahute. He's not especially the fastest, but after 260km on the cobbles, it's often the rider who feels freshest who wins."

In 2005 Bäckstedt moved to Liquigas-Bianchi, and came second on the 7th stage of the 2005 Tour de France. He rode for Slipstream–Chipotle in 2008. He was eliminated in that year's Tour de France for being too slow. He said:

I had been going OK, and on that stage we decided to make it hard from the start because we were close enough to yellow to get the jersey. The first 60km were up and down, but I was going fine. Then there was this fourth-category climb and about halfway up I was suddenly short of breath. It was like I shut down from the waist down. I went straight out of the back. I calmed down and got back on top of it. There was 100km to go, but I went OK. I could see the numbers on the power meter and they were normal for the kind of effort you need to get to the finish on your own inside the time limit. I think I would have made it too, but there was a real steep hill just before the finish and my breathing and legs went again. I ended up four minutes outside the cut-off.

Bäckstedt announced his retirement from professional cycling on 6 February 2009, citing a desire to focus on managing his developmental cycling team, Cyclesport.se-MagnusMaximusCoffee.com. Bäckstedt said he will also continue as a consultant with his former Garmin-Slipstream team. The Swede had struggled with a number of health issues during his career, including a serious knee injury, melanoma, and a separated shoulder and broken collarbone.

On 13 November 2010, Bäckstedt announced at the UK Youth Centenary Gala that he would be coming out of retirement to lead the UK Youth Cycling Team along with Nigel Mansell and his sons.

Bäckstedt rode for the MG Maxifuel team in 2013. Prior to round 8 of the Pearl Izumi Tour Series at Canary Wharf on 6 June 2013, he once again announced he was retiring and that the race would be his final one in professional road racing, his intention being to continue competing in triathlon and Ironman Triathlon events.

== Personal life ==
Bäckstedt is married to British former cyclist Megan Hughes. They live in Wales, moving there from Zulte, Belgium. They have two daughters. His elder daughter, Elynor, won bronze in the Team Pursuit at the 2018 UCI Junior track championships and bronze at the 2018 and 2019 UCI world championships in the junior women's time trial. Younger daughter Zoë made her World Championships debut at the 2021 World Championships in Flanders, Belgium, where she won the gold medal in the Junior Women's Road Race and the silver medal in the Junior Women's Individual Time Trial.

Bäckstedt said: "We used to come back here [to Wales] every time I had a break. I prefer it to Belgium. You can ride 30 miles between villages here, whereas in Belgium you were stopping for traffic lights."

His sister Cecilia is also a racing cyclist.

Bäckstedt runs a coffee business with franchises in the United States and Sweden. Proceeds from the business support Swedish cycling. In 2013 he joined Declan Quigley to commentate on the Tour of Britain for Eurosport.

== Major results ==
1992
1st Time trial, National Junior Road Championships
1993
National Junior Road Championships

1st Road race
1st Time trial
1st Team time trial

1995
Boland Bank Tour

1st Stages 4 & 7

1996
1st Overall Boland Bank Tour

1st Prologue & Stage 5

2nd GP D'Isbergues
1997
1st GP D'Isbergues
3rd Overall Boland Bank Tour
1998
1st Stage 19 Tour de France
2nd Overall Tour of Sweden

1st Stage 4b

1st Sprints competition Four Days of Dunkirk
1st Duo Normand (with Jérôme Neuville)
7th Paris–Roubaix
1999
3rd Overall Tour Down Under
2000
2nd Road race, National Road Championships
9th Vattenfall Cyclassics
2002
1st Road race, National Road Championships
1st Le Samyn
2003
National Road Championships

1st Time trial
2nd Road race

1st Intergiro classification Giro d'Italia
2nd Nokere Koerse
2nd GP d'Ouverture la Marseillaise
3rd GP Herning
4th Ronde van Noord-Holland
2004
1st Paris–Roubaix
2nd Gent–Wevelgem
2nd CSC Classic
2005
4th Paris–Roubaix
8th Overall Tour of Qatar
2007
National Road Championships

1st Road race
2nd Time trial

2008
1st Stage 1 (TTT) Giro d'Italia
8th Overall Three Days of De Panne
