= 2004 Amstel Gold Race =

Dutch cycling race

Race details
- Dates: April 18, 2004
- Stages: 1
- Distance: 251.1 km (156.0 mi)
- Winning time: 6h 23' 44"

Results
	Winner	Davide Rebellin (ITA)	(Gerolsteiner)
	Second	Michael Boogerd (NED)	(Rabobank)
	Third	Paolo Bettini (ITA)	(Quick-Step–Davitamon)

The 2004 Amstel Gold Race was the 39th edition of the annual Amstel Gold Race road bicycle race, held on Sunday April 18, 2004 in the Limburg province, The Netherlands. The race stretched 251.1 kilometres, with the start in Maastricht and the finish in Valkenburg. There were a total of 191 competitors, with 101 riders completing the race.

== Result ==
	Cyclist	Team	Time
1	Davide Rebellin (ITA)	Gerolsteiner	6h 23' 44"
2	Michael Boogerd (NED)	Rabobank	+ 1"
3	Paolo Bettini (ITA)	Quick-Step–Davitamon	+ 18"
4	Danilo Di Luca (ITA)	Saeco	s.t.
5	Peter Van Petegem (BEL)	Lotto–Domo	s.t.
6	Matthias Kessler (GER)	T-Mobile Team	+ 26"
7	Erik Dekker (NED)	Rabobank	+ 41"
~~8~~	Sergei Ivanov (RUS)	T-Mobile Team	+ 52"
9	Mirko Celestino (ITA)	Saeco	+ 53"
10	Giampaolo Caruso (ITA)	Liberty Seguros	+ 55"
