= Constantino Zaballa =

Spanish cyclist

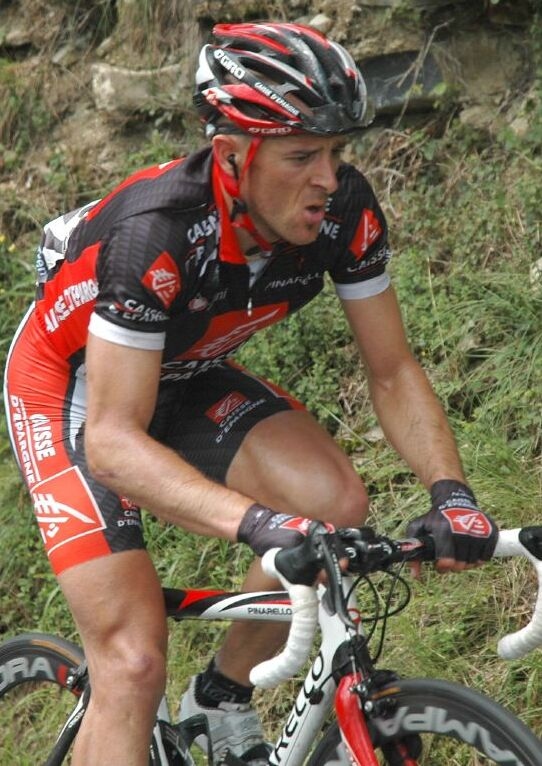
- Constantino Zaballa in June 2007

Personal information
- Full name: Constantino Zaballa Gutiérrez
- Born: 15 May 1978 (age 48) La Hayuela, Cantabria, Spain
- Height: 1.74 m (5 ft 9 in)
- Weight: 69 kg (152 lb)

Cycling career
- Sport: Cycling
- Current team: Retired
- Discipline: Road
- Role: Rider

Professional teams
- 2001–2003: Kelme–Costa Blanca
- 2004–2005: Saunier Duval–Prodir
- 2006–2007: Caisse d'Epargne–Illes Balears
- 2008: LA–MSS
- 2009: LA Alumínios–Rota dos Móveis
- 2010: CC Loulé–Louletano–Aquashow
- 2011: Miche–Guerciotti
- 2013–2014: Christina Watches–Onfone

Major wins
- Grand Tours Vuelta a España 1 individual stage (2004) Stage races Euskal Bizikleta (2007) One-day races and Classics Clásica de San Sebastián (2005)

Constantino Zaballa Gutiérrez (born 15 May 1978 in La Hayuela, Cantabria, Spain) is a Spanish former professional road racing cyclist, best known for winning Clásica de San Sebastián in 2005. Towards the end of his career, Zaballa ventured into cyclocross with the Club Ciclistica Udías.

== Major results ==
2001
1st Stage 8 Tour de l'Avenir
1st Stage 1 Volta a Portugal
2003
3rd Circuito de Getxo
2004
1st Stage 19 Vuelta a España
1st Stage 3 Vuelta a Aragón
2nd Circuito de Getxo
2005
1st Clásica de San Sebastián
3rd Overall Paris-Nice
2007
1st Overall Euskal Bizikleta

1st Stage 3

2008
2nd Overall GP Internacional Paredes Rota dos Móveis

1st Stage 3

2009
2nd Road race, National Road Championships
2010
1st Overall Vuelta a Asturias

1st Stage 5

2011
~~2nd Overall Vuelta a Asturias~~

~~1st Points classification~~
~~1st Stage 5~~

2013
1st Overall Tour de Tipaza

1st Stage 1

1st Destination Thy
2nd Overall Tour of China I
3rd Overall Tour de Korea
3rd Overall Sibiu Cycling Tour
4th Overall Tour d'Algérie
4th Overall Tour de Blida
4th Circuit d'Alger
