= Gran Premio di Chiasso =

Gran Premio di Chiasso - Casinò Admiral
Race details
- Date: Early-March
- Region: Chiasso, Switzerland
- English name: Grand Prix of Chiasso
- Local name(s): Gran Premio di Chiasso (in Italian)
- Discipline: Road
- Competition: UCI Europe Tour
- Type: Single-day
- Organiser: Velo Club Chiasso

History
- First edition: 1995
- Editions: 9
- Final edition: 2007
- First winner: Beat Huber (SUI)
- Most wins: Giuliano Figueras (ITA) (2 wins)
- Final winner: Pavel Brutt (RUS)

The Gran Premio di Chiasso (English: Grand Prix of Chiasso) was an annual road bicycle race held in Chiasso, Switzerland. It was a 1.1 event on the UCI Europe Tour after 2005. The last edition was in 2007, after which it was replaced by the Gran Premio dell'Insubria-Lugano, which itself ended in 2011.

== Winners ==
Year	Country	Rider	Team
1995	Switzerland	Beat Huber	
1996	Italy	Federico Profetti	
1997	Ukraine	Serhiy Ushakov	Team Polti
1998	Italy	Gianluca Bortolami	Festina–Lotus
1999	Latvia	Romāns Vainšteins	Vini Caldirola
2000	Italy	Giuliano Figueras	
2001	Italy	Davide Rebellin	
2002	Switzerland	Rubens Bertogliati	
2003	Italy	Giuliano Figueras	
2004	Italy	Franco Pellizotti	
2005	Luxembourg	Kim Kirchen	T-Mobile Team
2006	Netherlands	Remmert Wielinga	Quick-Step–Innergetic
2007	Russia	Pavel Brutt	Tinkoff Credit Systems
