= Giuseppe Muraglia =

Italian cyclist

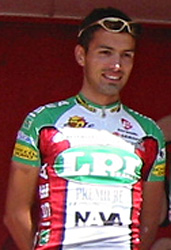
- Giuseppe Muraglia, is an Italian racing cyclist.

Personal information
- Full name: Giuseppe Muraglia
- Born: August 3, 1979 (age 47) Andria, Italy

Cycling career
- Sport: Cycling
- Discipline: Road
- Role: Rider

Professional teams
- 2003–2004: Formaggi Pinzolo Fiavè
- 2005–2006: LPR–Piacenza
- 2007: Acqua & Sapone–Caffè Mokambo
- 2009–2011: CDC-Cavaliere

Giuseppe Muraglia (born August 3, 1979 in Andria) is an Italian racing cyclist, who last rode for the Italian team D'Angelo & Antenucci-Nippo. In October 2007 he was suspended from riding for two years following a positive test after winning the Clásica de Almería.

== Professional career ==
In 2007 he tested positive for hCG after winning the 2007 edition of Clásica de Almería. In late 2007 he was suspended from racing for two years and he was also sacked from his team, Acqua & Sapone–Caffè Mokambo.

== Palmarès ==
2002
1st, Baby Giro
2005
1st, Stage 2, Giro del Trentino
2007
1st, Clásica de Almería
2010
1st, Stage 3, Giro della Provincia di Reggio Calabria

== See also ==
- List of doping cases in cycling
- List of sportspeople sanctioned for doping offences
