= Simone Masciarelli =

Italian cyclist

Personal information
- Born: 2 January 1980 (age 46) Pescara, Italy

Cycling career
- Sport: Cycling
- Current team: Retired
- Discipline: Road
- Role: Rider

Professional teams
- 2000: Mobilvetta Design-Rossin (until 1/7)
- 2000-2001: Cantina Tollo
- 2002: Acqua & Sapone-Cantina Tollo
- 2003-3004: Vini Caldirola
- 2005-2012: Acqua & Sapone
- 2013: Utensilnord-Ora24.eu

Simone Masciarelli (born 2 January 1980 in Pescara) is a former Italian cyclist. He competed in professional road cycling events during the 2000s. He is the son of former professional cyclist Palmiro Masciarelli.

== Major results ==
2001
2nd Gran Premio Nobili Rubinetterie
7th Trofeo Matteotti
2002
2nd Trofeo Città di Castelfidardo
5th GP Industria & Artigianato Larciano
5th Giro d'Oro
9th Giro del Friuli
2003
6th GP Fred Mengoni
7th Stausee-Rundfahrt Klingnau
9th Trofeo Città di Castelfidardo
2006
4th GP Industria & Commercio di Prato
5th Coppa Sabatini
6th Giro dell'Emilia
7th Memorial Cimurri
