= 2005 Vuelta a España, Stage 1 to Stage 11 =

Cycling race stages

The 2005 Vuelta a España was the 60th edition of the Vuelta a España, one of cycling's Grand Tours. The Vuelta began in Granada, with an individual time trial on 27 August, and Stage 11 occurred on 6 September with a stage to Cerler. The race finished in Madrid on 18 September.

== Stage 1 ==
27 August 2005 — Granada to Granada, 7 km (4.3 mi) (ITT)

Stage 1 result and general classification after stage 1

Rank	Rider	Team	Time
1	Denis Menchov (RUS)	Rabobank	9' 45"
2	Rik Verbrugghe (BEL)	Quick-Step–Innergetic	+ 1"
3	Bradley McGee (AUS)	Française des Jeux	+ 3"
4	Carlos Sastre (ESP)	Team CSC	+ 7"
5	Tom Danielson (USA)	Discovery Channel	+ 12"
6	Rubén Plaza (ESP)	Comunidad Valenciana–Elche	+ 13"
7	Roberto Heras (ESP)	Liberty Seguros–Würth	+ 15"
8	David Bernabeu (ESP)	Comunidad Valenciana–Elche	s.t.
9	Santiago Botero (COL)	Phonak	+ 18"
10	Gilberto Simoni (ITA)	Lampre–Caffita	+ 20"

== Stage 2 ==
28 August 2005 — Granada to Córdoba, 189.3 km (117.6 mi)

Stage 2 result

Rank	Rider	Team	Time
1	Leonardo Bertagnolli (ITA)	Cofidis	4h 52' 27"
2	Bradley McGee (AUS)	Française des Jeux	s.t.
3	Juan Antonio Flecha (ESP)	Fassa Bortolo	s.t.
4	Francisco Javier Vila Errandonea (ESP)	Lampre–Caffita	s.t.
5	Ángel Vicioso (ESP)	Liberty Seguros–Würth	s.t.
6	Unai Yus Kejereta (ESP)	Bouygues Télécom	s.t.
7	Joaquim Rodríguez (ESP)	Saunier Duval–Prodir	s.t.
8	Santos González (ESP)	Phonak	+ 33"
9	Carlos García Quesada (ESP)	Comunidad Valenciana–Elche	s.t.
10	Pablo Lastras (ESP)	Illes Balears–Caisse d'Epargne	s.t.

General classification after stage 2

Rank	Rider	Team	Time
1	Bradley McGee (AUS)	Française des Jeux	5h 02' 01"
2	Leonardo Bertagnolli (ITA)	Cofidis	+ 22"
3	Juan Antonio Flecha (ESP)	Fassa Bortolo	+ 31"
4	Ángel Vicioso (ESP)	Liberty Seguros–Würth	s.t.
5	Francisco Javier Vila Errandonea (ESP)	Lampre–Caffita	+ 32"
6	Joaquim Rodríguez (ESP)	Saunier Duval–Prodir	+ 35"
7	Unai Yus (ESP)	Bouygues Télécom	+ 43"
8	Rik Verbrugghe (BEL)	Quick-Step–Innergetic	+ 52"
9	Denis Menchov (RUS)	Rabobank	+ 55"
10	Carlos Sastre (ESP)	Team CSC	+ 1' 02"

== Stage 3 ==
29 August 2005 — Córdoba to Puertollano, 189.3 km (117.6 mi)

Stage 3 result

Rank	Rider	Team	Time
1	Alessandro Petacchi (ITA)	Fassa Bortolo	3h 48' 41"
2	Erik Zabel (GER)	T-Mobile Team	s.t.
3	Tom Boonen (BEL)	Quick-Step–Innergetic	s.t.
4	Thor Hushovd (NOR)	Crédit Agricole	s.t.
5	Giosuè Bonomi (ITA)	Lampre–Caffita	s.t.
6	Max van Heeswijk (NED)	Discovery Channel	s.t.
7	Miguel Ángel Perdiguero (ESP)	Phonak	s.t.
8	Tom Steels (BEL)	Davitamon–Lotto	s.t.
9	Marco Velo (ITA)	Fassa Bortolo	s.t.
10	Patrick Calcagni (SUI)	Liquigas–Bianchi	s.t.

General classification after stage 3

Rank	Rider	Team	Time
1	Bradley McGee (AUS)	Française des Jeux	8h 50' 32"
2	Leonardo Bertagnolli (ITA)	Cofidis	+ 32"
3	Juan Antonio Flecha (ESP)	Fassa Bortolo	+ 39"
4	Joaquim Rodríguez (ESP)	Saunier Duval–Prodir	+ 41"
5	Ángel Vicioso (ESP)	Liberty Seguros–Würth	s.t.
6	Francisco Javier Vila Errandonea (ESP)	Lampre–Caffita	+ 42"
7	Unai Yus (ESP)	Bouygues Télécom	+ 53"
8	Rik Verbrugghe (BEL)	Quick-Step–Innergetic	+ 1' 02"
9	Denis Menchov (RUS)	Rabobank	+ 1' 05"
10	Carlos Sastre (ESP)	Team CSC	+ 1' 12"

== Stage 4 ==
30 August 2005 — Ciudad Real to Argamasilla de Alba, 232.3 km (144.3 mi)

Stage 4 result

Rank	Rider	Team	Time
1	Alessandro Petacchi (ITA)	Fassa Bortolo	5h 41' 29"
2	Thor Hushovd (NOR)	Crédit Agricole	s.t.
3	Erik Zabel (GER)	T-Mobile Team	s.t.
4	Marco Zanotti (ITA)	Liquigas–Bianchi	s.t.
5	Tom Steels (BEL)	Davitamon–Lotto	s.t.
6	Bernhard Eisel (AUT)	Française des Jeux	s.t.
7	Sébastien Chavanel (FRA)	Bouygues Télécom	s.t.
8	Tom Boonen (BEL)	Quick-Step–Innergetic	s.t.
9	Giosuè Bonomi (ITA)	Lampre–Caffita	s.t.
10	René Haselbacher (AUT)	Gerolsteiner	s.t.

General classification after stage 4

Rank	Rider	Team	Time
1	Bradley McGee (AUS)	Française des Jeux	14h 32' 01"
2	Leonardo Bertagnolli (ITA)	Cofidis	+ 32"
3	Juan Antonio Flecha (ESP)	Fassa Bortolo	+ 39"
4	Joaquim Rodríguez (ESP)	Saunier Duval–Prodir	+ 41"
5	Ángel Vicioso (ESP)	Liberty Seguros–Würth	s.t.
6	Francisco Javier Vila Errandonea (ESP)	Lampre–Caffita	+ 42"
7	Unai Yus (ESP)	Bouygues Télécom	+ 53"
8	Rik Verbrugghe (BEL)	Quick-Step–Innergetic	+ 1' 02"
9	Denis Menchov (RUS)	Rabobank	+ 1' 05"
10	Carlos Sastre (ESP)	Team CSC	+ 1' 12"

== Stage 5 ==
31 August 2005 — Alcázar de San Juan to Cuenca, 176 km (109 mi)

Stage 5 result

Rank	Rider	Team	Time
1	Thor Hushovd (NOR)	Crédit Agricole	3h 41' 52"
2	Miguel Ángel Perdiguero (ESP)	Saunier Duval–Prodir	s.t.
3	Josep Jufré (ESP)	Relax–Fuenlabrada	s.t.
4	Iván Gutiérrez (ESP)	Illes Balears–Caisse d'Epargne	s.t.
5	David Blanco (ESP)	Comunidad Valenciana–Elche	s.t.
6	Unai Yus Kejereta (ESP)	Bouygues Télécom	s.t.
7	Mauricio Alberto Ardila Cano (COL)	Davitamon–Lotto	s.t.
8	Joaquim Rodríguez (ESP)	Saunier Duval–Prodir	s.t.
9	Samuel Sánchez (ESP)	Euskaltel–Euskadi	s.t.
10	Egoi Martínez (ESP)	Euskaltel–Euskadi	s.t.

General classification after stage 5

Rank	Rider	Team	Time
1	Bradley McGee (AUS)	Française des Jeux	18h 13' 53"
2	Leonardo Bertagnolli (ITA)	Cofidis	+ 32"
3	Joaquim Rodríguez (ESP)	Saunier Duval–Prodir	+ 41"
4	Francisco Javier Vila Errandonea (ESP)	Lampre–Caffita	+ 42"
5	Unai Yus (ESP)	Bouygues Télécom	+ 53"
6	Denis Menchov (RUS)	Rabobank	+ 1' 05"
7	Carlos Sastre (ESP)	Team CSC	+ 1' 12"
8	Miguel Ángel Perdiguero (ESP)	Phonak	+ 1' 17"
9	Tom Danielson (USA)	Discovery Channel	s.t.
10	Roberto Heras (ESP)	Liberty Seguros–Würth	+ 1' 20"

== Stage 6 ==
1 September 2005 — Cuenca to Valdelinares, 217 km (135 mi)

Stage 6 result

Rank	Rider	Team	Time
1	Roberto Heras (ESP)	Liberty Seguros–Würth	5h 27' 20"
2	Denis Menchov (RUS)	Rabobank	+ 13"
3	David Blanco (ESP)	Comunidad Valenciana–Elche	+ 28"
4	Carlos García Quesada (ESP)	Comunidad Valenciana–Elche	+ 42"
5	Juan Miguel Mercado (ESP)	Quick-Step–Innergetic	+ 49"
6	Francisco Mancebo (ESP)	Illes Balears–Caisse d'Epargne	s.t.
7	Carlos Sastre (ESP)	Team CSC	s.t.
8	Jakob Piil (DEN)	Team CSC	+ 52"
9	Marcos Serrano (ESP)	Liberty Seguros–Würth	+ 1' 15"
10	Michele Scarponi (ITA)	Liberty Seguros–Würth	s.t.

General classification after stage 6

Rank	Rider	Team	Time
1	Roberto Heras (ESP)	Liberty Seguros–Würth	23h 42' 13"
2	Denis Menchov (RUS)	Rabobank	+ 6"
3	Carlos Sastre (ESP)	Team CSC	+ 1' 01"
4	Joaquim Rodríguez (ESP)	Saunier Duval–Prodir	+ 1' 03"
5	David Blanco (ESP)	Comunidad Valenciana–Elche	+ 1' 05"
6	Francisco Mancebo (ESP)	Illes Balears–Caisse d'Epargne	+ 1' 20"
7	Carlos García Quesada (ESP)	Comunidad Valenciana–Elche	+ 1' 33"
8	Juan Miguel Mercado (ESP)	Quick-Step–Innergetic	s.t.
9	Unai Yus (ESP)	Bouygues Télécom	s.t.
10	Michele Scarponi (ITA)	Liberty Seguros–Würth	+ 1' 52"

== Stage 7 ==
2 September 2005 — Teruel to Vinaròs, 212.5 km (132.0 mi)

Stage 7 result

Rank	Rider	Team	Time
1	Max van Heeswijk (NED)	Discovery Channel	5h 21' 21"
2	Erik Zabel (GER)	T-Mobile Team	s.t.
3	Alberto Ongarato (ITA)	Fassa Bortolo	s.t.
4	Marco Zanotti (ITA)	Liquigas–Bianchi	s.t.
5	Tom Steels (BEL)	Davitamon–Lotto	s.t.
6	Thor Hushovd (NOR)	Crédit Agricole	s.t.
7	Iván Gutiérrez (ESP)	Illes Balears–Caisse d'Epargne	s.t.
8	Anthony Geslin (FRA)	Bouygues Télécom	s.t.
9	Samuel Sánchez (ESP)	Euskaltel–Euskadi	s.t.
10	Martin Elmiger (SUI)	Phonak	s.t.

General classification after stage 7

Rank	Rider	Team	Time
1	Roberto Heras (ESP)	Liberty Seguros–Würth	29h 03' 28"
2	Denis Menchov (RUS)	Rabobank	+ 12"
3	Carlos Sastre (ESP)	Team CSC	+ 1' 07"
4	Joaquim Rodríguez (ESP)	Saunier Duval–Prodir	+ 1' 09"
5	David Blanco (ESP)	Comunidad Valenciana–Elche	+ 1' 11"
6	Francisco Mancebo (ESP)	Illes Balears–Caisse d'Epargne	+ 1' 26"
7	Carlos García Quesada (ESP)	Comunidad Valenciana–Elche	+ 1' 39"
8	Juan Miguel Mercado (ESP)	Quick-Step–Innergetic	s.t.
9	Unai Yus (ESP)	Bouygues Télécom	s.t.
10	Michele Scarponi (ITA)	Liberty Seguros–Würth	+ 1' 58"

== Stage 8 ==
3 September 2005 — Tarragona to Lloret de Mar, 189 km (117 mi)

Stage 8 result

Rank	Rider	Team	Time
1	Alessandro Petacchi (ITA)	Fassa Bortolo	4h 19' 14"
2	Thor Hushovd (NOR)	Crédit Agricole	s.t.
3	Paolo Bettini (ITA)	Quick-Step–Innergetic	s.t.
4	Francisco Ventoso (ESP)	Saunier Duval–Prodir	s.t.
5	Tom Boonen (BEL)	Quick-Step–Innergetic	s.t.
6	Heinrich Haussler (GER)	Gerolsteiner	s.t.
7	Erik Zabel (GER)	T-Mobile Team	s.t.
8	Arnaud Coyot (FRA)	Cofidis	s.t.
9	Marcus Burghardt (GER)	T-Mobile Team	s.t.
10	Santos González (ESP)	Phonak	+ 3"

General classification after stage 8

Rank	Rider	Team	Time
1	Roberto Heras (ESP)	Liberty Seguros–Würth	33h 22' 47"
2	Denis Menchov (RUS)	Rabobank	+ 12"
3	Carlos Sastre (ESP)	Team CSC	+ 1' 07"
4	Joaquim Rodríguez (ESP)	Saunier Duval–Prodir	+ 1' 09"
5	David Blanco (ESP)	Comunidad Valenciana–Elche	+ 1' 11"
6	Francisco Mancebo (ESP)	Illes Balears–Caisse d'Epargne	+ 1' 26"
7	Unai Yus (ESP)	Bouygues Télécom	+ 1' 37"
8	Carlos García Quesada (ESP)	Comunidad Valenciana–Elche	+ 1' 39"
9	Juan Miguel Mercado (ESP)	Quick-Step–Innergetic	s.t.
10	Michele Scarponi (ITA)	Liberty Seguros–Würth	+ 1' 58"

== Stage 9 ==
4 September 2005 — Lloret de Mar to Lloret de Mar, 48 km (30 mi) (ITT)

Stage 9 result

Rank	Rider	Team	Time
1	Denis Menchov (RUS)	Rabobank	1h 00' 54"
2	Rubén Plaza (ESP)	Comunidad Valenciana–Elche	+ 9"
3	Francisco Mancebo (ESP)	Illes Balears–Caisse d'Epargne	+ 37"
4	Carlos Sastre (ESP)	Team CSC	+ 41"
5	Roberto Heras (ESP)	Liberty Seguros–Würth	+ 59"
6	Tom Danielson (USA)	Discovery Channel	+ 1' 16"
7	Víctor Hugo Peña (COL)	Phonak	+ 1' 36"
8	Uwe Peschel (GER)	Gerolsteiner	+ 1' 39"
9	Santos González (ESP)	Phonak	+ 1' 45"
10	Óscar Pereiro (ESP)	Phonak	+ 1' 47"

General classification after stage 9

Rank	Rider	Team	Time
1	Denis Menchov (RUS)	Rabobank	34h 23' 53"
2	Roberto Heras (ESP)	Liberty Seguros–Würth	+ 47"
3	Carlos Sastre (ESP)	Team CSC	+ 1' 36"
4	Francisco Mancebo (ESP)	Illes Balears–Caisse d'Epargne	+ 1' 53"
5	Tom Danielson (USA)	Discovery Channel	+ 3' 07"
6	David Blanco (ESP)	Comunidad Valenciana–Elche	+ 3' 23"
7	Carlos García Quesada (ESP)	Comunidad Valenciana–Elche	+ 3' 29"
8	Santos González (ESP)	Phonak	+ 3' 38"
9	Michele Scarponi (ITA)	Liberty Seguros–Würth	+ 3' 46"
10	Rubén Plaza (ESP)	Comunidad Valenciana–Elche	+ 4' 11"

== Stage 10 ==
5 September 2005 — La Vall d'en Bas to Ordino-Arcalis, 206.3 km (128.2 mi)

Stage 10 result

Rank	Rider	Team	Time
1	Francisco Mancebo (ESP)	Illes Balears–Caisse d'Epargne	5h 33' 49"
2	Roberto Heras (ESP)	Liberty Seguros–Würth	s.t.
3	Denis Menchov (RUS)	Rabobank	s.t.
4	Carlos García Quesada (ESP)	Comunidad Valenciana–Elche	+ 2"
5	Juan Miguel Mercado (ESP)	Quick-Step–Innergetic	+ 6"
6	Manuel Beltrán (ESP)	Discovery Channel	+ 16"
7	Rubén Plaza (ESP)	Comunidad Valenciana–Elche	s.t.
8	Carlos Sastre (ESP)	Team CSC	+ 21"
9	Óscar Sevilla (ESP)	T-Mobile Team	+ 28"
10	Tom Danielson (USA)	Discovery Channel	+ 1' 16"

General classification after stage 10

Rank	Rider	Team	Time
1	Denis Menchov (RUS)	Rabobank	39h 57' 42"
2	Roberto Heras (ESP)	Liberty Seguros–Würth	+ 47"
3	Francisco Mancebo (ESP)	Illes Balears–Caisse d'Epargne	+ 1' 53"
4	Carlos Sastre (ESP)	Team CSC	+ 1' 57"
5	Carlos García Quesada (ESP)	Comunidad Valenciana–Elche	+ 3' 31"
6	Tom Danielson (USA)	Discovery Channel	+ 4' 23"
7	Rubén Plaza (ESP)	Comunidad Valenciana–Elche	+ 4' 27"
8	Manuel Beltrán (ESP)	Discovery Channel	+ 4' 29"
9	Juan Miguel Mercado (ESP)	Quick-Step–Innergetic	+ 5' 05"
10	Michele Scarponi (ITA)	Liberty Seguros–Würth	+ 5' 14"

== Stage 11 ==
6 September 2005 — Andorra to Cerler, 186.6 km (115.9 mi)

Stage 11 result

Rank	Rider	Team	Time
1	Roberto Laiseka (ESP)	Euskaltel–Euskadi	5h 09' 38"
2	Carlos Sastre (ESP)	Team CSC	+ 15"
3	Roberto Heras (ESP)	Liberty Seguros–Würth	s.t.
4	Francisco Mancebo (ESP)	Illes Balears–Caisse d'Epargne	s.t.
5	Denis Menchov (RUS)	Rabobank	s.t.
6	Carlos García Quesada (ESP)	Comunidad Valenciana–Elche	s.t.
7	Miguel Ángel Perdiguero (ESP)	Phonak	+ 55"
8	Tom Danielson (USA)	Discovery Channel	s.t.
9	Manuel Beltrán (ESP)	Discovery Channel	s.t.
10	Santos González (ESP)	Phonak	s.t.

General classification after stage 11

Rank	Rider	Team	Time
1	Denis Menchov (RUS)	Rabobank	45h 07' 35"
2	Roberto Heras (ESP)	Liberty Seguros–Würth	+ 47"
3	Francisco Mancebo (ESP)	Illes Balears–Caisse d'Epargne	+ 1' 53"
4	Carlos Sastre (ESP)	Team CSC	+ 1' 57"
5	Carlos García Quesada (ESP)	Comunidad Valenciana–Elche	+ 3' 31"
6	Tom Danielson (USA)	Discovery Channel	+ 5' 03"
7	Manuel Beltrán (ESP)	Discovery Channel	+ 5' 09"
8	Juan Miguel Mercado (ESP)	Quick-Step–Innergetic	+ 5' 45"
9	Rubén Plaza (ESP)	Comunidad Valenciana–Elche	+ 5' 58"
10	Michele Scarponi (ITA)	Liberty Seguros–Würth	+ 6' 37"
