= 2005 Vuelta a España, Stage 12 to Stage 21 =

Cycling race stages

The 2005 Vuelta a España was the 60th edition of the Vuelta a España, one of cycling's Grand Tours. The Vuelta began in Granada, with an individual time trial on 27 August, and Stage 12 occurred on 8 September with a stage from Logroño. The race finished in Madrid on 18 September.

== Stage 12 ==
8 September 2005 — Logroño to Burgos, 133 km (83 mi)

Stage 12 result

Rank	Rider	Team	Time
1	Alessandro Petacchi (ITA)	Fassa Bortolo	3h 13' 36"
2	Erik Zabel (GER)	T-Mobile Team	s.t.
3	Marco Zanotti (ITA)	Liquigas–Bianchi	s.t.
4	Tom Boonen (BEL)	Quick-Step–Innergetic	s.t.
5	Heinrich Haussler (GER)	Gerolsteiner	s.t.
6	Jimmy Casper (FRA)	Cofidis	s.t.
7	Julian Dean (NZL)	Crédit Agricole	s.t.
8	Anthony Geslin (FRA)	Bouygues Télécom	s.t.
9	Arnaud Coyot (FRA)	Cofidis	s.t.
10	Tom Steels (BEL)	Davitamon–Lotto	s.t.

General classification after stage 12

Rank	Rider	Team	Time
1	Denis Menchov (RUS)	Rabobank	48h 21' 11"
2	Roberto Heras (ESP)	Liberty Seguros–Würth	+ 47"
3	Francisco Mancebo (ESP)	Illes Balears–Caisse d'Epargne	+ 1' 53"
4	Carlos Sastre (ESP)	Team CSC	+ 1' 57"
5	Carlos García Quesada (ESP)	Comunidad Valenciana–Elche	+ 3' 31"
6	Tom Danielson (USA)	Discovery Channel	+ 5' 03"
7	Manuel Beltrán (ESP)	Discovery Channel	+ 5' 09"
8	Juan Miguel Mercado (ESP)	Quick-Step–Innergetic	+ 5' 45"
9	Rubén Plaza (ESP)	Comunidad Valenciana–Elche	+ 5' 58"
10	Michele Scarponi (ITA)	Liberty Seguros–Würth	+ 6' 37"

== Stage 13 ==
9 September 2005 — Burgos to La Bien Aparecida, 196 km (122 mi)

Stage 13 result

Rank	Rider	Team	Time
1	Samuel Sánchez (ESP)	Euskaltel–Euskadi	4h 03' 40"
2	Óscar Pereiro (ESP)	Phonak	+ 4"
3	Mauricio Ardila (COL)	Davitamon–Lotto	+ 8"
4	Óscar Sevilla (ESP)	T-Mobile Team	s.t.
5	Joan Horrach (ESP)	Illes Balears–Caisse d'Epargne	+ 25"
6	Pablo Lastras (ESP)	Illes Balears–Caisse d'Epargne	+ 31"
7	David Latasa (ESP)	Comunidad Valenciana–Elche	+ 46"
8	Miguel Ángel Martín Perdiguero (ESP)	Phonak	+ 47"
9	Carlos García Quesada (ESP)	Comunidad Valenciana–Elche	+ 49"
10	Carlos Sastre (ESP)	Team CSC	s.t.

General classification after stage 13

Rank	Rider	Team	Time
1	Denis Menchov (RUS)	Rabobank	52h 25' 40"
2	Roberto Heras (ESP)	Liberty Seguros–Würth	+ 47"
3	Francisco Mancebo (ESP)	Illes Balears–Caisse d'Epargne	+ 1' 53"
4	Carlos Sastre (ESP)	Team CSC	+ 1' 57"
5	Carlos García Quesada (ESP)	Comunidad Valenciana–Elche	+ 3' 31"
6	Tom Danielson (USA)	Discovery Channel	+ 5' 47"
7	Rubén Plaza (ESP)	Comunidad Valenciana–Elche	+ 6' 00"
8	Juan Miguel Mercado (ESP)	Quick-Step–Innergetic	+ 6' 19"
9	Santos González (ESP)	Phonak	+ 6' 47"
10	Óscar Sevilla (ESP)	T-Mobile Team	+ 6' 51"

== Stage 14 ==
10 September 2005 — La Penilla to Lakes of Covadonga, 172.3 km (107.1 mi)

Stage 14 result

Rank	Rider	Team	Time
1	Eladio Jiménez (ESP)	Comunidad Valenciana–Elche	4h 25' 35"
2	Íñigo Cuesta (ESP)	Saunier Duval–Prodir	+ 1' 20"
3	Gilberto Simoni (ITA)	Lampre–Caffita	+ 1' 32"
4	Carlos Sastre (ESP)	Team CSC	+ 1' 37"
5	Denis Menchov (RUS)	Rabobank	+ 1' 44"
6	Roberto Heras (ESP)	Liberty Seguros–Würth	s.t.
7	Miguel Ángel Perdiguero (ESP)	Phonak	+ 2' 11"
8	Óscar Sevilla (ESP)	T-Mobile Team	s.t.
9	Santos González (ESP)	Phonak	+ 2' 16"
10	Francisco Mancebo (ESP)	Illes Balears–Caisse d'Epargne	+ 2' 36"

General classification after stage 14

Rank	Rider	Team	Time
1	Denis Menchov (RUS)	Rabobank	56h 53' 00"
2	Roberto Heras (ESP)	Liberty Seguros–Würth	+ 47"
3	Carlos Sastre (ESP)	Team CSC	+ 1' 50"
4	Francisco Mancebo (ESP)	Illes Balears–Caisse d'Epargne	+ 2' 45"
5	Carlos García Quesada (ESP)	Comunidad Valenciana–Elche	+ 5' 37"
6	Óscar Sevilla (ESP)	T-Mobile Team	+ 7' 18"
7	Santos González (ESP)	Phonak	+ 7' 19"
8	Rubén Plaza (ESP)	Comunidad Valenciana–Elche	+ 7' 44"
9	Tom Danielson (USA)	Discovery Channel	+ 7' 49"
10	Juan Miguel Mercado (ESP)	Quick-Step–Innergetic	+ 9' 02"

== Stage 15 ==
11 September 2005 — Cangas de Onís to Valgrande-Pajares, 191 km (119 mi)

Stage 15 result

Rank	Rider	Team	Time
1	Roberto Heras (ESP)	Liberty Seguros–Würth	4h 53' 53"
2	Samuel Sánchez (ESP)	Euskaltel–Euskadi	+ 32"
3	Javier Pascual Rodríguez (ESP)	Comunidad Valenciana–Elche	+ 46"
4	Michele Scarponi (ITA)	Liberty Seguros–Würth	+ 2' 28"
5	Mauricio Ardila (COL)	Davitamon–Lotto	+ 3' 11"
6	Carlos García Quesada (ESP)	Comunidad Valenciana–Elche	+ 3' 12"
7	Mario Aerts (BEL)	Davitamon–Lotto	+ 3' 19"
8	Óscar Pereiro (ESP)	Phonak	+ 3' 47"
9	Carlos Sastre (ESP)	Team CSC	s.t.
10	Stijn Devolder (BEL)	Discovery Channel	+ 4' 09"

General classification after stage 15

Rank	Rider	Team	Time
1	Roberto Heras (ESP)	Liberty Seguros–Würth	61h 47' 40"
2	Denis Menchov (RUS)	Rabobank	+ 4' 30"
3	Carlos Sastre (ESP)	Team CSC	+ 4' 50"
4	Francisco Mancebo (ESP)	Illes Balears–Caisse d'Epargne	+ 6' 45"
5	Carlos García Quesada (ESP)	Comunidad Valenciana–Elche	+ 8' 02"
6	Óscar Sevilla (ESP)	T-Mobile Team	+ 11' 16"
7	Rubén Plaza (ESP)	Comunidad Valenciana–Elche	+ 11' 30"
8	Tom Danielson (USA)	Discovery Channel	+ 12' 05"
9	Juan Miguel Mercado (ESP)	Quick-Step–Innergetic	+ 13' 32"
10	Santos González (ESP)	Phonak	+ 14' 20"

== Stage 16 ==
13 September 2005 — León to Valladolid, 162.5 km (101.0 mi)

Stage 16 result

Rank	Rider	Team	Time
1	Paolo Bettini (ITA)	Quick-Step–Innergetic	3h 40' 56"
2	Alessandro Petacchi (ITA)	Fassa Bortolo	s.t.
3	Miguel Ángel Perdiguero (ESP)	Phonak	s.t.
4	Joaquim Rodríguez (ESP)	Saunier Duval–Prodir	s.t.
5	Samuel Sánchez (ESP)	Euskaltel–Euskadi	s.t.
6	Mauricio Ardila (COL)	Davitamon–Lotto	s.t.
7	Erik Zabel (GER)	T-Mobile Team	s.t.
8	Pablo Lastras (ESP)	Illes Balears–Caisse d'Epargne	s.t.
9	Thomas Ziegler (GER)	Gerolsteiner	s.t.
10	Roberto Heras (ESP)	Liberty Seguros–Würth	s.t.

General classification after stage 16

Rank	Rider	Team	Time
1	Roberto Heras (ESP)	Liberty Seguros–Würth	65h 28' 36"
2	Denis Menchov (RUS)	Rabobank	+ 4' 30"
3	Carlos Sastre (ESP)	Team CSC	+ 4' 50"
4	Francisco Mancebo (ESP)	Illes Balears–Caisse d'Epargne	+ 6' 45"
5	Carlos García Quesada (ESP)	Comunidad Valenciana–Elche	+ 8' 02"
6	Óscar Sevilla (ESP)	T-Mobile Team	+ 11' 16"
7	Rubén Plaza (ESP)	Comunidad Valenciana–Elche	+ 11' 39"
8	Tom Danielson (USA)	Discovery Channel	+ 12' 15"
9	Juan Miguel Mercado (ESP)	Quick-Step–Innergetic	+ 13' 32"
10	Santos González (ESP)	Phonak	+ 14' 20"

== Stage 17 ==
14 September 2005 — El Espinar to La Granja de San Ildefonso, 165.6 km (102.9 mi)

Stage 17 result

Rank	Rider	Team	Time
1	Carlos García Quesada (ESP)	Comunidad Valenciana–Elche	3h 51' 00"
2	Francisco Mancebo (ESP)	Illes Balears–Caisse d'Epargne	+ 46"
3	Santos González (ESP)	Phonak	+ 48"
4	Mauricio Ardila (COL)	Davitamon–Lotto	+ 1' 37"
5	Rubén Plaza (ESP)	Comunidad Valenciana–Elche	s.t.
6	Óscar Sevilla (ESP)	T-Mobile Team	s.t.
7	Denis Menchov (RUS)	Rabobank	+ 1' 40"
8	Carlos Sastre (ESP)	Team CSC	s.t.
9	Roberto Heras (ESP)	Liberty Seguros–Würth	s.t.
10	Marcos Serrano (ESP)	Liberty Seguros–Würth	+ 1' 42"

General classification after stage 17

Rank	Rider	Team	Time
1	Roberto Heras (ESP)	Liberty Seguros–Würth	69h 21' 16"
2	Denis Menchov (RUS)	Rabobank	+ 4' 30"
3	Carlos Sastre (ESP)	Team CSC	+ 4' 50"
4	Francisco Mancebo (ESP)	Illes Balears–Caisse d'Epargne	+ 5' 51"
5	Carlos García Quesada (ESP)	Comunidad Valenciana–Elche	+ 6' 22"
6	Óscar Sevilla (ESP)	T-Mobile Team	+ 11' 13"
7	Rubén Plaza (ESP)	Comunidad Valenciana–Elche	+ 11' 36"
8	Santos González (ESP)	Phonak	+ 13' 28"
9	Juan Miguel Mercado (ESP)	Quick-Step–Innergetic	+ 15' 19"
10	Tom Danielson (USA)	Discovery Channel	+ 15' 39"

== Stage 18 ==
15 September 2005 — Ávila to Ávila, 197.5 km (122.7 mi)

Stage 18 result

Rank	Rider	Team	Time
1	Nicki Sørensen (DEN)	Team CSC	5h 05' 34"
2	Javier Pascual Rodríguez (ESP)	Comunidad Valenciana–Elche	s.t.
3	Vicente García Acosta (ESP)	Illes Balears–Caisse d'Epargne	+ 22"
4	Daniele Nardello (ITA)	T-Mobile Team	+ 1' 06"
5	Óscar Pereiro (ESP)	Phonak	s.t.
6	Mario Aerts (BEL)	Davitamon–Lotto	+ 1' 10"
7	Pablo Lastras (ESP)	Illes Balears–Caisse d'Epargne	s.t.
8	Gorka González (ESP)	Euskaltel–Euskadi	+ 1' 25"
9	Moisés Dueñas (ESP)	Relax–Fuenlabrada	+ 2' 32"
10	Francisco Mancebo (ESP)	Illes Balears–Caisse d'Epargne	+ 3' 55"

General classification after stage 18

Rank	Rider	Team	Time
1	Roberto Heras (ESP)	Liberty Seguros–Würth	74h 30' 48"
2	Denis Menchov (RUS)	Rabobank	+ 4' 30"
3	Carlos Sastre (ESP)	Team CSC	+ 4' 50"
4	Francisco Mancebo (ESP)	Illes Balears–Caisse d'Epargne	+ 5' 48"
5	Carlos García Quesada (ESP)	Comunidad Valenciana–Elche	+ 6' 22"
6	Óscar Sevilla (ESP)	T-Mobile Team	+ 11' 13"
7	Rubén Plaza (ESP)	Comunidad Valenciana–Elche	+ 11' 36"
8	Juan Miguel Mercado (ESP)	Quick-Step–Innergetic	+ 15' 28"
9	Tom Danielson (USA)	Discovery Channel	+ 15' 50"
10	Mauricio Ardila (COL)	Davitamon–Lotto	+ 15' 53"

== Stage 19 ==
16 September 2005 — San Martín de Valdeiglesias to Alcobendas, 142.9 km (88.8 mi)

Stage 19 result

Rank	Rider	Team	Time
1	Heinrich Haussler (AUS)	Gerolsteiner	3h 20' 26"
2	Martin Elmiger (SUI)	Phonak	s.t.
3	David Latasa (ESP)	Comunidad Valenciana–Elche	s.t.
4	Juan Manuel Fuentes (ESP)	Lampre–Caffita	+ 10"
5	Constantino Zaballa (ESP)	Saunier Duval–Prodir	+ 30"
6	Pablo Lastras (ESP)	Illes Balears–Caisse d'Epargne	+ 43"
7	Jose Miguel Elias (ESP)	Relax–Fuenlabrada	+ 45"
8	Linus Gerdemann (GER)	Team CSC	+ 50"
9	Roberto Laiseka (ESP)	Euskaltel–Euskadi	+ 54"
10	Fabio Baldato (ITA)	Fassa Bortolo	+ 2' 16"

General classification after stage 19

Rank	Rider	Team	Time
1	Roberto Heras (ESP)	Liberty Seguros–Würth	78h 06' 39"
2	Denis Menchov (RUS)	Rabobank	+ 4' 30"
3	Carlos Sastre (ESP)	Team CSC	+ 4' 50"
4	Francisco Mancebo (ESP)	Illes Balears–Caisse d'Epargne	+ 5' 48"
5	Carlos García Quesada (ESP)	Comunidad Valenciana–Elche	+ 6' 22"
6	Óscar Sevilla (ESP)	T-Mobile Team	+ 11' 13"
7	Rubén Plaza (ESP)	Comunidad Valenciana–Elche	+ 11' 36"
8	Juan Miguel Mercado (ESP)	Quick-Step–Innergetic	+ 15' 28"
9	Tom Danielson (USA)	Discovery Channel	+ 15' 50"
10	Mauricio Ardila (COL)	Davitamon–Lotto	+ 15' 53"

== Stage 20 ==
17 September 2005 — Guadalajara to Alcalá de Henares, 38.9 km (24.2 mi) (ITT)

Stage 20 result

Rank	Rider	Team	Time
1	Rubén Plaza (ESP)	Comunidad Valenciana–Elche	41' 31"
2	Roberto Heras (ESP)	Liberty Seguros–Würth	s.t.
3	Carlos Sastre (ESP)	Team CSC	+ 4"
4	Denis Menchov (RUS)	Rabobank	+ 6"
5	Francisco Mancebo (ESP)	Illes Balears–Caisse d'Epargne	+ 10"
6	Víctor Hugo Peña (COL)	Phonak	+ 23"
7	Stijn Devolder (BEL)	Discovery Channel	+ 30"
8	Óscar Pereiro (ESP)	Phonak	+ 33"
9	Tom Danielson (USA)	Discovery Channel	+ 48"
10	Christian Vande Velde (USA)	Team CSC	+ 1' 07"

General classification after stage 20

Rank	Rider	Team	Time
1	Roberto Heras (ESP)	Liberty Seguros–Würth	78h 48' 10"
2	Denis Menchov (RUS)	Rabobank	+ 4' 36"
3	Carlos Sastre (ESP)	Team CSC	+ 4' 54"
4	Francisco Mancebo (ESP)	Illes Balears–Caisse d'Epargne	+ 5' 58"
5	Carlos García Quesada (ESP)	Comunidad Valenciana–Elche	+ 8' 06"
6	Rubén Plaza (ESP)	Comunidad Valenciana–Elche	+ 11' 36"
7	Óscar Sevilla (ESP)	T-Mobile Team	+ 13' 22"
8	Tom Danielson (USA)	Discovery Channel	+ 16' 38"
9	Mauricio Ardila (COL)	Davitamon–Lotto	+ 18' 19"
10	Juan Miguel Mercado (ESP)	Quick-Step–Innergetic	+ 18' 31"

== Stage 21 ==
18 September 2005 — Madrid to Madrid, 136.5 km (84.8 mi)

Stage 21 result

Rank	Rider	Team	Time
1	Alessandro Petacchi (ITA)	Fassa Bortolo	3h 34' 41"
2	Erik Zabel (GER)	T-Mobile Team	s.t.
3	Heinrich Haussler (AUS)	Gerolsteiner	s.t.
4	Samuel Sánchez (ESP)	Euskaltel–Euskadi	s.t.
5	Jimmy Casper (FRA)	Cofidis	s.t.
6	Gert Steegmans (BEL)	Davitamon–Lotto	s.t.
7	Bram de Groot (NED)	Rabobank	s.t.
8	Michael Barry (CAN)	Discovery Channel	s.t.
9	Arnaud Coyot (FRA)	Cofidis	s.t.
10	René Haselbacher (AUT)	Gerolsteiner	s.t.

General classification after stage 21

Rank	Rider	Team	Time
1	Roberto Heras (ESP)	Liberty Seguros–Würth	82h 22' 55"
2	Denis Menchov (RUS)	Rabobank	+ 4' 36"
3	Carlos Sastre (ESP)	Team CSC	+ 4' 54"
4	Francisco Mancebo (ESP)	Illes Balears–Caisse d'Epargne	+ 5' 58"
5	Carlos García Quesada (ESP)	Comunidad Valenciana–Elche	+ 8' 06"
6	Rubén Plaza (ESP)	Comunidad Valenciana–Elche	+ 11' 36"
7	Óscar Sevilla (ESP)	T-Mobile Team	+ 13' 22"
8	Tom Danielson (USA)	Discovery Channel	+ 16' 38"
9	Mauricio Ardila (COL)	Davitamon–Lotto	+ 18' 15"
10	Juan Miguel Mercado (ESP)	Quick-Step–Innergetic	+ 18' 31"
