= 2006 Vuelta a Andalucía =

Race details
- Dates: 12–16 February 2006
- Stages: 5
- Distance: 827.4 km (514.1 mi)
- Winning time: 20h 08' 23"

Results
	Winner	Carlos García Quesada (ESP)
	Second	Rodrigo García Rena (ESP)
	Third	Adolfo García Quesada (ESP)

The 2006 Vuelta a Andalucía was held on 12 to 16 February 2006, the 52nd running of this road bicycle race. It started in Antequera and finished in Seville, and was won by Carlos García Quesada.

== Teams ==
Fourteen teams of up to seven riders started the race:

- Andalucía–Paul Versan
- Team Milram
- Quick-Step–Innergetic
- Rabobank
- Unibet.com
- T-Mobile Team
- Agritubel
- Discovery Channel
- Saunier Duval–Prodir
- Comunidad Valenciana
- Kaiku
- Relax–GAM
- Euskaltel–Euskadi
- 3 Molinos Resort

== General classification ==
Final general classification

Rank	Rider	Time
1	Carlos García Quesada (ESP)	20h 08' 23"
2	Rodrigo García Rena (ESP)	s.t.
3	Adolfo García Quesada (ESP)	+ 7"
4	Iñaki Isasi (ESP)	+ 15"
5	Luis Pasamontes (ESP)	+ 18"
6	José Adrián Bonilla (CRC)	s.t.
7	Oliver Zaugg (SUI)	s.t.
8	Manuel Lloret (ESP)	+ 26' 19"
9	Manuel Calvente (ESP)	+ 27' 31"
10	Manuel Beltrán (ESP)	+ 27' 35"
