= Vuelta a Castilla y León =

Cycling Competition in Spain

Race details
- Date: Late March
- Region: Castile and León
- English name: Tour of Castile and León
- Local name: Vuelta a Castilla y León (in Spanish)
- Discipline: Road
- Competition: UCI Europe Tour
- Type: Stage race (1985-2023); One-day race (2024-current)
- Web site: www.vueltacastillayleon.es

History
- First edition: 1985
- Editions: 40 (as of 2026)
- First winner: Jesús Blanco (ESP)
- Most wins: Alberto Contador (ESP) (3 wins)
- Most recent: Guillermo Thomas Silva (URU)

The Vuelta Ciclista a Castilla y León is a professional road bicycle stage race held in Castile and León, Spain. Since 2005, it has been a part of the UCI Europe Tour. Since 2024, the race is held as a single day event and is known as Clásica Castilla y León (translation: Castile and León Classic).

== Past winners ==
Year	Country	Rider	Team
1985	Spain	Jesús Blanco	Teka
1986	Spain	Alfonso Gutiérrez	Teka
1987	Spain	Alfonso Gutiérrez	Teka
1988	West Germany	Raimund Dietzen	Teka
1989	Spain	Federico Echave	B.H. Sport
1991	Spain	José Rodríguez García	Seur
1992	Russia	Asiat Saitov	Kelme–Don Cafe
1993	Spain	Miguel Induráin	Banesto
1994	Spain	Melcior Mauri	Banesto
1995	Spain	Santiago Blanco	Banesto
1996	Italy	Andrea Peron	Motorola
1997	Spain	Ángel Casero	Banesto
1998	Spain	Aitor Garmendia	Banesto
1999	Italy	Leonardo Piepoli	Banesto
2000	Spain	Francisco Mancebo	Banesto
2001	Spain	Marcos Serrano	iBanesto.com
2002	Spain	Juan Miguel Mercado	iBanesto.com
2003	Spain	Francisco Mancebo	iBanesto.com
2004	Spain	Koldo Gil	Liberty Seguros
2005	Spain	Carlos García Quesada	Comunidad Valenciana–Elche
2006	Kazakhstan	Alexander Vinokourov	Liberty Seguros–Würth
2007	Spain	Alberto Contador	Discovery Channel
2008	Spain	Alberto Contador	Astana
2009	United States	Levi Leipheimer	Astana
2010	Spain	Alberto Contador	Astana
2011	Spain	Xavier Tondo	Movistar Team
2012	Spain	Javier Moreno	Movistar Team
2013	Spain	Rubén Plaza	Movistar Team
2014	Spain	David Belda	Burgos BH–Castilla y León
2015	France	Pierre Rolland	Team Europcar
2016	Spain	Alejandro Valverde	Movistar Team
2017	France	Jonathan Hivert	Direct Énergie
2018	Spain	Rubén Plaza	Israel Cycling Academy
2019	Italy	Davide Cimolai	Israel Cycling Academy
2020	No race due to the COVID-19 pandemic		
2021	France	Matis Louvel	Arkéa–Samsic
2022	Great Britain	Simon Yates	Team BikeExchange–Jayco
2023	Argentina	Eduardo Sepúlveda	Lotto–Dstny
2024	Australia	Caleb Ewan	Team Jayco–AlUla
2025	Spain	Haimar Etxeberria	Equipo Kern Pharma
2026	Uruguay	Guillermo Thomas Silva	XDS Astana Team
