= 2005 Vuelta a Castilla y León =

Race details
- Dates: 27 April–1 May 2005
- Stages: 5
- Distance: 681.8 km (423.7 mi)
- Winning time: 17h 03' 31"

Results
	Winner	Carlos García Quesada (ESP)
	Second	Francisco Pérez (ESP)
	Third	David Blanco (ESP)

The 2005 Vuelta a Castilla y León was the 20th edition of the Vuelta a Castilla y León cycle race and was held on 27 April to 1 May 2005. The race started in Astorga and finished in La Covatilla. The race was won by Carlos García Quesada.

== Teams ==
Twenty-three teams of up to eight riders started the race:

- Rabobank
- Euskaltel–Euskadi
- Team CSC
- Discovery Channel
- Liberty Seguros–Würth
- Lampre–Caffita
- Illes Balears–Caisse d'Epargne
- Phonak
- Cofidis
- T-Mobile Team
- Gerolsteiner
- Quick-Step–Innergetic
- Saunier Duval–Prodir
- Fassa Bortolo
- Davitamon–Lotto
- Liquigas–Bianchi
- Bouygues Télécom
- Crédit Agricole
- Française des Jeux
- Domina Vacanze
- Relax–Fuenlabrada
- Comunidad Valenciana–Elche
- Kaiku

== General classification ==
Final general classification

Rank	Rider	Time
1	Carlos García Quesada (ESP)	17h 03' 31"
2	Francisco Pérez (ESP)	+ 50"
3	David Blanco (ESP)	+ 1' 08"
4	Eladio Jiménez (ESP)	+ 1' 21"
5	Javier Rodríguez (ESP)	+ 1' 56"
6	Jorge Ferrío Luque (ESP)	+ 2' 03"
7	Stéphane Goubert (FRA)	+ 2' 07"
8	Bruno Miguel Castanheira (POR)	+ 2' 33"
9	Mikel Astarloza (ESP)	+ 2' 36"
10	Danail Petrov (BUL)	+ 2' 53"
