= Adolfo García Quesada =

Spanish cyclist (born 1979)

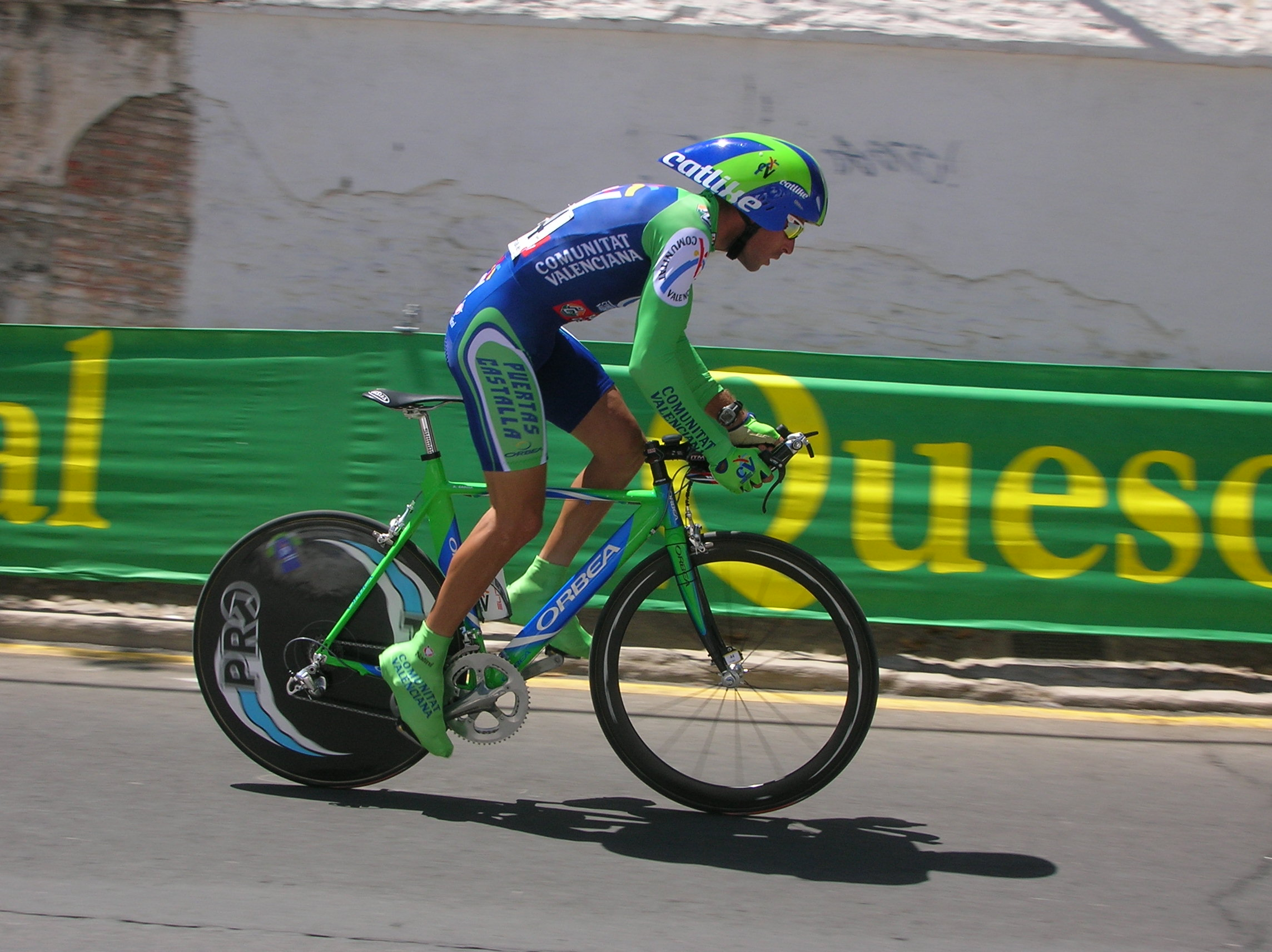

Personal information
- Born: 27 September 1979 (age 47) Granada, Spain

Cycling career
- Sport: Cycling
- Current team: Retired
- Discipline: Road
- Role: Rider

Professional teams
- 2001–2002: iBanesto.com
- 2003–2005: Kelme–Costa Blanca
- 2006: Andalucía–Paul Versan

Adolfo García Quesada (born 27 September 1979 in Granada) is a Spanish former cyclist. His brother, Carlos García Quesada also competed professionally. He rode in the 2003 Giro d'Italia, finishing in 18th place and the 2005 Vuelta a España for 35th position.

== Major results ==
2000
1st Stage 5 Vuelta a Navarra
2nd Overall Circuito Montañés
2002
1st Stage 5 Volta a Portugal
2nd Clásica a los Puertos de Guadarrama
2003
1st Stage 1 Vuelta a Burgos
2004
1st Stage 5 Volta a Portugal
2005
1st Overall Vuelta a Asturias
3rd Prueba Villafranca de Ordizia
3rd Overall Volta a Portugal

1st Stage 8

2006
1st Stage 5 Volta a Catalunya
2nd GP Llodio
3rd Overall Vuelta a Andalucía

1st Stage 1

3rd Clásica de Almería
