= 2007 Vuelta a Andalucía =

Race details
- Dates: 18–22 February 2007
- Stages: 5
- Distance: 823.2 km (511.5 mi)
- Winning time: 20h 20' 55"

Results
	Winner	Óscar Freire (ESP)
	Second	Dario Cioni (ITA)
	Third	Tadej Valjavec (SLO)

The 2007 Vuelta a Andalucía was the 53rd edition of the Vuelta a Andalucía cycle race and was held on 18 February to 22 February 2007. The race started in Otura and finished in Antequera. The race was won by Óscar Freire.

== Teams ==
Fifteen teams of seven riders started the race:

- Unibet.com
- Lampre–Fondital
- Quick-Step–Innergetic
- Rabobank
- Predictor–Lotto
- T-Mobile Team
- Agritubel
- Skil–Shimano
- Andalucía–Cajasur
- Karpin–Galicia
- Fuerteventura–Canarias
- Relax–GAM
- Saunier Duval–Prodir
- Euskaltel–Euskadi
- Caisse d'Epargne

== General classification ==
Final general classification

Rank	Rider	Time
1	Óscar Freire (ESP)	20h 20' 55"
2	Dario Cioni (ITA)	+ 1"
3	Tadej Valjavec (SLO)	+ 2"
4	Francisco Ventoso (ESP)	s.t.
5	Koldo Fernández (ESP)	+ 6"
6	Francisco Mancebo (ESP)	s.t.
7	Roger Hammond (GBR)	s.t.
8	Luis Pasamontes (ESP)	s.t.
9	Linus Gerdemann (GER)	s.t.
10	Rodrigo García Rena (ESP)	s.t.
