= 2002 Vuelta a Castilla y León =

Race details
- Dates: 2–6 May 2002
- Stages: 5
- Distance: 814.3 km (506.0 mi)
- Winning time: 20h 37' 33"

Results
	Winner	Juan Miguel Mercado (ESP)
	Second	Joan Horrach (ESP)
	Third	Leonardo Piepoli (ITA)

The 2002 Vuelta a Castilla y León was the 17th edition of the Vuelta a Castilla y León cycle race and was held on 2 May to 6 May 2002. The race started in Ávila and finished in Benavente. The race was won by Juan Miguel Mercado.

== General classification ==
Final general classification

Rank	Rider	Time
1	Juan Miguel Mercado (ESP)	20h 37' 33"
2	Joan Horrach (ESP)	+ 26"
3	Leonardo Piepoli (ITA)	+ 36"
4	Isidro Nozal (ESP)	+ 1' 11"
5	Francisco Mancebo (ESP)	+ 1' 22"
6	Óscar Sevilla (ESP)	+ 1' 28"
7	David Bernabeu (ESP)	+ 1' 34"
8	Vladimir Karpets (RUS)	+ 1' 36"
9	Pedro Cardoso (POR)	+ 1' 59"
10	Josep Jufré (ESP)	+ 2' 24"
