= 1997 Vuelta a Castilla y León =

Race details
- Dates: 4–8 August 1997
- Stages: 5
- Distance: 720 km (447.4 mi)
- Winning time: 18h 48' 27"

Results
| | Winner | Ángel Casero (ESP) |
| | Second | Laurent Jalabert (FRA) |
| | Third | Udo Bölts (GER) |

The 1997 Vuelta a Castilla y León was the 12th edition of the Vuelta a Castilla y León cycle race and was held on 4 August to 8 August 1997. The race started in Valladolid and finished in Aranda de Duero. The race was won by Ángel Casero.

== General classification ==
Final general classification

| Rank | Rider | Time |
|---|---|---|
| 1 | Ángel Casero (ESP) | 18h 48' 27" |
| 2 | Laurent Jalabert (FRA) | + 1' 42" |
| 3 | Udo Bölts (GER) | + 1' 55" |
| 4 | Georg Totschnig (AUT) | + 1' 56" |
| 5 | Francisco Cabello (ESP) | + 2' 24" |
| 6 | Melcior Mauri (ESP) | + 2' 39" |
| 7 | Javier Pascual Rodríguez (ESP) | + 2' 42" |
| 8 | Juan Carlos Domínguez (ESP) | + 2' 51" |
| 9 | Francisque Teyssier (FRA) | + 2' 53" |
| 10 | Manuel Beltrán (ESP) | + 3' 08" |
