= 2018 Vuelta a Castilla y León =

Race details
- Dates: 20 April–22 April 2018
- Stages: 3
- Distance: 541.3 km (336.3 mi)
- Winning time: 12h 51' 07"

Results
Jersey awarded to the overall winner	Winner	Rubén Plaza (ESP)	(Israel Cycling Academy)
	Second	Carlos Barbero (ESP)	(Movistar Team)
	Third	Eduard Prades (ESP)	(Euskadi-Murias)
Jersey awarded to the points classification winner	Points	Carlos Barbero (ESP)	(Movistar Team)
Jersey awarded to the mountains classification winner	Mountains	Daniel Whitehouse (UK)	(Interpro Stradalli)
Jersey awarded to the sprints classification winner	Sprints	Marcos Jurado (ESP)	(Efapel)
	Team	(United States) Rally Cycling	

The 2018 Vuelta a Castilla y León was the 33rd edition of the Vuelta a Castilla y León cycle race and was held on 20 April to 22 April 2018. The race started in Alba de Tormes and finished in Ávila. The race was won by Rubén Plaza.

== General classification ==
Final general classification

Rank	Rider	Time
1	Rubén Plaza (ESP)	12h 51' 07"
2	Carlos Barbero (ESP)	+ 35"
3	Eduard Prades (ESP)	+ 42"
4	Colin Joyce (USA)	+ 55"
5	Diego Rubio (ESP)	s.t.
6	Mario González (ESP)	s.t.
7	Dmitry Strakhov (RUS)	+ 56"
8	Daniel Mestre (POR)	+ 57"
9	Sergio Higuita (COL)	+ 1' 00"
10	Alex Aranburu (ESP)	s.t.
