= 2005 Vuelta a España =

60th edition of the Vuelta a España cycling race

- Overview of the stages

Race details
- Dates: 27 August – 18 September
- Stages: 21
- Distance: 3,192 km (1,983 mi)
- Winning time: 82h 27' 31"

Results
Jersey awarded to the overall winner	Winner	Roberto Heras (ESP)	(Liberty Seguros–Würth)
	Second	Denis Menchov (RUS)	(Rabobank)
	Third	Carlos Sastre (ESP)	(Team CSC)
Jersey awarded to the points classification winner	Points	Alessandro Petacchi (ITA)	(Fassa Bortolo)
Jersey awarded to the mountains classification winner	Mountains	Joaquim Rodríguez (ESP)	(Saunier Duval–Prodir)
Jersey awarded to the combination classification winner	Combination	Denis Menchov (RUS)	(Rabobank)
	Team	Comunidad Valenciana–Elche	

The 2005 Vuelta a España was a three-week cycling race that took place in Spain and Andorra between 27 August and 18 September. It was the 60th edition of the Vuelta a España and the third and final grand tour of the 2005 men's road cycling season.

Roberto Heras was the original champion but the win was awarded to Russian Denis Menchov after Heras tested positive in a doping test. Heras made an appeal through the Spanish courts, which ruled in his favour in June 2011 and this decision was upheld in the Spanish supreme court in December 2012; the Spanish cycling federation was not yet sure how to act, but said that the most likely result is that Heras will be reinstated.

The points classification was won by Alessandro Petacchi from Italy, the mountains classification was won by Joaquim Rodríguez from Spain and the combination classification was won by Denis Menchov. Comunidad Valenciana–Elche was the winner of the team ranking.

== Teams and riders ==
In addition to the 20 ProTour teams, Comunidad Valenciana–Elche and Relax Fuenlabrada were given wildcard entries.

== Route ==
List of stages
Stage	Date	Course	Distance	Type	Winner
1	27 August	Granada to Granada	7 km (4 mi)	Individual time trial	Denis Menchov (RUS)
2	28 August	Granada to Córdoba	189.3 km (118 mi)		~~Leonardo Bertagnolli (ITA)~~
3	29 August	Córdoba to Puertollano	153.3 km (95 mi)		Alessandro Petacchi (ITA)
4	30 August	Ciudad Real to Argamasilla de Alba	232.3 km (144 mi)		Alessandro Petacchi (ITA)
5	31 August	Alcázar de San Juan to Cuenca	176 km (109 mi)		Thor Hushovd (NOR)
6	1 September	Cuenca to Valdelinares	217 km (135 mi)		Roberto Heras (ESP)
7	2 September	Teruel to Vinaròs	212.5 km (132 mi)		Max van Heeswijk (NED)
8	3 September	Tarragona to Lloret de Mar	189 km (117 mi)		Alessandro Petacchi (ITA)
9	4 September	Lloret de Mar to Lloret de Mar	48 km (30 mi)	Individual time trial	Denis Menchov (RUS)
10	5 September	La Vall d'en Bas to Ordino-Arcalis (Andorra)	206.3 km (128 mi)		Francisco Mancebo (ESP)
11	6 September	Andorra to Cerler	186.6 km (116 mi)		Roberto Laiseka (ESP)
	7 September			Rest day	
12	8 September	Logroño to Burgos	133 km (83 mi)		Alessandro Petacchi (ITA)
13	9 September	Burgos to La Bien Aparecida	196 km (122 mi)		Samuel Sánchez (ESP)
14	10 September	La Penilla to Lakes of Covadonga	172.3 km (107 mi)		Eladio Jiménez (ESP)
15	11 September	Cangas de Onís to Valgrande-Pajares	191 km (119 mi)		Roberto Heras (ESP)
	12 September			Rest day	
16	13 September	León to Valladolid	162.5 km (101 mi)		Paolo Bettini (ITA)
17	14 September	El Espinar to La Granja de San Ildefonso	165.6 km (103 mi)		Carlos García (ESP)
18	15 September	Ávila to Ávila	197.5 km (123 mi)		Nicki Sørensen (DEN)
19	16 September	San Martín de Valdeiglesias to Alcobendas	142.9 km (89 mi)		Heinrich Haussler (GER)
20	17 September	Guadalajara to Alcalá de Henares	38.9 km (24 mi)	Individual time trial	Rubén Plaza (ESP)
21	18 September	Madrid to Madrid	136.5 km (85 mi)		Alessandro Petacchi (ITA)
	Total		3,239 km (2,013 mi)		

== Jersey Progress ==
Stage	Winner	General classification	Points classification	Mountains classification	Combination classification	Team classification
1	Denis Menchov	Denis Menchov	Denis Menchov	Rik Verbrugghe	Denis Menchov	Team CSC
2	~~Leonardo Bertagnolli~~	Bradley McGee	Bradley McGee	~~Leonardo Bertagnolli~~	~~Leonardo Bertagnolli~~	Liberty Seguros–Würth
3	Alessandro Petacchi	Bradley McGee	Bradley McGee	Joaquim Rodríguez	~~Leonardo Bertagnolli~~	Liberty Seguros–Würth
4	Alessandro Petacchi	Bradley McGee	Alessandro Petacchi	Joaquim Rodríguez	Bradley McGee	Liberty Seguros–Würth
5	Thor Hushovd	Bradley McGee	Thor Hushovd	Joaquim Rodríguez	Bradley McGee	Liberty Seguros–Würth
6	Roberto Heras	Roberto Heras	Thor Hushovd	Roberto Heras	Roberto Heras	Liberty Seguros–Würth
7	Max van Heeswijk	Roberto Heras	Thor Hushovd	Eladio Jiménez	Roberto Heras	Liberty Seguros–Würth
8	Alessandro Petacchi	Roberto Heras	Thor Hushovd	Eladio Jiménez	Roberto Heras	Liberty Seguros–Würth
9	Denis Menchov	Denis Menchov	Thor Hushovd	Eladio Jiménez	Denis Menchov	Comunidad Valenciana
10	Francisco Mancebo	Denis Menchov	Thor Hushovd	Eladio Jiménez	Denis Menchov	Comunidad Valenciana
11	Roberto Laiseka	Denis Menchov	Denis Menchov	Joaquim Rodríguez	Denis Menchov	Comunidad Valenciana
12	Alessandro Petacchi	Denis Menchov	Denis Menchov	Joaquim Rodríguez	Denis Menchov	Comunidad Valenciana
13	Samuel Sánchez	Denis Menchov	Denis Menchov	Joaquim Rodríguez	Denis Menchov	Comunidad Valenciana
14	Eladio Jiménez	Denis Menchov	Denis Menchov	Joaquim Rodríguez	Denis Menchov	Comunidad Valenciana
15	Roberto Heras	Roberto Heras	Roberto Heras	Joaquim Rodríguez	Roberto Heras	Comunidad Valenciana
16	Paolo Bettini	Roberto Heras	Roberto Heras	Joaquim Rodríguez	Roberto Heras	Comunidad Valenciana
17	Carlos García Quesada	Roberto Heras	Roberto Heras	Joaquim Rodríguez	Roberto Heras	Comunidad Valenciana
18	Nicki Sørensen	Roberto Heras	Roberto Heras	Joaquim Rodríguez	Roberto Heras	Comunidad Valenciana
19	Heinrich Haussler	Roberto Heras	Roberto Heras	Joaquim Rodríguez	Roberto Heras	Comunidad Valenciana
20	Rubén Plaza	Roberto Heras	Roberto Heras	Joaquim Rodríguez	Roberto Heras	Comunidad Valenciana
21	Alessandro Petacchi	Roberto Heras	Alessandro Petacchi	Joaquim Rodríguez	Roberto Heras	Comunidad Valenciana
Final		Roberto Heras	Alessandro Petacchi	Joaquim Rodríguez	Roberto Heras	Comunidad Valenciana

== General Standings ==
	Cyclist	Team	Time
1	Roberto Heras	Liberty Seguros	82h 22' 55"
2	Denis Menchov	Rabobank	+ 4' 36"
3	Carlos Sastre	Team CSC	+ 4' 54"
4	Francisco Mancebo	Illes Balears–Caisse d'Epargne	+ 5' 58"
5	Carlos García Quesada	Comunitat Valenciana-Elche	+ 8' 06"
6	Rubén Plaza	Comunitat Valenciana-Elche	+ 11' 36"
7	Óscar Sevilla	T-Mobile Team	+ 13' 22"
8	~~Tom Danielson~~	~~Discovery Channel~~	~~+ 16' 38"~~
9	Mauricio Ardila	Davitamon–Lotto	+ 18' 15"
10	Juan Miguel Mercado	Quick-Step–Innergetic	+ 18' 31"
11	Samuel Sánchez	Euskaltel–Euskadi	+ 20' 12"
12	Michele Scarponi	Liberty Seguros	+ 31' 44"
13	David Blanco	Comunitat Valenciana-Elche	+ 34' 57"
14	Koos Moerenhout	Davitamon–Lotto	+ 35' 03"
15	Josep Jufré	Relax	+ 35' 33"
16	Mario Aerts	Davitamon–Lotto	+ 36' 18"
17	Daniel Atienza	Cofidis	+ 36' 23"
18	Unai Osa	Illes Balears–Caisse d'Epargne	+ 37' 14"
19	Marcos Serrano	Liberty Seguros	+ 38' 37"
20	Pablo Lastras	Illes Balears–Caisse d'Epargne	+ 40' 45"

== KOM Classification ==
	Cyclist	Team
1	Joaquim Rodríguez	Saunier Duval–Prodir

== Points Classification ==
	Cyclist	Team
1	Alessandro Petacchi	Fassa Bortolo

== Best Team ==
	Team	Country
1	Comunitat Valenciana-Puertas Castalia	Spain
