= 1998 Trofeo Foral de Navarra =

Race details
- Dates: 3 April 1998
- Stages: 1
- Distance: 186 km (115.6 mi)
- Winning time: 4h 48' 51"

Results
	Winner	Francisco Mancebo (ESP)
	Second	Stefano Garzelli (ITA)
	Third	Davide Rebellin (ITA)

The 1998 Trofeo Foral de Navarra was the 45th edition of the GP Miguel Induráin cycle race and was held on 3 April 1998. The race was won by Francisco Mancebo.

== General classification ==
Final general classification

Rank	Rider	Time
1	Francisco Mancebo (ESP)	4h 48' 51"
2	Stefano Garzelli (ITA)	+ 0"
3	Davide Rebellin (ITA)	+ 0"
4	Roberto Heras (ESP)	+ 0"
5	Dario Frigo (ITA)	+ 0"
6	José Luis Arrieta (ESP)	+ 0"
7	Daniel Clavero (ESP)	+ 0"
8	David Etxebarria (ESP)	+ 0"
9	José Manuel Uría (ESP)	+ 0"
10	Massimo Donati (ITA)	+ 0"
