= 2004 Volta a la Comunitat Valenciana =

Race details
- Dates: 24–28 February 2004
- Stages: 5
- Distance: 818.4 km (508.5 mi)
- Winning time: 20h 04' 45"

Results
	Winner	Alejandro Valverde (ESP)	(Comunidad Valenciana–Kelme)
	Second	Antonio Colom (ESP)	(Illes Balears–Banesto)
	Third	David Blanco (ESP)	(Comunidad Valenciana–Kelme)

The 2004 Volta a la Comunitat Valenciana was the 62nd edition of the Volta a la Comunitat Valenciana road cycling stage race, which was held from 24 to 28 February 2004. The race started in Xàbia and finished in Valencia. The race was won by Alejandro Valverde of the Comunidad Valenciana–Kelme team.

== General classification ==
Final general classification

Rank	Rider	Team	Time
1	Alejandro Valverde (ESP)	Comunidad Valenciana–Kelme	20h 04' 45"
2	Antonio Colom (ESP)	Illes Balears–Banesto	+ 9"
3	David Blanco (ESP)	Comunidad Valenciana–Kelme	+ 22"
4	Leonardo Piepoli (ITA)	Saunier Duval–Prodir	+ 25"
5	Alex Zülle (SUI)	Phonak	+ 30"
6	Rubén Plaza (ESP)	Comunidad Valenciana–Kelme	+ 32"
7	Denis Menchov (RUS)	Illes Balears–Banesto	+ 34"
8	Koldo Gil (ESP)	Liberty Seguros	+ 36"
9	Íñigo Cuesta (ESP)	Cofidis	+ 38"
10	Bingen Fernández (ESP)	Cofidis	+ 42"
