= 2007 Volta a la Comunitat Valenciana =

Race details
- Dates: 27 February–3 March 2007
- Stages: 5
- Distance: 774.1 km (481.0 mi)
- Winning time: 18h 07' 02"

Results
	Winner	Alejandro Valverde (ESP)	(Caisse d'Epargne)
	Second	Tadej Valjavec (SLO)	(Lampre–Fondital)
	Third	Fränk Schleck (LUX)	(Team CSC)

The 2007 Volta a la Comunitat Valenciana was the 65th edition of the Volta a la Comunitat Valenciana road cycling stage race, which was held from 27 February to 3 March 2007. The race started in Alzira and finished in Valencia. The race was won by Alejandro Valverde of the Caisse d'Epargne team.

== General classification ==
Final general classification

Rank	Rider	Team	Time
1	Alejandro Valverde (ESP)	Caisse d'Epargne	18h 07' 02"
2	Tadej Valjavec (SLO)	Lampre–Fondital	+ 8"
3	Fränk Schleck (LUX)	Team CSC	+ 12"
4	Janez Brajkovič (SLO)	Discovery Channel	+ 14"
5	José Miguel Elías (ESP)	Relax–GAM	+ 16"
6	Thomas Voeckler (FRA)	Bouygues Télécom	+ 17"
7	Luis León Sánchez (ESP)	Caisse d'Epargne	+ 19"
8	Patxi Vila (ESP)	Lampre–Fondital	+ 20"
9	Emanuele Sella (ITA)	Ceramica Panaria–Navigare	+ 21"
10	Mikel Astarloza (ESP)	Euskaltel–Euskadi	+ 23"
