= 2003 Vuelta a Castilla y León =

Race details
- Dates: 20–24 May 2003
- Stages: 5
- Distance: 707.8 km (439.8 mi)
- Winning time: 17h 22' 17"

Results
	Winner	Francisco Mancebo (ESP)
	Second	Denis Menchov (RUS)
	Third	Alex Zülle (SUI)

The 2003 Vuelta a Castilla y León was the 18th edition of the Vuelta a Castilla y León cycle race and was held on 20 May to 24 May 2003. The race started in San Andrés del Rabanedo and finished in Ávila. The race was won by Francisco Mancebo.

== Teams ==
Eighteen teams of up to eight riders started the race:

- iBanesto.com
- Phonak
- ONCE–Eroski
- De Nardi–Colpack
- Kelme–Costa Blanca
- Vini Caldirola–So.di
- Euskaltel–Euskadi
- Brioches La Boulangère
- Labarca 2–Cafés Baqué
- AG2R Prévoyance
- Paternina–Costa de Almería
- Crédit Agricole
- Colchon Relax–Fuenlabrada
- BigMat–Auber 93
- Carvalhelhos–Boavista
- 05 Orbitel
- Barbot–Torrie
- Lokomotiv

== General classification ==
Final general classification

Rank	Rider	Time
1	Francisco Mancebo (ESP)	17h 22' 17"
2	Denis Menchov (RUS)	s.t.
3	Alex Zülle (SUI)	+ 27"
4	Alberto Contador (ESP)	+ 42"
5	David Arroyo (ESP)	s.t.
6	José Antonio Garrido (ESP)	+ 52"
7	Didier Rous (FRA)	+ 56"
8	Íñigo Chaurreau (ESP)	+ 1' 04"
9	Nácor Burgos (ESP)	+ 1' 07"
10	Cédric Fragniere (SUI)	+ 1' 09"
