= 2004 Tour of Britain =

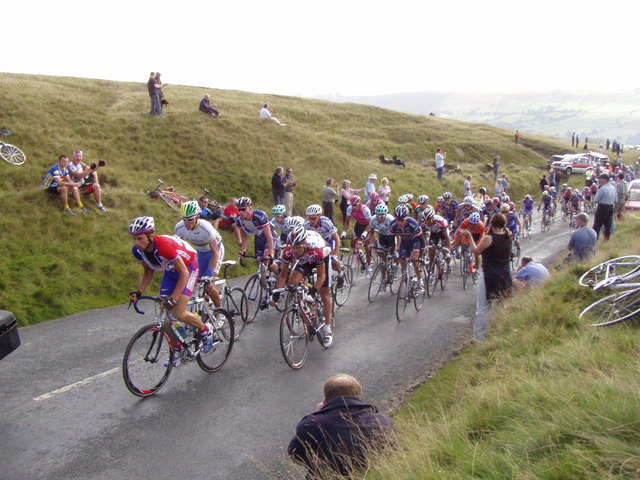
The 2004 Tour of Britain passes Sabden, Lancashire

The 2004 Tour of Britain was the first edition of the latest version of the Tour of Britain. It took place over five days in early September 2004, organised by SweetSpot in collaboration with British Cycling, and was the first Tour of Britain to be held since 1999. Sponsored by the organisers of London's 2012 Olympics bid, it attracted teams such as T-Mobile Team and U.S. Postal Service. It was designated a 2.3 category race on the Union Cycliste Internationale (UCI) calendar.

The tour climaxed with a 45 miles (72 km) criterium in London, where an estimated 100,000 spectators saw a long break by Bradley Wiggins last until the penultimate lap, before Enrico Degano of Team Barloworld took the sprint on the line. The Colombian Mauricio Ardila, of Chocolade Jacques, won the race overall.

== Stages ==
Stage	Date	Start	Finish	Distance	Winner	Team	Time
1	1 September 2004	Manchester	Manchester	207 km	Stefano Zanini (ITA)	Quick-Step–Davitamon	5h 01'23"
2	2 September 2004	Leeds	Sheffield	172 km	Mauricio Ardila (COL)	Chocolade Jacques–Topsport Vlaanderen	4h 26'26"
3	3 September 2004	Bakewell	Nottingham	192 km	Tom Boonen (BEL)	Quick-Step–Davitamon	4h 30'55"
4	4 September 2004	Newport	Newport	160 km	Mauricio Ardila (COL)	Chocolade Jacques–Topsport Vlaanderen	3h 32'37"
5	5 September 2004	London	London	72 km	Enrico Degano (ITA)	Team Barloworld	1h 27'30"

== Final general classification ==
	Name	Team	Time
1	Mauricio Ardila (COL)	Chocolade Jacques–Topsport Vlaanderen	18h 58'36"
2	Julian Dean (NZL)	Crédit Agricole	+ 00'12"
3	Nick Nuyens (BEL)	Quick-Step–Davitamon	+ 00'17"
