= 2000 Vuelta a Castilla y León =

Race details
- Dates: 31 July–4 August 2000
- Stages: 5
- Distance: 679.5 km (422.2 mi)
- Winning time: 17h 27' 05"

Results
	Winner	Francisco Mancebo (ESP)
	Second	Aitor Osa (ESP)
	Third	Dave Bruylandts (BEL)

The 2000 Vuelta a Castilla y León was the 15th edition of the Vuelta a Castilla y León cycle race and was held on 31 July to 4 August 2000. The race started in Valladolid and finished in Bembibre. The race was won by Francisco Mancebo.

== Teams ==
Fifteen teams of up to eight riders started the race:

- Banesto
- Team Telekom
- Vitalicio Seguros
- Mercatone Uno–Albacom
- ONCE–Deutsche Bank
- Farm Frites
- Kelme–Costa Blanca
- Post Swiss Team
- Euskaltel–Euskadi
- Amica Chips–Tacconi Sport
- Colchon Relax–Fuenlabrada
- Palmans–Ideal
- Jazztel–Costa de Almería
- Alessio
- Team Nürnberger

== General classification ==
Final general classification

Rank	Rider	Time
1	Francisco Mancebo (ESP)	17h 27' 05"
2	Aitor Osa (ESP)	+ 14"
3	Dave Bruylandts (BEL)	+ 47"
4	Georg Totschnig (AUT)	+ 53"
5	Mikel Zarrabeitia (ESP)	+ 55"
6	Haimar Zubeldia (ESP)	+ 1' 15"
7	Igor González de Galdeano (ESP)	+ 1' 17"
8	Unai Osa (ESP)	+ 1' 43"
9	Íñigo Cuesta (ESP)	+ 1' 47"
10	Carlos Sastre (ESP)	+ 2' 20"
