= Tadej Valjavec =

Slovenian cyclist

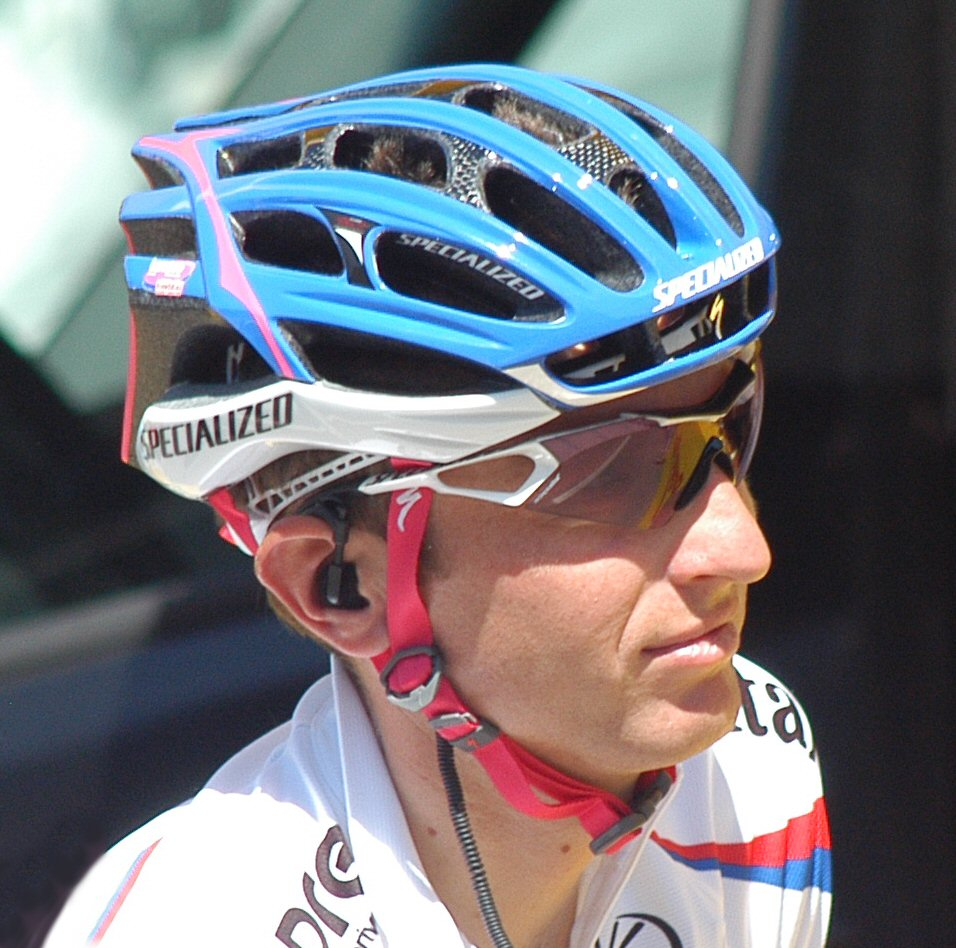
- Valjavec at the 2007 Tour de France

Personal information
- Full name: Tadej Valjavec
- Born: 13 April 1977 (age 49) Kranj, Yugoslavia
- Height: 1.71 m (5 ft 7 in)
- Weight: 59 kg (130 lb)

Cycling career
- Sport: Cycling
- Current team: Retired
- Discipline: Road
- Role: Rider
- Rider type: Climbing specialist

Amateur teams
- 1994–1999: Sava Kranj
- 1999: Cucine Caneva Record
- 2018: KK Kranj

Professional teams
- 2000–2003: Fassa Bortolo
- 2004–2005: Phonak
- 2006–2007: Lampre–Fondital
- 2008–2010: Ag2r–La Mondiale
- 2011: Manisaspor
- 2013: Sava

Major wins
- National Road Race Championships (2003, 2007)

Tadej Valjavec (born 13 April 1977 in Kranj) is a Slovenian former professional road bicycle racer, who last competed for the Sava team. He is well known as a good climber due to his rides on mountain stages in the Giro d'Italia. Although he has achieved relatively few professional wins in his career, he has consistently performed well in the Grand Tours, with three top ten and four further top 20 finishes.

== Doping ==
On 4 May 2010 Valjavec's name was released as being one of several riders under investigation by the UCI for "irregular blood values". He was provisionally suspended by Ag2r-La Mondiale and pulled from their squad for the impending Giro d'Italia. Team manager Vincent Lavenu stated that should the Slovenian cycling federation sanction him, he would be fired. Valjavec has proclaimed his innocence and claimed an unreported illness is responsible for the values. On 30 July the Slovenian federation officially cleared Valjavec, criticizing the usage of the biological passport in this case stating that it failed to take into account the possible natural reasons for Valjavec's irregular levels. The UCI will likely appeal the case to the Court of Arbitration for Sport.

On 22 April 2011 The Court of Arbitration for Sport set aside the decision to exonerate the athlete from any doping offense and imposed a two-year ban on him starting on 20 January 2011, as well as the disqualification of all his results obtained between 19 April and 30 September 2009.

== Career achievements ==
=== Major results ===
1994
1st Overall Giro di Basilicata
8th Road race, UCI Junior Road World Championships
1995
1st Overall Giro di Basilicata
1998
3rd GP Kranj
1999
1st Overall Giro Ciclistico d'Italia
2nd Overall Tour de Slovénie
2000
3rd Overall Grand Prix du Midi Libre
4th Trofeo Laigueglia
7th Tour du Haut Var
2001
5th Road race, National Road Championships
7th GP Industria & Commercio di Prato
8th Tre Valli Varesine
2002
1st Overall Settimana Ciclistica Lombarda
6th Overall Giro del Trentino
7th Giro dell'Appennino
10th Overall Tour de Suisse
2003
1st Road race, National Road Championships
3rd Giro di Toscana
5th Overall Tour de Suisse
6th Giro dell'Appennino
10th Overall Tour of Belgium
10th Trofeo Matteotti
2004
4th Overall Tour de Romandie
9th Overall Giro d'Italia
2005
6th Overall Deutschland Tour
9th Overall Tour de Suisse
10th Overall Tour de Romandie
2006
8th Overall Tour of Slovenia
10th Trofeo Melinda
2007
1st Road race, National Road Championships
2nd Overall Volta a la Comunitat Valenciana
3rd Overall Vuelta a Andalucía
4th Overall Paris–Nice
7th Overall Tour of the Basque Country
9th Overall Critérium du Dauphiné Libéré
10th La Flèche Wallonne
2008
10th Overall Tour de France
2009

Voided results between 19 April and 30 September 2009.

7th Overall Tour de Suisse
9th Overall Giro d'Italia

2010
9th GP Lugano
9th Gran Premio Industria e Commercio di Prato
2010
8th Gran Premio dell'Insubria-Lugano
9th GP Industria & Commercio di Prato
2011
2nd Overall Cinturón Ciclista Internacional a Mallorca
2013
4th Overall Tour of Slovenia
5th Overall Istrian Spring Trophy
8th Overall Tour de Slovaquie
10th GP Kranj

=== Grand Tour general classification results timeline ===
Grand Tour	2001	2002	2003	2004	2005	2006	2007	2008	2009
Giro d'Italia	30	—	—	9	15	34	—	13	~~9~~
Tour de France	—	—	—	—	—	17	19	9	—
Vuelta a España	—	18	—	26	—	—	—	—	~~30~~

Legend
—	Did not compete
DNF	Did not finish
