= Rubén Plaza =

Spanish professional road bicycle racer

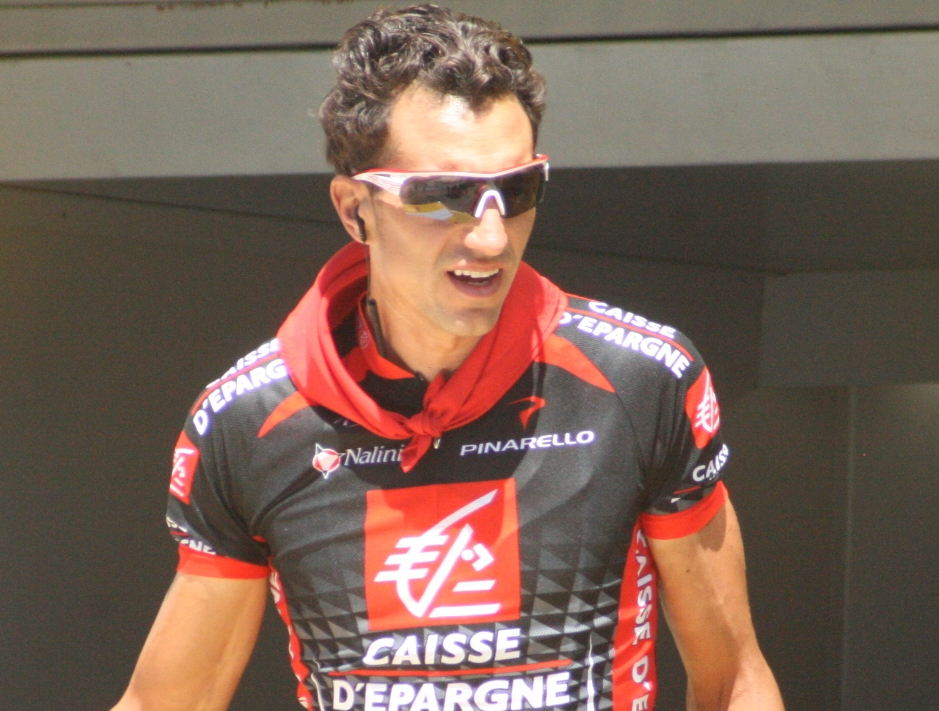
- Plaza at the 2010 Tour de France

Personal information
- Full name: Rubén Plaza Molina
- Nickname: El Professore
- Born: 29 February 1980 (age 46) Ibi, Spain
- Height: 1.90 m (6 ft 3 in)
- Weight: 77 kg (170 lb; 12.1 st)

Cycling career
- Sport: Cycling
- Current team: NSN Cycling Team; NSN Development Team
- Discipline: Road
- Role: Rider (retired); Directeur sportif
- Rider type: Climber

Amateur team
- 1999–2000: Banesto amateur

Professional teams
- 2001–2003: iBanesto.com
- 2004–2006: Comunidad Valenciana–Kelme
- 2007: Caisse d'Epargne
- 2008: Benfica
- 2009: Liberty Seguros
- 2010–2014: Caisse d'Epargne
- 2015: Lampre–Merida
- 2016–2017: Orica–GreenEDGE
- 2018–2019: Israel Cycling Academy

Managerial teams
- 2021–: Israel Cycling Academy
- 2023–: Israel–Premier Tech

Major wins
- Grand Tours Tour de France 1 individual stage (2015) Vuelta a España 2 individual stages (2005, 2015) Stage races Vuelta a Castilla y León (2013, 2018) Single-day races and Classics National Road Race Championships (2003, 2009)

Rubén Plaza Molina (born 29 February 1980) is a Spanish former professional road bicycle racer, who competed professionally between 2001 and 2019 for the Comunidad Valenciana–Kelme, Benfica, Liberty Seguros, Movistar Team (over three spells), Lampre–Merida, Orica–Scott and Israel Cycling Academy teams. During his career, he recorded a top 5 overall placing in the 2005 Vuelta a España, and won three Grand Tour stages.

Following his retirement, Plaza has worked as a directeur sportif for UCI Continental team NSN Development Team since 2021, and for UCI ProTeam NSN Cycling Team, since the start of the 2023 season.

== Career ==
Plaza was born in Ibi, Spain. In 2006 he was implicated in the Operación Puerto doping case, but was later acquitted of any involvement. Nevertheless, after an abridged 2007 season with Caisse d'Epargne he spent 2008 and 2009 with smaller Continental level teams in Portugal. Despite this, in 2009 he was able to take his second victory in the Spanish national championships, before finishing 4th overall in the Volta a Portugal, a result which was later upgraded to 3rd by the disqualification of his Liberty Seguros teammate Nuno Ribeiro for a doping violation. The simultaneous positive tests of two of the team's other riders caused the team to disband, leaving Plaza without a ride for 2010. Despite being linked to the Astana team, Plaza returned to Caisse d'Epargne, the signing made official in December 2009.

In 2015, he won Stage 16 of the Tour de France, his second Grand Tour stage win.

In 2015, he also won Stage 20 of the Vuelta a España. He was named in the start list for the 2016 Giro d'Italia.

== Major results ==
1997
National Junior Road Championships

1st Road race
3rd Time trial

1998
1st Time trial, National Junior Road Championships
2003
1st Road race, National Road Championships
1st Stage 5 Regio-Tour
2004
1st Stage 5 (ITT) Troféu Joaquim Agostinho
3rd Trofeo Cala Millor
4th Overall Vuelta a Murcia
6th Overall Volta a la Comunitat Valenciana
10th Circuito de Getxo
2005
1st Overall Grande Prémio Internacional Costa Azul

1st Mountains classification
1st Stage 2

1st Overall Vuelta a Aragón

1st Stage 4 (ITT)

1st Stage 2 Vuelta a Murcia
3rd Time trial, National Road Championships
4th Time trial, UCI Road World Championships
5th Overall Vuelta a España

1st Stage 20 (ITT)

5th Klasika Primavera
6th Overall Critérium International
2006
1st Clásica a los Puertos de Guadarrama
2nd Overall Vuelta a La Rioja
2nd Time trial, National Road Championships
4th Overall Vuelta a Asturias

1st Stage 5

4th Overall Troféu Joaquim Agostinho

1st Stage 1

9th Subida a Urkiola
2007
1st Overall Vuelta a La Rioja
4th Overall Clásica Internacional de Alcobendas
5th Overall Euskal Bizikleta
10th Overall Vuelta a Burgos
2008
1st Overall Volta a la Comunitat Valenciana
1st Stage 1 (ITT) Vuelta a la Comunidad de Madrid
2nd Time trial, National Road Championships
3rd Overall Volta a Portugal

1st Prologue

9th Overall Volta ao Algarve
2009
National Road Championships

1st Road race
3rd Time trial

1st Stage 2 GP CTT Correios de Portugal
2nd Overall Vuelta a Murcia

1st Stage 4

3rd Overall Volta ao Algarve
3rd Overall Volta a Portugal

1st Stage 6 (Note: The original winner, Eladio Jiménez, was later suspended for use of EPO and testosterone. The victory was awarded to Plaza, who had originally finished second.)

4th Overall Circuit de Lorraine

1st Stage 3

2010
3rd Time trial, National Road Championships
10th Overall Tour de France
2012
10th Overall Circuit de la Sarthe
2013
1st Overall Vuelta a Castilla y León

1st Stage 3

3rd Time trial, National Road Championships
4th Vuelta a la Comunidad de Madrid
6th Overall Route du Sud
9th Overall Vuelta a Asturias
2015
1st Stage 16 Tour de France
Vuelta a España

1st Stage 20
Combativity award Stage 20

2018
1st Overall Vuelta a Castilla y León

1st Stage 3

9th Prueba Villafranca de Ordizia
2019
6th Overall Tour of Antalya
10th GP Miguel Induráin

=== Grand Tour general classification results timeline ===
Grand Tour	2005	2006	2007	2008	2009	2010	2011	2012	2013	2014	2015	2016	2017	2018	2019
Giro d'Italia	—	—	—	—	—	—	—	—	—	—	—	56	30	47	71
Tour de France	—	—	—	—	—	10	—	101	47	91	30	72	—	—	—
Vuelta a España	5	—	—	—	—	14	—	—	—	—	45	—	—	—	—

Legend
—	Did not compete
DNF	Did not finish

== Notes ==
Sporting positions
Preceded by Juan Carlos Guillamón	Spanish National Road Race Championships; Winner; 2003	Succeeded by Francisco Mancebo
Preceded by Alejandro Valverde	Spanish National Road Race Championships; Winner; 2009	Succeeded by Iván Gutiérrez
