= Unai Yus =

Spanish cyclist

Personal information
- Born: February 13, 1974 (age 52) Vitoria-Gasteiz, Spain

Cycling career
- Sport: Cycling
- Discipline: Cyclo-cross
- Role: Rider

Unai Emilio Yus Querejeta (born February 13, 1974, in Vitoria-Gasteiz) is a Spanish professional racing cyclist.

== Career highlights ==
2001
1st Porto - Lisboa
1st Stage 12 Volta a Portugal, Fafe

2003
1st Stage 1 Volta a Terras de Santa Maria, San Joao Ver
2nd General Classification Volta a Terras de Santa Maria
2nd Porto - Lisboa

2004
1st Stage 1 Hessen Rundfahrt, Bad Arolsen
2nd Bera, Cyclo-cross
2nd Aizarnazabal, Cyclo-cross
3rd Ermua, Cyclo-cross
3rd Valladolid, Cyclo-cross
2nd Itsasondo, Cyclo-cross

2005
2nd Zeberio, Cyclo-cross
1st (Spain) Spanish National Cyclo-cross Championships
2nd Polanco, Cyclo-cross
3rd Lugones, Cyclo-cross
2nd Astarria, Cyclo-cross
1st Ormaiztegi, Cyclo-cross
1st Montjuic, Cyclo-cross
2nd Elorrio, Cyclo-cross
1st Itsasondo, Cyclo-cross
2nd Legutiano, Cyclo-cross

2006
1st Abadino, Cyclo-cross
1st Villarcayo, Cyclo-cross
1st Pobes, Cyclo-cross
1st Karrantza, Cyclo-cross
1st San Román de Candamo, Cyclo-cross
1st Montjuic, Cyclo-cross
2nd Puente Viesgo, Cyclo-cross
1st Bermeo, Cyclo-cross
2nd Ormaiztegi, Cyclo-cross
2nd Elorrio, Cyclo-cross

2007
2nd Muxika, Cyclo-cross
1st Iraeta, Cyclo-cross
3rd Avilés, Cyclo-cross (b)
2nd Medina de Pomar, Cyclo-cross
2nd Villarcayo, Cyclo-cross
1st Pobes, Cyclo-cross
1st Bergara, Cyclo-cross
3rd Karrantza, Cyclo-cross
2nd San Sebastian de los Reyes, Cyclo-cross
1st Colindres, Cyclo-cross (b)
2nd Cambre, Cyclo-cross
1st Navia, Cyclo-cross
1st Valencia, Cyclo-cross
2nd Elorrio, Cyclo-cross
2nd Itsasondo, Cyclo-cross
2nd Bermeo, Cyclo-cross

2008
2nd Ramales, Cyclo-cross
1st Guernica, Cyclo-cross
3rd Ispaster, Cyclo-cross
