= Rodrigo García (cyclist) =

Spanish cyclist

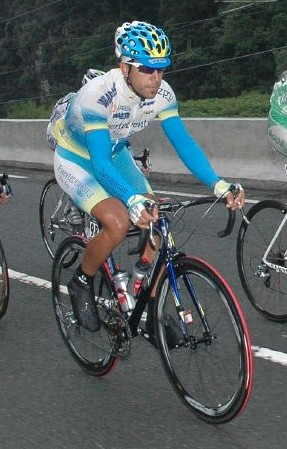

Personal information
- Full name: Rodrigo García Rena
- Born: February 27, 1980 (age 46) Miajadas, Spain

Cycling career
- Sport: Cycling
- Current team: Retired
- Discipline: Road
- Role: Rider

Professional teams
- 2005–2006: Kaiku
- 2007: Fuerteventura–Canarias
- 2008: Extremadura
- 2009: Miche–Guerciotti
- 2010: Xacobeo–Galicia

Rodrigo García Rena (born February 27, 1980, in Miajadas) is a Spanish cyclist.

== Palmarès ==
2003
1st stages 2 and 4 Volta a Lleida
1st Vuelta a la Montana Central de Asturias

1st stage 2

3rd Cursa Ciclista del Llobregat
3rd Vuelta a Toledo
2004
1st Copa de España
1st Cursa Ciclista del Llobregat
1st Vuelta a Toledo

1st stage 1

1st stage 2a Vuelta a la Montana Central de Asturias
3rd Aiztondo Klasica
2006
2nd Vuelta a Andalucía
2007
1st stages 4 and 5 Vuelta a Asturias
