= Mauricio Ardila =

Colombian road bicycle racer

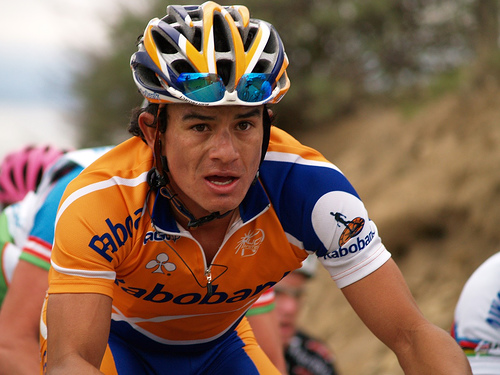

Personal information
- Full name: Mauricio Alberto Ardila Cano
- Born: May 21, 1979 (age 47) Colombia
- Height: 1.65 m (5 ft 5 in)
- Weight: 58 kg (128 lb)

Cycling career
- Sport: Cycling
- Current team: Retired
- Discipline: Road
- Role: Rider

Amateur teams
- 2013–2014: Aguardiente Antioqueño–Lotería de Medellín–IDEA
- 2016–2017: Aguardiente Antioqueño–Lotería de Medellín–Idea Indeportes Antioquia

Professional teams
- 2002–2003: Marlux–Ville de Charleroi
- 2004: Vlaanderen–T Interim
- 2005: Davitamon–Lotto
- 2006–2010: Rabobank
- 2011: Geox–TMC
- 2012: Coldeportes–Comcel
- 2015: Orgullo Antioqueño

Major wins
- Tour of Britain (2004)

Mauricio Alberto Ardila Cano (born May 12, 1979, in Medellín) is a Colombian former professional road bicycle racer.

== Major results ==
1999
1st Stage 11 Vuelta a Guatemala
2002
1st Stage 4 Tour of Sweden
1st Stage 10 Tour de l'Avenir
2003
4th Subida a Urkiola
2004
1st Overall Tour of Britain

1st Stages 2 & 4

2nd Overall Rheinland-Pfalz Rundfahrt
5th Subida a Urkiola
7th Circuito de Getxo
8th Overall Vuelta a Burgos
2005
1st Stage 5 Niedersachsen-Rundfahrt
9th Overall Vuelta a España
2006
6th Road race, National Road Championships
2008
3rd Rund um den Henninger Turm
2011
10th Klasika Primavera
10th GP Llodio
2012
2nd Overall Vuelta a Bolivia

1st Stage 3 (TTT)

2014
National Road Championships

8th Time trial
10th Road race
