= Francisco Mancebo =

Spanish racing cyclist (born 1976)

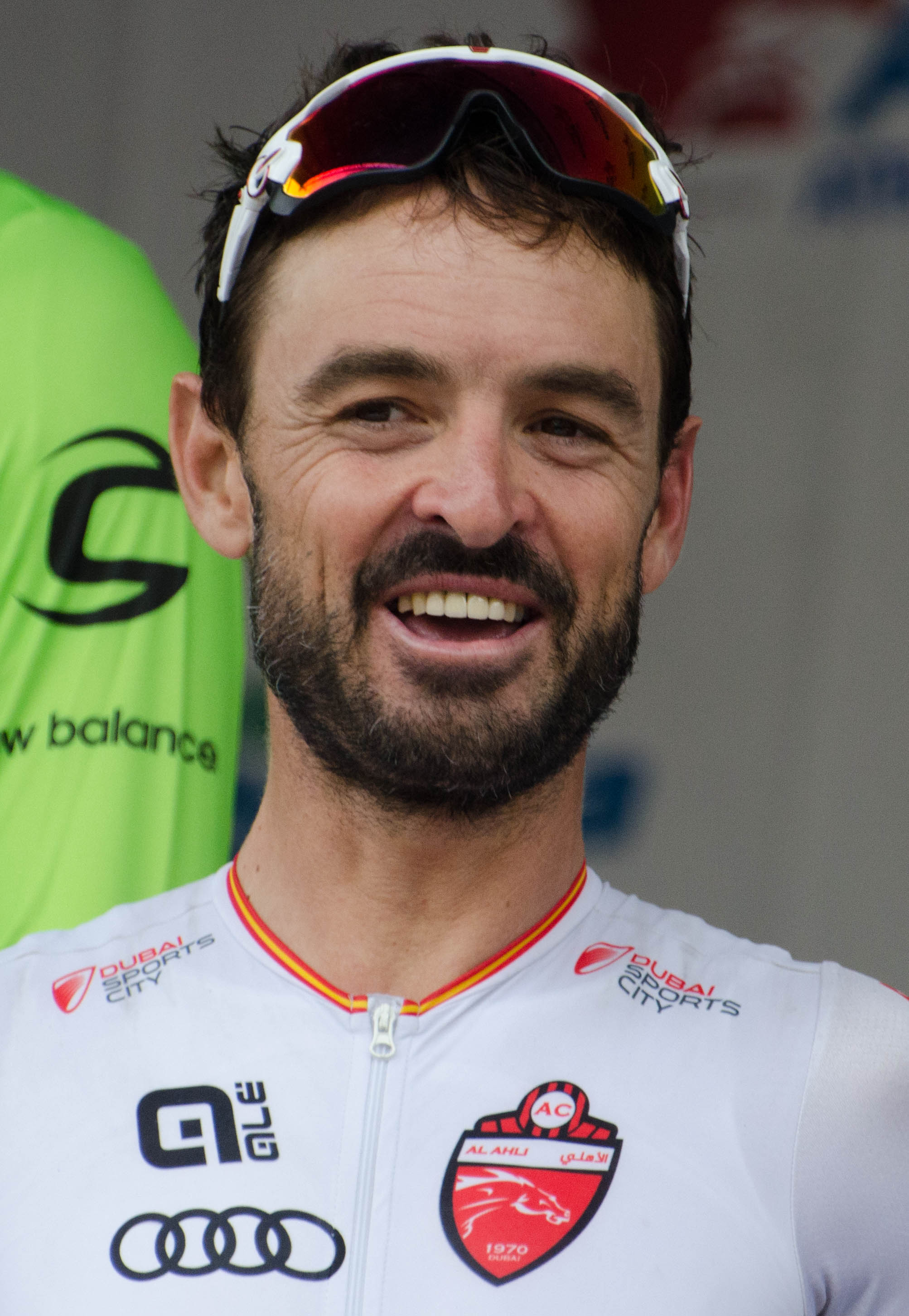
- Mancebo at the 2016 Tour of Alberta

Personal information
- Full name: Francisco Mancebo Pérez
- Nickname: Paco
- Born: 9 March 1976 (age 50) Madrid, Spain

Cycling career
- Sport: Cycling
- Current team: Pingtan International Tourism Island Cycling Team
- Discipline: Road
- Role: Rider
- Rider type: Climber

Professional teams
- 1998–2005: Banesto
- 2006: AG2R Prévoyance
- 2007: Relax–GAM
- 2008: Fercase–Rota dos Móveis
- 2009: Rock Racing
- 2010: Heraklion Kastro–Murcia
- 2011–2012: Realcyclist.com Cycling Team
- 2013: 5-hour Energy
- 2014–2016: Skydive Dubai Pro Cycling
- 2017: Canyon Bicycles
- 2018: Inteja Dominican Cycling Team
- 2019–2025: Matrix Powertag
- 2026–: Pingtan International Tourism Island Cycling Team

Major wins
- Grand Tours Tour de France Young rider classification (2000) Vuelta a España 1 individual stage (2005) Stage races Vuelta a Burgos (2002) One-day races and Classics National Road Race Championships (2004)

Francisco Mancebo Pérez (born 9 March 1976) is a Spanish professional cyclist, who currently rides for UCI Continental team Pingtan International Tourism Island Cycling Team. He initially rode for team Illes Balears–Banesto, but moved to AG2R Prévoyance in 2006.

Mancebo is a stage race specialist, with good climbing and individual time trial performances. He was the winner of the Spanish National Road Race Championships in 2004, and finished third in the Vuelta a España. He finished sixth in the 2004 Tour de France and fourth in the 2005 Tour de France. He also won a stage of the 2005 Vuelta a España and finished fourth in the general classification.

== Career ==
Born in Madrid, Mancebo won the young rider classification at the 2000 Tour de France.

Mancebo was himself implicated in the Operación Puerto doping case and was pulled from that year's Tour de France on the eve of the race. Contrary to reports circulating at the time, Mancebo denies that he ever retired after news of the affair broke. "I never retired. Some journalists said I did, but that never happened", Mancebo told Cyclingnews. "I changed my focus."

In the 2009 season, he rode with the team Rock Racing. For 2010 he rode with Heraklion Kastro-Murcia and with the Canyon Bicycle's Team in the Tour of Utah, in an effort to defend his overall classification title. In 2011, he rode with the Realcyclist.com Cycling Team, where he was the #1 rider in the NRC standings. For 2012 he rode with the Competitive Cyclist Racing Team repeating as the NRC Champion and named Stage Racer of the Year by VeloNews. 2013 saw Mancebo ride under the colors of 5-hour Energy.

Mancebo joined the Continental squad Skydive Dubai Pro Cycling for its debut season in 2014. He stayed with the team through to the 2016 season: in April 2017 Canyon Bicycles announced that they had signed him for 2017.

In January 2025, Mancebo became the oldest rider to win a UCI road race at the age of 48, winning stage 1 of Tour du Sahel. He would retire from professional cycling later that year after finishing 30th overall at the Tour de Kyushu.

== Major results ==
=== Mountain bike ===
2009
1st Marathon, National Championships
2010
1st Marathon, National Championships
2014
1st Marathon, National Championships
2016
1st Marathon, National Championships
UCI Marathon Series

2nd Titan Villuercas

2021
3rd Marathon, National Championships

=== Road ===
1994
3rd Road race, National Junior Championships
1997
1st Stage 5b Vuelta a Navarra
3rd Prueba Villafranca de Ordizia
7th Road race, UCI World Under-23 Championships
1998 (1 pro win)
1st Trofeo Foral de Navarra
1999
3rd Circuito de Getxo
5th Overall Vuelta a Andalucía
5th Klasika Primavera
6th Clásica de San Sebastián
8th Overall Vuelta a La Rioja
2000 (4)
1st Overall Vuelta a Castilla y León

1st Stage 5

1st Clásica a los Puertos de Guadarrama
2nd Overall Route du Sud

1st Stage 2

3rd Overall Paris–Nice
7th Klasika Primavera
9th Overall Tour de France

1st Young rider classification

2001
4th Overall Tour Méditerranéen
5th Overall Route du Sud
6th GP Miguel Induráin
8th Klasika Primavera
9th Overall Grand Prix du Midi Libre
10th Giro di Lombardia
2002 (1)
1st Overall Vuelta a Burgos
5th Overall Vuelta a Castilla y León
5th Clásica a los Puertos de Guadarrama
6th GP Miguel Induráin
7th Overall Tour de France
8th Overall Volta a Catalunya
10th Klasika Primavera
10th Giro di Lombardia
2003 (2)
1st Overall Vuelta a Castilla y León

1st Stage 1 (TTT)

1st Classique des Alpes
2nd Overall Vuelta a La Rioja

1st Points classification

2nd Subida al Naranco
2nd Memorial Galera
4th Overall Critérium du Dauphiné Libéré
5th Overall Vuelta a España
9th Overall Vuelta a Aragón
10th Overall Tour de France
2004 (2)
1st Road race, National Championships
2nd Rund um die Hainleite
3rd Overall Vuelta a España
5th Overall Deutschland Tour

1st Stage 6

5th Overall Vuelta a Aragón
6th Overall Tour de France
8th Overall Tour de Romandie
2005 (1)
2nd Road race, National Championships
2nd Japan Cup
4th Overall Tour de France
4th Overall Vuelta a España

1st Stage 10

5th Overall Clásica Internacional de Alcobendas
9th Clásica a los Puertos de Guadarrama
10th Overall Critérium du Dauphiné Libéré
2006
5th Overall Critérium du Dauphiné Libéré

1st Points classification

7th Overall Volta a Catalunya
2007
1st Overall Vuelta a Chihuahua
2nd Subida al Naranco
3rd Overall Tour of Qinghai Lake
3rd Overall Tour de San Luis
4th Overall Route du Sud
4th Overall Vuelta a Asturias
5th Overall Vuelta por un Chile Líder

1st Stage 7b (ITT)

5th Klasika Primavera
6th Overall Vuelta a Andalucía
6th Overall Volta a Catalunya
7th GP Miguel Induráin
2008
1st Overall Vuelta a Chihuahua
2nd Overall Vuelta a la Comunidad de Madrid
3rd Overall GP CTT Correios de Portugal
6th Overall Clásica Internacional de Alcobendas
6th Overall Volta a Portugal
9th Gran Premio de Llodio
2009 (3)
1st Overall Vuelta a Asturias

1st Stage 4

1st Overall Tour of Utah

1st Stage 1

1st Stage 1 Tour of California
2nd Cascade Cycling Classic
4th Time trial, National Championships
7th Overall Vuelta a Chihuahua
9th Overall Vuelta a la Comunidad de Madrid
2010
1st Overall Tour de Guadeloupe

1st Stage 1 (ITT)

1st Christmas Race
2nd Overall Tour of Utah
3rd Overall Tour of Bulgaria
4th Overall Vuelta a la Comunidad de Madrid
5th Overall Cinturó de l'Empordà
6th Prueba Villafranca de Ordizia
8th Overall UCI America Tour
10th Overall Tour de Beauce
2011
1st Overall USA National Racing Calendar
1st Overall Tour of the Gila

1st Mountains classification
1st Stages 1 & 5

1st Overall Sea Otter Classic

1st Stages 2 & 3

1st Overall Tour de Beauce

1st Points classification
1st Stage 3

1st Overall Redlands Bicycle Classic

1st Stage 1

1st Overall Cascade Cycling Classic

1st Stage 2

1st Prueba Escuela de Alaejos
4th Overall San Dimas Stage Race
7th Overall Joe Martin Stage Race

1st Stage 1

2012
1st Overall USA National Racing Calendar
1st Overall Tucson Bicycle Classic

1st Stage 2

1st Overall Joe Martin Stage Race

1st Stage 1

1st Overall Cascade Cycling Classic

1st Stage 1

1st Tour of the Battenkill
3rd Overall Redlands Bicycle Classic
4th Overall Tour of the Gila
7th Overall Tour de Beauce

1st Points classification
1st Stage 1

7th Overall Rutas de América
8th Taiwan KOM Challenge
9th Overall San Dimas Stage Race
2013 (1)
1st Overall USA National Racing Calendar
1st Overall Redlands Bicycle Classic

1st Stage 4

2nd Overall Joe Martin Stage Race
2nd Overall Vuelta a Castilla y León
2nd Heber Valley Circuit Race
3rd Overall Tour of the Gila

1st Stage 5

4th Overall Tour de Beauce

1st Stage 3

5th Overall UCI America Tour
5th Overall Cascade Cycling Classic
7th Overall Tour of California
7th Overall Tour of Alberta
7th Philadelphia International Cycling Classic
9th Overall Tour of Utah

1st Stage 6

10th Overall Tour of Taihu Lake
2014
1st Overall Tour de Kumano

1st Stage 2

1st El Ganso del Escorial
Arab Games Clubs

2nd Road race
2nd Time trial
3rd Team time trial

3rd Overall Tour of Thailand
4th Overall Sharjah International Cycling Tour
5th Overall Jelajah Malaysia
5th Melaka Governor's Cup
2015
1st Overall Tour d'Egypte

1st Stage 1

1st Overall Jelajah Malaysia

1st Stages 1 & 2 (TTT)

2nd El Ganso del Escorial
3rd Overall Sharjah International Cycling Tour
4th Klasika Primavera
5th Overall Tour de Langkawi
5th Overall Tour of Japan
7th Overall La Tropicale Amissa Bongo
8th GP Miguel Induráin
9th Overall Tour of Taihu Lake
10th Overall Vuelta a Castilla y León
10th Overall Cascade Cycling Classic

1st Stage 1

2016 (1)
1st El Ganso del Escorial
1st Stage 5 Tour of Alberta
2nd Overall Tour de Taiwan
2nd Overall Sharjah International Cycling Tour

1st Stage 1 (TTT)

2nd Memorial Clavero
4th Overall Tour de Langkawi
2017
4th Overall Grand Prix Cycliste de Saguenay
2018
2nd Overall Tour de Guadeloupe
5th Winston-Salem Cycling Classic
6th Overall Tour du Maroc
2019
1st Overall Ronda Pilipinas

1st Stage 1

1st Overall Minamiuonuma Road
1st Mountains classification, Vuelta a la Comunidad de Madrid
2nd Overall Ministry of Economy Commerce and Industry Japan
3rd Overall Akiyoshidai Karst Race
4th Overall Tour of Japan
4th Japan Cup
6th Overall Tour de Tochigi
9th Overall Tour de Kumano
2020
1st Overall Ministry of Economy Commerce and Industry Japan
2021
1st Oita Urban Classic
4th Overall Tour of Japan
2022
4th Oita Ikoinomichi Criterium
6th Overall Tour of Japan
6th Oita Urban Classic
10th Overall Tour de Kumano
10th Overall Tour de Hokkaido
2023
4th Oita Urban Classic
4th Tour de Okinawa
10th Overall Tour de Kumano
2025
1st Stage 1 Tour du Sahel

=== Grand Tour general classification results timeline ===
Grand Tour	1999	2000	2001	2002	2003	2004	2005
Giro d'Italia	—	20	—	—	—	—	—
Tour de France	28	9	13	7	10	6	4
Vuelta a España	—	—	—	DNF	5	3	4

Legend
—	Did not compete
DNF	Did not finish
