= Carlos García Quesada (cyclist) =

Spanish cyclist

Personal information
- Full name: Carlos García Quesada
- Born: April 18, 1978 (age 48) La Zubia, Spain

Cycling career
- Sport: Cycling
- Current team: Retired
- Discipline: Road
- Role: Rider

Professional teams
- 2001–2005: Kelme
- 2006–2007: Unibet.com

Major wins
- Vuelta a España, 1 stage Vuelta a Andalucía (2006); Vuelta a Castilla y León (2005); GP Villafranca de Ordizia (2005)

Carlos García Quesada (born April 18, 1978 in La Zubia) is a Spanish former professional road racing cyclist. He turned professional with Kelme in 2001, and stayed with them until the end of 2005. In 2006, he moved to Unibet.com. However, in 2006, his name was linked to the Operación Puerto doping case and was sidelined by his team. In early 2007, García Quesada came to a mutual agreement with Unibet.com to leave the team, following several months having not been paid.

His brother Adolfo is also a former professional cyclist.
