= 2007 Vuelta a España, Stage 12 to Stage 21 =

Cycling race stages

The 2007 Vuelta a España was the 62nd edition of the Vuelta a España, one of cycling's Grand Tours. The Vuelta began in Vigo, on 1 September, and Stage 12 occurred on 12 September with a stage from Algemesí. The race finished in Madrid on 23 September.

== Stage 12 ==
13 September 2007 — Algemesí to Hellín, 176 km (109 mi)

Route profile:

Stage 12 result

Rank	Rider	Team	Time
1	Alessandro Petacchi (ITA)	Team Milram	3h 41' 01"
2	Daniele Bennati (ITA)	Lampre–Fondital	s.t.
3	Alexandre Usov (BLR)	AG2R Prévoyance	s.t.
4	Davide Viganò (ITA)	Quick-Step–Innergetic	s.t.
5	Aurélien Clerc (SUI)	Bouygues Télécom	s.t.
6	Magnus Bäckstedt (SWE)	Liquigas	s.t.
7	Samuel Sánchez (ESP)	Euskaltel–Euskadi	s.t.
8	Stefan Schumacher (GER)	Gerolsteiner	s.t.
9	Allan Davis (AUS)	Discovery Channel	s.t.
10	André Greipel (GER)	T-Mobile Team	s.t.

General classification after stage 12

Rank	Rider	Team	Time
1	Denis Menchov (RUS)	Rabobank	48h 08' 26"
2	Vladimir Efimkin (RUS)	Caisse d'Epargne	+ 2' 01"
3	Cadel Evans (AUS)	Predictor–Lotto	+ 2' 27"
4	Carlos Sastre (ESP)	Team CSC	+ 3' 02"
5	Ezequiel Mosquera (ESP)	Karpin–Galicia	+ 4' 35"
6	Samuel Sánchez (ESP)	Euskaltel–Euskadi	+ 4' 42"
7	Vladimir Karpets (RUS)	Caisse d'Epargne	+ 5' 49"
8	Manuel Beltrán (ESP)	Liquigas	+ 5' 56"
9	Stijn Devolder (BEL)	Discovery Channel	+ 6' 28"
10	Carlos Barredo (ESP)	Quick-Step–Innergetic	+ 6' 39"

== Stage 13 ==
14 September 2007 — Hellín to Torre-Pacheco, 176.4 km (109.6 mi)

Stage 13 result

Rank	Rider	Team	Time
1	Andreas Klier (GER)	T-Mobile Team	4h 01' 52"
2	Tom Stamsnijder (NED)	Gerolsteiner	+ 1"
3	Jérémy Roy (FRA)	Française des Jeux	+ 24"
4	Daniele Bennati (ITA)	Lampre–Fondital	+ 4' 03"
5	Alessandro Petacchi (ITA)	Team Milram	s.t.
6	Angelo Furlan (ITA)	Crédit Agricole	s.t.
7	Roy Sentjens (NED)	Predictor–Lotto	s.t.
8	Magnus Bäckstedt (SWE)	Liquigas	s.t.
9	Alexandre Usov (BLR)	AG2R Prévoyance	s.t.
10	Erik Zabel (GER)	Team Milram	s.t.

General classification after stage 13

Rank	Rider	Team	Time
1	Denis Menchov (RUS)	Rabobank	52h 14' 21"
2	Vladimir Efimkin (RUS)	Caisse d'Epargne	+ 2' 01"
3	Cadel Evans (AUS)	Predictor–Lotto	+ 2' 27"
4	Carlos Sastre (ESP)	Team CSC	+ 3' 02"
5	Ezequiel Mosquera (ESP)	Karpin–Galicia	+ 4' 35"
6	Samuel Sánchez (ESP)	Euskaltel–Euskadi	+ 4' 42"
7	Vladimir Karpets (RUS)	Caisse d'Epargne	+ 5' 49"
8	Manuel Beltrán (ESP)	Liquigas	+ 5' 56"
9	Stijn Devolder (BEL)	Discovery Channel	+ 6' 28"
10	Carlos Barredo (ESP)	Quick-Step–Innergetic	+ 6' 39"

== Stage 14 ==
15 September 2007 — Puerto Lumbreras to Villacarrillo, 207 km (129 mi)

Route profile:

Stage 14 result

Rank	Rider	Team	Time
1	Jason McCartney (USA)	Discovery Channel	5h 21' 21"
2	Thomas Löfkvist (SWE)	Française des Jeux	+ 28"
3	Stefan Schumacher (GER)	Gerolsteiner	+ 50"
4	Juan Manuel Gárate (ESP)	Quick-Step–Innergetic	s.t.
5	Alessandro Vanotti (ITA)	Liquigas	s.t.
6	David García (ESP)	Karpin–Galicia	s.t.
7	Xabier Zandio (ESP)	Caisse d'Epargne	s.t.
8	Christian Vande Velde (USA)	Team CSC	s.t.
9	Haimar Zubeldia (ESP)	Euskaltel–Euskadi	s.t.
10	Philip Deignan (IRL)	AG2R Prévoyance	s.t.

General classification after stage 14

Rank	Rider	Team	Time
1	Denis Menchov (RUS)	Rabobank	57h 45' 47"
2	Vladimir Efimkin (RUS)	Caisse d'Epargne	+ 2' 01"
3	Cadel Evans (AUS)	Predictor–Lotto	+ 2' 27"
4	Carlos Sastre (ESP)	Team CSC	+ 3' 02"
5	Ezequiel Mosquera (ESP)	Karpin–Galicia	+ 4' 35"
6	Samuel Sánchez (ESP)	Euskaltel–Euskadi	+ 4' 42"
7	Vladimir Karpets (RUS)	Caisse d'Epargne	+ 5' 49"
8	Manuel Beltrán (ESP)	Liquigas	+ 5' 56"
9	Stijn Devolder (BEL)	Discovery Channel	+ 6' 28"
10	Carlos Barredo (ESP)	Quick-Step–Innergetic	+ 6' 39"

== Stage 15 ==
16 September 2007 — Villacarrillo to Granada, 201.4 km (125.1 mi)

Route profile:

Stage 15 result

Rank	Rider	Team	Time
1	Samuel Sánchez (ESP)	Euskaltel–Euskadi	4h 45' 59"
2	Manuel Beltrán (ESP)	Liquigas	s.t.
3	Carlos Barredo (ESP)	Quick-Step–Innergetic	+ 24"
4	Igor Antón (ESP)	Euskaltel–Euskadi	s.t.
5	Daniel Moreno (ESP)	Relax–GAM	+ 41"
6	Damiano Cunego (ITA)	Lampre–Fondital	s.t.
7	Vladimir Efimkin (RUS)	Caisse d'Epargne	s.t.
8	Cadel Evans (AUS)	Predictor–Lotto	s.t.
9	Denis Menchov (RUS)	Rabobank	s.t.
10	Luis Pérez (ESP)	Andalucía–Cajasur	s.t.

General classification after stage 15

Rank	Rider	Team	Time
1	Denis Menchov (RUS)	Rabobank	62h 32' 27"
2	Vladimir Efimkin (RUS)	Caisse d'Epargne	+ 2' 01"
3	Cadel Evans (AUS)	Predictor–Lotto	+ 2' 27"
4	Carlos Sastre (ESP)	Team CSC	+ 3' 02"
5	Samuel Sánchez (ESP)	Euskaltel–Euskadi	+ 4' 01"
6	Ezequiel Mosquera (ESP)	Karpin–Galicia	+ 4' 35"
7	Manuel Beltrán (ESP)	Liquigas	+ 5' 15"
8	Vladimir Karpets (RUS)	Caisse d'Epargne	+ 6' 17"
9	Carlos Barredo (ESP)	Quick-Step–Innergetic	+ 6' 22"
10	Igor Antón (ESP)	Euskaltel–Euskadi	+ 7' 41"

== Rest day 2 ==
17 September 2007

== Stage 16 ==
18 September 2007 — Jaén to Puertollano, 161.5 km (100.4 mi)

Route profile:

Stage 16 result

Rank	Rider	Team	Time
1	Leonardo Duque (COL)	Cofidis	4h 00' 39"
2	Alexandr Kolobnev (RUS)	Team CSC	s.t.
3	Joan Horrach (ESP)	Caisse d'Epargne	s.t.
4	Koldo Fernández (ESP)	Euskaltel–Euskadi	+ 6"
5	Leonardo Bertagnolli (ITA)	Liquigas	s.t.
6	Javier Mejías (ESP)	Saunier Duval–Prodir	s.t.
7	Sébastien Minard (FRA)	Cofidis	s.t.
8	David López (ESP)	Caisse d'Epargne	s.t.
9	Jean-Marc Marino (FRA)	Crédit Agricole	s.t.
10	José Ruiz Sánchez (ESP)	Andalucía–Cajasur	s.t.

General classification after stage 16

Rank	Rider	Team	Time
1	Denis Menchov (RUS)	Rabobank	66h 40' 49"
2	Vladimir Efimkin (RUS)	Caisse d'Epargne	+ 2' 01"
3	Cadel Evans (AUS)	Predictor–Lotto	+ 2' 27"
4	Carlos Sastre (ESP)	Team CSC	+ 3' 02"
5	Samuel Sánchez (ESP)	Euskaltel–Euskadi	+ 4' 01"
6	Ezequiel Mosquera (ESP)	Karpin–Galicia	+ 4' 35"
7	Manuel Beltrán (ESP)	Liquigas	+ 5' 15"
8	Vladimir Karpets (RUS)	Caisse d'Epargne	+ 6' 17"
9	Carlos Barredo (ESP)	Quick-Step–Innergetic	+ 6' 22"
10	Igor Antón (ESP)	Euskaltel–Euskadi	+ 7' 41"

== Stage 17 ==
19 September 2007 — Ciudad Real to Talavera de la Reina, 175 km (109 mi)

Route profile:

Stage 17 result

Rank	Rider	Team	Time
1	Daniele Bennati (ITA)	Lampre–Fondital	4h 56' 58"
2	Paolo Bettini (ITA)	Quick-Step–Innergetic	s.t.
3	Alessandro Petacchi (ITA)	Team Milram	s.t.
4	André Greipel (GER)	T-Mobile Team	s.t.
5	Magnus Bäckstedt (SWE)	Liquigas	s.t.
6	Allan Davis (AUS)	Discovery Channel	s.t.
7	Mark Renshaw (AUS)	Crédit Agricole	s.t.
8	Erik Zabel (GER)	Team Milram	s.t.
9	Alexandre Usov (BLR)	AG2R Prévoyance	s.t.
10	Koldo Fernández (ESP)	Euskaltel–Euskadi	s.t.

General classification after stage 17

Rank	Rider	Team	Time
1	Denis Menchov (RUS)	Rabobank	70h 37' 47"
2	Vladimir Efimkin (RUS)	Caisse d'Epargne	+ 2' 01"
3	Cadel Evans (AUS)	Predictor–Lotto	+ 2' 27"
4	Carlos Sastre (ESP)	Team CSC	+ 3' 02"
5	Samuel Sánchez (ESP)	Euskaltel–Euskadi	+ 4' 01"
6	Ezequiel Mosquera (ESP)	Karpin–Galicia	+ 4' 35"
7	Manuel Beltrán (ESP)	Liquigas	+ 5' 15"
8	Vladimir Karpets (RUS)	Caisse d'Epargne	+ 6' 17"
9	Carlos Barredo (ESP)	Quick-Step–Innergetic	+ 6' 22"
10	Igor Antón (ESP)	Euskaltel–Euskadi	+ 7' 41"

== Stage 18 ==
20 September 2007 — Talavera de la Reina to Ávila, 153.5 km (95.4 mi)

Route profile:

Stage 18 result

Rank	Rider	Team	Time
1	Luis Pérez (ESP)	Andalucía–Cajasur	3h 43' 45"
2	Cadel Evans (AUS)	Predictor–Lotto	+ 41"
3	Franco Pellizotti (ITA)	Liquigas	s.t.
4	Samuel Sánchez (ESP)	Euskaltel–Euskadi	s.t.
5	Denis Menchov (RUS)	Rabobank	s.t.
6	Ezequiel Mosquera (ESP)	Karpin–Galicia	s.t.
7	Stéphane Goubert (FRA)	AG2R Prévoyance	s.t.
8	Carlos Sastre (ESP)	Team CSC	s.t.
9	Maxime Monfort (BEL)	Cofidis	s.t.
10	Vladimir Karpets (RUS)	Caisse d'Epargne	s.t.

General classification after stage 18

Rank	Rider	Team	Time
1	Denis Menchov (RUS)	Rabobank	74h 22' 13"
2	Cadel Evans (AUS)	Predictor–Lotto	+ 2' 27"
3	Carlos Sastre (ESP)	Team CSC	+ 3' 02"
4	Samuel Sánchez (ESP)	Euskaltel–Euskadi	+ 4' 01"
5	Vladimir Efimkin (RUS)	Caisse d'Epargne	+ 4' 27"
6	Ezequiel Mosquera (ESP)	Karpin–Galicia	+ 4' 35"
7	Vladimir Karpets (RUS)	Caisse d'Epargne	+ 6' 17"
8	Manuel Beltrán (ESP)	Liquigas	+ 7' 41"
9	Igor Antón (ESP)	Euskaltel–Euskadi	+ 7' 47"
10	Carlos Barredo (ESP)	Quick-Step–Innergetic	+ 8' 48"

== Stage 19 ==
21 September 2007 — Ávila to Alto de Abantos, 133 km (83 mi)

Route profile:

Stage 19 result

Rank	Rider	Team	Time
1	Samuel Sánchez (ESP)	Euskaltel–Euskadi	3h 37' 01"
2	Daniel Moreno (ESP)	Relax–GAM	s.t.
3	Denis Menchov (RUS)	Rabobank	+ 3"
4	Carlos Sastre (ESP)	Team CSC	s.t.
5	Igor Antón (ESP)	Euskaltel–Euskadi	+ 14"
6	Sylwester Szmyd (POL)	Lampre–Fondital	+ 29"
7	Stéphane Goubert (FRA)	AG2R Prévoyance	+ 41"
8	Manuel Beltrán (ESP)	Liquigas	+ 49"
9	Ezequiel Mosquera (ESP)	Karpin–Galicia	+ 51"
10	David López (ESP)	Caisse d'Epargne	+ 59"

General classification after stage 19

Rank	Rider	Team	Time
1	Denis Menchov (RUS)	Rabobank	77h 59' 17"
2	Carlos Sastre (ESP)	Team CSC	+ 3' 02"
3	Cadel Evans (AUS)	Predictor–Lotto	+ 3' 49"
4	Samuel Sánchez (ESP)	Euskaltel–Euskadi	+ 3' 58"
5	Ezequiel Mosquera (ESP)	Karpin–Galicia	+ 5' 23"
6	Vladimir Efimkin (RUS)	Caisse d'Epargne	+ 5' 47"
7	Vladimir Karpets (RUS)	Caisse d'Epargne	+ 7' 55"
8	Igor Antón (ESP)	Euskaltel–Euskadi	+ 7' 58"
9	Manuel Beltrán (ESP)	Liquigas	+ 8' 27"
10	Carlos Barredo (ESP)	Quick-Step–Innergetic	+ 10' 08"

== Stage 20 ==
22 September 2007 — Collado Villalba to Collado Villalba, 20 km (12 mi) (ITT)

Route profile:

Stage 20 result

Rank	Rider	Team	Time
1	Samuel Sánchez (ESP)	Euskaltel–Euskadi	22' 11"
2	Denis Menchov (RUS)	Rabobank	+ 12"
3	Denis Menchov (RUS)	Rabobank	+ 14"
4	Carlos Barredo (ESP)	Quick-Step–Innergetic	+ 16"
5	Santos González (ESP)	Karpin–Galicia	+ 18"
6	Cadel Evans (AUS)	Predictor–Lotto	+ 19"
7	Jason McCartney (USA)	Discovery Channel	+ 25"
8	Vladimir Karpets (RUS)	Caisse d'Epargne	+ 26"
9	Maxime Monfort (BEL)	Cofidis	+ 28"
10	Adam Hansen (AUS)	T-Mobile Team	+ 34"

General classification after stage 20

Rank	Rider	Team	Time
1	Denis Menchov (RUS)	Rabobank	78h 21' 40"
2	Carlos Sastre (ESP)	Team CSC	+ 3' 31"
3	Samuel Sánchez (ESP)	Euskaltel–Euskadi	+ 3' 46"
4	Cadel Evans (AUS)	Predictor–Lotto	+ 3' 56"
5	Ezequiel Mosquera (ESP)	Karpin–Galicia	+ 6' 34"
6	Vladimir Efimkin (RUS)	Caisse d'Epargne	+ 7' 07"
7	Vladimir Karpets (RUS)	Caisse d'Epargne	+ 8' 09"
8	Igor Antón (ESP)	Euskaltel–Euskadi	+ 8' 44"
9	Manuel Beltrán (ESP)	Liquigas	+ 9' 38"
10	Carlos Barredo (ESP)	Quick-Step–Innergetic	+ 10' 12"

== Stage 21 ==
23 September 2007 — Rivas-Vaciamadrid to Madrid, 104.2 km (64.7 mi)

Route profile:

Stage 21 result

Rank	Rider	Team	Time
1	Daniele Bennati (ITA)	Lampre–Fondital	2h 37' 27"
2	Alessandro Petacchi (ITA)	Team Milram	s.t.
3	Alexandre Usov (BLR)	AG2R Prévoyance	s.t.
4	Mark Renshaw (AUS)	Crédit Agricole	s.t.
5	Davide Viganò (ITA)	Quick-Step–Innergetic	s.t.
6	André Greipel (GER)	T-Mobile Team	s.t.
7	Koldo Fernández (ESP)	Euskaltel–Euskadi	s.t.
8	Erki Pütsep (EST)	Bouygues Télécom	s.t.
9	Daniel Moreno (ESP)	Relax–GAM	s.t.
10	Leonardo Duque (COL)	Cofidis	s.t.

General classification after stage 21

Rank	Rider	Team	Time
1	Denis Menchov (RUS)	Rabobank	80h 59' 07"
2	Carlos Sastre (ESP)	Team CSC	+ 3' 31"
3	Samuel Sánchez (ESP)	Euskaltel–Euskadi	+ 3' 46"
4	Cadel Evans (AUS)	Predictor–Lotto	+ 3' 56"
5	Ezequiel Mosquera (ESP)	Karpin–Galicia	+ 6' 34"
6	Vladimir Efimkin (RUS)	Caisse d'Epargne	+ 7' 07"
7	Vladimir Karpets (RUS)	Caisse d'Epargne	+ 8' 09"
8	Igor Antón (ESP)	Euskaltel–Euskadi	+ 8' 44"
9	Manuel Beltrán (ESP)	Liquigas	+ 9' 38"
10	Carlos Barredo (ESP)	Quick-Step–Innergetic	+ 10' 12"
