= 2007 Vuelta a España, Stage 1 to Stage 11 =

Cycling race stages

The 2007 Vuelta a España was the 62nd edition of the Vuelta a España, one of cycling's Grand Tours. The Vuelta began in Vigo, on 1 September, and Stage 11 occurred on 12 September with a stage to Algemesí. The race finished in Madrid on 23 September.

== Stage 1 ==
1 September 2007 — Vigo to Vigo, 146.4 km (91.0 mi)

Route profile:

Stage 1 result and general classification after stage 1

Rank	Rider	Team	Time
1	Daniele Bennati (ITA)	Lampre–Fondital	3h 43' 09"
2	Óscar Freire (ESP)	Rabobank	s.t.
3	Alessandro Petacchi (ITA)	Team Milram	s.t.
4	Allan Davis (AUS)	Discovery Channel	s.t.
5	Tom Boonen (BEL)	Quick-Step–Innergetic	s.t.
6	Aurélien Clerc (SUI)	Bouygues Télécom	s.t.
7	Koldo Fernández (ESP)	Euskaltel–Euskadi	s.t.
8	Erik Zabel (GER)	Team Milram	s.t.
9	Rony Martias (FRA)	Bouygues Télécom	s.t.
10	Leonardo Duque (COL)	Cofidis	s.t.

== Stage 2 ==
2 September 2007 — Allariz to Santiago de Compostela, 148.7 km (92.4 mi)

Route profile:

Stage 2 result

Rank	Rider	Team	Time
1	Óscar Freire (ESP)	Rabobank	3h 31' 03"
2	Paolo Bettini (ITA)	Quick-Step–Innergetic	s.t.
3	Leonardo Duque (COL)	Cofidis	s.t.
4	Erik Zabel (GER)	Team Milram	s.t.
5	Davide Rebellin (ITA)	Gerolsteiner	s.t.
6	Rene Mandri (EST)	AG2R Prévoyance	s.t.
7	Aurélien Clerc (SUI)	Bouygues Télécom	s.t.
8	Luis León Sánchez (ESP)	Caisse d'Epargne	s.t.
9	Renaud Dion (FRA)	AG2R Prévoyance	s.t.
10	Lorenzo Bernucci (ITA)	T-Mobile Team	s.t.

General classification after stage 2

Rank	Rider	Team	Time
1	Óscar Freire (ESP)	Rabobank	7h 14' 12"
2	Erik Zabel (GER)	Team Milram	s.t.
3	Leonardo Duque (COL)	Cofidis	s.t.
4	Aurélien Clerc (SUI)	Bouygues Télécom	s.t.
5	Alessandro Petacchi (ITA)	Team Milram	s.t.
6	Alan Pérez (ESP)	Euskaltel–Euskadi	s.t.
7	Patrick Calcagni (SUI)	Liquigas	s.t.
8	André Greipel (GER)	T-Mobile Team	s.t.
9	Angelo Furlan (ITA)	Crédit Agricole	s.t.
10	Ezequiel Mosquera (ESP)	Karpin–Galicia	s.t.

== Stage 3 ==
3 September 2007 — Viveiro to Luarca, 153 km (95 mi)

Route profile:

Stage 3 result

Rank	Rider	Team	Time
1	Paolo Bettini (ITA)	Quick-Step–Innergetic	4h 08' 42"
2	Óscar Freire (ESP)	Rabobank	s.t.
3	Allan Davis (AUS)	Discovery Channel	s.t.
4	Davide Rebellin (ITA)	Gerolsteiner	s.t.
5	Philippe Gilbert (BEL)	Française des Jeux	s.t.
6	Rene Mandri (EST)	AG2R Prévoyance	s.t.
7	Xavier Florencio (ESP)	Bouygues Télécom	s.t.
8	Cadel Evans (AUS)	Predictor–Lotto	s.t.
9	Franco Pellizotti (ITA)	Liquigas	s.t.
10	Daniel Moreno (ESP)	Relax–GAM	s.t.

General classification after stage 3

Rank	Rider	Team	Time
1	Óscar Freire (ESP)	Rabobank	11h 22' 54"
2	Leonardo Duque (COL)	Cofidis	s.t.
3	Erik Zabel (GER)	Team Milram	s.t.
4	Rene Mandri (EST)	AG2R Prévoyance	s.t.
5	David López (ESP)	Caisse d'Epargne	s.t.
6	Cadel Evans (AUS)	Predictor–Lotto	s.t.
7	Manuel Beltrán (ESP)	Liquigas	s.t.
8	Xavier Florencio (ESP)	Bouygues Télécom	s.t.
9	Ezequiel Mosquera (ESP)	Karpin–Galicia	s.t.
10	José Ángel Gómez Marchante (ESP)	Saunier Duval–Prodir	s.t.

== Stage 4 ==
4 September 2007 — Langreo to Lakes of Covadonga, 185.1 km (115.0 mi)

Route profile:

Stage 4 result

Rank	Rider	Team	Time
1	Vladimir Efimkin (RUS)	Caisse d'Epargne	4h 39' 56"
2	Leonardo Piepoli (ITA)	Saunier Duval–Prodir	+ 1' 06"
3	Stijn Devolder (BEL)	Discovery Channel	s.t.
4	Denis Menchov (RUS)	Rabobank	s.t.
5	Maxime Monfort (BEL)	Cofidis	s.t.
6	Carlos Sastre (ESP)	Team CSC	s.t.
7	Cadel Evans (AUS)	Predictor–Lotto	+ 1' 28"
8	Sylvain Chavanel (FRA)	Cofidis	+ 1' 33"
9	Ezequiel Mosquera (ESP)	Karpin–Galicia	+ 1' 36"
10	Leonardo Bertagnolli (ITA)	Liquigas	+ 1' 49"

General classification after stage 4

Rank	Rider	Team	Time
1	Vladimir Efimkin (RUS)	Caisse d'Epargne	16h 02' 50"
2	Denis Menchov (RUS)	Rabobank	+ 1' 06"
3	Carlos Sastre (ESP)	Team CSC	s.t.
4	Maxime Monfort (BEL)	Cofidis	s.t.
5	Stijn Devolder (BEL)	Discovery Channel	s.t.
6	Leonardo Piepoli (ITA)	Saunier Duval–Prodir	s.t.
7	Cadel Evans (AUS)	Predictor–Lotto	+ 1' 28"
8	Sylvain Chavanel (FRA)	Cofidis	+ 1' 33"
9	Ezequiel Mosquera (ESP)	Karpin–Galicia	+ 1' 36"
10	Leonardo Bertagnolli (ITA)	Liquigas	+ 1' 49"

== Stage 5 ==
5 September 2007 — Cangas de Onís to Reinosa, 157.4 km (97.8 mi)

Route profile:

Stage 5 result

Rank	Rider	Team	Time
1	Óscar Freire (ESP)	Rabobank	4h 07' 51"
2	Daniele Bennati (ITA)	Lampre–Fondital	s.t.
3	Paolo Bettini (ITA)	Quick-Step–Innergetic	s.t.
4	Philippe Gilbert (BEL)	Française des Jeux	s.t.
5	Erik Zabel (GER)	Team Milram	s.t.
6	Leonardo Duque (COL)	Cofidis	s.t.
7	Xavier Florencio (ESP)	Bouygues Télécom	s.t.
8	Josep Jufré (ESP)	Predictor–Lotto	s.t.
9	Rene Mandri (EST)	AG2R Prévoyance	s.t.
10	David García (ESP)	Karpin–Galicia	s.t.

General classification after stage 5

Rank	Rider	Team	Time
1	Vladimir Efimkin (RUS)	Caisse d'Epargne	20h 10' 41"
2	Denis Menchov (RUS)	Rabobank	+ 1' 06"
3	Carlos Sastre (ESP)	Team CSC	s.t.
4	Maxime Monfort (BEL)	Cofidis	s.t.
5	Stijn Devolder (BEL)	Discovery Channel	s.t.
6	Leonardo Piepoli (ITA)	Saunier Duval–Prodir	s.t.
7	Cadel Evans (AUS)	Predictor–Lotto	+ 1' 28"
8	Sylvain Chavanel (FRA)	Cofidis	+ 1' 33"
9	Ezequiel Mosquera (ESP)	Karpin–Galicia	+ 1' 36"
10	Leonardo Bertagnolli (ITA)	Liquigas	+ 1' 49"

== Stage 6 ==
6 September 2007 — Reinosa to Logroño, 184.3 km (114.5 mi)

Route profile:

Stage 6 result

Rank	Rider	Team	Time
1	Óscar Freire (ESP)	Rabobank	4h 24' 10"
2	Koldo Fernández (ESP)	Euskaltel–Euskadi	s.t.
3	Angelo Furlan (ITA)	Crédit Agricole	s.t.
4	Tom Boonen (BEL)	Quick-Step–Innergetic	s.t.
5	André Korff (GER)	T-Mobile Team	s.t.
6	Alessandro Petacchi (ITA)	Team Milram	s.t.
7	Aurélien Clerc (SUI)	Bouygues Télécom	s.t.
8	André Greipel (GER)	T-Mobile Team	s.t.
9	Francesco Chicchi (ITA)	Liquigas	s.t.
10	Rony Martias (FRA)	Bouygues Télécom	s.t.

General classification after stage 6

Rank	Rider	Team	Time
1	Vladimir Efimkin (RUS)	Caisse d'Epargne	24h 34' 51"
2	Denis Menchov (RUS)	Rabobank	+ 1' 06"
3	Carlos Sastre (ESP)	Team CSC	s.t.
4	Maxime Monfort (BEL)	Cofidis	s.t.
5	Stijn Devolder (BEL)	Discovery Channel	s.t.
6	Leonardo Piepoli (ITA)	Saunier Duval–Prodir	s.t.
7	Cadel Evans (AUS)	Predictor–Lotto	+ 1' 28"
8	Sylvain Chavanel (FRA)	Cofidis	+ 1' 33"
9	Ezequiel Mosquera (ESP)	Karpin–Galicia	+ 1' 36"
10	Leonardo Bertagnolli (ITA)	Liquigas	+ 1' 49"

== Stage 7 ==
7 September 2007 — Calahorra to Zaragoza, 176.3 km (109.5 mi)

Route profile:

Stage 7 result

Rank	Rider	Team	Time
1	Erik Zabel (GER)	Team Milram	3h 52' 05"
2	Allan Davis (AUS)	Discovery Channel	s.t.
3	Paolo Bettini (ITA)	Quick-Step–Innergetic	s.t.
4	Koldo Fernández (ESP)	Euskaltel–Euskadi	s.t.
5	André Korff (GER)	T-Mobile Team	s.t.
6	Philippe Gilbert (BEL)	Française des Jeux	s.t.
7	Andrea Tonti (ITA)	Quick-Step–Innergetic	s.t.
8	Sylvain Chavanel (FRA)	Cofidis	s.t.
9	Luis León Sánchez (ESP)	Caisse d'Epargne	s.t.
10	Alexandre Usov (BLR)	AG2R Prévoyance	s.t.

General classification after stage 7

Rank	Rider	Team	Time
1	Vladimir Efimkin (RUS)	Caisse d'Epargne	28h 26' 56"
2	Denis Menchov (RUS)	Rabobank	+ 1' 06"
3	Carlos Sastre (ESP)	Team CSC	s.t.
4	Maxime Monfort (BEL)	Cofidis	s.t.
5	Stijn Devolder (BEL)	Discovery Channel	s.t.
6	Leonardo Piepoli (ITA)	Saunier Duval–Prodir	s.t.
7	Cadel Evans (AUS)	Predictor–Lotto	+ 1' 28"
8	Sylvain Chavanel (FRA)	Cofidis	+ 1' 33"
9	Ezequiel Mosquera (ESP)	Karpin–Galicia	+ 1' 36"
10	Leonardo Bertagnolli (ITA)	Liquigas	+ 1' 49"

== Stage 8 ==
8 September 2007 — Cariñena to Zaragoza, 52.2 km (32.4 mi) (ITT)

Route profile:

Stage 8 result

Rank	Rider	Team	Time
1	Bert Grabsch (GER)	Team High Road	57' 05"
2	László Bodrogi (HUN)	Crédit Agricole	+ 34"
3	Stijn Devolder (BEL)	Discovery Channel	+ 48"
4	Denis Menchov (RUS)	Rabobank	+ 1' 18"
5	Magnus Bäckstedt (SWE)	Liquigas	+ 1' 37"
6	Stefan Schumacher (GER)	Gerolsteiner	+ 1' 52"
7	Jason McCartney (USA)	Discovery Channel	+ 1' 55"
8	Joost Posthuma (NED)	Rabobank	+ 2' 01"
9	Dimitri Champion (FRA)	Bouygues Télécom	+ 2' 15"
10	Santos González (ESP)	Karpin–Galicia	+ 2' 18"

General classification after stage 8

Rank	Rider	Team	Time
1	Stijn Devolder (BEL)	Discovery Channel	29h 25' 55"
2	Denis Menchov (RUS)	Rabobank	+ 30"
3	Vladimir Efimkin (RUS)	Caisse d'Epargne	+ 1' 28"
4	Cadel Evans (AUS)	Predictor–Lotto	+ 1' 54"
5	Maxime Monfort (BEL)	Cofidis	+ 2' 12"
6	Sylvain Chavanel (FRA)	Cofidis	+ 3' 00"
7	Carlos Sastre (ESP)	Team CSC	+ 3' 15"
8	Carlos Barredo (ESP)	Quick-Step–Innergetic	+ 3' 41"
9	Vladimir Karpets (RUS)	Caisse d'Epargne	+ 3' 44"
10	Leonardo Bertagnolli (ITA)	Liquigas	+ 4' 03"

== Stage 9 ==
9 September 2007 — Huesca to Cerler, 167.6 km (104.1 mi)

Route profile:

Stage 9 result

Rank	Rider	Team	Time
1	Leonardo Piepoli (ITA)	Saunier Duval–Prodir	4h 28' 21"
2	Denis Menchov (RUS)	Rabobank	s.t.
3	Ezequiel Mosquera (ESP)	Karpin–Galicia	+ 17"
4	Carlos Sastre (ESP)	Team CSC	s.t.
5	Oliver Zaugg (SUI)	Gerolsteiner	+ 51"
6	Daniel Moreno (ESP)	Relax–GAM	+ 1' 03"
7	Luis Pérez (ESP)	Andalucía–Cajasur	s.t.
8	Samuel Sánchez (ESP)	Euskaltel–Euskadi	s.t.
9	Vladimir Efimkin (RUS)	Caisse d'Epargne	s.t.
10	Manuel Beltrán (ESP)	Liquigas	s.t.

General classification after stage 9

Rank	Rider	Team	Time
1	Denis Menchov (RUS)	Rabobank	33h 54' 46"
2	Vladimir Efimkin (RUS)	Caisse d'Epargne	+ 2' 01"
3	Cadel Evans (AUS)	Predictor–Lotto	+ 2' 27"
4	Carlos Sastre (ESP)	Team CSC	+ 3' 02"
5	Ezequiel Mosquera (ESP)	Karpin–Galicia	+ 4' 02"
6	Stijn Devolder (BEL)	Discovery Channel	+ 4' 28"
7	Samuel Sánchez (ESP)	Euskaltel–Euskadi	+ 4' 42"
8	Vladimir Karpets (RUS)	Caisse d'Epargne	+ 4' 58"
9	Maxime Monfort (BEL)	Cofidis	+ 5' 07"
10	Carlos Barredo (ESP)	Quick-Step–Innergetic	+ 5' 19"

== Stage 10 ==
10 September 2007 — Benasque to Arcalis, 214 km (133 mi)

Route profile:

Stage 10 result

Rank	Rider	Team	Time
1	Denis Menchov (RUS)	Rabobank	5h 47' 05"
2	Cadel Evans (AUS)	Predictor–Lotto	s.t.
3	Samuel Sánchez (ESP)	Euskaltel–Euskadi	s.t.
4	Manuel Beltrán (ESP)	Liquigas	s.t.
5	Carlos Sastre (ESP)	Team CSC	s.t.
6	Vladimir Efimkin (RUS)	Caisse d'Epargne	s.t.
7	Leonardo Piepoli (ITA)	Saunier Duval–Prodir	s.t.
8	Igor Antón (ESP)	Euskaltel–Euskadi	+ 7"
9	Ezequiel Mosquera (ESP)	Karpin–Galicia	+ 33"
10	Daniel Moreno (ESP)	Relax–GAM	s.t.

General classification after stage 10

Rank	Rider	Team	Time
1	Denis Menchov (RUS)	Rabobank	39h 41' 51"
2	Vladimir Efimkin (RUS)	Caisse d'Epargne	+ 2' 01"
3	Cadel Evans (AUS)	Predictor–Lotto	+ 2' 27"
4	Carlos Sastre (ESP)	Team CSC	+ 3' 02"
5	Ezequiel Mosquera (ESP)	Karpin–Galicia	+ 4' 35"
6	Samuel Sánchez (ESP)	Euskaltel–Euskadi	+ 4' 42"
7	Vladimir Karpets (RUS)	Caisse d'Epargne	+ 5' 49"
8	Manuel Beltrán (ESP)	Liquigas	+ 5' 56"
9	Leonardo Piepoli (ITA)	Saunier Duval–Prodir	+ 6' 06"
10	Stijn Devolder (BEL)	Discovery Channel	+ 6' 28"

== Rest day 1 ==
11 September 2007

== Stage 11 ==
12 September 2007 — Oropesa del Mar to Algemesí, 191.3 km (118.9 mi)

Route profile:

Stage 11 result

Rank	Rider	Team	Time
1	Alessandro Petacchi (ITA)	Team Milram	4h 45' 34"
2	Paolo Bettini (ITA)	Quick-Step–Innergetic	s.t.
3	Erik Zabel (GER)	Team Milram	s.t.
4	André Greipel (GER)	T-Mobile Team	s.t.
5	Carlos Da Cruz (FRA)	Française des Jeux	s.t.
6	Leonardo Duque (COL)	Cofidis	s.t.
7	Allan Davis (AUS)	Discovery Channel	s.t.
8	Daniele Bennati (ITA)	Lampre–Fondital	s.t.
9	Alexandre Usov (BLR)	AG2R Prévoyance	s.t.
10	Alessandro Vanotti (ITA)	Liquigas	s.t.

General classification after stage 11

Rank	Rider	Team	Time
1	Denis Menchov (RUS)	Rabobank	44h 27' 25"
2	Vladimir Efimkin (RUS)	Caisse d'Epargne	+ 2' 01"
3	Cadel Evans (AUS)	Predictor–Lotto	+ 2' 27"
4	Carlos Sastre (ESP)	Team CSC	+ 3' 02"
5	Ezequiel Mosquera (ESP)	Karpin–Galicia	+ 4' 35"
6	Samuel Sánchez (ESP)	Euskaltel–Euskadi	+ 4' 42"
7	Vladimir Karpets (RUS)	Caisse d'Epargne	+ 5' 49"
8	Manuel Beltrán (ESP)	Liquigas	+ 5' 56"
9	Stijn Devolder (BEL)	Discovery Channel	+ 6' 28"
10	Leonardo Piepoli (ITA)	Saunier Duval–Prodir	+ 6' 34"
