= 2007 UCI ProTour =

Cycling competition

- Third edition of the UCI ProTour

Details
- Dates: March 11 – October 20
- Location: Europe
- Races: 26

Champions
- Individual champion: Cadel Evans (AUS) (Predictor–Lotto)
- Teams' champion: Team CSC
- Nations' champion: Spain

The 2007 UCI ProTour was the third year of the UCI ProTour system. Following a dispute and power struggle between the UCI and the organisers of the Grand Tours, ASO, RCS and Unipublic, a number of events were run as ProTour events, although without ProTour licences. Races counted towards the ProTour standings, although the organisers were not obliged to invite all 20 UCI ProTeams, notably not inviting Unibet.com.

After numerous doping scandals in previous years, culminating with Floyd Landis' doping scandal in the 2006 Tour de France, the Phonak team was disbanded when the new title sponsor, iShares, decided to cease sponsoring and pull out of cycling. As of December, 2006, the ProTour license abandoned by Phonak has been granted to the Unibet.com, and the Active Bay group of Manolo Saiz has lost its license, which was given to the Astana. The links between the ProTour and the organisers of the three Grand Tours (ASO, RCS MediaGroup and Unipublic) remain strained.

The 2007 Paris–Nice race was the focus of a dispute between (ASO) and the UCI. ASO have requested that the 2007 edition be downgraded from ProTour status to NE (national calendar status), therefore lacking UCI world-ranking points and threatening the participation of the ProTeams. This was resolved to an extent though and Paris–Nice took place as the first ProTour race of the season, although without Unibet.com.

== 2007 ProTour races ==
Dates	Race	Winner	ProTour leader
March 11–18	(France) Paris–Nice	Alberto Contador (ESP) (Discovery Channel)	Alberto Contador (ESP) (Discovery Channel)
March 14–20	(Italy) Tirreno–Adriatico	Andreas Klöden (GER) (Astana)	Alberto Contador (ESP) (Discovery Channel)
March 24	(Italy) Milan–San Remo	Óscar Freire (ESP) (Rabobank)	Alberto Contador (ESP) (Discovery Channel)
April 8	(Belgium) Tour of Flanders	Alessandro Ballan (ITA) (Lampre–Fondital)	Alberto Contador (ESP) (Discovery Channel)
April 11	(Belgium) Gent–Wevelgem	Marcus Burghardt (GER) (T-Mobile Team)	Óscar Freire (ESP) (Rabobank)
April 9–14	(Spain) Vuelta al País Vasco	Juan José Cobo (ESP) (Saunier Duval–Prodir)	Óscar Freire (ESP) (Rabobank)
April 15	(France) Paris–Roubaix	Stuart O'Grady (AUS) (Team CSC)	Stuart O'Grady (AUS) (Team CSC)
April 22	(Netherlands) Amstel Gold Race	Stefan Schumacher (GER) (Gerolsteiner)	Davide Rebellin (ITA) (Gerolsteiner)
April 25	(Belgium) La Flèche Wallonne	Davide Rebellin (ITA) (Gerolsteiner)	Davide Rebellin (ITA) (Gerolsteiner)
April 29	(Belgium) Liège–Bastogne–Liège	Danilo Di Luca (ITA) (Liquigas)	Davide Rebellin (ITA) (Gerolsteiner)
May 1–6	(Switzerland) Tour de Romandie	Thomas Dekker (NED) (Rabobank)	Davide Rebellin (ITA) (Gerolsteiner)
May 21–27	(Spain) Volta a Catalunya	Vladimir Karpets (RUS) (Caisse d'Epargne)	Davide Rebellin (ITA) (Gerolsteiner)
May 12–June 3	(Italy) Giro d'Italia	Danilo Di Luca (ITA) (Liquigas)	Danilo Di Luca (ITA) (Liquigas)
June 10–17	(France) Dauphiné Libéré	Christophe Moreau (FRA) (Agritubel)	Danilo Di Luca (ITA) (Liquigas)
June 16–24	(Switzerland) Tour de Suisse	Vladimir Karpets (RUS) (Caisse d'Epargne)	Danilo Di Luca (ITA) (Liquigas)
June 24	(Netherlands) TTT Eindhoven	Team CSC	Danilo Di Luca (ITA) (Liquigas)
July 7–29	Tour de France	Alberto Contador (ESP) (Discovery Channel)	Danilo Di Luca (ITA) (Liquigas)
August 4	(Spain) Clásica de San Sebastián	Leonardo Bertagnolli (ITA) (Liquigas)	Danilo Di Luca (ITA) (Liquigas)
August 10–18	(Germany) Deutschland Tour	Jens Voigt (GER) (Team CSC)	Danilo Di Luca (ITA) (Liquigas)
August 19	(Germany) Vattenfall Cyclassics	Alessandro Ballan (ITA) (Lampre–Fondital)	Danilo Di Luca (ITA) (Liquigas)
August 22–29	(Belgium) / (Netherlands) Eneco Tour of Benelux	Iván Gutiérrez (ESP) (Caisse d'Epargne)	Danilo Di Luca (ITA) (Liquigas)
September 2	GP Ouest-France	Thomas Voeckler (FRA) (Bouygues Télécom)	Danilo Di Luca (ITA) (Liquigas)
September 1–23	(Spain) Vuelta a España	Denis Menchov (RUS) (Rabobank)	Danilo Di Luca (ITA) (Liquigas)
September 9–15	(Poland) Tour de Pologne	Johan Van Summeren (BEL) (Predictor–Lotto)	Danilo Di Luca (ITA) (Liquigas)
October 14	(France) Paris–Tours	Alessandro Petacchi (ITA) (Team Milram)	Danilo Di Luca (ITA) (Liquigas)
October 20	(Italy) Giro di Lombardia	Damiano Cunego (ITA) (Lampre–Fondital)	Cadel Evans (AUS) (Predictor–Lotto)

Züri-Metzgete race was scheduled in Switzerland for October 7, but the race was cancelled.

== Teams ==
Code	Official Team Name	Country	Website
ALM	AG2R Prévoyance	France	
AST	Astana	Switzerland	
BTL	Bouygues Télécom	France	
GCE	Caisse d'Epargne	Spain	
COF	Cofidis	France	
C.A	Crédit Agricole	France	
CSC	Team CSC	Denmark	
DSC	Discovery Channel	United States	
PRL	Predictor–Lotto	Belgium	
EUS	Euskaltel–Euskadi	Spain	
FDJ	Française des Jeux	France	
GST	Gerolsteiner	Germany	
LAM	Lampre–Fondital	Italy	
LIQ	Liquigas	Italy	
MRM	Team Milram	Italy	
QSI	Quick-Step–Innergetic	Belgium	
RAB	Rabobank	Netherlands	(in Dutch)
SDV	Saunier Duval–Prodir	Spain	
TMO	T-Mobile Team	Germany	--
UNI	Unibet.com	Sweden	

== Individual standings ==
Final classification
Rank	Name	Team	Points
1	Cadel Evans (AUS)	Predictor–Lotto	247
2	Davide Rebellin (ITA)	Gerolsteiner	197
3	Alberto Contador (ESP)	Discovery Channel	191
4	Alejandro Valverde (ESP)	Caisse d'Epargne	190
5	Óscar Freire (ESP)	Rabobank	182
6	Denis Menchov (RUS)	Rabobank	172
7	Damiano Cunego (ITA)	Lampre–Fondital	165
8	Kim Kirchen (LUX)	Team High Road	165
9	Samuel Sánchez (ESP)	Euskaltel–Euskadi	159
10	Vladimir Karpets (RUS)	Caisse d'Epargne	145
11	Alessandro Ballan (ITA)	Lampre–Fondital	135
12	Carlos Sastre (ESP)	Team CSC	127

- 241 riders have scored at least one point on the 2007 UCI ProTour.

== Team standings ==
Final classification
Rank	Team	Nationality	Points
1	Team CSC	Denmark	392
2	Liquigas	Italy	354
3	Caisse d'Epargne	Spain	337
4	AG2R Prévoyance	France	324
5	Quick-Step–Innergetic	Belgium	310
6	Saunier Duval–Prodir	Spain	306
7	Discovery Channel	United States	300
8	Rabobank	Netherlands	300
9	Predictor–Lotto	Belgium	293
10	Lampre–Fondital	Italy	258
11	Euskaltel–Euskadi	Spain	227
12	Astana	Switzerland	218
13	Team High Road	Germany	212
14	Gerolsteiner	Germany	207
15	Crédit Agricole	France	182
16	Bouygues Télécom	France	178
17	Cofidis	France	177
18	Team Milram	Italy	148
19	Française des Jeux	France	137
20	Unibet.com	Sweden	127

== Nation standings ==
Final standings
Rank	Nation	Points
1	Spain	849
2	Italy	728
3	Australia	520
4	Russia	437
5	Luxembourg	377
6	Germany	337
7	Netherlands	293
8	Belgium	281
9	United States	215
10	France	180

- Riders from 30 nations scored at least one UCI ProTour point

== 2007 ProTour Points System ==
Place	Tour de France	Giro d'Italia Vuelta a España	Milan–San Remo Tour of Flanders Paris–Roubaix Liège–Bastogne–Liège Giro di Lombardia Lesser stage races	Lesser one-day races	Eindhoven Time Trial
Overall Classification
1st	100	85	50	40	10
2nd	75	65	40	30	9
3rd	60	50	35	25	8
4th	55	45	30	20	7
5th	50	40	25	15	6
6th	45	35	20	11	5
7th	40	30	15	7	4
8th	35	26	10	5	3
9th	30	22	5	3	2
10th	25	19	2	1	1
11th	20	16			
12th	15	13			
13th	12	11			
14th	10	9			
15th	8	7			
16th	6	5			
17th	5	4			
18th	4	3			
19th	3	2			
20th	2	1			
Stage wins (if applicable)
1st	10	8	3		
2nd	5	4	2		
3rd	3	2	1		

- If a rider is not part of UCI ProTour, no points are given. The points corresponding to the place are not awarded
- Top 20 teams get points in scale 20-19-18...1.
- Team time trials in stage races doesn't give points for riders.
- In Eindhoven time trial rider has to finish to earn points.
- In country ranking, top 5 riders of each country count towards the ranking.
