= 2007 Vuelta a España =

62nd edition of the cycling race

- Overview of the stages

Race details
- Dates: 1–23 September
- Stages: 21
- Distance: 3,241 km (2,014 mi)
- Winning time: 80h 59' 07"

Results
Jersey awarded to the overall winner	Winner	Denis Menchov (RUS)	(Rabobank)
	Second	Carlos Sastre (ESP)	(Team CSC)
	Third	Samuel Sánchez (ESP)	(Euskaltel–Euskadi)
Jersey awarded to the points classification winner	Points	Daniele Bennati (ITA)	(Lampre–Fondital)
Jersey awarded to the mountains classification winner	Mountains	Denis Menchov (RUS)	(Rabobank)
Jersey awarded to the combination classification winner	Combination	Denis Menchov (RUS)	(Rabobank)
	Team	(Spain) Caisse d'Epargne	

The 2007 Vuelta a España, the 62nd edition of the cycle race, took place from 1 September until 23 September 2007. For the first time in a decade, the race started in the region of Galicia, at Vigo, home to Óscar Pereiro, with a flat stage. It was also an unusual Vuelta because the first summit finish came already on the fourth day of racing, with a stage ending atop the famed Lagos de Covadonga. The race was won by Denis Menchov, who also won the Mountains competition and the combined classification, and finished second in the points competition.

== Participating teams ==
- (Switzerland) ~~Astana~~
- (France) AG2R Prévoyance
- (France) Bouygues Télécom
- (Spain) Caisse d'Epargne
- (France) Cofidis
- (France) Crédit Agricole
- (United States) Discovery Channel
- (Spain) Euskaltel–Euskadi
- (France) Française des Jeux
- (Germany) Gerolsteiner
- (Italy) Lampre–Fondital
- (Italy) Liquigas
- (Belgium) Predictor–Lotto
- (Belgium) Quick-Step–Innergetic
- (Netherlands) Rabobank
- (Spain) Saunier Duval–Prodir
- (Germany) T-Mobile Team
- (Denmark) Team CSC
- (Italy) Team Milram
- (Spain) Andalucía–CajaSur
- (Spain) Karpin–Galicia
- (Spain) Relax–GAM

== Route ==
List of stages
Stage	Date	Course	Distance	Type	Winner
1	1 September	Vigo to Vigo	146.4 km (91 mi)		Daniele Bennati (ITA)
2	2 September	Allariz to Santiago de Compostela	148.7 km (92 mi)		Óscar Freire (ESP)
3	3 September	Viveiro to Luarca	153 km (95 mi)		Paolo Bettini (ITA)
4	4 September	Langreo to Lakes of Covadonga	185.1 km (115 mi)		Vladimir Efimkin (RUS)
5	5 September	Cangas de Onís to Reinosa	157.4 km (98 mi)		Óscar Freire (ESP)
6	6 September	Reinosa to Logroño	184.3 km (115 mi)		Óscar Freire (ESP)
7	7 September	Calahorra to Zaragoza	176.3 km (110 mi)		Erik Zabel (GER)
8	8 September	Cariñena to Zaragoza	52.2 km (32 mi)	Individual time trial	Bert Grabsch (GER)
9	9 September	Huesca to Cerler	167.6 km (104 mi)		Leonardo Piepoli (ITA)
10	10 September	Benasque to Arcalis (Andorra)	214 km (133 mi)		Denis Menchov (RUS)
	11 September			Rest day	
11	12 September	Oropesa del Mar to Algemesí	191.3 km (119 mi)		Alessandro Petacchi (ITA)
12	13 September	Algemesí to Hellín	176 km (109 mi)		Alessandro Petacchi (ITA)
13	14 September	Hellín to Torre-Pacheco	176.4 km (110 mi)		~~Andreas Klier (GER)~~
14	15 September	Puerto Lumbreras to Villacarrillo	207 km (129 mi)		Jason McCartney (USA)
15	16 September	Villacarrillo to Granada	201.4 km (125 mi)		Samuel Sánchez (ESP)
	17 September			Rest day	
16	18 September	Jaén to Puertollano	161.5 km (100 mi)		Leonardo Duque (COL)
17	19 September	Ciudad Real to Talavera de la Reina	175 km (109 mi)		Daniele Bennati (ITA)
18	20 September	Talavera de la Reina to Ávila	153.5 km (95 mi)		Luis Pérez (ESP)
19	21 September	Ávila to Alto de Abantos	133 km (83 mi)		Samuel Sánchez (ESP)
20	22 September	Collado Villalba to Collado Villalba	20 km (12 mi)	Individual time trial	Samuel Sánchez (ESP)
21	23 September	Rivas-Vaciamadrid to Madrid	104.2 km (65 mi)		Daniele Bennati (ITA)
	Total		3,241 km (2,014 mi)		

== Jersey progress ==
Stage (Winner)	General classification	Points Classification	Mountains Classification	Combination Classification	Team Classification
Stage 1 (Daniele Bennati)	Daniele Bennati	Daniele Bennati	Serafín Martínez	Geoffrey Lequatre	Bouygues Télécom
Stage 2 (Óscar Freire)	Óscar Freire	Óscar Freire	Serafín Martínez	Manuel Vazquez	Bouygues Télécom
Stage 3 (Paolo Bettini)	Óscar Freire	Óscar Freire	Serafín Martínez	David de la Fuente	Caisse d'Epargne
Stage 4 (Vladimir Efimkin)	Vladimir Efimkin	Óscar Freire	Serafín Martínez	Vladimir Efimkin	Caisse d'Epargne
Stage 5 (Óscar Freire)	Vladimir Efimkin	Óscar Freire	Serafín Martínez	Vladimir Efimkin	Caisse d'Epargne
Stage 6 (Óscar Freire)	Vladimir Efimkin	Óscar Freire	Serafín Martínez	Vladimir Efimkin	Caisse d'Epargne
Stage 7 (Erik Zabel)	Vladimir Efimkin	Óscar Freire	Serafín Martínez	Vladimir Efimkin	Caisse d'Epargne
Stage 8 (ITT) (Bert Grabsch)	Stijn Devolder	Óscar Freire	Serafín Martínez	Stijn Devolder	Caisse d'Epargne
Stage 9 (Leonardo Piepoli)	Denis Menchov	Óscar Freire	Serafín Martínez	Denis Menchov	Caisse d'Epargne
Stage 10 (Denis Menchov)	Denis Menchov	Paolo Bettini	Denis Menchov	Denis Menchov	Caisse d'Epargne
Stage 11 (Alessandro Petacchi)	Denis Menchov	Paolo Bettini	Denis Menchov	Denis Menchov	Caisse d'Epargne
Stage 12 (Alessandro Petacchi)	Denis Menchov	Paolo Bettini	Denis Menchov	Denis Menchov	Caisse d'Epargne
Stage 13 (Tom Stamsnijder)	Denis Menchov	Paolo Bettini	Denis Menchov	Denis Menchov	Caisse d'Epargne
Stage 14 (Jason McCartney)	Denis Menchov	Paolo Bettini	Denis Menchov	Denis Menchov	Caisse d'Epargne
Stage 15 (Samuel Sánchez)	Denis Menchov	Paolo Bettini	Jurgen Van Goolen	Denis Menchov	Caisse d'Epargne
Stage 16 (Leonardo Duque)	Denis Menchov	Paolo Bettini	Jurgen Van Goolen	Denis Menchov	Caisse d'Epargne
Stage 17 (Daniele Bennati)	Denis Menchov	Paolo Bettini	Jurgen Van Goolen	Denis Menchov	Caisse d'Epargne
Stage 18 (Luis Pérez Rodriguez)	Denis Menchov	Daniele Bennati	Denis Menchov	Denis Menchov	Caisse d'Epargne
Stage 19 (Samuel Sánchez)	Denis Menchov	Daniele Bennati	Denis Menchov	Denis Menchov	Caisse d'Epargne
Stage 20 (Samuel Sánchez)	Denis Menchov	Denis Menchov	Denis Menchov	Denis Menchov	Caisse d'Epargne
Stage 21 (Daniele Bennati)	Denis Menchov	Daniele Bennati	Denis Menchov	Denis Menchov	Caisse d'Epargne

Jersey wearers when same rider is leading more than one classification

- Óscar Freire wore granate jersey on stage 2
- Daniele Bennati wore granate jersey on stage 3
- On stage 4, granate jersey should have been worn by Paolo Bettini, because he was 2nd in classification after Freire, who was also overall leader. However, world champion Bettini was allowed to ride in his usual rainbow jersey.
- Leonardo Piepoli wore white jersey on stages 5–8 and stage 11
- Vladimir Efimkin wore white jersey on stages 9–10, 12–13, 16-18
- Leonardo Piepoli led the KoM classification after stage 11 and should have worn the appropriate jersey on stage 12, but withdrew before its start; therefore, Serafín Martínez wore the mountains jersey on stages 12–14
- Cadel Evans wore white jersey on stages 14–15
- Jurgen Van Goolen wore the mountains jersey on stage 15 and on stages 19–21

== Final standings ==
=== General classification ===
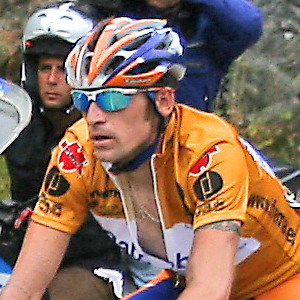
Denis Menchov in the Golden Jersey.

	Cyclist	Team	Time	UCI ProTour Points
1	(Russia) Denis Menchov	RAB	80h 59' 07"	85
2	(Spain) Carlos Sastre	CSC	+ 3' 31"	65
3	(Spain) Samuel Sánchez	EUS	+ 3' 46"	50
4	(Australia) Cadel Evans	PRL	+ 3' 56"	45
5	(Spain) Ezequiel Mosquera	KGZ	+ 6' 34"	N/A
6	(Russia) Vladimir Efimkin	GCE	+ 7' 07"	35
7	(Russia) Vladimir Karpets	GCE	+ 8' 09"	30
8	(Spain) Igor Antón	EUS	+ 8' 44"	26
9	(Spain) Manuel Beltrán	LIQ	+ 9' 38"	22
10	(Spain) Carlos Barredo	QSI	+ 10' 12"	19
11	(Belgium) Maxime Monfort	COF	+ 10' 37"	16
12	(Spain) Daniel Moreno	REG	+ 13' 07"	N/A
13	(France) Stéphane Goubert	A2R	+ 14' 13"	11
14	(Spain) David López	GCE	+ 17' 36"	9
15	(Switzerland) Oliver Zaugg	GST	+ 19' 00"	7
16	(France) Sylvain Chavanel	COF	+ 22' 19"	5
17	(France) Hubert Dupont	A2R	+ 29' 33"	4
18	(Spain) Luis Pérez Rodriguez	ACA	+ 31' 41"	N/A
19	(Denmark) Chris Anker Sørensen	CSC	+ 32' 24"	2
20	(France) Ludovic Turpin	A2R	+ 32' 39"	1

=== KOM Classification ===
	Cyclist	Team	Points
1	(Russia) Denis Menchov	RAB	90
2	(Belgium) Jurgen Van Goolen	DSC	78
3	(Spain) Carlos Sastre	CSC	69

=== Points Classification ===
	Cyclist	Team	Points
1	(Italy) Daniele Bennati	LAM	147
2	(Russia) Denis Menchov	RAB	135
3	(Spain) Samuel Sánchez	EUS	127

=== Team classification ===
	Team	Country	Time
1	Caisse d'Epargne	Spain	242h 55' 05"
2	Euskaltel–Euskadi	Spain	+ 12' 43"
3	AG2R Prévoyance	France	+ 30' 25"

=== Withdrawals ===
Type	Stage	Rider	Team	Reason
DNF	1	(United States) Tom Danielson	Discovery Channel	Injury due to crash
DNF	3	(France) Mathieu Claude	Bouygues Télécom	Fractured collarbone
DNS	4	(Italy) Lorenzo Bernucci	T-Mobile Team	Positive doping test in 2007 Deutschland Tour
DNS	5	(Portugal) Sérgio Paulinho	Discovery Channel	
DNF	5	(France) Rémi Pauriol	Crédit Agricole	
DNF	5	(France) Giovanni Bernaudeau	Bouygues Télécom	Influenza
DNF	7	(Spain) Alberto Fernández	Saunier Duval–Prodir	Knee pain
DNF	7	(Belgium) Bert Roesems	Predictor–Lotto	Crashed
DNF	9	(Spain) Óscar Pereiro	Caisse d'Epargne	Gastroenteritis
DNF	9	(Italy) Francesco Chicchi	Liquigas	
DNF	9	(Australia) Bradley McGee	Française des Jeux	
DNF	9	(Spain) Arkaitz Durán	Saunier Duval–Prodir	Hip pain
DNS	10	(Spain) Óscar Freire	Rabobank	Concentrating on World Championships
DNF	10	(Slovenia) Janez Brajkovič	Discovery Channel	
DNF	10	(South Africa) Ian McLeod	Française des Jeux	
DNF	10	(Italy) Paolo Tiralongo	Lampre–Fondital	
DNS	12	(Italy) Leonardo Piepoli	Saunier Duval–Prodir	Family reasons
DNS	13	(Belgium) Tom Boonen	Quick-Step	
DNS	13	(Italy) Davide Rebellin	Gerolsteiner	Concentrating on World Championships
DNS	13	(Spain) Xavier Florencio	Bouygues Télécom	Concentrating on World Championships
DNS	14	(Spain) Carlos Castaño	Karpin–Galicia	
DNS	14	(Denmark) Michael Blaudzun	Team CSC	
DNF	14	(Italy) Pietro Caucchioli	Crédit Agricole	
DNF	14	(Italy) Angelo Furlan	Crédit Agricole	
DNF	14	(Spain) Serafín Martínez	Karpin–Galicia	
DNF	14	(Spain) Josep Jufré	Predictor–Lotto	Injury due to crash
DNF	14	(France) Dimitri Champion	Bouygues Télécom	Gastric problems
DNF	14	(Spain) Jesús Hernández	Relax–GAM	
DNS	15	(France) Mickaël Delage	Française des Jeux	
DNF	15	(Switzerland) Aurélien Clerc	Bouygues Télécom	Gastric problems
DNF	15	(Germany) Andreas Klier	T-Mobile Team	
DNS	16	(Italy) Damiano Cunego	Lampre–Fondital	
DNS	17	(Italy) Giuseppe Guerini	T-Mobile Team	Illness
DNS	17	(Germany) Bert Grabsch	T-Mobile Team	
DNS	18	(Hungary) László Bodrogi	Crédit Agricole	
DNS	18	(Australia) Allan Davis	Discovery Channel	
DNS	18	(Germany) Stefan Schumacher	Gerolsteiner	
DNS	18	(Italy) Paolo Bettini	Quick-Step–Innergetic	Concentrating on World Championships
DNS	19	(Belgium) Stijn Devolder	Discovery Channel	
DNS	19	(Italy) Andrea Tonti	Quick-Step–Innergetic	
