= 2007 Vuelta a Murcia =

Race details
- Dates: 7–11 March 2007
- Stages: 5
- Distance: 486.5 km (302.3 mi)
- Winning time: 11h 45' 41"

Results
	Winner	Alejandro Valverde (ESP)
	Second	Ángel Vicioso (ESP)
	Third	Manuel Lloret (ESP)

The 2007 Vuelta a Murcia was the 23rd edition of the Vuelta a Murcia cycle race and was held on 7 March to 11 March 2007. The race started in San Pedro del Pinatar and finished in Murcia. The race was won by Alejandro Valverde.

== General classification ==
Final general classification

Rank	Rider	Time
1	Alejandro Valverde (ESP)	11h 45' 41"
2	Ángel Vicioso (ESP)	+ 35"
3	Manuel Lloret (ESP)	+ 52"
4	Koldo Gil (ESP)	+ 1' 07"
5	Michele Scarponi (ITA)	+ 1' 09"
6	Jens Voigt (GER)	+ 1' 10"
7	Stefano Garzelli (ITA)	+ 1' 17"
8	Denis Menchov (RUS)	+ 1' 23"
9	Damiano Cunego (ITA)	+ 1' 23"
10	Vladimir Karpets (RUS)	+ 1' 37"
