= 2008 Clásica de San Sebastián =

2008 UCI ProTour, race 10 of 15

Race details
- Dates: August 2, 2008
- Stages: 1
- Distance: 225 km (139.8 mi)
- Winning time: 5h 29' 10"

Results
	Winner	Alejandro Valverde (ESP)	(Caisse d'Epargne)
	Second	Alexandr Kolobnev (RUS)	(CSC–Saxo Bank)
	Third	Davide Rebellin (ITA)	(Gerolsteiner)

The 2008 Clásica de San Sebastián, the 28th edition of the Clásica de San Sebastián road cycling race took place on August 2, 2008 in Spain and was won by Spaniard Alejandro Valverde of Caisse d'Epargne in a sprint finish on the Donostia avenue. He held off Russian Alexandr Kolobnev of Team CSC Saxo Bank and Italian Davide Rebellin of Gerolsteiner, from a group that had shrunk to less than 15 riders. Rebellin tried several times to avoid a sprint, but the winner of 1997 could not get away.

== General Standings ==
Rank	Cyclist	Team	Time	UCI ProTour Points
1	Alejandro Valverde (ESP)	Caisse d'Epargne	5h 29' 10"	40
2	Alexandr Kolobnev (RUS)	CSC–Saxo Bank	s.t.	30
3	Davide Rebellin (ITA)	Gerolsteiner	s.t.	25
4	Paolo Bettini (ITA)	Quick-Step	s.t.	20
5	Franco Pellizotti (ITA)	Liquigas	s.t.	15
6	Denis Menchov (RUS)	Rabobank	s.t.	11
7	Samuel Sánchez (ESP)	Euskaltel–Euskadi	s.t.	7
8	Stéphane Goubert (FRA)	Ag2r–La Mondiale	+ 2"	5
9	Haimar Zubeldia (ESP)	Euskaltel–Euskadi	+ 2"	3
10	David Moncoutié (FRA)	Cofidis	+ 2"	1

== See also ==
2008 in road cycling
