= 2007 Volta a Catalunya =

Race details
- Dates: 21–27 May 2007
- Stages: 7
- Distance: 884.4 km (549.5 mi)
- Winning time: 22h 21' 05"

Results
	Winner	Vladimir Karpets (RUS)	(Caisse d'Epargne)
	Second	Michael Rogers (AUS)	(T-Mobile Team)
	Third	Denis Menchov (RUS)	(Rabobank)
	Points	Denis Menchov (RUS)	(Rabobank)
	Mountains	Luis Pasamontes (ESP)	(Unibet.com)
	Sprints	Víctor Hugo Peña (COL)	(Unibet.com)
	Team	(Spain) Relax–GAM	

The 2007 Volta a Catalunya was the 87th edition of the Volta a Catalunya road cycling race, which took place from 21 May to 27 May 2007, in Catalonia. The race began in Salou with a team time trial and ended in Barcelona. The race was won by Russian Vladimir Karpets of the Caisse d'Epargne team, who won the race thanks to winning the team time trial, and second placings on the toughest mountain stage (stage 4) and the mountain time trial (stage 5). The race also saw the first UCI ProTour victories for young British sprinter Mark Cavendish of the T-Mobile Team, when he took stages 2 and 6.

Twenty-five teams took part. The five wildcards have were awarded to Karpin–Galicia, Relax–GAM, Andalucía–CajaSur, Fuerteventura–Canarias and Slipstream–Chipotle.

== Teams ==
Twenty-five teams of up to eight riders started the race:

- Saunier Duval–Prodir
- Caisse d'Epargne
- Astana
- Discovery Channel
- Rabobank
- Euskaltel–Euskadi
- AG2R Prévoyance
- Bouygues Télécom
- Cofidis
- Quick-Step–Innergetic
- Française des Jeux
- Lampre–Fondital
- Liquigas
- Unibet.com
- T-Mobile Team
- Team CSC
- Team Milram
- Crédit Agricole
- Predictor–Lotto
- Gerolsteiner
- Relax–GAM
- Karpin–Galicia
- Andalucía–Cajasur
- Fuerteventura–Canarias
- Slipstream–Chipotle

== Route ==
Stage characteristics and winners
Stage	Date	Course	Distance	Type	Winner
1	21 May	Salou to Salou	15.7 km (9.8 mi)	Team time trial	Caisse d'Epargne
2	22 May	Salou to Perafort	170 km (105.6 mi)		Mark Cavendish (GBR)
3	23 May	Perafort to Tàrrega	182.1 km (113.2 mi)		Allan Davis (AUS)
4	24 May	Tàrrega to Vallnord-Arinsal	203.1 km (126.2 mi)		Óscar Sevilla (ESP)
5	25 May	Sornàs to Vallnord-Arcalís	17.1 km (10.6 mi)	Individual time trial	Denis Menchov (RUS)
6	26 May	Llívia to Lloret de Mar	177.1 km (110.0 mi)		Mark Cavendish (GBR)
7	27 May	Lloret de Mar to Barcelona	119.3 km (74.1 mi)		Samuel Sánchez (ESP)

== Stages ==
=== Stage 1 ===
21 May 2007: Salou to Salou, 15.7 km (9.8 mi) (TTT)

Stage 1 result

	Team	Time
1	(Spain) Caisse d'Epargne	16' 54"
2	(Denmark) Team CSC	+ 16"
3	(Switzerland) Astana	+ 17"

General Classification after Stage 1

	Cyclist	Team	Time
1	Vladimir Karpets (RUS)	Caisse d'Epargne	16' 54"
2	Óscar Pereiro (ESP)	Caisse d'Epargne	s.t.
3	Iván Gutiérrez (ESP)	Caisse d'Epargne	s.t.

=== Stage 2 ===
22 May 2007: Salou to Perafort, 170 km (110 mi)

Stage 2 result

	Cyclist	Team	Time	UCI Points
1	Mark Cavendish (GBR)	T-Mobile Team	4h 01' 47"	3 pts
2	Aaron Kemps (AUS)	Astana	s.t.	2 pts
3	Leonardo Duque (COL)	Cofidis	s.t.	1 pt

General Classification after Stage 2

	Cyclist	Team	Time
1	Imanol Erviti (ESP)	Caisse d'Epargne	4h 18' 40"
2	Iván Gutiérrez (ESP)	Caisse d'Epargne	+ 1"
3	Vladimir Karpets (RUS)	Caisse d'Epargne	+ 1"

=== Stage 3 ===
23 May 2007: Perafort to Tàrrega, 182.1 km (113.2 mi)

Stage 3 result

	Cyclist	Team	Time	UCI Points
1	Allan Davis (AUS)	Discovery Channel	4h 29' 26"	3 pts
2	Baden Cooke (AUS)	Unibet.com	s.t.	2 pts
3	Daniele Bennati (ITA)	Lampre–Fondital	s.t.	1 pt

General Classification after Stage 3

	Cyclist	Team	Time
1	Imanol Erviti (ESP)	Caisse d'Epargne	8h 48' 06"
2	Iván Gutiérrez (ESP)	Caisse d'Epargne	+ 1"
3	Vladimir Karpets (RUS)	Caisse d'Epargne	+ 1"

=== Stage 4 ===
24 May 2007: Tàrrega to Vallnord-Arinsal (Andorra), 201.1 km (125.0 mi)

Stage 4 result

	Cyclist	Team	Time	UCI Points
1	Óscar Sevilla (ESP)	Relax–GAM	6h 06' 43"	N/A
2	Michael Rogers (AUS)	T-Mobile Team	+ 33"	2 pts
3	Christophe Moreau (FRA)	AG2R Prévoyance	+ 34"	1 pt

General Classification after Stage 4

	Cyclist	Team	Time
1	Óscar Sevilla (ESP)	Relax–GAM	14h 55' 22"
2	Vladimir Karpets (RUS)	Caisse d'Epargne	+ 31"
3	Michael Rogers (AUS)	T-Mobile Team	+ 35"

=== Stage 5 ===
25 May 2007: Sornas to Vallnord-Arcalís (Andorra), 17.1 km (10.6 mi) (ITT)

Stage 5 result

	Cyclist	Team	Time	UCI Points
1	Denis Menchov (RUS)	Rabobank	38' 58"	3 pts
2	Vladimir Karpets (RUS)	Caisse d'Epargne	+ 4"	2 pts
3	Rémy Di Gregorio (FRA)	Française des Jeux	+ 24"	1 pt

General Classification after Stage 5

	Cyclist	Team	Time
1	Vladimir Karpets (RUS)	Caisse d'Epargne	15h 34' 55"
2	Denis Menchov (RUS)	Rabobank	+ 16"
3	Michael Rogers (AUS)	T-Mobile Team	+ 40"

=== Stage 6 ===
26 May 2007: Llívia to Lloret de Mar, 177.1 km (110.0 mi)

Stage 6 result

	Cyclist	Team	Time	UCI Points
1	Mark Cavendish (GBR)	T-Mobile Team	3h 59' 55"	3 pts
2	Leonardo Duque (COL)	Cofidis	s.t.	2 pts
3	Paolo Bossoni (ITA)	Lampre–Fondital	s.t.	1 pt

General Classification after Stage 6

	Cyclist	Team	Time
1	Vladimir Karpets (RUS)	Caisse d'Epargne	19h 34' 50"
2	Michael Rogers (AUS)	T-Mobile Team	+ 40"
3	Denis Menchov (RUS)	Rabobank	+ 44"

=== Stage 7 ===
27 May 2007: Lloret de Mar to Barcelona, 119.3 km (74.1 mi)

Stage 7 result

	Cyclist	Team	Time	UCI Points
1	Samuel Sánchez (ESP)	Euskaltel–Euskadi	2h 46' 06"	3 pts
2	Alexander Vinokourov (KAZ)	Astana	+ 5"	2 pts
3	Denis Menchov (RUS)	Rabobank	+ 9"	1 pt

General Classification after Stage 7

	Cyclist	Team	Time
1	Vladimir Karpets (RUS)	Caisse d'Epargne	22h 21' 05"
2	Michael Rogers (AUS)	T-Mobile Team	+ 40"
3	Denis Menchov (RUS)	Rabobank	+ 40"

== Final standing ==
=== General classification ===
	Cyclist	Country	Team	Time	UCI Points
1	Vladimir Karpets	Russia	Caisse d'Epargne	22h 21' 05"	50
2	Michael Rogers	Australia	T-Mobile Team	+ 40"	40
3	Denis Menchov	Russia	Rabobank	+ 40"	35
4	Christophe Moreau	France	AG2R Prévoyance	+ 1' 34"	30
5	Óscar Sevilla	Spain	Relax–GAM	+ 1' 34"	N/A
6	Francisco Mancebo	Spain	Relax–GAM	+ 1' 59"	N/A
7	John Gadret	France	AG2R Prévoyance	+ 2' 19"	15
8	Marcos-Antonio Serrano	Spain	Karpin–Galicia	+ 2' 39"	N/A
9	Laurens ten Dam	Netherlands	Unibet.com	+ 2' 44"	5
10	Janez Brajkovič	Slovenia	Discovery Channel	+ 2' 47"	2

=== Mountains classification ===
	Cyclist	Country	Team	Points
1	Luis Pasamontes	Spain	Unibet.com	86
2	Denis Menchov	Russia	Rabobank	51
3	Eladio Jiménez	Spain	Karpin–Galicia	43

=== Points classification ===
	Cyclist	Country	Team	Points
1	Denis Menchov	Russia	Rabobank	55
2	Mark Cavendish	Great Britain	T-Mobile Team	50
3	Michael Rogers	Australia	T-Mobile Team	41

=== Sprints classification ===
	Cyclist	Country	Team	Points
1	Víctor Hugo Peña	Colombia	Unibet.com	9
2	Francisco José Martínez	Spain	Andalucía–CajaSur	7
3	José Ruiz	Spain	Andalucía–CajaSur	6

=== Team classification ===
	Team	Country	Time
1	Relax–GAM	Spain	67h 10' 29"
2	AG2R Prévoyance	France	+ 1' 13"
3	Unibet.com	Sweden	+ 3' 07"

== Jersey progress ==
Stage (Winner)	General Classification	Mountains Classification	Points Classification	Sprints classification	Team Classification
Stage 1 (TTT) (Caisse d'Epargne)	Vladimir Karpets	no award	no award	no award	Caisse d'Epargne
Stage 2 (Mark Cavendish)	Imanol Erviti	Francisco José Martínez	Mark Cavendish	Víctor Hugo Peña	Caisse d'Epargne
Stage 3 (Allan Davis)	Imanol Erviti	Francisco José Martínez	Baden Cooke	Víctor Hugo Peña	Caisse d'Epargne
Stage 4 (Óscar Sevilla)	Óscar Sevilla	Luis Pasamontes	Baden Cooke	Luis Pasamontes	Relax–GAM
Stage 5 (ITT) (Denis Menchov)	Vladimir Karpets	Luis Pasamontes	Denis Menchov	Luis Pasamontes	Relax–GAM
Stage 6 (Mark Cavendish)	Vladimir Karpets	Luis Pasamontes	Mark Cavendish	Víctor Hugo Peña	Relax–GAM
Stage 7 (Samuel Sánchez)	Vladimir Karpets	Luis Pasamontes	Denis Menchov	Víctor Hugo Peña	Relax–GAM
Final	Vladimir Karpets	Luis Pasamontes	Denis Menchov	Víctor Hugo Peña	Relax–GAM

== Individual 2007 UCI ProTour standings after race ==
As of 27 May 2007, after the Volta a Catalunya

While the top 10 places remain the same, race winner Vladimir Karpets moves into 13th position.

Rank	Previous Rank	Name	Nationality	Team	Points
1	1	Davide Rebellin	Italy	Gerolsteiner	157
2	2	Alejandro Valverde	Spain	Caisse d'Epargne	107
3	3	Danilo Di Luca	Italy	Liquigas	100
4	4	Óscar Freire	Spain	Rabobank	82
5	5	Stuart O'Grady	Australia	Team CSC	79
6	6	Stefan Schumacher	Germany	Gerolsteiner	75
7	7	Fränk Schleck	Luxembourg	Team CSC	63
8	8	Juan José Cobo	Spain	Saunier Duval–Prodir	62
9	9	Alberto Contador	Spain	Discovery Channel	58
10	10	Tom Boonen	Belgium	Quick-Step–Innergetic	57
11	11	Thomas Dekker	Netherlands	Rabobank	55
12	12	Andreas Klöden	Germany	Astana	53
13	-	Vladimir Karpets	Russia	Caisse d'Epargne	52
14	13	Alessandro Ballan	Italy	Lampre–Fondital	50
15	14	Matthias Kessler	Germany	Astana	50

- 103 riders (up from 93 riders) have scored at least one point on the 2007 UCI ProTour.
