= 2007 Clásica de San Sebastián =

Race details
- Dates: August 4, 2007
- Stages: 1
- Distance: 225 km (139.8 mi)
- Winning time: 5h 12' 43"

Results
	Winner	Juan Manuel Gárate (ESP)	(Quick-Step–Innergetic)
	Second	Alejandro Valverde (ESP)	(Caisse d'Epargne)
	Third	Alessandro Ballan (ITA)	(Lampre–Fondital)

The 2007 Clásica de San Sebastián cycle race took place in the Basque city of San Sebastián on August 4, 2007. Leonardo Bertagnolli was the winner but in 2012 he was disqualified by UCI for every result from 1 January 2003 to 18 May 2011.

== General Standings ==
	Cyclist	Team	Time	UCI ProTour Points
DSQ	~~Leonardo Bertagnolli (ITA)~~	~~Liquigas~~	~~5h 12' 43"~~	~~40~~
1	Juan Manuel Gárate (ESP)	Quick-Step–Innergetic	5h 12' 43"	40
2	Alejandro Valverde (ESP)	Caisse d'Epargne	+ 18"	30
3	Alessandro Ballan (ITA)	Lampre–Fondital	+ 18"	25
4	Carlos Barredo (ESP)	Quick-Step–Innergetic	+ 18"	20
5	Mikel Astarloza (ESP)	Euskaltel–Euskadi	+ 18"	15
6	Carlos Sastre (ESP)	Team CSC	+ 18"	11
7	Iñigo Landaluze (ESP)	Euskaltel–Euskadi	+ 28"	7
8	Xavier Florencio (ESP)	Bouygues Télécom	+ 28"	5
9	Giovanni Visconti (ITA)	Quick-Step–Innergetic	+ 37"	3
10	Davide Rebellin (ITA)	Silence–Lotto	s.t.	1
