= Stéphane Goubert =

French cyclist (born 1970)

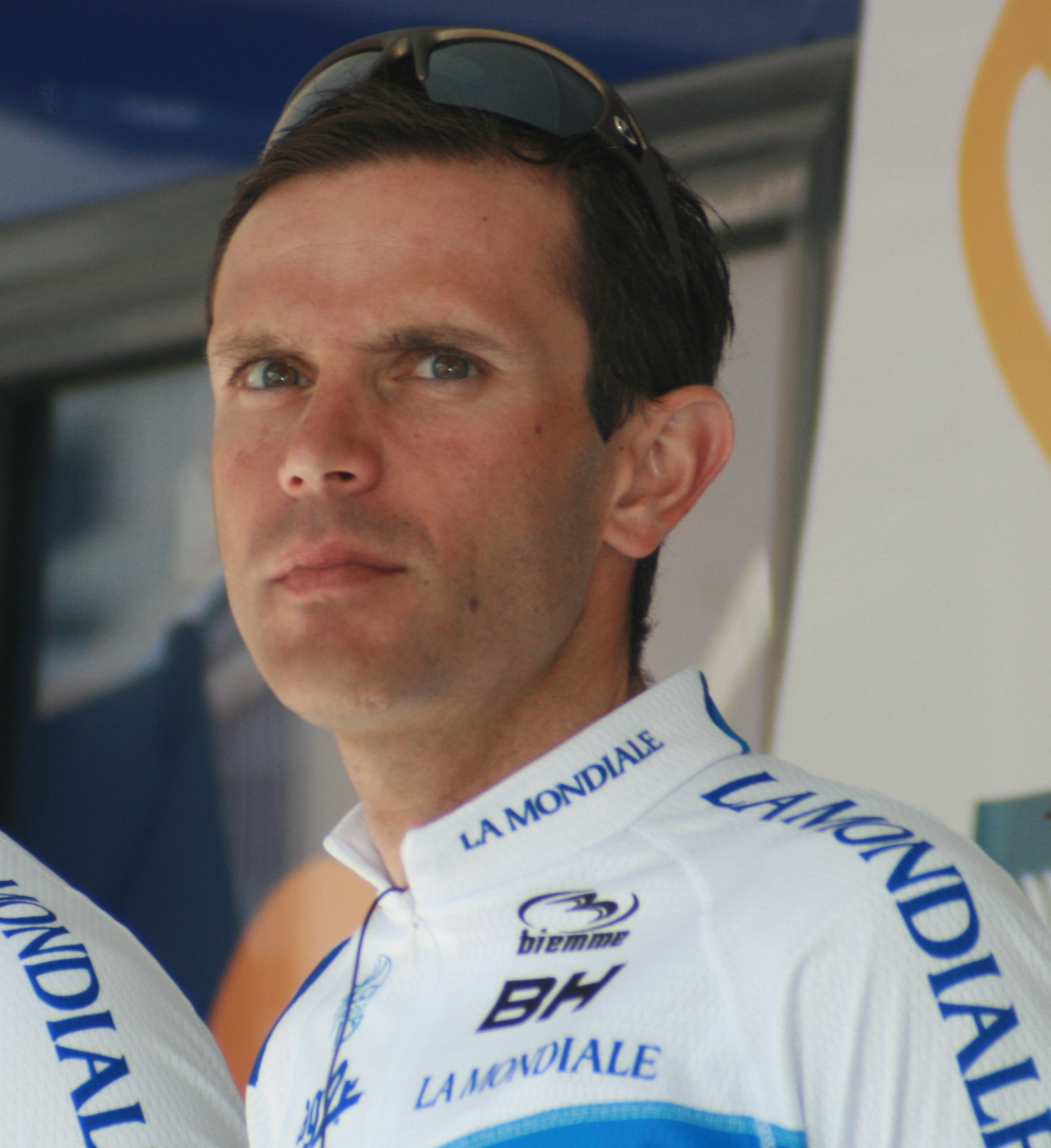

Personal information
- Full name: Stéphane Goubert
- Born: 13 March 1970 (age 56) Montpellier, France
- Height: 1.78 m (5 ft 10 in)
- Weight: 62 kg (137 lb)

Cycling career
- Sport: Cycling
- Current team: Decathlon CMA CGM Team
- Discipline: Road
- Role: Rider (retired); Directeur sportif
- Rider type: Climbing specialist

Professional teams
- 1994–1996: Festina–Lotus
- 1997–1998: Cofidis
- 1999–2000: Team Polti
- 2001–2003: Jean Delatour
- 2004–2009: AG2R Prévoyance

Managerial team
- 2012–: Ag2r–La Mondiale

Stéphane Goubert (born 13 March 1970) is a French retired professional road bicycle racer. He finished in the top 20 of the Tour de France 3 times, with his highest finish being 16th in 2009, but he never managed to claim an individual win. He currently works for Decathlon CMA CGM Team as an Assistant Sports Director. Goubert was sports director at the 2020 Vuelta a España. In 2007 Goubert placed the highest out of all French riders in the 2007 Tour de France and 2007 Vuelta a España.

== Major results ==
1995
7th Japan Cup Cycle Road Race
8th Paris–Camembert
1996
6th Overall Tour Méditerranéen
10th Overall Route du Sud
2002
4th Overall Route du Sud
5th A Travers le Morbihan
2003
4th Tour du Haut Var
10th A Travers le Morbihan
2004
1st Mountains classification Route du Sud
2005
7th Overall Vuelta a Castilla y León

1st Stage 3 (TTT)

7th Grand Prix d'Ouverture La Marseillaise
9th Overall Bayern Rundfahrt
2006
8th Overall Route du Sud
2007
9th Overall Tour du Limousin
10th Grand Prix de Plumelec-Morbihan
2008
2nd GP de Fourmies
3rd Overall Tour de l'Ain
8th Clásica de San Sebastián
8th Overall Four Days of Dunkirk

=== Grand Tour general classification results timeline ===
Grand Tour	1995	1996	1997	1998	1999	2000	2001	2002	2003	2004	2005	2006	2007	2008	2009
Giro d'Italia	—	—	—	—	DNF	—	—	—	—	—	—	—	—	—	—
Tour de France	—	—	—	—	74	—	31	17	31	20	34	36	27	20	14
Vuelta a España	26	DNF	—	DNF	—	—	—	—	—	DNF	—	29	13	—	—
