= Carlos Barredo =

Spanish cyclist (born 1981)

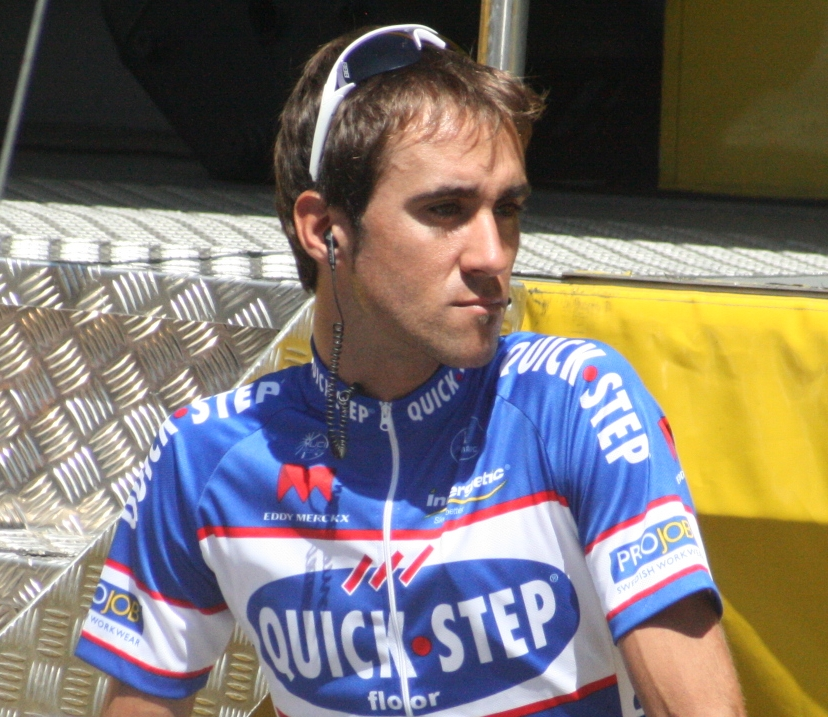
- Barredo at the 2010 Tour de France.

Personal information
- Full name: Carlos Barredo Llamazales
- Born: 5 June 1981 (age 45) Oviedo, Spain
- Height: 1.77 m (5 ft 10 in)
- Weight: 61 kg (134 lb; 9.6 st)

Cycling career
- Sport: Cycling
- Current team: Retired
- Discipline: Road

Professional teams
- 2004–2006: Liberty Seguros
- 2007–2010: Quick-Step–Innergetic
- 2011–2012: Rabobank

Carlos Barredo Llamazales (born 5 June 1981, in Oviedo, Asturias) is a Spanish former road racing cyclist, who competed as a professional between 2004 and 2012. He was issued a suspension for the first two months of the 2011 season in response to a fight with Rui Costa after a 2010 Tour de France stage, with Barredo claiming that Costa had ridden dangerously in the final stages of the race, but later apologising for his actions.

== Doping ==
Barredo was suspended by Rabobank on 18 October 2012 after the UCI opened proceedings for apparent violations of the Anti-Doping Rules on the basis of the information provided by the blood profile in his biological passport. In December of that year, he told Spanish newspaper El País that he was retiring from cycling and that he was starting a new job in a café in Madrid. UCI gave him a two-year sanction as a result of abnormalities in his biological passport, and he was disqualified from 26 October 2007 to 24 September 2011.

== Major results ==
2004 - Liberty Seguros
1st Stage 3 Vuelta a Asturias

2005 - Liberty Seguros
Three Days of De Panne
3rd Grand Prix Pino Cerami
7th Overall Eneco Tour

2006 - Team Wurth
1st Stage 3 Tour Down Under

2007 - Quickstep-Innergetic
5th Clásica de San Sebastián
10th Overall Vuelta a España

2008 - Quickstep-Innergetic
~~5th GP Lugano~~
~~8th Overall Paris–Nice~~

~~1st Stage 5~~

2009 - Quickstep-Innergetic
~~1st Clásica de San Sebastián~~

2010 - Quickstep-Innergetic
~~1st Stage 15 Vuelta a España~~
~~9th Giro di Lombardia~~

2011 - Rabobank
~~2nd Clásica de San Sebastián~~

2012 - Rabobank
3rd Overall Tour of Belgium
