= Vladimir Efimkin =

Russian road bicycle racer

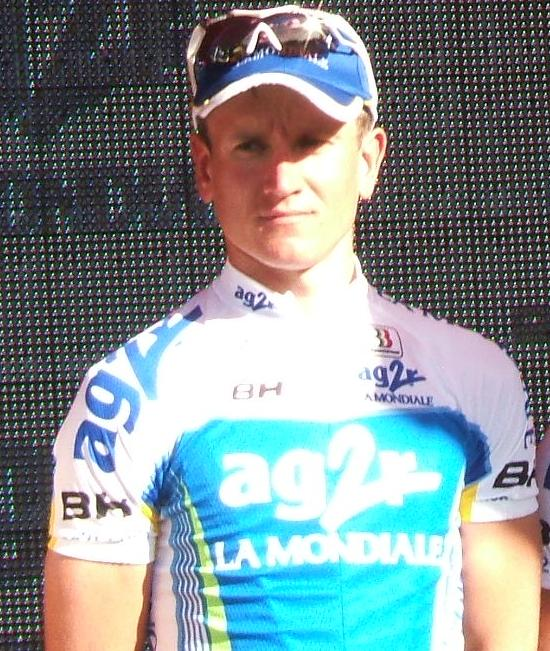

Personal information
- Full name: Vladimir Alexandrovich Efimkin
- Born: December 2, 1981 (age 44) Kuybyshev, Russian SFSR, Soviet Union
- Height: 1.80 m (5 ft 11 in)
- Weight: 68 kg (150 lb)

Cycling career
- Sport: Cycling
- Discipline: Road
- Role: Rider

Professional teams
- 2005: Barloworld
- 2006–2007: Caisse d'Epargne–Illes Balears
- 2008–2010: Ag2r–La Mondiale
- 2011: Team Type 1–Sanofi

Major wins
- Tour de France, 1 stage (2008); Vuelta a España, 1 stage (2007); Volta a Portugal (2005)

Vladimir Alexandrovich Efimkin (Russian: Владимир Александрович Ефимкин) (born December 2, 1981, in Kuybyshev) is a Russian retired professional road bicycle racer, who last rode alongside his twin brother Alexander Efimkin on Team Type 1–Sanofi. He had established himself as a solid all-around cyclist.

== Biography ==
In 2005, his first year has a pro, Efimkin started with solid results in April and May, with a huge performance in the Four Days of Dunkirk, where he won a stage and almost won the overall classification, finishing second. However, his major title of the season only came in August, where he won the Volta a Portugal. After a fabulous breakaway in one of the queen stages, and benefiting from the passivity of the peloton (that were known to underrate the unknown Russian), he captured the yellow jersey and kept it until the end.

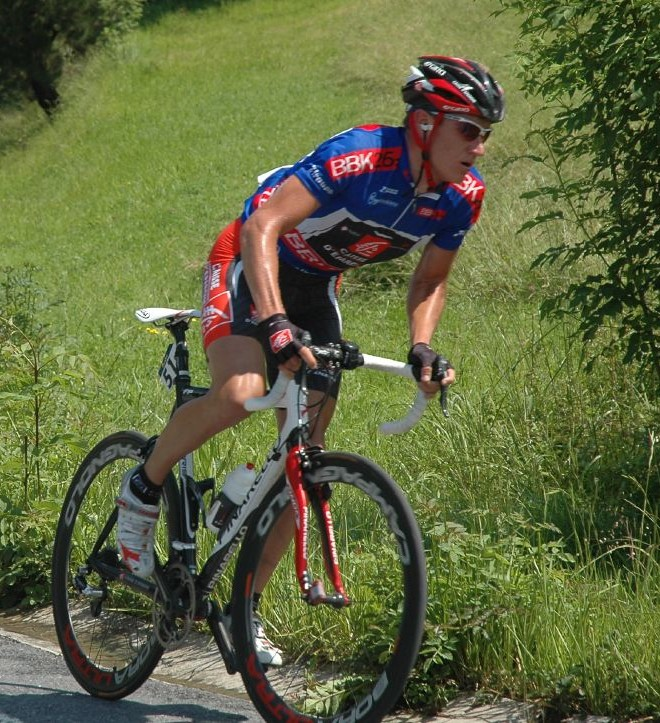
Efimkin on a climb

In 2006, he joined Caisse d'Epargne–Illes Balears, but was used more as a domestique. His main achievement was a second place in the 10th stage of the Giro d'Italia and a 3rd place in the overall classification of the Vuelta a La Rioja.

Efimkin finally exploded in a major competition in 2007. After finishing 6th place in the Tour de Suisse, he made a great Vuelta a España, winning in the summit finish of the Lagos de Covadonga. He wore the golden jersey for some days and was able to finish in the 6th position of the overall.

In 2008, Efimkin joined the French Ag2r–La Mondiale team, where he was one of the leaders for the Tour de France. It is possible he will be awarded a stage win from the 2008 Tour, having finished second to Riccardo Riccò during stage 9, with Riccò's subsequent positive doping test potentially disqualifying him of the victory. He finished in 11th place overall.

Efimkin quit cycling in the middle of the 2010 season, but came back in 2011 to ride along with his brother for Team Type 1–Sanofi. After one year of racing, he quit again.

== Major results ==
2005
1st overall and 1 stage Volta a Portugal
2nd overall and 1 stage Four Days of Dunkirk
1 stage and 4th overall Vuelta a Aragón
2006
3rd overall Vuelta a La Rioja
2007
1 stage, Vuelta a España
6th overall, Vuelta a España
1 stage, Euskal Bizikleta
6th overall 2007 Tour de Suisse
2008
11th overall Tour de France

1st, Stage 9

2009
Aggressive rider stage 4 2009 Tour Down Under
