= Vladimir Karpets =

Russian cyclist

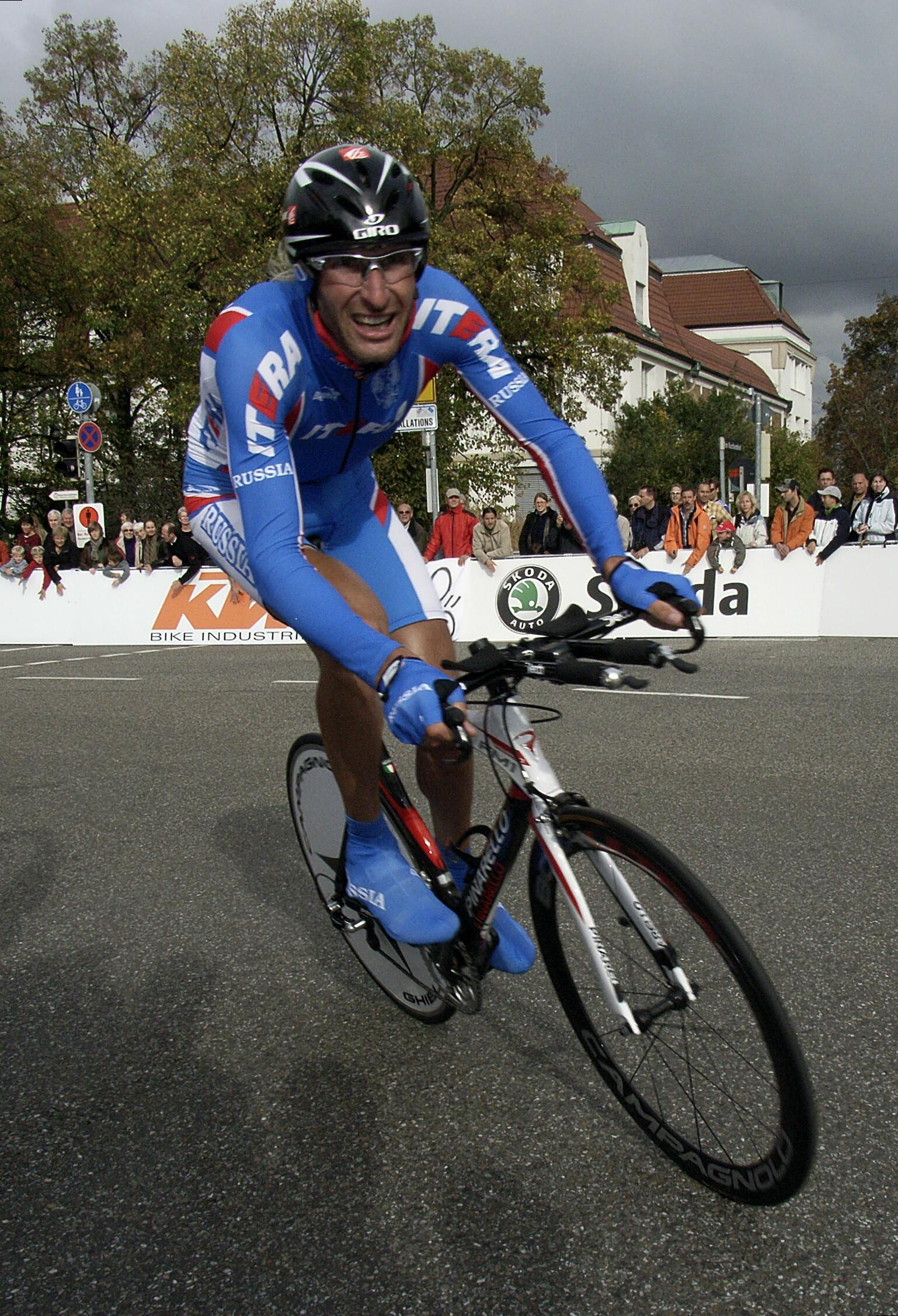
- Karpets at the 2007 UCI Road World Championships.

Personal information
- Full name: Vladimir Alexandrovich Karpets
- Born: 20 September 1980 (age 46) Leningrad, Soviet Union
- Height: 1.90 m (6 ft 3 in)
- Weight: 79 kg (174 lb; 12.4 st)

Cycling career
- Sport: Cycling
- Discipline: Road
- Role: Rider
- Rider type: All-rounder

Professional teams
- 2001–2002: Itera
- 2003–2008: iBanesto.com
- 2009–2011: Team Katusha
- 2012–2013: Movistar Team

Major wins
- Grand Tours Tour de France Young rider classification (2004) Stage races Volta a Catalunya (2007) Tour de Suisse (2007)

Vladimir Alexandrovich Karpets (Russian: Владимир Александрович Карпец) (born 20 September 1980 in Leningrad) is a Russian road bicycle racer, who last rode for UCI ProTeam Movistar Team. Karpets is most notable for winning the white jersey for best young rider in the 2004 Tour de France and his victories in the overall classifications of the Volta a Catalunya and the Tour de Suisse, both in 2007. Karpets is also a two-time Olympian.

Born in Leningrad, Karpets turned to cycling and, like fellow Russian Denis Menchov before him, moved to Spain where he joined iBanesto.com.

At the 2000 Summer Olympics in Sydney, Karpets competed on the track in the men's team pursuit where Russia got eliminated in the quarter-finals by Great Britain and took eighth. He also participated in the men's individual pursuit competition, finishing 11th. At the 2004 Summer Olympics in Athens, he competed in the men's road race, helping his fellow countryman Alexandr Kolobnev to a place of tenth.

In the 2004 Tour de France, he used his strong time trialing abilities to defeat Thomas Voeckler in the youth classification on the penultimate stage. In the 2005 season, he was not at the same level in the Tour de France, but nevertheless managed a top ten placing in the Giro d'Italia. In 2007 he won stage 1 at Vuelta a Castilla y León and took the overall victory at the Volta a Catalunya and the Tour de Suisse.

== Career achievements ==
=== Major results ===
2001
8th Overall Tour de Pologne
10th Time trial, National Road Championships
10th Overall Volta ao Alentejo
2002
2nd Overall Troféu Joaquim Agostinho
2nd Prueba Villafranca de Ordizia
3rd Time trial, National Road Championships
3rd Overall Volta ao Alentejo
4th Subida al Naranco
8th Overall Vuelta a Castilla y León
2003
6th Overall Vuelta a La Rioja
8th Overall Vuelta a Aragón
9th Grand Prix Eddy Merckx (with Evgeni Petrov
Tour de France

Held after Stages 4–6

2004
1st Overall Vuelta a La Rioja
1st Young rider classification Tour de France
2nd Overall Volta a Catalunya

1st Stage 1 (TTT)

7th Overall Vuelta a Burgos
8th Overall Vuelta a Castilla y León
9th GP Miguel Induráin
2005
7th Overall Giro d'Italia
Tour de France

Held after Stages 8 & 9

2006
2nd Overall Clásica Internacional de Alcobendas
5th Overall Vuelta a La Rioja
8th Overall Vuelta a España
8th Overall Volta a Catalunya
9th Overall Tour de Suisse
2007
1st Overall Volta a Catalunya

1st Stage 1 (TTT)

1st Overall Tour de Suisse
1st Stage 1 (ITT) Vuelta a Castilla y León
2nd Overall Vuelta a La Rioja

1st Stage 2

5th Overall Volta ao Alentejo

1st Stage 3b (ITT)

7th Overall Vuelta a España
10th Overall Vuelta a Murcia
2008
1st Prueba Villafranca de Ordizia
National Road Championships

3rd Time trial
8th Road race

2009
2nd Overall Tour de Romandie
5th Overall Tour de Suisse
2010
1st Stage 3 (TTT) Vuelta a Burgos
4th Overall Tour de Romandie
6th Time trial, National Road Championships
2011
2nd Time trial, National Road Championships

=== Grand Tour general classification results timeline ===
Grand Tour	2003	2004	2005	2006	2007	2008	2009	2010	2011	2012	2013
Giro d'Italia	—	—	7	—	—	22	—	14	—	—	153
Tour de France	100	13	50	30	14	—	13	DNF	28	53	—
/ Vuelta a España	—	—	—	8	7	—	—	13	42	—	—

Legend
—	Did not compete
DNF	Did not finish
