= Leonardo Bertagnolli =

Italian cyclist (born 1978)

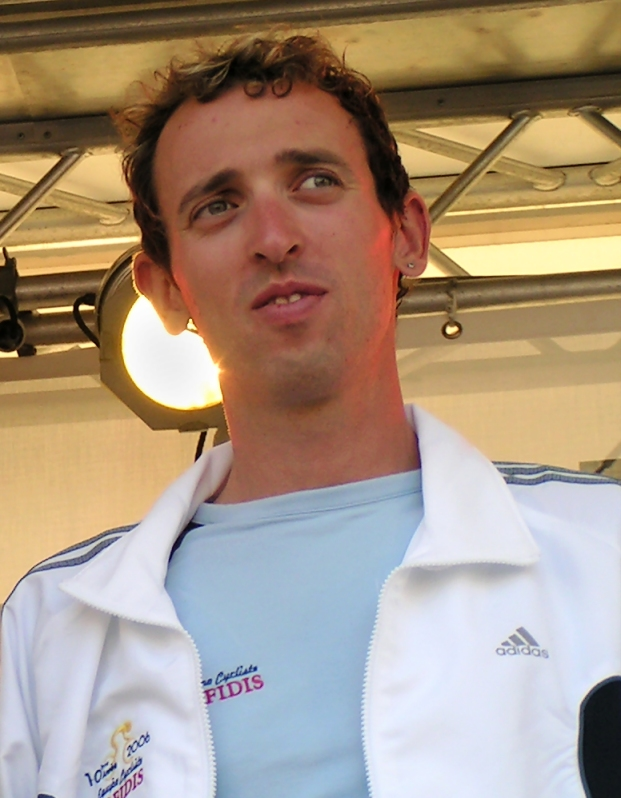

Personal information
- Full name: Leonardo Bertagnolli
- Born: 8 January 1978 (age 48) Trento, Italy
- Height: 1.74 m (5 ft 9 in)
- Weight: 63 kg (139 lb)

Cycling career
- Sport: Cycling
- Discipline: Road
- Role: Rider

Professional teams
- 2002–2004: Saeco–Longoni Sport
- 2005–2006: Cofidis
- 2007–2008: Liquigas
- 2009: Amica Chips–Knauf
- 2009–2010: Diquigiovanni–Androni
- 2011–2012: Lampre–ISD

Leonardo Bertagnolli (born 8 January 1978 in Trento) is a retired Italian professional road bicycle racer, who rode as a professional between 2002 and 2012.

== Career ==
Bertagnolli turned professional in 2002 with Saeco–Longoni Sport.

He signed for Amica Chips–Knauf, a new team in the 2009 season, though he switched teams to Diquigiovanni–Androni prior to the start of the Giro d'Italia.

Bertagnolli announced his retirement from the sport after competing in the Italian National Championships in June 2012. It later emerged that the Union Cycliste Internationale had launched disciplinary proceedings into Bertagnolli, in the light of an alleged anti-doping violation via his biological passport, and he was given a sanction of 2 years and ten months as well as disqualified from results between 1 January 2003 to 18 May 2011.

== Cancelled results ==
2004
1st Coppa Placci
1st Coppa Agostoni
1st Giro dell'Etna
2005
1st Stage 2 Vuelta a España
1st Stage 3 Tour du Limousin
2006
1st Tour du Haut Var
1st Stage 6 Tirreno–Adriatico
2007
1st Clasica de San Sebastián
1st Memorial Cimurri
4th Overall Deutschland Tour
2008
1st Intaka Tech Worlds View Challenge #2
2009
1st Stage 15 Giro d'Italia
1st Stage 2 Brixia Tour
2010
1st Stage 3 Tour of Austria
2nd Overall Trofeo Matteotti
3rd Coppa Sabatini
