= Carlos Sastre =

Spanish cyclist

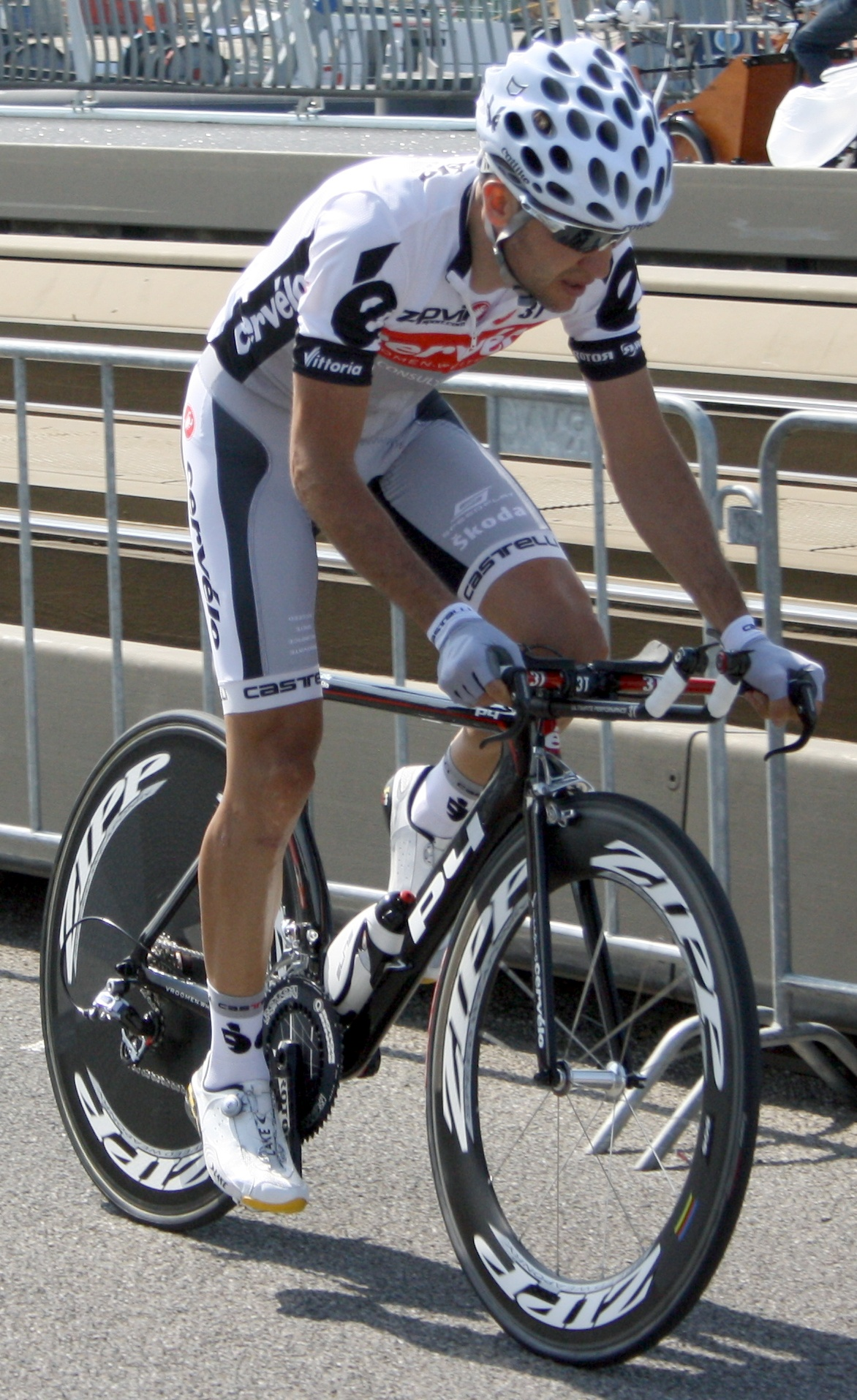
- Sastre at the 2010 Tour de France

Personal information
- Full name: Carlos Sastre Candil
- Born: 22 April 1975 (age 51) Leganés, Spain
- Height: 1.73 m (5 ft 8 in)
- Weight: 61 kg (134 lb; 9 st 8 lb)

Cycling career
- Sport: Cycling
- Current team: Retired
- Discipline: Road
- Role: Rider
- Rider type: All-rounder

Professional teams
- 1998–2001: ONCE
- 2002–2008: CSC–Tiscali
- 2009–2010: Cervélo TestTeam
- 2011: Geox–TMC

Major wins
- Grand Tours Tour de France General classification (2008) Mountains classification (2008) 3 individual stages (2003, 2006, 2008) Giro d'Italia 2 individual stages (2009) 1 TTT stage (2006) Vuelta a España Mountains classification (2000) 1 TTT stage (2006)

Carlos Sastre Candil (pronounced [ˈkaɾ.los ˈsas.tɾe ˈkandil]; born 22 April 1975) is a former Spanish professional road bicycle racer and winner of the 2008 Tour de France. He consistently achieved outstanding results in the Vuelta a España and in the Tour de France. Sastre established himself as a strong and stable climbing specialist, and after working to improve his individual time trial skills, he became a contender for the top GC spots in the Grand Tours. In total, Sastre finished in the top ten of fifteen Grand Tours during his career, and finished on the podium of each of them. Sastre never tested positive for drugs, nor was he implicated in any doping investigation, even though he performed at the top level of cycling.

Sastre continues to be widely regarded, following the Lance Armstrong affair, as one of the very few 'clean' riders to have won the Tour de France in the period from 1996 to 2013, as he has never been involved in a doping affair. In fact, with respect to doping allegations and admissions that have surrounded Tour winners in recent decades, Sastre has been called "Don Limpio" ("Mr. Clean" in Spanish) by the press and others.

== Biography ==
When Sastre was young, professional cyclist Francisco Ignacio San Román lived in his parents' house during military service. Sastre was at first coached by his father, until he became an amateur.

Sastre signed his first professional contract in 1997 with ONCE. In his five years at ONCE he mostly served as a domestique and only managed a few wins, though he showed his strength in the mountains with several good results, most notably winning the mountain competition in the 2000 Vuelta a España.

In 2002 he switched to Team CSC, where he filled the role of captain in the Vuelta a España and, until 2005, had a free role in the Tour de France. This resulted in his winning the 13th stage of the 2003 Tour de France, which Sastre won with a pacifier in his mouth, as a greeting to his infant daughter. Sastre finished 2 minutes 32 seconds ahead of team captain Tyler Hamilton on the stage.

Before the 2004 season, Carlos Sastre and teammate Ivan Basso trained extensively to improve their individual time trial skills, making them better all-round riders. They went to Boston to train on MIT's wind tunnel. This helped Sastre improve his Vuelta a España performance, ranking 6th in the overall classification, as well as 8th in the 2004 Tour de France.

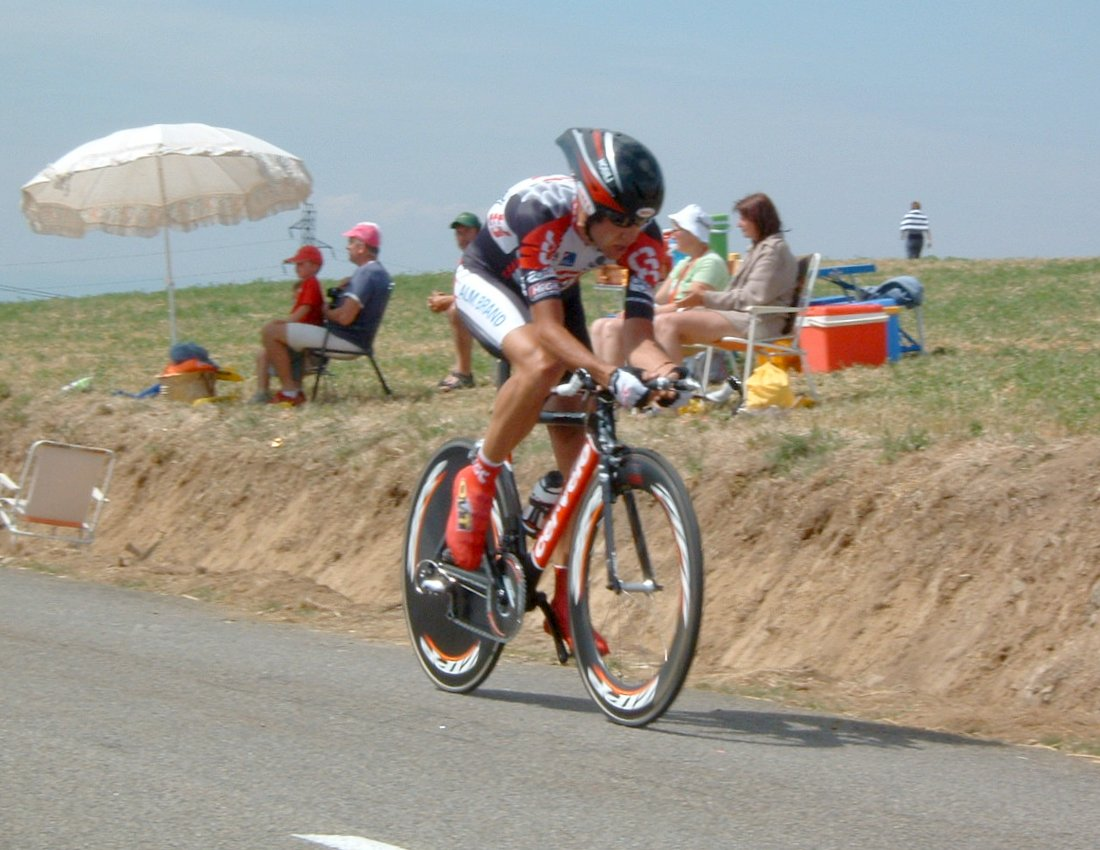
Tour 2005: Sastre during the stage 20 individual time trial.

In the 2005 Tour de France he was a domestique for Ivan Basso, and 21st in the overall classification. However, as the captain of Team CSC's 2005 Vuelta a España campaign, Sastre finally reached the podium of a Grand Tour, finishing in third place behind Denis Menchov and initial winner Roberto Heras. Heras was later disqualified due to a positive EPO test, making Sastre the de facto second placed rider of the competition. After the Vuelta a España, he extended his contract with Team CSC for another year. In May 2006 he signed a new contract which expired after the 2008 season.

=== 2006 ===
Before the 2006 Giro d'Italia in May, Sastre decided to ride the Giro d'Italia to help Ivan Basso to win, indicating that he would ride all three Grand Tours; the Giro and Tour in support of Basso and the Vuelta as team captain. In the Giro, Sastre's pace on select mountain stages helped Basso win the overall classification. Sastre finished 43rd in the GC of the 2006 Giro.

Days before the 2006 Tour de France started in July, Team CSC suspended Ivan Basso as his name was brought up in the Operación Puerto doping case. This meant Sastre became the CSC team captain at the 2006 Tour. Even though his main focus for the season had been the 2006 Vuelta a España in September, this Tour was a great opportunity for Sastre to prove himself as a Tour GC contender. Through the mountain stages, Sastre proved himself the strongest mountain rider in the peloton, beating Floyd Landis by one minute and 59 seconds and Andreas Klöden by two and a half minutes on mountain climbs. Sastre was placed well on stage 15, and came in 2nd on both stage 16 and 17, where he closed the gap to the then yellow jersey Óscar Pereiro. Before the penultimate stage of the Tour, the stage 19 individual time trial, Sastre was the second placed rider overall, trailing race leader Óscar Pereiro by 14 seconds. However, on the final time trial, which stretched 57 kilometres between Le Creusot and Montceau-les-Mines, Sastre finished 20th, losing several minutes to Pereiro, eventual overall winner Floyd Landis and Andreas Klöden, who took third place overall. Sastre thus finished the 2006 Tour in 4th place. Floyd Landis has since been stripped of this title, making Sastre 3rd in the 2006 Tour de France.

When he finished the 2006 Vuelta 4th overall, Sastre, who also rode the Giro d'Italia and Tour de France in 2006, became one of few riders to finish all three Grand Tours in one year.

=== 2007 ===
In the 2007 Tour de France, Sastre finished 4th overall, 7'08" behind race winner Alberto Contador. He finished 2nd overall in the 2007 Vuelta a España, 3'31" behind race winner Denis Menchov.

=== 2008 Tour de France ===
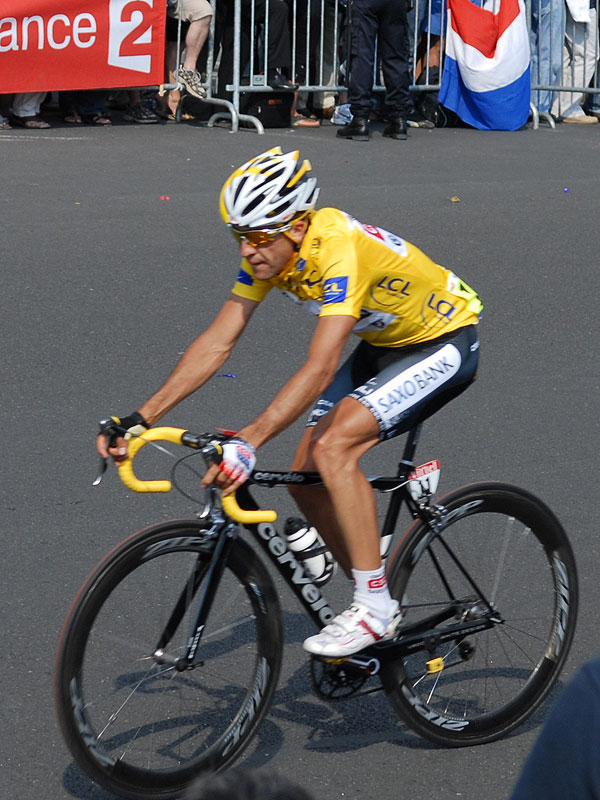
Carlos Sastre entering Paris wearing the yellow jersey.

Coming into the 2008 Tour de France, Sastre was considered one of the favorites to win the race along with Australian Cadel Evans of Team Silence–Lotto, Spaniard Alejandro Valverde of Caisse d'Epargne and Russian Denis Menchov of Rabobank. He also faced competition within his own team from brothers Andy and Fränk Schleck, despite officially being the leader of CSC–Saxo Bank.

Sastre had a quiet, understated opening to the tour. After a lacklustre opening time-trial, he remained relatively restrained in the opening mountain stages in the Pyrenees and opted to stay defensive and follow the wheel of his main rivals. This allowed his CSC teammate Fränk Schleck to claim the yellow jersey at the finish to stage 15 at Prato Nevoso. However, on the crucial 17th stage, Sastre showed his class and mountain climbing prowess, attacking at the bottom of the final climb of the day, Alpe d'Huez, finishing 2 minutes and 15 seconds ahead of Evans, claiming both the stage win and the yellow jersey. Sastre, knowing that a slender lead over a strong time-trialist like Evans may not have been enough to secure overall victory going into the penultimate stage, sought to gain an advantage of at least a couple of minutes over his closest rivals.

Following his victorious Stage 17 attack, Sastre took a lead of 1 minute and 24 seconds over teammate Fränk Schleck into the final time trial, although, more crucially, he had a further 10 seconds advantage over Evans, a man considered to be a more accomplished time trialist, who was widely expected to overcome the deficit and leapfrog Sastre into first place. However, Sastre managed to hold onto his lead in the time trial, finishing the Tour with a 58-second lead. Following his overall victory in the general classification, Sastre found it hard to express his joy at finally achieving a boyhood dream;

It's very moving, I've dreamt of this since I was a child. I'm beyond words, to be here with my family is really special.

Sastre's victory made a deserved 2008 tour for CSC–Saxo Bank, as they also won the young rider classification with Andy Schleck, the overall team classification, as well as 2 stages, the latter being won by Sastre, on l'Alpe d'Huez.

His victory was however criticized by Lance Armstrong, who said the 2008 Tour was a joke. Armstrong later apologized for this to Sastre.

Sastre and CSC could not agree on a new contract, so Sastre left the team at the end of the year.

After the Tour, Sastre ended up focusing on the Vuelta a España looking to double his victories. He later finished 3rd overall.

=== 2009 ===
Sastre joined the new Cervélo TestTeam for the 2009 season. He won the high mountain Stage 16 of the 2009 Giro d'Italia, which had been called the Giro's queen stage, after seven hours and twelve minutes. His decisive attack saw him break free from a group of general classification contenders to get to the summit of Monte Petrano just under half a minute faster than the group he left. After seeming off his form in Stage 17 of that race, Sastre rebounded with another solo ride to victory in Stage 19 to Mount Vesuvius. He then completed the Giro with a solid ride in the final time-trial around Rome to hold off Ivan Basso and finished 2nd overall.

In the 2009 Tour de France, Sastre attempted to defend his title but had a quiet year finishing 16th overall.

=== 2010 ===
In 2010, Sastre raced all three Grand Tours, finishing 8th in the Giro, 20th in the Tour and 7th in the Vuelta.

He announced that he would join Geox-TMC for the 2011 season.

=== 2011 ===
In the 2011 Vuelta a España Sastre himself finished 20th overall, but helped his teammate Juan José Cobo, who was later, in 2019, considered ineligible for results due to the use of performance-enhancing drugs in the period between 2009 and 2011, claim the overall title ahead of Chris Froome. Chris Froome was later recognised as the 2011 champion. Bradley Wiggins was promoted to second place, and Bauke Mollema promoted to third.

Shortly afterwards, he announced his retirement, bringing an end to a professional career spanning 15 years.

== Personal life ==
Sastre is married to the sister of cyclist José María Jiménez, who died in 2003. Sastre dedicated his 2008 Tour victory to his memory.

== Career achievements ==
=== Major results ===
1997
3rd Overall Vuelta a Navarra
10th Overall Grand Prix Guillaume Tell
1999
4th GP Villafranca de Ordizia
8th Overall Vuelta a Castilla y León
10th Subida a Urkiola
2000
2nd Subida al Naranco
4th Overall Escalada a Montjuïc
4th Clásica a los Puertos de Guadarrama
4th Memorial Manuel Galera
8th Overall Vuelta a España

1st Mountains classification

10th Overall Vuelta a Castilla y León
2001
9th Overall Tirreno–Adriatico
9th Overall Vuelta a Burgos

1st Stage 3

2002
5th Overall Tour de Romandie
5th Züri-Metzgete
10th Overall Tour de France
2003
6th Overall Tour de Romandie
9th Overall Tour de France

1st Stage 13

2004
4th Classique des Alpes
6th Overall Vuelta a España
8th Overall Tour de France
2005
2nd Overall Escalada a Montjuïc

1st Stage 1a

3rd Overall Vuelta a España
6th Giro dell'Emilia
2006
1st Klasika Primavera
1st Stage 5 (TTT) Giro d'Italia
3rd Overall Tour de France

1st Stage 17

4th Overall Vuelta a España

1st Stage 1 (TTT)
Held & after Stage 1

5th Overall Escalada a Montjuïc
7th LuK Challenge (with Christian Müller
2007
2nd Overall Vuelta a España
3rd Overall Escalada a Montjuïc
4th Overall Tour de France
7th Clásica de San Sebastián
2008
1st Overall Tour de France

1st Mountains classification
1st Stage 17

3rd Overall Vuelta a España
9th Overall Vuelta a Murcia
2009
2nd Overall Giro d'Italia

1st Stages 16 & 19

2010
3rd Clásica de San Sebastián
7th Overall Vuelta a España
8th Overall Giro d'Italia
2011
3rd Overall Tour of Austria
6th Overall Tour of Slovenia

=== Grand Tour general classification results timeline ===
| Grand Tour | 1999 | 2000 | 2001 | 2002 | 2003 | 2004 | 2005 | 2006 | 2007 | 2008 | 2009 | 2010 | 2011 |
|---|---|---|---|---|---|---|---|---|---|---|---|---|---|
| Giro d'Italia | 101 | — | — | 38 | — | — | — | 43 | — | — | 2 | 8 | 30 |
| Tour de France | — | — | 20 | 10 | 9 | 8 | 21 | 3 | 4 | 1 | 15 | 18 | — |
| / Vuelta a España | — | 8 | DNF | — | 35 | 6 | 3 | 4 | 2 | 3 | — | 7 | 20 |

Legend
| — | Did not compete |
| DNF | Did not finish |
