= Aurélien Clerc =

Swiss cyclist (born 1979)

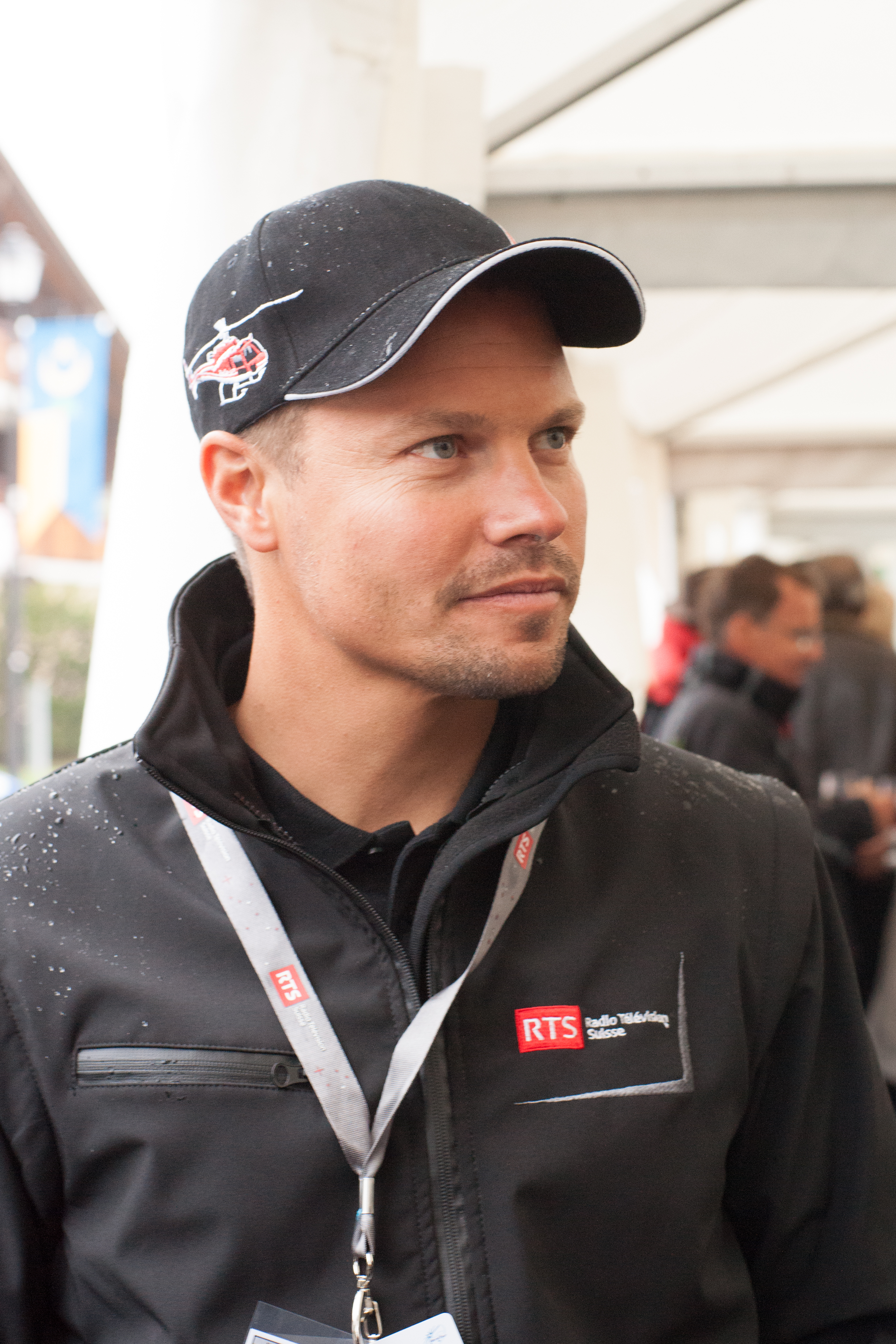
- Clerc at the 2013 Tour de Romandie

Personal information
- Full name: Aurélien Clerc
- Born: 26 August 1979 (age 47) Vevey, Switzerland
- Height: 1.76 m (5 ft 9 in)
- Weight: 71 kg (157 lb)

Cycling career
- Sport: Cycling
- Current team: Retired
- Discipline: Road
- Role: Rider
- Rider type: Sprinter

Professional teams
- 2001: Post Swiss
- 2002: Mapei–Quick-Step
- 2003–2004: Quick-Step–Davitamon
- 2005–2006: Phonak
- 2007–2008: Bouygues Télécom
- 2009: Ag2r–La Mondiale

Major wins
- Nokere Koerse (2002)

Aurélien Clerc (born 26 August 1979) is a Swiss former professional road bicycle racer who last rode for UCI ProTour team Ag2r–La Mondiale. He retired from pro cycling after 2009, unable to find a new team, and started a new career as an insurance adviser. His sporting career began with Velo Club Cycliphile Bex.

== Palmares ==
2000
1st Road race, National Under−23 Road Championships
1st Stage 5 Rheinland-Pfalz Rundfahrt
1st Stage 3 Vuelta a Navarra
2001
2nd Rominger Classic
6th Nokere Koerse
10th Rund um Düren
2002
Vuelta a Cuba

1st Stages 3, 4, 11 & 13

Tour de Picardie

1st Stages 2 & 3

1st Stage 1 Tour of Slovenia
1st Stage 1 Okolo Slovenska
1st Nokere Koerse
4th Giro del Lago Maggiore
6th Sparkassen Giro
2003
1st Stage 1 Tour de Picardie
5th GP de la Ville de Rennes
7th Overall Tour of Qatar
7th Nokere Koerse
9th Grote Prijs Jef Scherens
2004
1st Stage 4 Vuelta a Burgos
2005
6th Paris–Tours
6th Paris–Bourges
2006
1st Stage 2 Clásica Internacional de Alcobendas
3rd Overall Tour of Qatar
10th Paris–Bourges
2007
2nd Châteauroux Classic
2nd Paris–Bourges
4th Overall Circuit Franco-Belge

1st Stage 1

9th Paris–Tours
2008
1st Stage 1 Driedaagse van West-Vlaanderen
2nd Gent–Wevelgem
4th GP de la Ville de Rennes
