= Denis Menchov =

Russian cyclist

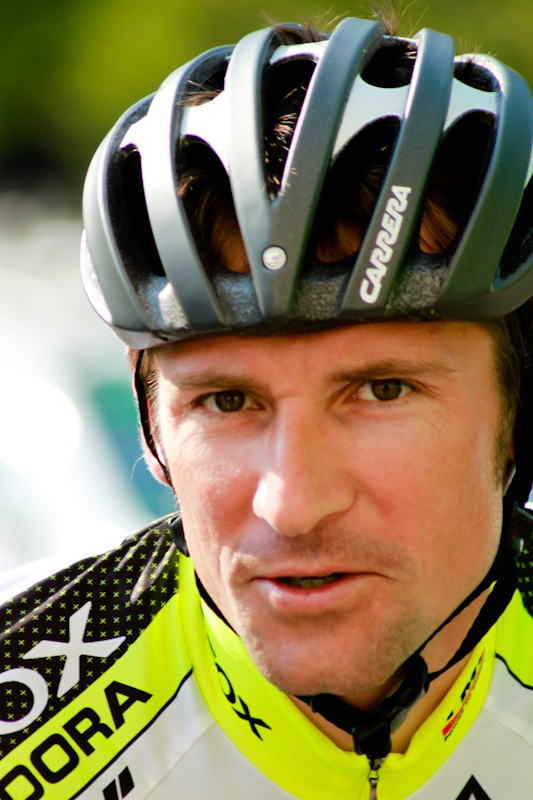
- Menchov at the 2011 Tour de Romandie

Personal information
- Full name: Denis Nikolayevich Menchov
- Nicknames: The Silent Assassin; The Pope; Denny
- Born: 25 January 1978 (age 48) Oryol, Soviet Union
- Height: 1.80 m (5 ft 11 in)
- Weight: 65 kg (143 lb; 10 st 3 lb)

Cycling career
- Sport: Cycling
- Discipline: Road
- Role: Rider
- Rider type: All-rounder

Professional teams
- 2000–2004: Banesto
- 2005–2010: Rabobank
- 2011: Geox–TMC
- 2012–2013: Team Katusha

Major wins
- Grand Tours Tour de France Young rider classification (2003) 1 individual stage (2006) Giro d'Italia General classification (2009) Points classification (2009) 2 individual stages (2009) Vuelta a España General classification (2007) Mountains classification (2007) Combination classification (2005, 2007) 5 individual stages (2004, 2005, 2007, 2012) Stage races Tour of the Basque Country (2004) One-day races and Classics National Time Trial Championships (2012)

Denis Nikolayevich Menshov (often mistakenly romanized as Menchov, Денис Николаевич Меньшов; born 25 January 1978) is a former professional Russian road bicycle racer, who rode as a professional between 2000 and 2013. He was best known as a general classification rider, a climber and an accomplished time trialist. In 2005 he finished second in the Vuelta a España and in 2007 he finished as the champion. He also won the centenary Giro d'Italia in 2009 and finished second in the Tour de France in 2010 becoming the first Russian to do so. He was later disqualified from that Tour de France, as well as the 2009 and 2012 editions, owing to adverse biological passport findings.

== Professional career ==
=== Banesto (2000–2004) ===
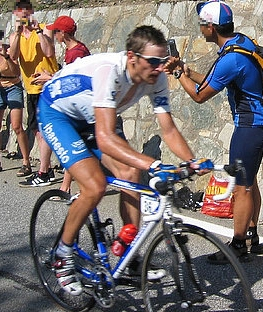
Menchov at the 2003 Tour de France

Born in Oryol, Menchov started his professional career in 2000 with the Banesto team of José Miguel Echavarri. His first success came in 2001, when he won the Tour de l'Avenir, a stage race for young professionals. A year later he won a stage in the Dauphiné Liberé. In 2003, Menchov had his breakthrough when he finished 11th in the Tour de France, and won the young rider classification. 2004 was his last year at Banesto and his most successful. He won Tour of the Basque Country, a stage in Vuelta a Aragón, a stage in Paris–Nice and stage five in the 2004 Vuelta a España, from Zaragoza to Morella.

=== Rabobank (2005–2010) ===
Menchov's contract ran out in September 2004 and he moved to the Dutch Rabobank team for two years. He became team captain following Levi Leipheimer's departure to Gerolsteiner. Menchov was Rabobank's main contender for the 2005 Tour de France, but due to a cold, he finished 85th, 2h 35m behind Lance Armstrong. His 2005 Vuelta was more successful. He won the opening time trial to Granada and the stage nine time trial to Lloret de Mar, and wore the leader's jersey. On the fifteen stage, he lost sight of Roberto Heras on a climb and ended the race second behind Heras. Heras was later disqualified for doping, and Menchov received the official win of the 2005 Vuelta, but the title was given back to Heras in 2012. He also captured the event's Combined Classification.

In the 2006 Tour de France Menchov won the 11th stage – the second mountain stage – from Tarbes to Aran Valley–Pla-de-Beret after a sprint with Leipheimer and Floyd Landis. The final week took its toll and he dropped from 3rd to 6th in the Alps. He later moved up to 5th overall after the disqualification of race winner Floyd Landis.

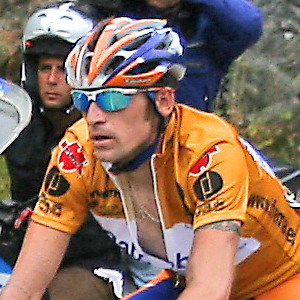
Menchov wearing the leader's jersey at the 2007 Vuelta a España

Menchov abandoned the 2007 Tour de France on stage 17, the day after his teammate Michael Rasmussen was fired from Rabobank. Later that year, he won the Vuelta a España after leading during the second half of the race. In the Vuelta he also won a stage, the mountains classification and the combination classification.

In 2008 Menchov concentrated on Tour de France and did not defend his Vuelta title. He ended third in the Tour because Bernhard Kohl was disqualified for doping. Also Menchov finished fifth in Giro prior.

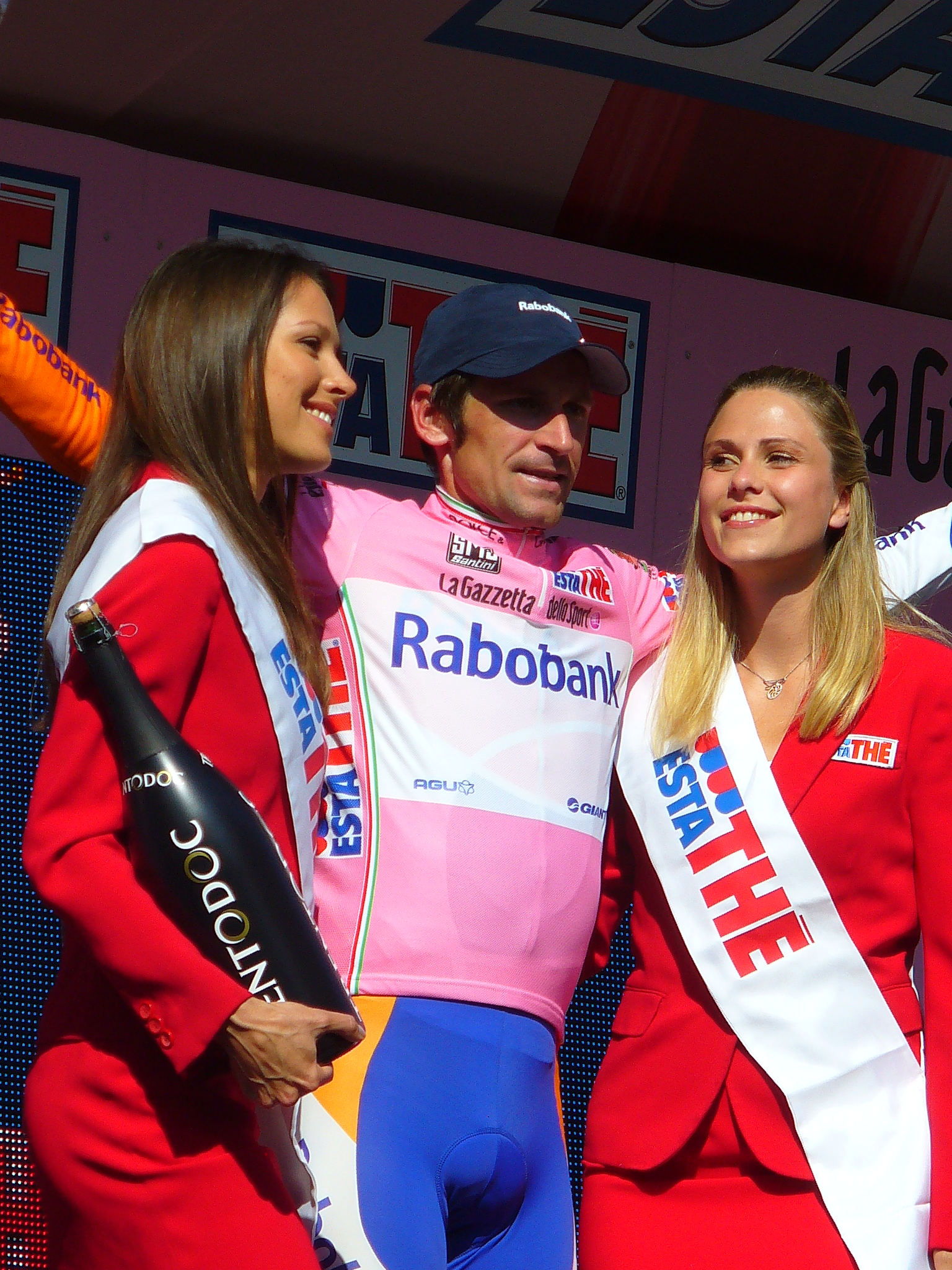
Menchov wearing the Maglia Rosa at the 2009 Giro d'Italia

In 2009 Menchov won the Giro d'Italia, with wins in stages 5 and 12. Despite crashing in the final kilometer of the last-stage time-trial through Rome, Menchov held the pink jersey and extended his lead by 21 seconds, winning by 41 seconds over Italy's Danilo Di Luca. Menchov also won the points jersey that year.

In the 2010 Tour de France, Menchov came in second place after passing Samuel Sánchez in the final Time Trial. He was third originally, but moved to the second spot as a consequence of Contador's victory being revoked due to a doping affair, as was decided on 6 February 2012. He was later retroactively disqualified and stripped of his second place finish, following a two-year doping ban initiated in 2014 after his retirement. Menchov was also disqualified from the 2009 and 2012 Tours.

=== Geox-TMC (2011) ===
Later in 2010 Menchov transferred to Geox-TMC, as joint leader of the team with Carlos Sastre. Menchov was replaced as leader of Rabobank by Robert Gesink. With Geox, Menchov finished 8th in the 2011 Giro. The team were not invited to the Tour de France, a blow to Menchov, who had been considered a favourite. Menchov finished fifth overall at the Vuelta a España, having helped teammate Juan José Cobo to overall victory.

=== Katusha (2012–2013) ===
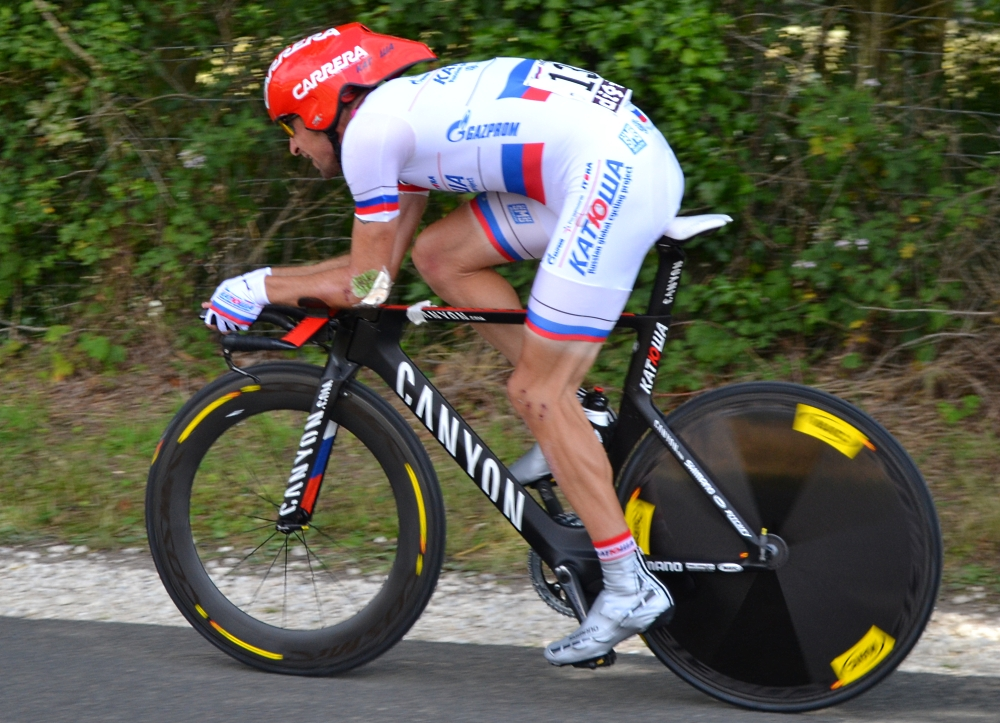
Menchov at the 2012 Tour de France

At the end of 2011, Menchov moved to Russian team Katusha for the 2012 season. Menchov focused the 2012 season on the 2012 Tour de France, although he was devastated with crashes. Menchov also won the Russian national time trial crown. He started the Tour very well with eighth place in prologue, but due to health problems finished only 15th place overall at the end. He was later retroactively disqualified from the 2012 Tour following a post-retirement doping ban. He rode in the 2012 Summer Olympics representing the Russian National Team both in Olympic road race and individual time trial After, the Olympic Games, Menchov rode the Vuelta a España where he won the penultimate stage in Bola del Mundo after outsprinting Richie Porte. After suffering a knee injury before the Giro d'Italia, Menchov announced his retirement from the sport of cycling in 2013. (Note: During the 2012 and 2013 seasons, Denis Menchov was on Russian team Katusha, but, on 12 July 2014, was banned from cycling events until 9 April 2015 due to adverse biological passport findings. However, he announced his retirement from cycling on 21 May 2013.)

=== Return to the sport: Gazprom–RusVelo (2019) ===
Menchov returned to cycling in 2019, in the role of directeur sportif for UCI Pro-Continental team Gazprom–RusVelo.

== Doping ==
On 10 July 2014, a UCI press release detailing various athlete sanctions specified that Menchov had been banned (for a period of two years) until 9 April 2015 due to adverse biological passport findings. Due to this, he has been disqualified from the 2009, 2010 and 2012 Tours de France.

On 22 January 2015, USADA released its reasoned decision on the case of Dr. Geert Leinders in which it stated that Menchov received blood transfusions during the 2005 Tour de France.

== Career achievements ==
=== Major results ===
1995
1st Overall Course de la Paix Juniors
1997
1st Overall Paths of King Nikola

1st Stages 3a & 3b

1st Overall Volta a Lleida
1st Stage 2 Okolo Slovenska
3rd Overall International Tour of Rhodes
1998
1st Overall Ronde de l'Isard
7th Overall Ruban Granitier Breton
1999
9th Overall Vuelta a Navarra
2000
3rd Time trial, National Road Championships
2001
1st Overall Tour de l'Avenir
7th Overall Critérium du Dauphiné Libéré
7th Overall Route du Sud
2002
2nd Overall Vuelta a La Rioja
6th Overall Critérium du Dauphiné Libéré

1st Stage 2

2003
1st Clásica a los Puertos de Guadarrama
1st Young rider classification, Tour de France
2nd Overall Vuelta a Castilla y León
6th Clásica Internacional de Alcobendas
8th Overall Vuelta a La Rioja
2004
1st Overall Tour of the Basque Country

1st Stage 4

1st Stage 5 Vuelta a España
1st Stage 6 Paris–Nice
2nd Overall Vuelta a Burgos
2nd Overall Vuelta a Aragón

1st Stage 1

7th Overall Volta a la Comunitat Valenciana
2005
2nd Overall Vuelta a España

1st Combination classification
1st Stages 1 (ITT) & 9 (ITT)
Held after Stages 1 & 9–14
Held after Stages 1 11–14

3rd Overall Tour de Romandie
8th Overall Critérium International
2006
5th Overall Tour de France

1st Stage 11

6th Overall Critérium du Dauphiné Libéré

1st Stage 4

9th Overall Volta a Catalunya
2007
1st Overall Vuelta a España

1st Mountains classification
1st Combination classification
1st Stage 10
Held after Stage 20

3rd Overall Volta a Catalunya

1st Points classification
1st Stage 5 (ITT)

4th Overall Critérium du Dauphiné Libéré
8th Overall Vuelta a Murcia
2008
3rd Overall Tour de France
4th Overall Tour de Romandie
5th Overall Giro d'Italia
5th Overall Vuelta a Castilla y León
6th Clásica de San Sebastián
2009
1st Overall Giro d'Italia

1st Points classification
1st Stages 5 & 12 (ITT)

1st Overall Vuelta a Murcia
5th Overall Vuelta a Castilla y León
2010
2nd Overall Tour de Romandie
2nd Overall Vuelta a Murcia
~~3rd Overall Tour de France~~
9th Overall Vuelta a Castilla y León
2011
2nd Overall Vuelta a Murcia

1st Stage 2

5th Overall Vuelta a España
5th Overall Tour of Austria
7th Overall Giro d'Italia
2012
1st Time trial, National Road Championships
1st Stage 20 Vuelta a España
4th Overall Vuelta a Andalucía
2013
4th Overall Volta ao Algarve
8th Gran Premio Città di Camaiore

==== General classification results timeline ====
Grand Tour general classification results
Grand Tour	2000	2001	2002	2003	2004	2005	2006	2007	2008	2009	2010	2011	2012	2013
Giro d'Italia	—	—	—	—	—	—	—	—	5	1	—	7	—	—
Tour de France	—	47	93	11	DNF	85	5	DNF	3	~~51~~	~~3~~	—	~~15~~	—
/ Vuelta a España	—	—	—	—	DNF	2	DNF	1	—	—	41	5	54	—
Major stage race general classification results
Race	2000	2001	2002	2003	2004	2005	2006	2007	2008	2009	2010	2011	2012	2013
/ Paris–Nice	—	53	DNF	—	12	—	—	—	—	—	—	—	DNF	14
/ Tirreno–Adriatico	Did not contest during his career													
Volta a Catalunya	—	—	—	—	—	—	9	3	—	—	DNF	109	11	DNF
Tour of the Basque Country	—	—	—	36	1	11	DNF	—	—	—	—	—	—	—
/ Tour de Romandie	—	—	—	—	—	3	—	54	4	11	2	14	DNF	—
Critérium du Dauphiné	DNF	7	6	39	—	24	6	4	—	—	25	—	42	—
Tour de Suisse	Did not contest during his career													

Legend
—	Did not compete
DNF	Did not finish

DSQ = Disqualified
