= 2013 Tour de Romandie =

2013 UCI World Tour, race 14 of 28

Race details
- Dates: 23–28 April 2013
- Stages: 5 + Prologue
- Distance: 758.65 km (471.40 mi)
- Winning time: 19h 24' 51"

Results
Jersey awarded to the overall winner	Winner	Chris Froome (Great Britain)	(Team Sky)
	Second	Simon Špilak (Slovenia)	(Team Katusha)
	Third	Rui Costa (Portugal)	(Movistar Team)
Jersey awarded to the mountains classification winner	Mountains	Marcus Burghardt (Germany)	(BMC Racing Team)
Jersey awarded to the youth classification winner	Youth	Wilco Kelderman (Netherlands)	(Blanco Pro Cycling)
	Team	Team Sky	

The 2013 Tour de Romandie was the 67th running of the Tour de Romandie cycling stage race. The race consisted of six stages, beginning with a prologue stage in Le Châble on 23 April and concluded with another individual time trial, in Geneva, on 28 April. It was the fourteenth race of the 2013 UCI World Tour season.

The race was won by Great Britain's Chris Froome of Team Sky, who led the race from start to finish – the first time that a Team Sky rider had led from start-to-finish – after winning the opening prologue in Le Châble, extending his advantage towards the end of the race. Ultimately, Froome won the general classification by 54 seconds over runner-up Simon Špilak (Team Katusha), who was the winner of the race's queen stage – the fourth stage – to Les Diablerets, ahead of Froome. The podium was completed by Rui Costa of the Movistar Team, who finished third for the second year in a row. Costa finished 55 seconds behind Špilak, and one minute 49 seconds behind Froome.

In the race's other classifications, Blanco Pro Cycling's Wilco Kelderman was the winner of the white jersey for the young rider classification as he was the highest placed rider born in 1988 or later, finishing in fifth place overall after taking the jersey from FDJ's Thibaut Pinot during the final time trial. Matthias Brändle of IAM Cycling won the green jersey for the most points gained in intermediate sprints, while the pink jersey for the King of the Mountains classification went to Marcus Burghardt of the BMC Racing Team. The team classification was won by Team Sky for the second year in a row.

== Teams ==
As the Tour de Romandie was a UCI World Tour event, all UCI ProTeams were invited automatically and obligated to send a squad. Originally, eighteen ProTeams were scheduled to be invited to the race, with two other squads – Team Europcar and IAM Cycling – given wildcard places, and as such, would have formed the event's 20-team peloton. Team Katusha subsequently regained their ProTour status after an appeal to the Court of Arbitration for Sport. With Team Katusha not originally invited to the race, race organisers announced their inclusion to the race, bringing the total number of teams competing to twenty-one.

The 21 teams that competed in the race were:

- Ag2r–La Mondiale
- Argos–Shimano
- Astana
- Blanco Pro Cycling
- BMC Racing Team
- Cannondale
- Team Europcar
- Euskaltel–Euskadi
- FDJ
- Garmin–Sharp
- IAM Cycling
- Team Katusha
- Lampre–Merida
- Lotto–Belisol
- Movistar Team
- Omega Pharma–Quick-Step
- Orica–GreenEDGE
- RadioShack–Leopard
- Saxo–Tinkoff
- Team Sky
- Vacansoleil–DCM

Among the 168-rider start list – each team entered eight riders for the race – were two previous winners of the race. 2009 winner Roman Kreuziger was the designated leader for Saxo–Tinkoff, while Team Katusha's Simon Špilak, who was the winner of the 2010 event – after the on-road winner Alejandro Valverde had his results expunged – was their respective leader. Valverde was also in attendance at the race, leading the Movistar Team alongside Rui Costa, who finished third in 2012.

== Stages ==
=== Prologue ===
23 April 2013 — Le Châble to Bruson, 7.45 kilometres (4.63 mi), individual time trial (ITT)

Prologue results
Rank	Rider	Team	Time
1	Chris Froome (GBR)	Team Sky	13' 15"
2	Andrew Talansky (USA)	Garmin–Sharp	+ 6"
3	Robert Kišerlovski (CRO)	RadioShack–Leopard	+ 13"
4	Richie Porte (AUS)	Team Sky	+ 15"
5	Rui Costa (POR)	Movistar Team	+ 16"
6	Thibaut Pinot (FRA)	FDJ	+ 17"
7	Stef Clement (NED)	Blanco Pro Cycling	+ 17"
8	Alejandro Valverde (SPA)	Movistar Team	+ 17"
9	Tom Danielson (USA)	Garmin–Sharp	+ 17"
10	Wilco Kelderman (NED)	Blanco Pro Cycling	+ 18"

General classification after Prologue
Rank	Rider	Team	Time
1	Chris Froome (GBR)	Team Sky	13' 15"
2	Andrew Talansky (USA)	Garmin–Sharp	+ 6"
3	Robert Kišerlovski (CRO)	RadioShack–Leopard	+ 13"
4	Richie Porte (AUS)	Team Sky	+ 15"
5	Rui Costa (POR)	Movistar Team	+ 16"
6	Thibaut Pinot (FRA)	FDJ	+ 17"
7	Stef Clement (NED)	Blanco Pro Cycling	+ 17"
8	Alejandro Valverde (SPA)	Movistar Team	+ 17"
9	Tom Danielson (USA)	Garmin–Sharp	+ 17"
10	Wilco Kelderman (NED)	Blanco Pro Cycling	+ 18"

=== Stage 1 ===
24 April 2013 — Saint-Maurice to Renens–Ouest lausannois, 176.4 kilometres (109.6 mi)

Stage 1 results
Rank	Rider	Team	Time
1	Gianni Meersman (BEL)	Omega Pharma–Quick-Step	4h 29' 09"
2	Giacomo Nizzolo (ITA)	RadioShack–Leopard	+ 0"
3	Roberto Ferrari (ITA)	Lampre–Merida	+ 0"
4	Luka Mezgec (SLO)	Argos–Shimano	+ 0"
5	Kévin Reza (FRA)	Team Europcar	+ 0"
6	Francesco Gavazzi (ITA)	Astana	+ 0"
7	Matthew Goss (AUS)	Orica–GreenEDGE	+ 0"
8	Rui Costa (POR)	Movistar Team	+ 0"
9	Gaëtan Bille (BEL)	Lotto–Belisol	+ 0"
10	Marco Marcato (ITA)	Vacansoleil–DCM	+ 0"

General classification after stage 1
Rank	Rider	Team	Time
1	Chris Froome (GBR)	Team Sky	4h 42' 24"
2	Andrew Talansky (USA)	Garmin–Sharp	+ 6"
3	Robert Kišerlovski (CRO)	RadioShack–Leopard	+ 13"
4	Richie Porte (AUS)	Team Sky	+ 15"
5	Rui Costa (POR)	Movistar Team	+ 16"
6	Thibaut Pinot (FRA)	FDJ	+ 17"
7	Stef Clement (NED)	Blanco Pro Cycling	+ 17"
8	Alejandro Valverde (SPA)	Movistar Team	+ 17"
9	Tom Danielson (USA)	Garmin–Sharp	+ 17"
10	Wilco Kelderman (NED)	Blanco Pro Cycling	+ 18"

=== Stage 2 ===
25 April 2013 — Prilly–Ouest lausannois to Granges–Solothurn, 190.3 kilometres (118.2 mi)

Stage 2 results
Rank	Rider	Team	Time
1	Ramūnas Navardauskas (LTU)	Garmin–Sharp	4h 51' 49"
2	Enrico Gasparotto (ITA)	Astana	+ 0"
3	Gianni Meersman (BEL)	Omega Pharma–Quick-Step	+ 0"
4	Luka Mezgec (SLO)	Argos–Shimano	+ 0"
5	Dominik Nerz (GER)	BMC Racing Team	+ 0"
6	Francesco Gavazzi (ITA)	Astana	+ 0"
7	Jan Bakelants (BEL)	RadioShack–Leopard	+ 0"
8	Stef Clement (NED)	Blanco Pro Cycling	+ 0"
9	Michael Albasini (SWI)	Orica–GreenEDGE	+ 0"
10	Manuele Mori (ITA)	Lampre–Merida	+ 0"

General classification after stage 2
Rank	Rider	Team	Time
1	Chris Froome (GBR)	Team Sky	9h 34' 13"
2	Andrew Talansky (USA)	Garmin–Sharp	+ 6"
3	Robert Kišerlovski (CRO)	RadioShack–Leopard	+ 13"
4	Richie Porte (AUS)	Team Sky	+ 15"
5	Rui Costa (POR)	Movistar Team	+ 16"
6	Thibaut Pinot (FRA)	FDJ	+ 17"
7	Stef Clement (NED)	Blanco Pro Cycling	+ 17"
8	Alejandro Valverde (SPA)	Movistar Team	+ 17"
9	Tom Danielson (USA)	Garmin–Sharp	+ 17"
10	Wilco Kelderman (NED)	Blanco Pro Cycling	+ 18"

=== Stage 3 ===
26 April 2013 — Payerne to Payerne, 181 kilometres (112 mi)

Stage 3 results
Rank	Rider	Team	Time
1	Gianni Meersman (BEL)	Omega Pharma–Quick-Step	4h 19' 03"
2	Francesco Gavazzi (ITA)	Astana	+ 0"
3	Michael Albasini (SWI)	Orica–GreenEDGE	+ 0"
4	Luka Mezgec (SLO)	Argos–Shimano	+ 0"
5	Juan José Lobato (SPA)	Euskaltel–Euskadi	+ 0"
6	Danilo Wyss (SWI)	BMC Racing Team	+ 0"
7	Rinaldo Nocentini (ITA)	Ag2r–La Mondiale	+ 0"
8	Roberto Ferrari (ITA)	Lampre–Merida	+ 0"
9	Reinardt Janse van Rensburg (SAF)	Argos–Shimano	+ 0"
10	Xavier Florencio (SPA)	Team Katusha	+ 0"

General classification after stage 3
Rank	Rider	Team	Time
1	Chris Froome (GBR)	Team Sky	13h 53' 16"
2	Andrew Talansky (USA)	Garmin–Sharp	+ 6"
3	Gianni Meersman (BEL)	Omega Pharma–Quick-Step	+ 9"
4	Robert Kišerlovski (CRO)	RadioShack–Leopard	+ 13"
5	Richie Porte (AUS)	Team Sky	+ 15"
6	Rui Costa (POR)	Movistar Team	+ 16"
7	Thibaut Pinot (FRA)	FDJ	+ 17"
8	Stef Clement (NED)	Blanco Pro Cycling	+ 17"
9	Alejandro Valverde (SPA)	Movistar Team	+ 17"
10	Tom Danielson (USA)	Garmin–Sharp	+ 17"

=== Stage 4 ===
27 April 2013 — Marly to Les Diablerets, 182 kilometres (113 mi)

Stage 4 results
Rank	Rider	Team	Time
1	Simon Špilak (SLO)	Team Katusha	5h 10' 00"
2	Chris Froome (GBR)	Team Sky	+ 0"
3	Rui Costa (POR)	Movistar Team	+ 1' 03"
4	Alejandro Valverde (SPA)	Movistar Team	+ 1' 03"
5	Wilco Kelderman (NED)	Blanco Pro Cycling	+ 1' 03"
6	Carlos Betancur (COL)	Ag2r–La Mondiale	+ 1' 03"
7	Marcel Wyss (SWI)	IAM Cycling	+ 1' 03"
8	Jean-Christophe Peraud (FRA)	Ag2r–La Mondiale	+ 1' 03"
9	Robert Kišerlovski (CRO)	RadioShack–Leopard	+ 1' 03"
10	Igor Antón (SPA)	Euskaltel–Euskadi	+ 1' 03"

General classification after stage 4
Rank	Rider	Team	Time
1	Chris Froome (GBR)	Team Sky	19h 03' 10"
2	Simon Špilak (SLO)	Team Katusha	+ 47"
3	Rui Costa (POR)	Movistar Team	+ 1' 21"
4	Robert Kišerlovski (CRO)	RadioShack–Leopard	+ 1' 22"
5	Thibaut Pinot (FRA)	FDJ	+ 1' 26"
6	Alejandro Valverde (SPA)	Movistar Team	+ 1' 26"
7	Tom Danielson (USA)	Garmin–Sharp	+1' 26"
8	Wilco Kelderman (NED)	Blanco Pro Cycling	+ 1' 27"
9	Carlos Betancur (COL)	Ag2r–La Mondiale	+ 1' 28"
10	Marcel Wyss (SWI)	IAM Cycling	+ 1' 43"

=== Stage 5 ===
28 April 2013 — Geneva, 18.6 kilometres (11.6 mi), individual time trial (ITT)

Stage 5 results
Rank	Rider	Team	Time
1	Tony Martin (GER)	Omega Pharma–Quick-Step	21' 07"
2	Adriano Malori (ITA)	Lampre–Merida	+ 16"
3	Chris Froome (GBR)	Team Sky	+ 34"
4	Lieuwe Westra (NED)	Vacansoleil–DCM	+ 36"
5	Simon Špilak (SLO)	Team Katusha	+ 41"
6	Stef Clement (NED)	Blanco Pro Cycling	+ 50"
7	Richie Porte (AUS)	Team Sky	+ 52"
8	Mads Christensen (DEN)	Saxo–Tinkoff	+ 55"
9	Rohan Dennis (AUS)	Garmin–Sharp	+ 56"
10	Tobias Ludvigsson (SWE)	Argos–Shimano	+ 1' 01"

General classification after stage 5
Rank	Rider	Team	Time
1	Chris Froome (GBR)	Team Sky	19h 24' 51"
2	Simon Špilak (SLO)	Team Katusha	+ 54"
3	Rui Costa (POR)	Movistar Team	+ 1' 49"
4	Tom Danielson (USA)	Garmin–Sharp	+1' 54"
5	Wilco Kelderman (NED)	Blanco Pro Cycling	+ 2' 03"
6	Jean-Christophe Peraud (FRA)	Ag2r–La Mondiale	+ 2' 14"
7	Jurgen Van den Broeck (BEL)	Lotto–Belisol	+ 2' 16"
8	Richie Porte (AUS)	Team Sky	+ 2' 31"
9	Alejandro Valverde (SPA)	Movistar Team	+ 2' 32"
10	Marcel Wyss (SWI)	IAM Cycling	+ 2' 41"

== Classification leadership table ==
In the 2013 Tour de Romandie, four different jerseys were awarded. For the general classification, calculated by adding each cyclist's finishing times on each stage, and allowing time bonuses in mass-start stages, the leader received a yellow jersey. This classification was considered the most important of the 2013 Tour de Romandie, and the winner of the classification was considered the winner of the race.

Additionally, there was a young rider classification, which awarded a white jersey. This was decided the same way as the general classification, but only riders born after 1 January 1988 were eligible to be ranked in the classification. There was also a mountains classification, the leadership of which was marked by a pink jersey. In the mountains classification, points were won by reaching the top of a climb before other cyclists, with more points available for the higher-categorised climbs; there were fourteen categorised climbs in the race, split into three distinctive categories.

The fourth jersey represented the sprints classification, marked by a green jersey. In the sprints classification, cyclists received points for finishing in the top 3 at intermediate sprint points during each stage, with the exception of the individual time trial stages. There was also a classification for teams, in which the times of the best three cyclists per team on each stage were added together; the leading team at the end of the race was the team with the lowest total time.

Stage	Winner	General classification	Mountains classification	Young rider classification	Team classification
P	Chris Froome	Chris Froome	Chris Froome	Thibaut Pinot	Team Sky
1	Gianni Meersman	Chris Froome	Garikoitz Bravo	Thibaut Pinot	Team Sky
2	Ramūnas Navardauskas	Chris Froome	Garikoitz Bravo	Thibaut Pinot	Team Sky
3	Gianni Meersman	Chris Froome	Marcus Burghardt	Thibaut Pinot	Team Sky
4	Simon Špilak	Chris Froome	Marcus Burghardt	Thibaut Pinot	Team Sky
5	Tony Martin	Chris Froome	Marcus Burghardt	Wilco Kelderman	Team Sky
Final		Chris Froome	Marcus Burghardt	Wilco Kelderman	Team Sky

== Classification standings ==
=== General classification ===
Final general classification (1–10)
Rank	Rider	Team	Time
1	Chris Froome (GBR)	Team Sky	19h 24' 51"
2	Simon Špilak (SLO)	Team Katusha	+ 54"
3	Rui Costa (POR)	Movistar Team	+ 1' 49"
4	Tom Danielson (USA)	Garmin–Sharp	+1' 54"
5	Wilco Kelderman (NED)	Blanco Pro Cycling	+ 2' 03"
6	Jean-Christophe Peraud (FRA)	Ag2r–La Mondiale	+ 2' 14"
7	Jurgen Van den Broeck (BEL)	Lotto–Belisol	+ 2' 16"
8	Richie Porte (AUS)	Team Sky	+ 2' 31"
9	Alejandro Valverde (SPA)	Movistar Team	+ 2' 32"
10	Marcel Wyss (SWI)	IAM Cycling	+ 2' 41"

=== Mountains classification ===
Final mountains classification (1–10)
Rank	Rider	Team	Points
1	Marcus Burghardt (GER)	BMC Racing Team	46
2	Garikoitz Bravo (SPA)	Euskaltel–Euskadi	29
3	Arthur Vichot (FRA)	FDJ	26
4	Pierre Rolland (FRA)	Team Europcar	19
5	Julien Bérard (FRA)	Ag2r–La Mondiale	18
6	Matthias Brändle (AUT)	IAM Cycling	18
7	Chris Froome (GBR)	Team Sky	13
8	Simon Špilak (SLO)	Team Katusha	12
9	Tom Dumoulin (NED)	Argos–Shimano	10
10	Pello Bilbao (SPA)	Euskaltel–Euskadi	10

=== Young rider classification ===
Final young rider classification (1–10)
Rank	Rider	Team	Time
1	Wilco Kelderman (NED)	Blanco Pro Cycling	19h 26' 54"
2	Thibaut Pinot (FRA)	FDJ	+ 40"
3	Carlos Betancur (COL)	Ag2r–La Mondiale	+ 48"
4	Sébastien Reichenbach (SWI)	IAM Cycling	+ 3' 34"
5	Georg Preidler (AUT)	Argos–Shimano	+ 3' 48"
6	Tobias Ludvigsson (SWE)	Argos–Shimano	+ 4' 16"
7	Dominik Nerz (GER)	BMC Racing Team	+ 8' 18"
8	Moreno Moser (ITA)	Cannondale	+ 10' 14"
9	George Bennett (NZL)	RadioShack–Leopard	+ 16' 14"
10	Nelson Oliveira (POR)	RadioShack–Leopard	+ 18' 52"

=== Team classification ===
Final team classification (1–10)
Rank	Team	Time
1	(United Kingdom) Team Sky	58h 20' 44"
2	(Netherlands) RadioShack–Leopard	+ 4' 23"
3	(Spain) Movistar Team	+ 5' 19"
4	(Switzerland) IAM Cycling	+ 5' 22"
5	(France) Ag2r–La Mondiale	+ 6' 30"
6	(Spain) Euskaltel–Euskadi	+ 7' 51"
7	(Denmark) Saxo–Tinkoff	+ 8' 13"
8	(Italy) Lampre–Merida	+ 8' 21"
9	(Kazakhstan) Astana	+ 10' 19"
10	Team Katusha	+ 10' 42"
