= 2018 Tour de Suisse =

Cycling race

2018 UCI World Tour, race 24 of 37

Race details
- Dates: 9–17 June 2018
- Stages: 9
- Distance: 1,215.4 km (755.2 mi)

Results
Jersey awarded to the overall winner	Winner	Richie Porte (AUS)	(BMC Racing Team)
	Second	Jakob Fuglsang (DEN)	(Astana)
	Third	Nairo Quintana (COL)	(Movistar Team)
Jersey awarded to the points classification winner	Points	Peter Sagan (SVK)	(Bora–Hansgrohe)
Jersey awarded to the mountains classification winner	Mountains	Mark Christian (GBR)	(Aqua Blue Sport)
	Team	Astana	

The 2018 Tour de Suisse was a road cycling stage race that took place between 9 and 17 June 2018 in Switzerland. It was the 82nd edition of the Tour de Suisse and the twenty-fourth event of the 2018 UCI World Tour. The race was won by Richie Porte of BMC Racing Team.

== Route ==
Stage characteristics and winners
Stage	Date	Route	Distance	Type	Winner
1	9 June	Frauenfeld to Frauenfeld	18.3 km (11.4 mi)	Team time trial	BMC Racing Team
2	10 June	Frauenfeld to Frauenfeld	155 km (96.3 mi)	Hilly stage	Peter Sagan (SVK)
3	11 June	Oberstammheim to Gansingen	182.8 km (113.6 mi)	Hilly stage	Sonny Colbrelli (ITA)
4	12 June	Gansingen to Gstaad	189.2 km (117.6 mi)	Hilly stage	Christopher Juul-Jensen (DEN)
5	13 June	Gstaad to Leukerbad	155.7 km (96.7 mi)	Mountain stage	Diego Ulissi (ITA)
6	14 June	Fiesch to Gommiswald	186 km (115.6 mi)	Mountain stage	Søren Kragh Andersen (DEN)
7	15 June	Eschenbach to Arosa	170.5 km (105.9 mi)	Mountain stage	Nairo Quintana (COL)
8	16 June	Bellinzona to Bellinzona	123.8 km (76.9 mi)	Plain stage	Arnaud Démare (FRA)
9	17 June	Bellinzona to Bellinzona	34.1 km (21.2 mi)	Individual time trial	Stefan Küng (SUI)
Total			1,215.4 km (755.2 mi)		

== Teams ==
As the Tour de Suisse is a UCI World Tour event, all eighteen UCI WorldTeams were invited automatically and obliged to enter a team in the race. Three UCI Professional Continental teams competed, completing the 21-team peloton.

UCI WorldTeams

- AG2R La Mondiale
- Astana
- Bahrain–Merida
- BMC Racing Team
- Bora–Hansgrohe
- EF Education First–Drapac p/b Cannondale
- Team Dimension Data
- Team Katusha–Alpecin
- LottoNL–Jumbo
- Lotto–Soudal
- Movistar Team
- Mitchelton–Scott
- Quick-Step Floors
- Team Sky
- Team Sunweb
- Trek–Segafredo
- UAE Team Emirates
- Groupama–FDJ

UCI Professional Continental teams

- Aqua Blue Sport
- Direct Énergie
- Nippo–Vini Fantini–Europa Ovini

== Stages ==
=== Stage 1 ===
10 June 2018 — Frauenfeld to Frauenfeld, 18.3 km (11.4 mi) (TTT)

Stage 1 Result
Rank	Team	Time
1	BMC Racing Team	20' 18"
2	Team Sunweb	+ 20"
3	Quick-Step Floors	+ 27"
4	Bora–Hansgrohe	+ 27"
5	Mitchelton–Scott	+ 29"
6	Movistar Team	+ 33"
7	Bahrain–Merida	+ 36"
8	Groupama–FDJ	+ 45"
9	Team Katusha–Alpecin	+ 46"
10	UAE Team Emirates	+ 50"

General Classification after Stage 1
Rank	Rider	Team	Time
1	Stefan Küng (SUI)	BMC Racing Team	20' 18"
2	Richie Porte (AUS)	BMC Racing Team	+ 0"
3	Greg Van Avermaet (BEL)	BMC Racing Team	+ 0"
4	Tejay van Garderen (USA)	BMC Racing Team	+ 0"
5	Wilco Kelderman (NED)	Team Sunweb	+ 20"
6	Sam Oomen (NED)	Team Sunweb	+ 20"
7	Søren Kragh Andersen (DEN)	Team Sunweb	+ 20"
8	Michael Matthews (AUS)	Team Sunweb	+ 20"
9	Simon Gerrans (AUS)	BMC Racing Team	+ 25"
10	Philippe Gilbert (BEL)	Quick-Step Floors	+ 27"

=== Stage 2 ===
10 June 2018 — Frauenfeld to Frauenfeld, 155 km (96 mi)

Stage 2 Result
Rank	Rider	Team	Time
1	Peter Sagan (SVK)	Bora–Hansgrohe	3h 50' 09"
2	Fernando Gaviria (COL)	Quick-Step Floors	+ 0"
3	Nathan Haas (AUS)	Team Katusha–Alpecin	+ 0"
4	Michael Matthews (AUS)	Team Sunweb	+ 0"
5	Mark Padun (UKR)	Bahrain–Merida	+ 0"
6	Enrico Gasparotto (ITA)	Bahrain–Merida	+ 0"
7	Enrico Battaglin (ITA)	LottoNL–Jumbo	+ 0"
8	Greg Van Avermaet (BEL)	BMC Racing Team	+ 0"
9	Arthur Vichot (FRA)	Groupama–FDJ	+ 0"
10	Steven Kruijswijk (NED)	LottoNL–Jumbo	+ 0"

General Classification after Stage 2
Rank	Rider	Team	Time
1	Stefan Küng (SUI)	BMC Racing Team	4h 10' 24"
2	Greg Van Avermaet (BEL)	BMC Racing Team	+ 3"
3	Richie Porte (AUS)	BMC Racing Team	+ 3"
4	Tejay van Garderen (USA)	BMC Racing Team	+ 3"
5	Peter Sagan (SVK)	Bora–Hansgrohe	+ 20"
6	Michael Matthews (AUS)	Team Sunweb	+ 23"
7	Wilco Kelderman (NED)	Team Sunweb	+ 23"
8	Sam Oomen (NED)	Team Sunweb	+ 23"
9	Simon Gerrans (AUS)	BMC Racing Team	+ 28"
10	Gregor Mühlberger (AUT)	Bora–Hansgrohe	+ 30"

=== Stage 3 ===
11 June 2018 — Oberstammheim to Gansingen, 182.8 km (113.6 mi)

Stage 3 Result
Rank	Rider	Team	Time
1	Sonny Colbrelli (ITA)	Bahrain–Merida	4h 39' 51"
2	Fernando Gaviria (COL)	Quick-Step Floors	+ 0"
3	Peter Sagan (SVK)	Bora–Hansgrohe	+ 0"
4	Michael Albasini (SUI)	Mitchelton–Scott	+ 0"
5	Magnus Cort Nielsen (DEN)	Astana	+ 0"
6	Michael Matthews (AUS)	Team Sunweb	+ 0"
7	Enrico Battaglin (ITA)	LottoNL–Jumbo	+ 0"
8	Jasper Stuyven (BEL)	Trek–Segafredo	+ 0"
9	Diego Ulissi (ITA)	UAE Team Emirates	+ 0"
10	Sep Vanmarcke (BEL)	EF Education First–Drapac	+ 0"

General Classification after Stage 3
Rank	Rider	Team	Time
1	Stefan Küng (SUI)	BMC Racing Team	8h 50' 15"
2	Greg Van Avermaet (BEL)	BMC Racing Team	+ 3"
3	Richie Porte (AUS)	BMC Racing Team	+ 3"
4	Tejay van Garderen (USA)	BMC Racing Team	+ 3"
5	Peter Sagan (SVK)	Bora–Hansgrohe	+ 16"
6	Michael Matthews (AUS)	Team Sunweb	+ 23"
7	Wilco Kelderman (NED)	Team Sunweb	+ 23"
8	Sam Oomen (NED)	Team Sunweb	+ 23"
9	Gregor Mühlberger (AUT)	Bora–Hansgrohe	+ 30"
10	Enric Mas (ESP)	Quick-Step Floors	+ 30"

=== Stage 4 ===
12 June 2018 — Gansingen to Gstaad, 189.2 km (117.6 mi)

Stage 4 Result
Rank	Rider	Team	Time
1	Christopher Juul-Jensen (DEN)	Mitchelton–Scott	4h 35' 56"
2	Michael Matthews (AUS)	Team Sunweb	+ 8"
3	Yves Lampaert (BEL)	Quick-Step Floors	+ 8"
4	Peter Sagan (SVK)	Bora–Hansgrohe	+ 8"
5	Sonny Colbrelli (ITA)	Bahrain–Merida	+ 8"
6	Magnus Cort Nielsen (DEN)	Astana	+ 8"
7	Enrico Battaglin (ITA)	LottoNL–Jumbo	+ 8"
8	Michael Albasini (SUI)	Mitchelton–Scott	+ 8"
9	Bjorg Lambrecht (BEL)	Lotto–Soudal	+ 8"
10	José Gonçalves (POR)	Team Katusha–Alpecin	+ 8"

General Classification after Stage 4
Rank	Rider	Team	Time
1	Stefan Küng (SUI)	BMC Racing Team	13h 26' 19"
2	Greg Van Avermaet (BEL)	BMC Racing Team	+ 3"
3	Richie Porte (AUS)	BMC Racing Team	+ 3"
4	Tejay van Garderen (USA)	BMC Racing Team	+ 3"
5	Peter Sagan (SVK)	Bora–Hansgrohe	+ 16"
6	Michael Matthews (AUS)	Team Sunweb	+ 17"
7	Wilco Kelderman (NED)	Team Sunweb	+ 23"
8	Sam Oomen (NED)	Team Sunweb	+ 23"
9	Gregor Mühlberger (AUT)	Bora–Hansgrohe	+ 30"
10	Enric Mas (ESP)	Quick-Step Floors	+ 30"

=== Stage 5 ===
13 June 2018 — Gstaad to Leukerbad, 155.7 km (96.7 mi)

Stage 5 Result
Rank	Rider	Team	Time
1	Diego Ulissi (ITA)	UAE Team Emirates	3h 37' 31"
2	Enric Mas (ESP)	Quick-Step Floors	+ 0"
3	Tom-Jelte Slagter (NED)	Team Dimension Data	+ 0"
4	Wilco Kelderman (NED)	Team Sunweb	+ 0"
5	Bauke Mollema (NED)	Trek–Segafredo	+ 0"
6	Simon Špilak (SLO)	Team Katusha–Alpecin	+ 0"
7	Nairo Quintana (COL)	Movistar Team	+ 0"
8	Richie Porte (AUS)	BMC Racing Team	+ 0"
9	Steven Kruijswijk (NED)	LottoNL–Jumbo	+ 0"
10	Bjorg Lambrecht (BEL)	Lotto–Soudal	+ 0"

General Classification after Stage 6
Rank	Rider	Team	Time
1	Richie Porte (AUS)	BMC Racing Team	17h 03' 53"
2	Wilco Kelderman (NED)	Team Sunweb	+ 20"
3	Sam Oomen (NED)	Team Sunweb	+ 20"
4	Enric Mas (ESP)	Quick-Step Floors	+ 21"
5	Jack Haig (AUS)	Mitchelton–Scott	+ 29"
6	Nairo Quintana (COL)	Movistar Team	+ 33"
7	Ion Izagirre (ESP)	Bahrain–Merida	+ 35"
8	Diego Ulissi (ITA)	UAE Team Emirates	+ 40"
9	Simon Špilak (SLO)	Team Katusha–Alpecin	+ 46"
10	Mikel Landa (ESP)	Movistar Team	+ 47"

=== Stage 6 ===
14 June 2018 — Fiesch to Gommiswald, 186 km (116 mi)

Stage 6 Result
Rank	Rider	Team	Time
1	Søren Kragh Andersen (DEN)	Team Sunweb	4h 59' 53"
2	Nathan Haas (AUS)	Team Katusha–Alpecin	+ 10"
3	Gorka Izagirre (ESP)	Bahrain–Merida	+ 24"
4	Maxime Monfort (BEL)	Lotto–Soudal	+ 25"
5	Cyril Gautier (FRA)	AG2R La Mondiale	+ 25"
6	Richie Porte (AUS)	BMC Racing Team	+ 26"
7	Michael Gogl (AUT)	Trek–Segafredo	+ 29"
8	Diego Ulissi (ITA)	UAE Team Emirates	+ 39"
9	Arthur Vichot (FRA)	Groupama–FDJ	+ 39"
10	Mathias Frank (SUI)	AG2R La Mondiale	+ 39"

General Classification after Stage 6
Rank	Rider	Team	Time
1	Richie Porte (AUS)	BMC Racing Team	22h 04' 13"
2	Wilco Kelderman (NED)	Team Sunweb	+ 32"
3	Sam Oomen (NED)	Team Sunweb	+ 32"
4	Enric Mas (ESP)	Quick-Step Floors	+ 33"
5	Jack Haig (AUS)	Mitchelton–Scott	+ 41"
6	Nairo Quintana (COL)	Movistar Team	+ 45"
7	Ion Izagirre (ESP)	Bahrain–Merida	+ 48"
8	Diego Ulissi (ITA)	UAE Team Emirates	+ 52"
9	Simon Špilak (SLO)	Team Katusha–Alpecin	+ 58"
10	Mikel Landa (ESP)	Movistar Team	+ 59"

=== Stage 7 ===
15 June 2018 — Eschenbach to Arosa, 170.5 km (105.9 mi)

Stage 7 Result
Rank	Rider	Team	Time
1	Nairo Quintana (COL)	Movistar Team	4h 01' 39"
2	Jakob Fuglsang (DEN)	Astana	+ 22"
3	Richie Porte (AUS)	BMC Racing Team	+ 22"
4	Gregor Mühlberger (AUT)	Bora–Hansgrohe	+ 38"
5	Wilco Kelderman (NED)	Team Sunweb	+ 38"
6	Enric Mas (ESP)	Quick-Step Floors	+ 38"
7	Igor Anton (ESP)	Team Dimension Data	+ 38"
8	Steven Kruijswijk (NED)	LottoNL–Jumbo	+ 50"
9	Mikel Landa (ESP)	Movistar Team	+ 50"
10	Sam Oomen (NED)	Team Sunweb	+ 59"

General Classification after Stage 7
Rank	Rider	Team	Time
1	Richie Porte (AUS)	BMC Racing Team	26h 06' 10"
2	Nairo Quintana (COL)	Movistar Team	+ 17"
3	Wilco Kelderman (NED)	Team Sunweb	+ 52"
4	Enric Mas (ESP)	Quick-Step Floors	+ 53"
5	Sam Oomen (NED)	Team Sunweb	+ 1' 13"
6	Jakob Fuglsang (DEN)	Astana	+ 1' 28"
7	Mikel Landa (ESP)	Movistar Team	+ 1' 31"
8	Steven Kruijswijk (NED)	LottoNL–Jumbo	+ 1' 37"
9	Simon Špilak (SLO)	Team Katusha–Alpecin	+ 1' 48"
8	Bauke Mollema (NED)	Trek–Segafredo	+ 2' 26"

=== Stage 8 ===
16 June 2018 — Bellinzona to Bellinzona, 123.8 km (76.9 mi)

Stage 8 Result
Rank	Rider	Team	Time
1	Arnaud Démare (FRA)	Groupama–FDJ	2h 41' 07"
2	Fernando Gaviria (COL)	Quick-Step Floors	+ 0"
3	Alexander Kristoff (NOR)	UAE Team Emirates	+ 0"
4	Peter Sagan (SVK)	Bora–Hansgrohe	+ 0"
5	Jasper Stuyven (BEL)	Trek–Segafredo	+ 0"
6	John Degenkolb (GER)	Trek–Segafredo	+ 0"
7	Reinardt Janse van Rensburg (RSA)	Team Dimension Data	+ 0"
8	Sonny Colbrelli (ITA)	Bahrain–Merida	+ 0"
9	André Greipel (GER)	Lotto–Soudal	+ 0"
10	Michael Matthews (AUS)	Team Sunweb	+ 0"

General Classification after Stage 8
Rank	Rider	Team	Time
1	Richie Porte (AUS)	BMC Racing Team	28h 47' 17"
2	Nairo Quintana (COL)	Movistar Team	+ 17"
3	Wilco Kelderman (NED)	Team Sunweb	+ 52"
4	Enric Mas (ESP)	Quick-Step Floors	+ 53"
5	Sam Oomen (NED)	Team Sunweb	+ 1' 13"
6	Jakob Fuglsang (DEN)	Astana	+ 1' 28"
7	Mikel Landa (ESP)	Movistar Team	+ 1' 31"
8	Steven Kruijswijk (NED)	LottoNL–Jumbo	+ 1' 37"
9	Simon Špilak (SLO)	Team Katusha–Alpecin	+ 1' 48"
8	Bauke Mollema (NED)	Trek–Segafredo	+ 2' 26"

=== Stage 9 ===
17 June 2018 — Bellinzona to Bellinzona, 34.1 km (21.2 mi) Individual time trial

Stage 9 Result
Rank	Rider	Team	Time
1	Stefan Küng (SUI)	BMC Racing Team	39' 44"
2	Søren Kragh Andersen (DEN)	Team Sunweb	+ 19"
3	Tejay van Garderen (USA)	BMC Racing Team	+ 23"
4	Maciej Bodnar (POL)	Bora–Hansgrohe	+ 26"
5	Michael Matthews (AUS)	Team Sunweb	+ 26"
6	Pavel Sivakov (RUS)	Team Sky	+ 37"
7	Cameron Meyer (AUS)	Mitchelton–Scott	+ 37"
8	Jakob Fuglsang (DEN)	Astana	+ 38"
9	Nikias Arndt (GER)	Team Sunweb	+ 44"
10	Nelson Oliveira (POR)	Movistar Team	+ 46"

General Classification after Stage 9
Rank	Rider	Team	Time
1	Richie Porte (AUS)	BMC Racing Team	29h 28' 05"
2	Jakob Fuglsang (DEN)	Astana	+ 1' 02"
3	Nairo Quintana (COL)	Movistar Team	+ 1' 12"
4	Enric Mas (ESP)	Quick-Step Floors	+ 1' 20"
5	Wilco Kelderman (NED)	Team Sunweb	+ 1' 21"
6	Simon Špilak (SLO)	Team Katusha–Alpecin	+ 1' 47"
7	Sam Oomen (NED)	Team Sunweb	+ 1' 52"
8	Steven Kruijswijk (NED)	LottoNL–Jumbo	+ 1' 59"
9	Diego Ulissi (ITA)	UAE Team Emirates	+ 2' 27"
10	Arthur Vichot (FRA)	Groupama–FDJ	+ 2' 41"

== Classification leadership table ==
In the Tour de Suisse, four different jerseys were awarded. The general classification was calculated by adding each cyclist's finishing times on each stage, and allowing time bonuses for the first three finishers at intermediate sprints (three seconds to first, two seconds to second and one second to third) and at the finish of mass-start stages; these were awarded to the first three finishers on all stages except for the individual time trial: the stage winner won a ten-second bonus, with six and four seconds for the second and third riders respectively. The leader of the classification received a yellow jersey; it was considered the most important of the 2017 Tour de Suisse, and the winner of the classification was considered the winner of the race.

Additionally, there was a points classification, which awarded a black jersey. In the points classification, cyclists received points for finishing in the top 5 in a stage. For winning a stage, a rider earned 10 points, with 8 for second, 6 for third, 4 for fourth and 2 for 5th place. Points towards the classification could also be accrued – awarded on a 6–3–1 scale – at intermediate sprint points during each stage; these intermediate sprints also offered bonus seconds towards the general classification as noted above.

Points for the mountains classification
Position	1	2	3	4	5
Points for Hors-category	20	15	10	6	4
Points for Category 1	12	8	6	4	2
Points for Category 2	8	6	4	2	1
Points for Category 3	3	2	1	0	

There was also a mountains classification, the leadership of which was marked by a blue jersey. In the mountains classification, points towards the classification were won by reaching the top of a climb before other cyclists. Each climb was categorised as either hors, first, second, or third-category, with more points available for the higher-categorised climbs.

The fourth and final jersey represented the classification for Swiss riders, marked by a red jersey. This was decided the same way as the general classification, but only riders born in Switzerland were eligible to be ranked in the classification. There was also a classification for teams, in which the times of the best three cyclists per team on each stage were added together; the leading team at the end of the race was the team with the lowest total time. In addition, there was a combativity award given after each stage to the rider considered, by a jury, to have been most active, or in the case of the individual time trials, the stage winner was automatically deemed the most active rider.

Classification leadership by stage
Stage	Winner	General classification	Mountains classification	Points classification	Young rider classification	Team classification
1	BMC Racing Team	Stefan Küng	Not awarded	Not awarded	Sam Oomen	BMC Racing Team
2	Peter Sagan	Stefan Küng	Filippo Zaccanti	Calvin Watson	Sam Oomen	BMC Racing Team
3	Sonny Colbrelli	Stefan Küng	Filippo Zaccanti	Calvin Watson	Sam Oomen	BMC Racing Team
4	Christopher Juul-Jensen	Stefan Küng	Filippo Zaccanti	Peter Sagan	Sam Oomen	BMC Racing Team
5	Diego Ulissi	Richie Porte	Romain Sicard	Peter Sagan	Sam Oomen	Movistar Team
6	Søren Kragh Andersen	Richie Porte	Mark Christian	Peter Sagan	Sam Oomen	Movistar Team
7	Nairo Quintana	Richie Porte	Mark Christian	Michael Matthews	Enric Mas	Astana
8	Arnaud Démare	Richie Porte	Mark Christian	Peter Sagan	Enric Mas	Astana
9	Stefan Küng	Richie Porte	Mark Christian	Peter Sagan	Enric Mas	Astana
Final		Richie Porte	Mark Christian	Peter Sagan	Enric Mas	Astana
