= Marcel Wyss =

Swiss cyclist

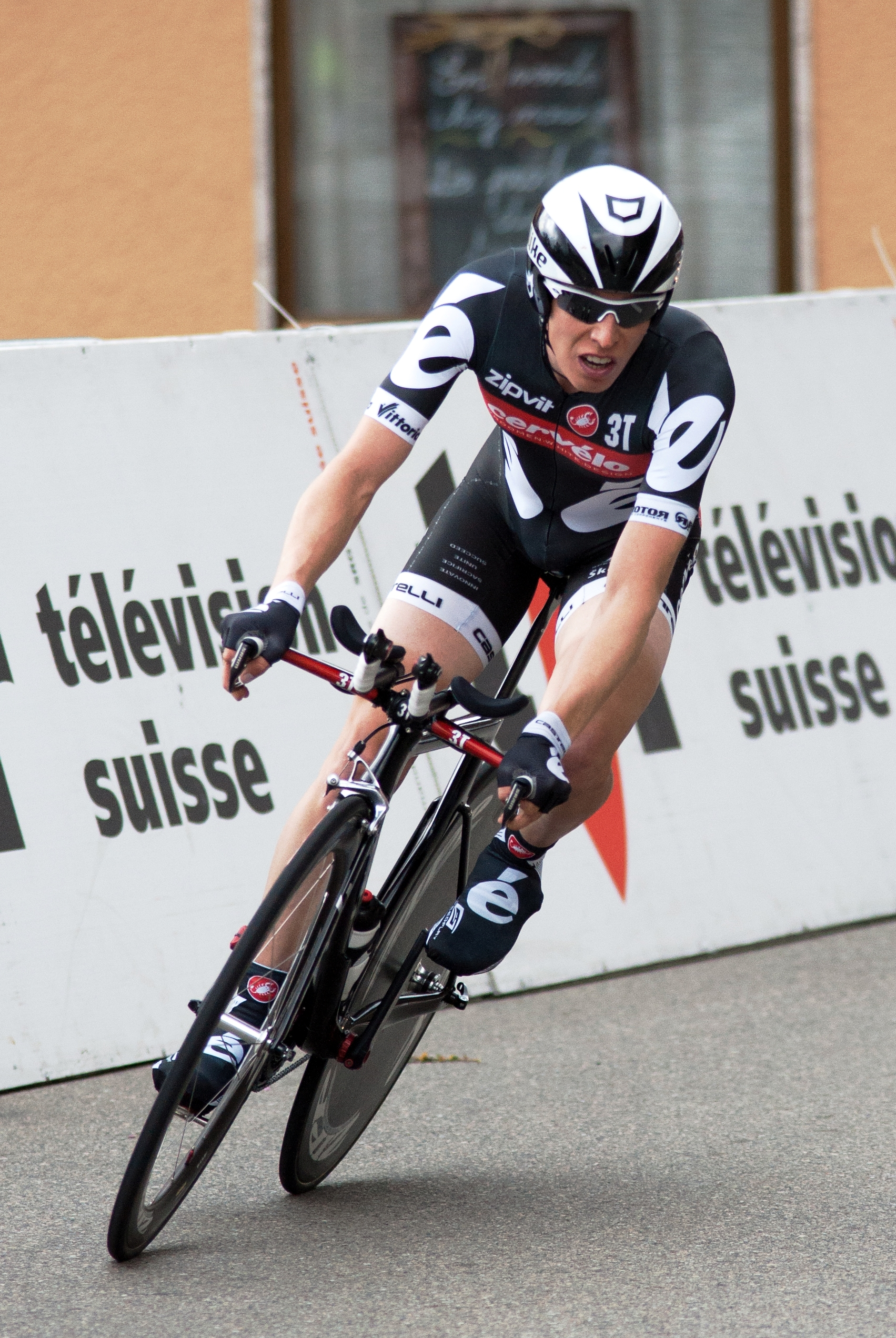
- Wyss riding in the 2010 Tour de Romandie

Personal information
- Full name: Marcel Wyss
- Nickname: Mäsi
- Born: 25 June 1986 (age 40) Langnau im Emmental, Switzerland
- Height: 1.77 m (5 ft 9 1/2 in)
- Weight: 64 kg (141 lb)

Cycling career
- Sport: Cycling
- Current team: Thömus | WindowMaster by Wyss Training
- Discipline: Road
- Role: Rider
- Rider type: All-rounder

Amateur teams
- 2007–2008: Atlas–Romer's Hausbäckerei
- 2008: Scott–American Beef (stagiaire)
- 2022–: Thömus–WindowMaster

Professional teams
- 2009–2010: Cervélo TestTeam
- 2011: Geox–TMC
- 2012: Atlas Personal–Jakroo
- 2012: Team NetApp
- 2013–2016: IAM Cycling

Major wins
- National Junior Road Race Championships (2004); Flèche du Sud (2008); National Under-23 Time Trial Championships (2008); Tour de Berne (2013)

Marcel Wyss (born 25 June 1986) is a Swiss road cyclist, who rides for Swiss amateur team Thömus | WindowMaster by Wyss Training. Wyss previously rode professionally between 2009 and 2016 for the Cervélo TestTeam, Geox–TMC, Atlas Personal–Jakroo, Team NetApp and IAM Cycling teams.

== Major results ==
2004
1st Road race, National Junior Road Championships
2005
3rd Freccia dei Vini
2007
3rd Overall Mainfranken-Tour
4th Overall Flèche du Sud
5th Rund um den Henninger-Turm
2008
National Under-23 Road Championships

1st Time trial
1st Hill climb

1st Overall Flèche du Sud

1st Prologue

4th Time trial, UCI Under-23 Road World Championships
4th Overall Thüringen Rundfahrt der U23
6th Overall Tour de l'Avenir
9th Overall Tour Alsace
2010
8th Overall Tour de Romandie
2011
2nd Time trial, National Road Championships
2012
1st Stage 2b (TTT) Settimana Internazionale di Coppi e Bartali
8th Overall Tour of Austria
2013
1st Tour de Berne
2nd Cholet-Pays de Loire
7th Overall Bayern Rundfahrt
7th Overall Volta a Portugal
10th Overall Tour de Romandie
10th Overall Tour of Britain
2014
9th Overall Bayern Rundfahrt
2015
10th Overall Arctic Race of Norway
2016
8th Overall Tour de l'Ain
2023
2nd Tour de Berne

=== Grand Tour general classification results timeline ===
Grand Tour	2010	2011	2012	2013	2014	2015	2016
Giro d'Italia	38	34	—	—	—	—	40
Tour de France	—	—	—	—	32	60	—
Vuelta a España	—	—	—	—	—	—	21

Legend
—	Did not compete
DNF	Did not finish
