= 2017 Tour de Suisse =

Cycling race

2017 UCI World Tour, race 24 of 37

Race details
- Dates: 10–18 June 2017
- Stages: 9
- Distance: 1,166.3 km (724.7 mi)
- Winning time: 28h 37' 11"

Results
Jersey awarded to the overall winner	Winner	Simon Špilak (SLO)	(Team Katusha–Alpecin)
	Second	Damiano Caruso (ITA)	(BMC Racing Team)
	Third	Steven Kruijswijk (NED)	(LottoNL–Jumbo)
Jersey awarded to the points classification winner	Points	Peter Sagan (SVK)	(Bora–Hansgrohe)
Jersey awarded to the mountains classification winner	Mountains	Lasse Norman Hansen (DEN)	(Aqua Blue Sport)
	Team	AG2R La Mondiale	

The 2017 Tour de Suisse was a road cycling stage race that took place between 10 and 18 June. It was the 81st edition of the Tour de Suisse and the twenty-fourth event of the 2017 UCI World Tour.

For the second time in three years, Slovenian rider Simon Špilak (Team Katusha–Alpecin) won the race after taking the race lead on the seventh stage, soloing to the stage victory when the race visited Austria. He finished 48 seconds clear of BMC Racing Team rider Damiano Caruso, while the podium was completed by LottoNL–Jumbo's Steven Kruijswijk, a further 20 seconds in arrears of Caruso.

In the race's other classifications, Bora–Hansgrohe rider Peter Sagan won the points classification for the sixth time in seven years after further extending his record for stage victories in the race – he won two stages to move to fifteen in his career; Aqua Blue Sport rider Lasse Norman Hansen led the mountains classification for the duration, while the best placed home rider was Mathias Frank (AG2R La Mondiale), finishing in seventh place overall. The teams classification was won by AG2R La Mondiale, with Frank being joined in the top-ten by Domenico Pozzovivo in fourth.

== Teams ==
As the Tour de Suisse was a UCI World Tour event, all eighteen UCI WorldTeams were invited automatically and obliged to enter a team in the race. Four UCI Professional Continental teams competed, completing the 22-team peloton.

UCI WorldTeams

- AG2R La Mondiale
- Astana
- Bahrain–Merida
- BMC Racing Team
- Bora–Hansgrohe
- Cannondale–Drapac
- Team Dimension Data
- FDJ
- Team Katusha–Alpecin
- LottoNL–Jumbo
- Lotto–Soudal
- Movistar Team
- Orica–Scott
- Quick-Step Floors
- Team Sky
- Team Sunweb
- Trek–Segafredo
- UAE Team Emirates

UCI Professional Continental teams

- Aqua Blue Sport
- CCC–Sprandi–Polkowice
- Direct Énergie
- Roompot–Nederlandse Loterij

== Route ==
The race route was partially announced on 21 December 2016, before the full itinerary was confirmed on 2 March 2017.

Stage characteristics and winners
Stage	Date	Route	Distance	Type	Winner
1	10 June	Cham to Cham	6 km (3.7 mi)	Individual time trial	Rohan Dennis (AUS)
2	11 June	Cham to Cham	172.7 km (107.3 mi)	Hilly stage	Philippe Gilbert (BEL)
3	12 June	Menziken to Bern	159.3 km (99.0 mi)	Flat stage	Michael Matthews (AUS)
4	13 June	Bern to Villars-sur-Ollon	150.2 km (93.3 mi)	Mountain stage	Larry Warbasse (USA)
5	14 June	Bex to Cevio	222 km (137.9 mi)	Mountain stage	Peter Sagan (SVK)
6	15 June	Locarno to La Punt	166.7 km (103.6 mi)	Mountain stage	Domenico Pozzovivo (ITA)
7	16 June	Zernez to Sölden (Austria)	160.8 km (99.9 mi)	Mountain stage	Simon Špilak (SLO)
8	17 June	Schaffhausen to Schaffhausen	100 km (62.1 mi)	Hilly stage	Peter Sagan (SVK)
9	18 June	Schaffhausen to Schaffhausen	28.6 km (17.8 mi)	Individual time trial	Rohan Dennis (AUS)
	Total		1,166.3 km (724.7 mi)		

== Stages ==
=== Stage 1 ===
10 June 2017 — Cham, 6 km (3.7 mi), Individual time trial (ITT)

Stage 1 result & General classification after Stage 1
Rank	Rider	Team	Time
1	Rohan Dennis (AUS)	BMC Racing Team	6' 24"
2	Stefan Küng (SUI)	BMC Racing Team	+ 8"
3	Matthias Brändle (AUT)	Trek–Segafredo	+ 9"
4	Michael Matthews (AUS)	Team Sunweb	+ 9"
5	Tom Dumoulin (NED)	Team Sunweb	+ 9"
6	Jonathan Castroviejo (ESP)	Movistar Team	+ 11"
7	Lars Boom (NED)	LottoNL–Jumbo	+ 12"
8	Ryan Mullen (IRL)	Cannondale–Drapac	+ 13"
9	Steven Lammertink (NED)	LottoNL–Jumbo	+ 14"
10	Martin Elmiger (SUI)	BMC Racing Team	+ 14"

=== Stage 2 ===
11 June 2017 – Cham to Cham, 172.7 km (107.3 mi)

Stage 2 result
Rank	Rider	Team	Time
1	Philippe Gilbert (BEL)	Quick-Step Floors	4h 22' 36"
2	Patrick Bevin (NZL)	Cannondale–Drapac	+ 0"
3	Anthony Roux (FRA)	FDJ	+ 0"
4	Michael Albasini (SUI)	Orica–Scott	+ 0"
5	Matteo Trentin (ITA)	Quick-Step Floors	+ 0"
6	Marcus Burghardt (GER)	Bora–Hansgrohe	+ 0"
7	Niccolò Bonifazio (ITA)	Bahrain–Merida	+ 0"
8	Peter Sagan (SVK)	Bora–Hansgrohe	+ 0"
9	Valerio Conti (ITA)	UAE Team Emirates	+ 0"
10	Michael Matthews (AUS)	Team Sunweb	+ 0"

General classification after Stage 2
Rank	Rider	Team	Time
1	Stefan Küng (SUI)	BMC Racing Team	4h 29' 08"
2	Michael Matthews (AUS)	Team Sunweb	+ 1"
3	Tom Dumoulin (NED)	Team Sunweb	+ 1"
4	Lars Boom (NED)	LottoNL–Jumbo	+ 4"
5	Peter Sagan (SVK)	Bora–Hansgrohe	+ 8"
6	Damiano Caruso (ITA)	BMC Racing Team	+ 10"
7	Michael Albasini (SUI)	Orica–Scott	+ 11"
8	Hugo Houle (CAN)	AG2R La Mondiale	+ 12"
9	Patrick Bevin (NZL)	Cannondale–Drapac	+ 13"
10	Matteo Trentin (ITA)	Quick-Step Floors	+ 14"

=== Stage 3 ===
12 June 2017 — Menziken to Bern, 159.3 km (99.0 mi)

Stage 3 result
Rank	Rider	Team	Time
1	Michael Matthews (AUS)	Team Sunweb	3h 49' 48"
2	Peter Sagan (SVK)	Bora–Hansgrohe	+ 0"
3	John Degenkolb (GER)	Trek–Segafredo	+ 0"
4	Tim Wellens (BEL)	Lotto–Soudal	+ 0"
5	Michael Albasini (SUI)	Orica–Scott	+ 0"
6	Patrick Bevin (NZL)	Cannondale–Drapac	+ 0"
7	Arthur Vichot (FRA)	FDJ	+ 0"
8	Matteo Trentin (ITA)	Quick-Step Floors	+ 0"
9	Jan Bakelants (BEL)	AG2R La Mondiale	+ 0"
10	Damiano Caruso (ITA)	BMC Racing Team	+ 0"

General classification after Stage 3
Rank	Rider	Team	Time
1	Michael Matthews (AUS)	Team Sunweb	8h 18' 47"
2	Tom Dumoulin (NED)	Team Sunweb	+ 10"
3	Peter Sagan (SVK)	Bora–Hansgrohe	+ 11"
4	Damiano Caruso (ITA)	BMC Racing Team	+ 19"
5	Michael Albasini (SUI)	Orica–Scott	+ 20"
6	Patrick Bevin (NZL)	Cannondale–Drapac	+ 22"
7	Matteo Trentin (ITA)	Quick-Step Floors	+ 23"
8	John Degenkolb (GER)	Trek–Segafredo	+ 24"
9	Ion Izagirre (ESP)	Bahrain–Merida	+ 25"
10	Marc Soler (ESP)	Movistar Team	+ 25"

=== Stage 4 ===
13 June 2017 – Bern to Villars-sur-Ollon, 150.2 km (93.3 mi)

Stage 4 result
Rank	Rider	Team	Time
1	Larry Warbasse (USA)	Aqua Blue Sport	3h 48' 55"
2	Damiano Caruso (ITA)	BMC Racing Team	+ 40"
3	Steven Kruijswijk (NED)	LottoNL–Jumbo	+ 40"
4	Simon Špilak (SLO)	Team Katusha–Alpecin	+ 40"
5	Domenico Pozzovivo (ITA)	AG2R La Mondiale	+ 44"
6	Mathias Frank (SUI)	AG2R La Mondiale	+ 47"
7	Marc Soler (ESP)	Movistar Team	+ 59"
8	Miguel Ángel López (COL)	Astana	+ 1' 07"
9	Mikel Nieve (ESP)	Team Sky	+ 1' 20"
10	Rui Costa (POR)	UAE Team Emirates	+ 1' 34"

General classification after Stage 4
Rank	Rider	Team	Time
1	Damiano Caruso (ITA)	BMC Racing Team	12h 08' 35"
2	Steven Kruijswijk (NED)	LottoNL–Jumbo	+ 15"
3	Domenico Pozzovivo (ITA)	AG2R La Mondiale	+ 24"
4	Simon Špilak (SLO)	Team Katusha–Alpecin	+ 24"
5	Marc Soler (ESP)	Movistar Team	+ 31"
6	Mathias Frank (SUI)	AG2R La Mondiale	+ 33"
7	Mikel Nieve (ESP)	Team Sky	+ 1' 09"
8	Rui Costa (POR)	UAE Team Emirates	+ 1' 10"
9	Valerio Conti (ITA)	UAE Team Emirates	+ 1' 20"
10	Miguel Ángel López (COL)	Astana	+ 1' 25"

=== Stage 5 ===
14 June 2017 — Bex to Cevio, 222 km (137.9 mi)

Stage 5 result
Rank	Rider	Team	Time
1	Peter Sagan (SVK)	Bora–Hansgrohe	5h 15' 50"
2	Michael Albasini (SUI)	Orica–Scott	+ 0"
3	Matteo Trentin (ITA)	Quick-Step Floors	+ 0"
4	Patrick Bevin (NZL)	Cannondale–Drapac	+ 0"
5	Niccolò Bonifazio (ITA)	Bahrain–Merida	+ 0"
6	Michael Matthews (AUS)	Team Sunweb	+ 0"
7	Sacha Modolo (ITA)	UAE Team Emirates	+ 0"
8	Oscar Gatto (ITA)	Astana	+ 0"
9	Aaron Gate (NZL)	Aqua Blue Sport	+ 0"
10	Owain Doull (GBR)	Team Sky	+ 0"

General classification after Stage 5
Rank	Rider	Team	Time
1	Damiano Caruso (ITA)	BMC Racing Team	17h 24' 24"
2	Steven Kruijswijk (NED)	LottoNL–Jumbo	+ 16"
3	Domenico Pozzovivo (ITA)	AG2R La Mondiale	+ 25"
4	Simon Špilak (SLO)	Team Katusha–Alpecin	+ 25"
5	Marc Soler (ESP)	Movistar Team	+ 32"
6	Mathias Frank (SUI)	AG2R La Mondiale	+ 34"
7	Mikel Nieve (ESP)	Team Sky	+ 1' 10"
8	Rui Costa (POR)	UAE Team Emirates	+ 1' 11"
9	Valerio Conti (ITA)	UAE Team Emirates	+ 1' 21"
10	Tao Geoghegan Hart (GBR)	Team Sky	+ 1' 38"

=== Stage 6 ===
15 June 2017 — Locarno to La Punt, 166.7 km (103.6 mi)

Stage 6 result
Rank	Rider	Team	Time
1	Domenico Pozzovivo (ITA)	AG2R La Mondiale	4h 38' 49"
2	Rui Costa (POR)	UAE Team Emirates	+ 4"
3	Ion Izagirre (ESP)	Bahrain–Merida	+ 4"
4	Mathias Frank (SUI)	AG2R La Mondiale	+ 4"
5	Simon Špilak (SLO)	Team Katusha–Alpecin	+ 12"
6	Steven Kruijswijk (NED)	LottoNL–Jumbo	+ 12"
7	Damiano Caruso (ITA)	BMC Racing Team	+ 15"
8	Pello Bilbao (ESP)	Astana	+ 18"
9	Marc Soler (ESP)	Movistar Team	+ 18"
10	Michael Woods (CAN)	Cannondale–Drapac	+ 21"

General classification after Stage 6
Rank	Rider	Team	Time
1	Domenico Pozzovivo (ITA)	AG2R La Mondiale	22h 03' 28"
2	Damiano Caruso (ITA)	BMC Racing Team	+ 0"
3	Steven Kruijswijk (NED)	LottoNL–Jumbo	+ 13"
4	Simon Špilak (SLO)	Team Katusha–Alpecin	+ 22"
5	Mathias Frank (SUI)	AG2R La Mondiale	+ 23"
6	Marc Soler (ESP)	Movistar Team	+ 35"
7	Rui Costa (POR)	UAE Team Emirates	+ 54"
8	Mikel Nieve (ESP)	Team Sky	+ 1' 19"
9	Pello Bilbao (ESP)	Astana	+ 1' 42"
10	Valerio Conti (ITA)	UAE Team Emirates	+ 3' 02"

=== Stage 7 ===
16 June 2017 — Zernez to Sölden (Austria), 160.8 km (99.9 mi)

Stage 7 result
Rank	Rider	Team	Time
1	Simon Špilak (SLO)	Team Katusha–Alpecin	3h 58' 36"
2	Ion Izagirre (ESP)	Bahrain–Merida	+ 22"
3	Joe Dombrowski (USA)	Cannondale–Drapac	+ 36"
4	Damiano Caruso (ITA)	BMC Racing Team	+ 1' 04"
5	Steven Kruijswijk (NED)	LottoNL–Jumbo	+ 1' 04"
6	Jan Hirt (CZE)	CCC–Sprandi–Polkowice	+ 1' 07"
7	Rein Taaramäe (EST)	Team Katusha–Alpecin	+ 1' 33"
8	Mikel Nieve (ESP)	Team Sky	+ 1' 47"
9	Rui Costa (POR)	UAE Team Emirates	+ 1' 53"
10	Pello Bilbao (ESP)	Astana	+ 2' 40"

General classification after Stage 7
Rank	Rider	Team	Time
1	Simon Špilak (SLO)	Team Katusha–Alpecin	26h 02' 16"
2	Damiano Caruso (ITA)	BMC Racing Team	+ 52"
3	Steven Kruijswijk (NED)	LottoNL–Jumbo	+ 1' 05"
4	Domenico Pozzovivo (ITA)	AG2R La Mondiale	+ 2' 28"
5	Rui Costa (POR)	UAE Team Emirates	+ 2' 35"
6	Mathias Frank (SUI)	AG2R La Mondiale	+ 2' 51"
7	Mikel Nieve (ESP)	Team Sky	+ 2' 54"
8	Ion Izagirre (ESP)	Bahrain–Merida	+ 3' 51"
9	Marc Soler (ESP)	Movistar Team	+ 4' 07"
10	Pello Bilbao (ESP)	Astana	+ 4' 10"

=== Stage 8 ===
17 June 2017 — Schaffhausen to Schaffhausen, 100 km (62.1 mi)

Stage 8 result
Rank	Rider	Team	Time
1	Peter Sagan (SVK)	Bora–Hansgrohe	1h 57' 34"
2	Sacha Modolo (ITA)	UAE Team Emirates	+ 0"
3	Matteo Trentin (ITA)	Quick-Step Floors	+ 0"
4	Magnus Cort (DEN)	Orica–Scott	+ 0"
5	Niccolò Bonifazio (ITA)	Bahrain–Merida	+ 0"
6	Michael Matthews (AUS)	Team Sunweb	+ 0"
7	John Degenkolb (GER)	Trek–Segafredo	+ 0"
8	Oscar Gatto (ITA)	Astana	+ 0"
9	Kévin Reza (FRA)	FDJ	+ 0"
10	Salvatore Puccio (ITA)	Team Sky	+ 0"

General classification after Stage 8
Rank	Rider	Team	Time
1	Simon Špilak (SLO)	Team Katusha–Alpecin	27h 59' 50"
2	Damiano Caruso (ITA)	BMC Racing Team	+ 52"
3	Steven Kruijswijk (NED)	LottoNL–Jumbo	+ 1' 05"
4	Domenico Pozzovivo (ITA)	AG2R La Mondiale	+ 2' 28"
5	Rui Costa (POR)	UAE Team Emirates	+ 2' 35"
6	Mathias Frank (SUI)	AG2R La Mondiale	+ 2' 51"
7	Mikel Nieve (ESP)	Team Sky	+ 2' 54"
8	Ion Izagirre (ESP)	Bahrain–Merida	+ 3' 51"
9	Marc Soler (ESP)	Movistar Team	+ 4' 07"
10	Pello Bilbao (ESP)	Astana	+ 4' 10"

=== Stage 9 ===
18 June 2017 – Schaffhausen to Schaffhausen, 28.6 km (17.8 mi), individual time trial (ITT)

Stage 9 result
Rank	Rider	Team	Time
1	Rohan Dennis (AUS)	BMC Racing Team	36' 30"
2	Stefan Küng (SUI)	BMC Racing Team	+ 29"
3	Damiano Caruso (ITA)	BMC Racing Team	+ 47"
4	Ion Izagirre (ESP)	Bahrain–Merida	+ 51"
5	Simon Špilak (SLO)	Team Katusha–Alpecin	+ 51"
6	Steven Kruijswijk (NED)	LottoNL–Jumbo	+ 54"
7	Marc Soler (ESP)	Movistar Team	+ 58"
8	Domenico Pozzovivo (ITA)	AG2R La Mondiale	+ 1' 00"
9	Tejay van Garderen (USA)	BMC Racing Team	+ 1' 02"
10	Patrick Bevin (NZL)	Cannondale–Drapac	+ 1' 04"

Final general classification
Rank	Rider	Team	Time
1	Simon Špilak (SLO)	Team Katusha–Alpecin	28h 37' 11"
2	Damiano Caruso (ITA)	BMC Racing Team	+ 48"
3	Steven Kruijswijk (NED)	LottoNL–Jumbo	+ 1' 08"
4	Domenico Pozzovivo (ITA)	AG2R La Mondiale	+ 2' 37"
5	Rui Costa (POR)	UAE Team Emirates	+ 3' 09"
6	Ion Izagirre (ESP)	Bahrain–Merida	+ 3' 51"
7	Mathias Frank (SUI)	AG2R La Mondiale	+ 4' 00"
8	Marc Soler (ESP)	Movistar Team	+ 4' 14"
9	Mikel Nieve (ESP)	Team Sky	+ 4' 47"
10	Pello Bilbao (ESP)	Astana	+ 5' 30"

== Classification leadership table ==
In the 2017 Tour de Suisse, four different jerseys were awarded. The general classification was calculated by adding each cyclist's finishing times on each stage, and allowing time bonuses for the first three finishers at intermediate sprints (three seconds to first, two seconds to second and one second to third) and at the finish of mass-start stages; these were awarded to the first three finishers on all stages except for the individual time trial: the stage winner won a ten-second bonus, with six and four seconds for the second and third riders respectively. The leader of the classification received a yellow jersey; it was considered the most important of the 2017 Tour de Suisse, and the winner of the classification was considered the winner of the race.

Additionally, there was a points classification, which awarded a black jersey. In the points classification, cyclists received points for finishing in the top 5 in a stage. For winning a stage, a rider earned 10 points, with 8 for second, 6 for third, 4 for fourth and 2 for 5th place. Points towards the classification could also be accrued – awarded on a 6–3–1 scale – at intermediate sprint points during each stage; these intermediate sprints also offered bonus seconds towards the general classification as noted above.

Points for the mountains classification
Position	1	2	3	4	5
Points for Hors-category	20	15	10	6	4
Points for Category 1	12	8	6	4	2
Points for Category 2	8	6	4	2	1
Points for Category 3	3	2	1	0	

There was also a mountains classification, the leadership of which was marked by a blue jersey. In the mountains classification, points towards the classification were won by reaching the top of a climb before other cyclists. Each climb was categorised as either hors, first, second, or third-category, with more points available for the higher-categorised climbs.

The fourth and final jersey represented the classification for Swiss riders, marked by a red jersey. This was decided the same way as the general classification, but only riders born in Switzerland were eligible to be ranked in the classification. There was also a classification for teams, in which the times of the best three cyclists per team on each stage were added together; the leading team at the end of the race was the team with the lowest total time. In addition, there was a combativity award given after each stage to the rider considered, by a jury, to have been most active, or in the case of the individual time trials, the stage winner was automatically deemed the most active rider.

Classification leadership by stage
Stage	Winner	General classification	Mountains classification	Points classification	Swiss rider classification	Team classification
1	Rohan Dennis	Rohan Dennis	Not awarded	Rohan Dennis	Stefan Küng	BMC Racing Team
2	Philippe Gilbert	Stefan Küng	Lasse Norman Hansen	Nicolas Dougall	Stefan Küng	BMC Racing Team
3	Michael Matthews	Michael Matthews	Lasse Norman Hansen	Michael Matthews	Michael Albasini	Team Sunweb
4	Larry Warbasse	Damiano Caruso	Lasse Norman Hansen	Michael Matthews	Mathias Frank	AG2R La Mondiale
5	Peter Sagan	Damiano Caruso	Lasse Norman Hansen	Peter Sagan	Mathias Frank	AG2R La Mondiale
6	Domenico Pozzovivo	Domenico Pozzovivo	Lasse Norman Hansen	Peter Sagan	Mathias Frank	AG2R La Mondiale
7	Simon Špilak	Simon Špilak	Lasse Norman Hansen	Peter Sagan	Mathias Frank	AG2R La Mondiale
8	Peter Sagan	Simon Špilak	Lasse Norman Hansen	Peter Sagan	Mathias Frank	AG2R La Mondiale
9	Rohan Dennis	Simon Špilak	Lasse Norman Hansen	Peter Sagan	Mathias Frank	AG2R La Mondiale
Final		Simon Špilak	Lasse Norman Hansen	Peter Sagan	Mathias Frank	AG2R La Mondiale
