= Simon Špilak =

Slovenian road bicycle racer

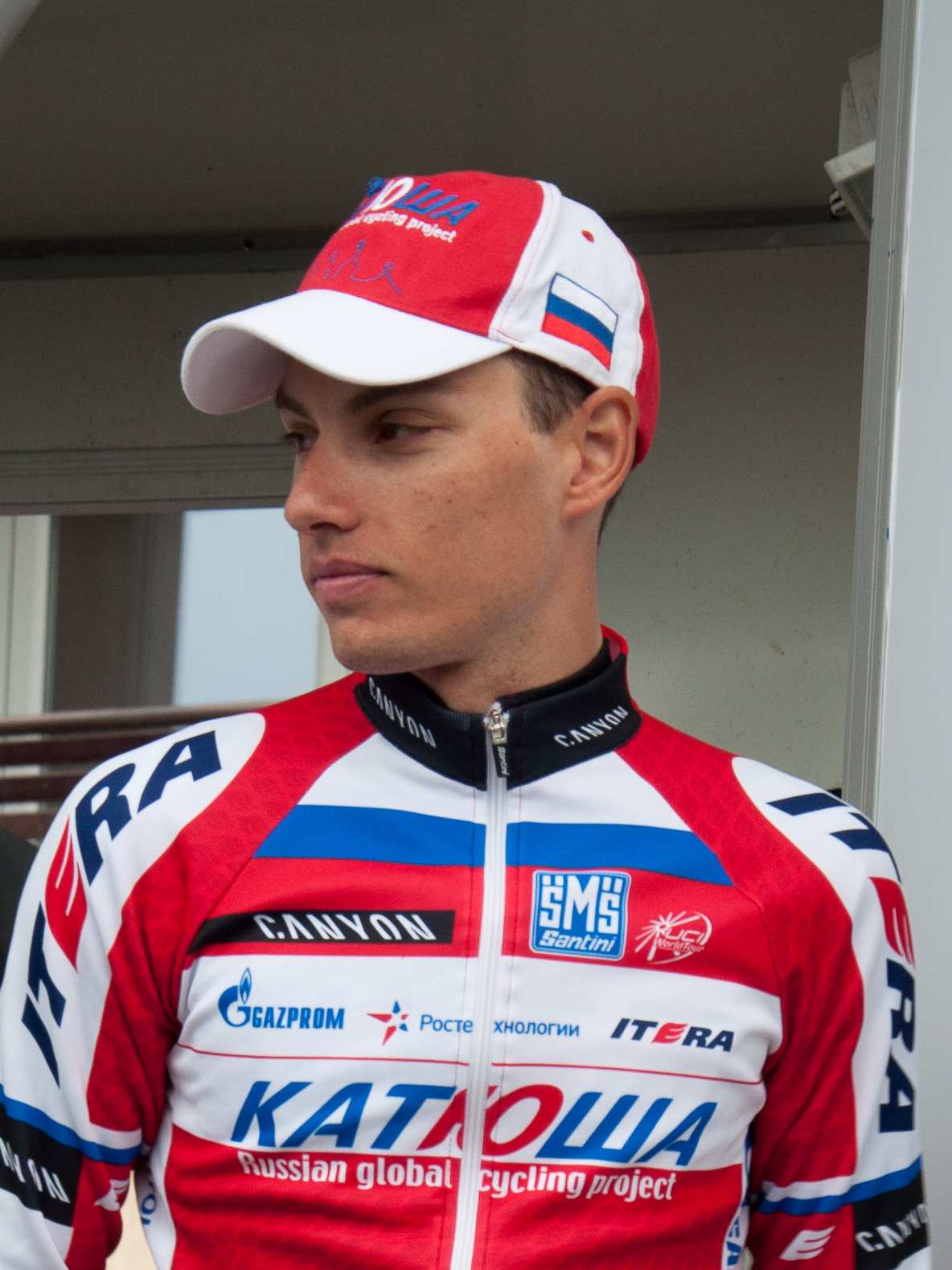
- Špilak at the 2013 Tour de Romandie

Personal information
- Full name: Simon Špilak
- Nickname: Spile
- Born: 23 June 1986 (age 40) Tišina, Slovenia
- Height: 1.76 m (5 ft 9 in)
- Weight: 68 kg (150 lb; 10.7 st)

Cycling career
- Sport: Cycling
- Current team: Retired
- Discipline: Road
- Role: Rider
- Rider type: All-rounder; Short stage race specialist

Professional teams
- 2005–2007: KRKA–Adria Mobil
- 2008–2011: Lampre
- 2012–2019: Team Katusha

Major wins
- Stage races Tour de Suisse (2015, 2017) Tour de Romandie (2010) Single-day races and Classics Eschborn–Frankfurt City Loop (2013)

Simon Špilak (born 23 June 1986) is a retired Slovenian professional road bicycle racer.

== Professional career ==
Born in Tišina, Špilak was the winner of the 2010 Tour de Romandie, after original race winner Alejandro Valverde had his results expunged as part of a doping suspension. Špilak went on to gain second place in that race in 2013 and 2014, both times behind Chris Froome. In 2013, he was the victor of the GP Miguel Induráin and the Eschborn–Frankfurt City Loop, his only two victories of the year. In 2015, he won the general classification of the Tour de Suisse with only five seconds of an advantage over Geraint Thomas. The victory was decided on the last day's time trial. Špilak was considered a rarity in road cycling in that he is a general classification rider who targets one-week races rather than the three-week Grand Tours. In an interview he said that he disliked the heat, so he was always preparing for spring races instead of Grand Tours which took part mostly in summer.

In October 2019, Špilak announced his retirement after his Team Katusha–Alpecin team folded.

== Major results ==
2003
10th Time trial, UCI Junior Road World Championships
2004
National Junior Road Championships

1st Road race
1st Time trial

1st Overall GP Général Patton
3rd Road race, UCI Junior Road World Championships
4th Paris–Roubaix Juniors
2005
1st Road race, National Under-23 Road Championships
7th GP Kranj
9th Road race, UEC European Under-23 Road Championships
2006
1st Poreč Trophy
2nd Time trial, National Under-23 Road Championships
5th Trofeo Zsšdi
7th Time trial, UEC European Under-23 Road Championships
7th Overall Istrian Spring Trophy
2007
1st La Côte Picarde
4th Overall Tour of Slovenia

1st Young rider classification

4th Overall Tour de l'Avenir
5th Overall Istrian Spring Trophy
2008
5th Overall Tour of Slovenia
5th Overall Three Days of De Panne
9th Tour of Flanders
2009 (1 pro win)
1st Stage 3 Tour of Slovenia
6th Overall Giro della Provincia di Grosseto
2010 (2)
1st Overall Tour de Romandie (Note: Retroactively awarded after Alejandro Valverde's results were disqualified following his backdated two-year ban in June 2010.)

1st Young rider classification
1st Stage 4

3rd Overall Bayern–Rundfahrt
2011
5th Overall Tour of Slovenia
5th Giro del Friuli
2012
4th Overall Paris–Nice
8th Overall Tour de Romandie
8th Overall Tour of Belgium
10th Overall Tour of the Basque Country
2013 (3)
1st GP Miguel Induráin
1st Eschborn–Frankfurt City Loop
2nd Overall Tour de Romandie

1st Stage 4

4th Overall Vuelta a Andalucía
4th Overall Tour of the Basque Country
6th Overall Paris–Nice
9th Overall Tour de Suisse
10th Overall Tour du Poitou-Charentes
2014 (3)
1st Stage 5 Critérium du Dauphiné
1st Stage 3 Arctic Race of Norway
2nd Overall Tour de Romandie

1st Stage 3

4th Overall Tour of the Basque Country
8th Overall Paris–Nice
9th Overall Volta ao Algarve
2015 (1)
1st Overall Tour de Suisse
2nd Overall Tour de Romandie
3rd Overall Paris–Nice
2016
7th Overall Tour de Romandie
8th Overall Tour of the Basque Country
9th Overall Tour de Suisse
2017 (2)
1st Overall Tour de Suisse

1st Stage 7

2nd Pro Ötztaler 5500
10th Overall Tour of the Basque Country
2018
6th Overall Tour de Suisse
9th GP Miguel Induráin
2019
5th Trofeo Serra de Tramuntana
6th Overall Tour de Suisse
6th Overall Tour of California
9th Overall Tour de Romandie
10th Overall Volta ao Algarve

=== Grand Tour general classification results timeline ===
Grand Tour general classification results
| Grand Tour | 2008 | 2009 | 2010 | 2011 | 2012 | 2013 | 2014 | 2015 | 2016 | 2017 | 2018 | 2019 |
| Giro d'Italia | 48 | — | — | 117 | — | — | — | — | — | — | — | — |
| Tour de France | — | 109 | DNF | — | — | — | DNF | — | — | — | — | — |
| Vuelta a España | Did not contest during his career | | | | | | | | | | | |
Major stage race general classification results
| Major stage race | 2008 | 2009 | 2010 | 2011 | 2012 | 2013 | 2014 | 2015 | 2016 | 2017 | 2018 | 2019 |
| Paris–Nice | 12 | DNF | — | 13 | 4 | 6 | 8 | 3 | 31 | — | — | 59 |
| Tirreno–Adriatico | — | — | 18 | — | — | — | — | — | — | 11 | 27 | — |
| Volta a Catalunya | — | — | — | — | — | 34 | — | — | — | — | — | DNF |
| Tour of the Basque Country | — | — | — | — | 10 | 4 | 4 | 12 | 8 | 10 | 48 | — |
| Tour de Romandie | — | — | 1 | 21 | 8 | 2 | 2 | 2 | 7 | 30 | 30 | 9 |
| Critérium du Dauphiné | — | 77 | — | — | — | — | 85 | — | — | — | — | — |
| Tour de Suisse | — | — | DNF | — | DNF | 9 | — | 1 | 9 | 1 | 6 | 6 |

Legend
| — | Did not compete |
| DNF | Did not finish |
