= Richie Porte =

Australian racing cyclist (born 1985)

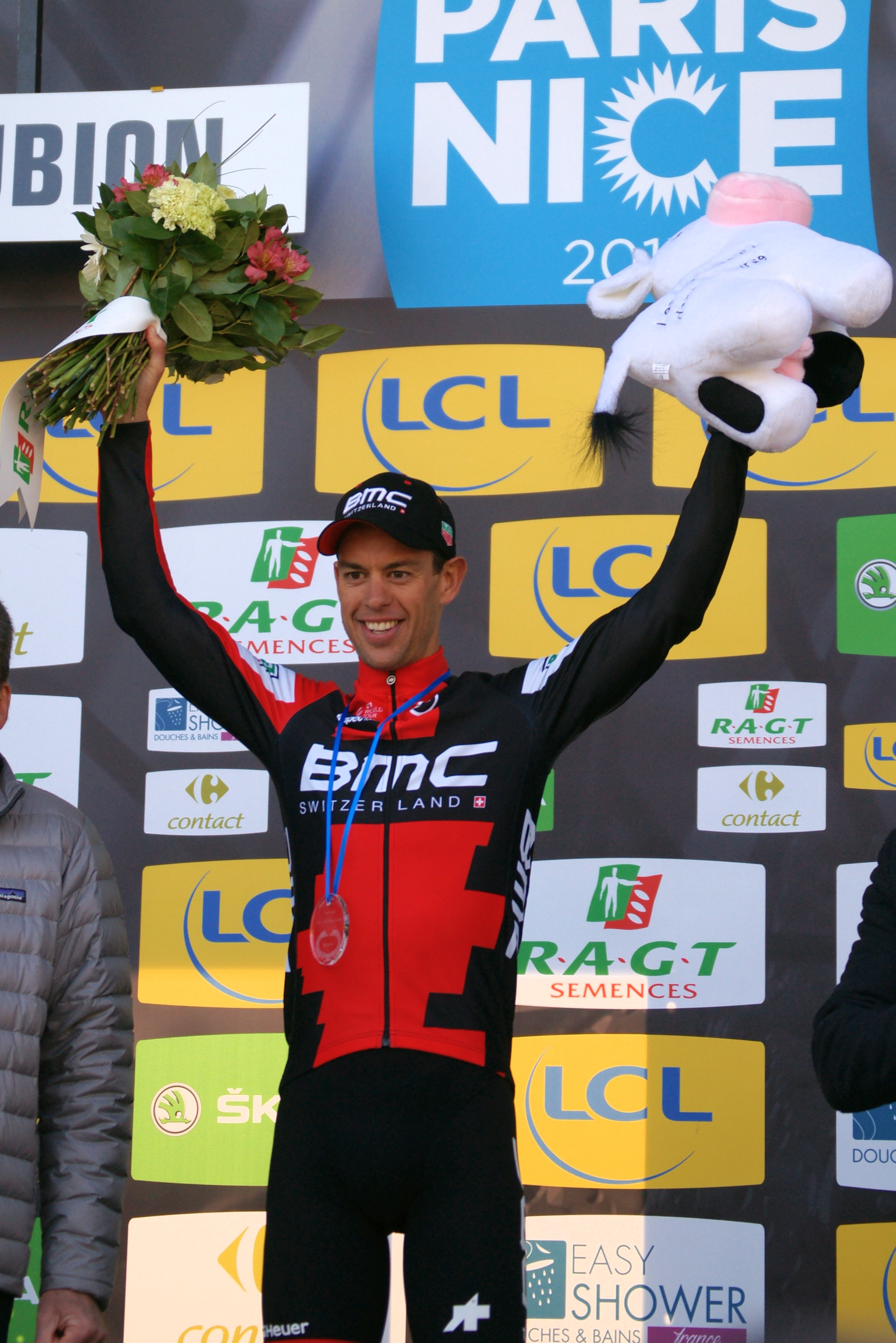
- Porte at the 2017 Paris–Nice

Personal information
- Full name: Richard Julian Porte
- Nicknames: Tasmanian Devil; Fish; The King of Willunga Hill
- Born: 30 January 1985 (age 41) Launceston, Tasmania, Australia
- Height: 1.72 m (5 ft 7 1/2 in)
- Weight: 62 kg (137 lb; 9 st 11 lb)

Cycling career
- Sport: Cycling
- Discipline: Road
- Role: Rider
- Rider type: All-rounder

Amateur teams
- 2007: AC Sammarinese–Gruppo Lupi
- 2008: Mastromarco Sensi Grassi
- 2009: Bedogni–Grassi–Natalini

Professional teams
- 2008–2009: Praties
- 2010–2011: Team Saxo Bank
- 2012–2015: Team Sky
- 2016–2018: BMC Racing Team
- 2019–2020: Trek–Segafredo
- 2021–2022: INEOS Grenadiers

Major wins
- Grand Tours Tour de France 1 TTT stage (2018) Giro d'Italia Young rider classification (2010) Stage races Paris–Nice (2013, 2015) Volta a Catalunya (2015) Tour de Romandie (2017) Tour de Suisse (2018) Critérium du Dauphiné (2021) Tour Down Under (2017, 2020) Giro del Trentino (2015) Volta ao Algarve (2012) Single-day races and Classics National Time Trial Championships (2015)
Medal record
Men's road bicycle racing
Representing Team Sky
World Championships
Bronze medal – third place	2013 Tuscany	Team time trial

Richard Julian Porte (born 30 January 1985) is an Australian former professional road cyclist who competed as a professional from 2008 to 2022. His successes include wins at 8 World Tour stage races: Paris–Nice in 2013 and 2015, the Volta a Catalunya in 2015, the Tour de Romandie in 2017, the Tour Down Under in 2017 and 2020, the Tour de Suisse in 2018 and the Critérium du Dauphiné in 2021. In Grand Tours, he won the young rider classification at the 2010 Giro d'Italia, his first year at UCI ProTour level, and finished on the podium of the 2020 Tour de France, but was also frequently hit by illnesses and injuries.

== Personal life ==
Porte was born in Launceston, Tasmania in 1985. He was educated at St Patrick's College, Launceston. A sports award at their Croagh Patrick campus is named in his honour and awarded to the best athlete in Year 9 annually. When he rides it is not uncommon to see Porte wear a necklace of Tasmania, a homage to his home state. After spending many years living in Europe, in 2023 Porte returned to live in Tasmania after his retirement from professional cycling.

== Career ==
=== Early years, Team UniSA–Australia & Praties ===
Porte started dedicated cycling in 2006 when he was 21 years of age. He comes from a triathlon background, having competed in the sport since 2003. Prior to that he was a competitive swimmer. Porte rode for UniSA–Australia at the 2008 Tour Down Under and finished ninth overall. He raced with a Tasmanian UCI Continental team, Praties, in 2008 and 2009, taking fifth place in the 2008 Herald Sun Tour and winning the Tours of Perth and Tasmania. Porte rose and under the eye of Andrea Tafi on the Monsummanese Grassi Mapei amateur Italian team in 2009, finishing tenth at the 2009 Tour de Langkawi. His performance at the 2009 Baby Giro, where he won the individual time trial, brought him to the attention of the professional teams.

=== 2010: Team Saxo Bank and individual success ===
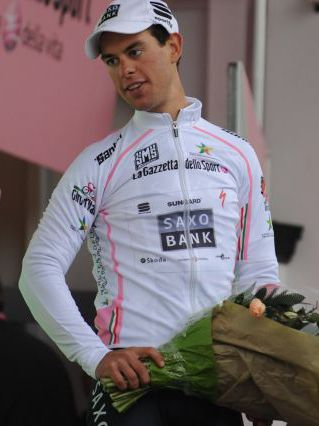
Porte, in the white jersey of young rider classification leader, at the 2010 Giro d'Italia

At the end of the 2009 season, he signed a two-year contract with Team Saxo Bank. His coach at Team Saxo Bank was compatriot Bradley McGee. In April, Porte went on to win the stage 4 time trial at the Tour de Romandie, finishing in tenth place overall. In May he made his Grand Tour debut in the Giro d'Italia where he finished seventh overall and won the young rider classification, by a margin of 7' 29" over Robert Kišerlovski, cementing his place as a rider for the future. He also led the race during stages 11 to 13 and thus wore the pink jersey. In July Porte placed tenth in the Clásica de San Sebastián and had a further run of strong performances; second in the stage 5 time trial of the Post Danmark Rundt, fourth overall at the Eneco Tour and fourth overall at the Tour of Britain. Porte narrowly missed out on the bronze medal in the time trial at the UCI Road World Championships, held in the Australian city of Geelong; he finished in fourth place, six and a half seconds down on third-place finisher, Germany's Tony Martin.

=== 2011: Time trial successes ===
Although the 2011 season brought less individual success for Porte, through the expectation that he would become a key domestique for Alberto Contador in his overall victory in the Giro d'Italia, Porte continued his strong time trial performances; placing third in Paris–Nice and eighth at the Tour of the Basque Country. Porte then won the fourth stage at Vuelta a Castilla y León by virtue of Contador's disqualification. Porte then placed third in the final stage time trial at the Giro d'Italia, and fourth in the final stage time trial at the Tour de France. Porte then went on to win fifth stage time trial at the Post Danmark Rundt, in Helsingør, by a margin of 10 seconds over teammate, Gustav Larsson. Porte then finished his season with sixth position in the time trial at the UCI Road World Championships.

=== 2012: Move to Team Sky ===
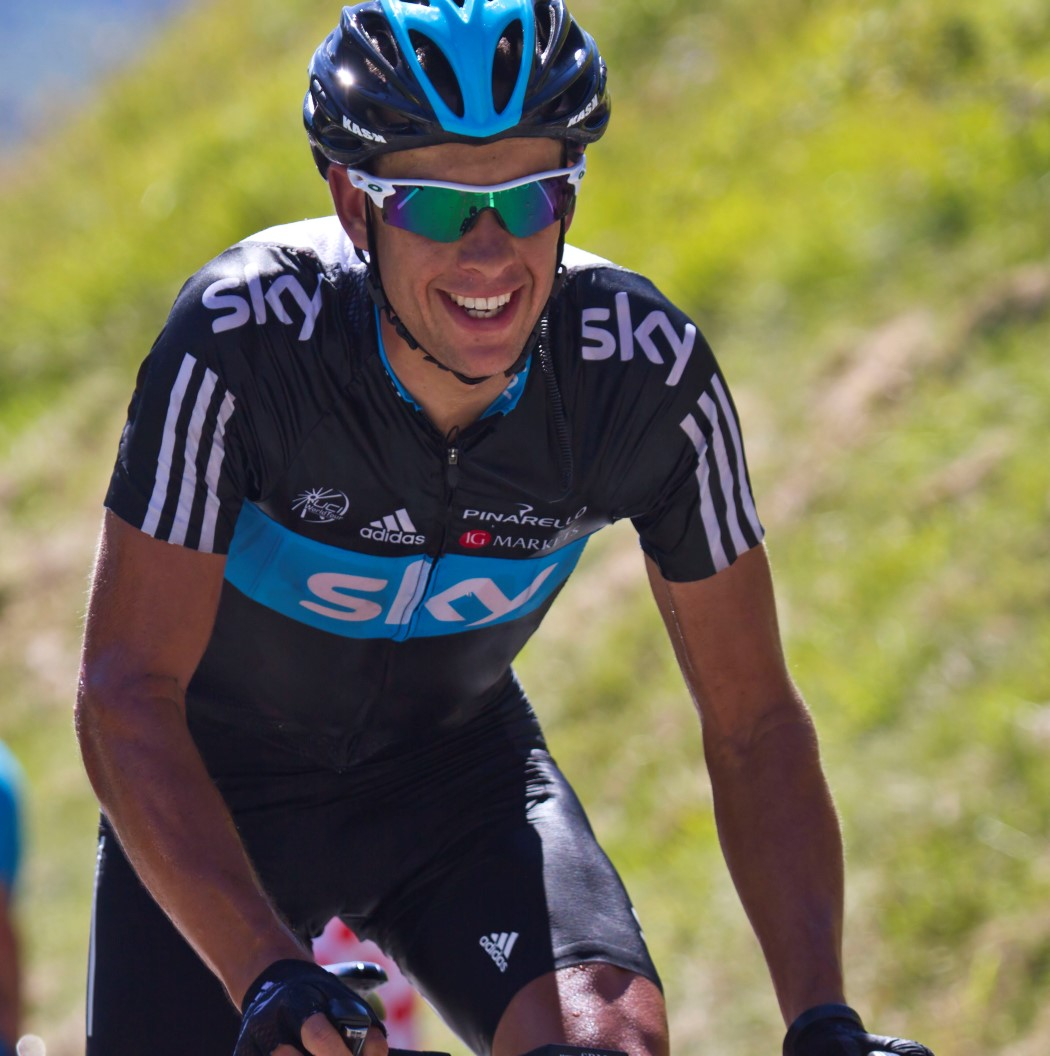
Porte at the 2012 Tour de France

Porte joined Team Sky ahead of the 2012 season. In January 2012, he competed in his national championships in Buninyong and Learmonth, where he finished third in the road race, and placed fifth in the time trial several days later. In February 2012, Porte took the lead of the Volta ao Algarve after winning the race's queen stage, the summit finish at the Alto do Malhão in Loulé. He held the lead until the end of the race, eventually finishing 37 seconds clear of defending race winner, Tony Martin. Porte then worked for Bradley Wiggins in Paris–Nice, helping his leader win the race overall. Porte was a key member of the Sky teams that helped Wiggins go on to win the Tour de Romandie, the Critérium du Dauphiné and the Tour de France. Porte then rode the Vuelta a España in support of Chris Froome, and took second place on stage 20.

=== 2013: Paris–Nice and super-domestique ===
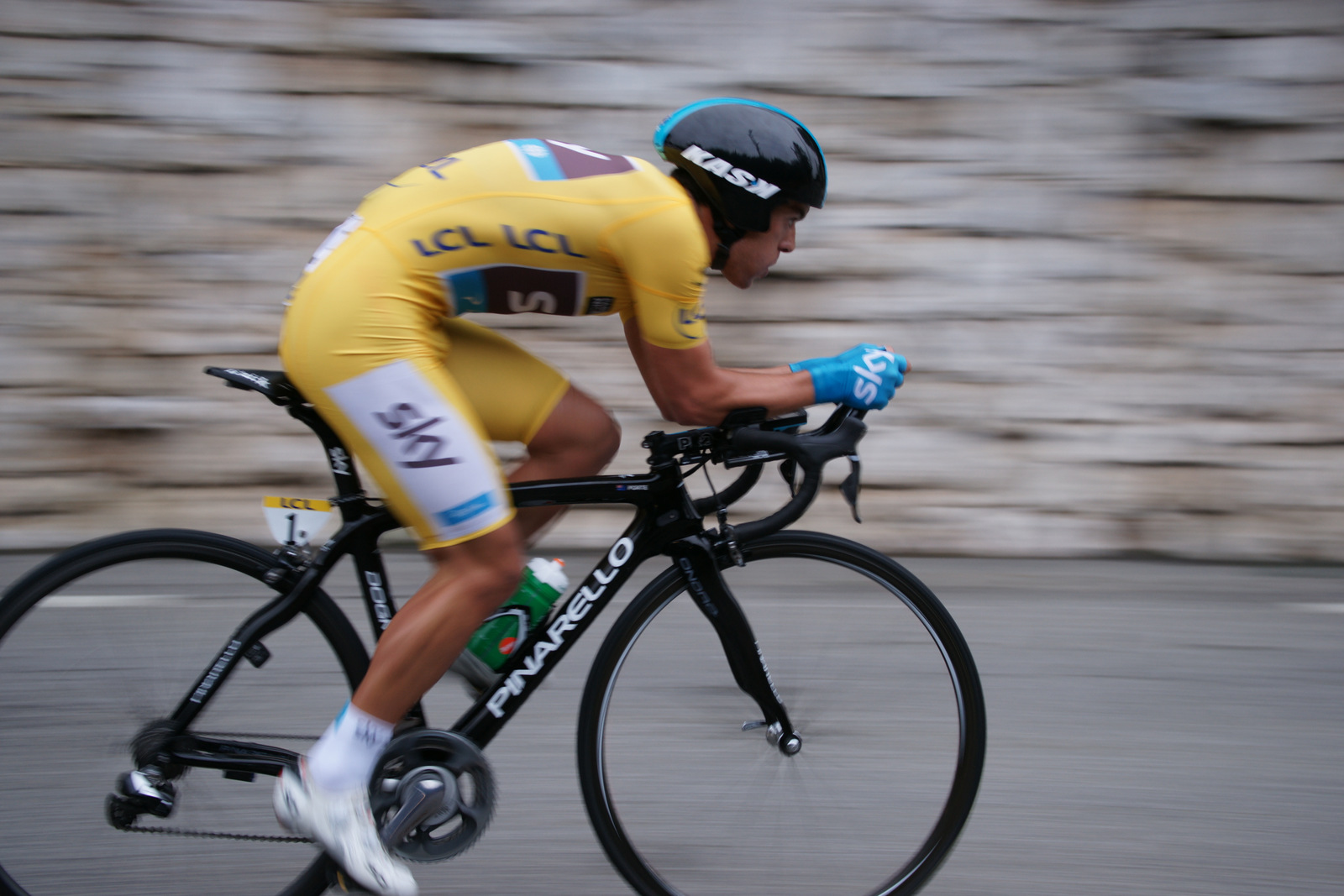
Porte, in the leader's jersey, on his way to winning stage seven's individual time trial of the 2013 Paris–Nice.

In the absence of Wiggins and Froome, Porte was selected to lead Team Sky at Paris–Nice. He won the fifth stage of the race – the queen stage – with an attack on La Montagne de Lure to take the lead of the race, from Garmin–Sharp's Andrew Talansky. Porte also won the final time trial on the Col d'Èze by 23 seconds over Talansky to seal overall victory by 55 seconds. Porte's time was only four seconds short of the course record, set by Wiggins the previous year.

Porte's good form continued into the Critérium International, winning the second stage's time trial. A second-place finish on the final mountain stage was not enough to prevent stage winner and teammate Chris Froome from winning the general classification, but did secure Porte the points classification, and second place overall.

Porte was again given the lead of Team Sky for the Tour of the Basque Country. Porte powered away in the final kilometres of stage five from a small group of elite riders, including race leader and teammate Sergio Henao, to claim the stage. In the sixth and final stage, an individual time trial, Porte could not match Nairo Quintana over the undulating parcours, but managed to rise to second place in the general classification, ahead of Henao. Porte returned to a supporting role for Chris Froome at the Tour de Romandie. He helped Froome win the race and placed eighth overall himself in the process. Porte and Froome next featured at the Critérium du Dauphiné at the beginning of June. Porte sat fifth overall after the time trial on stage four, and on the following stage helped Froome take the race lead by setting a strong tempo to drop Rohan Dennis, before Froome attacked to win the stage. Porte in the process moved up to second overall, 52 seconds behind his leader. Froome allowed Porte to attack on stage seven, although he only managed to take one second out of the other contenders. On the concluding stage eight, Froome and Porte rode clear of their rivals on the final climb, with only Andrew Talansky able to follow, to secure a one-two finish in the overall standings.

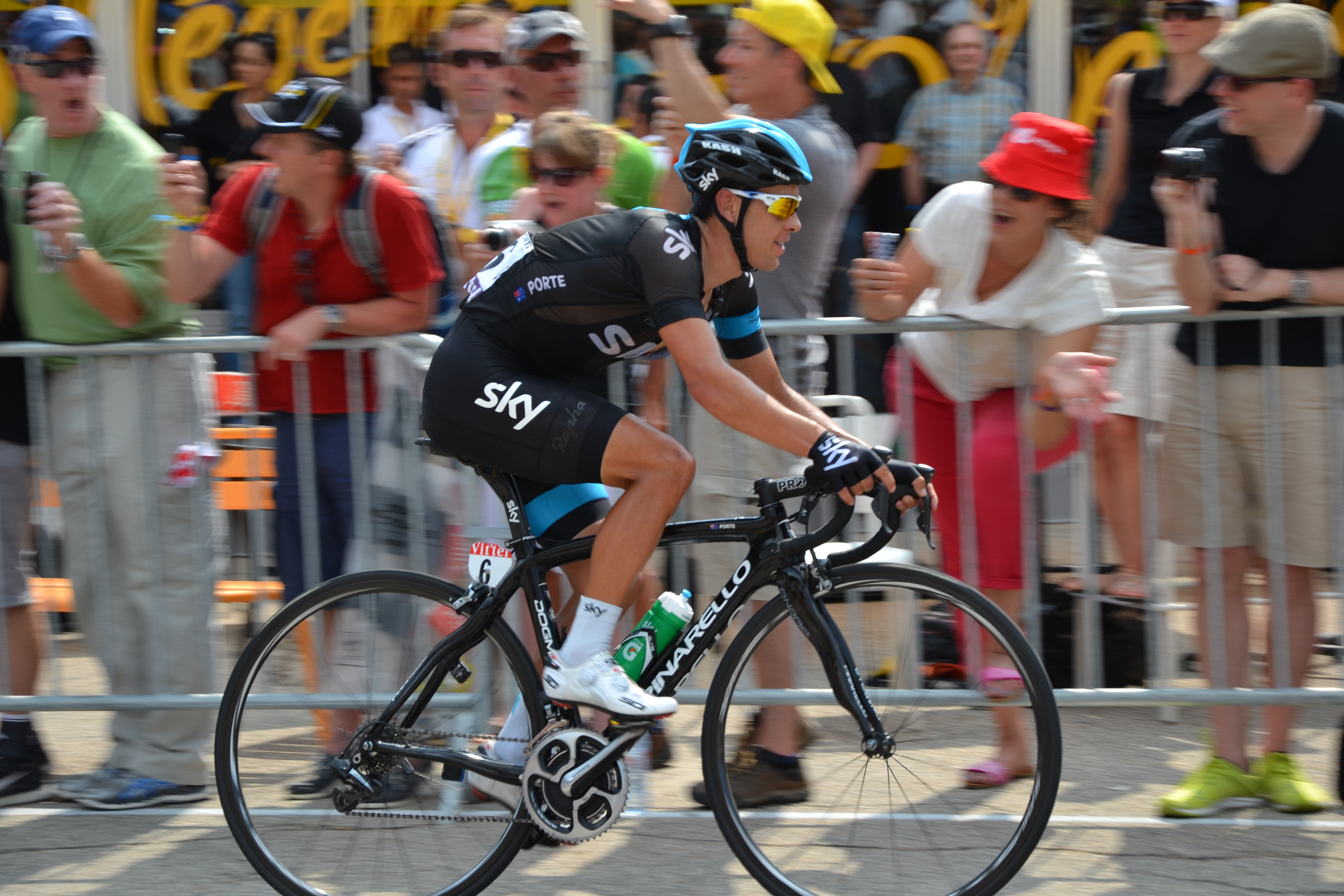
Porte at the 2013 Tour de France

Porte entered the Tour de France as super-domestique for Froome. On stage eight – the first mountain stage – Peter Kennaugh and then Porte dropped most of the overall contenders and brought back an earlier attack by Nairo Quintana on the final climb before Froome attacked to take the stage win and overall lead. Porte was able to finish second on the stage, 51 seconds behind Froome, to rise to second overall. However, in the following stage Porte cracked following numerous early attacks by Movistar Team, Garmin–Sharp and Saxo–Tinkoff riders, leaving Froome completely isolated for most of the stage. Porte lost over ten minutes and dropped out of overall contention, although Froome managed to avoid time loss by fending off several attacks from Alejandro Valverde and Quintana. On stage 15, Porte again provided the launch pad for Froome's victory on Mont Ventoux. On stage 18 – which finished at Alpe d'Huez – Porte's assistance proved vital for Froome, as Froome ran into difficulty towards the end of the stage; Porte dropped back to the team car to illegally get energy gels for his leader, then paced him to the end of the climb to limit his losses to Quintana and Joaquim Rodríguez. Porte and Froome each received a 20-second time penalty and a fine of 200 Swiss francs for the infringement. Froome went on to comfortably win the Tour by four minutes, 20 seconds over Quintana with Porte finishing 19th overall.

=== 2014: A season wrecked by illness ===
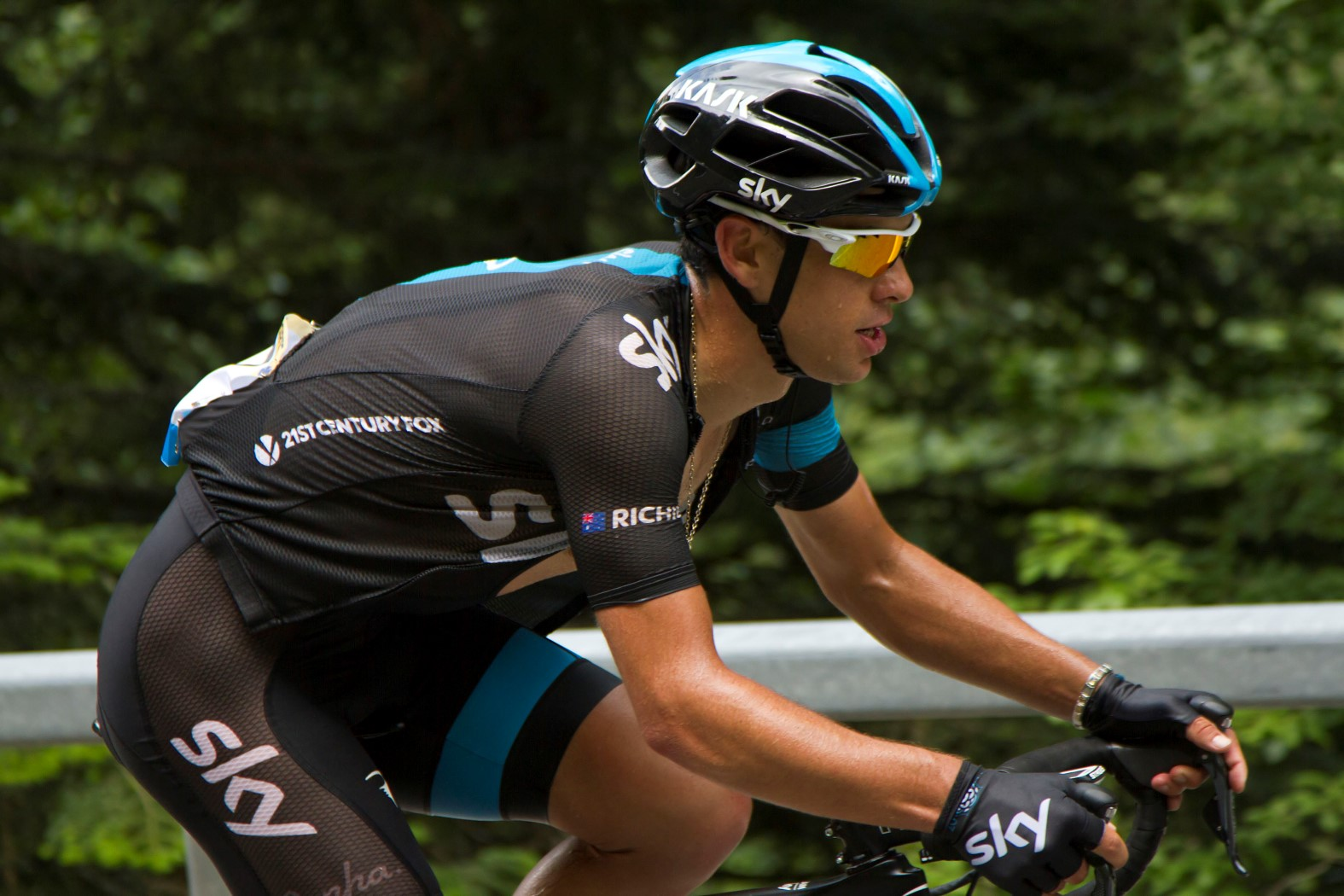
Porte at the 2014 Tour de France

After finishing third behind Simon Gerrans and Cadel Evans in the national road race championships, Porte began his 2014 season at his home race, the Tour Down Under. He won the penultimate fifth stage, finishing on Old Willunga Hill, and finished fourth in the general classification on the final stage. Porte then followed up his result in the Tour Down Under with second overall at the Vuelta a Andalucía. Porte's season then took a downwards turn finishing 22nd overall at the Critérium du Dauphiné. Porte then failed to start at Tirreno–Adriatico and failed to finish at; Tour de Romandie, Liège–Bastogne–Liège, Volta a Catalunya, culminating in him taking leadership of Team Sky due to Chris Froome's abandonment and then finishing 23rd at the Tour de France. Porte then failed to finish the Vattenfall Cyclassics as well as GP Ouest–France which led him to end his season early after being diagnosed with pneumonia.

Just before the Tour de France, Porte revealed that he had beaten teammate Chris Froome's time on the famous Col de la Madone climb near to Monte Carlo. Porte completed the climb in 29 minutes 40 seconds, besting Froome's time by 29 seconds.

=== 2015: Final season at Sky – Early season success ===
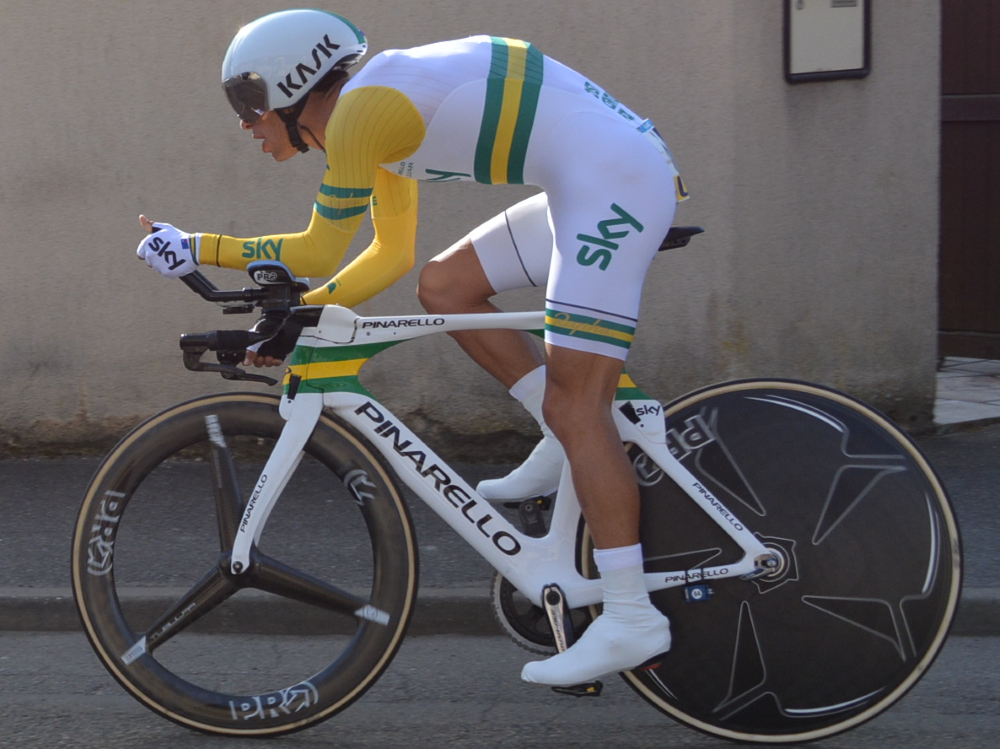
Porte in his national time trial champion's jersey at the 2015 Paris–Nice

Porte started the 2015 season with success, taking victory in the Australian National Time Trial Championships. Much like the previous season, Porte took victory on the queen stage of the Tour Down Under at Old Willunga Hill resulting in a second place on the overall general classification. Porte then returned to Europe at the Volta ao Algarve again taking victory on the queen stage to the summit finish of Malhão, this stage win succeeded in elevating Porte to fourth overall on general classification behind teammate Geraint Thomas, as well as taking the win in the mountains classification. Porte's next victory came at Paris–Nice where he and teammate Thomas took a one-two victory on the summit finish of Croix de Chaubouret. Despite losing the chance to take the overall lead after a crash on the penultimate stage of the race, a victory in the final-day time trial (again on the Col d'Èze), by a margin of 13 seconds to his closest rival, gave him his second overall victory in the race in the past three seasons. Furthermore, this pushed him to the top of the UCI Road World Rankings.

Porte's next victory came in late March when he secured the overall win at the Volta a Catalunya. Despite not winning a stage, Porte won the race by a margin of four seconds from Alejandro Valverde, after achieving two top-5 stage placings on the decisive finishes of La Molina and Valls. In late April Porte notched up his third overall win of the season, taking the Giro d'Italia warm-up Giro del Trentino four-day stage race. Porte took a decisive stage victory on the Queen stage summit finish to Brentonico giving him a margin of 24 seconds to his closest rival, Mikel Landa. Porte would carry the majority of this gap to the finish in Cles. In doing so he became the first ever rider to win the Paris–Nice, Volta a Catalunya and Giro del Trentino treble in one season.

In the Giro d'Italia, Porte made headlines by having a motor-home to sleep in as he was the team leader while his teammates slept in hotels. He was competitive during the first week of the race, and sat third overall after stage nine. However, on Stage 10 Porte punctured 5 km from the finish, and accepted a change of wheels from Simon Clarke from the Orica–GreenEDGE team. Porte initially lost 47 seconds to the peloton, but was then docked two minutes and fined 200 Swiss francs for accepting Clarke's wheel as this manoeuvre is illegal according to UCI rules, dropping him to 12th place overall. On stage 13, Porte was involved in a crash 3.3 kilometres (2.1 miles) from the stage finish, and lost a further two minutes. Porte suffered a bad individual time trial on stage 14 and an even worse stage 15, where he lost 27 minutes to then-leader Alberto Contador. After that debacle, he gave the leadership of the team to Leopold König. After the aforementioned stage, he announced he was abandoning the race due to a leg injury.

After the Giro, Porte was included in Sky's squad for the Tour de France as a key domestique for Chris Froome. He played a key role in Froome's overall victory in that race, especially during the first mountain stage 10, where Porte not only made the final pull that allowed Froome to launch his decisive attack, but recovered to overtake the chasing Nairo Quintana and arrive second behind Froome, increasing the latter's lead over Quintana due to bonus seconds. During the final mountain stage 20, with Froome seemingly running out of steam on the long uphill finish and Nairo Quintana aggressively attacking in front, Porte was the last Sky rider to steadily pull and pace Froome up the climb, allowing him to limit his losses and secure the overall lead and yellow jersey, to gain his second Tour de France victory. During the Tour Porte confirmed that he would be leaving the team at the end of the year, with the aim of becoming a team leader elsewhere. This would later, in August, be confirmed to be BMC Racing Team.

=== 2016–2018: BMC Racing Team ===
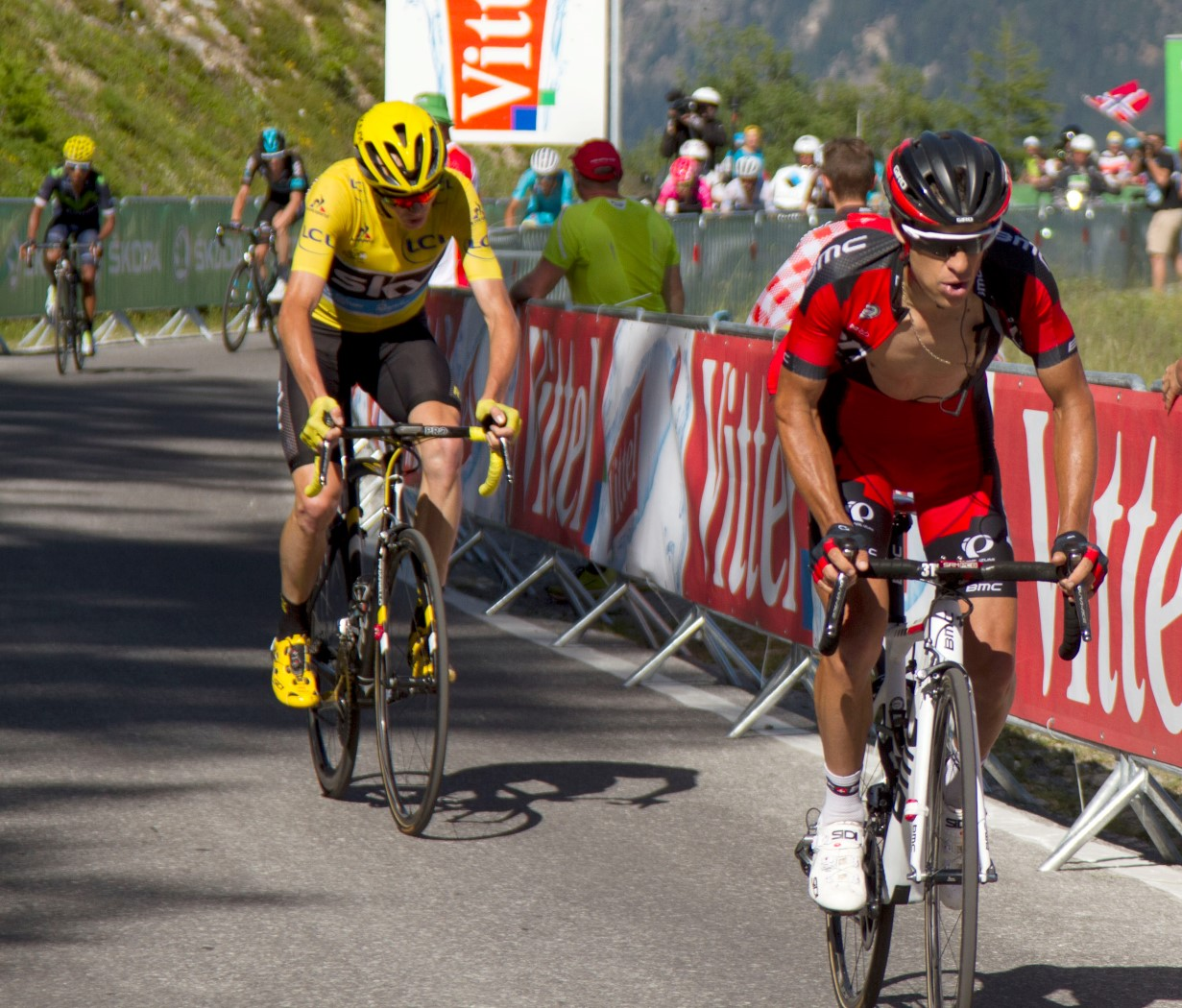
Porte at the 2016 Tour de France, attacking former teammate Chris Froome

Ahead of the 2016 season Porte highlighted the Tour de France and the Olympic road race and time trial as his targets for the year. He started his season strongly in Australia, finishing second to new teammate Rohan Dennis in the Australian National Time Trial Championships before going to the Tour Down Under, where he took his first victory in BMC colours by winning stage 5 to Willunga Hill for the third year in a row and finished second overall. He subsequently struggled in the Tour of Oman in February, losing over three minutes to the leaders on each of the first two stages, before bouncing back upon returning to Europe, taking third place in the general classification at Paris–Nice after attacking the last stage's final climb alongside Alberto Contador followed by an overall fourth place in the Volta a Catalunya. Following his third place at Paris-Nice, Porte spent one week ranked number 1 in the UCI road racing world ranking, during the period in which the new rankings system was forming. Porte targeted the Tour de France, but lost time early on with a mechanical problem on stage 2. Along with Bauke Mollema and Froome he was leading an attack up Mont Ventoux which involved all three riders being taken down when a motorcycle suddenly stopped in front of them disrupting the performance of all three riders and causing the ensuing chaos which involved Chris Froome running up Mont Ventoux. He rallied to perform well in the mountains and individual time trials, finishing fifth overall, his highest Grand Tour placing to that point.

In the 2017 season, Porte finished 12th in the World Tour individual classification, having won the Tour Down Under; he won the queen stage of the race, at Old Willunga Hill for the fourth successive season. Porte also won the Tour de Romandie and finished 2nd in the Critérium du Dauphiné. He crashed out of the Tour de France on stage 9 while descending the Mont du Chat; he had been in an excellent position going into the high mountains being within about 30 seconds of the lead with only Dan Martin, Froome and Fabio Aru ahead of him.

In the 2018 season, Porte won the Tour de Suisse, finished second at the Tour Down Under, and third at the Tour de Romandie. Again he crashed out of the Tour de France on stage 9, this time suffering a collarbone injury. Once again he was in good position prior to the high mountains being within a minute of Super-Domestique and eventual winner Geraint Thomas and overall leader Greg Van Avermaet. He was also ahead of most other favorites including Romain Bardet, Mikel Landa, Tom Dumoulin, Froome and Nairo Quintana.

=== 2019–2020: Trek–Segafredo ===
For the 2019 season, Porte moved to the Trek–Segafredo team. He won the queen stage at the Tour Down Under, winning at Old Willunga Hill for the sixth successive year. During the Tour de France he was in tenth place overall when the race was shortened due to landslides and dangerous weather. He finished the race in eleventh overall, nearly thirteen minutes behind race winner Egan Bernal.

He began the 2020 season by taking the lead midway through the Tour Down Under, but then Daryl Impey took a two-second advantage going into the final stage on Old Willunga Hill. Porte did not win the stage – finishing second behind Matthew Holmes – however he gained enough time over Impey and the other overall contenders to win the race for the second time in his career, after his victory in 2017. During the Tour de France, Porte found himself in a top-ten position early in the race, and by the end of the second week he was in ninth place overall. He moved up to sixth in the general classification, after he finished third on stage fifteen, behind Tadej Pogačar and Primož Roglič. Porte moved into fourth overall following stage 17, a summit finish at the Col de la Loze, and was 1' 39" behind a podium placing going into the penultimate day's stage, a 36.2-kilometre (22.5-mile) individual time trial that finished at La Planche des Belles Filles. Porte recorded the third-fastest time for the stage – only beaten by Pogačar and Tom Dumoulin – and by outpacing Miguel Ángel López by nearly five minutes, he moved into third place overall. He ultimately finished the race in that position, recording his first Grand Tour podium finish and the first by an Australian rider at the race since Cadel Evans' 2011 Tour de France win.

Porte was awarded the Sir Hubert Opperman Medal for AusCycling's Cyclist of the Year for 2020.

=== 2021–2022: Ineos Grenadiers ===
In September 2020, it was announced Porte would leave Trek–Segafredo, and he signed a two-year contract with INEOS Grenadiers from 2021 onwards.

On his first start of the 2021 season, Porte withdrew from Paris–Nice on the opening stage, after a crash caused by a discarded water bottle. He returned to racing with second-place overall finishes at the Volta a Catalunya and the Tour de Romandie. He then won the Critérium du Dauphiné ahead of teammate Geraint Thomas and Alexey Lutsenko. He appeared to be in good form heading into the Tour de France; however, he lost over two minutes on the opening stage, marked by several crashes. He crashed on stage 9, losing further time. He ultimately finished 38th overall, while assisting Richard Carapaz in the mountains to a third-place overall finish. After the race, he stated that it was his final Tour de France appearance.

In 2022, Porte recorded top-ten overall finishes at March's Tirreno–Adriatico (fourth), and April's Tour of the Alps (seventh), with his final race start coming at the Tour of Britain in September.

== Major results ==
2007
1st Overall Tour of Bright

1st Stages 1 & 2

2008
1st Overall Tour de Perth

1st Stages 2 & 3

1st Overall Tour of Tasmania

1st Stages 7 & 9

1st Stage 2 Tour of Wellington
5th Overall Herald Sun Tour
9th Overall Tour Down Under
2009
1st GP Citta di Felino
1st Stage 2 Giro del Friuli-Venezia Giulia
1st Stage 4 (ITT) Girobio
3rd Time trial, National Road Championships
3rd Coppa della Pace
4th Giro Valli Aretine
10th Overall Tour de Langkawi
2010
4th Time trial, UCI Road World Championships
4th Overall Tour of Britain
4th Overall Eneco Tour
7th Overall Giro d'Italia

1st Young rider classification
Held after Stages 11–13

10th Overall Tour de Romandie

1st Stage 3 (ITT)

10th Clásica de San Sebastián
2011
1st Stage 4 (ITT) Vuelta a Castilla y León
1st Stage 5 (ITT) Post Danmark Rundt
6th Time trial, UCI Road World Championships
2012
1st Overall Volta ao Algarve

1st Stage 3

3rd Road race, National Road Championships
4th Overall Tour de Romandie
4th Overall Bayern Rundfahrt
9th Overall Critérium du Dauphiné
2013
1st Overall Paris–Nice

1st Stages 5 & 7 (ITT)

2nd Overall Critérium International

1st Points classification
1st Stage 2 (ITT)

2nd Overall Tour of the Basque Country

1st Stage 5

2nd Overall Critérium du Dauphiné
3rd Team time trial, UCI Road World Championships
8th Overall Tour de Romandie
10th UCI World Tour
2014
2nd Overall Vuelta a Andalucía
3rd Road race, National Road Championships
4th Overall Tour Down Under

1st Stage 5

2015
1st Time trial, National Road Championships
1st Overall Paris–Nice

1st Stages 4 & 7 (ITT)

1st Overall Volta a Catalunya
1st Overall Giro del Trentino

1st Stage 2

2nd Overall Tour Down Under

1st Stage 5

4th Overall Volta ao Algarve

1st Mountains classification
1st Stage 4

2016
2nd Time trial, National Road Championships
2nd Overall Tour Down Under

1st Stage 5

3rd Overall Paris–Nice
4th Overall Volta a Catalunya
4th Overall Critérium du Dauphiné
5th Overall Tour de France
7th UCI World Tour
2017
1st Overall Tour Down Under

1st Stages 2 & 5

1st Overall Tour de Romandie
1st Stage 7 Paris–Nice
2nd Overall Critérium du Dauphiné

1st Stage 4 (ITT)

2018
1st Overall Tour de Suisse

1st Stage 1 (TTT)

1st Stage 3 (TTT) Tour de France
2nd Overall Tour Down Under

1st Stage 5

3rd Time trial, National Road Championships
3rd Overall Tour de Romandie
2019
2nd Overall Tour Down Under

1st Stage 6

5th Overall Tour of California
5th Overall Herald Sun Tour
2020
1st Overall Tour Down Under

1st Stage 3

2nd Mont Ventoux Dénivelé Challenge
3rd Overall Tour de France
3rd Overall Tour des Alpes-Maritimes et du Var
6th Overall Route d'Occitanie
8th La Flèche Wallonne
2021
1st Overall Critérium du Dauphiné
1st Stage 3 (TTT) Tour of Britain
2nd Overall Volta a Catalunya
2nd Overall Tour de Romandie
2022
4th Overall Tirreno–Adriatico
7th Overall Tour of the Alps

=== General classification results timeline ===
Grand Tour general classification results
Grand Tour	2010	2011	2012	2013	2014	2015	2016	2017	2018	2019	2020	2021	2022
Giro d'Italia	7	80	—	—	—	DNF	—	—	—	—	—	—	DNF
Tour de France	—	72	34	19	23	48	5	DNF	DNF	11	3	38	—
Vuelta a España	—	—	68	—	—	—	—	—	84	—	—	—	—
Major stage race general classification results
Race	2010	2011	2012	2013	2014	2015	2016	2017	2018	2019	2020	2021	2022
Paris–Nice	DNF	22	68	1	—	1	3	11	—	—	41	DNF	—
Tirreno–Adriatico	—	—	—	—	DNF	—	—	—	—	—	—	—	4
Volta a Catalunya	—	—	DNF	—	DNF	1	4	—	—	38	NH	2	DNF
Tour of the Basque Country	—	127	—	2	—	—	—	—	DNF	—	NH	—	—
Tour de Romandie	10	121	4	8	DNF	—	DNF	1	3	—	NH	2	—
Critérium du Dauphiné	—	—	9	2	22	—	4	2	—	11	15	1	—
Tour de Suisse	—	—	—	—	—	—	—	—	1	—	NH	—	—

Legend
—	Did not compete
DNF	Did not finish
NH	Not held
IP	In progress
