= 2010 Tour de Romandie =

2010 UCI ProTour, race 6 of 16

Race details
- Dates: 27 April–2 May 2010
- Stages: 5 + Prologue
- Distance: 654.8 km (406.9 mi)

Results
Jersey awarded to the overall winner	Winner	Simon Špilak (SLO)	(Lampre–Farnese Vini)
	Second	Denis Menchov (RUS)	(Rabobank)
	Third	Michael Rogers (AUS)	(Team HTC–Columbia)
Jersey awarded to the points classification winner	Points	Chad Beyer (USA)	(BMC Racing Team)
Jersey awarded to the mountains classification winner	Mountains	Thibaut Pinot (FRA)	(Française des Jeux)
Jersey awarded to the young rider classification winner	Young rider	Simon Špilak (SLO)	(Lampre–Farnese Vini)
	Team	Team RadioShack	

The 2010 Tour de Romandie was the 64th edition of the Tour de Romandie cycling road race and the sixth event of the 2010 UCI ProTour. It started on 27 April in Lausanne and finished on 2 May in Sion. The race winner had been declared as Alejandro Valverde, who won the final stage to take the race by 11 seconds. However, some four weeks after the end of the race, the UCI placed Valverde under a two-year suspension for his involvement in the 2006 Operación Puerto doping case, which was backdated to, and involved removal of all his results since, 1 January 2010. Simon Špilak was thus promoted to the winner of the event.

== Pre-race favourites ==
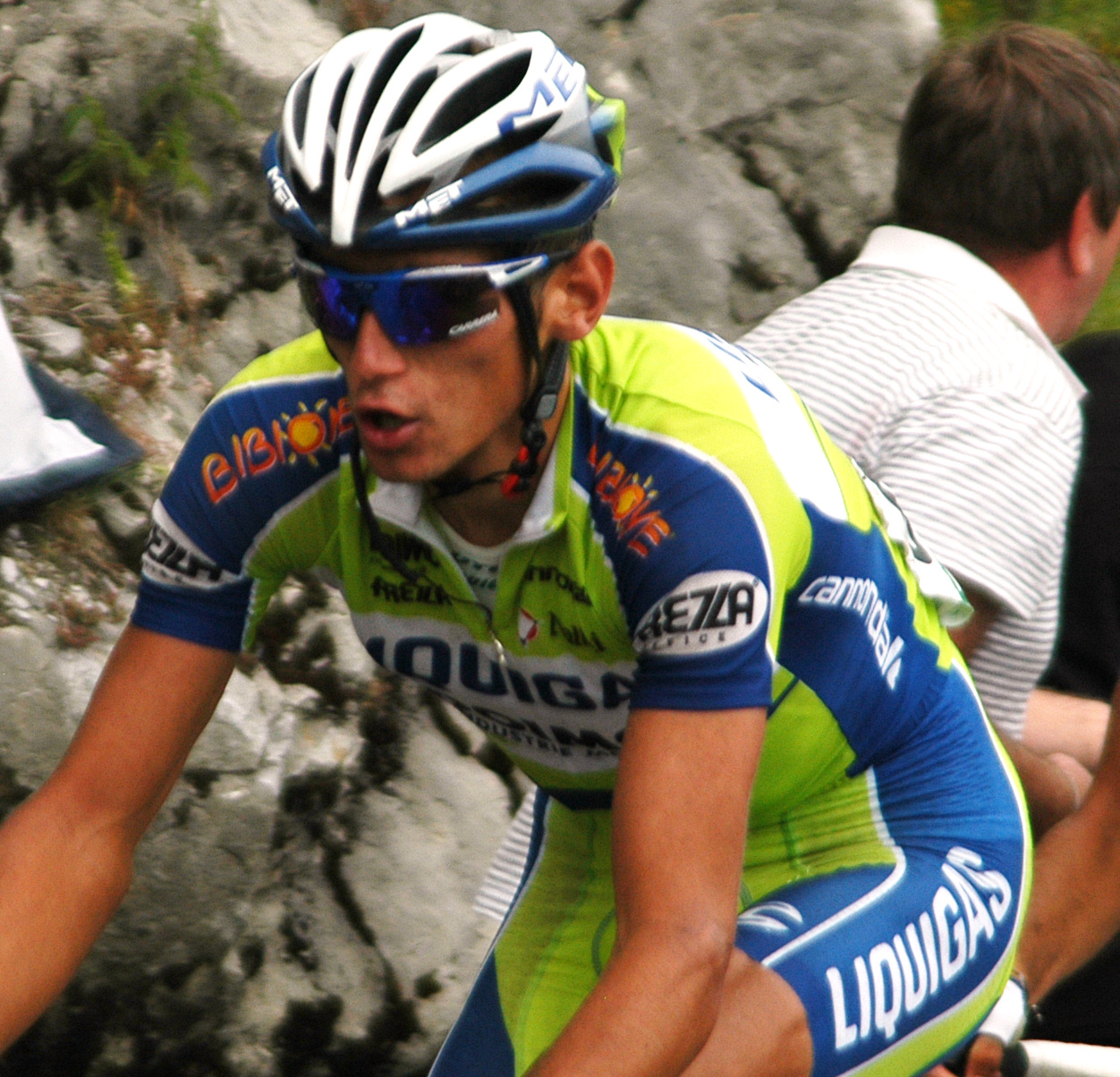
Roman Kreuziger – the defending champion – was considered a heavy favourite.

2010 pre-race favourites included 2009 champion, Roman Kreuziger of Liquigas–Doimo as well as teammate Ivan Basso. Denis Menchov of Russia was also a favourite.

This was local Alexandre Moos's 12th and final Tour de Romandie.

== Teams ==
Twenty teams participated in the race.

- Ag2r–La Mondiale
- Astana
- BMC Racing Team
- Caisse d'Epargne
- Cervélo TestTeam
- Euskaltel–Euskadi
- Footon–Servetto–Fuji
- Française des Jeux
- Garmin–Transitions
- Lampre–Farnese Vini
- Liquigas–Doimo
- Omega Pharma–Lotto
- Quick-Step
- Rabobank
- Team HTC–Columbia
- Team Katusha
- Team Milram
- Team RadioShack
- Team Saxo Bank
- Team Sky

== Stages ==
=== Prologue ===
27 April 2010 – Lausanne to Lausanne, 4.3 kilometres (2.7 mi) (ITT)

This short course took place in the village of Porrentruy and included a 400-metre cobbled section.

Prologue results
Rank	Rider	Team	Time
1	Marco Pinotti (ITA)	Team HTC–Columbia	5' 17"
2	Peter Sagan (SVK)	Liquigas–Doimo	+ 1"
3	Jérémy Roy (FRA)	Française des Jeux	+ 3"
4	Michael Rogers (AUS)	Team HTC–Columbia	+ 3"
5	Rick Flens (NED)	Rabobank	+ 4"
6	Christophe Moreau (FRA)	Caisse d'Epargne	+ 5"
7	Greg Henderson (NZL)	Team Sky	+ 6"
8	Roman Kreuziger (CZE)	Liquigas–Doimo	+ 6"
9	Rubén Plaza (SPA)	Caisse d'Epargne	+ 6"
10	Haimar Zubeldia (SPA)	Team RadioShack	+ 6"

General classification after Prologue
Rank	Rider	Team	Time
1	Marco Pinotti (ITA)	Team HTC–Columbia	5' 17"
2	Peter Sagan (SVK)	Liquigas–Doimo	+ 1"
3	Jérémy Roy (FRA)	Française des Jeux	+ 3"
4	Michael Rogers (AUS)	Team HTC–Columbia	+ 3"
5	Rick Flens (NED)	Rabobank	+ 4"
6	Christophe Moreau (FRA)	Caisse d'Epargne	+ 5"
7	Greg Henderson (NZL)	Team Sky	+ 6"
8	Roman Kreuziger (CZE)	Liquigas–Doimo	+ 6"
9	Rubén Plaza (SPA)	Caisse d'Epargne	+ 6"
10	Haimar Zubeldia (SPA)	Team RadioShack	+ 6"

=== Stage 1 ===
28 April 2010 – Porrentruy to Fleurier, 175.6 kilometres (109.1 mi)

A hilly stage in the Jura mountains north of Lake Neuchatel. Two category 1 climbs and a category 2 – and a few other bumps along the way. Although the last 10 km are downhill, the course may be well suited to a break-away.

Peter Sagan – the up-and-coming young cyclist claimed the victory in the sprint. It was his third victory of the season. The win put him in first place overall as he was just 0.92 seconds behind the previous leader, Marco Pinotti. Sagan was pleased with the win, but pledged his loyalty to Liquigas–Doimo team leader Roman Kreuziger. According to Cycling News, Sagan said,

Our team leader is Roman Kreuziger and I don't know what I can do. I'm not a good climber like he is. We'll see. There are three hard stages and a time trial to come

Sprinter Mark Cavendish could not hang in the mountains and was dropped from the peloton with 45 km to go. Had he not, a victory would have helped teammate Marco Pinotti remain in the leaders jersey.

Stage 1 results
Rank	Rider	Team	Time
1	Peter Sagan (SVK)	Liquigas–Doimo	4h 50' 21"
2	Francesco Gavazzi (ITA)	Lampre–Farnese Vini	+ 0"
3	Nicolas Roche (IRE)	Ag2r–La Mondiale	+ 0"
4	Maxim Iglinsky (KAZ)	Astana	+ 0"
5	Fabio Felline (ITA)	Footon–Servetto–Fuji	+ 0"
6	Robert Hunter (SAF)	Garmin–Transitions	+ 0"
7	Michel Kreder (NED)	Garmin–Transitions	+ 0"
8	Anders Lund (DEN)	Team Saxo Bank	+ 0"
9	Ben Swift (GBR)	Team Sky	+ 0"
10	Stefan Denifl (AUT)	Cervélo TestTeam	+ 0"

General classification after stage 1
Rank	Rider	Team	Time
1	Peter Sagan (SVK)	Liquigas–Doimo	4h 55' 29"
2	Marco Pinotti (ITA)	Team HTC–Columbia	+ 9"
3	Jérémy Roy (FRA)	Française des Jeux	+ 12"
4	Michael Rogers (AUS)	Team HTC–Columbia	+ 12"
5	Christophe Moreau (FRA)	Caisse d'Epargne	+ 14"
6	Francesco Gavazzi (ITA)	Lampre–Farnese Vini	+ 15"
7	Roman Kreuziger (CZE)	Liquigas–Doimo	+ 15"
8	Rubén Plaza (SPA)	Caisse d'Epargne	+ 15"
9	Haimar Zubeldia (SPA)	Team RadioShack	+ 15"
10	Nicolas Roche (IRE)	Ag2r–La Mondiale	+ 16"

=== Stage 2 ===
29 April 2010 – Fribourg to Fribourg, 171.8 kilometres (106.8 mi)

The course passed through Fribourg twice before a flat finish. Two category one climbs were listed. The course climbed the locally famous and steep cobbled climb "Lorette" twice.

Stage 2 results
Rank	Rider	Team	Time
1	Mark Cavendish (GBR)	Team HTC–Columbia	4h 28' 59"
2	Danilo Hondo (GER)	Lampre–Farnese Vini	+ 0"
3	Robert Hunter (SAF)	Garmin–Transitions	+ 0"
4	Lucas Sebastián Haedo (ARG)	Team Saxo Bank	+ 0"
5	Peter Sagan (SVK)	Liquigas–Doimo	+ 0"
6	Koldo Fernández (SPA)	Euskaltel–Euskadi	+ 0"
7	Danilo Wyss (SUI)	BMC Racing Team	+ 0"
8	Ben Swift (GBR)	Team Sky	+ 0"
9	Nicolas Roche (IRE)	Ag2r–La Mondiale	+ 0"
10	David Loosli (SUI)	Lampre–Farnese Vini	+ 0"

General classification after stage 2
Rank	Rider	Team	Time
1	Peter Sagan (SVK)	Liquigas–Doimo	9h 24' 28"
2	Marco Pinotti (ITA)	Team HTC–Columbia	+ 9"
3	Jérémy Roy (FRA)	Française des Jeux	+ 9"
4	Danilo Hondo (GER)	Lampre–Farnese Vini	+ 11"
5	Michael Rogers (AUS)	Team HTC–Columbia	+ 12"
6	Christophe Moreau (FRA)	Caisse d'Epargne	+ 14"
7	Francesco Gavazzi (ITA)	Lampre–Farnese Vini	+ 15"
8	Roman Kreuziger (CZE)	Liquigas–Doimo	+ 15"
9	Rubén Plaza (SPA)	Caisse d'Epargne	+ 15"
10	Haimar Zubeldia (SPA)	Team RadioShack	+ 15"

=== Stage 3 ===
30 April 2010 – Moudon to Moudon, 23.4 kilometres (14.5 mi) (ITT)

It's a short time trial but the first 7 kilometres are uphill at around 4%.

Stage 3 results
Rank	Rider	Team	Time
1	Richie Porte (AUS)	Team Saxo Bank	30' 54"
2	Vladimir Karpets	Team Katusha	+ 27"
3	Michael Rogers (AUS)	Team HTC–Columbia	+ 29"
4	Denis Menchov	Rabobank	+ 31"
5	Artem Ovechkin	Team Katusha	+ 31"
6	Janez Brajkovič (SLO)	Team RadioShack	+ 36"
7	Christophe Moreau (FRA)	Caisse d'Epargne	+ 51"
8	Simon Špilak (SLO)	Lampre–Farnese Vini	+ 54"
9	Tiago Machado (POR)	Team RadioShack	+ 59"
10	Jean-Christophe Péraud (FRA)	Omega Pharma–Lotto	+ 1' 01"

General classification after stage 3
Rank	Rider	Team	Time
1	Michael Rogers (AUS)	Team HTC–Columbia	9h 56' 03"
2	Alejandro Valverde (SPA)	Caisse d'Epargne	+ 2"
3	Vladimir Karpets	Team Katusha	+ 5"
4	Artem Ovechkin	Team Katusha	+ 7"
5	Denis Menchov	Rabobank	+ 9"
6	Janez Brajkovič (SLO)	Team RadioShack	+ 15"
7	Richie Porte (AUS)	Team Saxo Bank	+ 17"
8	Christophe Moreau (FRA)	Caisse d'Epargne	+ 24"
9	Simon Špilak (SLO)	Lampre–Farnese Vini	+ 35"
10	Tiago Machado (POR)	Team RadioShack	+ 39"

=== Stage 4 ===
1 May 2010 – Vevey to Châtel-Saint-Denis, 157.9 kilometres (98.1 mi)

For the first time in more than 40 years, the Tour de Romandie had a stage finish in France. Starting in Vevey (Switzerland), the route passed UCI headquarters in Aigle before turning up into the French Alps climbing the first category "Pas de Morgins."

The top of the climb is the Swiss / French border. The final climb – the Category 1 Col du Corbier – is 6 kilometres (3.7 mi) at roughly 8% – not easy. And while the summit is 20+ km from the finish, the last 17 kilometres (11 mi) are a gradual uphill.

Before this stage, Mark Cavendish, the winner of stage 2, was withdrawn by his team for his two-fingered celebration after victory.

Stage 4 results
Rank	Rider	Team	Time
1	Simon Špilak (SLO)	Lampre–Farnese Vini	4h 05' 25"
2	Peter Sagan (SVK)	Liquigas–Doimo	+ 13"
3	Philippe Gilbert (BEL)	Omega Pharma–Lotto	+ 13"
4	Hubert Dupont (FRA)	Ag2r–La Mondiale	+ 15"
5	Marcel Wyss (SUI)	Cervélo TestTeam	+ 22"
6	Vladimir Karpets	Team Katusha	+ 22"
7	Janez Brajkovič (SLO)	Team RadioShack	+ 22"
8	Michael Rogers (AUS)	Team HTC–Columbia	+ 22"
9	Jérémy Roy (FRA)	Française des Jeux	+ 22"
10	Igor Antón (SPA)	Euskaltel–Euskadi	+ 22"

General classification after stage 4
Rank	Rider	Team	Time
1	Michael Rogers (AUS)	Team HTC–Columbia	14h 01' 48"
2	Alejandro Valverde (SPA)	Caisse d'Epargne	+ 1"
3	Simon Špilak (SLO)	Lampre–Farnese Vini	+ 5"
4	Vladimir Karpets	Team Katusha	+ 7"
5	Denis Menchov	Rabobank	+ 10"
6	Janez Brajkovič (SLO)	Team RadioShack	+ 17"
7	Richie Porte (AUS)	Team Saxo Bank	+ 19"
8	Christophe Moreau (FRA)	Caisse d'Epargne	+ 26"
9	Tiago Machado (POR)	Team RadioShack	+ 41"
10	Peter Sagan (SVK)	Liquigas–Doimo	+ 41"

=== Stage 5 ===
2 May 2010 – Sion to Sion, 121.8 kilometres (75.7 mi)

The "Queen" stage, this stage is very short but has three very difficult climbs.

Stage 5 results
Rank	Rider	Team	Time
~~1~~	~~Alejandro Valverde~~ (SPA)	~~Caisse d'Epargne~~	~~3h 36' 19"~~
1	Igor Antón (SPA)	Euskaltel–Euskadi	+ 0"
2	Simon Špilak (SLO)	Lampre–Farnese Vini	+ 0"
3	Denis Menchov	Rabobank	+ 0"
4	Tiago Machado (POR)	Team RadioShack	+ 23"
5	John Gadret (FRA)	Ag2r–La Mondiale	+ 23"
6	Janez Brajkovič (SLO)	Team RadioShack	+ 23"
7	Marcel Wyss (SUI)	Cervélo TestTeam	+ 23"
8	Vladimir Karpets	Team Katusha	+ 23"
9	Michael Rogers (AUS)	Team HTC–Columbia	+ 23"
10	Marco Pinotti (ITA)	Team HTC–Columbia	+ 23"

General classification after stage 5
Rank	Rider	Team	Time
~~1~~	~~Alejandro Valverde~~ (SPA)	~~Caisse d'Epargne~~	~~17h 37' 55"~~
1	Simon Špilak (SLO)	Lampre–Farnese Vini	+ 11"
2	Denis Menchov	Rabobank	+ 21"
3	Michael Rogers (AUS)	Team HTC–Columbia	+ 35"
4	Vladimir Karpets	Team Katusha	+ 42"
5	Janez Brajkovič (SLO)	Team RadioShack	+ 52"
6	Tiago Machado (POR)	Team RadioShack	+ 1' 16"
7	Marco Pinotti (ITA)	Team HTC–Columbia	+ 1' 27"
8	Marcel Wyss (SUI)	Cervélo TestTeam	+ 1' 28"
9	Igor Antón (SPA)	Euskaltel–Euskadi	+ 1' 34"
10	Richie Porte (AUS)	Team Saxo Bank	+ 2' 10"

== Classification leadership ==
Classification leadership by stage
Stage	Winner	General classification	Points classification	Mountains classification	Young rider classification	Team classification
P	Marco Pinotti	Marco Pinotti	Not Awarded	Not Awarded	Peter Sagan	Team HTC–Columbia
1	Peter Sagan	Peter Sagan	Thibaut Pinot	Thibaut Pinot	Peter Sagan	Team HTC–Columbia
2	Mark Cavendish	Peter Sagan	Thibaut Pinot	Thibaut Pinot	Peter Sagan	Team HTC–Columbia
3	Richie Porte	Michael Rogers	Thibaut Pinot	Thibaut Pinot	Artem Ovechkin	Team Katusha
4	Simon Špilak	Michael Rogers	Thibaut Pinot	Thibaut Pinot	Simon Špilak	Caisse d'Epargne
5	~~Alejandro Valverde~~; Igor Antón	~~Alejandro Valverde~~; Simon Špilak	Thibaut Pinot	Thibaut Pinot	Simon Špilak	Team RadioShack
Final		~~Alejandro Valverde~~; Simon Špilak	Thibaut Pinot	Thibaut Pinot	Simon Špilak	Team RadioShack

== Classification standings ==
=== General classification ===
Final general classification (1–10)
Rank	Rider	Team	Time
~~1~~	~~Alejandro Valverde~~ (SPA)	~~Caisse d'Epargne~~	~~17h 37' 55"~~
1	Simon Špilak (SLO)	Lampre–Farnese Vini	+ 11"
2	Denis Menchov	Rabobank	+ 21"
3	Michael Rogers (AUS)	Team HTC–Columbia	+ 35"
4	Vladimir Karpets	Team Katusha	+ 42"
5	Janez Brajkovič (SLO)	Team RadioShack	+ 52"
6	Tiago Machado (POR)	Team RadioShack	+ 1' 16"
7	Marco Pinotti (ITA)	Team HTC–Columbia	+ 1' 27"
8	Marcel Wyss (SUI)	Cervélo TestTeam	+ 1' 28"
9	Igor Antón (SPA)	Euskaltel–Euskadi	+ 1' 34"
10	Richie Porte (AUS)	Team Saxo Bank	+ 2' 10"

=== Mountains classification ===
Final mountains classification (1–10)
Rank	Rider	Team	Points
1	Thibaut Pinot (FRA)	Française des Jeux	54
2	Chad Beyer (USA)	BMC Racing Team	24
3	Denis Menchov	Rabobank	18
4	Alan Pérez (SPA)	Euskaltel–Euskadi	16
5	Sérgio Paulinho (POR)	Team RadioShack	14
6	Igor Antón (SPA)	Euskaltel–Euskadi	12
7	Alejandro Valverde (SPA)	Caisse d'Epargne	12
8	Alexander Efimkin	Ag2r–La Mondiale	12
9	Jérémy Roy (FRA)	Française des Jeux	8
10	Juan Mauricio Soler (COL)	Caisse d'Epargne	6

=== Young rider classification ===
Final young rider classification (1–10)
Rank	Rider	Team	Time
1	Simon Špilak (SLO)	Lampre–Farnese Vini	17h 38' 06"
2	Marcel Wyss (SUI)	Cervélo TestTeam	+ 1' 17"
3	Peter Sagan (SVK)	Liquigas–Doimo	+ 2' 21"
4	Eros Capecchi (ITA)	Footon–Servetto–Fuji	+ 3' 09"
5	Fabio Felline (ITA)	Footon–Servetto–Fuji	+ 7' 57"
6	Artem Ovechkin	Team Katusha	+ 8' 28"
7	Thibaut Pinot (FRA)	Française des Jeux	+ 8' 30"
8	Alexandre Pliușchin (MDA)	Team Katusha	+ 13' 23"
9	Bauke Mollema (NED)	Rabobank	+ 14' 32"
10	Adriano Malori (ITA)	Lampre–Farnese Vini	+ 15' 44"

=== Team classification ===
Final team classification (1–10)
Rank	Team	Time
1	(United States) Team RadioShack	52h 58' 59"
2	(Spain) Caisse d'Epargne	+ 19"
3	(France) Française des Jeux	+ 3' 34"
4	(Netherlands) Rabobank	+ 9' 21"
5	(France) Ag2r–La Mondiale	+ 10' 59"
6	(Spain) Footon–Servetto–Fuji	+ 14' 14"
7	Team Katusha	+ 16' 20"
8	(United Kingdom) Team Sky	+ 16' 45"
9	(Italy) Lampre–Farnese Vini	+ 21' 18"
10	(Italy) Liquigas–Doimo	+ 21' 44"
