= List of teams and cyclists in the 2010 Vuelta a España =

The 2010 Vuelta a España is the 65th edition of Vuelta a España, one of cycling's Grand Tours. This Vuelta features 22 cycling teams. Seventeen of the teams invited to the Vuela are a part of the UCI ProTour, the other five teams are Professional Continental teams. The Vuelta will begin in Seville on August 28 and finish on in Madrid on September 19.

2009 Vuelta champion Alejandro Valverde is under suspension, and is thus not part of the field. Bib number one will be worn by Cervélo TestTeam's Íñigo Cuesta, a gesture by the race organizers to commemorate his record-breaking 17th consecutive appearance in the race.

== Startlist ==
As of August 27, 2010

Legend
No.	Starting number worn by the rider during the Vuelta	Pos.	Position in the general classification
HD	Denotes a rider finished outside the time limit, followed by the stage in which they did so	DNS	Denotes a rider who did not start, followed by the stage before which they withdrew
DNF	Denotes a rider who did not finish, followed by the stage in which they withdrew	DSQ	Denotes a rider who was disqualified, followed by the stage in which they were withdrawn

=== By Team ===
Cervélo TestTeam CTT
No.	Rider	Pos.
1	Íñigo Cuesta (ESP)	26
2	Theo Bos (NED)	DNF-17
3	Philip Deignan (IRE)	DNF-11
4	Stefan Denifl (AUT)	DNF-14
5	Xavier Florencio (ESP)	104
6	Óscar Pujol (ESP)	66
7	Thor Hushovd (NOR)	DNS-17
8	Carlos Sastre (ESP)	8
9	Xavier Tondó (ESP)	6
General manager: Joop Alberda

Ag2r–La Mondiale ALM
No.	Rider	Pos.
11	Nicolas Roche (IRE)	7
12	José Luis Arrieta (ESP)	DNF-15
13	Guillaume Bonnafond (FRA)	58
14	Hubert Dupont (FRA)	55
15	Sébastien Hinault (FRA)	
16	Blel Kadri (FRA)	
17	Rinaldo Nocentini (ITA)	
18	Christophe Riblon (FRA)	
19	Ludovic Turpin (FRA)	
General manager: Vincent Lavenu

Andalucía–Cajasur ACA
No.	Rider	Pos.
21	José Ángel Gómez Marchante (ESP)	
22	Jorge Montenegro (ARG)	
23	Sergio Carrasco (ESP)	
24	Juan Javier Estrada (ESP)	
25	Javier Moreno (ESP)	
26	Manuel Ortega (ESP)	
27	Antonio Piedra (ESP)	
28	Javier Ramírez (ESP)	
29	José Vicente Toribio (ESP)	
General manager: Antonio Cabello

Astana AST
No.	Rider	Pos.
31	Sergey Renev (KAZ)	
32	Assan Bazayev (KAZ)	
33	Allan Davis (AUS)	
34	Alexsandr Dyachenko (KAZ)	
35	Dmitry Fofonov (KAZ)	
36	Enrico Gasparotto (ITA)	
37	Valentin Iglinsky (KAZ)	
38	Josep Jufré (ESP)	
39	Andrey Zeits (KAZ)	
General manager: Yvon Sanquer

Bbox Bouygues Telecom BBO
No.	Rider	Pos.
41	Johann Tschopp (SUI)	
42	William Bonnet (FRA)	
43	Freddy Bichot (FRA)	DNF-9
44	Vincent Jérôme (FRA)	
45	Alexandre Pichot (FRA)	
46	Perrig Quéméneur (FRA)	
47	Pierre Rolland (FRA)	DNF-9
48	Matthieu Sprick (FRA)	
49	Nicolas Vogondy (FRA)	DNS-19
General manager: Jean-René Bernaudeau

Caisse d'Epargne GCE
No.	Rider	Pos.
51	David Arroyo (ESP)	
52	Marzio Bruseghin (ITA)	
53	Imanol Erviti (ESP)	
54	José Vicente García (ESP)	
55	David López (ESP)	
56	Luis Pasamontes (ESP)	
57	Rubén Plaza (ESP)	
58	Luis León Sánchez (ESP)	
59	Rigoberto Urán (COL)	
General manager: Eusebio Unzué

Cofidis COF
No.	Rider	Pos.
61	Samuel Dumoulin (FRA)	
62	Tony Gallopin (FRA)	
63	Mickaël Buffaz (FRA)	DNF-2
64	Arnaud Labbe (FRA)	
65	David Moncoutié (FRA)	
66	Rémi Pauriol (FRA)	
67	Nico Sijmens (BEL)	
68	Sébastien Minard (FRA)	
69	Romain Zingle (BEL)	
General manager: Éric Boyer

Euskaltel–Euskadi EUS
No.	Rider	Pos.
71	Igor Antón (ESP)	DNF-14
72	Koldo Fernández (ESP)	
73	Beñat Intxausti (ESP)	DNF-15
74	Egoi Martínez (ESP)	DNF-14
75	Mikel Nieve (ESP)	
76	Juan José Oroz (ESP)	
77	Amets Txurruka (ESP)	
78	Pablo Urtasun (ESP)	
79	Gorka Verdugo (ESP)	
General manager: Igor González de Galdeano

Footon–Servetto–Fuji FOT
No.	Rider	Pos.
81	José Alberto Benítez (ESP)	
82	Manuel Cardoso (POR)	
83	Giampaolo Cheula (ITA)	
84	Arkaitz Durán (ESP)	DNF-2
85	David Gutiérrez Gutiérrez (ESP)	
86	Enrique Mata (ESP)	
87	Martin Pedersen (DEN)	
88	Johnnie Walker (AUS)	
89	David Vitoria (SUI)	DNF-12
General manager: Mauro Giannetti

FDJ FDJ
No.	Rider	Pos.
91	Christophe Le Mével (FRA)	
92	Rémy Di Gregorio (FRA)	
93	Pierre Cazaux (FRA)	
94	Sébastien Chavanel (FRA)	
95	Mikaël Cherel (FRA)	
96	Yauheni Hutarovich (BLR)	
97	Gianni Meersman (BEL)	
98	Yoann Offredo (FRA)	DNF-10
99	Arthur Vichot (FRA)	DNF-15
General manager: Marc Madiot

Garmin–Transitions GRM
No.	Rider	Pos.
101	Tom Danielson (USA)	
102	Julian Dean (NZL)	DNF-13
103	Tyler Farrar (USA)	
104	Michel Kreder (NED)	
105	(United Kingdom) David Millar (GBR)	
106	Thomas Peterson (USA)	
107	Christian Vande Velde (USA)	
108	Matt Wilson (AUS)	
109	David Zabriskie (USA)	DNS-18
General manager: Jonathan Vaughters

Lampre–Farnese LAM
No.	Rider	Pos.
111	Alessandro Petacchi (ITA)	DNF-9
112	Grega Bole (SLO)	
113	Danilo Hondo (GER)	
114	Andrey Kashechkin (KAZ)	
115	Angelo Furlan (ITA)	
116	Marco Marzano (ITA)	
117	Manuele Mori (ITA)	
118	Daniele Pietropolli (ITA)	
119	Daniele Righi (ITA)	
General manager: Giuseppe Saronni

Liquigas–Doimo LIQ
No.	Rider	Pos.
121	Daniele Bennati (ITA)	
122	Mauro Finetto (ITA)	
123	Jacopo Guarnieri (ITA)	
124	Maciej Paterski (POL)	
125	Roman Kreuziger (CZE)	
126	Vincenzo Nibali (ITA)	
127	Oliver Zaugg (SUI)	
128	Ivan Santaromita (ITA)	
129	Frederik Willems (BEL)	
General manager: Roberto Amadio

Omega Pharma–Lotto OLO
No.	Rider	Pos.
131	Jan Bakelants (BEL)	
132	Jurgen Van Goolen (BEL)	
133	Mickaël Delage (FRA)	DNF-9
134	Philippe Gilbert (BEL)	
135	Leif Hoste (BEL)	
136	Olivier Kaisen (BEL)	
137	Jean-Christophe Péraud (FRA)	
138	Greg Van Avermaet (BEL)	
139	Jelle Vanendert (BEL)	DNF-15
General manager: Marc Sergeant

Quick-Step QST
No.	Rider	Pos.
141	Carlos Barredo (ESP)	
142	Dario Cataldo (ITA)	
143	Kevin De Weert (BEL)	
144	Nikolas Maes (BEL)	
145	Davide Malacarne (ITA)	
146	Branislau Samoilau (BLR)	DNF-8
147	Andreas Stauff (GER)	
148	Matteo Tosatto (ITA)	
149	Wouter Weylandt (BEL)	
General manager: Patrick Lefevere

Rabobank RAB
No.	Rider	Pos.
151	Mauricio Ardila (COL)	
152	Óscar Freire (ESP)	DNS-15
153	Juan Manuel Gárate (ESP)	
154	Dmitry Kozonchuk (RUS)	
155	Sebastian Langeveld (NED)	
156	Grischa Niermann (GER)	
157	Denis Menchov (RUS)	
158	Laurens ten Dam (NED)	DNF-16
159	Nick Nuyens (BEL)	
General manager: Erik Breukink

Team Sky SKY
No.	Rider	Pos.
161	Thomas Löfkvist (SWE)	DNS-8
162	John-Lee Augustyn (RSA)	DNF-3
163	Kjell Carlström (FIN)	DNS-8
164	Juan Antonio Flecha (ESP)	DNF-7
165	Simon Gerrans (AUS)	DNS-8
166	(United Kingdom) Peter Kennaugh (GBR)	DNS-8
167	Lars Petter Nordhaug (NOR)	DNS-8
168	(United Kingdom) Ian Stannard (GBR)	DNS-8
169	(United Kingdom) Ben Swift (GBR)	DNF-3
General manager: Dave Brailsford

Team HTC–Columbia THR
No.	Rider	Pos.
171	Lars Bak (DEN)	
172	(United Kingdom) Mark Cavendish (GBR)	
173	Bernhard Eisel (AUT)	DNF-4
174	Matthew Goss (AUS)	
175	Hayden Roulston (NZL)	DNF-13
176	Kanstantsin Sivtsov (BLR)	
177	Tejay van Garderen (USA)	
178	Martin Velits (SVK)	
179	Peter Velits (SVK)	
General manager: Bob Stapleton

Team Katusha KAT
No.	Rider	Pos.
181	Joaquim Rodríguez (ESP)	
182	Giampaolo Caruso (ITA)	
183	Denis Galimzyanov (RUS)	DNF-14
184	Vladimir Gusev (RUS)	
185	Joan Horrach (ESP)	
186	Vladimir Karpets (RUS)	
187	Alexandr Kolobnev (RUS)	
188	Mikhail Ignatiev (RUS)	
189	Filippo Pozzato (ITA)	DNF-20
General manager: Andrei Tchmil

Team Milram MRM
No.	Rider	Pos.
191	Robert Förster (GER)	
192	Markus Fothen (GER)	DNS-11
193	Markus Eichler (GER)	
194	Dominik Roels (GER)	
195	Johannes Fröhlinger (GER)	
196	Björn Schröder (GER)	
197	Roy Sentjens (BEL)	DNS-12
198	Niki Terpstra (NED)	
199	Paul Voss (GER)	
General manager: Gerry van Gerwen

Team Saxo Bank SAX
No.	Rider	Pos.
201	Anders Lund (DEN)	
202	Fabian Cancellara (SUI)	DNF-19
203	Kasper Klostergaard (DEN)	
204	Juan José Haedo (ARG)	
205	Dominic Klemme (GER)	
206	Gustav Larsson (SWE)	
207	Stuart O'Grady (AUS)	DNS-10
208	Andy Schleck (LUX)	DNS-10
209	Fränk Schleck (LUX)	
General manager: Bjarne Riis

Xacobeo–Galicia XAC
No.	Rider	Pos.
211	Ezequiel Mosquera (ESP)	
212	Gustavo César (ESP)	
213	Delio Fernández (ESP)	
214	David García (ESP)	
215	Marcos García (ESP)	
216	Vladimir Isaichev (RUS)	
217	Serafín Martínez (ESP)	
218	Gonzalo Rabuñal (ESP)	
219	Gustavo Rodríguez (ESP)	
General manager: Álvaro Pino

=== By rider ===
Legend
No.	Starting number worn by the rider during the Vuelta
Pos.	Position in the general classification
DNS	Denotes a rider who did not start, followed by the stage before which he withdrew
DNF	Denotes a rider who did not finish, followed by the stage in which he withdrew
HD	Denotes a rider who finished outside the time limit, followed by the stage where he was eliminated from the race.
Age correct as of 28 August 2010, the date on which the Vuelta began

Number	Name	Team	Nationality	Age	Position
1	Íñigo Cuesta	Cervélo TestTeam	Spain	41	
2	Theo Bos	Cervélo TestTeam	Netherlands	27	
3	Philip Deignan	Cervélo TestTeam	Ireland	26	DNF-11
4	Stefan Denifl	Cervélo TestTeam	Austria	22	DNF-14
5	Xavier Florencio	Cervélo TestTeam	Spain	30	
6	Óscar Pujol	Cervélo TestTeam	Spain	26	
7	Thor Hushovd	Cervélo TestTeam	Norway	32	
8	Carlos Sastre	Cervélo TestTeam	Spain	35	
9	Xavier Tondó	Cervélo TestTeam	Spain	31	
11	Nicolas Roche	Ag2r–La Mondiale	Ireland	26	
12	José Luis Arrieta	Ag2r–La Mondiale	Spain	39	
13	Guillaume Bonnafond	Ag2r–La Mondiale	France	23	
14	Hubert Dupont	Ag2r–La Mondiale	France	29	
15	Sébastien Hinault	Ag2r–La Mondiale	France	36	
16	Blel Kadri	Ag2r–La Mondiale	France	23	
17	Rinaldo Nocentini	Ag2r–La Mondiale	Italy	32	
18	Christophe Riblon	Ag2r–La Mondiale	France	29	
19	Ludovic Turpin	Ag2r–La Mondiale	France	35	
21	José Ángel Gómez Marchante	Andalucía–Cajasur	Spain	30	
22	Jorge Montenegro	Andalucía–Cajasur	Argentina	27	
23	Sergio Carrasco	Andalucía–Cajasur	Spain	25	
24	Juan Javier Estrada	Andalucía–Cajasur	Spain	29	
25	Javier Moreno	Andalucía–Cajasur	Spain	26	
26	Manuel Ortega	Andalucía–Cajasur	Spain	29	
27	Antonio Piedra	Andalucía–Cajasur	Spain	24	
28	Javier Ramírez	Andalucía–Cajasur	Spain	32	
29	José Vicente Toribio	Andalucía–Cajasur	Spain	24	
31	Sergey Renev	Astana	Kazakhstan	25	
32	Assan Bazayev	Astana	Kazakhstan	29	
33	Allan Davis	Astana	Australia	30	
34	Alexsandr Dyachenko	Astana	Kazakhstan	26	
35	Dmitry Fofonov	Astana	Kazakhstan	34	
36	Enrico Gasparotto	Astana	Italy	28	
37	Valentin Iglinsky	Astana	Kazakhstan	29	
38	Josep Jufré	Astana	Spain	35	
39	Andrey Zeits	Astana	Kazakhstan	23	
41	Johann Tschopp	Bbox Bouygues Telecom	France	28	
42	William Bonnet	Bbox Bouygues Telecom	France	27	
43	Freddy Bichot	Bbox Bouygues Telecom	France	30	DNF-9
44	Vincent Jérôme	Bbox Bouygues Telecom	France	25	
45	Alexandre Pichot	Bbox Bouygues Telecom	France	27	
46	Perrig Quéméneur	Bbox Bouygues Telecom	France	26	
47	Pierre Rolland	Bbox Bouygues Telecom	France	23	DNF-9
48	Matthieu Sprick	Bbox Bouygues Telecom	France	28	
49	Nicolas Vogondy	Bbox Bouygues Telecom	France	33	
51	David Arroyo	Caisse d'Epargne	Spain	30	
52	Marzio Bruseghin	Caisse d'Epargne	Italy	36	
53	Imanol Erviti	Caisse d'Epargne	Spain	26	
54	José Vicente García	Caisse d'Epargne	Spain	38	
55	David López	Caisse d'Epargne	Spain	29	
56	Luis Pasamontes	Caisse d'Epargne	Spain	30	
57	Rubén Plaza	Caisse d'Epargne	Spain	30	
58	Luis León Sánchez	Caisse d'Epargne	Spain	26	
59	Rigoberto Urán	Caisse d'Epargne	Colombia	23	
61	Samuel Dumoulin	Cofidis	France	30	
62	Tony Gallopin	Cofidis	France	22	
63	Mickaël Buffaz	Cofidis	France	31	DNF-2
64	Arnaud Labbe	Cofidis	France	33	
65	David Moncoutié	Cofidis	France	35	
66	Rémi Pauriol	Cofidis	France	28	
67	Nico Sijmens	Cofidis	Belgium	32	
68	Sébastien Minard	Cofidis	France	28	
69	Romain Zingle	Cofidis	Belgium	23	
71	Igor Antón	Euskaltel–Euskadi	Spain	27	DNF-14
72	Koldo Fernández	Euskaltel–Euskadi	Spain	28	
73	Beñat Intxausti	Euskaltel–Euskadi	Spain	24	DNF-15
74	Egoi Martínez	Euskaltel–Euskadi	Spain	32	DNF-14
75	Mikel Nieve	Euskaltel–Euskadi	Spain	26	
76	Juan José Oroz	Euskaltel–Euskadi	Spain	29	
77	Amets Txurruka	Euskaltel–Euskadi	Spain	27	
78	Pablo Urtasun	Euskaltel–Euskadi	Spain	30	
79	Gorka Verdugo	Euskaltel–Euskadi	Spain	31	
81	José Alberto Benítez	Footon–Servetto–Fuji	Spain	28	
82	Manuel Cardoso	Footon–Servetto–Fuji	Portugal	27	
83	Giampaolo Cheula	Footon–Servetto–Fuji	Italy	31	
84	Arkaitz Durán	Footon–Servetto–Fuji	Spain	24	HD-2
85	David Gutiérrez Gutiérrez	Footon–Servetto–Fuji	Spain	27	
86	Enrique Mata	Footon–Servetto–Fuji	Spain	25	
87	Martin Pedersen	Footon–Servetto–Fuji	Denmark	27	
88	Johnnie Walker	Footon–Servetto–Fuji	Australia	23	
89	David Vitoria	Footon–Servetto–Fuji	Switzerland	25	DNF-12
91	Christophe Le Mével	FDJ	France	29	
92	Rémy Di Gregorio	FDJ	France	25	
93	Pierre Cazaux	FDJ	France	26	
94	Sébastien Chavanel	FDJ	France	29	
95	Mikaël Cherel	FDJ	France	24	
96	Yauheni Hutarovich	FDJ	Belarus	26	
97	Gianni Meersman	FDJ	Belgium	24	
98	Yoann Offredo	FDJ	France	23	DNF-10
99	Arthur Vichot	FDJ	France	21	
101	Tom Danielson	Garmin–Transitions	United States	32	
102	Julian Dean	Garmin–Transitions	New Zealand	35	DNS-13
103	Tyler Farrar	Garmin–Transitions	United States	26	
104	Michel Kreder	Garmin–Transitions	Netherlands	23	
105	David Millar	Garmin–Transitions	(United Kingdom) Great Britain	33	
106	Thomas Peterson	Garmin–Transitions	United States	23	
107	Christian Vande Velde	Garmin–Transitions	United States	34	
108	Matt Wilson	Garmin–Transitions	Australia	32	
109	David Zabriskie	Garmin–Transitions	United States	31	
111	Alessandro Petacchi	Lampre–Farnese	Italy	36	DNF-9
112	Grega Bole	Lampre–Farnese	Slovenia	25	
113	Danilo Hondo	Lampre–Farnese	Germany	36	
114	Andrey Kashechkin	Lampre–Farnese	Kazakhstan	30	
115	Angelo Furlan	Lampre–Farnese	Italy	33	
116	Marco Marzano	Lampre–Farnese	Italy	30	
117	Manuele Mori	Lampre–Farnese	Italy	36	
118	Daniele Pietropolli	Lampre–Farnese	Italy	30	
119	Daniele Righi	Lampre–Farnese	Italy	34	
121	Daniele Bennati	Liquigas–Doimo	Italy	29	
122	Mauro Finetto	Liquigas–Doimo	Italy	31	
123	Jacopo Guarnieri	Liquigas–Doimo	Italy	23	
124	Maciej Paterski	Liquigas–Doimo	Poland	23	
125	Roman Kreuziger	Liquigas–Doimo	Czech Republic	24	
126	Vincenzo Nibali	Liquigas–Doimo	Italy	25	
127	Oliver Zaugg	Liquigas–Doimo	Switzerland	29	
128	Ivan Santaromita	Liquigas–Doimo	Italy	26	
129	Frederik Willems	Liquigas–Doimo	Belgium	30	
131	Jan Bakelants	Omega Pharma–Lotto	Belgium	24	
132	Jurgen Van Goolen	Omega Pharma–Lotto	Belgium	29	
133	Mickaël Delage	Omega Pharma–Lotto	France	25	DNF-9
134	Philippe Gilbert	Omega Pharma–Lotto	Belgium	28	
135	Leif Hoste	Omega Pharma–Lotto	Belgium	33	
136	Olivier Kaisen	Omega Pharma–Lotto	Belgium	27	
137	Jean-Christophe Péraud	Omega Pharma–Lotto	France	33	
138	Greg Van Avermaet	Omega Pharma–Lotto	Belgium	25	
139	Jelle Vanendert	Omega Pharma–Lotto	Belgium	25	DNF-15
141	Carlos Barredo	Quick-Step	Spain	29	
142	Dario Cataldo	Quick-Step	Italy	25	
143	Kevin De Weert	Quick-Step	Belgium	28	
144	Nikolas Maes	Quick-Step	Belgium	24	
145	Davide Malacarne	Quick-Step	Italy	23	
146	Branislau Samoilau	Quick-Step	Belarus	25	DNF-8
147	Andreas Stauff	Quick-Step	Germany	23	
148	Matteo Tosatto	Quick-Step	Italy	36	
149	Wouter Weylandt	Quick-Step	Belgium	25	
151	Mauricio Ardila	Rabobank	Colombia	31	
152	Óscar Freire	Rabobank	Spain	34	DNS-15
153	Juan Manuel Gárate	Rabobank	Spain	34	
154	Dmitry Kozonchuk	Rabobank	Russia	26	
155	Sebastian Langeveld	Rabobank	Netherlands	25	
156	Grischa Niermann	Rabobank	Germany	34	
157	Denis Menchov	Rabobank	Russia	32	
158	Laurens ten Dam	Rabobank	Netherlands	29	
159	Nick Nuyens	Rabobank	Belgium	30	
161	Thomas Löfkvist	Team Sky	Sweden	26	DNS-8
162	John-Lee Augustyn	Team Sky	South Africa	24	DNF-3
163	Kjell Carlström	Team Sky	Finland	33	DNS-8
164	Juan Antonio Flecha	Team Sky	Spain	32	DNF-7
165	Simon Gerrans	Team Sky	Australia	30	DNS-8
166	Peter Kennaugh	Team Sky	(United Kingdom) Great Britain	21	DNS-8
167	Lars Petter Nordhaug	Team Sky	Norway	26	DNS-8
168	Ian Stannard	Team Sky	(United Kingdom) Great Britain	23	DNS-8
169	Ben Swift	Team Sky	(United Kingdom) Great Britain	22	DNF-3
171	Lars Bak	Team HTC–Columbia	Denmark	30	
172	Mark Cavendish	Team HTC–Columbia	(United Kingdom) Great Britain	25	
173	Bernhard Eisel	Team HTC–Columbia	Austria	29	DNF-4
174	Matthew Goss	Team HTC–Columbia	Australia	23	
175	Hayden Roulston	Team HTC–Columbia	New Zealand	29	DNF-13
176	Kanstantsin Sivtsov	Team HTC–Columbia	Belarus	28	
177	Tejay van Garderen	Team HTC–Columbia	United States	22	
178	Martin Velits	Team HTC–Columbia	Slovakia	25	
179	Peter Velits	Team HTC–Columbia	Slovakia	25	
181	Joaquim Rodríguez	Team Katusha	Spain	31	
182	Giampaolo Caruso	Team Katusha	Italy	30	
183	Denis Galimzyanov	Team Katusha	Russia	23	DNS-14
184	Vladimir Gusev	Team Katusha	Russia	28	
185	Joan Horrach	Team Katusha	Spain	36	
186	Vladimir Karpets	Team Katusha	Russia	29	
187	Alexandr Kolobnev	Team Katusha	Russia	29	
188	Mikhail Ignatiev	Team Katusha	Russia	25	
189	Filippo Pozzato	Team Katusha	Italy	28	
191	Robert Förster	Team Milram	Germany	32	
192	Markus Fothen	Team Milram	Germany	28	DNS-11
193	Markus Eichler	Team Milram	Germany	28	
194	Dominik Roels	Team Milram	Germany	23	
195	Johannes Fröhlinger	Team Milram	Germany	25	
196	Björn Schröder	Team Milram	Germany	29	
197	Roy Sentjens	Team Milram	Belgium	29	DNS-12
198	Niki Terpstra	Team Milram	Netherlands	26	
199	Paul Voss	Team Milram	Germany	24	
201	Anders Lund	Team Saxo Bank	Denmark	25	
202	Fabian Cancellara	Team Saxo Bank	Switzerland	29	
203	Kasper Klostergaard	Team Saxo Bank	Denmark	27	
204	Juan José Haedo	Team Saxo Bank	Argentina	29	
205	Dominic Klemme	Team Saxo Bank	Germany	23	
206	Gustav Larsson	Team Saxo Bank	Sweden	29	
207	Stuart O'Grady	Team Saxo Bank	Australia	37	DNS-10
208	Andy Schleck	Team Saxo Bank	Luxembourg	25	DNS-10
209	Fränk Schleck	Team Saxo Bank	Luxembourg	30	
211	Ezequiel Mosquera	Xacobeo–Galicia	Spain	34	
212	Gustavo César	Xacobeo–Galicia	Spain	30	
213	Delio Fernández	Xacobeo–Galicia	Spain	24	
214	David García	Xacobeo–Galicia	Spain	32	
215	Marcos García	Xacobeo–Galicia	Spain	23	
216	Vladimir Isaichev	Xacobeo–Galicia	Russia	24	
217	Serafín Martínez	Xacobeo–Galicia	Spain	26	
218	Gonzalo Rabuñal	Xacobeo–Galicia	Spain	26	
219	Gustavo Rodríguez	Xacobeo–Galicia	Spain	30	
