= 2010 Vuelta a España, Stage 12 to Stage 21 =

Cycling race stages

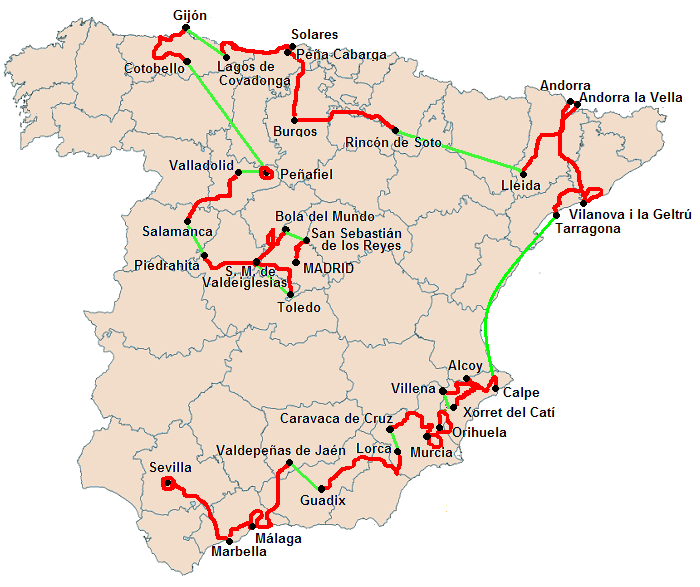
Overview of the stages

These were the individual stages of the 2010 Vuelta a España, with Stage 12 on 9 September to Stage 21 on 19 September.

== Stages ==
- s.t. indicates that the rider crossed the finish line in the same group as the one receiving the time above him, and was therefore credited with the same finishing time.

=== Stage 12 ===
9 September 2010 — Andorra la Vella (Andorra) to Lleida, 172.5 km (107.2 mi)

Stage 12 result

	Rider	Team	Time
1	Mark Cavendish (GBR)	Team HTC–Columbia	4h 00' 30"
2	Tyler Farrar (USA)	Garmin–Transitions	s.t.
3	Matthew Goss (AUS)	Team HTC–Columbia	s.t.
4	Denis Galimzyanov (RUS)	Team Katusha	s.t.
5	Thor Hushovd (NOR)	Cervélo TestTeam	s.t.
6	Óscar Freire (ESP)	Rabobank	s.t.
7	Allan Davis (AUS)	Astana	s.t.
8	Wouter Weylandt (BEL)	Quick-Step	s.t.
9	Sébastien Chavanel (FRA)	FDJ	s.t.
10	Philippe Gilbert (BEL)	Omega Pharma–Lotto	s.t.

General classification after stage 12

	Rider	Team	Time
1	Igor Antón (ESP)	Euskaltel–Euskadi	51h 37' 45"
2	Vincenzo Nibali (ITA)	Liquigas–Doimo	+ 45"
3	Xavier Tondó (ESP)	Cervélo TestTeam	+ 1' 04"
4	Joaquim Rodríguez (ESP)	Team Katusha	+ 1' 17"
5	Ezequiel Mosquera (ESP)	Xacobeo–Galicia	+ 1' 29"
6	Marzio Bruseghin (ITA)	Caisse d'Epargne	+ 1' 57"
7	Rubén Plaza (ESP)	Caisse d'Epargne	+ 2' 07"
8	Rigoberto Urán (COL)	Caisse d'Epargne	+ 2' 13"
9	Nicolas Roche (IRL)	Ag2r–La Mondiale	+ 2' 30"
10	Fränk Schleck (LUX)	Team Saxo Bank	+ 2' 30"

=== Stage 13 ===
10 September 2010 — Rincón de Soto to Burgos, 196 km (121.8 mi)

Stage 13 result

	Rider	Team	Time
1	Mark Cavendish (GBR)	Team HTC–Columbia	4h 50' 18"
2	Thor Hushovd (NOR)	Cervélo TestTeam	s.t.
3	Daniele Bennati (ITA)	Liquigas–Doimo	s.t.
4	Yauheni Hutarovich (BLR)	FDJ	s.t.
5	Manuel Antonio Cardoso (POR)	Footon–Servetto–Fuji	s.t.
6	Tyler Farrar (USA)	Garmin–Transitions	s.t.
7	Denis Galimzyanov (RUS)	Team Katusha	s.t.
8	Koldo Fernández (ESP)	Euskaltel–Euskadi	s.t.
9	Theo Bos (NED)	Cervélo TestTeam	s.t.
10	Johnnie Walker (AUS)	Footon–Servetto–Fuji	s.t.

General classification after stage 13

	Rider	Team	Time
1	Igor Antón (ESP)	Euskaltel–Euskadi	56h 28' 03"
2	Vincenzo Nibali (ITA)	Liquigas–Doimo	+ 45"
3	Xavier Tondó (ESP)	Cervélo TestTeam	+ 1' 04"
4	Joaquim Rodríguez (ESP)	Team Katusha	+ 1' 17"
5	Ezequiel Mosquera (ESP)	Xacobeo–Galicia	+ 1' 29"
6	Marzio Bruseghin (ITA)	Caisse d'Epargne	+ 1' 57"
7	Rubén Plaza (ESP)	Caisse d'Epargne	+ 2' 07"
8	Rigoberto Urán (COL)	Caisse d'Epargne	+ 2' 13"
9	Nicolas Roche (IRL)	Ag2r–La Mondiale	+ 2' 30"
10	Fränk Schleck (LUX)	Team Saxo Bank	+ 2' 30"

=== Stage 14 ===
11 September 2010 — Burgos to Peña Cabarga, 178 km (110.6 mi)

Stage 14 result

	Rider	Team	Time
1	Joaquim Rodríguez (ESP)	Team Katusha	4h 26' 43"
2	Vincenzo Nibali (ITA)	Liquigas–Doimo	+ 20"
3	Ezequiel Mosquera (ESP)	Xacobeo–Galicia	+ 22"
4	David Moncoutié (FRA)	Cofidis	+ 33"
5	Nicolas Roche (IRL)	Ag2r–La Mondiale	+ 34"
6	Fränk Schleck (LUX)	Team Saxo Bank	+ 35"
7	Xavier Tondó (ESP)	Cervélo TestTeam	+ 39"
8	~~David García (ESP)~~	~~Xacobeo–Galicia~~	+ 43"
9	Peter Velits (SVK)	Team HTC–Columbia	+ 45"
10	Tom Danielson (USA)	Garmin–Transitions	+ 1' 29"

General classification after stage 14

	Rider	Team	Time
1	Vincenzo Nibali (ITA)	Liquigas–Doimo	60h 55' 39"
2	Joaquim Rodríguez (ESP)	Team Katusha	+ 4"
3	Ezequiel Mosquera (ESP)	Xacobeo–Galicia	+ 50"
4	Xavier Tondó (ESP)	Cervélo TestTeam	+ 50"
5	Nicolas Roche (IRL)	Ag2r–La Mondiale	+ 2' 11"
6	Fränk Schleck (LUX)	Team Saxo Bank	+ 2' 12"
7	Peter Velits (SVK)	Team HTC–Columbia	+ 2' 29"
8	Tom Danielson (USA)	Garmin–Transitions	+ 3' 29"
9	Rubén Plaza (ESP)	Caisse d'Epargne	+ 3' 41"
10	Carlos Sastre (ESP)	Cervélo TestTeam	+ 3' 52"

=== Stage 15 ===
12 September 2010 — Solares to Lagos de Covadonga, 187.3 km (116.4 mi)

Stage 15 result

	Rider	Team	Time
DSQ	~~Carlos Barredo (ESP)~~	Quick-Step	4h 33' 09"
2	Nico Sijmens (BEL)	Cofidis	+ 1' 07"
3	Martin Velits (SVK)	Team HTC–Columbia	+ 1' 43"
4	Greg Van Avermaet (BEL)	Omega Pharma–Lotto	+ 2' 06"
5	Pierre Cazaux (FRA)	FDJ	+ 2' 10"
6	Olivier Kaisen (BEL)	Omega Pharma–Lotto	+ 2' 12"
7	Ezequiel Mosquera (ESP)	Xacobeo–Galicia	+ 2' 15"
8	Vincenzo Nibali (ITA)	Liquigas–Doimo	+ 2' 26"
9	Peter Velits (SVK)	Team HTC–Columbia	+ 2' 26"
10	Joaquim Rodríguez (ESP)	Team Katusha	+ 2' 26"

General classification after stage 15

	Rider	Team	Time
1	Vincenzo Nibali (ITA)	Liquigas–Doimo	65h 31' 14"
2	Joaquim Rodríguez (ESP)	Team Katusha	+ 4"
3	Ezequiel Mosquera (ESP)	Xacobeo–Galicia	+ 39"
4	Peter Velits (SVK)	Team HTC–Columbia	+ 2' 29"
5	Xavier Tondó (ESP)	Cervélo TestTeam	+ 2' 30"
6	Nicolas Roche (IRL)	Ag2r–La Mondiale	+ 2' 43"
7	Fränk Schleck (LUX)	Team Saxo Bank	+ 2' 48"
8	Tom Danielson (USA)	Garmin–Transitions	+ 3' 48"
9	Carlos Sastre (ESP)	Cervélo TestTeam	+ 4' 29"
10	Vladimir Karpets (RUS)	Team Katusha	+ 5' 27"

=== Stage 16 ===
13 September 2010 — Gijón to Alto de Cotobello, 181.4 km (112.7 mi)

Stage 16 result

	Rider	Team	Time
1	Mikel Nieve (ESP)	Euskaltel–Euskadi	4h 51' 59"
2	Fränk Schleck (LUX)	Team Saxo Bank	+ 1' 06"
3	Kevin De Weert (BEL)	Quick-Step	+ 1' 08"
4	Joaquim Rodríguez (ESP)	Team Katusha	+ 1' 22"
5	Luis León Sánchez (ESP)	Caisse d'Epargne	+ 1' 32"
6	Ezequiel Mosquera (ESP)	Xacobeo–Galicia	+ 1' 40"
7	~~David García (ESP)~~	~~Xacobeo–Galicia~~	+ 1' 42"
8	Nicolas Roche (IRL)	Ag2r–La Mondiale	+ 1' 44"
9	Carlos Sastre (ESP)	Cervélo TestTeam	+ 1' 50"
10	Vincenzo Nibali (ITA)	Liquigas–Doimo	+ 1' 59"

General classification after stage 16

	Rider	Team	Time
1	Joaquim Rodríguez (ESP)	Team Katusha	70h 24' 39"
2	Vincenzo Nibali (ITA)	Liquigas–Doimo	+ 33"
3	Ezequiel Mosquera (ESP)	Xacobeo–Galicia	+ 53"
4	Fränk Schleck (LUX)	Team Saxo Bank	+ 2' 16"
5	Nicolas Roche (IRL)	Ag2r–La Mondiale	+ 3' 01"
6	Peter Velits (SVK)	Team HTC–Columbia	+ 4' 27"
7	Tom Danielson (USA)	Garmin–Transitions	+ 4' 29"
8	Xavier Tondó (ESP)	Cervélo TestTeam	+ 4' 43"
9	Carlos Sastre (ESP)	Cervélo TestTeam	+ 4' 53"
10	~~David García (ESP)~~	~~Xacobeo–Galicia~~	+ 6' 23"

=== Stage 17 ===
15 September 2010 — Peñafiel (ITT), 46 km (28.6 mi)

Stage 17 result

	Rider	Team	Time
1	Peter Velits (SVK)	Team HTC–Columbia	52' 43"
2	Denis Menchov (RUS)	Rabobank	+ 12"
3	Fabian Cancellara (SUI)	Team Saxo Bank	+ 37"
4	Gustav Larsson (SWE)	Team Saxo Bank	+ 50"
5	Luis León Sánchez (ESP)	Caisse d'Epargne	+ 1' 03"
6	Leif Hoste (BEL)	Omega Pharma–Lotto	+ 1' 07"
7	David Zabriskie (USA)	Garmin–Transitions	+ 1' 10"
DSQ	~~Carlos Barredo (ESP)~~	Quick-Step	+ 1' 14"
9	Philippe Gilbert (BEL)	Omega Pharma–Lotto	+ 1' 24"
10	David Millar (GBR)	Garmin–Transitions	+ 1' 27"

General classification after stage 17

	Rider	Team	Time
1	Vincenzo Nibali (ITA)	Liquigas–Doimo	71h 19' 50"
2	Ezequiel Mosquera (ESP)	Xacobeo–Galicia	+ 38"
3	Peter Velits (SVK)	Team HTC–Columbia	+ 1' 59"
4	Fränk Schleck (LUX)	Team Saxo Bank	+ 3' 43"
5	Joaquim Rodríguez (ESP)	Team Katusha	+ 3' 44"
6	Xavier Tondó (ESP)	Cervélo TestTeam	+ 3' 44"
7	Tom Danielson (USA)	Garmin–Transitions	+ 3' 54"
8	Nicolas Roche (IRL)	Ag2r–La Mondiale	+ 4' 02"
9	Carlos Sastre (ESP)	Cervélo TestTeam	+ 4' 12"
10	Luis León Sánchez (ESP)	Caisse d'Epargne	+ 5' 42"

=== Stage 18 ===
16 September 2010 — Valladolid to Salamanca, 148.9 km (92.5 mi)

Stage 18 result

	Rider	Team	Time
1	Mark Cavendish (GBR)	Team HTC–Columbia	3h 27' 11"
2	Juan José Haedo (ARG)	Team Saxo Bank	s.t.
3	Manuel Antonio Cardoso (POR)	Footon–Servetto–Fuji	s.t.
4	Tyler Farrar (USA)	Garmin–Transitions	s.t.
5	Samuel Dumoulin (FRA)	Cofidis	s.t.
6	Robert Förster (GER)	Team Milram	s.t.
7	Enrique Mata (ESP)	Footon–Servetto–Fuji	s.t.
8	Greg Van Avermaet (BEL)	Omega Pharma–Lotto	s.t.
9	Wouter Weylandt (BEL)	Quick-Step	s.t.
10	Danilo Hondo (GER)	Lampre–Farnese	s.t.

General classification after stage 18

	Rider	Team	Time
1	Vincenzo Nibali (ITA)	Liquigas–Doimo	74h 47' 06"
2	Ezequiel Mosquera (ESP)	Xacobeo–Galicia	+ 38"
3	Peter Velits (SVK)	Team HTC–Columbia	+ 1' 59"
4	Fränk Schleck (LUX)	Team Saxo Bank	+ 3' 43"
5	Joaquim Rodríguez (ESP)	Team Katusha	+ 3' 48"
6	Xavier Tondó (ESP)	Cervélo TestTeam	+ 3' 48"
7	Tom Danielson (USA)	Garmin–Transitions	+ 3' 58"
8	Nicolas Roche (IRL)	Ag2r–La Mondiale	+ 4' 02"
9	Carlos Sastre (ESP)	Cervélo TestTeam	+ 4' 16"
10	Luis León Sánchez (ESP)	Caisse d'Epargne	+ 5' 42"

=== Stage 19 ===
17 September 2010 — Piedrahíta to Toledo, 231.2 km (143.7 mi)

Stage 19 result

	Rider	Team	Time
1	Philippe Gilbert (BEL)	Omega Pharma–Lotto	5h 43' 41"
2	Tyler Farrar (USA)	Garmin–Transitions	s.t.
3	Filippo Pozzato (ITA)	Team Katusha	+ 1"
4	Sébastien Hinault (FRA)	Ag2r–La Mondiale	+ 1"
5	Peter Velits (SVK)	Team HTC–Columbia	+ 1"
6	Vincenzo Nibali (ITA)	Liquigas–Doimo	+ 1"
7	Nikolas Maes (BEL)	Quick-Step	+ 1"
8	Grega Bole (SLO)	Lampre–Farnese	+ 1"
9	Daniele Bennati (ITA)	Liquigas–Doimo	+ 1"
10	Paul Voss (GER)	Team Milram	+ 1"

General classification after stage 19

	Rider	Team	Time
1	Vincenzo Nibali (ITA)	Liquigas–Doimo	80h 30' 48"
2	Ezequiel Mosquera (ESP)	Xacobeo–Galicia	+ 50"
3	Peter Velits (SVK)	Team HTC–Columbia	+ 1' 59"
4	Joaquim Rodríguez (ESP)	Team Katusha	+ 3' 54"
5	Fränk Schleck (LUX)	Team Saxo Bank	+ 3' 57"
6	Xavier Tondó (ESP)	Cervélo TestTeam	+ 4' 02"
7	Nicolas Roche (IRL)	Ag2r–La Mondiale	+ 4' 10"
8	Tom Danielson (USA)	Garmin–Transitions	+ 4' 18"
9	Carlos Sastre (ESP)	Cervélo TestTeam	+ 4' 28"
10	Luis León Sánchez (ESP)	Caisse d'Epargne	+ 5' 50"

=== Stage 20 ===
18 September 2010 — San Martín de Valdeiglesias to Bola del Mundo, 172.1 km (106.9 mi)

Stage 20 result

	Rider	Team	Time
1	Ezequiel Mosquera (ESP)	Xacobeo–Galicia	4h 45' 28"
2	Vincenzo Nibali (ITA)	Liquigas–Doimo	+ 1"
3	Joaquim Rodríguez (ESP)	Team Katusha	+ 23"
4	Fränk Schleck (LUX)	Team Saxo Bank	+ 35"
5	Xavier Tondó (ESP)	Cervélo TestTeam	+ 39"
6	Nicolas Roche (IRL)	Ag2r–La Mondiale	+ 42"
7	Mikel Nieve (ESP)	Euskaltel–Euskadi	+ 50"
8	Peter Velits (SVK)	Team HTC–Columbia	+ 52"
9	Christophe Le Mével (FRA)	FDJ	+ 55"
10	Rémy Di Gregorio (FRA)	FDJ	+ 1' 00"

General classification after stage 20

	Rider	Team	Time
1	Vincenzo Nibali (ITA)	Liquigas–Doimo	85h 16' 05"
2	Ezequiel Mosquera (ESP)	Xacobeo–Galicia	+ 41"
3	Peter Velits (SVK)	Team HTC–Columbia	+ 3' 02"
4	Joaquim Rodríguez (ESP)	Team Katusha	+ 4' 20"
5	Fränk Schleck (LUX)	Team Saxo Bank	+ 4' 43"
6	Xavier Tondó (ESP)	Cervélo TestTeam	+ 4' 52"
7	Nicolas Roche (IRL)	Ag2r–La Mondiale	+ 5' 03"
8	Carlos Sastre (ESP)	Cervélo TestTeam	+ 6' 06"
9	Tom Danielson (USA)	Garmin–Transitions	+ 6' 09"
10	Luis León Sánchez (ESP)	Caisse d'Epargne	+ 7' 35"

=== Stage 21 ===
19 September 2010 — San Sebastián de los Reyes to Madrid, 85 km (52.8 mi)

Stage 21 result

	Rider	Team	Time
1	Tyler Farrar (USA)	Garmin–Transitions	2h 02' 24"
2	Mark Cavendish (GBR)	Team HTC–Columbia	s.t.
3	Allan Davis (AUS)	Astana	s.t.
4	Wouter Weylandt (BEL)	Quick-Step	s.t.
5	Matthew Goss (AUS)	Team HTC–Columbia	s.t.
6	Grega Bole (SLO)	Lampre–Farnese	s.t.
7	Manuel Antonio Cardoso (POR)	Footon–Servetto–Fuji	s.t.
8	Samuel Dumoulin (FRA)	Cofidis	s.t.
9	Juan José Haedo (ARG)	Team Saxo Bank	s.t.
10	Danilo Hondo (GER)	Lampre–Farnese	s.t.

Final General Classification

	Rider	Team	Time
1	Vincenzo Nibali (ITA)	Liquigas–Doimo	87h 18' 33"
2	Ezequiel Mosquera (ESP)	Xacobeo–Galicia	+ 41"
3	Peter Velits (SVK)	Team HTC–Columbia	+ 3' 02"
4	Joaquim Rodríguez (ESP)	Team Katusha	+ 4' 20"
5	Fränk Schleck (LUX)	Team Saxo Bank	+ 4' 43"
6	Xavier Tondó (ESP)	Cervélo TestTeam	+ 4' 52"
7	Nicolas Roche (IRL)	Ag2r–La Mondiale	+ 5' 03"
8	Carlos Sastre (ESP)	Cervélo TestTeam	+ 6' 06"
9	Tom Danielson (USA)	Garmin–Transitions	+ 6' 16"
10	Luis León Sánchez (ESP)	Caisse d'Epargne	+ 7' 42"
