= 2010 Vuelta a España, Stage 1 to Stage 11 =

Cycling race stages

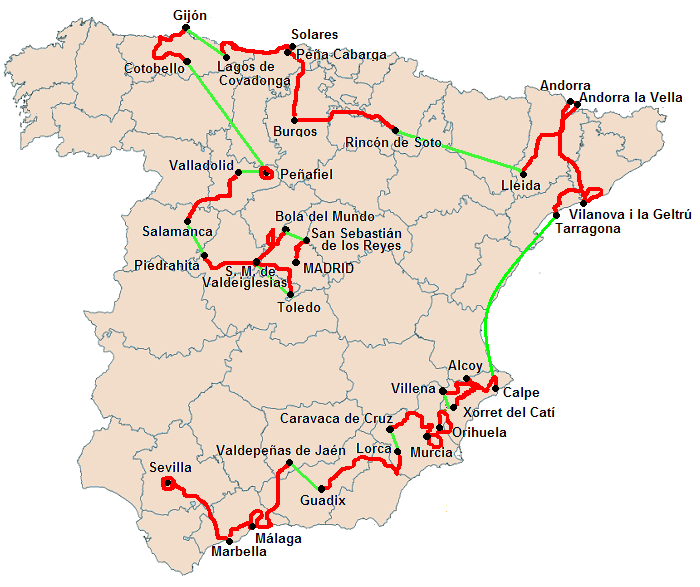
Overview of the stages

These are the individual stages of the 2010 Vuelta a España, with Stage 1 on 28 August and Stage 11 on 8 September.

== Stages ==
- s.t. indicates that the rider crossed the finish line in the same group as the one receiving the time above him, and was therefore credited with the same finishing time.

=== Stage 1 ===
28 August 2010 — Seville, 13 km (8.1 mi) (Team time trial)

The course for the team time trial is flat, and takes place under lighting: beginning at 10pm.

Stage 1 result

	Team	Time
1	Team HTC–Columbia	14' 06"
2	Liquigas–Doimo	+ 10"
3	Team Saxo Bank	+ 12"
4	Cervélo TestTeam	+ 13"
5	Lampre–Farnese	+ 14"
6	Garmin–Transitions	+ 17"
7	Omega Pharma–Lotto	+ 17"
8	Team Milram	+ 18"
9	Team Katusha	+ 20"
10	Quick-Step	+ 23"

General classification after stage 1

	Rider	Team	Time
1	Mark Cavendish (GBR)	Team HTC–Columbia	14' 06"
2	Peter Velits (SVK)	Team HTC–Columbia	+ 0"
3	Martin Velits (SVK)	Team HTC–Columbia	+ 0"
4	Lars Bak (DEN)	Team HTC–Columbia	+ 0"
5	Hayden Roulston (NZL)	Team HTC–Columbia	+ 0"
6	Kanstantsin Sivtsov (BLR)	Team HTC–Columbia	+ 0"
7	Tejay van Garderen (USA)	Team HTC–Columbia	+ 0"
8	Matthew Goss (AUS)	Team HTC–Columbia	+ 0"
9	Daniele Bennati (ITA)	Liquigas–Doimo	+ 10"
10	Frederik Willems (BEL)	Liquigas–Doimo	+ 10"

=== Stage 2 ===
29 August 2010 — Alcalá de Guadaíra to Marbella, 173.7 km (107.9 mi)

Stage 2 result

	Rider	Team	Time
1	Yauheni Hutarovich (BLR)	FDJ	4h 35' 41"
2	Mark Cavendish (GBR)	Team HTC–Columbia	s.t.
3	Tyler Farrar (USA)	Garmin–Transitions	s.t.
4	Alessandro Petacchi (ITA)	Lampre–Farnese	s.t.
5	Manuel Antonio Cardoso (POR)	Footon–Servetto–Fuji	s.t.
6	Koldo Fernández (ESP)	Euskaltel–Euskadi	s.t.
7	Ben Swift (GBR)	Team Sky	s.t.
8	Robert Förster (GER)	Team Milram	s.t.
9	Denis Galimzyanov (RUS)	Team Katusha	s.t.
10	Andreas Stauff (GER)	Quick-Step	s.t.

General classification after stage 2

	Rider	Team	Time
1	Mark Cavendish (GBR)	Team HTC–Columbia	4h 49' 35"
2	Kanstantsin Sivtsov (BLR)	Team HTC–Columbia	+ 12"
3	Peter Velits (SVK)	Team HTC–Columbia	+ 12"
4	Tejay van Garderen (USA)	Team HTC–Columbia	+ 12"
5	Matthew Goss (AUS)	Team HTC–Columbia	+ 12"
6	Lars Bak (DEN)	Team HTC–Columbia	+ 12"
7	Hayden Roulston (NZL)	Team HTC–Columbia	+ 12"
8	Tyler Farrar (USA)	Garmin–Transitions	+ 21"
9	Daniele Bennati (ITA)	Liquigas–Doimo	+ 22"
10	Vincenzo Nibali (ITA)	Liquigas–Doimo	+ 22"

=== Stage 3 ===
30 August 2010 — Marbella to Málaga, 157.3 km (97.7 mi)

Stage 3 result

	Rider	Team	Time
1	Philippe Gilbert (BEL)	Omega Pharma–Lotto	4h 06' 12"
2	Joaquim Rodríguez (ESP)	Team Katusha	+ 3"
3	Igor Antón (ESP)	Euskaltel–Euskadi	+ 13"
4	Vincenzo Nibali (ITA)	Liquigas–Doimo	+ 15"
5	Grega Bole (SLO)	Lampre–Farnese	+ 15"
6	Nicolas Roche (IRL)	Ag2r–La Mondiale	+ 15"
7	Denis Menchov (RUS)	Rabobank	+ 18"
8	Ezequiel Mosquera (ESP)	Xacobeo–Galicia	+ 19"
9	David Arroyo (ESP)	Caisse d'Epargne	+ 19"
10	Arthur Vichot (FRA)	FDJ	+ 19"

General classification after stage 3

	Rider	Team	Time
1	Philippe Gilbert (BEL)	Omega Pharma–Lotto	8h 55' 56"
2	Joaquim Rodríguez (ESP)	Team Katusha	+ 14"
3	Kanstantsin Sivtsov (BLR)	Team HTC–Columbia	+ 22"
4	Tejay van Garderen (USA)	Team HTC–Columbia	+ 26"
5	Vincenzo Nibali (ITA)	Liquigas–Doimo	+ 28"
6	Peter Velits (SVK)	Team HTC–Columbia	+ 28"
7	Igor Antón (ESP)	Euskaltel–Euskadi	+ 35"
8	Xavier Tondó (ESP)	Cervélo TestTeam	+ 35"
9	Fränk Schleck (LUX)	Team Saxo Bank	+ 36"
10	Xavier Florencio (ESP)	Cervélo TestTeam	+ 41"

=== Stage 4 ===
31 August 2010 — Málaga to Jaén, 183.8 km (114.2 mi)

Stage 4 result

	Rider	Team	Time
1	Igor Antón (ESP)	Euskaltel–Euskadi	5h 00' 29"
2	Vincenzo Nibali (ITA)	Liquigas–Doimo	+ 1"
3	Peter Velits (SVK)	Team HTC–Columbia	+ 1"
4	Joaquim Rodríguez (ESP)	Team Katusha	+ 1"
5	Philippe Gilbert (BEL)	Omega Pharma–Lotto	+ 5"
6	Tejay van Garderen (USA)	Team HTC–Columbia	+ 8"
7	Ezequiel Mosquera (ESP)	Xacobeo–Galicia	+ 12"
8	Nicolas Roche (IRE)	Ag2r–La Mondiale	+ 12"
9	Rubén Plaza (ESP)	Caisse d'Epargne	+ 12"
10	Rigoberto Urán (COL)	Caisse d'Epargne	+ 19"

General classification after stage 4

	Rider	Team	Time
1	Philippe Gilbert (BEL)	Omega Pharma–Lotto	13h 56' 30"
2	Igor Antón (ESP)	Euskaltel–Euskadi	+ 10"
3	Joaquim Rodríguez (ESP)	Team Katusha	+ 10"
4	Vincenzo Nibali (ITA)	Liquigas–Doimo	+ 12"
5	Peter Velits (SVK)	Team HTC–Columbia	+ 16"
6	Tejay van Garderen (USA)	Team HTC–Columbia	+ 29"
7	Xavier Tondó (ESP)	Cervélo TestTeam	+ 49"
8	Fränk Schleck (LUX)	Team Saxo Bank	+ 50"
9	Rubén Plaza (ESP)	Caisse d'Epargne	+ 54"
10	Ezequiel Mosquera (ESP)	Xacobeo–Galicia	+ 55"

=== Stage 5 ===
1 September 2010 — Guadix to Lorca, 198.8 km (123.5 mi)

Stage 5 result

	Rider	Team	Time
1	Tyler Farrar (USA)	Garmin–Transitions	5h 03' 36"
2	Koldo Fernández (ESP)	Euskaltel–Euskadi	s.t.
3	Mark Cavendish (GBR)	Team HTC–Columbia	s.t.
4	Wouter Weylandt (BEL)	Quick-Step	s.t.
5	Alessandro Petacchi (ITA)	Lampre–Farnese	s.t.
6	Sébastien Chavanel (FRA)	FDJ	s.t.
7	Robert Förster (GER)	Team Milram	s.t.
8	Denis Galimzyanov (RUS)	Team Katusha	s.t.
9	Theo Bos (NED)	Cervélo TestTeam	s.t.
10	Greg Van Avermaet (BEL)	Omega Pharma–Lotto	s.t.

General classification after stage 5

	Rider	Team	Time
1	Philippe Gilbert (BEL)	Omega Pharma–Lotto	19h 00' 06"
2	Igor Antón (ESP)	Euskaltel–Euskadi	+ 10"
3	Joaquim Rodríguez (ESP)	Team Katusha	+ 10"
4	Vincenzo Nibali (ITA)	Liquigas–Doimo	+ 12"
5	Peter Velits (SVK)	Team HTC–Columbia	+ 16"
6	Tejay van Garderen (USA)	Team HTC–Columbia	+ 29"
7	Xavier Tondó (ESP)	Cervélo TestTeam	+ 49"
8	Fränk Schleck (LUX)	Team Saxo Bank	+ 50"
9	Rubén Plaza (ESP)	Caisse d'Epargne	+ 54"
10	Ezequiel Mosquera (ESP)	Xacobeo–Galicia	+ 55"

=== Stage 6 ===
2 September 2010 — Caravaca de la Cruz to Murcia, 151 km (93.8 mi)

Stage 6 result

	Rider	Team	Time
1	Thor Hushovd (NOR)	Cervélo TestTeam	3h 36' 20"
2	Daniele Bennati (ITA)	Liquigas–Doimo	s.t.
3	Grega Bole (SLO)	Lampre–Farnese	s.t.
4	Allan Davis (AUS)	Astana	s.t.
5	Filippo Pozzato (ITA)	Team Katusha	s.t.
6	Philippe Gilbert (BEL)	Omega Pharma–Lotto	s.t.
7	Peter Velits (SVK)	Team HTC–Columbia	s.t.
8	Pablo Urtasun (ESP)	Euskaltel–Euskadi	s.t.
9	Samuel Dumoulin (FRA)	Cofidis	s.t.
10	Nicolas Roche (IRL)	Ag2r–La Mondiale	s.t.

General classification after stage 6

	Rider	Team	Time
1	Philippe Gilbert (BEL)	Omega Pharma–Lotto	22h 36' 26"
2	Igor Antón (ESP)	Euskaltel–Euskadi	+ 10"
3	Joaquim Rodríguez (ESP)	Team Katusha	+ 10"
4	Vincenzo Nibali (ITA)	Liquigas–Doimo	+ 12"
5	Peter Velits (SVK)	Team HTC–Columbia	+ 16"
6	Tejay van Garderen (USA)	Team HTC–Columbia	+ 29"
7	Xavier Tondó (ESP)	Cervélo TestTeam	+ 49"
8	Fränk Schleck (LUX)	Team Saxo Bank	+ 50"
9	Rubén Plaza (ESP)	Caisse d'Epargne	+ 54"
10	Ezequiel Mosquera (ESP)	Xacobeo–Galicia	+ 55"

=== Stage 7 ===
3 September 2010 — Murcia to Orihuela, 187.1 km (116.3 mi)

Stage 7 result

	Rider	Team	Time
1	Alessandro Petacchi (ITA)	Lampre–Farnese	4h 36' 12"
2	Mark Cavendish (GBR)	Team HTC–Columbia	s.t.
3	Juan José Haedo (ARG)	Team Saxo Bank	s.t.
4	Andreas Stauff (GER)	Quick-Step	s.t.
5	Tyler Farrar (USA)	Garmin–Transitions	s.t.
6	Denis Galimzyanov (RUS)	Team Katusha	s.t.
7	Robert Förster (GER)	Team Milram	s.t.
8	Sébastien Hinault (FRA)	Ag2r–La Mondiale	s.t.
9	Daniele Bennati (ITA)	Liquigas–Doimo	s.t.
10	Wouter Weylandt (BEL)	Quick-Step	s.t.

General classification after stage 7

	Rider	Team	Time
1	Philippe Gilbert (BEL)	Omega Pharma–Lotto	27h 12' 38"
2	Igor Antón (ESP)	Euskaltel–Euskadi	+ 10"
3	Joaquim Rodríguez (ESP)	Team Katusha	+ 10"
4	Vincenzo Nibali (ITA)	Liquigas–Doimo	+ 12"
5	Peter Velits (SVK)	Team HTC–Columbia	+ 16"
6	Tejay van Garderen (USA)	Team HTC–Columbia	+ 29"
7	Xavier Tondó (ESP)	Cervélo TestTeam	+ 49"
8	Fränk Schleck (LUX)	Team Saxo Bank	+ 50"
9	Rubén Plaza (ESP)	Caisse d'Epargne	+ 54"
10	Ezequiel Mosquera (ESP)	Xacobeo–Galicia	+ 55"

=== Stage 8 ===
4 September 2010 — Villena to Xorret de Catí, 190 km (118.1 mi)

Stage 8 result

	Rider	Team	Time
1	David Moncoutié (FRA)	Cofidis	5h 14' 32"
2	Serafín Martínez (ESP)	Xacobeo–Galicia	+ 54"
3	Johann Tschopp (SUI)	Bbox Bouygues Telecom	+ 54"
4	José Luis Arrieta (ESP)	Ag2r–La Mondiale	+ 54"
5	Joaquim Rodríguez (ESP)	Team Katusha	+ 1' 29"
6	Vincenzo Nibali (ITA)	Liquigas–Doimo	+ 1' 29"
7	Igor Antón (ESP)	Euskaltel–Euskadi	+ 1' 29"
8	Assan Bazayev (KAZ)	Astana	+ 1' 32"
9	Xavier Tondó (ESP)	Cervélo TestTeam	+ 1' 32"
10	Carlos Sastre (ESP)	Cervélo TestTeam	+ 1' 35"

General classification after stage 8

	Rider	Team	Time
1	Igor Antón (ESP)	Euskaltel–Euskadi	32h 28' 49"
2	Joaquim Rodríguez (ESP)	Team Katusha	+ 0"
3	Vincenzo Nibali (ITA)	Liquigas–Doimo	+ 2"
4	Xavier Tondó (ESP)	Cervélo TestTeam	+ 42"
5	Rubén Plaza (ESP)	Caisse d'Epargne	+ 1' 15"
6	Ezequiel Mosquera (ESP)	Xacobeo–Galicia	+ 1' 18"
7	Nicolas Roche (IRL)	Ag2r–La Mondiale	+ 1' 19"
8	Marzio Bruseghin (ITA)	Caisse d'Epargne	+ 1' 22"
9	Peter Velits (SVK)	Team HTC–Columbia	+ 1' 26"
10	Tejay van Garderen (USA)	Team HTC–Columbia	+ 1' 26"

=== Stage 9 ===
5 September 2010 — Calpe to Alcoy, 187.7 km (116.6 mi)

Stage 9 result

	Rider	Team	Time
1	David López (ESP)	Caisse d'Epargne	5h 20' 51"
2	Roman Kreuziger (CZE)	Liquigas–Doimo	+ 6"
3	Giampaolo Caruso (ITA)	Team Katusha	+ 13"
4	David Moncoutié (FRA)	Cofidis	+ 21"
5	Blel Kadri (FRA)	Ag2r–La Mondiale	+ 27"
6	Egoi Martínez (ESP)	Euskaltel–Euskadi	+ 30"
7	Jean-Christophe Péraud (FRA)	Omega Pharma–Lotto	+ 55"
8	Gonzalo Rabuñal (ESP)	Xacobeo–Galicia	+ 2' 36"
9	Óscar Pujol (ESP)	Cervélo TestTeam	+ 3' 52"
10	Jelle Vanendert (BEL)	Omega Pharma–Lotto	+ 4' 17"

General classification after stage 9

	Rider	Team	Time
1	Igor Antón (ESP)	Euskaltel–Euskadi	37h 56' 42"
2	Joaquim Rodríguez (ESP)	Team Katusha	+ 0"
3	Vincenzo Nibali (ITA)	Liquigas–Doimo	+ 2"
4	Xavier Tondó (ESP)	Cervélo TestTeam	+ 42"
5	Jean-Christophe Péraud (FRA)	Omega Pharma–Lotto	+ 52"
6	Rubén Plaza (ESP)	Caisse d'Epargne	+ 1' 15"
7	Ezequiel Mosquera (ESP)	Xacobeo–Galicia	+ 1' 18"
8	Nicolas Roche (IRL)	Ag2r–La Mondiale	+ 1' 19"
9	Marzio Bruseghin (ITA)	Caisse d'Epargne	+ 1' 22"
10	Peter Velits (SVK)	Team HTC–Columbia	+ 1' 26"

=== Stage 10 ===
7 September 2010 — Tarragona to Vilanova i la Geltrú, 175.7 km (109.2 mi)

Stage 10 result

	Rider	Team	Time
1	Imanol Erviti (ESP)	Caisse d'Epargne	4h 13' 31"
2	Romain Zingle (BEL)	Cofidis	+ 37"
3	Greg Van Avermaet (BEL)	Omega Pharma–Lotto	+ 37"
4	Mauro Finetto (ITA)	Liquigas–Doimo	+ 37"
5	Javier Moreno (ESP)	Andalucía–Cajasur	+ 37"
6	Anders Lund (DEN)	Team Saxo Bank	+ 37"
7	Christophe Le Mével (FRA)	FDJ	+ 37"
8	Giampaolo Cheula (ITA)	Footon–Servetto–Fuji	+ 37"
9	Laurens ten Dam (NED)	Rabobank	+ 42"
10	Dmitry Fofonov (KAZ)	Astana	+ 1' 36"

General classification after stage 10

	Rider	Team	Time
1	Joaquim Rodríguez (ESP)	Team Katusha	42h 11' 49"
2	Igor Antón (ESP)	Euskaltel–Euskadi	+ 2"
3	Vincenzo Nibali (ITA)	Liquigas–Doimo	+ 4"
4	Xavier Tondó (ESP)	Cervélo TestTeam	+ 44"
5	Jean-Christophe Péraud (FRA)	Omega Pharma–Lotto	+ 54"
6	Rubén Plaza (ESP)	Caisse d'Epargne	+ 1' 17"
7	Ezequiel Mosquera (ESP)	Xacobeo–Galicia	+ 1' 20"
8	Nicolas Roche (IRL)	Ag2r–La Mondiale	+ 1' 21"
9	Marzio Bruseghin (ITA)	Caisse d'Epargne	+ 1' 24"
10	Peter Velits (SVK)	Team HTC–Columbia	+ 1' 28"

=== Stage 11 ===
8 September 2010 — Vilanova i la Geltrú to Vallnord (Andorra), 208.4 km (129.5 mi)

Stage 11 result

	Rider	Team	Time
1	Igor Antón (ESP)	Euskaltel–Euskadi	5h 25' 44"
2	Ezequiel Mosquera (ESP)	Xacobeo–Galicia	+ 3"
3	Xavier Tondó (ESP)	Cervélo TestTeam	+ 10"
4	Marzio Bruseghin (ITA)	Caisse d'Epargne	+ 15"
5	Rigoberto Urán (COL)	Caisse d'Epargne	+ 15"
6	Vincenzo Nibali (ITA)	Liquigas–Doimo	+ 23"
7	Fränk Schleck (LUX)	Team Saxo Bank	+ 23"
8	David Moncoutié (FRA)	Cofidis	+ 23"
9	Íñigo Cuesta (ESP)	Cervélo TestTeam	+ 32"
10	Carlos Sastre (ESP)	Cervélo TestTeam	+ 32"

General classification after stage 11

	Rider	Team	Time
1	Igor Antón (ESP)	Euskaltel–Euskadi	47h 37' 15"
2	Vincenzo Nibali (ITA)	Liquigas–Doimo	+ 45"
3	Xavier Tondó (ESP)	Cervélo TestTeam	+ 1' 04"
4	Joaquim Rodríguez (ESP)	Team Katusha	+ 1' 17"
5	Ezequiel Mosquera (ESP)	Xacobeo–Galicia	+ 1' 29"
6	Marzio Bruseghin (ITA)	Caisse d'Epargne	+ 1' 57"
7	Rubén Plaza (ESP)	Caisse d'Epargne	+ 2' 07"
8	Rigoberto Urán (COL)	Caisse d'Epargne	+ 2' 13"
9	Nicolas Roche (IRL)	Ag2r–La Mondiale	+ 2' 30"
10	Fränk Schleck (LUX)	Team Saxo Bank	+ 2' 30"
