= 2010 Cofidis season =

Cofidis
- 2010 season
- UCI code: COF
- Status: UCI Professional Continental
- Manager: Éric Boyer
- Main sponsor(s): Cofidis
- Based: France

Season victories
- One-day races: 5
- Stage race overall: 4
- Stage race stages: 12
- National Championships: 1
- Most wins: Samuel Dumoulin (6 wins)

The 2010 season for Cofidis began in January with La Tropicale Amissa Bongo and ended in October at the Giro di Lombardia. It was the team's first season as a UCI Professional Continental team, after being relegated from UCI ProTour status after the 2009 season. The team had been part of the ProTour since the ProTour's inception in 2005. The team carries wildcard status in 2010, meaning they are eligible to be invited to any ProTour event should the organizers wish to include them.

The team's manager is former cyclist Éric Boyer, who has led the team since 2005.

== 2010 roster ==
Ages as of 1 January 2010.

Rider	Date of birth
Stéphane Augé (FRA)	6 December 1974 (aged 35)
Guillaume Blot (FRA)	28 March 1985 (aged 24)
Mickaël Buffaz (FRA)	21 May 1979 (aged 30)
Rémi Cusin (FRA)	3 February 1986 (aged 23)
Samuel Dumoulin (FRA)	20 August 1980 (aged 29)
Leonardo Duque (COL)	10 April 1980 (aged 29)
Julien El Fares (FRA)	1 June 1985 (aged 24)
Jean Eudes Demaret (FRA)	25 July 1984 (aged 25)
Julien Fouchard (FRA)	20 June 1986 (aged 23)
Tony Gallopin (FRA)	24 May 1988 (aged 21)
Kevyn Ista (FRA)	22 November 1984 (aged 25)
Christophe Kern (FRA)	18 January 1981 (aged 28)

Rider	Date of birth
Jens Keukeleire (BEL)	23 November 1988 (aged 21)
Kalle Kriit (EST)	13 November 1983 (aged 26)
Arnaud Labbe (FRA)	3 November 1976 (aged 33)
Sébastien Minard (FRA)	12 June 1982 (aged 27)
Amaël Moinard (FRA)	2 February 1982 (aged 27)
David Moncoutié (FRA)	30 April 1975 (aged 34)
Damien Monier (FRA)	27 August 1982 (aged 27)
Rémi Pauriol (FRA)	4 April 1982 (aged 27)
Nico Sijmens (BEL)	1 April 1978 (aged 31)
Rein Taaramäe (EST)	24 April 1987 (aged 22)
Tristan Valentin (FRA)	23 February 1982 (aged 27)
Romain Zingle (BEL)	29 January 1987 (aged 22)

Riders who joined the team for the 2010 season

Rider	2009 team
Rémi Cusin	Agritubel
Julien Fouchard	neo-pro
Tony Gallopin	Auber 93
Kevyn Ista	Agritubel
Jens Keukeleire	Soenens–Yawadoo–Germond
Kalle Kriit	ex-pro (Mitsubishi–Jartazi, 2008)
Arnaud Labbe	Bbox Bouygues Telecom
Romain Zingle	Verandas Willems

Riders who left the team during or after the 2009 season

Rider	2010 team
Alexandre Blain	Endura Racing
Florent Brard	Retired
Hervé Duclos-Lassalle	No contract
Bingen Fernández	Retired
Maryan Hary	No contract
Sébastien Portal	No contract
Alexandre Usov	ISD feeder team
Romain Villa	No contract

== One-day races ==
=== Spring classics ===
The team was successful on the traditional opening weekend of the spring season. At the Gran Premio dell'Insubria-Lugano in Switzerland, Dumoulin was the strongest sprinter in the 11-man leading group that approached the finish line together, and easily took the win. Keukeleire provided a similar win in Belgium at Le Samyn later in the week, winning a 25-man sprint.

== Stage races ==
Cofidis' season began in Africa, in the nation of Gabon, with La Tropicale Amissa Bongo. Dumoulin quickly gave the team its first victory of the year, winning the sprint finish to the event's first stage. The following month, at the Étoile de Bessèges, Dumoulin again took a sprint stage win, in that event's third stage. The next day, Dumoulin crossed the line first in another mass finish, but he was relegated by the race jury to the last position in the peloton, 74th, for illegal maneuvering. The penalty cost him not only a stage win but also, as he lost out on time bonuses that went with the stage win, the race's overall leadership. The race concluded the next day. Due to a contagious stomach bug spreading through the peloton that kept more than a quarter of the riders in the race from finishing it, Dumoulin ended up winning the race's general classification after all, as previous race leader Arnaud Molmy was among those who went out sick. New team member Keukeleire was impressive in early March, winning the opening stage and the general classification of Driedaagse van West-Vlaanderen.

== Grand Tours ==
=== Giro d'Italia ===
Cofidis was one of 22 teams in the Giro, taking their guaranteed place in the race after they had declined it in 2009. Moncoutié and Duque were named as co-squad leaders, with aims for stage wins in the mountains and the flats respectively. It was Moncoutié's first career Giro, and Duque's second. The squad was not competitive in the stages in the Netherlands which began the Giro. They did not have any riders contesting the sprint finishes to the Giro's first two road race stages, and before the first rest day and the transfer to Italy their highest-placed rider in the overall classification was Duque in 75th, over eight and a half minutes behind the race leader. Moncoutié was seventh from last, already 16 minutes down in the standings due to being caught up in the repeated crashes that marred the first two days of mass-start racing. The squad's fortunes changed little upon the arrival in Italy, as they were 20th in the stage 4 team time trial, better than only Acqua & Sapone and Ag2r–La Mondiale at two and a half minutes off the winning time.

In stage 5, Fouchard followed a morning move from Bbox Bouygues Telecom's Yukiya Arashiro to join a breakaway group. Fouchard, Arashiro, and eventual stage winner Jérôme Pineau were nearly caught by the sprinters' teams driving the peloton in the final kilometer, but they stayed away by a margin of four seconds. They were credited by Team HTC–Columbia sporting director Valerio Piva, whose team was arguably the most upset by the lost mass sprint opportunity, for their combative riding. The squad was then quiet until stage 10, when the Garmin–Transitions leadout train, and in particular Julian Dean, rode so effectively that a group of only nine riders contested the sprint for the stage win three seconds ahead of the peloton. Duque made this selection, but was last in the sprint for victory behind Garmin–Transitions' Tyler Farrar.

The squad had better chances for victories in breakaways during the second half of the Giro. A large morning breakaway finished mostly intact in stage 13. Kriit was part of this group, and was fifth in the sprint finish. In stage 17, the squad took their only victory of the Giro with Monier, from a breakaway. He had ridden the first part of the stage-concluding climb to Pejo Terme with Danilo Hondo and Steven Kruijswijk before soloing to his first professional victory half a minute ahead of them. The team did not contend for any overall awards; Duque was the squad's highest-placed rider in the final overall standings in 63rd, and the squad was 20th in both the Trofeo Fast Team and Trofeo Super Team standings.

=== Tour de France ===
Cofidis was extremely unsuccessful in the Tour de France, finishing in the top ten of a stage just once, when Pauriol finished 22 seconds ahead of the main field for eighth in stage 10. El Farès was the team's top rider in the general classification at the end of the race, more than 53 minutes behind Tour champion Alberto Contador in 27th place. The squad was 13th in the teams classification.

=== Vuelta a España ===
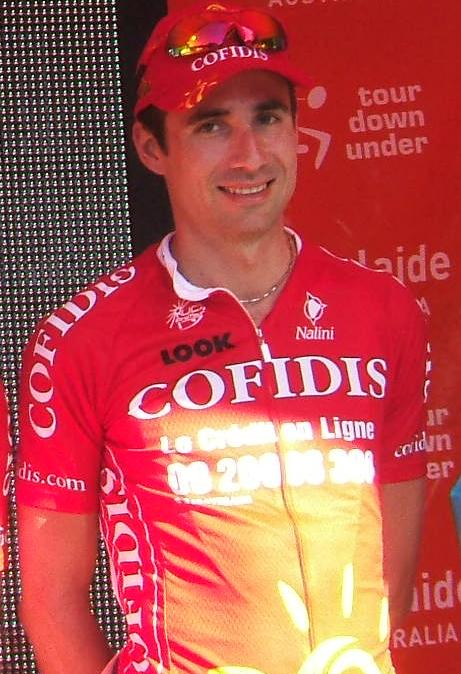
David Moncoutié came to the Vuelta hoping to win the mountains classification for the third consecutive year, and did so.

Cofidis came to the Vuelta with a squad led by Moncoutié, two-time defending mountains classification winner who was back to try for a third straight win in the classification. The squad was 15th in the team time trial which kicked off the race, finishing with eight riders 28 seconds off the winning time put up by Team HTC–Columbia. The squad did not come close to figuring into any stage finishes until stage 6, when Dumoulin was ninth in a depleted field sprint. Two days later, Moncoutié began his pursuit of the mountains title in earnest. He made the morning breakaway on a hilly stage with five categorized climbs, including a steep summit finish at Xorret de Catí. While mountains leader Serafín Martínez also made the escape and actually outscored Moncoutié on the day 23–20, Moncoutié won the stage and positioned himself second in the mountains standings. It was his third Vuelta stage win in as many consecutive participations. He made the breakaway the next day as well, and scored on all seven climbs, moving past Martínez to claim the blue polka-dotted jersey awarded to the mountains leader. He was fourth on the stage, opting not to chase David López as the Spaniard rode an aggressive descent of the Alto de Revolcat to the finish.

Stage 11 ended with a climb to Vallnord in Andorra, and though Moncoutié rode the climb near the front of the race with the Vuelta's elite riders, he did not score any points on it, finishing eighth on the day. Moncoutié next scored mountains points on the Alto de Cotobello at the end of stage 14. Moncoutié took fourth place on the stage and widened his gap over Martínez, who had not scored since he lost the jersey. The next day, Sijmens took second place at Lagos de Covadonga in an extremely climbing-intensive stage. He had been part of the morning breakaway group, but lost contact with stage winner Carlos Barredo during the Covadonga climb. Moncoutié was briefly part of the breakaway in stage 17, taking top points on the third-category Alto de la Cabruñana climb near the beginning of the stage. After he gained those points, he rejoined the peloton, finishing the stage 12th. Martínez marked this move and scored in the classification for the first time since losing the blue and white jersey, coming just behind Moncoutié on the Cabruñana climb. They both scored on the second-category Puerto de Chía climb in stage 19, Martínez with five points to Moncoutié's three, but Moncoutié still led the classification by eight points with just one stage left (since stage 21 had no climbs). Both failed to score in the race's queen stage the next day, with the first three mountains being claimed by breakaway riders and the Bola del Mundo climb at the finish by the race's elite. This meant that Moncoutié needed only to finish the race the next day in Madrid to win the classification, and he did. He was also the squad's highest-placed rider in the final overall standings, finishing 14th at a deficit of 14 minutes and 34 seconds to Vuelta champion Vincenzo Nibali. The squad finished 15th in the teams classification.

== Season victories ==
Date	Race	Competition	Rider	Country	Location
January 19	La Tropicale Amissa Bongo, Stage 1	UCI Africa Tour	Samuel Dumoulin (FRA)	Gabon	Akiéni
February 5	Étoile de Bessèges, Stage 3	UCI Europe Tour	Samuel Dumoulin (FRA)	France	Ceze-Languedoc
February 7	Étoile de Bessèges, Overall	UCI Europe Tour	Samuel Dumoulin (FRA)	France	
February 13	Tour Méditerranéen, Stage 4	UCI Europe Tour	Julien El Fares (FRA)	France	St. Paul en Forêt
February 27	Gran Premio dell'Insubria-Lugano	UCI Europe Tour	Samuel Dumoulin (FRA)	Switzerland	Lugano
March 3	Le Samyn	UCI Europe Tour	Jens Keukeleire (BEL)	Belgium	Dour
March 5	Driedaagse van West-Vlaanderen, Stage 1	UCI Europe Tour	Jens Keukeleire (BEL)	Belgium	Bellegem
March 7	Driedaagse van West-Vlaanderen, Overall	UCI Europe Tour	Jens Keukeleire (BEL)	Belgium	
March 7	Driedaagse van West-Vlaanderen, Points classification	UCI Europe Tour	Jens Keukeleire (BEL)	Belgium	
March 7	Driedaagse van West-Vlaanderen, Youth classification	UCI Europe Tour	Jens Keukeleire (BEL)	Belgium	
March 14	Paris–Nice, Stage 7	UCI World Ranking	Amaël Moinard (FRA)	France	Nice
March 14	Paris–Nice, Mountains classification	UCI World Ranking	Amaël Moinard (FRA)	France	
March 17	Nokere–Koerse	UCI Europe Tour	Jens Keukeleire (BEL)	Belgium	
March 21	Cholet-Pays de Loire	UCI Europe Tour	Leonardo Duque (COL)	France	Pays de Loire
March 27	Volta a Catalunya, Stage 6	UCI ProTour	Samuel Dumoulin (FRA)	Spain	Barcelona
April 8	Circuit Cycliste Sarthe, Stage 3	UCI Europe Tour	Samuel Dumoulin (FRA)	France	Pre-En-Pail
April 13	Paris–Camembert	UCI Europe Tour	Sébastien Minard (FRA)	France	Camembert
April 18	Presidential Cycling Tour of Turkey, Mountains classification	UCI Europe Tour	Rémi Pauriol (FRA)	Turkey	
April 18	Presidential Cycling Tour of Turkey, Sprint classification	UCI Europe Tour	Christophe Kern (FRA)	Turkey	
May 26	Giro d'Italia, Stage 17	UCI World Ranking	Damien Monier (FRA)	Italy	Pejo Terme
June 5	Tour de Luxembourg, Stage 3	UCI Europe Tour	Tony Gallopin (FRA)	Luxembourg	Diekirch
June 19	Route du Sud, Stage 2B	UCI Europe Tour	David Moncoutié (FRA)	France	Peyragudes
June 20	Route du Sud, Overall	UCI Europe Tour	David Moncoutié (FRA)	France	
August 4	Paris–Corrèze, Stage 1	UCI Europe Tour	Mickaël Buffaz (FRA)	France	St Léonard de Noblat
August 5	Paris–Corrèze, Overall	UCI Europe Tour	Mickaël Buffaz (FRA)	France	
September 4	Vuelta a España, Stage 8	UCI World Ranking	David Moncoutié (FRA)	Spain	Xorret del Catí
September 19	Vuelta a España, Mountains classification	UCI World Ranking	David Moncoutié (FRA)	Spain	

== National, Continental and World champions ==
Date	Discipline	Jersey	Rider	Country	Location
June 27	Estonian National Road Race Champion		Kalle Kriit (EST)	Estonia	
