= 2011 Vuelta a Castilla y León =

Race details
- Dates: 13–17 April 2011
- Stages: 5
- Distance: 728.5 km (452.7 mi)
- Winning time: 17h 01' 40"

Results
Jersey awarded to the overall winner	Winner	Xavier Tondo (ESP)	(Movistar Team)
	Second	Bauke Mollema (NED)	(Rabobank)
	Third	Igor Antón (ESP)	(Euskaltel–Euskadi)
Jersey awarded to the points classification winner	Points	Francisco Ventoso (ESP)	(Movistar Team)
Jersey awarded to the mountains classification winner	Mountains	Raúl Alarcón (ESP)	(Barbot–Efapel)
	Combination	Bauke Mollema (NED)	(Rabobank)
	Team	(Netherlands) Rabobank Cycling Team	

The 2011 Vuelta a Castilla y León was the 26th edition of the Vuelta a Castilla y León cycle race and was held on 13 April to 17 April 2011. The race started in Medina de Rioseco and finished in Medina del Campo. The race was won by Xavier Tondo.

== General classification ==
Final general classification

Rank	Rider	Time
1	Xavier Tondo (ESP)	17h 01' 40"
2	Bauke Mollema (NED)	+ 9"
3	Igor Antón (ESP)	+ 17"
4	Domenico Pozzovivo (ITA)	+ 40"
5	Jérôme Coppel (FRA)	+ 47"
6	Juan Pablo Suárez (COL)	+ 47"
7	Dario Cioni (ITA)	+ 54"
8	Ricardo García Ambroa (ESP)	+ 58"
9	Juan Manuel Gárate (ESP)	+ 59"
10	Laurens ten Dam (NED)	+ 1' 16"
