= Juan Javier Estrada =

Spanish cyclist (born 1981)

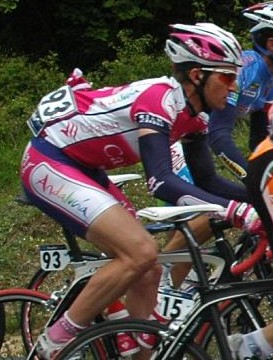

Personal information
- Full name: Juan Javier Estrada Ruiz
- Born: 8 August 1981 (age 45) Chiclana de la Frontera, Spain

Cycling career
- Sport: Cycling
- Discipline: Road
- Role: Rider

Professional team
- 2008-2011: Andalucía–CajaSur

Juan Javier Estrada Ruiz (born 8 August 1981, in Chiclana de la Frontera) is a Spanish former professional road racing cyclist. He rode in the 2008 and 2010 Vuelta a España.
