= Sergio Carrasco =

Spanish cyclist (born 1985)

Personal information
- Full name: Sergio Carrasco García
- Born: 17 February 1985 (age 41) Puerto Serrano, Spain

Cycling career
- Sport: Cycling
- Discipline: Road
- Role: Rider

Professional team
- 2009-2012: Andalucía
- 2013: Tusnad Cycling Team

Sergio Carrasco García (born 17 February 1985 in Puerto Serrano) is a Spanish former professional road racing cyclist. He rode in the 2010 and 2012 editions of the Vuelta a España.

== Palmarès ==
2009
3rd Vuelta a Vizcaya
3rd Clásica de Pascua CC Padrones
