= Enrique Mata =

Spanish cyclist

Personal information
- Full name: Enrique Mata Cabello
- Born: 15 June 1985 (age 41) Burgos, Spain

Cycling career
- Sport: Cycling
- Discipline: Road
- Role: Rider

Professional teams
- 2007–2009: Burgos Monumental
- 2010: Saunier Duval–Prodir

Enrique Mata Cabello (born 15 June 1985 in Burgos) is a Spanish cyclist. He rode in the 2010 Vuelta a España and finished in 121st place.

== Palmarès ==
2005
1st Stage 2 Vuelta a Navarra
2008
3rd Circuito de Getxo
2010
6th Circuito de Getxo
8th Vattenfall Cyclassics
