= Andreas Stauff =

German road bicycle racer

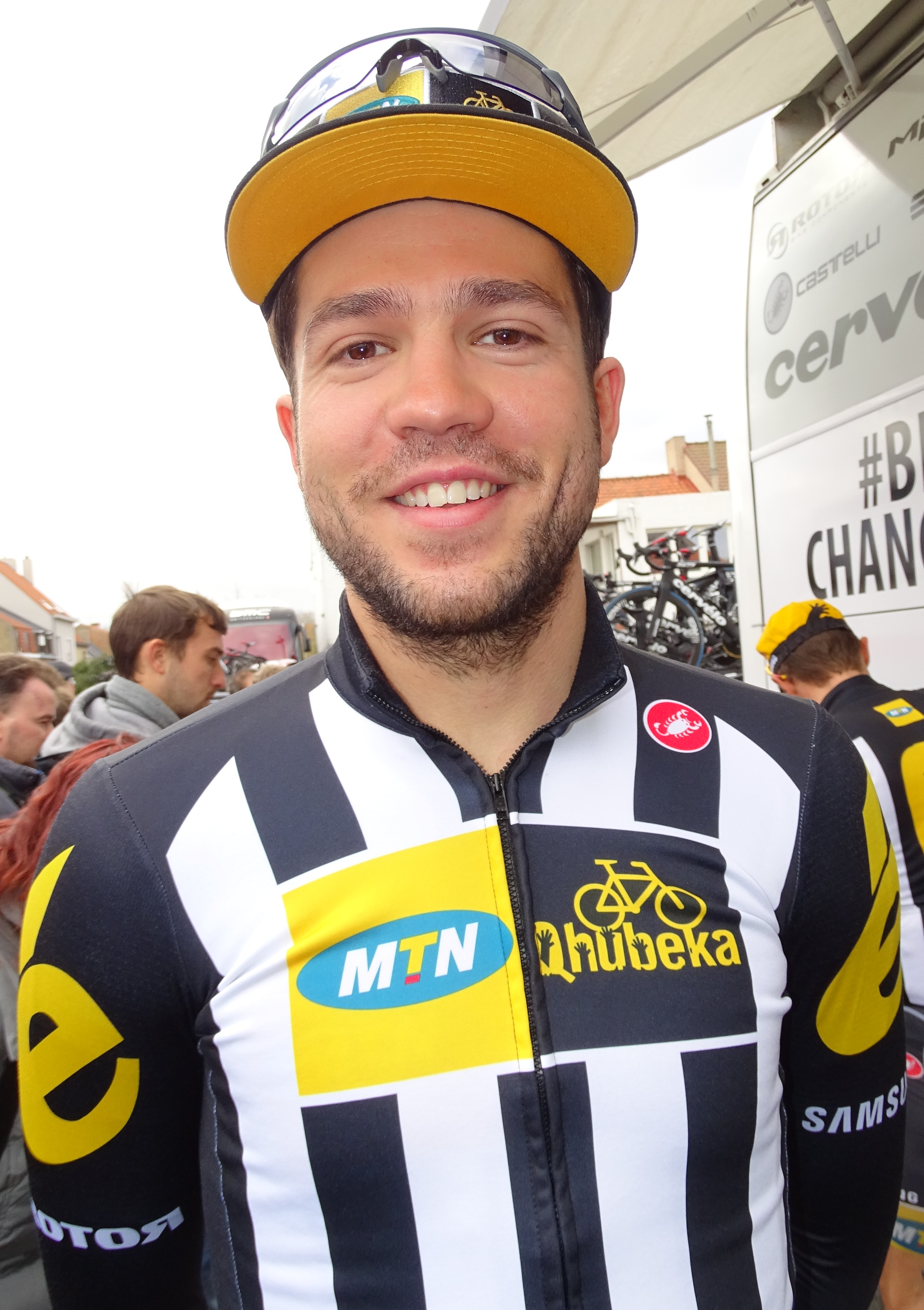
- Stauff in 2015

Personal information
- Full name: Andreas Stauff
- Born: 22 January 1987 (age 39) Frechen, Germany

Cycling career
- Sport: Cycling
- Current team: Team Lotto–Kern Haus Outlet Montabaur
- Discipline: Road
- Role: Rider (retired); Directeur sportif

Professional teams
- 2007: AKUD Rose
- 2008: Milram Continental
- 2009: FC Rheinland-Pfalz/Saar Mainz
- 2009: Kuota–Indeland
- 2010–2011: Quick-Step
- 2012: Eddy Merckx–Indeland
- 2013–2015: MTN–Qhubeka

Managerial team
- 2020–: Team Lotto–Kern Haus

Andreas Stauff (born 22 January 1987) is a German former professional road bicycle racer, who rode professionally between 2007 and 2015. He now works as a directeur sportif for UCI Continental team Team Lotto–Kern Haus Outlet Montabaur.

== Major results ==
2009
Thüringen Rundfahrt der U23

1st Stages 3 & 4

Tour de l'Avenir

1st Points classification
1st Stage 7

3rd Sparkassen Giro Bochum
3rd Schaal Sels-Merksem
2011
3rd Sparkassen Giro Bochum
2013
8th Le Samyn
8th Grand Prix Pino Cerami
2014
5th Overall World Ports Classic
9th ProRace Berlin

=== Grand Tour general classification results timeline ===
Grand Tour	2010
Giro d'Italia	—
Tour de France	—
Vuelta a España	145

Legend
—	Did not compete
DNF	Did not finish
