= Romain Zingle =

Belgian cyclist

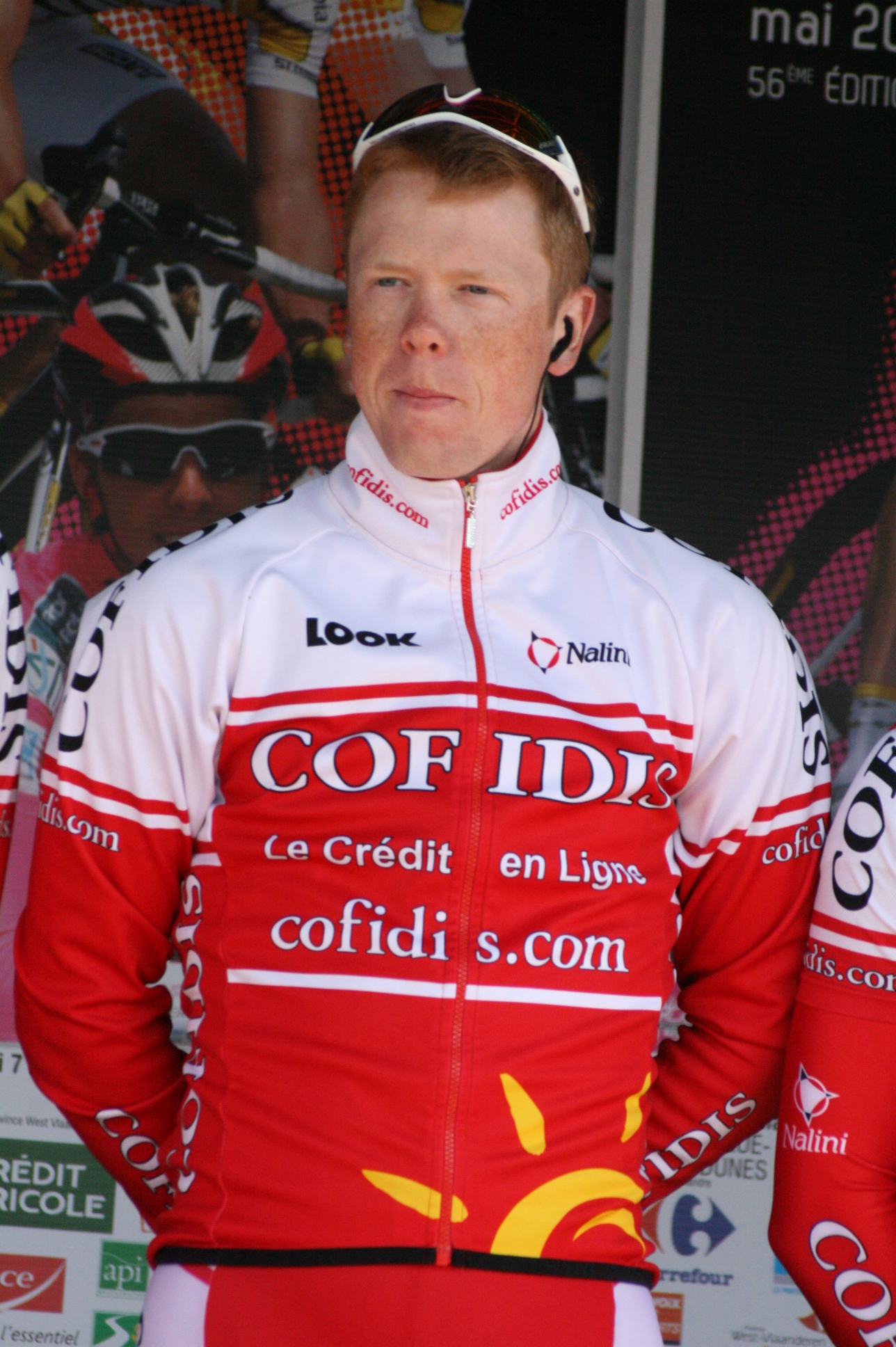
- Zingle in 2010.

Personal information
- Full name: Romain Zingle
- Born: 29 January 1987 (age 39) Lobbes, Belgium
- Height: 1.76 m (5 ft 9 1/2 in)
- Weight: 69 kg (152 lb)

Cycling career
- Sport: Cycling
- Current team: Retired
- Disciplines: Road; Track
- Role: Rider

Amateur teams
- 2008: Groupe Gobert.com.ct
- 2008: Cofidis (stagiaire)

Professional teams
- 2009: Verandas Willems
- 2010–2015: Cofidis

Romain Zingle (born 29 January 1987 in Lobbes) is a Belgian former cyclist, who competed professionally between 2009 and 2015 for the Verandas Willems and Cofidis teams.

== Major results ==
2008
2nd Liège–Bastogne–Liège Espoirs
2nd Paris–Tours Espoirs
2nd Circuit de Wallonie
10th Overall Circuit des Ardennes
2009
1st Circuit de Wallonie
2nd Overall Le Triptyque des Monts et Châteaux
2nd Overall Circuit des Ardennes
2nd Liège–Bastogne–Liège Espoirs
3rd Time trial, National Under-23 Road Championships
5th Paris–Mantes-en-Yvelines
2011
7th Brabantse Pijl
8th Overall Circuit de Lorraine
2013
4th Polynormande
8th Overall La Tropicale Amissa Bongo
2014
9th Classic Loire Atlantique

=== Grand Tour general classification results timeline ===
Grand Tour	2010	2011	2012	2013	2014
Giro d'Italia	Did not contest during his career				
Tour de France	—	152	90	—	—
Vuelta a España	87	—	—	91	83

Legend
—	Did not compete
DNF	Did not finish
