= Kevin De Weert =

Belgian cyclist

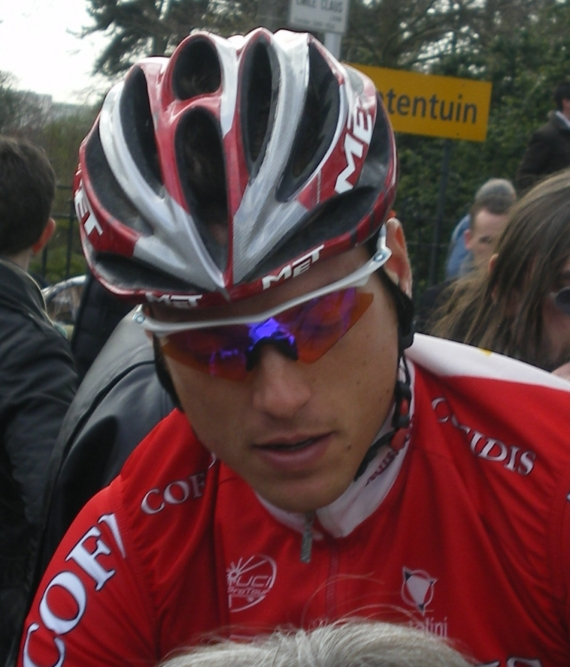
- De Weert at the 2008 Omloop Het Volk.

Personal information
- Full name: Kevin De Weert
- Born: 27 May 1982 (age 44) Duffel, Belgium
- Height: 1.82 m (6 ft 0 in)
- Weight: 70 kg (154 lb)

Cycling career
- Sport: Cycling
- Current team: Retired
- Discipline: Road
- Role: Rider
- Rider type: All-rounder

Amateur teams
- 2001: Rabobank junior
- 2002: Rabobank GS3

Professional teams
- 2003–2004: Rabobank
- 2005–2006: Quick-Step–Innergetic
- 2007–2008: Cofidis
- 2009–2014: Quick-Step
- 2015: LottoNL–Jumbo

Kevin De Weert (born 27 May 1982 in Duffel) is a former Belgian professional road bicycle racer. In October 2014 it was announced would join LottoNL–Jumbo on a two-year deal from 2015, with the team's directeur sportif Nico Verhoeven describing his role as a domestique for the team's general classification riders in stage races. De Weert retired on his 33rd birthday due to the continuing effects of injuries sustained earlier in his career. In February 2016 he succeeded Carlo Bomans as coach of the Belgian national cycling team.

== Major results ==
1998
1st National Under-17 Time Trial Championships
2000
1st National Under-19 Time Trial Championships
1st Giro della Toscana U19
2001
7th Zesbergenprijs Harelbeke
2002
2nd Zesbergenprijs Harelbeke
5th Overall Tour de l'Avenir
2003
5th OZ Tour Beneden-Maas
9th Grote Prijs Stad Zottegem
2007
4th Overall Étoile de Bessèges
2010
17th Overall Tour de France
2011
10th Overall Four Days of Dunkirk
