= Denis Galimzyanov =

Russian cyclist (born 1987)

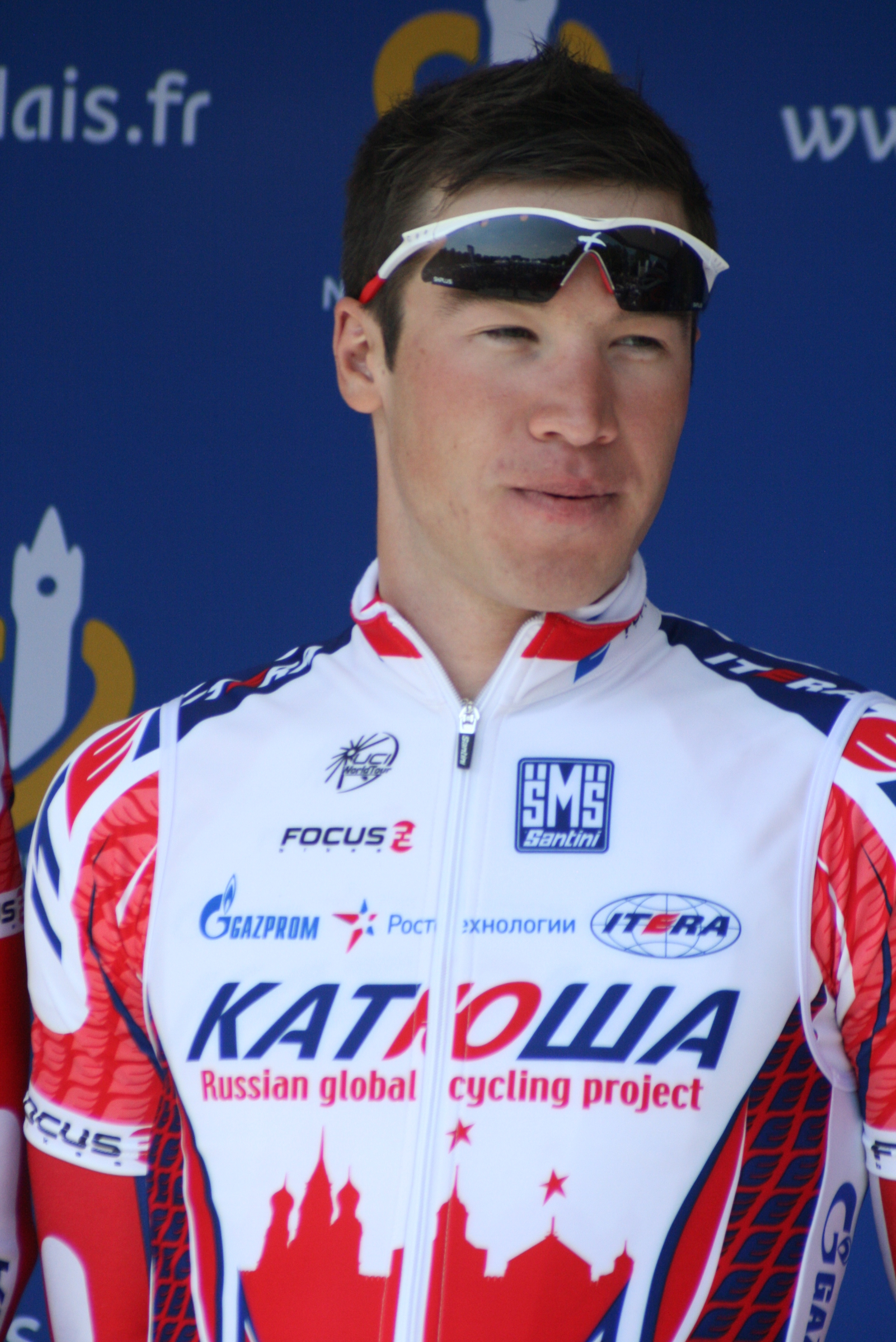
- Galimzyanov at the 2011 Four Days of Dunkirk

Personal information
- Full name: Denis Ramilievich Galimzyanov; Денис Рамильевич Галимзянов
- Born: 7 March 1987 (age 39) Sverdlovsk, Russian SFSR, Soviet Union
- Height: 1.82 m (6 ft 0 in)
- Weight: 75 kg (165 lb)

Cycling career
- Sport: Cycling
- Current team: Retired
- Discipline: Road
- Role: Rider
- Rider type: Sprinter

Professional teams
- 2006–2007: Premier
- 2008: Katusha Continental
- 2009–2012: Team Katusha

Denis Ramilyevich Galimzyanov (Tatar: Денис Рамил улы Галимҗанов, Russian: Денис Рамильевич Галимзянов; born 7 March 1987 in Yekaterinburg, Russian SFSR, Soviet Union) is a former Russian racing cyclist, who last rode for UCI ProTeam Team Katusha. He obtained a major victory in the classic Paris–Brussels in 2011, where he imposed himself in a massive sprint after 218.5 kilometers of racing.

== Doping ==
On 16 April 2012, Galimzyanov was provisionally suspended by the UCI, after testing positive for EPO in an out-of-competition drugs test in March. He admitted the charge the next day and said he took sole responsibility and had acted without the knowledge of his team. In December, it was announced that Galimzyanov was suspended for two years, starting retroactively on 13 April 2012.

He did not return to the peloton after completion of the ban.

== Major results ==
2006
1st Stage 8 Way to Pekin
1st Stage 4b Tour of Bulgaria
2007
1st GP Sochi
1st Mayor Cup
1st Stage 5 Five Rings of Moscow
1st Stage 5 Tour de Berlin
1st Prologue & Stage 3 Tour of Hainan
2008
1st Stage 5 Tour de Normandie
1st Overall Five Rings of Moscow

1st Stages 1b, 2, 3 & 5

1st Stage 3 Bałtyk–Karkonosze Tour
1st Stage 1 Tour of Sochi
2009
5th Nokere Koerse
2010
1st Stage 3 (TTT) Vuelta a Burgos
2nd Grand Prix d'Isbergues
4th Grand Prix de Denain
9th Binche–Tournai–Binche
2011
1st Points classification Three Days of De Panne

1st Stage 2

1st Stage 1 Tour de Luxembourg
1st Paris–Brussels
1st Points classification Tour of Beijing

1st Stage 5

2nd Scheldeprijs
3rd Memorial Rik Van Steenbergen
2012
1st Stage 1 Circuit de la Sarthe

== See also ==
- List of doping cases in cycling
