= Igor Antón =

Spanish road bicycle racer of Basque origin

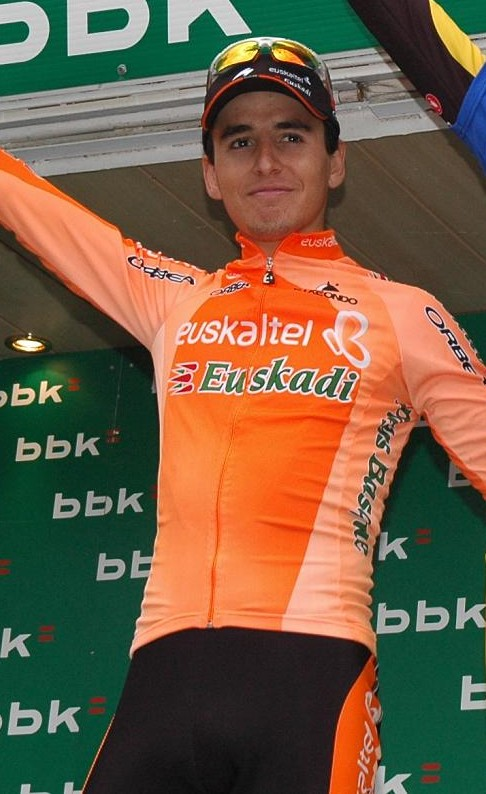
- Antón at the 2008 Euskal Bizikleta.

Personal information
- Full name: Igor Antón Hernández
- Nickname: Fuji
- Born: 2 March 1983 (age 43) Galdakao, Basque Country, Spain
- Height: 1.73 m (5 ft 8 in)
- Weight: 58 kg (128 lb)

Cycling career
- Sport: Cycling
- Current team: Retired
- Discipline: Road
- Role: Rider
- Rider type: Climbing specialist

Amateur team
- 2002–2004: Olarra-Consultec

Professional teams
- 2005–2013: Euskaltel–Euskadi
- 2014–2015: Movistar Team
- 2016–2018: Team Dimension Data

Major wins
- Grand Tours Giro d'Italia 1 individual stage (2011) Vuelta a España 4 individual stages (2006, 2010, 2011)

Igor Antón Hernández (born 2 March 1983) is a Spanish former professional road bicycle racer, who rode professionally between 2005 and 2018 for the Euskaltel–Euskadi, Movistar Team and Team Dimension Data squads.

== Career ==
Born in Galdakao, Basque Country, Antón's first major achievement after turning professional in 2005, was winning the sixteenth stage of the 2006 Vuelta a España, between Almería and the Calar Alto Observatory.

After impressing his team directors in 2007, where he won a stage at the Tour de Romandie, Antón was soon picked out to be the team leader for the general classification (GC) in the 2007 Vuelta a España where he ended up finishing 8th overall. The year started well, and in June he came second in the Euskal Bizikleta. Later in the same month, Antõn won the second stage in the UCI ProTour race Tour de Suisse. In the GC he came home third. In September at the Vuelta a España, Antón was in the best form of his career and held the pace of the likes of Alberto Contador and Alejandro Valverde up the mountains. A fall on the stage to Alto de L'Angliru ended his ambitions in the Vuelta. The fall caused a fractured collarbone, and Antón's season came to an early end.

The 2009 season started slowly for Antón. He started the Tour de France in July, but failed to make a great impression. The Tour was filled with bad luck for Antón as he had at least three falls during the start of the three-week race. However, Antón came out of the Tour in great form and took the season's only victory on 2 August, when he won the Subida a Urkiola.

In 2010, Anton proved to be a formidable rider in the Classics, taking 4th at La Flèche Wallonne and 6th at Liège–Bastogne–Liège. In the Vuelta a España, Anton won Stage 4 and Stage 11 giving him the leader's jersey. However, on Stage 14 whilst wearing the leader's jersey, Anton crashed heavily on a descent and was forced to retire.

In 2011, Anton won two grand tour stages. He won Stage 14 in the Giro d'Italia and Stage 19 in the Vuelta a España which were both summit finishes, the latter almost a 'home' stage with familiar climbs in Biscay and concluding in Bilbao.

In 2012, Anton built his whole season on the 2012 Vuelta a España. He ended up finishing 9th overall after an impressive race in the mountains.

Antón joined the Movistar Team for the 2014 season, after his previous team – Euskaltel–Euskadi – folded at the end of the 2013 season.

In May 2015, Antón renewed with victory after a four-year drought. He won the mountainous first stage of the Vuelta a Asturias with fourteen seconds of an advantage over former Euskaltel teammate Amets Txurruka of Caja Rural–Seguros RGA. He would not let go of the lead on stage two, which was the last stage of the race. He finished with the lead group of five riders.

Anton retired from racing after the last stage of the 2018 Vuelta a España. He was celebrated by the public on the streets of Madrid, when riding in front of the peloton for a while. A few months later, his career was honoured by local football club Athletic Bilbao at their stadium prior to a derby match against Eibar.

== Major results ==
2004
3rd Road race, National Under-23 Road Championships
5th Overall Ronde de l'Isard
5th Overall Volta a Lleida

1st Stage 5a

2006
1st Overall Escalada a Montjuïc

1st Stage 1b (ITT)

1st Stage 16 Vuelta a España
3rd Subida a Urkiola
5th Overall Clásica Internacional de Alcobendas
2007
2nd Overall GP Internacional Paredes Rota dos Móveis
4th Overall Vuelta a Castilla y León
4th Overall Escalada a Montjuïc
7th Overall Tour de Romandie

1st Stage 4

8th Overall Vuelta a España
8th Klasika Primavera
9th GP Miguel Induráin
2008
2nd Overall Euskal Bizikleta
3rd Overall Tour de Suisse

1st Stage 2

9th Clásica a los Puertos de Guadarrama
2009
1st Subida a Urkiola
2010
Vuelta a España

1st Stages 4 & 11

2nd Overall Vuelta a Castilla y León

1st Stage 3

2nd Klasika Primavera
4th La Flèche Wallonne
6th Overall Vuelta a la Comunidad de Madrid
6th Liège–Bastogne–Liège
9th Overall Tour de Romandie

1st Stage 5

9th Overall Bayern–Rundfahrt
9th Overall Vuelta a Burgos
2011
1st Stage 14 Giro d'Italia
1st Stage 19 Vuelta a España
1st Mountains classification Tour of Beijing
3rd Overall Vuelta a Castilla y León
5th La Flèche Wallonne
8th Overall Vuelta a Burgos
2012
3rd Klasika Primavera
7th Overall Critérium International
9th Overall Vuelta a España
9th Overall Vuelta a Burgos
2013
2nd GP Miguel Induráin
6th Vuelta a Murcia
8th La Flèche Wallonne
2014
4th Prueba Villafranca de Ordizia
2015
1st Overall Vuelta a Asturias

1st Stage 1

3rd Overall Vuelta a Castilla y León
2016
9th Overall Vuelta a Burgos
9th Gran Premio di Lugano
10th Giro dell'Emilia
2017
6th Overall Vuelta a Burgos
2018
4th Overall Vuelta a Burgos

=== Grand Tour general classification results timeline ===
Grand Tour	2005	2006	2007	2008	2009	2010	2011	2012	2013	2014	2015	2016	2017	2018
Giro d'Italia	83	—	—	—	—	—	17	—	—	37	38	28	62	DNF
Tour de France	—	—	DNF	—	66	—	—	—	23	—	—	—	—	—
Vuelta a España	—	15	8	DNF	33	DNF	33	9	20	—	—	DNF	35	44
