= Xavier Tondo =

Spanish cyclist (1978–2011)

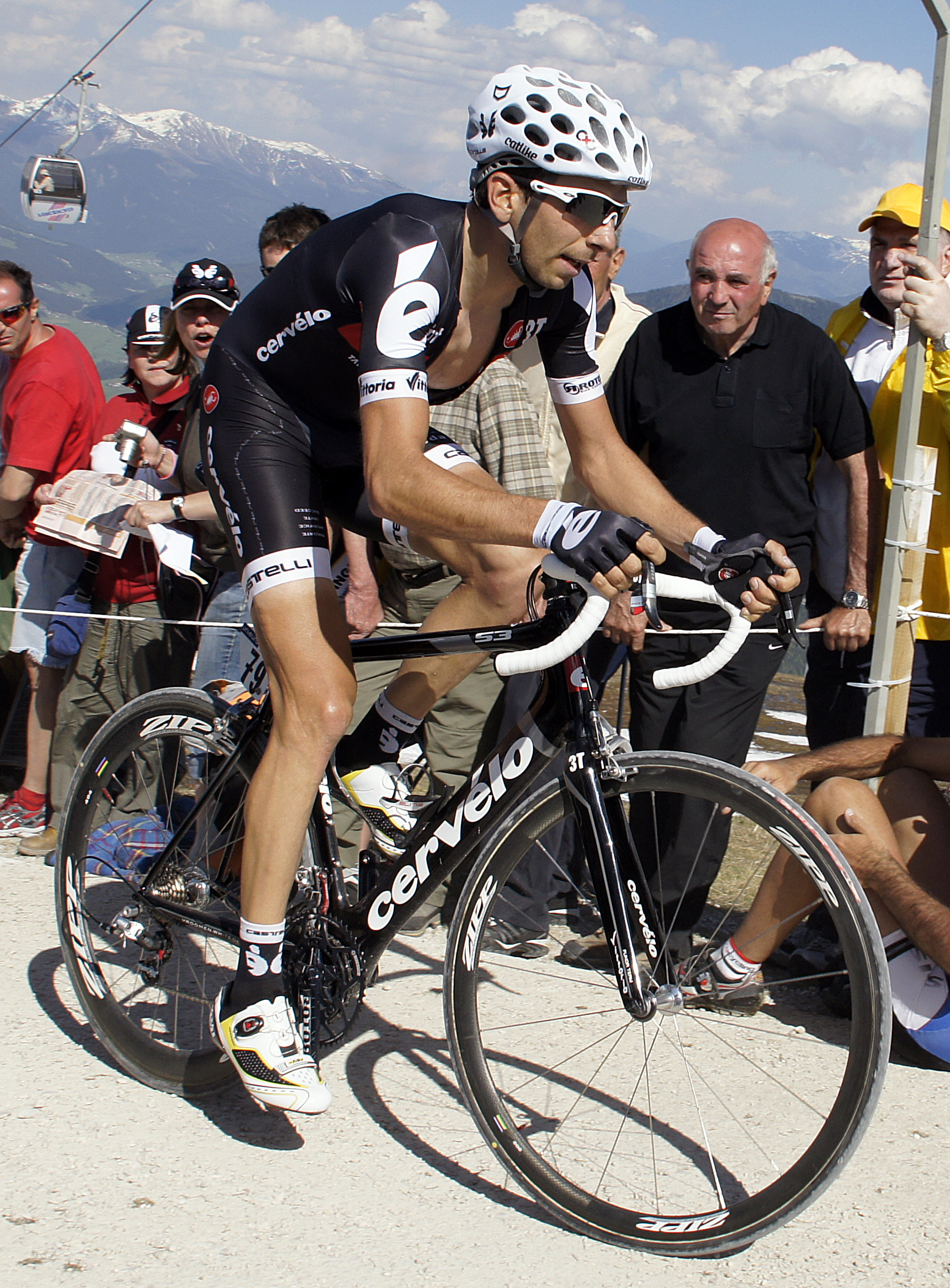
- Tondo in 2010 riding for Cervélo TestTeam

Personal information
- Full name: Xavier Tondo Volpini
- Born: 5 November 1978 Valls, Spain
- Died: 23 May 2011 (aged 32) Monachil, Spain

Cycling career
- Sport: Cycling
- Discipline: Road
- Role: Rider
- Rider type: Climber

Professional teams
- 2003: Paternina-Costa de Almería
- 2004: Barbot-Gaia
- 2005: Catalunya-Angel Mir
- 2006: Relax–GAM
- 2007–2008: LA–MSS
- 2009: Andalucía–Cajasur
- 2010: Cervélo TestTeam
- 2011: Movistar Team

Xavier Tondo Volpini (5 November 1978 in Valls, Spain – 23 May 2011 in Monachil, Spain) was a Spanish professional road racing cyclist who specialized in mountain stages of bicycle races.

== Death ==
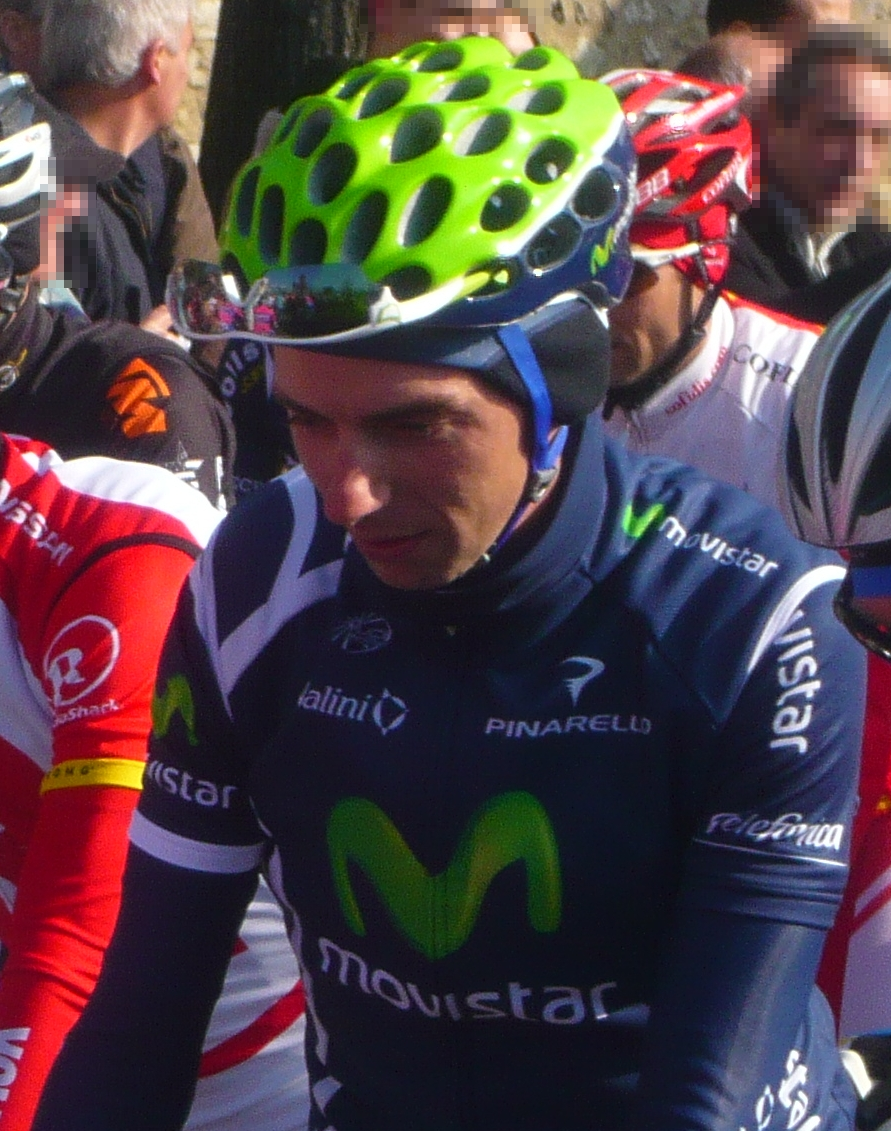
Tondo in 2011

Tondo was killed after being apparently trapped between his own garage door and car, and crushed by the door, while preparing his bicycle for a training ride. Teammate Beñat Intxausti was with him at the time of the accident.

To commemorate Xavier Tondo the 100%Tondo sportive is held yearly, starting in Sant Joan les Fonts and finishing in Vallter 2000.

== Doping refusal ==
In February 2011, it was reported that a pro cyclist had tipped off police about a doping ring. Tondo was later identified as that cyclist.

According to the Spanish newspaper El País, Tondo received an email in December 2010, which offered several doping products, including EPO, human growth hormone, Nandrolone, and Clenbuterol, all at low prices. Tondo gave the email to the police.

== Major results ==
2002
1st Stage 7 Tour of Qinghai Lake
2005
1st Overall Volta ao Alentejo

1st Stage 4

1st Stage 3 Vuelta a Asturias
2007
1st Overall Troféu Joaquim Agostinho

1st Prologue

1st Overall Volta a Portugal
2008
1st Subida al Naranco
2009
1st Stage 5 Tour de San Luis
8th Overall Volta a Catalunya
2010
1st Stage 6 Paris–Nice
2nd Overall Volta a Catalunya

1st Stage 3

5th Overall Vuelta a España
2011
1st Overall Vuelta a Castilla y León
1st Stage 4 (ITT) Tour de San Luis
5th Overall Tour of the Basque Country
6th Overall Volta a Catalunya

== See also ==
- Professionals who died during training and other cycling related deaths
