= Serafín Martínez =

Spanish cyclist (born 1984)

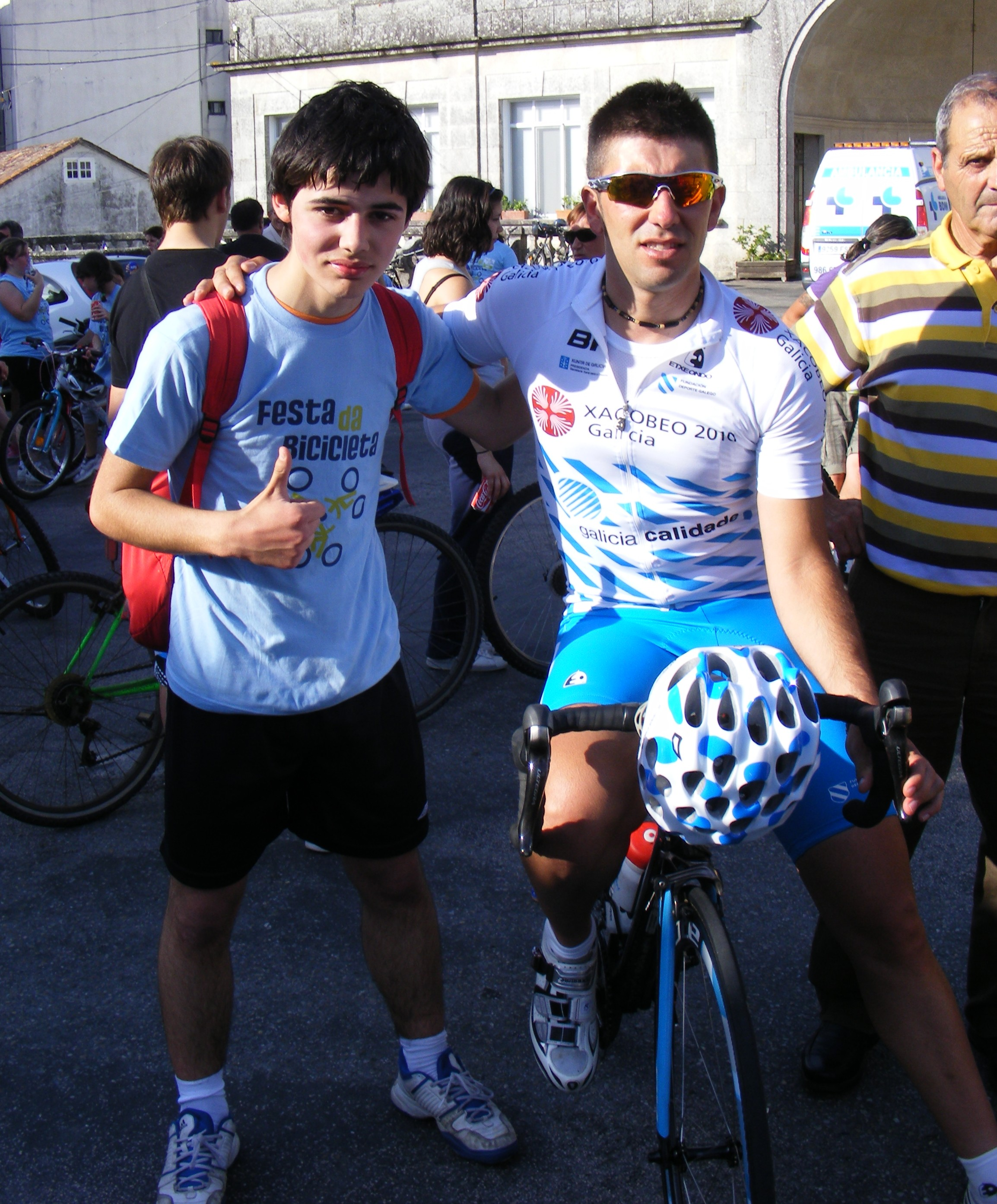
Serafín Martínez Acevedo on the right, with a fan

Serafín Martínez Acevedo (born 14 February 1984 in O Rosal) is a Spanish road cyclist who rode for the continental team Xacobeo–Galicia between 2007 and 2010. Since they have folded he has been without a team.
