= 2010 Vuelta a España =

65th edition of the cycling race

2010 UCI World Ranking, race 23 of 26
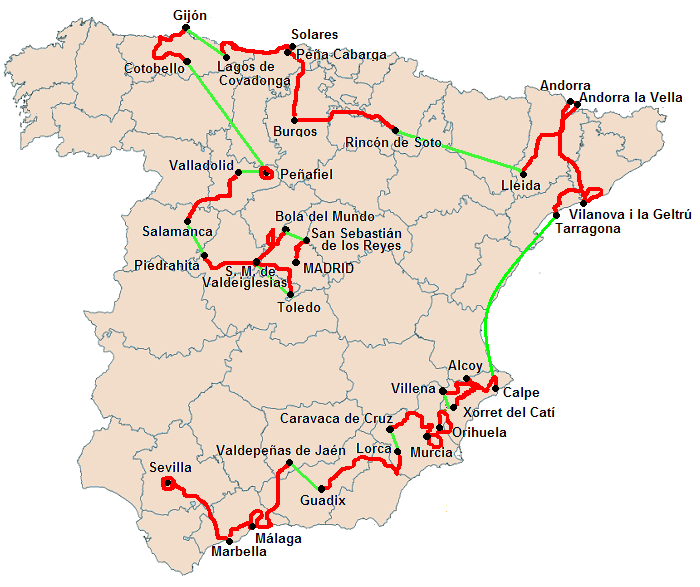

Race details
- Dates: 28 August– 19 September
- Stages: 21
- Distance: 3,333.8 km (2,072 mi)

Results
Jersey awarded to the overall winner	Winner	Vincenzo Nibali (ITA)	(Liquigas–Doimo)
	Second	Ezequiel Mosquera (ESP)	(Xacobeo–Galicia)
	Third	Peter Velits (SVK)	(Team HTC–Columbia)
Jersey awarded to the points classification winner	Points	Mark Cavendish (GBR)	(Team HTC–Columbia)
Jersey awarded to the mountains classification winner	Mountains	David Moncoutié (FRA)	(Cofidis)
Jersey awarded to the combination classification winner	Combination	Vincenzo Nibali (ITA)	(Liquigas–Doimo)
	Team	Team Katusha	

The 2010 Vuelta a España was held from 28 August to 19 September and was won by Vincenzo Nibali. The race began in Seville and ended, as is tradition, in Madrid.

The race covered 3,333.8 km (2,071.5 mi). There was critical analysis that this Vuelta, which commemorates the 75th anniversary of the first edition of the race, was an especially difficult one and that stage 16 was the queen stage.

The stage 1 team time trial was held at night.

Vuelta runner-up Ezequiel Mosquera and Xacobeo–Galicia teammate David García Dapena were announced on September 30 to have given positive tests for hydroxyethyl starch during the race, a substance which is known as a masking agent for erythropoietin (EPO). All results from Mosquera after 12 September (stage 15) were annulled, which caused him to lose his second place. García later was announced to have tested positive for EPO during the race as well.

== Teams ==
Sixteen teams were automatically selected due to previous agreements and there were six wildcard places. Three of these were given to UCI Professional Continental teams, and three to UCI ProTour teams.

Team RadioShack was not invited despite having a ProTour license.

- Ag2r–La Mondiale
- Andalucía–Cajasur
- Astana
- Bbox Bouygues Telecom
- Cervélo TestTeam
- Caisse d'Epargne
- Cofidis
- Euskaltel–Euskadi
- FDJ
- Footon–Servetto–Fuji
- Garmin–Transitions
- Lampre–Farnese
- Liquigas–Doimo
- Omega Pharma–Lotto
- Quick-Step
- Rabobank
- Team HTC–Columbia
- Team Sky
- Team Milram
- Team Saxo Bank
- Team Katusha
- Xacobeo–Galicia

== Route ==
Stage characteristics and winners
Stage	Date	Course	Distance	Type		Winner
1	28 August	Seville	13 km (8.1 mi)	Team time trial	Team time trial	Team HTC–Columbia
2	29 August	Alcalá de Guadaíra to Marbella	173 km (107 mi)		Flat stage	Yauheni Hutarovich (BLR)
3	30 August	Marbella to Málaga	156 km (97 mi)		Mountain stage	Philippe Gilbert (BEL)
4	31 August	Málaga to Valdepeñas de Jaén	177 km (110 mi)		Intermediate stage	Igor Antón (ESP)
5	1 September	Guadix to Lorca	194 km (121 mi)		Flat stage	Tyler Farrar (USA)
6	2 September	Caravaca de la Cruz to Murcia	144 km (89 mi)		Flat stage	Thor Hushovd (NOR)
7	3 September	Murcia to Orihuela	170 km (110 mi)		Flat stage	Alessandro Petacchi (ITA)
8	4 September	Villena to Xorret de Catí	188.8 km (117.3 mi)		Mountain stage	David Moncoutié (FRA)
9	5 September	Calp to Alcoi	187 km (116 mi)		Intermediate stage	David López (ESP)
	6 September	Rest day				
10	7 September	Tarragona to Vilanova i la Geltrú	173.7 km (107.9 mi)		Intermediate stage	Imanol Erviti (ESP)
11	8 September	Vilanova i la Geltrú to Vallnord Sector Pal (Andorra)	208 km (129 mi)		Mountain stage	Igor Antón (ESP)
12	9 September	Andorra la Vella (Andorra) to Lleida	175 km (109 mi)		Flat stage	Mark Cavendish (GBR)
13	10 September	Rincón de Soto to Burgos	193.7 km (120.4 mi)		Flat stage	Mark Cavendish (GBR)
14	11 September	Burgos to Peña Cabarga	178.8 km (111.1 mi)		Mountain stage	Joaquim Rodríguez (ESP)
15	12 September	Solares to Lagos de Covadonga	170 km (110 mi)		Mountain stage	~~Carlos Barredo (ESP)~~
16	13 September	Gijón to Alto de Cotobello	179.3 km (111.4 mi)		Mountain stage	Mikel Nieve (ESP)
	14 September	Rest day				
17	15 September	Peñafiel	46 km (29 mi)	Individual time trial	Individual time trial	Peter Velits (SVK)
18	16 September	Valladolid to Salamanca	153 km (95 mi)		Flat stage	Mark Cavendish (GBR)
19	17 September	Piedrahita to Toledo	200 km (120 mi)		Flat stage	Philippe Gilbert (BEL)
20	18 September	San Martín de Valdeiglesias to Bola del Mundo	168.8 km (104.9 mi)		Mountain stage	Ezequiel Mosquera (ESP)
21	19 September	San Sebastián de los Reyes to Madrid	85 km (53 mi)		Flat stage	Tyler Farrar (USA)
Total			3,333.8 km (2,071.5 mi)			

== Classification leadership ==
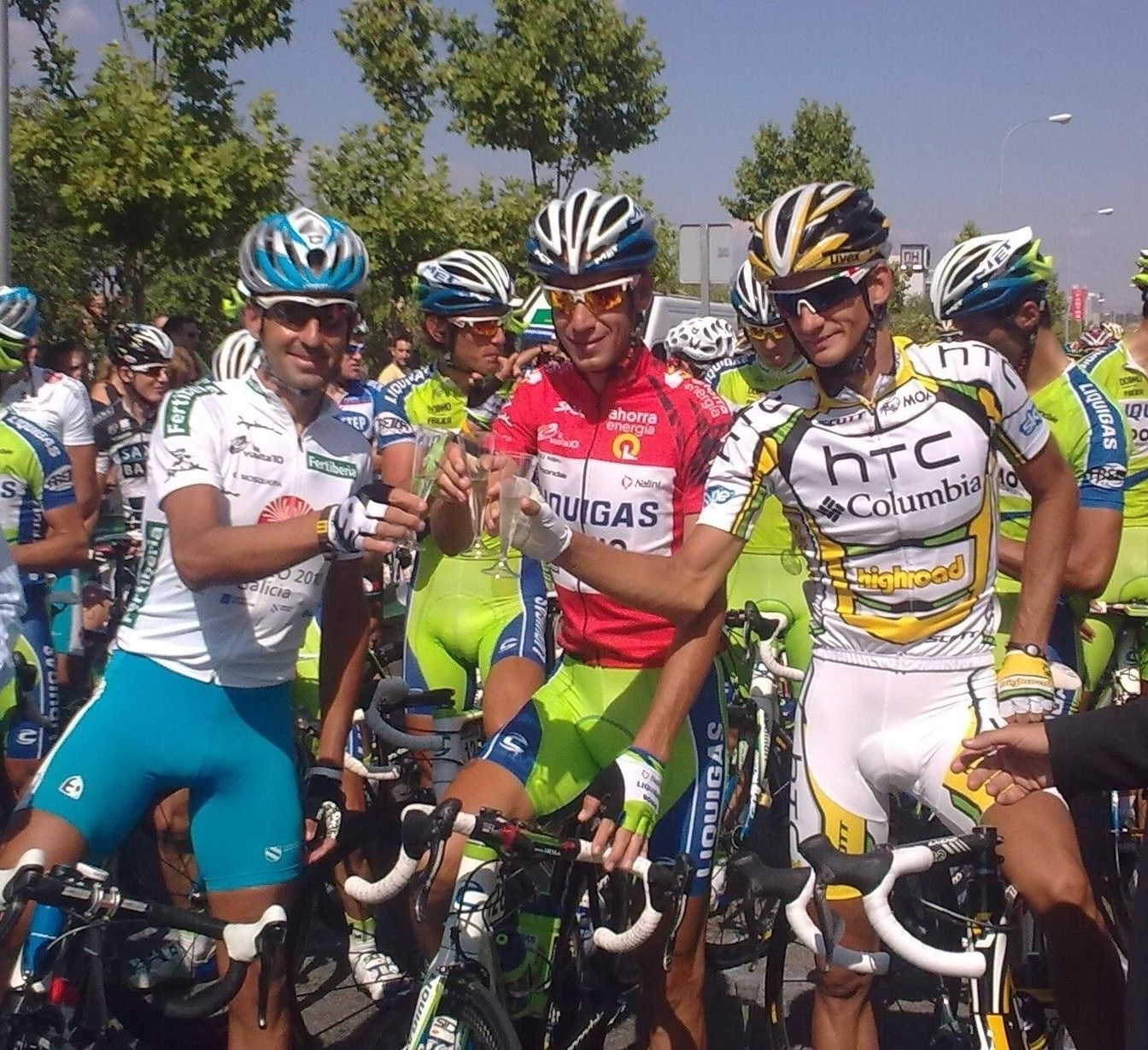
Mosquera, Nibali and Velits (2nd, 1st and 3rd position respectively) toasting.

In the 2010 Vuelta a España, four different jerseys were awarded. For the general classification, calculated by adding the finishing times of the stages per cyclist after deduction of time bonuses for high placings in stage finishes and at intermediate sprints, the leader received a red jersey. This classification was considered the most important of the Vuelta a España, and the winner of the general classification was considered the winner of the Vuelta.

Additionally, there was also a points classification, which awarded a green jersey. In the points classification, cyclists received points for finishing in the top 15 in a stage. The winner got 25 points, second place 20, third 16, fourth 14, fifth 12, sixth 10, and one point per place less down the line, to a single point for fifteenth. In addition, some points were won in intermediate sprints.

There was also a mountains classification, which awarded a blue-spotted white jersey. In the mountains classifications, points were won by reaching the top of a mountain before other cyclists. Each climb was categorized, either first, second, third or "special" category, the last of which is equivalent to the Hors catégorie rating used in races such as the Tour de France.

Finally, there was the combination classification. This is calculated by adding the rankings in the general, points and mountains classifications; the cyclist with the lowest combined ranking is the leader in the combination classification, and receives a white jersey.

There was also a classification for teams. In this classification, the times of the best three cyclists per stage were added, and the team with the lowest time is the leader.

Stage	Winner	General classification	Points classification	Mountains classification	Combination Classification	Team classification
1	Team HTC–Columbia	Mark Cavendish	Mark Cavendish^{1}	not awarded	Mark Cavendish	Team HTC–Columbia
2	Yauheni Hutarovich	Mark Cavendish	Yauheni Hutarovich	Mickaël Delage	Javier Ramírez	Team HTC–Columbia
3	Philippe Gilbert	Philippe Gilbert	Philippe Gilbert	Serafín Martínez	Serafín Martínez	Team HTC–Columbia
4	Igor Antón	Philippe Gilbert	Igor Antón	Serafín Martínez	Vincenzo Nibali	Caisse d'Epargne
5	Tyler Farrar	Philippe Gilbert	Igor Antón	Serafín Martínez	Vincenzo Nibali	Caisse d'Epargne
6	Thor Hushovd	Philippe Gilbert	Philippe Gilbert	Serafín Martínez	Philippe Gilbert	Caisse d'Epargne
7	Alessandro Petacchi	Philippe Gilbert	Mark Cavendish	Serafín Martínez	Philippe Gilbert	Caisse d'Epargne
8	David Moncoutié	Igor Antón	Mark Cavendish	Serafín Martínez	Vincenzo Nibali	Caisse d'Epargne
9	David López	Igor Antón	Mark Cavendish	David Moncoutié	Vincenzo Nibali	Caisse d'Epargne
10	Imanol Erviti	Joaquim Rodríguez	Mark Cavendish	David Moncoutié	David Moncoutié	Caisse d'Epargne
11	Igor Antón	Igor Antón	Igor Antón	David Moncoutié	Igor Antón	Caisse d'Epargne
12	Mark Cavendish	Igor Antón	Mark Cavendish	David Moncoutié	Igor Antón	Caisse d'Epargne
13	Mark Cavendish	Igor Antón	Mark Cavendish	David Moncoutié	Igor Antón	Caisse d'Epargne
14	Joaquim Rodríguez	Vincenzo Nibali	Mark Cavendish	David Moncoutié	Joaquim Rodríguez	Caisse d'Epargne
15	~~Carlos Barredo~~	Vincenzo Nibali	Mark Cavendish	David Moncoutié	Joaquim Rodríguez	Team Katusha
16	Mikel Nieve	Joaquim Rodríguez	Mark Cavendish	David Moncoutié	Joaquim Rodríguez	Team Katusha
17	Peter Velits	Vincenzo Nibali	Mark Cavendish	David Moncoutié	Joaquim Rodríguez	Team Katusha
18	Mark Cavendish	Vincenzo Nibali	Mark Cavendish	David Moncoutié	Joaquim Rodríguez	Team Katusha
19	Philippe Gilbert	Vincenzo Nibali	Mark Cavendish	David Moncoutié	Joaquim Rodríguez	Team Katusha
20	Ezequiel Mosquera	Vincenzo Nibali	Mark Cavendish	David Moncoutié	Vincenzo Nibali	Team Katusha
21	Tyler Farrar	Vincenzo Nibali	Mark Cavendish	David Moncoutié	Vincenzo Nibali	Team Katusha
Final		Vincenzo Nibali	Mark Cavendish	David Moncoutié	Vincenzo Nibali	Team Katusha

^{1} Initially, the team time trial gave points toward the points classification. These points were later removed.

^{2} All results from Mosquera after 12 September (stage 15) were originally annulled. However this was overturned by a Spanish Court.

== Standings ==
=== General classification ===
	Rider	Team	Time
1	Vincenzo Nibali (ITA)	Liquigas–Doimo	87h 18' 33"
2	Ezequiel Mosquera (ESP)	Xacobeo–Galicia	+ 41"
3	Peter Velits (SVK)	Team HTC–Columbia	+ 3' 02"
4	Joaquim Rodríguez (ESP)	Team Katusha	+ 4' 20"
5	Fränk Schleck (LUX)	Team Saxo Bank	+ 4' 43"
6	Xavier Tondó (ESP)	Cervélo TestTeam	+ 4' 52"
7	Nicolas Roche (IRL)	Ag2r–La Mondiale	+ 5' 03"
8	Carlos Sastre (ESP)	Cervélo TestTeam	+ 6' 06"
9	Tom Danielson (USA)	Garmin–Transitions	+ 6' 16"
10	Luis León Sánchez (ESP)	Caisse d'Epargne	+ 7' 42"

=== Points classification ===
	Rider	Team	Points
1	Mark Cavendish (GBR)	Team HTC–Columbia	156
2	Tyler Farrar (USA)	Garmin–Transitions	149
3	Vincenzo Nibali (ITA)	Liquigas–Doimo	119
4	Joaquim Rodríguez (ESP)	Team Katusha	110
5	Philippe Gilbert (BEL)	Omega Pharma–Lotto	104
6	Ezequiel Mosquera (ESP)	Xacobeo–Galicia	97
7	Peter Velits (SVK)	Team HTC–Columbia	88
8	David Moncoutié (FRA)	Cofidis	72
9	Nicolas Roche (IRL)	Ag2r–La Mondiale	63
10	Fränk Schleck (LUX)	Team Saxo Bank	62

=== King of the Mountains classification ===
	Rider	Team	Points
1	David Moncoutié (FRA)	Cofidis	51
2	Serafín Martínez (ESP)	Xacobeo–Galicia	43
3	Ezequiel Mosquera (ESP)	Xacobeo–Galicia	36
4	Joaquim Rodríguez (ESP)	Team Katusha	29
5	Vincenzo Nibali (ITA)	Liquigas–Doimo	26
6	Luis León Sánchez (ESP)	Caisse d'Epargne	25
7	Gonzalo Rabuñal (ESP)	Xacobeo–Galicia	25
8	Mikel Nieve (ESP)	Euskaltel–Euskadi	21
9	Johann Tschopp (CH)	Bbox Bouygues Telecom	18
10	Fränk Schleck (LUX)	Team Saxo Bank	17

=== Combination classification ===
	Rider	Team	Points
1	Vincenzo Nibali (ITA)	Liquigas–Doimo	9
2	Ezequiel Mosquera (ESP)	Xacobeo–Galicia	11
3	Joaquim Rodríguez (ESP)	Team Katusha	12
4	David Moncoutié (FRA)	Cofidis	23
5	Fränk Schleck (LUX)	Team Saxo Bank	25
6	Xavier Tondó (ESP)	Cervélo TestTeam	32
7	Mikel Nieve (ESP)	Euskaltel–Euskadi	43
8	Luis León Sánchez (ESP)	Caisse d'Epargne	48
9	Nicolas Roche (IRL)	Ag2r–La Mondiale	49
10	Christophe Le Mével (FRA)	FDJ	67

=== Teams classification ===
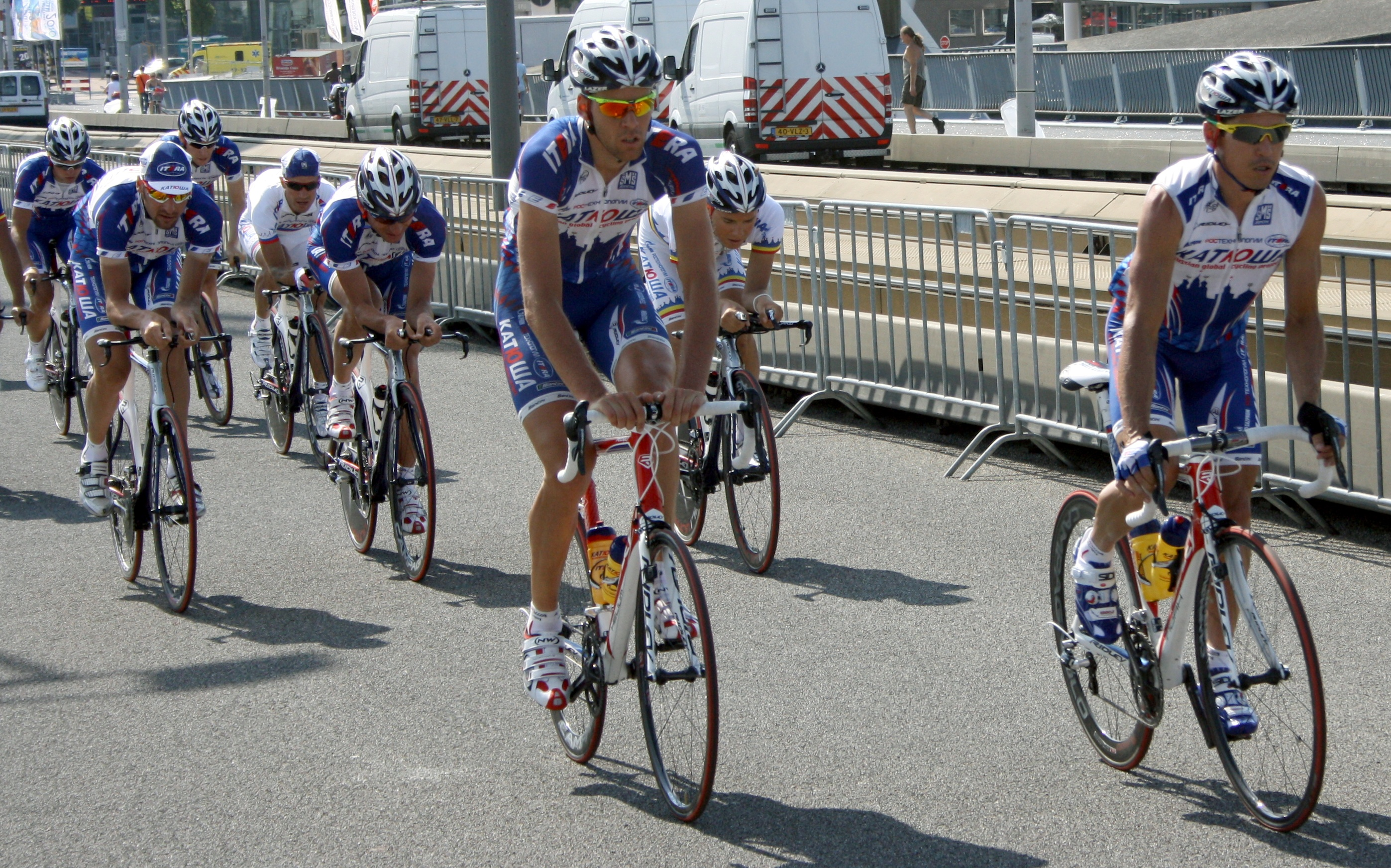
Team Katusha.

	Team	Time
1	Team Katusha	255h 40' 44"
2	Caisse d'Epargne	+ 33"
3	Xacobeo–Galicia	+ 12' 33"
4	Cervélo TestTeam	+ 17' 50"
5	Ag2r–La Mondiale	+ 35' 42"
6	Liquigas–Doimo	+ 57' 05"
7	Omega Pharma–Lotto	+ 1h 08' 04"
8	Euskaltel–Euskadi	+ 1h 12' 06"
9	FDJ	+ 1h 13' 13"
10	Team Saxo Bank	+ 1h 17' 45"
