= 2010 Footon–Servetto–Fuji season =

2010 Footon–Servetto–Fuji season
Manager	Mauro Gianetti
One-day victories	–
Stage race overall victories	1
Stage race stage victories	4
Previous season • Next season

The 2010 season for Footon–Servetto–Fuji began in January with the Tour de San Luis and ended in October at the Giro di Lombardia. As a UCI ProTour team, they were automatically invited and obliged to attend every event in the ProTour.

The team's ridership changed drastically between the 2009 and 2010 seasons, bringing in a sizeable number of new cyclists. Only 5 of its 25 riders were retained from 2009. Six of the departures joined other ProTour teams for 2010, while of the twenty one new cyclists the team acquired, none rode at that level in 2009.

== 2010 roster ==
Ages as of January 1, 2010.

Rider	Date of birth
José Alberto Benítez (ESP)	November 14, 1981 (aged 28)
Matthias Brändle (AUT)	December 7, 1989 (aged 20)
Eros Capecchi (ITA)	June 13, 1986 (aged 23)
Ermanno Capelli (ITA)	May 9, 1985 (aged 24)
Manuel Cardoso (POR)	April 7, 1983 (aged 26)
Vidal Celis (ESP)	August 21, 1982 (aged 27)
Giampaolo Cheula (ITA)	May 23, 1979 (aged 30)
Marco Corti (ITA)	April 2, 1986 (aged 23)
Arkaitz Durán (ESP)	May 18, 1986 (aged 23)
Markus Eibegger (AUT)	October 16, 1984 (aged 25)
Tom Faiers (GBR)	May 19, 1987 (aged 22)
Fabio Felline (ITA)	March 29, 1990 (aged 19)

Rider	Date of birth
Noè Gianetti (SUI)	October 6, 1989 (aged 20)
David Gutiérrez Gutiérrez (ESP)	April 2, 1983 (aged 26)
David Gutiérrez Palacios (ESP)	July 28, 1987 (aged 22)
Enrique Mata (ESP)	June 15, 1985 (aged 24)
Iban Mayoz (ESP)	September 30, 1981 (aged 28)
Pedro Merino (ESP)	July 8, 1987 (aged 22)
Michele Merlo (ITA)	August 7, 1984 (aged 25)
Martin Pedersen (DEN)	April 15, 1983 (aged 26)
Aitor Pérez (ESP)	July 24, 1977 (aged 32)
Rafael Valls (ESP)	June 27, 1987 (aged 22)
David Vitoria (SUI)	October 15, 1984 (aged 25)
Johnnie Walker (AUS)	March 17, 1987 (aged 22)

Riders who joined the team for the 2010 season

Rider	2009 team
Mathias Brändle	Elk Haus
Manuel Cardoso	Liberty Seguros
Vidal Celis	Barbot-Siper
Giampaolo Cheula	Barloworld
Marco Corti	Barloworld
Markus Eibegger	Elk Haus
Tom Faiers	neo-pro
Fabio Felline	neo-pro
Noè Gianetti	neo-pro
David Gutiérrez Gutiérrez	neo-pro
David Gutiérrez Palacios	Camargo elite2
Enrique Mata	Burgos Monumental-Castilla y León
Iban Mayoz	Xacobeo–Galicia
Pedro Merino	stagiaire (Fuji–Servetto)
Michele Merlo	Barloworld
Martin Pedersen	Team Capinordic
Aitor Pérez	Contentpolis-AMPO
Rafael Valls	Burgos Monumental-Castilla y León
David Vitoria	Rock Racing
Johnnie Walker	élite Trasmiera-Fuji

Riders who left the team during or after the 2009 season

Rider	2010 team
Paolo Bailetti	Ceramica Flaminia
Iker Camaño	unknown
David Cañada	Retired
Hilton Clarke	Bahati Foundation Pro Cycling Team
Juan José Cobo	Caisse d'Epargne
David de la Fuente	Astana
Jesús Del Nero	unknown
Ivan Dominguez	Jamis-Sutter Home
Beñat Intxausti	Euskaltel–Euskadi
Alberto Fernández	Suspended
Ángel Gómez	unknown
Héctor González	unknown
Fredrik Kessiakoff	Garmin–Transitions
Robert Kišerlovski	Liquigas–Doimo
Javier Mejías	Team Type 1
Daniele Nardello	Retired
Fabrice Piemontesi	Androni Giocattoli
Ricardo Serrano	Suspended
Boris Shpilevsky	Free agent
Davide Viganò	Team Sky
William Walker	Free agent

== Stage races ==
Valls took the team's first stage win of the year, at the Tour de San Luis. Valls broke away from specialist climbers in the leading peloton to solo to the finish line. The victory also gave him the overall leadership in the race at the time. Valls also won the race's mountains classification. The team next took a stage win at the first ProTour event of the season, the Tour Down Under. On an undulating, hilly stage 3 marked by rain and hot temperatures, Portuguese national champion Cardoso broke away from the leading group headed by Caisse d'Epargne in the final kilometer to take victory a second ahead of big names such as Alejandro Valverde, Cadel Evans, and Michael Rogers.

== Grand Tours ==
=== Giro d'Italia ===
The team was one of 22 invited to the Giro d'Italia. They were not competitive at any point in the race. After failing to have any riders contesting the finishes to the Giro's first two road race stages, their best-placed rider in the overall standings before the transfer to Italy was Brändle in 51st, two minutes back of the race leader. The squad's time in the stage 4 team time trial was provisionally second-best for much of the day, but it ended up being good for only 14th place. In stage 9, Cheula made the morning breakaway, but the stage was decided by a mass sprint, in which Eibegger was 10th. In stage 13, Mayoz made a successful breakaway and came close to a stage win, finishing third in the sprint behind Manuel Belletti and Greg Henderson. This was as close as the team came to any victories. Their best rider in the final overall standings was Mayoz in 22nd place, over an hour back of Giro champion Ivan Basso. The squad also had the dubious distinction of fielding the last-place overall rider; this was Corti, at a deficit to Basso of nearly five hours. They were 18th in the Trofeo Fast Team standings and last in the Trofeo Super Team.

=== Tour de France ===
With the guaranteed invite awarded in September 2008 to the former Saunier Duval-Scott team (this same team with different sponsors), Footon was one of 22 teams in the Tour de France. They were, as they were most of the season, greatly overmatched by their competition – none of the nine riders on Footon's squad had previously ridden any Grand Tour.

Cardoso, who earlier in the season had taken the team's only ProTour-level win, crashed hard near the end of the 10 km (6.2 mi) prologue time trial, and completed it six minutes slower than stage winner Fabian Cancellara. He did not start the first road race stage the next day. The team showed combativity in early stages. Mayoz made it to the morning breakaway with four others in stage 4, but their group was easily caught before a field sprint finish won by Alessandro Petacchi. In stage 7, Valls rode with the leading group on the road after making a selection in the leading peloton. He rode the late parts of the stage just behind the day's winner Sylvain Chavanel, taking second place 57 seconds behind him and 50 seconds ahead of the race's elite riders. Capecchi also rode solidly on this day, taking tenth on the stage from within the main peloton. Benitez found the breakaway in stage 11, but the group did not stay away. Pérez was in the breakaway in stage 15. While Thomas Voeckler was the winner that day, Pérez did hold on for third, as the race's elite riders did not try to catch all members of the day's escape. Valls was the team's highest-placed overall finisher, coming in 53rd at a deficit of one hour and 42 minutes to Tour champion Alberto Contador. The squad was 20th in the teams classification.

== Season victories ==
Date	Race	Competition	Rider	Country	Location
January 19	Tour de San Luis, Stage 2	UCI America Tour	Rafael Valls (ESP)	Argentina	Mirador del Potrero
January 21	Tour Down Under, Stage 3	UCI ProTour	Manuel Cardoso (POR)	Australia	Stirling, South Australia
January 24	Tour de San Luis, Mountains classification	UCI America Tour	Rafael Valls (ESP)	Argentina	
March 28	Volta a Catalunya, Mountains classification	UCI ProTour	David Gutiérrez Gutiérrez (ESP)	Spain	
April 18	Vuelta a Castilla y León, Mountains classification	UCI ProTour	Iban Mayoz (ESP)	Spain	
May 20	Circuit de Lorraine, Stage 2	UCI Europe Tour	Fabio Felline (ITA)	France	Chantraine
May 21	Circuit de Lorraine, Stage 3	UCI Europe Tour	Fabio Felline (ITA)	France	Saint-Avold
May 23	Circuit de Lorraine, Overall	UCI Europe Tour	Fabio Felline (ITA)	France	
May 23	Circuit de Lorraine, Points classification	UCI Europe Tour	Fabio Felline (ITA)	France	
May 23	Circuit de Lorraine, Youth classification	UCI Europe Tour	Fabio Felline (ITA)	France	
