= 2011 Geox–TMC season =

2011 Geox–TMC season
Manager	Mauro Gianetti
One-day victories	1
Stage race overall victories	1
Stage race stage victories	3
Previous season

The 2011 season for the Geox–TMC cycling team, its last, began in February at the Gran Premio della Costa Etruschi and ended in October at the Tour of Hainan. With new financial backers and a greatly improved roster over their meager 2010 season, the team had hoped to retain UCI ProTeam status in the offseason. Instead, they rode as a UCI Professional Continental team, meaning that they had to be selected by the organizers of any UCI World Tour event if they were to compete. This included each of the season's Grand Tours. The team's manager and license-holder was former Liège–Bastogne–Liège winner Mauro Gianetti. Though both Geox and TMC expressed desire to replace him with former Mapei manager Álvaro Crespi, since the team did not attain ProTeam status, nothing came of this during the season. Crespi held an official role with the team as a consultant.

For the second successive year, the team's roster was drastically changed, though in contrast to 2010, many top-level riders joined the team for 2011, including Denis Menchov and Carlos Sastre, who between them had won all of cycling's Grand Tours. The 2011 season added another Grand Tour winner to the team's stable, as Juan José Cobo was the surprise winner of the Vuelta a España. The overall, a stage, and three classifications at the Vuelta provided for the vast majority of Geox-TMC's victories in 2011, as they had not won any race prior to the Vuelta for two months, and only one in the preceding four months. Neither Menchov nor Sastre had any wins in 2011.

Geox withdrew sponsorship after the 2011 season, later paving the way for the team to collapse.

== 2011 roster ==
Ages as of January 1, 2011.

Rider	Date of birth
Tomas Alberio (ITA)	March 13, 1989 (aged 21)
Mauricio Ardila (COL)	May 12, 1979 (aged 31)
David Blanco (ESP)	March 13, 1975 (aged 35)
Matthias Brändle (AUT)	December 7, 1989 (aged 21)
Giampaolo Cheula (ITA)	May 23, 1979 (aged 31)
Juan José Cobo (ESP)	February 11, 1981 (aged 29)
Daniele Colli (ITA)	April 19, 1982 (aged 28)
Marco Corti (ITA)	April 2, 1986 (aged 24)
David de la Fuente (ESP)	May 4, 1981 (aged 29)
Fabio Duarte (COL)	June 11, 1986 (aged 24)
Arkaitz Durán (ESP)	May 18, 1986 (aged 24)
Fabio Felline (ITA)	March 29, 1990 (aged 20)
Xavier Florencio (ESP)	December 26, 1979 (aged 31)

Rider	Date of birth
Noè Gianetti (SUI)	October 6, 1989 (aged 21)
Maurizio Gorato (Note: Rider joined the team on August 1 as a stagiaire.) (ITA)	November 10, 1987 (aged 23)
David Gutiérrez Gutiérrez (ESP)	April 2, 1983 (aged 27)
Dmitry Kozonchuk (RUS)	April 5, 1984 (aged 26)
Marko Kump (SLO)	September 9, 1988 (aged 22)
Denis Menchov (RUS)	January 25, 1978 (aged 32)
Matteo Pelucchi (ITA)	January 21, 1989 (aged 21)
Daniele Ratto (ITA)	October 5, 1989 (aged 21)
Carlos Sastre (ESP)	April 22, 1975 (aged 35)
Tino Thömel (GER)	June 6, 1988 (aged 22)
Albert Torres (ESP)	April 26, 1990 (aged 20)
Rafael Valls (ESP)	June 27, 1987 (aged 23)
Marcel Wyss (SUI)	June 25, 1986 (aged 24)

Riders who joined the team for the 2011 season

Rider	2010 team
Tomas Alberio	neo-pro
Mauricio Ardila	Rabobank
David Blanco	Palmeiras
Juan José Cobo	Caisse d'Epargne
Daniele Colli	Ceramica Flaminia
David de la Fuente	Astana
Fabio Duarte	Café de Colombia–Colombia es Pasión
Xavier Florencio	Cervélo TestTeam
Dmitriy Kozontchuk	Rabobank
Marko Kump	Adria Mobil
Denis Menchov	Rabobank
Matteo Pelucchi	neo-pro
Daniele Ratto	Carmiooro NGC
Carlos Sastre	Cervélo TestTeam
Marcel Wyss	Cervélo TestTeam

Riders who left the team during or after the 2010 season

Rider	2011 team
José Alberto Benítez	Andalucía–Caja Granada
Ermanno Capelli	Team Vorarlberg
Manuel Cardoso	Team RadioShack
Eros Capecchi	Liquigas–Cannondale
Markus Eibegger	Tabriz Petrochemical Cycling Team
Tom Faiers	Team Wonderful Pistachios
David Gutiérrez Palacios	Bidelan-Kirolgi
Enrique Mata	None
Iban Mayoz	None
Pedro Merino	Miche–Guerciotti
Michele Merlo	De Rosa–Ceramica Flaminia
Martin Pedersen	Leopard Trek
Aitor Pérez	Lampre–ISD
Johnnie Walker	Fly V Australia

== One-day races ==
Before the spring season and the races known as classics, the team was active in the Vuelta a Mallorca series of one-day races. After the team's best rider outside the top 50 in each of the first two races, Durán featured highly in the Trofeo Inca after pulling away from the main field on the descent of the final climb of the race, the Puig Major, along with Team RadioShack rider Ben Hermans and Movistar Team's Xavier Tondo. With 5 km (3.1 mi) remaining, the trio were a minute clear of the field, and were left to fight it out for the race's honours, where Hermans won ahead of Durán and Tondo. The following day, Cheula was part of a five-man breakaway in the Trofeo Deià that remained out front for 75 km (46.6 mi), but ultimately the race came down to a sprint for victory, which was claimed by Movistar Team's José Joaquín Rojas. Cobo was the best of the team's riders, as he finished in third place. Ratto finished tenth in the Gran Premio dell'Insubria-Lugano at the end of February, before Duarte finished second the next day, in the Gran Premio di Lugano.

=== Spring classics ===
Neo-pro Pelucchi took the team's first – and ultimately, only single-day – win at the Clásica de Almería in late February, coming home first in a full field sprint. In April, Ardila finished tenth in Klasika Primavera, while Ratto finished second to Barbot–Efapel rider Santiago Pérez in the Gran Premio de Llodio, and Ardila also finished inside the top ten. The team also had two riders place within the top six of the following day's race, the Vuelta a La Rioja, as Ratto finished fifth and Felline sixth, within a field of around 20 riders, eight seconds down on race-winner Imanol Erviti for the Movistar Team. Ratto completed the team's first half of single-day races with eighth place in June's Giro di Toscana.

The team also sent squads to the Gran Premio della Costa Etruschi, Trofeo Palma, Trofeo Cala Millor, Trofeo Palmanova, Montepaschi Strade Bianche, Milan–San Remo, the GP Miguel Indurain and the Philadelphia International Championship, but placed no higher than 13th in any of these races.

=== Fall races ===
In a full field sprint at the end of July's Gran Premio Nobili Rubinetterie – Coppa Città di Stresa, Colli was the team's best placed finisher, taking eighth place on the line. In the following day's Coppa Papà Carlo element to the race, Felline finished 15 seconds down on Liquigas–Cannondale rider Simone Ponzi in ninth position, just beating UnitedHealthcare's Charly Wegelius. In August, Ratto placed highly in the Coppa Ugo Agostoni and Trofeo Melinda races, taking seventh and fourth places respectively. Colli was tenth in the Gran Premio Industria e Commercio Artigianato Carnaghese towards the end of August, eighth in Paris–Brussels, after Ratto had made his way into the breakaway, and seventh in the Gran Premio Industria e Commercio di Prato, both of which held in September. The team's last notable results in a single-day race were seventh and ninth places for Felline and Cobo – after a spell in the breakaway – in the Memorial Marco Pantani race, and eighth for de la Fuente in the Coppa Sabatini five days later.

The team also sent squads to Prueba Villafranca de Ordizia, the Clásica de San Sebastián, Circuito de Getxo, Trofeo Matteotti, Tre Valli Varesine, the Coppa Bernocchi, the Grand Prix de Fourmies, the Giro dell'Emilia, the Gran Premio Bruno Beghelli, the Giro del Piemonte, the Giro di Lombardia and the Chrono des Nations, but placed no higher than 11th in any of these races.

== Stage races ==
The Vuelta a Murcia was the first race of the season for co-leaders Menchov and Sastre. Sastre lost 37 seconds on the flat first stage, but Menchov made all the selections and finished with the overall contenders at the front of the race. In stage 2, Alberto Contador beat Menchov and Saur–Sojasun's Jérôme Coppel on a downhill finish, after having been first to the top of the Alto del Collado Bermejo. Menchov finished third in the final day time trial, securing that same position on the event's final podium. The squad also won the teams classification. Duarte showed his climbing prowess at the Giro del Trentino, winning stage 3 which finished with the first-category ascent of Fai della Paganella. He also outkicked Team RadioShack's Tiago Machado in view of the finish line, as the two of them finished three seconds clear of the next group on the road.

In July's Tour of Austria, the race splintered on the second stage, a summit finish to the Kitzbüheler Horn. Sastre and Menchov both attacked out of the lead chase group, after a number of riders had reached the bottom of the climb with an advantage of several minutes. Sastre fared better of the pair, as he finished fourth, 1' 22" down on stage winner Fredrik Kessiakoff (Astana). Wyss tried to take a stage victory the following day, having been part of a 13-man breakaway for much of the stage, but fell metres short and was swept up by a further 23-rider group which included four of his team-mates. After Ratto placed fifth on stage 6, Sastre moved into third place overall after BMC Racing Team's Mauro Santambrogio, a rider not known for his time trial ability, lost sufficient time on stage 7 to fall from second place to sixth overall. Menchov moved into the top five with his time trial placing, and both riders held their respective positions to the end of the race. In the Brixia Tour later in July, Felline finished third on the opening stage, before winning stage 2a, leading home Colli in a 1–2 finish to a 30-rider sprint. Colli took another second-place finish on stage 3, and a fifth place on the final stage, to win the points classification.

At August's Vuelta a Burgos, Menchov took fourth place on the opening stage of the event, losing out in a sprint with Sergio Pardilla of the Movistar Team; Cobo and Blanco also finished inside the top ten, several seconds later. The next day, Cobo again finished well inside the top ten, with a fifth-place result, and Felline led home an eleven-rider group for eighth place. After an average team time trial in which the squad ranked eighth of the 15 taking part, Cobo placed fifth once again on the fourth stage, with Blanco and Menchov taking their second top-ten placings of the race, in eighth and tenth places respectively. Cobo made a bid for victory in the final stage, but was out-sprinted to the line by Euskaltel–Euskadi rider Mikel Landa, but still did enough for second on the stage and an eventual third-place finish overall.

The team also won lesser classifications at the Tour of Oman, the Tour de Romandie, the Circuit de Lorraine, and the Tour of Hainan. The team also sent squads to the Tour of Qatar, Vuelta an Andalucía, Rutas de América, the Volta a Catalunya, the Settimana internazionale di Coppi e Bartali, the Tour of the Basque Country, Vuelta a Castilla y León, Vuelta a Asturias, Vuelta a la Comunidad de Madrid, the Tour de Luxembourg, the Tour of Slovenia, the Tour of Austria, the Danmark Rundt, the Tour of Elk Grove, the Tour of Utah and the Settimana Ciclistica Lombarda, but did not achieve a stage win, classification win, or podium finish in any of them.

== Grand Tours ==
As a Professional Continental team, Geox-TMC needed to be selected by the organizers of any of the Grand Tours in order to participate. They were selected to ride the Giro d'Italia and the Vuelta a España, but not the Tour de France.

=== Giro d'Italia ===
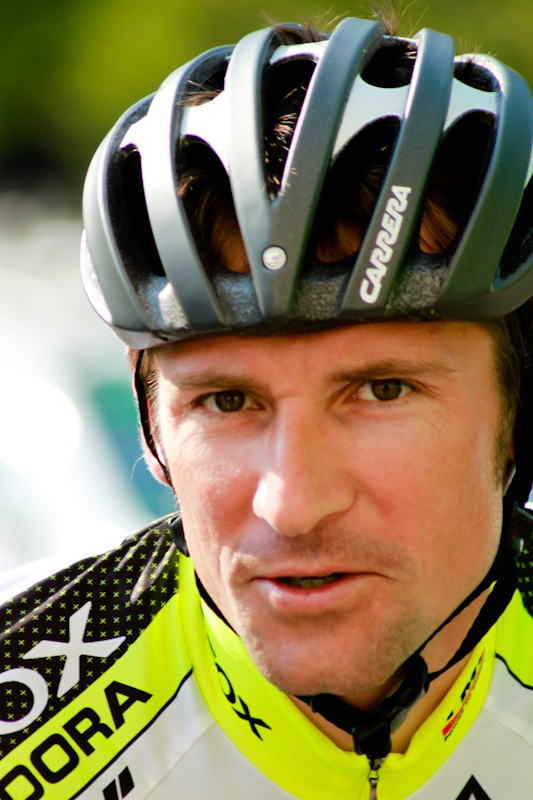
Denis Menchov, pictured at the Tour de Romandie held just before the Giro, was Geox-TMC's team leader at the race. He also finished as the team's best placed rider, as he finished in eighth place overall; his third top ten finish in the Giro.

Menchov was the squad's leader at the Giro, with Sastre riding in support, and added help from Blanco, Valls and Wyss. Also named to the squad were the team's Colombian pairing of Ardila and Duarte, Cheula and Kozonchuk. The team's struggled in the stage 1 team time trial, as they came home 18th of the 23 teams, 53 seconds off the winning pace set by HTC–Highroad; as a result, Menchov and Sastre were left handicapped in the general classification, losing time to many of the other overall contenders. Duarte and Valls kept their two protected riders clear of any danger up to stage five, where Duarte finished second to Rabobank's Pieter Weening, leading home a number of riders eight seconds behind. Duarte moved up to 13th place overall after his result, and trailed Weening's team-mate Steven Kruijswijk by 15 seconds for the lead in the young rider classification. Duarte abandoned the race three days later, as he was physically unable to carry on in the race, after a stage three incident left him with a knee injury that became worse up until his withdrawal.

A quiet week followed for the squad, before Valls made it into the breakaway on stage 13, as the race headed into Austria to the finish on the Grossglockner. Valls was one of 16 riders to venture out front, but did not last in the breakaway, and ultimately lost almost 19 minutes to stage-winner José Rujano of Androni Giocattoli by the end of the stage. Menchov finished 1' 36" down on Rujano in tenth place, and moved into eleventh place in the general classification, already over five minutes down on Alberto Contador (Saxo Bank–SunGard). Menchov again featured highly the following day, on stage 14 and its finish atop Monte Zoncolan. He was part of a group consisting of himself, Astana's Roman Kreuziger, Liquigas–Cannondale rider Vincenzo Nibali and several other riders. Menchov and Nibali both got away from Kreuziger, but Nibali himself attacked Menchov and went clear. Menchov eventually finished the stage in fifth place, losing another 48 seconds to Contador, who was second to Euskaltel–Euskadi's Igor Antón; Menchov's placing allowed him to move up to seventh overall.

On stage 15, after a previous breakaway had been brought back, eleven riders counter-attacked the field including Sastre, and their advantage over the main field quickly extended to nearly ten minutes while on the slopes of the day's second climb, the Passo Cibiana. While the lead pack were on the Passo Giau, a number of riders including Menchov attacked from the front end of the peloton. The remnants of the breakaway were eventually caught by the Passo Fedaia. Menchov eventually finished over four minutes down in eleventh place, but maintained seventh place in the overall classification, nine seconds behind Rujano and twelve ahead of Kreuziger. Menchov maintained seventh overall with a seventh place on the stage 16 individual time trial, 52 seconds on Contador, who won his second stage of the Giro. With Kanstantsin Sivtsov of HTC–Highroad being part of a successful breakaway the next day, Menchov dropped down to eighth in the general classification. Sastre again was part of a large lead group the next day, but failed to make inroads on a small move within the pack, and eventually finished at the rear of the breakaway, along with Kozonchuk, some 80 seconds ahead of the main field. After losing eighth place overall on stage 19, Menchov profited from time lost by Euskaltel–Euskadi rider Mikel Nieve, who had been sixth, to move back into eighth place overall; a position he finished the race in, but over 12 minutes down on Contador.

=== Vuelta a España ===
Just like the Giro, Menchov was the squad's leader at the Vuelta, with Sastre riding in support, and added help from Blanco, de la Fuente and Cobo. Ardila and Duarte were again named to a Grand Tour for the team, with Brändle and Kozonchuk completing its nine-rider entry. The squad started with another mediocre performance in the team time trial, coming in second last of the 22 teams, with only Andalucía–Caja Granada recording a slower time. Menchov struggled on the third stage, as he gave up nearly 90 seconds on most of the other favourites for the race, by failing to keep with their pace on the day's final climb, the Alto de la Santa. De la Fuente tried to make a late-race escape on stage 6 along with three other riders, but the quartet were quickly caught, as they could only muster a maximum advantage over the main field or around ten seconds. Menchov earned the team's first top-ten stage placing of the race on stage 8, as he finished eighth on the steep hill into San Lorenzo de El Escorial.

The following day, Cobo and Menchov were both present in a small lead group that pulled back the breakaway within the final 10 km (6.2 mi) of the stage to La Covatilla. After several moves attempted to get away, Cobo and three other riders bridged up to Dan Martin (Garmin–Cervélo) and Liquigas–Cannondale's Vincenzo Nibali, and although Cobo could only manage third behind Martin and Rabobank's Bauke Mollema, the bonus seconds awarded on the line helped Cobo to move into the top ten overall. Menchov finished nine seconds further back in eighth place, which helped the squad move to the top of the teams classification. Cobo moved up to eighth overall after the stage 10 individual time trial, thanks to a decent showing – 23rd; the team's second best behind Menchov, who was 13th – and the fact that several riders ahead of him in the classification were less proficient in time-trialling; a performance that left Cobo satisfied after the stage. Duarte was part of a 19-man breakaway on stage 11, but faltered on the final climb and eventually finished 27 seconds behind the main race favourites, including Cobo, but finished in the same time as Menchov, Sastre and Blanco. A 20-man escape group made a successful breakaway on stage 13, with three of the riders – de la Fuente, Blanco and Sastre – being members of the squad, and de la Fuente earned fourth place in the final sprint to the line, with Blanco also breaking into the top ten positions, with eighth place.

As the race began to take shape in the Cantabrian Mountains, de la Fuente again made the breakaway the following day, with 17 riders in attendance as their gap over the main field extended to over seven and a half minutes with 77 km (47.8 mi) remaining on the roads. Around 40 km (24.9 mi) later, de la Fuente attacked with Cofidis rider Rein Taaramäe, and the two riders held a healthy advantage of around a minute into the final 10 km (6.2 mi) of the stage. Back in the main pack, Cobo – riding in his home region – attacked with Team Katusha's Daniel Moreno in the closing stages, and after dropping Moreno, Cobo linked up with de la Fuente on the road after he had been dropped in turn by Taaramäe. The pair tried to catch Taaramäe but ultimately fell 25 seconds shy of doing so, with Cobo crossing the line second, and de la Fuente third, four seconds in arrears; his efforts on the day were rewarded with the most combative rider honours for the stage. Menchov finished the stage eighth, and helped the squad regain the lead of the teams classification, with Cobo moving up to fourth place overall, 55 seconds down on leader Bradley Wiggins of Team Sky. The race changed again as it went into its final week, with the 15th stage – the queen stage of the Vuelta – to the Angliru, with an average gradient of 10% and a maximum gradient of over 23% at the Cueña les Cabres section of the climb.

Prior to the main field reaching the climb, Sastre and three other riders formed a small group that chased down Skil–Shimano's Simon Geschke, who had been out front for a period of time. Sastre attacked at the front building an advantage of over 15 seconds over his companions, and was later joined by Igor Antón (Euskaltel–Euskadi) for a short time before Antón overhauled him and rode off on his own. Cobo was next to make a move, as he accelerated away from the main field on the Les Cabañes section, soon joining Antón at the head of the race. Menchov was part of the group that was behind Cobo on the road, along with several other riders including overall leader Wiggins. Cobo continued to extend his lead on the road, and ultimately soloed to the stage victory. His attack on the climb was also rewarded with the overall lead of the race, as Wiggins cracked on the climb and lost 81 seconds – not including Cobo's 20-second bonus on the finish line – to Cobo, and fell to third overall behind his team-mate Chris Froome, who finished the stage fourth behind Vacansoleil–DCM rider Wout Poels and Menchov. Menchov moved into sixth place overall, three minutes behind Cobo.

A split in the field on the run-in to the finish of stage 16 in Haro meant that Cobo, who finished the stage in tenth, extended his lead to 22 seconds over Froome and 51 seconds over Wiggins. The following day was the last real summit finish of the race, the climb to Peña Cabarga, at an altitude of 565 metres (1,854 ft). Froome shadowed Cobo on the slopes of the climb, and it was not until the final 1.5 kilometres (0.9 mi) that Froome and Cobo managed to pull clear of the remaining riders of their group, including Wiggins, after pulling back Omega Pharma–Lotto's Jurgen Van den Broeck. After the duo had pulled clear, Froome attacked Cobo and looked to have gained enough of an advantage to make his way back into the lead of the race, but Cobo managed to bridge back to Froome with around 150 metres (490 ft) left. Cobo kicked for the line from there, but Froome took the inside line on the final corner and managed to win the stage, but could only gain nine seconds – one second on the road plus eight bonus seconds on the line – on Cobo, to reduce his advantage to 13 seconds.

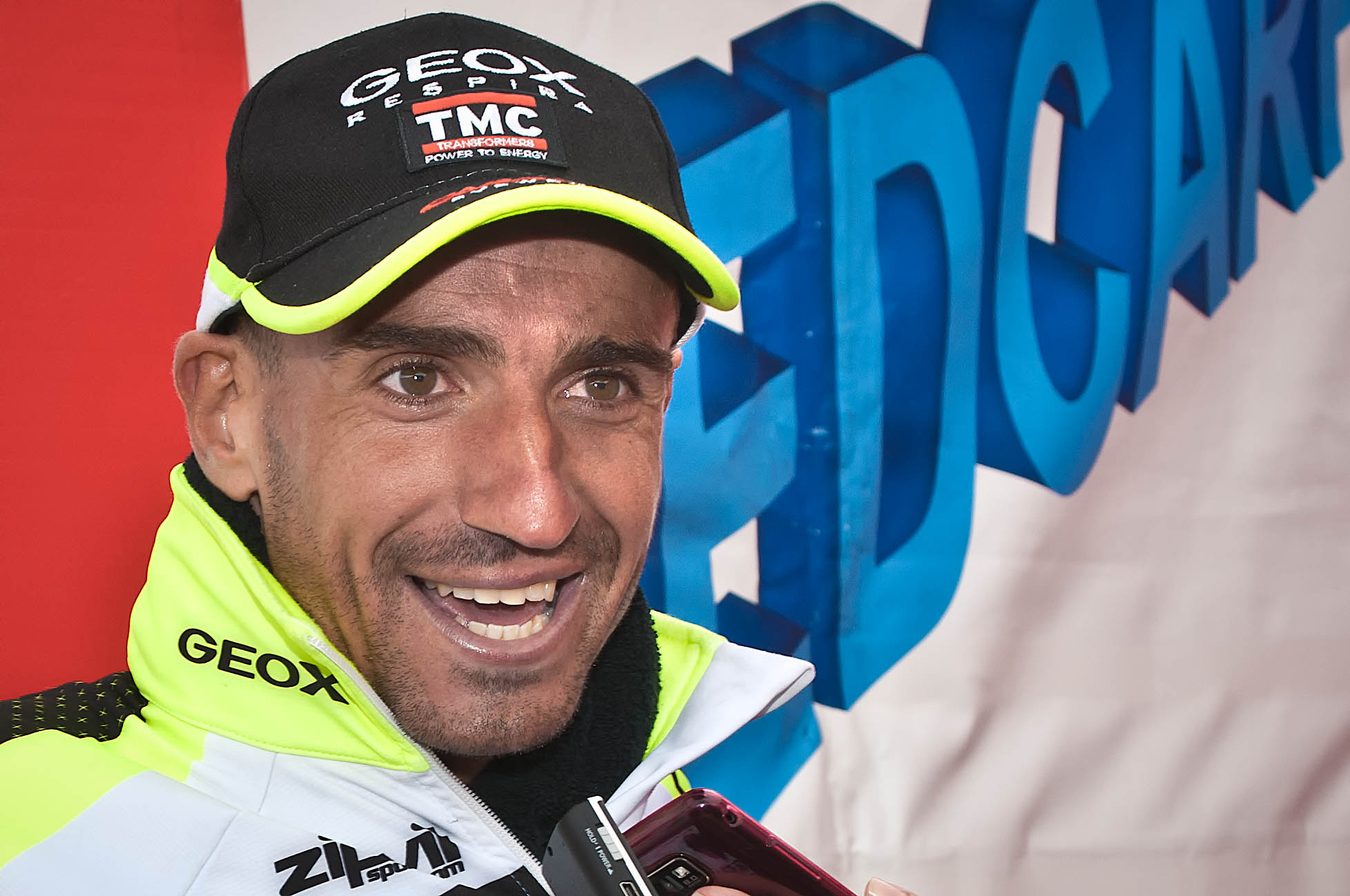
With his Vuelta victory, Juan José Cobo earned his first overall win since the 2007 Tour of the Basque Country.

Menchov finished the stage ninth, 31 seconds behind Froome, but moved into fifth place overall ahead of Leopard Trek's Maxime Monfort. Froome tried to make his move in the Basque Country on stage 19, but was well guarded by Cobo, and resulted in no change in the general classification. De la Fuente led home a group of 20 riders, in sixth place, 1' 33" down on stage winner Igor Antón, with Menchov also in the group. Froome made a decisive error in the penultimate stage, misjudging an intermediate sprint banner, and as a result went for the points and elusive bonus seconds 4 kilometres (2.5 mi) too soon, and as a result, could not affect Cobo's 13-second lead prior to the final stage. Cobo secured victory at the end of the final stage, a processional affair until hitting the streets of Madrid, with Froome finishing just in front on the stage results. Cobo's winning margin of 13 seconds over Froome was tied for the third-closest in Vuelta history, and was his first overall victory in a stage race, since he won the 2007 Tour of the Basque Country for Saunier Duval–Prodir. As well as winning the general classification, Cobo won the white jersey for the combination classification, a classification calculated by adding the numeral ranks of a cyclist in the general, points, and mountains classifications. The squad also handily won the teams classification, by over ten minutes ahead of the next closest team, Leopard Trek, in what would ultimately turn out to be the team's final Grand Tour race.

== Team dissolution ==
Despite Cobo's victory in the Vuelta a España, Mario Moretti Polegato, the president of the team's sponsor Geox, stated that he would review his sponsorship of the team at the end of the season. On 5 October, it was announced that the squad had not applied for a licence to compete in 2012. Two weeks later, it was announced that Geox would be pulling their sponsorship from the team, and as a result, did not raise enough capital by a registration deadline in order to acquire a licence for the 2012 season. The Union Cycliste Internationale later ruled that as Geox-TMC's licence application was incomplete, riders could freely leave the team and seek contracts with other teams. The squad's directeur sportif, Joxean Fernández Matxin, appealed to other companies for their backing, but later allowed the likes of Cobo and de la Fuente to search for new teams for the 2012 season.

Matxin and Gianetti travelled to Venezuela later in November, in the hope of instigating a sponsorship package from the country, primarily with the tourist board of the country. Venezuela – País de Sueño, had been reported to be interested about investing into the sport of cycling as a whole. Ten days later, Gianetti stated that the team had two concrete offers from potential backers, including the Venezuelans, and stated that he was hopeful of concluding a deal for the squad's continuation in 2012. On 6 December, team management were reported to have given up on finding a sponsor for the 2012 season, and decided to focus their attentions of finding their riders an alternative team to ride for. Matxin originally stated that he wished to continue looking for sponsors until the end of the year, but backtracked a week later, giving up on the search for a new backer. UnitedHealthcare team director Mike Tamayo later confirmed that Gianetti had approached him in November to consider a potential merger between the two teams, but plans did not materialise.

=== Riders' 2012 teams ===
Rider	2012 team
Tomas Alberio	Team Idea
Mauricio Ardila	Comcel-Colombia
David Blanco	Efapel–Glassdrive
Matthias Brändle	Team NetApp
Giampaolo Cheula	Retired to compete in mountain biking
Juan José Cobo	Movistar Team
Daniele Colli	Team Type 1–Sanofi
Marco Corti	
David de la Fuente	Caja Rural
Fabio Duarte	Colombia–Coldeportes
Arkaitz Durán	Telco'm-Conor Azysa

Rider	2012 team
Fabio Felline	Androni Giocattoli–Venezuela
Xavier Florencio	Team Katusha
Noè Gianetti	Team Exergy
David Gutiérrez Gutiérrez	Gomar-Cantabria Deporte-Ferroatlantica
Dmitry Kozonchuk	RusVelo
Marko Kump	Adria Mobil
Denis Menchov	Team Katusha
Matteo Pelucchi	Team Europcar
Daniele Ratto	Liquigas–Cannondale
Carlos Sastre	Retired
Rafael Valls	Vacansoleil–DCM
Marcel Wyss	Atlas Personal-Jakroo

== Season victories ==
Date	Race	Competition	Rider	Country	Location
February 20	Tour of Oman, Combativity classification	UCI Asia Tour	Marko Kump (SLO)	Oman	
February 27	Clásica de Almería	UCI Europe Tour	Matteo Pelucchi (ITA)	Spain	Almería
March 6	Vuelta a Murcia, Teams classification	UCI Europe Tour	(Note: The riders on the squad were Denis Menchov, Carlos Sastre, David Blanco, Juan José Cobo, Fabio Duarte, Arkaitz Durán, and Rafael Valls)	Spain	
April 21	Giro del Trentino, Stage 3	UCI Europe Tour	Fabio Duarte (COL)	Italy	Fai della Paganella
May 1	Tour de Romandie, Sprints classification	UCI World Tour	Matthias Brändle (AUT)	Switzerland	
May 22	Circuit de Lorraine, Young rider classification	UCI Europe Tour	Fabio Felline (ITA)	France	
May 22	Circuit de Lorraine, Sprints classification	UCI Europe Tour	Matthias Brändle (AUT)	France	
July 21	Brixia Tour, Stage 2a	UCI Europe Tour	Fabio Felline (ITA)	Italy	Brescia
July 24	Brixia Tour, Points classification	UCI Europe Tour	Daniele Colli (ITA)	Italy	
September 4	Vuelta a España, Stage 15	UCI World Tour	Juan José Cobo (ESP)	Spain	Angliru
September 11	Vuelta a España, Overall	UCI World Tour	Juan José Cobo (ESP)	Spain	
September 11	Vuelta a España, Combination classification	UCI World Tour	Juan José Cobo (ESP)	Spain	
September 11	Vuelta a España, Teams classification	UCI World Tour	(Note: The riders on the squad were Juan José Cobo, David Blanco, David de la Fuente, Fabio Duarte, Denis Menchov, Carlos Sastre, Mauricio Ardila, Matthias Brändle, and Dmitry Kozonchuk)	Spain	
October 28	Tour of Hainan, Mountains classification	UCI Asia Tour	Maurizio Gorato (ITA) (Note: Riding as a stagiaire (trainee))	China	
October 28	Tour of Hainan, Teams classification	UCI Asia Tour	(Note: The riders on the squad were Giampaolo Cheula, Daniele Colli, David Gutiérrez Gutiérrez, Xavier Florencio, Marko Kump, and Maurizio Gorato)	China	
