= Faiers =

Faiers is a surname. Notable people with the surname include:

- Billie Faiers (born 1990), English television personality
- Martin Faiers (born 1954), English anti-cultist and deprogrammer
- Sam Faiers (born 1990), English television personality and model, sister of Billie
- Thomas Faiers (born 1987), English road racing cyclist
