= 2010 Volta a Catalunya =

2010 UCI World Ranking, race 5 of 26

Race details
- Dates: 22–28 March 2010
- Stages: 7
- Distance: 1,042 km (647.5 mi)
- Winning time: 25h 16' 03"

Results
Jersey awarded to the overall winner	Winner	Joaquim Rodríguez (ESP)	(Team Katusha)
	Second	Xavier Tondó (ESP)	(Cervélo TestTeam)
	Third	Rein Taaramäe (EST)	(Cofidis)
Jersey awarded to the mountains classification winner	Mountains	David Gutiérrez Gutiérrez (ESP)	(Footon–Servetto–Fuji)
Jersey awarded to the sprints classification winner	Sprints	Jonathan Castroviejo (ESP)	(Euskaltel–Euskadi)
	Team	Team Katusha	

The 2010 Volta a Catalunya was the 90th running of the race. It was the second race of the UCI ProTour calendar of 2010, and took place from 22nd to 28th March 2010.

== Participating teams ==
As the Volta a Catalunya was a UCI ProTour event, all 18 ProTour teams were automatically invited and obligated to send a squad. Four Professional Continental teams rounded out the event's peloton. Each team was entitled to eight riders on their squad, but Lampre–Farnese Vini, Team HTC–Columbia, and Team Milram sent only seven, and Team Sky sent only six, meaning the event had 171 riders at its outset.

The 22 teams in the race were:

- Ag2r–La Mondiale
- Andalucía–Cajasur
- Astana
- Caisse d'Epargne
- Cervélo TestTeam
- Cofidis
- Euskaltel–Euskadi
- Footon–Servetto–Fuji
- Française des Jeux
- Garmin–Transitions
- Lampre–Farnese Vini
- Liquigas–Doimo
- Omega Pharma–Lotto
- Quick-Step
- Rabobank
- Team HTC–Columbia
- Team Katusha
- Team Milram
- Team RadioShack
- Team Saxo Bank
- Team Sky
- Xacobeo–Galicia

== Route ==
Stage characteristics and winners
Stage	Date	Course	Distance	Type	Winner
1	22 March	Lloret de Mar	3.6 km (2.2 mi)	Individual time trial	Paul Voss (GER)
2	23 March	Salt to Banyoles	182.6 km (113.5 mi)		Mark Cavendish (GBR)
3	24 March	La Vall d'en Bas to La Seu d'Urgell	185.9 km (115.5 mi)		Xavier Tondo (ESP)
4	25 March	Oliana to Ascó	209.7 km (130.3 mi)		Jens Voigt (GER)
5	26 March	Ascó to Cabacés	181.2 km (112.6 mi)		Davide Malacarne (ITA)
6	27 March	El Vendrell to Barcelona	161.9 km (100.6 mi)		Samuel Dumoulin (FRA)
7	28 March	Esportparc to Circuit de Catalunya	117.8 km (73.2 mi)		Juan José Haedo (ARG)

== Stages ==
=== Stage 1 ===
22 March 2010, Lloret de Mar, 3.6 km (2.2 mi) (individual time trial)

The course for the brief individual time trial, which opened the race was dead flat. This was the same course used in the two years previous in the time trial. Paul Voss of Team Milram was the unexpected winner of the stage, beating out Levi Leipheimer and Andreas Klöden.

Stage 1 Results and General Classification after Stage 1

	Cyclist	Team	Time
1	Paul Voss (GER)	Team Milram	4' 57"
2	Levi Leipheimer (USA)	Team RadioShack	+ 1"
3	Andreas Klöden (GER)	Team RadioShack	+ 2"
4	Dominik Nerz (GER)	Team Milram	+ 4"
5	Jan Bakelants (BEL)	Omega Pharma–Lotto	+ 4"
6	Davide Malacarne (ITA)	Quick-Step	+ 4"
7	Mark Cavendish (GBR)	Team HTC–Columbia	+ 4"
8	Craig Lewis (USA)	Team HTC–Columbia	+ 5"
9	Nicolas Roche (IRE)	Ag2r–La Mondiale	+ 6"
10	Kristjan Koren (SLO)	Liquigas–Doimo	+ 6"

=== Stage 2 ===
23 March 2010, Salt to Banyoles, 182.6 km (113.5 mi)

This course included the race's first climb, the first-category Alt Els Àngels, which crested just before the 60 km (37 mi) mark. The 110 km (68 mi) after the descent to the finish line were mostly flat, leaving a sprint finish.

Peter Stetina and Jonathan Castroviejo formed a two-man escape after 9 km (5.6 mi) of this stage. They took a maximum advantage of eight and a half minutes, but the teams of the sprinters, namely Lampre–Farnese Vini and Team HTC–Columbia, had no trouble catching up to them. In their effort, they had gain the lead in the mountains and sprints competitions after this stage. The finish was contested in a bunched sprint, won by Mark Cavendish. It was Cavendish's first win of 2010 after a difficult early season.

Stage 2 Result

	Cyclist	Team	Time
1	Mark Cavendish (GBR)	Team HTC–Columbia	4h 15' 46"
2	Juan José Haedo (ARG)	Team Saxo Bank	s.t.
3	Aitor Galdós (ESP)	Euskaltel–Euskadi	s.t.
4	Samuel Dumoulin (FRA)	Cofidis	s.t.
5	Michel Kreder (NED)	Garmin–Transitions	s.t.
6	Manuel Cardoso (POR)	Footon–Servetto–Fuji	s.t.
7	Kristjan Koren (SLO)	Liquigas–Doimo	s.t.
8	Nicolas Roche (IRL)	Ag2r–La Mondiale	s.t.
9	Ryder Hesjedal (CAN)	Garmin–Transitions	s.t.
10	Daniel Moreno (ESP)	Omega Pharma–Lotto	s.t.

General Classification after Stage 2

	Cyclist	Team	Time
1	Paul Voss (GER)	Team Milram	4h 20' 43"
2	Levi Leipheimer (USA)	Team RadioShack	+ 1"
3	Andreas Klöden (GER)	Team RadioShack	+ 2"
4	Dominik Nerz (GER)	Team Milram	+ 4"
5	Jan Bakelants (BEL)	Omega Pharma–Lotto	+ 4"
6	Davide Malacarne (ITA)	Quick-Step	+ 4"
7	Mark Cavendish (GBR)	Team HTC–Columbia	+ 4"
8	Craig Lewis (USA)	Team HTC–Columbia	+ 5"
9	Nicolas Roche (IRE)	Ag2r–La Mondiale	+ 6"
10	Kristjan Koren (SLO)	Liquigas–Doimo	+ 6"

=== Stage 3 ===
24 March 2010, La Vall d'en Bas to La Seu d'Urgell, 185.9 km (115.5 mi)

This was a difficult stage, with several categorized climbs. The outside categorization Alt del Pedraforça was the Cima Peris, the race's hardest climb, and crested just before the 120 km (75 mi) mark, after two second-category climbs earlier on. Another category-two climb, the Alt de la Josa del Cadí, followed before a 26 km (16 mi) long descent to the finish line.

A 21-rider break began this stage, but it was pulled back after an hour. A group of 14 was next on the attack, after 60 km (37 mi) had been covered. This group at one point had a three-minute advantage on the main field, but the steady tempo that Liquigas–Doimo and Team RadioShack were drilling out reduced the gap. Xavier Tondó, Joaquim Rodríguez and Óscar Pereiro attacked out of the main field when the catch seemed imminent. Pereiro quickly dropped back, as they had at this point reached the hardest parts of the Alt de la Josa del Cadí climb, but Tondó and Rodríguez stayed away to the finish. Tondó won the sprint to the finish line, but Rodríguez became the new race leader, since he had had a better time in the stage 1 time trial. Tondó expressed after the stage that the win had great personal significance for him, since he is from Catalonia and grew up 7 km (4.3 mi) from where the stage ended.

Stage 3 Result

	Cyclist	Team	Time
1	Xavier Tondó (ESP)	Cervélo TestTeam	4h 43' 23"
2	Joaquim Rodríguez (ESP)	Team Katusha	s.t.
3	Luis León Sánchez (ESP)	Caisse d'Epargne	+ 48"
4	Sandy Casar (FRA)	Française des Jeux	+ 1' 20"
5	Michel Kreder (NED)	Garmin–Transitions	+ 1' 20"
6	Nicolas Roche (IRE)	Ag2r–La Mondiale	+ 1' 20"
7	Pieter Weening (NED)	Rabobank	+ 1' 20"
8	Aitor Pérez (ESP)	Footon–Servetto–Fuji	+ 1' 20"
9	Paolo Tiralongo (ITA)	Astana	+ 1' 20"
10	Rein Taaramäe (EST)	Cofidis	+ 1' 20"

General Classification after Stage 3

	Cyclist	Team	Time
1	Joaquim Rodríguez (ESP)	Team Katusha	9h 04' 12"
2	Xavier Tondó (ESP)	Cervélo TestTeam	+ 10"
3	Luis León Sánchez (ESP)	Caisse d'Epargne	+ 48"
4	Nicolas Roche (IRE)	Ag2r–La Mondiale	+ 1' 20"
5	Kristjan Koren (SLO)	Liquigas–Doimo	+ 1' 20"
6	Ryder Hesjedal (CAN)	Garmin–Transitions	+ 1' 20"
7	Rein Taaramäe (EST)	Cofidis	+ 1' 20"
8	Roman Kreuziger (CZE)	Liquigas–Doimo	+ 1' 22"
9	Michel Kreder (NED)	Garmin–Transitions	+ 1' 24"
10	Óscar Pereiro (ESP)	Astana	+ 1' 24"

=== Stage 4 ===
25 March 2010, Oliana to Ascó, 209.7 km (130.3 mi)

This course started at an elevation, undulated gently for a while and then descended int preparation for two second-category climbs. The Alt de Paumeres crested at 20.9 km (13.0 mi) from the finish line, and the finish came on a long descent from that height.

This was a very fast stage, with the first two hours of racing covering more than 100 km (62 mi). During that time, an eight-rider breakaway group formed. They were later reduced to four – Vladimir Efimkin, Thibaut Pinot, Francesco Bellotti, and Jurgen Van De Walle. During the Alt de Paumeres climb, Jens Voigt, who had earlier been dropped from the peloton, made a solo bridge to the four leaders. Once with the group, he set a pace that eventually cracked all of them, sending them back to the chase groups behind. Voigt was the first over the summit, alone. Rein Taaramäe and Roman Kreuziger caught up with Voigt on the descent. After dropping Kreuziger, Taaramäe and Voigt increased their lead over the Team Katusha-led main field, and finished 34 seconds better than them at the finish line. Taaramäe did most of the pace making in the final flat section, since he started on the seventh day in the overall standings and stood to gain more than Voigt, from having such a big time gap as possible on the peloton. Voigt was therefore able to win the sprint easily.

Stage 4 Result

	Cyclist	Team	Time
1	Jens Voigt (GER)	Team Saxo Bank	4h 43' 28"
2	Rein Taaramäe (EST)	Cofidis	s.t.
3	Paul Voss (GER)	Team Milram	+ 34"
4	Michel Kreder (NED)	Garmin–Transitions	+ 34"
5	David Loosli (SUI)	Lampre–Farnese Vini	+ 34"
6	Jérémy Roy (FRA)	Française des Jeux	+ 34"
7	Josep Jufré (ESP)	Astana	+ 34"
8	Daniel Moreno (ESP)	Omega Pharma–Lotto	+ 34"
9	Robert Kišerlovski (CRO)	Liquigas–Doimo	+ 34"
10	Igor Antón (ESP)	Euskaltel–Euskadi	+ 34"

General Classification after Stage 4

	Cyclist	Team	Time
1	Joaquim Rodríguez (ESP)	Team Katusha	13h 48' 14"
2	Xavier Tondó (ESP)	Cervélo TestTeam	+ 10"
3	Rein Taaramäe (EST)	Cofidis	+ 46"
4	Luis León Sánchez (ESP)	Caisse d'Epargne	+ 48"
5	Nicolas Roche (IRE)	Ag2r–La Mondiale	+ 1' 20"
6	Kristjan Koren (SLO)	Liquigas–Doimo	+ 1' 20"
7	Ryder Hesjedal (CAN)	Garmin–Transitions	+ 1' 20"
8	Roman Kreuziger (CZE)	Liquigas–Doimo	+ 1' 22"
9	Michel Kreder (NED)	Garmin–Transitions	+ 1' 24"
10	Janez Brajkovič (SLO)	Team RadioShack	+ 1' 25"

=== Stage 5 ===
26 March 2010, Ascó to Cabacés, 181.2 km (112.6 mi)

This was another hilly stage, marked by three categorized climbs, including one 15 km (9.3 mi) from the finish line. The finish line came on a descent.

Four riders escaped just 2 km (1.2 mi) into this stage. These were Davide Malacarne, Javier Ramirez, Sergio De Lis, and Gustavo César. Since Malacarne, 29 minutes behind race leader Joaquim Rodríguez, was the best-placed man in the group, the peloton was content to let them go. Their advantage quickly ballooned to ten minutes. The lead fell a little on the day's second climb, the Alt de Porrera, as Team Katusha and Liquigas–Doimo started an aggressive chase. Malacarne shod his breakaway companions 20 km (12 mi) from the finish line and held on for the win. It was the first win of Malacarne's pro career, and it came on a stage that he and the team had specifically identified as one where a winning breakaway would likely happen.

Stage 5 Result

	Cyclist	Team	Time
1	Davide Malacarne (ITA)	Quick-Step	4h 50' 03"
2	Andreas Klöden (GER)	Team RadioShack	+ 36"
3	Luis León Sánchez (ESP)	Caisse d'Epargne	+ 37"
4	Michel Kreder (NED)	Garmin–Transitions	+ 37"
5	Rein Taaramäe (EST)	Cofidis	+ 37"
6	Paolo Tiralongo (ITA)	Astana	+ 40"
7	Joaquim Rodríguez (ESP)	Team Katusha	+ 40"
8	Fränk Schleck (LUX)	Team Saxo Bank	+ 40"
9	Ryder Hesjedal (CAN)	Garmin–Transitions	+ 40"
10	Eros Capecchi (ITA)	Footon–Servetto–Fuji	+ 40"

General Classification after Stage 5

	Cyclist	Team	Time
1	Joaquim Rodríguez (ESP)	Team Katusha	18h 38' 57"
2	Xavier Tondó (ESP)	Cervélo TestTeam	+ 10"
3	Rein Taaramäe (EST)	Cofidis	+ 43"
4	Luis León Sánchez (ESP)	Caisse d'Epargne	+ 45"
5	Nicolas Roche (IRE)	Ag2r–La Mondiale	+ 1' 20"
6	Ryder Hesjedal (CAN)	Garmin–Transitions	+ 1' 20"
7	Michel Kreder (NED)	Garmin–Transitions	+ 1' 21"
8	Roman Kreuziger (CZE)	Liquigas–Doimo	+ 1' 22"
9	Janez Brajkovič (SLO)	Team RadioShack	+ 1' 25"
10	Rémy Di Gregorio (FRA)	Française des Jeux	+ 1' 26"

=== Stage 6 ===
27 March 2010, El Vendrell to Barcelona, 161.9 km (100.6 mi)

There were a lot of climbing in the first half of this stage, including an uncategorized rise of 600 m (2,000 ft). The second half is mostly flat, concluding with a three-lap circuit in Barcelona that includes a visit to a small third-category climb on each lap. Forty-six riders finished the stage in the same group for a depleted bunched sprint. Cofidis' Samuel Dumoulin was easily the strongest sprinter in the group and won the stage, giving his team its 12th win of the season. His teammate Rein Taaramäe was second on the stage, the two of them securing their high places on a day when the financial services provider Cofidis decided to continue sponsoring the team for two more seasons. Each of the top ten riders in the overall standings finished with the leading group, so there was no significant change to those standings heading into the final day of racing.

Stage 6 Result

	Cyclist	Team	Time
1	Samuel Dumoulin (FRA)	Cofidis	4h 04' 45"
2	Rein Taaramäe (EST)	Cofidis	s.t.
3	Joaquim Rodríguez (ESP)	Team Katusha	s.t.
4	David Loosli (SUI)	Lampre–Farnese Vini	s.t.
5	Aitor Galdós (ESP)	Euskaltel–Euskadi	s.t.
6	Andreas Klöden (GER)	Team RadioShack	s.t.
7	Roman Kreuziger (CZE)	Liquigas–Doimo	s.t.
8	Luis León Sánchez (ESP)	Caisse d'Epargne	s.t.
9	Paolo Tiralongo (ITA)	Astana	s.t.
10	Ryder Hesjedal (CAN)	Garmin–Transitions	s.t.

General Classification after Stage 6

	Cyclist	Team	Time
1	Joaquim Rodríguez (ESP)	Team Katusha	22h 43' 42"
2	Xavier Tondó (ESP)	Cervélo TestTeam	+ 10"
3	Rein Taaramäe (EST)	Cofidis	+ 43"
4	Luis León Sánchez (ESP)	Caisse d'Epargne	+ 45"
5	Nicolas Roche (IRE)	Ag2r–La Mondiale	+ 1' 20"
6	Ryder Hesjedal (CAN)	Garmin–Transitions	+ 1' 20"
7	Michel Kreder (NED)	Garmin–Transitions	+ 1' 21"
8	Roman Kreuziger (CZE)	Liquigas–Doimo	+ 1' 22"
9	Janez Brajkovič (SLO)	Team RadioShack	+ 1' 25"
10	Rémy Di Gregorio (FRA)	Française des Jeux	+ 1' 26"

=== Stage 7 ===
28 March 2010, Sant Cugat del Vallès to Montmeló (Circuit de Catalunya), 117.8 km (73.2 mi)

This stage was flat, concluding with eight laps on the Circuit de Catalunya in Montmeló.

The field stayed together through most of this stage. All but 20 riders were together for a bunched sprint, won by Juan José Haedo. His brother Sebastian Haedo was his final lead-out man, and took fifth place in the sprint. There was again no change to the overall standings after this stage; Joaquim Rodríguez, Xavier Tondó, and Rein Taaramäe finished on the event's final podium.

Stage 7 Result

	Cyclist	Team	Time
1	Juan José Haedo (ARG)	Team Saxo Bank	2h 32' 21"
2	Robert Förster (GER)	Team Milram	s.t.
3	Nicolas Roche (IRE)	Ag2r–La Mondiale	s.t.
4	Davide Viganò (ITA)	Team Sky	s.t.
5	Sebastian Haedo (ARG)	Team Saxo Bank	s.t.
6	Aitor Galdós (ESP)	Euskaltel–Euskadi	s.t.
7	Manuel Cardoso (POR)	Footon–Servetto–Fuji	s.t.
8	Paul Voss (GER)	Team Milram	s.t.
9	Andreas Stauff (GER)	Quick-Step	s.t.
10	David Loosli (SUI)	Lampre–Farnese Vini	s.t.

Final General Classification

	Cyclist	Team	Time
1	Joaquim Rodríguez (ESP)	Team Katusha	25h 16' 03"
2	Xavier Tondó (ESP)	Cervélo TestTeam	+ 10"
3	Rein Taaramäe (EST)	Cofidis	+ 43"
4	Luis León Sánchez (ESP)	Caisse d'Epargne	+ 45"
5	Nicolas Roche (IRE)	Ag2r–La Mondiale	+ 1' 20"
6	Ryder Hesjedal (CAN)	Garmin–Transitions	+ 1' 20"
7	Michel Kreder (NED)	Garmin–Transitions	+ 1' 21"
8	Roman Kreuziger (CZE)	Liquigas–Doimo	+ 1' 22"
9	Janez Brajkovič (SLO)	Team RadioShack	+ 1' 25"
10	Rémy Di Gregorio (FRA)	Française des Jeux	+ 1' 26"

== Classification leadership ==
In the 2010 Volta a Catalunya, three different jerseys were awarded. For the general classification, calculated by adding the finishing times of the stages per cyclist, the leader received a white jersey with green stripes on the sleeves. This classification is considered the most important of the Volta a Catalunya, and the winner of the general classification is considered the winner of the Volta a Catalunya.

Additionally, there was also a sprint classification, indicated with a blue jersey. In the sprint classification, cyclists got points for being one of the first three in intermediate sprints, with six points awarded for first place, four for second, and two for third.

There was also a mountains classification, indicated with a red jersey. In the mountains classifications, points were won by reaching the top of a mountain before other cyclists. All climbs were categorized, with most either first, second, or third-category, with more points available for the higher-categorized climbs.

Stage	Winner	General Classification	Mountains Classification	Sprint Classification	Team Classification
1	Paul Voss	Paul Voss	no award	no award	Team RadioShack
2	Mark Cavendish	Paul Voss	Peter Stetina	Jonathan Castroviejo	Team RadioShack
3	Xavier Tondó	Joaquim Rodríguez	David Gutiérrez Gutiérrez	Jonathan Castroviejo	Team Katusha
4	Jens Voigt	Joaquim Rodríguez	David Gutiérrez Gutiérrez	Jonathan Castroviejo	Team Katusha
5	Davide Malacarne	Joaquim Rodríguez	David Gutiérrez Gutiérrez	Jonathan Castroviejo	Team Katusha
6	Samuel Dumoulin	Joaquim Rodríguez	David Gutiérrez Gutiérrez	Jonathan Castroviejo	Team Katusha
7	Juan José Haedo	Joaquim Rodríguez	David Gutiérrez Gutiérrez	Jonathan Castroviejo	Team Katusha
Final		Joaquim Rodríguez	David Gutiérrez Gutiérrez	Jonathan Castroviejo	Team Katusha
