= Martin Faiers =

British deprogrammer

Martin Faiers (born c. 1954) is a British deprogrammer and former official in the Unification Church in Canada. He was born in Grimsby, Lincolnshire. His family members are publishers of This England, a quarterly magazine about small-town and country England. According to scholar Elisabeth Arweck, Faiers lives in southern France and works in the Spanish deprogramming "market." In addition to being a deprogrammer, he also organized for several years a UK organization called Council on Mind Abuse.

== Unification Church and being deprogrammed ==
Faiers moved to Canada in 1976 for business purposes related to This England, which has a large readership among British expatriates in Commonwealth nations. He joined the Unification Church in 1978. Faiers was director of the Unification Church's Toronto training center, which made him de facto second-in-command of the Unification Church in Toronto. It is unknown when he first came to the position, but on 8 February 1980, his family had Erica Heftman, an American deprogrammer from California, deprogram Faiers. Around 10 February 1980, Faiers reportedly decided to return to England after discussing with Heftman. Faiers's family went to the Toronto training center to retrieve Faiers's passport, but it was lost. Martin Faiers used his older brother Philip's passport to return to the United Kingdom. By at least 1984, Faiers moved to southern France from Britain.

== Deprogramming activities ==
In 1984, 22-year-old Andrew Dobie joined the Church of Scientology in the United Kingdom while attending college. After inheriting £200,000, Dobie bought £90,000 of signed literature of L. Ron Hubbard, the founder of Scientology, as well as £10,000 for Dianetics and other self-improvement courses through the Church. Dobie's family spent £10,000 to hire Faiers in late 1985 to deprogram him after Dobie tearfully demanded another £53,000 to pay the Church of Scientology.

In mid-to-late 1984, Faiers reportedly deprogrammed Sehra Mohammed (born Caroline Banks), a woman who converted to Islam in Britain. Three people – Doris Bank, a real estate agent and Mohammed's mother; Keith Rose, a company director; and David Grey, an unemployed person – were charged with "conspiring to forcibly abduct Mrs Mohammed against her will between June 1 and October 29, 1984," according to The Guardian correspondent Walter Schwarz. Scotland Yard sought to interview Faiers for his participation in the deprogramming, though he was not charged with anything.

== See also ==
- Anti-cult movement
- Deprogramming
- Scientology
- Unification Church
