= This England (magazine) =

Magazine published in England

- Editor: Heather Grimes
- Categories: General interest magazine
- Frequency: Quarterly
- Circulation: c. 40,000
- Founder: Roy Faiers
- First issue: 1968
- Company: Kelsey Media
- Country: United Kingdom
- Language: English
- Website: shop.kelsey.co.uk/this-england-magazine

This England is a quarterly magazine published in England from 1968. It has a large readership among expatriates. It concentrates on the traditional values and customs of the English people, particularly those of rural and small-town England.

== History ==
The magazine was started in 1968 by Roy Faiers of Lincolnshire, who held it as a private company (This England International Ltd.). Faiers remained editor-in-chief until 2009, when he sold the company to DC Thomson, owners of the Sunday Post, Beano, Dandy, The People's Friend, My Weekly and other publications. Faiers was succeeded as editor by his former deputy editor, Stephen Garnett, who in turn was succeeded by Isboel King and then Angela Linforth. Since being purchased by Kelsey Media the publisher has yet to announce the new current editor.

The name This England comes from the declamations of John of Gaunt in Act II, Scene I of Shakespeare's King Richard II: "This royal throne of kings, this sceptred isle... This blessed plot, this earth, this realm, this England."

In January 2025, DC Thomson announced that This England would cease publication. However, the title was subsequently sold to Kentish media company Kelsey Media.

== Content ==
The magazine started with the slogan "As refreshing as a cup of tea!" Current issues describe themselves as "For all who love our green and pleasant land".

This England is an apolitical celebration of England's people, places, art and culture. Content focuses on England's past and present, with regular feature strands including "Historic Homes of England"; "The Prime Ministers" which looks back on Britain's former PMs, and "Explore England", which provides a travel itinerary for pockets of the country in each issue. "Great Britons" focuses on England's exceptional characters past and present; "Made in England" celebrates current English makers, and "Heritage Church" features a range of English churches.

Although Jeremy Paxman once remarked in his book The English that the magazine's greatest enemy was "the march of time", claiming that "not one article in the magazine looks forward to the future", that has changed more recently.

As well as its regular features, the magazine also has one-off features on anything from the birth of aviation, to highway women, to England's first tea plantation.
