= Johnnie Walker (cyclist) =

Australian cyclist (born 1987)

Personal information
- Born: 17 March 1987 (age 39) Sale, Victoria, Australia

Cycling career
- Sport: Cycling
- Discipline: Road
- Role: Rider

Professional teams
- 2007–2008: Southaustralia.com–AIS
- 2009: Trek–Marco Polo (until 6/30)
- 2010: Footon–Servetto
- 2011: V Australia
- 2013: Drapac Pro Cycling

Johnnie Walker (born 17 March 1987 in Sale, Victoria) is an Australian cyclist.

== Palmares ==
2009
1st Circuito Nuestra Señora del Portal
2nd GP Eduardo González
3rd Trofeo Virgen de Valencia
2010
2nd Tour of Hainan
