= Giampaolo Cheula =

Italian cyclist

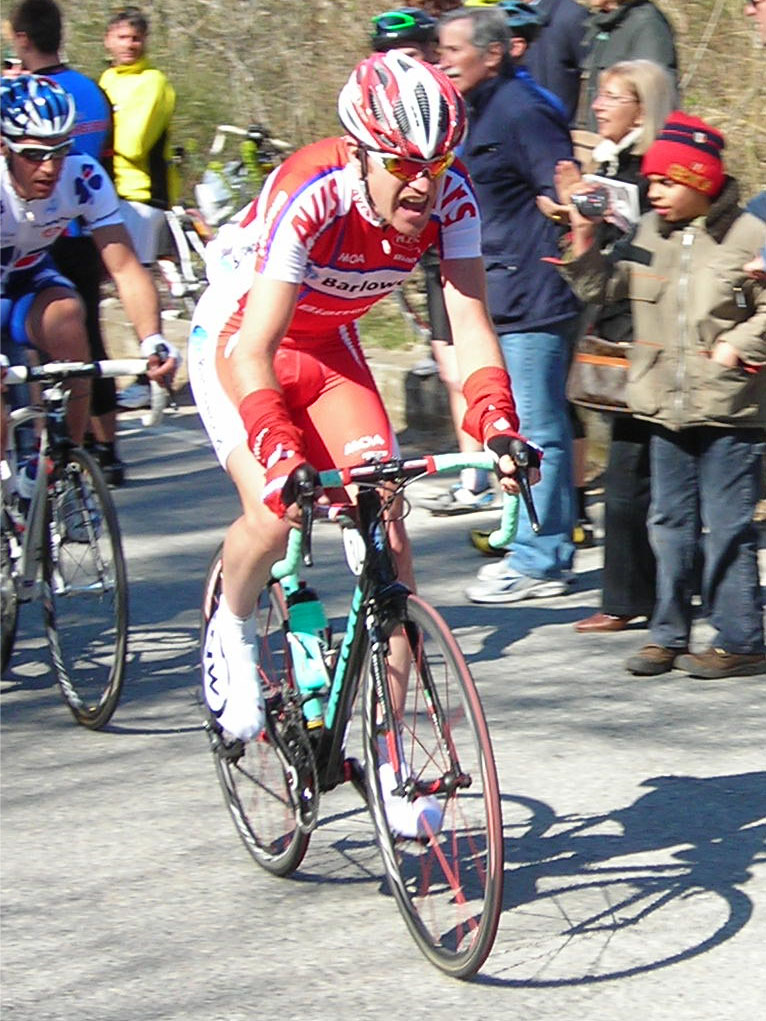

Personal information
- Full name: Giampaolo Cheula
- Born: 23 May 1979 (age 47) Premosello-Chiovenda, Italy

Cycling career
- Sport: Cycling
- Discipline: Road
- Role: Rider

Amateur team
- 2012: Team KTM–Stihl Torrevilla

Professional teams
- 2001–2002: Mapei–Quick-Step
- 2003–2004: Vini Caldirola–So.di
- 2005–2009: Barloworld
- 2010–2011: Footon–Servetto–Fuji

Major wins
- Peace Race (2006)

Giampaolo Cheula (born 23 May 1979 in Premosello-Chiovenda) is an Italian former professional racing cyclist. After retiring from road cycling in 2011, Cheula raced as a mountain biker for a year. Cheula was professional from 2001 until 2011, for teams Mapei–Quick-Step, Vini Caldirola–Nobili Rubinetterie, Barloworld and Geox–TMC.

== Major results ==
2000
1st Overall Flèche du Sud

1st Stage 2

3rd Trofeo Alcide Degasperi
2002
1st Overall Circuit de Lorraine

1st Stage 1

1st Stage 3 Bayern Rundfahrt
10th Tour du Lac Léman
2004
3rd Giro d'Oro
6th Trofeo Matteotti
7th Overall Bayern Rundfahrt

1st Mountains classification

2005
2nd Tour de Berne
3rd Overall Vuelta a Asturias
2006
1st Overall Peace Race
4th GP Llodio
4th GP Industria & Artigianato di Larciano
6th Trofeo Laigueglia
2007
5th Subida al Naranco
2008
1st GP Nobili Rubinetterie
9th Ronde van Drenthe
2009
8th Tre Valli Varesine
2010
3rd Gran Premio di Lugano
4th Overall Tour of Turkey
8th Overall Vuelta a la Comunidad de Madrid
2011
6th Overall Tour of Elk Grove

=== Grand Tour general classification results timeline ===
Grand Tour	2003	2004	2005	2006	2007	2008	2009	2010	2011
Giro d'Italia	62	—	—	—	—	—	101	DNF	97
Tour de France	—	—	—	—	111	88	—	—	—
Vuelta a España	107	—	—	—	—	—	—	86	—

Legend
—	Did not compete
DNF	Did not finish
