= Pedro Merino =

Spanish cyclist

Personal information
- Full name: Pedro Merino Criado
- Born: 8 July 1987 (age 39) Manzanares, Spain

Cycling career
- Sport: Cycling
- Discipline: Road
- Role: Rider

Amateur teams
- 2007: Saunier Duval–Prodir Amateur
- 2008: Burgos Monumental
- 2009: Fuji–Servetto (stagiaire)
- 2013: Mutua de Levante–Delikia–Cafemax
- 2014–2017: Super Froiz

Professional teams
- 2010: Footon–Servetto–Fuji
- 2011: Miche–Guerciotti
- 2012: Gios–Deyser Leon Kastro

Pedro Merino Criado (born 8 July 1987, in Manzanares) is a Spanish former professional cyclist.

== Major results ==
2005
1st Stage 1 Vuelta al Besaya
2008
5th Gran Premio Inda
8th Trofeo Franco Balestra
2009
1st Road race, National Under-23 Road Championships
4th Overall Grand Prix du Portugal
2010
9th Prueba Villafranca de Ordizia
2012
6th Prueba Villafranca de Ordizia
