= Noé Gianetti =

Swiss cyclist

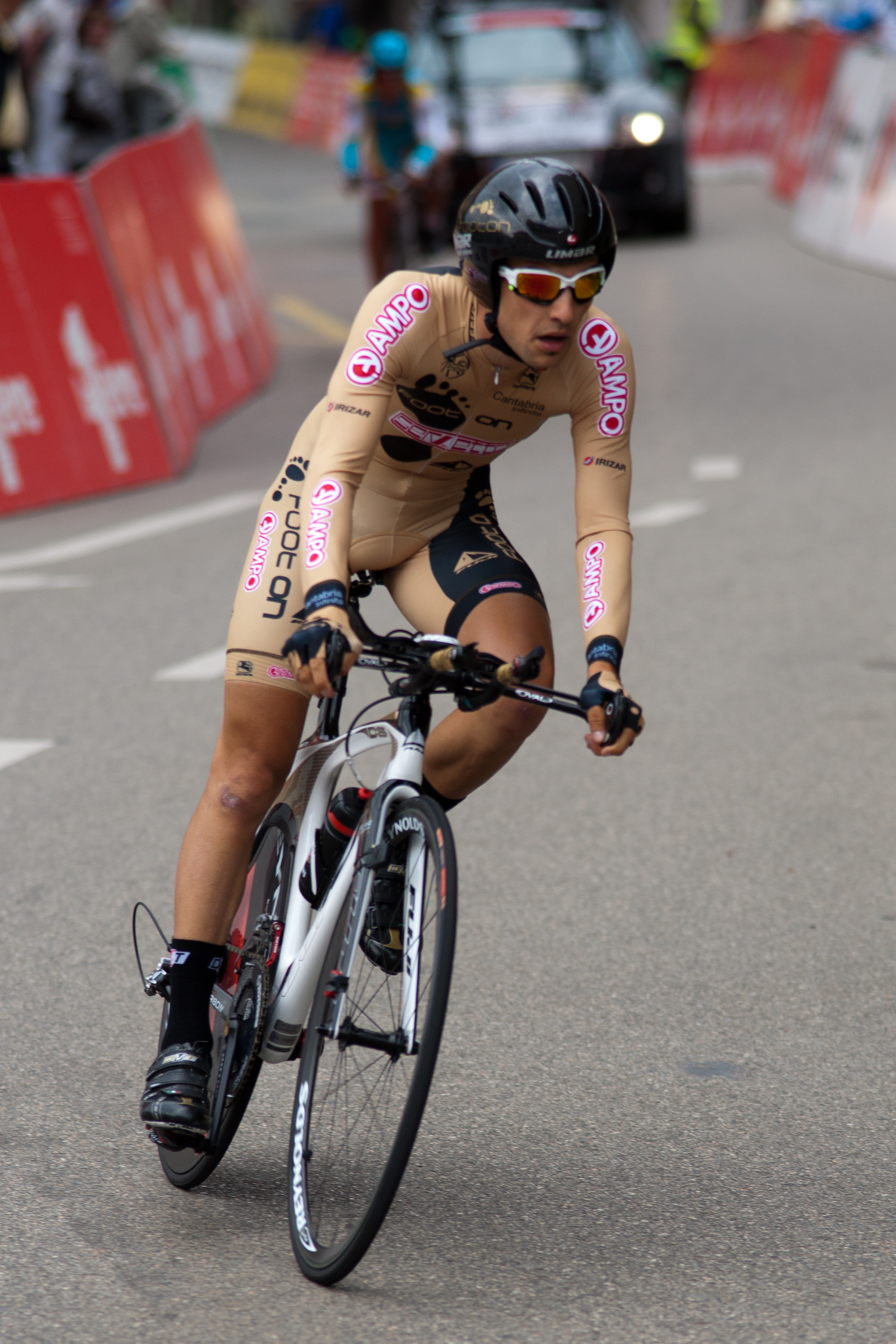
- Gianetti at the 2010 Tour de Romandie

Personal information
- Born: 6 October 1989 (age 37) Lavertezzo, Switzerland

Cycling career
- Sport: Cycling
- Discipline: Road
- Role: Rider

Amateur team
- 2009: VC Mendrisio

Professional teams
- 2010–2011: Footon–Servetto–Fuji
- 2012: Team Exergy

Noé Gianetti (born 6 October 1989 in Lavertezzo) is a Swiss former professional racing cyclist. His father Mauro was also a professional cyclist.

== Major results ==
2006
1st Stage 2 Vuelta al Besaya
2012
1st Chur–Arosa
