= Marco Corti =

Italian cyclist

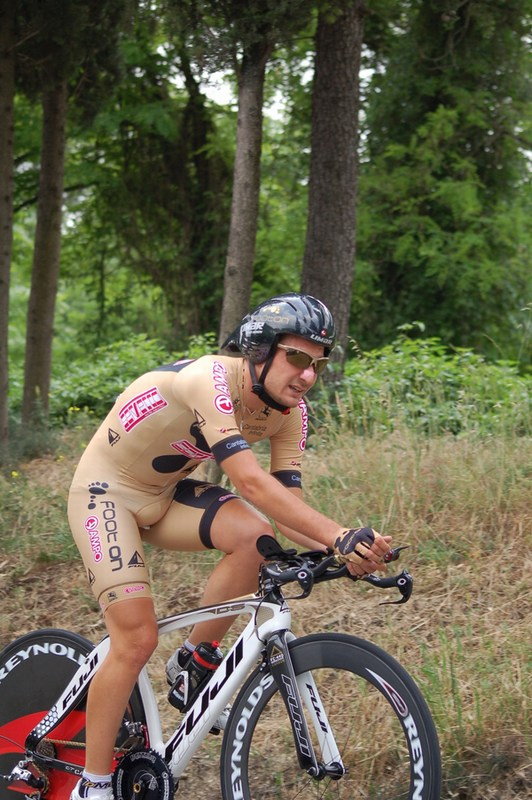

Personal information
- Full name: Marco Corti
- Born: 2 April 1986 Bergamo, Italy

Cycling career
- Sport: Cycling
- Discipline: Road
- Role: Rider

Professional teams
- 2005: Bergamasca Cremasca
- 2006: → Barloworld (stagiaire)
- 2008–2009: Barloworld
- 2010–2011: Footon–Servetto–Fuji
- 2011: Geox–TMC
- 2012–2013: Colombia–Coldeportes

Marco Corti (born 2 April 1986) is an Italian professional racing cyclist, who last rode for UCI Professional Continental team Colombia. He is the son of the former professional cyclist Claudio Corti.
