= David Gutiérrez Palacios =

Spanish cyclist

Personal information
- Born: 18 July 1987 (age 39) Madrid, Spain

Cycling career
- Sport: Cycling
- Current team: Retired
- Discipline: Road
- Role: Rider

Professional team
- 2010: Saunier Duval–Prodir

David Gutiérrez Palacios (born 28 July 1987 in Madrid) is a Spanish racing cyclist. He is the brother of Iván Gutiérrez.

== Palmarès ==
2008
U23 National Road Race Champion
2009
6th Vuelta Ciclista a León
2011
3rd Adziondo Klasica
