= Arkaitz Durán =

Spanish cyclist

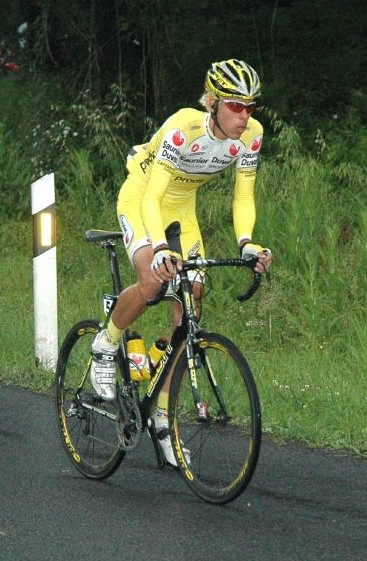
- Durán in the 2006 Euskal Bizikleta

Personal information
- Full name: Arkaitz Durán Aroca
- Born: 19 May 1986 (age 40) Vitoria-Gasteiz, Spain
- Height: 1.85 m (6 ft 1 in)
- Weight: 70 kg (154 lb)

Cycling career
- Sport: Cycling
- Current team: Retired
- Discipline: Road
- Role: Rider

Amateur team
- 2012: Telco'm–Conor Azysa

Professional teams
- 2005–2011: Saunier Duval–Prodir
- 2013: Efapel–Glassdrive
- 2014: OFM–Quinta da Lixa
- 2015: Efapel

Arkaitz Durán Aroca (born 19 May 1986) is a Spanish former professional road bicycle racer. He competed professionally from 2005 to 2015 for Saunier Duval–Prodir, Efapel–Glassdrive and OFM–Quinta da Lixa, and as an amateur in 2012 for Telco'm–Conor Azysa. Durán never had any victories as a professional.

== Major results ==
2002
3rd National Junior Cyclo-Cross Championships
2009
9th Subida a Urkiola
2011
2nd Trofeo Inca
2012
1st Overall Vuelta a Cantabria
1st Stages 4 & 5 Vuelta a Navarra
1st Stage 3 Tour of Galicia
1st Subida a Urraki
8th Overall Vuelta Ciclista a León
2013
6th Overall Vuelta a Asturias
2014
2nd Overall Grande Prémio Abimota

1st Prologue

=== Grand Tour general classification results timeline ===
Grand Tour	2007	2008	2009	2010
Giro d'Italia	—	—	—	—
Tour de France	—	—	—	81
Vuelta a España	DNF	—	40	DNF

Legend
—	Did not compete
DNF	Did not finish
