= Thomas Faiers =

British cyclist

Personal information
- Born: 19 May 1987 (age 39) Cheltenham, Great Britain
- Weight: 70 kg (150 lb)

Cycling career
- Sport: Cycling
- Discipline: Road
- Role: Rider
- Rider type: Climber

Professional teams
- 2010: Footon–Servetto–Fuji
- 2011: Wonderful Pistachios

Thomas Patrick Faiers (born 19 April 1987) is an English former professional road racing cyclist. He rode one professional season with UCI ProTour team Saunier Duval–Prodir.

== Palmares ==
2009
8th U23 Vuelta Madrid
1st U23 Championship of Asturias
1st Elite U23 GP Orgario
1st Elite U23 GP Cantabria.
1st GP San Miguel
1st Vuelta a Oriente
