= David Gutiérrez Gutiérrez =

Spanish bicycle racer

Personal information
- Full name: David Gutiérrez Gutiérrez
- Born: 2 April 1982 (age 44) Las Palmas, Canary Islands, Spain

Cycling career
- Sport: Cycling
- Current team: Retired
- Discipline: Road
- Role: Rider

Amateur team
- 2009: Camargo–Ferroatlántica

Professional teams
- 2010–2011: Footon–Servetto–Fuji
- 2012–2013: Onda

David Gutiérrez Gutiérrez (born 2 April 1982) is a Spanish former professional cyclist.

== Major results ==
2004
1st Overall Semana Aragonesca

1st Stage 3

2005
1st Stage 2 Volta de Castello
1st Stage 1 Vuelta a Salnes
1st Stage 2 Vuelta a Cantabria
2006
1st Overall Vuelta a Salamanca

1st Stage 2

1st Stage 3 Volta a Tarragona
1st Stage 5 Vuelta Ciclista a León
2007
1st Overall Vuelta a Zamora
1st Stage 3 Volta de Castello
1st Stage 2 Tour of Galicia
1st Stage 4 Copa Iberica
1st Stage 3 Vuelta a Salamanca
2008
1st Stage 3 Volta a Coruña
1st Stage 2 Volta a Tarragona
1st Stage 5 Semana Aragonesca
2009
1st Memorial Avelino Camacho
1st Stage 2 Volta da Ascension
1st Stage 5 Circuito Montañés
1st Stage 1 Vuelta a Segovia
1st Stage 1 Vuelta a Zamora
1st Stage 1 Vuelta a Salamanca
