= Aitor Pérez =

Spanish cyclist

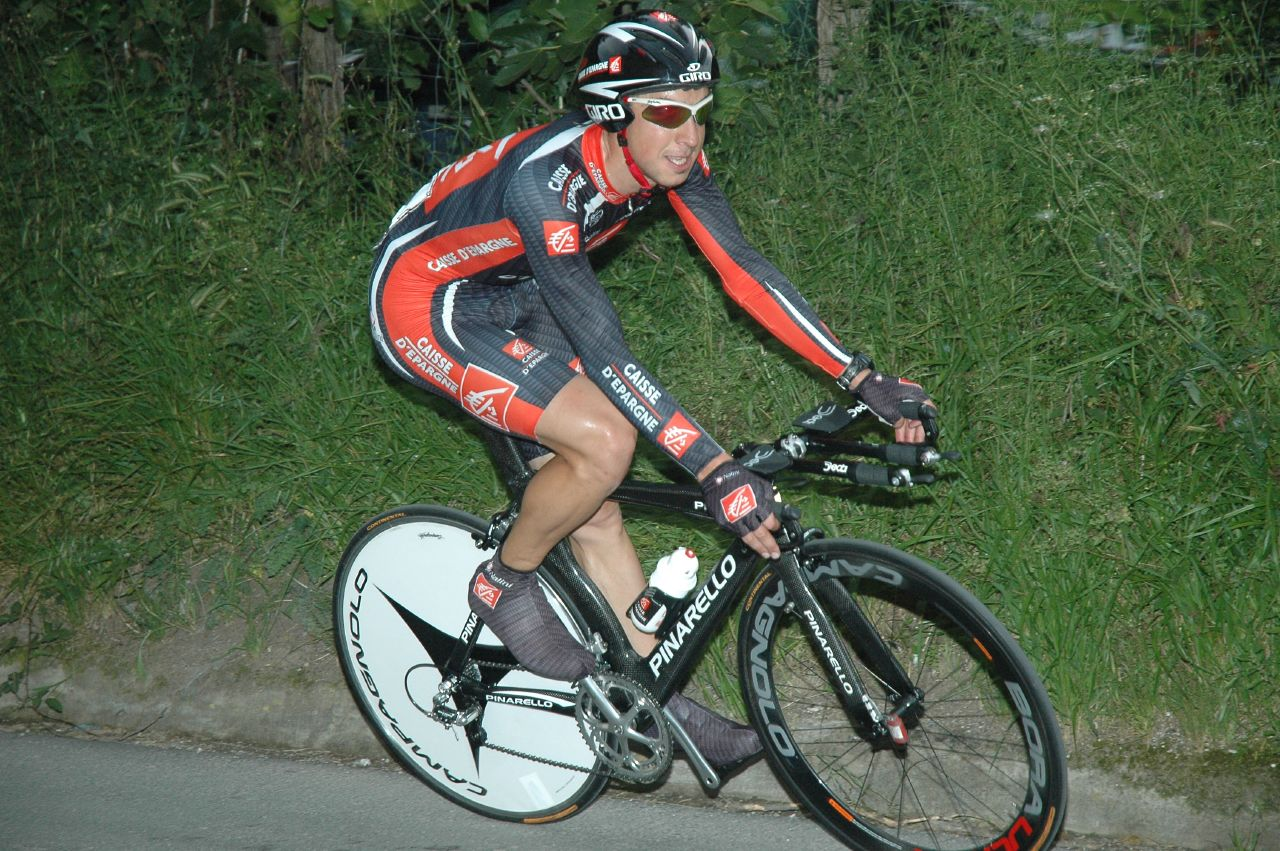

Personal information
- Full name: Aitor Pérez Arrieta
- Born: 24 July 1977 (age 49) Zegama, Spain
- Height: 1.83 m (6 ft 0 in)
- Weight: 70 kg (154 lb)

Cycling career
- Sport: Cycling
- Current team: Gios Deyser-Leon Kastro
- Discipline: Road
- Role: Rider

Amateur teams
- 2001: Caja Rural
- 2003: Cafes Baque

Professional teams
- 2004: Cafes Baque
- 2005: Spiuk
- 2006–2007: Caisse d'Epargne–Illes Balears
- 2008–2009: Extremadura-Spiuk
- 2010: Footon–Servetto–Fuji
- 2011: Lampre–ISD
- 2012–: Gios Deyser-Leon Kastro

Aitor Pérez Arrieta (born 24 July 1977) is a Spanish professional road bicycle racer who currently rides for the Gios Deyser-Leon Kastro team. Pérez has also ridden for UCI ProTour teams Caisse d'Epargne–Illes Balears, Footon–Servetto–Fuji and Lampre–ISD.

== Major results ==
- 2007 Giro d'Italia – 32nd
- GP Internacional do Oeste RTP – 1 stage (2005)
