= 2003 Tour de France, Prologue to Stage 9 =

Cycling race stages

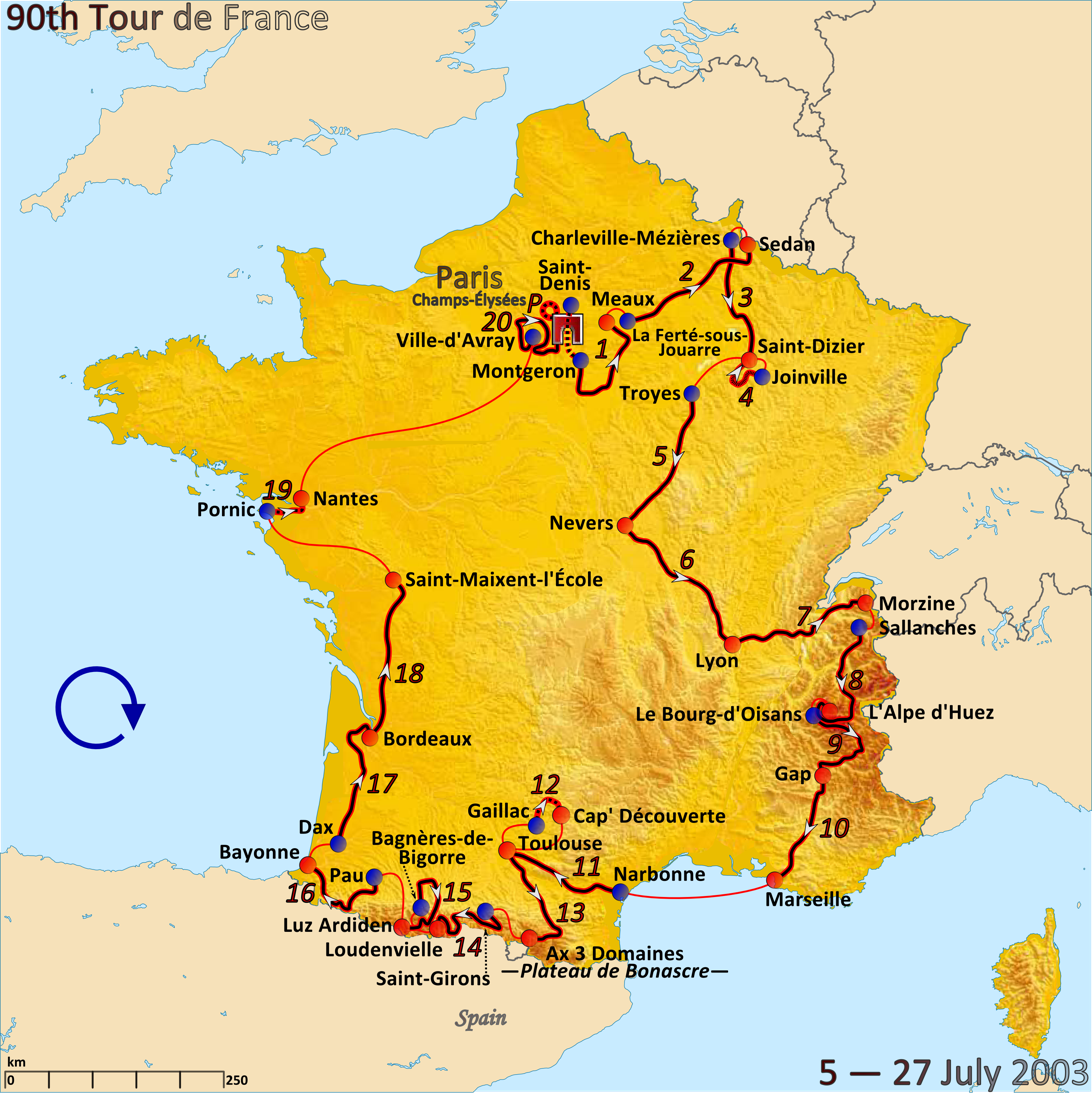
Route of the 2003 Tour de France

The 2003 Tour de France was the 90th edition of Tour de France, one of cycling's Grand Tours. The Tour began in Paris with a prologue individual time trial on 5 July and Stage 9 occurred on 14 July with a mountainous stage to Gap. The race finished on the Champs-Élysées, back in Paris, on 27 July.

== Prologue ==
5 July 2003 — Paris, 6.5 km (4.0 mi) (ITT)

The opening stage was a short time trial. Covering just 6.5 km the route started under the Eiffel Tower, crossed the river, out to the Place de la Concorde and then back for a finish near to the start.

The trial was won by Bradley McGee of FDJeux edging out Scot, David Millar, by 0.1 seconds after Millar had briefly lost his chain in the last 500 metres. Haimar Zubeldia had set the early pace and held onto first place almost to the end.

Because the Tour was the centennial tour, Armstrong broke with his usual tradition and agreed to begin wearing the yellow jersey. Typically, he prefers to earn each wearing of the jersey himself. This led to one of the rare times that Armstrong has lost the yellow jersey, with it going to Bradley McGee.

Prologue result and general classification after prologue

Rank	Rider	Team	Time
1	Bradley McGee (AUS)	FDJeux.com	7' 26.16"
2	David Millar (GBR)	Cofidis	+ 0.08"
3	Haimar Zubeldia (ESP)	Euskaltel–Euskadi	+ 2.09"
4	Jan Ullrich (GER)	Team Bianchi	+ 2.11"
5	Víctor Hugo Peña (COL)	U.S. Postal Service	+ 6.08"
6	Tyler Hamilton (USA)	Team CSC	+ 6.27"
~~7~~	~~Lance Armstrong (USA)~~	~~U.S. Postal Service~~	~~+ 7.39"~~
8	Joseba Beloki (ESP)	ONCE–Eroski	+ 9.17"
9	Santiago Botero (COL)	Team Telekom	+ 9.24"
10	Viatcheslav Ekimov (RUS)	U.S. Postal Service	+ 10.86"

== Stage 1 ==
6 July 2003 — Saint-Denis to Meaux, 168 km (104.4 mi)

This stage entailed a flat 168 km looping south to Montgeron before heading back north to the village of Meaux.

As expected the race ended in a sprint. An early three man breakaway built up a lead of almost nine minutes before the big teams chased them down, the final man, Andy Flickinger, being caught with 11 km to go. A massive crash in the last kilometre brought down around 140 riders but most of the main sprinters made it through. Alessandro Petacchi of Fassa Bortolo won his first ever stage, beating Robbie McEwen and Erik Zabel in the final metres.

Tyler Hamilton, considered by many to be one of the strongest contenders for overall victory, broke his collarbone in two places in the crash, and was widely reported to have dropped out of the race, though this turned out to be inaccurate, and he went on to win fourth. Levi Leipheimer, however, who was also considered a major contender, did drop out, as did his Dutch teammate from Rabobank, Marc Lotz. Armstrong was involved in the crash, but was relatively uninjured, although he had to borrow a teammate's bike to finish the stage. Since the crash was within 1 km of the finish, all of the riders involved got the same time as the rest of the peloton.

Stage 1 result

Rank	Rider	Team	Time
1	Alessandro Petacchi (ITA)	Fassa Bortolo	3h 44' 33"
2	Robbie McEwen (AUS)	Lotto–Domo	s.t.
3	Erik Zabel (GER)	Team Telekom	s.t.
4	Paolo Bettini (ITA)	Quick-Step–Davitamon	s.t.
5	Baden Cooke (AUS)	FDJeux.com	s.t.
6	Thor Hushovd (NOR)	Crédit Agricole	s.t.
7	Óscar Freire (ESP)	Rabobank	s.t.
8	Luca Paolini (ITA)	Quick-Step–Davitamon	s.t.
9	Romāns Vainšteins (LAT)	Vini Caldirola–So.Di	s.t.
10	Jaan Kirsipuu (EST)	AG2R Prévoyance	s.t.

Points classification after Stage 1

Rank	Rider	Team	Points
1	Robbie McEwen (AUS)	Lotto–Domo	36
2	Alessandro Petacchi (ITA)	Fassa Bortolo	35
3	Erik Zabel (GER)	Team Telekom	26

General classification after stage 1

Rank	Rider	Team	Time
1	Bradley McGee (AUS)	FDJeux.com	3h 51' 55"
2	David Millar (GBR)	Cofidis	+ 4"
3	Haimar Zubeldia (ESP)	Euskaltel–Euskadi	+ 6"
4	Jan Ullrich (GER)	Team Bianchi	s.t.
5	Víctor Hugo Peña (COL)	U.S. Postal Service	+ 10"
6	Tyler Hamilton (USA)	Team CSC	s.t.
7	Andy Flickinger (FRA)	AG2R Prévoyance	s.t.
~~8~~	~~Lance Armstrong (USA)~~	~~U.S. Postal Service~~	~~+ 11"~~
9	Joseba Beloki (ESP)	ONCE–Eroski	+ 13"
10	Santiago Botero (COL)	Team Telekom	s.t.

Mountains classification after Stage 1

Rank	Rider	Team	Points
1	Christophe Mengin (FRA)	FDJeux.com	13
2	Walter Bénéteau (FRA)	Brioches La Boulangère	9
3	Andy Flickinger (FRA)	AG2R Prévoyance	5

== Stage 2 ==
7 July 2003 — La Ferté-sous-Jouarre to Sedan, 204 km (126.8 mi)

One of the longest stages of the 2003 race at 204.5 km, this was another mostly flat stage where the sprinters would be likely to excel. A few Category 4 climbs or smaller occurred in the first and last quarters of the race.

The race was similar to Stage 1. A very early breakaway by two riders, Lilian Jégou and Fréderic Finot, built up a lead of over eleven minutes, but their lead was diminished through the afternoon and after Jegou was dropped Finot was finally caught after a breakaway of almost 185 km. In the final mass sprint the Australia FDJeux rider Baden Cooke won, another debutant winner he just beat local rider Jean-Patrick Nazon. Contrary to news reports the day before, Tyler Hamilton did compete, although he came in nearly last.

One small bit of extra drama occurred when rider Frédéric Finot was almost run over by the car of race director Jean-Marie Leblanc. Finot avoided damage, but his bike was destroyed.

Stage 2 result

Rank	Rider	Team	Time
1	Baden Cooke (AUS)	FDJeux.com	5h 06' 33"
2	Jean-Patrick Nazon (FRA)	Brioches La Boulangère	s.t.
3	Jaan Kirsipuu (EST)	AG2R Prévoyance	s.t.
4	Erik Zabel (GER)	Team Telekom	s.t.
5	Thor Hushovd (NOR)	Crédit Agricole	s.t.
6	Robbie McEwen (AUS)	Lotto–Domo	s.t.
7	Paolo Bettini (ITA)	Quick-Step–Davitamon	s.t.
8	Stuart O'Grady (AUS)	Crédit Agricole	s.t.
9	Fred Rodriguez (USA)	Vini Caldirola–So.Di	s.t.
10	Mikel Artetxe (ESP)	Euskaltel–Euskadi	s.t.

Points classification after Stage 2

Rank	Rider	Team	Points
1	Robbie McEwen (AUS)	Lotto–Domo	58
2	Baden Cooke (AUS)	FDJeux.com	57
3	Erik Zabel (GER)	Team Telekom	50

General classification after stage 2

Rank	Rider	Team	Time
1	Bradley McGee (AUS)	FDJeux.com	8h 58' 28"
2	David Millar (GBR)	Cofidis	+ 4"
3	Baden Cooke (AUS)	FDJeux.com	s.t.
4	Haimar Zubeldia (ESP)	Euskaltel–Euskadi	+ 6"
5	Jan Ullrich (GER)	Team Bianchi	s.t.
6	Jean-Patrick Nazon (FRA)	Brioches La Boulangère	s.t.
7	Víctor Hugo Peña (COL)	U.S. Postal Service	+ 10"
8	Tyler Hamilton (USA)	Team CSC	s.t.
9	Andy Flickinger (FRA)	AG2R Prévoyance	s.t.
~~10~~	~~Lance Armstrong (USA)~~	~~U.S. Postal Service~~	~~+ 11"~~

Mountains classification after Stage 2

Rank	Rider	Team	Points
1	Christophe Mengin (FRA)	FDJeux.com	14
2	Walter Bénéteau (FRA)	Brioches La Boulangère	10
3	Frédéric Finot (FRA)	Jean Delatour	8

== Stage 3 ==
8 July 2003 — Charleville-Mézières to Saint-Dizier, 167 km (103.8 mi)

Another flat stage in northern France, 167.5 km including only one Category 4 climb and three intermediate sprints.

Unlike the two preceding stages, the repeated small breakaways were not allowed to build significant leads. The teams of the main sprinters, notably Jean Delatour, kept the race together to compete for the points and time bonuses of the intermediate sprints. High temperatures and high speeds kept the riders together until after the second sprint when Anthony Geslin makes a lone break. His lead reached a maximum of around 3½ minutes and he was caught with just 16 km to the finish. In a mass sprint Alessandro Petacchi claimed his second win, but Frenchman Jean-Patrick Nazon had won sufficient bonuses on the intermediate sprints to take the yellow jersey.

Stage 3 result

Rank	Rider	Team	Time
1	Alessandro Petacchi (ITA)	Fassa Bortolo	3h 27' 39"
2	Romāns Vainšteins (LAT)	Vini Caldirola–So.Di	s.t.
3	Óscar Freire (ESP)	Rabobank	s.t.
4	Erik Zabel (GER)	Team Telekom	s.t.
5	Robbie McEwen (AUS)	Lotto–Domo	s.t.
6	Luca Paolini (ITA)	Quick-Step–Davitamon	s.t.
7	Olaf Pollack (GER)	Gerolsteiner	s.t.
8	Angelo Furlan (ITA)	Alessio	s.t.
9	Salvatore Commesso (ITA)	Saeco	s.t.
10	Stuart O'Grady (AUS)	Crédit Agricole	s.t.

Points classification after Stage 3

Rank	Rider	Team	Points
1	Robbie McEwen (AUS)	Lotto–Domo	86
2	Erik Zabel (GER)	Team Telekom	74
3	Alessandro Petacchi (ITA)	Fassa Bortolo	72

General classification after stage 3

Rank	Rider	Team	Time
1	Jean-Patrick Nazon (FRA)	Brioches La Boulangère	12h 25' 59"
2	Bradley McGee (AUS)	FDJeux.com	+ 8"
3	David Millar (GBR)	Cofidis	+ 12"
4	Baden Cooke (AUS)	FDJeux.com	s.t.
5	Haimar Zubeldia (ESP)	Euskaltel–Euskadi	+ 14"
6	Jan Ullrich (GER)	Team Bianchi	s.t.
7	Jaan Kirsipuu (EST)	AG2R Prévoyance	+ 15"
8	Robbie McEwen (AUS)	Lotto–Domo	+ 18"
9	Víctor Hugo Peña (COL)	U.S. Postal Service	s.t.
10	Tyler Hamilton (USA)	Team CSC	s.t.

Mountains classification after Stage 3

Rank	Rider	Team	Points
1	Christophe Mengin (FRA)	FDJeux.com	15
2	Walter Bénéteau (FRA)	Brioches La Boulangère	10
3	Frédéric Finot (FRA)	Jean Delatour	8

== Stage 4 ==
9 July 2003 — Joinville to Saint-Dizier, 69 km (42.9 mi) (TTT)

Stage 4 was a team time trial – the riders ride together as a team, with the time of the fifth rider counting. This is considered by the riders to be one of the most difficult parts of road cycling, and is a controversial event thought by many to unfairly disadvantage teams that specialize in climbing.

The winner of the stage was the US Postal team of favorite Lance Armstrong. In the general classification, US Postal riders now held places one through eight, although Armstrong was only in second place, with teammate Víctor Hugo Peña in first. Peña was the first rider from Colombia to wear the yellow jersey, and won it the day before his birthday.

Of the other main contenders, Joseba Beloki, Jan Ullrich and Francisco Mancebo did not lose much time, but Gilberto Simoni and Iban Mayo lost 3 minutes.

Stage 4 result

Rank	Team	Time
1	U.S. Postal Service	1h 18' 27"
2	ONCE–Eroski	+ 30"
3	Team Bianchi	+ 43"
4	iBanesto.com	+ 1' 05"
5	Quick-Step–Davitamon	+ 1' 23"
6	Team Telekom	+ 1' 30"
7	Vini Caldirola–So.Di	+ 1' 32"
8	Crédit Agricole	s.t.
9	AG2R Prévoyance	+ 1' 38"
10	Team CSC	+ 1' 45"

General classification after stage 4

Rank	Rider	Team	Time
1	Víctor Hugo Peña (COL)	U.S. Postal Service	13h 44' 44"
~~2~~	~~Lance Armstrong (USA)~~	~~U.S. Postal Service~~	~~+ 1"~~
3	Viatcheslav Ekimov (RUS)	U.S. Postal Service	+ 5"
4	George Hincapie (USA)	U.S. Postal Service	s.t.
5	José Luis Rubiera (ESP)	U.S. Postal Service	+ 23"
6	Roberto Heras (ESP)	U.S. Postal Service	+ 27"
7	Pavel Padrnos (CZE)	U.S. Postal Service	s.t.
8	Floyd Landis (USA)	U.S. Postal Service	+ 28"
9	Joseba Beloki (ESP)	ONCE–Eroski	+ 33"
10	Jörg Jaksche (GER)	ONCE–Eroski	+ 38"

== Stage 5 ==
10 July 2003 — Troyes to Nevers, 196.5 km (122.1 mi)

After a fast start, a group of five riders, László Bodrogi, Nicolas Jalabert, Jens Voigt, Ludovic Turpin and Frédéric Finot, got away, but the gap never grew over 3 minutes, the teams of the sprinters keeping a high velocity on the peloton. Again the stage ends in a mass sprint, and again Petacchi manages to take it, showing himself the best sprinter in this year's Tour. Whether he is also the best sprinter overall remained questionable, since the team of Mario Cipollini was not invited to this year's Tour. The day ended with Peña still wearing yellow, and Armstrong still in second, one second behind.

Stage 5 result

Rank	Rider	Team	Time
1	Alessandro Petacchi (ITA)	Fassa Bortolo	4h 09' 47"
2	Jaan Kirsipuu (EST)	AG2R Prévoyance	s.t.
3	Baden Cooke (AUS)	FDJeux.com	s.t.
4	Erik Zabel (GER)	Team Telekom	s.t.
5	Robbie McEwen (AUS)	Lotto–Domo	s.t.
6	Luca Paolini (ITA)	Quick-Step–Davitamon	s.t.
7	Thor Hushovd (NOR)	Crédit Agricole	s.t.
8	Stuart O'Grady (AUS)	Crédit Agricole	s.t.
9	Fred Rodriguez (USA)	Vini Caldirola–So.Di	s.t.
10	Jean-Patrick Nazon (FRA)	Jean Delatour	s.t.

Points classification after Stage 5

Rank	Rider	Team	Points
1	Robbie McEwen (AUS)	Lotto–Domo	108
2	Alessandro Petacchi (ITA)	Fassa Bortolo	107
3	Erik Zabel (GER)	Team Telekom	98

General classification after stage 5

Rank	Rider	Team	Time
1	Víctor Hugo Peña (COL)	U.S. Postal Service	17h 54' 31"
~~2~~	~~Lance Armstrong (USA)~~	~~U.S. Postal Service~~	~~+ 1"~~
3	Viatcheslav Ekimov (RUS)	U.S. Postal Service	+ 5"
4	George Hincapie (USA)	U.S. Postal Service	s.t.
5	José Luis Rubiera (ESP)	U.S. Postal Service	+ 23"
6	Roberto Heras (ESP)	U.S. Postal Service	+ 27"
7	Pavel Padrnos (CZE)	U.S. Postal Service	s.t.
8	Floyd Landis (USA)	U.S. Postal Service	+ 28"
9	Joseba Beloki (ESP)	ONCE–Eroski	+ 33"
10	Jörg Jaksche (GER)	ONCE–Eroski	+ 38"

Mountains classification after Stage 5

Rank	Rider	Team	Points
1	Frédéric Finot (FRA)	Jean Delatour	18
2	Christophe Mengin (FRA)	FDJeux.com	15
3	Walter Bénéteau (FRA)	Brioches La Boulangère	10

== Stage 6 ==
11 July 2003 — Nevers to Lyon, 230 km (142.9 mi)

Lyon is the first of the six cities that was also visited in the first Tour de France in 1903, and thus this was one of the six stages involved in the one-off Centenaire competition. Stuart O'Grady and Anthony Geslin attacked, and seemed to finally be able to have a breakaway attempt succeed, their lead growing to 18 minutes, and still being 8 minutes with 50 kilometers to go, but the teams of the sprinters once again were successful in catching the attackers, only 500 meters before the finish. Once again Petacchi scored a convincing win in the sprint, and takes his fourth win in five normal stages! His latest win also gains him the green jersey of the points classification. Peña, meanwhile, remained in yellow, one second ahead of Armstrong. Petacchi, after winning four stages, finally got hold of the green jersey as leader of the points classification for the first time.

Stage 6 result

Rank	Rider	Team	Time
1	Alessandro Petacchi (ITA)	Fassa Bortolo	5h 08' 35"
2	Baden Cooke (AUS)	FDJeux.com	s.t.
3	Fabrizio Guidi (ITA)	Team Bianchi	s.t.
4	Thor Hushovd (NOR)	Crédit Agricole	s.t.
5	Romāns Vainšteins (LAT)	Vini Caldirola–So.Di	s.t.
6	Damien Nazon (FRA)	Brioches La Boulangère	s.t.
7	Sébastien Hinault (FRA)	Crédit Agricole	s.t.
8	Gerrit Glomser (AUT)	Saeco	s.t.
9	Yuriy Krivtsov (UKR)	Jean Delatour	s.t.
10	Luca Paolini (ITA)	Quick-Step–Davitamon	s.t.

Points classification after Stage 6

Rank	Rider	Team	Points
1	Alessandro Petacchi (ITA)	Fassa Bortolo	144
2	Baden Cooke (AUS)	FDJeux.com	118
3	Robbie McEwen (AUS)	Lotto–Domo	110

General classification after stage 6

Rank	Rider	Team	Time
1	Víctor Hugo Peña (COL)	U.S. Postal Service	23h 03' 06"
~~2~~	~~Lance Armstrong (USA)~~	~~U.S. Postal Service~~	~~+ 1"~~
3	Viatcheslav Ekimov (RUS)	U.S. Postal Service	+ 5"
4	George Hincapie (USA)	U.S. Postal Service	s.t.
5	José Luis Rubiera (ESP)	U.S. Postal Service	+ 23"
6	Roberto Heras (ESP)	U.S. Postal Service	+ 27"
7	Pavel Padrnos (CZE)	U.S. Postal Service	s.t.
8	Floyd Landis (USA)	U.S. Postal Service	+ 28"
9	Joseba Beloki (ESP)	ONCE–Eroski	+ 33"
10	Jörg Jaksche (GER)	ONCE–Eroski	+ 38"

Mountains classification after Stage 6

Rank	Rider	Team	Points
1	Christophe Mengin (FRA)	FDJeux.com	20
2	Frédéric Finot (FRA)	Jean Delatour	18
3	Anthony Geslin (FRA)	Brioches La Boulangère	15

== Stage 7 ==
12 July 2003 — Lyon to Morzine, 230.5 km (143.2 mi)

The first mountain stage, although not an extremely heavy one, with 5 climbs, of which one of the first category but none of the (even heavier) hors catégorie. On the first climb, Benoit Poîlvet, Paolo Bettini and Rolf Aldag attacked, later joined by Richard Virenque, the eventual winner of the polka dot jersey, who dropped the others one by one, and took the stage and the yellow jersey from Peña, who had declared in interviews prior to the race that he was going to start working for Lance to win. A group of 45 riders came in at 4 minutes behind Virenque. It contained most contenders for the general classification, but Gilberto Simoni and Santiago Botero were not in there, and lost over 6 minutes to Lance Armstrong and the others. After the first mountains, their chances in this year's tour seemed to be over already. Among the seven riders who dropped out during the stage, was Alessandro Petacchi, the wearer of the green jersey. Baden Cooke, who inherited the jersey after Petacchi's retirement, described Petacchi as "soft".

Stage 7 result

Rank	Rider	Team	Time
1	Richard Virenque (FRA)	Quick-Step–Davitamon	6h 06' 03"
2	Rolf Aldag (GER)	Team Telekom	+ 2' 29"
3	Sylvain Chavanel (FRA)	Brioches La Boulangère	+ 3' 45"
4	Michael Rogers (AUS)	Quick-Step–Davitamon	+ 4' 03"
5	Stefano Garzelli (ITA)	Vini Caldirola–So.Di	+ 4' 06"
6	Christophe Moreau (FRA)	Crédit Agricole	s.t.
7	Laurent Dufaux (SUI)	Alessio	s.t.
8	David Millar (GBR)	Cofidis	s.t.
9	Georg Totschnig (AUT)	Gerolsteiner	s.t.
10	Alexander Vinokourov (KAZ)	Team Telekom	s.t.

Points classification after Stage 7

Rank	Rider	Team	Points
1	Baden Cooke (AUS)	FDJeux.com	118
2	Robbie McEwen (AUS)	Lotto–Domo	110
3	Thor Hushovd (NOR)	Crédit Agricole	100

General classification after stage 7

Rank	Rider	Team	Time
1	Richard Virenque (FRA)	Quick-Step–Davitamon	29h 10' 39"
~~2~~	~~Lance Armstrong (USA)~~	~~U.S. Postal Service~~	~~+ 2' 37"~~
3	Rolf Aldag (GER)	Team Telekom	+ 2' 48"
4	José Luis Rubiera (ESP)	U.S. Postal Service	+ 2' 59"
5	Roberto Heras (ESP)	U.S. Postal Service	+ 3' 03"
6	Joseba Beloki (ESP)	ONCE–Eroski	+ 3' 09"
7	Jörg Jaksche (GER)	ONCE–Eroski	+ 3' 14"
8	Manuel Beltrán (ESP)	U.S. Postal Service	+ 3' 15"
9	Jan Ullrich (GER)	Team Bianchi	s.t.
10	José Azevedo (POR)	ONCE–Eroski	+ 3' 37"

Mountains classification after Stage 7

Rank	Rider	Team	Points
1	Richard Virenque (FRA)	Quick-Step–Davitamon	78
2	Rolf Aldag (GER)	Team Telekom	61
3	Benoît Poilvet (FRA)	Crédit Agricole	51

== Stage 8 ==
13 July 2003 — Sallanches to Alpe d'Huez, 219 km (136.1 mi)

The second day in the mountains was a long 219 km including the Col du Télégraphe, the Col du Galibier and a finish on the famous Alpe d'Huez. Richard Virenque was first over the initial climb and the peloton did not break-up until an early attack after the Cote de Megève split the peloton in two. The leading group contained most of the major names and produced a series of attacks, dropping contender Gilberto Simoni from the group early on, with Richard Virenque, Jan Ullrich, and Stefano Garzelli also getting dropped.

Eventually, Joseba Beloki launched an attack, and was eventually chased down by a breakaway pack consisting of Armstrong, Hamilton, Iban Mayo, and Haimar Zubeldia. Beloki was caught with 9 km to go, and Iban Mayo launched an attack, going on to win the stage; he could have won by quite a greater margin, but he slowed down on the last kilometer of Alpe d'Huez to celebrate the moment. Armstrong held off attacks from many riders, although Alexander Vinokourov managed to get away and take second. Armstrong won the sprint for third place, with the associated time bonus, giving him his first yellow jersey of the Tour, forty seconds ahead of Beloki, who was now looking to be a major challenger.

Stage 8 result

Rank	Rider	Team	Time
1	Iban Mayo (ESP)	Euskaltel–Euskadi	5h 57' 30"
2	Alexander Vinokourov (KAZ)	Team Telekom	+ 1' 45"
~~3~~	~~Lance Armstrong (USA)~~	~~U.S. Postal Service~~	~~+ 2' 12"~~
4	Francisco Mancebo (ESP)	iBanesto.com	s.t.
5	Haimar Zubeldia (ESP)	Euskaltel–Euskadi	s.t.
6	Joseba Beloki (ESP)	ONCE–Eroski	s.t.
7	Tyler Hamilton (USA)	Team CSC	s.t.
8	Ivan Basso (ITA)	Fassa Bortolo	s.t.
9	Roberto Laiseka (ESP)	Euskaltel–Euskadi	s.t.
10	Pietro Caucchioli (ITA)	Alessio	+ 3' 36"

Points classification after Stage 8

Rank	Rider	Team	Points
1	Baden Cooke (AUS)	FDJeux.com	120
2	Robbie McEwen (AUS)	Lotto–Domo	110
3	Thor Hushovd (NOR)	Crédit Agricole	104

General classification after stage 8

Rank	Rider	Team	Time
~~1~~	~~Lance Armstrong (USA)~~	~~U.S. Postal Service~~	~~35h 12' 50"~~
2	Joseba Beloki (ESP)	ONCE–Eroski	+ 40"
3	Iban Mayo (ESP)	Euskaltel–Euskadi	+ 1' 10"
4	Alexander Vinokourov (KAZ)	Team Telekom	+ 1' 17"
5	Francisco Mancebo (ESP)	iBanesto.com	+ 1' 37"
6	Tyler Hamilton (USA)	Team CSC	+ 1' 52"
7	Roberto Heras (ESP)	U.S. Postal Service	+ 1' 58"
8	Jan Ullrich (GER)	Team Bianchi	+ 2' 10"
9	Ivan Basso (ITA)	Fassa Bortolo	+ 2' 25"
10	Jörg Jaksche (GER)	ONCE–Eroski	+ 3' 19"

Mountains classification after Stage 8

Rank	Rider	Team	Points
1	Richard Virenque (FRA)	Quick-Step–Davitamon	134
~~2~~	~~Lance Armstrong (USA)~~	~~U.S. Postal Service~~	~~63~~
3	Francisco Mancebo (ESP)	iBanesto.com	61

== Stage 9 ==
14 July 2003 — Le Bourg-d'Oisans to Gap, 184.5 km (114.6 mi)

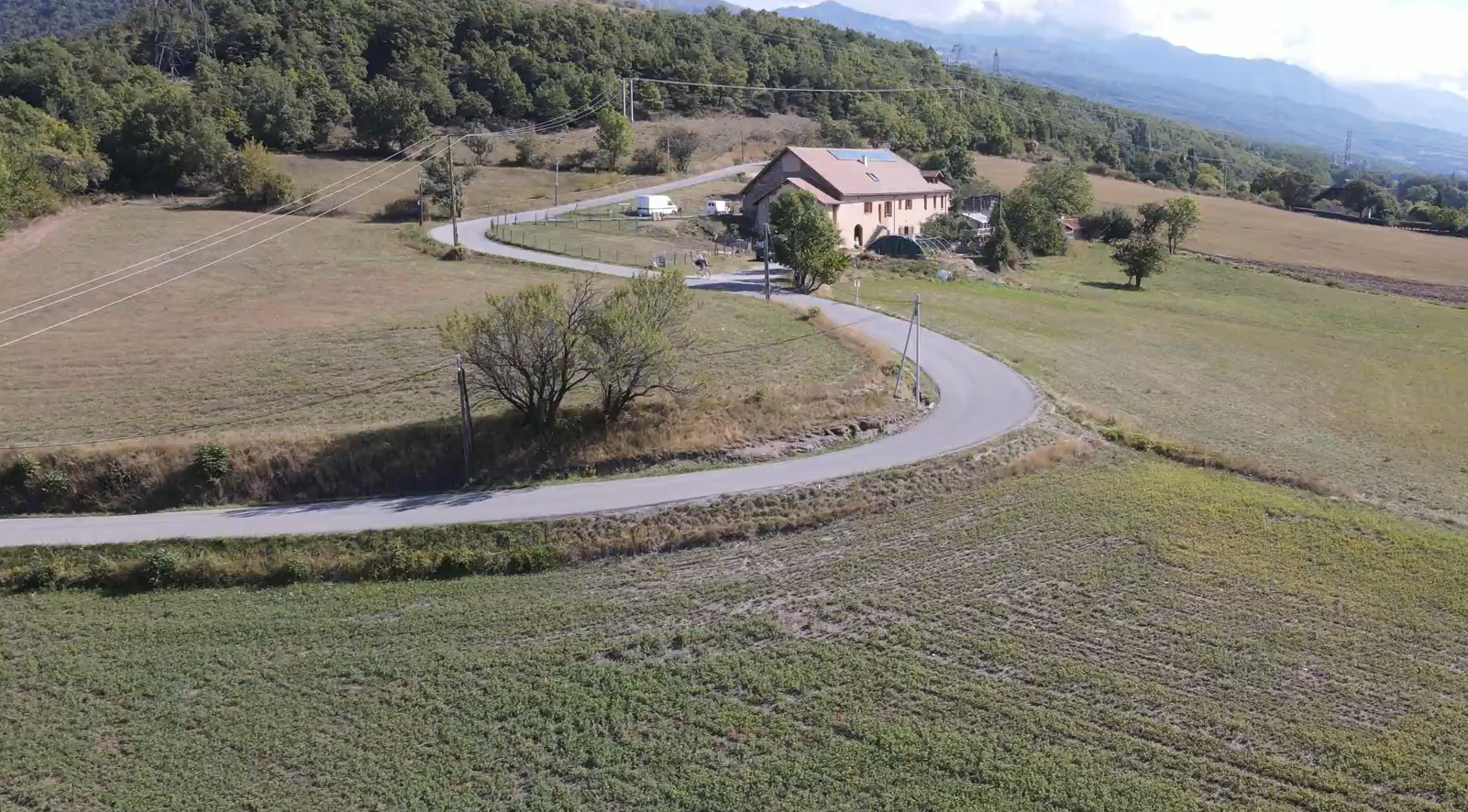
The road segment where the crash happened

Although the biggest climbs in this stage were at the beginning, it was the much smaller ones at the end that proved decisive. Several attacks in the early race brought groups ahead, possibly the most important rider in these was Jörg Jaksche. Being a teammate of GC number 2 Joseba Beloki, and himself not very far behind Armstrong, his intention was probably to force Armstrong's team to work, which makes them less capable of defending him against Beloki later in the stage or in the coming stages. At the end of the final (fourth category) climb of Cote de La Rochette, Vinokourov was in position to win a second stage, after having received the order to attack previously in order to compensate for the time his teammate Santiago Botero was going to lose due to stomach problems.

During the descent, however, shortly after passing the Col de Manse, Beloki locked his wheel on the melting road surface, flying out of control, and falling on his head, shoulder, and hip. He badly injured his elbow, and despite trying to get back on his bike, was taken to the hospital, dropping out of the Tour with several broken bones. His injuries proved severe enough that he was also forced to miss the 2004 Tour de France. Lance Armstrong, sitting just behind Beloki, managed some quick thinking, swerving off the road through a field, getting off his bike, hopping over a small embankment, and resuming the chase. He may have been assisted in his cross-country journey through the practice he gained racing cyclo-cross events in the off-season. Despite a hard chase, Vinokourov kept the lead and took the stage, as well as second place in the general classification.

Stage 9 result

Rank	Rider	Team	Time
1	Alexander Vinokourov (KAZ)	Team Telekom	5h 02' 00"
2	Paolo Bettini (ITA)	Quick-Step–Davitamon	+ 36"
3	Iban Mayo (ESP)	Euskaltel–Euskadi	s.t.
~~4~~	~~Lance Armstrong (USA)~~	~~U.S. Postal Service~~	~~s.t.~~
5	Jan Ullrich (GER)	Team Bianchi	s.t.
6	Ivan Basso (ITA)	Fassa Bortolo	s.t.
7	Georg Totschnig (AUT)	Gerolsteiner	s.t.
8	Francisco Mancebo (ESP)	iBanesto.com	s.t.
9	Haimar Zubeldia (ESP)	Euskaltel–Euskadi	s.t.
10	Tyler Hamilton (USA)	Team CSC	s.t.

Points classification after Stage 9

Rank	Rider	Team	Points
1	Baden Cooke (AUS)	FDJeux.com	120
2	Robbie McEwen (AUS)	Lotto–Domo	110
3	Thor Hushovd (NOR)	Crédit Agricole	104

General classification after stage 9

Rank	Rider	Team	Time
~~1~~	~~Lance Armstrong (USA)~~	~~U.S. Postal Service~~	~~40h 15' 26"~~
2	Alexander Vinokourov (KAZ)	Team Telekom	+ 21"
3	Iban Mayo (ESP)	Euskaltel–Euskadi	+ 1' 02"
4	Francisco Mancebo (ESP)	iBanesto.com	+ 1' 37"
5	Tyler Hamilton (USA)	Team CSC	+ 1' 52"
6	Jan Ullrich (GER)	Team Bianchi	+ 2' 10"
7	Ivan Basso (ITA)	Fassa Bortolo	+ 2' 25"
8	Roberto Heras (ESP)	U.S. Postal Service	+ 2' 28"
9	Haimar Zubeldia (ESP)	Euskaltel–Euskadi	+ 3' 25"
10	Denis Menchov (RUS)	iBanesto.com	+ 3' 45"

Mountains classification after Stage 9

Rank	Rider	Team	Points
1	Richard Virenque (FRA)	Quick-Step–Davitamon	135
2	Jörg Jaksche (GER)	ONCE–Eroski	75
~~3~~	~~Lance Armstrong (USA)~~	~~U.S. Postal Service~~	~~74~~
