= Zubeldia =

Zubeldia (or Zubeldía) is a surname. Notable people with the surname include:

- Haimar Zubeldia (born 1977), Spanish retired road racing cyclist
- Igor Zubeldia (born 1997), Spanish footballer
- Joseba Zubeldia (born 1979), Spanish retired road racing cyclist
- Juan Zubeldía (born 1979), Argentine football manager and former player
- Luis Zubeldía (born 1981), Argentine football manager and former player
- Osvaldo Zubeldía (1927–1982), Argentine footballer and coach
- Emiliana de Zubeldia (1888–1987), Spanish pianist and composer
