= 2003 Tour de France, Stage 10 to Stage 20 =

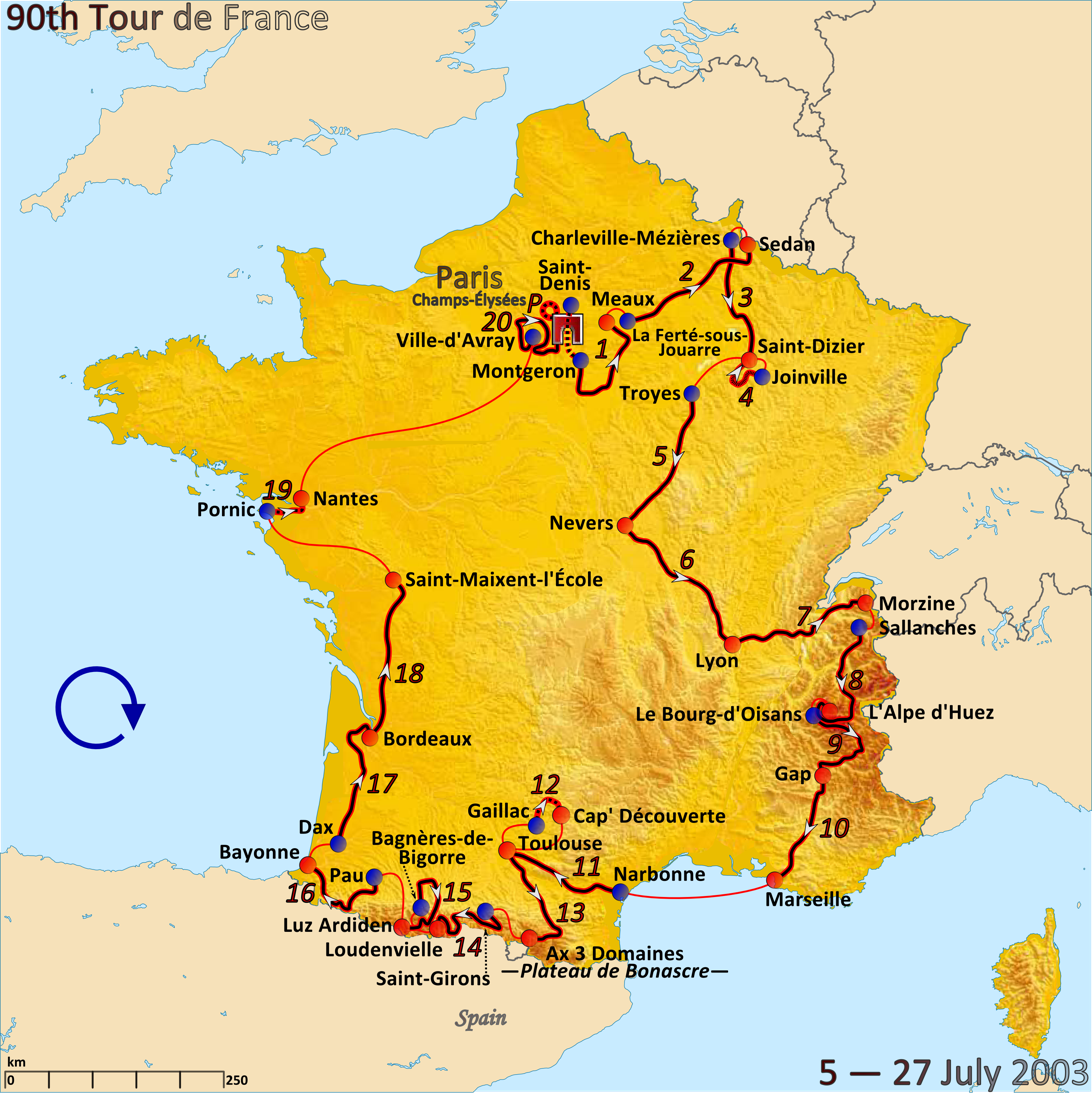
Route of the 2003 Tour de France

The 2003 Tour de France was the 90th edition of Tour de France, one of cycling's Grand Tours. The Tour began in Paris with a prologue individual time trial on 5 July. The Stage 10 occurred on 15 July with a flat stage from Gap. The race finished on the Champs-Élysées, back in Paris, on 27 July.

== Stage 10 ==
15 July 2003 — Gap to Marseille, 219.5 km (136.4 mi)

A long, largely flat 219.5 km stage after three days in the mountains gave the majority of the riders a chance to recuperate, the pace was somewhat slower than the average to this stage. The roadside temperature was high (around 40 °C).

A group of nine riders made a break after just 16 km and slowly built their lead up, to 17 minutes by halfway and to a maximum of around 23 minutes. With such a substantial lead the nine rider group began to fragment with repeated attacks from around 50 km to go, José Enrique Gutiérrez made a solo break and led into Marseille, he was closed down and passed by Fabio Sacchi and then Jakob Piil. These two riders worked together and soon built up a minute lead over the others. Entering the final 2 km to the finish Piil and Sacchi shook hands and began to race, Piil led out but managed to hold off Sacchi to become the first Danish stage winner since Bjarne Riis in 1996. Bram de Groot broke from the chasers to finish third and the peloton came in over 21 minutes down. The top positions in the general classification were unchanged, the best placed rider in the breakaway was over ¾ of an hour down on Armstrong.

Stage 10 result

Rank	Rider	Team	Time
1	Jakob Piil (DEN)	Team CSC	5h 09' 33"
2	Fabio Sacchi (ITA)	Saeco	s.t.
3	Bram de Groot (NED)	Rabobank	+ 49"
4	Damien Nazon (FRA)	Brioches La Boulangère	+ 2' 07"
5	René Haselbacher (AUT)	Gerolsteiner	s.t.
6	Philippe Gaumont (FRA)	Cofidis	s.t.
7	Serge Baguet (BEL)	Lotto–Domo	s.t.
8	José Vicente García Acosta (ESP)	iBanesto.com	s.t.
9	José Enrique Gutiérrez (ESP)	Kelme–Costa Blanca	+ 5' 06"
10	Baden Cooke (AUS)	FDJeux.com	+ 21' 23"

Points classification after Stage 10

Rank	Rider	Team	Points
1	Baden Cooke (AUS)	FDJeux.com	140
2	Robbie McEwen (AUS)	Lotto–Domo	131
3	Erik Zabel (GER)	Team Telekom	112

General classification after stage 10

Rank	Rider	Team	Time
~~1~~	~~Lance Armstrong (USA)~~	~~U.S. Postal Service~~	~~45h 46' 22"~~
2	Alexander Vinokourov (KAZ)	Team Telekom	+ 21"
3	Iban Mayo (ESP)	Euskaltel–Euskadi	+ 1' 02"
4	Francisco Mancebo (ESP)	iBanesto.com	+ 1' 37"
5	Tyler Hamilton (USA)	Team CSC	+ 1' 52"
6	Jan Ullrich (GER)	Team Bianchi	+ 2' 10"
7	Ivan Basso (ITA)	Fassa Bortolo	+ 2' 25"
8	Roberto Heras (ESP)	U.S. Postal Service	+ 2' 28"
9	Haimar Zubeldia (ESP)	Euskaltel–Euskadi	+ 3' 25"
10	Denis Menchov (RUS)	iBanesto.com	+ 3' 45"

Mountains classification after Stage 10

Rank	Rider	Team	Points
1	Richard Virenque (FRA)	Quick-Step–Davitamon	135
2	Jörg Jaksche (GER)	ONCE–Eroski	75
~~3~~	~~Lance Armstrong (USA)~~	~~U.S. Postal Service~~	~~74~~

== Stage 11 ==
17 July 2003 — Narbonne to Toulouse, 153.5 km (95.4 mi)

After the first rest day, one of the shortest stages of the tour at 153.5 km, another flat stage with only one climb, the third category Cote de Saissac at 82 km. The Tour has finished a stage in Toulouse 24 times before, the last time in 1985.

There were a number of early breakaways and one early crash but the US Postal team worked hard to keep the field together. It was not until early afternoon, just before Carcassonne, that a group of eight riders made it clear. They built up their lead to a maximum of around four minutes. With the peloton closing and 10 km to go Juan Antonio Flecha of Banesto attacked from the breakaway and built up a small lead of 20 seconds. Despite the field closing in he held on to win the stage by 4 seconds, the peloton coming in less than a minute behind. Former Tour star Jens Voigt, struggling with illness, abandoned the race.

Stage 11 result

Rank	Rider	Team	Time
1	Juan Antonio Flecha (ESP)	iBanesto.com	3h 29' 33"
2	Bram de Groot (NED)	Rabobank	+ 4"
3	Isidro Nozal (ESP)	ONCE–Eroski	s.t.
4	Íñigo Cuesta (ESP)	Cofidis	+ 15"
5	Carlos Da Cruz (FRA)	FDJeux.com	+ 23"
6	Stuart O'Grady (AUS)	Crédit Agricole	s.t.
7	Nicolas Portal (FRA)	AG2R Prévoyance	s.t.
8	Michael Rogers (AUS)	Quick-Step–Davitamon	s.t.
9	Robbie McEwen (AUS)	Lotto–Domo	+ 42"
10	Baden Cooke (AUS)	FDJeux.com	s.t.

Points classification after Stage 11

Rank	Rider	Team	Points
1	Baden Cooke (AUS)	FDJeux.com	156
2	Robbie McEwen (AUS)	Lotto–Domo	148
3	Erik Zabel (GER)	Team Telekom	126

General classification after stage 11

Rank	Rider	Team	Time
~~1~~	~~Lance Armstrong (USA)~~	~~U.S. Postal Service~~	~~49h 16' 37"~~
2	Alexander Vinokourov (KAZ)	Team Telekom	+ 21"
3	Iban Mayo (ESP)	Euskaltel–Euskadi	+ 1' 02"
4	Francisco Mancebo (ESP)	iBanesto.com	+ 1' 37"
5	Tyler Hamilton (USA)	Team CSC	+ 1' 52"
6	Jan Ullrich (GER)	Team Bianchi	+ 2' 10"
7	Ivan Basso (ITA)	Fassa Bortolo	+ 2' 25"
8	Roberto Heras (ESP)	U.S. Postal Service	+ 2' 28"
9	Haimar Zubeldia (ESP)	Euskaltel–Euskadi	+ 3' 25"
10	Denis Menchov (RUS)	iBanesto.com	+ 3' 45"

Mountains classification after Stage 11

Rank	Rider	Team	Points
1	Richard Virenque (FRA)	Quick-Step–Davitamon	135
2	Jörg Jaksche (GER)	ONCE–Eroski	75
~~3~~	~~Lance Armstrong (USA)~~	~~U.S. Postal Service~~	~~74~~

== Stage 12 ==
18 July 2003 — Gaillac to Cap Découverte, 47 km (29.2 mi) (ITT)

The first time trial (not counting the prologue) was late this year, usually it is contested before the first mountain stage. Most expected Armstrong to take it, although in previous days he had shown to be not as strongly reigning as in previous years, but in the end he lost one and a half minutes to Jan Ullrich although winning over the rest of the field. Alexander Vinokourov took third place and remained with Armstrong and Ullrich in the contest for the final win, putting the other favourites at a little distance. Tyler Hamilton is now in fourth place, hanging on despite a broken collarbone from the fall in stage 2.

Stage 12 result

Rank	Rider	Team	Time
1	Jan Ullrich (GER)	Team Bianchi	58' 32"
~~2~~	~~Lance Armstrong (USA)~~	~~U.S. Postal Service~~	~~+ 1' 36"~~
3	Alexander Vinokourov (KAZ)	Team Telekom	+ 2' 06"
4	Haimar Zubeldia (ESP)	Euskaltel–Euskadi	+ 2' 40"
5	Tyler Hamilton (USA)	Team CSC	+ 2' 43"
6	Uwe Peschel (GER)	Gerolsteiner	+ 3' 26"
7	David Millar (GBR)	Cofidis	+ 3' 55"
8	Íñigo Chaurreau (ESP)	AG2R Prévoyance	+ 4' 01"
9	David Plaza (ESP)	Team Bianchi	+ 4' 37"
10	Santiago Botero (COL)	Team Telekom	+ 5' 00"

Points classification after Stage 12

Rank	Rider	Team	Points
1	Baden Cooke (AUS)	FDJeux.com	156
2	Robbie McEwen (AUS)	Lotto–Domo	148
3	Erik Zabel (GER)	Team Telekom	126

General classification after stage 12

Rank	Rider	Team	Time
~~1~~	~~Lance Armstrong (USA)~~	~~U.S. Postal Service~~	~~50h 16' 45"~~
2	Jan Ullrich (GER)	Team Bianchi	+ 34"
3	Alexander Vinokourov (KAZ)	Team Telekom	+ 51"
4	Tyler Hamilton (USA)	Team CSC	+ 2' 59"
5	Haimar Zubeldia (ESP)	Euskaltel–Euskadi	+ 4' 29"
6	Iban Mayo (ESP)	Euskaltel–Euskadi	s.t.
7	Francisco Mancebo (ESP)	iBanesto.com	+ 5' 01"
8	Ivan Basso (ITA)	Fassa Bortolo	+ 6' 49"
9	Denis Menchov (RUS)	iBanesto.com	+ 7' 24"
10	Christophe Moreau (FRA)	Crédit Agricole	+ 7' 55"

Mountains classification after Stage 12

Rank	Rider	Team	Points
1	Richard Virenque (FRA)	Quick-Step–Davitamon	135
2	Jörg Jaksche (GER)	ONCE–Eroski	75
~~3~~	~~Lance Armstrong (USA)~~	~~U.S. Postal Service~~	~~74~~

== Stage 13 ==
19 July 2003 — Toulouse to Plateau de Bonascre (Ax 3 Domaines), 197.5 km (122.7 mi)

The 197.5 km route marked the beginning of four days in the mountains, a flattish first 120 km with two sprints ended in two category one climbs, the Port de Pailhères at 168.5 km and the finish on the Plateau de Bonascre. Again the weather was very hot.

There were a number of early attacks, the peloton chased each escapee down only for another group to try to break. Eventually around midday a group of ten made it clear and after some effort the peloton did not chase them over and the group built up a maximum lead of almost nine minutes. As the first climb was reached the ten-man group had a lead of around six minutes, on the Port de Pailhères the leaders faltered and the group broke up. The group containing the race leaders closed in during the climb and at the summit the leading three (Sastre, Rubiera and Mercado) had two minutes over their chasers. On the start of the 9 km climb to the finish the leaders had retained their two-minute advantage. Over the climb the three leaders were gradually caught but Sastre and Mercado held out, with 3 km to go the peloton started to break, attacks from Zubeldia and Vinokourov put the riders under pressure and while Ullrich caught up Armstrong was dropped. Sastre won and Ullrich came second, Armstrong recovered to reduce his loss to 7 seconds. With the time bonus for Ullrich coming second Armstrong's overall lead was reduced to 15 seconds. However, according to specialists, this was the day that Ullrich should have won the Tour. Still suffering the consequences of the dehydration he had suffered during the previous Time Trial, Armstrong fell back badly at the beginning of the last climb, the Plateau de Bonascre, but Ullrich failed to capitalise on Armstrong's weakness and he didn't attack, winning only seven seconds (plus the time bonus) over the Texan rider. There is speculation about if it was an error of Ullrich's or whether he had not the physical capacity to attack.

Stage 13 result

Rank	Rider	Team	Time
1	Carlos Sastre (ESP)	Team CSC	5h 16' 08"
2	Jan Ullrich (GER)	Team Bianchi	+ 1' 01"
3	Haimar Zubeldia (ESP)	Euskaltel–Euskadi	s.t.
~~4~~	~~Lance Armstrong (USA)~~	~~U.S. Postal Service~~	~~+ 1' 08"~~
5	Alexander Vinokourov (KAZ)	Team Telekom	+ 1' 18"
6	Ivan Basso (ITA)	Fassa Bortolo	s.t.
7	Juan Miguel Mercado (ESP)	iBanesto.com	+ 1' 24"
8	Iban Mayo (ESP)	Euskaltel–Euskadi	+ 1' 59"
9	Christophe Moreau (FRA)	Crédit Agricole	+ 2' 32"
10	Tyler Hamilton (USA)	Team CSC	s.t.

Points classification after Stage 13

Rank	Rider	Team	Points
1	Baden Cooke (AUS)	FDJeux.com	156
2	Robbie McEwen (AUS)	Lotto–Domo	148
3	Erik Zabel (GER)	Team Telekom	132

General classification after stage 13

Rank	Rider	Team	Time
~~1~~	~~Lance Armstrong (USA)~~	~~U.S. Postal Service~~	~~55h 34' 01"~~
2	Jan Ullrich (GER)	Team Bianchi	+ 15"
3	Alexander Vinokourov (KAZ)	Team Telekom	+ 1' 01"
4	Haimar Zubeldia (ESP)	Euskaltel–Euskadi	+ 4' 16"
5	Tyler Hamilton (USA)	Team CSC	+ 4' 25"
6	Iban Mayo (ESP)	Euskaltel–Euskadi	+ 5' 20"
7	Ivan Basso (ITA)	Fassa Bortolo	+ 7' 01"
8	Francisco Mancebo (ESP)	iBanesto.com	+ 7' 02"
9	Carlos Sastre (ESP)	Team CSC	+ 8' 47"
10	Christophe Moreau (FRA)	Crédit Agricole	+ 9' 19"

Mountains classification after Stage 13

Rank	Rider	Team	Points
1	Richard Virenque (FRA)	Quick-Step–Davitamon	149
~~2~~	~~Lance Armstrong (USA)~~	~~U.S. Postal Service~~	~~92~~
3	Juan Miguel Mercado (ESP)	iBanesto.com	77

== Stage 14 ==
20 July 2003 — Saint-Girons to Loudenvielle-le-Louron, 191.5 km (119.0 mi)

The second day in the Pyrenees, the 191.5 km stage had two category two climbs and four category one climbs spaced throughout the route. The toughest climbs were the Col de la Core at 67 km, Col de Menté at 118.5 km, the Col du Portillon at 156 km and the final climb and descent of the Col de Peyresourde at 180 km. The route included the second category Col de Portet d'Aspet, where Fabio Casartelli was mortally injured in 1995.

Just 162 riders started the stage. There was a very early break of seventeen riders, including Richard Virenque, Gilberto Simoni, Jakob Piil and Manuel Beltrán. The group steadily increased their lead over the US Postal led peloton in the early part of the race. By the first category two climb they were over nine minutes clear, by the Col de la Core over twelve minutes. When the deficit hit almost fifteen minutes the teams of USP and Euskaltel joined at the front of the peloton, later they were joined by Telekom and then Bianchi. By the Col du Portet d'Aspet the lead was reduced to around eleven minutes and on the Col de Menté the leading 17 were showing signs of fatigue and began to drop riders, a group of twelve being led by Virenque over the summit.

The tour then entered Spain for a few kilometres before the climb of the Col du Portillon, where the leading group broke up with a trio of Dufaux, Simoni and Virenque leading the peloton by seven minutes over the summit. The trio remained ahead up the Col de Peyresourde as the field behind them split under repeated attacks, while Armstrong stuck close to Ullrich Vinokourov broke away. Dufaux, Simoni and Virenque kept their lead; they were joined by Peron and fought out the finish, Simoni winning the sprint. Vinokourov led in two others was 41 seconds down and Armstrong and Ullrich came in 1' 24" later.

Stage 14 result

Rank	Rider	Team	Time
1	Gilberto Simoni (ITA)	Saeco	5h 31' 52"
2	Laurent Dufaux (SUI)	Alessio	s.t.
3	Richard Virenque (FRA)	Quick-Step–Davitamon	s.t.
4	Andrea Peron (ITA)	Team CSC	+ 3"
5	Walter Bénéteau (FRA)	Brioches La Boulangère	+ 10"
6	Alexander Vinokourov (KAZ)	Team Telekom	+ 41"
7	Iban Mayo (ESP)	Euskaltel–Euskadi	s.t.
8	Steve Zampieri (SUI)	Vini Caldirola–So.Di	s.t.
9	Haimar Zubeldia (ESP)	Euskaltel–Euskadi	+ 1' 24"
10	Ivan Basso (ITA)	Fassa Bortolo	s.t.

Points classification after Stage 14

Rank	Rider	Team	Points
1	Baden Cooke (AUS)	FDJeux.com	156
2	Robbie McEwen (AUS)	Lotto–Domo	148
3	Erik Zabel (GER)	Team Telekom	132

General classification after stage 14

Rank	Rider	Team	Time
~~1~~	~~Lance Armstrong (USA)~~	~~U.S. Postal Service~~	~~61h 07' 17"~~
2	Jan Ullrich (GER)	Team Bianchi	+ 15"
3	Alexander Vinokourov (KAZ)	Team Telekom	+ 18"
4	Haimar Zubeldia (ESP)	Euskaltel–Euskadi	+ 4' 16"
5	Iban Mayo (ESP)	Euskaltel–Euskadi	+ 4' 37"
6	Ivan Basso (ITA)	Fassa Bortolo	+ 7' 01"
7	Tyler Hamilton (USA)	Team CSC	+ 7' 32"
8	Francisco Mancebo (ESP)	iBanesto.com	+ 10' 09"
9	Christophe Moreau (FRA)	Crédit Agricole	s.t.
10	Carlos Sastre (ESP)	Team CSC	+ 12' 40"

Mountains classification after Stage 14

Rank	Rider	Team	Points
1	Richard Virenque (FRA)	Quick-Step–Davitamon	300
2	Laurent Dufaux (SUI)	Alessio	163
3	Paolo Bettini (ITA)	Quick-Step–Davitamon	98

== Stage 15 ==
21 July 2003 — Bagnères-de-Bigorre to Luz Ardiden, 159.5 km (99.1 mi)

Another day in the Hautes-Pyrénées. The 159.5 km stage had three big climbs, the category one Col d'Aspin at 94 km, the famous hors catégorie Col du Tourmalet at 124 km and finally a hors catégorie finish at Luz Ardiden. These were the last hors catégorie climbs on the 2003 Tour.

The stage had another fast start but the real excitement was reserved for the final 13 km up to Luz Ardiden in what was to turn out to be one of the most epic Tour de France stages in the Armstrong 'era'. In the earlier part of the race Botero and Chavanel escaped and built up a lead of around ten minutes by the Col d'Aspin. On the ascent of the Col du Tourmalet Ullrich made a number of efforts to drop Armstrong, but with no success. By the summit the main riders were still together and the now lone escapee, Chavanel, was four minutes clear. The chasing group of Ullrich and Armstrong was seven strong and had all the main contenders except Vinokourov, who was having a tough time and only briefly joined them at the start of the final climb.

At the start of the final ascent Chavanel was five minutes up on his chasers. The chasing group remained together until about 10 km to go, Mayo attacked and was matched by Armstrong but as Armstrong set himself up for a further push he tangled with the musette bag of a young spectator and crashed, bringing down Mayo and almost Ullrich too. The main group, including Ullrich and marshalled by his friend and former colleague Tyler Hamilton, slowed for Armstrong to catch up. Armstrong did catch up despite almost coming off again when the gear on his damaged bike slipped, almost as soon as Mayo and Armstrong reached the main group they attacked again in a repeat of the situation before the crash. This time a determined Armstrong dropped Mayo and Ullrich and powered off like a man possessed after the lone Chavanel. He caught Chavanel with about 4 km to the finish, sportingly tapping him on the back to acknowledge his efforts, as he passed him to win the stage, his sixteenth stage victory and probably his last chance to gain some time over Ullrich before the final time trial. Ullrich had fallen over a minute behind but, typically, by the finish had fought back and reduced his loss to 40 seconds, not including time bonuses some of which were denied him by Mayo who took 2nd place. Richard Virenque had, barring accidents, won the polka-dot jersey.

Stage 15 result

Rank	Rider	Team	Time
~~1~~	~~Lance Armstrong (USA)~~	~~U.S. Postal Service~~	~~4h 29' 26"~~
2	Iban Mayo (ESP)	Euskaltel–Euskadi	+ 40"
3	Jan Ullrich (GER)	Team Bianchi	s.t.
4	Haimar Zubeldia (ESP)	Euskaltel–Euskadi	s.t.
5	Christophe Moreau (FRA)	Crédit Agricole	+ 43"
6	Ivan Basso (ITA)	Fassa Bortolo	+ 47"
7	Tyler Hamilton (USA)	Team CSC	+ 1' 10"
8	Alexander Vinokourov (KAZ)	Team Telekom	+ 2' 07"
9	José Luis Rubiera (ESP)	U.S. Postal Service	+ 2' 45"
10	Sylvain Chavanel (FRA)	Brioches La Boulangère	+ 2' 47"

Points classification after Stage 15

Rank	Rider	Team	Points
1	Baden Cooke (AUS)	FDJeux.com	156
2	Robbie McEwen (AUS)	Lotto–Domo	148
3	Erik Zabel (GER)	Team Telekom	132

General classification after stage 15

Rank	Rider	Team	Time
~~1~~	~~Lance Armstrong (USA)~~	~~U.S. Postal Service~~	~~65h 36' 23"~~
2	Jan Ullrich (GER)	Team Bianchi	+ 1' 07"
3	Alexander Vinokourov (KAZ)	Team Telekom	+ 2' 45"
4	Haimar Zubeldia (ESP)	Euskaltel–Euskadi	+ 5' 16"
5	Iban Mayo (ESP)	Euskaltel–Euskadi	+ 5' 25"
6	Ivan Basso (ITA)	Fassa Bortolo	+ 8' 08"
7	Tyler Hamilton (USA)	Team CSC	+ 9' 02"
8	Christophe Moreau (FRA)	Crédit Agricole	+ 11' 12"
9	Francisco Mancebo (ESP)	iBanesto.com	+ 16' 05"
10	Carlos Sastre (ESP)	Team CSC	+ 16' 12"

Mountains classification after Stage 15

Rank	Rider	Team	Points
1	Richard Virenque (FRA)	Quick-Step–Davitamon	318
2	Laurent Dufaux (SUI)	Alessio	177
~~3~~	~~Lance Armstrong (USA)~~	~~U.S. Postal Service~~	~~167~~

== Stage 16 ==
23 July 2003 — Pau to Bayonne, 197.5 km (122.7 mi)

A 197.5 km stage in the Pyrénées-Atlantiques, there were six climbs, two major – the Col du Soudet at 67.5 km and the Col Bagarguy at 110 km. The descent of the Col Bagarguy is interrupted by the minor Cote de Burdincurutcheta, a Basque name.

As often this year the stage started fast and was marked by early breakaway attempts. The early attempts were chased down, the high pace (48 km in the first hour) briefly dropped Tyler Hamilton but his CSC team-mates brought him back to the peloton. Around midday a group of fifteen riders made it clear before the Col du Soudet. The leading group broke up during the ascent. Hamilton attacked from the peloton at 55 km and jumped across to the leaders, around three minutes up on the peloton, before the summit. The leaders stayed together over the next small climb and maintained their lead, they dropped a number of riders including David Millar who quickly fell back to and through the peloton. On the ascent of the Col Bagarguy Hamilton attacked the leading group and raced ahead alone. He had a two-minute lead at the summit and almost four minutes over the peloton. In the fog over the Cote de Burdincurutcheta he extended his lead. The chasers were gradually caught by the peloton on the long flattish run to the finish but Hamilton pushed his lead out to five minutes. His lead started to fall with 25 km to go, but despite Fassa Bortolo, Euskaltel and Telekom leading the chase Hamilton stayed clear to win his first Tour stage ever.

Stage 16 result

Rank	Rider	Team	Time
1	Tyler Hamilton (USA)	Team CSC	4h 59' 41"
2	Erik Zabel (GER)	Team Telekom	+ 1' 55"
3	Yuriy Krivtsov (UKR)	Jean Delatour	s.t.
4	Luca Paolini (ITA)	Quick-Step–Davitamon	s.t.
5	Gerrit Glomser (AUT)	Saeco	s.t.
6	Bram de Groot (NED)	Rabobank	s.t.
7	Markus Zberg (SUI)	Gerolsteiner	s.t.
8	Sandy Casar (FRA)	FDJeux.com	s.t.
9	Fabrizio Guidi (ITA)	Team Bianchi	s.t.
10	Stuart O'Grady (AUS)	Crédit Agricole	s.t.

Points classification after Stage 16

Rank	Rider	Team	Points
1	Baden Cooke (AUS)	FDJeux.com	156
2	Robbie McEwen (AUS)	Lotto–Domo	148
3	Erik Zabel (GER)	Team Telekom	143

General classification after stage 16

Rank	Rider	Team	Time
~~1~~	~~Lance Armstrong (USA)~~	~~U.S. Postal Service~~	~~70h 37' 59"~~
2	Jan Ullrich (GER)	Team Bianchi	+ 1' 07"
3	Alexander Vinokourov (KAZ)	Team Telekom	+ 2' 45"
4	Haimar Zubeldia (ESP)	Euskaltel–Euskadi	+ 5' 16"
5	Iban Mayo (ESP)	Euskaltel–Euskadi	+ 5' 25"
6	Tyler Hamilton (USA)	Team CSC	+ 6' 35"
7	Ivan Basso (ITA)	Fassa Bortolo	+ 8' 08"
8	Christophe Moreau (FRA)	Crédit Agricole	+ 11' 12"
9	Francisco Mancebo (ESP)	iBanesto.com	+ 16' 05"
10	Carlos Sastre (ESP)	Team CSC	+ 16' 12"

Mountains classification after Stage 16

Rank	Rider	Team	Points
1	Richard Virenque (FRA)	Quick-Step–Davitamon	324
2	Laurent Dufaux (SUI)	Alessio	187
~~3~~	~~Lance Armstrong (USA)~~	~~U.S. Postal Service~~	~~168~~

== Stage 17 ==
24 July 2003 — Dax to Bordeaux, 181 km (112.5 mi)

After the Pyrenees this 181 km was short and almost absolutely flat, the highest climb was 79 m. Traditionally the stages into Bordeaux have been won by one of the sprinters.

The race started with an attack by ten riders within the first minutes. The peloton reacted at first but after holding the gap at around sixty seconds for about 25 km the chase slowed and by 40 km the lead was up to six minutes and at around 70 km the breakaway's lead peaked at just over sixteen minutes. The peloton cut into the escapees lead but too slowly to catch them and with about 40 km to go and an eight-minute gap the peloton again slowed. With 18 km to the finish Servais Knaven attacked from the leading group and held off their disorganised chase to win. Robbie McEwen headed peloton in eight minutes later. The competition for the Green jersey remained very close.

Stage 17 result

Rank	Rider	Team	Time
1	Servais Knaven (NED)	Quick-Step–Davitamon	3h 54' 23"
2	Paolo Bossoni (ITA)	Vini Caldirola–So.Di	+ 17"
3	Christophe Mengin (FRA)	FDJeux.com	s.t.
4	Léon van Bon (NED)	Lotto–Domo	s.t.
5	Salvatore Commesso (ITA)	Saeco	s.t.
6	José Vicente García (ESP)	iBanesto.com	s.t.
7	Peter Luttenberger (AUT)	Team CSC	s.t.
8	Médéric Clain (FRA)	Cofidis	s.t.
9	Bram de Groot (NED)	Rabobank	s.t.
10	Iván Parra (COL)	Kelme–Costa Blanca	+ 1' 55"

Points classification after Stage 17

Rank	Rider	Team	Points
1	Baden Cooke (AUS)	FDJeux.com	169
2	Robbie McEwen (AUS)	Lotto–Domo	163
3	Erik Zabel (GER)	Team Telekom	157

General classification after stage 17

Rank	Rider	Team	Time
~~1~~	~~Lance Armstrong (USA)~~	~~U.S. Postal Service~~	~~74h 40' 28"~~
2	Jan Ullrich (GER)	Team Bianchi	+ 1' 07"
3	Alexander Vinokourov (KAZ)	Team Telekom	+ 2' 45"
4	Haimar Zubeldia (ESP)	Euskaltel–Euskadi	+ 5' 16"
5	Iban Mayo (ESP)	Euskaltel–Euskadi	+ 5' 25"
6	Tyler Hamilton (USA)	Team CSC	+ 6' 35"
7	Ivan Basso (ITA)	Fassa Bortolo	+ 8' 08"
8	Christophe Moreau (FRA)	Crédit Agricole	+ 11' 12"
9	Francisco Mancebo (ESP)	iBanesto.com	16' 05"
10	Carlos Sastre (ESP)	Team CSC	+ 16' 12"

Mountains classification after Stage 17

Rank	Rider	Team	Points
1	Richard Virenque (FRA)	Quick-Step–Davitamon	324
2	Laurent Dufaux (SUI)	Alessio	187
~~3~~	~~Lance Armstrong (USA)~~	~~U.S. Postal Service~~	~~168~~

== Stage 18 ==
25 July 2003 — Bordeaux to Saint-Maixent-l'École, 202.5 km (125.8 mi)

A flat 203.5 km with no climbs, two sprints and a moderate tailwind crossing four departments. With the time trial looming another breakaway success looked possible.

With the favourable conditions and the 25 km/h wind the stage started very fast. There were a few small attacks early on; a group of around thirty made a break at 26 km to be swept up at 40 km. The peloton was still together at the first intermediate sprint in Montendre, unusually Jan Ullrich made a race of it, he was chased by Armstrong and they came second and third behind Robbie McEwen, getting small time bonuses that cut Ullrich's deficit by two seconds. Shortly after the sprint, at 61 km, a group of sixteen made a break and unlike early attempts they stayed clear. Working together the escapees quickly built up their lead to over 11 minutes by the 100 km point, the first two hours of racing passed with an average speed of 52 km/h. The lead continued to grow reaching a maximum of just over 22 minutes with around 25 km to the finish. The leading group then started to break-up as there were repeated solo attacks, the group split with eight riders moving clear. With 10 km to go attacks started from within the smaller group, David Canada making it clear with a trio of riders chasing after him. In the final kilometre Canada's lead vanished – he was passed by the chasing trio who contested a very close sprint, Pablo Lastras just winning. The peloton came in 24:05 later. The green jersey competition was still very close, it could still change hands on the final Stage in Paris.

Despite the amazing early speed the race slowed in the second portion, becoming just the second fastest road stage in Tour history. At an average speed of 49.938 km/h it was still inferior to the 50.355 km/h of Stage Four in 1999 (Laval to Blois, 194.5 km).

Stage 18 result

Rank	Rider	Team	Time
1	Pablo Lastras (ESP)	iBanesto.com	4h 03' 18"
2	Carlos Da Cruz (FRA)	FDJeux.com	s.t.
3	Daniele Nardello (ITA)	Team Telekom	s.t.
4	David Cañada (ESP)	Quick-Step–Davitamon	+ 4"
5	Massimiliano Lelli (ITA)	Cofidis	+ 19"
6	Andy Flickinger (FRA)	AG2R Prévoyance	s.t.
7	Thomas Voeckler (FRA)	Brioches La Boulangère	s.t.
8	Paolo Fornaciari (ITA)	Saeco	s.t.
9	Fabrizio Guidi (ITA)	Team Bianchi	+ 35"
10	Vladimir Miholjević (CRO)	Alessio	s.t.

Points classification after Stage 18

Rank	Rider	Team	Points
1	Robbie McEwen (AUS)	Lotto–Domo	178
2	Baden Cooke (AUS)	FDJeux.com	176
3	Erik Zabel (GER)	Team Telekom	165

General classification after stage 18

Rank	Rider	Team	Time
~~1~~	~~Lance Armstrong (USA)~~	~~U.S. Postal Service~~	~~79h 07' 49"~~
2	Jan Ullrich (GER)	Team Bianchi	+ 1' 05"
3	Alexander Vinokourov (KAZ)	Team Telekom	+ 2' 47"
4	Haimar Zubeldia (ESP)	Euskaltel–Euskadi	+ 5' 18"
5	Iban Mayo (ESP)	Euskaltel–Euskadi	+ 5' 27"
6	Tyler Hamilton (USA)	Team CSC	+ 6' 37"
7	Ivan Basso (ITA)	Fassa Bortolo	+ 8' 10"
8	Christophe Moreau (FRA)	Crédit Agricole	+ 11' 14"
9	Francisco Mancebo (ESP)	iBanesto.com	16' 07"
10	Carlos Sastre (ESP)	Team CSC	+ 16' 14"

Mountains classification after Stage 18

Rank	Rider	Team	Points
1	Richard Virenque (FRA)	Quick-Step–Davitamon	324
2	Laurent Dufaux (SUI)	Alessio	187
~~3~~	~~Lance Armstrong (USA)~~	~~U.S. Postal Service~~	~~168~~

== Stage 19 ==
26 July 2003 — Pornic to Nantes, 49 km (30.4 mi) (ITT)

The second long individual time trial. 49 km, flatter than the first long time trial and raced in cool rain on slippery roads rather than 30-plus °C.

The final chance for Jan Ullrich to stop Armstrong winning five-in-a-row. The two rode through in almost identical times, but shortly after the second time check at 32.5 km Ullrich fell while taking the curve on a small roundabout. Ullrich's challenge was over. The stage was won by David Millar who, despite illness and the adverse weather, set the second fastest time trial in the Tour, 54.358 km/h (Greg LeMond 54.545 km/h (1989)). A year later David Millar was excluded from the 2004 Tour, and banned from the sport for 2 years, after syringes with traces of EPO were found at his home – he admitted that this time trial was one of the occasions that he had boosted his performance with the drug.

Stage 19 result

Rank	Rider	Team	Time
1	David Millar (GBR)	Cofidis	54' 05"
2	Tyler Hamilton (USA)	Team CSC	+ 9"
~~3~~	~~Lance Armstrong (USA)~~	~~U.S. Postal Service~~	~~+ 14"~~
4	Jan Ullrich (GER)	Team Bianchi	+ 25"
5	László Bodrogi (HUN)	Quick-Step–Davitamon	+ 26"
6	Viatcheslav Ekimov (RUS)	U.S. Postal Service	+ 56"
7	Víctor Hugo Peña (COL)	U.S. Postal Service	+ 1' 00"
8	George Hincapie (USA)	U.S. Postal Service	+ 1' 08"
9	Sylvain Chavanel (FRA)	Brioches La Boulangère	+ 1' 12"
10	Marzio Bruseghin (ITA)	Fassa Bortolo	+ 1' 26"

General classification after stage 19

Rank	Rider	Team	Time
~~1~~	~~Lance Armstrong (USA)~~	~~U.S. Postal Service~~	~~80h 02' 08"~~
2	Jan Ullrich (GER)	Team Bianchi	+ 1' 16"
3	Alexander Vinokourov (KAZ)	Team Telekom	+ 4' 29"
4	Tyler Hamilton (USA)	Team CSC	+ 6' 32"
5	Haimar Zubeldia (ESP)	Euskaltel–Euskadi	+ 7' 06"
6	Iban Mayo (ESP)	Euskaltel–Euskadi	+ 7' 21"
7	Ivan Basso (ITA)	Fassa Bortolo	+ 10' 12"
8	Christophe Moreau (FRA)	Crédit Agricole	+ 12' 43"
9	Carlos Sastre (ESP)	Team CSC	+ 18' 49"
10	Francisco Mancebo (ESP)	iBanesto.com	+ 19' 30"

== Stage 20 ==
27 July 2003 — Ville-d'Avray to Paris, 152 km (94.4 mi)

This was the final stage of the 2003 Tour. Traditionally a relaxed ride into Paris then a hectic ten circuits of the 6.5 km Champs-Élysées loop. Ville d'Avray was the finishing point of the 1903 Tour. With only the sprinter's green jersey still undecided, the two intermediate and the finish were hotly contested.

At the final stage 147 riders started. With the wet roads the stage began slowly; there was a leisurely challenge for the final climbing stage, the category 4 Mont Valerian. As usual the race heated up as the first intermediate sprint at 66 km neared. The sprinter's teams, FDJ and Lotto, led out and Baden Cooke was first followed by Robbie McEwen, leaving the two on equal points. Attacks from other riders then began, small groups making it clear to be quickly caught as the second intermediate sprint at 95 km approached. At that sprint McEwen won and Cooke was second. As the pace slowed after the sprint more riders leapt off the peloton; on the sixth lap a group of eight riders made a break and working hard built up their lead to 45 seconds. Playing tactics, the peloton held back, not beginning the chase until the final three laps. On the last lap the escape was finally caught with about 5 km to go. In an extremely close finish Jean-Patrick Nazon won the stage with Cooke just beating McEwen for second and claiming the green jersey by two points. Armstrong finished prudently far down the field, losing 15 seconds to some of his rivals.

Stage 20 result

Rank	Rider	Team	Time
1	Jean-Patrick Nazon (FRA)	Jean Delatour	3h 38' 49"
2	Baden Cooke (AUS)	FDJeux.com	s.t.
3	Robbie McEwen (AUS)	Lotto–Domo	s.t.
4	Luca Paolini (ITA)	Quick-Step–Davitamon	s.t.
5	Thor Hushovd (NOR)	Crédit Agricole	s.t.
6	Stuart O'Grady (AUS)	Crédit Agricole	s.t.
7	Erik Zabel (GER)	Team Telekom	s.t.
8	Romāns Vainšteins (LAT)	Vini Caldirola–So.Di	s.t.
9	Gerrit Glomser (AUT)	Saeco	s.t.
10	Damien Nazon (FRA)	Brioches La Boulangère	s.t.

General classification after stage 20

Rank	Rider	Team	Time
~~1~~	~~Lance Armstrong (USA)~~	~~U.S. Postal Service~~	~~83h 41' 12"~~
2	Jan Ullrich (GER)	Team Bianchi	+ 1' 01"
3	Alexander Vinokourov (KAZ)	Team Telekom	+ 4' 14"
4	Tyler Hamilton (USA)	Team CSC	+ 6' 17"
5	Haimar Zubeldia (ESP)	Euskaltel–Euskadi	+ 6' 51"
6	Iban Mayo (ESP)	Euskaltel–Euskadi	+ 7' 06"
7	Ivan Basso (ITA)	Fassa Bortolo	+ 10' 12"
8	Christophe Moreau (FRA)	Crédit Agricole	+ 12' 28"
9	Carlos Sastre (ESP)	Team CSC	+ 18' 49"
10	Francisco Mancebo (ESP)	iBanesto.com	+ 19' 15"
