= 2003 Tour de France =

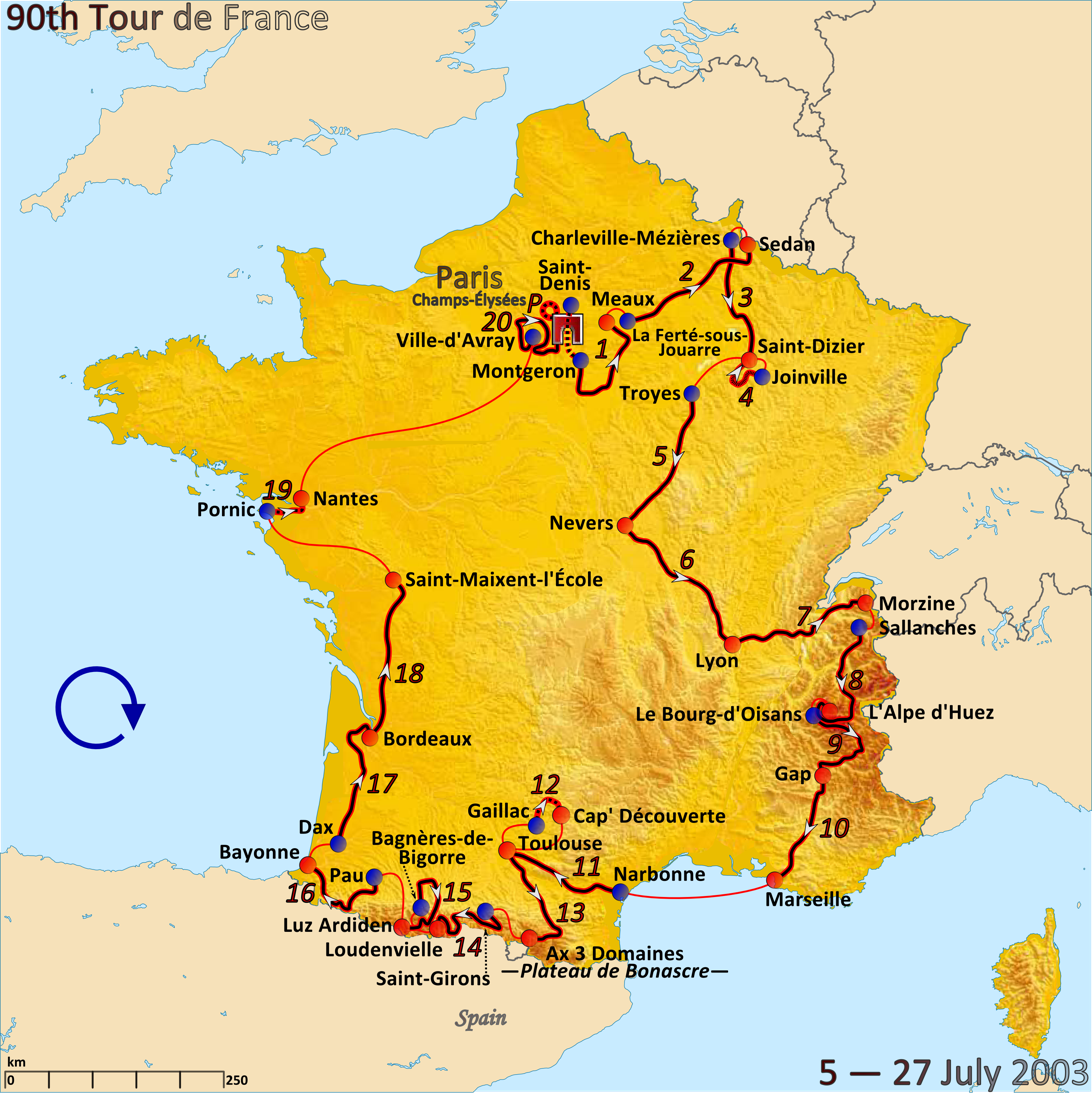
- Route of the 2003 Tour de France

Race details
- Dates: 5–27 July 2003
- Stages: 20 + Prologue
- Distance: 3,427 km (2,129 mi)
- Winning time: 83h 41' 12"

Results
	Winner	~~Lance Armstrong~~ none (Note: On 24 August 2012, the United States Anti-Doping Agency announced that they had disqualified Armstrong from all his results since 1998, including his victory in the 2003 Tour de France. The Union Cycliste Internationale, responsible for the international cycling, confirmed this verdict on 22 October 2012.)	
	Second	Jan Ullrich (GER)	(Team Bianchi)
	Third	Alexander Vinokourov (KAZ)	(Team Telekom)
Jersey awarded to the points classification winner	Points	Baden Cooke (AUS)	(FDJeux.com)
Jersey awarded to the mountains classification winner	Mountains	Richard Virenque (FRA)	(Quick-Step–Davitamon)
Jersey awarded to the youth classification winner	Youth	Denis Menchov (RUS)	(iBanesto.com)
Jersey awarded to the combativity classification winner	Combativity	Alexander Vinokourov (KAZ)	(Team Telekom)
	Team	Team CSC	

The 2003 Tour de France was a multiple stage bicycle race held from 5 to 27 July, and the 90th edition of the Tour de France. It has no overall winner—although American cyclist Lance Armstrong originally won the event, the United States Anti-Doping Agency announced in August 2012 that they had disqualified Armstrong from all his results since 1998, including his seven Tour de France wins from 1999 to 2005; the Union Cycliste Internationale has confirmed this verdict.

The event started and ended in Paris, covering 3,427 km (2,129 mi) proceeding clockwise in twenty stages around France, including six major mountain stages. Due to the centennial celebration, this edition of the tour was raced entirely in France and did not enter neighboring countries.

In the centenary year of the race the route recreated, in part, that of 1903. There was a special Centenaire Classement prize for the best-placed in each of the six stage finishes which match the 1903 tour – Lyon, Marseille, Toulouse, Bordeaux, Nantes and Paris. It was won by Stuart O'Grady, with Thor Hushovd in second place. The 2003 Tour was honored with the Prince of Asturias Award for Sport.

Of the 198 riders the favourite was again Armstrong, aiming for a record equalling fifth win. Before the race, it was believed that his main rivals would include Iban Mayo, Aitor González, Tyler Hamilton, Ivan Basso, Gilberto Simoni, Jan Ullrich, and Joseba Beloki but Armstrong was the odds-on favourite. Though he did go on to win the race, it is statistically, and by Armstrong's own admission, his weakest Tour from his seven-year period of dominance over the race.

== Teams ==
The team selection was done in three rounds: in November 2002, the fourteen highest-ranking Union Cycliste Internationale (UCI) teams would automatically qualify; four wildcard invitations were given in January 2003, and four more in mid-May. The race started with 22 teams of 9 cyclists.

The teams entering the race were:

Qualified teams

- Alessio
- Team Bianchi
- Team CSC
- Cofidis
- iBanesto.com
- Gerolsteiner
- Fassa Bortolo
- Kelme–Costa Blanca
- Lotto–Domo
- ONCE–Eroski
- Rabobank
- Team Telekom
- U.S. Postal Service
- Vini Caldirola–So.di

Invited teams

- AG2R Prévoyance
- Brioches La Boulangère
- Crédit Agricole
- Euskaltel–Euskadi
- FDJeux.com
- Jean Delatour
- Saeco
- Quick-Step–Davitamon

== Pre-race favourites ==
Some notable cyclists excluded from the race were Mario Cipollini and Marco Pantani, whose teams De Nardi–Colpack and Mercatone Uno–Scanavino were not selected. Especially the absence of Cipollini, the reigning world champion, came as a surprise. The Tour organisation gave the reason that Cipollini had never been able to finish the race.

In the first round, the Coast team had been selected to compete, and in January 2003 they signed Jan Ullrich. Financial problems then almost prevented the team from starting, but after Bianchi stepped in as a new sponsor, Team Bianchi was allowed to take the place of Team Coast.

== Route and stages ==
The route of the centenary Tour de France was announced in October 2002. The route recreated, in part, that of the 1903 Tour de France. Starting in Paris with a time trial, the race headed clockwise around France including six stage finishes at cities that featured in the 1903 Tour – Lyon, Marseille, Toulouse, Bordeaux, Nantes and Paris. The highest point of elevation in the race was 2,642 m (8,668 ft) at the summit of the Col du Galibier mountain pass on stage 8. Due to the centennial celebration, this edition of the tour was raced entirely in France and did not enter neighboring countries.

Stage characteristics and winners
Stage	Date	Course	Distance	Type	Winner
P	5 July	Paris	6.5 km (4.0 mi)	Individual time trial	Bradley McGee (AUS)
1	6 July	Saint-Denis to Meaux	168.0 km (104.4 mi)	Flat stage	Alessandro Petacchi (ITA)
2	7 July	La Ferté-sous-Jouarre to Sedan	204.5 km (127.1 mi)	Flat stage	Baden Cooke (AUS)
3	8 July	Charleville-Mézières to Saint-Dizier	167.5 km (104.1 mi)	Flat stage	Alessandro Petacchi (ITA)
4	9 July	Joinville to Saint-Dizier	69.0 km (42.9 mi)	Team time trial	U.S. Postal Service (USA)
5	10 July	Troyes to Nevers	196.5 km (122.1 mi)	Flat stage	Alessandro Petacchi (ITA)
6	11 July	Nevers to Lyon	230.0 km (142.9 mi)	Flat stage	Alessandro Petacchi (ITA)
7	12 July	Lyon to Morzine	230.5 km (143.2 mi)	Mountain Stage (s)	Richard Virenque (FRA)
8	13 July	Sallanches to Alpe d'Huez	219.0 km (136.1 mi)	Mountain Stage (s)	Iban Mayo (ESP)
9	14 July	Le Bourg-d'Oisans to Gap	184.5 km (114.6 mi)	Mountain Stage (s)	Alexander Vinokourov (KAZ)
10	15 July	Gap to Marseille	219.5 km (136.4 mi)	Flat stage	Jakob Piil (DEN)
	16 July	Narbonne		Rest day	
11	17 July	Narbonne to Toulouse	153.5 km (95.4 mi)	Flat stage	Juan Antonio Flecha (ESP)
12	18 July	Gaillac to Cap Découverte	47.0 km (29.2 mi)	Individual time trial	Jan Ullrich (GER)
13	19 July	Toulouse to Ax 3 Domaines	197.5 km (122.7 mi)	Mountain Stage (s)	Carlos Sastre (ESP)
14	20 July	Saint-Girons to Loudenvielle	191.5 km (119.0 mi)	Mountain Stage (s)	Gilberto Simoni (ITA)
15	21 July	Bagnères-de-Bigorre to Luz Ardiden	159.5 km (99.1 mi)	Mountain Stage (s)	~~Lance Armstrong (USA)~~
	22 July	Pau		Rest day	
16	23 July	Pau to Bayonne	197.5 km (122.7 mi)	Hilly stage	Tyler Hamilton (USA)
17	24 July	Dax to Bordeaux	181.0 km (112.5 mi)	Flat stage	Servais Knaven (NED)
18	25 July	Bordeaux to Saint-Maixent-l'École	203.5 km (126.4 mi)	Flat stage	Pablo Lastras (ESP)
19	26 July	Pornic to Nantes	49.0 km (30.4 mi)	Individual time trial	David Millar (GBR)
20	27 July	Ville-d'Avray to Paris (Champs-Élysées)	152.0 km (94.4 mi)	Flat stage	Jean-Patrick Nazon (FRA)
	Total		3,427 km (2,129 mi)		

== Race overview ==
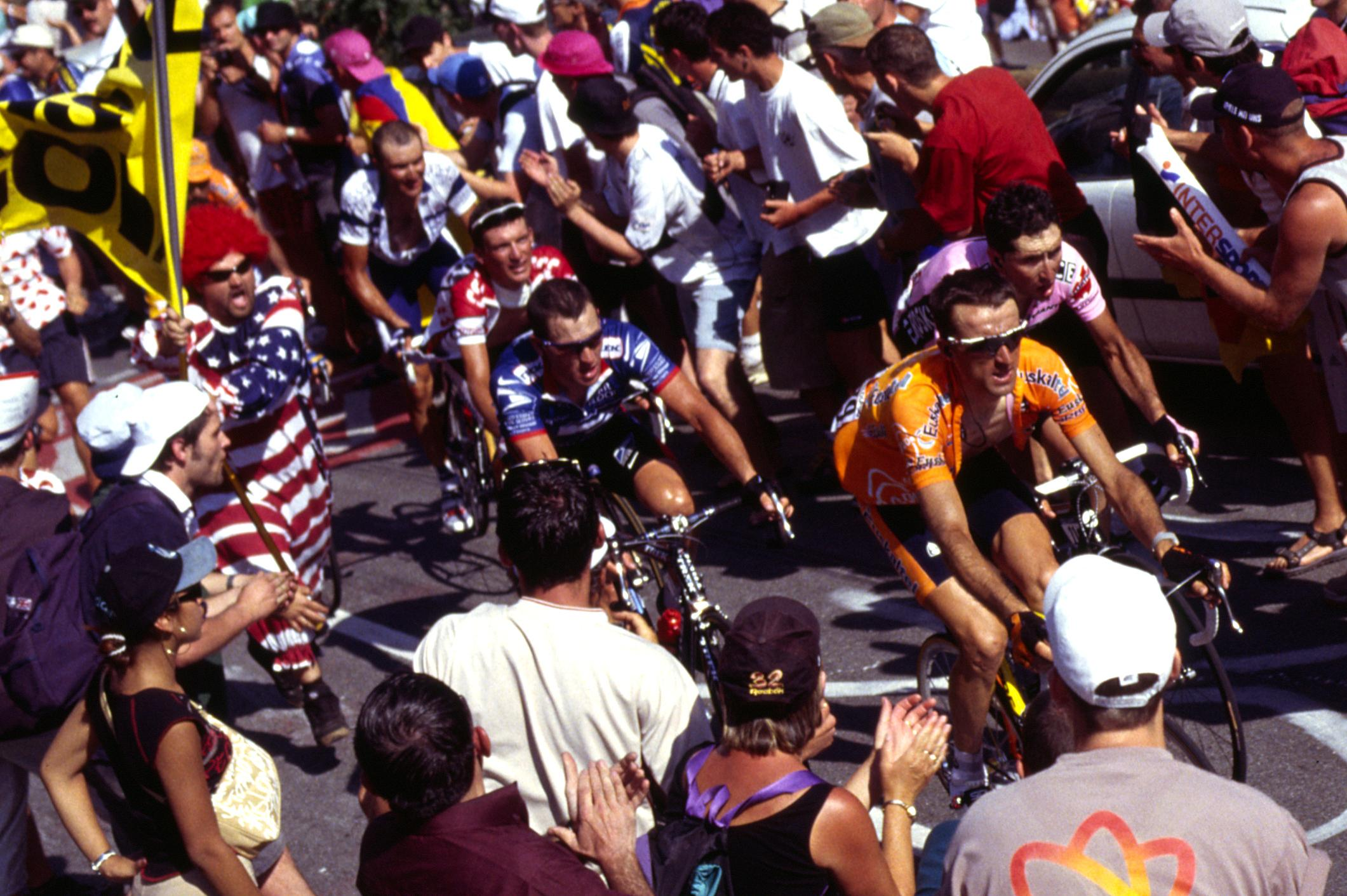
Laiseka, Basso, Hamilton, Armstrong, Beloki and Zubeldia riding up to Alpe d'Huez on the eighth stage

The Tour proved to be one more hotly contested than the previous years. Tyler Hamilton and Levi Leipheimer were involved in a crash early in the Tour. Leipheimer dropped out, Hamilton continued and got fourth place in the end while riding with a broken collarbone.

In the Alps, Gilberto Simoni and Stefano Garzelli, first and second in the Giro d'Italia earlier the same year, could not keep up with Lance Armstrong and the other favourites. The same held for last year's number 4, Santiago Botero. Joseba Beloki could, and was in second-place overall (just 40 seconds behind Armstrong) when he crashed on a fast descent from the Cote de La Rochette, shortly after passing the Col de Manse into Gap. The crash was a result of a locked brake, caused by a lack of traction from melting tar on the road, which led to the tyre coming off the rim. Beloki broke his right femur, elbow and wrist, and had to leave the Tour. Armstrong made a detour through the field beside the road to avoid the fallen Beloki. Armstrong was in yellow, but Jan Ullrich won the first time trial by one minute and 36 seconds. He and Alexander Vinokourov were both within very short distance from Armstrong.

=== Doping ===
Subsequent to Armstrong's statement to withdraw his fight against United States Anti-Doping Agency's (USADA) charges, on 24 August 2012, the USADA said it would ban Armstrong for life and stripped him of his record seven Tour de France titles. Later that day it was confirmed in a USADA statement that Armstrong was banned for life and would be disqualified from any and all competitive results obtained on and subsequent to 1 August 1998, including forfeiture of any medals, titles, winnings, finishes, points and prizes. On 22 October 2012, the Union Cycliste Internationale endorsed the USADA sanctions, and decided not to award victories to any other rider or upgrade other placings in any of the affected events.

== Classification leadership and minor prizes ==
There were four main individual classifications contested in the 2003 Tour de France, as well as a team competition. The most important was the general classification, which was calculated by adding each rider's finishing times on each stage. There were time bonuses given at the end of each mass start stage. If a crash had happened within the final 1 km (0.6 mi) of a stage, not including time trials and summit finishes, the riders involved would have received the same time as the group they were in when the crash occurred. The rider with the lowest cumulative time was the winner of the general classification and was considered the overall winner of the Tour. The rider leading the classification wore a yellow jersey.

The second classification was the points classification. Riders received points for finishing in the highest positions in a stage finish, or in intermediate sprints during the stage. The points available for each stage finish were determined by the stage's type. The leader was identified by a green jersey.

The third classification was the mountains classification. Most stages of the race included one or more categorised climbs, in which points were awarded to the riders that reached the summit first. The climbs were categorised as fourth-, third-, second- or first-category and hors catégorie, with the more difficult climbs rated lower. The leader wore a white jersey with red polka dots.

The final individual classification was the young rider classification. This was calculated the same way as the general classification, but the classification was restricted to riders who were born on or after 1 January 1977. The leader wore a white jersey.

The final classification was a team classification. This was calculated using the finishing times of the best three riders per team on each stage; the leading team was the team with the lowest cumulative time.

There was special classification, the Centenaire, which combined times of riders across the six stages involving cities visited during 1903 Tour. The cities were: Lyon, on stage 6; Marseille, on stage 10; Toulouse, on stage 11; Bordeaux, on stage 17; Nantes, on stage 19; and Paris, on stage 20.

In addition, there was a combativity award given after each mass start stage to the rider considered, by a jury, to have "shown the greatest effort and demonstrated the greatest sporting spirit". The winner wore a red number bib the following stage. At the conclusion of the Tour, Alexander Vinokourov (Team Telekom) won the overall super-combativity award.

There were also two special awards each with a prize of €5000, the Souvenir Henri Desgrange, given in honour of Tour founder and first race director Henri Desgrange to the first rider to pass the summit of the Col du Galibier on stage 8, and the Souvenir Jacques Goddet, given in honour of the second director Jacques Goddet to the first rider to pass the summit of the Col du Tourmalet on stage 15. Stefano Garzelli won the Henri Desgrange and Sylvain Chavanel won the Jacques Goddet.

Classification leadership by stage
Stage	Winner	General classification	Points classification	Mountains classification	Young rider classification	Team classification	Combativity award
P	Bradley McGee	Bradley McGee	Bradley McGee	no award	Vladimir Karpets	U.S. Postal Service	no award
1	Alessandro Petacchi	Bradley McGee	Robbie McEwen	Christophe Mengin	Andy Flickinger	U.S. Postal Service	Andy Flickinger
2	Baden Cooke	Bradley McGee	Robbie McEwen	Christophe Mengin	Baden Cooke	U.S. Postal Service	Frédéric Finot
3	Alessandro Petacchi	Jean-Patrick Nazon	Robbie McEwen	Christophe Mengin	Baden Cooke	U.S. Postal Service	Anthony Geslin
4	U.S. Postal Service	Víctor Hugo Peña	Robbie McEwen	Christophe Mengin	Vladimir Karpets	U.S. Postal Service	no award
5	Alessandro Petacchi	Víctor Hugo Peña	Robbie McEwen	Frédéric Finot	Vladimir Karpets	U.S. Postal Service	Frédéric Finot
6	Alessandro Petacchi	Víctor Hugo Peña	Alessandro Petacchi	Christophe Mengin	Vladimir Karpets	U.S. Postal Service	René Andrle
7	Richard Virenque	Richard Virenque	Baden Cooke	Richard Virenque	Denis Menchov	Quick-Step–Davitamon	Richard Virenque
8	Iban Mayo	~~Lance Armstrong~~	Baden Cooke	Richard Virenque	Denis Menchov	Euskaltel–Euskadi	Nicolas Portal
9	Alexander Vinokourov	~~Lance Armstrong~~	Baden Cooke	Richard Virenque	Denis Menchov	Euskaltel–Euskadi	Jörg Jaksche
10	Jakob Piil	~~Lance Armstrong~~	Baden Cooke	Richard Virenque	Denis Menchov	Team CSC	José Gutiérrez
11	Juan Antonio Flecha	~~Lance Armstrong~~	Baden Cooke	Richard Virenque	Denis Menchov	Team CSC	Juan Antonio Flecha
12	Jan Ullrich	~~Lance Armstrong~~	Baden Cooke	Richard Virenque	Denis Menchov	iBanesto.com	no award
13	Carlos Sastre	~~Lance Armstrong~~	Baden Cooke	Richard Virenque	Denis Menchov	Team CSC	Carlos Sastre
14	Gilberto Simoni	~~Lance Armstrong~~	Baden Cooke	Richard Virenque	Denis Menchov	Team CSC	Laurent Dufaux
15	~~Lance Armstrong~~	~~Lance Armstrong~~	Baden Cooke	Richard Virenque	Denis Menchov	Team CSC	Sylvain Chavanel
16	Tyler Hamilton	~~Lance Armstrong~~	Baden Cooke	Richard Virenque	Denis Menchov	Team CSC	Tyler Hamilton
17	Servais Knaven	~~Lance Armstrong~~	Baden Cooke	Richard Virenque	Denis Menchov	Team CSC	Servais Knaven
18	Pablo Lastras	~~Lance Armstrong~~	Robbie McEwen	Richard Virenque	Denis Menchov	Team CSC	Andy Flickinger
19	David Millar	~~Lance Armstrong~~	Robbie McEwen	Richard Virenque	Denis Menchov	Team CSC	no award
20	Jean-Patrick Nazon	~~Lance Armstrong~~	Baden Cooke	Richard Virenque	Denis Menchov	Team CSC	Bram de Groot
Final		~~Lance Armstrong~~	Baden Cooke	Richard Virenque	Denis Menchov	Team CSC	Alexander Vinokourov

- In stage 1, David Millar wore the green jersey.
- In stage 8, Rolf Aldag wore the polka-dot jersey.

== Final standings ==
Legend
Green jersey	Denotes the leader of the points classification	Polka dot jersey	Denotes the leader of the mountains classification
White jersey	Denotes the leader of the young rider classification	A white jersey with a red number bib.	Denotes the winner of the super-combativity award

=== General classification ===
Final general classification (1–10)
Rank	Rider	Team	Time
DSQ	~~Lance Armstrong (USA)~~	~~U.S. Postal Service~~	~~83h 41' 12"~~
2	Jan Ullrich (GER)	Team Bianchi	+ 1' 01"
3	Alexander Vinokourov (KAZ)	Team Telekom	+ 4' 14"
4	Tyler Hamilton (USA)	Team CSC	+ 6' 17"
5	Haimar Zubeldia (ESP)	Euskaltel–Euskadi	+ 6' 51"
6	Iban Mayo (ESP)	Euskaltel–Euskadi	+ 7' 06"
7	Ivan Basso (ITA)	Fassa Bortolo	+ 10' 12"
8	Christophe Moreau (FRA)	Crédit Agricole	+ 12' 28"
9	Carlos Sastre (ESP)	Team CSC	+ 18' 49"
10	Francisco Mancebo (ESP)	iBanesto.com	+ 19' 15"

Final general classification (11–147)
Rank	Rider	Team	Time
11	Denis Menchov (RUS)	iBanesto.com	+ 19' 44"
12	Georg Totschnig (AUT)	Gerolsteiner	+ 21' 32"
13	Peter Luttenberger (AUT)	Team CSC	+ 22' 16"
14	Manuel Beltrán (ESP)	U.S. Postal Service	+ 23' 03"
15	Massimiliano Lelli (ITA)	Cofidis	+ 24' 00"
16	Richard Virenque (FRA)	Quick-Step–Davitamon	+ 25' 31"
17	Jörg Jaksche (GER)	ONCE–Eroski	+ 27' 22"
18	Roberto Laiseka (ESP)	Euskaltel–Euskadi	+ 29' 15"
19	José-Luis Rubiera (ESP)	U.S. Postal Service	+ 29' 37"
20	Didier Rous (FRA)	Brioches La Boulangère	+ 30' 14"
21	Laurent Dufaux (SUI)	Alessio	+ 33' 17"
22	David Plaza (ESP)	Team Bianchi	+ 45' 55"
23	Félix García Casas (ESP)	Team Bianchi	+ 47' 07"
24	Alexander Bocharov (RUS)	AG2R Prévoyance	+ 49' 47"
25	Daniele Nardello (ITA)	Team Telekom	+ 53' 14"
26	José Bento Azevedo (POR)	ONCE–Eroski	+ 54' 31"
27	Javier Pascual Llorente (ESP)	Kelme–Costa Blanca	+ 57' 00"
28	Grischa Niermann (GER)	Rabobank	+ 1h 00' 32"
29	Mikel Astarloza (ESP)	AG2R Prévoyance	+ 1h 02' 13"
30	Íñigo Chaurreau (ESP)	AG2R Prévoyance	+ 1h 03' 35"
31	Stéphane Goubert (FRA)	Jean Delatour	+ 1h 05' 38"
32	Michael Boogerd (NED)	Rabobank	+ 1h 07' 55"
33	Laurent Brochard (FRA)	AG2R Prévoyance	+ 1h 09' 35"
34	Roberto Heras (ESP)	U.S. Postal Service	+ 1h 14' 17"
35	Giuseppe Guerini (ITA)	Team Telekom	+ 1h 16' 43"
36	Juan Miguel Mercado (ESP)	iBanesto.com	+ 1h 22' 32"
37	Sylvain Chavanel (FRA)	Brioches La Boulangère	+ 1h 25' 01"
38	Jörg Ludewig (GER)	Saeco	+ 1h 25' 13"
39	Andy Flickinger (FRA)	AG2R Prévoyance	+ 1h 28' 53"
40	Patrice Halgand (FRA)	Jean Delatour	+ 1h 30' 42"
41	José Enrique Gutiérrez (ESP)	Kelme–Costa Blanca	+ 1h 35' 51"
42	Michael Rogers (AUS)	Quick-Step–Davitamon	+ 1h 37' 28"
43	David Moncoutié (FRA)	Cofidis	+ 1h 38' 49"
44	Nicki Sørensen (DEN)	Team CSC	+ 1h 39' 54"
45	Michael Blaudzun (DEN)	Team CSC	+ 1h 41' 09"
46	Iván Ramiro Parra (COL)	Kelme–Costa Blanca	+ 1h 44' 01"
47	George Hincapie (USA)	U.S. Postal Service	+ 1h 44' 11"
48	Paolo Bettini (ITA)	Quick-Step–Davitamon	+ 1h 45' 09"
49	Matthias Kessler (GER)	Team Telekom	+ 1h 45' 17"
50	Vladimir Miholjević (CRO)	Alessio	+ 1h 45' 59"
51	Xabier Zandio (ESP)	iBanesto.com	+ 1h 48' 53"
52	Christophe Brandt (BEL)	Lotto–Domo	+ 1h 50' 33"
53	Evgueni Petrov (RUS)	iBanesto.com	+ 1h 52' 03"
54	Andrea Peron (ITA)	Team CSC	+ 1h 53' 45"
55	David Millar (GBR)	Cofidis	+ 1h 54' 38"
56	David Cañada (ESP)	Quick-Step–Davitamon	+ 1h 58' 01"
57	Ángel Casero (ESP)	Team Bianchi	+ 1h 58' 32"
58	Mikel Pradera (ESP)	ONCE–Eroski	+ 1h 59' 37"
59	Walter Bénéteau (FRA)	Brioches La Boulangère	+ 2h 00' 09"
60	Fabio Sacchi (ITA)	Saeco	+ 2h 00' 56"
61	Udo Bölts (GER)	Gerolsteiner	+ 2h 01' 38"
62	Kurt Van De Wouwer (BEL)	Quick-Step–Davitamon	+ 2h 02' 01"
63	Guido Trentin (ITA)	Cofidis	+ 2h 02' 02"
64	Gerrit Glomser (AUT)	Saeco	+ 2h 02' 11"
65	Laurent Lefèvre (FRA)	Jean Delatour	+ 2h 03' 39"
66	Marzio Bruseghin (ITA)	Fassa Bortolo	+ 2h 06' 00"
67	Pablo Lastras (ESP)	iBanesto.com	+ 2h 06' 30"
68	Marcos Antonio Serrano (ESP)	ONCE–Eroski	+ 2h 07' 26"
69	Luca Paolini (ITA)	Quick-Step–Davitamon	+ 2h 10' 30"
70	Aitor Garmendia (ESP)	Team Bianchi	+ 2h 10' 41"
71	Jérôme Pineau (FRA)	Brioches La Boulangère	+ 2h 11' 33"
72	Isidro Nozal (ESP)	ONCE–Eroski	+ 2h 12' 14"
73	David Latasa (ESP)	Kelme–Costa Blanca	+ 2h 12' 58"
74	Andrea Noè (ITA)	Alessio	+ 2h 17' 58"
75	Franco Pellizotti (ITA)	Alessio	+ 2h 20' 52"
76	Viatcheslav Ekimov (RUS)	U.S. Postal Service	+ 2h 21' 53"
77	Floyd Landis (USA)	U.S. Postal Service	+ 2h 25' 19"
78	Nicolas Fritsch (FRA)	FDJeux.com	+ 2h 26' 58"
79	Dario David Cioni (ITA)	Fassa Bortolo	+ 2h 31' 37"
80	Mikel Artetxe (ESP)	Euskaltel–Euskadi	+ 2h 34' 10"
81	Salvatore Commesso (ITA)	Saeco	+ 2h 34' 47"
82	Nicolas Portal (FRA)	AG2R Prévoyance	+ 2h 35' 04"
83	René Andrle (CZE)	ONCE–Eroski	+ 2h 35' 17"
84	Gilberto Simoni (ITA)	Saeco	+ 2h 35' 47"
85	Yuriy Krivtsov (UKR)	Jean Delatour	+ 2h 36' 01"
86	Serge Baguet (BEL)	Lotto–Domo	+ 2h 37' 20"
87	Steve Zampieri (SUI)	Vini Caldirola–So.di	+ 2h 40' 28"
88	Víctor Hugo Peña (COL)	U.S. Postal Service	+ 2h 40' 49"
89	Mario Aerts (BEL)	Team Telekom	+ 2h 40' 50"
90	Stuart O'Grady (AUS)	Crédit Agricole	+ 2h 41' 24"
91	Ludovic Turpin (FRA)	AG2R Prévoyance	+ 2h 43' 44"
92	Markus Zberg (SUI)	Gerolsteiner	+ 2h 47' 07"
93	Carlos De La Cruz (FRA)	FDJeux.com	+ 2h 47' 54"
94	Rolf Aldag (GER)	Team Telekom	+ 2h 48' 34"
95	Franck Rénier (BEL)	Brioches La Boulangère	+ 2h 48' 54"
96	Óscar Freire (ESP)	Rabobank	+ 2h 51' 18"
97	Cédric Vasseur (FRA)	Cofidis	+ 2h 51' 58"
98	Alberto Lopez (ESP)	Euskaltel–Euskadi	+ 2h 52' 45"
99	Bram de Groot (NED)	Rabobank	+ 2h 56' 35"
100	Vladimir Karpets (RUS)	iBanesto.com	+ 2h 57' 09"
101	Iñigo Landaluze (ESP)	Euskaltel–Euskadi	+ 3h 02' 37"
102	Pavel Padrnos (CZE)	U.S. Postal Service	+ 3h 05' 34"
103	Fabrizio Guidi (ITA)	Team Bianchi	+ 3h 06' 23"
104	Juan Antonio Flecha (ESP)	iBanesto.com	+ 3h 09' 07"
105	Médéric Clain (FRA)	Cofidis	+ 3h 09' 22"
106	Nicolas Jalabert (FRA)	Team CSC	+ 3h 11' 36"
107	Erik Zabel (GER)	Team Telekom	+ 3h 11' 39"
108	László Bodrogi (HUN)	Quick-Step–Davitamon	+ 3h 12' 20"
109	Benoît Poilvet (FRA)	Crédit Agricole	+ 3h 14' 11"
110	Christophe Mengin (FRA)	FDJeux.com	+ 3h 14' 47"
111	Sandy Casar (FRA)	FDJeux.com	+ 3h 19' 43"
112	Paolo Fornaciari (ITA)	Saeco	+ 3h 20' 14"
113	Jakob Piil (DEN)	Team CSC	+ 3h 20' 57"
114	Anthony Geslin (FRA)	Brioches La Boulangère	+ 3h 21' 01"
115	Marc Wauters (BEL)	Rabobank	+ 3h 21' 43"
116	Romans Vainsteins (LAT)	Vini Caldirola–So.di	+ 3h 23' 43"
117	Nicolas Vogondy (FRA)	FDJeux.com	+ 3h 25' 22"
118	Thor Hushovd (NOR)	Crédit Agricole	+ 3h 25' 33"
119	Thomas Voeckler (FRA)	Brioches La Boulangère	+ 3h 28' 18"
120	Bekim Leif Christensen (DEN)	Team CSC	+ 3h 28' 23"
121	Christophe Oriol (FRA)	AG2R Prévoyance	+ 3h 29' 35"
122	Álvaro González de Galdeano (ESP)	ONCE–Eroski	+ 3h 32' 37"
123	Servais Knaven (NED)	Quick-Step–Davitamon	+ 3h 33' 45"
124	Philippe Gaumont (FRA)	Cofidis	+ 3h 34' 57"
125	José Vicente Garcia (ESP)	iBanesto.com	+ 3h 35' 10"
126	Davide Bramati (ITA)	Quick-Step–Davitamon	+ 3h 36' 10"
127	Íñigo Cuesta (ESP)	Cofidis	+ 3h 37' 12"
128	Koos Moerenhout (NED)	Lotto–Domo	+ 3h 38' 38"
129	Damien Nazon (FRA)	Brioches La Boulangère	+ 3h 39' 58"
130	Maryan Hary (FRA)	Brioches La Boulangère	+ 3h 40' 55"
131	Christophe Edaleine (FRA)	Jean Delatour	+ 3h 45' 18"
132	Léon van Bon (NED)	Lotto–Domo	+ 3h 51' 56"
133	Bradley McGee (AUS)	FDJeux.com	+ 3h 52' 49"
134	Paolo Bossoni (ITA)	Vini Caldirola–So.di	+ 3h 54' 39"
135	Jean-Patrick Nazon (FRA)	Jean Delatour	+ 3h 56' 38"
136	Thomas Liese (GER)	Team Bianchi	+ 3h 56' 49"
137	Frédéric Finot (FRA)	Jean Delatour	+ 3h 57' 53"
138	Sébastien Hinault (FRA)	Crédit Agricole	+ 4h 00' 26"
139	David Muñoz (ESP)	Kelme–Costa Blanca	+ 4h 03' 40"
140	Baden Cooke (AUS)	FDJeux.com	+ 4h 04' 10"
141	Samuel Dumoulin (FRA)	Jean Delatour	+ 4h 04' 59"
142	Julian Usano (ESP)	Kelme–Costa Blanca	+ 4h 05' 46"
143	Robbie McEwen (AUS)	Lotto–Domo	+ 4h 13' 28"
144	Dario Andriotto (ITA)	Vini Caldirola–So.di	+ 4h 14' 48"
145	Daniel Becke (GER)	Team Bianchi	+ 4h 26' 08"
146	Alessandro Bertolini (ITA)	Alessio	+ 4h 27' 59"
147	Hans De Clercq (BEL)	Lotto–Domo	+ 4h 48' 35"

=== Points classification ===
Final points classification (1–10)
Rank	Rider	Team	Points
1	Baden Cooke (AUS)	FDJeux.com	216
2	Robbie McEwen (AUS)	Lotto–Domo	214
3	Erik Zabel (DEU)	Team Telekom	188
4	Thor Hushovd (NOR)	Crédit Agricole	173
5	Luca Paolini (ITA)	Quick-Step–Davitamon	156
6	Jean-Patrick Nazon (FRA)	Jean Delatour	154
7	Stuart O'Grady (AUS)	Crédit Agricole	153
8	Fabrizio Guidi (ITA)	Team Bianchi	122
9	Jan Ullrich (GER)	Team Bianchi	112
10	Damien Nazon (FRA)	Brioches La Boulangère	107

=== Mountains classification ===
Final mountains classification (1–10)
Rank	Rider	Team	Points
1	Richard Virenque (FRA)	Quick-Step–Davitamon	324
2	Laurent Dufaux (SUI)	Alessio	187
3	~~Lance Armstrong (USA)~~	~~U.S. Postal Service~~	~~168~~
4	Christophe Moreau (FRA)	Crédit Agricole	137
5	Juan Miguel Mercado (ESP)	iBanesto.com	136
6	Iban Mayo (ESP)	Euskaltel–Euskadi	130
7	Haimar Zubeldia (ESP)	Euskaltel–Euskadi	125
8	Jan Ullrich (GER)	Team Bianchi	124
9	Tyler Hamilton (USA)	Team CSC	116
10	Paolo Bettini (ITA)	Quick-Step–Davitamon	100

=== Young rider classification ===
Final young rider classification (1–10)
Rank	Rider	Team	Time
1	Denis Menchov (RUS)	iBanesto.com	84h 0' 56"
2	Mikel Astarloza (ESP)	AG2R Prévoyance	+ 42' 29"
3	Juan Miguel Mercado (ESP)	iBanesto.com	+ 1h 02' 48"
4	Sylvain Chavanel (FRA)	Brioches La Boulangère	+ 1h 05' 17"
5	Andy Flickinger (FRA)	AG2R Prévoyance	+ 1h 09' 09"
6	Michael Rogers (AUS)	Quick-Step–Davitamon	+ 1h 17' 44"
7	Matthias Kessler (GER)	Team Telekom	+ 1h 25' 33"
8	Evgeni Petrov (RUS)	iBanesto.com	+ 1h 32' 19"
9	Jérôme Pineau (FRA)	Brioches La Boulangère	+ 1h 51' 49"
10	Franco Pellizotti (ITA)	Alessio	+ 2h 01' 08"

=== Team classification ===
Final team classification (1–10)
Rank	Team	Time
1	Team CSC	248h 18' 18"
2	iBanesto.com	+ 21' 46"
3	Euskaltel–Euskadi	+ 44' 59"
4	U.S. Postal Service	+ 45' 53"
5	Team Bianchi	+ 1h 12' 40"
6	Team Telekom	+ 1h 38' 45"
7	Quick-Step–Davitamon	+ 2h 02' 17"
8	Brioches La Boulangère	+ 2h 02' 36"
9	AG2R Prévoyance	+ 2h 08' 06"
10	Cofidis	+ 2h 08' 56"

=== Centenaire classification ===
Final centenaire classification (1–10)
Rank	Rider	Team	Points
1	Stuart O'Grady (AUS)	Crédit Agricole	82
2	Thor Hushovd (NOR)	Crédit Agricole	86
3	Fabrizio Guidi (ITA)	Team Bianchi	103
4	Luca Paolini (ITA)	Quick-Step–Davitamon	118
5	Gerrit Glomser (AUT)	Saeco	123
6	Jan Ullrich (GER)	Bianchi	165
7	Damien Nazon (FRA)	Brioches La Boulangère	169
8	Baden Cooke (AUS)	FDJeux.com	184
9	Bradley McGee (AUS)	FDJeux.com	188
10	Christophe Moreau (FRA)	Crédit Agricole	210

== Bibliography ==
- Augendre, Jacques (2016). Guide historique [Historical guide] (PDF) (in French). Paris: Amaury Sport Organisation. Archived (PDF) from the original on 17 August 2016.
- Le règlement et les prix [The regulations and prizes] (PDF). Paris: Amaury Sport Organisation. 2004. Archived from the original (PDF) on 17 September 2003.
