= 2002 Dwars door Vlaanderen =

Race details
- Dates: 27 March 2002
- Stages: 1
- Distance: 201 km (124.9 mi)
- Winning time: 5h 14' 00"

Results
	Winner	Baden Cooke (AUS)
	Second	László Bodrogi (HUN)
	Third	Jo Planckaert (BEL)

The 2002 Dwars door Vlaanderen was the 57th edition of the Dwars door Vlaanderen cycle race and was held on 27 March 2002. The race started in Kortrijk and finished in Waregem. The race was won by Baden Cooke.

== General classification ==
Final general classification

Rank	Rider	Time
1	Baden Cooke (AUS)	5h 14' 00"
2	László Bodrogi (HUN)	+ 4"
3	Jo Planckaert (BEL)	+ 4"
4	Peter Van Petegem (BEL)	+ 4"
5	Andy Flickinger (FRA)	+ 4"
6	Niko Eeckhout (BEL)	+ 4"
7	Bert Scheirlinckx (BEL)	+ 4"
8	Lars Michaelsen (DEN)	+ 12"
9	Johan Museeuw (BEL)	+ 12"
10	Hendrik Van Dijck (BEL)	+ 12"
