= Joseba Zubeldia =

Spanish cyclist

Personal information
- Full name: Joseba Zubeldia Agirre
- Born: 19 March 1979 (age 47) Usurbil, Spain

Cycling career
- Sport: Cycling
- Current team: Retired
- Discipline: Road
- Role: Rider

Professional team
- 2002–2007: Euskaltel–Euskadi

Joseba Zubeldia Agirre (born 19 March 1979 in Usurbil, Basque Country) is a Spanish former professional road bicycle racer, who rode professionally between 2002 and 2007, entirely for UCI ProTeam Euskaltel–Euskadi. He is the younger brother of fellow racing cyclist Haimar Zubeldia.
