= Andy Flickinger =

French cyclist

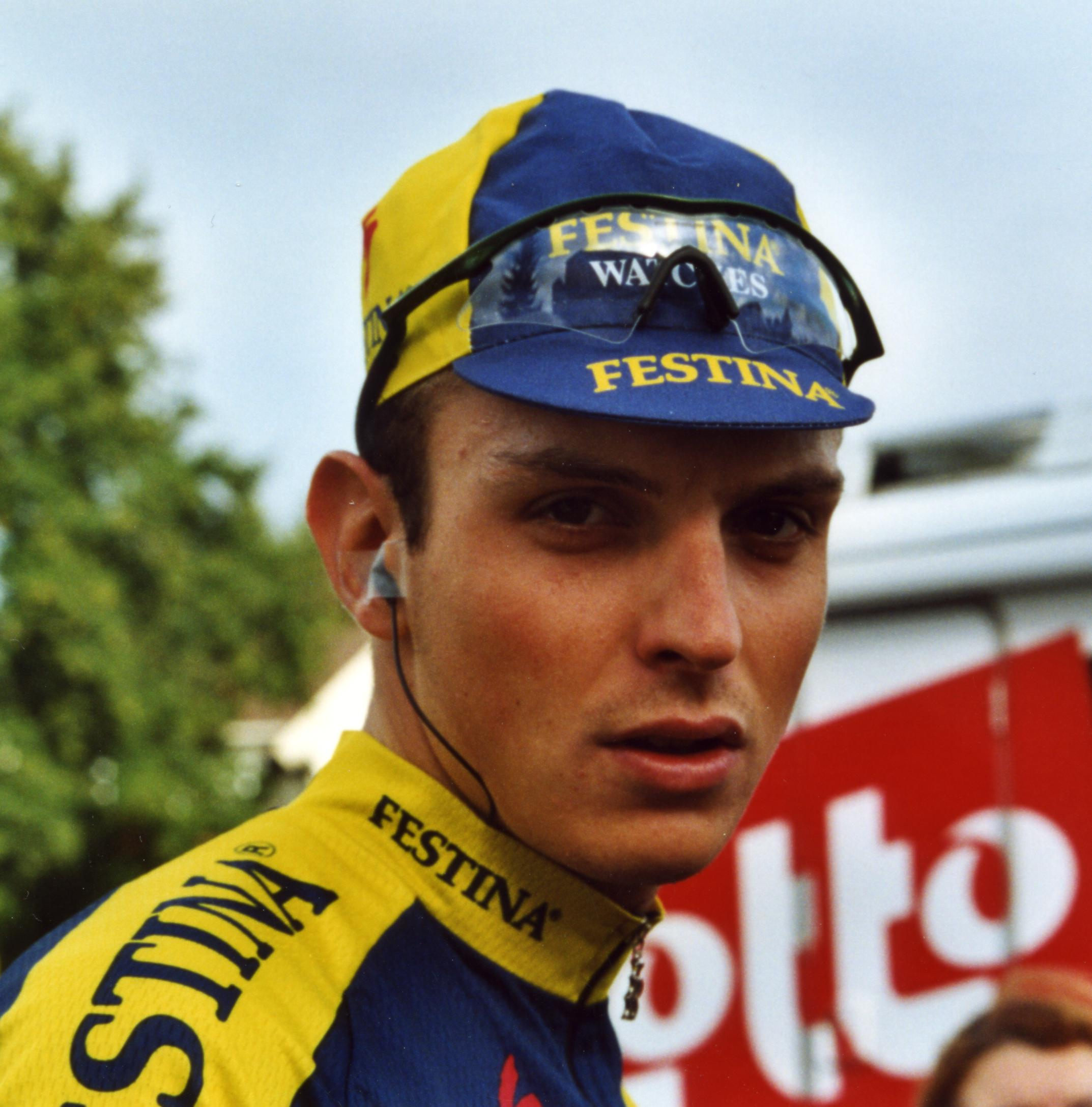

Personal information
- Full name: Andy Flickinger
- Born: 4 November 1978 (age 47) Saint-Martin-d'Hères, France
- Height: 1.93 m (6 ft 4 in)
- Weight: 78 kg (172 lb)

Cycling career
- Sport: Cycling
- Current team: Retired
- Discipline: Road
- Role: Rider

Amateur teams
- 1992–1996: Cyclisme Seyssinet-Seyssins
- 1997–1998: EC Saint-Étienne Loire

Professional teams
- 1999: Casino–Ag2r Prévoyance
- 2000–2001: Festina
- 2002–2005: AG2R Prévoyance
- 2006–2007: Bouygues Télécom

Managerial teams
- 2012–2015: Team Europcar
- 2018–2019: Delko–Marseille Provence KTM

Major wins
- GP Ouest-France (2003)

Andy Flickinger (born 4 November 1978 in Saint-Martin-d'Hères) is a former French professional road bicycle racer. He won the GP Ouest-France in 2003.

== Major results ==
1999
8th Overall Étoile de Bessèges
10th Trofeo Luis Puig
2002
1st Stage 2 Paris–Corrèze
3rd Overall Circuit des Mines
5th Dwars door Vlaanderen
2003
1st GP Ouest-France
1st Classic de l'Indre
1st Bordeaux–Caudéran
Tour de France

Held after Stage 1

3rd A Travers le Morbihan
5th Road race, National Road Championships
5th Kuurne–Brussels–Kuurne
5th Tour de Vendée
2005
1st Stage 2a Circuit de la Sarthe
2007
9th Overall Tour de Picardie
