= Baden Cooke =

Australian cyclist (born 1978)

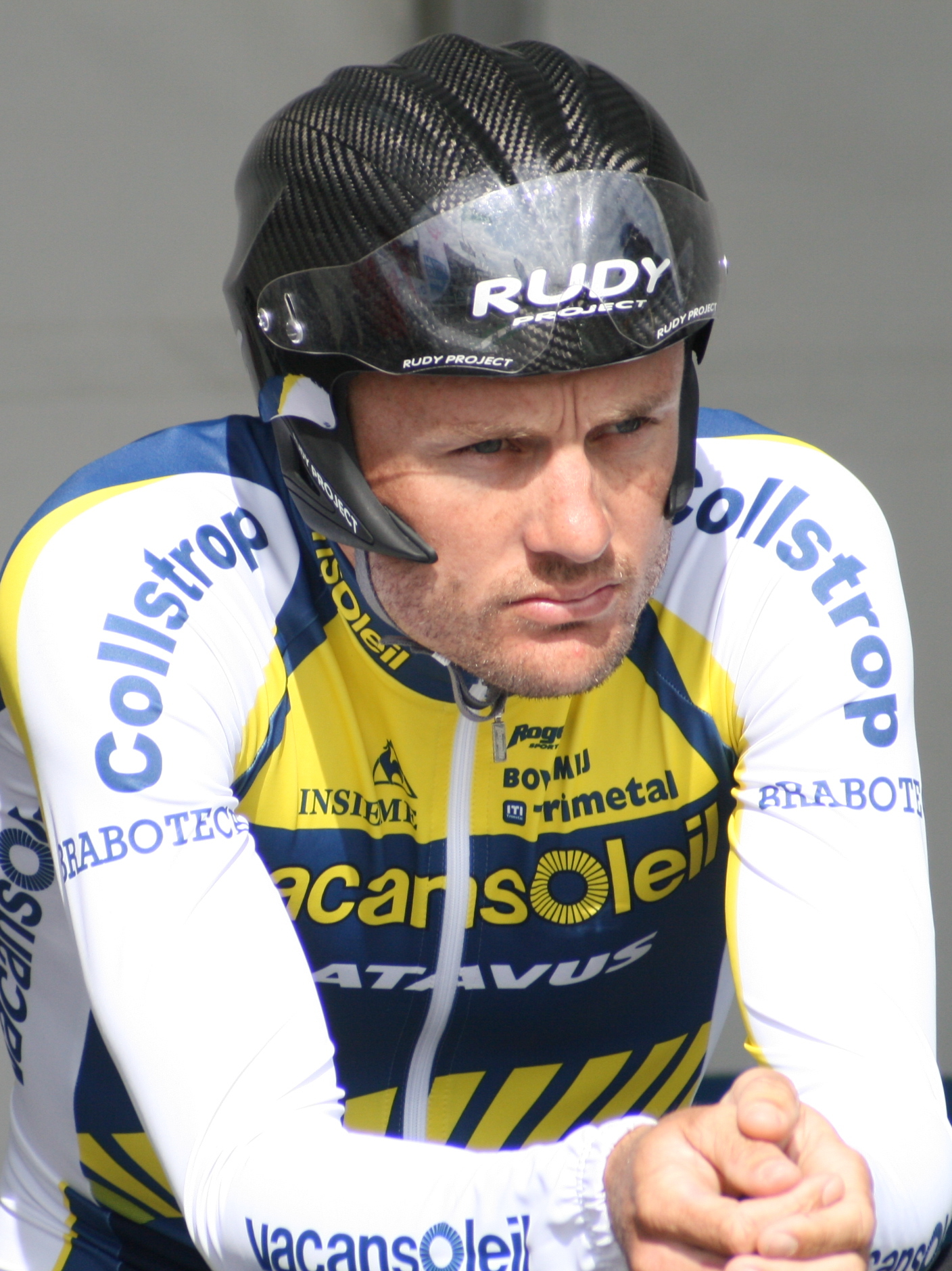
- Cooke at the 2009 Four Days of Dunkirk

Personal information
- Full name: Baden Cooke
- Nickname: "Cookie"
- Born: 12 October 1978 (age 48) Benalla, Victoria, Australia
- Height: 1.80 m (5 ft 11 in)
- Weight: 75 kg (165 lb)

Cycling career
- Sport: Cycling
- Current team: Retired
- Discipline: Road
- Role: Rider
- Rider type: Sprinter

Professional teams
- 2000–2001: Mercury
- 2002–2005: Française des Jeux
- 2006–2007: Unibet.com
- 2008: Barloworld
- 2009: Vacansoleil
- 2010–2011: Team Saxo Bank
- 2012–2013: GreenEDGE

Major wins
- Grand Tours Tour de France Points classification (2003) 1 individual stage (2003) One-day races and Classics Dwars door Vlaanderen (2002)
Medal record
Representing Australia
Men's road bicycle racing
Commonwealth Games
Bronze medal – third place	2002 Manchester	Road race

Baden Cooke (born 12 October 1978) is an Australian retired professional racing cyclist, who competed professionally between 2000 and 2013.

== Early life ==
Born in Benalla, Victoria, Cooke began competitive cycling at 11. He completed secondary school at Galen College in Wangaratta, Victoria, and was an Australian Institute of Sport scholarship holder.

== Career ==
His professional career began with the Mercury team in 2000, though he found racing in Europe to be more challenging than initially expected. Nevertheless, he adapted. He was more successful during that debut season in Australia and America, where he won stages of the Herald Sun Tour and the Sea Otter Classic, respectively. Having moved to the French team Française des Jeux in 2002, Cooke competed in the Commonwealth Games that year, finishing third behind fellow Australians Stuart O'Grady and Cadel Evans. He also participated in the Tour de France in 2002, 2003, 2004, 2005, 2008 and 2012. In 2003 he won the Green jersey which is the Points classification in the Tour de France by two points in a tight finish on Stage 20 on the Champs-Élysées with fellow Australian sprinter Robbie McEwen second and O'Grady seventh in the final points classification. In 2004 Cooke came 12th in the points classification.

Cooke represented Australia in the road race at the 2004 Summer Olympics along with McEwen, Michael Rogers, O'Grady and Matt White.

Cooke raced 2006 and 2007 for Unibet.com. He joined Barloworld for 2008 but in 2009 moved to Dutch cycling team Vacansoleil. Cooke announced on his website that he would ride for Team Saxo Bank in 2010 – he continued with that team in 2011, before moving to the new GreenEDGE team for the 2012 season. After the 2013 season, Cooke retired.

After retiring, Cooke announced that he was moving into rider management. In January 2014 he became the agent of former team-mate and winner of the 2013 Vuelta a España Chris Horner. He subsequently also became agent for Michael Matthews, Gert Steegmans and Janez Brajkovič.

He recently purchased a stake in Factor Bikes and Black Inc wheels.

== Television appearances ==
In 2021, Cooke competed on Australian Survivor: Brains V Brawn.

== Career highlights ==
=== Major results ===
1996
1st National Junior Points Race Championships
1st Bendigo Tour
1st Criterium Bike SA Race
2000
1st Wangaratta Wheelrace
1st National Madison Championships
1st Prix de Bles d'Or
Rapport Tour

1st Points classification
1st Stage 7

Herald Sun Tour

1st Stages 2, 5 & 9
1st Criterium competition

2001
Tour de l'Avenir

1st Points classification
1st Stages 6 & 10

1st Stage 4 Sea Otter Classic
2002
1st Overall Herald Sun Tour

1st Stages 2 & 4

1st Overall Paris–Corrèze

1st Stages 1

1st Dwars door Vlaanderen
1st Tro-Bro Léon
1st Stage 1 GP du Midi Libre
1st Stage 8 Circuit des Mines
3rd Road race, Commonwealth Games
3rd GP Ouest France-Plouay
5th Paris–Brussels
9th Road race, UCI Road World Championships
2003
1st Kampioenschap van Vlaanderen
1st Grand Prix de Fourmies
Tour de France

1st Points classification
1st Stage 2

Tour Down Under

1st Stages 1 & 4

1st Stage 9 Tour de Suisse
1st Stage 3 Tour Méditerranéen
2nd Dwars door Vlaanderen
4th Paris–Tours
7th Paris–Bourges
2004
1st Overall Bay Classic Series
1st Grand Prix d'Ouverture La Marseillaise
Herald Sun Tour

1st Stages 2, 3 & 5

Tour Méditerranéen

1st Stages 1 & 3

1st Stage 2 Three Days of De Panne
3rd Overall Tour Down Under

1st Stage 6

2005
Herald Sun Tour

1st Stages 4 & 5

1st Stage 1 Tour of Poland
5th Dwars door Vlaanderen
6th Gent–Wevelgem
2006
1st Grand Prix d'Ouverture La Marseillaise
1st Halle–Ingooigem
1st Stage 1 Course de la Paix
1st Stage 5 Tour de Wallonie
5th Overall Tour of Denmark
6th Paris–Tours
10th E3 Prijs Vlaanderen
2007
1st Kampioenschap van Vlaanderen
1st Stage 3 Tour Down Under
1st Stage 2 Étoile de Bessèges
4th Paris–Brussels
6th Omloop Het Volk
8th Gent–Wevelgem
2008
1st Stage 2 Clásica Internacional de Alcobendas y Villalba
1st Stage 1 Geelong Bay Classic Series
1st Stage 3 Herald Sun Tour
2009
1st Stage 4 Herald Sun Tour
2010
1st Stage 4 Bay Classic Series
2011
2nd Paris–Bourges
5th Dwars door Vlaanderen
10th Gent–Wevelgem

=== Grand Tour general classification results timeline ===
Grand Tour	2002	2003	2004	2005	2006	2007	2008	2009	2010	2011	2012	2013
Giro d'Italia	—	—	—	DNF	—	—	—	—	DNF	—	—	—
Tour de France	127	140	139	142	—	—	DNF	—	—	—	117	—
/ Vuelta a España	—	—	—	—	—	—	—	—	—	—	—	DNF

Legend
DSQ	Disqualified
DNF	Did not finish
