= La Rochette, Hautes-Alpes =

La Rochette
- Commune
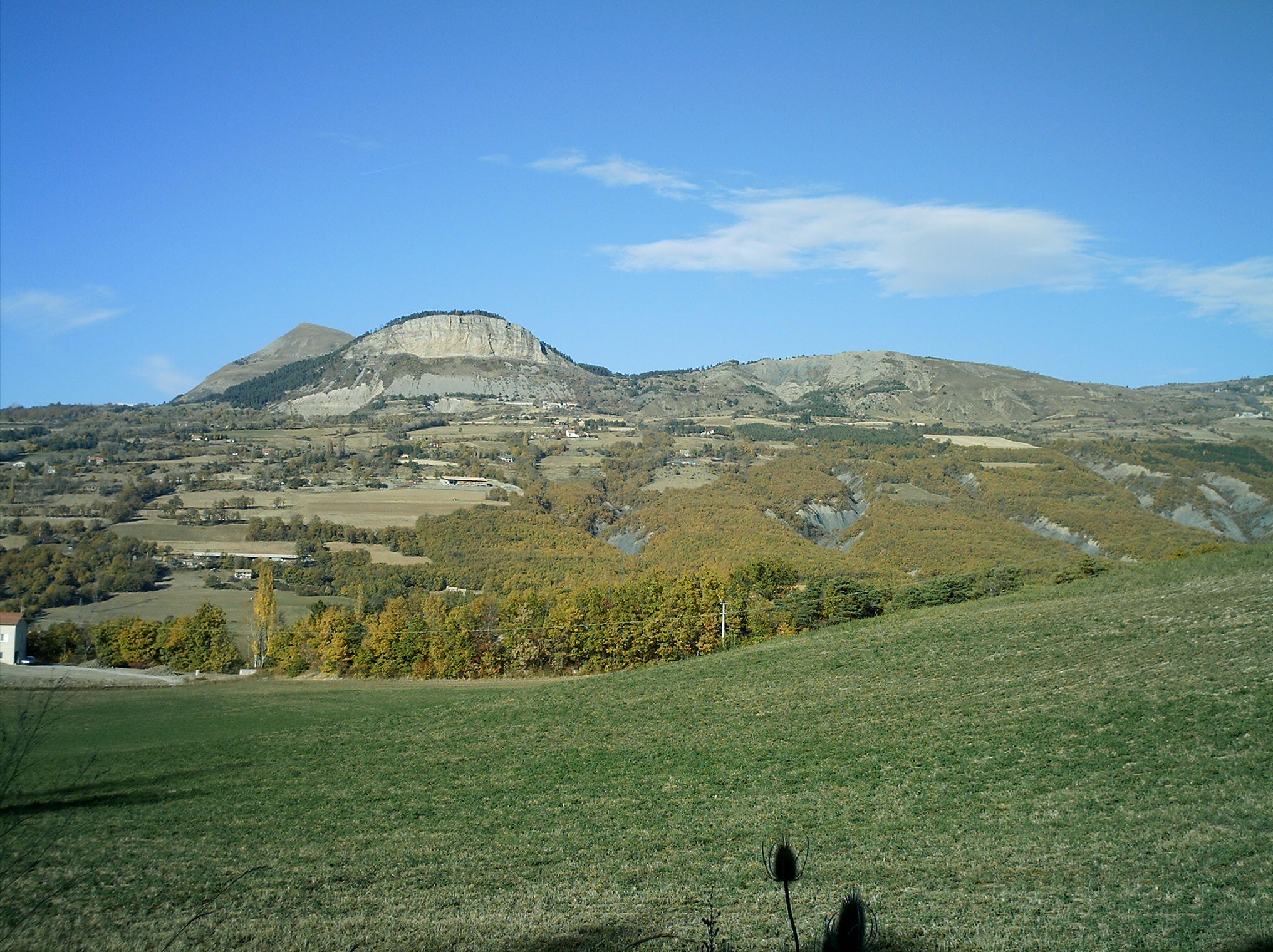
- A view of La Rochette with Napoleon's Hat at 1,425 m (4,675 ft) and Puy de Manse at 1,646 m (5,400 ft)

- Coat of arms
- Location of La Rochette
- Location within France Location within Provence-Alpes-Côte d'Azur
- Coordinates: 44°35′45″N 6°09′23″E
- Country: France
- Region: Provence-Alpes-Côte d'Azur
- Department: Hautes-Alpes
- Arrondissement: Gap
- Canton: Chorges

Government
  - Mayor (2026–32): Marlène Durif
- Area^{1}: 10.34 km^{2} (3.99 sq mi)
- Elevation: 1,100 m (3,600 ft)
- Highest elevation: 1,631 m (5,351 ft)
- Lowest elevation: 779 m (2,556 ft)
- Population (2023): 471
  - Density: 45.6/km^{2} (118/sq mi)
- Time zone: UTC+01:00 (CET)
  - Summer (DST): UTC+02:00 (CEST)
- INSEE/Postal code: 05124 /05000
- ^{1} French Land Register data, which excludes lakes, ponds, glaciers > 1 km^{2} (0.386 sq mi or 247 acres) and river estuaries.

La Rochette (French pronunciation: [la ʁɔʃɛt]; Occitan: La Rocheta) is a commune in the Hautes-Alpes department in southeastern France. It is located about 10 km north east of Gap.

== Population ==
Historical population
Year	Pop.	±% p.a.
1968	282	—
1975	314	+1.55%
1982	368	+2.29%
1990	397	+0.95%
1999	375	−0.63%
2007	375	+0.00%
2012	468	+4.53%
2017	466	−0.09%
2023	471	+0.18%
Source: INSEE

== See also ==
- Communes of the Hautes-Alpes department
