= Haimar Zubeldia =

Spanish cyclist

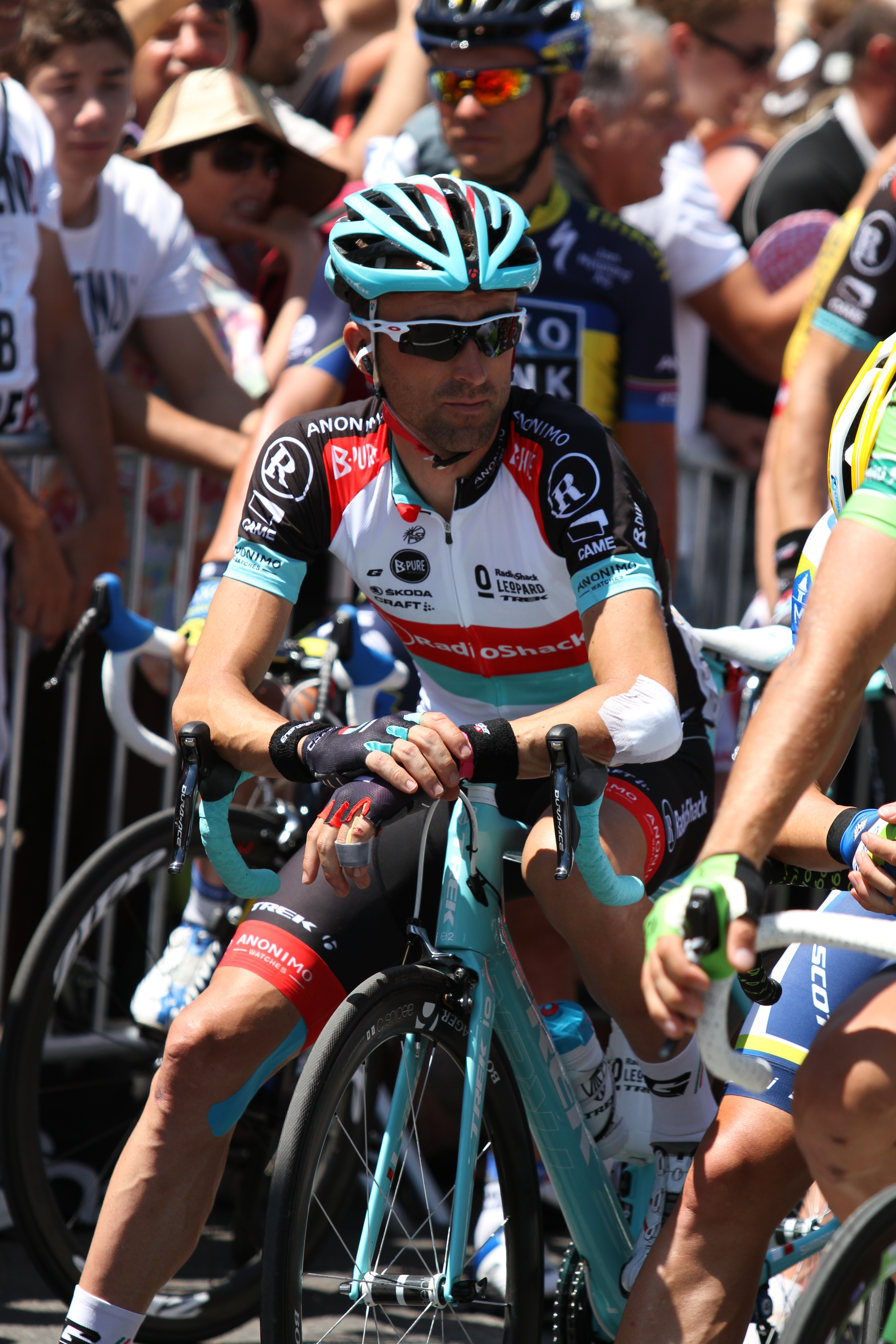
- Zubeldia at the 2013 Tour de France

Personal information
- Full name: Haimar Zubeldia Agirre
- Born: 1 April 1977 (age 49) Usurbil, Gipuzkoa, Basque Country
- Height: 1.79 m (5 ft 10 in)
- Weight: 67 kg (148 lb; 10.6 st)

Cycling career
- Sport: Cycling
- Current team: Retired
- Discipline: Road
- Role: Rider
- Rider type: Climber

Professional teams
- 1998–2008: Euskaltel–Euskadi
- 2009: Astana
- 2010–2011: Team RadioShack
- 2012–2017: RadioShack–Nissan

Major wins
- Grand Tours Tour de France 1 TTT stage (2009) Stage races Euskal Bizikleta (2000) Tour de l'Ain (2010)

Haimar Zubeldia Agirre (born 1 April 1977) is a Spanish former road racing cyclist from the Basque Country, who competed professionally between 1998 and 2017 for the Euskaltel–Euskadi, Astana, Team RadioShack and Trek–Segafredo teams. During his career, Zubeldia recorded five top-ten finishes in the Tour de France, and one in the Vuelta a España.

== Biography ==
Born and raised in Usurbil, Gipuzkoa, Zubeldia currently resides in the neighboring village of Zarautz. His younger brother Joseba Zubeldia also competed as a professional racing cyclist.

At the age of twenty-one, Zubeldia turned professional with Euskaltel–Euskadi in 1998. In 2000, he won the Euskal Bizikleta, and finished second overall in the Critérium du Dauphiné Libéré. After his win in 2000 in the Euskal Bizikleta, it took him ten years to win again, when he won the Tour de l'Ain.

In 2014, Zubeldia became the Spanish rider with the most starts in the Tour de France, a record previously held by two long-term-servants of what is now the Movistar Team, 5-time-winner Miguel Induráin, and José Vicente García. In his career, Zubeldia started 29 Grand Tours – 16 at the Tour de France, 12 at the Vuelta a España and 1 at the Giro d'Italia – finishing 26.

== Major results ==
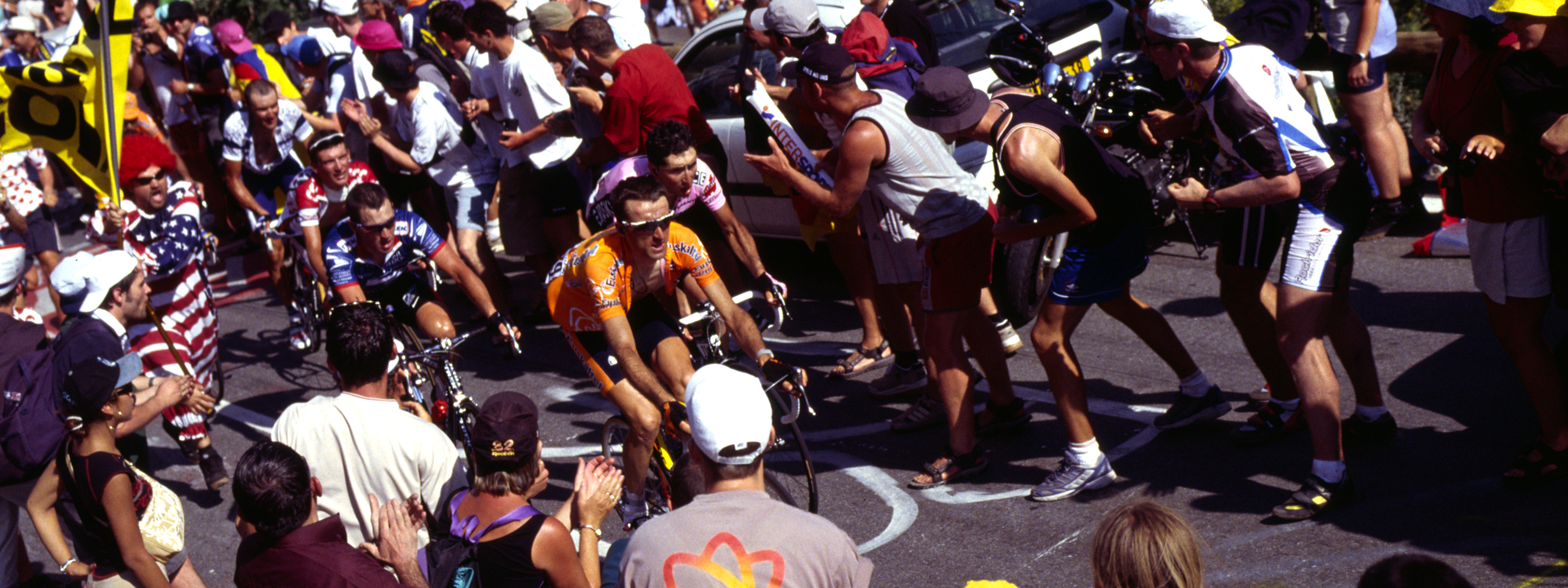
Zubeldia riding at the front of the group at the stage up to Alpe d'Huez at the 2003 Tour de France

1998
10th Overall Tour de l'Avenir
1999
6th Prueba Villafranca de Ordizia
9th Overall Vuelta a Burgos
10th Overall Volta a Catalunya
2000
1st Overall Euskal Bizikleta

1st Stage 4

2nd Overall Critérium du Dauphiné Libéré

1st Young rider classification

4th Overall Vuelta a La Rioja
9th Paris–Camembert
10th Overall Vuelta a Aragón
10th Overall Vuelta a Asturias
10th Overall Vuelta a España
2001
7th Overall Volta a Catalunya
2002
4th Overall Critérium du Dauphiné Libéré

1st Young rider classification

9th Paris–Camembert
2003
3rd Overall Vuelta a Murcia
3rd Subida a Urkiola
4th Overall Euskal Bizikleta
5th Overall Tour de France
10th LuK Challenge Chrono
2004
3rd Overall Vuelta a Asturias
5th Overall Euskal Bizikleta
7th Overall Clásica Internacional de Alcobendas
2005
7th Clásica de San Sebastián
2006
8th Overall Tour de France
8th Overall Euskal Bizikleta
10th Overall Vuelta a Castilla y León
2007
4th Overall Tour de France
8th Overall GP Internacional Paredes Rota dos Móveis
8th Gran Premio de Llodio
2008
5th Overall Critérium du Dauphiné Libéré
6th Overall Volta a Catalunya
9th Clásica de San Sebastián
10th Overall Vuelta a Mallorca

9th Trofeo Sóller

2009
1st Stage 4 (TTT) Tour de France
3rd Overall Volta a Catalunya
8th Overall Critérium du Dauphiné Libéré
2010
1st Overall Tour de l'Ain

1st Prologue

4th Overall Tour du Poitou-Charentes
4th Clásica de San Sebastián
4th Grand Prix Cycliste de Montréal
2011
7th Clásica de San Sebastián
8th Overall Vuelta a Andalucía
2012
6th Overall Tour de France
8th Overall Vuelta a Andalucía
10th Overall Critérium du Dauphiné
10th Overall Bayern Rundfahrt
2014
7th Clásica de San Sebastián
8th Overall Tour de France
2015
6th Overall Tour of California
2017
10th Overall Tour of California

=== Grand Tour general classification results timeline ===
Grand Tour	2000	2001	2002	2003	2004	2005	2006	2007	2008	2009	2010	2011	2012	2013	2014	2015	2016	2017
Giro d'Italia	—	—	—	—	—	49	—	—	—	—	—	—	—	—	—	—	—	—
Tour de France	—	73	39	5	DNF	15	8	4	44	25	—	15	6	36	8	62	24	52
Vuelta a España	10	43	11	—	40	—	34	44	—	14	—	25	—	DNF	DNF	23	19	—

Legend
—	Did not compete
DNF	Did not finish
DSQ	Disqualified
