= 2001 Vuelta a España, Stage 12 to Stage 21 =

Cycling race stages

The 2001 Vuelta a España was the 56th edition of the Vuelta a España, one of cycling's Grand Tours. The Vuelta began in Salamanca, with an individual time trial on 8 September, and Stage 12 occurred on 20 September with a stage from Ordino. The race finished in Madrid on 30 September.

== Stage 12 ==
20 September 2001 — Ordino to Estació d'Esquí d'Ordino-Alcalís, 17.1 km (10.6 mi) (ITT)

Stage 12 result

Rank	Rider	Team	Time
1	José María Jiménez (ESP)	iBanesto.com	36' 38"
2	Carlos Sastre (ESP)	ONCE–Eroski	+ 28"
3	José Luis Rubiera (ESP)	U.S. Postal Service	+ 31"
4	Aitor Garmendia (ESP)	Team Coast–Buffalo	+ 33"
5	Levi Leipheimer (USA)	U.S. Postal Service	+ 36"
6	Roberto Laiseka (ESP)	Euskaltel–Euskadi	+ 41"
7	Óscar Sevilla (ESP)	Kelme–Costa Blanca	+ 44"
8	Ángel Casero (ESP)	Festina	+ 48"
9	Julio Alberto Pérez Cuapio (MEX)	Ceramiche Panaria–Fiordo	+ 51"
10	Antonio Tauler (ESP)	Kelme–Costa Blanca	+ 55"

General classification after stage 12

Rank	Rider	Team	Time
1	Óscar Sevilla (ESP)	Kelme–Costa Blanca	37h 33' 43"
2	Ángel Casero (ESP)	Festina	+ 41"
3	Juan Miguel Mercado (ESP)	iBanesto.com	+ 2' 02"
4	Levi Leipheimer (USA)	U.S. Postal Service	+ 2' 19"
5	José María Jiménez (ESP)	iBanesto.com	+ 2' 50"
6	Roberto Heras (ESP)	U.S. Postal Service	+ 2' 55"
7	David Plaza (ESP)	Festina	+ 3' 17"
8	Santiago Botero (COL)	Kelme–Costa Blanca	+ 4' 21"
9	José Luis Rubiera (ESP)	U.S. Postal Service	+ 5' 27"
10	Iban Mayo (ESP)	Euskaltel–Euskadi	+ 5' 32"

== Stage 13 ==
21 September 2001 — Andorra to Universal Studios Port Aventura, 206 km (128 mi)

Stage 13 result

Rank	Rider	Team	Time
1	Beat Zberg (SUI)	Rabobank	4h 28' 07"
2	Richard Virenque (FRA)	Domo–Farm Frites–Latexco	s.t.
3	Igor Flores (ESP)	Euskaltel–Euskadi	s.t.
4	Rafael Díaz Justo (ESP)	ONCE–Eroski	s.t.
5	Dariusz Baranowski (POL)	iBanesto.com	s.t.
6	Roberto Sgambelluri (ITA)	Team Telekom	s.t.
7	Juan Carlos Guillamón (ESP)	Jazztel–Costa de Almería	s.t.
8	Massimo Giunti (ITA)	Cantina Tollo–Acqua & Sapone	+ 4"
9	Erik Zabel (GER)	Team Telekom	+ 35"
10	Sven Teutenberg (GER)	Festina	s.t.

General classification after stage 13

Rank	Rider	Team	Time
1	Óscar Sevilla (ESP)	Kelme–Costa Blanca	42h 02' 05"
2	Ángel Casero (ESP)	Festina	+ 41"
3	Juan Miguel Mercado (ESP)	iBanesto.com	+ 2' 02"
4	Levi Leipheimer (USA)	U.S. Postal Service	+ 2' 19"
5	José María Jiménez (ESP)	iBanesto.com	+ 2' 50"
6	Roberto Heras (ESP)	U.S. Postal Service	+ 2' 55"
7	David Plaza (ESP)	Festina	+ 3' 17"
8	Santiago Botero (COL)	Kelme–Costa Blanca	+ 4' 21"
9	José Luis Rubiera (ESP)	U.S. Postal Service	+ 5' 27"
10	Iban Mayo (ESP)	Euskaltel–Euskadi	+ 5' 32"

== Stage 14 ==
22 September 2001 — Tarragona to Vinaròs, 170.5 km (105.9 mi)

Stage 14 result

Rank	Rider	Team	Time
1	Juan Manuel Gárate (ESP)	Lampre–Daikin	3h 56' 08"
2	Juan Carlos Domínguez (ESP)	iBanesto.com	s.t.
3	Julian Dean (NZL)	U.S. Postal Service	+ 15"
4	Marc Lotz (NED)	Rabobank	+ 28"
5	Mariano Piccoli (ITA)	Lampre–Daikin	s.t.
6	Salvatore Commesso (ITA)	Saeco	s.t.
7	Tomáš Konečný (CZE)	Domo–Farm Frites–Latexco	s.t.
8	Jörg Jaksche (GER)	ONCE–Eroski	s.t.
9	Alberto Elli (ITA)	Team Telekom	s.t.
10	Jon Odriozola (ESP)	iBanesto.com	s.t.

General classification after stage 14

Rank	Rider	Team	Time
1	Óscar Sevilla (ESP)	Kelme–Costa Blanca	46h 08' 17"
2	Ángel Casero (ESP)	Festina	+ 41"
3	Juan Miguel Mercado (ESP)	iBanesto.com	+ 2' 02"
4	Levi Leipheimer (USA)	U.S. Postal Service	+ 2' 19"
5	José María Jiménez (ESP)	iBanesto.com	+ 2' 50"
6	Roberto Heras (ESP)	U.S. Postal Service	+ 2' 55"
7	David Plaza (ESP)	Festina	+ 3' 17"
8	Santiago Botero (COL)	Kelme–Costa Blanca	+ 4' 21"
9	José Luis Rubiera (ESP)	U.S. Postal Service	+ 5' 27"
10	Iban Mayo (ESP)	Euskaltel–Euskadi	+ 5' 32"

== Stage 15 ==
23 September 2001 — Valencia to Alto de Aitana, 207.2 km (128.7 mi)

Stage 15 result

Rank	Rider	Team	Time
1	Claus Michael Møller (DEN)	Milaneza–MSS	5h 44' 18"
2	Gilberto Simoni (ITA)	Lampre–Daikin	+ 15"
3	Carlos Sastre (ESP)	ONCE–Eroski	s.t.
4	Roberto Heras (ESP)	U.S. Postal Service	s.t.
5	José Luis Rubiera (ESP)	U.S. Postal Service	+ 22"
6	Ángel Casero (ESP)	Festina	+ 34"
7	Juan Miguel Mercado (ESP)	iBanesto.com	+ 50"
8	Óscar Sevilla (ESP)	Kelme–Costa Blanca	s.t.
9	Santiago Blanco (ESP)	iBanesto.com	+ 57"
10	Aitor Osa (ESP)	iBanesto.com	+ 1' 04"

General classification after stage 15

Rank	Rider	Team	Time
1	Óscar Sevilla (ESP)	Kelme–Costa Blanca	51h 53' 25"
2	Ángel Casero (ESP)	Festina	+ 25"
3	Juan Miguel Mercado (ESP)	iBanesto.com	+ 2' 02"
4	Roberto Heras (ESP)	U.S. Postal Service	+ 2' 20"
5	David Plaza (ESP)	Festina	+ 3' 31"
6	Levi Leipheimer (USA)	U.S. Postal Service	+ 3' 55"
7	José Luis Rubiera (ESP)	U.S. Postal Service	+ 4' 59"
8	Aitor Osa (ESP)	iBanesto.com	+ 5' 47"
9	Iban Mayo (ESP)	Euskaltel–Euskadi	+ 6' 59"
10	Fernando Escartín (ESP)	Team Coast–Buffalo	+ 7' 18"

== Rest day 2 ==
24 September 2001 — Province of Valencia

== Stage 16 ==
25 September 2001 — Alcoy to Murcia, 153.3 km (95.3 mi)

Stage 16 result

Rank	Rider	Team	Time
1	Tomáš Konečný (CZE)	Domo–Farm Frites–Latexco	3h 11' 33"
2	David Etxebarria (ESP)	Euskaltel–Euskadi	s.t.
3	Ángel Edo (ESP)	Milaneza–MSS	s.t.
4	Beat Zberg (SUI)	Rabobank	s.t.
5	Igor Pugaci (MDA)	Saeco	s.t.
6	Óscar Sevilla (ESP)	Kelme–Costa Blanca	s.t.
7	Giuliano Figueras (ITA)	Ceramiche Panaria–Fiordo	s.t.
8	Santiago Botero (COL)	Kelme–Costa Blanca	s.t.
9	Félix García Casas (ESP)	Festina	s.t.
10	Fernando Escartín (ESP)	Team Coast–Buffalo	s.t.

General classification after stage 16

Rank	Rider	Team	Time
1	Óscar Sevilla (ESP)	Kelme–Costa Blanca	55h 04' 58"
2	Ángel Casero (ESP)	Festina	+ 25"
3	Juan Miguel Mercado (ESP)	iBanesto.com	+ 2' 02"
4	Roberto Heras (ESP)	U.S. Postal Service	+ 2' 20"
5	David Plaza (ESP)	Festina	+ 3' 31"
6	Levi Leipheimer (USA)	U.S. Postal Service	+ 3' 55"
7	José Luis Rubiera (ESP)	U.S. Postal Service	+ 4' 59"
8	Aitor Osa (ESP)	iBanesto.com	+ 5' 47"
9	Iban Mayo (ESP)	Euskaltel–Euskadi	+ 6' 59"
10	Fernando Escartín (ESP)	Team Coast–Buffalo	+ 7' 18"

== Stage 17 ==
26 September 2001 — Murcia to Albacete, 159.5 km (99.1 mi)

Stage 17 result

Rank	Rider	Team	Time
1	Robert Hunter (RSA)	Lampre–Daikin	3h 18' 46"
2	Danilo Hondo (GER)	Team Telekom	s.t.
3	Robbie McEwen (AUS)	Domo–Farm Frites–Latexco	s.t.
4	Dmitry Fofonov (KAZ)	Cofidis	s.t.
5	Ángel Vicioso (ESP)	Kelme–Costa Blanca	s.t.
6	Igor Flores (ESP)	Euskaltel–Euskadi	s.t.
7	Cristian Moreni (ITA)	Mercatone Uno–Stream TV	s.t.
8	Eleuterio Anguita (ESP)	Jazztel–Costa de Almería	s.t.
9	Gorka Gerrikagoitia (ESP)	Euskaltel–Euskadi	s.t.
10	Pedro Horrillo (ESP)	Mapei–Quick-Step	s.t.

General classification after stage 17

Rank	Rider	Team	Time
1	Óscar Sevilla (ESP)	Kelme–Costa Blanca	58h 23' 44"
2	Ángel Casero (ESP)	Festina	+ 25"
3	Roberto Heras (ESP)	U.S. Postal Service	+ 2' 20"
4	Juan Miguel Mercado (ESP)	iBanesto.com	+ 3' 19"
5	Levi Leipheimer (USA)	U.S. Postal Service	+ 3' 55"
6	David Plaza (ESP)	Festina	+ 4' 44"
7	José Luis Rubiera (ESP)	U.S. Postal Service	+ 4' 59"
8	Aitor Osa (ESP)	iBanesto.com	+ 5' 47"
9	Iban Mayo (ESP)	Euskaltel–Euskadi	+ 6' 59"
10	Fernando Escartín (ESP)	Team Coast–Buffalo	+ 7' 18"

== Stage 18 ==
27 September 2001 — Albacete to Cuenca, 154.2 km (95.8 mi)

Stage 18 result

Rank	Rider	Team	Time
1	Filippo Simeoni (ITA)	Cantina Tollo–Acqua & Sapone	3h 07' 29"
2	Geert Verheyen (BEL)	Rabobank	+ 28"
3	Rafael Díaz Justo (ESP)	ONCE–Eroski	s.t.
4	Rui Lavarinhas (POR)	Milaneza–MSS	s.t.
5	Haimar Zubeldia (ESP)	Euskaltel–Euskadi	s.t.
6	Íñigo Cuesta (ESP)	Cofidis	s.t.
7	Sven Teutenberg (GER)	Festina	+ 59"
8	Tomáš Konečný (CZE)	Domo–Farm Frites–Latexco	s.t.
9	Erik Zabel (GER)	Team Telekom	s.t.
10	David Etxebarria (ESP)	Euskaltel–Euskadi	s.t.

General classification after stage 18

Rank	Rider	Team	Time
1	Óscar Sevilla (ESP)	Kelme–Costa Blanca	61h 32' 12"
2	Ángel Casero (ESP)	Festina	+ 25"
3	Roberto Heras (ESP)	U.S. Postal Service	+ 2' 20"
4	Juan Miguel Mercado (ESP)	iBanesto.com	+ 3' 19"
5	Levi Leipheimer (USA)	U.S. Postal Service	+ 3' 55"
6	David Plaza (ESP)	Festina	+ 4' 44"
7	José Luis Rubiera (ESP)	U.S. Postal Service	+ 4' 59"
8	Aitor Osa (ESP)	iBanesto.com	+ 5' 47"
9	Iban Mayo (ESP)	Euskaltel–Euskadi	+ 6' 59"
10	Fernando Escartín (ESP)	Team Coast–Buffalo	+ 7' 18"

== Stage 19 ==
29 September 2001 — Cuenca to Guadalajara, 168 km (104 mi)

Stage 19 result

Rank	Rider	Team	Time
1	Guido Trenti (USA)	Cantina Tollo–Acqua & Sapone	3h 49' 34"
2	Mikel Zarrabeitia (ESP)	ONCE–Eroski	+ 2"
3	Alexandr Shefer (KAZ)	Alessio	s.t.
4	José García Acosta (ESP)	iBanesto.com	+ 10"
5	Karsten Kroon (NED)	Rabobank	+ 44"
6	João Silva (POR)	Milaneza–MSS	s.t.
7	Alberto Elli (ITA)	Team Telekom	s.t.
8	Mariano Piccoli (ITA)	Lampre–Daikin	s.t.
9	Juan Carlos Vicario (ESP)	Festina	+ 46"
10	Simone Bertoletti (ITA)	Lampre–Daikin	+ 1' 41"

General classification after stage 19

Rank	Rider	Team	Time
1	Óscar Sevilla (ESP)	Kelme–Costa Blanca	65h 36' 58"
2	Ángel Casero (ESP)	Festina	+ 25"
3	Roberto Heras (ESP)	U.S. Postal Service	+ 2' 20"
4	Juan Miguel Mercado (ESP)	iBanesto.com	+ 3' 19"
5	Levi Leipheimer (USA)	U.S. Postal Service	+ 3' 55"
6	David Plaza (ESP)	Festina	+ 4' 44"
7	José Luis Rubiera (ESP)	U.S. Postal Service	+ 4' 59"
8	Aitor Osa (ESP)	iBanesto.com	+ 5' 47"
9	Iban Mayo (ESP)	Euskaltel–Euskadi	+ 6' 59"
10	Fernando Escartín (ESP)	Team Coast–Buffalo	+ 7' 18"

== Stage 20 ==
29 September 2001 — Guadalajara to Alto de Abantos, 176.3 km (109.5 mi)

Stage 20 result

Rank	Rider	Team	Time
1	Gilberto Simoni (ITA)	Lampre–Daikin	4h 25' 09"
2	José María Jiménez (ESP)	iBanesto.com	+ 2"
3	José Luis Rubiera (ESP)	U.S. Postal Service	+ 15"
4	Claus Michael Møller (DEN)	Milaneza–MSS	s.t.
5	Óscar Sevilla (ESP)	Kelme–Costa Blanca	s.t.
6	Ángel Casero (ESP)	Festina	s.t.
7	Roberto Heras (ESP)	U.S. Postal Service	s.t.
8	Levi Leipheimer (USA)	U.S. Postal Service	s.t.
9	Aitor Osa (ESP)	iBanesto.com	s.t.
10	Juan Miguel Mercado (ESP)	iBanesto.com	s.t.

General classification after stage 20

Rank	Rider	Team	Time
1	Óscar Sevilla (ESP)	Kelme–Costa Blanca	70h 02' 22"
2	Ángel Casero (ESP)	Festina	+ 25"
3	Roberto Heras (ESP)	U.S. Postal Service	+ 2' 20"
4	Juan Miguel Mercado (ESP)	iBanesto.com	+ 3' 19"
5	Levi Leipheimer (USA)	U.S. Postal Service	+ 3' 55"
6	David Plaza (ESP)	Festina	+ 4' 44"
7	José Luis Rubiera (ESP)	U.S. Postal Service	+ 4' 59"
8	Aitor Osa (ESP)	iBanesto.com	+ 5' 47"
9	Claus Michael Møller (DEN)	Milaneza–MSS	+ 7' 27"
10	Fernando Escartín (ESP)	Team Coast–Buffalo	+ 7' 38"

== Stage 21 ==
30 September 2001 — Madrid to Madrid, 38 km (24 mi) (ITT)

Stage 21 result

Rank	Rider	Team	Time
1	Santiago Botero (COL)	Kelme–Costa Blanca	45' 33"
2	Levi Leipheimer (USA)	U.S. Postal Service	+ 14"
3	David Millar (GBR)	Cofidis	+ 37"
4	Ángel Casero (ESP)	Festina	+ 45"
5	Claus Michael Møller (DEN)	Milaneza–MSS	+ 56"
6	Santos González (ESP)	ONCE–Eroski	+ 1' 23"
7	Jörg Jaksche (GER)	ONCE–Eroski	+ 1' 45"
8	Víctor Hugo Peña (COL)	U.S. Postal Service	+ 1' 46"
9	Óscar Sevilla (ESP)	Kelme–Costa Blanca	+ 1' 57"
10	Nathan O'Neill (AUS)	Ceramiche Panaria–Fiordo	+ 2' 03"

General classification after stage 21

Rank	Rider	Team	Time
1	Ángel Casero (ESP)	Festina	70h 49' 05"
2	Óscar Sevilla (ESP)	Kelme–Costa Blanca	+ 47"
3	Levi Leipheimer (USA)	U.S. Postal Service	+ 2' 59"
4	Roberto Heras (ESP)	U.S. Postal Service	+ 3' 56"
5	Juan Miguel Mercado (ESP)	iBanesto.com	+ 5' 45"
6	David Plaza (ESP)	Festina	+ 5' 53"
7	José Luis Rubiera (ESP)	U.S. Postal Service	+ 6' 57"
8	Claus Michael Møller (DEN)	Milaneza–MSS	+ 7' 13"
9	Aitor Osa (ESP)	iBanesto.com	+ 8' 32"
10	Fernando Escartín (ESP)	Team Coast–Buffalo	+ 10' 31"
