= 2001 Vuelta a España, Stage 1 to Stage 11 =

Cycling race stages

The 2001 Vuelta a España was the 56th edition of the Vuelta a España, one of cycling's Grand Tours. The Vuelta began in Salamanca, with an individual time trial on 8 September, and Stage 11 occurred on 19 September with a stage to Estació de Pal. The race finished in Madrid on 30 September.

== Stage 1 ==
8 September 2001 — Salamanca to Salamanca, 12.3 km (7.6 mi) (ITT)

Stage 1 result and general classification after stage 1

Rank	Rider	Team	Time
1	David Millar (GBR)	Cofidis	14' 56"
2	Santiago Botero (COL)	Kelme–Costa Blanca	+ 1"
3	Levi Leipheimer (USA)	U.S. Postal Service	+ 6"
4	Igor González de Galdeano (ESP)	ONCE–Eroski	+ 17"
5	Joseba Beloki (ESP)	ONCE–Eroski	+ 23"
6	David Plaza (ESP)	Festina	+ 24"
7	José Gutiérrez (ESP)	Kelme–Costa Blanca	+ 25"
8	Mikel Zarrabeitia (ESP)	ONCE–Eroski	+ 26"
9	Jörg Jaksche (GER)	ONCE–Eroski	s.t.
10	Pedro Horrillo (ESP)	Mapei–Quick-Step	+ 28"

== Stage 2 ==
9 September 2001 — Salamanca to Valladolid, 147.2 km (91.5 mi)

Stage 2 result

Rank	Rider	Team	Time
1	Erik Zabel (GER)	Team Telekom	3h 34' 28"
2	Oscar Freire (ESP)	Mapei–Quick-Step	s.t.
3	Robbie McEwen (AUS)	Domo–Farm Frites–Latexco	s.t.
4	Ángel Edo (ESP)	Milaneza–MSS	s.t.
5	David Etxebarria (ESP)	Euskaltel–Euskadi	+ 3"
6	Miguel Ángel Martín Perdiguero (ESP)	Cantina Tollo–Acqua & Sapone	s.t.
7	Pedro Horrillo (ESP)	Mapei–Quick-Step	s.t.
8	Janek Tombak (EST)	Cofidis	s.t.
9	David Millar (GBR)	Cofidis	s.t.
10	Salvatore Commesso (ITA)	Saeco	s.t.

General classification after stage 2

Rank	Rider	Team	Time
1	David Millar (GBR)	Cofidis	3h 49' 27"
2	Santiago Botero (COL)	Kelme–Costa Blanca	+ 1"
3	Levi Leipheimer (USA)	U.S. Postal Service	+ 6"
4	Igor González de Galdeano (ESP)	ONCE–Eroski	+ 17"
5	Joseba Beloki (ESP)	ONCE–Eroski	+ 23"
6	David Plaza (ESP)	Festina	+ 24"
7	José Gutiérrez (ESP)	Kelme–Costa Blanca	+ 25"
8	Mikel Zarrabeitia (ESP)	ONCE–Eroski	+ 26"
9	Jörg Jaksche (GER)	ONCE–Eroski	s.t.
10	Pedro Horrillo (ESP)	Mapei–Quick-Step	+ 28"

== Stage 3 ==
10 September 2001 — Valladolid to León, 140.5 km (87.3 mi)

Stage 3 result

Rank	Rider	Team	Time
1	Erik Zabel (GER)	Team Telekom	3h 02' 50"
2	Robbie McEwen (AUS)	Domo–Farm Frites–Latexco	s.t.
3	Danilo Hondo (GER)	Team Telekom	s.t.
4	Sven Teutenberg (GER)	Festina	s.t.
5	Luca Paolini (ITA)	Mapei–Quick-Step	s.t.
6	Pedro Horrillo (ESP)	Mapei–Quick-Step	s.t.
7	Julian Dean (NZL)	U.S. Postal Service	s.t.
8	Janek Tombak (EST)	Cofidis	s.t.
9	Lars Michaelsen (DEN)	Team Coast–Buffalo	s.t.
10	Salvatore Commesso (ITA)	Saeco	s.t.

General classification after stage 3

Rank	Rider	Team	Time
1	David Millar (GBR)	Cofidis	6h 52' 17"
2	Santiago Botero (COL)	Kelme–Costa Blanca	+ 1"
3	Igor González de Galdeano (ESP)	ONCE–Eroski	+ 17"
4	José Gutiérrez (ESP)	Kelme–Costa Blanca	+ 25"
5	Pedro Horrillo (ESP)	Mapei–Quick-Step	+ 28"
6	Ángel Vicioso (ESP)	Kelme–Costa Blanca	+ 34"
7	Óscar Sevilla (ESP)	Kelme–Costa Blanca	+ 35"
8	Robert Hunter (RSA)	Lampre–Daikin	+ 40"
9	David Cañada (ESP)	Mapei–Quick-Step	+ 43"
10	Andrea Noè (ITA)	Mapei–Quick-Step	+ 44"

== Stage 4 ==
11 September 2001 — León to Gijón, 175 km (109 mi)

Stage 4 result

Rank	Rider	Team	Time
1	Erik Zabel (GER)	Team Telekom	4h 09' 46"
2	Óscar Freire (ESP)	Mapei–Quick-Step	s.t.
3	Sven Teutenberg (GER)	Festina	s.t.
4	David Fernández (ESP)	Colchon Relax–Fuenlabrada	s.t.
5	Wilfried Cretskens (BEL)	Domo–Farm Frites–Latexco	s.t.
6	Pedro Horrillo (ESP)	Mapei–Quick-Step	s.t.
7	Luca Paolini (ITA)	Mapei–Quick-Step	s.t.
8	Janek Tombak (EST)	Cofidis	s.t.
9	Rolf Aldag (GER)	Team Telekom	s.t.
10	Alberto Elli (ITA)	Team Telekom	+ 4"

General classification after stage 4

Rank	Rider	Team	Time
1	Santiago Botero (COL)	Kelme–Costa Blanca	11h 02' 20"
2	David Millar (GBR)	Cofidis	+ 4"
3	Pedro Horrillo (ESP)	Mapei–Quick-Step	+ 11"
4	Igor González de Galdeano (ESP)	ONCE–Eroski	+ 21"
5	José Gutiérrez (ESP)	Kelme–Costa Blanca	+ 29"
6	Óscar Sevilla (ESP)	Kelme–Costa Blanca	+ 39"
7	Alberto Elli (ITA)	Team Telekom	+ 41"
8	David Cañada (ESP)	Mapei–Quick-Step	+ 47"
9	Andrea Noè (ITA)	Mapei–Quick-Step	+ 48"
10	Joseba Beloki (ESP)	ONCE–Eroski	+ 49"

== Stage 5 ==
12 September 2001 — Gijón to Lagos de Covadonga, 160.8 km (99.9 mi)

Stage 5 result

Rank	Rider	Team	Time
1	Juan Miguel Mercado (ESP)	iBanesto.com	4h 18' 37"
2	Óscar Sevilla (ESP)	Kelme–Costa Blanca	+ 33"
3	Joseba Beloki (ESP)	ONCE–Eroski	+ 58"
4	José María Jiménez (ESP)	iBanesto.com	+ 1' 17"
5	José Luis Rubiera (ESP)	U.S. Postal Service	+ 1' 21"
6	David Plaza (ESP)	Festina	s.t.
7	Manuel Beltrán (ESP)	Mapei–Quick-Step	s.t.
8	Ángel Casero (ESP)	Festina	s.t.
9	Roberto Heras (ESP)	U.S. Postal Service	s.t.
10	Fernando Escartín (ESP)	Team Coast–Buffalo	s.t.

General classification after stage 5

Rank	Rider	Team	Time
1	Óscar Sevilla (ESP)	Kelme–Costa Blanca	15h 22' 09"
2	Juan Miguel Mercado (ESP)	iBanesto.com	+ 15"
3	Joseba Beloki (ESP)	ONCE–Eroski	+ 35"
4	David Plaza (ESP)	Festina	+ 59"
5	Roberto Heras (ESP)	U.S. Postal Service	+ 1' 06"
6	Ángel Casero (ESP)	Festina	+ 1' 09"
7	José Luis Rubiera (ESP)	U.S. Postal Service	+ 1' 12"
8	Roberto Laiseka (ESP)	Euskaltel–Euskadi	s.t.
9	Iban Mayo (ESP)	Euskaltel–Euskadi	+ 1' 37"
10	Fernando Escartín (ESP)	Team Coast–Buffalo	s.t.

== Stage 6 ==
13 September 2001 — Cangas de Onís to Torrelavega, 180.6 km (112.2 mi)

Stage 6 result

Rank	Rider	Team	Time
1	David Millar (GBR)	Cofidis	4h 02' 36"
2	Santiago Botero (COL)	Kelme–Costa Blanca	s.t.
3	Erik Zabel (GER)	Team Telekom	+ 58"
4	Óscar Freire (ESP)	Mapei–Quick-Step	s.t.
5	Miguel Ángel Martín Perdiguero (ESP)	Cantina Tollo–Acqua & Sapone	s.t.
6	Ángel Edo (ESP)	Milaneza–MSS	s.t.
7	Beat Zberg (SUI)	Rabobank	s.t.
8	Ángel Vicioso (ESP)	Kelme–Costa Blanca	s.t.
9	Niki Aebersold (SUI)	Team Coast–Buffalo	s.t.
10	Giuliano Figueras (ITA)	Ceramiche Panaria–Fiordo	s.t.

General classification after stage 6

Rank	Rider	Team	Time
1	Óscar Sevilla (ESP)	Kelme–Costa Blanca	19h 25' 43"
2	Juan Miguel Mercado (ESP)	iBanesto.com	+ 15"
3	Joseba Beloki (ESP)	ONCE–Eroski	+ 35"
4	David Plaza (ESP)	Festina	+ 59"
5	Santiago Botero (COL)	Kelme–Costa Blanca	+ 1' 06"
6	Roberto Heras (ESP)	U.S. Postal Service	s.t.
7	Ángel Casero (ESP)	Festina	+ 1' 09"
8	José Luis Rubiera (ESP)	U.S. Postal Service	+ 1' 12"
9	Roberto Laiseka (ESP)	Euskaltel–Euskadi	s.t.
10	Iban Mayo (ESP)	Euskaltel–Euskadi	+ 1' 37"

== Stage 7 ==
14 September 2001 — Torrelavega to Torrelavega, 44.2 km (27.5 mi) (ITT)

Stage 7 result

Rank	Rider	Team	Time
1	Santiago Botero (COL)	Kelme–Costa Blanca	55' 09"
2	Levi Leipheimer (USA)	U.S. Postal Service	+ 29"
3	David Plaza (ESP)	Festina	+ 44"
4	Ángel Casero (ESP)	Festina	+ 1' 04"
5	Joseba Beloki (ESP)	ONCE–Eroski	+ 1' 26"
6	Óscar Sevilla (ESP)	Kelme–Costa Blanca	+ 1' 27"
7	Nathan O'Neill (AUS)	Ceramiche Panaria–Fiordo	+ 1' 46"
8	David Millar (GBR)	Cofidis	+ 1' 49"
9	Igor González de Galdeano (ESP)	ONCE–Eroski	s.t.
10	Mikel Zarrabeitia (ESP)	ONCE–Eroski	+ 2' 20"

General classification after stage 7

Rank	Rider	Team	Time
1	Santiago Botero (COL)	Kelme–Costa Blanca	20h 21' 58"
2	Óscar Sevilla (ESP)	Kelme–Costa Blanca	+ 21"
3	David Plaza (ESP)	Festina	+ 37"
4	Joseba Beloki (ESP)	ONCE–Eroski	+ 55"
5	Ángel Casero (ESP)	Festina	+ 1' 07"
6	Juan Miguel Mercado (ESP)	iBanesto.com	+ 2' 38"
7	Levi Leipheimer (USA)	U.S. Postal Service	+ 2' 42"
8	Roberto Heras (ESP)	U.S. Postal Service	+ 3' 05"
9	Igor González de Galdeano (ESP)	ONCE–Eroski	+ 3' 11"
10	José Luis Rubiera (ESP)	U.S. Postal Service	+ 3' 26"

== Stage 8 ==
15 September 2001 — Reinosa to Alto de la Cruz de la Demanda (Valdezcaray), 195 km (121 mi)

Stage 8 result

Rank	Rider	Team	Time
1	José María Jiménez (ESP)	iBanesto.com	4h 43' 02"
2	Joseba Beloki (ESP)	ONCE–Eroski	+ 23"
3	Juan Miguel Mercado (ESP)	iBanesto.com	+ 28"
4	Levi Leipheimer (USA)	U.S. Postal Service	+ 30"
5	Roberto Laiseka (ESP)	Euskaltel–Euskadi	s.t.
6	Manuel Beltrán (ESP)	Mapei–Quick-Step	+ 47"
7	Iban Mayo (ESP)	Euskaltel–Euskadi	+ 48"
8	Íñigo Cuesta (ESP)	Cofidis	+ 57"
9	Roberto Heras (ESP)	U.S. Postal Service	+ 1' 00"
10	Ángel Casero (ESP)	Festina	+ 1' 02"

General classification after stage 8

Rank	Rider	Team	Time
1	Joseba Beloki (ESP)	ONCE–Eroski	25h 06' 17"
2	Óscar Sevilla (ESP)	Kelme–Costa Blanca	+ 14"
3	Ángel Casero (ESP)	Festina	+ 51"
4	David Plaza (ESP)	Festina	+ 1' 27"
5	Santiago Botero (COL)	Kelme–Costa Blanca	+ 1' 28"
6	Levi Leipheimer (USA)	U.S. Postal Service	+ 1' 54"
7	Juan Miguel Mercado (ESP)	iBanesto.com	+ 2' 00"
8	Roberto Heras (ESP)	U.S. Postal Service	+ 2' 47"
9	Iban Mayo (ESP)	Euskaltel–Euskadi	+ 3' 14"
10	Igor González de Galdeano (ESP)	ONCE–Eroski	+ 3' 29"

== Stage 9 ==
16 September 2001 — Logroño to Zaragoza, 179.2 km (111.3 mi)

Stage 9 result

Rank	Rider	Team	Time
1	Igor González de Galdeano (ESP)	ONCE–Eroski	3h 14' 52"
2	Sven Teutenberg (GER)	Festina	s.t.
3	Biagio Conte (ITA)	Saeco	s.t.
4	Salvatore Commesso (ITA)	Saeco	s.t.
5	Danilo Hondo (GER)	Team Telekom	s.t.
6	Ángel Vicioso (ESP)	Kelme–Costa Blanca	s.t.
7	Eleuterio Anguita (ESP)	Jazztel–Costa de Almería	s.t.
8	David Millar (GBR)	Cofidis	s.t.
9	Alberto Martínez (ESP)	Euskaltel–Euskadi	s.t.
10	Alberto Vinale (ITA)	Alessio	s.t.

General classification after stage 9

Rank	Rider	Team	Time
1	Joseba Beloki (ESP)	ONCE–Eroski	28h 21' 09"
2	Óscar Sevilla (ESP)	Kelme–Costa Blanca	+ 14"
3	Ángel Casero (ESP)	Festina	+ 51"
4	Santiago Botero (COL)	Kelme–Costa Blanca	+ 1' 28"
5	Levi Leipheimer (USA)	U.S. Postal Service	+ 1' 54"
6	Juan Miguel Mercado (ESP)	iBanesto.com	+ 2' 00"
7	David Plaza (ESP)	Festina	+ 2' 10"
8	Roberto Heras (ESP)	U.S. Postal Service	+ 2' 47"
9	Iban Mayo (ESP)	Euskaltel–Euskadi	+ 3' 14"
10	Igor González de Galdeano (ESP)	ONCE–Eroski	+ 3' 29"

== Rest day 1 ==
17 September 2001 — Province of Barcelona

== Stage 10 ==
18 September 2001 — Sabadell to Supermolina, 168.4 km (104.6 mi)

Stage 10 result

Rank	Rider	Team	Time
1	Santiago Blanco (ESP)	iBanesto.com	4h 20' 23"
2	Claus Michael Møller (DEN)	Milaneza–MSS	+ 2' 57"
3	Antonio Tauler (ESP)	Kelme–Costa Blanca	+ 4' 09"
4	José María Jiménez (ESP)	iBanesto.com	+ 4' 19"
5	Unai Osa (ESP)	iBanesto.com	+ 4' 23"
6	Fernando Escartín (ESP)	Team Coast–Buffalo	s.t.
7	Óscar Sevilla (ESP)	Kelme–Costa Blanca	s.t.
8	Aitor Osa (ESP)	iBanesto.com	s.t.
9	Levi Leipheimer (USA)	U.S. Postal Service	s.t.
10	Roberto Heras (ESP)	U.S. Postal Service	s.t.

General classification after stage 10

Rank	Rider	Team	Time
1	Joseba Beloki (ESP)	ONCE–Eroski	32h 45' 55"
2	Óscar Sevilla (ESP)	Kelme–Costa Blanca	+ 14"
3	Ángel Casero (ESP)	Festina	+ 51"
4	Santiago Botero (COL)	Kelme–Costa Blanca	+ 1' 28"
5	Levi Leipheimer (USA)	U.S. Postal Service	+ 1' 54"
6	Juan Miguel Mercado (ESP)	iBanesto.com	+ 2' 00"
7	David Plaza (ESP)	Festina	+ 2' 10"
8	Roberto Heras (ESP)	U.S. Postal Service	+ 2' 47"
9	Iban Mayo (ESP)	Euskaltel–Euskadi	+ 3' 14"
10	David Millar (GBR)	Cofidis	+ 3' 58"

== Stage 11 ==
19 September 2001 — Alp to Estació de Pal, 154.2 km (95.8 mi)

Stage 11 result

Rank	Rider	Team	Time
1	José María Jiménez (ESP)	iBanesto.com	4h 08' 28"
2	Fernando Escartín (ESP)	Team Coast–Buffalo	+ 1' 44"
3	Juan Miguel Mercado (ESP)	iBanesto.com	s.t.
4	Roberto Heras (ESP)	U.S. Postal Service	s.t.
5	Aitor Osa (ESP)	iBanesto.com	s.t.
6	Óscar Sevilla (ESP)	Kelme–Costa Blanca	s.t.
7	Ángel Casero (ESP)	Festina	s.t.
8	Claus Michael Møller (DEN)	Milaneza–MSS	+ 1' 49"
9	Íñigo Cuesta (ESP)	Cofidis	+ 2' 10"
10	José Luis Rubiera (ESP)	U.S. Postal Service	+ 2' 31"

General classification after stage 11

Rank	Rider	Team	Time
1	Óscar Sevilla (ESP)	Kelme–Costa Blanca	36h 56' 21"
2	Ángel Casero (ESP)	Festina	+ 37"
3	Juan Miguel Mercado (ESP)	iBanesto.com	+ 1' 46"
4	Levi Leipheimer (USA)	U.S. Postal Service	+ 2' 27"
5	Roberto Heras (ESP)	U.S. Postal Service	+ 2' 33"
6	David Plaza (ESP)	Festina	+ 3' 00"
7	Santiago Botero (COL)	Kelme–Costa Blanca	+ 3' 06"
8	José María Jiménez (ESP)	iBanesto.com	+ 3' 34"
9	Iban Mayo (ESP)	Euskaltel–Euskadi	+ 4' 04"
10	Aitor Osa (ESP)	iBanesto.com	+ 4' 32"
