= List of teams and cyclists in the 2003 Tour de France =

List of cyclists

The 2003 Tour de France was the 90th edition and centenary of the Tour de France, one of cycling's Grand Tours. The Tour began in Paris on 5 July with a prologue individual time trial and finished on the Champs-Élysées, back in Paris, on 27 July. The Tour started with 22 teams of 9 cyclists each.

== Teams ==
Qualified teams

- U.S. Postal Service
- ONCE–Eroski
- Team Telekom
- iBanesto.com
- Rabobank
- Cofidis
- Team CSC
- Fassa Bortolo
- Kelme–Costa Blanca
- Team Bianchi
- Lotto–Domo
- Gerolsteiner
- Alessio
- Vini Caldirola–So.di

Invited teams

- Saeco
- FDJeux.com
- Quick-Step–Davitamon
- Crédit Agricole
- AG2R Prévoyance
- Euskaltel–Euskadi
- Brioches La Boulangère
- Jean Delatour

== Cyclists ==
=== By starting number ===
Legend
No.	Starting number worn by the rider during the Tour
Pos.	Position in the general classification
DNF	Denotes a rider who did not finish

No.	Name	Nationality	Team	Pos.	Ref
1	~~Lance Armstrong~~	United States	U.S. Postal Service	~~1~~	
2	Roberto Heras	Spain	U.S. Postal Service	34	
3	Manuel Beltrán	Spain	U.S. Postal Service	14	
4	Viatcheslav Ekimov	Russia	U.S. Postal Service	76	
5	George Hincapie	United States	U.S. Postal Service	47	
6	Floyd Landis	United States	U.S. Postal Service	77	
7	Pavel Padrnos	Czech Republic	U.S. Postal Service	102	
8	Víctor Hugo Peña	Colombia	U.S. Postal Service	88	
9	José Luis Rubiera	Spain	U.S. Postal Service	19	
11	Joseba Beloki	Spain	ONCE–Eroski	DNF	
12	René Andrle	Czech Republic	ONCE–Eroski	83	
13	José Azevedo	Portugal	ONCE–Eroski	26	
14	Alvaro González de Galdeano	Spain	ONCE–Eroski	122	
15	Jörg Jaksche	Germany	ONCE–Eroski	17	
16	Isidro Nozal	Spain	ONCE–Eroski	72	
17	Mikel Pradera	Spain	ONCE–Eroski	58	
18	Marcos Serrano	Spain	ONCE–Eroski	68	
19	Ángel Vicioso	Spain	ONCE–Eroski	DNF	
21	Santiago Botero	Colombia	Team Telekom	DNF	
22	Mario Aerts	Belgium	Team Telekom	89	
23	Rolf Aldag	Germany	Team Telekom	94	
24	Giuseppe Guerini	Italy	Team Telekom	35	
25	Matthias Kessler	Germany	Team Telekom	49	
26	Andreas Klöden	Germany	Team Telekom	DNF	
27	Daniele Nardello	Italy	Team Telekom	25	
28	Aleksandr Vinokurov	Kazakhstan	Team Telekom	3	
29	Erik Zabel	Germany	Team Telekom	107	
31	Francisco Mancebo	Spain	iBanesto.com	10	
32	Juan Antonio Flecha	Spain	iBanesto.com	104	
33	José Vicente Garcia Acosta	Spain	iBanesto.com	125	
34	Vladimir Karpets	Russia	iBanesto.com	100	
35	Pablo Lastras	Spain	iBanesto.com	67	
36	Denis Mensjov	Russia	iBanesto.com	11	
37	Juan Miguel Mercado	Spain	iBanesto.com	36	
38	Jevgenij Petrov	Russia	iBanesto.com	53	
39	Xabier Zandio	Spain	iBanesto.com	51	
41	Levi Leipheimer	United States	Rabobank	DNF	
42	Michael Boogerd	Netherlands	Rabobank	32	
43	Bram de Groot	Netherlands	Rabobank	99	
44	Óscar Freire	Spain	Rabobank	96	
45	Robert Hunter	South Africa	Rabobank	DNF	
46	Marc Lotz	Netherlands	Rabobank	DNF	
47	Grischa Niermann	Germany	Rabobank	28	
48	Marc Wauters	Belgium	Rabobank	115	
49	Remmert Wielinga	Netherlands	Rabobank	DNF	
51	Gilberto Simoni	Italy	Saeco	84	
52	Leonardo Bertagnolli	Italy	Saeco	DNF	
53	Salvatore Commesso	Italy	Saeco	81	
54	Danilo Di Luca	Italy	Saeco	DNF	
55	Paolo Fornaciari	Italy	Saeco	112	
56	Gerrit Glomser	Austria	Saeco	64	
57	Jörg Ludewig	Germany	Saeco	38	
58	Fabio Sacchi	Italy	Saeco	60	
59	Stefano Zanini	Italy	Saeco	DNF	
61	David Millar	Great Britain	Cofidis	55	
62	Médéric Clain	France	Cofidis	105	
63	Íñigo Cuesta	Spain	Cofidis	127	
64	Philippe Gaumont	France	Cofidis	124	
65	Massimiliano Lelli	Italy	Cofidis	15	
66	David Moncoutié	France	Cofidis	43	
67	Luis Pérez Rodriguez	Spain	Cofidis	DNF	
68	Guido Trentin	Italy	Cofidis	63	
69	Cédric Vasseur	France	Cofidis	97	
71	Tyler Hamilton	United States	Team CSC	4	
72	Michael Blaudzun	Denmark	Team CSC	45	
73	Nicolas Jalabert	France	Team CSC	106	
74	Bekim Christensen	Denmark	Team CSC	120	
75	Andrea Peron	Italy	Team CSC	54	
76	Peter Lüttenberger	Austria	Team CSC	13	
77	Jakob Piil	Denmark	Team CSC	113	
78	Carlos Sastre	Spain	Team CSC	9	
79	Nicki Sørensen	Denmark	Team CSC	44	
81	Ivan Basso	Italy	Fassa Bortolo	7	
82	Marzio Bruseghin	Italy	Fassa Bortolo	66	
83	Dario David Cioni	Italy	Fassa Bortolo	79	
84	Aitor González	Spain	Fassa Bortolo	DNF	
85	Volodymyr Hustov	Ukraine	Fassa Bortolo	DNF	
86	Nicola Loda	Italy	Fassa Bortolo	DNF	
87	Sven Montgomery	Switzerland	Fassa Bortolo	DNF	
88	Alessandro Petacchi	Italy	Fassa Bortolo	DNF	
89	Marco Velo	Italy	Fassa Bortolo	DNF	
91	Sandy Casar	France	FDJeux.com	111	
92	Jimmy Casper	France	FDJeux.com	DNF	
93	Baden Cooke	Australia	FDJeux.com	140	
94	Carlos Da Cruz	France	FDJeux.com	93	
95	Nicolas Fritsch	Austria	FDJeux.com	78	
96	Bradley McGee	Australia	FDJeux.com	133	
97	Christophe Mengin	France	FDJeux.com	110	
98	Nicolas Vogondy	France	FDJeux.com	117	
99	Matthew Wilson	Australia	FDJeux.com	DNF	
101	José Ignacio Gutiérrez	Spain	Kelme–Costa Blanca	DNF	
102	José Enrique Gutiérrez	Spain	Kelme–Costa Blanca	41	
103	David Latasa	Spain	Kelme–Costa Blanca	73	
104	Jesús Manzano	Spain	Kelme–Costa Blanca	DNF	
105	David Muñoz	Spain	Kelme–Costa Blanca	139	
106	Iván Parra	Colombia	Kelme–Costa Blanca	46	
107	Javier Pascual Llorente	Spain	Kelme–Costa Blanca	27	
108	Antonio Tauler	Spain	Kelme–Costa Blanca	DNF	
109	Julian Usano	Spain	Kelme–Costa Blanca	142	
111	Paolo Bettini	Italy	Quick-Step–Davitamon	48	
112	László Bodrogi	Hungary	Quick-Step–Davitamon	108	
113	Davide Bramati	Italy	Quick-Step–Davitamon	126	
114	David Cañada	Spain	Quick-Step–Davitamon	56	
115	Servais Knaven	Netherlands	Quick-Step–Davitamon	123	
116	Luca Paolini	Italy	Quick-Step–Davitamon	69	
117	Michael Rogers	Australia	Quick-Step–Davitamon	42	
118	Kurt Van De Wouwer	Belgium	Quick-Step–Davitamon	62	
119	Richard Virenque	France	Quick-Step–Davitamon	16	
121	Christophe Moreau	France	Crédit Agricole	8	
122	Stéphane Augé	France	Crédit Agricole	DNF	
123	Pierrick Fédrigo	France	Crédit Agricole	DNF	
124	Sébastien Hinault	France	Crédit Agricole	138	
125	Thor Hushovd	Norway	Crédit Agricole	118	
126	Lilian Jégou	France	Crédit Agricole	DNF	
127	Stuart O'Grady	Australia	Crédit Agricole	90	
128	Benoît Poilvet	France	Crédit Agricole	109	
129	Jens Voigt	Germany	Crédit Agricole	DNF	
131	Jan Ullrich	Germany	Team Bianchi	2	
132	Daniel Becke	Germany	Team Bianchi	145	
133	Ángel Casero	Spain	Team Bianchi	57	
134	Félix Garcia Casas	Spain	Team Bianchi	23	
135	Aitor Garmendia	Spain	Team Bianchi	70	
136	Fabrizio Guidi	Italy	Team Bianchi	103	
137	Thomas Liese	Germany	Team Bianchi	136	
138	David Plaza	Spain	Team Bianchi	22	
139	Tobias Steinhauser	Germany	Team Bianchi	DNF	
141	Robbie McEwen	Australia	Lotto–Domo	143	
142	Serge Baguet	Belgium	Lotto–Domo	86	
143	Christophe Brandt	Belgium	Lotto–Domo	52	
144	Hans De Clercq	Belgium	Lotto–Domo	147	
145	Nick Gates	Australia	Lotto–Domo	DNF	
146	Axel Merckx	Belgium	Lotto–Domo	DNF	
147	Koos Moerenhout	Netherlands	Lotto–Domo	128	
148	Léon van Bon	Netherlands	Lotto–Domo	132	
149	Rik Verbrugghe	Belgium	Lotto–Domo	DNF	
151	Laurent Brochard	France	AG2R Prévoyance	33	
152	Mikel Astarloza	Spain	AG2R Prévoyance	29	
153	Aleksandr Botsjarov	Russia	AG2R Prévoyance	24	
154	Íñigo Chaurreau	Spain	AG2R Prévoyance	30	
155	Andy Flickinger	France	AG2R Prévoyance	39	
156	Jaan Kirsipuu	Estonia	AG2R Prévoyance	DNF	
157	Christophe Oriol	France	AG2R Prévoyance	121	
158	Nicolas Portal	France	AG2R Prévoyance	82	
159	Ludovic Turpin	France	AG2R Prévoyance	91	
161	Stefano Garzelli	Italy	Vini Caldirola–So.Di	DNF	
162	Dario Andriotto	Italy	Vini Caldirola–So.Di	144	
163	Paolo Bossoni	Italy	Vini Caldirola–So.Di	134	
164	Andrej Hauptman	Slovenia	Vini Caldirola–So.Di	DNF	
165	Eddy Mazzoleni	Italy	Vini Caldirola–So.Di	DNF	
166	Marco Milesi	Italy	Vini Caldirola–So.Di	DNF	
167	Fred Rodriguez	United States	Vini Caldirola–So.Di	DNF	
168	Romāns Vainšteins	Latvia	Vini Caldirola–So.Di	116	
169	Steve Zampieri	Switzerland	Vini Caldirola–So.Di	87	
171	Iban Mayo	Spain	Euskaltel–Euskadi	6	
172	Mikel Artetxe	Spain	Euskaltel–Euskadi	80	
173	David Etxebarria	Spain	Euskaltel–Euskadi	DNF	
174	Unai Etxebarria	Venezuela	Euskaltel–Euskadi	DNF	
175	Roberto Laiseka	Spain	Euskaltel–Euskadi	18	
176	Iñigo Landaluze	Spain	Euskaltel–Euskadi	101	
177	Alberto López Munain	Spain	Euskaltel–Euskadi	98	
178	Samuel Sánchez	Spain	Euskaltel–Euskadi	DNF	
179	Haimar Zubeldia	Spain	Euskaltel–Euskadi	5	
181	Didier Rous	France	Brioches La Boulangère	20	
182	Walter Bénéteau	France	Brioches La Boulangère	59	
183	Sylvain Chavanel	France	Brioches La Boulangère	37	
184	Anthony Geslin	France	Brioches La Boulangère	114	
185	Maryan Hary	France	Brioches La Boulangère	130	
186	Damien Nazon	France	Brioches La Boulangère	129	
187	Jérôme Pineau	France	Brioches La Boulangère	71	
188	Franck Rénier	France	Brioches La Boulangère	95	
189	Thomas Voeckler	France	Brioches La Boulangère	119	
191	Davide Rebellin	Italy	Gerolsteiner	DNF	
192	Udo Bölts	Germany	Gerolsteiner	61	
193	René Haselbacher	Austria	Gerolsteiner	DNF	
194	Uwe Peschel	Germany	Gerolsteiner	DNF	
195	Olaf Pollack	Germany	Gerolsteiner	DNF	
196	Michael Rich	Germany	Gerolsteiner	DNF	
197	Torsten Schmidt	Germany	Gerolsteiner	DNF	
198	Georg Totschnig	Austria	Gerolsteiner	12	
199	Markus Zberg	Switzerland	Gerolsteiner	92	
201	Laurent Dufaux	Switzerland	Alessio	21	
202	Fabio Baldato	Italy	Alessio	DNF	
203	Alessandro Bertolini	Italy	Alessio	146	
204	Pietro Caucchioli	Italy	Alessio	DNF	
205	Raffaele Ferrara	Italy	Alessio	DNF	
206	Angelo Furlan	Italy	Alessio	DNF	
207	Vladimir Miholjević	Croatia	Alessio	50	
208	Andrea Noè	Italy	Alessio	74	
209	Franco Pellizotti	Italy	Alessio	75	
211	Patrice Halgand	France	Jean Delatour	40	
212	Pierre Bourquenoud	Switzerland	Jean Delatour	DNF	
213	Samuel Dumoulin	France	Jean Delatour	141	
214	Christophe Edaleine	France	Jean Delatour	131	
215	Frédéric Finot	France	Jean Delatour	137	
216	Stéphane Goubert	France	Jean Delatour	31	
217	Jurij Krivtsov	Ukraine	Jean Delatour	85	
218	Laurent Lefèvre	France	Jean Delatour	65	
219	Jean-Patrick Nazon	France	Jean Delatour	135	

=== By team ===
"DNF" indicates that a rider did not finish the race.

U.S. Postal Service
No.	Rider	Pos.
1	~~Lance Armstrong (USA)~~	~~1~~
2	Roberto Heras (ESP)	34
3	Manuel Beltrán (ESP)	14
4	Viatcheslav Ekimov (RUS)	76
5	George Hincapie (USA)	47
6	Floyd Landis (USA)	77
7	Pavel Padrnos (CZE)	102
8	Víctor Hugo Peña (COL)	88
9	José Luis Rubiera (ESP)	19
Directeur sportif: Johan Bruyneel

ONCE–Eroski
No.	Rider	Pos.
11	Joseba Beloki (ESP)	DNF
12	René Andrle (CZE)	83
13	José Azevedo (POR)	26
14	Álvaro González de Galdeano (ESP)	122
15	Jörg Jaksche (GER)	17
16	Isidro Nozal (ESP)	72
17	Mikel Pradera (ESP)	58
18	Marcos Serrano (ESP)	68
19	Ángel Vicioso (ESP)	DNF
Directeur sportif: Manolo Saiz

Team Telekom
No.	Rider	Pos.
21	Santiago Botero (COL)	DNF
22	Mario Aerts (BEL)	89
23	Rolf Aldag (GER)	94
24	Giuseppe Guerini (ITA)	35
25	Matthias Kessler (GER)	49
26	Andreas Klöden (GER)	DNF
27	Daniele Nardello (ITA)	25
28	Aleksandr Vinokurov (KAZ)	3
29	Erik Zabel (GER)	107
Directeur sportif: Walter Godefroot

iBanesto.com
No.	Rider	Pos.
31	Francisco Mancebo (ESP)	10
32	Juan Antonio Flecha (ESP)	104
33	José Vicente Garcia Acosta (ESP)	125
34	Vladimir Karpets (RUS)	100
35	Pablo Lastras (ESP)	67
36	Denis Mensjov (RUS)	11
37	Juan Miguel Mercado (ESP)	36
38	Jevgenij Petrov (RUS)	53
39	Xabier Zandio (ESP)	51
Directeur sportif: José Miguel Echavarri

Rabobank
No.	Rider	Pos.
41	Levi Leipheimer (USA)	DNF
42	Michael Boogerd (NED)	32
43	Bram de Groot (NED)	99
44	Óscar Freire (ESP)	96
45	Robert Hunter (RSA)	DNF
46	Marc Lotz (NED)	DNF
47	Grischa Niermann (GER)	28
48	Marc Wauters (BEL)	115
49	Remmert Wielinga (NED)	DNF
Directeur sportif: Jan Raas

Saeco
No.	Rider	Pos.
51	Gilberto Simoni (ITA)	84
52	Leonardo Bertagnolli (ITA)	DNF
53	Salvatore Commesso (ITA)	81
54	Danilo Di Luca (ITA)	DNF
55	Paolo Fornaciari (ITA)	112
56	Gerrit Glomser (AUT)	64
57	Jörg Ludewig (GER)	38
58	Fabio Sacchi (ITA)	60
59	Stefano Zanini (ITA)	DNF
Directeur sportif: Claudio Corti

Cofidis
No.	Rider	Pos.
61	David Millar (GBR)	55
62	Médéric Clain (FRA)	105
63	Íñigo Cuesta (ESP)	127
64	Philippe Gaumont (FRA)	124
65	Massimiliano Lelli (ITA)	15
66	David Moncoutié (FRA)	43
67	Luis Pérez Rodriguez (ESP)	DNF
68	Guido Trentin (ITA)	63
69	Cédric Vasseur (FRA)	97
Directeur sportif: Francis van Londersele

Team CSC
No.	Rider	Pos.
71	Tyler Hamilton (USA)	4
72	Michael Blaudzun (DEN)	45
73	Nicolas Jalabert (FRA)	106
74	Bekim Christensen (DEN)	120
75	Andrea Peron (ITA)	54
76	Peter Luttenberger (AUT)	13
77	Jakob Piil (DEN)	113
78	Carlos Sastre (ESP)	9
79	Nicki Sørensen (DEN)	44
Directeur sportif: Bjarne Riis

Fassa Bortolo
No.	Rider	Pos.
81	Ivan Basso (ITA)	7
82	Marzio Bruseghin (ITA)	66
83	Dario David Cioni (ITA)	79
84	Aitor González (ESP)	DNF
85	Volodymyr Hustov (UKR)	DNF
86	Nicola Loda (ITA)	DNF
87	Sven Montgomery (SUI)	DNF
88	Alessandro Petacchi (ITA)	DNF
89	Marco Velo (ITA)	DNF
Directeur sportif: Roberto Damiani

FDJeux.com
No.	Rider	Pos.
91	Sandy Casar (FRA)	111
92	Jimmy Casper (FRA)	DNF
93	Baden Cooke (AUS)	140
94	Carlos Da Cruz (FRA)	93
95	Nicolas Fritsch (FRA)	78
96	Bradley McGee (AUS)	133
97	Christophe Mengin (FRA)	110
98	Nicolas Vogondy (FRA)	117
99	Matthew Wilson (AUS)	DNF
Directeur sportif: Marc Madiot

Kelme–Costa Blanca
No.	Rider	Pos.
101	José Ignacio Gutiérrez (ESP)	DNF
102	José Enrique Gutiérrez (ESP)	41
103	David Latasa (ESP)	73
104	Jesús Manzano (ESP)	DNF
105	David Muñoz (ESP)	139
106	Iván Parra (COL)	46
107	Javier Pascual Llorente (ESP)	27
108	Antonio Tauler (ESP)	DNF
109	Julian Usano (ESP)	142
Directeur sportif: Vicente Belda

Quick-Step–Davitamon
No.	Rider	Pos.
111	Paolo Bettini (ITA)	48
112	László Bodrogi (HUN)	108
113	Davide Bramati (ITA)	126
114	David Cañada (ESP)	56
115	Servais Knaven (NED)	123
116	Luca Paolini (ITA)	69
117	Michael Rogers (AUS)	42
118	Kurt Van De Wouwer (BEL)	62
119	Richard Virenque (FRA)	16
Directeur sportif: Wilfried Peeters

Crédit Agricole
No.	Rider	Pos.
121	Christophe Moreau (FRA)	8
122	Stéphane Augé (FRA)	DNF
123	Pierrick Fédrigo (FRA)	DNF
124	Sébastien Hinault (FRA)	138
125	Thor Hushovd (NOR)	118
126	Lilian Jégou (FRA)	DNF
127	Stuart O'Grady (AUS)	90
128	Benoît Poilvet (FRA)	109
129	Jens Voigt (GER)	DNF
Directeur sportif: Roger Legeay

Team Bianchi
No.	Rider	Pos.
131	Jan Ullrich (GER)	2
132	Daniel Becke (GER)	145
133	Ángel Casero (ESP)	57
134	Félix Garcia Casas (ESP)	23
135	Aitor Garmendia (ESP)	70
136	Fabrizio Guidi (ITA)	103
137	Thomas Liese (GER)	136
138	David Plaza (ESP)	22
139	Tobias Steinhauser (GER)	DNF
Directeur sportif: Rudy Pevenage

Lotto–Domo
No.	Rider	Pos.
141	Robbie McEwen (AUS)	143
142	Serge Baguet (BEL)	86
143	Christophe Brandt (BEL)	52
144	Hans De Clercq (BEL)	147
145	Nick Gates (AUS)	DNF
146	Axel Merckx (BEL)	DNF
147	Koos Moerenhout (NED)	128
148	Léon van Bon (NED)	132
149	Rik Verbrugghe (BEL)	DNF
Directeur sportif: Marc Sergeant

AG2R Prévoyance
No.	Rider	Pos.
151	Laurent Brochard (FRA)	33
152	Mikel Astarloza (ESP)	29
153	Aleksandr Botsjarov (RUS)	24
154	Íñigo Chaurreau (ESP)	30
155	Andy Flickinger (FRA)	39
156	Jaan Kirsipuu (EST)	DNF
157	Christophe Oriol (FRA)	121
158	Nicolas Portal (FRA)	82
159	Ludovic Turpin (FRA)	91
Directeur sportif: Laurent Biondi

Vini Caldirola–So.Di
No.	Rider	Pos.
161	Stefano Garzelli (ITA)	DNF
162	Dario Andriotto (ITA)	114
163	Paolo Bossoni (ITA)	134
164	Andrej Hauptman (SLO)	DNF
165	Eddy Mazzoleni (ITA)	DNF
166	Marco Milesi (ITA)	DNF
167	Fred Rodriguez (USA)	DNF
168	Romāns Vainšteins (LAT)	116
169	Steve Zampieri (SUI)	87
Directeur sportif: Franco Gini

Euskaltel–Euskadi
No.	Rider	Pos.
171	Iban Mayo (ESP)	6
172	Mikel Artetxe (ESP)	80
173	David Etxebarria (ESP)	DNF
174	Unai Etxebarria (VEN)	DNF
175	Roberto Laiseka (ESP)	18
176	Iñigo Landaluze (ESP)	101
177	Alberto López Munain (ESP)	98
178	Samuel Sánchez (ESP)	DNF
179	Haimar Zubeldia (ESP)	5
Directeur sportif: Julián Gorospe

Brioches La Boulangère
No.	Rider	Pos.
181	Didier Rous (FRA)	20
182	Walter Bénéteau (FRA)	59
183	Sylvain Chavanel (FRA)	37
184	Anthony Geslin (FRA)	114
185	Maryan Hary (FRA)	130
186	Damien Nazon (FRA)	129
187	Jérôme Pineau (FRA)	71
188	Franck Rénier (FRA)	95
189	Thomas Voeckler (FRA)	119
Directeur sportif: Jean-René Bernaudeau

Gerolsteiner
No.	Rider	Pos.
191	Davide Rebellin (ITA)	DNF
192	Udo Bölts (GER)	61
193	René Haselbacher (AUT)	DNF
194	Uwe Peschel (GER)	DNF
195	Olaf Pollack (GER)	DNF
196	Michael Rich (GER)	DNF
197	Torsten Schmidt (GER)	DNF
198	Georg Totschnig (AUT)	12
199	Markus Zberg (SUI)	92
Directeur sportif: Hans-Michael Holczer

Alessio
No.	Rider	Pos.
201	Laurent Dufaux (SUI)	21
202	Fabio Baldato (ITA)	DNF
203	Alessandro Bertolini (ITA)	146
204	Pietro Caucchioli (ITA)	DNF
205	Raffaele Ferrara (ITA)	DNF
206	Angelo Furlan (ITA)	DNF
207	Vladimir Miholjević (CRO)	50
208	Andrea Noè (ITA)	74
209	Franco Pellizotti (ITA)	75
Directeur sportif: Dario Mariuzzo

Jean Delatour
No.	Rider	Pos.
211	Patrice Halgand (FRA)	40
212	Pierre Bourquenoud (SUI)	DNF
213	Samuel Dumoulin (FRA)	141
214	Christophe Edaleine (FRA)	131
215	Frédéric Finot (FRA)	137
216	Stéphane Goubert (FRA)	31
217	Jurij Krivtsov (UKR)	85
218	Laurent Lefèvre (FRA)	65
219	Jean-Patrick Nazon (FRA)	135
Directeur sportif: Patrick Perret

=== By nationality ===
The 198 riders that are competing in the 2003 Tour de France originated from 26 different countries.

Country	No. of riders	Finishers	Stage wins
Australia	7	5	2 (Bradley McGee, Baden Cooke)
Austria	4	4	0
Belgium	8	6	0
Colombia	3	2	0
Croatia	1	1	0
Czech Republic	2	2	0
Denmark	4	4	1 (Jakob Piil)
Estonia	1	0	0
France	38	34	2 (Richard Virenque, Jean-Patrick Nazon)
Germany	18	10	1 (Jan Ullrich)
Great Britain	1	1	1 (David Millar)
Hungary	1	1	0
Italy	35	21	5 (Alessandro Petacchi ×4, Gilberto Simoni ×1)
Kazakhstan	1	1	1 (Alexander Vinokourov)
Latvia	1	1	0
Netherlands	7	5	1 (Servais Knaven)
Norway	1	1	0
Portugal	1	1	0
Russia	5	5	0
Slovenia	1	0	0
South Africa	1	0	0
Spain	43	34	4 (Iban Mayo, Juan Antonio Flecha, Carlos Sastre, Pablo Lastras)
Switzerland	5	3	0
Ukraine	2	1	0
United States	6	4	~~2~~ ~~(Lance Armstrong~~, Tyler Hamilton)
Venezuela	1	0	0
Total	198	147	19
