= List of teams and cyclists in the 1998 Vuelta a España =

For the 1998 Vuelta a España, the field consisted of 198 riders; 108 finished the race.

== By rider ==
Legend
No.	Starting number worn by the rider during the Vuelta
Pos.	Position in the general classification
Time	Deficit to the winner of the general classification
DNF	Denotes a rider who did not finish

No.	Name	Nationality	Team	Pos.	Time	Ref
1	Alex Zülle	Switzerland	Festina–Lotus	8	+ 6' 05"	
2	Laurent Brochard	France	Festina–Lotus	33	+ 57' 56"	
3	Laurent Dufaux	Switzerland	Festina–Lotus	DNF	—	
4	Félix García Casas	Spain	Festina–Lotus	20	+ 31' 58"	
5	Pascal Hervé	France	Festina–Lotus	DNF	—	
6	Didier Rous	France	Festina–Lotus	DNF	—	
7	José Ramón Uriarte	Spain	Festina–Lotus	29	+ 54' 09"	
8	Richard Virenque	France	Festina–Lotus	11	+ 13' 33"	
9	Marcel Wüst	Germany	Festina–Lotus	106	+ 3h 45' 21"	
11	José Castelblanco	Colombia	Avianca–Telecom	15	+ 21' 28"	
12	Julio César Aguirre	Colombia	Avianca–Telecom	45	+ 1h 18' 41"	
13	Jairo Hernández	Colombia	Avianca–Telecom	DNF	—	
14	Francisco León Mane	Spain	Avianca–Telecom	98	+ 3h 11' 36"	
15	Javier Pascual Llorente	Spain	Avianca–Telecom	38	+ 1h 08' 38"	
16	Luis Ricardo Mesa	Colombia	Avianca–Telecom	DNF	—	
17	Federico Muñoz	Colombia	Avianca–Telecom	44	+ 1h 16' 09"	
18	Carlos Osorio	Colombia	Avianca–Telecom	DNF	—	
19	Víctor Hugo Peña	Colombia	Avianca–Telecom	DNF	—	
21	Abraham Olano	Spain	Banesto	1	93h 44' 08"	
22	Manuel Beltrán	Spain	Banesto	13	+ 16' 42"	
23	Armand de Las Cuevas	France	Banesto	DNF	—	
24	Manuel Fernández Ginés	Spain	Banesto	69	+ 2h 11' 50"	
25	José Vicente García	Spain	Banesto	48	+ 1h 27' 08"	
26	Aitor Garmendia	Spain	Banesto	DNF	—	
27	José María Jiménez	Spain	Banesto	3	+ 2' 12"	
28	Jon Odriozola	Spain	Banesto	12	+ 14' 05"	
29	Aitor Osa	Spain	Banesto	22	+ 36' 39"	
31	Daniele Contrini	Italy	Brescialat–Liquigas	DNF	—	
32	Cristiano Frattini	Italy	Brescialat–Liquigas	68	+ 2h 10' 58"	
33	Ruslan Ivanov	Moldova	Brescialat–Liquigas	99	+ 3h 12' 32"	
34	Marco Milesi	Italy	Brescialat–Liquigas	DNF	—	
35	Mariano Piccoli	Italy	Brescialat–Liquigas	77	+ 2h 32' 49"	
36	Giancarlo Raimondi	Italy	Brescialat–Liquigas	96	+ 3h 09' 44"	
37	Marco Serpellini	Italy	Brescialat–Liquigas	9	+ 8' 58"	
38	Roberto Sgambelluri	Italy	Brescialat–Liquigas	37	+ 1h 03' 53"	
39	Cristian Moreni	Italy	Brescialat–Liquigas	DNF	—	
41	Serhiy Honchar	Ukraine	Cantina Tollo–Alexia Alluminio	DNF	—	
42	Maurizio Frizzo	Italy	Cantina Tollo–Alexia Alluminio	78	+ 2h 32' 51"	
43	Massimiliano Gentili	Italy	Cantina Tollo–Alexia Alluminio	DNF	—	
44	Massimo Giunti	Italy	Cantina Tollo–Alexia Alluminio	DNF	—	
45	Martin Hvastija	Slovenia	Cantina Tollo–Alexia Alluminio	DNF	—	
46	Martin Rittsel	Sweden	Cantina Tollo–Alexia Alluminio	DNF	—	
47	Gilberto Simoni	Italy	Cantina Tollo–Alexia Alluminio	19	+ 30' 32"	
48	Massimo Strazzer	Italy	Cantina Tollo–Alexia Alluminio	DNF	—	
49	Guido Trenti	United States	Cantina Tollo–Alexia Alluminio	105	+ 3h 42' 27"	
51	Christophe Agnolutto	France	Casino–Ag2r	101	+ 3h 30' 43"	
52	Lauri Aus	Estonia	Casino–Ag2r	DNF	—	
53	Frédéric Bessy	France	Casino–Ag2r	43	+ 1h 15' 04"	
54	Vincent Cali	France	Casino–Ag2r	51	+ 1h 33' 45"	
55	Pascal Chanteur	France	Casino–Ag2r	47	+ 1h 19' 03"	
56	Fabrice Gougot	France	Casino–Ag2r	18	+ 30' 05"	
57	Artūras Kasputis	Lithuania	Casino–Ag2r	DNF	—	
58	Jaan Kirsipuu	Estonia	Casino–Ag2r	DNF	—	
59	Rodolfo Massi	Italy	Casino–Ag2r	DNF	—	
61	Alessandro Bertolini	Italy	Cofidis	83	+ 2h 45' 09"	
62	Christophe Capelle	France	Cofidis	DNF	—	
63	Maurizio Fondriest	Italy	Cofidis	DNF	—	
64	Philippe Gaumont	France	Cofidis	DNF	—	
65	Stéphane Goubert	France	Cofidis	DNF	—	
66	Grzegorz Gwiazdowski	Poland	Cofidis	DNF	—	
67	David Plaza	Spain	Cofidis	17	+ 26' 00"	
68	Cyril Saugrain	France	Cofidis	DNF	—	
69	Bruno Thibout	France	Cofidis	DNF	—	
71	Chris Boardman	Great Britain	Crédit Agricole	DNF	—	
72	Cyril Bos	France	Crédit Agricole	DNF	—	
73	Frédéric Moncassin	France	Crédit Agricole	DNF	—	
74	Olivier Perraudeau	France	Crédit Agricole	DNF	—	
75	Stéphane Pétilleau	France	Crédit Agricole	DNF	—	
76	Arnaud Prétot	France	Crédit Agricole	DNF	—	
77	Eddy Seigneur	France	Crédit Agricole	DNF	—	
78	Cédric Vasseur	France	Crédit Agricole	DNF	—	
79	Henk Vogels	Australia	Crédit Agricole	DNF	—	
81	Eleuterio Anguita	Spain	Estepona en Marcha–Brepac	50	+ 1h 33' 31"	
82	Matías Cagigas Amedo	Spain	Estepona en Marcha–Brepac	93	+ 3h 04' 54"	
83	Francisco Cerezo	Spain	Estepona en Marcha–Brepac	DNF	—	
84	Ivan Cerioli	Italy	Estepona en Marcha–Brepac	DNF	—	
85	Carmelo Miranda	Spain	Estepona en Marcha–Brepac	DNF	—	
86	Victor Moratilla	Spain	Estepona en Marcha–Brepac	DNF	—	
87	Germán Nieto	Spain	Estepona en Marcha–Brepac	108	+ 4h 09' 30"	
88	Uwe Peschel	Germany	Estepona en Marcha–Brepac	91	+ 2h 59' 55"	
89	Juan Carlos Vicario	Spain	Estepona en Marcha–Brepac	39	+ 1h 09' 30"	
91	Íñigo Chaurreau	Spain	Euskaltel–Euskadi	28	+ 50' 33"	
92	Unai Etxebarria	Venezuela	Euskaltel–Euskadi	42	+ 1h 14' 28"	
93	Bingen Fernández	Spain	Euskaltel–Euskadi	DNF	—	
94	Ángel Castresana	Spain	Euskaltel–Euskadi	24	+ 44' 28"	
95	Ramón González Arrieta	Spain	Euskaltel–Euskadi	DNF	—	
96	Álvaro González de Galdeano	Spain	Euskaltel–Euskadi	7	+ 5' 51"	
97	Igor González de Galdeano	Spain	Euskaltel–Euskadi	DNF	—	
98	Roberto Laiseka	Spain	Euskaltel–Euskadi	DNF	—	
99	Iñaki Ayarzaguena Urkidi	Spain	Euskaltel–Euskadi	23	+ 40' 55"	
101	Fernando Escartín	Spain	Kelme–Costa Blanca	2	+ 1' 23"	
102	Francisco Cabello	Spain	Kelme–Costa Blanca	80	+ 2h 38' 20"	
103	Ángel Edo	Spain	Kelme–Costa Blanca	76	+ 2h 27' 43"	
104	Arsenio González	Spain	Kelme–Costa Blanca	31	+ 57' 09"	
105	Chepe González	Colombia	Kelme–Costa Blanca	DNF	—	
106	Roberto Heras	Spain	Kelme–Costa Blanca	6	+ 2' 58"	
107	José Luis Rodríguez Garcia	Spain	Kelme–Costa Blanca	64	+ 2h 05' 05"	
108	José Luis Rubiera	Spain	Kelme–Costa Blanca	26	+ 47' 30"	
109	Marcos-Antonio Serrano	Spain	Kelme–Costa Blanca	10	+ 10' 17"	
111	Mario Aerts	Belgium	Lotto–Mobistar	41	+ 1h 11' 23"	
112	Steve De Wolf	Belgium	Lotto–Mobistar	65	+ 2h 09' 02"	
113	Ludo Dierckxsens	Belgium	Lotto–Mobistar	34	+ 1h 01' 02"	
114	Joona Laukka	Finland	Lotto–Mobistar	85	+ 2h 51' 27"	
115	Laurent Madouas	France	Lotto–Mobistar	DNF	—	
116	Thierry Marichal	Belgium	Lotto–Mobistar	86	+ 2h 52' 02"	
117	Chris Peers	Belgium	Lotto–Mobistar	73	+ 2h 21' 30"	
118	Andrei Tchmil	Ukraine	Lotto–Mobistar	DNF	—	
119	Andrey Teteryuk	Kazakhstan	Lotto–Mobistar	DNF	—	
121	Frank Vandenbroucke	Belgium	Mapei–Bricobi	DNF	—	
122	Davide Bramati	Italy	Mapei–Bricobi	102	+ 3h 31' 07"	
123	Gianni Bugno	Italy	Mapei–Bricobi	84	+ 2h 49' 18"	
124	Giuseppe Di Grande	Italy	Mapei–Bricobi	DNF	—	
125	Giuliano Figueras	Italy	Mapei–Bricobi	56	+ 1h 43' 02"	
126	Paolo Lanfranchi	Italy	Mapei–Bricobi	DNF	—	
127	Nico Mattan	Belgium	Mapei–Bricobi	67	+ 2h 09' 37"	
128	Ján Svorada	Czech Republic	Mapei–Bricobi	DNF	—	
129	Oscar Camenzind	Switzerland	Mapei–Bricobi	16	+ 22' 25"	
131	Laurent Jalabert	France	ONCE	5	+ 2' 37"	
132	Íñigo Cuesta	Spain	ONCE	52	+ 1h 35' 38"	
133	Luis María Díaz De Otazu	Spain	ONCE	75	+ 2h 27' 04"	
134	Herminio Díaz Zabala	Spain	ONCE	72	+ 2h 20' 53"	
135	David Etxebarria	Spain	ONCE	30	+ 55' 25"	
136	Alberto Leanizbarrutia	Spain	ONCE	55	+ 1h 42' 46"	
137	Melcior Mauri	Spain	ONCE	35	+ 1h 02' 41"	
138	José Roberto Sierra	Spain	ONCE	54	+ 1h 42' 34"	
139	Mikel Zarrabeitia	Spain	ONCE	36	+ 1h 03' 42"	
141	Giuseppe Guerini	Italy	Team Polti	DNF	—	
142	Daniel Atienza	Spain	Team Polti	DNF	—	
143	Mirko Crepaldi	Italy	Team Polti	DNF	—	
144	Mirco Gualdi	Italy	Team Polti	21	+ 36' 01"	
145	Fabrizio Guidi	Italy	Team Polti	63	+ 2h 03' 08"	
146	Anthony Rokia	France	Team Polti	104	+ 3h 38' 59"	
147	Cristian Salvato	Italy	Team Polti	89	+ 2h 54' 43"	
148	Gianluca Valoti	Italy	Team Polti	46	+ 1h 18' 42"	
149	Mauro Zinetti	Italy	Team Polti	DNF	—	
151	Niki Aebersold	Switzerland	Post Swiss Team	27	+ 47' 43"	
152	Roger Beuchat	Switzerland	Post Swiss Team	100	+ 3h 29' 04"	
153	Pierre Bourquenoud	Switzerland	Post Swiss Team	60	+ 1h 59' 05"	
154	Richard Chassot	Switzerland	Post Swiss Team	87	+ 2h 52' 44"	
155	Franz Hotz	Switzerland	Post Swiss Team	66	+ 2h 09' 03"	
156	Rolf Huser	Switzerland	Post Swiss Team	58	+ 1h 47' 13"	
157	Daniel Paradis	Switzerland	Post Swiss Team	88	+ 2h 53' 26"	
158	Guido Wirz	Switzerland	Post Swiss Team	DNF	—	
159	Markus Zberg	Switzerland	Post Swiss Team	57	+ 1h 43' 32"	
161	Michael Boogerd	Netherlands	Rabobank	49	+ 1h 32' 35"	
162	Erik Dekker	Netherlands	Rabobank	DNF	—	
163	Marc Lotz	Netherlands	Rabobank	103	+ 3h 36' 03"	
164	Robbie McEwen	Australia	Rabobank	DNF	—	
165	Koos Moerenhout	Netherlands	Rabobank	DNF	—	
166	Rolf Sørensen	Denmark	Rabobank	59	+ 1h 49' 48"	
167	Léon van Bon	Netherlands	Rabobank	DNF	—	
168	Max van Heeswijk	Netherlands	Rabobank	94	+ 3h 05' 50"	
169	Marc Wauters	Belgium	Rabobank	74	+ 2h 21' 43"	
171	Harald Morscher	Austria	Saeco–Cannondale	97	+ 3h 10' 13"	
172	Philipp Buschor	Switzerland	Saeco–Cannondale	62	+ 2h 01' 43"	
173	Salvatore Commesso	Italy	Saeco–Cannondale	53	+ 1h 38' 27"	
174	Dario Frigo	Italy	Saeco–Cannondale	DNF	—	
175	Vitali Kokorine	Russia	Saeco–Cannondale	40	+ 1h 11' 05"	
176	Pavel Padrnos	Czech Republic	Saeco–Cannondale	DNF	—	
177	Alexandre Moos	Switzerland	Saeco–Cannondale	DNF	—	
178	Michael Rich	Germany	Saeco–Cannondale	92	+ 3h 00' 57"	
179	Paolo Savoldelli	Italy	Saeco–Cannondale	DNF	—	
181	Andreas Klöden	Germany	Team Telekom	DNF	—	
182	Dirk Baldinger	Germany	Team Telekom	DNF	—	
183	Michael Blaudzun	Denmark	Team Telekom	DNF	—	
184	Bert Dietz	Germany	Team Telekom	79	+ 2h 36' 46"	
185	Kai Hundertmarck	Germany	Team Telekom	81	+ 2h 40' 35"	
186	Giovanni Lombardi	Italy	Team Telekom	DNF	—	
187	Dirk Müller	Germany	Team Telekom	DNF	—	
188	Jan Schaffrath	Germany	Team Telekom	DNF	—	
189	Georg Totschnig	Austria	Team Telekom	71	+ 2h 17' 53"	
191	Jeroen Blijlevens	Netherlands	TVM–Farm Frites	DNF	—	
192	Steven de Jongh	Netherlands	TVM–Farm Frites	DNF	—	
193	Servais Knaven	Netherlands	TVM–Farm Frites	DNF	—	
194	Michel Lafis	Sweden	TVM–Farm Frites	70	+ 2h 13' 10"	
195	Claus Michael Møller	Denmark	TVM–Farm Frites	25	+ 45' 06"	
196	Serguei Outschakov	Ukraine	TVM–Farm Frites	DNF	—	
197	Tristan Hoffman	Netherlands	TVM–Farm Frites	95	+ 3h 06' 06"	
198	Peter Van Petegem	Belgium	TVM–Farm Frites	DNF	—	
199	Bart Voskamp	Netherlands	TVM–Farm Frites	DNF	—	
201	Lance Armstrong	United States	U.S. Postal Service	DSQ	–	
202	Viatcheslav Ekimov	Russia	U.S. Postal Service	DNF	—	
203	Joan Llaneras	Spain	U.S. Postal Service	DNF	—	
204	Peter Meinert Nielsen	Denmark	U.S. Postal Service	82	+ 2h 41' 29"	
205	Jean-Cyril Robin	France	U.S. Postal Service	DNF	—	
206	Sven Teutenberg	Germany	U.S. Postal Service	DNF	—	
207	Christian Vande Velde	United States	U.S. Postal Service	90	+ 2h 56' 33"	
208	Jonathan Vaughters	United States	U.S. Postal Service	107	+ 3h 46' 13"	
209	Anton Villatoro	Guatemala	U.S. Postal Service	DNF	—	
211	Ángel Casero	Spain	Vitalicio Seguros	DNF	—	
212	Santiago Blanco	Spain	Vitalicio Seguros	32	+ 57' 42"	
213	Elio Aggiano	Italy	Vitalicio Seguros	DNF	—	
214	Daniel Clavero	Spain	Vitalicio Seguros	DNF	—	
215	Juan Carlos Domínguez	Spain	Vitalicio Seguros	DNF	—	
216	David García Marquina	Spain	Vitalicio Seguros	DNF	—	
217	Prudencio Induráin	Spain	Vitalicio Seguros	DNF	—	
218	Serguei Smetanine	Russia	Vitalicio Seguros	61	+ 2h 01' 11"	
219	Andrei Zintchenko	Russia	Vitalicio Seguros	14	+ 19' 14"	
