= 2001 Vuelta a España =

56th edition of the Vuelta a España

Race details
- Dates: September 8–30, 2001
- Stages: 21
- Distance: 3,012.2 km (1,872 mi)
- Winning time: 70h 49' 05"

Results
Jersey awarded to the overall winner	Winner	Ángel Casero (ESP)	(Festina)
	Second	Óscar Sevilla (ESP)	(Kelme–Costa Blanca)
	Third	Levi Leipheimer (USA)	(U.S. Postal Service)
Jersey awarded to the points classification winner	Points	José María Jiménez (ESP)	(iBanesto.com)
Jersey awarded to the mountains classification winner	Mountains	José María Jiménez (ESP)	(iBanesto.com)
Jersey awarded to the sprints classification winner	Sprints	César García Calvo (ESP)	(Colchon Relax–Fuenlabrada)
	Team	iBanesto.com	

The 56th edition of the Vuelta a España (Tour of Spain), a long-distance stage race and one of the three Grand Tours, was held from 8 September to 30 September 2001. It consisted of 21 stages covering a total of 3,012 km (1,872 mi), and was won by Ángel Casero of the Festina cycling team at a speed of 42.534 km/h (26.429 mph).

This edition of the Vuelta was notable for its final-stage time trial, during which Casero overcame a 25-second lead held by Óscar Sevilla of Kelme–Costa Blanca to win, while American Levi Leipheimer of U.S. Postal Service managed to move past both teammate Roberto Heras and Juan Miguel Mercado to take third and become the first American ever to achieve a podium finish in the Vuelta. Additionally, Guido Trenti became the first American ever to win a stage in the race.

== Teams ==
A total of 21 teams were invited to participate in the 2001 Vuelta a España. Fifteen of the competing squads were UCI Division I teams, while the other six teams were UCI Division II. Mercury–Viatel, who were previously scheduled to ride, didn't start. Each team sent a squad of nine riders, so the Vuelta began with a peloton of 189 cyclists, a total of 139 riders made it to the finish in Madrid.

The 21 teams invited to the race were:

UCI Division I teams

- Cofidis
- Domo–Farm Frites–Latexco
- Euskaltel–Euskadi
- Festina
- iBanesto.com
- Kelme–Costa Blanca
- Lampre–Daikin
- Mapei–Quick-Step
- Mercatone Uno–Stream TV
- ONCE–Eroski
- Rabobank
- Saeco
- Team Coast–Buffalo
- Team Telekom
- U.S. Postal Service

UCI Division II teams

- Alessio
- Cantina Tollo–Acqua & Sapone
- Ceramiche Panaria–Fiordo
- Colchon Relax–Fuenlabrada
- Jazztel–Costa de Almería
- Milaneza–MSS

== Stages ==
Stage characteristics and winners
Stage	Date	Course	Distance	Type		Winner
1	8 September	Salamanca	12 km (7 mi)		Individual time trial	David Millar (GBR)
2	9 September	Salamanca to Valladolid	147.2 km (91 mi)		Flat stage	Erik Zabel (GER)
3	10 September	Valladolid to León	140.5 km (87 mi)		Flat stage	Erik Zabel (GER)
4	11 September	León to Gijón	175 km (109 mi)		Flat stage	Erik Zabel (GER)
5	12 September	Gijón to Lagos de Covadonga	160.8 km (100 mi)		Mountain stage	Juan Miguel Mercado (ESP)
6	13 September	Cangas de Onís to Torrelavega	180.6 km (112 mi)		Medium-mountain stage	David Millar (GBR)
7	14 September	Torrelavega	44.2 km (27 mi)		Individual time trial	Santiago Botero (COL)
8	15 September	Reinosa to Alto de la Cruz de la Demanda (Valdezcaray)	195 km (121 mi)		Mountain stage	José María Jiménez (ESP)
9	16 September	Logroño to Zaragoza	179.2 km (111 mi)		Flat stage	Igor González de Galdeano (ESP)
	17 September	Province of Barcelona			Rest day	
10	18 September	Sabadell to La Molina	168.4 km (105 mi)		Mountain stage	Santiago Blanco (ESP)
11	19 September	Alp to Estació de Pal (Andorra)	154.2 km (96 mi)		Mountain stage	José María Jiménez (ESP)
12	20 September	Ordino to Estació d'Esquí d'Ordino-Alcalís (Andorra)	17.1 km (11 mi)	Mountain stage	Mountain time trial	José María Jiménez (ESP)
13	21 September	Andorra to Universal Studios Port Aventura	206 km (128 mi)		Hilly stage	Beat Zberg (SUI)
14	22 September	Tarragona to Vinaròs	170.5 km (106 mi)		Flat stage	Juan Manuel Gárate (ESP)
15	23 September	Valencia to Alto de Aitana	207.2 km (129 mi)		Mountain stage	Claus Michael Møller (DEN)
	24 September	Province of Valencia			Rest day	
16	25 September	Alcoy to Murcia	153.3 km (95 mi)		Hilly stage	Tomáš Konečný (CZE)
17	26 September	Murcia to Albacete	159.5 km (99 mi)		Flat stage	Robert Hunter (RSA)
18	27 September	Albacete to Cuenca	154.2 km (96 mi)		Flat stage	Filippo Simeoni (ITA)
19	28 September	Cuenca to Guadalajara	168 km (104 mi)		Hilly stage	Guido Trenti (USA)
20	29 September	Guadalajara to Alto de Abantos	176.3 km (110 mi)		Mountain stage	Gilberto Simoni (ITA)
21	30 September	Madrid	38 km (24 mi)		Individual time trial	Santiago Botero (COL)
	Total		3,012.2 km (1,872 mi)			

== Jersey progress ==
Stage	Winner	General classification	Points Classification	Mountains Classification	Team Classification
1 (ITT)	David Millar	David Millar	David Millar	David Millar	Kelme–Costa Blanca
2	Erik Zabel	David Millar	David Millar	David Millar	Kelme–Costa Blanca
3	Erik Zabel	David Millar	Erik Zabel	David Millar	Kelme–Costa Blanca
4	Erik Zabel	Santiago Botero	Erik Zabel	Karsten Kroon	Mapei–Quick-Step
5	Juan Miguel Mercado	Óscar Sevilla	Erik Zabel	Juan Miguel Mercado	iBanesto.com
6	David Millar	Óscar Sevilla	Erik Zabel	Juan Miguel Mercado	iBanesto.com
7 (ITT)	Santiago Botero	Santiago Botero	Erik Zabel	Juan Miguel Mercado	Kelme–Costa Blanca
8	José María Jiménez	Joseba Beloki	Erik Zabel	Juan Miguel Mercado	Festina
9	Igor González de Galdeano	Joseba Beloki	Erik Zabel	Juan Miguel Mercado	Festina
10	Santiago Blanco	Joseba Beloki	Erik Zabel	Juan Miguel Mercado	iBanesto.com
11	José María Jiménez	Óscar Sevilla	Erik Zabel	José María Jiménez	iBanesto.com
12	José María Jiménez	Óscar Sevilla	José María Jiménez	José María Jiménez	iBanesto.com
13	Beat Zberg	Óscar Sevilla	José María Jiménez	José María Jiménez	iBanesto.com
14	Juan Manuel Gárate	Óscar Sevilla	José María Jiménez	José María Jiménez	iBanesto.com
15	Claus Michael Møller	Óscar Sevilla	José María Jiménez	José María Jiménez	iBanesto.com
16	Tomáš Konečný	Óscar Sevilla	José María Jiménez	José María Jiménez	iBanesto.com
17	Robert Hunter	Óscar Sevilla	José María Jiménez	José María Jiménez	iBanesto.com
18	Filippo Simeoni	Óscar Sevilla	Erik Zabel	José María Jiménez	iBanesto.com
19	Guido Trenti	Óscar Sevilla	Erik Zabel	José María Jiménez	iBanesto.com
20	Gilberto Simoni	Óscar Sevilla	José María Jiménez	José María Jiménez	iBanesto.com
21 (ITT)	Santiago Botero	Ángel Casero	José María Jiménez	José María Jiménez	iBanesto.com
Stage	Winner	Ángel Casero	José María Jiménez	José María Jiménez	iBanesto.com

== Final standings ==
Legend
General classification	Denotes the winner of the general classification	Mountains classification	Denotes the leader of the mountains classification
Points classification	Denotes the leader of the points classification	A green jersey	Denotes the winner of the sprints classification

=== General classification ===
Final general classification (1–10)
Rank	Rider	Team	Time
1	Ángel Casero (ESP)	Festina	70h 49' 05"
2	Óscar Sevilla (ESP)	Kelme–Costa Blanca	+ 0' 47"
DSQ	~~Levi Leipheimer (USA)~~	~~U.S. Postal Service~~	~~+ 2' 59"~~
4	Roberto Heras (ESP)	U.S. Postal Service	+ 3' 56"
5	Juan Miguel Mercado (ESP)	iBanesto.com	+ 5' 45"
6	David Plaza (ESP)	Festina	+ 5' 53"
7	José Luis Rubiera (ESP)	U.S. Postal Service	+ 6' 57"
8	Claus Michael Møller (DEN)	Milaneza–MSS	+ 7' 13"
9	Aitor Osa (ESP)	iBanesto.com	+ 8' 32"
10	Fernando Escartín (ESP)	Team Coast–Buffalo	+ 10' 31"

Final general classification (11–25)
Rank	Rider	Team	Time
11	Iban Mayo (ESP)	Euskaltel–Euskadi	+ 12' 58"
12	Roberto Laiseka (ESP)	Euskaltel–Euskadi	+ 13' 32"
13	Íñigo Cuesta (ESP)	Cofidis	+ 14' 00"
14	Luis Pérez Rodríguez (ESP)	Festina	+ 20' 07"
15	Félix García Casas (ESP)	Festina	+ 21' 01"
16	Tomáš Konečný (CZE)	Domo–Farm Frites–Latexco	+ 23' 32"
17	José María Jiménez (ESP)	iBanesto.com	+ 24' 23"
18	Santiago Botero (COL)	Kelme–Costa Blanca	+ 25' 01"
19	Manuel Beltrán (ESP)	Mapei–Quick-Step	+ 27' 14"
20	Franco Pellizotti (ITA)	Alessio	+ 27' 58"
21	Santiago Blanco (ESP)	iBanesto.com	+ 28' 56"
22	Unai Osa (ESP)	iBanesto.com	+ 33' 30"
23	Roberto Conti (ITA)	Cantina Tollo–Acqua & Sapone	+ 34' 03"
24	Richard Virenque (FRA)	Domo–Farm Frites–Latexco	+ 38' 45"
25	Mikel Zarrabeitia (ESP)	ONCE–Eroski	+ 39' 06"

=== Points classification ===
Final points classification (1–10)
Rank	Rider	Team	Points
1	José María Jiménez (ESP)	iBanesto.com	130
2	Erik Zabel (GER)	Team Telekom	125
DSQ	~~Levi Leipheimer (USA)~~	~~U.S. Postal Service~~	~~115~~
4	Santiago Botero (COL)	Kelme–Costa Blanca	102
5	Óscar Sevilla (ESP)	Kelme–Costa Blanca	101
DSQ	~~David Millar (GBR)~~	~~Cofidis~~.	~~93~~
7	Claus Michael Møller (DEN)	Milaneza–MSS	89
8	Ángel Casero (ESP)	Festina	88
9	Juan Miguel Mercado (ESP)	iBanesto.com	77
10	Sven Teutenberg (GER)	Festina	70

=== Mountains classification ===
Final mountains classification (1–10)
Rank	Rider	Team	Points
1	José María Jiménez (ESP)	iBanesto.com	162
2	Claus Michael Møller (DEN)	Milaneza–MSS	110
3	Juan Miguel Mercado (ESP)	iBanesto.com	88
4	Óscar Sevilla (ESP)	Kelme–Costa Blanca	82
5	José Luis Rubiera (ESP)	U.S. Postal Service	55
6	Gilberto Simoni (ITA)	Lampre–Daikin	53
7	Roberto Heras (ESP)	U.S. Postal Service	50
8	Íñigo Cuesta (ESP)	Cofidis	49
9	Santiago Blanco (ESP)	iBanesto.com	48
10	Félix Cárdenas (COL)	Kelme–Costa Blanca	42

=== Sprints classification ===
Final sprints classification (1–10)
Rank	Rider	Team	Time
1	César García Calvo (ESP)	Colchon Relax–Fuenlabrada	40
2	Robert Hunter (RSA)	Lampre–Daikin	20
3	Óscar Laguna (ESP)	Colchon Relax–Fuenlabrada	19
4	Erik Zabel (GER)	Team Telekom	16
5	Pedro Díaz Lobato (ESP)	Jazztel–Costa de Almería	14
6	José Manuel Vázquez (ESP)	Colchon Relax–Fuenlabrada	12
7	Germán Nieto (ESP)	Colchon Relax–Fuenlabrada	12
8	Juan Manuel Gárate (ESP)	Lampre–Daikin	12
9	Karsten Kroon (NED)	Rabobank	11
10	Guido Trenti (ITA)	Cantina Tollo–Acqua & Sapone	11

=== Team classification ===
Final team classification (1–10)
Rank	Team	Time
1	iBanesto.com	212h 05' 24"
2	U.S. Postal Service	+ 23' 47"
3	Festina	+ 26' 08"
4	Kelme–Costa Blanca	+ 1h 01' 11"
5	Euskaltel–Euskadi	+ 1h 03' 31"
6	Milaneza–MSS	+ 1h 36' 55"
7	ONCE–Eroski	+ 1h 53' 28"
8	Cofidis	+ 1h 54' 12"
9	Mapei–Quick-Step	+ 2h 08' 36"
10	Domo–Farm Frites–Latexco	+ 2h 24' 36"
