= 2002 Volta a Catalunya =

Race details
- Dates: 17–23 June 2002
- Stages: 7
- Distance: 713.9 km (443.6 mi)
- Winning time: 17h 27' 20"

Results
	Winner	Roberto Heras (ESP)	(U.S. Postal Service)
	Second	Aitor Garmendia (ESP)	(Team Coast)
	Third	Luis Pérez Rodríguez (ESP)	(Team Coast)
	Points	Benjamín Noval (ESP)	(Colchon Relax–Fuenlabrada)
	Mountains	José Antonio Garrido (ESP)	(Jazztel–Costa de Almería)
	Sprints	Carlos Torrent (ESP)	(Jazztel–Costa de Almería)
	Team	Team Coast	

The 2002 Volta a Catalunya was the 82nd edition of the Volta a Catalunya cycle race and was held from 17 June to 23 June 2002. The race started in Sant Jaume d'Enveja and finished in Barcelona. The race was won by Roberto Heras of the U.S. Postal Service team.

== Teams ==
Sixteen teams of up to eight riders started the race:

- ONCE–Eroski
- Team Coast
- Kelme–Costa Blanca
- Fassa Bortolo
- iBanesto.com
- Mapei–Quick-Step
- U.S. Postal Service
- Colchon Relax–Fuenlabrada
- Team Telekom
- Lotto–Adecco
- Euskaltel–Euskadi
- Cofidis
- Lampre–Daikin
- Jazztel–Costa de Almería
- Alessio
- Itera

== Route ==
Stage characteristics and winners
Stage	Date	Course	Distance	Type	Winner
1	17 June	Sant Jaume d'Enveja to Deltebre	30.9 km (19.2 mi)	Team time trial	U.S. Postal Service
2	18 June	La Sénia to Les Borges Blanques	182.9 km (113.6 mi)		Danilo Hondo (GER)
3	19 June	Sant Climent de Taull to Boí Taüll	10.8 km (6.7 mi)	Individual time trial	Aitor Garmendia (ESP)
4	20 June	Barruera to Station de Pal	52 km (32.3 mi)		José Antonio Garrido (ESP)
5	21 June	Andorra la Vella to Llívia	141.3 km (87.8 mi)		José Manuel Maestre (ESP)
6	22 June	Llívia to Montcada i Reixac	180.1 km (111.9 mi)		Tom Steels (BEL)
7	23 June	Montcada i Reixac to Barcelona	115.9 km (72.0 mi)		Dmitry Fofonov (KAZ)

== General classification ==
Final general classification

Rank	Rider	Team	Time
1	Roberto Heras (ESP)	U.S. Postal Service	17h 27' 20"
2	Aitor Garmendia (ESP)	Team Coast	+ 31"
3	Luis Pérez Rodríguez (ESP)	Team Coast	+ 44"
4	Mikel Zarrabeitia (ESP)	ONCE–Eroski	+ 51"
5	Fernando Escartín (ESP)	Team Coast	+ 1' 00"
6	Leonardo Piepoli (ITA)	iBanesto.com	+ 1' 04"
7	David Plaza (ESP)	Team Coast	+ 1' 38"
8	Francisco Mancebo (ESP)	iBanesto.com	+ 1' 47"
9	Benjamín Noval (ESP)	Colchon Relax–Fuenlabrada	+ 1' 48"
10	José Antonio Garrido (ESP)	Jazztel–Costa de Almería	+ 1' 51"
