= 2002 Volta a la Comunitat Valenciana =

Race details
- Dates: 26 February–2 March 2002
- Stages: 5
- Distance: 668.2 km (415.2 mi)
- Winning time: 17h 07' 06"

Results
	Winner	Alex Zülle (SUI)	(Team Coast)
	Second	Ivan Basso (ITA)	(Fassa Bortolo)
	Third	Claus Michael Møller (DEN)	(Milaneza–MSS)

The 2002 Volta a la Comunitat Valenciana was the 60th edition of the Volta a la Comunitat Valenciana road cycling stage race, which was held from 26 February to 2 March 2002. The race started in Calpe and finished in Valencia. The race was won by Alex Zülle of Team Coast.

== General classification ==
Final general classification

Rank	Rider	Team	Time
1	Alex Zülle (SUI)	Team Coast	17h 07' 06"
2	Ivan Basso (ITA)	Fassa Bortolo	+ 9"
3	Claus Michael Møller (DEN)	Milaneza–MSS	+ 48"
4	Antonio Colom (ESP)	Colchon Relax–Fuenlabrada	+ 49"
5	Javier Pascual Rodríguez (ESP)	iBanesto.com	+ 58"
6	Erik Dekker (NED)	Rabobank	+ 1' 02"
7	Jörg Jaksche (GER)	ONCE–Eroski	+ 1' 29"
8	David Cañada (ESP)	Mapei–Quick-Step	+ 1' 40"
9	Danilo Di Luca (ITA)	Saeco–Longoni Sport	+ 1' 58"
10	José Alberto Martínez (ESP)	Euskaltel–Euskadi	+ 1' 59"
