= 2003 Paris–Brussels =

Race details
- Dates: 13 September 2003
- Stages: 1
- Distance: 226 km (140 mi)
- Winning time: 5h 19' 00"

Results
	Winner	Kim Kirchen (LUX)	(Fassa Bortolo)
	Second	László Bodrogi (HUN)	(Quick-Step–Davitamon)
	Third	Maryan Hary (FRA)	(Brioches La Boulangère)

The 2003 Paris–Brussels was the 83rd edition of the Paris-Bruxelles cycling race and was held on 13 September 2003. The race started in Soissons and finished in Anderlecht. The race was won by Kim Kirchen of the Fassa Bortolo team.

== General classification ==
Final general classification

Rank	Rider	Team	Time
1	Kim Kirchen (LUX)	Fassa Bortolo	5h 19' 00"
2	László Bodrogi (HUN)	Quick-Step–Davitamon	+ 1"
3	Maryan Hary (FRA)	Brioches La Boulangère	+ 4"
4	Franck Rénier (FRA)	Lampre	+ 9"
5	Tony Bracke (BEL)	Landbouwkrediet–Colnago	s.t."
6	Óscar Freire (ESP)	Rabobank	+ 13"
7	Luca Paolini (ITA)	Quick-Step–Davitamon	+ 18"
8	Aart Vierhouten (NED)	Lotto–Domo	+ 21"
9	Marcel Strauss (SUI)	Gerolsteiner	s.t."
10	Romāns Vainšteins (LAT)	Vini Caldirola–So.di	s.t."
