= 1995 Paris–Tours =

Race details
- Dates: 15 October 1995
- Stages: 1
- Distance: 250 km (155.3 mi)
- Winning time: 5h 45' 55"

Results
| | Winner | Nicola Minali (ITA) | (Gewiss–Ballan) |
| | Second | Andrei Tchmil (UKR) | (Lotto–Isoglass) |
| | Third | Sven Teutenberg (GER) | (Novell–Decca–Colnago) |

The 1995 Paris–Tours was the 89th edition of the Paris–Tours cycle race and was held on 15 October 1995. The race started in Saint-Arnoult-en-Yvelines and finished in Tours. The race was won by Nicola Minali of the Gewiss–Ballan team.

== General classification ==
Final general classification

| Rank | Rider | Team | Time |
|---|---|---|---|
| 1 | Nicola Minali (ITA) | Gewiss–Ballan | 5h 45' 55" |
| 2 | Andrei Tchmil (UKR) | Lotto–Isoglass | + 0" |
| 3 | Sven Teutenberg (GER) | Novell–Decca–Colnago | + 0" |
| 4 | Jürgen Werner (GER) | Team Telekom | + 0" |
| 5 | Johan Capiot (BEL) | Refin | + 0" |
| 6 | Hendrik Redant (BEL) | TVM–Polis Direct | + 0" |
| 7 | Adriano Baffi (ITA) | Mapei–GB–Latexco | + 0" |
| 8 | Lars Michaelsen (DEN) | Festina–Lotus | + 0" |
| 9 | Michele Bartoli (ITA) | Mercatone Uno–Saeco | + 0" |
| 10 | Gabriele Missaglia (ITA) | Brescialat–Fago | + 0" |
