= Bekim Christensen =

Danish cyclist (born 1973)

Personal information
- Full name: Bekim Christensen
- Born: 17 September 1973 (age 53) Roskilde, Denmark

Cycling career
- Sport: Cycling
- Discipline: Road
- Role: Rider

Professional teams
- 1999: Team EC-Bayer
- 2000-2003: Team Coast
- 2003-2004: Team CSC

Bekim Christensen (born 17 September 1973) is a Danish retired professional road bicycle racer. He was regarded as a loyal and hardworking domestique, only winning one minor race himself before his retirement in 2004.

Starting his career in 1999 on Team EC-Bayer, Christensen would win his sole victory that year. He switched to Team Coast in 2000 where he rode with the big names of two-time Vuelta a España winner Alex Zülle and Tour de France stage winner Fernando Escartín. When the team turned into Team Bianchi in 2003, to solely focus on former Tour de France winner Jan Ullrich's 2003 Tour de France campaign, Christensen didn't follow the bulk of the Team Coast riders to Team Bianchi. Instead, he went on to ride for Team CSC where Christensen rode in support of team captain Tyler Hamilton in the 2003 Tour de France. Christensen ended his career at the end of the 2004 season.

== Major results ==
1991
Silver, Nordic Junior Championship
1999
Stagewin and King of the Mountains, Tour of Rhodes
2000
2nd on stage 1 and 4th overall, Tour de Cologne
2003
120th overall, 2003 Tour de France
136th overall, Vuelta a España
