= Pedro Horrillo =

Spanish cyclist

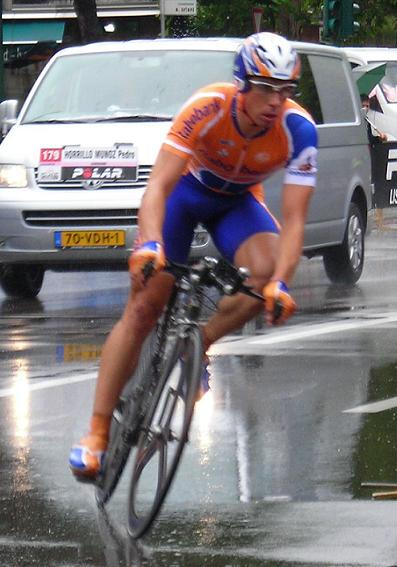

Personal information
- Full name: Pedro Horrillo Muñoz
- Born: 27 September 1974 (age 52) Eibar, Spain
- Height: 1.84 m (6 ft 0 in)
- Weight: 76 kg (168 lb)

Cycling career
- Sport: Cycling
- Current team: Retired
- Discipline: Road
- Role: Rider
- Rider type: Sprinter

Amateur team
- 1997: Café Baqué

Professional teams
- 1998–2000: Vitalicio Seguros
- 2001–2002: Mapei–Quick-Step
- 2003–2004: Quick-Step–Davitamon
- 2005–2009: Rabobank

Pedro Horrillo Muñoz (27 September 1974 in Eibar, Basque Country) is a Spanish retired racing cyclist who rode as a professional for Mapei, Quick-Step and Rabobank. He was forced to retire from professional cycling after a crash in the 2009 Giro d'Italia.

== Professional career ==
Before turning professional in 1998, Horrillo was a philosophy student at the University of the Basque Country. Horrillo turned professional with the Vitalicio Seguros team which included notable names such as Óscar Freire and Juan Miguel Mercado who would win three stages between them in the 2006 Tour de France. In 2001 Horrillo joined Freire at Mapei–Quick-Step; he would later ride for Quick-Step–Davitamon when the Italian company decided not to renew its sponsorship. His biggest win was a stage at the 2004 Paris–Nice race.

In 2005, Horrillo won a stage at the 2005 Volta a Catalunya and nearly won a stage at the 2005 Vuelta a España with a late attack until he was caught 200 metres from the line. Horrillo is a self-confessed fan of Paris–Roubaix, describing it as: "If I could only have ridden one race as a pro, that would have been it - and if possible, in the rain because that's the real Roubaix when it rains" (Cycle Sport magazine interview, November 2006 issue).

== Giro d'Italia crash and career end ==
On 16 May 2009, during the eighth stage of the Giro d'Italia, Horrillo experienced a horror crash, leaving him with life-threatening injuries. He had missed a curve in the descent of the Colle San Pietro and fallen 60 meters into a ravine before alpine paramedics could recover him. He was found because his bike had clung onto the railing by the roadside, as he was alone when the crash happened. He woke up in the ambulance on its way hospital, but doctors put him into a chemically induced coma to aid his treatment, having suffered multiple fractures to his thigh bones, kneecap and neck, in addition to a punctured lung. The next day, largely in reaction to Horrillo's dramatic injury, the peloton protested the safety conditions in the Giro, which led to Stage 9 being neutralized. He was taken out of the coma the following day, with scans revealing no brain injury, and Rabobank team doctors stated that he was to be moved to a hospital in Spain within ten days. Five weeks after the crash, after being transferred to Spain, it was announced that Horrillo was able to go home. Although he recovered from the injuries, he retired from professional cycling, unable to compete at the same level.

== Outside the peloton ==
A philosophy graduate, Horrillo is known as a good writer and has written columns for Dutch paper de Volkskrant during the Tour de France and has been a regular contributor to the Spanish newspaper El País. In 2009 he wrote a column concerning the UCI's whereabouts system called El Señor Adams for El País. The English version was entitled Mr Adams. He has a wife named Lorena.

== Major results ==
2000
1st Stage 9 Volta a Portugal
2nd Overall Vuelta a Mallorca
2nd Trofeo Andratx–Mirador d'es Colomer
2001
3rd Gran Premio Nobili Rubinetterie
5th Overall Niedersachsen-Rundfahrt

1st Stage 2

6th US Pro Championship
10th Overall Peace Race
2002
1st Stage 1 Euskal Bizikleta
2003
3rd Overall UNIQA Classic

1st Stage 1

2004
1st Stage 2 Paris–Nice
1st Stage 4 UNIQA Classic
2005
1st Stage 3 Volta a Catalunya
2006
1st Stage 1 Sachsen-Tour
