= Julian Usano =

Spanish cyclist

Personal information
- Full name: Julian Usano Martinez
- Born: 8 July 1976 (age 50) Museros, Spain

Cycling career
- Sport: Cycling
- Current team: Retired
- Discipline: Road
- Role: Rider

Professional team
- 1999-2003: Kelme

Julian Usano Martinez (born 8 July 1976 in Museros) is a former Spanish cyclist. He rode in the 2003 Tour de France and the 2003 Giro d'Italia.

== Major results ==
1999
1st stage 1 Volta del Llagostí
