= Claus Michael Møller =

Danish cyclist (born 1968)

Personal information
- Born: 3 October 1968 (age 58) Hjørring, Denmark
- Height: 1.82 m (6 ft 0 in)
- Weight: 70 kg (154 lb)

Cycling career
- Sport: Cycling
- Current team: Retired
- Discipline: Road

Amateur team
- 1994: TVM–Bison Kit (stagiaire)

Professional teams
- 1995–1997: Castellblanch
- 1998–1999: TVM–Farm Frites
- 2000–2003: União Ciclista da Maia
- 2004: Alessio–Bianchi
- 2005–2007: Barbot–Pascoal

Major wins
- Grand Tours Vuelta a España 1 individual stage (2001) Stage races Volta a Portugal (2002) Volta ao Algarve (2003)

Claus Michael Møller (born 3 October 1968) is a Danish former professional cyclist. He competed in the individual road race at the 1992 Summer Olympics. He turned professional in 1995 with the Castellblanch team before moving to Milaneza MSS in 2000. He won the overall classification of the Volta a Portugal in 2002, and was a stage winner in the 2001 Vuelta a España. He also won the Subida al Naranco in 2001, and won stages of the Volta a Portugal and the Trofeo Mallorca. His career was marred in the late 1990s by a suspension for doping; as a result he was also banned for life from representing the Danish national team.

== Major results ==
1990
1st Stage 1a Tour de Normandie
1991
6th Overall Tour of Sweden
1992
1st Grand Prix Herning
1994
1st Overall Vuelta a Extremadura
1st Overall Vuelta a Zamora

1st Stage 3

3rd Overall Rapport Toer
1995
1st Subida a Gorla
1st Memorial Valenciaga
1st Premio Nuestra Señora de Oro
1st Stage 6 Vuelta a Extremadura
2nd Overall Rutas de América
3rd Overall Vuelta a Castilla y León

1st Stage 3

1997
4th Overall Vuelta a Murcia
8th Overall Vuelta a Aragón
8th Trofeo Comunidad Foral de Navarra
1999
4th Overall Vuelta a Murcia
4th Overall Vuelta a Andalucía
6th Overall Volta a la Comunitat Valenciana
2000
1st Overall Volta ao Alentejo

1st Stage 4

1st Overall Grande Prémio Sport Noticias

1st Stage 5

1st Stage 3b (ITT) Troféu Joaquim Agostinho
2nd Overall Volta a Portugal

1st Stage 7

3rd Overall Grande Prémio Jornal de Notícias
9th Overall Vuelta a Asturias
2001
1st Subida al Naranco
8th Overall Vuelta a España

1st Stage 15

8th Overall Volta a Portugal
2002
1st Overall Volta a Portugal

1st Stages 9 & 13 (ITT)

3rd Overall Volta a la Comunitat Valenciana
6th Overall Volta ao Alentejo
8th Overall Vuelta a Murcia
2003
1st Overall Volta ao Algarve

1st Stage 4 (ITT)

2nd Overall Volta a Portugal

1st Stage 11 (ITT)

3rd Overall Gran Premio Mosqueteros-Ruta del Marqués

1st Stage 4 (ITT)

7th Overall Paris–Nice
2005
7th Overall Volta a Portugal

1st Stage 10 (ITT)

9th Overall Troféu Joaquim Agostinho
2006
6th Overall Volta a Portugal

=== Grand Tour general classification results timeline ===
Grand Tour	1996	1997	1998	1999	2000	2001	2002	2003	2004
Giro d'Italia	96	–	–	17	–	–	–	–	–
Tour de France	–	–	–	–	–	–	–	–	70
Vuelta Vuelta a España	–	WD	25	–	–	8	12	33	80

WD = Withdrew
