= Sven Teutenberg =

German cyclist

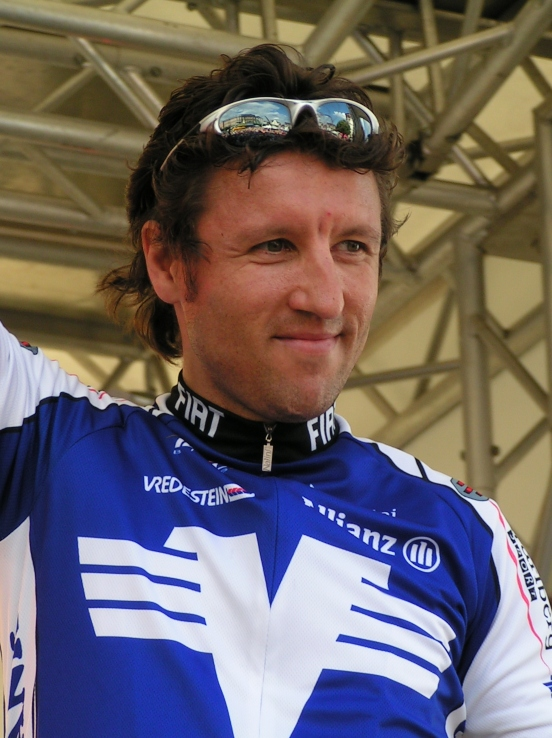

Personal information
- Full name: Sven Teutenberg
- Born: August 18, 1972 (age 54) Düsseldorf

Cycling career
- Sport: Cycling
- Current team: SG Kaarst
- Discipline: Road
- Role: Rider

Amateur teams
- 2005: SG Kaarst
- 2008: Cycling Club Düsseldorf
- 2012–: SG Kaarst

Professional teams
- 1993: Team Telekom
- 1994–1995: WordPerfect–Colnago–Decca
- 1996–1998: U.S. Postal Service
- 1999–2000: Gerolsteiner
- 2001: Festina
- 2002: Phonak
- 2003: Team Coast
- 2006–2007: Vorarlberger
- 2009: MTN Cycling

Sven Teutenberg (born August 18, 1972, in Düsseldorf) is a German cyclist, who currently rides for German amateur team SG Kaarst.

Teutenberg turned pro in 1993 with Team Telekom. He achieved a number of victories, especially in smaller races.

Teutenberg is the older brother of cyclist Ina-Yoko Teutenberg. He also has an older brother, Lars Teutenberg, who was also a professional cyclist. He was known as one of the best friends of Jan Ullrich.

== Major results ==
1993
1st Overall Circuit Franco-Belge

1st Stage 5

1st Stage 3 Bayern Rundfahrt
1994
Tour DuPont

1st Stages 2 & 9

1995
3rd Paris–Tours
1996
1st Overall Rutas de América

1st Stages 1b & 7

1st Stage 9 Tour DuPont
1st Stage 8 Commonwealth Bank Classic
1st Stage 1 Ster ZLM Toer
5th GP de la Ville de Rennes
1997
1st Rund um Düren
1998
1st Prologue Rheinland-Pfalz Rundfahrt
2000
6th Overall Bayern Rundfahrt

1st Stage 1a

2001
2nd Trofeo Luis Puig
2nd Grand Prix de la Ville de Lillers
2002
8th Road race, UCI Road World Championships
2003
1st Stage 4 3-Länder-Tour
2006
5th Veenendaal–Veenendaal Classic

=== Grand Tour general classification results timeline ===
| Grand Tour | 1995 | 1996 | 1997 | 1998 | 1999 | 2000 | 2001 | 2002 |
|---|---|---|---|---|---|---|---|---|
| Giro d'Italia | — | — | — | — | — | — | — | DNF |
| Tour de France | — | — | — | — | — | — | 80 | — |
| Vuelta a España | 113 | — | 111 | DNF | — | — | 134 | 132 |

Legend
| — | Did not compete |
| DNF | Did not finish |
