= José Antonio Garrido =

Spanish cyclist

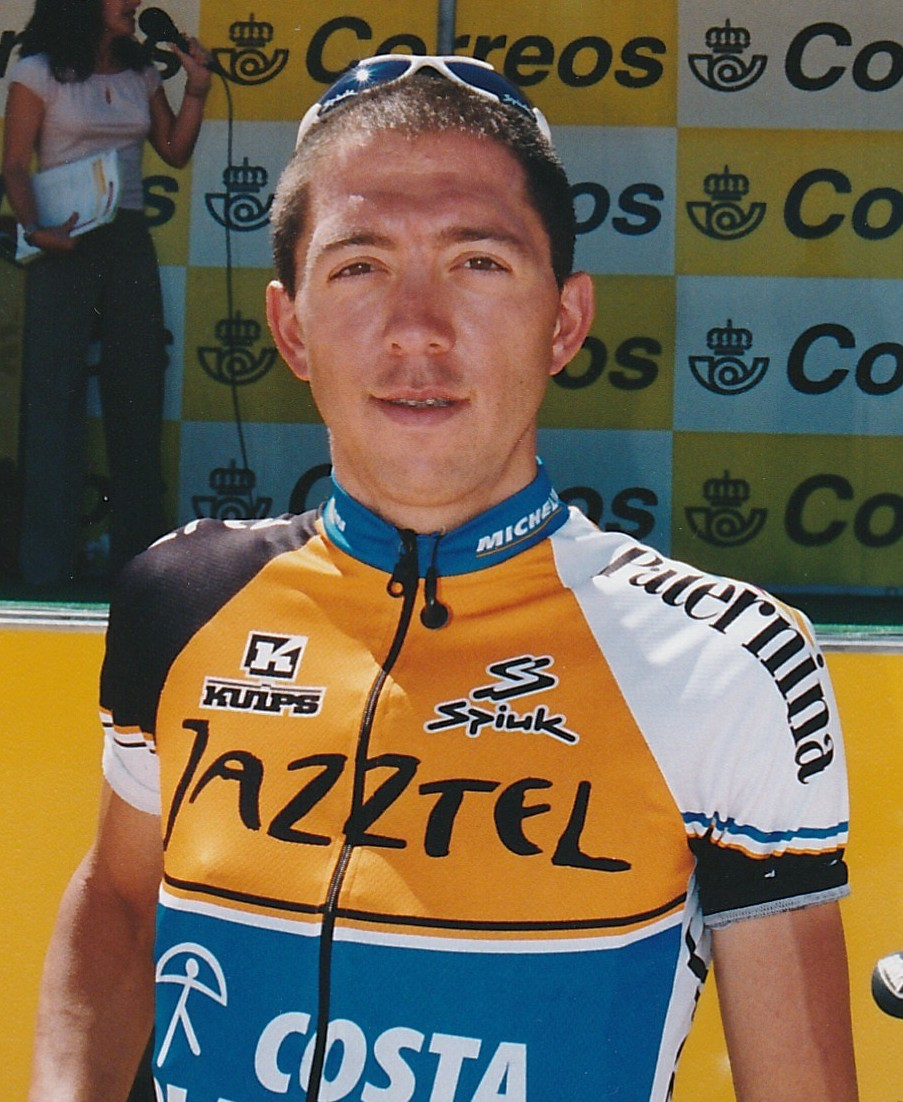

Personal information
- Full name: José Antonio Garrido Lima
- Born: November 28, 1975 (age 50) Barakaldo, Spain
- Height: 1.76 m (5 ft 9 in)
- Weight: 65 kg (143 lb)

Cycling career
- Sport: Cycling
- Discipline: Road
- Role: Rider

Professional teams
- 1999–2000: SL Benfica
- 2001–2003: Paternina-Costa de Almería
- 2004–2006: Quick Step-Innergetic

José Antonio Garrido Lima (born November 28, 1975, in Barakaldo, Basque Country) is a Spanish professional road bicycle racer. He currently rides for the UCI ProTour team Quick Step-Innergetic. Since turning professional in 1999, Garrido has achieved several top ten placings in Spanish stage races, including a fourth place, and wins in the combination competition and of stage 2, in the 2003 Clásica de Alcobendas. He recently joined the Portuguese LA MSS - Póvoa do Varzim.

== Palmarès ==
2000 – Benfica
Volta a Portugal

Stage 8 - winner

2001 – Jazztel-Costa de Almeria
Vuelta a Burgos

Metas Volantes competition - winner

2002 – Jazztel-Costa de Almeria
Volta a Catalunya

Overall - 10th

2003 – Paternina-Costa de Almeria
Clásica de Alcobendas

Overall - 4th
Stage 2 - winner
Combination competition - winner

Vuelta a Castilla y León

Overall - 6th

Vuelta Asturias

Overall - 9th
