= Maryan Hary =

French cyclist

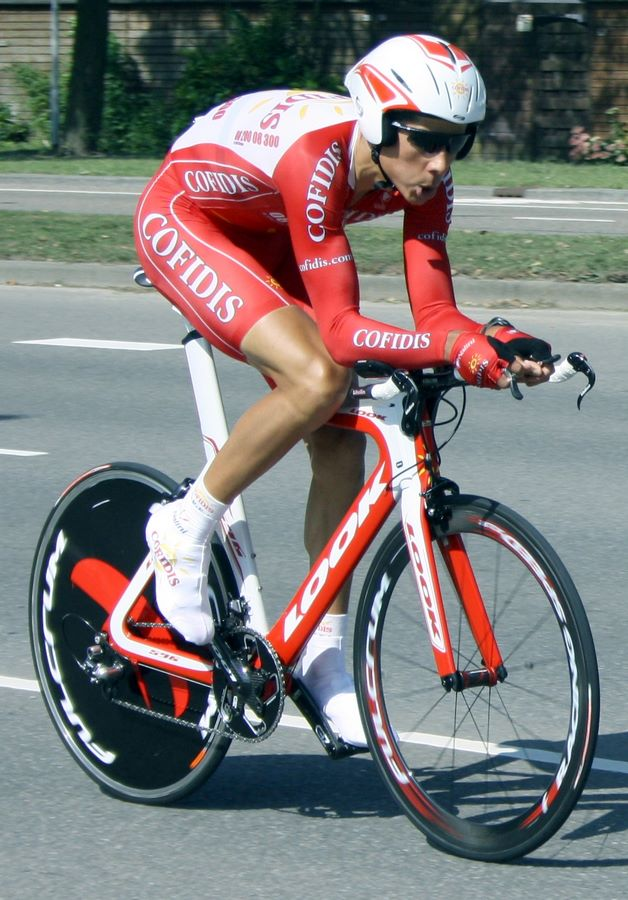

Personal information
- Full name: Maryan Hary
- Born: 27 May 1980 (age 46) Le Mans, France
- Height: 1.85 m (6 ft 1 in)
- Weight: 68 kg (150 lb)

Cycling career
- Sport: Cycling
- Current team: Unattached
- Discipline: Road
- Role: Rider

Professional teams
- 2003–2006: Brioches La Boulangère
- 2007–2009: Cofidis

Maryan Hary (born 27 May 1980 in Le Mans) is a French professional road bicycle racer.

== Major results ==
- Tour de l'Ain - 1 stage (2003)
- Paris–Tours U23 (2002)
