= Guido Trenti =

American-Italian cyclist

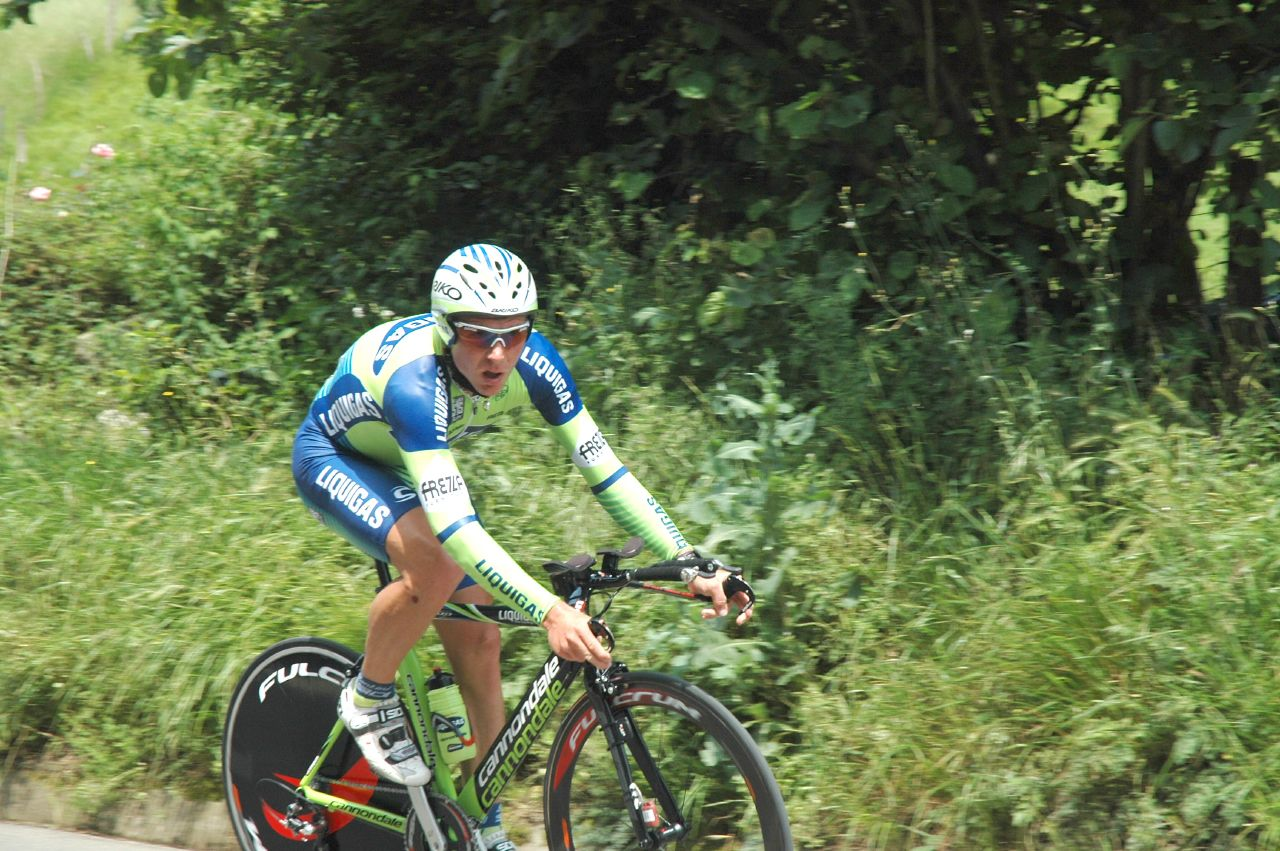

Personal information
- Full name: Guido Trenti
- Born: December 27, 1972 (age 53) Milan, Italy
- Height: 1.80 m (5 ft 11 in)
- Weight: 68 kg (150 lb)

Cycling career
- Sport: Cycling
- Current team: Retired
- Discipline: Road
- Role: Rider
- Rider type: Sprinter

Professional teams
- 1996: Ideal
- 1998: Vini Caldirola
- 1999–2000: Cantina Tollo–Alexia Alluminio
- 2001–2004: Fassa Bortolo
- 2005–2006: Quick-Step–Innergetic
- 2007–2008: Liquigas

Major wins
- Grand Tours Vuelta a España 1 individual stage (2001)

Guido Trenti (born December 27, 1972, in Milan) is an American-Italian former professional road racing cyclist who has ridden in each of the three Grand Tours.

Trenti was born to an American mother and Italian father, allowing him to maintain dual citizenship. In 2001, he became the first American to win a stage at the Vuelta a España. In 2002, Trenti represented the United States at the World Cycling Championships, mainly because he was not selected by the Italian team.

He lives in Mussolente during the racing season.

== Major results ==
2000
1st Stage 9 Tour de Langkawi
2001
1st Stage 19 Vuelta a España (Cuenca > Guadalajara)
2nd Giro del Friuli
2002
3rd Gran Premio della Costa Etruschi

=== Grand Tour general classification results timeline ===
Grand Tour	1998	1999	2000	2001	2002	2003	2004	2005
Giro d'Italia	—	106	99	124	125	DNF	—	—
Tour de France	—	—	—	—	—	—	—	139
Vuelta a España	105	—	91	81	DNF	153	113	DNF

Legend
DSQ	Disqualified
DNF	Did not finish
