= União Ciclista da Maia =

Portuguese professional cycling team

Team information
- UCI code: POV
- Registered: Portugal
- Founded: 1994
- Disbanded: 2008
- Discipline: Road
- Status: Trade Team II (1998–2001); Trade Team I (2002–2004); Continental (2005–2008)
- Bicycles: Orbea

Key personnel
- General manager: Manuel Zeferino

Team name history
- 1994 1995 1996 1997–1999 2000 2001–2003 2004–2005 2006 2007 2008: Maia–Jumbo–Serrata-Beirão (MAI); Maia–Jumbo (MAI); Maia–Jumbo–CIN (MAI); Maia–CIN (MAI); União Ciclista da Maia–MSS (MAI); Milaneza–MSS (MIL); Milaneza–Maia (MIL); Maia–Milaneza (MAI); LA–MSS (MAI); LA–MSS (POV)
Jersey

LA-MSS (UCI team code: POV) was a Portuguese UCI Continental cycling team originally based in Maia, Portugal, later in Póvoa de Varzim, that disbanded by mid 2008 after a police raid at the headquarters.

The team received wildcard invitations to the Vuelta a España in 1996, 1997, 2001, 2002 and 2003.

== Major wins ==
1998
Portuguese National Road Race, Carlos Carneiro
Overall Troféu Joaquim Agostinho, José Azevedo

Stage 3 & 5, José Azevedo

Stage 5 Volta a Portugal, José Azevedo
2004
Mountains classification Volta ao Algarve, Gonçalo Amorim
Stage 5 Setmana Catalana de Ciclisme, Ángel Edo
Overall GP MR Cortez-Mitsubishi, Ángel Edo

Points classification, Ángel Edo
Stage 1, Ángel Edo
Stage 3 & 4, Pedro Cardoso

Mountains classification Volta ao Alentejo, Bruno Pires

Stage 2, Hugo Sabido

Overall Troféu Joaquim Agostinho, David Bernabeu

Team classification
Stage 2, Ángel Edo

Overall Volta a Portugal, David Bernabeu

Team classification

Team classification Tour de Pologne

Stage 7, Hugo Sabido

2005
Stage 3 Volta ao Algarve, Alexei Markov
Team classification GP Internacional do Oeste/RTP

Stages 2 & 4, Alexei Markov

Overall GP CTT Correios de Portugal, Alexei Markov

Points classification, Alexei Markov
Stage 1 & 2, Alexei Markov

Team classification Troféu Joaquim Agostinho

Points classification, Danail Petrov
Mountains classification, Danail Petrov
Stage 1, Alexei Markov
Stage 3, Danail Petrov

2006
Mountains classification GP Costa Azul, Danail Petrov
Overall Volta ao Algarve, João Cabreira

Team classification
Stage 5, João Cabreira

Mountains classification GP CTT Correios de Portugal, Pedro Cardoso
Portuguese Road Race Championship, Bruno Pires
Overall Troféu Joaquim Agostinho, Danail Petrov

Stage 3, Danail Petrov

Stage 7 Volta a Portugal, João Cabreira
2007
Stage 4 Volta ao Alentejo, Bruno Pires
Team classification GP Rota dos Móveis

Stage 4, Bruno Pires

Overall GP CTT Correios de Portugal, Pedro Cardoso

Team classification

Overall Troféu Joaquim Agostinho, Xavier Tondo

Team classification
Prologue, Xavier Tondo

Overall Volta a Portugal, Xavier Tondo
2008
Team classification Volta ao Alentejo

Stage 4, Bruno Pires

Subida al Naranco, Xavier Tondo
Overall Vuelta a Asturias, Ángel Vicioso

Team classification
Stage 1, Ángel Vicioso

Overall GP Rota dos Móveis, Constantino Zaballa

Team classification
Points classification, Ángel Vicioso
Stage 3, Constantino Zaballa

Portuguese Road Race Championship, João Cabreira
Team classification Vuelta a la Comunidad de Madrid

Points classification, Ángel Vicioso
Sprints classification, José Antonio Garrido
Stage 2, Ángel Vicioso

== National champions ==
1996
Portuguese Time Trial Championship, José Azevedo
1997
Portuguese Time Trial Championship, José Azevedo
1998
Portuguese Road Race Championship, Carlos Alberto Carneiro
1999
Portuguese Road Race Championship, Carlos Alberto Carneiro
2002
Portuguese Road Race Championship, Rui Lavarinhas
2004
Portuguese Road Race Championship, Bruno Castanheira
2006
Portuguese Road Race Championship, Bruno Pires
2008
Portuguese Road Race Championship, João Cabreira

== Team roster ==
As of January 2008

Rider	Date of birth
Afonso Azevedo (POR)	18 July 1984 (aged 23)
Rogério Batista (POR)	12 February 1983 (aged 24)
João Cabreira (POR)	12 May 1982 (aged 25)
Pedro Cardoso (POR)	12 April 1974 (aged 33)
Claudio Faria (POR)	1 October 1977 (aged 30)
José Antonio Garrido (ESP)	28 November 1975 (aged 32)
Bruno Neves (POR)	9 May 1981 (aged 26)
Bruno Pires (POR)	15 May 1981 (aged 26)
Pedro Romero Ocampo (ESP)	4 June 1982 (aged 25)
Tiago Silva (POR)	6 October 1986 (aged 21)
Xavier Tondo (POR)	5 November 1978 (aged 29)
Ángel Vicioso (ESP)	13 April 1977 (aged 30)
Constantino Zaballa (ESP)	15 May 1978 (aged 29)
