= Ángel Casero =

Spanish cyclist

Personal information
- Full name: Ángel Luis Casero Moreno
- Born: 27 September 1972 (age 54) Albalat dels Tarongers, Spain
- Height: 1.83 m (6 ft 0 in)
- Weight: 74 kg (163 lb; 11 st 9 lb)

Cycling career
- Sport: Cycling
- Current team: Retired
- Discipline: Road
- Role: Rider
- Rider type: Climber

Professional teams
- 1993–1997: Banesto
- 1998–1999: Vitalicio Seguros
- 2000–2001: Festina
- 2002–2003: Team Coast
- 2004–2005: Comunidad Valenciana–Kelme

Major wins
- Grand Tours Vuelta a España General classification (2001) Single-day races and Classics National Road Race Championships (1998, 1999)

Ángel Luis Casero Moreno (born 27 September 1972 in Albalat dels Tarongers, Province of Valencia) is a retired Spanish road bicycle racer who raced professionally between 1994 and 2005.

His first win was at the 1995 Clásica a los Puertos de Guadarrama, followed by the 1997 Vuelta a Castilla y León. In 1998 and 1999, he was the Spanish national champion; in 1999, he finished fifth in the Tour de France. He finished second in the Vuelta a España in 2000 and won it in 2001. His name was later tied to the Operation Puerto doping case.

== Career achievements ==
=== Major results ===
1993
8th Overall Tour de l'Avenir
1994
1st Overall Tour de l'Avenir
3rd Overall Vuelta a Mallorca
10th Overall Tour de Luxembourg
1995
1st Clásica a los Puertos de Guadarrama
2nd Time trial, National Road Championships
1996
8th Overall Critérium International
1997
1st Overall Vuelta a Castilla y León

1st Stage 3 (ITT)

2nd Overall Volta a Catalunya
1998
National Road Championships

1st Road race
3rd Time trial

3rd Overall Vuelta a Burgos
3rd Subida a Urkiola
7th Clásica de San Sebastián
8th Overall Volta a Catalunya
10th Overall Circuit Cycliste Sarthe
1999
National Road Championships

1st Road race
2nd Time trial

3rd Clásica a los Puertos
5th Overall Tour de France
5th Overall Vuelta a Asturias
9th Overall Volta a Catalunya

1st Prologue

9th Overall Euskal Bizikleta
2000
2nd Overall Vuelta a España

Held after Stages 10–12

4th Overall Deutschland Tour
2001
1st Overall Vuelta a España
2002
4th Memorial Manuel Galera
6th Overall Vuelta a España

=== Grand Tour general classification results timeline ===
Grand Tour	1995	1996	1997	1998	1999	2000	2001	2002	2003	2004	2005
Giro d'Italia	—	—	—	—	—	—	—	—	—	—	—
Tour de France	—	—	29	DNF	5	DNF	DNF	—	57	—	—
/ Vuelta a España	13	24	DNF	DNF	DNF	2	1	6	DNF	—	DNF

Legend
—	Did not compete
DNF	Did not finish
