= José Luis Rubiera =

Spanish cyclist (born 1973)

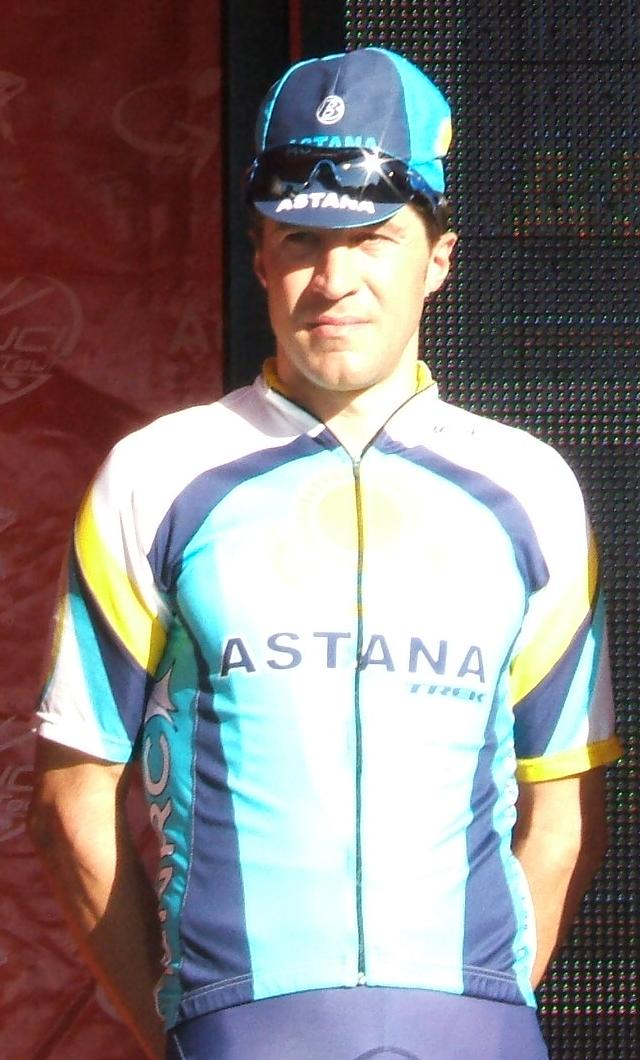

Personal information
- Full name: José Luis Rubiera Vigil
- Nickname: Chechu
- Born: January 27, 1973 (age 53) Gijón, Spain
- Height: 1.80 m (5 ft 11 in)
- Weight: 69 kg (152 lb)

Cycling career
- Sport: Cycling
- Current team: Retired
- Discipline: Road
- Role: Rider

Professional teams
- 1995: Artiach–Chiquilin
- 1996–2000: Kelme–Artiach
- 2001–2007: U.S. Postal Service
- 2008–2009: Astana
- 2010: Team RadioShack

Major wins
- Grand Tours Tour de France 3 TTT stages (2003, 2004, 2005) Giro d'Italia 2 individual stages (1997, 2000)

José Luis Rubiera Vigil (born 27 January 1973 in Gijón) is a Spanish former professional road bicycle racer. He last rode for the UCI ProTour team Team RadioShack. Rubiera won his first professional race at the 1997 Giro d'Italia, winning stage 19. He won another stage in the 2000 Giro d'Italia and was part of three consecutive team time trial (TTT) stage wins in the Tour de France. Rubiera also finished in the top 10 of both the Vuelta a España and Giro d'Italia, on two occasions apiece.

Rubiera's climbing ability was instrumental in leading Lance Armstrong to five of his Tour de France victories, most famously leading Armstrong up the start of Alpe d'Huez in 2001. It was also on this stage that "The Look" incident happened between Armstrong and Jan Ullrich just prior to Armstrong's launch of his attack. In reality, Armstrong was not looking at Ullrich, but rather at Rubiera as he was checking to be sure Rubiera would be there to save him if he cracked and his attack failed.

Rubiera earned an engineering degree in 2004, while balancing his race schedule and studies. Rubiera was elected as deputy to the cyclists' representative council of the UCI ProTour.

== Career achievements ==
=== Major results ===
1997
10th Overall, Giro d'Italia

1st, Stage 19

1999
1st Overall, Volta ao Alentejo

1st, Stage 3b (ITT)

6th Overall, Vuelta a España
2000
1st, Subida al Naranco
8th Overall, Giro d'Italia

1st, Stage 13

2001
2nd Overall, Vuelta a Burgos

1st, King of the Mountains

7th Overall, Vuelta a España
2002
2nd Overall, Vuelta a Burgos
2003
1st, Stage 4 (TTT), Tour de France
2004
1st, Stage 4 (TTT), Tour de France
2nd, Châteauroux Classic
2005
1st, Stage 4 (TTT), Tour de France
3rd Overall, Volta ao Algarve
2006
3rd Overall, Vuelta a Castilla y León
9th Overall, Paris–Nice
10th Overall, Volta ao Algarve
2007
1st, Stage 8, Tour of Qinghai Lake
2008
1st, Stage 2, Vuelta a Murcia
2009
10th Overall, Tour of California
2010
10th Overall, Vuelta a Castilla y León

=== Grand Tour general classification results timeline ===
Grand Tour	1997	1998	1999	2000	2001	2002	2003	2004	2005	2006	2007	2008	2009
Giro d'Italia	10	13	DNF	8	—	—	—	—	—	13	39	15	44
Tour de France	—	—	—	—	38	22	19	19	35	91	—	—	—
Vuelta a España	—	26	6	11	7	51	80	—	—	—	85	22	DNF

Legend
—	Did not compete
DNF	Did not finish
