= Juan Miguel Mercado =

Spanish cyclist

Juan Miguel Mercado-Martin
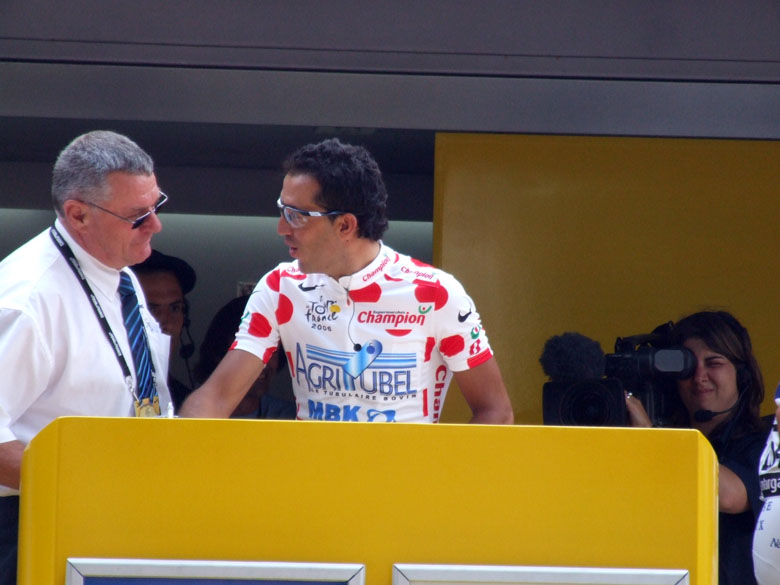
- Mercado signing in at the 2006 Tour de France

Personal information
- Full name: Juan Miguel Mercado-Martin
- Born: July 8, 1978 (age 48) Armilla, Spain

Cycling career
- Sport: Cycling
- Discipline: Road
- Role: Rider
- Rider type: Climbing specialist

Professional teams
- 1998–2000: Vitalicio Seguros
- 2001–2003: iBanesto.com
- 2004–2005: Quick-Step–Davitamon
- 2006–2007: Agritubel

Major wins
- Tour de France, 2 stages Vuelta a España, 1 stage

Juan Miguel Mercado-Martín (born 8 July 1978 in Armilla, Granada) is a Spanish professional road bicycle racer who turned professional with Vitalicio Seguros in 1998. At the Tour de France, Mercado won Stage 18 at the 2004 Tour and captured a surprise win on Stage 10 (the first mountain stage) of the 2006 Tour de France in an early breakaway with Cyril Dessel (Ag2r Prévoyance).

On 19 February 2020, media reports suggested that Mercado was a suspect in a police investigation into a "burglary gang" in the city of Granada.

== Major results ==
1998 – Vitalicio Seguros
1999 – Vitalicio Seguros
2000 – Vitalicio Seguros
2001 – iBanesto.com
Stage win – Vuelta a España
Stage win – Volta ao Alentejo
Overall and Stage win – Vuelta a Burgos
2002 – iBanesto.com
Overall – Setmana Catalana de Ciclisme
Overall and Stage win – Vuelta a Castilla y León
2003 – iBanesto.com
Stage win – Dauphiné Libéré
2004 – Quick Step-Davitamon
Stage 18 win – Tour de France
Stage win – Giro del Trentino
2005 – Quick Step-Innergetic
Overall and Stage win – Tour of Austria
2006 – Agritubel
1st, Stage 10 – Tour de France
