= David Plaza =

Spanish cyclist

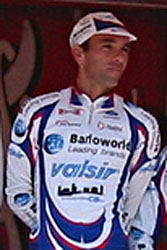

Personal information
- Full name: David Plaza Romero
- Born: 3 July 1970 (age 56) Madrid, Spain

Cycling career
- Sport: Cycling
- Current team: PatoBike–Juquilita
- Discipline: Road
- Role: Rider (retired); Directeur sportif

Professional teams
- 1994–1996: Festina–Lotus
- 1997–1998: Cofidis
- 1999: Benfica
- 2000–2001: Festina
- 2002–2003: Coast
- 2004: Antarte–Rota dos Móveis
- 2004: Cafés Baqué
- 2005: Barloworld

Managerial team
- 2018–: Swapit–Agolíco

David Plaza Romero (born 3 July 1970) is a Spanish former professional road bicycle racer, who competed in the team time trial at the 1992 Summer Olympics. He now works as a directeur sportif for UCI Women's Continental Team PatoBike–Juquilita.

== Major results ==
1991
1st, Overall, Vuelta a la Comunidad de Madrid
1994
1st, Overall, Vuelta a la Comunidad de Madrid
1999
1st, Overall, Volta a Portugal
2000
1st, Overall, Deutschland Tour

1st, Stage 7

2nd, Individual time trial, National Road Championships
2001
1st, Overall, Vuelta de Chile

1st, Stages 6a & 8

1st, Stage 3, Tour de Romandie
