= Team Bianchi =

German cycling team

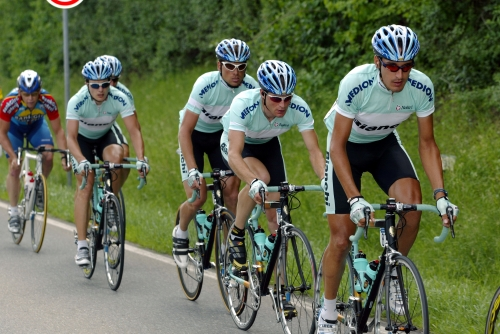

Team information
- UCI code: COA (2000-2003); TBI (2003)
- Registered: Germany
- Founded: 2000
- Disbanded: 2003
- Discipline: Road
- Bicycles: Bianchi

Team name history
- 2000 2001 2002–2003 2003: Team Coast; Team Coast–Buffalo; Team Coast; Team Bianchi

Team Bianchi was a makeshift team that was put together from the remnants of the Coast team in time for the 2003 Tour de France.

Team Coast had been unable to pay the salaries of their riders and Bianchi took over the team and the role of title sponsor. Coast had recently signed Jan Ullrich following his departure from Team Telekom after his drunk driving and amphetamine use. During the 2003 tour while riding for Bianchi, Ullrich placed second to Lance Armstrong by just 61 seconds, his closest ever margin in any of Armstrong's seven victorious years. In the process, Ullrich also managed to upstage Alexander Vinokourov, Telekom's highest-placed rider, who finished third.

Team Bianchi had planned to continue on as a professional road racing team. However, Ullrich's return to his former team Telekom (later T-Mobile and HTC–Highroad), as well as the departure of Ángel Casero led to the demise of Team Bianchi as they now lacked the star power necessary to justify a top-tier team.

== Major wins ==
=== 2000 ===
Grand Prix Pino Cerami, Jan Bratkowski
Stage 12 Tour de Langkawi, Jan Bratkowski

=== 2001 ===
Stage 4 Paris - Nice, Alex Zülle

=== 2003 ===
Profronde Stiphout, Jan Ullrich
Rund um Köln, Jan Ullrich
Stage 1b International Niedersachsen-Rundfahrt, Thorsten Wilhelms
Stage 1 Bayern-Rundfahrt, Thomas Liese
Stage 1 Tour of Austria, Steffen Radochla
Stage 12 Tour de France, Jan Ullrich

== Notable riders ==
Name	Date of birth	Nationality
Stefan Adamsson	03.01.1978	Sweden
Daniel Becke	12.03.1978	Germany
Ángel Casero	27.09.1972	Spain
Félix García Casas	29.12.1968	Spain
Aitor Garmendia	03.03.1968	Spain
Fabrizio Guidi	13.04.1972	Italy
André Korff	04.06.1973	Germany
Francisco José Lara Ruiz	25.02.1977	Spain
Thomas Liese	10.08.1968	Germany
David Plaza Romero	03.07.1970	Spain
Steffen Radochla	19.10.1979	Germany
Thorsten Rund	25.02.1976	Germany
Raphael Schweda	17.04.1976	Germany
Tobias Steinhauser	27.01.1972	Germany
Jan Ullrich	02.12.1973	Germany
Malte Urban	14.12.1974	Germany
Christoph Von Kleinsorgen	14.07.1980	Germany
Thorsten Wilhelms	31.07.1969	Germany
