= 2011 Astana season =

Cycling team season

Astana
- 2011 season
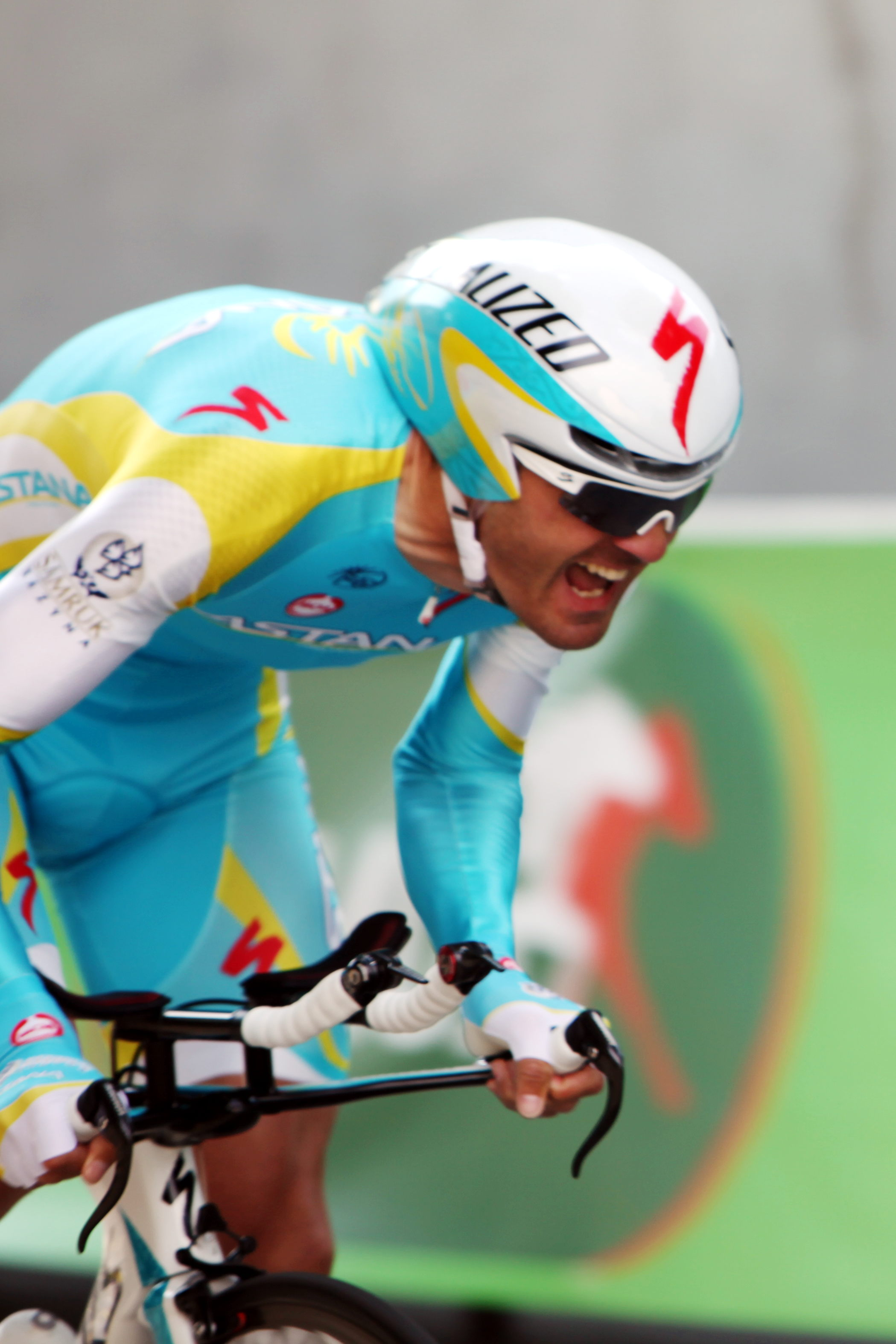
- Gorazd Štangelj at the 2011 Tour de Romandie
- UCI code: AST
- Status: UCI ProTeam
- World Tour Rank: 14th (434 points)
- Manager: Giuseppe Martinelli
- Main sponsor(s): Samruk-Kazyna
- Based: Kazakhstan
- Bicycles: Specialized
- Groupset: SRAM

Season victories
- One-day races: none
- Stage race overall: 2
- Stage race stages: 8
- National Championships: 1
- Most wins: Valentin Iglinsky (3 wins)
- Best ranked rider: Alexander Vinokourov (16th)

The 2011 season for the Astana cycling team began in January at the Tour Down Under and ended in October at the Tour of Hainan. As a UCI ProTeam, they were automatically invited and obligated to send a squad to every event in the UCI World Tour. In a change from the 2010 season, the team's manager was Giuseppe Martinelli, replacing Yvon Sanquer. There was also a major change in ridership, as three-time Tour de France champion Alberto Contador departed for Saxo Bank–SunGard, while his doping case remains unresolved. Three Spanish domestiques followed Contador to Saxo Bank–SunGard, while two climbing talents who spent the previous season with Liquigas–Doimo, Roman Kreuziger and Robert Kišerlovski, were notable additions to the team for 2011.

Alexander Vinokourov was the team's leader alongside Kreuziger. Vinokourov stated before the season that 2011 would likely be his last year as a professional rider. He sustained a serious crash at the Tour de France. He broke his right femur and retired from the sport for a time, but he eventually went back on this decision and his decision from before the season, opting instead to return for the 2012 season.

True to their longtime identity as a stage racing team, all of Astana's 2011 victories came in stage races. They had a much lesser presence at the Grand Tours than they did when Contador rode for them, achieving just one stage win and sixth overall as their best placing, both from the Giro d'Italia. They also took stage wins at seven other races.

== 2011 roster ==
Ages as of January 1, 2011.

Rider	Date of birth
Assan Bazayev (KAZ)	February 22, 1981 (aged 29)
Simon Clarke (AUS)	July 18, 1986 (aged 24)
Allan Davis (AUS)	July 27, 1980 (aged 30)
Rémy Di Gregorio (FRA)	July 31, 1985 (aged 25)
Alexsandr Dyachenko (KAZ)	October 17, 1983 (aged 27)
Dmitry Fofonov (KAZ)	August 15, 1976 (aged 34)
Enrico Gasparotto (ITA)	March 22, 1982 (aged 28)
Maxim Gourov (KAZ)	January 30, 1979 (aged 31)
Dmitriy Gruzdev (Note: Rider joined the team on August 1 as a stagiaire.) (KAZ)	March 13, 1986 (aged 24)
Andriy Hryvko (UKR)	August 7, 1983 (aged 27)
Maxim Iglinsky (KAZ)	April 18, 1981 (aged 29)
Valentin Iglinsky (KAZ)	May 12, 1984 (aged 26)
Josep Jufré (ESP)	August 5, 1975 (aged 35)
Nazar Jumabekov (KAZ)	January 3, 1987 (aged 23)
Tanel Kangert (EST)	March 11, 1987 (aged 23)
Andrey Kashechkin (Note: Kashechkin joined the team on August 5.) (KAZ)	March 21, 1980 (aged 30)
Fredrik Kessiakoff (SWE)	May 17, 1980 (aged 30)

Rider	Date of birth
Roman Kireyev (Note: Kireyev retired from the sport on August 22.) (KAZ)	February 14, 1987 (aged 23)
Robert Kišerlovski (CRO)	August 9, 1986 (aged 24)
Roman Kreuziger (CZE)	May 6, 1986 (aged 24)
Mirco Lorenzetto (ITA)	July 13, 1981 (aged 29)
Francesco Masciarelli (ITA)	May 5, 1986 (aged 24)
Andrey Mizurov (Note: Mizurov joined the team on May 14) (KAZ)	March 16, 1973 (aged 37)
Yevgeniy Nepomnyachshiy (KAZ)	March 12, 1987 (aged 23)
Evgeni Petrov (RUS)	May 25, 1978 (aged 32)
Sergey Renev (KAZ)	January 3, 1985 (aged 25)
Alexandre Shushemoin (KAZ)	February 26, 1987 (aged 23)
Gorazd Štangelj (SLO)	January 27, 1973 (aged 37)
Paolo Tiralongo (ITA)	July 8, 1977 (aged 33)
Ruslan Tleubayev (KAZ)	March 7, 1987 (aged 23)
Tomas Vaitkus (LTU)	February 4, 1982 (aged 28)
Alexander Vinokourov (Note: Vinokourov retired from the sport on July 17, but returned to the team on September 21.) (KAZ)	September 16, 1973 (aged 37)
Andrey Zeits (KAZ)	December 14, 1986 (aged 24)

Riders who joined the team for the 2011 season

Rider	2010 team
Simon Clarke	ISD–NERI
Rémy Di Gregorio	FDJ
Tanel Kangert	ex-pro (Ag2r–La Mondiale, 2009)
Fredrik Kessiakoff	Garmin–Transitions
Robert Kišerlovski	Liquigas–Doimo
Roman Kreuziger	Liquigas–Doimo
Mirco Lorenzetto	Lampre–Farnese
Francesco Masciarelli	Acqua & Sapone
Evgeni Petrov	Team Katusha
Tomas Vaitkus	Team RadioShack

Riders who left the team during or after the 2010 season

Rider	2011 team
Alberto Contador	Saxo Bank–SunGard
Scott Davis	Retired
Valeriy Dmitriyev	None
David de la Fuente	Geox–TMC
Jesús Hernández	Saxo Bank–SunGard
Daniel Navarro	Saxo Bank–SunGard
Benjamín Noval	Saxo Bank–SunGard
Óscar Pereiro	Retired
Bolat Raimbekov	None
Mirko Selvaggi	Vacansoleil–DCM

== One-day races ==
=== Spring classics ===
The squad was not competitive at the first three monument races in the spring season, coming just 66th in Milan–San Remo, 35th at the Tour of Flanders, and 18th at Paris–Roubaix. Kišerlovski and Clarke took seventh places at two early-season classics, respectively the Classica Sarda and the Giro del Friuli, the latter a race run in such difficult conditions that only 25 riders finished.

The team's two leaders Vinokourov and Kreuziger rode strongly at the Ardennes classics. Vinokourov took fourth in La Flèche Wallonne, six seconds back of winner Philippe Gilbert. Kreuziger was also fourth, at the fourth monument Liège–Bastogne–Liège, and also back of Gilbert as race winner. The team also sent squads to the E3 Prijs Vlaanderen – Harelbeke, Gent–Wevelgem, and the Amstel Gold Race, but finished distantly in each, 16th, 66th, and 17th respectively.

=== Fall races ===
Gasparotto turned in a fourth place ride at Tre Valli Varesine, which matched the team's best single-day result of the season, along with the performances of Kreuziger and Vinokourov from earlier in the season. Clarke provided two of the team's highest finishes in the later-season single day races, coming fifth at the Coppa Ugo Agostoni and seventh at Vattenfall Cyclassics. Clarke also turned in a good ride at the Grand Prix Cycliste de Québec, finishing tenth.

The team also sent squads to the Clásica de San Sebastián, the GP Ouest-France, the Grand Prix Cycliste de Montréal, the Coppa Sabatini, the Giro dell'Emilia, the GP Bruno Beghelli, the Giro di Lombardia, the Chrono des Nations, and the Japan Cup, but finished no higher than 17th in any of these races.

== Stage races ==
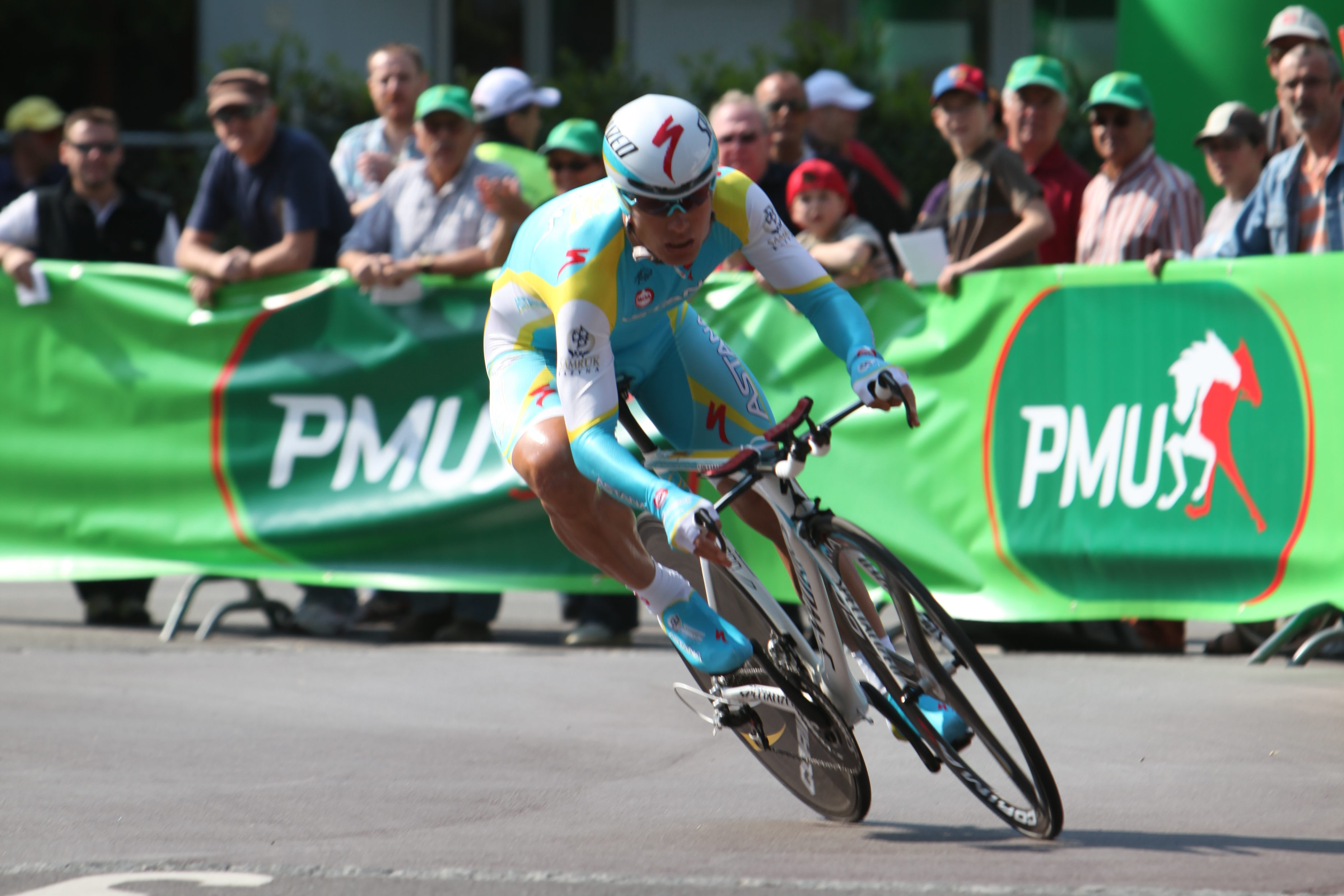
Alexander Vinokourov during the prologue of the 2011 Tour de Romandie.

Di Gregorio took the team's first win of the season, at Paris–Nice, winning a windy, rainy stage 7 into Sophia Antipolis. Vinokourov had targeted this stage, since it fell on the anniversary of the death of his friend Andrei Kivilev in the 2003 race. It was also during this stage that Kiserlovski slid and crashed on a slippery downhill, and skidded underneath a parked truck. It took several minutes to safely extricate him, and after needing eight stitches to sew up his wounds, he did not start the final stage. Vinokourov won stage 3 of the Tour of the Basque Country with a 4 km (2.5 mi) long solo attack. Kreuziger took his first win of the season at the Giro del Trentino, winning the fourth and final stage. He also was first over the day's last two climbs, which gave him enough points to win the mountains classification. The squad also won the teams classification.

Later in April, the team took two wins at two concurrent events. In stage 2 at the Presidential Cycling Tour of Turkey, Valentin took his first win of the season in a field sprint, besting Alessandro Petacchi at the finish. The victory made the younger Iglinsky the race leader for a day before he ceded it to Colnago–CSF Inox's Manuel Belletti, winner of stage 3. Later in the race, Zeits made a fortunate breakaway which took nearly 12 minutes over the rest of the peloton. The result put him fourth in the overall standings, 20 seconds clear of the man in fifth, but 10 minutes ahead of the man in sixth. The next day, the Astana squad worked hard to get another breakaway containing Zeits to the finish line first, which resulted him in moving up to second overall. He retained this position to the conclusion of the race. At the Tour de Romandie, Vinokourov won stage 3. He, Mikaël Cherel, and Tony Martin had slipped off the front of the field when the day's principal breakaway was caught, and stayed away to allow a three-up sprint decide the winner, though they had no appreciable time gap over the fast-charging peloton at the finish. Cherel protested the results, feeling that Vinokourov's sprint had illegally impeded him, but race officials upheld the order of finish on the road. Vinokourov felt after this result that he was a strong contender for the overall crown, sitting 32 seconds back with an individual time trial, where pending race leader Pavel Brutt struggles, still to race. He finished the race third, losing time to race champion Cadel Evans in that time trial. He later said he was satisfied with this performance. However, at this race, Kiserlovski was revealed to have worse injuries from his Paris–Nice crash than first thought. An MRI taken after the Romandie prologue, due to the Croatian suffering from severe shoulder pain, revealed that he had a cracked vertebra. He abandoned the race with hopes of recovering in time for the Giro d'Italia. Vinokourov had a successful Critérium du Dauphiné. He finished second in the prologue time trial and assumed the race lead the next day on the first road race stage. He held the jersey for a second day before losing it in the stage 3 time trial, a considerably longer course than the prologue. He finished a distant 14th, having difficulty on the technical descents on the course, and slipped to fourth overall. When Janez Brajkovič faltered in stage 6, Vinokourov re-assumed a podium position, third, and kept it to the race's conclusion the next day.

The team had a very successful Tour of Austria, a race concurrent to the Tour de France. Kessiakoff rode to a strong stage 2 win on a summit finish at Kitzbüheler Horn. On a day where the composition of the leading group changed several times over rolling terrain, Kessiakoff was the first rider to attack out of the main peloton and surpassed all riders ahead of him to finish alone atop the 1,670 m (5,480 ft) summit. A former mountain bike veteran, this solo ride was Kessiakoff's first career road win in his third year in the discipline. The result gave him a lead of a minute and 18 seconds in the overall standings. After most of the riders finished together on the next four stages, Kessiakoff built his lead even higher in the stage 7 time trial. He was fifth, ceding time only to riders well behind him in the overall standings, extending his lead to two and a half minutes. He easily won the race overall the next day, finishing safely in the peloton in an uncomplicated sprinters' stage. After Masciarelli won the youth award at the inaugural Giro di Padania, Valentin Iglinsky provided for the team's final wins of 2011 at the Tour of Hainan. In a race that actually counted toward the 2012 Asia tour standings, Iglinsky, the race's defending champion, won stage 8 and subsequently the overall crown the next day.

The team also sent squads to the Tour Down Under, the Tour of Qatar, the Tour of Oman, the Volta ao Algarve, the Giro di Sardegna, Tirreno–Adriatico, the Volta a Catalunya, the Tour of Belgium, the Tour de Suisse, the Eneco Tour, and the Tour de l'Ain, but did not have a stage win, classification win, or podium finish in any of them.

== Grand Tours ==
=== Giro d'Italia ===
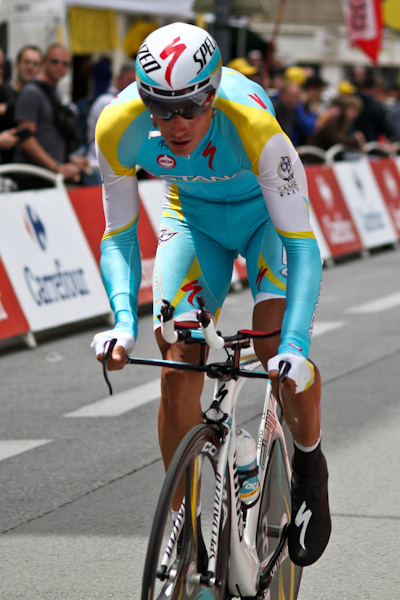
Roman Kreuziger, pictured during the Tour de France later in the year, was Astana's team leader at the Giro d'Italia. Kreuziger finished in sixth place overall – his third Grand Tour top ten finish – and finished as the winner of the young rider classification.

Astana's leader for the Giro was Kreuziger. Though he had ridden six previous Grand Tours and finished in the top ten at the Tour de France twice, this was his first time riding the Giro, as his former team Liquigas–Doimo always inevitably had someone else in mind for leadership at the Italian tour. It was also the first time Kreuziger had ridden as the unquestioned leader in a Grand Tour. Both leadership and access to the Giro were central to Kreuziger's signing with Astana in the offseason. A team of experienced domestiques, along with Kiserlovski, the tenth-place finisher at the 2010 Giro d'Italia, were named to ride in support. Kreuziger's goal was to finish on the podium.

The team began the Giro with a poor team time trial, finishing 17th of 23 teams, immediately putting Kreuziger 50 seconds off the race lead. Kreuziger made each of the day's selections in stage 5, a hilly stage with numerous sectors of unpaved or 'white' roads, and finished with the race's top riders eight seconds back of the day's winner and new race leader Pieter Weening. This result moved Kreuziger up 42 places, from 70th to 18th, even though his time gap to the race leader remained close to the same. Kreuziger took one of the time bonuses two days later on Montevergine di Mercogliano, as the race's top riders narrowly missed taking back the last breakaway rider Bart De Clercq on the Giro's first summit finish. While the Belgian won the stage, Kreuziger's third-place ride moved him further up the classification, to 14th. Kreuziger, like the rest of the field, was greatly outclassed by Alberto Contador on Mount Etna in stage 9, but despite finishing 50 seconds back he vaulted even higher in the standings, entering the top ten overall for the first time, at seventh. He also gained the white jersey for best young rider after this stage. He held that position in stage 11, which unexpectedly became a stage for the overall classification riders despite Contador's hints that he may cede his pink jersey on this day. With Michele Scarponi's Lampre–ISD leading a strong chase, Kreuziger finished sixth on the day, amongst the race's top riders, to remain seventh overall.

Kreuziger, along with most of the race's best riders, was again out-distanced by Contador on the Grossglockner, the next summit finish. He finished sixth on the day, losing over a minute and a half. Attrition to other riders meant he actually moved up to fifth overall, though he was three and a half minutes down on Contador, a time gap unlikely to be recouped. Kreuziger faltered badly the next day on the stage ending at Monte Zoncolan. He was a distant 16th on the day, losing three and a half minutes to stage winner Igor Antón, but more importantly losing between two and three minutes to the race's other top riders. He fell down to ninth overall as a result. He regained one position the next day with ninth place on Gardeccia, but again lost time to the race's other leading riders. This was because Ag2r–La Mondiale rider Hubert Dupont fell from his position above Kreuziger in the standings. Kreuziger finished sixth in the climbing time trial to the Nevegal, but since the climb was relatively short, time gaps among the top riders were small, and he remained eighth overall as a result.

The team took their one-stage win in stage 19. Tiralongo, perhaps Kreuziger's top support rider, attacked out of the leading group 7 km (4.3 mi), all uphill, from the finish in Macugnaga. After other riders tried to bridge up to him but never made it all the way, Contador easily made his way to the front of the race and rode beside Tiralongo for several moments. They shared a few words, and Contador patted the veteran Italian on the back as he encouraged him to take the stage win himself. Tiralongo did so, the first race win of his 12-year career. Contador, who had ridden the last three seasons with Astana, remembered Tiralongo as a friend and a valued support rider, and wanted to do something to thank him for all his hard work done on the Spaniard's behalf. The day was also a good one for Kreuziger, as his eighth place on the day moved him up to seventh overall. Kreuziger was just 16th in the stage 21 time trial in Milan, a poor showing for him. But since José Rujano, the man who had been directly ahead of him in the overall standings, is a vastly inferior time trialist (46th on the day), Kreuziger moved past him to finish the Giro in sixth place overall. While he did fall short of his goal to finish on the podium, Kreuziger nonetheless added another Grand Tour top ten and the best young rider jersey to his palmarès. The squad also finished as winners of the Trofeo Fast Team, the traditional team classification where the times for the team's top three riders are added each day. They finished an even ten minutes the better of Movistar Team.

=== Tour de France ===
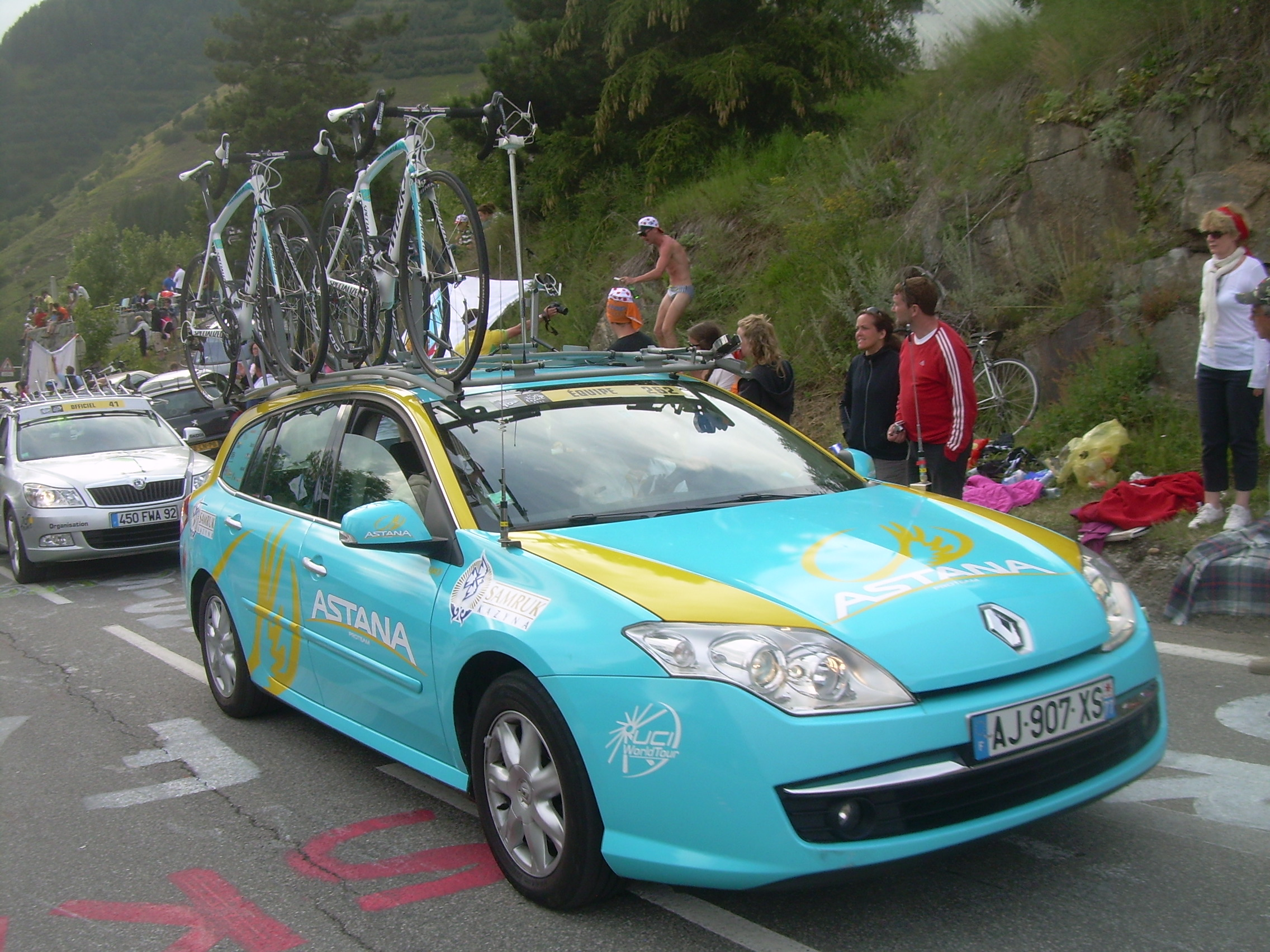
The Astana team car driving up the Alpe d'Huez during stage 19 of the 2011 Tour de France.

Vinokourov led the Astana squad at the Tour de France. Entering 2011, he had thought it to be his final season as an active competitor, and his main goal for the year was to wear the yellow jersey at some time during the Tour. His pursuit of yellow was strengthened by the addition of Kreuziger to the squad, riding solely in support of the veteran Kazakh. Paris–Nice stage winner Di Gregorio and Tiralongo were also named to the squad.

The squad turned in a decent ride in the stage 2 team time trial, finishing ninth of 22 teams. The result installed Vinokourov into 27th place, 32 seconds off the race lead. Vinokourov took third in stage 4 on the Mûr-de-Bretagne, one of only ten riders to finish together at the front of the race. He moved up six places to 18th with this result. In stage 8 on Super Besse, Vinokourov and Team Sky's Juan Antonio Flecha put in an attack that constituted a clear bid to take the yellow jersey. Starting the day 32 seconds back of race leader Thor Hushovd, Vinokourov surged past Flecha and all remaining members of the morning breakaway other than eventual stage winner Rui Costa. He occupied second position on the road, holding a sufficient time gap that he could take the race leadership, until he was reabsorbed by the depleted front peloton and finished at the back of that group. The result did, however, move Vinokourov up to 11th.

The team's fortunes took a dramatic turn the next day. On the same day that breakaway riders Flecha and Johnny Hoogerland were sideswiped by a car at the front of the race, Vinokourov crashed along with Jurgen Van den Broeck, Andreas Klöden, and David Zabriskie, all of whom eventually left the race due to their injuries. Vinokourov's injuries were quite clearly serious immediately – he could not walk back to the road from which he fell, needing to be held up by Di Gregorio and Grivko. He was revealed to have sustained a broken right femur. Fofonov also crashed, witnessing what took place from his position directly behind Vinokourov. He described that the race had been extremely fast, and the road wet, with Hushovd and a rider from Omega Pharma–Lotto taking a line around a left-hand curve that resulted in those behind taking it much too widely and falling off the road. Vinokourov was quoted as saying "I never expected such a dramatic end on the Tour de France" and said that he expected the team to fight on for a stage win. He had surgery in Aurillac the next day, with the scheduled recovery time for the injury ruling him out for the remainder of the season, also meaning that it would likely end his professional career. A week later, Vinokourov indeed announced his retirement from the sport, for a second time. After his first four weeks of rehabilitation went better than anticipated, Vinokourov announced that he would ride the Giro di Lombardia before retiring. Later this plan changed, to have him ride the Chrono des Nations instead, due to the lesser risk of crashing in an individual time trial than in a hilly classic. In September, Vinokourov came out of retirement altogether and announced that he would return as an active rider in 2012.

Despite Vinokourov's hopes upon crashing out of the race that the squad would continue to be combative, they did not attain any noteworthy results over the remainder of the Tour. Grivko and Fofonov took top-ten stage placings from breakaways in stages 16 and 17, but did not come close to winning either day, finishing tenth and sixth respectively and over a minute off the winner's time both days. Vaitkus finished eighth on the Champs-Élysées stage to close out the Tour. The squad's best-placed rider in the final overall standings was Di Gregorio in 39th place, an hour and 22 minutes off Tour winner Cadel Evans' time.

=== Vuelta a España ===
Kashechkin, who previously rode for Astana before being suspended following a positive doping test at the 2007 Tour de France, transferred to the team from Lampre–ISD effective at the beginning of August. His first race back with the team was the Vuelta a España, where he was to ride as squad leader. He hoped to finish in the top five.

Astana turned in their strongest team time trial performance in the Vuelta, finishing fourth of the 22 teams. Kiserlovski commented after the ride that the team was well pleased with fourth place and the small time gap to the stage winners Leopard Trek. Gasparotto had high placings in stages 2 and 3, but did not come especially close to winning either, taking seventh in a field sprint and then ninth over a minute down on the back-to-back days. In the Vuelta's first summit finish the next day in the Sierra Nevada, Kessiakoff finished in the 29-rider leading peloton 11 seconds back of the stage winner, which moved him up to seventh overall. Kashechkin, on the other hand, finished in the second-to-last large group, losing 18 minutes and any chance at serious overall contention. Kessiakoff moved up to sixth the next day by finishing tenth on the Valdepeñas de Jaén climb. After two more tenth places on difficult stages, Kessiakoff's position improved to fourth overall, gaining that position on stage 9. He occupied fifth after stage 11, having slipped a bit in the stage 10 individual time trial, still leaving him to be described as the "big surprise of the Vuelta a España." After 11 stages, Kashechkin lay 107th, nearly an hour and a half behind the race leader. Team manager Martinelli stated that no pressure for a particular final placing would be put on Kessiakoff. Sporting director Aydar Mahmet expressed the team's dissatisfaction with Kashechkin publicly suggesting the expectation of a high placing when he obviously did not have the form to attain it.

Kessiakoff moved into his highest overall position after stage 12, occupying third overall just nine seconds behind the race leader. Kessiakoff at last cracked on stage 14, finishing 21st two minutes off the pace on La Farrapona. He had such time in hand over the bulk of the field, however, that he slipped only to sixth overall. Kessiakoff badly cracked in the next stage, losing almost 22 minutes and falling to 26th overall. Kiserlovski then became the team's top overall rider. He took ninth on stage 18 into Noja, part of a breakaway that took over seven minutes against the race's top riders. The result installed him into 16th place overall. He ended the Vuelta in 18th, as Astana's best-placed rider. Kessiakoff's final position was 34th, and Kashechkin was 89th.

== Season victories ==
Date	Race	Competition	Rider	Country	Location
March 12	Paris–Nice, Stage 7	UCI World Tour	Rémy Di Gregorio (FRA)	France	Biot
April 6	Tour of the Basque Country, Stage 3	UCI World Tour	Alexander Vinokourov (KAZ)	Spain	Zuia
April 22	Giro del Trentino, Stage 4	UCI Europe Tour	Roman Kreuziger (CZE)	Italy	Madonna di Campiglio
April 22	Giro del Trentino, Mountains classification	UCI Europe Tour	Roman Kreuziger (CZE)	Italy	
April 22	Giro del Trentino, Teams classification	UCI Europe Tour	(Note: The riders on the squad were Roman Kreuziger, Paolo Tiralongo, Francesco Masciarelli, Evgeni Petrov, Robert Kišerlovski, Gorazd Štangelj, Maxim Gourov, and Josep Jufré)	Italy	
April 25	Tour of Turkey, Stage 2	UCI Europe Tour	Valentin Iglinsky (KAZ)	Turkey	Turgutreis
April 29	Tour de Romandie, Stage 3	UCI World Tour	Alexander Vinokourov (KAZ)	Switzerland	Neuchâtel
May 27	Giro d'Italia, Stage 19	UCI World Tour	Paolo Tiralongo (ITA)	Italy	Macugnaga
May 29	Giro d'Italia, Youth classification	UCI World Tour	Roman Kreuziger (CZE)	Italy	
May 29	Giro d'Italia, Trofeo Fast Team	UCI World Tour	(Note: The riders on the squad were Roman Kreuziger, Paolo Tiralongo, Francesco Masciarelli, Robert Kišerlovski, Maxim Gourov, Josep Jufré, Alexsandr Dyachenko, Evgeni Petrov, and Gorazd Štangelj)	Italy	
July 4	Tour of Austria, Stage 2	UCI Europe Tour	Fredrik Kessiakoff (SWE)	Austria	Kitzbüheler Horn
July 10	Tour of Austria, Overall	UCI Europe Tour	Fredrik Kessiakoff (SWE)	Austria	
July 10	Tour of Austria, Teams classification	UCI Europe Tour	(Note: The riders on the squad were Fredrik Kessiakoff, Josep Jufré, Tanel Kangert, Roman Kireyev, Robert Kišerlovski, Andrey Mizurov, Yevgeniy Nepomnyachshiy, and Simon Clarke)	Austria	
September 10	Giro di Padania, Youth classification	UCI Europe Tour	Francesco Masciarelli (ITA)	Italy	
October 27	Tour of Hainan, Stage 8	UCI Asia Tour	Valentin Iglinsky (KAZ)	China	Sanya
October 28	Tour of Hainan, Overall	UCI Asia Tour	Valentin Iglinsky (KAZ)	China	
