= 2010 Astana season =

Astana
- 2010 season
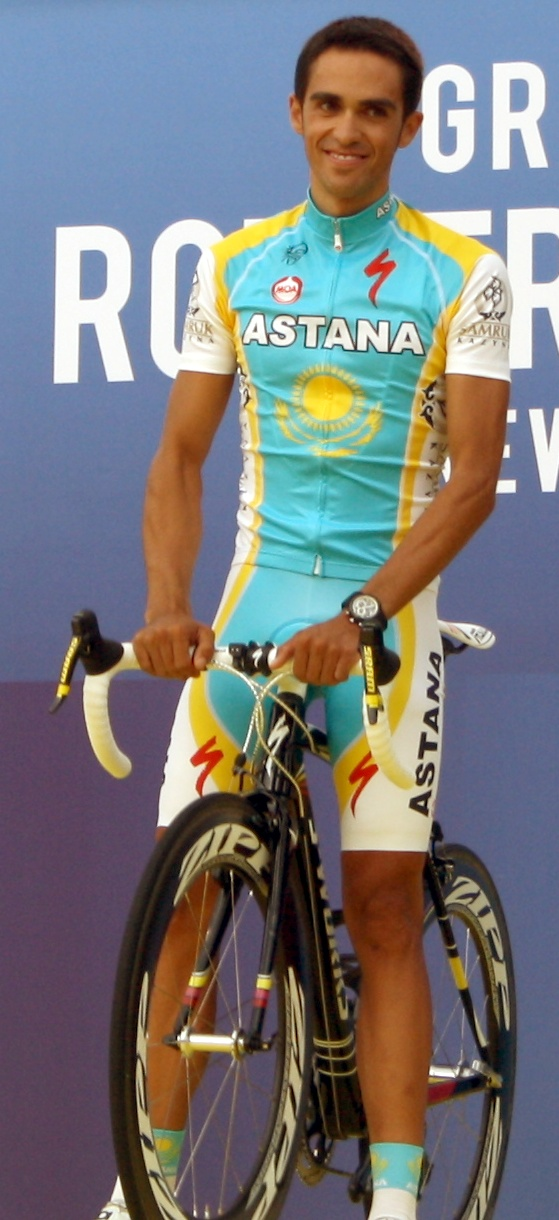
- Alberto Contador at the 2010 Tour de France team presentation.
- UCI code: AST
- Status: UCI ProTour team
- World Ranking: 8th (768 points)
- Manager: Yvon Sanquer
- Main sponsor(s): Samruk-Kazyna
- Based: Kazakhstan
- Bicycles: Specialized
- Groupset: SRAM?

Season victories
- One-day races: 2
- Stage race overall: 4 (Note: Alberto Contador's victory in the 2010 Tour de France has been officially revoked.)
- Stage race stages: 10
- Grand Tours: none (Note: Alberto Contador's victory in the 2010 Tour de France has been officially revoked.)
- National Championships: 2
- Most wins: Alberto Contador (8 wins) (Note: Alberto Contador's victory in the 2010 Tour de France has been officially revoked.)
- Best ranked rider: Alexander Vinokourov (11th)

The 2010 season for the Astana cycling team began in January with the Tour Down Under and ended in October at the Giro di Lombardia. As a UCI ProTour team, they were automatically invited and obligated to send a squad to every ProTour event.

Astana's 2010 season marked a great transition for the team, as went from the leadership of Johan Bruyneel to Yvon Sanquer. The team similarly saw many notable riders depart, including Lance Armstrong, Levi Leipheimer, Andreas Klöden, and the rest of Astana's squad from the 2009 Tour de France save champion Alberto Contador. Most of these riders were part of Armstrong's new team in 2010, Team RadioShack. Contador and Alexander Vinokourov, who returned from suspension late in the 2009 season, were the team's leaders in 2010.

== 2010 team roster ==
Ages as of January 1, 2010

Rider	Date of birth
Assan Bazayev (KAZ)	February 22, 1981 (aged 28)
Alberto Contador (ESP)	December 6, 1982 (aged 27)
Allan Davis (AUS)	July 27, 1980 (aged 29)
Scott Davis (AUS)	April 22, 1979 (aged 30)
David de la Fuente (ESP)	May 4, 1981 (aged 28)
Valeriy Dmitriyev (KAZ)	October 10, 1984 (aged 25)
Alexsandr Dyachenko (KAZ)	October 17, 1983 (aged 26)
Dmitry Fofonov (KAZ)	August 15, 1976 (aged 33)
Enrico Gasparotto (ITA)	March 22, 1982 (aged 27)
Maxim Gourov (KAZ)	January 30, 1979 (aged 30)
Jesús Hernández (ESP)	September 28, 1981 (aged 28)
Andriy Hryvko (UKR)	August 7, 1983 (aged 26)
Maxim Iglinskiy (KAZ)	April 18, 1981 (aged 28)
Valentin Iglinskiy (KAZ)	May 12, 1984 (aged 25)

Rider	Date of birth
Josep Jufré (ESP)	August 5, 1975 (aged 34)
Roman Kireyev (KAZ)	February 14, 1987 (aged 22)
Daniel Navarro (ESP)	July 8, 1983 (aged 26)
Yevgeniy Nepomnyachshiy (KAZ)	March 12, 1987 (aged 22)
Benjamín Noval (ESP)	January 23, 1979 (aged 30)
Óscar Pereiro (ESP)	August 3, 1977 (aged 32)
Bolat Raimbekov (KAZ)	December 25, 1986 (aged 23)
Sergey Renev (KAZ)	January 3, 1985 (aged 24)
Mirko Selvaggi (ITA)	February 11, 1985 (aged 24)
Gorazd Štangelj (SLO)	January 27, 1973 (aged 36)
Paolo Tiralongo (ITA)	July 8, 1977 (aged 32)
Alexander Vinokourov (KAZ)	September 16, 1973 (aged 36)
Andrey Zeits (KAZ)	December 14, 1986 (aged 23)

Riders who joined the team for the 2010 season

Rider	2009 team
Allan Davis	Quick-Step
Scott Davis	Fly V Australia
David de la Fuente	Fuji–Servetto
Dmitry Fofonov	ex-pro (Crédit Agricole, 2008)
Enrico Gasparotto	Lampre–NGC
Maxim Gourov	Carmiooro A Style
Andriy Hryvko	ISD–NERI
Valentin Iglinskiy	neo-pro
Yevgeniy Nepomnyachshiy	
Óscar Pereiro	Caisse d'Epargne
Mirko Selvaggi	Amica Chips–Knauf
Gorazd Štangelj	Liquigas–Doimo
Paolo Tiralongo	Lampre–NGC
Alexander Vinokourov	ex-pro (Astana, 2007)

Riders who left the team during or after the 2009 season

Rider	2010 team
Lance Armstrong	Team RadioShack
Janez Brajkovič	Team RadioShack
Chris Horner	Team RadioShack
Andreas Klöden	Team RadioShack
Levi Leipheimer	Team RadioShack
Steve Morabito	BMC Racing Team
Dmitriy Muravyev	Team RadioShack
Sérgio Paulinho	Team RadioShack
Yaroslav Popovych	Team RadioShack
Grégory Rast	Team RadioShack
José Luis Rubiera	Team RadioShack
Michael Schär	BMC Racing Team
Tomas Vaitkus	Team RadioShack
Haimar Zubeldia	Team RadioShack

== One-day races ==
=== Spring classics ===
Maxim Iglinskiy won Montepaschi Strade Bianche in March, a rare spring season one-day win in the team's history. He made his race-winning move against breakaway companions Thomas Lövkvist and Michael Rogers 200 m (660 ft) from the finish line, as the road narrowed. He and Lövkvist nearly touched shoulders and crashed, but both held their lines and stayed upright. Iglinskiy, who had never ridden this particular race before, called it "the most beautiful win of [his] career."

== Stage races ==
Contador scored the team's first victory of 2010 in the Volta ao Algarve, a mountain stage which finished at Malhão. The victory also gave him the race's overall leadership. A solid second place in the event's closing individual time trial meant Contador retained the lead through the conclusion of the race.

== Grand Tours ==
=== Giro d'Italia ===
Vinokourov made the Giro an early goal for himself, announcing in December that he would ride it in 2010 for the first time in his career. He was the team leader, as Contador mounted only a defense of his Tour crown in 2010 and not a return to the Giro or the Vuelta. He stated that his goal was to wear the race leader's pink jersey for one day, and not to win the race overall. The team showed well in the stage 1 time trial in Amsterdam. Hryvko was one of the earliest riders to take the course and set a time that stood as best for much of the day. Later, Vinokourov turned in a fourth-place ride, five seconds off the winning time set by Team Sky's Bradley Wiggins. Over the next two days, many crashes took place and kept very small the number of riders together in the leading group at the stages finishes. Vinokourov was able to stay with the leaders both days, and was one of the only overall favorites to do so. In so doing, he earned the pink jersey as the race transferred to Italy. Their fortunes were turned in the stage 4 team time trial, however. Valentin Iglinskiy, Dyachenko, and Gasparotto fell off the pace early in their ride, as did Kireyev with 3 kilometers left. This left only the minimum of five riders together, and in the last kilometer, Štangelj also fell off, and the remaining team members had to wait for him at the finish line. This lost time cost Vinokourov the pink jersey, as Vincenzo Nibali took it.

Stage 7 was long and hilly, and run partially on unpaved roads. It also happened to be run on a day with very heavy rain, making the final kilometers of the course muddy and treacherous. After the overall contenders had stayed together for most of the stage, Nibali crashed on the first section of unpaved roads and needed a bike change. Vinokourov took the opportunity to put in an attack, and he and three others finished together well ahead of Nibali, giving Vinokourov the pink jersey again. Though he had prospered on the stage, Vinokourov openly questioned afterwards whether such terrain should be used in a multi-day event.

After three stages won by sprinters and breakaways, the overall standings were again shuffled in stage 11. This was the Giro's longest stage, and was again run on a very rainy day. In this stage, a group of approximately 50 riders broke away and gained considerable time on the peloton. Their biggest advantage was 20 minutes, and 40 of them were still together ahead of the peloton at the end of the stage, with the winner Evgeni Petrov still 13 minutes ahead. The teams of the overall contenders had been leading a chase until the day's last climb, when the chase stopped altogether and the time gap remained the same the rest of the way. Astana was one of the only teams who did not have a rider finish ahead of the peloton, and the result was Vinokourov again losing the pink jersey, this time to Richie Porte.

Vinokourov finished in the top ten in several of the stages in the Giro's second half. Much as he did in stage 7, he made a selective break in a counterattack in stage 12, finishing fourth. He finished alone between the first and second groups in the stage finish at Monte Grappa, moving back into the top ten overall, ninth, with this result. On Monte Zoncolan, Vinokourov rode in the red points jersey to fifth on the day, moving up to sixth overall. He was eighth in the climbing time trial to Plan de Corones and finished with the second group on the road, for fourth, in stage 19 which featured the Passo del Mortirolo. He posted the third-best time in the time trial which closed out the Giro, in Verona. Vinokourov finished the Giro sixth overall. Astana was 14th in the Trofeo Fast Team standings and ninth in the Trofeo Super Team.

=== Tour de France ===
Two-time and defending champion Contador was one of the riders frequently cited as a major favorite to win the Tour de France. Contador was sixth in the prologue time trial, positioning himself near prospective rivals and his former teammates Lance Armstrong and Levi Leipheimer despite the short, flat course not particularly favoring Contador's strengths. Contador and Vinokourov both limited their losses well in stage 3, which incorporated numerous sectors of cobblestones at the Belgium-France border. Vinokourov was tenth on the day, finishing with the second group 53 seconds back of the stage winner. Contador had been with this group for most of the cobbled sections, but he flatted towards the finish and lost a further 20 seconds. Nonetheless, both riders occupied spots in the top ten after the stage, Vinokourov in eighth and Contador in ninth. After three stages decided by field sprints, the medium mountain seventh stage to Station des Rousses in the Jura began to sort out the overall standings. Vinokourov, Contador, and all serious overall contenders finished together on the same time. They moved up to fifth and sixth overall as some sprinters who were still highly placed because of the Tour's flat first week fell from the top of the standings. In the first Alpine stage the next day, the race's elite (with the notable exception of Lance Armstrong) contested the stage as the first group on the road. Andy Schleck and Samuel Sánchez attacked within the stage's final kilometer and gained 10 seconds against the other overall favorites, including Contador, with Schleck winning the stage. Contador moved up to third overall with the day's results. In the next stage, after the first rest day, Contador and Schleck made a move which ensured that they would finish in the top two spots on the podium at the end of the race. On the Col de la Madeleine, an hors catégorie climb (and the fourth of the day), the two broke away from the race's other overall contenders. They met and bridged up to Jens Voigt, a member of the morning escape, who paced them (on Schleck's behalf) to a sizeable gap over the peloton they had left behind. Though Sánchez also gained time against this group, the day's results put Schleck in first and Contador in second with more than two minutes between Contador and Sánchez in third, all but assuring that one of them would be Tour champion.

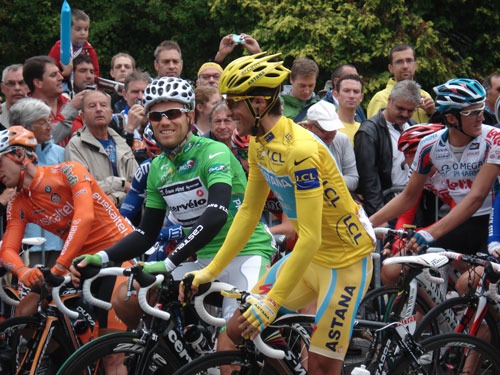
Contador wearing the yellow jersey during the 17th stage of the Tour de France.

In stage 12 three days later, it seemed that Vinokourov put in a winning attack on the stage's final climb, Mende. But Contador put in an attack from the trailing peloton, something which is not normally done by the teammate of a race's solo leader. Contador drew with him Joaquim Rodríguez, and they easily rode past Vinokourov. Rodríguez won the sprint while Contador took back ten seconds on Schleck. Vinokourov finished third, 4 seconds behind Rodríguez. He was later visibly furious that his teammate's move had denied him a stage win. The next day, Vinokourov took his stage win, coming home 13 seconds ahead of the peloton with a late attack, denying the sprinters that finished at the head of the main field. After the race's elite finished together in stage 14, controversy ensued in stage 15. While climbing the Port de Balès, the chain on Schleck's bicycle slipped. It was at this exact moment that Contador made an attack, and Schleck could not answer due to his mechanical trouble. He took back 39 seconds on the stage, which gave him the yellow jersey. He was roundly booed by sections of the crowd when taking the jersey, though some commentators also spoke out on his behalf in regards to the incident. For his part, Schleck was at first very angry with Contador but later said that he forgave him, though he did not forget. Contador's advantage over Schleck was at this point only eight seconds, and there remained an extremely difficult mountain stage and an individual time trial.

Schleck and Contador easily distinguished themselves as the two strongest riders in stage 17, which ended at the Col du Tourmalet. They took a lead of over a minute against the race's other contenders. In the final few kilometers of the stage, Schleck repeatedly tried to drop Contador from his wheel to make up the time he needed to regain the yellow jersey, but Contador stayed with him. At the end, Contador did not try to sprint for the stage win, keeping the yellow jersey while Schleck took his second stage win. In the stage 19 time trial, a drastic change in wind direction as the day went on meant that early starters had considerably better times than the race's top riders. Contador was 35th on the stage, nearly six minutes down on the day's winner Fabian Cancellara, but he extended his lead over Schleck to 39 seconds – the exact amount of time he had gained as a result of the Luxembourger's mechanical incident on the Port de Balès. They finished in those positions after the Tour's largely ceremonial finale the next day, giving Contador his third Tour victory in as many participations, albeit his first without a stage win. The squad finished sixth in the teams classification.

==== Alberto Contador clenbuterol positive ====
In September 2010, Contador revealed that a urine sample he had given on July 21, a rest day in the Tour de France, had contained traces of clenbuterol. He has stated, due to the number of other tests he passed and that only a tiny amount of the substance was detected in the one he failed, that food contamination was to blame. Renowned anti-doping doctor Don Catlin considered this explanation plausible. Contador stated that he is the victim, and he can "hold his head high" and that he thinks he should not be punished. Several people related to the sport said that there is little benefit from using the drug, especially in the amounts that were discovered.

The UCI issued a statement reporting that the concentration was 50 picograms per millilitre, and that this was 400 times below the minimum standards of detection capability required by WADA, and that further scientific investigation would be required. Contador has been provisionally suspended from competition, although this had no short-term effect as he had already finished his racing programme for the 2010 season. Contador had been informed of the results over a month earlier, on August 24. Later the amount discovered was clarified as 40 times below the minimum standards, rather than the 400 times originally reported by the UCI. Contador's scientific adviser claimed that he would have needed 180 times the amount detected to gain any benefit in his performance. Contador nonetheless stands to be suspended from the sport and have his Tour title stripped, depending on the outcome of the case.

The matter remained unresolved throughout 2011, and therefore past Contador's association with the Astana team, as he signed with Saxo Bank–SunGard for 2011. On 6 February 2012, Contador was given a backdated two-year ban and stripped of both his 2010 Tour win for Astana, and the 2011 Giro d'Italia win for Saxo Bank–SunGard.

=== Vuelta a España ===
Astana entered the Vuelta without a serious overall contender. Pereiro was supposed to ride as squad leader, but had, after the Tour of Poland been feeling pain in his right arm that he said related back to his career threatening crash in the 2008 Tour de France. The injury kept him from training and it further required surgery to remove a lump between the metacarpal bones in his right hand. Pereiro attempted a faith-healing cure as well as conventional treatment, but did not take the Vuelta's start in Seville, essentially hastening his retirement.

The squad was 20th in the team time trial which kicked off the race, finishing better than only the small Spanish teams Andalucía–Cajasur and Footon–Servetto–Fuji. In stage 6, Davis made the day's selections and contested the sprint at the head of the 70-strong group that finished together after covering the day's hills. He was fourth on the day, finishing behind Thor Hushovd, Daniele Bennati, and Grega Bole. Bazayev was part of the morning breakaway in stage 8, and held on for eighth on the day as the race's top riders chased the break down. Davis figured into a further two mass sprint finishes, coming home seventh in stage 12 and third in stage 21, but that was as close as the team came to any victories. The team's highest-placed rider in the final overall standings was Jufré in 24th, at a deficit of almost 33 minutes to Vuelta champion Vincenzo Nibali. The squad finished 12th in the teams classification.

== Season victories ==
Date	Race	Competition	Rider	Country	Location
February 19	Volta ao Algarve, Stage 3	UCI Europe Tour	Alberto Contador (ESP)	Portugal	Malhão
February 21	Volta ao Algarve, Overall	UCI Europe Tour	Alberto Contador (ESP)	Portugal	
March 6	Montepaschi Strade Bianche	UCI Europe Tour	Maxim Iglinskiy (KAZ)	Italy	Siena
March 11	Paris–Nice, Stage 4	UCI World Ranking	Alberto Contador (ESP)	France	Mende
March 14	Paris–Nice, Overall	UCI World Ranking	Alberto Contador (ESP)	France	
March 14	Tirreno–Adriatico, Stage 5	UCI World Ranking	Enrico Gasparotto (ITA)	Italy	Colmurano
April 1	Three Days of De Panne, Sprint classification	UCI Europe Tour	Andriy Hryvko (UKR)	Belgium	
April 17	Vuelta a Castilla y León, Stage 4	UCI Europe Tour	Alberto Contador (ESP)	Spain	Ponferrada
April 18	Vuelta a Castilla y León, Overall	UCI Europe Tour	Alberto Contador (ESP)	Spain	
April 18	Vuelta a Castilla y León, Combination classification	UCI Europe Tour	Alberto Contador (ESP)	Spain	
April 20	Giro del Trentino, Stage 1	UCI Europe Tour	Alexander Vinokourov (KAZ)	Italy	Torbole sul Garda
April 23	Giro del Trentino, Overall	UCI Europe Tour	Alexander Vinokourov (KAZ)	Italy	
April 25	Liège–Bastogne–Liège	UCI World Ranking	Alexander Vinokourov (KAZ)	Belgium	Liège
June 6	Critérium du Dauphiné, Prologue	UCI World Ranking	Alberto Contador (ESP)	France	Évian-les-Bains
June 11	Critérium du Dauphiné, Stage 5	UCI World Ranking	Daniel Navarro (ESP)	France	Grenoble
June 12	Critérium du Dauphiné, Stage 6	UCI World Ranking	Alberto Contador (ESP)	France	Alpe d'Huez
June 13	Critérium du Dauphiné, Points classification	UCI World Ranking	Alberto Contador (ESP)	France	
July 17	Tour de France, Stage 13	UCI World Ranking	Alexander Vinokourov (KAZ)	France	Revel
August 7	Tour de Pologne, Points classification	UCI World Ranking	Allan Davis (AUS)	Poland	
October 12	Tour of Hainan, Stage 2	UCI Asia Tour	Valentin Iglinskiy (KAZ)	China	Wuzhishan
October 19	Tour of Hainan, Overall	UCI Asia Tour	Valentin Iglinskiy (KAZ)	China	
October 19	Tour of Hainan, Points classification	UCI Asia Tour	Valentin Iglinskiy (KAZ)	China	

=== Victory originally obtained by Contador but vacated ===
Date	Race	Competition	Country	Location
July 25	Tour de France, Overall	UCI World Ranking	France	
