= 2003 Paris–Nice =

Race details
- Dates: 9–16 March 2003
- Stages: 7 + Prologue
- Distance: 901.8 km (560.4 mi)
- Winning time: 23h 30' 04"

Results
Jersey awarded to the overall winner	Winner	Alexander Vinokourov (KAZ)	(Team Telekom)
	Second	Mikel Zarrabeitia (ESP)	(ONCE–Eroski)
	Third	Davide Rebellin (ITA)	(Gerolsteiner)

The 2003 Paris–Nice was the 61st edition of the Paris–Nice cycle race and was held from 9 March to 16 March 2003. The race started in Issy-les-Moulineaux and finished in Nice. The race was won by Alexander Vinokourov of the Telekom team.

Andrey Kivilev (Cofidis), fourth in the 2001 Tour de France, crashed heavily during stage 2. He was taken to hospital with severe head injuries and placed in a coma. An emergency surgery was conducted the same night, but Kivilev died in the early morning of 12 March 2003. Following his death, calls to make the wearing of crash helmets compulsory in professional cycling increased. Less than a month later, the sport's governing body, the Union Cycliste Internationale, declared helmets mandatory for all UCI-sanctioned events.

== Teams ==
Twenty teams, containing a total of 158 riders, participated in the race:

- Team Telekom
- FDJeux.com
- Quick-Step–Davitamon
- Kelme–Costa Blanca
- Saeco
- Cofidis
- Fassa Bortolo
- Brioches La Boulangère
- U.S. Postal Service
- Gerolsteiner
- ONCE–Eroski
- Phonak
- Crédit Agricole
- Lotto–Domo
- Team CSC
- AG2R Prévoyance
- Jean Delatour
- Euskaltel–Euskadi
- Team Fakta
- Milaneza–MSS

== Route ==
Stage characteristics and winners
Stage	Date	Course	Distance	Type	Winner
P	9 March	Issy-les-Moulineaux	4.8 km (3.0 mi)	Individual time trial	Nico Mattan (BEL)
1	10 March	Auxerre to Paray-le-Monial	191 km (119 mi)		Alessandro Petacchi (ITA)
2	11 March	La Clayette to Saint-Étienne	182.5 km (113.4 mi)		Davide Rebellin (ITA)
3	12 March	Le Puy-en-Velay to Pont du Gard	192.5 km (119.6 mi)		Stage neutralised
4	13 March	Vergèze to Vergèze	16.5 km (10.3 mi)	Individual time trial	Dario Frigo (ITA)
5	14 March	Aix-en-Provence to Mont Faron	152.5 km (94.8 mi)		Alexander Vinokourov (KAZ)
6	15 March	Toulon to Cannes	194.5 km (120.9 mi)		Joaquim Rodríguez (ESP)
7	16 March	Nice to Nice	160 km (99 mi)		David Bernabeu (ESP)

== General classification ==
Final general classification

Rank	Rider	Team	Time
1	Alexander Vinokourov (KAZ)	Team Telekom	23h 30' 04"
2	Mikel Zarrabeitia (ESP)	ONCE–Eroski	+ 43"
3	Davide Rebellin (ITA)	Gerolsteiner	+ 54"
4	Jörg Jaksche (GER)	ONCE–Eroski	+ 55"
5	Sylvain Chavanel (FRA)	Brioches La Boulangère	+ 1' 24"
6	David Bernabeu (ESP)	Milaneza–MSS	+ 1' 28"
7	Claus Michael Møller (DEN)	Milaneza–MSS	+ 1' 30"
8	Volodymyr Gustov (UKR)	Fassa Bortolo	+ 1' 41"
9	Samuel Sánchez (ESP)	Euskaltel–Euskadi	+ 1' 48"
10	Óscar Pereiro (ESP)	Phonak	+ 2' 04"
