= 2002 Paris–Nice =

Race details
- Dates: 10–17 March 2002
- Stages: 7 + Prologue
- Distance: 1,193.7 km (741.7 mi)
- Winning time: 30h 39' 27"

Results
Jersey awarded to the overall winner	Winner	Alexander Vinokourov (KAZ)	(Team Telekom)
	Second	Sandy Casar (FRA)	(Française des Jeux)
	Third	Laurent Jalabert (FRA)	(CSC–Tiscali)

The 2002 Paris–Nice was the 60th edition of the Paris–Nice cycle race and was held from 10 March to 17 March 2002. The race started in Issy-les-Moulineaux and finished in Nice. The race was won by Alexander Vinokourov of the Telekom team.

== Teams ==
Twenty-one teams, containing a total of 167 riders, participated in the race:

- Tacconi Sport
- Lotto–Adecco
- Cofidis
- CSC–Tiscali
- Team Telekom
- Crédit Agricole
- ONCE–Eroski
- Fassa Bortolo
- Bonjour
- Domo–Farm Frites
- Jean Delatour
- Euskaltel–Euskadi
- Team Coast
- iBanesto.com
- AG2R Prévoyance
- Kelme–Costa Blanca
- Française des Jeux
- Mapei–Quick-Step
- Phonak
- Alessio
- BigMat–Auber 93

== Route ==
Stage characteristics and winners
Stage	Date	Course	Distance	Type	Winner
P	10 March	Issy-les-Moulineaux	5.2 km (3.2 mi)	Individual time trial	László Bodrogi (HUN)
1	11 March	Blois to Saint-Amand-Montrond	176 km (109 mi)		Alessandro Petacchi (ITA)
2	12 March	Moulins to Belleville	170 km (110 mi)		Robbie McEwen (AUS)
3	13 March	Saint-Étienne to Saint-Étienne	147 km (91 mi)		Laurent Jalabert (FRA)
4	14 March	Pertuis to Mont Faron	175 km (109 mi)		Alexander Vinokourov (KAZ)
5	15 March	Toulon to Cannes	188.5 km (117.1 mi)		Alessandro Petacchi (ITA)
6	16 March	Saint-Raphaël to Col d'Èze	175 km (109 mi)		Dario Frigo (ITA)
7	17 March	Nice to Nice	157 km (98 mi)		Robbie McEwen (AUS)

== General classification ==
Final general classification

Rank	Rider	Team	Time
1	Alexander Vinokourov (KAZ)	Team Telekom	30h 39' 27"
2	Sandy Casar (FRA)	Française des Jeux	+ 55"
3	Laurent Jalabert (FRA)	CSC–Tiscali	+ 57"
4	Andrey Kivilev (KAZ)	Cofidis	+ 59"
5	Aitor Garmendia (ESP)	Team Coast	+ 1' 23"
6	Jens Voigt (GER)	Crédit Agricole	+ 1' 38"
7	Didier Rous (FRA)	Bonjour	+ 1' 40"
8	Dario Frigo (ITA)	Tacconi Sport	+ 1' 44"
9	Mario Aerts (BEL)	Lotto–Adecco	+ 1' 44"
10	Cadel Evans (AUS)	Mapei–Quick-Step	+ 2' 17"
