= 2003 Tour de Suisse =

Race details
- Dates: 16–25 June 2003
- Stages: 9 + Prologue
- Distance: 1,444 km (897.3 mi)
- Winning time: 36h 38' 58"

Results
	Winner	Alexander Vinokourov (KAZ)	(Team Telekom)
	Second	Giuseppe Guerini (ITA)	(Team Telekom)
	Third	Óscar Pereiro (ESP)	(Phonak)

The 2003 Tour de Suisse was the 67th edition of the Tour de Suisse cycle race and was held from 16 June to 25 June 2003. The race started in Egerkingen and finished in Aarau. The race was won by Alexander Vinokourov of the Telekom team.

== Teams ==
Seventeen teams of up to eight riders started the race:

- Phonak
- AG2R Prévoyance
- Crédit Agricole
- Team Bianchi
- Team CSC
- De Nardi–Colpack
- Fassa Bortolo
- FDJeux.com
- Gerolsteiner
- Lampre
- Lotto–Domo
- Palmans–Collstrop
- Quick-Step–Davitamon
- Saeco
- Team Telekom
- Vini Caldirola–So.di
- CCC–Polsat

== Route ==
Stage characteristics and winners
Stage	Date	Course	Distance	Type	Winner
P	16 June	Egerkingen	6.5 km (4.0 mi)	Individual time trial	Fabian Cancellara (SUI)
1	17 June	Egerkingen to Le Locle	163 km (101.3 mi)	Hilly stage	Alexander Vinokourov (KAZ)
2	18 June	Murten to Nyon	175 km (108.7 mi)	Hilly stage	Robbie McEwen (AUS)
3	19 June	Nyon to Saas-Fee	217 km (134.8 mi)	Mountain stage	Francesco Casagrande (ITA)
4	20 June	Visp to Losone	168 km (104.4 mi)	Mountain stage	Sandy Casar (FRA)
5	21 June	Ascona to La Punt	177.8 km (110.5 mi)	Mountain stage	Francesco Casagrande (ITA)
6	22 June	Silvaplana to Silvaplana	135 km (84 mi)	Mountain stage	Óscar Pereiro (ESP)
7	23 June	Savognin to Oberstaufen (Germany)	231 km (143.5 mi)	Hilly stage	Sergei Yakovlev (KAZ)
8	24 June	Gossau to Gossau	32.5 km (20.2 mi)	Individual time trial	Bradley McGee (AUS)
9	25 June	Stäfa to Aarau	152 km (94.4 mi)	Flat stage	Baden Cooke (AUS)

== General classification ==
Final general classification

Rank	Rider	Team	Time
1	Alexander Vinokourov (KAZ)	Team Telekom	36h 38' 58"
2	Giuseppe Guerini (ITA)	Team Telekom	+ 1' 14"
3	Óscar Pereiro (ESP)	Phonak	+ 1' 28"
4	Kim Kirchen (LUX)	Fassa Bortolo	+ 1' 46"
5	Tadej Valjavec (SLO)	Fassa Bortolo	+ 1' 55"
6	Alexandre Moos (SUI)	Phonak	+ 2' 10"
7	Jan Ullrich (GER)	Team Bianchi	+ 2' 27"
8	Sven Montgomery (SUI)	Fassa Bortolo	+ 2' 29"
9	Ondřej Sosenka (CZE)	CCC–Polsat	+ 4' 14"
10	Tomasz Brożyna (POL)	CCC–Polsat	+ 6' 17"
