= 2006 Vuelta a Castilla y León =

Race details
- Dates: 20 March–24 March 2006
- Stages: 5
- Distance: 643.2 km (399.7 mi)
- Winning time: 16h 35' 12"

Results
	Winner	Alexander Vinokourov (KAZ)
	Second	Luis León Sánchez (ESP)
	Third	José Luis Rubiera (ESP)

The 2006 Vuelta a Castilla y León was the 21st edition of the Vuelta a Castilla y León cycle race and was held on 20 March to 24 March 2006. The race started in Valladolid and finished in Segovia. The race was won by Alexander Vinokourov.

== Teams ==
Fifteen teams of up to eight riders started the race:

- Caisse d'Epargne–Illes Balears
- Comunidad Valenciana
- Viña Magna–Cropu
- Discovery Channel
- Liberty Seguros–Würth
- Saunier Duval–Prodir
- Euskaltel–Euskadi
- 3 Molinos Resort
- Chocolade Jacques–Topsport Vlaanderen
- Kaiku
- Grupo Nicolás Mateos
- Relax–GAM
- Andalucía–Paul Versan
- Massi
- Unibet.com

== General classification ==
Final general classification

Rank	Rider	Time
1	Alexander Vinokourov (KAZ)	16h 35' 12"
2	Luis León Sánchez (ESP)	+ 21"
3	José Luis Rubiera (ESP)	+ 26"
4	Egoi Martínez (ESP)	+ 1' 08"
5	José Azevedo (POR)	+ 1' 12"
6	Michele Scarponi (ITA)	+ 1' 21"
7	Gustavo César (ESP)	+ 1' 24"
8	Francisco Pérez (ESP)	+ 1' 29"
9	Janez Brajkovič (SLO)	s.t.
10	Haimar Zubeldia (ESP)	+ 1' 45"
