= Bolat Raimbekov =

Kazakhstani cyclist

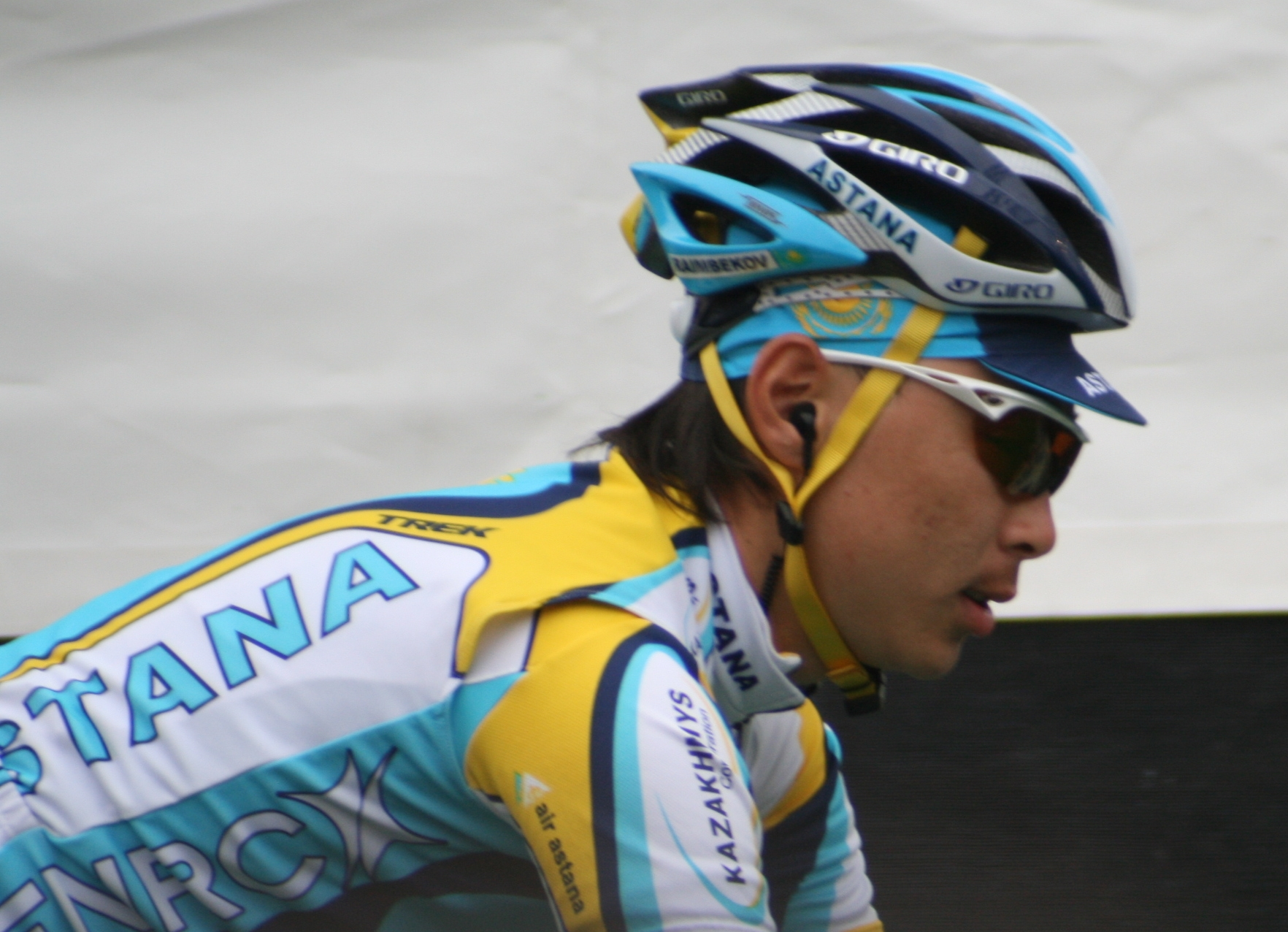
- Bolat Raimbekov at 2009 Tour of Flanders

Personal information
- Born: December 25, 1986 (age 39)

Cycling career
- Sport: Cycling
- Current team: Unattached
- Discipline: Road
- Role: Rider

Professional teams
- 2008: Ulan
- 2009–2010: Astana

Bolat Raimbekov (born 25 December 1986) is a Kazakhstani road bicycle racer, last for Astana of the UCI ProTour.
