= Alexander Vinokourov =

Kazakhstani road bicycle racer (born 1973)

Alexander Vinokourov Алексaндр Винокуров
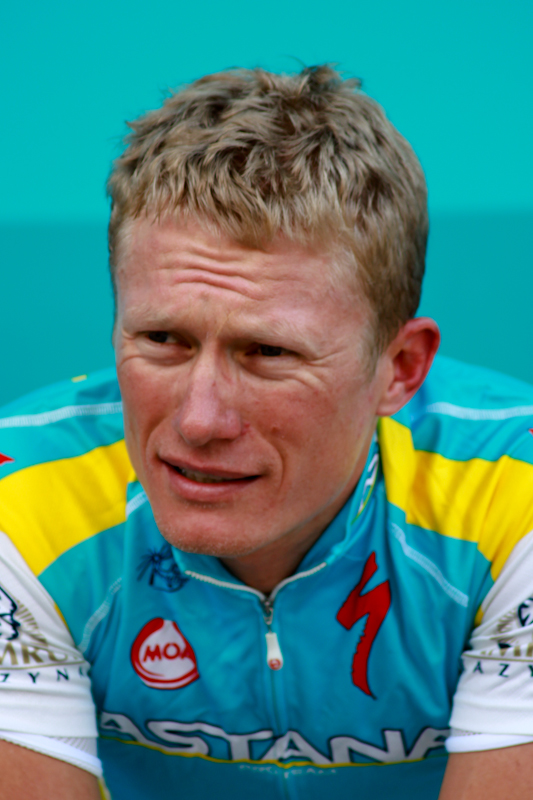
- Vinokourov at the 2011 Tour de Romandie in Switzerland

Personal information
- Full name: Alexander Nikolaivich Vinokourov; Алексaндр Николаевич Винокуров
- Nickname: Vino
- Born: 16 September 1973 (age 53) Petropavl, Kazakh SSR, Soviet Union
- Height: 1.76 m (5 ft 9 1/2 in)
- Weight: 69 kg (152 lb; 10 st 12 lb)

Cycling career
- Sport: Cycling
- Current team: XDS Astana Team
- Discipline: Road
- Role: Rider (retired); General manager
- Rider type: All-rounder

Amateur team
- 1997: EC Saint-Étienne Loire

Professional teams
- 1998–1999: Casino–Ag2r
- 2000–2005: Team Telekom
- 2006: Liberty Seguros–Würth
- 2007: Astana
- 2009–2012: Astana

Managerial team
- 2013–: Astana

Major wins
- Grand Tours Tour de France 4 individual stages (2003, 2005, 2010) Combativity award (2003) Vuelta a España General classification (2006) Combination classification (2006) 4 individual stages (2000, 2006) Stage races Critérium du Dauphiné Libéré (1999) Paris–Nice (2002, 2003) Tour de Suisse (2003) Deutschland Tour (2001) Giro del Trentino (2010) One-day races and Classics Olympic Games Road Race (2012) National Road Race Championships (2005) Liège–Bastogne–Liège (2005, 2010) Amstel Gold Race (2003)
Medal record
Representing Kazakhstan
Men's road bicycle racing
Olympic Games
Gold medal – first place	2012 London	Road Race
Silver medal – second place	2000 Sydney	Road Race
UCI Road World Championships
Bronze medal – third place	2004 Verona	Individual Time Trial
Bronze medal – third place	2006 Salzburg	Individual Time Trial
Asian Games
Gold medal – first place	1994 Hiroshima	Team Time Trial
Silver medal – second place	1994 Hiroshima	Road Race
Silver medal – second place	2002 Busan	Road Race
Asian Cycling Championships
Gold medal – first place	2009 Tenggarong	Individual Time Trial
Silver medal – second place	2009 Tenggarong	Road Race

Alexander Nikolayevich Vinokourov (Kazakh and Russian: Александр Николаевич Винокуров; born 16 September 1973) is a Kazakhstani former professional road bicycle racer and the current general manager of UCI WorldTeam XDS Astana Team. As a competitor, his achievements include two bronze medals at the World Championships, four stage wins in the Tour de France, four in the Vuelta a España plus the overall title in 2006, two Liège–Bastogne–Liège monuments, one Amstel Gold Race, and the gold medal at the 2012 London Olympics Men's Road Race. Vinokourov is a past national champion of Kazakhstan, and a dual-medalist at the Summer Olympics. In 2007, he received a two-year ban from cycling for blood doping. In 2019, he was accused of race fixing by prosecutors in Liège but was later cleared of the charges.

Vinokourov began cycling in 1984 as an 11-year-old, competing within the former Soviet Union. He moved to France in 1997 to finish his amateur career, and then turned professional there in 1998. After almost a decade as a professional, Vinokourov was caught blood doping during the 2007 Tour de France, which triggered the withdrawal of the entire Astana team from that year's race. After a 2-year suspension from competition, he returned to cycling in August 2009, riding first for the national team of Kazakhstan and then rejoining Astana. A serious crash during the 2011 Tour de France threatened to prematurely end Vinokourov's career for a second time, but he announced he would continue for one more season in 2012 – with an eye towards competing in the Olympic Games in London. There, Vinokourov played the role of ultimate spoiler when he dramatically won the gold medal in the men's road race after breaking away in the closing miles with Colombian Rigoberto Urán.

Vinokourov retired after the Olympics and assumed management duties with Astana for 2013. He was sacked as the team principal of Astana-Premier Tech in June 2021. However, in August 2021 Vinokourov returned as Team manager. He is an honorary colonel in the Kazakh army but lives in France with his wife and children.

== Racing career ==
=== 1984–1996: Early amateur career ===
According to his father, Nikolay, Vinokourov began cycling at age 11 when he joined a branch of the Petropavl's Children and Youth Sports School. The Frenchman Vincent Lavenu, who would later offer Vinokourov his first professional contract, reported that the young Kazakhstani was training on the road every day at age 11, and also competing in cyclo-cross. In 1986 at age 13, Vinokourov became an athlete at a sports school in Almaty, then the capital of Kazakhstan, where he would train for the next five years. While fulfilling his compulsory two-year military service requirement, he also trained as part of the Soviet national team. Like some other top cyclists, he trained in Southern California during the winter months.

After Kazakhstan declared independence from the Soviet Union on 16 December 1991, Vinokourov continued to train and race, though as a member of the Kazakhstani national team. He placed third behind Pascal Hervé of France in the Regio Tour amateur stage race in Germany in 1993 (Vinokourov later would win this race as a professional in 2004). Other notable performances during these early years include winning two stages at the 1995 Tour of Ecuador and the overall GC at the 1996 Tour of Slovenia. Vinokourov also competed in the 1996 Olympic Games in Atlanta, where he finished 53rd in the men's road race – an event he won 16 years later.

=== 1997: Amateur career at Espoir cycliste St-Etienne Loire ===
In the winter of 1996, Gilles Mas, directeur sportif of the Agrigel-La Creuse team, received a letter from the coach of the Kazakhstani national team, inquiring about the possibility of placing six Kazakhstani cyclists in European professional teams. Mas agreed to take on the best two, but only on condition they first rode for the amateur Espoir Cycliste Saint-Étienne Loire (ECSEL) club for a year. Mas and Pierre Rivory of ECSEL chose Andrey Mizurov and Vinokourov.

Vinokourov arrived in France on 22 March 1997, after a sub-par performance due to illness in the Tour de Langkawi as a member of Kazakhstan's national team. While he readily adapted to Europe, Mizurov – who had won the inaugural time trial in the 1997 Tour de Langkawi – struggled with homesickness and contemplated a return to Kazakhstan. Ultimately, in May 1997, Mizurov was replaced by Vinokourov's former classmate Andrei Kivilev, who was then racing with an amateur team in Burgos in Spain after having placed 29th in the previous year's Olympic road race. Mizurov would later turn professional in 1999 with Collstrop–De Federale Verzekeringen, and he reunited with Vinokourov in 2007 at Astana.

Vinokourov came second in a stage of the Tour of Auvergne two weeks after he arrived in Europe, and was best climber in a Coupe de France race a week later. Then, during a trial for the Casino professional team at the Tour of Saône et Loire, he won three of the four stages. In total, Vinokourov would win ten races for his amateur club, leading Vincent Lavenu to offer him a two-year professional contract to ride for Casino in 1998–1999.

=== 1998–2002 ===
Vinokourov won six races in 1998, his first year as a professional, including the Four Days of Dunkirk, the Tour de l'Oise, and stages in both the Tour of Poland and Circuit des Mines. In early 1999, he won the Volta a la Comunitat Valenciana stage race, and three months later took two stages of the Midi Libre. Vinokourov also won the Critérium du Dauphiné Libéré, beating the American Jonathan Vaughters along the way. (He lost the yellow jersey to Vaughters after the Mont Ventoux time trial but regained it on the following mountain stage.)

In 2000, Vinokourov joined Team Telekom. He won the combination competition in Paris–Nice and finished third in the Critérium International. He came 15th in the Tour de France after working for captain Jan Ullrich. His first win for the German team was stage 18 in the Vuelta a España, in which he caught the two riders in the breakaway and sprinted past Roberto Laiseka and Vicente Garcia Acosta in the last 300 metres. He came second several weeks later in the Olympic Games behind Ullrich and in front of another Telekom teammate, Andreas Klöden.

Vinokourov time-trialed to a stage win in the 2001 Deutschland Tour and took the yellow jersey from his Telekom teammate Erik Zabel. The dominance of the Telekom team was evident the following day when Rolf Aldag won and Vinokourov gained a minute and a half over the peloton to ensure victory. He rode the Tour de France that year in support of Ullrich, where he finished 16th overall.

Vinokourov won Paris–Nice in 2002, taking the leader's jersey after attacking Laurent Jalabert and Andrei Kivilev on Mont Faron. The penultimate stage to the Col d'Eze, a mountaintop finish, Vinokourov kept his lead and won Paris–Nice the following day. Later in 2002, he won the first mountain stage in the Tour de Suisse but several stages later he fell on a mountain descent and was taken to hospital after the stage. Vino abandoned the race to prepare for the Tour but it was discovered two weeks later that he had a broken coccyx and could not ride the 2002 Tour de France.

=== 2003–2005 ===
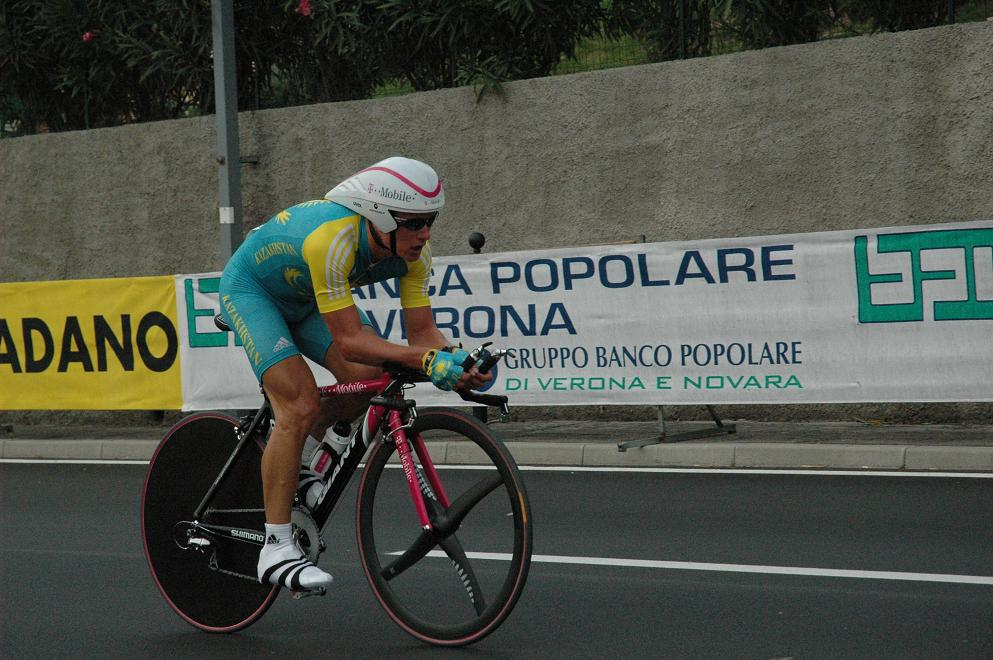
Vinokourov races 2004 Worlds TT.

2003 would be a breakthrough year for Vinokourov, but one marred by an early-season personal tragedy that nevertheless drove him to perform inspirationally. His close friend Andrei Kivilev fell heavily during the second stage of Paris–Nice, slipped into a coma, and died during the night. The loss of his compatriot weighed heavily on Vinokourov, but he rallied and declared that he was more motivated than ever to win. Stage three had been neutralized and stage four was a time trial, but on stage five, which featured the race's only mountaintop finish, Vinokourov honoured his late-friend with a spectacular attack on Mont Faron that won him the stage and the leader's jersey. As he crossed the line, Vinokourov pointed skyward, and later explained to the press:

Most of all, [it's a victory for] for Andrei Kivilev. He wanted to win on Mont Faron and also Paris–Nice. I really gave everything for this victory, and today was a coup double, for him and for his family. I found the strength to continue the race, only for him, for his family, for his little boy. I'm satisfied today for myself and for them. I'm going to do everything to keep the jersey, and for that I found a double strength, myself and his strength as well. It's fantastic, and I'm very happy. For sure it's a victory for him, and I hope to keep the jersey until Nice.

Two days later, Vinokourov won Paris–Nice and in a final gesture to his friend, he displayed a photograph of Kivilev on the podium.

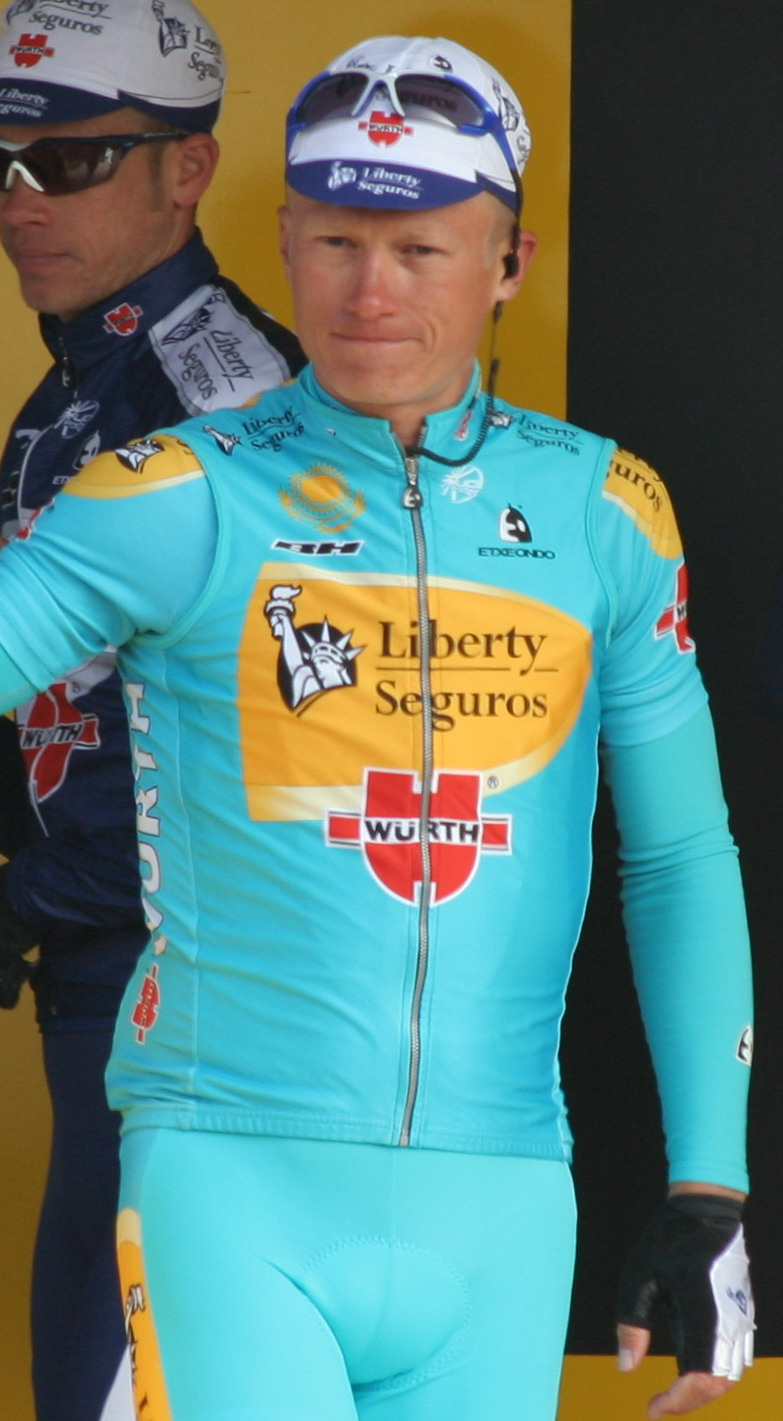
Vinokourov at 2006 Liège–Bastogne–Liège.

Forty days later, after the traditional period for mourning in Kazakhstan, Vinokourov won the Amstel Gold Race. He had reached the leading group with 10 kilometres to go, and attacked them at the 5 km banner. Vinokourov built an advantage of 15 seconds that he fought to maintain up the steep Cauberg finishing climb, winning by four seconds ahead of Michael Boogerd.

Vinokourov attacked on the flat first stage of the 2003 Tour de Suisse and only the Russian Serguei Ivanov could match him. Vinokourov won the stage and took the lead. Francesco Casagrande dropped Vinokourov on the first mountain stage and closed the gap to six seconds. Casagrande attacked again on the following mountain stage and took the jersey. But Casagrande cracked several days later in an individual time trial as Vinokourov finished fifth to retake the jersey and win the race.

Vinokourov was for the first time riding to win in the 2003 Tour de France. He was to share this role in his team with the Colombian Santiago Botero. Vinokourov finished second on the stage to the l'Alpe d'Huez. He attacked the following day on the final climb 9 km from the finish and won the stage. He moved into second overall, 21 seconds short of Lance Armstrong. Several days later in the individual time trial, won by Ullrich, Vinokourov took third position and kept it to the end. He was voted the most combative rider.

Vinokourov missed the break on the second stage of the 2004 Paris–Nice that gained five minutes, but he won three stages. He attacked towards the end of a small climb on the fifth stage with 8 km to go. He built ten seconds and won by four seconds. He dedicated the win to Kivilev. Vinokourov attacked the lead group on the flat windy coastal road in the finale of stage 7, with 5 km to go. He caught and passed Samuel Sánchez with 2 km to go and won the stage. Vinokourov won the final stage in a breakaway sprint against Denis Menchov.

Vinokourov came third in Liège–Bastogne–Liège, behind Davide Rebellin and Michael Boogerd. Boogerd and Vinokourov had been matching each other while Rebellin waited for the sprint and won. Vinokourov crashed on the second stage of the Tour de Suisse, tearing ligaments in his shoulder. That stopped him riding the 2004 Tour de France.

He returned for the Regio Tour at the start of August. In the second stage, he won the time trial. In the following stage, he won the bunch sprint and took the leader's jersey to win. He then rode the Vuelta a España but due to food poisoning lost time during the first week. Vinokourov recovered and finished fourth in the time trial. He rode the world championship and took the bronze medal in the time trial.

Vinokourov's first win in 2005 and the first for the team was Liège–Bastogne–Liège. He broke away with Jens Voigt with more than 50 km to go. Vinokourov attacked on the final short climb 6 km from the finish but could not get away from Voigt. Instead he waited and beat Voigt in the sprint. In the Dauphiné Libéré, Vinokourov won the stage on Mont Ventoux. He had attacked the favourites for the Tour de France, reaching the breakaway before attacking at several hundred metres on the uphill finish to win the stage. Vinokourov travelled back to Kazakhstan to win the national championship ahead of Mizourov and Kashechkin.

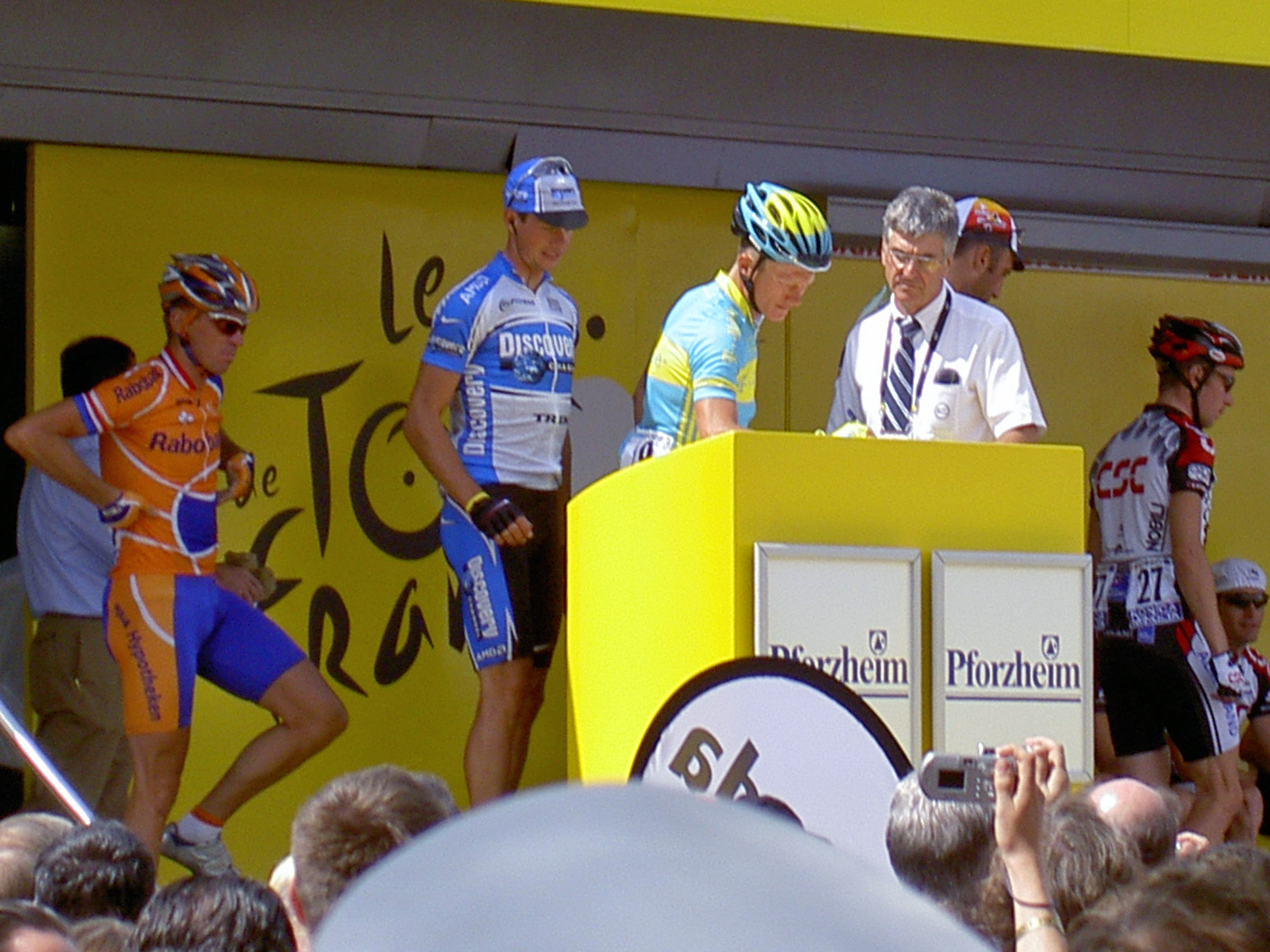
Vinokourov at the 2005 Tour de France sign-in, in Pforzheim.

Vinokourov said in July 2005 that he was in as good condition as 2003, when he came third. Vinokourov said he was riding "for the team". The implication was that he would be leader if he or Andreas Klöden (second in 2004) rode better than Ullrich. Vinokourov came third in the opening time trial, beating Ullrich and Klöden by 15 seconds and 1:08. The American Lance Armstrong followed Vinokourov's attacks on stage 8 but let Klöden go. Vinokourov rode separately from his teammates, bringing speculation regarding Ullrich's role in the team.

Vinokourov lost time in the mountains. Revenge came when he won stage 11 in a break, outsprinting Santiago Botero.

Tension between Vinokourov and his team boiled on stage 14 into the Pyrenees where Vinokourov was dropped. He chased for 20 km and then attacked, but Kloden and Ullrich reeled him in, bringing criticism of T-Mobile's tactics which were apparently just to support Ullrich. Vinokourov settled his differences when he won stage 21 to Paris.

After 3rd place in the time trial in the penultimate stage, losing time to only Armstrong and Ullrich, Vinokourov moved to 6th, trailing Levi Leipheimer in 5th by two seconds. The final stage, usually a formality, became a showdown between Vinokourov and Leipheimer. A sprint prime with time bonuses came at 75 km in Châteny-Malabry. Leipheimer and his Gerolsteiner team came to the front. Leipheimer needed to prevent Vinokourov from getting it. Gerolsteiner set a fast tempo to discourage Vinokourov. But 1.5 km from the sprint, Vinokourov attacked. Soon only Leipheimer could hold his wheel, but he was not able to pass and so Vinokourov gained six seconds, Leipheimer four. Leipheimer was ahead only by a fraction of a second. When they reached Paris officials stopped the clock due to dangerous conditions (the cobblestone road was wet and slippery from rain), and the final sprint prime was cancelled.

Leipheimer said he was informed that normal bonus time for 1st, 2nd and 3rd place on the stage would also not be awarded. He and others thought Leipheimer had 5th place. In the final kilometers, several riders broke clear but were caught. Then, as the pace was increasing, Vinokourov moved to the front. With 2 km remaining, Laurent Brochard attacked and Vinokourov jumped on his wheel. A few seconds later Brad McGee closed the gap. When Brochard cracked, McGee moved to the front, but Vinokourov followed. They achieved a gap that could not be closed. McGee zigged and zagged, making Vinokourov work, but Vinokourov found enough power to pull around McGee and win.

That was victory made of courage and guts – I really gave it all in the last kilometres, although I didn't think it was possible until I crossed the line. I just went 'à bloc' – it's unbelievable, magnificent! I have no words for it...I did think a lot about Kivilev yesterday in St. Etienne, and I think that motivated me even more. I'm very happy to win.

Tour officials awarded time bonuses after all, so Vinokourov gained 20 seconds to put him into 5th place. As his contract with T-Mobile was up in 2005, many speculated on which team he would join, and whether it would give him full support in 2006. The team turned out to be Manolo Saiz's Liberty Seguros–Würth team.

=== 2006–2007 ===
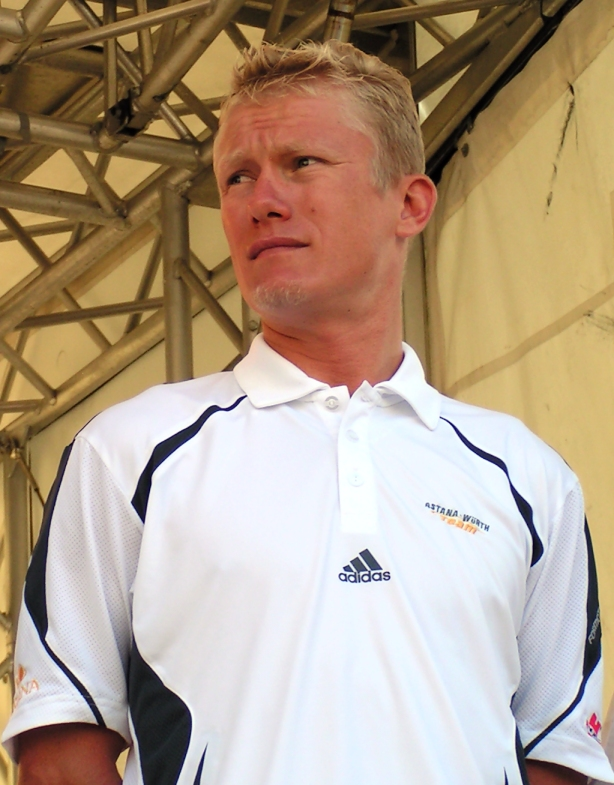
Vinokourov at the team presentation for the 2006 Deutschland Tour in Düsseldorf, Germany

Liberty Seguros withdrew sponsorship on 25 May 2006 after the arrest of Manolo Saiz relating to blood doping. A coalition of companies from Kazakhstan took over sponsorship, now called Astana–Würth. On 30 June 2006, Astana-Würth withdrew from the 2006 Tour de France after five riders were implicated in the Operación Puerto doping case, leaving Vinokourov, one of the favorites, with three teammates, below the required six riders. Vinokourov was never accused or implicated.

In the Vuelta a España, the team was known simply as Astana after Würth departed sponsorship. After losing time in the first mountains, Vinokourov went into attack. He lost the 7th stage to Alejandro Valverde, took revenge by winning the 8th and 9th stages and climbed to 5th place at the end of the first week. After a good time trial, and aggressive climbing on stages 17 & 18 (stage 18 was won by Kashechkin), Vinokourov took first place and claimed the gold jersey from Valverde. After a strong time trial, his 3rd stage victory, Vinokourov won the Vuelta.

Following his one and only Grand Tour victory at the Vuelta, Vinokourov rode to a podium finish at the World Championships TT in Salzburg, where he took third behind winner Fabian Cancellara of Switzerland, and the American runner-up, David Zabriskie – both of Team CSC. Vino dropped his chain in the middle of the 15 percent climb, but in his typical laconic manner brushed-off the mishap, explaining:

I had a hard time putting it back on, but the time I lost only counted for second or third place, so it wasn't that important. Now, I'll concentrate on the road race, for which I'm really motivated.

Vinokourov started the 2007 Tour de France as a definite "Yellow jersey favourite," with a new team backed by the same Kazakh sponsors who had taken over Liberty Seguros in 2006 – Astana. The Tour started well when he placed 7th in the London prologue, losing only 30 seconds to time-trial specialist Fabian Cancellara. He was ranked inside the top 10 through the second stage, and he remained in contention for the overall until the fifth stage, when he experienced a misfortune. As the peloton accelerated before the final climb, Vinokourov fell heavily at high speed and tumbled into a ditch with 25k to go. He suffered severe cuts and abrasions to both knees and elbows, and serious bruising to his right buttock. The wounded Kazakh could be seen standing on the left side of the road, gesticulating while a frantic teammate struggled to fix his leader's damaged bike.

The main field did not slow to allow Vinokourov to reintegrate with the bunch, but instead raced on towards the finish in Autun. He remounted and began to chase, calling back seven of his eight teammates to help his bid to regain the leaders. The Astana train pursued the favorites, until Vinokourov himself surged ahead of his companions and led the last wave of the chase. When he crossed the line, he finished 1–20 behind his main rivals, all of whom arrived together.

After the dramatic crash and the serious injuries, he lost time in the Alps and was dismissed from the list of GC contenders.

But despite his injuries, and after seemingly being written off by the press and his rivals, Vinokourov rallied and won the first individual time trial by 1:14 from Cadel Evans. He explained:

I am happy with my performance, I am finding my legs again. Now I want to attack in the Pyrénées. I want to thank everyone in and around the team that encouraged me to get through the Alps.

He also won stage 15, a mountain stage finishing in Loudenvielle.

=== Blood doping suspension ===
The next day (24 July) Vinokourov failed a doping control following his time trial victory. His blood had a double population of erythrocytes, which implied a homologous transfusion. He delivered a positive for blood doping on 24 July 2007.

As a result, his Astana team pulled out after being requested to withdraw by ASO president Patrice Clerc.

Vinokourov's B sample came back positive a few days later, and Cadel Evans was declared winner of stage 13. Vinokourov was stripped of his stage 15 victory, which was awarded to Kim Kirchen of Luxembourg. According to Phil Liggett, long-time commentator for the Tour, "It is incomprehensible that Vinokourov could do such a thing when he must have known he was under suspicion because of his dealing with disgraced doctor Michele Ferrari in Italy. He must have known he would be tested at every opportunity, and the time trial was the perfect occasion."

Vinokourov received a one-year suspension from the Kazakhstan Cycling Federation. The UCI was angered by the short ban—a lighter sentence than those received by other cyclists found guilty, such as Tyler Hamilton and Ivan Basso—which would allow him to ride in the 2008 Beijing Olympics. His team Astana then threatened to sue Vinokourov for damages, as did Cadel Evans and team Predictor–Lotto, due to the publicity they lost for Evans not being named the winner at the time of the stage.

In December 2007, Vinokourov announced his retirement.

=== 2009–2010 ===
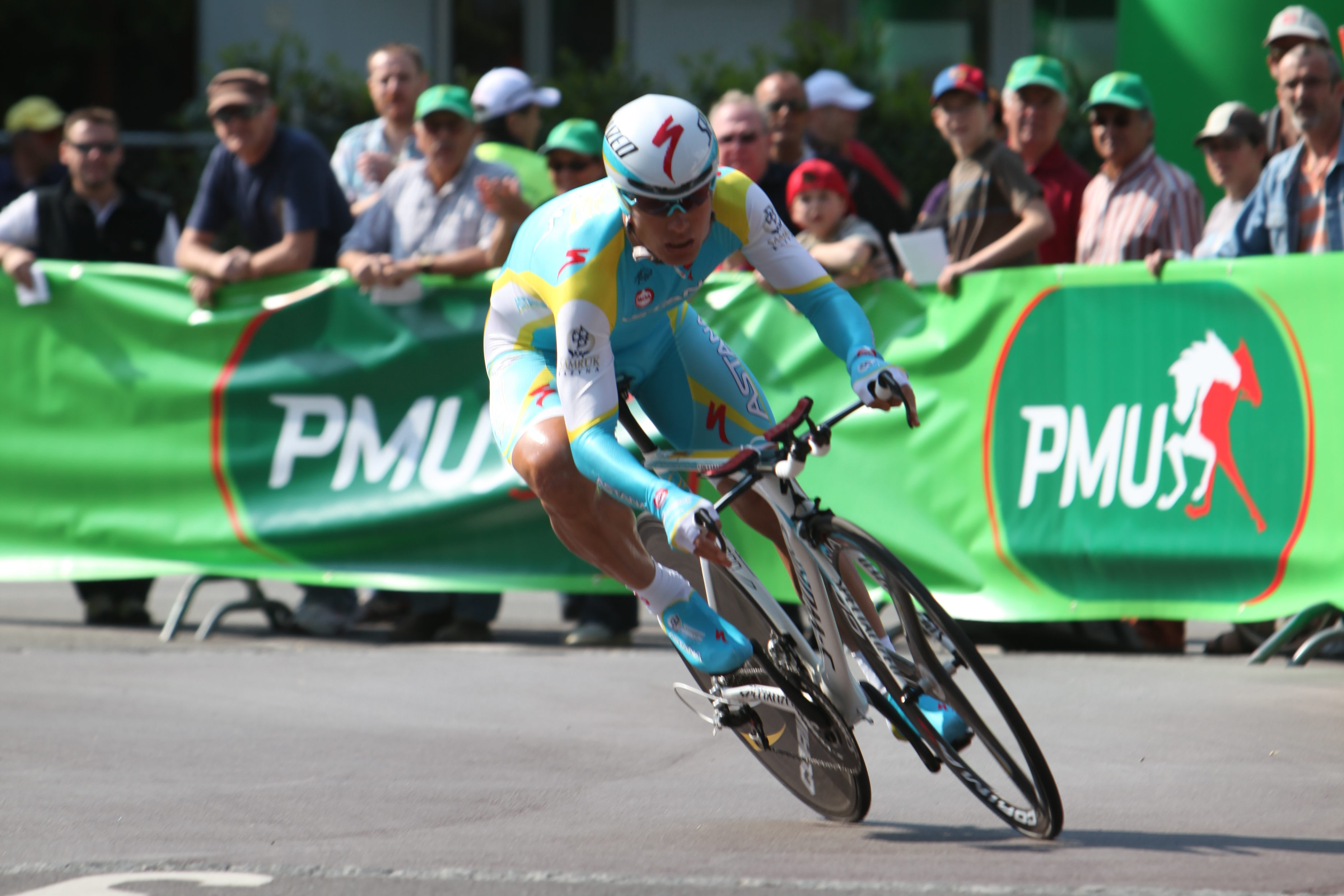
Vinokourov in 2011 Tour de Romandie prologue.

Vinokourov, banned for a year after doping at the 2007 Tour de France, told the Belgian TV program Sporza that he wanted to race again in 2009. He said:

I love cycling. I want to come back because I didn't want to end my career in this way. I feel as if I can win once again the big races.

The UCI then renewed an appeal to the Court of Arbitration for Sport, asking it to overturn the one-year suspension by the Kazakh federation and to impose a standard two-year ban. This appeal, originally filed in 2007, was dropped when Vinokourov said he was retiring. The case was retabled and the CAS ruled the ban would expire on 24 July 2009.

Vinokourov made his comeback in Tour de l'Ain in August 2009, riding for Kazakhstan. In the third stage, a time trial over 8.6 km, he won his first race after his ban. Vinokourov re-joined Astana on 24 August 2009 and was named for the 2009 Vuelta a España.

Returning after a blood doping sanction after the 2007 Tour de France and sidelined from the sport, Vinokourov began his first important race the 2010 Giro d'Italia. He rode well in the early-season Tour of the Mediterranean, where he finished 5th overall, and served as a super-domestique for his Astana teammate Alberto Contador at the Critérium International. He rode to victory in April at the opening time trial of the Giro del Trentino in Italy, where he took 35 seconds out of former Giro winner Ivan Basso in only 12.5 km. He successfully defended his overall lead and won the event over fellow doper, Riccardo Riccò of the Ceramica Flaminia team. It was his first major win since he returned to Astana the previous August, and an unusually-expressive Vinokourov shared his thoughts post-race:

It's a great satisfaction. By winning the first stage against the clock I didn't think I would keep the jersey until the end. I even thought not to ride this last stage because I would have driven to Liege if there was no plane. Fortunately, the volcano in Iceland has subsided. I have a flight tonight from Bergamo to Belgium. It [the fact that he wouldn't have to drive] especially helped me to defend my jersey until the final. Riccó is very strong and I feared him a lot with a uphill finish like today. He arrived second and I went fourth just 12 seconds behind, which means that my legs were not bad either.

Because of his recent doping suspension, Vinokourov could not count on riding the 2010 Tour de France, but Giro organizers had no similar qualms about inviting him to their event. He targeted a strong performance in the Italian grand tour, although he took pains to downplay his chances of overall victory:

I do not talk about winning [the Giro d'Italia], but I would certainly [aim to] wear the pink jersey for one day. That would be nice for my collection.

With Contador's help, Vinokourov won the 2010 Liège–Bastogne–Liège, six seconds clear of breakaway companion Alexandr Kolobnev with Spain's Alejandro Valverde coming in third, more than a minute after the pair. In December 2011, Swiss magazine L'Illustre ran a story about how Vinokourov had allegedly bought the victory. It was revealed that Kolobnev (who was not on the same team) received a payment of 100,000 Euros after the race from a bank account owned by the Kazakh in Monaco to Kolobnev's bank account in Locarno. The magazine published the e-mail exchange between the two, which started the day after the race. In these, Kolobnev wonders if he had done the right thing by letting him win and shares a copy of his bank info, expressing concerns that they may get caught. Vinokourov replied: "You have done everything properly, do not worry. As you say, the Earth is round and God sees everything [...] Do not worry about the agreement, I will do it." Vinokourov did not deny a payment was made, but said that he did not buy the race: "It's another story to blacken my name. I often loan money left and right." In 2015 investigators in Liege recommended that Vinokourov be tried for bribery. A trial date was initially fixed for March 2017, but has been postponed and is slated to begin in May 2018. On 12 September 2019, prosecutors requested for Vinokourov and Kolobnev to be sentenced to six months in prison and Vinokourov to be fined €100,000. on 5 November 2019, Vinokourov was cleared of the charge of fraud, with the judge citing "lack of concrete evidence" for the court's decision.

Paired with his Spanish teammate in the Ardennes, Vinokourov paved the way for Contador's supremacy in July, and pledged fealty to the defending Tour de France champ, whom he vowed to support:

It has always been the plan that I'd work for Alberto at the Tour and for myself at the Giro.

Barely a month later at the Giro d'Italia, Vinokourov finished 6th overall after having worn the pink jersey as leader of the general classification for five dramatic stages.

On just his third day ever racing the Giro, Vinokourov inherited the pink leader's jersey from Cadel Evans of BMC after the Australian was involved in a seafront crash with 15 km to go to the finish. Vinokourov couldn't hide the fact that he was happy to lead the Giro:

I was riding the last ten kilometres without thinking of taking the pink jersey. I had seen that André Greipel was up there, so I was convinced that he'd win the stage and take the pink jersey with the time bonus. But he didn't win, so the jersey is mine. To get it is wonderful. I received it without looking for it, really. This is my first participation to the Giro d'Italia and I already have the jersey.

Vinokourov fulfilled his promise to Contador and served as his teammate's super-domestique during the Tour, which Contador completed ahead of Andy Schleck and Denis Menchov. However Contador's victory was vacated when it was determined he had tested positive for a minute amount of the banned drug clenbuterol. Despite this, Astana still saw some measure of success in the Tour, with Vinokourov winning stage 13 after a solo attack over the last climb of the day and a determined effort to hold off the field. He summed up his triumph:

I showed I worked hard in these two years.

=== 2011–2012 ===
In the 9th stage of the Tour de France 2011 Vinokourov fell and broke his right femur. On 17 July 2011, his "retirement" from professional cycling was announced, unofficially and without comment, on Twitter pages by fellow cyclists. Later that day he confirmed his retirement. Rehabilitating from the accident he discovered he felt better than he had anticipated, and decided to ride the 2011 Giro di Lombardia before retiring. In September, he decided to postpone his retirement altogether, and announced he would return for the 2012 season and ride for Astana in the Tour de France.

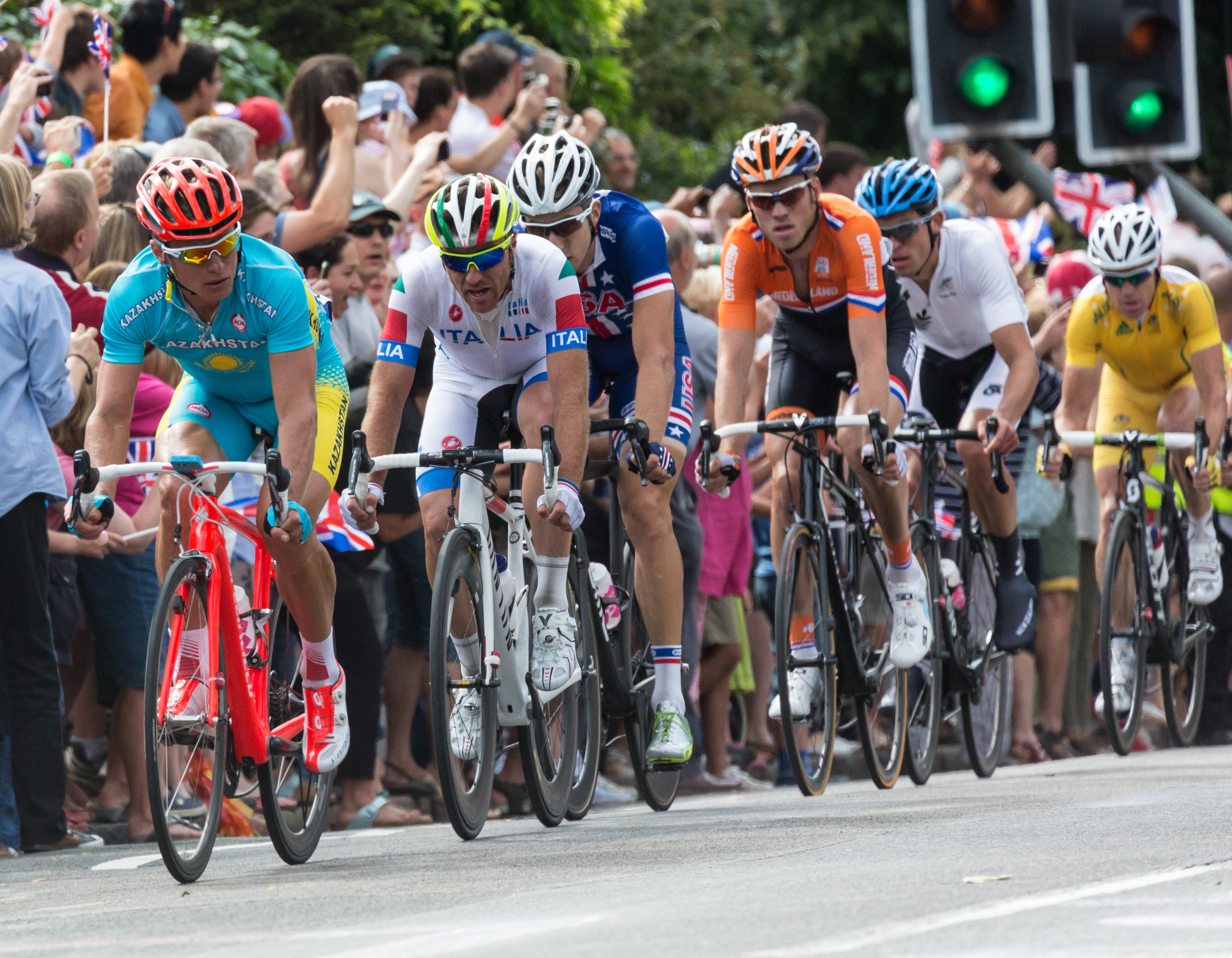
Vinokourov (left) during the Road Race at the 2012 Olympics in London.

True to his word, Vinokourov returned to pro cycling in 2012 as a rider and debuted at the Tour de Langkawi with his Astana teammates, the same place that Vinokourov started his pro career with Casino with his 1997 performance with the Kazakhstan national team.

Vinokourov stated that the team was aiming for the "overall title", as opposed to any personal win. He explained,

This is my first big race since I crashed at the Tour de France last year and it will be a good start for my season, for me to find my rhythm before heading to Europe for the Classics.

While he had a quiet spring season of racing, barring accident, illness, or another doping scandal, Vinokourov's spot on Astana's Tour de France 2012 roster was secure owing to his status within the team and the symbolic importance for Kazakhstan of his participation. And while he did not win a stage, Vinokourov featured in several breakaways, including an attack on Stage 18 that saw him win the Combativity award for the day.

One week after the conclusion of the Tour, Vinokourov won the gold medal in the Men's Road Race at the London 2012 Olympics. Vinokourov and the Colombian Rigoberto Urán attacked out of a large breakaway group with 8 km to go and worked steadily together until the finish. He then drew ahead of Urán in the final three hundred meters, and crossed the line alone, arms-aloft. Afterward, he said,

It's just unbelievable. I finished the Tour de France a little tired, but the Olympics, I must go there." About the breakaway group, he continued, "It was up-down, up-down, too many people. It was very dangerous. I knew that if I was following the group I would have had no chance in the sprint. I finish my career with this victory."

He became one of the oldest cyclists male or female to win an olympic medal and had the race been a World Championship he would have been older than the oldest rider to ever win gold with Joop Zoetemelk in 1985. Vinokourov also stated that had this race been a world championship he felt it would have come down to a sprint finish because the teams would have been more complete and would have had better communication by using team radios, which were not used in the Olympics.

Confirming his retirement after collecting his medal, Vinokourov – the only Olympic medalist in the men's road race from an Asian country – also became the only cyclist to win two medals in the discipline. Before winning gold in 2012, he claimed silver in 2000 (see Men's Road Race for a list of all medalists in this event). Vinokourov's last official competition would be the time trial at the Olympics the following week. He explained:

It is nice to finish off my career with a gold medal. I will still race in the time trial on Wednesday, but I will just spin. I have what I have wanted. I have the gold medal and I can envision my retirement.

After his win, he released a statement saying that he may "continue in select events in 2012".

I just won an Olympic title. It was a dream, so I cannot be sad. This is the last important race of my career, but I might race some other races at the end of this season as an Olympic champion.

Vinokourov rode his last race at the 2012 Clásica de San Sebastián.

On Sunday, September 10, 2023, in Nice, he won the Ironman World Championships in the 50-54 age category, clocking a time of 9 hours and 35 minutes.

== Retirement ==
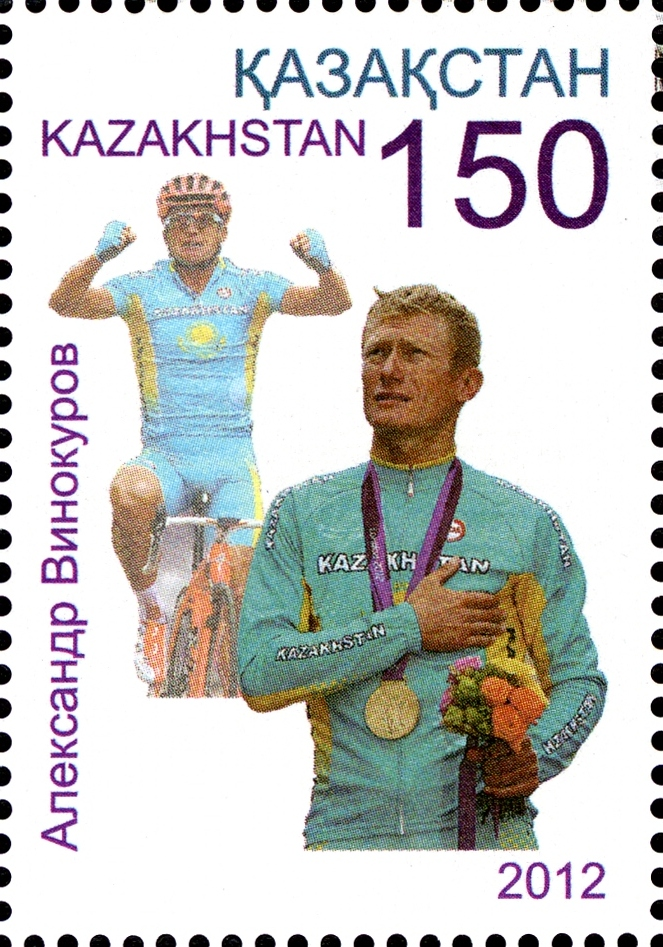
Stamp of Kazakhstan, 2013

On 16 September 2012, Vinokourov auctioned his Olympic gold-winning Specialized bicycle. It was sold to the Tak Group Company for $243,000. The starting price amounted to $50,000. Vinokourov donated the money from the auction for treatment of five children with serious diseases.

The bicycle brought good luck to me and I can now support the young citizens of Kazakhstan who are having a difficult time by selling this bicycle. I hope that some of them will become champions, not necessarily in sport, but in their own lives. They should be strong in spirit and fight to the end! And this way they will win", Vinokourov said at the closure of the auction.

In the autumn of 2012, Alexander Vinokourov entered L.N. Gumilyov Eurasian National University to work towards a master's degree in Physical Education.

== Career achievements ==
=== Major results ===
1994
Asian Games

1st Team time trial
2nd Time trial
2nd Road race

1996
10th Overall Rheinland-Pfalz Rundfahrt
1997
4th Overall Tour de Pologne
1998
1st Overall Tour de Picardie

1st Stage 2a

1st Overall Circuit de Lorraine

1st Stage 4 (ITT)

1st Overall Four Days of Dunkirk
2nd Overall Vuelta a Murcia
2nd Grand Prix de la Ville de Lillers
6th Overall Tour de Wallonie
7th Overall Étoile de Bessèges
8th Overall Tour de Pologne

1st Stage 6

8th Grand Prix de Villers-Cotterêts
8th Cholet-Pays de la Loire
1999
1st Overall Critérium du Dauphiné Libéré

1st Points classification
1st Stage 2

1st Overall Volta a la Comunitat Valenciana

1st Stage 5b (ITT)

1st Stage 3 Tour du Limousin
2nd Overall Grand Prix du Midi Libre

1st Stages 2 & 6

2nd Gran Premio Bruno Beghelli
2nd Giro della Romagna
3rd Classic Haribo
5th Overall Four Days of Dunkirk
10th Classique des Alpes
2000
1st Stage 18 Vuelta a España
1st Stage 1 (TTT) Tour de Suisse
2nd Road race, Olympic Games
3rd Overall Critérium International
7th Overall Tour Down Under
7th Liège–Bastogne–Liège
2001
1st Overall Deutschland Tour

1st Stage 6 (ITT)

3rd Overall Volta a la Comunitat Valenciana
5th Overall Tour de Suisse

1st Stage 4

6th Overall Grand Prix du Midi Libre
6th Overall Critérium International
7th Overall Paris–Nice
2002
1st Overall Paris–Nice

1st Stage 4

1st Stage 3 Tour de Suisse
2nd Road race, Asian Games
2nd Tour du Haut Var
7th Overall Tour of the Basque Country
10th Liège–Bastogne–Liège
2003
1st Overall Paris–Nice

1st Stage 5

1st Overall Tour de Suisse

1st Points classification
1st Stage 1

1st Amstel Gold Race
3rd Overall Tour de France

1st Stage 9
Combativity award Overall

3rd Overall Deutschland Tour
3rd LuK Challenge Chrono (with Bobby Julich)
10th Overall Tour of the Basque Country
2004
1st Overall Regio-Tour

1st Points classification
1st Stages 2 (ITT) & 3

Paris–Nice

1st Stages 5, 7 & 8

3rd Time trial, UCI Road World Championships
3rd Liège–Bastogne–Liège
5th La Flèche Wallonne
5th Time trial, Olympic Games
9th Overall Critérium International
2005
1st Road race, National Road Championships
1st Liège–Bastogne–Liège
2nd Overall Bayern Rundfahrt
5th Overall Tour de France

1st Stages 11 & 21

5th Overall Critérium du Dauphiné Libéré

1st Stage 4

5th Time trial, UCI Road World Championships
9th LuK Challenge Chrono (with Daniele Nardello)
2006
1st Overall Vuelta a España

1st Combination classification
1st Stages 8, 9 & 20 (ITT)

1st Overall Vuelta a Castilla y León

1st Stage 5

National Road Championships

2nd Road race
5th Time trial

3rd Time trial, UCI Road World Championships
2007
~~Tour de France~~

~~1st Stages 13 (ITT) & 15~~

Critérium du Dauphiné Libéré

1st Points classification
1st Stages 3 (ITT) & 7

3rd Overall Tirreno–Adriatico
2009
Asian Road Championships

1st Time trial
2nd Road race

1st Chrono des Nations
1st Stage 3b (ITT) Tour de l'Ain
5th Giro dell'Emilia
7th Giro di Lombardia
8th Time trial, UCI Road World Championships
2010
1st Overall Giro del Trentino

1st Stage 1 (ITT)

1st Liège–Bastogne–Liège
1st Stage 13 Tour de France
2nd Clásica de San Sebastián
4th Overall La Méditerranéenne
6th Overall Giro d'Italia
2011
3rd Overall Tour de Romandie

1st Stage 3

3rd Overall Critérium du Dauphiné
4th La Flèche Wallonne
8th Overall Tour of the Basque Country

1st Stage 3

2012
1st Road race, Olympic Games
Combativity award Stage 18 Tour de France

==== General classification results timeline ====
Grand Tour general classification results
Grand Tour	1998	1999	2000	2001	2002	2003	2004	2005	2006	2007	2008	2009	2010	2011	2012
Giro d'Italia	—	—	—	—	—	—	—	—	—	—	—	—	6	—	—
Tour de France	—	35	15	16	—	3	—	5	—	DNF	—	—	15	DNF	31
/ Vuelta a España	—	—	28	—	DNF	—	DNF	—	1	—	—	DNF	—	—	—
Major stage race general classification results
Race	1998	1999	2000	2001	2002	2003	2004	2005	2006	2007	2008	2009	2010	2011	2012
/ Paris–Nice	—	DNF	12	7	1	1	46	16	—	—	—	—	—	DNF	—
/ Tirreno–Adriatico	—	—	—	—	—	—	—	—	—	3	—	—	33	—	—
Volta a Catalunya	—	—	—	—	—	—	—	—	—	16	—	—	—	—	—
Tour of the Basque Country	—	—	13	DNF	7	10	DNF	35	—	—	—	—	—	8	—
/ Tour de Romandie	—	—	—	—	—	—	—	—	—	—	—	—	—	3	—
Critérium du Dauphiné	23	1	—	—	—	—	—	5	49	20	—	—	—	3	119
Tour de Suisse	—	—	58	5	DNF	1	DNF	—	—	—	—	—	—	—	—

==== Classics results timeline ====
Monument	1998	1999	2000	2001	2002	2003	2004	2005	2006	2007	2008	2009	2010	2011	2012
Milan–San Remo	—	—	105	31	42	97	59	34	141	—	—	—	—	—	—
Tour of Flanders	Has not contested during his career														
Paris–Roubaix	DNF	—	—	—	—	—	—	—	—	—	—	—	—	—	—
Liège–Bastogne–Liège	—	DNF	7	30	10	61	3	1	30	43	—	—	1	32	—
Giro di Lombardia	—	—	—	—	11	—	—	—	—	—	—	7	—	—	—
Classic	1998	1999	2000	2001	2002	2003	2004	2005	2006	2007	2008	2009	2010	2011	2012
Amstel Gold Race	—	36	17	25	—	1	27	59	—	—	—	—	—	17	—
La Flèche Wallonne	—	—	30	26	40	DNF	5	12	—	54	—	—	—	4	—
Clásica de San Sebastián	DNF	124	—	—	—	128	—	—	39	—	—	—	2	—	35

Legend
—	Did not compete
DNF	Did not finish

=== Awards and honours ===
Vinokourov was awarded the rank of honorary colonel in the Kazakh army in 2000, after he finished second to his then-Telekom teammate Jan Ullrich in the men's Olympic road race in Sydney. He was again recognized by the state for his sporting prowess in 2003 after finishing third overall in the Tour and received a medal as People's Hero First Class. In late-2011 Vino was named as a candidate for parliamentary elections in Kazakhstan despite still being active as a professional cyclist. Alexander Vinokourov opened his own bicycle shop on 5 May 2012 in Almaty.

== Personal life ==
Alexander is married to Svetlana Vinokourova. They have three children together two of whom are professional cyclists; Alexandre Vinokurov and Nicolas Vinokurov.

== See also ==
- List of doping cases in cycling
- List of sportspeople sanctioned for doping offences
