= Maxim Gourov =

Kazakhstani cyclist

Personal information
- Full name: Maxim Gourov
- Born: January 30, 1979 (age 47) Almaty, Kazakhstan
- Height: 1.89 m (6 ft 2 in)
- Weight: 76 kg (168 lb)

Cycling career
- Sport: Cycling
- Discipline: Road
- Role: Rider

Amateur teams
- 2005: Roanne
- 2006: Montmarault

Professional teams
- 2003–2004: Oktos-Saint Quentin
- 2007: Astana
- 2008–2009: A-Style Somn
- 2010–2011: Astana

Maxim Gourov (born January 30, 1979) is a Kazakhstani professional road bicycle racer. He is currently a free agent, having last ridden for the XDS Astana Team team.

== Major results ==
- Giro d'Italia – 118th
- Kazakhstan Time Trial Championships – (bronze)
- Vuelta a la Argentina – 1 stage (2000)
