= 2006 Vuelta a Burgos =

Race details
- Dates: August 6–10 2006
- Stages: 5
- Distance: 671.8 km (417.4 mi)
- Winning time: 15h 45' 32"

Results
	Winner	Iban Mayo (ESP)	(Euskaltel–Euskadi)
	Second	José Antonio Pecharromán (ESP)	(Comunidad Valenciana)
	Third	David Herrero (ESP)	(Euskaltel–Euskadi)

The 2006 Vuelta a Burgos was the 28th edition of the Vuelta a Burgos road cycling stage race, which was held from 6 August to 10 August 2006. The race started in Briviesca and finished in Burgos. The race was won by Iban Mayo of the Euskaltel–Euskadi team.

== General classification ==
Final general classification

Rank	Rider	Team	Time
1	Iban Mayo (ESP)	Euskaltel–Euskadi	15h 45' 32"
2	José Antonio Pecharromán (ESP)	Comunidad Valenciana	+ 49"
3	David Herrero (ESP)	Euskaltel–Euskadi	+ 51"
4	Daniel Moreno (ESP)	Relax–GAM	+ 54"
5	Alexis Rodríguez (ESP)	3 Molinos Resort	+ 56"
6	Ricardo Serrano (ESP)	Kaiku	+ 1' 01"
7	Mauricio Soler (COL)	Acqua & Sapone	+ 1' 07"
8	Iván Gutiérrez (ESP)	Caisse d'Epargne–Illes Balears	+ 1' 10"
9	Ezequiel Mosquera (ESP)	Comunidad Valenciana	+ 1' 22"
10	Sergio Ghisalberti (ITA)	Team Milram	+ 1' 23"
