= 2007 Tour of the Basque Country =

Race details
- Dates: 9–14 April 2007
- Stages: 6
- Distance: 862.5 km (535.9 mi)
- Winning time: 21h 56' 38"

Results
	Winner	Juan José Cobo (ESP)	(Saunier Duval–Prodir)
	Second	Ángel Vicioso (ESP)	(Relax–GAM)
	Third	Samuel Sánchez (ESP)	(Euskaltel–Euskadi)

The 2007 Tour of the Basque Country was the 47th edition of the Tour of the Basque Country road cycling stage race, taking place from 9 April to 14 April 2007. The race was won by Juan José Cobo of the Saunier Duval–Prodir cycling team.

== Stages ==
=== Stage 1 ===
9 April 2007 – Urretxu to Urretxu, 139 km (86 mi)

Stage 1 result

	Cyclist	Team	Time	UCI ProTour Points
1	(Spain) Juan José Cobo	SDV	3h 43' 05"	3 pts
2	(Spain) Constantino Zaballa	CEI	+ 10"	2 pts
3	(Spain) Óscar Sevilla	REG	+ 11"	N/A

General Classification after Stage 1

	Cyclist	Team	Time
1	(Spain) Juan José Cobo	SDV	3h 43' 05"
2	(Spain) Constantino Zaballa	CEI	+ 10"
3	(Spain) Óscar Sevilla	REG	+ 11"

=== Stage 2 ===
10 April 2007 – Urretxu to Karrantza, 191.5 km (119.0 mi)

Stage 2 result

	Cyclist	Team	Time	UCI ProTour Points
1	(Spain) Manuel Beltrán	LIQ	4h 51' 55"	3 pts
2	(Spain) José Antonio Redondo	AST	+ 15"	2 pts
3	(Spain) José Ángel Gómez Marchante	SDV	+ 19"	1 pt

General Classification after Stage 2

	Cyclist	Team	Time
1	(Spain) Juan José Cobo	SDV	8h 35' 26"
2	(Spain) José Ángel Gómez Marchante	SDV	+ 6"
3	(Spain) Manuel Beltrán	LIQ	+ 6"

=== Stage 3 ===
11 April 2007 – Karrantza to Vitoria-Gasteiz, 173 km (107 mi)

Stage 3 result

	Cyclist	Team	Time	UCI ProTour Points
1	(Spain) Ángel Vicioso	REG	4h 04' 06"	N/A
2	(Spain) Francisco Javier Vila Errandonea	LAM	s.t.	2 pts
3	(Spain) Iker Camaño	SDV	s.t.	1 pt

General Classification after Stage 3

	Cyclist	Team	Time
1	(Spain) Ángel Vicioso	REG	12h 39' 58"
2	(Netherlands) Bram Tankink	QSI	+ 2' 00"
3	(Spain) Juan José Cobo	SDV	+ 2' 14"

=== Stage 4 ===
12 April 2007 – Vitoria-Gasteiz to Lekunberri, 173 km (107 mi)

Stage 4 result

	Cyclist	Team	Time	UCI ProTour Points
1	(Germany) Jens Voigt	CSC	4h 32' 15"	3 pts
2	(Spain) José Ángel Gómez Marchante	SDV	+ 1' 39"	2 pts
3	(Spain) Alejandro Valverde	CEI	+ 1' 59"	1 pt

General Classification after Stage 4

	Cyclist	Team	Time
1	(Spain) Ángel Vicioso	REG	17h 14' 26"
2	(Spain) José Ángel Gómez Marchante	SDV	+ 1' 46"
3	(Spain) Juan José Cobo	SDV	+ 1' 54"

=== Stage 5 ===
13 April 2007 – Lekunberri to Oiartzun, 173 km (107 mi)

Stage 5 result

	Cyclist	Team	Time	UCI ProTour Points
1	(Spain) Juan José Cobo	SDV	4h 18' 38"	3 pts
2	(Spain) Samuel Sánchez	EUS	+ 1' 03"	2 pts
3	(Spain) Koldo Gil	SDV	+ 1' 38"	1 pt

General Classification after Stage 5

	Cyclist	Team	Time
1	(Spain) Juan José Cobo	SDV	21h 34' 58"
2	(Spain) Ángel Vicioso	REG	+ 1"
3	(Spain) Samuel Sánchez	EUS	+ 1' 20"

=== Stage 6 ===
14 April 2007 – Oiartzun to Oiartzun (ITT), 14 km (8.7 mi)

Stage 6 result

	Cyclist	Team	Time	UCI ProTour Points
1	(Spain) Samuel Sánchez	EUS	21' 36"	3 pts
2	(Spain) Alberto Contador	DSC	+ 2"	2 pts
3	(Spain) Juan José Cobo	SDV	+ 4"	1 pt

General Classification after Stage 6

	Cyclist	Team	Time
1	(Spain) Juan José Cobo	SDV	21h 56' 38"
2	(Spain) Ángel Vicioso	REG	+ 37"
3	(Spain) Samuel Sánchez	EUS	+ 1' 16"

== Final standing ==
=== General classification ===
	Cyclist	Country	Team	Time	UCI ProTour Points
1	Juan José Cobo	Spain	Saunier Duval–Prodir	21h 56' 38"	50
2	Ángel Vicioso	Spain	Relax–GAM	+ 37"	N/A
3	Samuel Sánchez	Spain	Euskaltel–Euskadi	+ 1' 16"	35
4	Damiano Cunego	Italy	Lampre–Fondital	+ 2' 26"	30
5	Alejandro Valverde	Spain	Caisse d'Epargne	+ 2' 42"	25
6	Davide Rebellin	Italy	Gerolsteiner	+ 2' 50"	20
7	Tadej Valjavec	Slovenia	Lampre–Fondital	+ 2' 57"	15
8	Fränk Schleck	Luxembourg	Team CSC	+ 3' 13"	10
9	Joaquim Rodríguez	Spain	Caisse d'Epargne	+ 3' 21"	5
10	Koldo Gil	Spain	Saunier Duval–Prodir	+ 3' 41"	2

=== Mountains classification ===
	Cyclist	Country	Team	Points
1	Aitor Hernández	Spain	Euskaltel–Euskadi	53
2	Manuel Beltrán	Spain	Liquigas	40
3	Mikel Astarloza	Spain	Euskaltel–Euskadi	39

=== Points classification ===
	Cyclist	Country	Team	Points
1	Iker Flores	Spain	Fuerteventura–Canarias	9
2	Jens Voigt	Germany	Team CSC	9
3	Mikel Artetxe	Spain	Fuerteventura–Canarias	8

=== Regularidad classification ===
	Cyclist	Country	Team	Points
1	Juan José Cobo	Spain	Saunier Duval–Prodir	78
2	Samuel Sánchez	Spain	Euskaltel–Euskadi	71
3	José Ángel Gómez Marchante	Spain	Saunier Duval–Prodir	59

=== Team classification ===
	Team	Country	Time
1	Saunier Duval–Prodir	Spain	65h 55' 37"
2	Caisse d'Epargne	Spain	+ 10' 29"
3	Lampre–Fondital	Italy	+ 10' 53"

== Jersey progress ==
Stage (Winner)	General Classification	Mountains Classification	Points Classification	Team Classification
Stage 1 (Juan José Cobo)	Juan José Cobo	Aitor Hernández	Vicente Ballester	Saunier Duval–Prodir
Stage 2 (Manuel Beltrán)	Juan José Cobo	Manuel Beltrán	Vicente Ballester	Saunier Duval–Prodir
Stage 3 (Ángel Vicioso)	Ángel Vicioso	Aitor Hernández	Iker Flores	Lampre–Fondital
Stage 4 (Jens Voigt)	Ángel Vicioso	Aitor Hernández	Iker Flores	Lampre–Fondital
Stage 5 (Juan José Cobo)	Juan José Cobo	Aitor Hernández	Iker Flores	Saunier Duval–Prodir
Stage 6 (Samuel Sánchez)	Juan José Cobo	Aitor Hernández	Iker Flores	Saunier Duval–Prodir
Final	Juan José Cobo	Aitor Hernández	Iker Flores	Saunier Duval–Prodir
