= 2006 Volta a la Comunitat Valenciana =

Race details
- Dates: 21–25 February 2006
- Stages: 5
- Distance: 799.5 km (496.8 mi)
- Winning time: 19h 19' 17"

Results
	Winner	Antonio Colom (ESP)	(Caisse d'Epargne–Illes Balears)
	Second	Ricardo Serrano (ESP)	(Kaiku)
	Third	David Bernabeu (ESP)	(Comunidad Valenciana)

The 2006 Volta a la Comunitat Valenciana was the 64th edition of the Volta a la Comunitat Valenciana road cycling stage race, which was held from 21 February to 25 February 2006. The race started in Calpe and finished in Valencia. The race was won by Antonio Colom of the Caisse d'Epargne–Illes Balears team.

== General classification ==
Final general classification

Rank	Rider	Team	Time
1	Antonio Colom (ESP)	Caisse d'Epargne–Illes Balears	19h 19' 17"
2	Ricardo Serrano (ESP)	Kaiku	+ 11"
3	David Bernabeu (ESP)	Comunidad Valenciana	+ 12"
4	Alexandr Kolobnev (RUS)	Rabobank	+ 15"
5	Francisco Javier Vila (ESP)	Lampre–Fondital	+ 25"
6	Gorka González (ESP)	Euskaltel–Euskadi	+ 37"
7	David López (ESP)	Euskaltel–Euskadi	+ 46"
8	Koos Moerenhout (NED)	Phonak	+ 47"
9	Thomas Löfkvist (SWE)	Française des Jeux	+ 49"
10	Santos González (ESP)	3 Molinos Resort	s.t.
