= Igor Flores =

Spanish cyclist

Personal information
- Full name: Igor Flores Galarza
- Born: 5 December 1973 (age 52) Urdiain, Navarre, Spain

Cycling career
- Sport: Cycling
- Current team: Retired
- Discipline: Road
- Role: Rider

Professional team
- 1996–2002: Equipo Euskadi

Igor Flores Galarza (born 5 December 1973 in Urdiain, Navarre) is a Spanish former professional road bicycle racer, who rode professionally between 1996 and 2002, entirely for the Euskaltel–Euskadi team.

In 2002, Flores finished last in the Tour de France. Igor Flores is the brother of Iker Flores, who finished last in the 2005 Tour de France.

== Major results ==
1997
1st Stage 8 Ruta Azteca
2001
1st Stage 4 Vuelta Ciclista a la Rioja
2002
1st Trofeo Manacor, Port d'Alcudia

=== Grand Tour general classification results timeline ===
Grand Tour	1999	2000	2001	2002
Giro d'Italia	—	—	—	—
Tour de France	—	—	—	153
Vuelta a España	75	—	65	—
