= 2007 Clásica de Almería =

Race details
- Dates: 4 March 2007
- Stages: 1
- Distance: 186 km (115.6 mi)
- Winning time: ~~4h 18' 40"~~

Results
	Winner	~~Giuseppe Muraglia~~ (ITA)
	Second	Eduard Vorganov (RUS)
	Third	Vicente Ballester (ESP)

The 2007 Clásica de Almería was the 22nd edition of the Clásica de Almería cycle race and was held on 4 March 2007. The race started in Puebla de Vícar and finished in Almería. The race was initially won by Giuseppe Muraglia, who was later disqualified for doping.

== General classification ==
Final general classification

Rank	Rider	Time
~~1~~	~~Giuseppe Muraglia (ITA)~~	~~4h 18' 40"~~
2	Eduard Vorganov (RUS)	+ 0"
3	Vicente Ballester (ESP)	+ 0"
4	Juan Olmo (ESP)	+ 3"
5	Danilo Napolitano (ITA)	+ 59"
6	Andrea Masciarelli (ITA)	+ 59"
7	José Luis Carrasco (ESP)	+ 59"
8	Marco Marcato (ITA)	+ 1' 05"
9	Robert Gesink (NED)	+ 1' 26"
10	David de la Fuente (ESP)	+ 1' 32"
