= Lidl–Trek (men's team) =

German cycling team

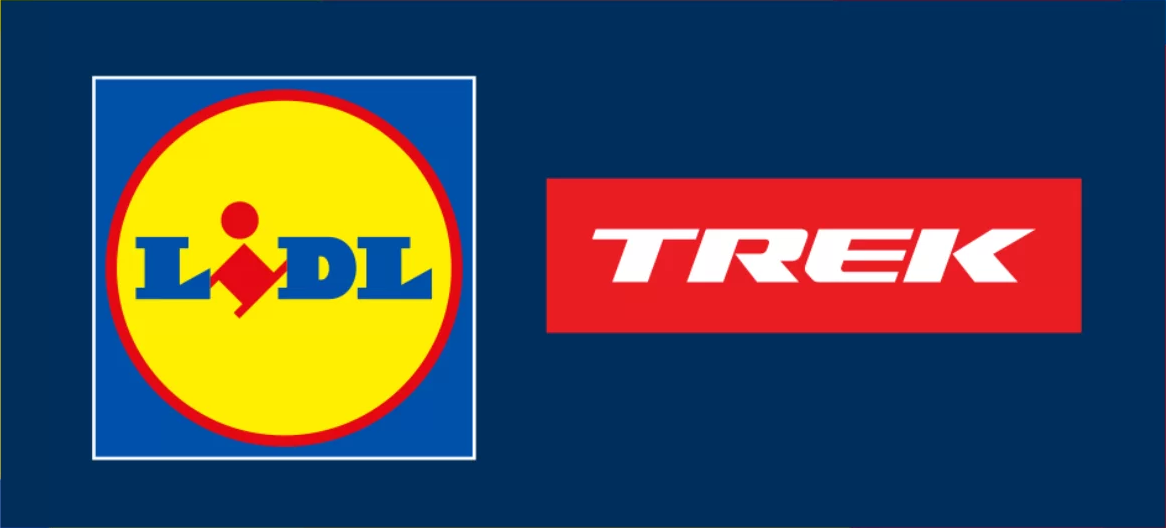

Team information
- UCI code: LTK
- Registered: Luxembourg (2011–2013); United States (2014–2025); Germany (2026–present)
- Founded: 2011
- Discipline: Road
- Status: UCI WorldTeam
- Bicycles: Trek
- Components: SRAM
- Website: Team home page

Key personnel
- General manager: Luca Guercilena
- Team managers: Kim Andersen, Adriano Baffi, Dirk Demol, Alain Gallopin, Josu Larrazabal, Luc Meersman, Yaroslav Popovych, Fabian Cancellara, Steven de Jongh

Team name history
2011	Leopard Trek (LEO)
2012	RadioShack–Nissan (RNT)
2013	RadioShack–Leopard (RLT)
2014–2015	Trek Factory Racing (TFR)
2016–2023	Trek–Segafredo (TFS)
2023–	Lidl–Trek (LTK)

Lidl–Trek (UCI team code: LTK) is a professional road bicycle racing team at UCI WorldTeam level licensed in Germany for 2026. Formerly RadioShack–Nissan, in 2014, Trek took over the ownership of the team and its ProTeam License.

== History ==
=== 2011 ===
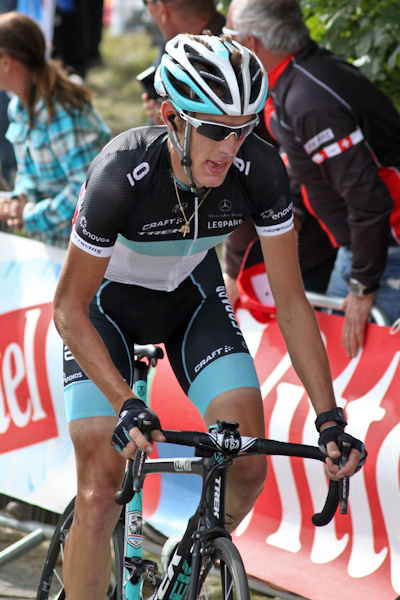
Andy Schleck (pictured here at the 2011 Tour de France during the team's first season) was instrumental in the foundation of Leopard Trek.

The team was founded in 2011 under the name of Leopard Trek and officially stylized as LEOPARD TREK with Brian Nygaard and Kim Andersen as team managers. The Schleck brothers were under contract with the Danish team Saxo Bank managed by Bjarne Riis through the end of the 2010 season. Several other Team Saxo Bank riders followed the Schleck brothers to the new team, including veterans Jens Voigt, Fabian Cancellara and Stuart O'Grady. Subsequent signings included sprinter Daniele Bennati, Davide Viganò and Joost Posthuma.

The team became active at the start of the 2011 cycling season. On 13 December 2010, Jakob Fuglsang revealed that the team would be called Team Leopard, in reference to the management company run by Nygaard. Trek, the bike supplier, confirmed shortly before the team was officially presented that they would be a co-title sponsor, giving the team a full name of "Leopard Trek."

Team rider Wouter Weylandt died as a result of a high-speed, downhill crash during the 2011 Giro d'Italia. The remaining riders of Leopard Trek left the competition at the completion of the following day's stage.

=== 2012 ===
For the 2012 season, the team was renamed RadioShack–Nissan–Trek. The reason is that the American Team RadioShack ceased racing, and their former sponsors joined the Luxembourg Cycling Project. Johan Bruyneel along with several riders from Team RadioShack moved to the new team. The lineup for 2012 was officially confirmed on 5 December 2011. The official UCI name for the team is RadioShack Nissan and it is registered in Luxembourg.

While the UCI ProTeam is now named RadioShack–Nissan–Trek, in December 2011 Leopard also launched a UCI Continental Team, consisting mainly of U23 riders, called Leopard-Trek.

On 17 July 2012, Fränk Schleck was removed from the 2012 Tour de France by the team during the second rest day after his A-sample returned traces of Xipamide. Team RadioShack–Nissan won the team classification of the Tour de France.

Johan Bruyneel stood down as general manager on 12 October in the aftermath of the publication by the US Anti-Doping Agency of its "reasoned decision" on the Lance Armstrong doping case.

On 21 December 2012, Nissan announced that they would cease to sponsor the team, with immediate effect.

=== 2013 ===
During the 2013 Tour de France Team RadioShack-Leopard announced that they would not renew Fränk Schleck's contract, leaving him without a team. It also caused a serious and public rift between his brother Andy Schleck and team management, putting his future with the team into doubt.

In September 2013, Chris Horner beat Vincenzo Nibali to win the 2013 Vuelta a España becoming the oldest grand tour winner in history, winning two stages along the way.

=== 2014 ===
On 3 July, the team announced that Samsung would become a new minor sponsor of the team.

=== 2015 ===
On 16 December 2015, the team announced that Italian coffee brand Segafredo had committed to a three-year co-title sponsorship effective 1 January 2016, with the team changing name to Trek–Segafredo.

=== 2016 ===
In April the team announced US software company CA Technologies would sponsor the team with immediate effect until the end of the 2017 season. In March 2017 the deal was extended through 2019.

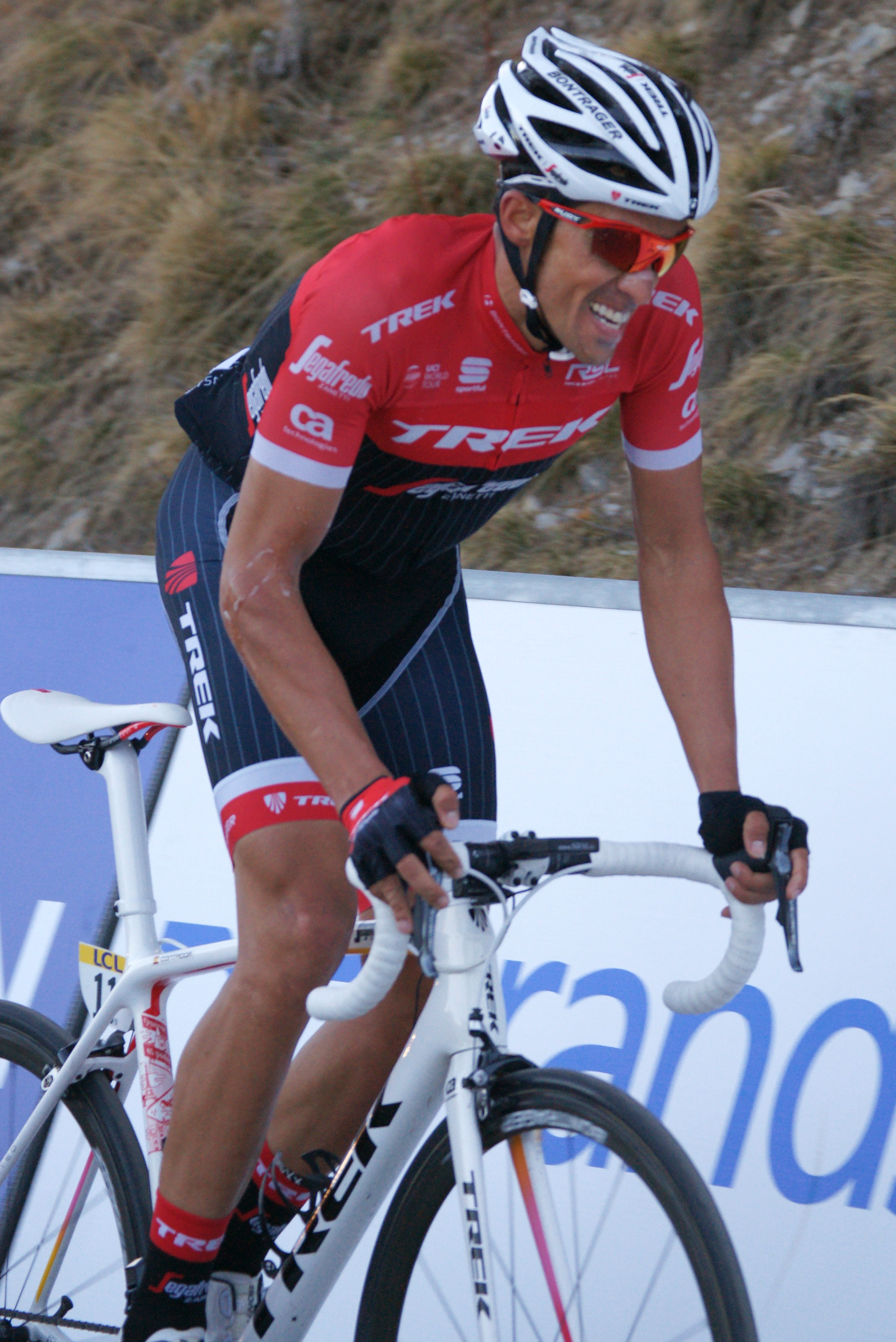
Alberto Contador (pictured at the 2017 Paris–Nice) rode his last professional season with the team in 2017.

For the 2017 season, the team announced the signings of Alberto Contador, John Degenkolb (until 2019), Koen de Kort (until 2018), Jarlinson Pantano, and Ivan Basso.

=== 2020 ===
The team suspended the 2019 junior road race world champion Quinn Simmons for actions on Twitter, where he used a black hand emoji that Trek–Segafredo considered racially insensitive

=== 2023 ===
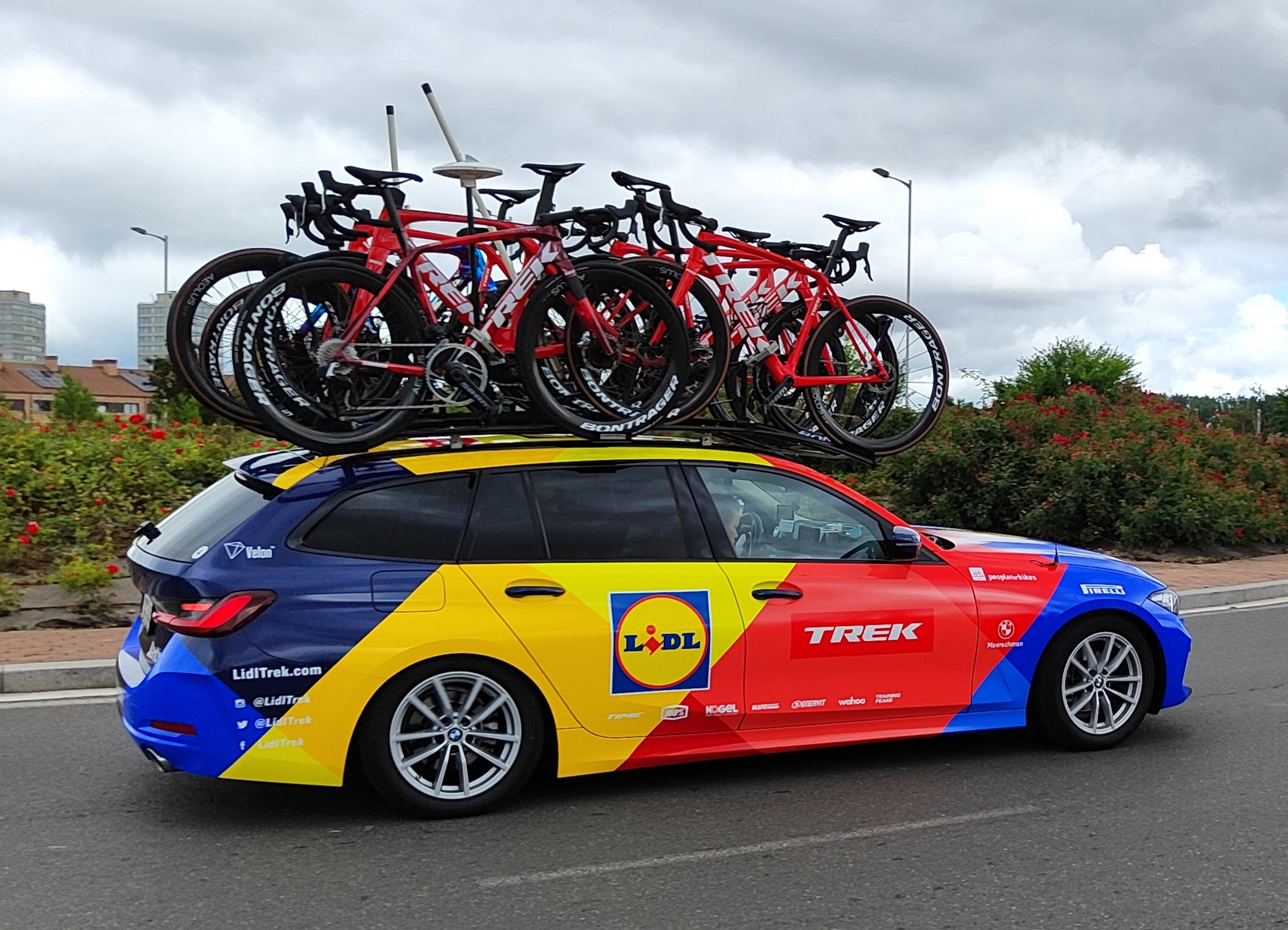
Lidl–Trek team car at the 2023 Tour de France

In 2023, both the men's and women's teams were rebranded as Lidl–Trek, thanks to sponsorship from supermarket chain Lidl. This rebrand came into effect on 30 June, prior to the Giro Donne and the Tour de France / Tour de France Femmes.

=== 2025 ===
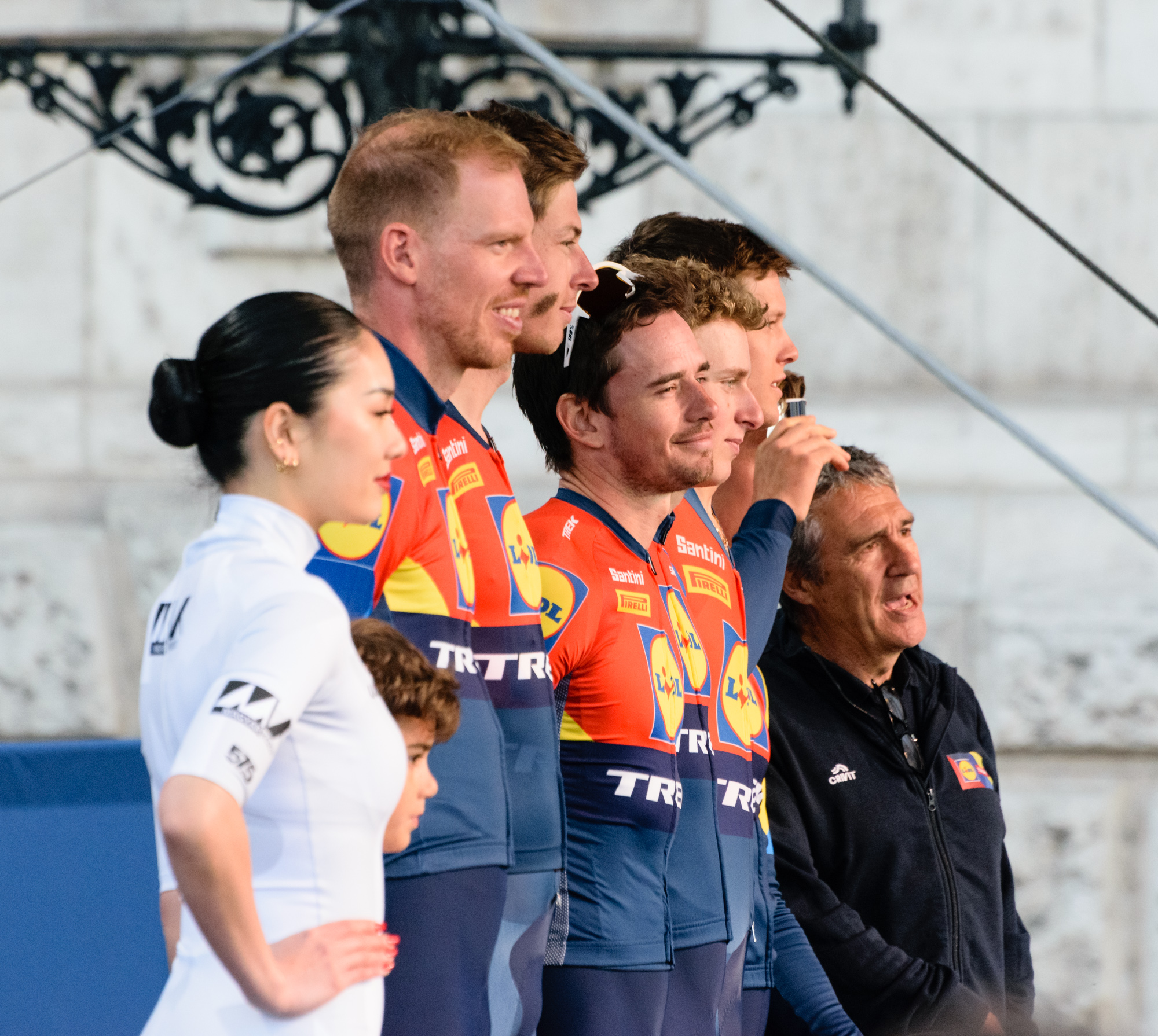
Lidl–Trek at the 2025 Tour de Hongrie

In October 2025 Lidl became majority owner of the team. With the majority ownership the teams license will be registered in Germany from 2026 onwards.

== Team roster ==
As of 14 March 2026.

Rider	Date of birth
Juan Ayuso (ESP)	16 September 2002 (age 24)
Andrea Bagioli (ITA)	23 March 1999 (age 27)
Julien Bernard (FRA)	17 March 1992 (age 34)
Giulio Ciccone (ITA)	20 December 1994 (age 31)
Simone Consonni (ITA)	12 September 1994 (age 32)
Derek Gee-West (CAN)	3 August 1997 (age 29)
Tao Geoghegan Hart (GBR)	30 March 1995 (age 31)
Amanuel Ghebreigzabhier (ERI)	17 August 1994 (age 32)
Lennard Kämna (GER)	9 September 1996 (age 30)
Patrick Konrad (AUT)	23 October 1991 (age 34)
Søren Kragh Andersen (DEN)	10 August 1994 (age 32)
Jonathan Milan (ITA)	1 October 2000 (age 25)
Bauke Mollema (NED)	26 November 1986 (age 39)
Jacopo Mosca (ITA)	29 August 1993 (age 33)
Mathias Norsgaard (DEN)	5 May 1997 (age 29)

Rider	Date of birth
Thibau Nys (BEL)	12 November 2002 (age 23)
Sam Oomen (NED)	15 August 1995 (age 31)
Mads Pedersen (DEN)	18 December 1995 (age 30)
Albert Philipsen (DEN)	3 September 2006 (age 20)
Quinn Simmons (USA)	8 May 2001 (age 25)
Jakob Söderqvist (SWE)	31 May 2003 (age 23)
Mattias Skjelmose (DEN)	26 September 2000 (age 26)
Toms Skujiņš (LAT)	15 June 1991 (age 35)
Matteo Sobrero (ITA)	14 May 1997 (age 29)
Tim Torn Teutenberg (GER)	19 June 2002 (age 24)
Edward Theuns (BEL)	30 April 1991 (age 35)
Mathias Vacek (CZE)	12 June 2002 (age 24)
Otto Vergaerde (BEL)	15 July 1994 (age 32)
Carlos Verona (ESP)	4 November 1992 (age 33)
Max Walscheid (GER)	13 June 1993 (age 33)

== Doping ==
On 27 June 2017, the UCI announced André Cardoso tested positive for erythropoietin in an out-of-competition control on 18 June and has been provisionally suspended. He had been due to support Alberto Contador in his bid for the 2017 Tour de France, with Haimar Zubeldia taking the empty roster place.

In April 2019, Cycling Anti-Doping Foundation confirmed that Jarlinson Pantano had returned an adverse analytical finding for EPO, in a doping test carried out on 26 February. Pantano was immediately suspended by the team.

== National & World champions ==
2011
Luxembourg Road Race, Fränk Schleck
Switzerland Road Race, Fabian Cancellara
Germany Road Race, Robert Wagner
2012
Luxembourg Road Race, Laurent Didier
Denmark Time Trial, Jakob Fuglsang
Switzerland Time Trial, Fabian Cancellara
2013
New Zealand Road Race, Hayden Roulston
Switzerland Time Trial, Fabian Cancellara
Luxembourg Time Trial, Bob Jungels
Luxembourg Road Race, Bob Jungels
Belgium Road Race, Stijn Devolder
Croatia Road Race, Robert Kišerlovski
2014
New Zealand Road Race, Hayden Roulston
Belgian Time Trial, Kristof Vandewalle
Switzerland Time Trial, Fabian Cancellara
Luxembourg Time Trial, Laurent Didier
Japan Time Trial, Fumiyuki Beppu
Austria Road Race, Riccardo Zoidl
Luxembourg Road Race, Fränk Schleck
2015
United States Road Race, Matthew Busche
Luxembourg Time Trial, Bob Jungels
Luxembourg Road Race, Bob Jungels
2016
Australia Road Race, Jack Bobridge
Switzerland Time Trial, Fabian Cancellara
Italy Road Race, Giacomo Nizzolo
2017
Colombia Time Trial, Jarlinson Pantano
Portugal Road Race, Ruben Guerreiro
Denmark Road Race, Mads Pedersen
2018
Ethiopia Time Trial, Tsgabu Grmay
Ireland Time Trial, Ryan Mullen
Latvia Time Trial, Toms Skujiņš
2019
Ireland Time Trial, Ryan Mullen
Latvia Road Race, Toms Skujiņš
World Road Race, Mads Pedersen
2020
Luxembourg U23 Time Trial, Michel Ries
2021
Latvia Time Trial, Toms Skujiņš
Latvia Road Race, Toms Skujiņš
Ireland Time Trial, Ryan Mullen
Ireland Road Race, Ryan Mullen
2022
Latvia Time Trial, Toms Skujiņš
Latvia Road Race, Emīls Liepiņš
Netherlands Time Trial, Bauke Mollema
2023
Eritrea Time Trial, Amanuel Ghebreigzabhier
Latvia Time Trial, Toms Skujiņš
Luxembourg Time Trial, Alex Kirsch
Latvia Road Race, Emīls Liepiņš
Czech Road Race, Mathias Vacek
Denmark Road Race, Mattias Skjelmose
Luxembourg Road Race, Alex Kirsch
United States Road Race, Quinn Simmons
Europe Gravel, Jasper Stuyven
Belgium Gravel, Jasper Stuyven
2024
South Africa Time Trial, Ryan Gibbons
South Africa Road Race, Ryan Gibbons
Eritrea Time Trial, Amanuel Ghebreigzabhier
Eritrea Road Race, Natnael Tesfatsion
Netherlands Time Trial, Daan Hoole
Czech Time Trial, Mathias Vacek
Danish Time Trial, Mattias Skjelmose
2025
United States Road Race, Quinn Simmons
