= Javier Cherro =

Spanish cyclist

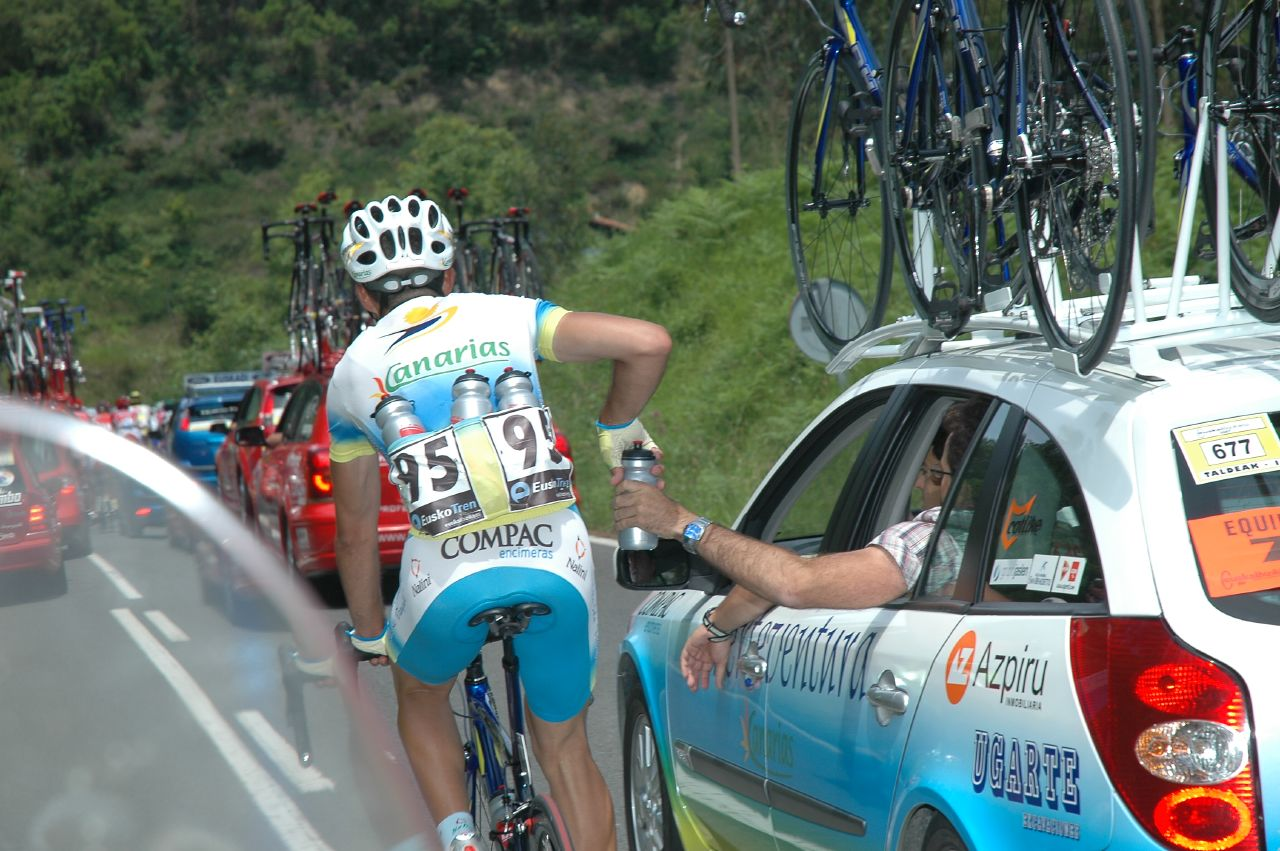

Personal information
- Full name: Javier Cherro Molina
- Born: 10 December 1980 (age 45) Alicante, Spain

Cycling career
- Sport: Cycling
- Current team: Retired
- Discipline: Road
- Role: Rider

Professional teams
- 2004–2006: Comunidad Valenciana
- 2007: Fuerteventura–Canarias

Javier Cherro Molina (10 December 1980 in Alicante) is a Spanish former racing cyclist.

== Palmares ==
2005
3rd Overall Tour of Britain
5th Overall Vuelta a la Comunidad Valenciana
