= Jesús Del Nero =

Spanish cyclist

Jesús del Nero
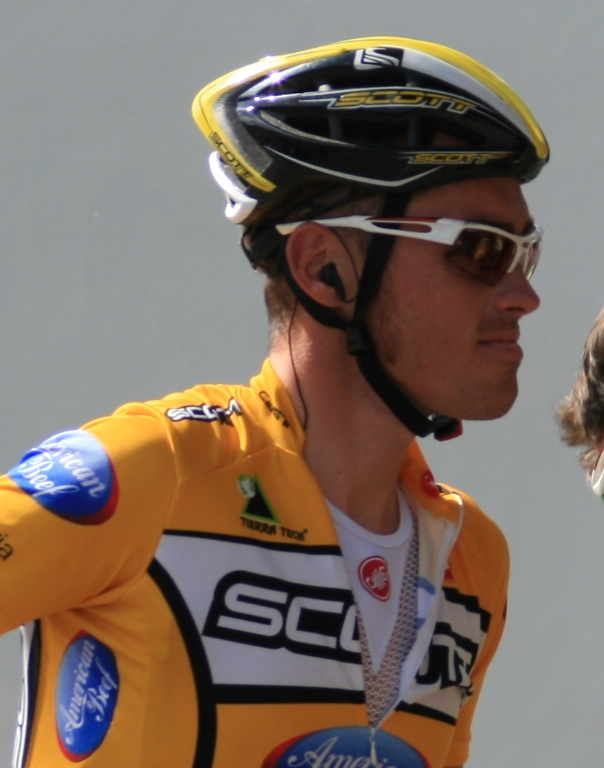

Personal information
- Full name: Jesús del Nero Montes
- Born: 16 March 1982 (age 44) Chinchón, Spain
- Height: 1.77 m (5 ft 10 in)
- Weight: 73 kg (161 lb)

Cycling career
- Sport: Cycling
- Discipline: Road
- Role: Rider

Professional teams
- 2005: Orbea
- 2006: 3 Molinos Resort
- 2007-2010: Footon–Servetto–Fuji
- 2011: Team NetApp

Jesús del Nero Montes (born 16 March 1982 in Chinchón, Madrid) is a Spanish professional road bicycle racer who most recently rode for the UCI Professional Continental Team NetApp. Del Nero turned professional with the Basque continental team Orbea in 2005 before moving to new UCI Professional Continental team 3 Molinos Resort in 2006. When 3 Molinos folded at the end of 2006, Del Nero moved to Saunier Duval, which subsequently became Fuji-Servetto. Del Nero's best results to date are third in the 2005 Euskal Bizikleta and eleventh in the 2007 Tour of Flanders.
