= Aitor Silloniz =

Spanish former road cyclist (born 1977)

Personal information
- Full name: Aitor Silloniz Aresti
- Born: 17 February 1977 (age 49) Berna, Amorebieta-Etxano, Spain

Cycling career
- Sport: Cycling
- Current team: Retired
- Discipline: Road
- Role: Rider

Amateur teams
- 1996–1997: Iberdrola–Loinaz TE
- 1998: Pinturas Banaka

Professional team
- 1999–2005: Euskaltel–Euskadi

Aitor Silloniz (born 17 February 1977) is a Spanish former road cyclist, who competed as a professional for Euskaltel–Euskadi from 1999 to 2005. His brother Josu was also a professional cyclist. He competed in the 2004 Vuelta a España.

== Major results ==
1998
1st Stage 4 Circuito Montañes
2nd Overall Ronde de l'Isard
1999
1st Stage 1 Gran Premio Internacional Mitsubishi MR Cortez
2001
1st Stage 3 Setmana Catalana de Ciclisme
2002
4th Overall Tour de l'Avenir

1st Stage 7
