= Iker Flores =

Spanish cyclist

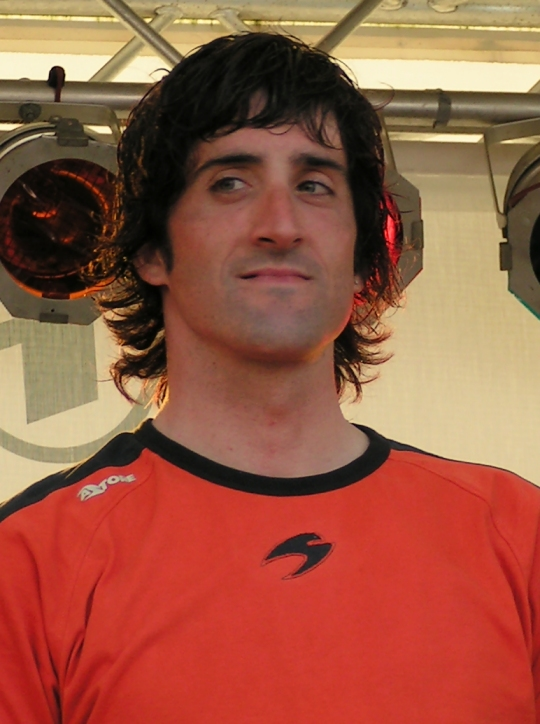
- Flores in 2006

Personal information
- Full name: Iker Flores Galarza
- Born: 28 July 1976 (age 50) Galdakao, Spain
- Height: 1.86 m (6 ft 1 in)
- Weight: 74 kg (163 lb)

Cycling career
- Sport: Cycling
- Current team: Retired
- Discipline: Road
- Role: Rider

Professional teams
- 1999–2006: Euskaltel–Euskadi
- 2007: Fuerteventura–Canarias

Major wins
- Tour de l'Avenir (2000)

Iker Flores Galarza (born 28 July 1976 in Galdakao, Basque Country) is a Spanish former professional road bicycle racer, who rode professionally between 1999 and 2007 for the Euskaltel–Euskadi and Fuerteventura–Canarias teams. He took the overall victory at the Tour de l'Avenir, along with one stage, in 2000. However, Flores did not add any professional victories, and finished the 2005 Tour de France as Lanterne Rouge, as did his brother Igor Flores in 2002. Flores was known for his attacking style of riding.

== Major results ==
2000
1st Overall Tour de l'Avenir

1st Stage 9

2001
1st Mountains classification Circuit de la Sarthe
2007
1st Sprints classification Tour of the Basque Country
