= Iker Leonet =

Spanish cyclist (born 1983)

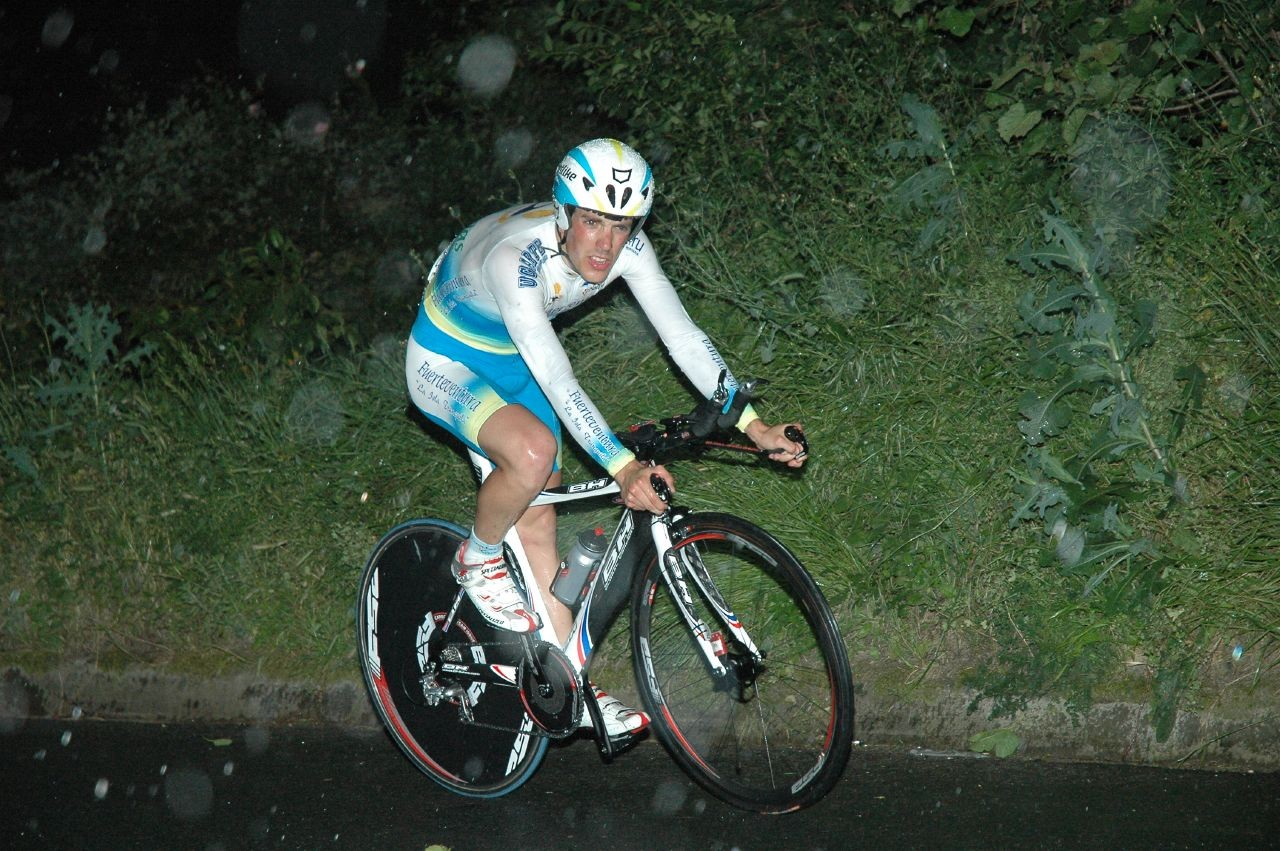

Personal information
- Full name: Iker Leonet Iza
- Born: December 10, 1983 (age 42) Oiartzun, Spain

Cycling career
- Sport: Cycling
- Current team: Retired
- Discipline: Road
- Role: Rider

Professional teams
- 2005–2006: Illes Balears–Banesto
- 2007: Fuerteventura–Canarias

Iker Leonet Iza (born December 10, 1983) is a retired Spanish cyclist who last rode for Fuerteventura–Canarias. When he joined Illes Balears–Banesto in 2005 he was the youngest rider in the team.

== Major results ==
2004
1st Stage 3 Vuelta a Cantabria
