= 3 Molinos Resort =

Team information
- UCI code: MOL
- Registered: Spain
- Founded: 2006
- Disbanded: 2006
- Discipline: Road
- Status: UCI ProTeam
- Bicycles: Felt

Key personnel
- General manager: Josefina Alcaráz

Team name history
- 2006: 3 Molinos Resort

3 Molinos Resort (UCI team code: MOL) was a short-lived professional continental cycling team based in Spain and participated in the UCI Europe Tour. When selected the team got a wildcard to UCI ProTour events. '3 Molinos' was founded in 2006 as a professional continental team, but this proved to be their last as funding was withdrawn due to doping scandals. The team was managed by José Francisco Perez, with José Luis Fernandez assisting.

== History ==
The team was created in 2005 to rcae in the 2006 UCI ProTour. They hoped to get an invite to the 2006 Vuelta a España On 2 August 2006, 12 of the riders were sacked from the team for 'poor performance'. In an effort to keep the team alive after losing the main sponsor the manager started dropping riders from the roster. The team tried to continue the 2006 season with a limited budget announcing team's for the Volta a Portugal, Vuelta a Burgos, Subida a Urkiola and the Tour of Britain. They only raced the Vuelta a Burgos. Ultimately the team folded when no other sponsor could be found.

While the team folded, 3 Molinos was in Negotiations with Caisse d'Epargne–Illes Balears to fund their team in 2007.

=== Doping ===
In 2006 the team had four incidents of doping. Firstly Santos González had his win in the Vuelta a Murcia stripped as he tested positive for Triamcinolone acetonide. Three of the Team's riders; Alberto Benito, Rafael Casero and Toni Tauler all failed blood tests prior to the start of the Volta a la Comunitat Valenciana.

== 2006 squad ==
As of 31 December 2006.

Rider	Date of birth
Mikel Artetxe (Note: Artetxe joined the team on 1 April) (ESP)	24 September 1976 (aged 30)
José Antonio Baños (ESP)	18 March 1986 (aged 20)
Alberto Benito (ESP)	3 March 1975 (aged 31)
Mario José Box (ESP)	28 August 1978 (aged 28)
Jesús Buendía (ESP)	28 December 1982 (aged 24)
José Javier Cano (ESP)	6 September 1985 (aged 21)
Rafael Casero (ESP)	9 October 1976 (aged 30)
Pedro Luis Castillo (ESP)	15 February 1982 (aged 24)
Isidro Cerrato Lopez (ESP)	6 March 1981 (aged 25)
Jesús del Nero (ESP)	16 March 1982 (aged 24)
Sergio Domínguez Rodríguez (ESP)	2 August 1979 (aged 27)

Rider	Date of birth
Jorge Ferrío (ESP)	24 August 1976 (aged 30)
Julio García (ESP)	29 July 1973 (aged 33)
Santos González (ESP)	17 December 1973 (aged 33)
Jan Hruška (CZE)	4 February 1975 (aged 31)
Rubén Lorca (ESP)	20 April 1984 (aged 22)
Pedro Martínez Romera (ESP)	13 February 1981 (aged 25)
Francisco Tomás Pellicer (ESP)	19 July 1981 (aged 25)
Jordi Riera Valls (ESP)	9 April 1978 (aged 28)
Alexis Rodríguez Hernández (ESP)	27 April 1977 (aged 29)
Toni Tauler (ESP)	11 April 1974 (aged 32)
Eloy Teruel (ESP)	20 November 1982 (aged 24)

== Major wins ==
2006
Overall Vuelta a Murcia, Santos González
Overall Clásica Internacional de Alcobendas, Jan Hruška

Stage 3, Jan Hruška

Stage 4 Volta ao Alentejo em Bicicleta, Alberto Benito
Stage 4 Vuelta Asturias, Mikel Artetxe
Spain National Time trial championship, Toni Tauler
