= Iñaki Aiarzagüena =

Spanish cyclist (born 1969)

Personal information
- Full name: Iñaki Aiarzagüena Urkidi
- Born: 30 July 1969 (age 57) Zaldibar, Spain

Cycling career
- Sport: Cycling
- Current team: Retired
- Discipline: Road
- Role: Rider

Professional teams
- 1992–1994: ONCE
- 1995: Santa Clara–Cadena Master
- 1996–1998: Equipo Euskadi

Iñaki Aiarzagüena (born 30 July 1969) is a Spanish former road cyclist, who competed as a professional from 1992 to 1998. He competed in four editions of the Vuelta a España.

== Major results ==
1991
1st Memorial Valenciaga
1996
1st Memorial Manuel Galera
1st Txitxarro Igoera
4th Overall Vuelta a La Rioja

1st Stage 1b (TTT)

10th Subida al Naranco
1998
4th Subida al Naranco
9th Overall Volta a Portugal
