= Urdiain =

Municipality of Spain

Coordinates: 42°53′N 2°08′W

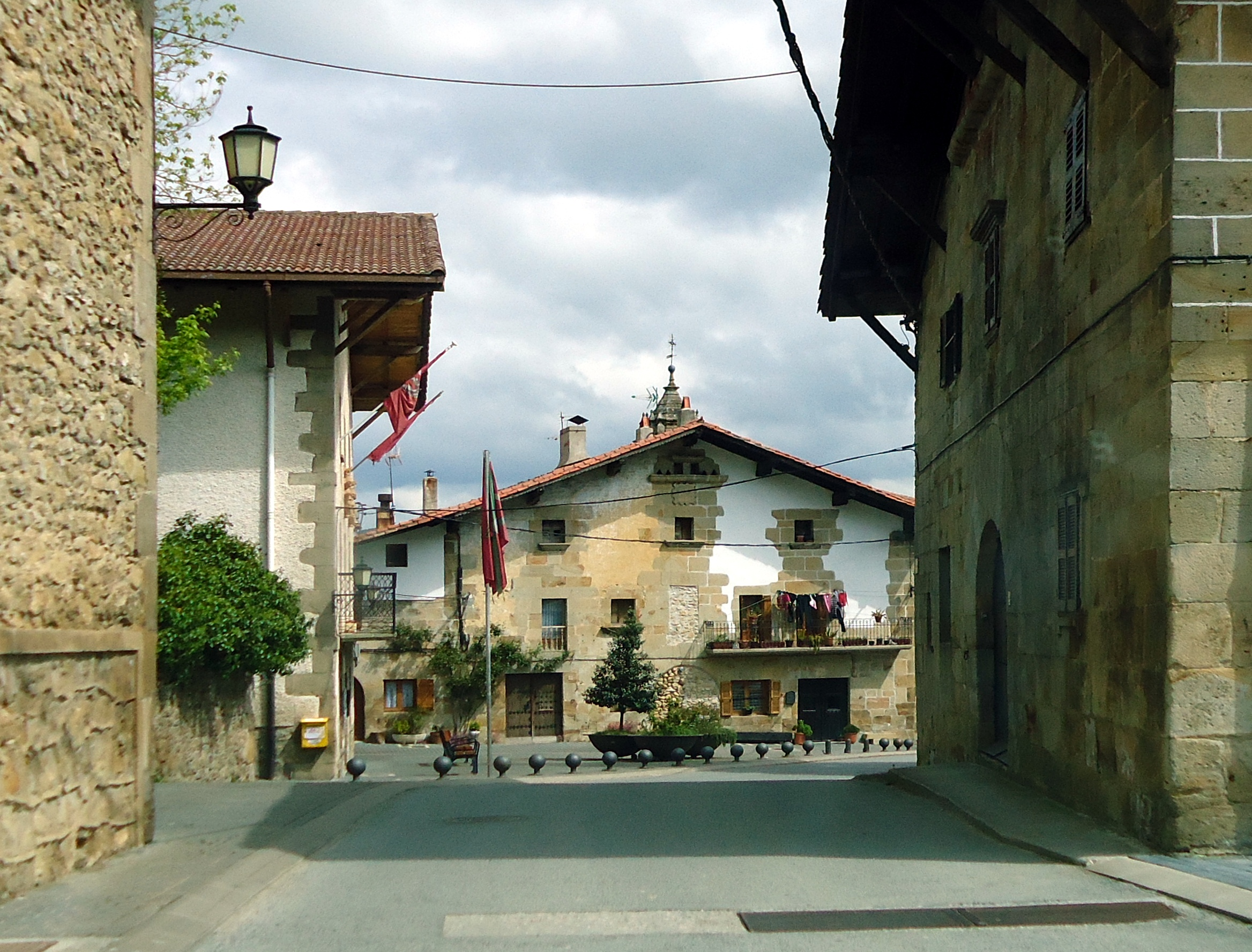
Town hall of Urdiain by the side

Urdiain is a town and municipality located in the province of Navarre, in the autonomous community of Navarre, in the North of Spain.

The town of Urdiain has a population of under 700.
