= Euskaltel–Euskadi (1994–2013) =

Spanish cycling team

Euskaltel-Euskadi

Team information
- UCI code: EUS
- Registered: Spain
- Founded: 1994
- Disbanded: 2013
- Discipline: Road
- Status: UCI ProTeam
- Bicycles: Orbea
- Website: Team home page

Key personnel
- Team managers: 2009: Josu Larrazabal; 2014: Miguel Madariaga

Team name history
- 1994 1995–1997 1998–2013: Euskadi-Petronor; Equipo Euskadi; Euskaltel-Euskadi
Euskaltel–Euskadi jersey
Jersey

Euskaltel–Euskadi (UCI team code: EUS) was a professional road bicycle racing team from Spain, Europe. The team was commercially sponsored, but was also partly funded by the Basque Government until the end of 2013, with riders either from the Basque Country, Navarre, La Rioja, and the French Basque Country, or who had grown up in the cycling culture of those regions: This policy was abandoned to enable retention of World Tour status. Its sponsor was Euskaltel, a Basque telecom company. Euskaltel–Euskadi was famous for its all-orange team kits. Whenever the Tour de France passed through the Basque Country many spectators lined the route dressed in the team's orange or the colours of the Basque flag. The Euskaltel team also has a second team inside the "Fundacion Euskadi", this team rode in a continental category, the name of the team was Orbea. This team was created with the aim of forming the young cyclist before going to the Euskaltel–Euskadi.

== History ==
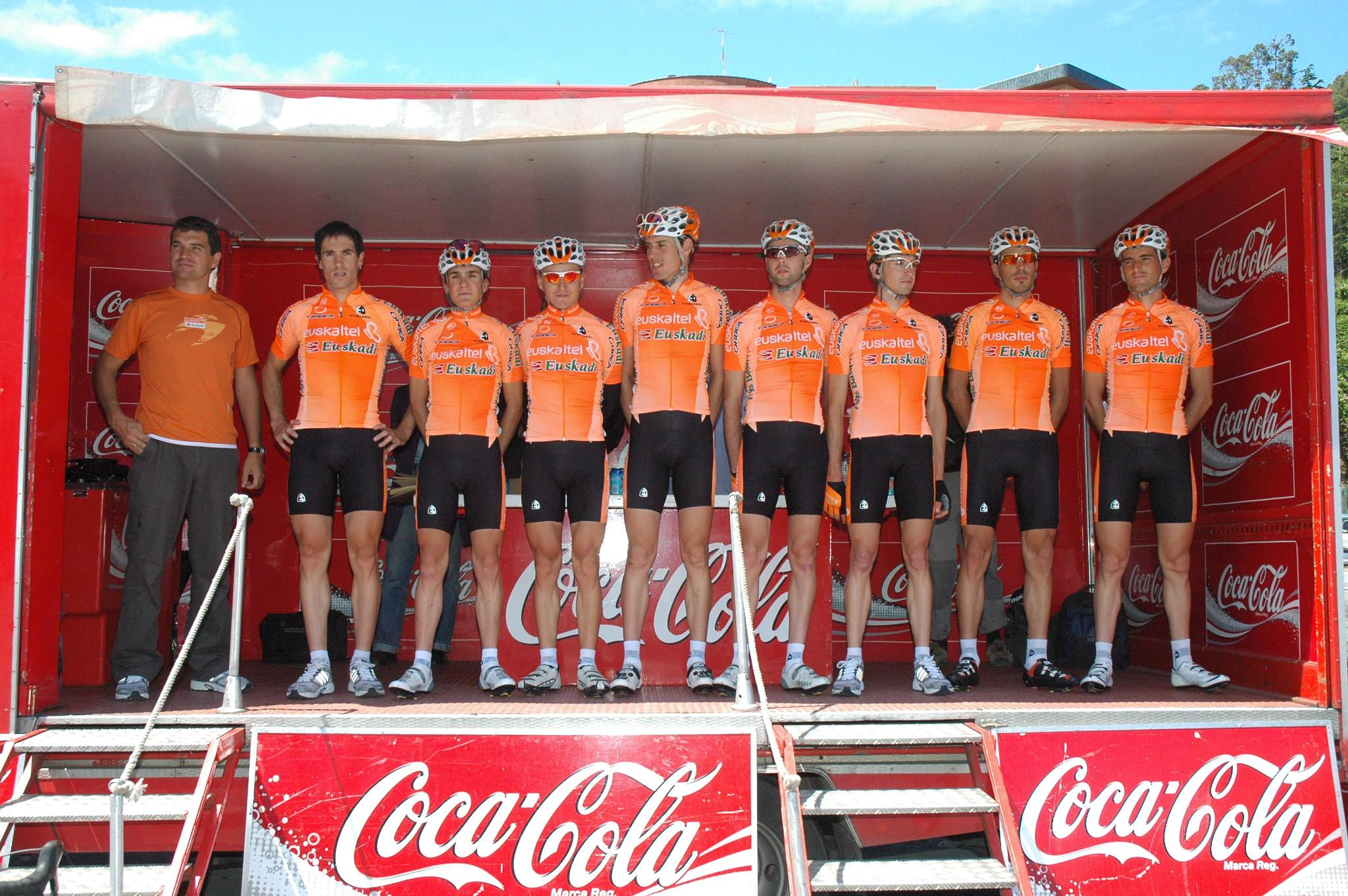
Euskaltel-Euskadi team in 2008

Following the creation of the Euskadi Cycling Foundation (June 1993), Euskadi was established in 1994 (as Euskadi-Petronor), and has been recognizable among the peloton for their bright orange kit (which developed later in the team's history). After a financially turbulent first few seasons, in which the team was on the brink of folding multiple times, they secured their long term and most successful sponsor Euskaltel. By 1999, with Roberto Laiseka winning the team's first Grand Tour stage win this investment had paid off. In 2001 they were invited to the Tour de France and achieved another victory for Laiseka in the Pyrénées.

After a 2003 Tour de France breakthrough success during which both Iban Mayo and Haimar Zubeldia finished in the top-10 of the general classification, with Mayo winning the prized Alpe d'Huez stage. Euskaltel–Euskadi was considered to be a strong contender for the 2004 Tour de France as well. Iban Mayo's commanding victory in the 2004 Critérium du Dauphiné Libéré stage race (traditionally seen as one of the tests for Tour de France contenders), including defeating Lance Armstrong in the Mont Ventoux hill climb individual time trial stage, further fueled the hype. Unfortunately, Mayo was injured in a crash on a pavé section of an early stage of the Tour de France, and abandoned in the first Pyrénées stage. Zubeldia also failed to deliver in the 2004 Tour de France, to the chagrin of Basque fans lining the road. "I wish that our uniform was not so easy to spot," admitted directeur sportif Julián Gorospe.

In the 2005 season the team recruited Aitor González, who won the Tour de Suisse. They again failed to make an impression in the 2005 Tour de France. In 2006 the sporting director Julián Gorospe was replaced by Igor González de Galdeano, who became technical secretary. Euskaltel–Euskadi ranked 13th in the UCI World Tour rankings among 18 teams, but only the top 15 teams automatically qualify for the World Tour for the following year ^{(source?)}. The other teams qualify based on a variety of criteria, including team points and a dedication to clean racing, but the most important are points earned by individual riders.

Under points pressure, Euskaltel confirmed in 2012 that it would break with its long-standing policy of signing a majority of Basque riders and would employ riders of other countries to assure its UCI World Tour standing. This has had knock on effects for the makeup of other traditionally Basque teams such as Orbea and Caja Rural. For example, in the 2013 season Euskaltel's Amets Txurruka and Iván Velasco moved to Caja Rural.

The withdrawal of sponsorship via government funds prompted the team to announce it would be unable to continue after the 2013 season. In September 2013 Formula One racing driver Fernando Alonso expressed a wish to ensure the team's survival by buying their UCI World Tour license but reached no agreement with the team.

In 2018 Mikel Landa, the President of the Euskadi Cycling Foundation, established Team Fundación Euskadi on the Continental tour. In 2020, Euskaltel revived its sponsorship, thereby rebranding the team with the name of its predecessor, Euskaltel-Euskadi.

== Final team roster ==
As of 9 September 2013.

Rider	Date of birth
Jon Aberasturi (ESP)	28 March 1989 (aged 23)
Igor Antón (ESP)	2 March 1983 (aged 29)
Mikel Astarloza (ESP)	17 November 1979 (aged 33)
Jorge Azanza (ESP)	16 June 1982 (aged 30)
Pello Bilbao (ESP)	27 February 1990 (aged 22)
Garikoitz Bravo (ESP)	31 July 1989 (aged 23)
Tarik Chaoufi (Note: Chaoufi left the team on 13 August.) (MAR)	26 February 1986 (aged 26)
Ricardo García (ESP)	26 February 1988 (aged 24)
Gorka Izagirre (ESP)	7 October 1987 (aged 25)
Ion Izagirre (ESP)	4 February 1989 (aged 23)
Jure Kocjan (SLO)	18 October 1984 (aged 28)
Mikel Landa (ESP)	13 December 1989 (aged 23)
Juan José Lobato (ESP)	29 December 1988 (aged 24)
Egoi Martínez (ESP)	15 May 1978 (aged 34)
Ricardo Mestre (POR)	11 September 1983 (aged 29)

Rider	Date of birth
Miguel Mínguez (ESP)	30 August 1988 (aged 24)
Mikel Nieve (ESP)	26 May 1984 (aged 28)
Juan José Oroz (ESP)	7 November 1980 (aged 32)
Rubén Pérez (ESP)	30 October 1981 (aged 31)
Steffen Radochla (GER)	19 October 1978 (aged 34)
Adrián Sáez (ESP)	17 March 1986 (aged 26)
Samuel Sánchez (ESP)	5 February 1978 (aged 34)
André Schulze (GER)	21 November 1974 (aged 38)
Alexander Serebryakov (Note: Serebryakov was suspended from the team on 6 April, adverse analytical finding in an out-of-competition drugs test in March. He was later sacked.) (RUS)	25 September 1987 (aged 25)
Romain Sicard (FRA)	1 January 1988 (aged 25)
Ioannis Tamouridis (GRE)	3 June 1980 (aged 32)
Pablo Urtasun (ESP)	29 March 1980 (aged 32)
Gorka Verdugo (ESP)	4 November 1978 (aged 34)
Robert Vrečer (SLO)	8 October 1980 (aged 32)

== Major wins ==
1995
Stages 4 & 8 Volta ao Algarve, Asier Guenetxea

1996
Memorial Manuel Galera, Iñaki Ayarzagüena
Txitxarro Igoera, Iñaki Ayarzagüena
Stage 4 Vuelta a Asturias, Álvaro González de Galdeano
Spain Time Trial Championship, Iñigo González de Heredia

1997
Stage 4 Vuelta a los Valles Mineros, Igor González de Galdeano

1998
Stage 8 Tour de l'Avenir, Txema Del Olmo Zendegi
Stages 7 & 12 Volta a Portugal, Unai Etxebarria
Clásica de Sabiñánigo, Igor González de Galdeano
Stage 5 Volta a Galicia, Igor González de Galdeano

1999
Stage 1 GP Mitsubishi, Aitor Silloniz
Stage 4 GP Jornal de Noticias, José Alberto Martínez
Stage 1 GP du Midi-Libre, José Alberto Martínez
Stage 18 Vuelta a España, Roberto Laiseka

2000
Overall, GP Jornal de Noticias, Mikel Artetxe Guezuraga

Stages 1 & 4 GP Jornal de Noticias, Mikel Artetxe Guezuraga

Klasika Primavera, Unai Etxebarria
Overall Tour de l'Avenir, Iker Flores

Stage 8, Aitor Kintana
Stage 9, Iker Flores

Prologue Critérium du Dauphiné Libéré, Alberto Lopez de Munain Ruiz de Gauna
Stage 1 Vuelta a Asturias, Alberto Lopez de Munain Ruiz de Gauna
Stage 1 Vuelta a Burgos, José Alberto Martínez
Overall Euskal Bizikleta, Haimar Zubeldia

Stage 4b, Haimar Zubeldia

2001
Stage 5 Vuelta a Andalucía, Mikel Artetxe
Stage 3 Volta a la Comunitat Valenciana, David Etxebarria
Stage 3 Setmana Catalana de Ciclisme, Aitor Silloniz
Stage 4 Tour of the Basque Country, Angel Castresana
Stage 4 Vuelta a La Rioja, Igor Flores
Stage 5 Vuelta a Asturias, Alberto López de Munain
Overall GP du Midi-Libre, Iban Mayo
Classique des Alpes, Iban Mayo
Stage 3 Critérium du Dauphiné Libéré, Unai Etxebarria
Stage 6 Critérium du Dauphiné Libéré, Iban Mayo
Stage 14 Tour de France, Roberto Laiseka

2002
Trofeo Manacor, Igor Flores
Overall Critérium International, José Alberto Martínez
Stages 5a & 5b Tour of the Basque Country, David Etxebarria
Stage 1 Vuelta a Castilla y León, David Herrero
Stage 4a Euskal Bizikleta, David Etxebarria
Stage 5 Troféu Joaquim Agostinho, Mikel Artetxe
Stage 7 Tour de l'Avenir, Aitor Silloniz

2003
Overall Tour of the Basque Country, Iban Mayo

Stages 1, 5a & 5b Iban Mayo

Stage 1 Vuelta a La Rioja, David Herrero
Stage 1 Euskal Bizikleta, David Etxebarria
Prologue & Stage 4 Critérium du Dauphiné Libéré, Iban Mayo
Stage 1 Troféu Joaquim Agostinho, Lander Euba
Stage 8 Tour de France, Iban Mayo
Stage 5 Vuelta a Burgos, Gorka González
Overall Tour de l'Avenir, Egoi Martínez

2004
Trofeo Calvià, Unai Etxebarria
Overall Clásica de Alcobendas, Iban Mayo

Stages 1 & 2, Iban Mayo

Subida al Naranco, Iban Mayo
GP Llodio, Unai Etxebarria
Overall Vuelta a Asturias, Iban Mayo
Stage 5 Euskal Bizikleta, Roberto Laiseka
Overall Critérium du Dauphiné Libéré, Iban Mayo

Prologue & Stage 4, Iban Mayo

2005
Stage 2 Clásica de Alcobendas, David Herrero
GP Llodio, David Herrero
Stage 4b Euskal Bizikleta, David Herrero
Overall Critérium du Dauphiné Libéré, Iñigo Landaluze
Overall Tour de Suisse, Aitor González

Stage 9, Aitor González

Stage 5 Vuelta a Burgos, David Herrero
Stage 11 Vuelta a España, Roberto Laiseka
Stage 13 Vuelta a España, Samuel Sánchez
Escalada a Montjuïc, Samuel Sánchez

2006
Stages 2 & 3 Tour of the Basque Country, Samuel Sánchez
Stage 5 Euskal Bizikleta, David Herrero
Stage 6 Critérium du Dauphiné Libéré, Iban Mayo
Stage 3 Vuelta a Asturias, Samuel Sánchez
Overall Vuelta a Burgos, Iban Mayo

Stage 4, Iban Mayo

Subida a Urkiola, Iban Mayo
Stage 13 Vuelta a España, Samuel Sánchez
Stage 16 Vuelta a España, Igor Antón
Züri-Metzgete, Samuel Sánchez
Escalada a Montjuïc, Igor Antón

2007
Trofeo Calvià, Unai Etxebarria
Stage 7 Tirreno–Adriatico, Koldo Fernández
Stage 6 Tour of the Basque Country, Samuel Sánchez
Stage 4 Tour de Romandie, Igor Antón
Stage 7 Volta a Catalunya, Samuel Sánchez
Stages 15, 19 & 20 Vuelta a España, Samuel Sánchez

2008
Stage 5 Vuelta a Murcia, Koldo Fernández
Stage 5 Vuelta a Castilla y León, Koldo Fernández
Stage 2b Vuelta a Asturias, Samuel Sánchez
Stage 2 Euskal Bizikleta, Koldo Fernández
Stage 2 Tour de Suisse, Igor Antón
Stage 3 Vuelta a Burgos, Koldo Fernández
Tour de Vendée, Koldo Fernández

2009
Stage 2 Volta ao Algarve, Koldo Fernández
GP Llodio, Samuel Sánchez
Circuito de Getxo, Koldo Fernández
Subida a Urkiola, Igor Antón
Stage 1 Vuelta a Burgos, Koldo Fernández

2010
Stage 4 Tour of the Basque Country, Samuel Sánchez
Klasika Primavera, Samuel Sánchez
Stage 3 Vuelta a Castilla y León, Igor Antón
Stage 1 Vuelta a Asturias, Pablo Urtasun
Stage 3b Vuelta a Asturias, Beñat Intxausti
Stage 5 Tour de Romandie, Igor Antón
Stage 1 Bayern Rundfahrt, Rubén Pérez
Stage 4 Tour de Luxembourg, Gorka Izagirre
Prueba Villafranca de Ordizia, Gorka Izagirre
Overall Vuelta a Burgos, Samuel Sánchez

Stage 1, Koldo Fernández
Stages 2 & 5, Samuel Sánchez

Stages 4 & 11 Vuelta a España, Igor Antón
Stage 16 Vuelta a España, Mikel Nieve
Tour de Vendée, Koldo Fernández

2011
GP Miguel Induráin, Samuel Sánchez
Stage 4 Tour of the Basque Country, Samuel Sánchez
Prologue Tour de Romandie, Jonathan Castroviejo
Stage 1 Vuelta a la Comunidad de Madrid, Jonathan Castroviejo
Stage 14 Giro d'Italia, Igor Antón
Stage 15 Giro d'Italia, Mikel Nieve
Stage 12 Tour de France, Samuel Sánchez
Stage 1 Vuelta a Burgos, Samuel Sánchez
Stage 5 Vuelta a Burgos, Mikel Landa
Stage 19 Vuelta a España, Igor Antón

2012
Stage 6 Volta a Catalunya, Samuel Sánchez
Overall Tour of the Basque Country, Samuel Sánchez

Stages 3 & 6 (ITT), Samuel Sánchez

Stage 2b (ITT) Vuelta a Asturias, Jon Izagirre
Stage 16 Giro d'Italia, Jon Izagirre
Prueba Villafranca de Ordizia, Gorka Izagirre
Stage 7 Tour of Britain, Pablo Urtasun

2013
Stage 1 Vuelta a Castilla y León, Pablo Urtasun
Stage 2 Vuelta a Castilla y León, Juan José Lobato
Stage 7 Critérium du Dauphiné, Samuel Sánchez
Greece Time Trial Championships, Ioannis Tamouridis
Greece Road Race Championships, Ioannis Tamouridis
Circuito de Getxo, Juan José Lobato

== See also ==
- List of cycling teams in Spain
- Orbea (cycling team)
- Euskadi–Murias
- Athletic Bilbao, football club with a similar Basque player hiring policy
