= Fuerteventura–Canarias =

Team information
- UCI code: FTV
- Registered: Spain
- Founded: 2007
- Disbanded: 2008
- Discipline: Road

Key personnel
- General manager: Jorge Sastre

Fuerteventura–Canarias (UCI team code: FTV) was a UCI Professional Continental cycling team based in Spain. The team was founded in late 2006 ready to compete in the 2007 season, as a follow-up of the Comunidad Valenciana cycling team. The team was managed by Jorge Sastre with Oscar Guerrero and Rufino Murguia assisting. As of 2008 they are no longer a UCI Professional Continental team.

== 2007 team ==
Rider	Date of birth
Mikel Artetxe (ESP)	September 24, 1976 (age 49)
Vicente Ballester (ESP)	June 20, 1980 (age 46)
David Belda (ESP)	March 18, 1983 (age 43)
David Bernabeu (ESP)	January 9, 1975 (age 51)
José Adrián Bonilla (CRC)	April 28, 1978 (age 48)
Javier Cherro (ESP)	December 10, 1980 (age 45)
Oleg Chuzhda Jr. (UKR)	May 8, 1985 (age 41)
Dailos Manuel Díaz (ESP)	September 17, 1980 (age 45)
Iker Flores (ESP)	July 28, 1976 (age 50)

Rider	Date of birth
Rodrigo García Rena (ESP)	February 27, 1980 (age 46)
Iker Leonet (ESP)	December 10, 1983 (age 42)
Manuel Lloret (ESP)	August 4, 1981 (age 45)
David Muñoz (ESP)	June 9, 1979 (age 47)
Joaquin Ortega (ESP)	March 19, 1981 (age 45)
Adrián Palomares (ESP)	February 18, 1976 (age 50)
Antonio Piedra (ESP)	October 10, 1985 (age 40)
Javier Ramírez (ESP)	March 14, 1978 (age 48)
Eladio Sanchez (ESP)	July 12, 1984 (age 42)
