= Josu Larrazabal =

Spanish cyclist

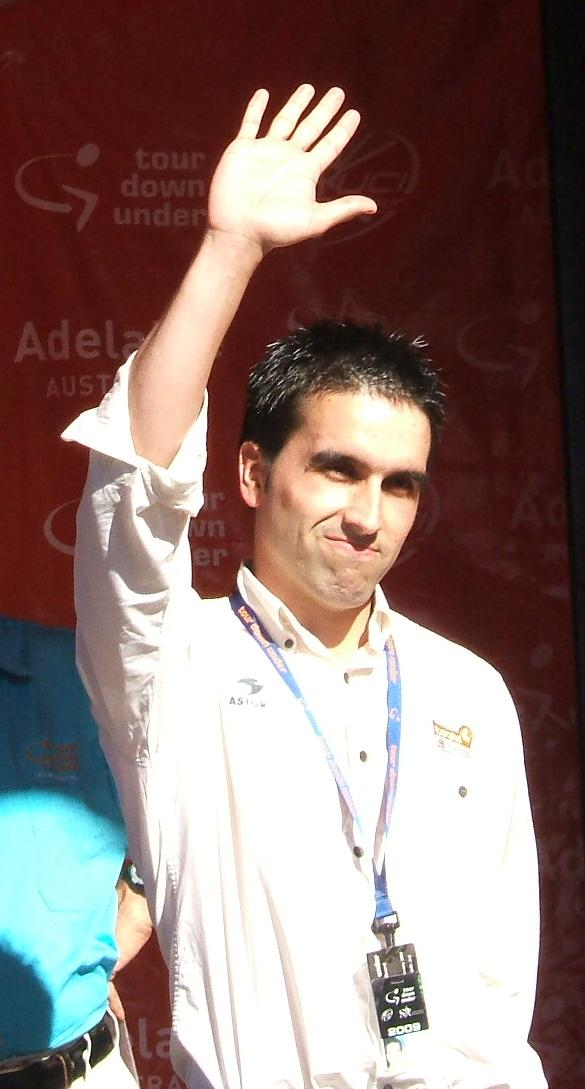

Personal information
- Full name: Josu Larrazabal
- Born: 24 December 1981 (age 44) Orozko, Spain

Cycling career
- Sport: Cycling
- Current team: Trek–Segafredo
- Discipline: Road
- Role: Head of Performance

Josu Larrazabal has the role Head of Performance in the Lidl–Trek cycling team.
