= Alexis Rodríguez (cyclist) =

Spanish cyclist

Personal information
- Full name: Alexis Rodríguez Hernández
- Born: 27 April 1977 (age 49) Miramas, France

Cycling career
- Sport: Cycling
- Current team: Retires
- Discipline: Road
- Role: Rider

Amateur team
- 2009–2010: Supermercados Froiz

Professional teams
- 2001–2003: Kelme–Costa Blanca
- 2004: Beppi–Ovarense
- 2005: Barbot–Pascoal
- 2006: 3 Molinos Resort
- 2007–2008: Fercase–Rota dos Móveis
- 2010–2011: LeTua Cycling Team

Alexis Rodríguez Hernández (born 27 April 1977) is a Spanish former road cyclist, who competed as a professional between 2001 and 2011. He competed in the 2001 and 2003 Giro d'Italia.

== Major results ==
2002
1st Stage 8 Volta a Portugal
2004
1st Overall Cinturón a Mallorca

1st Mountains classification

Troféu Joaquim Agostinho

1st Mountains classification
1st Stage 3

3rd Overall Circuito Montañes

1st Mountains classification

9th Clásica Internacional Txuma
2005
1st Mountains classification, Vuelta a Castilla y León
2007
1st Mountains classification, GP Internacional Paredes Rota dos Móveis
5th Overall Troféu Joaquim Agostinho
2008
4th Overall Troféu Joaquim Agostinho
6th Overall GP Internacional Paredes Rota dos Móveis
