= Mikel Artetxe =

Spanish cyclist (born 1976)

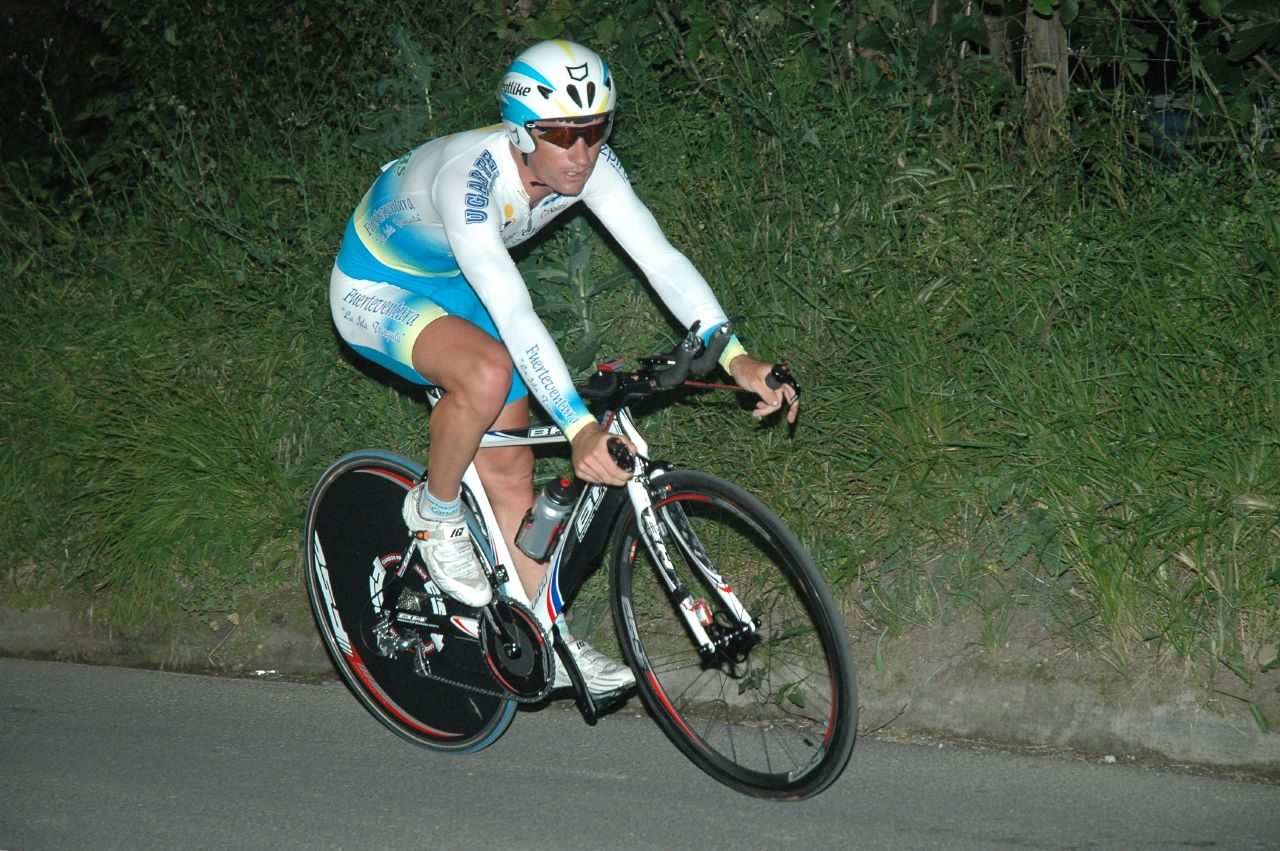

Personal information
- Full name: Mikel Artetxe Guezuraga
- Born: 24 September 1976 (age 50) Larrabetzu, Basque Country, Spain
- Height: 1.76 m (5 ft 9 in)
- Weight: 64 kg (141 lb)

Cycling career
- Sport: Cycling
- Current team: Retired
- Discipline: Road
- Role: Rider

Professional teams
- 1999–2005: Euskaltel–Euskadi
- 2006: 3 Molinos Resort
- 2007: Fuerteventura–Canarias

Mikel Artetxe Guezuraga (born 24 September 1976) is a Spanish former road bicycle racer, who rode professionally between 1999 and 2007 for the Euskaltel–Euskadi, 3 Molinos Resort and Fuerteventura–Canarias teams.

== Career ==
He turned professional in 1999 with Euskaltel–Euskadi, where he stayed for seven seasons. In his time with Euskaltel–Euskadi, Artetxe took two stages and the overall victory in the GP Jornal de Noticias in 2000, a stage victory in the 2001 Vuelta a Andalucía and a stage victory in the 2002 Troféu Joaquim Agostinho.

At the start of the 2006 season, Artetxe moved a division down to the newly formed 3 Molinos Resort team. Here he had the biggest wins of his career, with a stage win in the Vuelta a Asturias and the sprints classification in the Troféu Joaquim Agostinho. With the rapid demise of 3 Molinos Resort, Artetxe moved to the newly formed Fuerteventura–Canarias team for 2007.
