= Ricardo Serrano (cyclist) =

Spanish cyclist

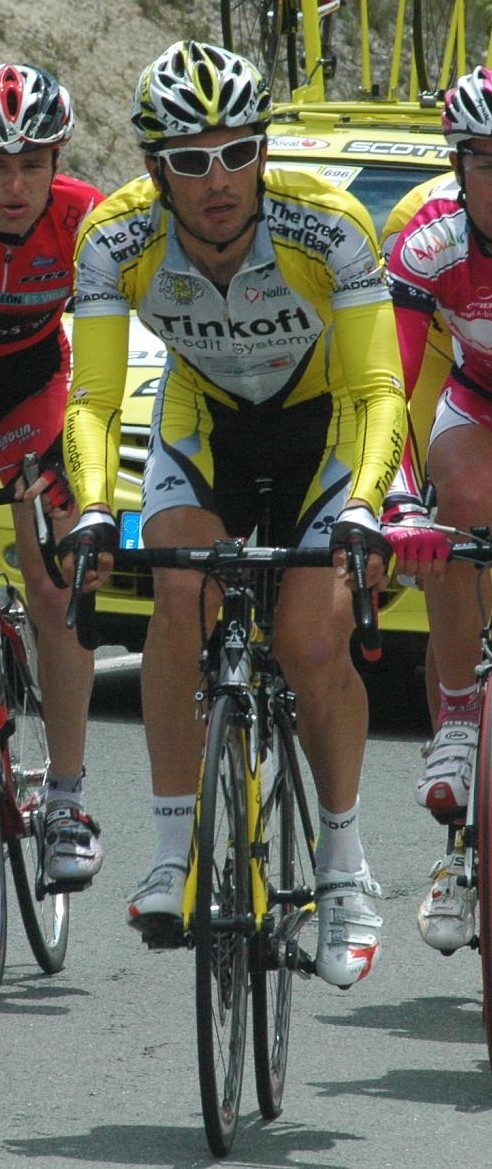

Personal information
- Full name: Ricardo Serrano Gonzalez
- Born: 4 August 1978 (age 48) Valladolid, Spain
- Height: 1.81 m (5 ft 11 in)
- Weight: 67 kg (148 lb)

Cycling career
- Sport: Cycling
- Discipline: Road
- Role: Rider

Professional team
- 2003–2004: Labarca–2 Cafés Baqué
- 2005–2006: Kaiku
- 2007–2008: Tinkoff Credit Systems
- 2009: Fuji–Servetto

Ricardo Serrano Gonzalez (born 4 August 1978 in Valladolid) is a Spanish retired racing cyclist.

== Doping sanction ==
Serrano received a two-year sanction after being caught under the UCI's biological passport programme. Evidence against Serrano was based on an abnormal haematological profile and two laboratory reports indicating the detection of CERA in two of his blood samples. The first anomalies in his passport were from the 2008 season, when Serrano rode for Tinkoff Credit Systems, while the two CERA positives were from 2009, when he rode for Fuji-Servetto.

== Professional record ==
- 1st, Stage 1, 2009 Tour de Romandie
- 2007 Giro d'Italia - 102nd
  - 3rd, Stage 16
- Vuelta a La Rioja - 1 stage, GC & Points Classification (2006)
- GP CTT Correios de Portugal - Mountains Classification (2003)
