= Vicente Ballester =

Spanish cyclist

Personal information
- Full name: Vicente Ballester Martínez
- Born: 20 June 1980 (age 46) Castellón de la Plana, Spain
- Height: 176 cm (5 ft 9 in)
- Weight: 62 kg (137 lb)

Cycling career
- Sport: Cycling
- Current team: Retired
- Discipline: Road
- Role: Rider

Professional teams
- 2004–2006: Comunidad Valenciana
- 2007: Fuerteventura–Canarias

Vicente Ballester Martínez (born 20 June 1980 in Castellón de la Plana) is a former Spanish racing cyclist.

== Palmarès ==
2007
3rd Clásica de Almería
